= Blur discography =

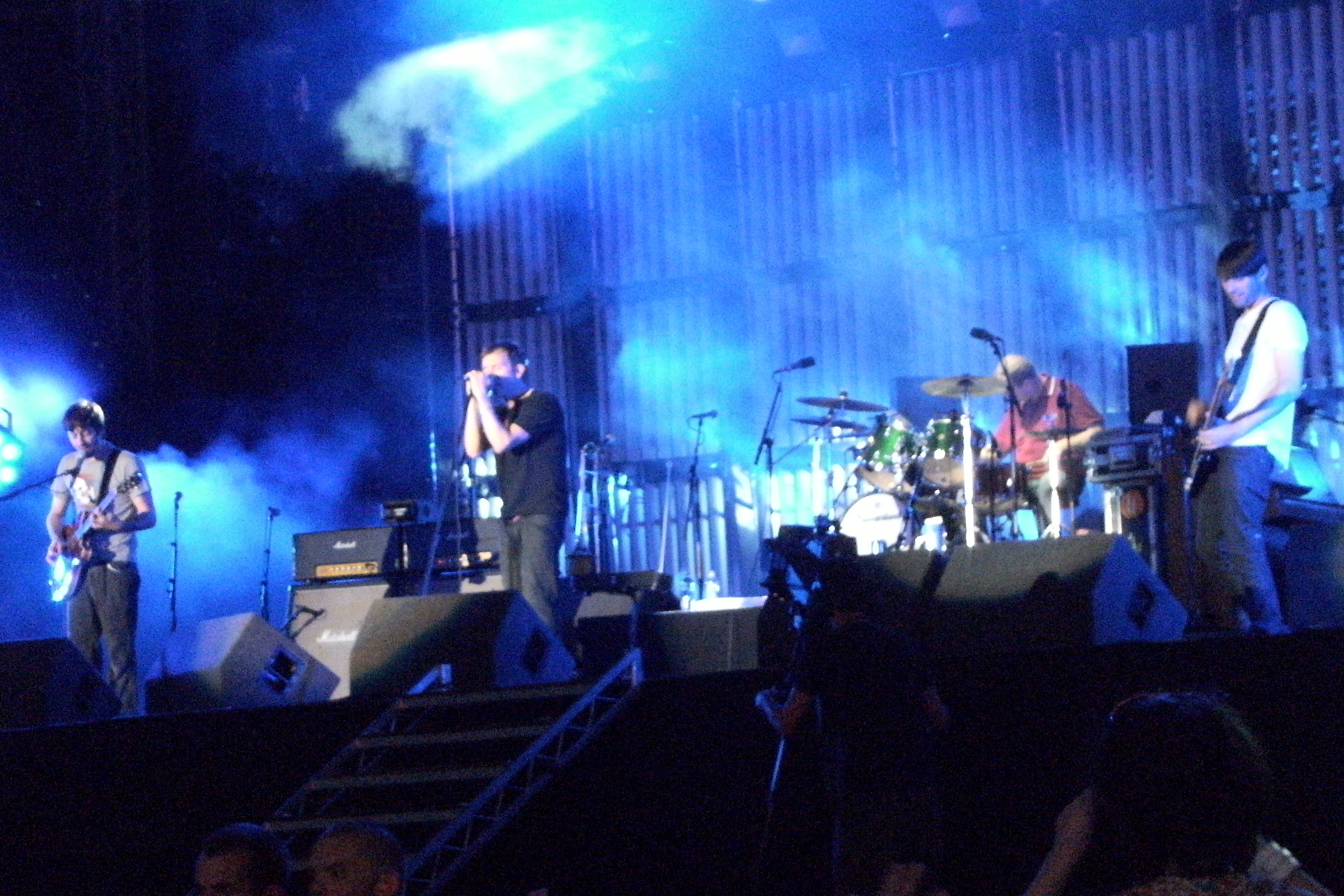
- Blur performing at Hyde Park in July 2009
- Studio albums: 9
- Extended plays: 4
- Live albums: 6
- Compilation albums: 5
- Singles: 35
- Video albums: 2
- Music videos: 37
- Remix albums: 1
- Promotional singles: 10
- Box sets: 2

The British rock band Blur have released nine studio albums, six live albums, five compilation albums, one remix album, two video albums, four extended plays, 35 singles, 10 promotional singles and 37 music videos. Formed in London in 1988, the group consists of singer/keyboardist Damon Albarn, guitarist/singer Graham Coxon, bassist Alex James and drummer Dave Rowntree. Three years later, their debut release, the Madchester and shoegazing-tinged Leisure (1991), peaked at number seven on the UK Albums Chart. Modern Life Is Rubbish (1993) inaugurated the Britpop phase of their career. Its multi-Platinum follow-ups Parklife (1994) and The Great Escape (1995) helped the band achieve mainstream popularity in Britain; every Blur studio album from Parklife onwards has topped the British charts.

== Albums ==
=== Studio albums ===
List of studio albums, with selected chart positions and certifications
Title	Album details	Peak chart positions										Sales	Certifications
Title	Album details	UK	AUS	CAN	FRA	GER	JPN	NOR	NZ	SWE	US	Sales	Certifications
Leisure	Released: 26 August 1991 (UK); Label: Food; Formats: CD, cassette, LP	7	142	—	—	—	—	—	—	—	— (Note: Leisure did not enter the US Billboard 200, but peaked at number 20 on the US Heatseekers Albums Chart.)		BPI: Gold
Modern Life Is Rubbish	Released: 10 May 1993 (UK); Label: Food; Formats: CD, cassette, LP	15	143	—	—	—	—	—	—	—	—		BPI: Gold
Parklife	Released: 25 April 1994 (UK); Label: Food; Formats: CD, cassette, LP	1	45	41	—	—	36	37	27	8	— (Note: Parklife did not enter the US Billboard 200, but peaked at number six on the US Heatseekers Albums Chart.)	UK: 1,000,000+ (Note: Sales as of May 2014)	BPI: 4× Platinum; MC: Gold
The Great Escape	Released: 11 September 1995 (UK); Label: Food; Formats: CD, cassette, LP	1	10	24	14	35	5	5	7	2	150	UK: 901,349 (Note: Sales as of July 2023)	BPI: 3× Platinum; IFPI NOR: Gold; IFPI SWE: Gold; MC: Gold; RIAJ: Gold; SNEP: Gold
Blur	Released: 10 February 1997 (UK); Label: Food; Formats: CD, cassette, LP, MD	1	22	26	12	23	7	6	3	4	61	US: 679,000 (Note: Sales as of April 2005)	BPI: Platinum; ARIA: Gold; MC: Platinum; RIAA: Gold; RIAJ: Platinum; RMNZ: Platinum
13	Released: 15 March 1999 (UK); Label: Food; Formats: CD, cassette, LP, MD	1	12	11	12	6	13	1	2	4	80	US: 136,000 (Note: Sales as of September 2002)	BPI: Platinum; MC: Gold; RIAJ: Gold; RMNZ: Platinum
Think Tank	Released: 5 May 2003 (UK); Label: Parlophone; Formats: CD, cassette, LP	1	30	31	11	8	14	18	27	44	56	US: 94,000 (Note: Sales as of April 2015)	BPI: Gold
The Magic Whip	Released: 27 April 2015 (UK); Label: Parlophone; Formats: CD, LP, digital download	1	5	15	3	3	5	4	8	30	24	FRA: 25,000 (Note: Sales as of December 2015)	BPI: Gold
The Ballad of Darren	Released: 21 July 2023 (UK); Label: Parlophone; Formats: CD, cassette, LP, digital download, blu-ray	1	10	—	4	3	20	—	7	12	94		BPI: Silver
"—" denotes a recording that did not chart or was not released in that territory.

=== Live albums ===
List of live albums, with selected chart positions
Title	Album details	Peak chart positions	
Title	Album details	UK	JPN
Live at the Budokan	Released: 22 May 1996 (JPN); Label: Food; Formats: CD	77	36
All the People: Blur Live at Hyde Park 02 July 2009 (Note: All the People: Blur Live at Hyde Park 02 July 2009 and All the People: Blur Live at Hyde Park 03 July 2009 charted as a double CD set in Japan.)	Released: 30 August 2009 (UK); Label: Parlophone; Formats: CD, digital download	70	148
All the People: Blur Live at Hyde Park 03 July 2009	Released: 30 August 2009 (UK); Label: Parlophone; Formats: CD, digital download	44	148
Live 2009	Released: 22 November 2009 (UK); Label: Parlophone; Formats: CD	—	—
Parklive	Released: 13 August 2012 (UK); Label: EMI, Parlophone; Formats: CD, digital download	91	137
Live at Wembley Stadium	Released: 26 July 2024; Label: Parlophone; Formats: CD, LP, digital download	6	—
"—" denotes a recording that did not chart or was not released in that territory.

=== Compilation albums ===
List of compilation albums, with selected chart positions and certifications
Title	Album details	Peak chart positions										Certifications
Title	Album details	UK	AUS	CAN	GER	IRL	JPN	NOR	NZ	SWE	US	Certifications
The Special Collectors Edition	Released: 26 October 1994 (JPN); Label: Food; Formats: CD	86	—	—	—	—	64	—	—	—	—	
Blur: The Best Of	Released: 30 October 2000 (UK); Labels: Food, EMI; Formats: CD, LP	3	23	14	35	3	20	13	6	22	186	BPI: 5× Platinum; ARIA: Gold; RMNZ: Gold
Midlife: A Beginner's Guide to Blur	Released: 15 June 2009 (UK); Labels: EMI; Formats: CD, digital download	20	—	—	—	—	66	—	—	—	—	BPI: Gold
"—" denotes a recording that did not chart or was not released in that territory.

=== Remix albums ===
List of remix albums, with selected chart positions
Title	Album details	Peak chart positions				Certifications
Title	Album details	UK	AUS	HUN	JPN	Certifications
Bustin' + Dronin'	Released: 25 February 1998 (UK); Label: Food; Formats: CD, cassette	100	163	19	50	RIAJ: Gold

=== Video albums ===
List of video albums, with selected chart positions
Title	Album details	Peak chart positions		Certifications
Title	Album details	UK Video	US Video	Certifications
Showtime	Released: 13 February 1995 (UK); Label: Food; Formats: VHS, Laserdisc	—	—	BPI: Gold
Blur: The Best Of	Released: 13 November 2000 (UK); Labels: Food, EMI; Formats: DVD, VHS	49	32	BPI: Gold
"—" denotes a recording that did not chart or was not released in that territory.

== Extended plays ==
List of extended plays
Title	EP details
Live	Released: 1997 (NLD); Label: Food; Format: CD
The Observer CD	Released: 1999 (UK); Label: Food; Format: CD
Exclusive 5 Track CD	Released: 21 September 2003 (UK); Label: Parlophone; Format: CD
Blur Live from the BRITs	Released: 22 February 2012 (UK); Label: Parlophone; Format: Digital download

== Box sets ==
List of compilation albums, with selected chart positions and certifications
Title	Album details	Peak chart positions		
Title	Album details	UK	GER	JPN
The Brit Pop Blur Box	Released: 1994 (Australia); Format: CD box set	—	—	—
The 10 Year Limited Edition Anniversary Box Set	Released: 6 September 1999 (UK); Label: Food; Format: CD box set	—	—	—
Blur 21	Released: 30 July 2012 (UK); Label: EMI; Formats: CD box set, LP box set, DVD box set	71	63	70
"—" denotes a recording that did not chart or was not released in that territory.

== Singles ==
List of singles, with selected chart positions and certifications, showing year released and album name
Title	Year	Peak chart positions										Certifications	Album
Title	Year	UK	AUS	BEL	FRA	IRL	JPN	NLD	NZ	SWE	US	Certifications	Album
"She's So High / I Know"	1990	48	—	—	—	—	—	—	—	—	—		Leisure
"There's No Other Way"	1991	8	113	—	—	19	—	—	—	—	82	BPI: Silver	Leisure
"Bang"	1991	24	189	—	—	21	—	—	—	—	—		Leisure
"Popscene" (Note: "Popscene" and "On Your Own" charted as a double A-side single in Australia.)	1992	32	—	—	—	—	—	—	—	—	—		Non-album single
"For Tomorrow"	1993	28	119	—	—	—	—	—	—	—	—		Modern Life Is Rubbish
"Chemical World"	1993	28	—	—	—	—	—	—	—	—	—		Modern Life Is Rubbish
"Sunday Sunday"	1993	26	—	—	—	—	—	—	—	—	—		Modern Life Is Rubbish
"Girls & Boys"	1994	5	19	34	11	23	— (Note: "Girls & Boys" did not enter the Billboard Japan Hot 100 chart, but peaked at number 12 on the Billboard Japan Hot Overseas chart.)	24	16	30	59	BPI: Platinum; RMNZ: Gold	Parklife
"To the End"	1994	16	198	—	—	—	—	—	—	—	—		Parklife
"Parklife"	1994	10	119	—	—	30	—	—	—	—	—	BPI: 2× Platinum; RMNZ: Gold	Parklife
"End of a Century"	1994	19	—	49	—	—	—	—	—	—	—		Parklife
"Country House"	1995	1	28	—	—	1	—	— (Note: "Country House" did not enter the Netherlands Singles Chart but peaked on the Dutch Tipparade Chart at number 14.)	30	10	—	BPI: Platinum	The Great Escape
"The Universal"	1995	5	104	—	—	12	—	—	—	55	—	BPI: Gold	The Great Escape
"Stereotypes"	1996	7	95	—	—	13	—	—	—	—	—		The Great Escape
"Charmless Man"	1996	5	35	—	33	25	—	—	—	—	—	BPI: Silver	The Great Escape
"It Could Be You" (Japan only)	1996	—	—	—	—	—	—	—	—	—	—		The Great Escape
"Beetlebum"	1997	1	35	—	—	8	— (Note: "Beetlebum" did not enter the Billboard Japan Hot 100 chart, but peaked at number 84 on the Oricon Singles Chart.)	87	34	39	—	BPI: Gold	Blur
"Song 2"	1997	2	4	— (Note: "Song 2" did not enter the Flanders Ultratop 50, but peaked at eight on the Flanders Ultratip chart.)	198	10	— (Note: "Song 2" did not enter the Billboard Japan Hot 100 chart, but peaked at number 14 on the Billboard Japan Hot Overseas chart.)	73	—	28	— (Note: "Song 2" did not enter the Billboard Hot 100, but peaked at number 55 on the Hot 100 Airplay chart.)	BPI: 3× Platinum; ARIA: Gold; RMNZ: 4× Platinum	Blur
"On Your Own"	1997	5	69	—	—	27	—	—	—	—	—		Blur
"M.O.R."	1997	15	68	—	—	—	—	—	45	—	— (Note: "M.O.R." did not enter the Billboard Hot 100, but peaked at number 14 on the Bubbling Under Hot 100 Singles chart, which acts as an extension to the Hot 100.)		Blur
"Tender"	1999	2	32	— (Note: "Tender" did not enter the Flanders Ultratop 50, but peaked at 15 on the Flanders Ultratip chart.)	—	6	—	90	12	29	—	BPI: Platinum; RMNZ: Gold	13
"Coffee & TV"	1999	11	—	—	178	26	—	—	—	—	—	BPI: Gold	13
"No Distance Left to Run"	1999	14	—	—	—	—	—	—	—	—	—		13
"Music Is My Radar"	2000	10	—	—	—	35	—	—	—	—	—		Blur: The Best Of
"Don't Bomb When You're the Bomb"	2002	—	—	—	—	—	—	—	—	—	—		Non-album single
"Out of Time"	2003	5	113	—	—	17	—	—	—	19	—		Think Tank
"Crazy Beat"	2003	18	102	—	—	41	—	—	—	20	—		Think Tank
"Good Song"	2003	22	—	—	—	—	—	—	—	—	—		Think Tank
"Fool's Day"	2010	— (Note: "Fool's Day" did not enter the UK Singles Chart, but peaked at number 10 on the UK Physical Singles Chart.)	—	—	—	—	—	—	—	—	—		Non-album singles
"Under the Westway" / "The Puritan"	2012	34	—	— (Note: "Under the Westway" did not enter the Flanders Ultratop 50, but peaked at 10 on the Flanders Ultratip chart.)	120	54	59	—	—	—	—		Non-album singles
"Under the Westway" / "The Puritan"	2012	—	—	—	165	67	—	—	—	—	—		Non-album singles
"Go Out"	2015	182	—	— (Note: "Go Out" did not enter the Flanders Ultratop 50, but peaked at 64 on the Flanders Ultratip chart.)	188	—	77	—	—	—	—		The Magic Whip
"There Are Too Many of Us"	2015	—	—	—	—	—	—	—	—	—	—		The Magic Whip
"Lonesome Street"	2015	151	—	— (Note: "Lonesome Street" did not enter the Flanders Ultratop 50, but peaked at eight on the Flanders Ultratip chart.)	181	—	50	—	—	—	—		The Magic Whip
"Ong Ong"	2015	—	—	— (Note: "Ong Ong" did not enter the Flanders Ultratop 50, but peaked at nine on the Flanders Ultratip chart.)	—	—	—	—	—	—	—		The Magic Whip
"I Broadcast"	2015	—	—	—	—	—	—	—	—	—	—		The Magic Whip
"The Narcissist"	2023	81	—	—	—	—	— (Note: "The Narcissist" did not enter the Billboard Japan Hot 100 chart, but peaked at number 17 on the Billboard Japan Hot Overseas chart.)	—	— (Note: "The Narcissist" did not enter the NZ Top 40 Singles Chart, but peaked at number 33 on the NZ Hot Singles Chart.)	—	—		The Ballad of Darren
"St. Charles Square"	2023	—	—	—	—	—	—	—	—	—	—		The Ballad of Darren
"Barbaric"	2023	—	—	—	—	—	— (Note: "Barbaric" did not enter the Billboard Japan Hot 100 chart, but peaked at number 19 on the Billboard Japan Hot Overseas chart.)	—	— (Note: "Barbaric" did not enter the NZ Top 40 Singles Chart, but peaked at number 36 on the NZ Hot Singles Chart.)	—	—		The Ballad of Darren
"—" denotes a recording that did not chart or was not released in that territory.

=== Promotional singles ===
List of promotional singles, showing year released and album name
Title	Year	Peak chart positions	Album
Title	Year	UK	Album
"High Cool" / "Bad Day"	1991	—	Leisure
"Bang" (Mindwarp Mutations Remixes)	1992	—	—N/a
"The Wassailing Song"	1992	—	—N/a
"This Is a Low"	1995	—	Parklife
"Tracy Jacks" / "Bank Holiday"	1995	—	Parklife
"Entertain Me" (The Live It! Remix)	1995	—	—N/a
"Death of a Party"	1997	—	Blur
"Bugman"	1999	—	13
"We've Got a File on You"	2003	—	Think Tank
"Y'all Doomed"	2015	165	The Magic Whip
"—" denotes a recording that did not chart or was not released in that territory.

== Other charted songs ==
List of songs, with selected chart positions, showing year released and album name
Title	Year	Peak chart positions		Album
Title	Year	UK	BEL Tip	Album
"Girls & Boys" (live)	2009	191	—	All the People: Blur Live at Hyde Park 02 July 2009
"Ghost Ship"	2015	—	68	The Magic Whip
"—" denotes a recording that did not chart or was not released in that territory.

== Other appearances ==
List of non-single guest appearances, with other performing artists, showing year released and album name
Title	Year	Other artist(s)	Album
"Sunday Sunday" (live)	1992	none	In a Field of Their Own: Highlights of Glastonbury 1992
"Maggie May"	1992	none	Ruby Trax – The NME's Roaring 40
"Oliver's Army"	1993	none	Peace Together
"Substitute"	1993	none	Who Covers Who?
"Miss America" (live)	1993	none	The Adventure Club Sessions
"Eine Kleine Lift Musik"	1995	none	The Help Album
"The Universal" (live)	1996	none	...Later Volume One: Brit Beat
"Girls & Boys" (Pet Shop Boys Remix)	1997	none	In the Mix '97, Vol. 1
"Never Clever"	1997	none	Food 100
"Beetlebum" (live)	1997	none	Tibetan Freedom Concert
"She's So High" (live)	1997	none	Long Live Tibet
"Cowboy Song"	1998	none	Dead Man on Campus soundtrack
"101%"	1999	Thurston Moore	Root
"Kissin' Time"	2002	Marianne Faithfull	Kissin Time
"Girls & Boys (live)"	2014	none	Britpop at the BBC

== Videography ==
=== Music videos ===
List of music videos, showing year released and director
Title	Year	Director(s)
"She's So High"	1990	David Balfe
"There's No Other Way" (version 1)	1991	David Balfe
"Bang"	1991	Willy Smax
"There's No Other Way" (version 2)	1991	Matthew Amos
"Popscene"	1992	David Mould
"For Tomorrow"	1993	Julien Temple
"Chemical World"	1993	Dwight Clarke
"Sunday Sunday"	1993	Dwight Clarke
"Girls & Boys"	1994	Kevin Godley
"To the End"	1994	David Mould
"Parklife"	1994	Pedro Romhanyi
"End of a Century"	1994	Matthew Longfellow
"Country House"	1995	Damien Hirst
"The Universal"	1995	Jonathan Glazer
"Stereotypes"	1996	Matthew Longfellow
"Charmless Man"	1996	Jamie Thraves
"Beetlebum"	1997	Sophie Muller
"Song 2"	1997	Sophie Muller
"On Your Own"	1997	Sophie Muller
"M.O.R."	1997	John Hardwick
"Tender"	1999	Grant Gee
"Coffee & TV"	1999	Hammer & Tongs
"No Distance Left to Run"	1999	Thomas Vinterberg
"Music Is My Radar"	2000	Don Cameron
"Don't Bomb When You're the Bomb"	2002	Thomas Vinterberg
"Out of Time"	2003	John Hardwick
"Crazy Beat" (version 1)	2003	Shynola
"Crazy Beat" (version 2)	2003	John Hardwick
"Good Song"	2003	Shynola, David Shrigley
"Fool's Day"	2010	Pulse Films
"Under the Westway"	2012	Giorgio Testi
"The Puritan"	2012	Giorgio Testi
"Go Out"	2015	Tony Hung
"There Are Too Many of Us"	2015	Blur
"Lonesome Street"	2015	Ben Reed
"Ong Ong"	2015	Tony Hung
"I Broadcast"	2015	Tony Hung
"St. Charles Square"	2023	Toby L

=== Documentaries ===
List of documentaries
Title	Details
Starshaped	Released: 12 September 1993; Distributor: Parlophone, Ventura Distribution; Director: Ceri Levy
The Great Escape	Filmed in 1995 on Blur's seaside tour; Unreleased documentary directed and produced by Matthew Longfellow and Ceri Levy
No Distance Left to Run	Released: 19 January 2010; Distributor: Pulse Films; Directors: Dylan Southern and Will Lovelace
New World Towers	Released: 2 December 2015; Distributor: Parlophone, Eleven Films; Director: Sam Wrench; Note: Limited theatrical release in select UK cinemas
To the End	Released: 19 July 2024; Distributor: Parlophone, Eleven Films; Director: Toby L; Note: Worldwide release with Live at Wembley Stadium

== See also ==
- Damon Albarn discography
- The Good, the Bad & the Queen discography
- Gorillaz discography
- Graham Coxon discography
