= Parklive =

Live album by Blur
- Released: 13 August 2012 (iTunes Store); 20 August 2012 (CD); 3 December 2012 (DVD) (Special Edition)
- Recorded: 12 August 2012
- Venue: Hyde Park, London
- Genre: Britpop, alternative rock
- Length: 125:13
- Label: EMI, Parlophone

Blur chronology
| Blur 21 (2012) | Parklive (2012) | The Magic Whip (2015) |

Damon Albarn chronology
| Blur 21 (2012) | Parklive (2012) | Maison Des Jeunes (2013) |

Professional ratings
Aggregate scores
| Source | Rating |
|---|---|
| Metacritic | 85/100 |
Review scores
| Source | Rating |
| AllMusic | 4/5 stars |
| Drowned in Sound | 8/10 |
| Pitchfork | 8.5/10 |
| Record Collector | 3/5 stars |
| Uncut | 8/10 |
| Under the Radar | 7.5/10 |

Parklive is the third live album by British rock band Blur, released on 13 August 2012. The live album recorded the band's performance at Hyde Park, London on 12 August 2012, as part of the companion concert to the 2012 Summer Olympics closing ceremony. The title is a play on their 1994 album Parklife.

The digital download was released onto the iTunes Store within a day of the band's performance. The CD version was released the following week, with a bonus disc of live unreleased rarities. A deluxe edition was released in December 2012, which, in addition to the three CDs in the CD edition, contains the Hyde Park performance on DVD and a CD of the band's performance at the 100 Club.

== Track listing ==
Disc one
| No. | Title | Original release | Length |
|---|---|---|---|
| 1. | "Girls & Boys" | Parklife | 5:07 |
| 2. | "London Loves" | Parklife | 3:32 |
| 3. | "Tracy Jacks" | Parklife | 4:26 |
| 4. | "Jubilee" | Parklife | 3:00 |
| 5. | "Beetlebum" | Blur | 6:00 |
| 6. | "Coffee & TV" | 13 | 4:58 |
| 7. | "Out of Time" | Think Tank | 4:42 |
| 8. | "Young and Lovely" | "Chemical World" (single) | 5:12 |
| 9. | "Trimm Trabb" | 13 | 5:28 |
| 10. | "Caramel" | 13 | 5:04 |
| 11. | "Sunday Sunday" | Modern Life Is Rubbish | 3:34 |
| 12. | "Country House" | The Great Escape | 4:28 |
| 13. | "Parklife" (featuring Phil Daniels) | Parklife | 3:44 |
| Total length: | | | 59:15 |

Disc two
| No. | Title | Original release | Length |
|---|---|---|---|
| 1. | "Colin Zeal" | Modern Life Is Rubbish | 3:18 |
| 2. | "Popscene" | "Popscene" (single) | 3:50 |
| 3. | "Advert" | Modern Life Is Rubbish | 4:28 |
| 4. | "Song 2" | Blur | 2:50 |
| 5. | "No Distance Left to Run" | 13 | 3:57 |
| 6. | "Tender" | 13 | 9:09 |
| 7. | "This Is a Low" | Parklife | 7:58 |
| 8. | "Sing" | Leisure | 5:49 |
| 9. | "Under the Westway / Intermission" | "Under the Westway" (single) / Modern Life Is Rubbish | 6:33 |
| 10. | "End of a Century" | Parklife | 3:39 |
| 11. | "For Tomorrow" | Modern Life Is Rubbish | 6:42 |
| 12. | "The Universal" | The Great Escape | 4:45 |
| Total length: | | | 65:58 |

Disc three (CD only)
| No. | Title | Original release | Length |
|---|---|---|---|
| 1. | "Under the Westway (Live from 13 – Matt Butcher Mix)" | "Under the Westway" (single) | 4:21 |
| 2. | "The Puritan (Live from 13 – Matt Butcher Mix)" | "Under the Westway" (single) | 3:16 |
| 3. | "Mr Briggs (BBC Maida Vale session)" | "There's No Other Way" (single) | 3:30 |
| 4. | "London Loves (Live at Wolverhampton Civic Hall 6 August 2012)" | Parklife | 3:41 |
| 5. | "Young and Lovely (Live at Wolverhampton Civic Hall 6 August 2012)" | "Chemical World" (single) | 4:39 |
| 6. | "Colin Zeal (Live at Wolverhampton Civic Hall 6 August 2012)" | Modern Life is Rubbish | 3:09 |
| 7. | "The Puritan (Live at Wolverhampton Civic Hall 6 August 2012)" | "Under the Westway" (single) | 4:39 |
| 8. | "No Distance Left to Run (Live at Wolverhampton Civic Hall 6 August 2012)" | 13 | 3:51 |
| 9. | "This Is a Low (Live at Wolverhampton Civic Hall 6 August 2012)" | Parklife | 6:57 |
| Total length: | | | 37:12 |

== Personnel ==
Blur

- Damon Albarn – vocals, acoustic guitar, keyboards
- Graham Coxon – vocals, electric & acoustic guitars, lap steel guitar
- Alex James – bass guitar
- Dave Rowntree – drums

with

- Mike Smith – keyboards, saxophone, clarinet
- Alistair White, Barnaby Dickinson, Dan Carpenter – brass
- Wayne Hernandez, Wendi Rose, Janet Ramus, Tyrone Henry – backing vocals
- Phil Daniels – vocals on "Parklife"
- Harry Enfield – 'The Tea Lady' on "Parklife"
- Khyam Allami – oud on "Out of Time"
