= All the People: Blur Live at Hyde Park =

All The People: Blur Live at Hyde Park
- 2 July cover

Live album by Blur
- Released: August 2009
- Recorded: 2 July 2009 and 3 July 2009
- Venue: Hyde Park, London, UK
- Genre: Britpop; alternative rock
- Length: 123:22 (2 July 2009); 122:22 (3 July 2009)
- Label: Parlophone

Blur chronology
Midlife: A Beginner's Guide to Blur (2009)	All The People: Blur Live at Hyde Park (2009)	Blur 21 (2012)

Damon Albarn chronology
Midlife: A Beginner's Guide to Blur (2009)	All the People: Blur Live at Hyde Park (2009)	Plastic Beach (2010)

Alternative cover
- 3 July cover

Professional ratings
Review scores
Source	Rating
Allmusic	3.5/5 stars

All the People: Blur Live at Hyde Park is a pair of live albums by English band Blur, recorded during their Hyde Park reunion shows on 2 and 3 July 2009. The albums were initially exclusively available on the Sandbag website at £15 for the double CD, or £10 for the mp3 download. The title All the People is a lyric from their song "Parklife".

== Release ==
All the People was first released exclusively through the Live Here Now online store on 30 August 2009 as a double disc CD or 320 kbit/s digital download. Although the two performances were released as separate albums for each date, both versions had the same track listing. On 23 November 2009, the albums were available to buy from other stores.

== Live 2009 ==
To promote the album, a promotional live album was given free in The Sunday Times. The album, titled Live 2009, contains ten tracks performed through various concerts in their 2009 tour, including the "Song 2" performance found on 2 July album and "The Universal" performance found on 3 July album.

It was released in the magazine on 22 November 2009, alongside Culture: The Summer of Blur book.

== Track listing ==
All tracks written by Damon Albarn, Graham Coxon, Alex James, Dave Rowntree, except for "Out of Time" written by Albarn, James, Rowntree.

The track lengths given as 2 July / 3 July.

=== Disc one ===
1. "She's So High" – 5:00 / 5:19 (from Leisure)
2. "Girls & Boys" – 5:02 / 4:40 (from Parklife)
3. "Tracy Jacks" – 4:31 / 4:32 (from Parklife)
4. "There's No Other Way" – 4:14 / 3:55 (from Leisure)
5. "Jubilee" – 3:01 / 3:11 (from Parklife)
6. "Badhead" – 3:48 / 3:59 (from Parklife)
7. "Beetlebum" – 6:50 / 7:00 (from Blur)
8. "Out of Time" – 3:58 / 3:53 (from Think Tank)
9. "Trimm Trabb" – 5:25 / 5:15 (from 13)
10. "Coffee & TV" – 5:30 / 5:27 (from 13)
11. "Tender" – 9:09 / 9:25 (from 13)

=== Disc two ===
1. "Country House" – 5:08 / 5:18 (from The Great Escape)
2. "Oily Water" – 4:20 / 4:35 (from Modern Life Is Rubbish)
3. "Chemical World" – 5:08 / 4:42 (from Modern Life Is Rubbish)
4. "Sunday Sunday" – 3:52 / 3:01 (from Modern Life Is Rubbish)
5. "Parklife" – 3:12 / 3:37 (from Parklife)
6. "End of a Century" – 3:30 / 3:05 (from Parklife)
7. "To the End" – 4:24 / 4:24 (from Parklife)
8. "This Is a Low" – 8:37 / 8:46 (from Parklife)
9. "Popscene" – 2:57 / 2:55 (Single)
10. "Advert" – 3:23 / 3:14 (from Modern Life Is Rubbish)
11. "Song 2" – 5:53 / 5:21 (from Blur)
12. "Death of a Party" – 5:16 / 4:56 (from Blur)
13. "For Tomorrow" – 6:28 / 7:08 (from Modern Life Is Rubbish)
14. "The Universal" – 4:46 / 4:44 (from The Great Escape)

=== Live 2009 ===
1. "She's So High" (Goldsmith College, University of London, 22 June)
2. "Girls & Boys" (Goldsmith College, University of London, 22 June)
3. "Badhead" (East Anglian Railway Museum, Colchester, 13 June)
4. "Beetlebum" (Cliff's Pavilion, Southend, 21 June)
5. "Parklife" (Civic Hall, Wolverhampton, 24 June)
6. "Out of Time" (MEN Arena, Manchester, 26 June)
7. "Song 2" (Hyde Park, London, 2 July)
8. "Popscene" (O2 Academy, Newcastle, 25 June)
9. "Tender" (Glastonbury Festival, 28 June)
10. "The Universal" (Hyde Park, London, 3 July)

== Personnel ==
=== Blur ===
- Damon Albarn – vocals, acoustic guitar
- Graham Coxon – guitars, lap steel guitar and vocals
- Alex James – bass guitar, upright bass
- Dave Rowntree – drums and percussion

=== Extra personnel ===
- Mike Smith – keyboards, saxophone, clarinet
- Phil Daniels – guest vocals on "Parklife"
- Wayne Hernandez – backing vocalist
- Sam Freeman – backing vocalist
- Wendi Rose – backing vocalist
- Janet Ramus – backing vocalist
- Dave Williamson – trombone
- Daniel Carpenter – trumpet
- Alistair White – euphonium

== Chart performance ==
Both albums entered the UK Albums Chart in the first week of September 2009 for one week only. The 3 July 2009 version charted the higher of the two albums at number 44.

Chart (2009)	Peak Position
UK Albums Chart (2 July 2009)	70
UK Albums Chart (3 July 2009)	44
