= Brit Awards 1995 =

British music awards ceremony

- Date: 20 February 1995
- Venue: Alexandra Palace
- Hosted by: Chris Evans

Television/radio coverage
- Network: ITV

Brit Awards 1995 was the 15th edition of the Brit Awards, an annual pop music awards ceremony in the United Kingdom. It was organised by the British Phonographic Industry and took place on 20 February 1995 at Alexandra Palace in London. Blur won four awards, the most any artist gained in a single ceremony.

== Performances ==
- Blur – "Girls & Boys"
- East 17 – "Let It Rain"
- Eddi Reader – "Patience of Angels"
- Elton John – "Believe", "Philadelphia Freedom" & "I'm Still Standing"
- Eternal – "Baby Love"
- Sting & M People – "If You Love Somebody Set Them Free"
- Madonna – "Bedtime Story"
- Take That – "Back for Good"

== Winners and nominees ==
British Album of the Year	British Producer of the Year
Blur – Parklife; Eternal – Always & Forever; Massive Attack – Protection; Oasis – Definitely Maybe; Pink Floyd – The Division Bell	Nellee Hooper; Ed Buller; Stephen Street; Trevor Horn
British Single of the Year	British Video of the Year
Blur – "Parklife"; Blur – "Girls & Boys"; East 17 – "Stay Another Day"; Oasis – "Live Forever"; Wet Wet Wet – "Love Is All Around" Eliminated; China Black – "Searching"; D:Ream – "Things Can Only Get Better"; The Grid – "Texas Cowboys"; Michelle Gayle – "Sweetness"; Tom Jones – "If I Only Knew"	Blur – "Parklife"; Jamiroquai – "Space Cowboy"; The Rolling Stones – "Love Is Strong"; Seal – "Prayer for the Dying"; Suede – "The Wild Ones"
British Male Solo Artist	British Female Solo Artist
Paul Weller; Elvis Costello; Eric Clapton; Morrissey; Seal	Eddi Reader; Des'ree; Kate Bush; Lisa Stansfield; Michelle Gayle
British Group	British Breakthrough Act
Blur; Eternal; M People; Oasis; Pink Floyd	Oasis; Echobelly; Eternal; PJ & Duncan; Portishead
British Dance Act	Soundtrack/Cast Recording
M People; The Brand New Heavies; Eternal; Massive Attack; The Prodigy	Pulp Fiction; Forrest Gump; Four Weddings and a Funeral; The Lion King; Philadelphia
International Male Solo Artist	International Female Solo Artist
Prince; Bryan Adams; Luther Vandross; Warren G; Youssou N'Dour	k.d. lang; Kylie Minogue; Madonna; Sinéad O'Connor; Tori Amos
International Group	International Breakthrough Act
R.E.M.; Counting Crows; The Cranberries; Crash Test Dummies; Neil Young & Crazy Horse	Lisa Loeb; Carleen Anderson; Counting Crows; Marcella Detroit; Warren G

=== Outstanding Contribution to Music ===
- Elton John
