= Ian Birrell =

British journalist

- Education: University of Aberdeen
- Occupation: Journalist

Ian Birrell is a British journalist and former speechwriter to Prime Minister David Cameron. He has been a columnist at several newspapers including the i and UnHerd. From 1998 to 2010, Birrell was deputy editor-in-chief of The Independent.

== Education ==
Birrell was educated at Ampleforth College, a Roman Catholic boarding independent school for boys (now coeducational), in the village of Ampleforth in North Yorkshire, followed by the University of Aberdeen.

== Journalism ==
Birrell has reported as a foreign correspondent for British newspapers from Egypt, Haiti, Iraq, Israel, North Korea, Pakistan, Russia, Syria, and others.

Birrell is a campaigner for the rights of people with learning disabilities and autism who are locked up in British psychiatric institutions. He has investigated and written extensively on this issue and has received several awards for this work.

Birrell reported on the case of 12-year-old Billy Caldwell from Northern Ireland who needed medical cannabis for his epilepsy and was forced to go overseas to get it as it was illegal in Britain. The report created a scandal that forced the British government to change the law and legalize medical cannabis.

== Television and radio ==
Birrell presented the BBC Panorama programme Tough Justice that featured Michael Gove

Sky News All Out Politics podcast What Next for Global Britain, hosted by Adam Boulton

The Andrew Marr Show

== Music ==
Birrell co-founded the charity Africa Express with musician Damon Albarn to encourage collaboration between African, Middle Eastern and Western musicians Birrell was executive producer of the Africa Express albums Presents (2009) and Terry's in C Mali (2015).

== Awards ==
- Edgar Wallace Award (2013)
- Foreign Reporter of the Year Society of Editors Press Awards (2015)
- Press Awards Foreign Reporter of the Year (2015)
- Popular Journalism Award, British Journalism Awards (2018)
- Health Journalist of the Year, British Press Awards (2018)
- Health Journalist of the Year, Editor's Press Awards (2019)
- Amnesty UK Media Award- News- Locked up for Autism 2019
- The Orwell Prize - Exposing Britain's social evils 2020

== Personal life ==
Birrell has a daughter, Iona, who suffers from severe epilepsy.
