= Parklife (disambiguation) =

Parklife is an album by Blur.

It may also refer to:

- "Parklife" (song), a song from the above album
- Parklife Music Festival, a former annual Australian music festival held from 2000 to 2013
- Parklife (festival), an annual music festival held in Manchester, United Kingdom
- "Parklife", the sixth expansion park for the city building game Cities: Skylines
