= Midlife: A Beginner's Guide to Blur =

Greatest hits album by Blur
- Released: 15 June 2009 (UK); 28 July 2009 (US)
- Recorded: 1990 – 1998; 2002
- Genre: Britpop, alternative rock
- Length: 107:46
- Label: EMI
- Producer: Stephen Street, William Orbit, Ben Hillier, Steve Lovell, Steve Power

Blur chronology
Think Tank (2003)	Midlife: A Beginner's Guide to Blur (2009)	All the People: Blur Live at Hyde Park (2009)

Damon Albarn chronology
Journey to the West (2008)	Midlife: A Beginner's Guide to Blur (2009)	All the People: Blur Live at Hyde Park (2009)

Professional ratings
Aggregate scores
Source	Rating
Metacritic	86/100
Review scores
Source	Rating
AllMusic	4/5 stars
The A.V. Club	A
Digital Spy	5/5 stars
The Line of Best Fit	90%
musicOMH	5/5 stars
Pitchfork	9.4/10
Q	4/5 stars
Record Collector	4/5 stars
Rolling Stone	3.5/5 stars
Uncut	5/5 stars

Midlife: A Beginner's Guide to Blur is a two-disc compilation album by Blur, released by EMI Records on 15 June 2009. It is Blur's second retrospective collection, succeeding 2000's Blur: The Best Of and coincides with the band's 2009 reunion performances.

== Background ==
Spanning the breadth of Blur's recorded history from its inception, Midlife: A Beginner's Guide to Blur features a larger sampling of material from 1993's Modern Life Is Rubbish (including the single-only "Popscene" from the same era) than on Blur: The Best Of, in addition to material from 2003's Think Tank.

== Track listing ==
All songs written by Blur (Albarn/Coxon/James/Rowntree), except for "Out of Time" and "Good Song", which were written by Albarn/James/Rowntree.

Disc one
No.	Title	Original album	Length
1.	"Beetlebum"	Blur, 1997	5:04
2.	"Girls & Boys" (single edit)	Parklife, 1994	4:19
3.	"For Tomorrow" (Visit to Primrose Hill extended version)	Modern Life Is Rubbish, 1993	6:00
4.	"Coffee & TV" (single edit)	13, 1999	5:19
5.	"Out of Time"	Think Tank, 2003	3:52
6.	"Blue Jeans"	Modern Life Is Rubbish	3:53
7.	"Song 2"	Blur	2:02
8.	"Bugman"	13	4:51
9.	"He Thought of Cars"	The Great Escape, 1995	4:16
10.	"Death of a Party" (7″ remix)	Blur	4:15
11.	"The Universal"	The Great Escape	3:59
12.	"Sing"	Leisure, 1991	6:01
13.	"This Is a Low"	Parklife	5:00

Disc two
No.	Title	Original album	Length
1.	"Tender"	13	7:42
2.	"She's So High" (single edit)	Leisure	3:50
3.	"Chemical World" (radio edit)	Modern Life Is Rubbish	3:53
4.	"Good Song"	Think Tank	3:06
5.	"Parklife"	Parklife	3:07
6.	"Advert"	Modern Life Is Rubbish	3:44
7.	"Popscene"	Non-album single, 1992	3:15
8.	"Stereotypes"	The Great Escape	3:11
9.	"Trimm Trabb"	13	5:37
10.	"Badhead"	Parklife	3:28
11.	"Strange News from Another Star"	Blur	4:03
12.	"Battery in Your Leg"	Think Tank	3:20

Japanese edition bonus track
No.	Title	Length
13.	"Tender" (Cornelius Remix)	5:22

== Personnel ==
=== Musicians ===
- Damon Albarn – vocals, keyboards, acoustic guitar
- Graham Coxon – guitars, backing vocals, lead vocals on "Coffee & TV", co-lead vocals on "Tender" (not featured on "Out of Time" or "Good Song")
- Alex James – bass
- Dave Rowntree – drums

=== Other personnel ===
- Blur – Producer
- Jack Clark – Mixing Assistant
- Al Clay – Mixing
- Jason Cox – Engineer
- Tom Girling – Assistant Producer
- Stephen Hague – Producer, Engineer
- Ben Hillier – Producer, Mixing
- Jeff Knowler – Assistant Engineer
- Damian leGassick – Programming
- Steve Lovell – Producer
- Gerard Navarro – Assistant Engineer
- William Orbit – Producer, Engineer
- James Oliver – Design
- Steve Power – Producer
- Iain Roberton – Assistant Engineer
- Andy Ross – Engineer
- John Smith – Producer, Engineer
- Sean Spuehler – Programming
- Stephen Street – Producer, Engineer

== Charts and certifications ==
=== Weekly charts ===
Chart	Position
Japanese Oricon Albums Chart	66
UK Albums Chart	20

=== Certifications ===
Region	Certification	Certified units/sales
United Kingdom (BPI)	Gold	100,000^{‡}
^{‡} Sales+streaming figures based on certification alone.
