= Live in Hyde Park =

Live in Hyde Park may refer to:

- Hyde Park Live, a Rolling Stones album
- Live in Hyde Park (Red Hot Chili Peppers album)
- All the People: Blur Live at Hyde Park
- London Calling: Live in Hyde Park, a Bruce Springsteen album
- Jeff Lynne's ELO: Live in Hyde Park
- Radio 2 Live in Hyde Park
- Queen Hyde Park 1976
- Live in Hyde Park (Eric Clapton album)
- King Crimson Live in Hyde Park
