= Maison Des Jeunes =

Studio album by Africa Express
- Released: 9 December 2013
- Recorded: 2013 - Africa
- Genre: African music
- Length: 47:04
- Label: Honest Jon's/EMI/Transgressive Records
- Producer: Damon Albarn, Two Inch Punch, Remi Kabaka Jr., Lil Silva, David Maclean, Batoma Sidibé, Olugbenga, Brian Eno, Ghostpoet

Damon Albarn chronology
| Parklive (2012) | Maison Des Jeunes (2013) | Everyday Robots (2014) |

Maison Des Jeunes is a 2013 album by musician Damon Albarn in collaboration with African musicians for the Africa Express project that Albarn launched in early 2013.

== Background ==
In October 2013, Damon Albarn spearheaded a week-long trip to Mali by a group of musicians including Brian Eno, Yeah Yeah Yeahs' Nick Zinner, members of Metronomy and Django Django, Holy Other, Lil Silva, Cid Rim, Two Inch Punch, and more. There, they collaborated with Malian musicians. The result is an album called Africa Express Presents: Maison Des Jeunes, released digitally on 9 December via Transgressive.

The record is a continuation of Albarn's Africa Express project, where western and African artists collaborate. (The previous year it resulted in a train tour across the UK). It was recorded in a temporary studio set up in a city youth club called Maison Des Jeunes.

There was an album launch event on 9 December at London's Oval Space, featuring debut UK performances by Songhoy Blues and Kankou Kouyaté, plus Ghostpoet, Metronomy's Olugbenga Adelekan, and Django Django's David Maclean. It also feature the UK premiere of the documentary on the 2012 Africa Express train tour.

== Track list ==
| No. | Title | Producer(s) | Length |
|---|---|---|---|
| 1. | "Fantainfalla Toyi Bolo" (Adama Koita) | Two Inch Punch | 3:37 |
| 2. | "Soubour" (Songhoy Blues) | Nick Zinner & Remi Kabaka Jr. | 3:38 |
| 3. | "Season Change" (Ghostpoet featuring Doucoura & Damon Albarn) | Two Inch Punch & Damon Albarn | 3:57 |
| 4. | "Dougoudé Sarrafo" (Bijou) | Damon Albarn | 3:28 |
| 5. | "Bouramsy" (Lil Silva) | Lil Silva | 3:49 |
| 6. | "Rapou Kanou" (Tal B Halala) | Two Inch Punch | 3:23 |
| 7. | "Yamore" (Gambari featuring Kankou Kouyaté) | Damon Albarn | 5:56 |
| 8. | "Chanson Denko Tapestry" (Yacouba Sissoko Band) | Brian Eno | 5:01 |
| 9. | "Deni Kelen Be Koko" (Lobi Traoré Band) | David Maclean | 5:46 |
| 10. | "Farafina" (Moussa Traoré) | Damon Albarn | 5:16 |
| 11. | "Latégué" (Tiemoko Sogodogo) | Brian Eno | 3:13 |

Bonus Tracks
| No. | Title | Producer(s) | Length |
|---|---|---|---|
| 12. | "Djoti Sayoro Don" (Ko Kan Ko Sata) | Damon Albarn & Two Inch Punch |
| 13. | "Milk" (Remi Kabaka featuring Batoma Sidibé) | Remi Kabaka & Batoma Sidibé |
| 14. | "Wade in the Water" (Gambari & Olugbenga) | Olugbenga |
| 15. | "Man Nyale Totebereye" (Tiemoko Sogodogo) | Brian Eno |
| 16. | "Another Power Cut" | Damon Albarn |
