= Songhoy Blues =

Malian blues rock band

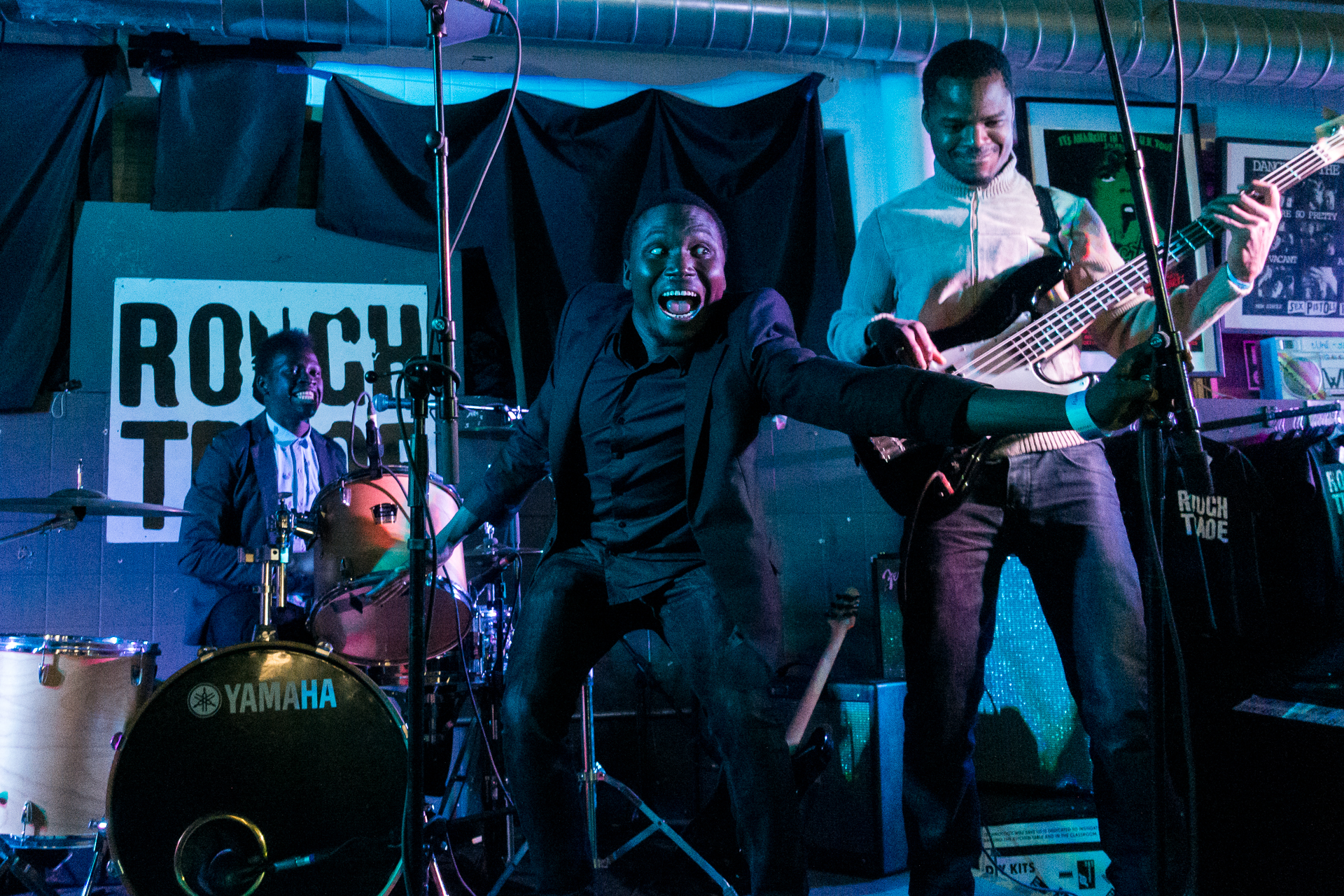
- Songhoy Blues at the Rough Trade club, New York City, February 2015

Background information
- Origin: Bamako, Mali
- Genres: Afro rock; blues rock; desert blues
- Years active: 2012–present
- Labels: Transgressive, Cult, Atlantic, Fat Possum
- Members: Garba Touré; Aliou Touré; Oumar Touré; Nathanael Dembélé
- Website: songhoyblues.com

Songhoy Blues is a desert blues music group from Timbuktu, Mali. The band was formed in Bamako after being forced to leave their homes during the civil conflict and the imposition of Sharia law. The band released its debut album, Music in Exile, via Transgressive Records on February 23, 2015, while Julian Casablancas' Cult Records partnered with Atlantic Records to release the album in North America in March 2015. The group is one of the principal subjects of the documentary film They Will Have To Kill Us First.

== Origins ==
In 2012, the National Movement for the Liberation of Azawad (MNLA) took control of the north of Mali. In turn, they were pushed out by Ansar Dine, a jihadist group which banned cigarettes, alcohol and music. Garba Touré, a guitarist from Diré, near Timbuktu, was forced to leave, and moved to Bamako, the country's capital, in the south. Together with Aliou Touré and Oumar Touré, they formed a band "... to recreate that lost ambience of the north and make all the refugees relive those northern songs." The three of them, unrelated despite having the same surname, are Songhoy people. The name of the band comes from their ethnicity and the genre of music they play, 'desert blues'.

== Career ==
Songhoy Blues began playing on the Bamako club circuit, attracting both Songhoy and Tuareg fans. In September 2013, Africa Express, a group of American and European musicians and producers led by Damon Albarn, visited Bamako to record an album of collaborations. The band auditioned successfully and were introduced to Nick Zinner, the American guitarist of the Yeah Yeah Yeahs. They worked with Zinner to record "Soubour," meaning patience. The track was released in December 2013 on Maison Des Jeunes, the 2013 Africa Express compilation.

Following the success of "Soubour", the band returned to the studio with Zinner and co-producer Marc-Antoine Moreau to work on an album. Their debut album, Music in Exile, was released on Transgressive Records in February 2015 and on Cult Records, via Atlantic Records, in North America in March 2015. It received "universal acclaim" according to the review aggregating website Metacritic. Robin Denselow, writing for The Guardian, described the album as "an impressively varied and rousing set", and named Songhoy Blues "[a] band to watch". In the NME, Kevin EG Perry described the album as "a masterpiece of desert blues; blending American guitar licks with Malian groove".

The band were nominated for "Best New Act" at the 2015 Q Awards and as "Independent Breakthrough Act" at the 2015 AIM Awards. They supported Alabama Shakes at the Beacon Theatre in New York, and were subsequently called "insistent and determined but also headed for the ecstatic" in a review posted by The New York Times They have also supported Julian Casablancas and Damon Albarn and in 2015 appeared at numerous festivals including Glastonbury Festival, Bonnaroo Festival, Latitude Festival, Roskilde Festival, Austin City Limits and Green Man Festival. In 2016 they played at Byron Bay Bluesfest and WOMADelaide in Australia and Green Man Festival and The Great Escape Festival in the UK. At the Royal Albert Hall for Later… with Jools Holland’s 25th anniversary, they played two songs with tenor saxophone player Tunday Akintan.

On August 5, 2020 Songhoy Blues announced their new album, Optimisme would be released on October 23, 2020 through Fat Possum Records. The same day they released their new single "Badala."

== Style and influences ==
According to Jane Cornwell, writing for The Australian, Songhoy Blues "are an all-stops-out guitar band. 'World music' they are not". Band member Garba Toure states,"We grew up listening to old music by the Beatles, Jimi Hendrix and John Lee Hooker. But our main diet was hip hop and R&B. We can't stay in the traditional aesthetic of our grandparents; that was another time. Besides, we love electric guitars too much". Helen Brown of the Daily Telegraph describes the band's music as "Africa-blues-rock", stating that Songhoy Blues "do owe a musical debt to Ali Farka Touré (whose songs they started out covering), but they're definitely etching out their own groove". Garba Touré is the son of Ali Farka Touré's long-time percussionist.

== Discography ==
=== Studio albums ===
- Music in Exile (2015)
- Résistance (2017)
- Optimisme (2020)
- Héritage (2025)
