= To the End (Blur song) =

1994 single by Blur

Single by Blur

from the album Parklife
- B-side: "Threadneedle Street"; "Got Yer!"
- Released: 30 May 1994
- Genre: Baroque pop; lounge-pop
- Length: 4:05 (album version); 3:52 (single version)
- Label: Food
- Composers: Damon Albarn; Graham Coxon; Alex James; Dave Rowntree
- Lyricist: Damon Albarn
- Producers: Stephen Hague; Blur; John Smith

Blur singles chronology
"Girls & Boys" (1994)	"To the End" (1994)	"Parklife" (1994)

Music video
- "To the End" on YouTube

"To the End" is a song by English rock band Blur. It appears on their third studio album, Parklife (1994), and was released as a single in May 1994 by Food Records. The song describes a couple unsuccessfully trying to overcome a bad patch in a relationship, and features full orchestral accompaniment with a choric refrain in French by Lætitia Sadier from Stereolab. The song was produced by Stephen Hague, unlike the rest of the Parklife album, which was produced by Stephen Street. Blur have produced several different recordings of the song. The accompanying music video was directed by David Mould and shot in Prague, Czech Republic.

== Release ==
=== Single ===
"To the End" was released on 30 May 1994 as the second single from Parklife. It was not one of Blur's major hits, charting only at number 16 in the UK Singles Chart, unlike the singles released before and after, which both reached the top 10.

=== French version ===
Blur also recorded a version in which Albarn sings the lead vocal in French. This was released as the third track on the 12" and CD2 editions of the "Parklife" single. This version features a relatively straightforward French translation of the lyrics and has a slightly demo-ish sound.

== To the End (La Comedie) ==
In March 1995, Blur re-recorded "To the End" at Abbey Road Studios with French singer Françoise Hardy, with verses sung in French. The recording mutated into a duet titled "To the End (La Comedie)". This recording was released as a single in France and included in the Brit Pop Box Set along with other Parklife-era singles. It was also released as a B-side to the single "Country House" and on French editions of the album The Great Escape.

== Critical reception ==
Upon the release, Ian Gittins from Melody Maker commented, "It's essentially a Bond theme — the sleeve depicts a revolver, fitted with silencer, and a red rose — meeting Adam Faith as "Budgie", and thus all about sky-high dreams, bathos and underachievement." Alan Jones from Music Week gave it a full score of five out of five and named it Pick of the Week, writing, "A surefire smash, combining Blurs most sophisticated song to date with the sought-after Pet Shop Boys remix of 'Girls & Boys'. 'To the End' is a lush orchestrated song, with an endearingly quirky vocal and masses of potential." Pan-European magazine Music & Media complimented it as "a lovely orchestrated ballad a la Walker Brothers in the '60s." Rupert Howe from NME wrote, "A musically perfect string-soaked ballad that dredges up all kinds of misty-eyed Motown memories, hooks them up with a touch of Anglo-French lyrical dalliance and might have pulled off a minor coup if it weren't for the fact that Damon never takes his tongue out of his cheek long enough to make the whole escapade entirely convincing." Andrew Harrison from Select remarked the song's "Diamonds are Forever glitz and seedy glamour". Mark Sutherland from Smash Hits named it a "sad slowie" in his review of the Parklife album.

== Music video ==
The promo video for "To the End" was directed by David Mould, produced by Jeremy Bannister and was released on 31 May 1994. It was shot in Prague, Czech Republic, in the city's National Museum and has footage from the garden of Castle Libochovice in 1994. In keeping with the song's use of French, the video is a pastiche of the classic French New Wave film Last Year at Marienbad (1961). The four-minute video imitates the cinematography and editing style of the film, and replicates numerous scenes from it. Enigmatic subtitles (not from the film) appear. The band takes the place of the characters from the film: Damon Albarn plays "X" and Graham Coxon is "M", both of whom are involved in a love triangle with a mysterious woman (Amanda Doyle). The video was released on the VHS and DVD editions of Blur: The Best of.

== Track listings ==
All music was composed by Damon Albarn, Graham Coxon, Alex James, and Dave Rowntree. All lyrics were written by Albarn.

- CD1
1. "To the End" – 3:52
2. "Threadneedle Street" – 3:19
3. "Got Yer!" – 1:48
- CD2 and 12-inch
1. "To the End" – 3:52
2. "Girls & Boys" (Pet Shop Boys 7" Mix) – 4:04
3. "Girls & Boys" (Pet Shop Boys 12" Mix) – 7:16
- Cassette
1. "To the End" – 3:52
2. "Girls & Boys" (Pet Shop Boys 7" Mix) – 4:04
3. "Threadneedle Street" – 3:19
- CD – Blur et Françoise Hardy – "To the End (La Comedie)" (1995)
1. "To the End (La Comedie)" – 5:03
2. "To the End (La Comedie)" (Instrumental) – 5:03

== Personnel ==
Blur

- Damon Albarn – vocals, synthesizers, vibraphone
- Graham Coxon – clarinet, electric guitar
- Alex James – bass guitar
- Dave Rowntree – drums

Additional performers

- Lætitia Sadier – vocals
- Stephen Hague – accordion
- String quartet
  - Chris Tombling
  - Audrey Riley
  - Leo Payne MBE
  - Chris Pitsillides
- Françoise Hardy – vocals (La Comedie)

== Charts ==
=== Weekly charts ===
Chart (1994)	Peak position
Australia (ARIA)	198
Europe (Eurochart Hot 100)	54
Israel (Israeli Singles Chart)	1
Scottish Singles Sales (Official Charts)	34
UK Singles (Official Charts)	16
UK Airplay (Music Week)	24

=== Year-end charts ===
Chart (1994)	Position
Israel (Israeli Singles Chart)	25
UK Singles (OCC)	180

== Release history ==
Region	Date	Format(s)	Label(s)	Ref.
United Kingdom	30 May 1994	12-inch vinyl; CD1; cassette	Food	
United Kingdom	6 June 1994	CD2	Food	
Australia	22 August 1994	CD1; cassette	Food	
Australia	19 September 1994	CD2	Food	
