= Africa Express (organization) =

Musical collaboration non-profit organization

Africa Express is a UK-based non-profit organization that facilitates cross-cultural collaborations between musicians in African, Middle Eastern, and Western countries. It seeks to help African musicians break beyond the perceived stigmas and prejudices of the term world music, while presenting a positive impression of Africa to counter common media images of war, famine, and disease. Notable events that Africa Express has been involved in include performances at the 2012 Olympics, the Glastonbury Festival, the BBC Electric Proms, Denmark's Roskilde Festival, a tour of Syrian refugee musicians, and concerts in such places as Mali, the Congo, Ethiopia, Nigeria, South Africa, and France.

The organization has also released a number of compilations and collaborative albums along with a documentary about the 2012 Africa Express UK train tour. Many of the established Western musicians who have participated in the organization's projects have spoken of their admiration for the musical skill of the African musicians involved and the influence their participation has had on them. Over 50,000 people are estimated to have attended Africa Express events, which have received substantial global media coverage.

== History ==
Africa Express began out of a 2005 gathering in a Covent Garden bar where Blur and Gorillaz frontman Damon Albarn along with other musicians and music industry friends were angered by the Live 8 charity concert for Africa's inclusion of only one African artist in its line up. Co-founding the organization with the journalist Ian Birrell, Africa Express's inaugural project featured Albarn and Birrell taking a number of Western musicians including Fatboy Slim, Martha Wainwright, and Jamie T, to perform at Festival au Désert in the Sahara outside of Timbuktu. In the early years of Africa Express, shows would be put on semi-spontaneously in locations such as Brixton pubs, with little to no advance announcement. The spirit of spontaneous collaborations between musicians of diverse cultures has carried on as the organization has grown to stage large scale events.

In addition to Damon Albarn, frequent contributors to Africa Express's varied projects include Fela Kuti's drummer Tony Allen from Nigeria, Senegalese singer/guitarist Baaba Maal, the Malian duo Amadou & Mariam, the Yeah Yeah Yeahs' Nick Zinner, and The Magic Numbers' Romeo Stodart. Western musicians who've performed in the organizations events include Paul McCartney, Led Zeppelin's John Paul Jones, Brian Eno, Flea of the Red Hot Chili Peppers, Scratch of The Roots, De La Soul, the Super Furry Animals' Gruff Rhys, Paul Weller, Martha Wainwright, Fatboy Slim, 3D of Massive Attack, The Smiths' Johnny Marr, Mick Jones and Paul Simonon of The Clash, Peter Hook of New Order/Joy Division, Terry Hall and Lynval Golding of The Specials, Carl Barat of The Libertines, Chicago's Hypnotic Brass Ensemble, Franz Ferdinand, Bjork, Elvis Costello, Django Django's David Maclean, Ghostpoet, Julia Holter, and numerous others.

Alongside Tony Allen, Baaba Maal, and Amadou & Mariam, other African acts who have taken part in Africa Express projects include Nigerian Afrobeat star Femi Kuti, Algerian-French singer/activist Rachid Taha, Saharan blues group Tinariwen, Somali-Canadian rapper K'Naan, Malian acts such as singer/songwriter Rokia Traoré, singer Fatoumata Diawara, kora player Toumani Diabaté, Bassekou Kouyate, afro-pop artist Salif Keita, singer Oumou Sangaré, and the desert blues duo Songhoy Blues from Timbuktu, Senegal's Wasis Diop and rap duo Daara J, the Mauritanian griot Noura Mint Seymali, the Congo's Jupiter Bokondji, and many more.

In 2013, as a response to extremists banning music in the north of Mali, Albarn, Eno and others went to the country to collaborate and record with local musicians, with profits from the resultant Maison Des Jeunes album to be used to build a studio in Bamako. The group Songhoy Blues from Timbuktu were found living in a one room shack in Bamako during the trip and the release subsequently launched an international career for the act.

In addition to expanding the Western audience for African music, Africa Express projects have also influenced the artistic output of the musicians taking part. The Red Hot Chili Peppers 2011 song Ethiopia was based on their member Flea's experiences in Ethiopia with Africa Express. Brian Eno, Django Django's David Maclean, and Franz Ferdinand's Alex Kapranos have also spoken of artistic outcomes arising from their involvement.

In 2018 UK-based musician Nabihah Iqbal shared her contract publicly after working on an Africa Express project in South Africa. The artist complained that the contract saw all recording royalties raised from their work going to the organization with no future record royalties to be paid out to them. Africa Express responded by explaining that on their projects, all travel, food, and accommodation costs are covered for the Western acts involved, who in turn are asked to donate their time and potential recording royalties arising from the completed work and that their contracts are negotiable. They state that the African artists involved are under different contracts where they are paid for their time, and that any profits arising go back into the artists and the promotion of African music.

Africa Express Limited is registered at Companies House in the UK with the directors listed as Ian Birrell, Remi Kabaka Jr. (aka Russel Hobbs of Gorillaz), Lauren Roth de Wolf, Jason Walsh and Robin Aitken.

== Events ==
Some of the organizations notable events include:

- 2006 – Festival au Désert, Mali: Damon Albarn, Fatboy Slim, Martha Wainwright, Jamie T, and others performed at the Tuareg's Festival au Désert in the Sahara, near Timbuktu.
- 2007 – Glastonbury: The organization put on a five-hour semi-spontaneous show at the Glastonbury Festival featuring collaborations between British and African artists such as Billy Bragg, Fatboy Slim, The Magic Numbers, K'naan, Baaba Maal, and Tinariwen.
- 2008 – Kinshasa, The Congo: A club show was put on in Kinshasa with a number of notable UK and African musicians such as Massive Attack's Robert Del Naja, Damon Albarn and Tony Allen improvising with members of local group Staff Benda Bilili who were formed from homeless and disabled polio victims living on the Kinshasa Zoo grounds.
- 2008 – Lagos, Nigeria: Held as part of 'Felabration' celebrating the works of Afrobeat legend Fela Kuti, an Africa Express concert for 10,000 was put on at the New Afrika Shrine (a revival of Fela Kuti's Shrine club).
- 2008 – London, BBC Electric Proms: At Camden's Koko, an Africa Express event with over 130 musicians was held as part of the BBC Electric Proms, with a BBC Radio 1 live broadcast of the concert happening including performances by African Express regulars and Malian singer Oumou Sangaré, Senegalese rap duo Daara J, Algerian singer & activist Rachid Taha, The Magic Numbers' Romeo Stodart, the Red Hot Chili Peppers' Flea, and The Smiths' Johnny Marr amongst others.
- 2008 – Liverpool, The Olympia: In a one time variety and dance hall, Africa Express regulars performed along with members of Franz Ferdinand, Hard-Fi, Turin Brakes, Senegal's Wasis Diop, Mali's Bassekou Kouyate and London rapper Kano.
- 2009 – Paris, Place de l'Hôtel de Ville: A five-hour free outdoor show for 15,000 people was held in front of Paris's townhall, featuring such acts as Malian singer Oumou Sangaré, Morocco's Hindi Zahra, the Super Furry Animals' Gruff Rhys, The Kooks, and Corinne Bailey Rae.
- 2010 – Addis Ababa & Harar, Ethiopia: Performers on Africa Express's trip to Ethiopia included the Red Hot Chili Peppers' bassist Flea, the Yeah Yeah Yeahs Nick Zinner, Kano, Franz Ferdinand's Alex Kapranos, and others.
- 2012 – UK, Cultural Olympiad: As an aspect of the Cultural Olympiad tied to the London 2012 Olympic Games, a converted 1970s diesel train went around the UK for a week with 80 acts living and performing on it, including Baaba Maal, Amadou & Mariam, Tony Allen, the Yeah Yeah Yeahs' Nick Zinner, and others. Acts disembarked in various towns to play 'pop up concerts' in locations such as prisons, factories, and schools culminating in a concert behind London's King's Cross station that saw Paul McCartney and Led Zeppelin's John Paul Jones collaborating live with the African musicians.
- 2013 – Marseille, Dock Des Suds: In an outdoor space in the city's portlands, such artists as the Congo's Jupiter Bokondji, Malian singer Fatoumata Diawara, French rock performer Matthieu Chedid, and the UK's Kasabian, joined Africa Express's regular performers as the climax of Marseille's annual Fiesta des Suds.
- 2015 – Roskilde Festival, Denmark: A five-hour set of African Express musicians culminated in Albarn being carried off stage by stage manager David Preston after exceeding the allotted timeslot.
- 2016 – The Orchestra of Syrian Musicians tour: Members of Syria's national orchestra were reunited for a European tour and a subsequent live album that saw refugee musicians rejoined with others who were flown in from Syria on a chartered 737.
- 2018 – Johannesburg, South Africa: Western and local musicians created an album in South Africa, with their week of work culminating in a performance at Johannesburg's Tennis Club.
- 2019 – Waltham Forest, UK: A gathering centred on a big top circus tent in a forest near Leytonstone, East London, featuring performances from Damon Albarn, Django Django, Ellie Rowsell (Wolf Alice), Gruff Rhys, Imarhan, Joan As Police Woman, Mista Silva, Moonchild Sanelly, Muzi, Rokia Traoré, Sibot, and The Good, the Bad & the Queen.

== Discography ==
- Africa Express Presents... (2009)
- Africa Express Presents: Maison Des Jeunes (2013)
- Africa Express Presents: Terry Riley in C Mali (2014)
- Africa Express Presents: The Orchestra of Syrian Musicians (2016)
- Africa Express Presents: Molo (2019)
- Egoli (2019)
- Africa Express Presents... Bahidorá (2025)

== Filmography ==
- Africa Express – The Story So Far (2009)
- The Africa Express (2013)
- Africa Express Presents EGOLI (Documentary)(2021)
