= Africa Express Presents... Terry Riley's In C Mali =

2014 classical recording

Studio album by Africa Express
- Released: 24 November 2014
- Recorded: 2013 (Bamako, Mali)
- Genre: Minimalism; Mande music
- Label: Transgressive

Damon Albarn solo chronology
Live at the De De De Der (2014)	Terry Riley's In C Mali (2014)	The Magic Whip (2015)

Africa Express Presents... Terry Riley's In C Mali is a studio album released by Africa Express, a UK-based non-profit organisation. The album is a recording of Terry Riley's minimalist composition In C, with playing from Malian and Western musicians. It was released through Transgressive Records on 24 November 2014.

== Background and music ==
In C is a classical piece in the style of minimalism, composed by Terry Riley in 1964 for any number of performers though he recommends about 20 to 30 as ideal. The piece begins with a steady pulse played on the note C on a piano or mallet percussion. Then, the performers play a series 53 of short melodic segments, each of which they repeat for as many times as they choose before moving on to the next segment.

This process causes the phrases to overlap and interfere aleatorically, creating complex harmony and rhythms as musicians progress through the 53 segments at different times. Though each performance of In C uses the same sheet music and instructions, each performance is also very different from other interpretations due to instruments used and the latitude given to musicians. The composition was inspired by modal jazz and the repetition found in African music.

There have been many recordings of In C since the first in 1968, but In C Mali is the by African performers and prominently using African instruments. In C Mali was first initiated by the German conductor André de Ridder. It was recorded in Bamako, Mali, in 2013. The album was released in 2014, the fiftieth anniversary of In C's composition. It was released physically via Transgressive Records in 2015. Africa Express' rendition runs for 41 minutes. It keeps the same key elements of the original, but adds extra details, for example, flutes, strings, and a spoken word soliloquy (during which, the pulse stops). 17 musicians play on the album, consisting of both Malian and Western musicians (including Damon Albarn, Nick Zinner, and Brian Eno). The pulse is played on the balafon. Ridder served as the conductor.

== Reception ==
Paul Mardles of The Guardian gave the album four out of five stars, and praised the "new details" that give the recording its charm. Joe Tangari of Pitchfork rated the album 8.1 out of 10 points, praising its distinction from other In C recordings, and the ensemble's "dynamic interplay". The album received three-and-a-half out of five stars from Andy Beta of Rolling Stone. Mark Kidel of The Arts Desk gave the recording a perfect score, and wrote it may be the most "exciting version" of In C.

== Personnel ==
Adapted from Tangari 2015.

- Adama Koita – kamel n’goni
- Alou Coulibaly – percussion
- Andi Toma – percussion
- André de Ridder – multi-instrumentalist, conductor
- Badou Mbaye – percussion
- Bijou – vocals
- Brian Eno – vocals
- Cheick Diallo – flute
- Damon Albarn – melodica
- Defily Sako – kora
- Guindo Sala – imzad
- Jeff Wootton – guitar
- Kalifa Koné – balafon
- Modibo Diawara – kora
- Mémé Koné – balafon
- Nick Zinner – guitar
- Olugbenga – vocals
