= End of a Century =

1994 single by Blur

Single by Blur

from the album Parklife
- B-side: "Red Necks"; "Alex's Song"
- Released: 7 November 1994
- Genre: Britpop
- Length: 2:46
- Label: Parlophone; Food
- Composers: Damon Albarn; Graham Coxon; Alex James; Dave Rowntree
- Lyricist: Damon Albarn
- Producer: Stephen Street

Blur singles chronology
"Parklife" (1994)	"End of a Century" (1994)	"Country House" (1995)

Music video
- "End of a Century" on YouTube

"End of a Century" is a song by English rock band Blur. Released in November 1994 by Food Records, it was the last single to be released from their third album, Parklife (1994). The song was written by the band and produced by Stephen Street, reaching number 19 on the UK Singles Chart. It was considered a disappointment by Andy Ross of Food. Damon Albarn later stated that "End of a Century" may not have been the best choice for the album's fourth single, and that "This Is a Low" would have been a better alternative.

== Lyrical content ==
Damon Albarn stated that the song is about "how couples get into staying in and staring at each other. Only instead of candle-light, it's the TV light." The opening line, "she said there's ants in the carpet", refers to an infestation of ants that Albarn and his then-girlfriend Justine Frischmann suffered in their then-home in Kensington. The lyrics seem to emphasise the then upcoming millennium change and the fact that people contemplate the future rather than take care of the present. Producer Stephen Street saw the song as "Damon getting the art of songwriting really sorted".

== Critical reception ==
Terry Staunton from Melody Maker wrote, "The fourth gem from Parklife in this, the year of the Blur. Forging the best bits of mid-era Beatles with wry Ray Davies observation, this has more charm than a lorryload of Lucy Claytons and should sound fantastic on the radio." Pan-European magazine Music & Media noted, "In a fin-de-siècle mood Blur re-evaluates the roaring '60s with a great pop song that's a cross between Kinks and Small Faces-type of directness and Syd Barrett's cleverness." In a separate review, "End of a Century" was also described as "'60s psychedelic pop with a touch of Syd Barrett".

Martin Aston from Music Week gave it a score of four out of five in his review of the single. Andrew Harrison from Select said it "clambers over its ugly cousin to sum up Blur's amiable cynicism with a mournful trumpet and perhaps the most eloquent lines Damon's yet written: 'Another country?(sic)/It's nothing special.'" Pete Stanton from Smash Hits gave it a full score of five out of five and named it Best New Single, writing, "'End of the Century' is the fourth tune off Parklife, and has their usual ingredients: switly start, sweet guitars, cockney vocals, big ending. I'm reaching for my old mod clobber right now."

== Music video ==
The accompanying music video for "End of a Century" is a live performance recorded at Alexandra Palace. As with their later video to "Tender", it uses the audio track of the live performance, rather than overdubbing the audio of the studio take.

== Track listings ==
- 7-inch and cassette single
1. "End of a Century" (Albarn, Coxon, James and Rowntree; lyrics by Albarn) – 2:47
2. "Red Necks" (Albarn, Coxon, James, Rowntree; lyrics by Coxon) – 3:04
- CD and mini-CD single
1. "End of a Century" (Albarn, Coxon, James, Rowntree; lyrics by Albarn) – 2:47
2. "Red Necks" (Albarn, Coxon, James, Rowntree; lyrics by Coxon) – 3:04
3. "Alex's Song" (James) – 2:42

== Personnel ==
Blur

- Damon Albarn – lead vocals, Hammond organ
- Graham Coxon – acoustic and electric guitars, clarinet, backing vocals
- Alex James – bass guitar
- Dave Rowntree – drums

Kick Horns

- Richard Edwards – trombone
- Roddy Lorimer – flugelhorn

== Charts ==
=== Weekly charts ===
Chart (1994–1995)	Peak position
Belgium (Ultratop 50 Flanders)	49
Europe (Eurochart Hot 100)	69
Iceland (Íslenski Listinn Topp 40)	2
Israel (Israeli Singles Chart)	32
Scottish Singles Sales (Official Charts)	18
UK Singles (Official Charts)	19

=== Year-end charts ===
Chart (1995)	Position
Iceland (Íslenski Listinn Topp 40)	29

== Release history ==
Region	Date	Format(s)	Label(s)	Ref.
United Kingdom	7 November 1994	7-inch vinyl; CD; cassette	Parlophone; Food	
Japan	21 December 1994	Mini-CD	EMI; Food	
Australia	27 February 1995	CD; cassette	Food	
