= Country House (Blur song) =

1995 single by Blur

- CD single cover

Single by Blur

from the album The Great Escape
- B-side: "One Born Every Minute"
- Released: 14 August 1995
- Genre: Britpop
- Length: 3:57
- Label: Food; Parlophone
- Composers: Damon Albarn; Graham Coxon; Alex James; Dave Rowntree
- Lyricist: Damon Albarn
- Producer: Stephen Street

Blur singles chronology
| "End of a Century" (1994) | "Country House" (1995) | "The Universal" (1995) |

Music video
- "Country House" on YouTube

"Country House" is a song by English rock band Blur. It was released as the lead single from the band's fourth studio album, The Great Escape (1995), on 14 August 1995 by Food Records and Parlophone. Released on the same day as the Oasis single "Roll with It" – in a chart battle dubbed the "Battle of Britpop" – "Country House" reached number one in the UK Singles Chart (the first of two Blur singles to reach number one, the second being 1997's "Beetlebum"). The song is the band's best-selling single, with over 540,000 copies sold as of May 2014. Music magazines Music & Media and NME named it Single of the Week. The accompanying music video was directed by Damien Hirst and nominated for Best Video in the 1996 BRIT Awards.

== Background and writing ==
In an interview for The South Bank Show, Damon Albarn explained that the song was inspired by former Blur manager Dave Balfe, who left Blur's label Food Records and bought a house in the country. Balfe moved to The Bury in 1994 at Church End, Barton-le-Clay in southern Bedfordshire off the A6. The house had four acres of land, nine bedrooms with five en-suite. He moved with his wife Helen and their children aged 2 and 4, when he was 36. The house was advertised in 2015 for £2 million. It was Grade II listed in February 1975.

== Content ==
The song is about a man who retires to an expensive country house to escape the pressures of the city. The cover art features a horizontally-flipped image of Neuschwanstein Castle in Bavaria.

== Release and "battle" with Oasis ==
"Country House" received a great deal of media attention when Blur's label Food Records moved the original release date to the same day as Oasis's "Roll with It". The British media had already reported an intense rivalry between the two bands and this clash of releases was seen as a battle for the number one spot, dubbed the "Battle of Britpop". In the end, "Country House" won the "battle", attaining the No. 1 spot while "Roll with It" came in at No. 2. Albarn himself was surprised that "Country House" topped the charts. He told NME, "I sort of believed all the papers, including NME, who told me Oasis were going to win."

== Critical reception ==
David Stubbs from Melody Maker felt the song "sounds at first to be taunting us with that old Britpop standard, um, thingummy, the one that goes Our house is a very, very, very nice house/With two cats in the yard.. but turns out to be a cynical account of the miserable fat-rat city achiever attempting to find solace in the big rural pile of his dreams — a seemingly chirpy but ultimately very unsettling vignette hinting at Blur's darker edges." Pan-European magazine Music & Media named it Single of the Week, adding, "Everything about this song makes you think of Mott the Hoople's laddish version of David Bowie's 'All the Young Dudes'. Whatever, it has won them the UK championship at the expense of Oasis." Also Mark Sutherland from NME named it Single of the Week, writing, "Yup, Blur's first new material since the epoch-shaping Parklife LP is nothing short of a classic pop single. In the space of the time-honoured three-and-a-bit minutes, it manages to recall everyone from Madness to The Beatles to, um, Chas and Dave, craft the most infectious chorus of modern times and still squeeze in the astonishing line He's reading Balzac, knocking back Prozac before tea-time. And you can't really ask for much more than that." Another NME editor, Johnny Cigarettes, described it as "feisty, upbeat singalong pop". Smash Hits gave 'Country House' a full score of five out of five, praising it as "a classic pop tune."

== Music video ==
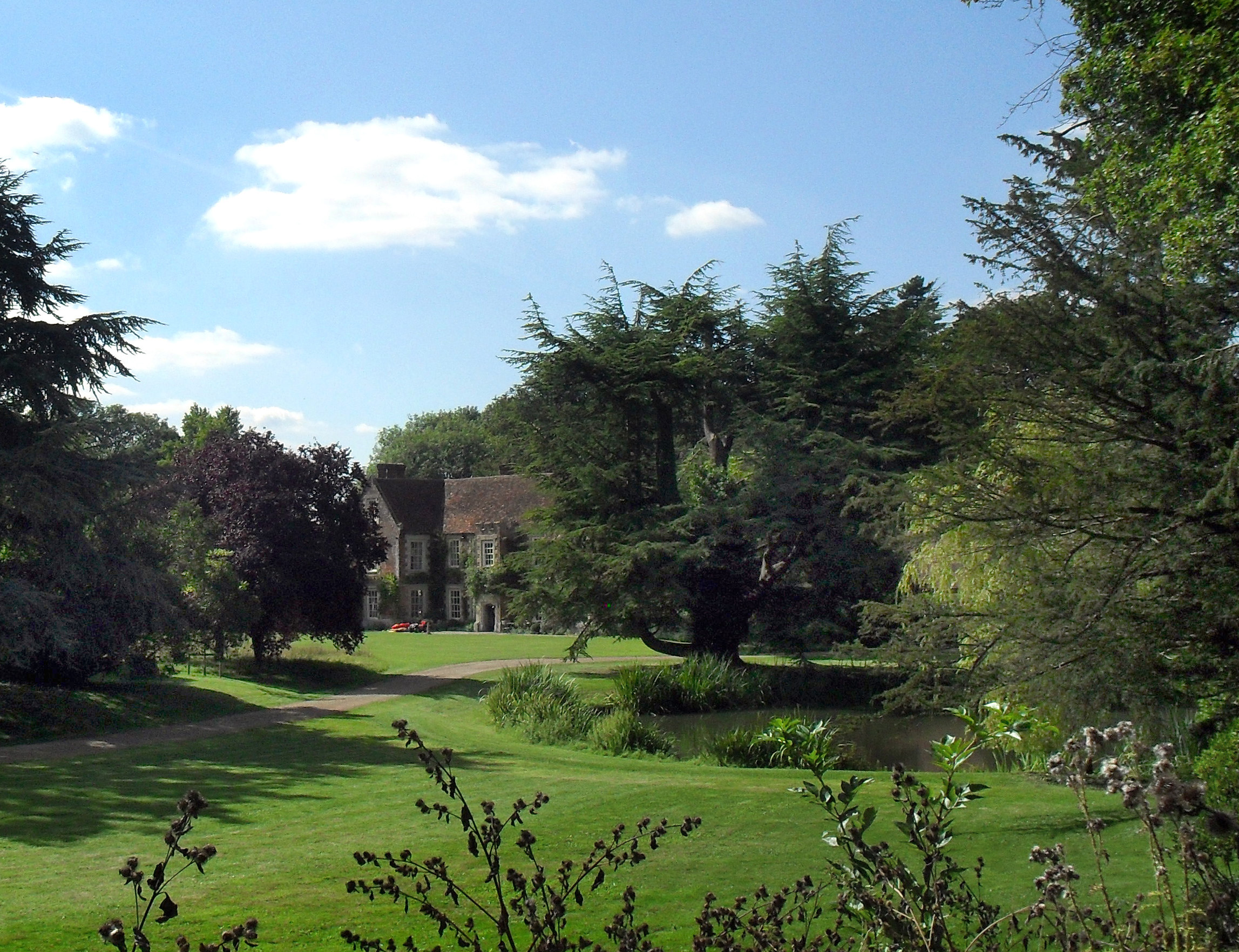
Pyrton Manor in Oxfordshire, the setting for external shots in the music video

The music video for "Country House" was directed by English artist and art collector Damien Hirst, who had attended Goldsmiths, University of London, with members of Blur. It features the band and a businessman (played by Keith Allen) in a flat with the band playing a board game called "Escape from the Rat Race" before they become trapped in the game where they are with farm animals and other people before appearing in the flat again. The band appears in the video alongside British comic actor Matt Lucas and models Sara Stockbridge, Jo Guest and Vanessa Upton. It features pastiches of—or tributes to—Benny Hill (Lucas' doctor chasing scantily clad young women culminating in the entry of the milk van of Ernie (The Fastest Milkman in the West)) and Queen's 1975 video for "Bohemian Rhapsody". It was nominated for British Video of the Year at the 1996 BRIT Awards.

The external shots of the video are at Pyrton Manor, Pyrton, in east Oxfordshire, west of junction 6 of the M40, near the B4009 and Watlington. It is now home of Vogue writer Laura Bailey, and is the former home of the 1956 High Sheriff of Oxfordshire. It is Elizabethan, built around the start of the 17th century.

== Track listings ==
All music was composed by Albarn, Coxon, James and Rowntree. All lyrics were written by Albarn.

- UK CD1 and Australian CD single
1. "Country House" – 3:58
2. "One Born Every Minute" – 2:18
3. "To the End" (with Françoise Hardy) – 5:06
- UK CD2
1. "Country House" – 5:01
2. "Girls & Boys" – 5:08
3. "Parklife" – 4:13
4. "For Tomorrow" – 7:35

Note: All tracks were recorded live at the Mile End Stadium in London, England, on 17 June 1995

- UK 7-inch and cassette single; European CD single
1. "Country House" – 3:58
2. "One Born Every Minute" – 2:18
- Japanese CD single
1. "Country House" – 3:58
2. "One Born Every Minute" – 2:18
3. "To the End" (with Françoise Hardy) – 5:06
4. "Charmless Man" – 3:44

== Production credits ==
- "Country House" and "Charmless Man" produced by Stephen Street
- "One Born Every Minute" produced by Blur and John Smith
- "To the End (la comedie)" produced by Stephen Hague, Blur and John Smith
- Damon Albarn: Lead vocals, keyboards, organ
- Graham Coxon: Guitar, saxophone, backing vocals
- Alex James: Bass guitar, backing vocals
- Dave Rowntree: Drums, percussion, backing vocals
- Additional brass by: The Kick Horns

== Charts ==
=== Weekly charts ===
| Chart (1995) | Peak position |
|---|---|
| Australia (ARIA) | 28 |
| Denmark (Tracklisten) | 7 |
| Europe (Eurochart Hot 100) | 5 |
| Europe (European Hit Radio) | 6 |
| Finland (Suomen virallinen lista) | 4 |
| Iceland (Íslenski Listinn Topp 40) | 1 |
| Ireland (IRMA) | 1 |
| Israel (IBA) | 7 |
| Italy Airplay (Music & Media) | 7 |
| Netherlands (Dutch Top 40 Tipparade) | 14 |
| Netherlands (Single Top 100 Tipparade) | 10 |
| New Zealand (Recorded Music NZ) | 30 |
| Norway (VG-lista) | 6 |
| Scottish Singles Sales (Official Charts) | 1 |
| Sweden (Sverigetopplistan) | 10 |
| Switzerland (Schweizer Hitparade) | 26 |
| UK Singles (Official Charts) | 1 |
| UK Airplay (Music Week) | 3 |

=== Year-end charts ===
| Chart (1995) | Position |
|---|---|
| Europe (Eurochart Hot 100) | 65 |
| Europe (European Hit Radio) | 28 |
| Iceland (Íslenski Listinn Topp 40) | 3 |
| Israel (IBA) | 26 |
| Sweden (Topplistan) | 74 |
| UK Singles (OCC) | 12 |
| UK Airplay (Music Week) | 23 |

== Certifications ==
| Region | Certification | Certified units/sales |
|---|---|---|
| Norway (IFPI Norway) | Gold | |
| United Kingdom (BPI) | Platinum | 600,000^{‡} |
^{‡} Sales+streaming figures based on certification alone.

== Release history ==
| Region | Date | Format(s) | Label(s) | Ref. |
|---|---|---|---|---|
| United Kingdom | 14 August 1995 | CD; cassette | Food; Parlophone | |
| Japan | 6 September 1995 | CD | EMI; Food | |
| Australia | 11 September 1995 | CD | Food; Parlophone | |
| United States | 18 September 1995 | Alternative radio | Virgin | |

== Cover versions ==
The song was covered by the Wurzels on their 2002 album Never Mind the Bullocks, 'Ere is The Wurzels and Out of the Blue on their 2005 album Freefall.
