= Parklife (song) =

1994 single by Blur

Single by Blur starring Phil Daniels

from the album Parklife
- B-side: "Supa Shoppa"; "Theme from an Imaginary Film"; "Beard"
- Released: 22 August 1994
- Genre: Britpop; post-punk
- Length: 3:05
- Label: Food; Parlophone
- Composers: Damon Albarn; Graham Coxon; Alex James; Dave Rowntree
- Lyricist: Damon Albarn
- Producer: Stephen Street

Blur singles chronology
"To the End" (1994)	"Parklife" (1994)	"End of a Century" (1994)

Music video
- "Parklife" on YouTube

"Parklife" is a song by the English rock band Blur, released on 22 August 1994 by Food and Parlophone as the third single from the band's third studio album, Parklife (1994). The song is written by the band and produced by them with Stephen Street and John Smith. It contains spoken-word verses by English actor and singer Phil Daniels, who also appears in the accompanying music video, which was directed by Pedro Romhanyi. "Parklife" reached No. 10 on the UK Singles Chart and No. 30 in Ireland. It won British Single of the Year and British Video of the Year at the 1995 Brit Awards, and was also performed at the 2012 Brit Awards. The Massed Bands of the Household Division performed "Parklife" at the London 2012 Olympics closing ceremony. The song is considered one of the defining tracks of Britpop, and it features on the 2003 compilation album Live Forever: The Rise and Fall of Brit Pop.

== Background ==
According to Graham Coxon, the song was sarcastic, rather than a celebration of Englishness. He explained the song "wasn't about the working class, it was about the park class: dustbin men, pigeons, joggers – things we saw every day on the way to the studio [Maison Rouge in Fulham]" and that it was about "having fun and doing exactly what you want to do".

Phil Daniels had been approached to recite a poem for "The Debt Collector", but Damon Albarn could not find a poem he liked and made the song into an instrumental. Daniels was asked to sing lead vocals on "Parklife" instead. He reinvigorated the band, who had grown tired of working on the track. Daniels was unfamiliar with the band, but after talking to Albarn he accepted the job. The recording in the studio took about forty minutes. Daniels opted for a cut of the royalties rather than being paid upfront. Daniels said of the song, "You never knew exactly what the song was about, and I still don't, which is part of the magic of it."

Despite what is commonly believed, the song does not refer to Castle Park in Colchester, the town where the band hail from. According to Albarn when introducing the song during their July 2009 Hyde Park performance, "I came up with the idea for this song in this park. I was living on Kensington Church Street, and I used to come into the park at the other end, and I used to, you know, watch people, and pigeons...", at which moment Daniels appears onstage. Daniels also performed a rendition of the song at the band's headline slot at Glastonbury Festival 2009 and at the band's second Hyde Park concert in August 2012, at the 2012 Brit Awards, and at both of the band's concerts at Wembley Stadium in July 2023, where he emerged from a tent brought onstage for the preceding song, "Country House".

A number of newspaper articles about the young middle classes' adoption of Estuary English appeared during the single's chart run, including one in The Sunday Times on the day the song entered the singles chart (although Daniels's accent is more obviously cockney).

The song played a part in Blur's supposed feud with fellow Britpop band Oasis at the 1996 Brit Awards when the Gallagher brothers, Liam and Noel, taunted Blur by singing a drunk rendition of "Parklife", mimicking Albarn's accent (with Liam changing the lyrics to "Shite-life" and Noel shouting "Marmite"), when the members of Oasis were collecting the "Best British Album" award, which both bands had been nominated for.

== Reception ==
Larry Flick of Billboard magazine wrote, "Blur continues to explore its newfound interest in shameless pop, first exploited on the giddy, 'New-Romantic'-sounding 'Girls & Boys'. This follow-up is pure fun, as the British act pounces through bouncy melodies, woven through playful guitars and spoken-word vocals." Chuck Campbell from Knoxville News Sentinel named it a "good song" and "wry British pop", remarking that it features "a chatty performance" by actor Phil Daniels. Holly Barringer from Melody Maker said, "Almost unbearably catchy. 'Alfie' in aural form." Martin Aston from Music Week gave "Parklife" four out of five, opining that it "is not the most obvious of choices for a single". He complimented its "superbly catchy chorus [that] does the trick anyway". Pan-European magazine Music & Media commented, "Old men on the park bench will have to move over a little bit to make room for these punky brats commenting on life around the pool. It's as nurturing for the ducks as it is for you." In their review of Parklife, they added, "You'll have fun with their daily life observations from the park bench on the title track, a cross between Small Faces' daftness and the Fall's biting tongue." Johnny Cigarettes from NME wrote, "Totally ridiculous and brilliant, as you probably know by now. Easily irritating for humourless people-haters because it prefers to embrace the commonplace with affection rather than superficial romantic headtrips." Mark Sutherland awarded the song "Best New Single" in the 17 August issue of Smash Hits, calling it "superb," and "one of the barmiest pop songs ever." In May 2007, NME magazine placed "Parklife" at number 41 in its list of the 50 Greatest Indie Anthems Ever.

"Parklife" is the best-selling single from the album, with 190,000 copies sold. The Kinks' Ray Davies spoke glowingly of the song, calling it "maybe their best song, and certainly their best record" and stating, "One of my fondest times with Damon is a poetry festival at the Albert Hall. He sang one of my songs and I sang 'Parklife'. Then I understood the similarities between The Kinks and Blur. It's in the way I change chords, and sing stylistically."

== Music video ==
The song's music video was directed by Pedro Romhanyi and produced by Steven Elliott for Oil Factory. It was released on 22 August 1994 and filmed next to The Pilot pub on the Greenwich Peninsula. The video features Phil Daniels as a smarmy double glazing salesman (a homage to Tin Men), with Damon Albarn as his assistant, driving around in a 1970s Ford Granada Mk1 Coupe. Other band members appear as various characters from the song, including Dave Rowntree and Alex James as a couple, with the latter in drag. At one point, Albarn is impressed to see a man (Graham Coxon) carrying a placard reading "Modern Life Is Rubbish", the title of Blur's previous album; on the reverse is written "End of a Century", the title of their subsequent single from Parklife. "Parklife" was later made available on Blur's official YouTube in 2015, restored in full colour 4K, having generated more than 18 million views as of early 2025.

The video was featured in the 1995 episode "Lightning Strikes" (episode 21 of Season 5) of Beavis and Butt-Head. The characters stated Daniels bore a resemblance to Family Feud host Richard Dawson.

== B-sides ==
Blur provided the single with a selection of strikingly contrasting B-sides, all pastiches of other genres of music. One of a number of occasional Blur songs written in waltz time and built on an arrangement of harpsichord, piano and string synths, Theme from an Imaginary Film was planned but rejected for the film Decadence. Supa Shoppa was an instrumental in the style of acid jazz, recorded with percussion, synth flute and Hammond organ parts. Drowned in Sound, reviewing Blur's career, noted that it had been a "perfect live opener for the Parklife tour when cranked up." Beard also parodied jazz music, and was named based on the stereotype of jazz fans wearing them. An additional alternative version of "To the End" was also added.

== Football ==
The song started to be played at football matches in the mid-1990s, later becoming a "football anthem" and featuring on albums like The Best Footie Anthems in the World...Ever! and The Beautiful Game, the Official Album of Euro 1996.

Nike aired a television advertisement in 1997 called Parklife. The advertisement featured the song and Premier League footballers including Eric Cantona, Ian Wright and Robbie Fowler. The advert received acclaim and later was rated the 14th best advert of all time by ITV in 2005, and as the 15th best by Channel 4 in 2000.

The song is played before the home matches of Chelsea F.C. at Stamford Bridge. The song's narrator Phil Daniels and Blur frontman Damon Albarn are both fans of Chelsea.

== Track listings ==
All music was composed by Albarn, Coxon, James and Rowntree. All lyrics were written by Albarn.

- UK CD1 and cassette single
1. "Parklife" – 3:06
2. "Supa Shoppa" – 3:02
3. "Theme from an Imaginary Film" – 3:34
- UK CD2 and Australian CD single
1. "Parklife" – 3:06
2. "Beard" – 1:45
3. "To the End" (French version) – 4:06
- UK 12-inch single

A1. "Parklife" – 3:06
A2. "Supa Shoppa" – 3:02
B1. "To the End" (French version) – 4:06
B2. "Beard" – 1:45

- European CD single
1. "Parklife" – 3:06
2. "Beard" – 1:45
- French CD single
1. "Parklife" (single version) – 3:07
2. "Popscene" – 3:12
3. "To the End" (version française) – 4:05
4. "Supa Shoppa" – 3:03

== Personnel ==
=== Blur ===
- Damon Albarn – lead and backing vocals, piano, Hammond organ
- Graham Coxon – electric guitars, saxophone, backing vocals
- Alex James – bass guitar
- Dave Rowntree – drums

=== Additional musician ===
- Phil Daniels – narration

== Charts ==
=== Weekly charts ===
Chart (1994)	Peak position
Australia (ARIA)	119
Europe (Eurochart Hot 100)	37
Ireland (IRMA)	30
Israel (IBA)	28
Scottish Singles Sales (Official Charts)	7
UK Singles (Official Charts)	10
UK Airplay (Music Week)	16

=== Year-end charts ===
Chart (1994)	Position
UK Singles (OCC)	121

== Certifications ==
Region	Certification	Certified units/sales
New Zealand (RMNZ)	Gold	15,000^{‡}
United Kingdom (BPI)	2× Platinum	1,200,000^{‡}
^{‡} Sales+streaming figures based on certification alone.

== Release history ==
Region	Date	Format(s)	Label(s)	Ref(s).
United Kingdom	22 August 1994	12-inch vinyl; CD; cassette	Food; Parlophone	
Australia	14 November 1994	CD; cassette	Food; Parlophone	
