= This Is a Low =

Promotional single by Blur

from the album Parklife
- Released: 3 January 1995
- Recorded: August 1993–January 1994
- Genre: Britpop
- Length: 5:07 (album version); 5:02 (Blur: The Best Of version)
- Label: Food
- Composers: Damon Albarn, Graham Coxon, Alex James and Dave Rowntree
- Lyricist: Damon Albarn
- Producer: Stephen Street

Official audio
- "This Is a Low" on YouTube

"This Is a Low" is a song by English rock band Blur for their third studio album, Parklife. The song was released as a promotional single in 1995.

== Background and recording ==
Originally titled "We Are the Low", the song began life as an instrumental during the Parklife sessions. In the guitar solo, Graham Coxon played three solos, including one of him sitting in front of his amp, turned up to maximum volume. According to bassist Alex James, Damon Albarn was finding it hard to write lyrics. In his autobiography, A Bit of a Blur, he revealed that "for Christmas I bought him a handkerchief with a map of the shipping forecast regions on it ... you can never tell where the muse is going to appear." "We always found the shipping forecast soothing", James said. "We used to listen to it [on the American tour] to remind us of home. It's very good for a hangover. Good cure for insomnia, too." On 4 February 1994, the penultimate day of official recording, Albarn was due to go into hospital for a hernia operation. Pressured to come up with the lyrics, Albarn took advantage of the map James had given him. "I'd had this line – 'And into the sea go pretty England and me' – for a long time", Albarn revealed. "So I started at the Bay of Biscay. Back for tea. 'Tea' rhymes with 'me'. And then I went 'Hit traffic on the Dogger Bank'. 'Bank' – 'Rank' – so 'up the Thames to find a taxi rank'. And I just went round."

== Music and lyrics ==
The song is in the key of E major and is in 4/4 time. In total, the song contains two verses, two choruses, a guitar solo and two further choruses. The music commences with a four-chord guitar progression, before moving straight into the first verse. The music is based in the mixolydian mode, highlighted by the fact the V chord (B minor) is minor instead of major.

The song's lyrics reference a low-pressure area of weather hitting Britain. The lyrics are based on the Shipping Forecast, with references made to the various areas surrounding the country. In the lyric "sail on by with the tide", passing reference is also made to the tune "Sailing By", which plays at the start of the 0048 forecast on BBC Radio 4. Music writer John Harris described the lyrics as "a fantasia centred around the shipping forecast – [an] inexplicably calming institution that soundtracks the switching-off of the UK's night-lights – narrated as if the writer was gazing at the whole of The British Isles."

=== Locations named in the song ===
This is a list of the shipping areas mentioned in the song (in context):

- Bay of Biscay – "Around the Bay of Biscay and back for tea"
- Dogger, Thames – "Hit traffic on the Dogger Bank/Up the Thames to find a taxi rank"
- Tyne, Forth, Cromarty, Forties – "Up the Tyne, Forth and Cromarty/There's a low in the High Forties"
- Malin – "And on the Malin Head, Blackpool looks blue and red"

The song also mentions the most westerly point of England, Land's End; "the Queen, she's gone round the bend, jumped off Land's End".

== Reception ==
"This Is a Low" is often chosen as a stand-out track from the album, including as a selected highlight by AllMusic, who describe the track as a "swirling, epic closer". John Harris described the song as Parklife's "key masterstroke" and "close to perfection". Harris also compared the quality with "any of Blur's illustrious forebears" including the Beatles. It was included on the band's Best Of and 2009 Midlife: A Beginner's Guide to Blur compilations.

The song has been performed live many times. It was the final song at Blur's Mile End stadium gig of 1995, as well as Glastonbury 1994, where the song was voted by fans on the festival's website to appear on the compilation DVD Glastonbury Anthems. It was performed by Damon Albarn and Graham Coxon as their first reunited performance as Blur at the 2009 NME Awards. Blur also performed the song at the 2012 Brit Awards as an encore.

In 2014, NME ranked it at number 198 in their list of The 500 Greatest Songs of All Time.

== Track listing ==
All music composed by Albarn, Coxon, James and Rowntree. All lyrics composed by Albarn.

CD promo

1. "This Is a Low" – 5:07

== Personnel ==
- Damon Albarn – vocals, keyboards
- Graham Coxon – guitar
- Alex James – bass guitar
- Dave Rowntree – drums
