= Girls & Boys (Blur song) =

1994 single by Blur

Single by Blur

from the album Parklife
- B-side: "Magpie"; "People in Europe"; "Anniversary Waltz"; "Peter Panic"
- Released: 7 March 1994
- Genre: Britpop; new wave; dance-pop; synth-pop; disco-rock; disco-punk; nu-disco
- Length: 4:50 (album version); 4:18 (single version)
- Label: Parlophone; Food
- Composers: Damon Albarn; Graham Coxon; Alex James; Dave Rowntree
- Lyricist: Damon Albarn
- Producer: Stephen Street

Blur singles chronology
"Sunday Sunday" (1993)	"Girls & Boys" (1994)	"To the End" (1994)

Music video
- "Girls & Boys" on YouTube

Audio sample
- file; help

"Girls & Boys" is a song by the English rock band Blur, released in March 1994 by Parlophone and Food Records as the lead single from the group's third studio album, Parklife (1994). The frontman of Blur, Damon Albarn, wrote the song's lyrics with bandmembers Graham Coxon, Alex James and Dave Rowntree, while Stephen Street produced it.

Charting at number five on the UK Singles Chart, "Girls & Boys" was Blur's first top-five hit and their most successful single until "Country House" reached number one the following year. In the United States, the track reached number 59 on the Billboard Hot 100 chart and number four on the Billboard Modern Rock Tracks chart, becoming their highest charting song in the US. Kevin Godley directed its accompanying music video, depicting the band performing among documentary footage of people on Club 18-30 package holidays. "Girls & Boys" was named single of the year by NME and Melody Maker and was nominated for best song at the MTV Europe Music Awards.

== Composition ==
"Girls & Boys"? Four notes. And the chorus is "Boys, Girls, Love". That's quite a universal message, isn't it?

— Damon Albarn

Damon Albarn was inspired to write the song while on holiday in Magaluf, Spain, with then-girlfriend Justine Frischmann, lead singer of Elastica. According to Albarn, the city had "really tacky Essex nightclubs" and a rampant sexual scene among visitors, with "All these blokes and all these girls meeting at the watering hole and then just copulating. There's no morality involved, I'm not saying it should or shouldn't happen." The music has a convergence of various pop and dance styles, summed up by bassist Alex James as "Disco drums, nasty guitars and Duran Duran bass." Drummer Dave Rowntree admitted that he is not playing on the track, being replaced by a drum machine he programmed. He said it was his favourite song on Blur: The Best Of (2000) because he "isn't really in it. It's cool not being in your own song." The vocals were recorded with a demo featuring only the keyboards. This song is written in the key of G minor. It has been described as Britpop, new wave, dance-pop, synth-pop, disco-rock, disco-punk, and nu-disco.

== Release ==
Producer Stephen Street felt that while "Girls & Boys" was not like Blur's previous songs, "I thought it would be Top 5 – it was so downright basic. I felt the way I had when I produced the Smiths: that as long as Morrissey was singing on it, it would be the Smiths. It was the same with Blur: they could put their hands to anything, and it would still sound like Blur." The song indeed reached number five on the UK Singles Chart, Blur's first foray into the top 5. Despite the band having big expectations for the single, guitarist Graham Coxon said "going top five was a bit of a shocker", and Albarn confessed to having his first panic attack shortly after the single entered the charts.

== Critical reception ==
AllMusic editor Stephen Thomas Erlewine described "Girls & Boys" as "undeniably catchy" and "one of the best (songs) Blur ever recorded", praising the band for making the song "feel exactly like Eurotrash", and stating that the chorus was "an absolutely devastating put-down of '90s gender-bending, where even ambi-sexuals didn't know whose fantasy they were fulfilling." Larry Flick from Billboard magazine wrote, "Alternative band takes a detour into clubland with an amusing, word-twisting ditty fleshed out with a trance-like synth energy and a hard, syncopated beat, courtesy of the Pet Shop Boys. Way-hip single's primary selling point is the brain-numbing refrain "girls who want boys who like boys to be girls who do boys like they're girls who do girls like they're boys." Try saying that three times fast. A good bet for dancefloor action, track should also get a crack at pop/crossover radio."

Troy J. Augusto from Cash Box felt that "this track will light up dance floors first, with top-40 and even some experimental urban radio stations close behind. Not what we've come to expect from this quirky guitar-pop combo, which is part of the appeal here. And don't be surprised if RuPaul records a cover of this tasty gem." Chuck Campbell from Knoxville News Sentinel wrote in his review of Parklife, "That great song, 'Girls & Boys', is a twisting, slapping, lusty and instantly satisfying neo-disco track featuring Graham Coxon's teasing guitar and Damon Albarn's endearing vocals." He added, "Those who allow Parklife to continue playing after the conclusion of 'Girls & Boys' will be disappointed initially, because nothing else on the album is so acutely infectious." Steve Hochman from Los Angeles Times praised it as a "delightfully sly single".

Jennifer Nine from Melody Maker said, "The one reprised here is the simultaneously fey and yobbish, clever and incredibly ugly sounds of Roxy Music/XTC/Gary Numan/anything with keyboards worked up to sound deliberately mechanical and ironic and unpleasant." A reviewer from Music & Media viewed it as a "comical pastiche on '80s 'new romantics'." Martin Aston from Music Week gave it a score of four out of five, complimenting it as "an irresistibly feisty pop bite and, as such, a probable Top 10 hit." John Kilgo from The Network Forty described it as an "outstanding, infectious" tune. Ian McCann from NME named it I'm as Surprised as You are, Sheer Chutzpah Single of the Week, adding, "The tongue lolling, deliberately camp-yobbish, mindless delivery and drooling lyrics defy categorisation. The rinky-disco beat is where Sparks meet Giorgio Moroder in his Son of My Father era, the phased guitar adds a rock noise to the mess, and that chorus! Surrender now, it will beat you in the end." Paul Evans from Rolling Stone felt it's "echoing '80s synth pop".

Miranda Sawyer from Select said, "This is a really ace record. [...] A record that makes you laugh and think of mirror balls is a work of genius in anyone's book. Fan-ruddy-tastic." Sylvia Patterson from Smash Hits also gave it four out of five, writing, "An organ-grinder of synth pings and guitar perks which sounds just like Elastica (whose singer Damon snogs). It is the sound of Now! (ie 1982) which was a good sound so that's all right. Sort of." Another Smash Hits editor, Mark Sutherland, named it a "mad disco romp". Rob Sheffield from Spin described the song as "a scrumptiously sleek Duran-gänger, sounding exactly like the Fab Five circa 'Planet Earth' and 'Hungry Like the Wolf'." He added, "Over a Eurodisco bass line, vocalist Damon Albarn croons about a beach full of teenagers stewing in their own auto-erotic juices: "Nothing is wasted / Only reproduced / You get nasty blisters / Du bist sehr schön, but we haven't been introduced"." James Hunter from Vibe called it a "brilliant turn on new wave disco that boasts the year's best bent guitars. They bounce all this into a great English, um, blur."

== Music video ==
The music video for "Girls & Boys" was directed by English singer, songwriter, musician and music video director Kevin Godley and produced by James Chads for Medialab. It was released on 7 March 1994 and features Blur performing intercut with increasingly surreal images. In the video, the band performs in front of a bluescreen backdrop of documentary footage of people on Club 18-30 package holidays. Godley branded the video as "Page 3 rubbish", while Blur found it "perfect". The front cover of the single was taken from a pack of Durex condoms. The video was later made available on YouTube in 2009, and restored in a 4K version in March 2023 as part of the 30th anniversary celebrations of the Parklife album, having generated more than 65 million views as of November 2025.

== Legacy ==
The song is included on two compilations albums: Blur: The Best Of (2000) and Midlife: A Beginner's Guide to Blur (2009). In 2003, Radiohead frontman Thom Yorke confessed on BBC Radio 1 that he wished he had written the song, jokingly calling Blur "bastards" for writing it first. In 2004, Q magazine featured the song in their list of "The 1010 Songs You Must Own". In 2010, Pitchfork included the song at number 26 on their "Top 200 Tracks of the 90s". In 2017, Stopera and Galindo from BuzzFeed remarked the song was "a great reminder of just how brilliant Blur was throughout the '90s."

Pet Shop Boys, who provided a remix of the track for the single release, later covered the song during their Discovery tour in 1994. Their remix was also included on the Japanese version of the Parklife album. "Blurred" by Pianoman features the chorus (sampled from the Pet Shop Boys 12-inch remix) as its key lyric. The single peaked at number six on the UK Singles Chart in 1996. The song was covered by French singer Mélanie Pain on her 2009 album My Name. American alternative rock band the Get Up Kids performed a version of the song in July 2011 for The A.V. Club's A.V. Undercover series.

The song is a noted bisexual anthem.

== Track listings ==
All music was composed by Albarn, Coxon, James and Rowntree. All lyrics were written by Albarn with the exception of "Maggie May", written by Rod Stewart and Martin Quittenton.

- UK 7-inch and cassette single; Australian cassette single
1. "Girls & Boys"
2. "Magpie"
3. "People in Europe"
- UK CD1
1. "Girls & Boys"
2. "Magpie" (mistakenly credited as "People in Europe" on the back cover.)
3. "Anniversary Waltz"
- UK CD2 and Australian CD single
1. "Girls & Boys"
2. "People in Europe"
3. "Peter Panic"
- European CD single
1. "Girls & Boys"
2. "Peter Panic"
- European and Australian CD single (Pet Shop Boys remix)
1. "Girls & Boys" (PSB radio edit) – 4:04
2. "Girls & Boys" (PSB 12-inch mix) – 7:16
3. "Magpie" – 4:12
4. "Anniversary Waltz" – 1:22
- US CD single
1. "Girls & Boys" – 4:13
2. "Girls & Boys" (Pet Shop Boys radio edit) – 3:59
3. "Girls & Boys" (Pet Shop Boys 12-inch mix) – 7:14
4. "Magpie" – 4:12
5. "Peter Panic" – 4:18
6. "Maggie May" – 4:05
- US cassette single
1. "Girls & Boys" – 4:13
2. "Girls & Boys" (Pet Shop Boys radio edit) – 3:59
3. "Maggie May" – 4:05
- US 12-inch single
1. "Girls & Boys" (PSB 12-inch mix) – 7:14
2. "Girls & Boys" (album version) – 4:51
3. "Girls & Boys" (PSB 7-inch mix) – 3:59
- Japanese mini-CD single
1. "Girls & Boys" (PSB 7-inch mix)
2. "Girls & Boys" (PSB 12-inch mix)

== Charts ==
=== Weekly charts ===
Chart (1994)	Peak position
Australia (ARIA)	19
Belgium (Ultratop 50 Flanders)	34
Canada Top Singles (RPM)	27
Europe (Eurochart Hot 100)	16
Europe (European Hit Radio)	36
Finland (Suomen virallinen lista)	18
France (SNEP)	11
Ireland (IRMA)	23
Israel (Israeli Singles Chart)	8
Netherlands (Dutch Top 40)	33
Netherlands (Single Top 100)	24
New Zealand (Recorded Music NZ)	16
Scottish Singles Sales (Official Charts)	6
Sweden (Sverigetopplistan)	30
UK Singles (Official Charts)	5
UK Airplay (Music Week)	16
UK Club Chart (Music Week)	62
US Billboard Hot 100	59
US Alternative Airplay (Billboard)	4
US Dance Club Songs (Billboard)	21
US Dance Singles Sales (Billboard)	23
US Pop Airplay (Billboard)	40
US Cash Box Top 100	59

Chart (2013)	Peak position
Belgium (Back Catalogue Singles Flanders)	27
France (SNEP)	157

Chart (2023)	Peak position
Japan Hot Overseas (Billboard Japan)	12

=== Year-end charts ===
Chart (1994)	Rank
France (SNEP)	50
Israel (Israeli Singles Chart)	28
UK Singles (OCC)	108
US Modern Rock Tracks (Billboard)	38

== Certifications ==
Region	Certification	Certified units/sales
New Zealand (RMNZ)	Gold	15,000^{‡}
Spain (Promusicae)	Gold	30,000^{‡}
United Kingdom (BPI)	Platinum	600,000^{‡}
^{‡} Sales+streaming figures based on certification alone.

== Release history ==
Region	Date	Format(s)	Label(s)	Ref.
United Kingdom	7 March 1994	7-inch vinyl; CD; cassette	Parlophone; Food	
Australia	18 April 1994	CD; cassette	Parlophone; Food	
Japan	11 May 1994	Mini-CD	EMI; Food	
Australia	23 May 1994	Remix CD	Parlophone; Food	

== Vandalism version ==
"Girls & Boys"

Single by Vandalism
- Released: 4 January 2005
- Label: Vicious Vinyl
- Songwriters: Damon Albarn; Graham Coxon; Alex James; Dave Rowntree

Vandalism singles chronology
"Girls & Boys" (2005)	"Never Say Never" (2006)

"Boys & Girls" was covered by Australian dance band Vandalism and released as a single in 2005.

=== Track listing ===
- Australian CD single
1. "Boys & Girls" (Radio edit)
2. "Boys & Girls" (Ivan Gough And Grant Smillie Remix Radio Edit)
3. "Boys & Girls" (Extended Mix)
4. "Boys & Girls" (Ivan Gough & Grant Smillie Remix)

=== Charts ===
Chart (2005)	Peak position
Australia (ARIA)	80
Australia Club Tracks (ARIA)	8
Australia Dance (ARIA)	11

=== Release history ===
Country	Release date	Format	Label	Catalogue
Australia	4 January 2005	CD single, download	Vicious	VG12029CD
