= Modern Life Is Rubbish =

Studio album by Blur
- Released: 10 May 1993
- Recorded: October 1991 – March 1993
- Genre: Britpop
- Length: 58:52
- Labels: Food (UK), SBK (US)
- Producers: Blur; John Smith; Steve Lovell; Stephen Street

Blur chronology
Leisure (1991)	Modern Life Is Rubbish (1993)	Parklife (1994)

Singles from Modern Life Is Rubbish
- 1. "For Tomorrow" Released: 19 April 1993; 2. "Chemical World" Released: 28 June 1993; 3. "Sunday Sunday" Released: 4 October 1993

Modern Life Is Rubbish is the second studio album by the English alternative rock band Blur, released in May 1993. Although their debut album Leisure (1991) had been commercially successful, Blur faced a severe media backlash soon after its release, and fell out of public favour. After the group returned from an unsuccessful tour of the United States, poorly received live performances and the rising popularity of rival band Suede further diminished Blur's status in the UK.

Under threat of being dropped by Food Records, for their next album Blur underwent an image makeover championed by frontman Damon Albarn. The band incorporated influences from traditional British guitar-pop groups such as the Kinks and the Small Faces, and the resulting sound was melodic and lushly produced, featuring brass, woodwind and backing vocalists. Albarn's lyrics on Modern Life Is Rubbish use "poignant humour and Ray Davies characterisation to investigate the dreams, traditions and prejudices of suburban England", according to writer David Cavanagh.

Modern Life Is Rubbish was a moderate chart success in the UK; the album peaked at number 15, while the singles taken from the album charted in the Top 30. Applauded by the music press, the album's Anglocentric rhetoric rejuvenated the group's fortunes after their post-Leisure slump. Modern Life Is Rubbish is regarded as one of the defining releases of the Britpop scene, and its chart-topping follow-ups—Parklife and The Great Escape—saw Blur emerge as one of Britain's leading pop acts.

== Background ==
Blur's baggy-inspired debut album Leisure (1991) was a UK Top 10-charting record that, according to the NME, made the band the "acceptable pretty face of a whole clump of bands that have emerged since the whole Manchester thing started to run out of steam". However, as the baggy scene soon began to fade, Blur were—according to The Guardian—"[s]wiftly exposed as bogus trend-hoppers, [and] they duly caught the wrath of the Madchester backlash". Further, following their fall from public favour, the group found that they were £60,000 in debt, mainly due to mismanagement. Blur hired new manager Chris Morrison and, to recoup losses, were sent by their record label Food to the United States as part of the Rollercoaster tour. To coincide with the start of the tour, Blur released the "Popscene" single; the new release showcased a significant change in musical direction, as Blur traded their shoegaze-derived sound for one influenced by 60s British guitar pop. However, the single failed to break into the UK top 30 which further diminished Blur's profile in the UK.

The 44-date tour of the United States left Blur in "complete disarray", according to writer David Cavanagh. Dismayed by American audiences' infatuation with grunge and the lacklustre response to their music, the group frequently drank, and members often broke into fist-fights with one another. Homesick, the tour "instilled in the band a contempt for everything American", Cavanagh later wrote; frontman Damon Albarn, who "started to miss really simple things [about England]", listened to a tape of the English pop group the Kinks throughout the tour. He later stated the only pleasant memory he had of the tour was his time spent listening to the Kinks' 1967 single "Waterloo Sunset". Upon their return to England, the group discovered that the attention of the music press had shifted to Suede. The newcomers' success displeased Blur who, in Cavanagh's words, "were inclined to feel that every record Suede sold was an affront to human decency". After many poor live shows, which Blur members often performed while drunk—in particular one at a 1992 gig that featured a well-received performance by Suede on the same bill—Blur were in danger of being dropped by Food.

== Recording ==
Damon Albarn, in a 2000 Mojo interview, said that "Suede and America fuelled my desire to prove to everyone that Blur were worth it ... There was nothing more important in my life." He felt the popularity that American grunge music was enjoying in Britain at the time would soon fade, and argued that Blur would embody a renaissance of classic British pop on their next album. Food Records owner David Balfe strongly disagreed, and argued with Albarn over the proposed change in Blur's image. After the still-sceptical Balfe relented, Food warily gave Blur the go-ahead to work on their second album with Albarn's first choice of producer, XTC leader Andy Partridge. Partridge said he was dissatisfied with the songs, but was "immensely" fond of the band, likening them to XTC circa Go 2. He said he agreed to the project "for the wrong reasons, the flattery and the money."

Blur began working on the album with Partridge at The Church, a studio in Crouch End owned by David A. Stewart. However, the sessions ended prematurely. Bassist Alex James described the sessions as a "disaster"; he added that "as it was all being put together, they were all good parts, but it just wasn't ... sexy". Partridge recalled: "I felt quite fatherly and I thought I did sterling work. They got Dave Balfe really stoned to listen to some mixes and he was rolling around going, 'This is fantastic, you're George Martin and they're The Beatles.' Next day he'd say, 'Quite frankly, Andy, this is shit'". The band successfully recorded four songs, but were wary about working in the same conditions again. The Partridge-produced tracks were abandoned; three were later included on the 2012 boxed set Blur 21.

Work resumed on the album due to a chance meeting with producer Stephen Street, who had previously worked with the band on their 1991 single "There's No Other Way". With Street now producing the album, Blur recorded a mix of material spanning both the period immediately after the release of Leisure and their 1992 tour. While the band members were pleased with the recording session results, Balfe, after hearing the songs, told the band they were committing artistic suicide. Although dejected by his response, Blur gave Food the completed album in December 1992. The label rejected the album and instructed the band to record more potential singles. Albarn complied, and on Christmas Day wrote the song "For Tomorrow". Although "For Tomorrow" sated Food's concerns, Blur's American label SBK voiced discontent upon hearing the finished tapes of the album. To appease SBK the band recorded "Chemical World", which Blur thought would increase Rubbish's American appeal. However, Blur refused SBK's demand of re-recording the album with American producer Butch Vig, who was popular at the time for his work with Nirvana.

== Music and lyrical themes ==
It was me attempting to write in a classic English vein using kind of imagery and words which were much more modern. So it was a weird combination of quiet nostalgic-sounding melodies and chord progressions, [with] these weird caustic lyrics about England as it was at that moment, and the way it was getting this mass Americanised refit.

— Damon Albarn summarising his songwriting effort on Modern Life Is Rubbish

Modern Life Is Rubbish's sound is highly influenced by the traditional guitar pop of English bands such as the Kinks, the Jam, the Small Faces and the Who. The album's songs explore a number of styles—punk rock ("Advert"), neo-psychedelia ("Chemical World"), and vaudeville music-hall ("Sunday Sunday"). According to music critic Jim DeRogatis, the album “may have been a stylistic mess, but it was valuable psychedelic garbage nonetheless.”

Opening track "For Tomorrow" is, according to NME, "quintessential Blur. Damon, perennially bored, never stops singing, and Graham [Coxon] supplie[s] his usual immaculate guitar accompaniment". While "Oily Water" harked back to the baggy sound of Leisure, NME described "Intermission" as "a pub piano knees-up that rinky-dinks along then gets frazzled in guitars and speeded-up drums". Most of the songs on the album are melodic and lushly produced, often supplemented by a brass section, string arrangements and backing vocals. To offer contrast to the classicist songwriting, AllMusic noted that "Coxon's guitar tears each song open, either with unpredictable melodic lines or layers of translucent, hypnotic effects, and his work creates great tension with Alex James' kinetic bass".

Deriving from "the biting humor of Ray Davies and the bitterness of Paul Weller", Albarn's lyrics on Modern Life Is Rubbish are a social commentary and satire on contemporary suburban English life. While Rubbish celebrates modern British life, it also takes a cynical look at middle-class existence. The overt Anglo-centricism of the album was also retaliation against American popular culture; James later explained, "it was f***ing scary how American everything's becoming ... so the whole thing was a f***ing big two fingers up to America". NME summarised the theme of the "thinly-veiled concept album" as a "London odyssey crammed full of strange commuters, peeping Thomases and lost dreams; of opening the windows and breathing in petrol ... It's the Village Green Preservation Society come home to find a car park in its place".

== Packaging ==
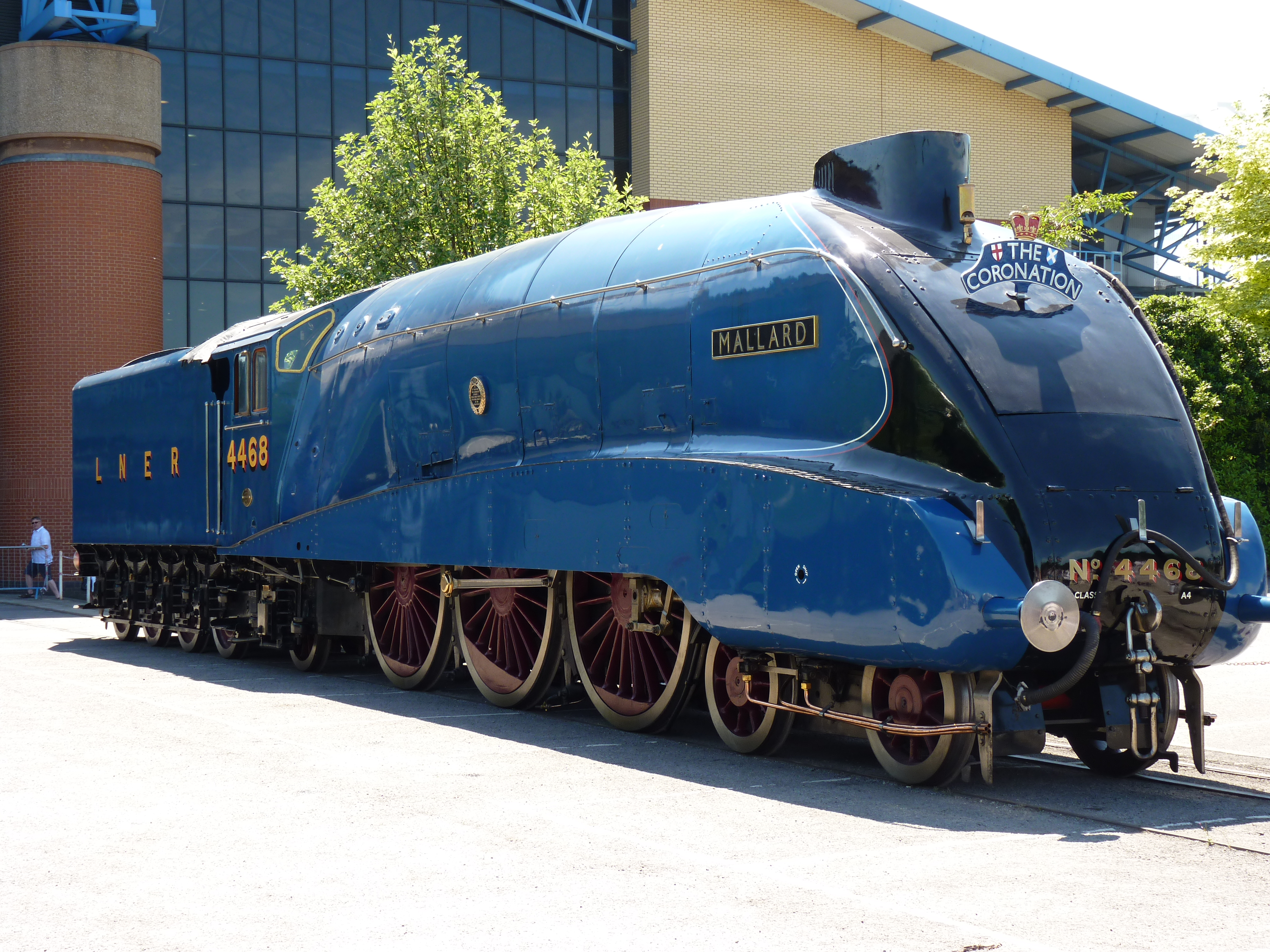
The steam locomotive Mallard, the subject of the album's cover.

The album's title derives from stenciled graffiti painted along Bayswater Road in London, created by an anarchist group. For Albarn, the phrase reflected the "rubbish" of the past that accumulated over time, stifling creativity. Albarn told journalist John Harris in 1993 that he thought the phrase was "the most significant comment on popular culture since 'Anarchy in the UK'". Due to Blur's disdain for America at the time, the album's working title was Britain Versus America.

The painting of the steam locomotive Mallard on the album cover was a stock image that Stylorouge—Blur's design consultants—obtained from a photo library in Halifax. According to Design Week magazine, the painting by Paul Gribble (uncle of Stephen Gribble) "evoked the feel of a Just William schoolboy's pre-war Britain". Coxon has stated that the band chose "a Ladybird Books-style painting of the classic Mallard locomotive (because) nothing could be further from what most people expected of an alternative rock LP". Inside the packaging, there is an oil-on-canvas of the band dressed as mop-top skinheads in a tube train. The album's lyric sheets also feature the songs' chord progressions, hand-written by guitar player Graham Coxon. While Albarn explained that it was an attempt to "[let] people to know that, old-fashioned as it might seem, we write songs", Total Guitar magazine attributed the inclusion of the chords to Coxon's "keen[ness] to demystify guitar playing".

== Release ==
To promote Modern Life Is Rubbish, Food released "For Tomorrow" as the album's lead single in the UK in April 1993. The single, which showcased Blur's new sound and attitude, performed moderately well in the charts, reaching number 28. A few weeks later in May 1993, Modern Life was released. The announcement of the album's release included a press photo that featured the phrase "British Image 1" spraypainted behind Blur members (who were dressed in a mixture of mod and skinhead attire) and a Mastiff. At the time, such imagery was viewed as nationalistic and racially insensitive by the British music press; to quiet concerns, Blur subsequently released the "British Image 2" photo, which was "a camp restaging of a pre-war aristocratic tea party". The album peaked at number 15 on the UK Album Chart. In the next few months Food further issued two UK Top 30-charting singles—"Chemical World" and "Sunday Sunday"—to support the record; however, Modern Life only managed to sell around 40,000 copies at the time. Nonetheless, the mood within the Blur camp was positive, as the band felt they had accomplished something; James told writer David Cavanagh in 2000, "Modern Life Is Rubbish was a successful record because it achieved what we set out to achieve. I thought everything was shit except us".

Modern Life Is Rubbish was released in the United States by Blur's American record label SBK in December 1993—seven months after the album's UK release. This delay was because SBK's alternative-music department had closed down; Blur manager Chris Morrison later quipped, "When I asked [SBK] why, they said it was because the girl had left." Despite fears that Modern Life's overt Englishness would be lost on the American market, SBK insisted on marketing the album to MOR stations and aimed for Top 40 airplay. The label largely ignored Morrison's arguments that Blur's best chance of exposure in America would be to court college radio-stations. SBK's strategy was to list the album at a developing-artist price (around three dollars less than standard), send the band on an intensive tour in 1994 and to target modern rock airplay with debut single "Chemical World". The record company believed this would help expand on the base audience who bought Leisure, and eventually open Blur to Top 40 radio. Further, to lessen the anglocentric feel of the record, SBK added additional songs to the track-listing—including "Popscene". The plan fared poorly, as Modern Life had little impact in the US; the album did not chart on the US Billboard 200 and sold only 19,000 copies, a sharp decline compared to the 87,000 units that Leisure shifted.

== Contemporary reviews ==
Contemporary professional reviews
Review scores
Source	Rating
NME	7/10
Calgary Herald	B−
Chicago Tribune	3.5/4 stars
Q	4/5 stars
Rolling Stone	4/5 stars
Select	4/5
Smash Hits	4/5

Among contemporary reviews, NME reviewer Paul Moody was mostly enthusiastic about the record and rated it seven out of ten. While he felt the album had "enough faults to give a surveyor nightmares", he was impressed that, unlike their peers, "Blur [had] thrown on their old clothes and stormed into No Man's Land with all guns blazing". Moody also praised the improvement in Albarn's lyrics, which had hitherto "[made] Eurovision Song Contest entries seem like great works of poetry". Q's David Roberts, in a favourable four out of five star review, called Modern Life "an energised, infectious romp around contemporary little England, by way of an exuberant trawl through a highly-coloured patchwork of its pop past". Roberts placed Coxon as the leading contender for "the vacant crown of [Smiths guitarist] Johnny Marr".

Writing for the Chicago Tribune, rock critic Greg Kot felt the album was a vast improvement over Leisure, which he found "highly derivative" of the Madchester genre. "Nothing on [Leisure] prepares the listener for the adventurousness of Modern Life is Rubbish," he wrote, going on to describe the album as "a swirling, intoxicating song cycle that enriches superior popcraft with wiggy studio experiments." Although they found the album to be "overly lengthy", Billboard agreed with Kot, dubbing Modern Life "a giant leap forward artistically" from Leisure. St. Louis Post-Dispatch writer Paul Hampel commended Blur for having "taken a bold step [with Modern Life] – backward", and pointed to their attempt at "a communion with past masters of smart, satirical Brit pop". He concluded his positive review of the album by calling it a "series of pleasant surprises [that] offers numerous signs that great things are to come from Blur".

== Aftermath and legacy ==
Retrospective professional reviews
Review scores
Source	Rating
AllMusic	4.5/5 stars
Drowned in Sound	9/10
Encyclopedia of Popular Music	3/5 stars
The Great Rock Discography	8/10
Pitchfork	7.8/10
The Rolling Stone Album Guide	3.5/5 stars
Uncut	9/10

In August 1993, Blur set off on the Sugary Tea tour of the UK to promote Modern Life Is Rubbish. Named after a lyric in "Chemical World", the tour was a success, as Blur reclaimed some of their popularity. A key performance was at that year's Reading Festival which, according to David Cavanagh, was "brilliant". On the tour, Blur performed a number of songs that would end up on the group's follow-up album, Parklife (1994).

Parklife saw Blur expanding upon the themes and sounds they had first explored on Modern Life Is Rubbish; the NME described it as " 'Modern Life Is Rubbish's' older brother – bigger, bolder, narkier and funnier". Parklife debuted at number one on the UK charts, and helped Blur emerge as one of Britain's most popular acts. As Jim Shelley wrote in The Guardian, "a year after Blur were dismissed as too mannered, too retrograde and too English, Parklife was embraced for exactly the same reasons". Modern Life Is Rubbish and Parklife, along with The Great Escape (1995), formed what would be later referred to as the "Life" trilogy of Blur albums revolving around British themes.

Modern Life Is Rubbish remains highly regarded by critics; Ian Wade of BBC Music wrote that the album was Blur's "first masterpiece... which established them as worthy of being mentioned alongside their heroes." It is seen as one of the early, defining releases of Britpop, a genre that would dominate British pop music in the mid-1990s. Writing for The Guardian, John Harris called the album "one of the 1990s' most influential records". Stephen Thomas Erlewine of AllMusic felt that "Modern Life Is Rubbish established Blur as the heir to the archly British pop of the Kinks, the Small Faces, and the Jam" and that it "ushered in a new era of British pop". Mark Redfern wrote in Under the Radar magazine that following Modern Life Is Rubbish, "[a] whole wave of Britpop bands followed in [Blur's] footsteps, and for a while, it was cool to be British again". In 2007, IGN listed the album at no. 4 in a 'Top 25 Britpop Albums' list. Their contributor wrote: "With so many seminal albums to their credit, it's hard to pinpoint one, but this is the one if you are forced into a corner." The album was also included in the book 1001 Albums You Must Hear Before You Die.

== Track listing ==
All lyrics by Damon Albarn. All music by Damon Albarn/Graham Coxon/Alex James/Dave Rowntree.

No.	Title	Length
1.	"For Tomorrow"	4:21
2.	"Advert"	3:45
3.	"Colin Zeal"	3:16
4.	"Pressure on Julian"	3:31
5.	"Star Shaped"	3:26
6.	"Blue Jeans"	3:54
7.	"Chemical World" (includes "Intermission")	6:33
8.	"Sunday Sunday"	2:38
9.	"Oily Water"	5:01
10.	"Miss America"	5:35
11.	"Villa Rosie"	3:54
12.	"Coping"	3:24
13.	"Turn It Up"	3:22
14.	"Resigned" (includes "Commercial Break")	6:12
Total length:		58:52

Notes

- Track 7, "Chemical World" ends and "Intermission" begins at 4:02.
- Track 14, "Resigned" ends and "Commercial Break" begins at 5:13.

=== American release ===
The American release of Modern Life Is Rubbish features an altered track listing. Blur's American label SBK Records preferred the group's original demo of "Chemical World", and included it on the album instead of the Stephen Street-produced version. According to Select magazine, this "defeated the object of recording a heavy rock song in the first place". SBK inserted "Popscene" between "Turn It Up" and "Resigned"; Blur had refused to include "Popscene" on the British version of Modern Life, disappointed by the tepid response it received when it was released as a single. "We thought, If you didn’t fucking want it in the first place," Coxon told Select, "you’re not going to get it now". The American version also features several tracks with a few seconds of silence (tracks 18 to 67 on the CD), followed by two "For Tomorrow" B-sides ("When the Cows Come Home" and "Peach") as hidden tracks 68 and 69.

=== 2012 reissue ===
Following the release of the Blur 21 box set, a special edition of the album was released on 7 August 2012, featuring the remastered original album packaged with an additional disc of bonus material.

2012 Special Edition Disc 2 (Bonus Material)
No.	Title	Length
15.	"Popscene"	3:15
16.	"Mace"	3:26
17.	"Badgeman Brown"	4:48
18.	"I'm Fine"	3:04
19.	"Garden Central"	6:00
20.	"For Tomorrow" (visit to Primrose Hill extended version)	6:01
21.	"Into Another"	3:55
22.	"Peach"	3:58
23.	"Bone Bag"	4:04
24.	"Hanging Over"	4:28
25.	"When the Cows Come Home"	3:50
26.	"Beachcoma"	3:38
27.	"Chemical World" (reworked)	3:45
28.	"Es Schmecht"	3:37
29.	"Young and Lovely"	5:03
30.	"Maggie May"	4:06
31.	"My Ark"	5:57
32.	"Daisy Bell (A Bicycle Made for Two)"	2:48
33.	"Let's All Go Down the Strand"	3:42

Bonus disc notes

- 15 to 19 from "Popscene" single (March 1992)
- 20 to 26 from "For Tomorrow" single (April 1993)
- 27 to 31 from "Chemical World" single (June 1993)
- 32 to 33 from "Sunday Sunday" single (October 1993)

== Personnel ==
Personnel taken from Modern Life Is Rubbish CD booklet.

Blur

- Damon Albarn – vocals, piano (tracks 6, "Intermission", "Commercial Break"), sleigh bells (tracks 1, 7), Solina organ (track 1), Casio SK-1 (track 2), Tannoy (tracks 2, 3), melodica (tracks 6, 14), bingo organ (track 8), Avon Lady keyboard (track 11), Jupiter-8 (track 12), Moog (track 12)
- Graham Coxon – electric guitars (all tracks), backing vocals, acoustic guitars (tracks 1–3, 5–8, 10–13), tambourine (track 2, 3, 12, 13) percussion (tracks 10), black & decker (track 4), anti cat and dog tone (track 5), volume guitar (track 6), triangle (track 13), slide guitar (tracks 8, 14)
- Alex James – bass guitar (all tracks), distorted bass (track 11), handclaps (track 3)
- Dave Rowntree – drums (tracks 1–5, 7–9, 11, 13, 14, "Intermission"), timpani (track 1), handclaps (track 3), loop drums (track 6, 12)

Additional musicians

- Stephen Street – drumbox and handclaps (on "Advert"), S1000 (on "Colin Zeal"), typewriter bell (on "Starshaped")
- Kate St John – oboe, cor anglais, soprano saxophone ("Star Shaped")
- The Duke String Quartet – strings ("For Tomorrow")
  - Louise Fuller – violin
  - Rick Koster – violin
  - John Metcalfe – viola
  - Ivan McCready – cello
  - with Helen Kamminga – viola
- Kick Horns – brass ("Sunday Sunday")
  - Tim Sanders – tenor saxophone
  - Roddy Lorimer – trumpet
  - Neil Sidwell – trombone
  - Simon Clarke – baritone and alto saxophone
  - Paul Spong – cornet

Technical personnel

- Stephen Street – producer (all tracks except where noted), mixing ("Oily Water")
- Steve Lovell – producer ("Sunday Sunday" and "Villa Rosie")
- Simon Weinstock – mixer ("Sunday Sunday" and "Villa Rosie")
- Blur – producer ("Oily Water", "Intermission", "Commercial Break", "Miss America", "Resigned")
- John Smith – producer ("Oily Water", "Intermission", "Commercial Break", "Miss America", "Resigned"); engineer

== Charts ==
=== Weekly charts ===
Chart performance for Modern Life Is Rubbish
Chart (1993)	Peak position
Australian Albums (ARIA)	143
UK Albums Chart	15

Chart (2023)	Peak position
Hungarian Physical Albums (MAHASZ)	22
Scottish Albums (Official Charts)	20

== Certifications ==
Region	Certification	Certified units/sales
United Kingdom (BPI)	Gold	100,000^{^}
^{^} Shipments figures based on certification alone.
