= Parklife =

Studio album by Blur
- Released: 25 April 1994
- Recorded: August 1993 – February 1994
- Studios: Maison Rouge, Fulham, London; RAK, London
- Genre: Britpop
- Length: 52:40
- Label: Food
- Producers: Stephen Street; Stephen Hague; John Smith; Blur

Blur chronology
Modern Life Is Rubbish (1993)	Parklife (1994)	The Great Escape (1995)

Singles from Parklife
- 1. "Girls & Boys" Released: 7 March 1994; 2. "To the End" Released: 30 May 1994; 3. "Parklife" Released: 22 August 1994; 4. "End of a Century" Released: 7 November 1994; 5. "Tracy Jacks" Released: December 1994 (US)

Parklife is the third studio album by the English rock band Blur, released on 25 April 1994, by Food Records. After moderate sales for their previous album Modern Life Is Rubbish (1993), Parklife returned Blur to prominence in the UK, helped by its four hit singles: "Girls & Boys", "To the End", "Parklife" and "End of a Century".

Certified four times platinum in the United Kingdom by the British Phonographic Industry (BPI), the album came to define the emerging Britpop scene in the year following its release, along with the album Definitely Maybe by future rivals Oasis. Britpop in turn would form the backbone of the broader Cool Britannia movement. Parklife therefore has attained a cultural significance beyond its considerable sales and critical acclaim, cementing its status as a landmark in British rock music.

In 2010, Parklife was one of ten album covers from English artists commemorated on a UK postage stamp issued by the Royal Mail. In 2015, Spin included the album in their list of "The 300 Best Albums of 1985–2014". Rolling Stone magazine ranked the album number 438 in its 2020 list of the "500 Greatest Albums of All Time".

To commemorate the album's 30th anniversary, it was released as a zoetrope picture disc for Record Store Day 2024.

== Recording ==
In 1990, a year before Blur's debut album, Damon Albarn, the band's vocalist, had told a group of music journalists, "When our third album comes out, our place as the quintessential English band of the '90s will be assured. That is a simple statement of fact. I intend to write it in 1994."

After the completion of recording sessions for Blur's previous album, Modern Life Is Rubbish, Albarn began to write prolifically. Blur demoed Albarn's new songs in groups of twos and threes. Due to their precarious financial position at the time, Blur quickly went back into the studio with producer Stephen Street to record their third album. Blur met at the Maison Rouge recording studio in August 1993 to record their next album. The recording was a relatively fast process, apart from the song "This Is a Low".

While the members of Blur were pleased with the final result, Food Records owner David Balfe was not, telling the band's management "This is a mistake". Soon afterwards, Balfe sold Food to EMI.

== Music ==
Blur frontman Damon Albarn told NME in 1994, "For me, Parklife is like a loosely linked concept album involving all these different stories. It's the travels of the mystical lager-eater, seeing what's going on in the world and commenting on it." Albarn cited the Martin Amis novel London Fields as a major influence on the album. Oasis guitarist Noel Gallagher was once quoted saying that Parklife was "like Southern England personified". The songs themselves span many genres, such as the synthpop-influenced hit single "Girls & Boys", the instrumental waltz interlude of "The Debt Collector", the punk rock-influenced "Bank Holiday", the spacey, Syd Barrett-esque "Far Out", and the fairly new wave-influenced "Trouble in the Message Centre". Journalist John Harris commented that while many of the album's songs "reflected Albarn's claims to a bittersweet take on the UK's human patchwork", several songs, including "To the End" (featuring Lætitia Sadier of Stereolab) and "Badhead" "lay in a much more personal space".

== Title and cover ==
The album was originally going to be entitled London and the album cover shot was going to be of a fruit-and-vegetable cart. Albarn stated tongue-in-cheek, "That was the last time that Dave Balfe was, sort of, privy to any decision or creative process with us, and that was his final contribution: to call it London". The cover depicts the British pastime of greyhound racing. Most of the pictures in the CD booklet are of the band in the greyhound racing venue Walthamstow Stadium, although the actual cover was not shot there. The album cover for Parklife was among the ten chosen by the Royal Mail for a set of "Classic Album Cover" postage stamps issued in January 2010.

== Reception ==
Professional ratings
Initial reviews (in 1994)
Review scores
Source	Rating
Chicago Tribune	3.5/4 stars
Los Angeles Times	3.5/4 stars
Music Week	5/5 stars
NME	9/10
Q	4/5 stars
Rolling Stone	4/5 stars
Select	5/5 medals

Professional ratings
Retrospective reviews (after 1994)
Review scores
Source	Rating
AllMusic	5/5 stars
Encyclopedia of Popular Music	4/5 stars
Pitchfork	9.5/10
The Rolling Stone Album Guide	4.5/5 stars

Parklife was met with critical acclaim. Johnny Dee, reviewing Parklife for NME, called it "a great pop record", adding "On paper it sounds like hell, in practice it's joyous." Paul Evans of Rolling Stone stated that with "one of this year's best albums", the band "realize their cheeky ambition: to reassert all the style and wit, boy bonding and stardom aspiration that originally made British rock so dazzling." Conversely, Robert Christgau of The Village Voice indicated that the only good song on the album was "Girls & Boys".

Parklife remains one of the most acclaimed albums of the 1990s. In a retrospective review, AllMusic's Stephen Thomas Erlewine commented: "By tying the past and the present together, Blur articulated the mid-'90s zeitgeist and produced an epoch-defining record."

=== Commercial performance ===
Upon release, Parklife debuted at number one on the UK Albums Chart and stayed on the chart for 90 weeks. It reached number six on the Billboard Top Heatseekers album chart in the United States. In the UK it sold 27,000 copies in its first week and would see a resurgence in sales the week before Christmas of 1994, with weekly sales of 40,000. Parklife is Blur's bestselling studio album in the UK, with just over a million copies sold.

=== Accolades ===
Parklife has received accolades since its official release and is largely seen as one of the best albums of the 1990s. The album was nominated to the 1994 Mercury Prize, but it lost to M People's Elegant Slumming. Blur also won four awards at the 1995 Brit Awards, including Best British Album for Parklife. The album was listed as one of the 1001 Albums You Must Hear Before You Die.

In 2000 it was voted number 95 in Colin Larkin's All Time Top 1000 Albums. He stated "Parklife was a stunning album of high-quality, undeniably English pop."

In 2003, Pitchfork placed the album at number 54 on their Top 100 Albums of the 1990s list. In 2006, British Hit Singles & Albums and NME organised a poll of which, 40,000 people worldwide voted for the 100 best albums ever and Parklife was placed at number 34 on the list. The album has been hailed as a "Britpop classic".

In April 2014, American LGBT magazine Metro Weekly ranked the album at number 29 in its list of the "50 Best Alternative Albums of the 90s". In July 2014, Guitar World placed Parklife in its "Superunknown: 50 Iconic Albums That Defined 1994" list. The album was ranked at number 171 on Spin's "The 300 Best Albums of the Past 30 Years (1985–2014)" list. In 2017, Pitchfork listed the album at number two in its list "The 50 Best Britpop Albums". In 2020, Rolling Stone ranked the album at number 438 in their list of the "500 Greatest Albums of All Time".

== Track listing ==
All lyrics are written by Damon Albarn, except for "Far Out" by Alex James; all music is composed by Damon Albarn, Graham Coxon, Alex James and Dave Rowntree.

No.	Title	Length
1.	"Girls & Boys"	4:50
2.	"Tracy Jacks"	4:20
3.	"End of a Century"	2:46
4.	"Parklife" (starring Phil Daniels)	3:05
5.	"Bank Holiday"	1:42
6.	"Badhead"	3:25
7.	"The Debt Collector" (instrumental)	2:10
8.	"Far Out"	1:41
9.	"To the End"	4:05
10.	"London Loves"	4:15
11.	"Trouble in the Message Centre"	4:09
12.	"Clover Over Dover"	3:22
13.	"Magic America"	3:38
14.	"Jubilee"	2:48
15.	"This Is a Low"	5:07
16.	"Lot 105"	1:17
Total length:		52:40

Japanese edition bonus track
No.	Title	Length
17.	"Girls & Boys" (Pet Shop Boys 12" remix)	7:16
Total length:		59:56

All lyrics are written by Albarn, except "Red Necks" written by Coxon, and "Alex's Song" written by James; all music is composed by Albarn, Coxon, James and Rowntree, except "Alex's Song", written by James.

Blur 21 box set (2012) – Parklife bonus material disc
No.	Title	Length
17.	"Magpie"	4:16
18.	"Anniversary Waltz"	1:23
19.	"People in Europe"	3:28
20.	"Peter Panic"	4:22
21.	"Girls and Boys" (Pet Shop Boys 12" remix)	7:17
22.	"Threadneedle Street"	3:18
23.	"Got Yer!"	1:48
24.	"Beard"	1:45
25.	"To the End" (French version)	4:06
26.	"Supa Shoppa"	3:02
27.	"Theme from an Imaginary Film"	3:35
28.	"Red Necks"	2:54
29.	"Alex's Song"	2:45
30.	"Jubilee" (acoustic BBC live version)	2:33
31.	"Parklife" (acoustic BBC live version)	3:00
32.	"End of a Century" (acoustic version)	2:44

Japanese edition bonus track
No.	Title	Length
33.	"Girls & Boys" (demo version)	4:54

Bonus disc notes

- 17 to 20 from "Girls and Boys" single (March 1994)
- 21 to 23 from "To the End" single (May 1994)
- 24 to 27 from "Parklife" single (August 1994)
- 28 and 29 from "End of a Century" single (November 1994)
- 30 and 31 previously unreleased BBC Radio 1 – Simon Mayo, 1994
- 32 from "End of a Century" Spanish CD Promo
- 33 is previously unreleased

== Personnel ==
=== Blur ===
- Damon Albarn – lead and backing vocals, piano, Hammond organ, Moog, string synthesiser, harpsichord, melodica, vibraphone, recorder, programming
- Graham Coxon – electric and acoustic guitars, backing vocals, clarinet, saxophone, percussion
- Alex James – bass guitar, vocals on "Far Out", crowd noise
- Dave Rowntree – drums, percussion, programming, crowd noise

=== Additional musicians ===
- Stephen Street – synthesiser (credited as "vintage" keys), sound effects, programming
- Lætitia Sadier – "chanteuse" on "To the End"
- Phil Daniels – narration on "Parklife"
- Stephen Hague – accordion on "To the End"

String quartet on "To the End"

- Chris Tombling
- Audrey Riley
- Leo Payne MBE
- Chris Pitsillides

Duke strings on "Tracy Jacks"

- Louisa Fuller – violin
- Mark Pharoah – violin
- John Metcalfe – viola, string arrangement
- Ivan McCready – cello

Kick Horns

- Richard Edwards – trombone on "End of a Century"
- Roddy Lorimer – flugelhorn on "End of a Century", trombone on "Badhead"
- Tim Sanders – tenor sax on "Badhead" and "The Debt Collector", soprano sax on "The Debt Collector"
- Simon Clarke – baritone sax on "Badhead" on "The Debt Collector", alto sax on "The Debt Collector", flute on "The Debt Collector"
- Neil Sidwell – trombone on "The Debt Collector"

=== Production ===
- Stephen Street – production (all except "To the End")
- Stephen Hague – production and additional engineering on "To the End"
- John Smith – engineering, production on "To the End"
- Blur – production on "To the End"

== Charts and certifications ==
=== Weekly charts ===
Chart (1994)	Peak position
Australian Albums (ARIA)	45
Canada Top Albums/CDs (RPM)	41
European Albums (Music & Media)	8
Finnish Albums (Suomen virallinen lista)	32
Icelandic Albums (Tónlist)	4
Irish Albums (IRMA)	3
Japanese Albums (Oricon)	36
New Zealand Albums (RMNZ)	27
Norwegian Albums (VG-lista)	37
Scottish Albums (Official Charts)	4
Swedish Albums (Sverigetopplistan)	8
UK Albums (Official Charts)	1

Chart (2024)	Peak position
Hungarian Physical Albums (MAHASZ)	10

=== Certifications and sales ===
Region	Certification	Certified units/sales
Canada (Music Canada)	Gold	50,000^{^}
United Kingdom (BPI)	4× Platinum	1,200,000^{^}
Summaries
Europe (IFPI)	Platinum	1,000,000^{*}
^{*} Sales figures based on certification alone.^{^} Shipments figures based on certification alone.
