= Graham Coxon discography =

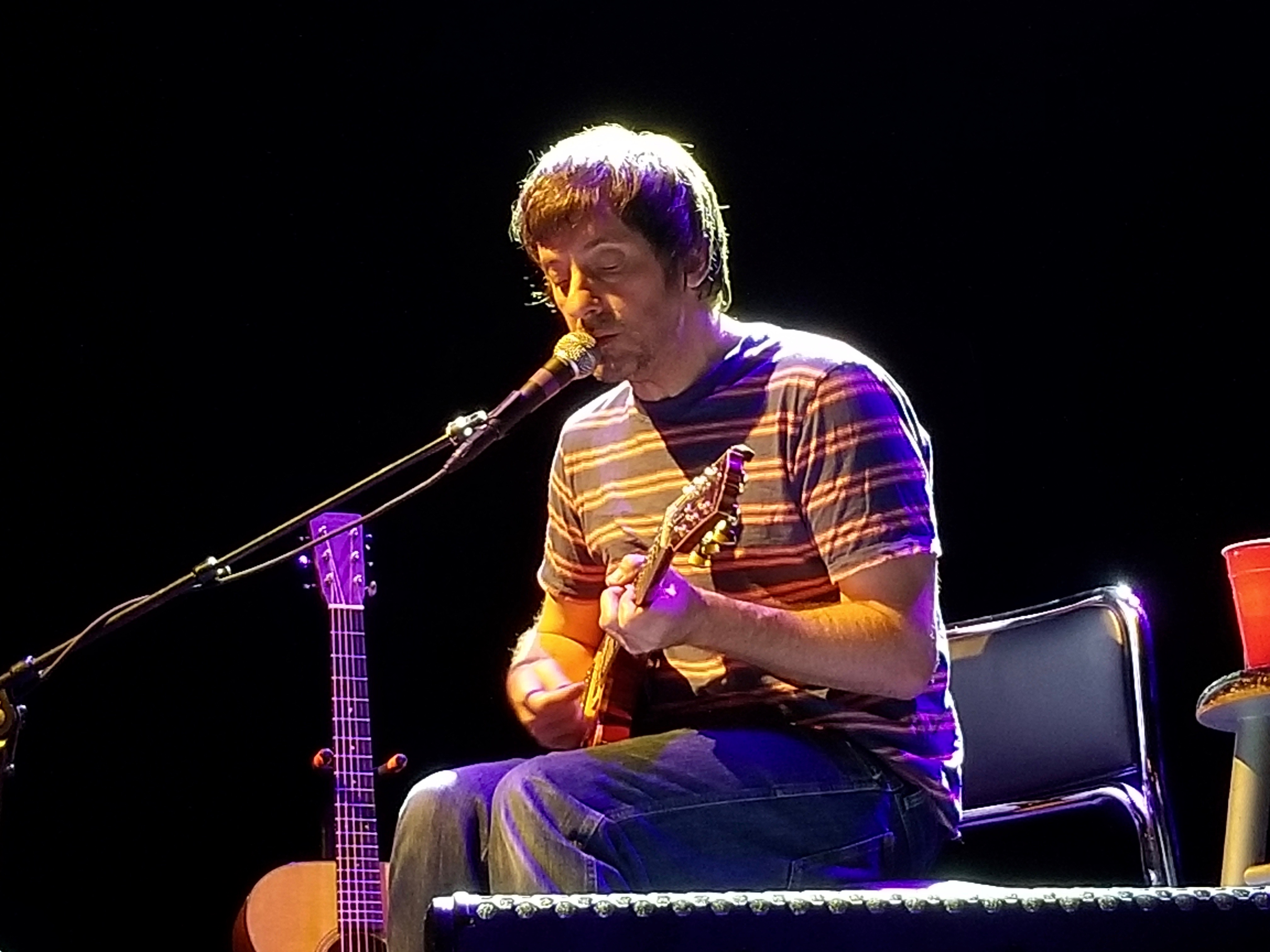
- Studio albums: 9
- Live albums: 2
- Singles: 14
- Video albums: 1

Solo discography of the Blur guitarist and member Graham Coxon.

== Albums ==
=== Studio albums ===
Title	Details	Peak chart positions	Certifications (sales thresholds)
Title	Details	UK	Certifications (sales thresholds)
The Sky Is Too High	Released: 10 August 1998; Label: Transcopic; Format(s): CD, LP, download	31	
The Golden D	Released: 12 June 2000; Label: Transcopic; Format(s): CD, LP, download	81	
Crow Sit on Blood Tree	Released: 6 August 2001; Label: Transcopic; Format(s): CD, LP, download	131	
The Kiss of Morning	Released: 21 October 2002; Label: Transcopic; Format(s): CD, LP, download	126	
Happiness in Magazines	Released: 17 May 2004; Label: Transcopic, Parlophone; Format(s): CD, LP, download	19	BPI: Gold
Love Travels at Illegal Speeds	Released: 13 March 2006; Label: Transcopic, Parlophone; Format(s): CD, LP, download	24	
The Spinning Top	Released: 11 May 2009; Label: Transgressive; Format(s): CD, LP, download	36	
A+E	Released: 2 April 2012; Label: Transgressive; Format(s): CD, LP, download	39	
Castle Park	Released: 19 June 2026; Label: Transgressive; Format(s): CD, LP, download	—	

=== Live albums ===
- Live at the Zodiac (2004) Download only EP
- Burnt to Bitz: At the Astoria (2006) Limited edition CD and download

=== DVD ===
- Live at the Zodiac (2005)

== Singles ==
Single	Year	Peak chart positions	Album
Single	Year	UK	Album
"Oochy Woochy"	2000	–	The Golden D
"Thank God for the Rain" / "You Will Never Be"	2001	92	Crow Sit on Blood Tree
"Escape Song" / "Mountain of Regret"	2002	96	The Kiss of Morning
"Freakin' Out"	2004	37	Happiness in Magazines
"Bittersweet Bundle of Misery"	2004	22	Happiness in Magazines
"Spectacular"	2004	32	Happiness in Magazines
"Freakin' Out" / "All Over Me"	2004	19	Happiness in Magazines
"Standing on My Own Again"	2006	20	Love Travels at Illegal Speeds
"You & I"	2006	39	Love Travels at Illegal Speeds
"I Can't Look at Your Skin" / "What's He Got?"	2006	–	Love Travels at Illegal Speeds
"What Ya Gonna Do Now?" / "Bloody Annoying"	2006	–	Non-album singles
"This Old Town" (with Paul Weller)	2007	39	Non-album singles
"In the Morning" (limited 10" vinyl)	2009	–	The Spinning Top
"Sorrow's Army"	2009	–	The Spinning Top
"Dead Bees" / "Brave the Storm" (7" vinyl)	2009	–	The Spinning Top
"What'll It Take"	2012	–	A+E
"Ooh, Yeh Yeh" / "Seven Naked Valleys"	2012	–	A+E
"Falling"	2017	–	Non-album single

=== As featured artist ===
Single	Year	Peak chart positions		Album
Single	Year	UK	US AAA	Album
"Vegas" (with Sleeper)	1995	33	–	Smart
"Visit from the Dead Dog" (with Ed Harcourt)	2006	76	–	The Beautiful Lie
"Hurry Up England" (with Sham 69)	2006	10	–	Hurry Up England
"The Last of the English Roses" (with Pete Doherty)	2009	67	–	Grace/Wastelands
"Desire" (with Paloma Faith & Bill Ryder)	2012	?	–	Converse
"What You Gonna Do???" (with Bastille)	2020	?	18	Goosebumps
"My America Is Not Your America" (with Mexican Institute of Sound)	2021	–	–	Distrito Federal

== Compilation appearances ==
- Great Xpectations (1993) - "For Tomorrow" (live with Damon Albarn)
- The Pink Floyd & Syd Barrett Story (2003) - "Love You"
- The Xfm Sessions (2007) - "Dawn Said" (live with Wild Billy Childish & The Buff Medways)

== Guest appearances ==
- Sleeper - Smart (1995) (saxophone on "Vegas")
- Assembly Line People - Subdivision of Being (1998) (producer)
- Idlewild - "Rusty" (Poor Soldier remix) (2000)
- Mower - Mower (2002) (producer)
- Beastie Boys - "Triple Trouble" (Graham Coxon remix) (2004)
- Lowgold - "Beauty Dies Young" (Graham Coxon remix) (2005)
- Sham 69 - "Hurry Up England - The People's Anthem" (2006)
- Ed Harcourt - The Beautiful Lie (2006) (guitar on "Visit from the Dead Dog")
- Crisis featuring Beth Ditto, Paul Weller, The Enemy, Supergrass - "Consequences" (2008)
- John McCusker - Under One Sky (2008) (vocals on "All Has Gone")
- Paul Weller - 22 Dreams (2008) (drums on "Black River")
- Pete Doherty - Grace/Wastelands (2009) (guitar on several songs)
- Gorillaz - Humanz (2017) (guitar on "Submission")
- Gorillaz - The Now Now (2018) (guitar on "Magic City")

== See also ==
- Blur discography
- Damon Albarn discography
