= A+E (album) =

Studio album by Graham Coxon
- Released: 2 April 2012
- Recorded: 2011
- Studios: The Pool, London
- Genres: Alternative rock, indie rock
- Length: 47:56
- Label: Parlophone
- Producer: Ben Hillier

Graham Coxon chronology
The Spinning Top (2009)	A+E (2012)	Castle Park (2026)

Singles from A+E
- 1. "What'll It Take" Released: 26 February 2012; 2. "Ooh, Yeh Yeh" / "Seven Naked Valleys" Released: 22 April 2012; 3. "Advice" Released: 9 September 2012

A+E is the eighth studio album by British singer-songwriter Graham Coxon, released on 2 April 2012 through Parlophone. The album was made as a "reaction" against Coxon's prior album, The Spinning Top, which consisted of psychedelic folk songs. A+E, on the other hand, consists of pop rock songs. Coxon, who is also the guitarist of Blur, recorded 21 songs during the album's two-month-long recording process with producer Ben Hillier. The other 11 songs that did not make it onto A+E were divided into a separate album that was supposed to be released in late 2012, but was eventually released as Castle Park in 2026. The album received positive reviews from critics, although some criticized its songs for being too long. Despite its critical success, it was Coxon's least successful album on the UK Albums Chart since The Kiss of Morning, peaking at number 39 and staying on the chart for only one week.

== Background ==
A+E started as a "reaction" against Coxon's previous album, The Spinning Top, a mostly acoustic album. According to Coxon, the songs were difficult to play, resulting in some audiences being unsatisfied in "venues that weren't set up for that sort of thing". Producer Ben Hillier described the recording of the album as "quick" and "fun", due to him trying to record Coxon's first takes on songs when it was possible. In 2 months, Coxon was able to record 21 tracks; 10 of them made it onto A+E, while the other 11 were grouped into an album that was expected be released in late 2012. According to Hillier, the latter is "less riff-based" and more "soul-influenced, with backing singers and strings. In April 2026, fourteen years after A+E came out, Coxon announced the release of this second album, now titled Castle Park, in June of that year.

== Composition ==
The title of A+E refers to Accident and Emergency rooms, while its cover art is a picture of a scraped knee. Coxon himself took the picture. Most of the songs on it feature synths and drum machine beats. The single "What'll It Take" is an upbeat song that features two vocal hooks: "What'll it take to make you people dance?" and "I don't know what's really wrong with me". A music video was released for it. "Seven Naked Valleys" is a post-punk track featuring saxophone that ends with "piercing synth frequency". Opening track "Advice" and "Running for Your Life" have "buzzsaw-guitar" and sardonic lyrics on culture. The former's lyrics are about a bad experience Coxon had at a house party in Brentwood, Essex. At the party, he and some other friends danced to a Smiths record that they used to replace another tape which was playing. As a result, they got beaten up and spent the rest of the night walking around Brentwood thinking of how they would get home. The latter's lyrics are about the "violence of a suburban night out." "Bah Singer" has indecipherable distorted lyrics, and the following track, "Knife in the Cast", is a ballad driven by bass guitar. The final track, "Ooh, Yeh Yeh", is a grunge-pop song that has been described as a "cowboy lullaby".

== Reception ==
Professional ratings
Aggregate scores
Source	Rating
Metacritic	76/100
Review scores
Source	Rating
AllMusic	4.5/5 stars
Drowned in Sound	6/10
The Guardian	4/5 stars
The Independent	(Unfavourable)
NME	9/10
Pitchfork	6.7/10
PopMatters	7/10 stars
Sputnikmusic	4/5 stars

A+E received positive reviews from critics, indicated by a score of 76 on review aggregate site upon which was voted Metacritic, denoting "generally favorable reviews". Stephen Thomas Erlewine of AllMusic gave the album four and a half stars out of five, writing "Beneath all the clatter, A+E has the pop punch of his pair of Stephen Street-music production mid-2000s masterworks Happiness in Magazines and Love Travels at Illegal Speeds, and the combination of precisely crafted pop and fiercely imaginative arrangements results in a thrilling listen." The NME wrote that "the sulky, surly, passive-aggressive Graham we know and love has returned with a vengeance, and rediscovered his finest bomb-blast guitar work." Its reviewer Tom Pinnock called the album "one of the best albums of [Coxon's] career – a pop record with dangerously anti-social tendencies."

The Guardian gave A+E four out of five stars, writing "Coxon's wilfully abrasive eighth solo album might bring him full circle, but it also sends him spiralling into thrilling new territory." Pitchfork was not as positive and gave it 6.7 out of 10 commenting that a listener would be "left wishing the album drew a little more blood to make the stay truly worthwhile." Publications like The Independent were even less favorable; reviewer Andy Gill stated that "lingering this long among a cast of 'wasted people in a wasted world' leaves a grim aftertaste", although he did name "Running for Your Life", "Meet and Drink and Pollinate", and "What'll It Take" as highlights of the album. A+E peaked at number thirty-nine on the UK Albums Chart and stayed on the chart for one week.

== Track listing ==
All tracks are written by Graham Coxon.

No.	Title	Length
1.	"Advice"	2:34
2.	"City Hall"	4:20
3.	"What'll It Take"	4:29
4.	"Meet and Drink and Pollinate"	5:22
5.	"The Truth"	4:43
6.	"Seven Naked Valleys"	5:45
7.	"Running for Your Life"	4:56
8.	"Bah Singer"	4:00
9.	"Knife in the Cast"	6:35
10.	"Ooh, Yeh Yeh"	5:11

== Personnel ==
- Graham Coxon – guitars, bass guitar, drums, organ, saxophone, vocals, cover art
- Pepper Coxon, Sabira Hud, Lucy Parnell, Poppy & the Jezebels, Essy Syed, and Tanyel Vahdettin – screams
- Ben Hillier – cowbell, drums, audio mixing, organ, record producer, Roland Juno 6, synthesizers

Technical

- Ferg Peterkin – engineer
- Joe Rodgers and Matt Wiggins – assistant engineer
- Bunt Stafford-Clark – audio mastering
- Tom Beard – photography
