= What Ya Gonna Do Now? / Bloody Annoying =

"What Ya Gonna Do Now?"

Single by Graham Coxon
- Released: 23 October 2006
- Recorded: August 2006
- Genre: Alternative rock
- Length: 5:46
- Label: Parlophone
- Producer(s): Stephen Street

Graham Coxon singles chronology
"I Can't Look at Your Skin" / "What's He Got?" (2006)	"What Ya Gonna Do Now?" (2006)	""This Old Town" (with Paul Weller)" (2007)

"What Ya Gonna Do Now?" and "Bloody Annoying" are songs by singer-songwriter Graham Coxon. The songs were released as a limited edition double A-sided single on 23 October 2006 in promotion of Coxon's October 2006 UK tour (see 2006 in British music). The tracks were recorded in August 2006 by Coxon and his new band. The single is also Coxon's second double A-side in a row, following "I Can't Look at Your Skin" / "What's He Got?", released in July 2006.

This is also the only studio recording commercially available featuring Coxon's touring band of Toby MacFarlaine, Owen Thomas & Stephen Gilchrist also occasionally known as Burnt to Bitz.

== Track listings ==
- Promo CD CDRDJ6721, 7" R6721
1. "What Ya Gonna Do Now?" – 2:33
2. "Bloody Annoying" – 3:13
