= Castle Park (album) =

Studio album by Graham Coxon
- Released: 19 June 2026
- Recorded: 2011
- Studio: The Pool, London
- Genre: Power pop; garage rock
- Length: 36:43
- Label: Transgressive
- Producer: Ben Hillier; Graham Coxon

Graham Coxon chronology
A+E (2012)	Castle Park (2026)

Singles from Castle Park
- 1. "Billy Says" Released: 20 April 2026; 2. "Alright" Released: 12 May 2026

Castle Park is the ninth studio album by English singer-songwriter Graham Coxon, released on 19 June 2026 through Transgressive Records and produced with Ben Hillier. The album was recorded in 2011—about fifteen years prior—during the sessions for Coxon's previous solo album A+E (2012). Described as a power pop and garage rock album, Castle Park was preceded by the singles "Billy Says" and "Alright", and upon release, it coincided with the beginning of a reissue campaign of Coxon's solo discography.

== Background and recording ==
Castle Park was recorded in 2011 during the same sessions that produced his previous studio album, A+E (2012), at The Pool in London. It had been originally intended as a possible follow-up, but it had been indefinitely shelved so that Coxon could focus on Blur's reformation. In an interview for Guitar World, he said that the twenty (Note: It had been initially stated that Coxon and Hillier recorded twenty-one songs during the sessions, rather than the twenty that were later stated.) songs he had recorded during the sessions "fell into two piles", and A+E was born from the half that was more centered around bass riffs. At the time, he thought he would keep the other half unreleased "until that music becomes fashionable again", but after being repeatedly asked by fans about its status, he eventually decided he release it anyway. While the album remained unreleased, Coxon had frequently performed some of its songs live, including "Billy Says".

== Title and artwork ==
The title is in reference to Castle Park, Colchester, where Coxon spent of much of time during his teenage years. In the NME, he said that his reasoning for naming the album at the time was simple: "it seemed to be quite a romantic and sunny place. I never saw it raining at Castle Park. It has a castle, a bandstand, a little lake, this weird cottage, [and] this golden angel out the front." The cover art consists of four colorised postcards of landmarks around the park.

== Composition ==
Stylistically, Castle Park has been described by critics as power pop and garage rock, sharing similarities with previous works like Happiness in Magazines (2004) and Love Travels at Illegal Speeds (2006), but with more emphasis placed on acoustic guitars and 1960s-influenced mod music. The lyrics are primarily themed on relationships, such as being broken up with.

The album starts with the Kinks-influenced "Billy Says", followed by the indie pop "Alright" and the garage rock "When You Find Out"; the latter is a cover of the Nerves, a band known for the song "Hanging on the Telephone", later popularised by Blondie. After another indie pop track, "Isn't It Funny", the record proceeds with a song that again recalls the Kinks, "There's a Little House". Coxon, who shares vocals with Lucy Parnell, compared the track to Max Bygraves' version of "Gilly Gilly Ossenfeffer Katzenellen Bogen by the Sea", which he described as "a call-and-response children’s song".

Following the acoustic-led "Easy", a song about love and hardship, Castle Park continues to incorporate elements from other styles and genres, such as flamenco on "Dripping Soul", Motown on "Forget Today", and chamber pop on the instrumental "Mélodie pour Christine", which features various string instruments. The album concludes with "All the Rage", an existential song about the anxieties of life. Coxon described it as "probably the most depressing song I've ever written".

== Singles and release ==
On 20 April 2026, Coxon announced Castle Park and led it with the single "Billy Says". A second single, "Alright", followed on 12 May 2026. The album was released on 19 June 2026 through Transgressive Records. That day, Coxon also released his first two albums, The Sky Is Too High (1998) and The Golden D (2000), as part of a broader, year-long reissue campaign of his solo career, including the remaining six studio albums and all three soundtrack albums.

== Critical reception ==
Professional ratings
Aggregate scores
Source	Rating
AnyDecentMusic?	7.4/10
Metacritic	78/100
Review scores
Source	Rating
AllMusic	4/5 stars
Classic Pop	3/5 stars
DIY	4/5 stars
The Financial Times	3/5 stars
Mojo	4/5 stars
MusicOMH	4/5 stars
NME	4/5 stars
The Scotsman	4/5 stars
The Times	4/5 stars
Uncut	7/10

According to the review aggregator Metacritic, Castle Park received "generally favorable reviews" based on a weighted average score of 78 out of 100 from seven critic scores. Another aggregator, AnyDecentMusic?, gave it a weighted average score of 7.4 out of 10 from six critic reviews.

Johnny Sharp of Uncut magazine, commenting on the record's background, said "there's nothing here to suggest [the songs] went unreleased for quality-control reasons". The NME's Andrew Trendell went further, saying that for a "lost" album, Castle Park stands as one of Coxon's best works, and that it "would have been a terrible shame" to leave it unreleased. In Classic Pop, John Earls thought the album was at its best when the record embraced its mod influences, and he also highlighted the tracks "Isn't It Funny" and "Mélodie pour Christine" for demonstrating Coxon's musical diversity. Elsewhere, DIY's Jerrome Volk described Castle Park as a "breezy, accessible" record that has "much to enjoy", picking "Billy Says" as its standout track.

== Track listing ==
All tracks are written by Graham Coxon, except "When You Find Out" (Peter Case).

Castle Park track listing
No.	Title	Length
1.	"Billy Says"	3:42
2.	"Alright"	3:32
3.	"When You Find Out" (The Nerves cover)	2:13
4.	"Isn't It Funny"	4:28
5.	"There's a Little House"	4:07
6.	"Easy"	3:43
7.	"Dripping Soul"	4:22
8.	"Forget Today"	4:58
9.	"Mélodie pour Christine"	3:26
10.	"All the Rage"	2:12
Total length:		36:43

== Personnel ==
Except where noted, credits are adapted from Tidal.

=== Musicians ===
- Graham Coxon – guitar, vocals (except track 9); bass, drums (1–8); saxophone (8), programming (9)
- Ben Hillier – vibraphone (4); concert bass drum, tambourine, woodblock (7); organ (8)
- Nick Handel – background vocals (4, 8)
- Rachel Rosen – background vocals (4, 8)
- Rachel Santesso – background vocals (4, 8)
- Lucy Parnell – vocals (5), musician (7), background vocals (8, 9)
- Sally Herbert – brass arrangement (8, 10), string arrangement (9)
- Matt Gunner – French horn (8, 10)
- Richard Halliday – tuba (8, 10)
- Trevor Mires – trombone (8, 10)
- Philip White – euphonium (8, 10)
- Richard Pryce – bass (9)
- Ian Burdge – cello (9)
- Louisa Fuller – violin (9)
- Richard George – violin (9)
- Everton Nelson – violin (9)
- Camilla Pay – harp (9)
- Bruce White – viola (9)

=== Technical and design ===
- Ben Hillier – production; recording and mixing at The Pool, London
- Graham Coxon – production
- Ferg Peterkin – engineering
- Joe Rogers – engineering assistance
- Matt Wiggins – engineering assistance
- Matt Colton – mastering at Metropolis Studios
- Aidan Cochrane – artwork
- James Kelly – photography

== Charts ==
Chart performance for Castle Park
Chart (2026)	Peak position
Scottish Albums (Official Charts)	18
UK Albums Sales (OCC)	11
UK Independent Albums (Official Charts)	6
