= The Magic Treehouse =

Studio album by Ooberman
- Released: 25 October 1999
- Genre: Indie rock; pop rock
- Length: 50:49
- Label: Independiente
- Producer: Stephen Street

Ooberman chronology
Shorley Wall EP (1998)	The Magic Treehouse (1999)	Running Girl (mini-album) (2001)

Singles from The Magic Treehouse
- 1. "Blossoms Falling" Released: 1999; 2. "Million Suns" Released: 1999; 3. "Tears from a Willow" Released: 1999; 4. "Shorley Wall" Released: 2000

Professional ratings
Review scores
Source	Rating
AllMusic	2/5 stars
NME	4/5 stars
Q	3/5 stars
The Times	

The Magic Treehouse is the debut studio album by English band Ooberman. It was released on 25 October 1999 through Independiente Records. The album was produced by Stephen Street, known for his work with the Smiths and Blur, among others.

The album peaked at #79 on the UK Albums Chart. Four singles were released from the album – "Blossoms Falling", "Million Suns", "Tears From A Willow" and "Shorley Wall". All four singles charted on the UK singles chart, with "Blossoms Falling" (1999) peaking at #39. An earlier version of "Shorley Wall" had previously been the lead track of the Shorley Wall EP released by the band on Tugboat Records. A demo recording of "Sugar Bum" was released as a single on Graham Coxon's Transcopic label in May 1998.

== Track listing ==
All tracks are written by Danny Popplewell, except where noted.

The Magic Treehouse track listing
No.	Title	Writer(s)	Length
1.	"Million Suns"	Popplewell; Andy Flett	4:16
2.	"Blossoms Falling"	Popplewell; Flett	2:31
3.	"Sur La Plage"		3:14
4.	"Roro Blue"		2:14
5.	"Tears from a Willow"		3:32
6.	"Bees"	Popplewell; Flett	1:57
7.	"Sugar Bum"		3:17
8.	"Roll Me in Cotton"		4:00
9.	"Physics Disco"	Popplewell; Flett	2:48
10.	"The Magic Treehouse"		1:34
11.	"Amazing in Bed"		3:17
12.	"My Baby's Too Tall and Thin"	Sophia Churney	0:42
13.	"Shorley Wall"	Popplewell; Flett	4:28
14.	"Silver Planet" (includes hidden track "Stormtrooper")	Popplewell; Flett	12:59
Total length:			50:49
