= The Spinning Top =

Studio album by Graham Coxon
- Released: 11 May 2009
- Recorded: 2008–2009
- Genre: English folk
- Length: 68:26
- Label: Transgressive
- Producer: Stephen Street

Graham Coxon chronology
| Love Travels at Illegal Speeds (2006) | The Spinning Top (2009) | A+E (2012) |

Singles from The Spinning Top
- 1. "In the Morning" (limited 10" vinyl)" Released: 18 April 2009; 2. "Sorrow's Army" Released: 18 May 2009; 3. "Dead Bees" / "Brave the Storm" (7" vinyl)" Released: 28 Sep 2009

Professional ratings
Aggregate scores
| Source | Rating |
|---|---|
| Metacritic | 66/100 |
Review scores
| Source | Rating |
| AllMusic | 4/5 stars |
| Clash | 7/10 |
| Gigwise | 9/10 |
| The Guardian | 3/5 stars |
| NME | 4/5 stars |
| Pitchfork | 4.7/10 |
| Planet Sound | 7/10 |
| PopMatters | 8/10 |
| The Skinny | 4/5 stars |
| Uncut | 4/5 stars |

The Spinning Top is the seventh studio album by the English musician Graham Coxon. The album was produced by Stephen Street and was released on 11 May 2009 on new record label Transgressive Records. It was Coxon's first album since Crow Sit on Blood Tree (2001) to be released while concurrently a member of Blur, with whom he reunited in 2008. It is a concept album that follows a narrative of a man from birth to death.

The album was supported by the single "Sorrow's Army", released on 18 May.

== Production ==
The cover art and liner artwork, like previous releases, was painted by Coxon himself. The two music promos Sorrow's Army and In the Morning were filmed by creative director Nick Craske. Dead Bees, the third single from The Spinning Top, was filmed by Chris Hopewell.

== Live Album Tour ==
Coxon took the album on tour around the release date in May 2009 and also in November 2009 after the cool down from July's Blur reform gigs at Hyde Park and Glastonbury. Coxon played with his Power Acoustic Ensemble. Live Members included Coxon (Guitar, Vocals and Soprano Saxophone), Graham Fox (drums), Gareth Davies (Bass), Lucy Parnall and Jen Clayton (Vocals), Owen Thomas (Bass, Guitar), Louis Vause (piano), Ranbir (dilruba), Bee2 (Percussion). The short tour played the full album in order. The last concert on the list was at the Barbican Theatre in London where Coxon would play with some of his all time heroes. The gig featured Robyn Hitchcock and Martin Carthy (guitars), Natasha Marsh (Opera Vocals) and Max Eastley (The Arc). It also featured Radiohead visual artist Chris Hopewell.

== Track listing ==
| No. | Title | Length |
|---|---|---|
| 1. | "Look into the Light" | 3:18 |
| 2. | "This House" | 2:54 |
| 3. | "In the Morning" | 8:26 |
| 4. | "If You Want Me" | 5:43 |
| 5. | "Perfect Love" | 2:51 |
| 6. | "Brave the Storm" | 5:19 |
| 7. | "Dead Bees" | 3:25 |
| 8. | "Sorrow's Army" | 4:20 |
| 9. | "Caspian Sea" | 4:54 |
| 10. | "Home" | 4:21 |
| 11. | "Humble Man" | 3:43 |
| 12. | "Feel Alright" | 4:37 |
| 13. | "Far from Everything" | 4:09 |
| 14. | "Tripping Over" | 4:52 |
| 15. | "November" | 5:40 |
| Total length: | | 68:26 |
