= Freakin' Out (Graham Coxon song) =

Single by Graham Coxon

from the album Happiness in Magazines
- B-side: "Feel Right"
- Released: 8 March 2004
- Genre: Pop punk
- Length: 3:42
- Label: Parlophone
- Songwriter: Graham Coxon
- Producer: Stephen Street

Graham Coxon singles chronology
"Escape Song" / "Mountain of Regret" (2002)	"Freakin' Out" (2004)	"Bittersweet Bundle of Misery" (2004)

Music video
- "Freakin' Out" on YouTube

"Freakin' Out" is a song by Graham Coxon and was released as the lead single from his fifth solo album Happiness in Magazines in 2004. It was released as a limited-edition 7" single (limited to 5,000 copies) and charted at number 37 in the UK Singles Chart. "Freakin' Out" was later re-released as a double A-side with "All Over Me" (see Freakin' Out / All Over Me).

== Track listing ==
- CD CDRDJ6632
1. "Freakin' Out"
- 7" R6632
1. "Freakin' Out"
2. "Feel Right"
