= Castle Park =

Castle Park may refer to:

In England:

- Castle Park, Bristol
- Castle Park, Colchester
- Castle Park House, Frodsham, Cheshire
- Castle Park Cricket Ground, Colchester
- Castle Park rugby stadium, home of the Doncaster Knights

In the United States:

- Castle Park, Michigan, an unincorporated community in Laketown Township
- Castle Park (amusement park), Riverside, California
- Castle Park High School, Chula Vista, California

== See also ==
- Castle Park (album), 2026, by Graham Coxon
- Castlepark, a peninsula in County Cork, Ireland
