= Magic Treehouse =

Magic Treehouse may refer to:

- Magic Tree House, a book series for young children by Mary Pope Osborne
- Magic Tree House (film), a 2011 Japanese anime drama film based on the book series
- The Magic Treehouse, the debut album from Ooberman
