= Escape Song / Mountain of Regret =

Single by Graham Coxon

""Escape Song" / "Mountain of Regret""

Single by Graham Coxon

from the album The Kiss of Morning
- Released: 14 October 2002
- Recorded: 2002
- Genre: Indie rock (Escape Song); Alternative country (Mountain of Regret)
- Length: ?
- Label: Transcopic
- Songwriter: Graham Coxon (both songs)
- Producers: Graham Coxon & Mike Pelanconi

Graham Coxon singles chronology
| "Thank God for the Rain / You Will Never Be" / "You Will Never Be" (2001) | "Escape Song" / "Mountain of Regret" (2002) | "Freakin' Out" (2004) |

"Escape Song" / "Mountain of Regret" is a double a-side single by Graham Coxon from his fourth solo album The Kiss of Morning in 2002. It was released as a very limited 7" (only 1500 copies) on 14 October 2002. It was a minor hit on the UK Singles Chart, peaking at number 96.

== Track listing ==
- Promo CD TRANSCDDJ020
1. "Escape Song"
2. "Mountain of Regret"
- 7" TRAN020
1. "Escape Song"
2. "Mountain of Regret"

== Charts ==
| Chart (2002) | Peak position |
|---|---|
| UK Indie (OCC) | 29 |
| UK Singles (OCC) | 96 |
