= Shorley Wall =

EP by Ooberman
- Released: 16 November 1998
- Genre: Indie rock/Pop rock
- Label: Tugboat

Ooberman chronology
Shorley Wall (1998)	The Magic Treehouse (1999)

The Shorley Wall EP is an album by Ooberman, following the Sugar Bum single, and was the first release that gained the band attention from the press and music fans. It was named as the single of the year for 1998 by The Times.

The EP's title track was re-recorded for the band's debut album The Magic Treehouse, and released as a single. Two of the other tracks were later featured on Hey Petrunko plus....

== Track listing ==
1. "Shorley Wall" (Popplewell/Flett)
2. "Today's The Day (Part 1)" (Popplewell/Flett)
3. "Serotonin Smile" (Popplewell/Flett)
4. "A Place I Call Home" (Flett)
5. "Why Did My Igloo Collapse?" (Popplewell)
6. "Live Again (Don't Die Father)" (Flett)
7. "Honeydew" (Popplewell)

An interview with the band is placed at the end of Honeydew after a period of silence.
