= I Can't Look at Your Skin / What's He Got? =

"I Can't Look at Your Skin" / "What's He Got?"

Single by Graham Coxon

from the album Love Travels at Illegal Speeds
- B-side: "Time for Heroes", "Outta My League, Dear"
- Released: 17 July 2006
- Genre: Alternative rock
- Label: Parlophone
- Songwriter(s): Graham Coxon (both tracks)
- Producer(s): Stephen Street

Graham Coxon singles chronology
"You & I" (2006)	"I Can't Look at Your Skin" / "What's He Got?" (2006)	"What Ya Gonna Do Now?" / "Bloody Annoying" (2006)

"I Can't Look at Your Skin" / "What's He Got?" is a limited edition double A-sided single by Graham Coxon, released 17 July 2006. Both songs are featured on Graham Coxon's 2006 album, Love Travels at Illegal Speeds and serve as the third single from the album (see 2006 in British music).

"I Can't Look at Your Skin" was played on BBC Radio 1 in early June. The single is the fourth UK double A-side release by Coxon, the last being "Freakin' Out / All Over Me" in October 2004. The video for "I Can't Look at Your Skin" was filmed on 12 June 2006. The single was released on two 7" vinyl records, with two new B-sides. The B-side for the 7" of "I Can't Look at Your Skin" is Coxon's recording of "Time for Heroes", originally released by The Libertines in 2003, from Jo Whiley’s Live Lounge in early 2006. The b-side for the 7" of "What's He Got?" is a new track by Coxon, "Outta My League, Dear".

== Track listings ==
- Promo CD CDRDJ6702, released in early June 2006
1. "I Can't Look at Your Skin" - 3:35
2. "What's He Got?" - 3:42
- Promo CD CDRDJ6703, released in early June 2006
1. "What's He Got?" - 3:42
2. "I Can't Look at Your Skin" - 3:35
- Two disc 7" R6702
1. "I Can't Look at Your Skin" - 3:35
2. "Time for Heroes" (cover of The Libertines song)
3. "What's He Got?" - 3:42
4. "Outta My League, Dear"
