= Thank God for the Rain / You Will Never Be =

""Thank God for the Rain" / "You Never Will Be""

Single by Graham Coxon

from the album Crow Sit on Blood Tree
- Released: 30 July 2001
- Genre: Alternative
- Label: Transcopic
- Producer: Graham Coxon

Graham Coxon singles chronology
"Oochy Woochy" (2000)	"Thank God for the Rain" / "You Will Never Be" (2001)	"Escape Song / Mountain of Regret" (2002)

"Thank God for the Rain" / "You Never Will Be" is a double A-side single by Graham Coxon, from his third solo album Crow Sit on Blood Tree. It was released as a very limited 7" and CD (only 1500 copies) on 30 July 2001. It reached number 92 on the UK Singles Chart.

== Track listing ==
- 7" TRAN011
1. "Thank God for the Rain"
2. "You Never Will Be"
- CD TRANCD011
1. "Thank God for the Rain"
2. "You Never Will Be"

== Charts ==
Chart (2001)	Peak position
UK Indie (OCC)	19
UK Singles (OCC)	92
