= Neon (Australian band) =

Australian rock band

- Origin: Melbourne, Victoria, Australia
- Genre: Rock
- Years active: 2001–2009
- Labels: Transcopic; Ivy League/Warner; V2; Tangled Beat
- Past members: Josh Bitmead; Britt Spooner; Jamie Gurney; Anthony Troiano

Neon were an Australian rock band from Melbourne. Founders were Josh Bitmead on guitar and vocals, Britt Spooner on bass guitar and Jamie Gurney on drums. Their four-track extended play, A Man (October 2004) reached the top 50 of the Australian singles chart. It received critical acclaim in the British music media. Their debut album, Neon, appeared in July 2005.

== History ==
Two Neon members, Josh Bitmead and Jamie Gurney, were originally from Broken Hill, New South Wales. The pair had played in a band, Porcelein, which won a Triple J Unearthed contest in the mid-to-late 1990s. After finishing year 12 they moved to Melbourne in 1996, Bitmead recalled "I had to start life in a new town, looking to play in bands whilst holding down a boring job." Neon were formed in 2001 in that city to work on songs written by Bitmead (guitar, vocals), which included Gurney on drums and Britt Spooner on bass guitar. Spooner moved from Mildura in 1999 and is the sister of Bitmead's friend; Bitmead and Spooner became a domestic couple before forming the trio. In the early years of Neon, Gurney also worked as a university admissions officer. Their first performance was in July 2001. The band started recording demos and supported shows by Dallas Crane, Magic Dirt, Rocket Science and You Am I.

Neon signed a record deal with Ivy League Records in 2001. Rocket Science's lead guitarist Roman Tucker had passed on their demos to Ivy League's Pete Lusty in October. Early in 2002 the trio signed with talent management company Winterman & Goldstein, owned by Lusty and Andy Cassell (also co-owners of Ivy League). A demo tape was also sent to Steve McDonald of United States group Redd Kross who offered to produce a record for them in Los Angeles. In November 2002 Neon performed in LA, New York and London. A year late they took up McDonald's offer and recorded an album's worth of tracks. Recordings included contributions from Pat Smear and Dale Crover (Melvins drummer). Former Blur guitarist Graham Coxon had also heard their demo tape and released their extended play, A Man, on his Transcopic Records in April 2004. They followed with another EP, Hit Me Again in August, which Johnny Loftus of AllMusic rated at three-out-of-five, describing how their "spry, sugary harmonies lock into guitars that rev like muscle cars racing over California viaducts" while "drums are pretty loud throughout" which prevent this work from becoming "contemporary power pop".

Their four-track EP A Man was released in Australia on 29 October 2004, which included the title track and re-recordings of three demo tracks – it was produced by McDonald and issued by Ivy League/Warner Music Group. The EP received good reviews from the NME, Kerrang! and BBC Radio 1. Oz Music Project's Andrew Tuttle praised the title track, "power pop of a high calibre" and the "excellent" track, "Hit Me Again". The EP reached No. 48 on the ARIA singles chart. Neon also supported Jet, the Vines and the Living End on their Aussie Invasion tour of the US.

The band signed a record deal in November 2004 with V2 Records for international distribution. The trio's four-track EP Dizziness was issued on 27 May 2005, which reached the ARIA singles chart top 100. Their debut self-titled album followed on 8 July 2005 through Ivy League/Warner. It peaked at No. 13 on the ARIA Hitseekers albums chart. Gareth Bowles of Hybrid Magazine was disappointed by Neon, "[it] has some appealing tunes, but they tend to be subsumed by the trite lyrics and over-eagerness of the players".

Anthony Troiano replaced Gurney on drums in early 2009. This lineup spent three months in a studio recording two new songs, "Hello" and "Never Again". Troiano later worked as a jeweler after being tutored by a relative. From 2013 to 2016 he was the drummer for Palace of the King.

== Band members ==
- Josh Bitmead – guitar, vocals
- Britt Spooner – bass guitar
- Jamie Gurney – drums
- Anthony Troiano – drums

== Discography ==
=== Albums ===
- Neon (8 July 2005) – Ivy League/Slanted/Warner (IVY036)

=== Extended plays ===
List of EPs, with selected chart positions
Title	Year	Peak chart positions
Title	Year	AUS
A Man	2004	48
Hit Me Again	2004	—
Dizziness	2005	84

=== Singles ===
- "Hello" / "Never Again" 7" (2009)
