= Accident and Emergency (disambiguation) =

Accident and Emergency is a department in a medical facility that specializes in the acute care of patients without any prior appointments.

Accident and Emergency may also refer to:

- "A&E" (song), a song performed by British duo Goldfrapp
- "Accident & Emergency" (song), a single by English singer-songwriter Patrick Wolf on the album The Magic Position
- Accident & Emergency, a 1997 album by These Animal Men
- A+E (album), a 2012 album by Graham Coxon
