= Running Girl =

Studio album by Ooberman
- Released: 29 October 2001
- Length: 27:22
- Label: Rotodisc

Ooberman chronology
The Magic Treehouse (1999)	Running Girl (2001)	Bluebell Morning EP (2002)

Singles from Running Girl
- 1. "Running Girl" Released: November 2001

Professional ratings
Review scores
Source	Rating
AllMusic	4/5 stars
Drowned in Sound	10/10
Playlouder	(favourable)
Q	2/5 stars
The Times	(favourable)
Ox-Fanzine	(unfavourable)

Running Girl is a mini-album by English band Ooberman. It was released on 29 October 2001 through the band's own label, Rotodisc. A single of the title track was released in November 2001. The title track was also featured on the band's album Hey Petrunko (2003).

Aside from "The Kitchen Fire" (co-written by Dan Popplewell and Sophia Churney) all the tracks on the album were written singly by either singer Danny Popplewell or guitarist Andy Flett.

In 2002, March Records released the album in the United States with two bonus tracks; this was the band's first release in the US. A version of the album was released in Japan by Rotodisc with the bonus track "Behind My Shield".

== Track listing ==
Running Girl track listing
No.	Title	Writer(s)	Length
1.	"Running Girl"	Danny Popplewell	4:49
2.	"Flashing Light at Sunset"	Andy Flett	2:45
3.	"We'll Know When We Get There"	Flett	4:29
4.	"Blink of an Eye"	Popplewell	0:38
5.	"Here Come the Ice Wolves"	Popplewell	3:53
6.	"Ghosts"	Popplewell	3:10
7.	"The Kitchen Fire"	Popplewell; Sophia Churney	1:34
8.	"Follow the Sun"	Popplewell	3:18
9.	"Alone at Last"	Flett	2:46
Total length:			27:22

US bonus tracks
No.	Title	Length
10.	"Dolphin Blue"
11.	"Running Girl" (Phantom 309 remix)

== "Running Girl" single ==
"Running Girl"

Single by Ooberman
- Released: November 2001
- Label: Rotodisc

Ooberman singles chronology
"Dolphin Blue" (2000)	"Running Girl" (2001)	"Beany Bean" (2002)

The title track was released as a single in November 2001, on limited edition white 7" vinyl. The b-side is a remix of the track (Pierced Teen indie club mix) by Phantom 309 (aka Ooberman bassist Steve Flett). This remix was also featured on the March Records release of the album.
