= Tugboat Records =

Defunct English record label

- Parent company: Rough Trade Records
- Founded: 1998
- Founder: Geoff Travis
- Defunct: 2003
- Status: Inactive
- Genre: Indie rock
- Country of origin: United Kingdom
- Location: London, England

Tugboat Records was a small independent record label based in London, England, which was affiliated with Rough Trade Records. It was founded in May 1998 by Geoff Travis, who had previously founded Rough Trade Records itself. The first release on Tugboat Records was "Joan of Arc", a 7" single by Low. The label's manager was Glen Johnson of Piano Magic. Among the most influential albums originally released by Tugboat was Any Other City (2001), the only studio album by Scottish indie rock band Life Without Buildings.

== Notable artists ==
Notable artists who released one or more recordings on Tugboat Records include:

- Life Without Buildings
- Low
- Ooberman
- Sodastream
- Spring Heel Jack
- The Strokes
- Vic Godard
