= Ooberman =

English band

- Origin: Liverpool, England
- Genres: Indie pop; pop; prog
- Years active: 1997–2003; 2006–2007
- Labels: Transcopic; Tugboat; Independiente; Rough Trade; Rotodisc
- Past members: Danny Popplewell; Andy Flett; Steve Flett; Sophia Churney; Alan Kelly; Paul Walsham; Jaymie Ireland
- Website: ooberman.co.uk

Ooberman were an English band formed in Liverpool in 1997. The band released their debut album, The Magic Treehouse, in 1999. They split up in 2003, shortly after the release of their second album, Hey Petrunko, but reformed in 2006 and released their third album, Carried Away, the same year. Six of their singles have charted on the UK singles chart, with "Blossoms Falling" (1999) peaking at #39.

== History ==
=== Early years ===
In 1988, Ooberman founders Danny Popplewell and Andy Flett met in Bradford, and, together with Flett's younger brother Steve, formed the Forestry Commission. The band's life soon ended when Popplewell moved to Liverpool, but the three friends kept in touch.

Subsequently, the Flett brothers moved to Liverpool. Ooberman was founded nearly a decade after the previous band, with the addition of Sophia Churney (keyboards and vocals) and Alan Kelly (drums). The first Ooberman gig was in June 1997.

Blur guitarist Graham Coxon heard a demo by Ooberman which he enjoyed; it was released as their first single "Sugar Bum" on his Transcopic record label. This was followed by the "seven-track mini-album" Shorley Wall EP on Tugboat Records which peaked at #13 on the UK Independent Albums Chart and sold 10,000 copies. The band then secured up a major recording contract with Independiente, on which they released the Top 40 hit "Blossoms Falling" in May 1999, which peaked at #39.

=== The Magic Treehouse ===
Ooberman recorded two Peel sessions in 1999, on 31 January and on 25 October. Ooberman performed at the Glastonbury Festival in 1999. In October 1999, the band released their critically acclaimed Stephen Street-produced debut album, The Magic Treehouse, on Independiente. The album peaked at #79 on the UK Albums Chart and received a 4/5 review in NME. The band won the NME Premier Award for Best Live Performance in February 2000. According to Drowned in Sound, "the band didn't maintain their early sales despite continuing critical acclaim". Afterwards, Independiente dropped Ooberman from the label in June 2000.

Ooberman signed to Rough Trade Records, releasing the single "Dolphin Blue" on the label in December 2000. The band left Rough Trade, and subsequent releases like 2001's Running Girl were released on Danny Popplewell's own label, Rotodisc. According to Popplewell, "In the end we approached a distribution company [...] Basically they gave us enough money to fund our own label". The limited edition "Running Girl" single sold out in three days. The original drummer Alan Kelly was replaced by Paul Walsham.

=== Hey Petrunko ===
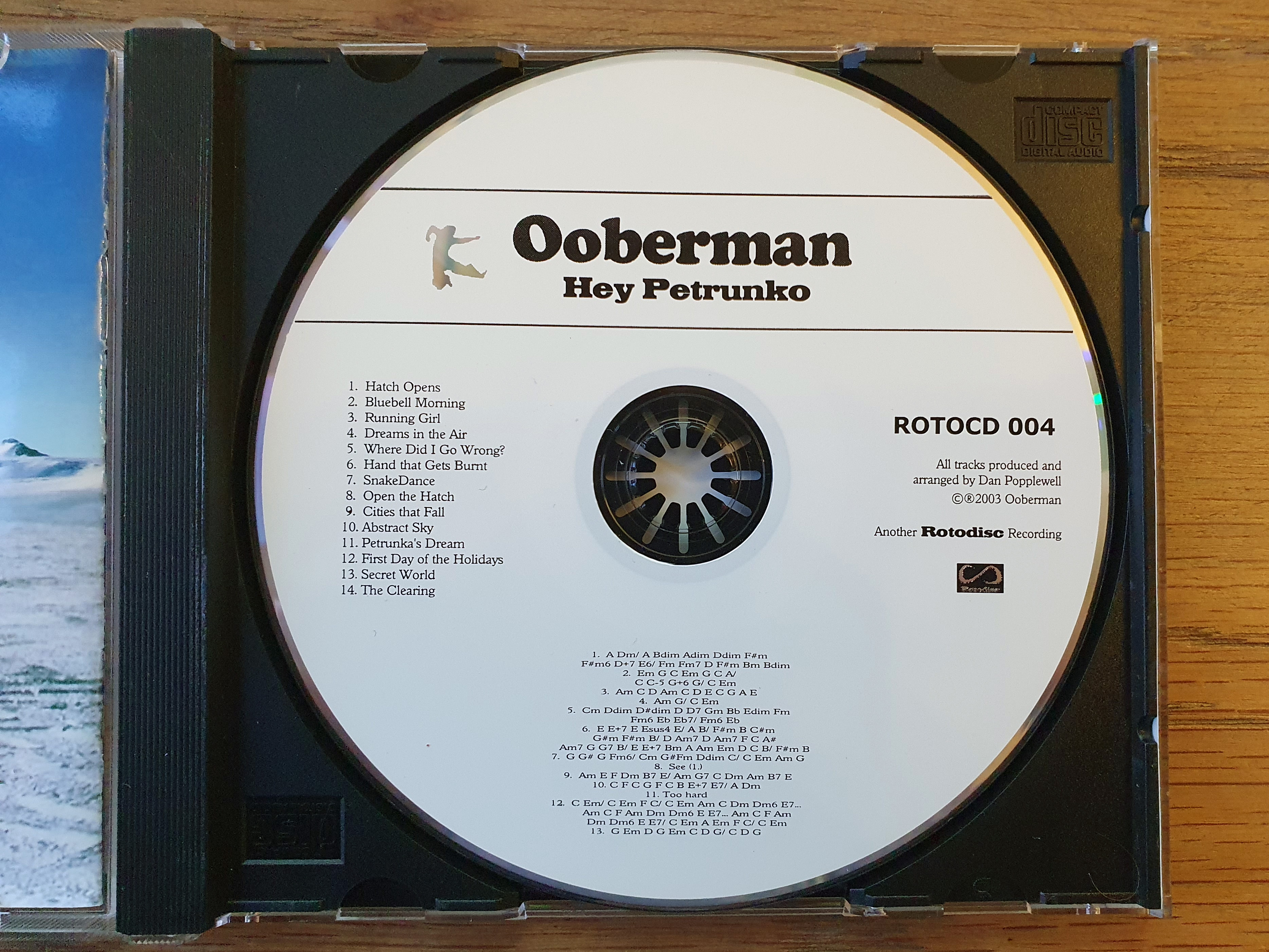
The Hey Petrunko CD album

After two years of working on new material, the band announced that they would release their second album, Hey Petrunko, in October 2002. It was named after a Bulgarian folk song, as Popplewell had been listening to Bulgarian folk music. The band also picked up a new drummer – Jaymie Ireland.

A five-track EP – Bluebell Morning – and a single – "Beany Bean" – were released in 2002, but Hey Petrunko was delayed. The band performed at the 2002 Glastonbury Festival. Hey Petrunko was released on 3 March 2003 by Rotodisc, and peaked at #41 on the UK Independent Albums Chart.

Hey Petrunko "failed to sell enough copies to pay the band's wages". The group became disillusioned and broke up in 2003.

=== Reformation ===
The band reformed in 2006. Their third album, Carried Away, was released in 2006 by Rotodisc.

In September 2007 the band released The Lost Tapes – Rare Recordings 1991–2007, a collection of rare and unreleased recordings covering the period in the title.

== Related projects ==
=== The Magic Theatre ===
The album London Town, featuring Ooberman members Sophia Churney and Danny Popplewell as "The Magic Theatre", was released on 7 June 2010. The album's orchestral sound was achieved on a low budget by Popplewell writing library music, designed to be used as background for films and television, that fitted his songs, and re-using the recordings with new vocals by him and Sophia Churney. They released their second album, The Long Way Home, in 2013.

== Discography ==
Many of the band's releases have been issued on their own label, Rotodisc. Peak charting positions are given in the list below.

=== Studio albums ===
- 1999 The Magic Treehouse UK #79
- 2003 Hey Petrunko UK Indie #41
- 2006 Carried Away

=== EPs and mini-albums ===
- 1998 Shorley Wall UK Indie #13
- 2001 Running Girl (mini-album)
- 2002 Bluebell Morning

=== Compilations ===
- 2007 The Lost Tapes – Rare Recordings 1991–2007

=== Singles ===
- 1998 "Sugar Bum"
- 1999 "Blossoms Falling" UK #39
- 1999 "Million Suns" UK #43
- 1999 "Tears from a Willow" UK #63
- 2000 "Shorley Wall" UK #47
- 2000 "Dolphin Blue" UK #83, UK Indie #17
- 2001 "Running Girl"
- 2002 "Beany Bean" UK #79, UK Indie #16
- 2003 "First Day of the Holidays" UK Indie #38
- 2006 "The Beauty of Your Soul" UK Indie #34
