= Sorrow's Army =

Single by Graham Coxon

from the album The Spinning Top
- Released: 18 May 2009
- Recorded: 2009
- Genre: Post-britpop, Alternative rock
- Label: Transgressive Records
- Producer: Stephen Street

Graham Coxon singles chronology
"This Old Town" (2007)	"Sorrow's Army" (2009)

"Sorrow's Army" is the first single from Graham Coxon's seventh studio album The Spinning Top. The single was to be released on May 18, 2009, a week after the album, by Transgressive Records. "Sorrow's Army" was Zane Lowe's Hottest Record on March 11, 2009. The music video, one of two —the other being In The Morning— filmed on the same weekend, was directed and filmed by Nick Craske.
