= The Kiss of Morning =

Studio album by Graham Coxon
- Released: 21 October 2002
- Recorded: Titanic, London
- Genres: Alternative rock, psychedelic folk
- Length: 46:23
- Label: Transcopic TRANSCD018
- Producers: Graham Coxon, Mike Pelanconi

Graham Coxon chronology
Crow Sit on Blood Tree (2001)	The Kiss of Morning (2002)	Happiness in Magazines (2004)

Singles from The Kiss of Morning
- 1. "Escape Song / Mountain of Regret" Released: 14 October 2002

Professional ratings
Aggregate scores
Source	Rating
Metacritic	70/100
Review scores
Source	Rating
AllMusic	4/5 stars
NME	(8/10)

The Kiss of Morning is the fourth solo album by Blur guitarist Graham Coxon, released on 21 October 2002 in the UK, being the first of Coxon's solo album since his initial departure from Blur earlier at the same year.

== Background ==
In an interview with Q, Coxon explained that the title of the album stemmed from his changed outlook on life after struggling with alcoholism and becoming sober.

== Track listing ==
All tracks are written by Graham Coxon.

No.	Title	Length
1.	"Bitter Tears"	5:18
2.	"Escape Song"	2:26
3.	"Locked Doors"	3:45
4.	"Baby, You're Out of Your Mind"	1:56
5.	"It Ain't No Lie"	2:55
6.	"Live Line"	3:37
7.	"Just Be Mine"	4:44
8.	"Do What You're Told To"	4:34
9.	"Mountain of Regret"	4:50
10.	"Latte"	1:19
11.	"Walking Down the Highway"	3:09
12.	"Song for the Sick"	1:55
13.	"Good Times"	5:55

Japanese CD bonus track
No.	Title	Length
14.	"All I Wanna Do Iz Listen to Yuz"	4:42

"All I Wanna Do Iz Listen to Yuz" was later released in the UK as a B-side to "Bittersweet Bundle of Misery" in 2004.

== Personnel ==
- Graham Coxon — guitars, bass, drums, vocals, harmonica, percussion, producer, sleeve painting
- Louis Vause — piano, Fender Rhodes, Hammond
- B. J. Cole — pedal steel
- Mike Pelanconi — producer, recording
- Anna Norlander — sleeve photos
- Alex Huchinson — sleeve design
