= Bittersweet Bundle of Misery =

Single by Graham Coxon

from the album Happiness in Magazines
- Released: 3 May 2004
- Recorded: 2003–04
- Genre: Alternative
- Length: 4:53
- Label: Parlophone
- Songwriter: Graham Coxon
- Producer: Stephen Street

Graham Coxon singles chronology
"Freakin' Out" (2004)	"Bittersweet Bundle of Misery" (2004)	"Spectacular" (2004)

Music video
- "Bittersweet Bundle of Misery" on YouTube

"Bittersweet Bundle of Misery" is a song by Graham Coxon and was released as the second single from his fifth solo album Happiness in Magazines in 2004 (see 2004 in British music). It peaked at #22 on the UK Singles Chart.

== Track listings ==
- CD Promo CDRDJ6637
1. "Bittersweet Bundle Of Misery" (radio edit)
2. "Bittersweet Bundle Of Misery"
- 7" R6637
1. "Bittersweet Bundle of Misery"
2. "My Little Girl"
- CD CDR6637
1. "Bittersweet Bundle of Misery"
2. "Right to Pop!"
- Maxi-CD CDRS6637
1. "Bittersweet Bundle of Misery"
2. "Right to Pop!"
3. "All I Wanna Do Iz Listen to Yuz"
4. "Bittersweet Bundle of Misery" (video)
