= Bluebell Morning =

EP by Ooberman
- Released: 13 May 2002
- Genre: Indie rock/Pop rock
- Label: Rotodisc

Ooberman chronology
Running Girl (mini-album) (2001)	Bluebell Morning (2002)	Hey Petrunko (2003)

Professional ratings
Review scores
Source	Rating
Drowned in Sound	9/10
Playlouder	
NME	

Bluebell Morning is an EP by Ooberman, released in May 2002 on the band's own Rotodisc label. The title track and "SnakeDance" were reworked and featured on the band's 2003 album Hey Petrunko.

== Track listing ==
1. "Bluebell Morning" (Popplewell/Flett)
2. "Angel of Bradford" (Popplewell)
3. "Souls of the Northern Lights" (Popplewell)
4. "Miss U Miss" (Popplewell)
5. "SnakeDance" (Popplewell)
