= Under One Sky (album) =

Studio album by John McCusker
- Released: February 2009
- Recorded: 2008
- Genre: Folk
- Label: Navigator Records
- Producer: John McCusker; Andy Seward

John McCusker chronology
Before the Ruin (2008)	Under One Sky (2009)

Under One Sky is an hour-long vocal and instrumental suite composed by Scottish folk multi-instrumentalist John McCusker. A studio album was released in February 2009, through Navigator Records. According to a poster advertising the Under One Sky tour: "This large scale composition explores and interweaves the many different styles, genres and traditions at work in today's dynamic UK folk scene"

John McCusker states: "When I started putting Under One Sky together the idea was to do two gigs, one at Celtic Connections and the other at Cambridge Folk Festival. It was such a magical experience though, that after the second gig I knew I really wanted to work with these amazing folks again. Every musician strives to keep doing exciting things, musically, and to play with great people to keep them inspired. Getting to collaborate with these musicians has been the highlight of my musical career so far, and we're all totally chuffed to be taking it on tour."

== Track listing ==
1. "Under One Sky" - 9:50
  - "Under One Sky"
  - "Tom Rose"
  - "Eigg Bound"
  - "With Her Tocher What a Lassie" (trad.)
2. "Will I See Thee More/Hush a Bye" (McCusker/Tams) - 12:00
3. "'S Tusa Thilleas" - 15:35
  - "'S Tusa Thilleas"(McCusker/Fowlis)
  - "Mornin Lion"
  - "Banais Bhaile" (Fowlis/Carr)
  - "Cher's Trip to Scotland"
  - "Touche Pas" (McCusker/Carr)
4. "Long Time Past/Lavender Hill" - 8:01 (McCusker/Woomble)
5. "Jigs, Strathspey & Reel" - 9:01
  - "First Coast"
  - "Theatre" (Cutting)
  - "Nikki's Leap" (Carr)
  - "The Witchery"
  - "Billy's Reel"
6. "All Has Gone" - 4:55 (Coxon)
7. "Jack Seward's/Boys of the Puddle" - 4:00

== Personnel ==
- John McCusker
- Andy Cutting - diatonic accordion
- Ian Carr - guitar
- Emma Reid - fiddle
- Iain MacDonald - bagpipes, whistles, flutes
- Ewen Vernal - bass
- Roy Dodds - percussion
- James Mackintosh - drums
- Roddy Woomble - vocals ("Long Time Past/Lavender Hill")
- Graham Coxon - vocals ("All Has Gone")
- John Tams - vocals ("Will I See Thee More/Hush A Bye")
- Jim Causley - vocals ("Will I See Thee More/Hush A Bye")
- Julie Fowlis - vocals ("'S Tusa Thilleas")
- Rod Jones - harmony vocals ("Long Time Past")
