= Freakin' Out / All Over Me =

"Freakin' Out" / "All Over Me"

Single by Graham Coxon

from the album Happiness in Magazines
- B-side: "Singing in the Morning"
- Released: 25 October 2004
- Length: 3:42 (A-side); 4:16 (AA-side)
- Label: Parlophone
- Songwriter: Graham Coxon
- Producer: Stephen Street

Graham Coxon singles chronology
"Spectacular" (2004)	"Freakin' Out" / "All Over Me" (2004)	"Standing on My Own Again" (2006)

"Freakin' Out" and "All Over Me" are songs by Graham Coxon that appeared on his 2004 album Happiness in Magazines. They were released as the final single from the album as a double A-side in October 2004. The single peaked at number 19 on the UK Singles Chart.

"Freakin' Out" had previously been released as the album’s first single, charting at no. 37 on the UK Singles Chart.

== Track listings ==
- Promo CD CDRDJ6652
1. "Freakin' Out" - 3:42
2. "All Over Me" - 4:16
- 7" R6652
1. "Freakin' Out" - 3:42
2. "All Over Me" - 4:16
- CD CDR6652
1. "Freakin' Out" - 3:42
2. "All Over Me" - 4:16
- Maxi-CD CDRS6652
1. "Freakin' Out" - 3:42
2. "All Over Me" - 4:16
3. "Singing In the Morning" - 3:39
4. "Freakin' Out" (video)
7" back
