= You & I (Graham Coxon song) =

2006 single by Graham Coxon

Single by Graham Coxon

from the album Love Travels at Illegal Speeds
- B-side: "See Saw", "Click Click Click", "Light Up Your Candles"
- Released: 8 May 2006
- Genre: Alternative rock
- Length: 3:43
- Label: Parlophone
- Songwriter(s): Graham Coxon
- Producer(s): Stephen Street

Graham Coxon singles chronology
"Standing on My Own Again" (2006)	"You & I" (2006)	"I Can't Look at Your Skin" / "What's He Got?" (2006)

"You & I" is a song from Graham Coxon's sixth studio album, Love Travels at Illegal Speeds. It was released 8 May 2006 as the second single from that album, charting at #39 in the UK Singles Chart (see 2006 in British music). The b-side for the 7" version of the single is a cover of The Jam song "See Saw" that backed "The Eton Rifles" single in late 1979. The b-side for both CD versions of the single, "Click Click Click", was originally available on the Japanese pressing of the album.

== Track listings ==
- Promo CD CDRDJ6691, released in early April 2006
1. "You & I" - 3:43
- 7" R6691
1. "You & I" - 3:43
2. "See Saw" (cover of The Jam song)
- CD CDR6691
1. "You & I" - 3:43
2. "Click Click Click" - 2:54
- Maxi-CD CDRS6691
1. "You & I" - 3:43
2. "Light Up Your Candles" - 3:29
3. "Click Click Click" - 2:54
4. "You & I" (video)
7" (R6691),
Maxi-CD (CDRS6691)
