= Poppy & the Jezebels =

British pop band

Poppy & the Jezebels were a pop band based in Birmingham, United Kingdom. Members were Mollie Kingsley (vocals, bass keyboard, theremin), Miss Amber Bradbury (guitar), Poppy Twist (drums, theremin), and Dominique Vine (keyboards, synthesiser, vocals).

== Biography and musical career ==
Poppy & the Jezebels formed in late 2005 whilst pupils at Swanshurst School in Birmingham.

Their debut EP Follow me Down was released in 2007, and received critical acclaim. The Guardian described the EP as "clever, intriguing, funny and devastatingly cool" while the NME review stated that it "set an impressive standard for a new generation".

Signing with publishers Mute Song, the band released two further 7" singles on their own Gumball Machine label, and with the Mute Irregulars label. Their third single "Rhubarb & Custard" was 'Pick of the week' in The Guardian and appeared at number one in the NME's '10 Tracks you need to hear this week' feature on the week of its release. This was then followed by festival appearances including the Underage, 1234 and, at the invitation of The Charlatans' Tim Burgess, the Isle of Wight Festival. Alongside growing acclaim for their music, the girls have developed a reputation in the fashion world. In August Conde Nasts' influential 'LOVE' magazine devoted a double page spread to the band, while Vice Magazine gave them full page pin-up status.

After a period spent writing new material while completing their education, the band approached Richard X (Sugababes, Kylie, M.I.A) with their rehearsal room demos. He agreed to produce, with a new single "Sign In, Dream On, Drop Out!" chosen as the first release.

The single was completed in January 2012 when the girls persuaded Mute Records founder Daniel Miller to collaborate – using the original Korg synth that appeared on his recordings as The Normal and Silicon Teens.

== Discography ==
Name	Label	Date
"Nazi Girls" (Single)	Reveal Records	12 November 2006
Follow Me Down (EP)	Reveal Records	15 July 2007
"UFO" (Single)	Gumball Machine	4 August 2008
"Rhubarb and Custard" (Single)	Mute Irregulars	4 May 2009
"Sign In, Dream On, Drop Out!" (Single)	Gumball Machine / Caroline True	21 May 2012
