= Spectacular (Graham Coxon song) =

Single by Graham Coxon

from the album Happiness in Magazines
- Released: 26 July 2004
- Genre: Alternative
- Length: 2:48
- Label: Parlophone
- Songwriter: Graham Coxon
- Producer: Stephen Street

Graham Coxon singles chronology
"Bittersweet Bundle of Misery" (2004)	"Spectacular" (2004)	"Freakin' Out / All Over Me" (2004)

Music video
- "Spectacular" on YouTube

"Spectacular" is the opening track to the album Happiness in Magazines by British singer-songwriter Graham Coxon, formerly of Blur. It was released as the third single from that album in 2004 (see 2004 in British music) and peaked at number 32 on the UK Singles Chart.

== Track listings ==
- CD Promo CDRDJ 6643
1. "Spectacular"
- 7" R6643
1. "Spectacular"
2. "Billy Hunt" by Paul Weller, originally performed by The Jam (backing vocals by Stephen Street)
- CD CDR6643
1. "Spectacular"
2. "Life It Sucks" (drums by Danny Goffey of Supergrass)
- Maxi-CD CDRS6643
1. "Spectacular"
2. "Life It Sucks" (drums by Danny Goffey of Supergrass)
3. "I Wish" (live)
4. "Spectacular" (video)
