= Standing on My Own Again =

2006 single by Graham Coxon

Single by Graham Coxon

from the album Love Travels at Illegal Speeds
- B-side: "Livin'", "Say So What"
- Released: 27 February 2006
- Genre: Pop-punk
- Length: 4:29
- Label: Parlophone
- Songwriter: Graham Coxon
- Producer: Stephen Street

Graham Coxon singles chronology
"Freakin' Out / All Over Me" (2004)	"Standing on My Own Again" (2006)	"You & I" (2006)

"Standing on My Own Again" is a song by English singer-songwriter Graham Coxon and is the opening track on his 2006 studio album Love Travels at Illegal Speeds. The song was also released as the first single from that album on 27 February 2006, peaking at number 20 in the UK Singles Chart (see 2006 in British music).

The song was playlisted by Xfm London and made the A-List of BBC 6 Music.

== Track listings ==
All songs written by Graham Coxon.

- Gatefold 7" R6681
1. "Standing on My Own Again" – 4:29
2. "Say So What" – 2:59
- Coloured 7" R6681X
1. "Standing on My Own Again" – 4:29
2. "Livin'" – 3:40
- CD CDR6681
1. "Standing on My Own Again" – 4:29
2. "Right To Pop!" (Peel Session) – 2:13
  - Recorded for the late John Peel's BBC Radio 1 show on 19 August 2004.
3. "Livin'" – 3:40
4. "Standing on My Own Again" (video) – 4:32
5. "Standing on My Own Again" (making of)
7" (R6681)

7" (R6681X)
