= Hey Petrunko =

Studio album by Ooberman
- Released: 3 March 2003
- Length: 54:44
- Label: Rotodisc
- Producer: Danny Popplewell

Ooberman chronology
Bluebell Morning EP (2002)	Hey Petrunko (2003)	Carried Away (2006)

Singles from Hey Petrunko
- 1. "First Day of the Holidays" Released: 17 March 2003

Professional ratings
Review scores
Source	Rating
Entertainment.ie	(favourable)
BBC Ceefax	(favourable)
The Sunday Telegraph	(favourable)
Ox-Fanzine	9/10

Hey Petrunko is the second studio album by English band Ooberman. It was released on 3 March 2003 through the band's own label, Rotodisc. It was recorded and produced by the band themselves.

Three singles were released in support of the album – "Running Girl", "Beany Bean" (not featured on the album itself) and "First Day of the Holidays". The album peaked at #41 on the UK Independent Albums Chart, while "Beany Bean" and "First Day of the Holidays" peaked at #16 and #38, respectively, on the UK Independent Singles Chart. In addition, a mini-album with "Running Girl" as the lead track, and an EP centering on "Bluebell Morning" were released.

== Track listing ==
All tracks are written by Danny Popplewell, except where noted.

Hey Petrunko track listing
No.	Title	Writer(s)	Length
1.	"Hatch Opens"		1:01
2.	"Bluebell Morning"	Popplewell; Andy Flett	3:09
3.	"Running Girl"		4:44
4.	"Dreams in the Air"		3:38
5.	"Where Did I Go Wrong?"		3:20
6.	"Hand That Gets Burnt"	Flett	3:57
7.	"SnakeDance"		4:01
8.	"Open the Hatch"		4:04
9.	"Cities That Fall"	Flett	3:22
10.	"Abstract Sky"		2:36
11.	"Petrunka's Dream"	Popplewell; Sophia Churney	5:45
12.	"First Day of the Holidays"		4:34
13.	"Secret World"		2:09
14.	"The Cleaning"		4:52
15.	"Summer Nights in June"	Flett	3:32
Total length:			54:44

== Hey Petrunko Plus... ==
A different version of the album, titled Hey Petrunko Plus..., was released in Japan in 2003 by Art Union, featuring ten tracks from the UK version of the album, six previously released non-album tracks and two new recordings, including the new song "Falling Down" (which later appeared on the UK release of their album Carried Away).

1. "Hatch Opens" (Popplewell)
2. "First Day of the Holidays" (Popplewell)
3. "Falling Down" (Popplewell)
4. "Heavy Duty (New Recording)" (Flett)
5. "Beany Bean" (Popplewell)
6. "Hand That Gets Burnt" (Flett)
7. "Heroes and Villains" (Popplewell)
8. "Summer Nights in June" (Flett)
9. "Car Song" (Flett)
10. "Bluebell Morning" (Popplewell/Flett)
11. "Running Girl" (Popplewell)
12. "Why Did My Igloo Collapse?" (Popplewell)
13. "Dolphin Blue" (Popplewell)
14. "Live Again (Don't Die Father)" (Flett)
15. "SnakeDance" (Popplewell)
16. "Cities That Fall" (Flett)
17. "Dreams in the Air" (Popplewell)
18. "Secret World" (Popplewell)

== Personnel ==
Ooberman

- Sophia Churney – vocals
- Andy Flett – guitars
- Steve Flett – bass guitar
- Jaymie Ireland – drums
- Danny Popplewell – drums, vocals, guitars, violin, piano, keyboards, programming, recorder and Irish whistle

Additional contributors

- Andrew Carpenter – violin and viola
- Geoff Churney – voiceover
- Liz McIlwaine – cello
- Paul Walsham – drums
