= Happiness in Magazines =

Studio album by Graham Coxon
- Released: 17 May 2004
- Genre: Indie rock; alternative rock; garage punk
- Length: 45:01
- Label: Transcopic, Parlophone
- Producer: Stephen Street

Graham Coxon chronology
The Kiss of Morning (2002)	Happiness in Magazines (2004)	Love Travels at Illegal Speeds (2006)

Singles from Happiness in Magazines
- 1. "Freakin' Out" Released: 8 March 2004; 2. "Bittersweet Bundle of Misery" Released: 3 May 2004; 3. "Spectacular" Released: 28 July 2004; 4. "Freakin' Out / All Over Me" Released: 25 October 2004

Happiness in Magazines is the fifth solo album by Graham Coxon. It was produced by Stephen Street who also produced Blur's first five albums and is Coxon's most commercially successful album to date. Happiness in Magazines reached 19 in the UK Albums chart and was certified Gold.

== Production ==
Happiness in Magazines was produced by Stephen Street, accompanied by engineer Cenzo Townshend. It was then mastered by Bunt Stafford-Clark at Townhouse Studios in London. The artwork was designed by Alex Hutchinson, with images provided by Coxon.

Alongside Coxon, additional musicians contributed to the recordings. Louis Vause performed organ and piano on “Bittersweet Bundle of Misery”, “All Over Me”, “Hopeless Friend”, “Are You Ready?”, “Bottom Bunk”, and “Ribbons and Leaves”. Angie Pollock provided backing vocals on “Bittersweet Bundle of Misery” and backing vocals and Marimba on “Don’t Be a Stranger”. The Duke Street Quartet performed strings on “All Over Me”, “Hopeless Friend”, and “Are You Ready?”. Marcus Bates, Pip Eastop, and Phillip Woods performed French horns on “Ribbons and Leaves”. John Metcalf arranged the string and horn parts.

== Singles ==
Four singles were released from Happiness in Magazines.

- "Freakin' Out", released 8 March 2004 - charted at #37
- "Bittersweet Bundle of Misery", released 3 May 2004 - charted at #22
- "Spectacular", released 26 July 2004 - charted at #32
- "Freakin' Out" / "All Over Me", released 25 October 2004 - charted at #19

== Reception ==
Professional ratings
Aggregate scores
Source	Rating
Metacritic	77/100
Review scores
Source	Rating
AllMusic	4.5/5 stars
Pitchfork	7.5/10
PopMatters	7/10
Q	4/5 stars
Rolling Stone	3/5 stars
Tiny Mix Tapes	3.5/5 stars
Uncut	4/5 stars
Encyclopedia of Popular Music	4/5 stars

Happiness in Magazines was met with generally favourable reviews from music critics. At Metacritic, which assigns a normalized rating out of 100 to reviews from mainstream publications, the album received an average score of 77, based on 23 reviews.

== Track listing ==
All lyrics and music written by Graham Coxon.

No.	Title	Length
1.	"Spectacular"	2:48
2.	"No Good Time"	3:21
3.	"Girl Done Gone"	3:57
4.	"Bittersweet Bundle of Misery"	4:53
5.	"All Over Me"	4:16
6.	"Freakin' Out"	3:42
7.	"People of the Earth"	3:04
8.	"Hopeless Friend"	3:22
9.	"Are You Ready?"	4:42
10.	"Bottom Bunk"	3:16
11.	"Don't Be a Stranger"	3:29
12.	"Ribbons and Leaves"	4:11
Total length:		45:01

== Personnel ==
Personnel per booklet and sleeve.

Musicians

- Graham Coxon – performer
- Louis Vause – organ (tracks 4, 5, 8–10 and 12), piano (tracks 4, 5, 8–10 and 12)
- Angie Pollock – backing vocals (tracks 4 and 11), marimba (track 11)
- The Duke Street Quartet – strings (tracks 5, 8 and 9)
- John Metcalf – stringer arranger (tracks 5, 8 and 9), horns arranger (track 12)
- Marcus Bates – French horns (track 12)
- Pip Eastop – French horns (track 12)
- Phillip Woods – French horns (track 12)

Production and design

- Stephen Street – producer
- Cenzo Townshend – engineer
- Bunt Stafford-Clark – mastering
- Graham Coxon – images
- Alex Hutchinson – design
