= The Golden D =

Studio album by Graham Coxon
- Released: 12 June 2000
- Recorded: January 2000
- Genre: Alternative rock, indie rock, noise punk, lo-fi
- Length: 44:20
- Label: Transcopic
- Producer: Graham Coxon

Graham Coxon chronology
The Sky Is Too High (1998)	The Golden D (2000)	Crow Sit on Blood Tree (2001)

The Golden D is the second solo album by Blur guitarist Graham Coxon, released in 2000. This outing saw him come back with some heavier, even lower-fi guitars and vocals. With only one track reminiscent of The Sky Is Too High, "Keep Hope Alive," the album was a departure from both Blur and his previous work. The album features two covers, "Fame and Fortune" and "That's When I Reach for My Revolver", both from early eighties post punk band Mission of Burma. All other tracks were written by Coxon, who recorded all instruments, produced and mixed the album as well. The title of the album is a tongue in cheek reference to his favourite guitar chord, possibly at the time or a constant preference.

The album cover is a portion of Coxon's painting "The Blue Dog".

== Critical reception ==
Professional ratings
Aggregate scores
Source	Rating
Metacritic	56/100
Review scores
Source	Rating
AllMusic	3/5 stars
Dotmusic	1/5 stars
Entertainment Weekly	C+
Mojo	3/5 stars
The New Zealand Herald	1/5 stars
NME	6/10
Q	3/5 stars
Rolling Stone	2.5/5 stars
Select	3/5 stars

The Golden D was met with "mixed or average" reviews from critics. At Metacritic, which assigns a weighted average rating out of 100 to reviews from mainstream publications, this release received an average score of 56 based on 13 reviews.

In a review for AllMusic, Amy Schroeder said: "Golden D which is named after the musical chord, focuses on rock - the hard and fast variety - and suggests Sonic Youth and Sex Pistols."

== Track listing ==
All songs are written by Graham Coxon, except where noted otherwise.

No.	Title	Writer(s)	Length
1.	"Jamie Thomas"		2:32
2.	"The Fear"		3:02
3.	"Satan I Gatan"		3:18
4.	"Fame and Fortune"	Roger Miller	3:35
5.	"My Idea of Hell"		2:14
6.	"Lake"		7:34
7.	"Fags and Failure"		1:54
8.	"Leave Me Alone"		3:10
9.	"Keep Hope Alive"		3:56
10.	"Oochy Woochy"		4:24
11.	"That's When I Reach for My Revolver"	Clint Conley	3:58
12.	"Don't Think About Always"		4:43
Total length:			44:20
