= The Sky Is Too High =

Studio album by Graham Coxon
- Released: 10 August 1998
- Recorded: 1998
- Length: 36:20
- Label: Transcopic
- Producer: Graham Coxon

Graham Coxon chronology
The Sky Is Too High (1998)	The Golden D (2000)

The Sky Is Too High is the debut solo studio album by English musician Graham Coxon. It was released on 10 August 1998 through Coxon's own label, Transcopic Records. Coxon, known for being the guitarist of the rock band Blur, wrote, recorded and produced all the music on The Sky Is Too High himself. Most of the album consists of lo-fi acoustic songs with some overdubbed electric guitar and percussion, similar in style to the Blur songs "Miss America" (from Modern Life Is Rubbish) and "You're So Great" (from Blur, one of the few Blur songs with Coxon singing lead vocals).

== Critical reception ==
Professional ratings
Review scores
Source	Rating
AllMusic	3/5 stars
NME	7/10
Pitchfork Media	5.6/10
Select	3/5 medals
Spin	1/10

The Guardian said that, "while there's nothing here to rival the fragility of Syd Barrett's 'Dark Globe' or the irreverence of the Silver Jews, Coxon displays an unsuppressable gift for musical bumbling, one that is impressive even when he doesn't seem to care at all."

== Track listing ==
All tracks are written by Graham Coxon.

No.	Title	Length
1.	"That's All I Wanna Do"	4:29
2.	"Where'd You Go?"	3:36
3.	"In a Salty Sea"	2:46
4.	"A Day Is Far Too Long"	4:27
5.	"R U Lonely?"	2:52
6.	"I Wish"	4:47
7.	"Hard and Slow"	2:26
8.	"Me You, We Two"	2:38
9.	"Waiting"	2:45
10.	"Who the Fuck?"	3:16
11.	"Mornin' Blues"	2:18

On the album cover, another song titled "(pause)" is listed in the track list between "Who the Fuck?" and "Mornin' Blues" but it has been crossed out, making it unreadable. There are however only 11 songs on the album and there is no track between "Who the Fuck?" and "Mornin' Blues".
