= Crow Sit on Blood Tree =

Studio album by Graham Coxon
- Released: 6 August 2001
- Recorded: 2001
- Genre: Psychedelic folk, indie rock, lo-fi
- Length: 50:34
- Label: Transcopic
- Producer: Graham Coxon

Graham Coxon chronology
The Golden D (2000)	Crow Sit on Blood Tree (2001)	The Kiss of Morning (2002)

Singles from Crow Sit on Blood Tree
- 1. "Thank God for the Rain / You Will Never Be" Released: 30 July 2001

Professional ratings
Aggregate scores
Source	Rating
Metacritic	69/100
Review scores
Source	Rating
Allmusic	link

Crow Sit on Blood Tree is the third solo album by Blur guitarist Graham Coxon, released in 2001. Notably, it is perhaps the darkest and quietest of Coxon's albums, containing mournful ballads ("All Has Gone", "A Place for Grief"), folky tracks ("Too Uptight", "Thank God for the Rain") and Coxon's signature overdriven rock songs ("Burn it Down", "Empty Word").

== Track listing ==
All tracks are written by Graham Coxon.

No.	Title	Length
1.	"Empty Word"	5:36
2.	"I'm Goin' Away"	3:17
3.	"All Has Gone"	4:22
4.	"Burn It Down"	3:27
5.	"Too Uptight"	4:10
6.	"Big Bird"	5:11
7.	"Tired"	2:20
8.	"Hurt Prone"	4:15
9.	"Bonfires"	3:41
10.	"Thank God for the Rain"	3:58
11.	"You Never Will Be"	4:36
12.	"A Place for Grief"	5:32

There is a hidden track of a low guitar-humming sound at the end of "A Place for Grief".
