= Hurry Up England =

"Hurry Up England – The People's Anthem"

Single by Sham 69 and The Special Assembly
- Released: 12 June 2006
- Recorded: 2006
- Genre: Punk, Oi!
- Length: 3:12
- Label: Parlophone
- Producer: Stephen Street

"Hurry Up England – The People's Anthem" is a charity single by English punk rock band Sham 69, featuring Graham Coxon on guitar. The single – a somewhat opportunistic re-working of Sham 69's earlier hit "Hurry Up Harry", was recorded as an alternative football anthem for England's entry in the 2006 FIFA World Cup. It was released 12 June 2006 as "The People's Anthem," after being voted on by fans of Virgin Radio DJ Christian O'Connell's morning show (see 2006 in British music).

On 17 June, the single debuted at #84 in the UK Singles Chart. The song rose and peaked at #10 on its second week, two places below the official song of the England squad, "World at Your Feet" by Embrace. The single fell to #31 during its third week in the chart, and then to #50 in its fourth week.

Jimmy Pursey recorded this after two alternative versions by Jump the Woods and Motey's Sheep skin - both given permission by Dave Parsons of Sham 69 to use the tune were released. Christian O'Connell chose to ignore both entries - that are far superior and promoted Jimmy's version.

== Track listings ==
- 7" R6704, CD CDR6704
1. "Hurry Up England – The People's Anthem" (Sham 69 and The Special Assembly)
2. "All Go Mad" (Howling at the Moon + The Dorchester Raiders Under 8's Football Team)

== Chart performance ==
Weekly chart performance for "Hurry Up England"
Chart (2006)	Peak position
UK Singles (OCC)	10
