= This Old Town =

Single by Paul Weller and Graham Coxon
- B-side: "Each New Morning", "Black River"
- Released: 2 July 2007
- Length: 12:13
- Label: Regal Records
- Songwriters: Paul Weller, Graham Coxon
- Producer: Charles Rees

Paul Weller singles chronology
"Wild Blue Yonder" (2006)	"This Old Town" (2007)	"Are You Trying To Be Lonely" (2007)

Graham Coxon singles chronology
"Bloody Annoying" / "What Ya Gonna Do Now?" (2006)	"This Old Town" (2007)	"Sorrow's Army" (2009)

"This Old Town" is a song collaboration by English musicians Paul Weller (formerly of The Jam and The Style Council) and Graham Coxon (of Blur fame). The song was released as a download single on 2 July 2007, and a limited edition 7" on 30 July (see 2007 in British music). The song also features Zak Starkey (of The Who and Oasis fame) on drums. The single peaked at #39 in the UK Singles Chart.

It was recorded at Black Barn Studios, Ripley, Surrey being engineered by Charles Rees.

In some places the song and its B-sides have been advertised as a "triple A-side."

== Track listing ==
1. "This Old Town" (Graham Coxon, Paul Weller) - 4:13
2. "Each New Morning" (Graham Coxon) - 4:10
3. "Black River" (Paul Weller) - 3:50

This Old Town was previously recorded by Ocean Colour Scene as "For Dancers Only", included in their album On the Leyline.
