= Love Travels at Illegal Speeds =

Studio album by Graham Coxon
- Released: 13 March 2006
- Recorded: 2005
- Genre: Alternative rock
- Length: 50:40
- Language: English
- Label: Parlophone
- Producer: Stephen Street

Graham Coxon chronology
Happiness in Magazines (2004)	Love Travels at Illegal Speeds (2006)	Burnt to Bitz: At the Astoria (2006)

Singles from Love Travels at Illegal Speeds
- 1. "Standing on My Own Again" Released: 27 February 2006; 2. "You & I" Released: 8 May 2006; 3. "I Can't Look at Your Skin / What's He Got?" Released: 17 July 2006

Professional ratings
Aggregate scores
Source	Rating
Metacritic	81/100
Review scores
Source	Rating
AllMusic	4.5/5 stars
Encyclopedia of Popular Music	4/5 stars
The Guardian	4/5 stars
Mojo	4/5 stars
musicOMH	5/5 stars
NME	8/10
Pitchfork	7.0/10
PopMatters	8/10
Q	4/5 stars
Uncut	8/10

Love Travels at Illegal Speeds is the sixth solo album by Graham Coxon. It was released 13 March 2006 in the United Kingdom, the day after Coxon's 37th birthday. The album was produced by Stephen Street who also produced Coxon's previous album, Happiness in Magazines.

== Reception ==
At Metacritic, which assigns a normalised rating out of 100 to reviews from mainstream critics, Love Travels at Illegal Speeds has an average score of 81 based on 22 reviews, indicating "universal acclaim".

== Track listing ==
All tracks are written by Graham Coxon.

No.	Title	Length
1.	"Standing on My Own Again"	4:29
2.	"I Can't Look at Your Skin"	3:35
3.	""Don't Let Your Man Know""	2:54
4.	"Just a State of Mind"	4:36
5.	"You & I"	3:43
6.	"Gimme Some Love"	2:32
7.	"I Don't Wanna Go Out"	4:17
8.	"Don't Believe Anything I Say"	5:26
9.	"Tell It Like It Is"	4:02
10.	"Flights to the Sea (Lovely Rain)"	3:25
11.	"What's He Got?"	3:42
12.	"You Always Let Me Down"	2:49
13.	"See a Better Day"	5:10
Total length:		50:40

=== Bonus tracks (Japan) ===
- "Click Click Click" (b-side on the "You & I" UK CD single)
- "Livin'" (b-side on the "Standing on My Own Again" UK CD single)

=== Bonus DVD (UK) ===
- Live at Goldsmith's College 22 June 2005
1. "You Always Let Me Down"
2. "Spectacular"
3. "Girl Done Gone"
4. "Don't Let Your Man Know"
- Live at Koko 16 July 2005
1. "Standing on My Own Again"
2. "I Can't Look at Your Skin"
3. "Freakin' Out"
- Hidden track

Filmed and edited by Katie and Richard Harris

- Track by Track Interview
  - Interview by Tony Hale
  - Filmed and edited by Jai Stokes

== Release details ==
Country	Date	Label	Format	Catalog
Japan	8 March 2006	Toshiba-EMI	CD	TOCP-66525 / 4988006840171
United Kingdom	13 March 2006	Parlophone	2LP	350 5191 / 0946 3 50519 1 9
United Kingdom	13 March 2006	Parlophone	CD	350 5192 / 0946 3 50519 2 6
United Kingdom	13 March 2006	Parlophone	CD/DVD	354 1342 / 0946 3 54134 2 7
United States	14 November 2006	Parlophone	CD	0946 3 50519 2 6
