= Transcopic Records =

- Parent company: EMI
- Founded: 1998
- Founder: Graham Coxon
- Defunct: 2005
- Status: Defunct
- Distributor(s): Parlophone
- Genre: Alternative rock, indie rock, lo-fi
- Country of origin: United Kingdom
- Location: London

Transcopic was a British record label created in 1998 by Blur guitarist Graham Coxon for his solo releases, as well as those of other left field artists. Along with Coxon's music, the label issued records by acts such as Ooberman, The Buff Medways, You Am I, and Billy Childish. It was co-owned by Jamie Davis, who subsequently co-founded Ark Recordings and founded The Jaded Hearts Club .

Coxon issued his first five solo albums and their associated singles on the label between 1998 and 2005. After the closure of Transcopic, Coxon released his sixth album, Love Travels at Illegal Speeds (2006), via Parlophone.

== Selected releases ==
- Assembly Line People Program - Noise Vision 80 (TRAN001)
- Ooberman - "Sugar Bum" (TRAN002)
- Control Freaks - Agro (TRAN003)
- Assembly Line People Program - Critical Gate (TRAN004)
- Graham Coxon - The Sky is Too High (TRANCD005/TRANLP005)
- Assembly Line People Program - Subdivision of Being (TRANCD006/TRANLP006)
- Bunsen Honeydew - Didn't You Used To Be Invisible? (TRAN007)
- Graham Coxon - The Golden D (TRANCD0)
- Mower - Na (TRAN008)
- Mower - Drinking For Britain (TRANCD009/TRAN009)
- Graham Coxon - Crow Sit On Blood Tree (TRANCD010/TRANLP010)
- Graham Coxon - Thank God For The Rain/You Never Will Be (TRANCD011/TRAN011)
- The Buff Medways - A Strange Kind of Happiness (TRAN012)
- Mower - Mower (TRANCD013/TRANLP013)
- Mower - Rest in Peace (TRAN014)
- The Buff Medways - Troubled Mind / Leave My Kitten Alone (TRAN015)
- The Buff Medways - Steady The Buffs (TRAN016/TRANLP016)
- The Buff Medways - Strood Lights / You Make Me Die (TRAN017)
- Graham Coxon - The Kiss of Morning (TRANCD018/TRANLP018)
- Louis Vause - Pianophernalia (TRANCD019)
- Graham Coxon - Escape Song / Mountain of Regret (TRANCD020)
- You Am I - No After You Sir...: An Introduction to You Am I (TRANCD021)
- Mower - After Dark (TRANCD022/TRAN022)
- Mower - The Morning After (TRANCD023/TRAN023)
- Mower - People Are Cruel (TRANCD023/TRANLP023)
- The Buff Medways - Just 15 (TRAN025)
- The Buff Medways - 1914 (TRANCD026/TRANLP026)
- Neon - A Man (TRANCD027)
- Neon - Hit Me Again (TRANCD028)

== See also ==
- List of record labels
