= Graham Coxon =

English musician (born 1969)

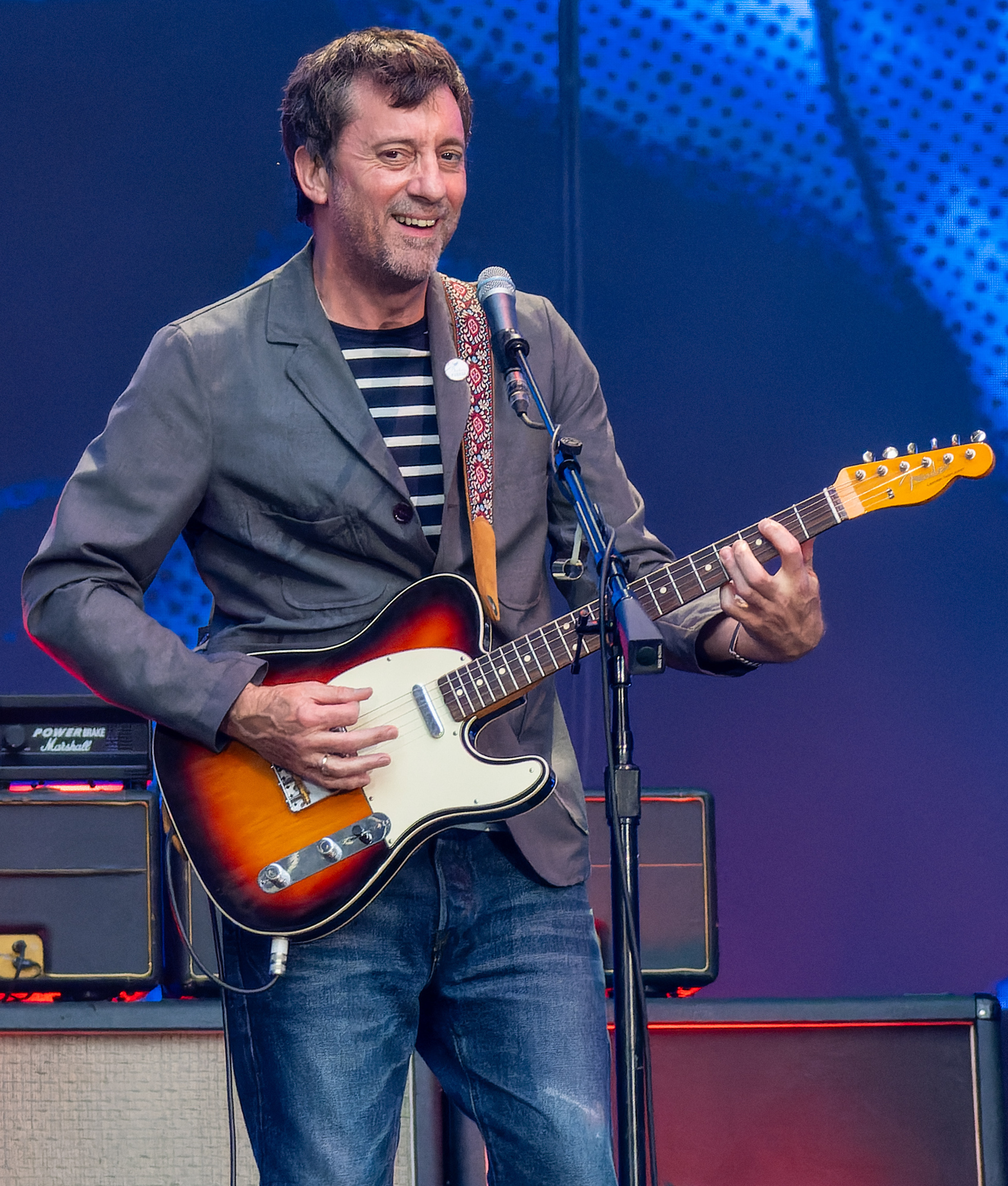
- Coxon at Wembley Stadium in 2023

Background information
- Born: Graham Leslie Coxon; 12 March 1969 (age 57); Rinteln, West Germany
- Origin: Colchester, Essex, England
- Genres: Alternative rock; indie rock; indie folk; lo-fi; Britpop; noise rock; art rock
- Occupations: Musician; songwriter; producer; painter
- Instruments: Guitar; vocals; saxophone
- Years active: 1988–present
- Labels: Transcopic; Parlophone
- Member of: Blur; The Waeve
- Formerly of: The Jaded Hearts Club
- Website: grahamcoxon.co.uk

Graham Leslie Coxon (born 12 March 1969) is an English guitarist, singer and songwriter who came to prominence as a founding member of the rock band Blur, of which he was the lead guitarist and secondary vocalist. He is also a member of The Waeve, which he formed alongside Rose Elinor Dougall in 2021.

Coxon is featured on all of Blur's studio discography (although 2003's Think Tank only features his playing on one album track and two B-side tracks due to his temporary departure from the band during recording sessions for the album). He has also led a solo career since 1998, and has released nine studio albums. As well as being a musician, Coxon is a visual artist: he designed the cover art for multiple of his solo albums as well as Blur's 13 (1999).

Coxon plays several instruments and records his albums with little assistance from session musicians. Q magazine critic Adrian Deevoy has written: "Coxon is an astonishing musician. His restless playing style – all chord slides, rapid pulloffs, mini-arpeggios and fractured runs – seems to owe more to his saxophone training than [to] any conventional guitar tuition." An innovative lead guitarist, he has been described by Noel Gallagher, lead guitarist of the band Oasis, as "one of the most talented guitarists of his generation." Coxon was voted the 15th greatest guitarist of the last 30 years in a 2010 BBC poll.

== Early life ==
Graham Leslie Coxon was born on 12 March 1969 in Rinteln, West Germany, where his father, Bob Coxon, was stationed as a clarinet player and band leader in the British Army. As a child, he moved first to Spondon, Derby, England, a period during which he became a fan of Derby County. He then moved to Colchester, Essex, England, where he grew up and met fellow Blur member Damon Albarn at The Stanway School, then known as Stanway Comprehensive, at the age of 11. At the beginning of their relationship, Coxon would play the saxophone on Albarn's original songs before playing the guitar in several small Colchester bands. He appeared on the popular BBC children's show Blue Peter twice.

== Music career ==
=== Blur ===
Coxon studied fine art at Goldsmiths College, London, for two years, where early on he met bassist Alex James. In his time there he mixed with upcoming talents such as Damien Hirst, Michael Landy, Sam Taylor-Wood, and Abigail Lane, some of the future leading lights of the Britart movement. His musical interests were heavily influenced by Pink Floyd founder Syd Barrett, whose work he had discovered by 1986.

He quit college due to the increasing success of his band at the time, Seymour, which later changed its name to Blur because the recording company, Food Records, thought Seymour was too 'student-ish'. They presented a list to the band of preferred names which included "The Shining Path" and "Blur". As well as providing all guitars, backing vocals, and occasional drums, Coxon's lo-fi and alternative musical style and tastes influenced the band's less commercial music in the late 1990s. He sang lead vocals on songs including "Red Necks", "You're So Great" from the album Blur, and "Coffee & TV", as well as a section of the chorus of "Tender", the bridge of "Lonesome Street" and a section of "Thought I Was a Spaceman" on The Magic Whip.

During the 1995 period of the media-dubbed 'Battle of Britpop', Coxon became increasingly weary and suspicious of the music industry. His behaviour was occasionally awkward, such as refusing to appear in the video for Blur song "Country House" unless he could dress as a milkman and take no part in any action with which he felt uncomfortable.

In November 2001, Coxon was admitted to the Priory Hospital for 28 days to be treated for alcoholism. During this time, Blur began the recording sessions that would produce the material for their next album, Think Tank. In February 2002, Coxon rejoined the band in the studio for the rest of the recording of Think Tank but after five days was asked by then manager Chris Morrison not to go back into the studio as the other members of the band had reported that the session was not going too well with him present. Coxon took this as a sign and left the band. As he stated in an interview in 2006, "I had a breakthrough, I think my life just became calmer, I gave up drinking. My priorities changed as I had a young daughter. The group didn't want me to record for the Think Tank album, so I took it as a sign to leave". His last contribution to Blur was a song called "Battery in Your Leg", the closing song on Blur's 2003 album Think Tank, before leaving the line-up. Damon Albarn later revealed that the song "Sweet Song" was written after he had been looking at a photograph of Coxon.

After Damon Albarn's revealing that he and Coxon had rebuilt their relationship, on 9 December 2008, Blur announced that the whole band would reunite for a show at Hyde Park on 3 July 2009. More dates were announced and the band played festival dates at Glastonbury, T in the Park and Oxegen 2009 as well as headlining shows in Manchester, Newcastle, Wolverhampton, Goldsmiths College and the East Anglian Railway Museum in Colchester. Blur also played one show in Lyon, France.

On 17 April 2010, the band released their first single since 2003, "Fool's Day", for the Record Store Day event as a 7" limited to 1,000 copies. The band released the single as a free download on their official website the next day. More recently Blur announced via the NME website that they would reunite every so often and record more singles, preferably on 7 inch. However, Damon also stated that an album was not on its way as they were all too busy with their own individual projects.

On 19 February 2015, Coxon and the band announced on social media that they would be releasing their eighth studio album on 27 April, titled The Magic Whip, Blur's first album in 12 years and first in 16 years in their original lineup.

After eight years, the band released their ninth studio album, The Ballad of Darren. The band went on an international tour, during which they performed in various festivals, including Coachella, and two sold-out concerts at Wembley Stadium. On 19th July 2024 the band released a documentary about their latest reunion and tour, blur: To The End.

=== Solo work ===
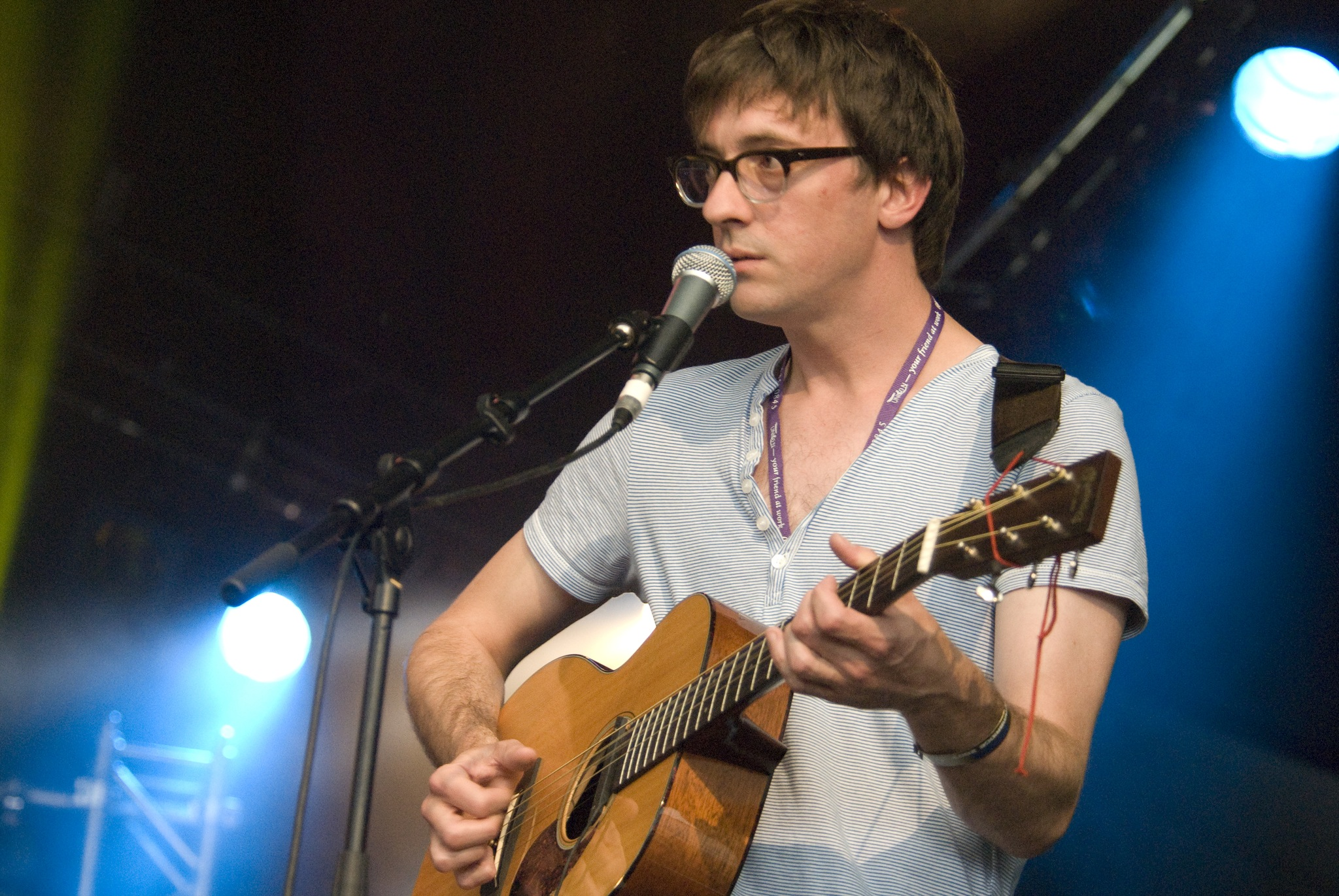
Coxon performing in 2007

Coxon had already released three solo albums while a member of Blur before his 2002 departure. His first, The Sky Is Too High was released on his own Transcopic label in 1998. This was followed by The Golden D in 2000 and Crow Sit on Blood Tree in 2001. After going solo full-time, he released The Kiss of Morning in 2002. The album was promoted with the single "Escape Song". In 2004, Coxon released his fifth solo album Happiness in Magazines, produced by ex-Blur and The Smiths producer Stephen Street. This proved to be his most successful album to date, and he received the NME Award for Best Solo Artist in 2005.

In March 2006 he released his sixth solo album, called Love Travels at Illegal Speeds, again produced by Stephen Street. It marked Coxon's first album away from his now-defunct indie label 'Transcopic'. The LP was preceded by the singles "Standing on My Own Again" on 27 February and "You & I". Coxon embarked on a tour of the UK, starting at Newcastle University. He was also involved in a single supporting the England national football team at the 2006 FIFA World Cup. The song was a re-working of the Sham 69 hit "Hurry Up Harry", and was released as "Sham 69 and The Special Assembly" (as well as Coxon and Sham 69, Virgin Radio DJ Christian O'Connell, who had run a competition on his show to find a band to record a song in support of the team, was involved in the recording of the song). "Hurry Up England" entered the UK Singles Chart at No. 10.

In October 2006, Coxon released a double live album Burnt to Bitz: At the Astoria immediately after his sold-out London Astoria show. The album features 27 songs, with at least one song from each of his albums. In July 2007 Coxon released a single with Paul Weller, called "This Old Town". The single peaked at No. 39 in the UK Singles Chart.

Coxon's seventh 15-track studio album titled The Spinning Top, produced again by Stephen Street, was released on 11 May 2009. Coxon stated that the LP, which is primarily acoustic, followed a narrative – the story of a man from birth to death. "The album is mainly an acoustic journey although there is, of course, some explosive electric guitar action," he explained. "There are some guests too! Robyn Hitchcock supplies some counter-attack guitar, Jas Singh plays dilruba and jori with his friends Gurjit Sembhi on taus and Jaskase Singh on esraj. Danny Thompson plays the legendary Victoria, Graham Fox gives plenty of swing on the drums and sizzle cymbals and Louis Vause tinkles the ivories." Pre-release response had been positive, with Monday Field of Frank Booth Review dubbing the album "a staggering artistic achievement, and Coxon's best solo release to date."

His eighth solo album A+E was released in April 2012.

Coxon wrote and recorded the score for the 2017 Channel 4 / Netflix television series The End of the F***ing World; it was his first original score. The soundtrack was released in January 2018. In September of the same year, Coxon embarked on a solo tour in North America that featured some of the songs from his score.

Later he co-composed an original score for the 2019 comedy-drama film Fighting with My Family with Vik Sharma.

In February 2020, Coxon released an album for the fictional band Bloodwitch, to be a part of the soundtrack of the Netflix series I Am Not Okay with This, featuring singer Tatyana Richaud.

In 2021, Coxon published Superstate, a graphic novel accompanied by a studio album of the same name, bringing the concept of a dystopian futuristic universe. The cover art, much like most of his solo works, was illustrated by himself.

Following in 2023, the folk rock band the Waeve, consisting of Graham Coxon and Rose Elinor Dougall as members, released their debut self-titled album, with an England-wide tour. The duo released their second album, called City Lights, in September 2024.

In April 2026, Coxon announced his ninth solo album Castle Park, named after Castle Park, Colchester. The tracks in the album were recorded in 2011, as part of the sessions for A+E, but never released. The lead single "Billy Says" was released on 20 April. The album was released on 19 June.

=== Transcopic and other contributions ===
Coxon's independent label, Transcopic, was co-managed with his friend, and then business partner, Jamie Davis. Davis now runs Independent label Ark Recordings. Coxon illustrated and designed all of his own album art, and collaborated with his friend Nick Craske creating abstract digital work for the release of The Spinning Top; they also filmed two music videos, "Sorrow's Army" and "'In The Morning". Coxon also continued painting a series of personal work, most of which remained unseen until 2004, when he exhibited at the ICA in London.

Coxon has also been involved in remixing other peoples tracks, including Idlewild and Lowgold both of which were released as B-sides and the latter remix was later re-released on the band's anthology release Keep Music Miserable.

In September 2006, Coxon revealed a musical soundscape, "english shoes squeek," created especially for "Verheaven" an exhibition at London's Riflemaker Gallery of the work of artist Julie Verhoeven.

Coxon appeared on John McCusker's Under One Sky, providing the song "All Has Gone".

In 2009, Coxon played on all but one track of the Pete Doherty solo album Grace/Wastelands. Doherty lived with Coxon to work on the album, which was released 24 March 2009.

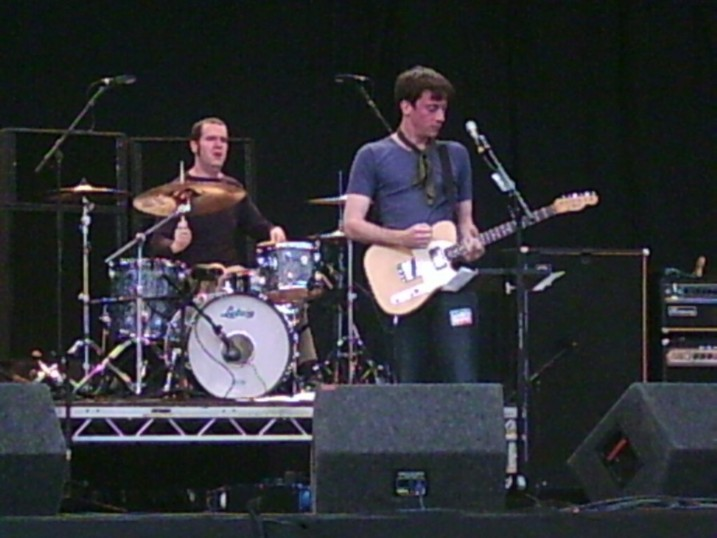
Coxon at the 2005 Leeds Festival

Coxon has also produced albums by Mower and Assembly Line People Programme from his Transcopic label.

In 2013, Coxon was involved in a musical project where artists re-recorded the classic Beatles album Please Please Me. He recorded the song "Baby It's You" live as part of a 10-hour recording session hosted by BBC Radio 2 to mark the 50th anniversary of a challenge set by recording company EMI to The Beatles to record a whole studio album in one session.

In February 2019, Coxon became involved with the writing process of the Duran Duran album Future Past, which reached No.3 on the UK Album Charts and No.1 on the UK Independent charts. He told the UK Independent Newspaper that Duran Duran are "All really nice and they're not, as individuals, dissimilar to Blur." Coxon performed with Duran Duran at the 2021 Billboard Awards Show.

In 2020, Coxon featured on Bastille’s song "What You Gonna Do???", the lead single from their EP, Goosebumps.

In 2025, Coxon contributed both vocals and guitar on two songs (Fun People and Ad Astra) on Ash's Ad Astra album. He performed with folk musicians Jon Wilks and Eliza Carthy at the Life & Songs of Martin Carthy tribute concert in London. He later recorded a version of “Scarborough Fair” with Wilks at Green Note in Camden.

== Instruments and equipment ==
Coxon has primarily used Fender Telecasters throughout his career, particularly a 1952 reissue and a customised 1968 model with a Gibson PAF humbucker in the neck position, the latter was reissued by Fender as the Graham Coxon signature model although with some minor changes. Since the Blur reunion in 2009 he almost exclusively used a vintage Telecaster Deluxe. During the Leisure era Coxon also used Gibson Les Pauls and a Fender Jaguar, whilst on some later songs, such as No Distance Left to Run and This Is a Low, Coxon uses a Gibson ES-335. He has occasionally used a heavily modified Fender Musicmaster which can be seen in the Coffee & TV and Beetlebum videos. Coxon plays all the instruments featured in his solo work, and has used a variety of guitars, notably Gibson SGs, and a Burns London Sonic. He has been recently seen playing a Telecaster Custom.

Graham recently received a custom-made guitar from Gray Guitars; it is a Telecaster-type instrument and features a semi-acoustic body and P90 style pickups.

Coxon's playing makes significant use of effects pedals such as distortion, delay (a significant example being "Essex Dogs") and flange (as heard in the pre-chorus of "Girls & Boys"). He uses a custom made Mike Hill pedalboard which over the years has included: Akai Headrush E2, Boss BF-2 Flanger, Boss CS-3 Compressor/Sustainer, Boss DD-3 Digital Delay, Boss DM-2 Analogue Delay, Boss OD-3, Boss NS-2 Noise Suppressor, Boss PN-2 Tremolo/Pan, Boss RV-5 Digital Reverb, Boss TR-2 Tremolo, Boss TU-2 Tuner, Boss VB-2 Vibrato, DOD Punkifier, Electro-Harmonix HOG, Electro-Harmonix Holy Grail, Line 6 FM4 Filter Modeller, ProCo RAT, Shin-Ei FY-2 Companion Fuzz, T-Rex Mudhoney Distortion.

For amplification, he uses two Marshall 1959 SLP heads going in to individual 1968 4x12 cabinets.

A detailed gear diagram of Graham Coxon's 1993 Blur guitar rig is well-documented.

== Other artistic endeavours ==
Coxon is a visual artist and designs all his album sleeves. He has also designed album sleeves for other artists. In July 2006, he wrote and had published a foreword for a new edition of Hermann Hesse's Narcissus and Goldmund novel. His work also featured on the cover of English folk singer Kate Rusby's album The Girl Who Couldn't Fly.

In October 2022 his memoir Verse, Chorus, Monster! was published by Faber and Faber.

== Personal life ==
During a celebratory event for Blur's "Battle of Britpop" victory in 1995, Coxon considered suicide by jumping out of a sixth-storey window, but was talked out of it by Damon Albarn. Coxon became a teetotaller as a recovering alcoholic.

In the 2001 UK general election, Coxon supported the Green Party candidate for Holborn and St Pancras, Robert Whitley.

In 2007, a woman who had been stalking Coxon was cautioned by the police for harassment and criminal damage.

Coxon is in a relationship with his The Waeve collaborator Rose Elinor Dougall, with whom he has a daughter. Coxon also has two other daughters from two previous relationships.

In a 2018 interview, Coxon said he was vegan.

In October 2024, it was reported that Coxon was involved in a divorce case that had reached England's High Court.

== Discography ==
=== Studio albums ===
- The Sky Is Too High (1998)
- The Golden D (2000)
- Crow Sit on Blood Tree (2001)
- The Kiss of Morning (2002)
- Happiness in Magazines (2004)
- Love Travels at Illegal Speeds (2006)
- The Spinning Top (2009)
- A+E (2012)
- Castle Park (2026)

=== Soundtrack albums ===
- The End of the F***ing World (Original Songs And Score) (2018)
- The End of the F***ing World 2 (Original Songs And Score) (2019)
- I Am Not Okay with This (as Bloodwitch) (Music from the Netflix Original Series) (2020)

=== Superstate ===
- Superstate (2021, in association with Z2 Comics)

=== As session musician ===
With Ed Harcourt

- The Beautiful Lie (2006) — Guitar on "Visit from the Dead Dog"

With Paul Weller

- 22 Dreams (2008) — Drums on "Black River"

With John McCusker

- Under One Sky (2009) — Vocals on "All Has Gone"

With Pete Doherty

- Grace/Wastelands (2009) — Guitar on tracks 1-9 and 11-12

With Gorillaz

- Humanz (2017) — Guitar on "Submission"
- The Now Now (2018) — Guitar on "Magic City"

With That Dog

- Old LP (2019) — Guitar on "Never Want to See Your Face Again"

With Duran Duran

- Future Past (2021) — Guitars

With Ash

- Ad Astra (2025) — Guitar and vocals on "Fun People" and "Ad Astra"
