= Album =

Collection of audio recordings

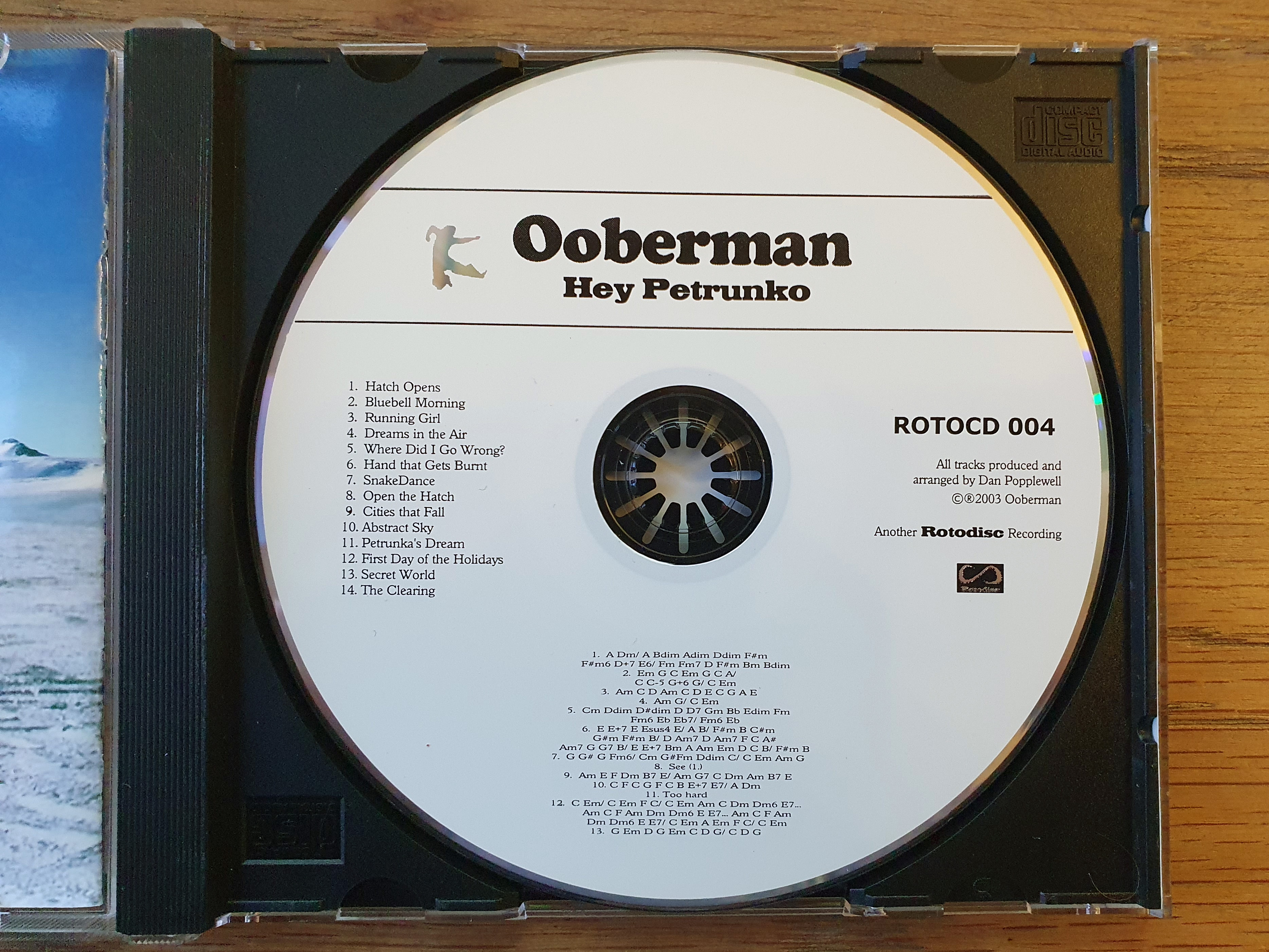
Albums c. 2000 came on compact discs stored in jewel cases (pictured is Hey Petrunko by Ooberman).

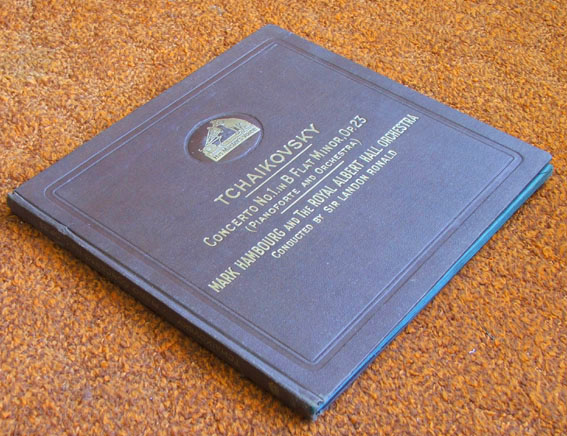
Early record albums from the first half of the 20th century resembled photo albums, being packaged in book form on multiple 78 rpm records.

An album is a collection of audio recordings (e.g., music) issued on a medium such as compact disc (CD), vinyl (record), or audio tape (like 8-track or cassette), or in digital format.

The album was the dominant format or unit of recorded music expression and consumption from the mid-1960s through to the early 21st century, a period that has been described in the industry as the album era. Vinyl LPs are still issued for certain album releases, though album sales in the 21st-century have been predominantly in CD and then downloadable (e.g. MP3) and streaming digital formats. The 8-track tape was the first tape format, widely used alongside vinyl, from 1965 until being phased out by 1983—it was gradually supplanted by the cassette tape over the 1970s and early 1980s. The popularity of the cassette reached its peak during the late 1980s before declining sharply during the 1990s as it yielded market share to compact disc formats. In the early 2000s, sales of CDs—which also typically contained around 45-60 minutes (or 'an album') of music—became the primary distribution mechanism for recorded music, until the rise in the 2010s of digital, whereby albums could be downloaded and then streamed through 'streaming services' or 'platforms' such as Spotify. An enormous variety of albums are now more widely (often globally) available, and listening to an album has been made cheaper, more convenient and more popular, through such services.

Most albums are recorded in a recording studio, making them studio albums, although they may also be recorded at a concert venue, at home, in the field, or in a mix of these and other places. The total time to record an album varies between a few hours and several years. Recording usually requires several takes of each track, each component piece of the album: in each track, different parts may be recorded separately, and then brought or "mixed" together. Recordings that are done in one take without overdubbing are termed "live", even when done in a studio. Studios are built to absorb sound, eliminating reverberation, to assist in mixing different takes; other locations, such as concert venues and some "live rooms", have more reverberation, which creates a "live" sound. Recordings, including live, when published may contain editing, sound effects, voice adjustments, and other manipulations of the sound that was initially recorded. With modern recording technology, including multitrack recording, various artists collaborating on a track or album can be recorded in separate rooms or at separate times, perhaps while listening through headphones to certain other parts recorded earlier.

Album covers and liner notes may accompany an album, the latter of these conveying additional information, such as song lyrics, biographical information on artists, analysis of the recording, or librettos in the case of classical music and opera recordings.

Historically, the term "album" was applied to a collection of various items housed in a book or photo album format. In musical usage, the word was used for collections of short pieces of printed music from the early nineteenth century. 'Albums' of recorded sounds were first developed for recorded music in the early 20th century: individual 78 rpm records (78s), each side of which could contain some 3 minutes of sound (enough for a song, piece, or 'track') were physically collected together and sold in a bound book resembling a photo album. This format evolved after 1948 into vinyl long-playing (LP) records played at 33 1/3 rpm; these contained some 22 minutes of sound per side, giving an approximate 45 minutes of music per LP record. When these LPs were introduced, a collection of pieces or songs on a single record was called an "album"; the word was extended to other recording media such as compact disc, MiniDisc, compact audio cassette, 8-track tape and digital albums as they were introduced. An album would typically have more tracks than an extended play (EP) record, which might contain only a 'single' (a single track released on its own), or two or three songs released together.

== History ==
An album (Latin albus, white), in ancient Rome, was a board chalked or painted white, on which decrees, edicts, and other public notices were inscribed in black. It was from this that in medieval and modern times, album came to denote a book of blank pages in which verses, autographs, sketches, photographs and the like are collected.

In the early nineteenth century, "album" was occasionally used in the titles of some classical music sets, such as Robert Schumann's Album for the Young, Op 68, a set of 43 short pieces.

With the advent of 78 rpm records in the early 1900s, the typical 10-inch disc could hold only about three minutes of sound per side, so almost all popular recordings were limited to around three minutes in length. Classical-music and spoken-word items generally were released on the longer 12-inch 78s, playing around 4–5 minutes per side. For example, in 1924, George Gershwin recorded a drastically shortened version of his new seventeen-minute composition Rhapsody in Blue with Paul Whiteman and His Orchestra. The recording was issued on both sides of a single record, Victor 55225 and ran for 8m 59s.

By about 1910, bound collections of empty sleeves with a paperboard or leather cover, similar to a photograph album, were sold as record albums that customers could use to store their records (the term "record album" was printed on some covers). These albums came in both 10-inch and 12-inch sizes. The covers of these bound books were wider and taller than the records inside, allowing the record album to be placed on a shelf upright, like a book, suspending the fragile records above the shelf and protecting them. In the 1930s, record companies began issuing collections of 78s by one performer or of one type of music in specially assembled albums, typically with artwork on the front cover and liner notes on the back or inside cover. Most albums included three or four records, with two sides each, making six or eight compositions per album.

By the mid-1930s, record companies had adopted the album format for classical music selections that were longer than the roughly eight minutes that fit on both sides of a classical 12" 78 rpm record. Initially the covers were plain, with the name of the selection and performer in small type. In 1938, Columbia Records hired the first graphic designer in the business to design covers, others soon followed and colorful album covers became an important selling feature.

The 10-inch and 12-inch LP record (long play), or 33 1/3 rpm microgroove vinyl record, is a gramophone record format introduced by Columbia Records in 1948. A single LP record often had the same or similar number of tunes as a typical album of 78s, and it was adopted by the record industry as a standard format for the "album". When Columbia introduced the Long Playing record format in 1948, it was natural the term album would continue. Columbia expected that the record size distinction in 78s would continue, with classical music on 12" records and popular music on 10" records, and singles on 78s. Columbia's first popular 10" LP in fact was Frank Sinatra's first album, the four-record eight-song The Voice of Frank Sinatra, originally issued in 1946.

RCA's introduction of the smaller 45 rpm format later in 1948 disrupted Columbia's expectations. By the mid-1950s, 45s dominated the singles market and 12" LPs dominated the album market and both 78s and 10" LPs were discontinued. In the 1950s albums of popular music were also issued on 45s, sold in small heavy paper-covered "gate-fold" albums with multiple discs in sleeves or in sleeves in small boxes. This format disappeared around 1960. Sinatra's "The Voice" was issued in 1952 on two extended play 45s, with two songs on each side, in both packagings.

The term "album" was extended to other recording media such as 8-track tape, cassette tape, compact disc, MiniDisc, and digital albums, as they were introduced. As part of a trend of shifting sales in the music industry, some observers feel that the early 21st century experienced the death of the album.

== Length ==
An average length of an album is roughly 40 to 80 minutes and varies between various music genres and artists; a typical rock-adjacent album is around 40 minutes, while electronic and hip-hop albums are generally on the longer side. Historically, 40 minutes was the average album length in the vinyl era, as a regular 12-inch LP record could hold up to around 23 minutes of audio on each side, combining to 46 minutes total, though the viable limit has been pushed to 52 minutes in 1960s. Unusual records with longer playtimes were also achieved, such as Todd Rundgren's Initiation at 68 minutes, though the quality of such records typically suffers as a result. The average album length increased considerably in the 1990s, largely due to the proliferation of CDs which can hold up to 80 minutes of audio, almost double that of vinyls, as well as the growing electronic and hip-hop scene, which took advantage of the longer playing times. Since the 2010s, the increasing prevalence of digital media allowed the album's length to not be limited by the physical format, though the average length continued to be around 40 to 80 minutes due to the established length range being standardized as well as the revival of physical media.

An album may contain any number of tracks. In the United States, The Recording Academy's rules for Grammy Awards state that an album must comprise a minimum total playing time of 15 minutes with at least five distinct tracks or a minimum total playing time of 30 minutes with no minimum track requirement. In the United Kingdom, the criteria for the UK Albums Chart is that a recording counts as an "album" if it either has more than four tracks or lasts more than 25 minutes. Sometimes shorter albums are referred to as mini-albums or EPs. Albums such as Tubular Bells, Amarok, and Hergest Ridge by Mike Oldfield, and Yes's Close to the Edge, include fewer than four tracks, but still surpass the 25-minute mark. The album Dopesmoker by Sleep contains only a single track, but the composition is over 63 minutes long. There are no formal rules against artists such as Pinhead Gunpowder referring to their own releases under thirty minutes as "albums".

If an album becomes too long to fit onto a single vinyl record or CD, it may be released as a double album where two vinyl LPs or compact discs are packaged together in a single case, or a triple album containing three LPs or compact discs. Recording artists who have an extensive back catalogue may re-release several CDs in one single box with a unified design, often containing one or more albums (in this scenario, these releases can sometimes be referred to as a "two (or three)-fer"), or a compilation of previously unreleased recordings. These are known as box sets. Some musical artists have also released more than three compact discs or LP records of new recordings at once, in the form of boxed sets, although in that case the work is still usually considered to be an album.

== Tracks ==
Material (music or sounds) is stored on an album in sections termed tracks. A music track (often simply referred to as a track) is an individual song or instrumental recording. The term is particularly associated with popular music where separate tracks are known as album tracks; the term is also used for other formats such as EPs and singles. When vinyl records were the primary medium for audio recordings a track could be identified visually from the grooves and many album covers or sleeves included numbers for the tracks on each side. On a compact disc the track number is indexed so that a player can jump straight to the start of any track. On digital music stores such as iTunes the term song is often used interchangeably with track regardless of whether there is any vocal content.

A track that has the same name as the album is called the title track. In the Korean music industry, the title track is used to refer to any song that has been promoted, such as a single, regardless of its title.

=== Bonus tracks ===
A bonus track (also known as a bonus cut or bonus) is a piece of music which has been included as an extra. This may be done as a marketing promotion or for other reasons. It is not uncommon to include singles, B-sides, live recordings, and demo recordings as bonus tracks on reissues of old albums, where those tracks were not originally included. Online music stores allow buyers to create their own albums by selecting songs themselves; bonus tracks may be included if a customer buys a whole album rather than just one or two songs from the artist. The song is not necessarily free, nor is it available as a stand-alone download, adding to the incentive to buy the complete album. In contrast to hidden tracks, bonus tracks are included on track listings and usually do not have a gap of silence between other album tracks. Bonus tracks on CD or vinyl albums are common in Japan for releases by European and North American artists; since importing international copies of the album can be cheaper than buying a domestically released version, Japanese releases often feature bonus tracks to incentivize domestic purchase.

== Audio formats ==
=== Non-audio printed format ===
Commercial sheet music is published in conjunction with the release of a new album (studio, compilation, soundtrack, etc.). A matching folio songbook is a compilation of the music notation of all the songs included in that particular album. It typically has the album's artwork on its cover and, in addition to sheet music, it includes photos of the artist. Most pop and rock releases come in standard Piano/Vocal/Guitar notation format (and occasionally Easy Piano / E-Z Play Today). Rock-oriented releases may also come in Guitar Recorded Versions edition, which are note-for-note transcriptions written directly from artist recordings.

=== Vinyl records ===
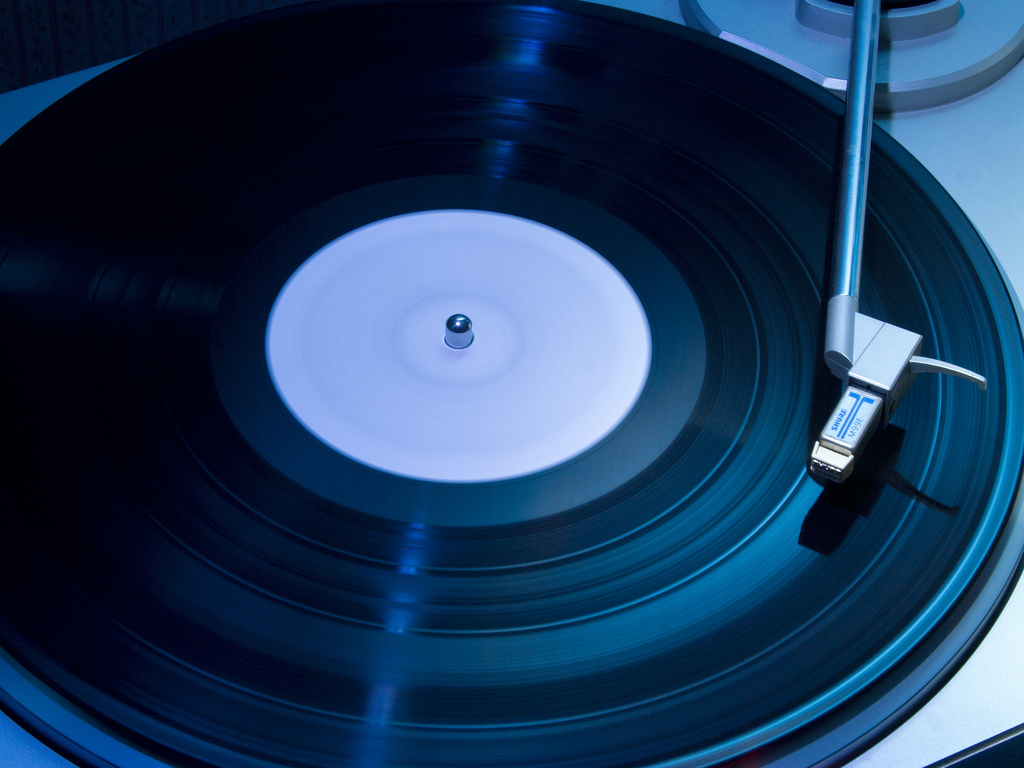
A vinyl LP on a turntable

Vinyl LP records have two sides, each comprising one-half of the album. If a pop or rock album contained tracks released separately as commercial singles, they were conventionally placed in particular positions on the album. During the sixties, particularly in the UK, singles were generally released separately from albums. Today, many commercial albums of music tracks feature one or more singles, which are released separately to radio, TV or the Internet as a way of promoting the album. Albums have been issued that are compilations of older tracks not originally released together, such as singles not originally found on albums, A-sides of singles, or unfinished "demo" recordings.

Double albums during the seventies were sometimes sequenced for record changers. In the case of a two-record set, for example, sides 1 and 4 would be stamped on one record, and sides 2 and 3 on the other. The user would stack the two records onto the spindle of an automatic record changer, with side 1 on the bottom and side 2 (on the other record) on top. Side 1 would automatically drop onto the turntable and be played. When finished, the tone arm's position would trigger a mechanism which moved the arm out of the way, dropped the record with side 2, and played it. When both records had been played, the user would pick up the stack, turn it over, and put them back on the spindle—sides 3 and 4 would then play in sequence. Record changers were used for many years of the LP era, but eventually fell out of use.

=== 8-track tape ===
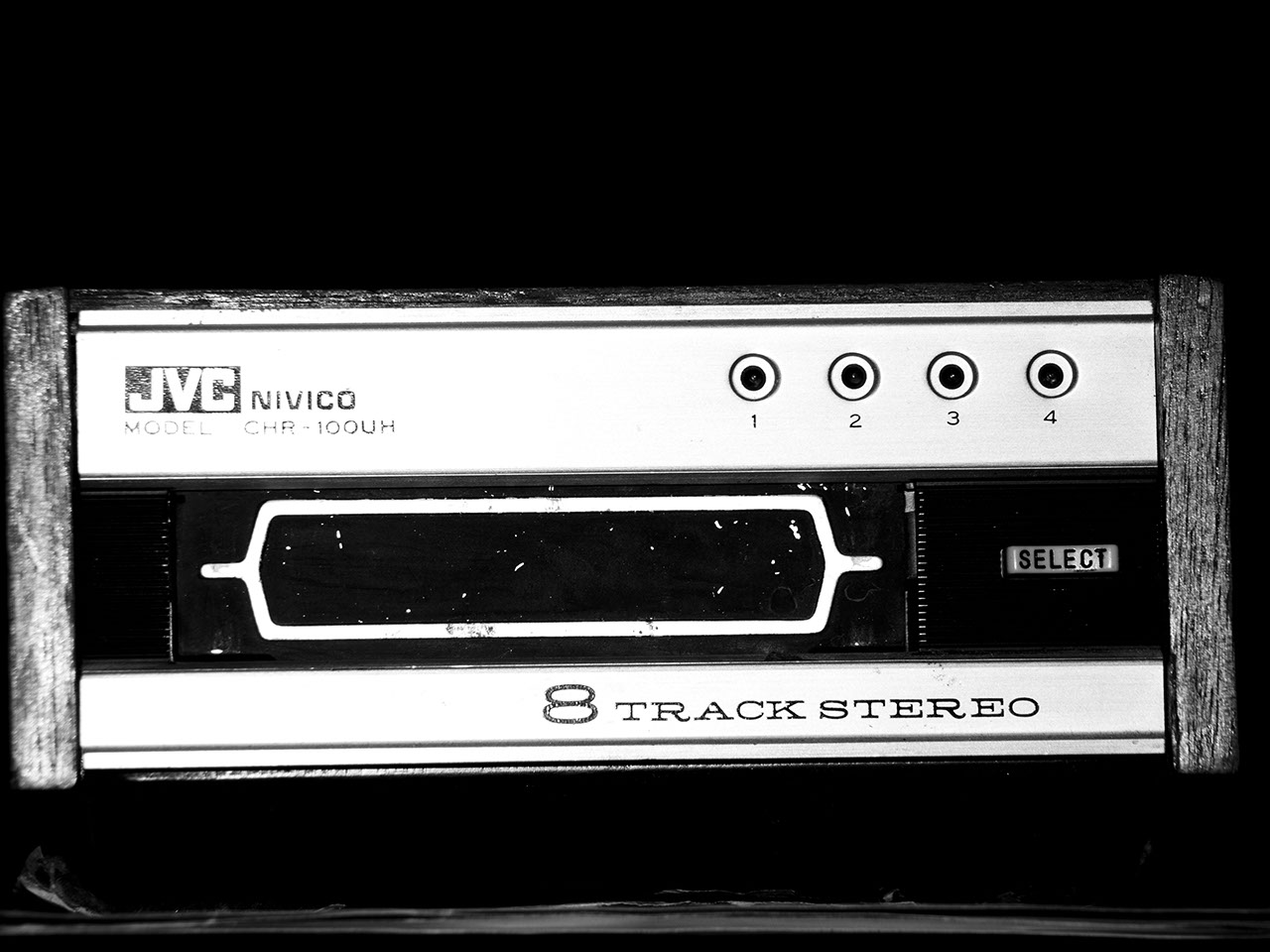
A typical 8-track tape player

8-track tape (formally Stereo 8: commonly known as the eight-track cartridge, eight-track tape, or simply eight-track) is a magnetic tape sound recording technology popular in the United States from the mid-1960s to the late 1970s when the Compact Cassette format took over. The format is regarded as an obsolete technology, and was relatively unknown outside the United States, the United Kingdom, Canada and Australia.

Stereo 8 was created in 1964 by a consortium led by Bill Lear of Lear Jet Corporation, along with Ampex, Ford Motor Company, General Motors, Motorola, and RCA Victor Records. It was a further development of the similar Stereo-Pak four-track cartridge created by Earl "Madman" Muntz. A later quadraphonic version of the format was announced by RCA in April 1970 and first known as Quad-8, then later changed to just Q8.

=== Compact cassette ===
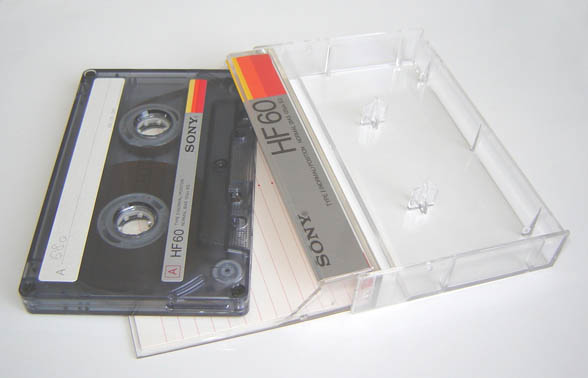
A blank compact cassette tape and case

The Compact Cassette was a popular medium for distributing pre-recorded music from the early 1970s to the early 2000s. The first "Compact Cassette" was introduced by Philips in August 1963 in the form of a prototype. Compact Cassettes became especially popular during the 1980s after the advent of the Sony Walkman, which allowed the person to control what they listened to. The Walkman was convenient because of its size, the device could fit in most pockets and often came equipped with a clip for belts or pants.

The compact cassette used double-sided magnetic tape to distribute music for commercial sale. The music is recorded on both the "A" and "B" side of the tape, with cassette being "turned" to play the other side of the album. Compact Cassettes were also a popular way for musicians to record "Demos" or "Demo Tapes" of their music to distribute to various record labels, in the hopes of acquiring a recording contract.

Compact cassettes also saw the creation of mixtapes, which are tapes containing a compilation of songs created by any average listener of music. The songs on a mixtape generally relate to one another in some way, whether it be a conceptual theme or an overall sound. After the introduction of Compact discs, the term "Mixtape" began to apply to any personal compilation of songs on any given format.

The sales of Compact Cassettes eventually began to decline in the 1990s, after the release and distribution Compact Discs. The 2010s saw a revival of Compact Cassettes by independent record labels and DIY musicians who preferred the format because of its difficulty to share over the Internet.

=== Compact disc ===
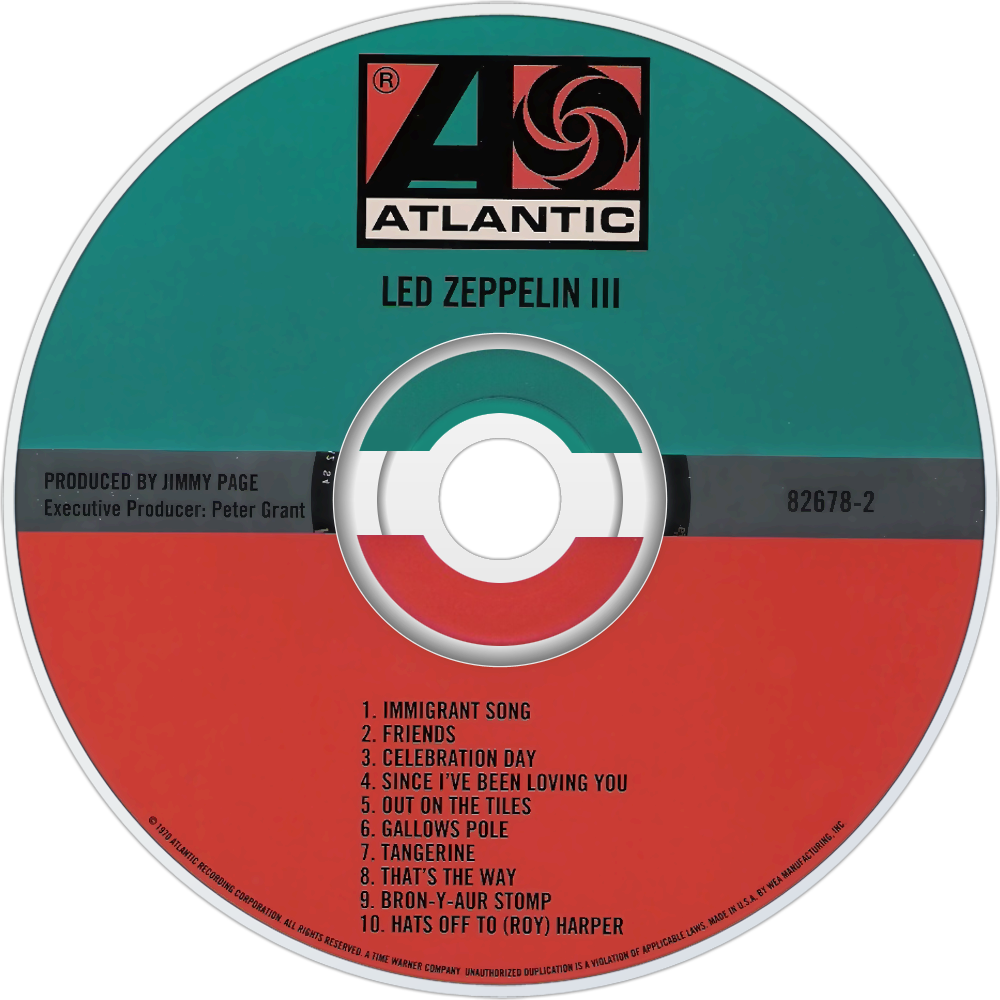
The ten-track compact disc studio album Led Zeppelin III

The compact disc format replaced both the vinyl record and the cassette as the standard for the commercial mass-market distribution of physical music albums. After the introduction of music downloading and MP3 players such as the iPod, US album sales dropped 54.6% from 2001 to 2009. The CD is a digital data storage device which permits digital recording technology to be used to record and play-back the recorded music.

=== MP3 albums, and similar ===
Most recently, the MP3 audio format has matured, revolutionizing the concept of digital storage. Early MP3 albums were essentially CD-rips created by early CD-ripping software, and sometimes real-time rips from cassettes and vinyl.

The so-called "MP3 album" is not necessarily just in MP3 file format, in which higher quality formats such as FLAC and WAV can be used on storage media that MP3 albums reside on, such as CD-R-ROMs, hard drives, flash memory (e.g. thumbdrives, MP3 players, SD cards), etc.

== Types of album ==
The contents of the album are usually recorded in a studio or live in concert, though may be recorded in other locations, such as at home (as with JJ Cale's Okie, Beck's Odelay, David Gray's White Ladder, and others), in the field—as with early blues recordings, in prison, or with a mobile recording unit such as the Rolling Stones Mobile Studio.

=== Studio ===
Most albums are studio albums—that is, they are recorded in a recording studio with equipment meant to give those overseeing the recording as much control as possible over the sound of the album. They minimize external noises and reverberations and have highly sensitive microphones and sound mixing equipment. Band members may record their parts in separate rooms or at separate times, listening to the other parts of the track with headphones to keep the timing right. In the 2000s, with the advent of digital recording, it became possible for musicians to record their part of a song in another studio in another part of the world, and send their contribution digitally to be included in the final product.

=== Live ===
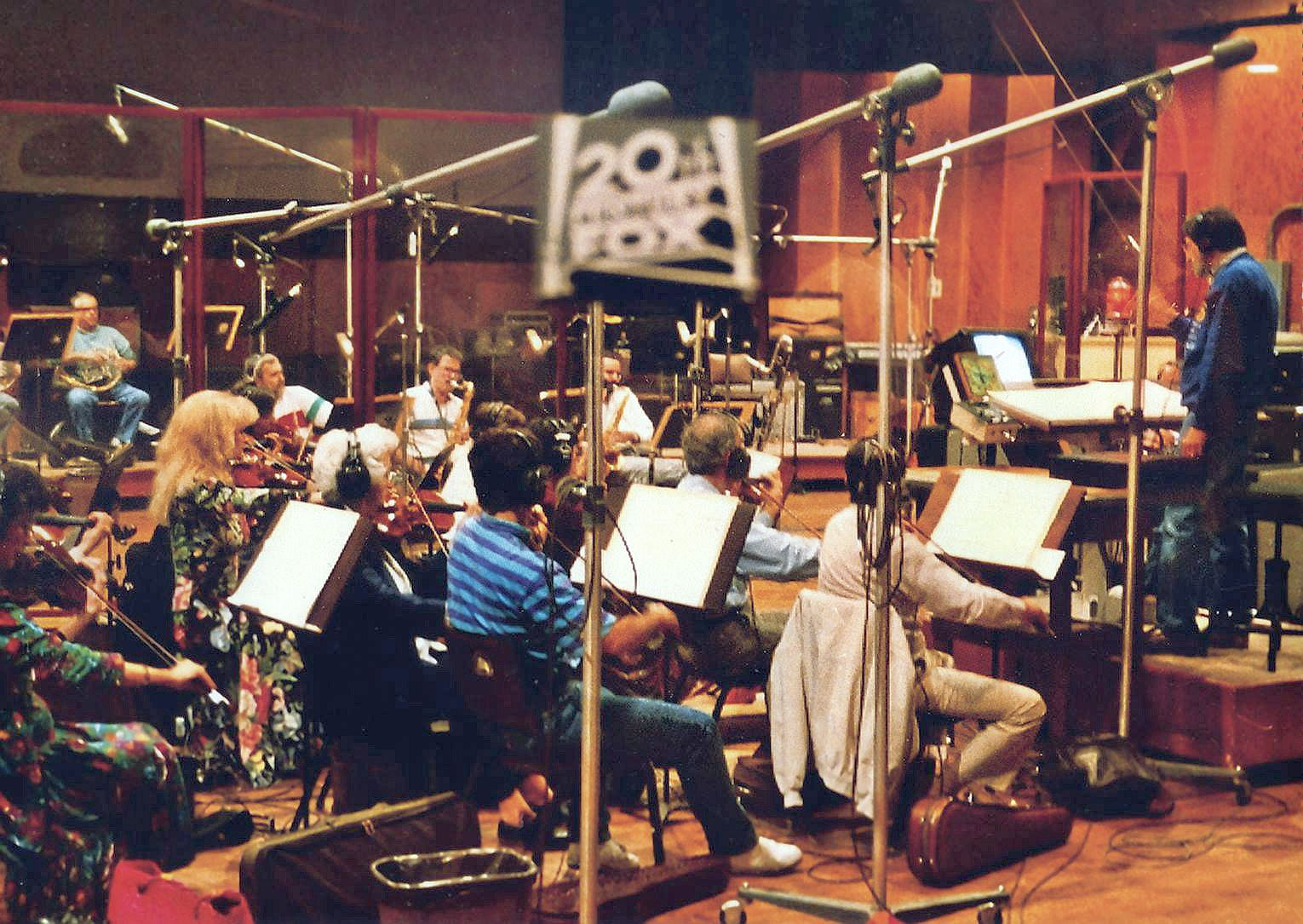
An orchestra recorded "live" in the studio

Recordings that are done in one, 'straight-through' take without overdubbing or multi-tracking are termed "live", even when done in a studio. However, the common understanding of a live album is one that was recorded at a concert with a public audience, even when the recording is overdubbed or multi-tracked. To help differentiate between the two categories, the descriptor "live-to-tape" is often used.

Concert or stage performances are recorded using remote recording techniques. Albums may be recorded at a single concert, or combine recordings made at multiple concerts. They may include applause, laughter and other noise from the audience, comments by the performers between pieces, improvisation, and so on. They may use multitrack recording direct from the stage sound system (rather than microphones placed among the audience), and can employ additional manipulation and effects during post-production to enhance the quality of the recording.

Notable early live albums include the double album of Benny Goodman, The Famous 1938 Carnegie Hall Jazz Concert, released in 1950. Live double albums later became popular during the 1970s. Appraising the concept in Christgau's Record Guide: Rock Albums of the Seventies (1981), Robert Christgau said most "are profit-taking recaps marred by sound and format inappropriate to phonographic reproduction (you can't put sights, smells, or fellowship on audio tape). But for Joe Cocker and Bette Midler and Bob-Dylan-in-the-arena, the form makes a compelling kind of sense."

Among the best selling live albums are Eric Clapton's Unplugged (1992), selling over 26 million copies, Garth Brooks' Double Live (1998), over 21 million copies, and Peter Frampton's Frampton Comes Alive! (1976), over 11 million copies.

=== Solo ===
A solo album, in popular music, is an album recorded by a current or former member of a musical group which is released under that artist's name only, even though some or all other band members may be involved. The solo album appeared as early as the late 1940s. A 1947 Billboard magazine article heralded "Margaret Whiting huddling with Capitol execs over her first solo album on which she will be backed by Frank De Vol". There is no formal definition setting forth the amount of participation a band member can solicit from other members of their band, and still have the album referred to as a solo album. One reviewer wrote that Ringo Starr's third venture, Ringo, "[t]echnically... wasn't a solo album because all four Beatles appeared on it". Three of the four members of the Beatles released solo albums while the group was officially still together.

A performer may record a solo album for several reasons. A solo performer working with other members will typically have full creative control of the band, be able to hire and fire accompanists, and get the majority of the proceeds. The performer may be able to produce songs that differ widely from the sound of the band with which the performer has been associated, or that the group as a whole chose not to include in its own albums. Graham Nash of the Hollies described his experience in developing a solo album as follows: "The thing that I go through that results in a solo album is an interesting process of collecting songs that can't be done, for whatever reason, by a lot of people". A solo album may also represent the departure of the performer from the group.

=== Compilation album ===
A compilation album is a collection of material from various recording projects or various artists, assembled with a theme such as the "greatest hits" from one artist, B-sides and rarities by one artist, or selections from a record label, a musical genre, a certain time period, or a regional music scene. Promotional sampler albums are compilations.

==== Tribute or cover ====
A tribute or cover album is a compilation of cover versions of songs or instrumental compositions. Its concept may involve various artists covering the songs of a single artist, genre or period, a single artist covering the songs of various artists or a single artist, genre or period, or any variation of an album of cover songs which is marketed as a "tribute".

=== Posthumous album ===
A posthumous album is an album released after an artist's death. These albums are often compilation albums, which sometimes feature unreleased music by the deceased artists. However, posthumous albums can also be studio albums, live albums or solo albums that primarily contain previously unreleased material.

Album releases that are posthumous which include new music often have mixed reviews (i.e., aside from Greatest Hits compilations). Opinions on the merits of releasing music by an artist posthumously vary at large, with some views expressing support to the idea that listeners would want to hear unpublished catalogues from an artist, in particular if the artist's estate and family are directly involved in assuring the artist's vision. Opposite to this, other views reflect the idea that such releases are likely without consent by the artists who have died, and as a product of this, posthumous releases could never meet the visions of artists themselves, thereby possibly negatively affecting the perceived musicality and overall legacy of the artists. Examples of successful posthumous album releases include Nirvana's 1994 first live album, MTV Unplugged in New York, the Notorious B.I.G.'s 1997 Life After Death (released sixteen days after his death), and more recently, Mac Miller's 2020 posthumous album, Circles.

== See also ==
- Album-equivalent unit
- Album-oriented rock
- Art release
- Comedy album
- Concept album
- Lists of albums
- Mastering
- Record sales
- Remix album
- Soundtrack album
- Split album
