= Already (Jesus Jones album) =

Studio album by Jesus Jones
- Released: 18 August 1997
- Recorded: June 1996–January 1997
- Genre: Alternative dance; alternative rock; pop rock; soft rock; techno
- Length: 49:21
- Label: Food, RT Industries (current)
- Producer: Jesus Jones

Jesus Jones chronology
Perverse (1993)	Already (1997)	London (2001)

Already is the fourth album by the British rock band Jesus Jones, first released in 1997.

The album followed a working hiatus by the band following the disappointing commercial sales of 1993's Perverse compared to their international breakthrough album Doubt (1991). Although the band had come up with ideas that they submitted to Food Records for consideration, the label rejected them before finally accepting the reworked tracks featured on the release version of Already. It was their last album for EMI, and two singles were released from the album, "The Next Big Thing" and "Chemical #1". Already only reached No. 161 in the UK Albums Chart, although lead single "The Next Big Thing" had some radio play reaching No. 49 in the UK Singles Chart. EMI re-issued on the album on 1 March 2003. The album marks a strong shift into pop territory, with similarities to their second album, Doubt.

== Background ==
With their second album Doubt (1991), Jesus Jones found international fame after already charting in UK charts with Liquidizer and its singles. The album was an ever-greater success than Liquidizer in the UK, charting at number one in the UK Albums Chart whilst Liquidizer only entered the charts at number 31. In the United States, Jesus Jones became known for the hit singles "Right Here, Right Now" and "Real Real Real". Doubt entered the Billboard 200 at number 25. The Doubt era was also very successful critically. Following up Doubt was 1993's Perverse, which was a departure for the band lyrically and was one of the first ever albums to be fully recorded digitally. Although a critical success and reaching number 6 in the UK Albums Chart and number 59 on the Billboard 200, its full scale sales were significantly below that of Doubt.

== Recording ==
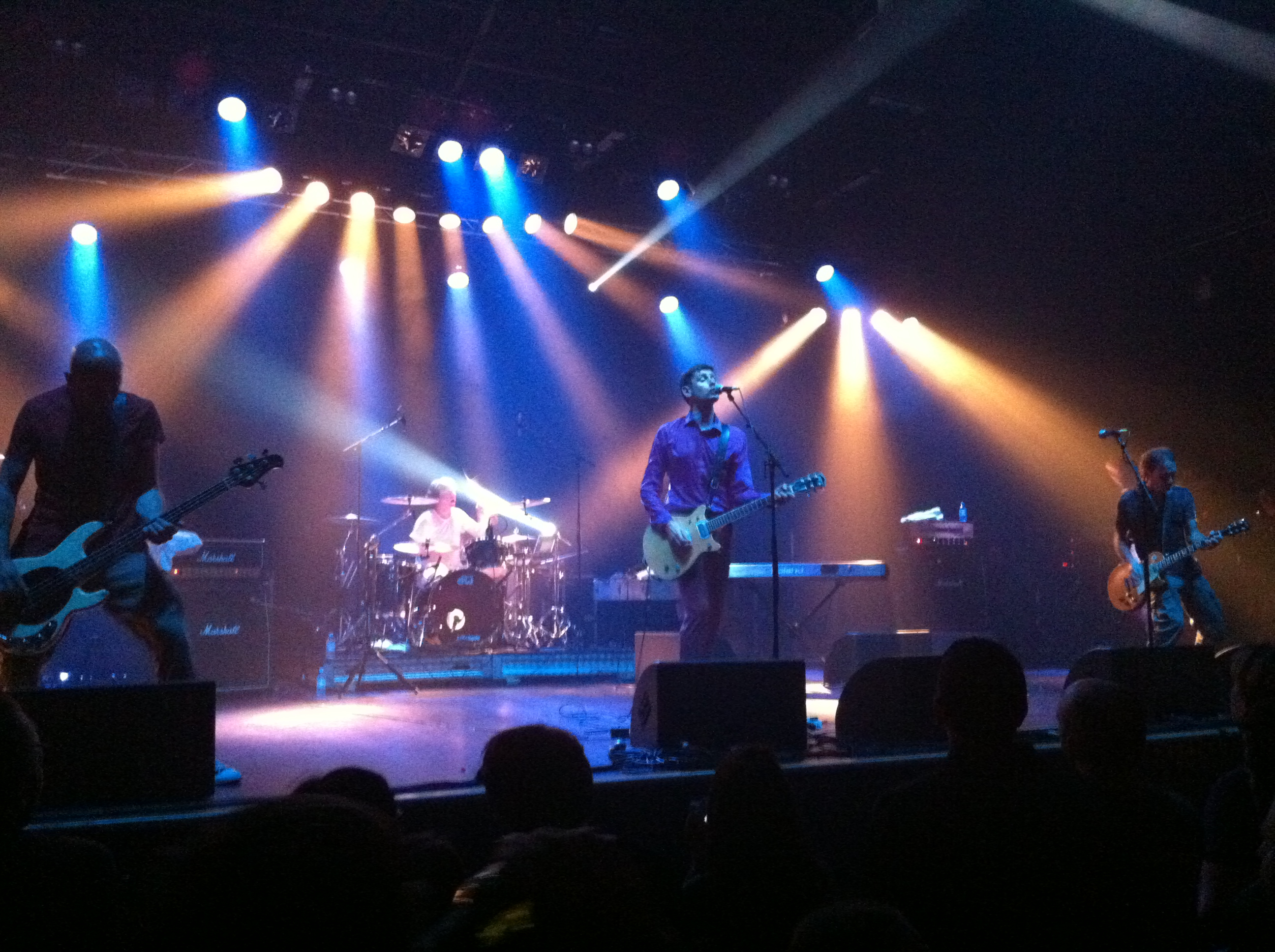
Jesus Jones (pictured in 2011) submitted several albums to EMI before they selected Already.

As the success of Perverse was below that of expected, lead singer Mike Edwards decided that their next album, to be released in 1994, would be "whatever he wanted to write" without as much pressure from Food Records, and would be more techno in nature. The label turned this album down, saying there wasn't enough single material on the album. Edwards wrote 16 more songs but the label again rejected the band's work. Alan Doughty later recalled that Edwards became disillusioned, but the band then gathered the best tracks from the two previous drafts of Already and reworked them. Very pleased with their results, Food Records finally accepted Already.

Big beat had become a prominent feature of the music scene between the release of Perverse and Already. When asked if the success of big beat acts such as The Chemical Brothers and The Prodigy had either stimulated Jesus Jones during the recording of Already or instead made them bitter, due to the arguable similarities between big beat and Jesus Jones' earlier alternative dance sound, Mike Edwards said that he didn't feel bitter and that there are "major differences between Jesus Jones and those bands" and commented on The Prodigy's pre-"Firestarter" success which he claimed the press had widely ignored, saying The Prodigy were also an influence on them so it would be "ridiculous to suggest they are following our footsteps."

Mike Edwards revealed following the release of the album that he was approached by EMI to make a solo album for Food Records, but chose to put this on hold to focus on Jesus Jones' US tour. During the hiatus between Already and London, Edwards found time for the solo album although the project was cancelled because, as he said in 2001, the said the idea was something "that they'd ultimately not be interested in (even though [he] thought some of the songs had some good points.)" Gen left the band in 1997 before the album's release but appears on the album. Tony Arthy replaced his role as the band's drummer and percussionist in 1999.

== Release ==
The album was released in August 1997 in the UK by Food Records and in the US by Combustion Records on the back of the lead single "The Next Big Thing" which reached number 49 in the UK Singles Chart. The album was promoted mostly online. Mike Edwards commented shortly after release that non-digital promotion failed. The second single from the album was "Chemical #1", which reached number 71 on the UK Singles Chart. Two of the album's outtakes were featured as bonus tracks on the US release. The album also notably carries the logo for EMI 100, a campaign celebrating 100 years of EMI. Chris Cunningham directed the music video for "The Next Big Thing".

== Album artwork ==
London-based painter and illustrator Blaise Thompson produced the album cover for Already. Thompson also created the artwork for the singles "The Next Big Thing", and "Chemical #1", and later for the band's demo compilation release "Already Demos".

== Critical reception ==
Professional ratings
Review scores
Source	Rating
AllMusic	2/5 stars

The album received a mixed critical reception upon release and only reached number 161 in the UK Albums Chart. Mike Edwards said in 1997 that this album and Perverse are the albums he is most proud of for "being done properly and as [he] wanted them, not hurried and rushed like the first two", further commenting that Already is "the most consistent album, the one with the best songs."

Following Already, the band parted ways with Food Records, alongside their parent label EMI. The band took a different, more acoustic approach to London, which was released on Mi5 Recordings. London was a deliberately low-key release in terms of promotion, initially only being released in the United States. In 2002, EMI released Never Enough: The Best of Jesus Jones, a compilation of the tracks Jesus Jones recorded with Food Records. The two singles from Already were chosen for inclusion alongside "They're Out There" and "February".

The album has been re-released several times. EMI in re-released the album on 1 March 2003, whilst Edsel Records released a deluxe edition on 24 November 2014, featuring three discs; the original album with previously unreleased material on the first disc, the album's B-sides and The "Lost" Demos on disc two, and a DVD featuring the music videos and a short concert film titled Live at TJ's Newport, 1996.

== Track listing ==
All songs written by Mike Edwards.

1. "The Next Big Thing" – 4:01
2. "Run on Empty" – 3:13
3. "Look Out Tomorrow" – 3:34
4. "Top of the World" – 3:31
5. "Rails" – 3:13
6. "Wishing It Away" – 5:04
7. "Chemical #1" – 3:26
8. "Motion" – 4:54
9. "They're Out There" – 4:01
10. "For a Moment" – 3:31
11. "Addiction, Obsession & Me" – 4:19
12. "February" – 6:43
13. "Together" – 3:45 (US bonus track)
14. "Man on the Moon" – 3:30 (US bonus track)
