= London (Jesus Jones album) =

Studio album by Jesus Jones
- Released: 9 October 2001
- Recorded: December 2000–August 2001
- Genre: Alternative rock; alternative dance; techno; industrial
- Length: 42:01
- Label: Mi5/Koch
- Producer: Jesus Jones

Jesus Jones chronology
Already (1997)	London (2001)	Culture Vulture (2004)

London is the fifth album by the British rock band Jesus Jones in 2001 through Koch Records. Following the commercial failure of 1997's Already which led to the band and EMI parting ways, the band took a hiatus before regathering for the recording of London for Koch/Mi5 Recordings, with a more alternative rock approach as opposed to the techno sounds on their previous albums. The album had low-key promotion, initially only being released in the United States. Two EP's were released from the album, "Nowhere Slow" and "In the Face Of All This".

== Background ==
Already, the band's fourth studio album, was released in 1997 to mixed reviews and very bad commercial success, where it only reached 161 in the UK Albums Chart (their third album Perverse reached number 6 in contrast.) They band chose to focus on the US tour following the album's release. The band and EMI/Food Records parted ways in 1998, for unspecified reasons but presumably due to record sales. The band ultimately fell into recording hiatus following this although Tony Arther joined the band in 1998/99 as the band's drummer to replace Gen, who left during the Already era.

Mike Edwards formed the side project Yoshi for which he played lead guitar. He also worked on a solo album that he was approached to make by EMI in 1997 which he initially chose to put this on hold to focus on Jesus Jones' Already US tour, although when Edwards found time for the solo album, the project was cancelled because he said the album was something "that they'd ultimately not be interested in" despite he himself finding some of the tracks to have "good points".

Mike Edwards got re-interested in Jesus Jones with the idea that some of his solo songs from the cancelled project could be shaped into Jesus Jones and then to sell via the internet. Gen, who left the band years prior, then got in contact with Mike Edwards indicating he was keen to work again. Lastly, Mi5 Recordings in the United States got in touch with the band in spite of a record contract. Mike Edwards travelled to New York City where he met with the label's manager and discovered they both had similar thoughts on the state of the music industry. The band subsequently signed to the label in 2001 and played several gigs in the UK and US.

== Music and release ==
When asked in 2001 if London bore musical similarities to the band's previous work, Mike Edwards said there was influences that were "less popular as he was writing the last album that are a central part of this album.", citing drum and bass and garage music as influences on London. He further commented that "those things make it sound very different, although saying that my signature hasn't changed in the last 10 years either so I think it's still clearly a Jesus Jones album" and that he thought the album was much more relaxed and happy since "it's been made in a far better atmosphere than the last two [Jesus Jones] albums."

Mike Edwards said in promotion of the album that London was a US release primarily, where it was released on 9 October 2001, although the band were currently working out ways "of getting sold [the album] around the world. Obviously the UK is important to us but there are plenty of fans around the world still that we need to look after". Two singles were released, which were also the last two songs on the album, "Nowhere Slow" and "In the Face of All This". They did not chart. The band embarked on a US tour in December 2001.

== Critical reception ==
Professional ratings
Review scores
Source	Rating
AllMusic	3/5 stars

The album received positive reviews from critics. AllMusic, however, gave the album three out of 5 stars, noting "London is about [the band] and the natural progression in perfecting the music they want to play out live. However, the loyalists who made them superstars nearly ten years prior to this release might have outgrown them." The album did not chart in the UK or US. The band transferred to Mi5 Recordings UK for the next release, Culture Vulture !. Following the release of London, EMI released a compilation of pre-London material, Never Enough: The Best of Jesus Jones. The band also performed in November 2002 for a one-off gig in The Marquee, London where some of the setlist was chosen online by the band's fanclub. This was released as the DVD Live at the Marquee in 2003, and later as a live album with the same name in 2005.

== Track listing ==
- All songs written by Mike Edwards
1. "Message" - 2:24
2. "Stranger" - 3:28
3. "The Rocket Ships of La Jolla" - 3:50
4. "Asleep on the Motorway" - 3:17
5. "Hello Neon!" - 4:05
6. "The A Team" - 3:09
7. "Half Up the Hill" - 3:27
8. "The Princess of My Heart" - 3:34
9. "Getaway Car" - 2:43
10. "To Get There" - 4:28
11. "Nowhere Slow" - 4:01
12. "In the Face of All This" - 3:35
