= Doubt (album) =

1991 album by Jesus Jones

Studio album by Jesus Jones
- Released: 21 January 1991
- Recorded: Early 1990
- Studios: Matrix, London
- Genre: Techno-rock
- Length: 40:39
- Label: Food
- Producers: Mike Edwards; Andy Ross; Martyn Phillips

Jesus Jones chronology
Liquidizer (1989)	Doubt (1991)	Perverse (1993)

Singles from Doubt
- 1. "Real, Real, Real" Released: 26 March 1990; 2. "Right Here, Right Now" Released: 24 September 1990; 3. "International Bright Young Thing" Released: December 1990; 4. "Who? Where? Why?" Released: 18 February 1991

Doubt is the second album by British rock band Jesus Jones, released on 21 January 1991 through Food Records. The label witnessed the success of their debut album Liquidizer (1989) and wanted more hit-sounding music from the band. Frontman Mike Edwards wrote new material on their tour bus and in hotel rooms; they recorded some of it in early 1990, before touring resumed. After the conclusion of a tour of the United Kingdom, the band spent a week in May 1990 recording the bulk of their next album at Matrix Studios in London. Edwards produced the majority of the tracks, with Food Records co-founder Andy Ross and Martyn Phillips producing one song each.

Doubt is a techno-rock album that refines the sample-heavy approach of Liquidizer. During the making of it, they listened to music from the likes of the KLF, Janet Jackson and Mel and Kim. Edwards, who had been consuming a large amount of popular music wanted it be a reaction to Liquidizer, exploring the influence of dance music had over rock. His lyrics had been compared to that of the Kinks frontmant Ray Davies, while the album's psychedelia overtones evoked the Beatles' late 1960s period and contemporary baggy acts the Charlatans and Happy Mondays.

"Real, Real, Real" was released the lead single from Doubt in March 1990; over the next few months, Jesus Jones performed at various festivals, before embarking on their first tour of North America in September 1990. That same month, "Right Here, Right Now" was released as the second single from the album, which was later promoted with a UK tour. The track would be released in the United States in December 1990, while "International Bright Young Thing" became the third single from Doubt that same month. Following an appearance at the Great British Music Weekend, "Who? Where? Why?" was released as the album's fourth single in February 1991. The band promoted it with tours of the UK and US; MTV would help to give the band a boost in popularity in the latter territory.

Doubt received generally positive reviews about the songwriting, though some critics were less enthusiastic about it. It reached number 25 on the US Billboard 200 and topped the UK Albums Chart, and later certified platinum in the US. "Real, Real, Real", "Right Here, Right Now", "International Bright Young Thing" and "Who? Where? Why?" all reached the top 40 in the UK, with "International Bright Young Thing" charting the highest at number seven. In the US, "Real, Real, Real" and "Right Here, Right Now" peaked at number four and two on the Billboard Hot 100, respectively. Toledo Blade included it on their list of the year's best releases; it and "Right Here, Right Now" would be nominated for Grammy Awards. The song earned an award from the BMI and PRS for being the most played track at college radio.

== Background and writing ==
Jesus Jones released their debut studio album Liquidizer was released through Food Records in October 1989. The band's emergence happened concurrently with the Madchester movement that birthed Happy Mondays and the Stone Roses. Jesus Jones were being tagged as grebo by the music press, alongside contemporaries Gaye Bikers on Acid and Pop Will Eat Itself, much to the chagrin of frontman Mike Edwards. Despite this, the band received acclaim from publications, while the album would peak number 32 in the UK Albums Chart. Its singles "Info Freako" and "Never Enough" both charted at number 42 on the UK Singles Chart, while "Bring It Down" reached number 46. By the end of the year, they had a publishing deal and a manager; Edwards was confident about this success, though mentioned that it quickly shifted into scrutiny, "doubt and a lack of self-confidence. I looked around at what we'd done and thought 'Have we just fooled everybody? Are we really that good?'"

Spurred on by this initial success, Food Records wanted to make Jesus Jones even more popular, urging them to make hit-sounding music. Edwards had started writing material for the next album while the label was busy with releasing Liquidizer, which had been issued in the United States by SBK Records. In that territory, three of the album's songs received significant airplay from alternative radio stations. They did not have much time to work on songs as they toured incessantly, forcing them to write while travelling. Edwards brought along a Roland sampler and keyboard to craft tracks on their tour bus. Off-days were spent in hotel rooms, where they were able to have a writing set-up.

== Recording ==
Jesus Jones recorded new material in early 1990 prior to touring in Romania, shortly after the revolution, and across mainland Europe with the Cramps. Jesus Jones embarked on a short, five-date tour of the UK in May 1990, with support from Ned's Atomic Dustbin. According to the album booklet, the bulk of the album was recorded in seven days in May 1990, but the mixing process "took a bit longer". In an interview with the Orlando Sentinel, Edwards said that recording took only six days. He said it was listed as seven to "make it seem credible, and also there's that tiresome religious connotation, 'On the seventh day we rested.'" Food Records gave the band unlimited funds, with them opting to recorded in a cheaper studio, using only a portion of the time they took on the first album. More money was spent on the mixing process and making remixes than recording itself. Keyboardist Iain Baker said Edwards was in a stressful environment, having to deliver on expectations placed on him. As such, practically every demo they had was "pressed into service, every idea had to be used" for the album.

Sessions were held at Matrix Studios in London, and due to the short time they had, they ended up completing three tracks per day. Edwards produced the majority of the songs with Clive Goddard acting as the engineer. Food Records co-founder Andy Ross produced "I'm Burning", while Martyn Phillips engineered and produced "Right Here, Right Now". The latter collaboration came about as the band enjoyed his work with the Beloved. Edwards showed Phillips a version of the track, which had samples taken from "Sign o' the Times" (1987) by Prince. As Phillips had previously got into trouble for using a sample without authorization with the Beloved, he went about altering "Right Here, Right Now". John Fryer mixed the songs, while Phil Harding and Ian Curnow remixed and did additional production on " International Bright Young Thing" and "Real, Real, Real". Baker said the latter two individuals offered "some pop gloss" to the two tracks. He remarked that the rest of the band were more enthusiastic about the production since it provided "some bass as well as treble", compared to the "tinny blast" of Liquidizer.

== Composition and lyrics ==
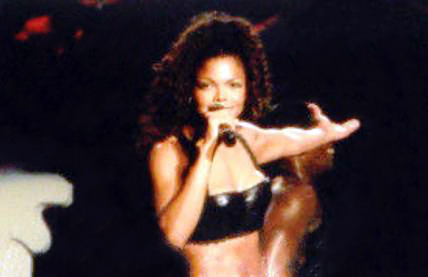
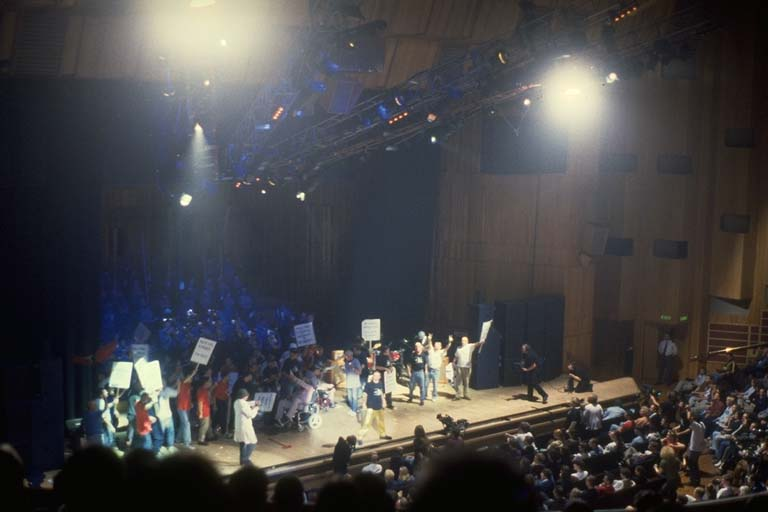
Jesus Jones listened to the works of Janet Jackson (top) and the KLF (bottom) prior to and during the making of Doubt.

=== Music and themes ===
Doubt continued the sample-heavy direction of Liquidizer, but refined it; where the latter had found sounds and other miscellaneous audio clips, the band wanted the tracks on Doubt to be anchored around samples. The advancement of technology allowed gave them more ways of toying with samples, ranging from reversing to pitch shifting and altering the structure. The members of Jesus Jones had slowly become aware of what Baker dubbed "the sample wars", exemplified by the Turtles suing De La Soul. He said that they wanted to showcase that sample was not about stealing someone else's music, but instead making new sounds from it. Nick Duerden in The Rough Guide to Rock wrote that it melded "screaming guitars with samples, white noise and techno dynamics", while PopMatters critic Matthew Chabe said they "drop[ped] the wall-of-noise for chiming guitars and Beatle-esque melodies" after the first track. The New York Times's Jon Pareles wrote that the album "layers on swirls of sound that recall late-1960's psychedelia," in particular the Beatles late 1960s period, which Doug Iverson of Toledo Blade compared to baggy acts the Charlatans and Happy Mondays. While complimenting its cohesive nature, Baker saw it was their "most disjointed" release due to its creation and having to ask Food Records if it was to their liking.

Musically, the sound of Doubt has been described as techno-rock. Parry Gettelman of Orlando Sentinel said that the "melodies are stronger, and the mixes are more radio-friendly – with vocals right up front", giving the album "stronger pop leanings" than what was heard on Liquidizer. Edwards said the band intentionally made Doubt to serve as a reaction to its predecessor: "making a strong statement about what rock music should be about in the '90s, which I think has less to do with the dance-rock sound than the influence of dance music on rock music, the techniques of dance music". Edwards had been consuming a substantial amount of popular music, from Mel and Kim to Janet Jackson, which he tried to emulate with the album. Alongside this, Baker said they would often be listening to Chill Out (1990) by the KLF while on tour.

Edwards said the album's title partially stemmed from the intensive interviews, where he was being quizzed on "everything the band and I had done and were doing" when promoting Liquidizer, which coincided with him dealing with depression. Steve Hochman of Los Angeles Times wrote that Edwards' lyricism came across with an "wit and sentimental eye in the tradition" of Ray Davies from the Kinks. Baker thought that the stressful process of making the album shaped its narrative direction, explaining that in lieu of the tracks themselves "telling a story, the process of writing actually became the story". He went on to say that the songs were representations of the locations they visited, individuals they interacted with, the uplifting outlook which they had from being a new act, alongside the "uncertainty, the fear of failure, and the doubt" they faced.

=== Tracks ===
Doubt opens with "Trust Me", the shortest song on the album, recalling the sound of Liquidizer and Time's Up (1990) by Living Colour with its acid house groove and wall of sound guitarwork. The song was influenced by samples of Formula One racing cars driving on a race track, which Edwards had taped off a television with a cassette recorder. Baker said they sped up the sound bites until they "sounded like demented wasps." "Who? Where? Why" uses an Eastern melody, extrapolated from an African-esque chant that Edwards found on a tape of African music that he learned from the Willesden Library in London. Baker said that a portion of that sample is played normally before it loops itself repeatedly. They had written it shorted after getting signed, as they became aware of the expectations from press outlets. The dance-rock track "International Bright Young Thing" mixes the tape loop experimentation of "Tomorrow Never Knows" (1966) by the Beatles with the contemporary beats from dance music. The song remained lyric-less until the band were on a flight from Tokyo, Japan, serving as a summarization of fans they encountered while traveling around the world. Edwards described "I'm Burning" as a "re-occurrence of the B-side that was too good syndrome", where he tried to sound like the Icicle Works. Select writer Neil Perry thought that it showed an evolution of the band's sound, "now a little tighter with the bluster and rush but still full blast on atmosphere".

Baker saw "Right Here, Right Now" as an attempt by Edwards to create a mature track, adding that audiences considered them as a flash-in-the-pan act. The song refers to the collapse of the Berlin Wall. Edwards said he came across a cover of "Sign o' the Times" that Simple Minds had done, liking their "enthusiasm for the song but not necessarily their version, but also thinking that Sign O’ The Times is a very down song, it has a very bleak view of the times". Scott Rowley of Louder said Edwards then went out to remake the song for "the, like, actual times" with "Right Here, Right Now", crafting a demo that used loops from "Sign O' the Times". "Nothing to Hold Me" features a sample of the TARDIS sound from Doctor Who, and has Edwards and Baker "speaking [from] our hearts", with Edwards saying Baker was a "man for whom tuning is only a concert for others. Like me". Baker commented that it referred to a girl he was dating while the rest of the band "put a wedge between us"; he wrote it after they visited the Berlin Wall. "Real, Real, Real" was reminiscent of the work of Happy Mondays, and has a note of a female voice edited to sound akin to an organ. The initial demo of it was influenced by Sly and the Family Stone and Jackson's Rhythm Nation (1989), as they tried to make a swingbeat track in the style of Teddy Riley, giving it the working title "Janet".

"Welcome Back Victoria" evoked the sound of XTC and "Sunny Afternoon" (1966) by the Kinks. It features acoustic guitar parts over synthesizers and the ticking of a programmed snare drum, and talks about the double standards of the Victorian era. With "Are You Satisfied?", Edwards wanted to make a track he considered "metal house". "Two and Two" is a punk rock and pop metal song, where the band tried to evoke the sound of Sonic Youth. "Stripped" is influenced by a message that a Romanian journalist was adamant that Edwards returned home with: "Everybody is hungry / Everyone needs to know". Perry referred to it as a "nightmare soundscape that changes from tortured screaming to a super-funky freak-out", while Baker remarked that it was the "sound of a band who are listening to way too much Big Black" and attempting to distil that into a pop song. The album concludes with "Blissed", a mellow track anchored by a synthesizer part and bird sounds, influenced by Chill Out. Inspired by a John Lennon quote about wanting to have thousands of voices on a recording, Edwards wanted to make something that fit that using a sampler. He wrote the words to it after a van trip to the Swiss Alps in Switzerland; Baker considered it to be about living in the moment.

== Release ==
=== Album promotion and touring ===
Despite its quick recording time, Baker mentioned that Jesus Jones did not have the time to release an album as they had to go back on tour. Throughout 1990, their popularity increased as they trekked across other countries. Over the next few months, they appeared at various festivals, including Glastonbury and Reading. In September 1990, the band embarked on their first tour of North America. The following month, the band played a Andy Kershaw session for BBC Radio 1, where they performed "Right Here, Right Now", "International Bright Young Thing" and "Trust Me", and went on a tour of the UK.

Doubt was released in the UK on 21 January 1991 through Food Records; "Are You Satisfied?" was included on the US copies of the album, but was absent from the UK editions. SBK Records would gave the band a large amount of promotion in an attempt to break them in America, despite them being an alternative act amongst a roster of Wilson Phillips and Vanilla Ice. The band performed at the Great British Music Weekend, a tie-in with the Brit Awards which featured leftfield acts, including the Farm and Ride. In February 1991, the band went on a tour of the UK with support from Soho. Jesus Jones embarked on a US tour, which lasted until June 1991, with support from Ned's Atomic Dustbin. MTV helped to boost the band's career in the US, with Edwards remarking that he could only considering himself a success if he made it in that territory.

Jesus Jones released their first video album, Big in Alaska, on VHS through Picture Music International on 1 June 1991, which collected the music videos from Liquidizer and Doubt. Upon returning home to the UK, they supported INXS for a show at the Wembley Stadium to a crowd of 72,000, before returning to the US to appear at the MTV Video Music Awards. Jesus Jones ended the year headlining a Food Records Christmas show alongside labelmates Blur, Diesel Park West and Whirlpool. In January 1992, they played two shows in Brazil in Sao Paulo and Rio de Janeiro, respectively, as part of the Rock in Rio festival.

=== Singles ===
"Real, Real, Real" was released as the lead single from Doubt on 26 March 1990. Its various CD, seven-inch and twelve-inch vinyl configurations included remixes alongside "Dead People's Lives" and "Info Freako". The music video for "Real, Real, Real" features, as Baker describes, the band "dressed up like Muppets covered in vomit"; an alternative video was shot for the US market, directed by Pedro Romhanyi. The band performed the song on Top of the Pops on 12 April 1990.

Coinciding with their first North American jaunt, "Right Here, Right Now" was released as the second single from the album on 24 September 1990. The CD version featured "Are You Satisfied?", "Damn Good at This" and "Move Me" as the B-sides, while the twelve-inch edition included "Are You Satisfied?" alongside remixes of "Right Here, Right Now" and the Liquidizer track "Move Mountains". The music video for "Right Here, Right Now", which was filmed at Pinewood Studios, shows footage of the band, cut with conflicts from across Europe in the late 1980s. Images of political figures George H. W. Bush and Mikhail Gorbachev and map of central Europe can also be seen.

"Right Here, Right Now" sat outside of the UK top 30 single chart. This position, which was lower than "Real, Real, Real", did not concern SBK Records, who were waiting to issue Doubt in 1991 and push "Right Here, Right Now" soon afterwards. A group of US radio programmers had seen the band live in the UK and were ecstatic about "Right Here, Right Now", to the point they purchased copies of it and were subsequently playing them over the US airwaves. SBK's radio promoter Mike Mena called the stations, and while appreciative, asked them to stop until it went on sale. A week after this, Mena was contacted by one programmer who said their listeners were complaining about not being able to hear the track. The programmer said he was putting the track back in rotation and told Mena that the label should rush release it. SBK officially sent the song to radio stations in December 1990. They had planned to issue an EP of live recordings until this happened, which eventually was made available at retail, consisting of versions of tracks from Liquidizer.

"International Bright Young Thing" was released as the album's third single in December 1990. Its various CD, twelve-inch vinyl and picture disc configurations included remixes alongside "Maryland" and "Need to Know". Baker said the music video for "International Bright Young Thing" has the band jumping on a boxing ring with a camera position above them. Though, as it was made using a green screen, the band had no clue what video would be like until it was finished. They performed the song on Top of the Pops on 10 January 1991, and then on Going Live! nine days later.

"Who? Where? Why?" was released as the fourth single from the album on 18 February 1991. Its various CD, ten-inch and twelve-inch vinyl configurations included remixes alongside "Caricature" and "Kill Today". The band performed "Who? Where? Why?" on Top of the Pops at the end of the month. "Right Here, Right Now" was reissued in July 1991 with remixed versions of "Broken Bones", "Info Psyscho" and "Welcome Back Victoria" as its B-sides. "Real, Real, Real" was released in the US on 30 July 1991. "Welcome Back Victoria" was released as a promotional radio single in 1991, with the album version and a CHR remix done by Gary Hellman and John Luongo.

=== Reissues, related releases and events ===
A two-CD and DVD set of Doubt was released in 2014, collecting various B-sides, remixes, live performances and demos. In September 2014, Jesus Jones went on their first UK trek in a decade, where they performed Doubt in its entirety. They subsequently repeated this in March 2015 with a trip to Australia and New Zealand. The regular version of the album, alongside 2014 bonus material, was included on the career-spanning box set Some of the Answers in 2022. It was re-pressed on vinyl through Demon Records in 2022.

"Who? Where? Why?", "International Bright Young Thing", "Right Here, Right Now", "Real, Real, Real" and "Welcome Back Victoria" were featured on the compilation album The Greatest (1998). "International Bright Young Thing", "Right Here, Right Now" and "Blissed" were included on the compilation Never Enough (The Best of Jesus Jones) (2002). "Right Here, Right Now", "Real, Real, Real" and "Stripped" were featured on the compilation The Collection – A Selection of Band Favourites and Rarities (2011). "Trust Me", "Who? Where? Why?", "International Bright Young Thing", "Right Here, Right Now", "Real, Real, Real", "Welcome Back Victoria", "Are You Satisfied?" and "Blissed" were featured on the compilation Zeroes and Ones – The Best Of (2022).

== Critical reception ==
Professional ratings
Review scores
Source	Rating
AllMusic	4/5 stars
The Encyclopedia of Popular Music	3/5 stars
Entertainment Weekly	B
MusicHound Rock: The Essential Album Guide	3.5/5 stars
New Straits Times	2.5/5 stars
The Rolling Stone Album Guide	3/5 stars
Select	4/5

Several critics praised the songwriting of Doubt. AllMusic reviewer Steve Huey said it "benefits greatly from Mike Edwards' improved songwriting, as well as a better idea of how to effectively fuse guitar-rock with samples and dance-club beats". In a review for Entertainment Weekly, journalist Simon Reynolds added to this, saying it was "close to a perfect fusion of rock and house" music, with Chabe singling out "International Bright Young Thing" as a prime example. Iverson, meanwhile, considered the band to be "more than your usual musical smorgasbord", adding that they are able to "coax your carcass out on to the dance floor". Perry was impressed that the band could avoid being pigeon-holed, ignoring trends of the day, but complained that many of the tracks were "too short. As soon as you sink into any particular rhythm that's it, too late".

A few reviewers were less impressed with the songwriting. The Washington Post writer Mark Jenkins wrote that with Edwards "layering sing-along refrains over hammering synthetic rhythms and associated racket," the album "retains the sass and savvy" of Liquidizer. He thought that "Right Here, Right Now" and "Real, Real, Real" were significantly "less catchy than the ones [singles] that preceded it"; Gary Graff and Doug Brod Trouser Press thought that the album lacked the "bursting freshness (or repetitiveness) of its predecessor". In a retrospective piece for Pitchfork, contributor Chris Ott thought that the album's "techno-rock synthesis has aged disastrously"; despite this, he mentioned that it was "agonizingly samey and overflowing with filler". New Straits Times's R.S. Murthi wrote that "too often, the stylistic welding leads to some blurred moments where you don't know if there's a common thread holding it all together".

== Commercial performance ==
Doubt topped the albums chart in the UK; in other territories, it peaked at number six in New Zealand, number ten in Europe, number 23 in Australia, number 25 on the US Billboard 200 and number 35 in Canada. It was certified silver and gold by the British Phonographic Industry on the same day two weeks after release, while the Recording Industry Association of America certified it gold in June 1991, and platinum by November 1991. In other countries, the album was certified platinum by Music Canada and Recorded Music NZ.

"Real, Real, Real" charted at number 19 in the UK. In the US, it peaked at number four on the Billboard Hot 100, number five on Dance Club Songs, number 26 on Alternative Airplay and number 30 on Radio Songs. In other territories, it peaked at number ten in Canada, number 37 in New Zealand, number 48 in Europe, number 59 in the Netherlands and number 117 in Australia.

"Right Here, Right Now" charted at number 31 in the UK, both on original release and its reissue. In the US, it peaked at number two on the Hot 100, being kept off the top spot by "(Everything I Do) I Do It for You" (1991) by Bryan Adams. It also reached number one on Alternative Songs, number three on Radio Songs, number seven on Mainstream Rock Airplay and number 29 on Dance Club Songs. In other territories, it reached number 18 in Canada, number 29 in New Zealand, number 35 in Australia, number 61 in the Netherlands, number 84 in Germany and number 87 in Europe.

"International Bright Young Thing" charted at number seven in the UK; in other territories, it peaked at number six on Alternative Airplay in the US, number 22 in New Zealand, number 29 in Europe, number 58 in Canada, and number 79 in Australia. "Who? Where? Why?" charted at number 21 in the UK, number 48 in New Zealand and number 82 in Europe.

== Accolades and legacy ==
Toledo Blade included Doubt on their list of the best releases from the year. Jesus Jones had two Grammy Awards nominations: Doubt for Best Alternative Music Album and "Right Here, Right Now" for Best Pop Performance by a Duo or Group with Vocals. "Right Here, Right Now" earned a BMI and PRS award for the most played track at college radio. The band won the Best New Artist in a Video award for appearing in "Right Here, Right Now" at the MTV Awards.

In July 1991, EMF, an act that had been viewed as an imitation of Jesus Jones, had commercial success in the US with "Unbelievable" (1991), with it topping the Hot 100. The concurrent Madchester movement had previously failed to crack the North American market, with the Charlatans having returned home from a US tour early in the first half of the year and the Stone Roses refusing to tour the country outright. Similarly, the latter had been occupied with record company issues while the members of Happy Mondays had lost themselves in hedonism. Publications in the UK noted that Jesus Jones commercially outdid these two acts in the US. AJ Ramierz of PopMatters wrote that both "Right Here, Right Now" and "Unbelievable" would date "obscenely fast, a trait that relegated those singles to the status of curious novelties not long after", with their respective follow-up releases being "forgotten cast-offs of a big Brit-led dance-rock intersection which never materialized".

Duerden said there was speculation of another British Invasion of the US charts, with God Fodder (1991) by Ned's Atomic Dustbin following shortly after, though this did not ultimately occur. Capitol Records' representative Jeffrey Shane, who attributed the band's cross-over success to his album-oriented rock (AOR) department, said they made radio stations more conscious of the demand for alternative tracks on rock stations, and as such, aided the careers of Nirvana and School of Fish. The staff at Toledo Blade said Jesus Jones' success, alongside that of Nirvana, helped to obscure the lines between alternative and mainstream music in 1991. In a 1992 interview, Mark Arm of Mudhoney credited Jesus Jones' success for giving grunge its commercial breakthrough. Christopher Lloyd of Louder Than War wrote in 2014 that the band "pioneer[ed] the use computers and samplers to create intelligent indie pop music, and history never really paid them their dues for doing so".

== Track listing ==
All songs written by Mike Edwards, except "Nothing to Hold Me" by Edwards and Iain Baker.

1. "Trust Me" – 2:08
2. "Who? Where? Why?" – 3:35
3. "International Bright Young Thing" – 3:12
4. "I'm Burning" – 3:20
5. "Right Here, Right Now" – 3:09
6. "Nothing to Hold Me" – 3:21
7. "Real, Real, Real" – 3:08
8. "Welcome Back Victoria" – 3:37
9. "Are You Satisfied?" – 3:52 (bonus track; not on all versions)
10. "Two and Two" – 2:53
11. "Stripped" – 3:51
12. "Blissed" – 4:49

== Personnel ==
Personnel per booklet.

Jesus Jones

- Mike Edwards – vocals, guitars
- Jerry de Borg – guitars
- Al Doughty – bass
- Iain Baker – keyboards, programming
- Simon "Gen" Mathews – drums

Production and design

- Mike Edwards – production (all except tracks 4 and 5)
- Clive Goddard – engineer (all except track 5)
- Martyn Phillips – producer (track 5)
- Andy Ross – producer (track 4)
- John Fryer – mixing (all except tracks 3 and 7)
- Phil Harding – remixing (tracks 3 and 7), additional production (tracks 3 and 7)
- Ian Curnow – remixing (tracks 3 and 7), additional production (tracks 3 and 7)
- Stylorouge – giftwrapping
- Simon Fowler – photography

== Charts and certifications ==
=== Weekly charts ===
Chart performance for Doubt
Chart (1991)	Peak position
Australian Albums (ARIA)	23
Canadian Albums (M&M)	35
European Albums (M&M)	10
New Zealand Albums (RMNZ)	6
UK Albums (OCC)	1
US Billboard 200	25

=== Certifications ===
Certifications for Doubt
Region	Certification	Certified units/sales
Canada (Music Canada)	Platinum	100,000^{^}
New Zealand (RMNZ)	Platinum	15,000^{^}
United Kingdom (BPI)	Gold	100,000^{^}
United States (RIAA)	Platinum	1,000,000^{^}
^{^} Shipments figures based on certification alone.

== See also ==
- Schubert Dip – the 1991 debut album by EMF, which had a similar style and performed well commercially as Doubt

== Bibliography ==
=== AV media and books ===
- Baker, Iain (2022). Zeroes and Ones – The Best Of (booklet). Jesus Jones. Demon Records. EDSL0116.
- Cavanagh, David (2000). The Creation Records Story: My Magpie Eyes are Hungry for the Prize. London: Virgin Publishing. ISBN 1-85227-775-0.
- Doggett, Peter (2015). Electric Shock: From the Gramophone to the iPhone – 125 Years of Pop Music. Random House. ISBN 9781448130313. Archived from the original on 30 March 2023.
- Duerden, Nick (2003). "Jesus Jones". In Buckley, Peter (ed.). The Rough Guide to Rock. London: Rough Guides. ISBN 978-1-84353-105-0.
- Durchholz, Daniel; Graff, Gary, eds. (1999). MusicHound Rock: The Essential Album Guide. MusicHound. Visible Ink Press. ISBN 9781578590612.
- Edwards, Mike (2019). Death Threats from an Eight-Year-Old. Scout Media. ISBN 978-1-7330740-2-5.
- Harris, John (2004) [2003]. The Last Party – Britpop, Blair and the Demise of English Rock. London: Harper Perennial. ISBN 978-0-00-713473-1.
- Larkin, Colin (2007). "Jesus Jones". The Encyclopedia of Popular Music (5th concise ed.). Omnibus Press. ISBN 978-0-85712-595-8. Archived from the original on 22 March 2023.
- Osborn, Brad (2021). Interpreting Music Video: Popular Music in the Post-MTV Era. Taylor & Francis. ISBN 9781000360578. Archived from the original on 30 March 2023.
- Wills, Dominic; Sheehan, Tom (1999). The Charlatans: The Authorised History. London: Virgin Books. ISBN 0-7535-0194-5.

=== Journals and magazines ===
- Ahrold, Robbin, ed. (Winter 1993). "Londonbeat Takes Top Honor at BMI-PRS Awards" (PDF). BMI MusicWorld. OCLC 145394023. Archived (PDF) from the original on 31 January 2023.
- Anon. (9 January 1992a). "R.E.M., Adams lead the Grammy nomination pack". The Pittsburgh Press. OCLC 2266185. Archived from the original on 30 March 2023.
- Anon. (26 January 1992b). "1991: The Year in Music". Toledo Blade. OCLC 12962717. Archived from the original on 30 March 2023.
- Burns, Brian, ed. (12 September 1991). "R.E.M. Sweeps MTV Awards" (PDF). The Network Forty (79). Archived (PDF) from the original on 31 January 2023.
- Dalton, David, ed. (24 March 1990). "New Singles" (PDF). Music Week. ISSN 0265-1548. Archived (PDF) from the original on 30 March 2023.
- Hard, Bill (10 January 1992). "A View from the Top – Tower Time with Jeffrey Shane" (PDF). The Hard Report (258). OCLC 808636394. Archived (PDF) from the original on 31 January 2023.
- Hard, Bill, ed. (10 January 1992a). "Advertisement" (PDF). The Hard Report (258). OCLC 808636394. Archived (PDF) from the original on 31 January 2023.
- Hard, Bill, ed. (31 January 1992a). "Industrial Noise" (PDF). The Hard Report (261). OCLC 808636394. Archived (PDF) from the original on 14 March 2023.
- Iverson, Doug (17 March 1991). "Marcus Roberts shoots for stardom". Toledo Blade. OCLC 12962717. Archived from the original on 30 March 2023.
- Mann, Bill, ed. (12 May 1990). "On the Road" (PDF). Sounds. ISSN 0144-5774. Archived (PDF) from the original on 30 March 2023.
- Mena, Mike (1 May 1998). "Record Action" (PDF). FMQB. OCLC 857904873. Archived (PDF) from the original on 27 March 2023.
- Murthi, R.S. (22 May 1991). "One gem in a pile of rubbishy releases". New Straits Times. OCLC 1167649590. Archived from the original on 30 March 2023.
- Perry, Neil (February 1991). "Nothing Short of Miraculous". Select (8). ISSN 0959-8367.
- Redmond, Steve, ed. (19 January 1991a). "New Release: Albums" (PDF). Music Week. ISSN 0265-1548. Archived (PDF) from the original on 29 March 2023.
- Redmond, Steve, ed. (19 January 1991b). "Round-Up" (PDF). Music Week. ISSN 0265-1548. Archived (PDF) from the original on 29 March 2023.
- Redmond, Steve, ed. (16 February 1991c). "New Release: Singles" (PDF). Music Week. ISSN 0265-1548. Archived (PDF) from the original on 31 January 2023.
- Redmond, Steve, ed. (1 June 1991d). "Music Video" (PDF). Music Week. ISSN 0265-1548. Archived (PDF) from the original on 30 March 2023.
- Ryan, Linda (30 November 1990). "Alternative Inside" (PDF). The Gavin Report (1835). OCLC 34039542. Archived (PDF) from the original on 1 February 2023.
- So, Pedro (22 December 1991). "Jesus de skate" [Skateboard Jesus]. Jornal do Brasil (in Portuguese). OCLC 1754340. Archived from the original on 30 March 2023.
