= Liquidizer (album) =

Studio album by Jesus Jones
- Released: 2 October 1989
- Recorded: Mid-1989
- Genre: Techno; power pop
- Length: 39:29
- Label: Food
- Producer: Craig Leon

Jesus Jones chronology
Liquidizer (1989)	Doubt (1991)

Singles from Liquidizer
- 1. "Info Freako" Released: 13 February 1989; 2. "Never Enough" Released: 26 June 1989; 3. "Bring It on Down" Released: 11 September 1989

Liquidizer is the debut album by British rock band Jesus Jones, released in October 1989 through Food Records. After various line-up changes, the members of the band moved to London, where frontman Mike Edwards would diversify his musical tastes. Guitarist Jerry de Borg joined soon after; in May 1988, Edwards acquired a sampler which would further his songwriting. With the addition of keyboardist Iain Baker, the band signed to Food Records by the end of the year. Initially enthusiastic about working with producer David Motion, recording sessions with him were fruitless. Craig Leon then produced Liquidizer in mid-1989, helping to give the album its signature tone, though the members would later be disappointed by the mixing.

Liquidizer is a techno and power pop album, borrowing influence from hip hop, that employed a large amount of samples, drawing comparison to Pop Will Eat Itself, Renegade Soundwave and World Domination Enterprises. It was met with favourable reviews from critics, many of whom praised the songwriting and use of samples. The album peaked at number 32 on the UK Albums Chart. "Info Freako" was released as the album's lead single in February 1989, followed that same year by "Never Enough" in June 1989 and "Bring It on Down" in September 1989. The first two both charted at number 42 on the UK Singles Chart, while "Bring It Down" reached number 46.

== Background ==
In December 1979, a band featuring guitarist Mike Edwards and drummer Simon "Gen" Mathews held their first rehearsal. In February 1980, Mike Palmer was drafted in as their vocalist, and after a few months, Edwards became adamant about having a career in music. After finishing school, Edwards and Palmer went to London to hand out demo tapes to A&R departments at potential record labels. Edwards would leave the band by mid-1983; he spent several months working on material alone before deciding to form a new act with Gen and Palmer. Since they lacked a bassist, Edwards contacted a local representative from a Musicians' Union, who knew of bass-playing son of a friend of his. Al Doughty, whose musicianship impressed the rest of the band, subsequently showed up to rehearsals. As they wished to succeed with the band, the members decided on moving to London. During this time, Palmer became disenchanted with how long the process was taking and the lack of fortunes.

Two weeks before the planned relocation to London, Palmer left the band. Edwards, who had started doing backing vocals alongside his guitar playing, became the new vocalist. He struggled initially, to the point where Doughty suggested recruiting a female singer that he was aware of. In January 1985, they moved into a flat in the Walthamstow area of London. The trio found it difficult to secure gigs as promoters were not interested in the band, prompting them to take on "pay to play" engagements. Edwards found his bandmates competent musicians, but was critical of his own songwriting, referring to it as aimless. He continued to work on possible ideas using his Portastudio equipment. While this occurred, Doughty moved into the house of a former classmate, who joined them as a keyboardist. After two months, said person left as them and Edwards had differing personalities. Another keyboardist, from friends they made in East London, joined but left after two practices.

As this was the time period of the proliferation indie bands, such as the Jesus and Mary Chain and the Smiths, it dawned on Edwards that they should instead bring in another guitarist. Edwards and Gen relocated to Willesden, and shortly after, they put an advert in Melody Maker looking for a guitar player. Edwards said they received two responses: one from an "overweight guy of Cypriot descent" who "didn't seem all that interested", and the other from Jerry de Borg. Despite the poor sound in the room they held an audition in, which meant they were unable to hear what Borg was playing, he formally joined the band. Around the time he was discovering hip hop and sampling, Edwards' interest in skateboarding saw him practice at skateparks throughout London. Ghetto blasters at these locales allowed him to discover more music, such as the work of Age of Chance and Beastie Boys in 1986, and later acid house in 1988. He said that "enough originality was about to inspire" his songwriting, which coincided with him receiving a drum machine from a friend of Borg.

== Development and recording ==
Edwards saw an advert for a sampler in Loot in May 1988, which in reality was a "glorified echo pedal" with a maximum sampling time of two seconds. Despite the limitation, which he was able to extended with the tape-speed control on his Portastudio, it aided his creativity. Discussing the musical direction, Edwards highlighted the work of Age of Chance, Pop Will Eat Itself and the Shamen as for what he was aiming for. Inspired by the live sound of the Shamen, Edwards set about changing his band's live setup, with the inclusion of a drum trigger. While his love of making music was at a high point, he had considerably less interest in trying to promote it. As a result of their mutual pastime in skateboarding, Edwards met Iain Baker, who would later become their keyboardist. Gen stepped up in a managerial role, organising gigs and would approach managers of other bands in the hopes of taking them on. While on a holiday in Spain in June 1988, Borg, Edwards and Gen christened the band Jesus Jones. That same month, Edwards made a three-song cassette that featured early versions of "Info Freako", "Broken Bones" and "What's Going On", the latter then known as "Grunge Hip". Three months afterwards, Gen borrowed a half-complete demo of "Info Freako"; sometime later, Edwards was contacted by Andy Ross of Dave Balfe Management in October 1989. Ross told him that he was involved Food Records and invited Edwards for a meeting. Eight months prior, the label had given up independent status when they signed a deal with EMI and gained their distribution system.

With the involvement of EMI A&R representative Nick Gatfield, Jesus Jones subsequently signed a recording contract with Food Records in December 1988 for a single, with the option for a second single and an album. That same month, they had performed a gig to six people in Covent Garden. As talk of the band made its way through the music industry, a queue would form for their next show in January 1989 that wrapped around a city block. Soon afterwards, the members began using monikers: Edwards with Jesus H. Jones, Baker with Barry D and Doughty with Al Jaworski. Over the next few weeks, the band's gigs sold out as they started received coverage from the music press. The band members left their day jobs in order to support the Shamen and the Wonder Stuff on their respective tours between March and June 1989. Food Records proposed that "Bring It on Down" should be touted as a single; Balfe recommended David Motion as the choice of producer. Baker liked the suggestion as he enjoyed Motion's work with Clare Grogan, Intaferon and Strawberry Switchblade. Upon collaborating, Baker commented that Motion's "ultra-glossy and professional approach" did not work with what they wanted. Liquidizer was ultimately produced by Craig Leon, except for "Info Freako", which was produced by Edwards, in mid-1989. "Bring It on Down" went through numerous changes: a longer intro section, a portion evolving into "I Feel Love" (1977) by Donna Summer, and another that Baker said could "only be described as a free-form acid techno workout." Michael J. Ade acted as engineer for the sessions, while Nick Davies mixed "All the Answers" and "Bring It on Down". Baker felt that Leon was crucial to the album's tone, as he helped to unify "and giv[e] it a sense of its own identity. He also gave it its signature sound – a full-on squealing wall of high-frequencies of buzzing, trebly noise". Several mixes would be made as they tried to balance the guitar parts with the electronic backing tracks. When mixing concluded, Edwards took a copy to the band's rehearsal space. Upon listening to it, Baker said they were partially disappointed with it, but decided to focus on their upcoming gigs instead.

== Composition and lyrics ==
Samples needed to be grabbed as soon as they inspired you. If it was an album, connect the turntable to the sampler, and grab the sound – scratches and all. A lot of the samples on "Liquidizer" embody that, and are almost defiantly lo-fi as a result. [...] Once they were in the sampler – that's invariably how they came out the other side. Find it, grab it, catch it, release it.

– Iain Baker in 2014 on the use of samples

Musically, the sound of Liquidizer has been described as power pop and techno, with influence from hip hop, drawing comparison to the work of Pop Will Eat Itself, Renegade Soundwave and World Domination Enterprises. AllMusic reviewer Ned Raggett wrote that the liner notes list a myriad of sources for samples, stretching from "Prince and Sonic Youth to Apocalypse Now and the news and views of 1988 and 1989". Baker said the members were enthusiastic about releasing an album as quickly as they could, shifting their aim away from making a "grand artistic statement" to instead "strik[ing] while the iron was still hot". They focused on replicating their live sound, which was aggressive, frantic and loud; they performed like this in order to impress crowds.

Baker said their use of sampling made them stand out from their contemporaries, despite the technology being in its infancy having limited use. They had 12-bit Akai S950, which had insufficient memory for what the band wanted. In order to free up space, they could sample at half of the normal bandwidth, which Baker said was the equivalent of bouncing down tracks on a multi-track console. A drawback to this meant that the sound quality would worsen the sound quality, though Baker said they would be pushing this as much as they could. He mentioned that this creativity fed back into the tracks that Edwards wrote, which were "full of as much noise as possible". Tracks that they viewed as tame during the demo process would evolve into loud songs with more complex forms.

The opening track to Liquidizer, "Move Mountains", was inspired by taxi rides the band would take while during the album. Spectrum Culture writer Darryl G. Wright said the track begins with a house beat that shifts into what he theorised could be the "earliest 'crazy drop' in dance music history. A unrelenting freak out of grinding guitar melody, layer upon layer of swinging sirens, vocal samples and the icing on the cake — a breakbeat". Initially named "Norman", the lyrics for "Move Mountains" were influenced by a taxi ride that Edwards took through the North part of London, which was adorned by numerous religious artefacts. The piano part was taken from various American house records that Baker, who was working in a record store, had sent Edwards, while the "go!" sample was taken from a World Domination Enterprises song. "Never Enough" is based on the first scene in Stardust Memories (1980), where Paul Lester of Classic Pop wrote that the "protagonist finds himself dismally dissatisfied with his lot" of associates. Baker explained that it was about the "feeling that attaining happiness might not be enough." With "All the Answers", Baker said Edwards was attempting to remake "all of his favourite AC/DC chord progressions." "What's Going On" features hip hop break sections, with wah-wah enhanced guitar parts layered on top, and is followed by the industrial track "Song 13". For the latter, Baker explained that Edwards was inspired by albums in his parents' record collection, in particular, the self-titled album (1968) by the Beatles. "Info Freako" grew out of a 19-second snippet of a bass part and a guitar sample. Steve Lamacq dubbed the track a merger of "maniacal guitars and twisted samples that puts them somewhere between Crazyhead and Tackhead". "Too Much to Learn" is a dub-inspired track that was influenced by mundanity.

== Release ==
"Info Freako" was released as the lead single from Liquidizer on 13 February 1989, with "Broken Bones" and an alternative version of "Info Freako" titled "Info Sicko" as its B-sides. A remixed version of "Info Freako", renamed "Info Psycho (Dance Extravaganza)", was released as a twelve-inch vinyl record, with "Info Sicko" and "Info Freako" as its B-sides, in the following month. "Never Enough" was released as the second single from the album on 26 June 1989, with "What's Going On", "It's the Winning That Counts" and an alternative version of "Never Enough" titled "Enough – Never Enough" as the B-sides. The music video for "Never Enough" was directed by Andy Lee; Baker said Lee had the band pretend to be the Beatles, as the video was centred around the aftermath of John Lennon's "bigger than Jesus" remark. They performed at the Lorelei Festival in Germany, before supporting Tin Machine on their tour of the UK in June and July 1989. Afterwards, Jesus Jones embarked on a headlining tour and then appeared on the final day of the Reading Festival.

"Bring It on Down" was released as the third single from the album on 11 September 1989, with "None of the Answers", "Cut and Dried" and "Beat It Down" as the B-sides. A remixed version of "Bring It on Down", subtitled "liquidized mix", was released as a twelve-inch vinyl record, with "Cut and Dried" and "Info Sicko" as its B-sides. The music video for "Bring It on Down" was directed by John Maybury; Baker said Maybury "direct[ed] us, and a vast array of fruit and vegetables glued to plywood". Liquidizer was released through Food Records on 2 October 1989. The artwork featured a pop art image of a blender, which Craig Schuftan in Entertain Us – The Rise and Fall of Alternative Rock in the Nineties (2012) alluded to Edwards' "vision: in the nineties, we would use technology to mix music together". The band's emergence happened concurrently with the Madchester movement that birthed Happy Mondays and the Stone Roses. Jesus Jones, meanwhile, were being tagged as grebo by the music press, alongside Gaye Bikers on Acid and Pop Will Eat Itself, much to the chagrin of Edwards. He thought the name had nothing to do with Jesus Jones, having heard it through Crazyhead, who were from Leicester where it was used by school children. Edwards theorised that since Crazyhead were also on Food Records that Jesus Jones would be given the term too.

The Food Christmas EP 1989 was released on 27 November 1990; it featured Jesus Jones covering "I Don't Want That Kind of Love" by Crazyhead, while Diesel Park West covered "Info Freako". The band ended the year and decade with a show at the Town and Country Club to a crowd of 2,200. They signed to American-based EMI imprint SBK Records, which had plenty of chart success with its acts Vanilla Ice and Wilson Phillips in 1990. The label's radio promoter Mike Mena was annoyed that he had no alternative bands on the roster to work with; when he raised this with senior promoter Daniel Glass, the latter told him to search for those kind of acts. After having no luck courting Nick Cave and Screaming Trees, he came across Jesus Jones. Though they were unknown in the US, Food Records had an option to release its albums with any label in the United States provided it was a part of EMI. Mena thought the band would be perfect to aid in diversifying their roster and pestered chairman Charles Koppelman about them: "Quite frankly, I think he said yes to shut me up". The label would release Liquidizer in the US on 4 June 1990, with "Broken Bones" and the "I Don't Want That Kind of Love" cover as bonus tracks. "Move Mountains", "Never Enough" and "Info Freako" subsequently received significant airplay from alternative radio stations, while the video for "Never Enough" similarly began receiving airplay on MTV's 120 Minutes.

=== Reissues and related releases ===
A two-CD and DVD set of Liquidizer was released in 2014, collecting various B-sides, remixes and live performances. The regular version of the album, alongside 2014 bonus material and the addition of more demos, was included on the career-spanning box set Some of the Answers in 2022. It was re-pressed on vinyl through Demon Records in 2022. The band performed the album in its entirety for a one-off show in 2013 to commemorate the closure of Bull & Gate. It was filmed and released as a CD-and-DVD set that same year. In 2019, the band re-recorded four of the album's tracks, namely "Move Mountains", "All the Answers", "Bring It on Down" and "Someone to Blame", for release as the EP Liquidizer 2019.

"Never Enough", "What's Going On", "Info Freako", "Bring It on Down" and "One for the Money" were featured on the compilation album The Greatest (1998). "Never Enough", "All the Answers", "Info Freako" and "Bring It on Down" were included on the compilation Never Enough (The Best of Jesus Jones) (2002). "Move Mountains", "The Real World", "Song 13" and "Too Much to Learn" were featured on the compilation The Collection – A Selection of Band Favourites and Rarities (2011). "Move Mountains", "Never Enough", "All the Answers", "Song 13", "Info Freako" and "Bring It on Down" were featured on the compilation Zeroes and Ones – The Best Of (2022).

== Reception ==
Professional ratings
Review scores
Source	Rating
AllMusic	4/5 stars
The Encyclopedia of Popular Music	3/5 stars
MusicHound Rock: The Essential Album Guide	2.5/5 stars
The Rolling Stone Album Guide	2.5/5 stars

Critics generally praised Liquidizer's songwriting and mix of samples. Raggett wrote that "it's the breadth which makes Liquidizer a thrilling experience, even if the end results are oddly enough one-dimensional: instantly catchy power pop fed through industrial, techno, and hip-hop approaches, topped off with Mike Edwards' confident bark". Gary Graff and Doug Brod of Trouser Press said that the album being "basically a set of variations on one brilliant song ('Move Mountains') shouldn't discourage potential disciples. Judicious CD track programming is recommended". Chicago Tribune's Chris Heim wrote that Jesus Jones incorporate "some of the most sophisticated and subtle samples to appear on record", admitting that it was "hard to pinpoint where instruments end and samples begin". Steve Hochman of Los Angeles Times praised the meshing of different styles, making it "one of the more arresting efforts of [the] year"; Wright wrote that while it could be "celebrated for being ‘retro’, [it] manages to sound timeless". Spin writer Robin Reinhardt called it "mesmerizing. A trip through time taking hold of your conscience, refusing to let go". Nick Duerden in The Rough Guide to Rock wrote that the distorted vocals, roaring guitars, and mutant melody lines instantly made this a favourite with those who though themselves daring", referring to it was the band's best release. The Rolling Stone Album Guide called the album "a hodgepodge of stale ingredients in a bland, if colorful, casing."

Liquidizer peaked at number 32 in the UK Albums Chart. "Info Freako" and "Never Enough" both charted at number 42 on the UK Singles Chart, while "Bring It Down" reached number 46. Melody Maker, NME and Sounds all included "Info Freako" in the top 10 on their respective lists of the best singles of the year.

== Track listing ==
All songs written by Mike Edwards.

Side one

1. "Move Mountains" – 3:20
2. "Never Enough" – 2:41
3. "The Real World" – 3:03
4. "All the Answers" – 3:48
5. "What's Going On" – 3:04
6. "Song 13" – 4:05

Side two

7. "Info Freako" – 2:51
8. "Bring It on Down" – 2:31
9. "Too Much to Learn" – 3:02
10. "What Would You Know?" – 3:55
11. "One for the Money" – 2:56
12. "Someone to Blame" – 4:07

== Personnel ==
Personnel per 2014 edition booklet.

Jesus Jones

- Mike Edwards (credited as Jesus H. Jones) – vocals, guitar
- Jerry de Borg – guitar
- Iain Baker (credited as Barry D) – samples
- Al Doughty (credited as Al Jaworski) – bass
- Simon "Gen" Mathews – drums, samples

Production and design

- Craig Leon – producer (all except track 7)
- Mike Edwards – producer (track 7)
- Nick Davies – mixing (tracks 4 and 8)
- Michael J. Ade – engineer
- Trevor Rogers – front photography
- Christian Thompson – back photography
- Stylorouge – design

== See also ==
- This Is the Day...This Is the Hour...This Is This! – the 1989 album by Pop Will Eat Itself
- 101 Damnations – the 1990 debut album by contemporaries Carter the Unstoppable Sex Machine

== Bibliography ==
=== AV media and books ===
- Baker, Iain (2022). Zeroes and Ones – The Best Of (booklet). Jesus Jones. Demon Records. EDSL0116.
- Cavanagh, David (2000). The Creation Records Story: My Magpie Eyes are Hungry for the Prize. London: Virgin Publishing. ISBN 1-85227-775-0.
- DeCurtis, Anthony; George-Warren, Holly; Henke, James, eds. (1992). The Rolling Stone Album Guide. Random House. ISBN 9780679737292.
- Duerden, Nick (2003). "Jesus Jones". In Buckley, Peter (ed.). The Rough Guide to Rock. London: Rough Guides. ISBN 978-1-84353-105-0. Archived from the original on 22 March 2023.
- Durchholz, Daniel; Graff, Gary, eds. (1999). MusicHound Rock: The Essential Album Guide. MusicHound. Visible Ink Press. ISBN 9781578590612.
- Edwards, Mike (2019). Death Threats from an Eight-Year-Old. Scout Media. ISBN 978-1-7330740-2-5.
- Harris, John (2004) [2003]. The Last Party – Britpop, Blair and the Demise of English Rock. London: Harper Perennial. ISBN 978-0-00-713473-1.
- Larkin, Colin (2007). "Jesus Jones". The Encyclopedia of Popular Music (5th concise ed.). Omnibus Press. ISBN 978-0-85712-595-8. Archived from the original on 22 March 2023.
- Pegg, Nicholas (2016). The Complete David Bowie (revised and updated ed.). London: Titan Books. ISBN 978-1-78565-365-0.
- Schuftan, Craig (2012). Entertain Us – The Rise and Fall of Alternative Rock in the Nineties. ABC Books. ISBN 9780730497561. Archived from the original on 22 March 2023.

=== Journals and magazines ===
- Burns, Brian, ed. (29 June 1990). "MTV" (PDF). The Network Forty (18).
- Dalton, David, ed. (11 February 1990a). "New Singles" (PDF). Music Week. ISSN 0265-1548.
- Dalton, David, ed. (24 June 1990b). "New Singles" (PDF). Music Week. ISSN 0265-1548.
- Dalton, David, ed. (9 September 1990c). "New Singles" (PDF). Music Week. ISSN 0265-1548.
- Dalton, David, ed. (30 September 1990d). "New Albums" (PDF). Music Week. ISSN 0265-1548.
- Dalton, David, ed. (25 November 1990e). "New Singles" (PDF). Music Week. ISSN 0265-1548.
- Mena, Mike (1 May 1998). "Record Action" (PDF). FMQB. OCLC 857904873.
- Reinhardt, Robin (February 1990). "Heavy Rotation". Spin. Vol. 5, no. 11. ISSN 0886-3032. Archived from the original on 16 March 2023.
- Silberman, Jeff, ed. (7 October 1994). "Nick Gatfield Named Polydor-U.S. President" (PDF). Network 40 (233).
