= Never Enough: The Best of Jesus Jones =

Never Enough

Compilation album by Jesus Jones
- Released: 27 May 2002
- Recorded: 1989–1997
- Genres: Alternative rock, alternative dance, electronica, industrial rock
- Label: EMI
- Producers: Craig Leon, Martin Phillips, various.

Jesus Jones chronology
London (2001)	Never Enough (2002)	Culture Vulture (2004)

Professional ratings
Review scores
Source	Rating
AllMusic	4/5 stars

Never Enough: The Best of Jesus Jones is a compilation album/greatest hits album by British alternative rock/dance band Jesus Jones, released by the band's former record label EMI on 27 May 2002.

The band's previous album London was released on Mi5 Recordings. For this album, EMI could not obtain the rights to the Mi5 recordings by the band and thus no songs from that album feature on this album.

Although mainly a greatest hits album, some songs which were never singles feature on disc one. Disc two was a bonus disc on initial copies and is entirely made up of remixes of songs by the band originally either B-sides or 12" singles.

One new song, "Come on Home", features at the end of disc one. This had been previously unreleased and recorded some time before release.

== Track listing ==
=== Never Enough ===
1. "Info Freako" - 2:49
2. "Never Enough" - 2:41
3. "Bring it on Down" - 2:37
4. "Move Mountains" (Ben Chapman 7" Mix) - 3:21 (This was only released originally as a live single)
5. "All the Answers" - 3:48 (Not a single originally, instead an album track on Liquidizer)
6. "Real, Real, Real" (7" Mix Rhythm) - 3:06
7. "International Bright Young Thing" - 3:17
8. "Who, Where, Why?" (7" Crisis Mix) - 3:08 (The original album version on Doubt was not the single, instead the Crisis Mix was)
9. "Right Here, Right Now" - 3:09
10. "Blissed" - 4:49 (Not a single originally, instead an album track on Doubt)
11. "The Devil You Know" (Single Edit) - 3:48
12. "Zeroes and Ones" - 3:24
13. "The Right Decision" - 3:37
14. "Idiot Stare" (Not a single originally, instead an album track on Perverse)
15. "The Next Big Thing" - 4:03
16. "Chemical #1" - 3:26
17. "They're Out There" - 4:02 (Not a single originally, instead an album track on Already)
18. "February" - 6:42 (Not a single originally, instead an album track on Already)
19. "Come on Home" - 3:53 (Previously unreleased. Also released as a promotional single in 2002)

=== Disc two (Bonus disc) ===
1. "Info Sicko" - 4:50
2. "Enough" - 3:22 (Sometimes subtitled "Never Enough")
3. "Beat it Down" - 4:23
4. "Move Mountains" (Ben Chapman Mix) - 5:04 (7" Mix on Disc One)
5. "Right Here Right Now" (The Martyn Philips Mix) - 5:47
6. "Real Real Real" (Paul Harding "Luxury" 12" Mix) - 7:00 (Originally a 12" single)
7. "Ibyt" - 5:48
8. "Who? Where? Why?" (12 Foot Mix) - 5:25
9. "The Devil You Know" (Satellite Over Tehran Mix) - 5:42
10. "The Right Decision" (Moody Reconstruction Mix) - 6:38
11. "Zeroes and Ones" (The Prodigy vs. Jesus Jones) - 5:43 (The "vs." subtitle is given on the album and on the original 1993 version on Zeroes and Ones. This is actually the name of the artist though, with "Zeroes and Ones" being the song title alone)
12. "Zeroes and Ones" (Aphex Twin Reconstruction #1 Mix) - 8:00

=== Original releases ===
Disc one:

- Tracks 1–5 originally on Liquidizer
- Tracks 6–10 originally on Doubt
- Tracks 11–14 originally on Perverse
- Tracks 15–18 originally on Already
- Track 19 is originally from this album

Disc two:

- Track 1 originally from "Info Freako"
- Track 2 originally from "Never Enough"
- Track 3 originally from Scratched
- Track 4 originally from Liquidzer
- Tracks 5, 6, 8 originally from Doubt
- Track 7 originally from "International Bright Young Thing"
- Tracks 9–12 originally from Perverse

== Personnel ==
- Nick Davies - Mixing
- Richard Norris - Engineer
- Martin Phillipps - Producer, Engineer
- Andy Ross - A&R
- Alan Winstanley - Producer, Mixing
- Liam Howlett - Remix Producer
- Michael J. Ade - Engineer
- Nigel Reeve - Compilation, A&R
- Andrew Day - Photography
- Ben Chapman - Mixing
- Clive Langer - Producer, Mixing
- Craig Leon - Producer
- Aphex Twin - Remixing
- Chris Blair - Mastering
- Ian Curnow - Producer, Mixing, Remixing
- Spike Drake - Mixing Engineer
- Mike Edwards - Producer, Compilation, Mixing
- John Fryer - Mixing
- Clive Goddard - Engineer
- Phil Harding - Producer, Remixing, Mixing
