= Perverse (album) =

Studio album by Jesus Jones
- Released: 25 January 1993
- Recorded: 1991–92, London
- Genres: Alternative rock; techno; industrial
- Length: 44:51
- Labels: Food; SBK; RT Industries (current)
- Producer: Warne Livesey

Jesus Jones chronology
Doubt (1991)	Perverse (1993)	Already (1997)

Singles from Perverse
- 1. "The Devil You Know" Released: December 1992; 2. "The Right Decision" Released: April 1993; 3. "Zeroes and Ones" Released: July 1993

Perverse is the third studio album by British rock band Jesus Jones, released in 1993 on Food Records. After their international success following the release of Doubt (1991), Jesus Jones, especially band leader Mike Edwards, conceived Perverse as a darker, more contemporary album. Fusing rave and techno music into more traditional rock and pop song structures, the album is heavier than its predecessors with a much greater inclusion of industrial music and features lyrics that concern the future. Edwards wrote the lyrics of the album during the band's 1991 tour, using a Roland W-30 sampler to develop songs in their earliest stages.

According to Trouser Press, Perverse "enjoys the historical distinction of being the first album recorded entirely (except for Edwards' vocals) on computer." The band recorded the entire album onto floppy disks in Edwards' house, which were then used on his computer to turn the music into "zeroes and ones". Edwards described it as "the second rock album of the nineties," after The Young Gods' T.V. Sky, due to both albums embracing full-on computer technology. Although the band were ridiculed at the time for the recording process, it later became an influential technique.

Upon its release, Perverse peaked at number 6 on the UK Albums Chart and was the start of the band's declining fortunes, although it still yielded three top 40 singles, "The Devil You Know", which also reached number 1 on the Modern Rock Tracks Chart, "The Right Decision" and "Zeroes and Ones" still making the album quite successful. The album received both mixed and positive reviews at the time, with some critics finding the album's production clattered, but later reviews have been more favourable, and some have posed the album as the band's best work. An extensive deluxe edition of the album was released in November 2014.

== Background ==
With their second album Doubt, Jesus Jones became internationally successful, thanks to hit singles such as "Right Here, Right Now", which reached number 2 on the US Billboard 200, "International Bright Young Thing", which reached number 7 on the UK Singles Chart, and "Real, Real, Real," which reached number 4 on the US Billboard 200. According to music critic Stephen Thomas Erlewine, the album's best moments "showed that sample-driven dance club music could comfortably fit into pop music." For the album's follow-up, Perverse, Jesus Jones, especially band leader, lyricist and vocalist Mike Edwards and keyboardist Iain Baker, decided to venture further into the technological side of recording music. Erlewine described Edwards' aim for Perverse as "his mission to make techno palatable for the pop masses."

Edwards and keyboardist Iain Baker felt that, despite living in a "very technological society", rock music had "stayed still" since the 1970s by not embracing current technology: "Technology gives musicians so much opportunity to vary what they do. It's unbelievable and appalling that they don't use it. [...] And it's not that by using technology you lose the warmth and humanity of acoustic instruments, because you don't. You can still create a warm and human sound. The Young Gods did it on the L'eau rouge album and the Aphex Twin is doing it now." Baker cited a song on Aphex Twin's then-new album Surfing on Sine Waves (1993), released under the Polygon Window moniker, as "doing just that" and cited him as "a true pioneer in music."

== Production ==
=== Writing ===
Band leader and vocalist Mike Edwards is the sole composer and arranger on Perverse. On previous albums, Edwards wrote complete versions of songs, and sent virtually complete demos to the rest of the band, who would then interpret the material in "their own unique way." However, on Perverse, he deliberately attempted to write what he felt was necessary for the music, and disregarded how it would sound live. He commented, "I remember writing "Who? Where? Why?" on the last album, thinking, damn, there's two guitarists, I've got to put a second guitar part in there. That becomes limiting, so on this record, I took a linear, very fascistic approach: 'this is the song, nothing else matters'. There were songs on the album where members of the band didn't play."

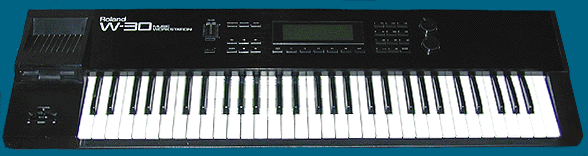
Most of the songs on Perverse were first worked on with a Roland W-30.

Using a Roland W-30 sampler, which Edwards referred to as his "sketch pad," most of the songs on Perverse began as 15 second sketches that Edwards had "written in hotel bedrooms on Jesus Jones' last tour." Despite having written all the band's previous songs on guitar, Edwards wrote most of the songs on Perverse using a keyboard. In the words of Jon Lewin in Making Music, "he says because he knows the guitar so well, it keeps leading him back to the same riffs and chords. But as a two-fingered 'keyboard idiot', Mike found himself continually discovering new harmonies and intervals."

Edwards used two different songwriting methods for the album, the self-described "collade effect": "Get a sample you really like, a musical phrase or just one sound you can make into a musical phrase. Make it do something you enjoy, then add an extra instrument on top, something that sets off the adrenalin, and then just keep collaging until at some point you think 'structure'," and the "cire perdu" method which "he likens to wax-loss casting, where a sculptor's original wax model melts away in the casting process to leave a perfect mould. Simply, he works up a version of a piece of music he likes, then builds his own song on top of that."

=== Recording ===
"The band don’t even play on it. Everything they did was chopped, plugged, fed and squeezed into computers and came out the other side in Zeroes and Ones. For the whole album existed only in frequencies. There was no such thing as bass on the record - only 20hz to 4khz. And guitars becomes 300hz to 8khz."

— Mark Reed of Drowned in Sound

Edwards' aim for recording Perverse was to take the techniques and 'attitudes' of techno, a genre he viewed as the "most progressive and creative form of popular music at the moment," but use them to create a rock album. He chose this method partially as a concept and partially as he believed creating a rock album with this method would be a success. He told one journalist, "ultimately it made things more interesting for me as a writer, mostly because of the degree of editability at every stage of what you do - notes, timing, sounds - as long as the data exists, it's all changeable."

One of the first ever albums to be wholly recorded through a computer, the music on Perverse was recorded onto floppy disks over two and a half months from 1991–92 at Edwards' house in north London, and was produced at London's Think Studios. The album cost almost £100,000, almost five times as much as Doubt, and was produced by Warne Livesey. Edwards summed up the recording sessions: "We did it in a classic techno way. I have an Atari and Cubase. I'd write all the songs on it, and the rest of the band would come in and play all their parts into the computer, using MIDI guitars and drum pads."

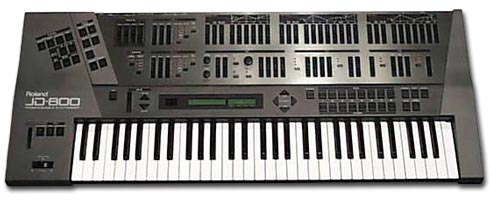
Perverse makes prominent usage of the Roland JD-800.

While recording the album, Edwards "turned every song into binary codes, then fiddled with them until he had achieved a suitably hi-tech noise." With the entire album being recorded into the computer, "the whole album only existed in frequencies." Jerry de Borg's guitar is presented at 300 Hz to 8 kHz. The Roland GR-50 guitar synth was used to load the album's guitar parts into the computer. Al Jarwoski's bass, meanwhile, became 20 Hz to 4 kHz, and as such, "there was no such thing as bass on the record," writes journalist Mark Reed. The rest of the band are also credited unusually on Perverse; the band's percussionist Gen for "drum type sounds," Iain Baker as "omnipresent," and Mike Edwards himself for "first generation (unsampled) vocals, and sole writer."

The album is shaped by the prominent usage of the Roland JD-800 synthesiser, which follows each previous Jesus Jones album in that the others also used a new piece of technology which shaped the music. When Edwards first started writing the songs on Perverse, he envisioned the album as containing "these big buzzy synths, basically the equivalent of heavy metal guitars, but more exciting because less clichéd", and felt the JD-800 "was perfect for manufacturing hard, unusual sounds. The sounds I made on the JD are always the ones that our sound guy has to turn down." With Edwards having sequenced the album's music on his Cubase, Livesey continued to work on "structures, editing sounds, putting in subtle wooshes and swishes," which Edwards described as "enormous attention to detail." Edwards' vocals, which were recorded after the music, are the only live element to Perverse.

In a 1992 interview prior to release, Edwards christened the album "the second rock album of the nineties," after T.V. Sky (1992) by The Young Gods, recorded in a similar fashion. Explaining this to Graham Reid of Elsewhere, he said "That's not me blowing my own trumpet. What I'm saying is, for us to make an album that reflects the society we‘re living in we use computer technology. That’s a very natural thing to do - why isn’t everyone? Why is it the retro stuff is getting the front covers when new music is what it’s supposed to be about? I’ just trying to draw attention to the fact nothing is going on - and everybody knows it."

== Composition ==
=== Music ===
Compared to Doubt, Perverse is a much darker, broodier album, and has been described as the band's heaviest album. Stephen Thomas Erlewine of AllMusic, describing Perverse as an artistic expanding of the band's sound, called the album "a synthesis of techno/rave dance music with traditional pop/rock songs and structures." Meanwhile, Douglas D. Keller of The Tech felt that, although many of the songs contain distinctly techno elements, the album itself is not overall a techno recording: "Songs such as 'Idiot Stare' make extensive use of repeating drum tracks, but there are fast and slow movements within the song which add a richness to this and other tracks that is missing in most techno singles." The band continued to be influenced by house music on the album, and according to Q, "hardcore runs through much of the LP, most notably on 'Zeroes and Ones' and 'Spiral'."

According to Graham Reid, samples are either used as the starting point for the music or for further enhancement. Although the album shares Doubt's idea of extensive sampling, synthesisers and drum-style sounds, Perverse uses them to curate a driving sound. Edwards performs both "textured lead and backing vocals" on the album which are interwoven with each other; he felt backing vocals are integral as they heavily contribute towards "the feel of a song," which is why the band treated them as "another instrument to use in the mix," and felt that "lack of confidence" is key to the album's vocal sound. Compared to the Young Gods, a primary influence on the album, Baker felt the music on Perverse was not as leftfield in style.

"Zeroes and Ones" is dominated by "driving synth pattern, heavy rhythm section and big guitar riffs." "The Devil You Know" features tingly elements resembling Eastern music, starting with a notably high-pitched Iranian instrument. The synthesized basslines on "From Love To War" was influenced by LFO, whose 1991 album Frequencies was Edwards' favourite of that year. "Yellow Brown" and "Spiral" also bear a progressive rock influence. The former song features, as Simon Reynolds described them, "baleful, treated noises, and looped samples of voice low in the mix." "The Right Decision" is buoyed by "a firm, unfettered groove." While Edwards was listening to a lot of proto-ambient techno, he conceived "Spiral" as an attempt to create a piece of music "in a very techno way but without the beat, still have all the really powerful elements without the dictatorial thing of the beat. It had to have a sinister quality so we recorded it fast, varispeeded up, so my voice had that low demonic quality."

=== Lyrics ===
Edwards wrote each of the songs on the album "with a hint of his vision of the future included." Perverse also occasionally reveals contradictory lyrics, such as how "Magazine" appears to celebrate "the distortion of current evens in the media" while "Don't Believe It" is "a biting criticism of the media." In the album's liner notes, "Don't Believe It" is described with the caption: ""May '92, with a little ignorance and media manipulation, there is a whipping boy for every occasion. On our side, truth, decency, and the right way to talk, on the other side, our perfect enemy out for revenge."

According to The Tech, "Zeroes and Ones", whose name is a reference to the binary code and the album's recording method, concerns "the increasing prominence of computers in daily life, from pocket calculators and shopping at home to missile guiding and virtual sex. The song is both a celebration of the power of computers and a warning about the control that they exerts over our lives." "The Devil You Know", an example of Edwards' "collade effect" songwriting, was built from his "collage method." As for "The Right Decision", Edwards explained to Making Music, "I worked hard on the chords for this one. What I attempted to do was write a great single without using the classic format. After a short while, I realise it has become verse/chorus/verse/chorus, but it's hidden because the sections are different and the two bridges have different chords." "Magazine" refers to magazines as "the fast food of the information medium." "Spiral" is anchored by a "thematic link" shared between its music and lyrics.

== Release ==
Perverse was released on 25 January 1993 by Food Records in the United Kingdom and SBK Records in the United States. Upon release, it reached number 6 on the UK Albums Chart, and stayed on the chart for four weeks, a departure from the number 1 peak achieved by Doubt. It also charted at number 59 on the US Billboard 200 in February 1993. As the band's commercial momentum never recovered, Pitchfork later included Perverse in their list of "ten career-killing albums" from the 1990s. Two copies of the mask on the album cover are known to exist, one owned by Edwards. During interviews given to promote the album, keyboardist Baker accompanied Edwards, unlike with earlier band promotion, because Baker was the band's "techno expert."

"The Devil You Know" was released as the album's first single in December 1992, reaching number 10 on the UK Singles Chart. It was followed by second single "The Right Decision", which reached number 36 on the UK Singles Chart and stayed there for three weeks. "Zeroes and Ones" was the final single, which reached number 30 upon its release as a single in July. The two CD singles for "Zeroes and Ones" featured radical remixes of the song by artists who influenced Perverse such as the Prodigy and Aphex Twin, the latter of whose "Aphex Twin Reconstruction Mix #2" later featured on his remix compilation 26 Mixes for Cash (2003). On the US Modern Rock Tracks chart, "The Devil You Know" reached number 1 and "The Right Decision" reached number 12.

== Reception and legacy ==
Professional ratings
Review scores
Source	Rating
AllMusic	4/5 stars
The Tech	(favourable)
Trouser Press	(mixed)

Perverse was originally released to mixed reviews. Simon Reynolds of Melody Maker found the band's "rock must engage with techno" idea engaging, but ultimately said the album "quickly reverts to type." Trouser Press were similarly mixed, feeling the album "[pumps] up the electronic fuzz tones and industrial guitar riffs at the expense of songs' character" on most of the songs." Douglas D. Keller of The Tech was more favourable, saying Perverse is "an engaging album with very contemporary ideas and the potential to shape the course of alternative and techno in the near future."

Later reviews have been more favourable; in a retrospective review, Stephen Thomas Erlewine of AllMusic rated the album four stars out of five, saying that it is "an ambitious album that works sporadically," saying that, although "too often, the hooks are submerged beneath layers of computerized noise and aren't strong enough to pull themselves out," "when Perverse clicks, Jesus Jones gives the listener an idea of how enjoyable a successful marriage of techno and rock could be." Mark Reed of Drowned in Sound, writing in 2002, called the album the band's "major leap forward," and cited its recording approach as innovative: "At the time (and now) the band were lambasted for it. Now everyone does it." Meanwhile, writing in 2014, David Wilson of Get Ready to Rock noted that Perverse is often seen as the band's creative peak.

Shane Pinnegar of 100Percent Rock Magazine, in a 2015 interview with Edwards, described the album as good, but noted "it isn’t remembered as being as quintessentially ‘of its time’ as Doubt is," believing this to be due to its topical themes. Edwards replied, "yeah, obviously that approach stuck with me, which is why Perverse not only sounds the way it does, but has the lyrical themes that it does – including the now quaintly amusing idea that the internet might actually be quite an interesting thing! 'Zeroes and Ones', the song, is very hard to sing with a straight face these days."

=== Deluxe edition ===
Perverse was remastered and re-released as a deluxe edition on 17 November 2014 by Edsel Records alongside the band's other albums. The release, which is packaged to resemble a hardback book, contains 2 CDs and a DVD, comprising "radio sessions, rare tracks, demos and sought-after mixes plus the Bonus DVD featuring videos and live footage." The deluxe edition was favourably assessed by David Wilson of Get Ready to Rock in a review of all the band's deluxe editions, who rated the release four stars out of five.

== Track listing ==
All tracks written by Mike Edwards.

1. "Zeroes and Ones" – 3:24
2. "The Devil You Know" (Edwards, Henry Kriger) – 4:31
3. "Get a Good Thing" – 3:23
4. "From Love to War" – 3:49
5. "Yellow Brown" – 3:23
6. "Magazine" – 2:46
7. "The Right Decision" – 3:36
8. "Your Crusade" – 3:30
9. "Don't Believe It" – 3:45
10. "Tongue Tied" – 3:16
11. "Spiral" – 4:30
12. "Idiot Stare" – 5:10

== Charts ==
Chart (1993)	Peak position
Australian Albums (ARIA Charts)	32
