= Never Enough =

Never Enough may refer to:

== Albums ==
- Never Enough (Patty Smyth album), 1987
- Never Enough (Melissa Etheridge album), 1992
- Never Enough (Public Access T.V. album), 2016
- Never Enough (Daniel Caesar album), 2023
- Never Enough (Parker McCollum album), 2023
- Never Enough (Turnstile album), 2025
- Never Enough: The Best of Jesus Jones, a 2002 album by Jesus Jones
- Never Enough EP, a 2015 EP by Wild Adriatic

== Songs ==
- "Never Enough" (Loren Allred song), 2017
- "Never Enough" (The Cure song), 1990
- "Never Enough" (Boris Dlugosch song), 2001
- "Never Enough" (Five Finger Death Punch song), 2008
- "Never Enough" (Kiss song), 2009
- "Never Enough" (Koda Kumi song), 2017
- Never Enough (Rex Orange County song)
- "Never Enough" (Six60 song), 2019
- "Never Enough" (Tarja song), 2013
- "Never Enough", musical number from The Greatest Showman, 2017
- "Never Enough" (Turnstile song), 2025
- "Never Enough", a song by Dream Theater from 2005 album Octavarium
- "Never Enough", a song by Eminem, featuring Nate Dogg and 50 Cent, from his album Encore
- "Never Enough", a song by Epica for their 2007 album The Divine Conspiracy
- "Never Enough", a song by Jesus Jones, from their 1989 album Liquidizer
- "Never Enough", a song by Kid Rock, from his 2022 album Bad Reputation
- "Never Enough", a song by L.A. Guns, 1989 from the album Cocked & Loaded
- "Never Enough", a song by The Monkees, from their 1996 album, Justus
- "Never Enough", a song by Mudvayne from The New Game
- "Never Enough", a song by One Direction from their 2015 album Made in the A.M.
- "Never Enough", a song by Papa Roach from Infest
- "Never Enough", a song by Poisonblack from the album Lust Stained Despair
- "Never Enough", a song by This Condition, 2009
- "Never Enough", a song by Toto from Kingdom of Desire
- "Never Enough", a song by Wage War from Deadweight

== Books ==
- Never Enough: Donald Trump and the Pursuit of Success, a biography of Donald Trump by Michael D'Antonio
- Never Enough: The Story of The Cure, a book by Jeff Apter; see Pornography (album) § Legacy
- Never Enough by Joe McGinniss, about the life and murder of Robert Kissel
