= Bright young things (disambiguation) =

The Bright young things were an aristocratic social group of the 1920s.

Bright Young Things may also refer to:

- Bright Young Things (film), 2003 British comedy-drama film
- "Bright Young Things" (song), 2006 song by the Pet Shop Boys
- "International Bright Young Thing", 1991 song by Jesus Jones
