= Passages (Jesus Jones album) =

Studio album by Jesus Jones
- Released: 20 April 2018
- Length: 39:08
- Label: Jesus Jones Recording, PledgeMusic
- Producer: Mike Edwards

Jesus Jones chronology
Culture Vulture (2004)	Passages (2018)

Passages is the sixth album by the British alternative rock band Jesus Jones, released independently in 2018 through PledgeMusic.

== Track listing ==
All songs written by Mike Edwards.

No.	Title	Length
1.	"Where Are All the Dreams?"	3:50
2.	"Suck It Up"	3:04
3.	"Chemistry"	3:34
4.	"Fall"	5:02
5.	"Rounding Out the Square Holes"	3:31
6.	"How's This Even Going Down?"	4:08
7.	"So Welcome"	4:17
8.	"Grateful"	3:46
9.	"One Day at a Time"	2:38
10.	"Stripped"	5:18
Total length:		39:08

== Personnel ==
Jesus Jones

- Mike Edwards - vocals, guitar
- Jerry De Borg - guitar, trumpet
- Alan Doughty - bass
- Iain Baker - keyboards
- Gen Mathews - drums
