= Live at the Marquee =

Live at the Marquee may refer to:

- Live at the Marquee (festival), an annual music festival in Cork, Ireland
- Live at the Marquee (Dream Theater album), 1993
- Live at the Marquee (Gary Moore album), 1980
- Live at the Marquee (King Crimson album), 1998
- Live at the Marquee (Girl album), 2001
- Live at the Marquee 1980, a live album by British rock band Atomic Rooster
- Live at the Marquee Theatre, an album by The Format
- Live at the Marquee (DVD), a 2003 video album by Jesus Jones
- Live at the Marquee (Jesus Jones album), 2005
- Live at the Marquee (Osibisa album), 1984
- Live at the Marquee (Nathan Carter album)
- "Live at the Marquee", a song by The Vapors on their album Magnets
