= Disco Zombies =

- Origin: Leicester, England
- Genres: Punk rock, post-punk
- Years active: 1977–1981, 2011, 2018
- Past members: Andy Ross; Johnny "Guitar" Hawkins; Geoff Dodimead; Andy Fullerton; Dave Henderson; Steve Gerrard; Mark Sutherland

Disco Zombies were a UK punk band of the late 1970s, formed in Leicester.

== History ==
The band formed in Leicester in 1977 by Leicester University students Andy Ross (vocals, guitar), Johnny "Guitar" Hawkins (guitar), Geoff Dodimead (bass guitar), and Andy Fullerton (drums). They expanded to a five-piece with the addition of singer Dave Henderson, formerly of the Blazers. The band's debut EP was the first release on record shop owner Carl Tebbutt's Uptown Records, although its release was delayed after the pressing company closed. The band recorded a session for a local radio station and after several gigs in Leicester, the original line-up came to an end; Hawkins left to complete his studies, to be replaced by Steve Gerrard of the Foamettes, and the band relocated to London. Gerrard soon returned to Leicester to join Farmlife (soon changing their name to The Bomb Party), and was himself replaced by Mark Sutherland.

The band's second single, "Drums Over London", was released on Ross's South Circular Records label, and featured a drum machine replacing the recently departed Fullerton. It was followed by "Here Come the Buts" on Henderson's Dining Out label, which was a minor hit on the UK Independent Chart. The band recorded a further single but it was not released due to lack of funds.

In 1981, Henderson had restarted Dining Out Records, and the band recorded another proposed single, "Where Have You Been Lately Tony Hateley?", but the band split up before it was released.

While these releases made little impact at the time, they later gained cult status among punk collectors.

Henderson and Ross went on to join the short-lived Club Tango. Henderson later worked for Mojo, while Ross went on to launch Food Records

The band reunited for a live show in 2011 and 2018, each time also recorded a new single, the last one with Fullerton back on drums.

Three compilation albums of the band's recordings have been released, the latest and most comprehensive the 2021 double-LP South London Stinks, released on Optic Nerve Records.

== Discography ==
=== Albums ===
- From Spit to Skewer (1980), Corporation Cassettes

Compilations

- Drums Over London (2011), Acute
- Drums Over London, Retro
- South London Stinks (2021), Optic Nerve

=== Singles, EPs ===
- "Drums Over London" (1979), South Circular
- The Invisible E.P. (1979), Uptown/Wizzo
- "Here Come the Buts" (1980), Dining Out – UK Independent no. 40
- "Night of the Big Heat" (2011)
- "Hit" (2018)
- Live at the Music Machine (2020), Cherry Red
