= Jesus Jones =

English alternative rock band

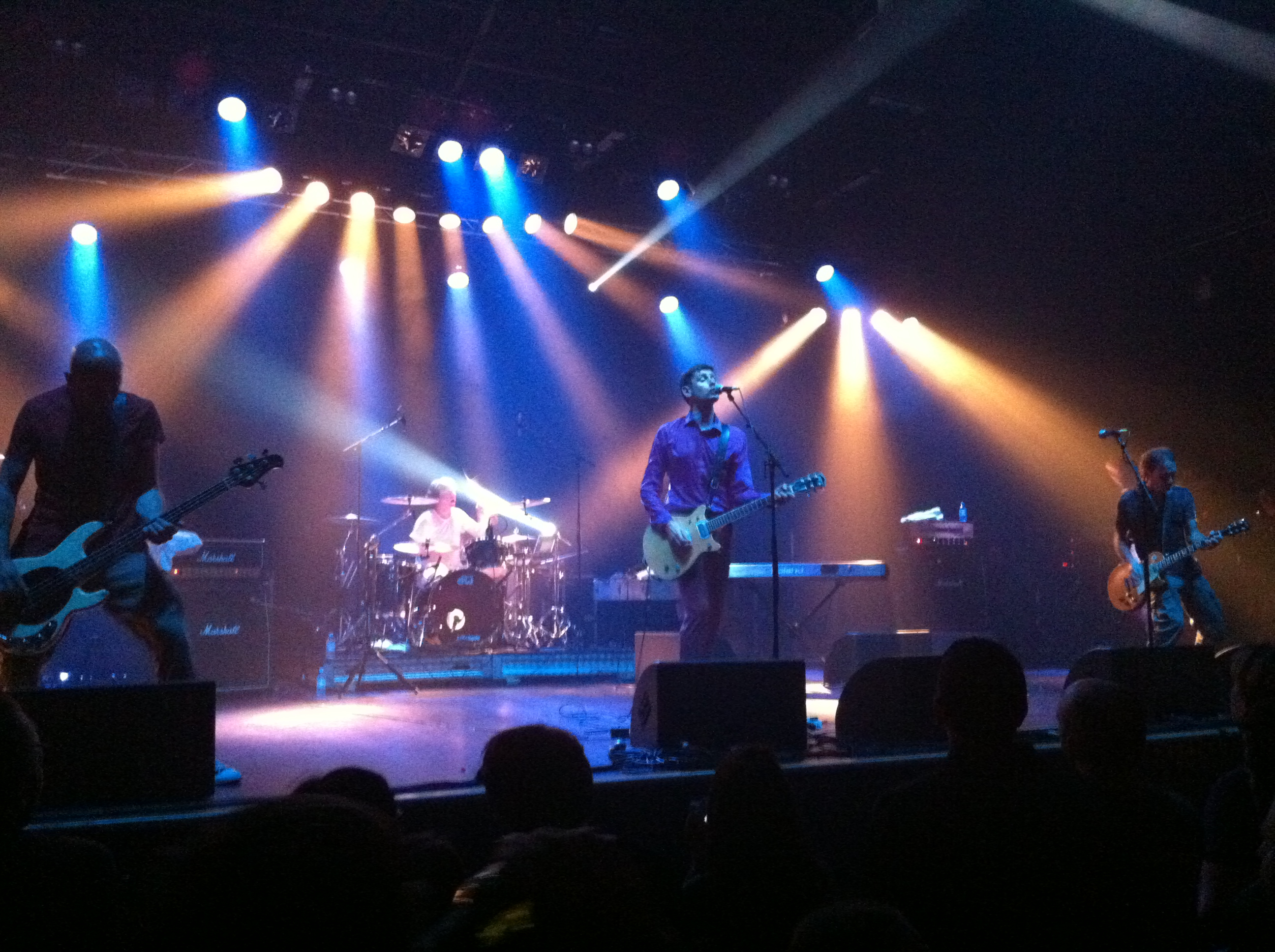
- Jesus Jones performing in 2011

Background information
- Origin: Bradford-on-Avon, Wiltshire, England
- Genres: Alternative rock; grebo; dance-rock; indie dance
- Years active: 1988–present
- Labels: Food; SBK Records; EMI; Liberty; Nebula; Mi5 Recordings/Koch; RT Industries
- Members: Mike Edwards; Jerry De Borg; Al Doughty; Iain Baker; Gen (Simon Matthews)
- Past members: Tony Arthy
- Website: www.jesusjones.com

Jesus Jones are a British alternative rock band from Bradford-on-Avon in Wiltshire, formed in late 1988. Their track "Right Here, Right Now" was an international hit, and was subsequently globally licensed for promotional and advertising campaigns. The single was also nominated for a Grammy Award at the 34th Annual Grammy Awards in 1991, as was its album, Doubt. They also achieved chart success with the songs "Real Real Real", "International Bright Young Thing" and "Info Freako".

== Career ==
=== Liquidizer, Doubt and Perverse (1989–1995) ===
In 1989 Jesus Jones released their debut album Liquidizer, featuring the singles "Info Freako", "Never Enough" and "Bring it on Down", all of which narrowly missed the top 40 in the UK Singles Chart.

In early 1990, Jesus Jones recorded their second album, Doubt, but their record label was forced to delay its release until the beginning of 1991, as they had to go back on tour. The album sold well, due to the success of "Right Here, Right Now". The song is about the swift end of the Cold War, and reached No. 2 in the US and No. 31 in the UK. In June 1990, Jesus Jones appeared at the Glastonbury Festival.

Other singles from Doubt included "Real, Real, Real" and "International Bright Young Thing", which became two of their biggest hit singles in the UK, reaching No. 19 and No. 7 respectively in the UK Singles Chart. In 1991, Jesus Jones were the only UK winners when they won the Best New Artist award at the MTV Awards. In April 1991, the British music magazine NME reported that their US tour had sold out before Jesus Jones arrived in the country.

The follow-up to Doubt was Perverse (1993), a darker and more industrial based album, which, though a big seller, did not reach the worldwide hit status of Doubt. Perverse was one of the first rock albums recorded entirely digitally.

=== Already and London (1996–2003) ===
After the release of the Perverse album, Jesus Jones took an extended hiatus and did not return to the recording studio until December 1996. After the recording of their fourth album, drummer Gen left the band before the album was released. They released their fourth album, titled Already, in 1997 after which Jesus Jones and their record label EMI parted company. The final months of the band are chronicled in the PDF book written by Mike Edwards "Death Threats From An 8 Year Old In The Seychelles".

=== Later activities (2004–present) ===
With the exception of the release of the Culture Vulture EP in 2004, the band released no new material between 2001 and 2018. However, in 2010, a series of download albums were released to Amazon.co.uk. The release consisted of six different albums containing "in concert" performances at the BBC, such as London T+C 1991 and London Astoria 1993.

In 2005, the Live at the Marquee DVD was released on Secret Recordings, showing a filmed gig from 2002.

The single "Right Here, Right Now" was resurrected in 2006 as an advertising jingle for the American retailer Kmart, in an image campaign for CBS News, and in promotional advertisements for the now-defunct television channel TechTV. In 2007 Hillary Clinton used the track for her electoral campaign. Ford Motor Company used "Right Here, Right Now" in their 2010 televisual advertising campaign. A cover of the song was also recorded by New Zealand band The Feelers to use in advertising for the 2011 Rugby World Cup. In 2011 the band released The Collection & Other Rarities, which included many of their B-side tracks as well as demos and rarities.

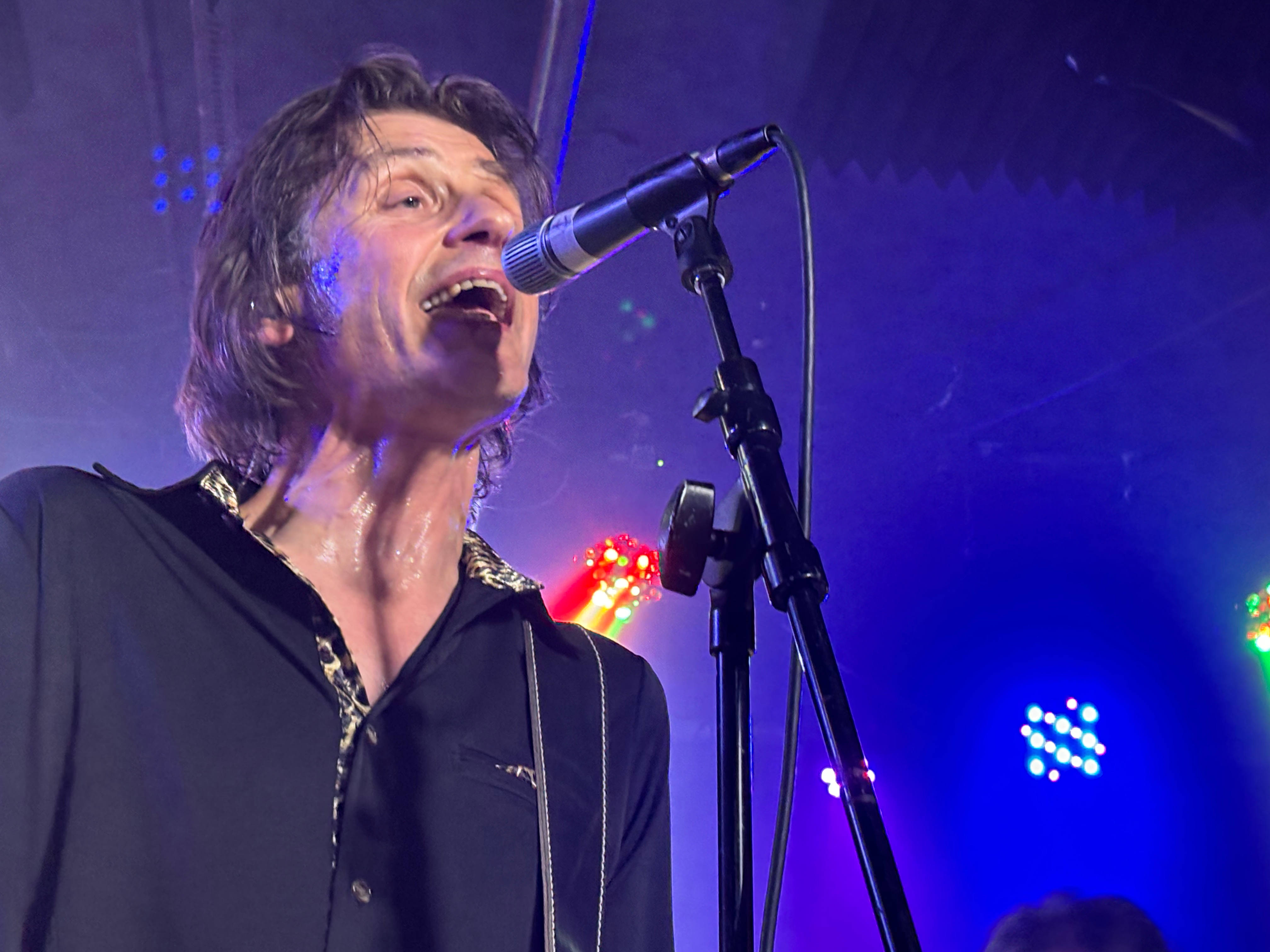
Mike Edwards and the rest of Jesus Jones perform at the Wonder Bar in Asbury Park, New Jersey, on 6 April 2024.

In November 2014, EMI reissued all four of the band's albums in a special CD+DVD bundle. In addition to the original album's tracks the reissues feature radio sessions, long-deleted b-sides, rare remixes and alternate versions. The DVDs include rare live concert footage and other extras.

In a 2015 interview for the online periodical Soot Magazine band leader Mike Edwards acknowledged that, besides re-recording some older tracks with new arrangements, he was in the process of writing material for a new album: "I am writing new stuff – I was actually writing some new material yesterday and I have loads of little bits and pieces ticking over".

Since the mid-2000s, Jesus Jones have continued performing live. In August 2011, the band went on a short tour (dubbed on one poster "The World's Smallest World Tour"), playing three shows in Australia before closing with a show in Japan. In November 2011, the band were due to perform in the UK in Birmingham and London, but the dates were postponed due to bass player Al Doughty being ill. They took place in January 2012. The band also toured the UK in December 2013 as part of The Wonder Stuff's Sleigh The UK tour. In March 2015, the band again returned to Australia and New Zealand for a five city tour.

Jesus Jones released the albums Passages and Voyages in 2018. The singles, "Still Smiling" and "Animal Instinct", were distributed online in 2024. The band's eighth studio album, and first in eight years, Twilight, was released in September 2026.

== Band members ==
- Mike Edwards (born Michael James Edwards, 22 June 1964. London – vocals, guitars, keyboards (1988–present)
- Jerry De Borg (born Jerry de Abela Borg, 30 October 1960, Kentish Town, London) – guitars (1988–present)
- Al Doughty (born Alan Jaworski, 31 January 1966, Plymouth) – bass (1988–present)
- Gary Thatcher - bass on selected dates.
- Iain Baker (born Iain Richard Foxwell Baker, 29 September 1965, Carshalton, Surrey) – keyboards, programming (1988–present)
- Gen (born Simon Edward Robert Matthews, 23 April 1964, Devizes, Wiltshire) – drums, additional percussion (1988–1997 then 2014–present)

Former members

- Tony Arthy – drums (1999–2013)

== Discography ==
=== Studio albums ===
Title	Album details	Peak chart positions										Certifications
Title	Album details	UK	AUS	CAN	EUR	FIN	GER	NED	NZ	SWE	US	Certifications
Liquidizer	Released: 2 October 1989; Label: Food (FOOD3); Formats: LP, CS, CD	32	118	—	—	—	—	—	—	—	—	UK: Silver
Doubt	Released: 26 January 1991; Label: Food (FOOD5); Formats: LP, CS, CD	1	23	35	10	—	—	—	6	—	25	UK: Gold; CAN: Platinum; NZ: Platinum; US: Platinum
Perverse	Released: 25 January 1993; Label: Food (FOOD8); Formats: LP, CS, CD	6	32	38	39	13	96	63	50	29	59	
Already	Released: 18 August 1997; Label: Food (FOOD22); Formats: CS, CD	161	—	—	—	—	—	—	—	—	—	
London	Released: 9 October 2001; Label: Mi5; Formats: CD	—	—	—	—	—	—	—	—	—	—	
Passages	Released: 20 April 2018; Label: Jesus Jones Recordings; Formats: LP, CD, download	—	—	—	—	—	—	—	—	—	—	
Voyages	Released: 9 November 2018; Label: Jesus Jones Recordings; Formats: LP, CD, download	—	—	—	—	—	—	—	—	—	—	
Twilight	Released: 21 September 2026; Label: Jesus Jones Recordings; Formats: LP, CD, download	—	—	—	—	—	—	—	—	—	—	
"—" denotes items that did not chart or were not released in that territory.

=== Compilation albums ===
- 1993 Scratched: Unreleased Rare Tracks & Remixes (Japan only)
- 1999 Greatest Hits
- 2002 Never Enough: The Best of Jesus Jones
- 2011 The Collection: A Selection of Band Favourites and Rarities
- 2018 Zeroes and Ones: The Best of Jesus Jones (2-CD compilation)
- 2022 Some of the Answers (15-CD boxed set)

=== EPs ===
Year	Title	Tracks	Peak chart positions
Year	Title	Tracks	UK
1989	Food Christmas	"I Don't Want That Kind Of Love" (Jesus Jones); "Like Princes Do" (Crazyhead); "Info Freako" (Diesel Park West)	63
2004	Culture Vulture	"Culture Vulture"; "Find The Dial"; "Head In The Sand"; "Halfway House"	—
2016	How's This Even Going Down?	"How's This Even Going Down?"; "Stripped"; "Fall"	—
2016	Suck it Up	Suck it Up"; "Grateful"; "So Welcome"	-
2019	Liquidizer EP	"Move Mountains"; "All The Answers"; "Bring it on Down"; "Someone to Blame"	-
"—" denotes items that did not chart or were not released in that territory.

=== Singles ===
Year	Title	Peak chart positions										Album
Year	Title	UK	AUS	CAN	EUR	FIN	GER	NED	NZ	US	US Alt.	Album
1989	"Info Freako"	42	—	—	—	—	—	—	—	—	—	Liquidizer
1989	"Never Enough"	42	—	—	—	—	—	—	—	—	—	Liquidizer
1989	"Bring It on Down"	46	—	—	—	—	—	—	—	—	—	Liquidizer
1990	"Real Real Real"	19	117	10	48	—	—	59	37	4	26	Doubt
1990	"Right Here, Right Now"	31	35	18	87	13	84	61	29	2	1	Doubt
1990	"International Bright Young Thing"	7	79	58	29	—	—	—	22	—	6	Doubt
1991	"Who? Where? Why?"	21	167	—	82	—	—	—	48	—	—	Doubt
1991	"Right Here, Right Now" (re-issue)	31	—	—	87	—	—	—	—	—	—	Doubt
1992	"The Devil You Know"	10	54	47	34	—	—	77	15	—	1	Perverse
1993	"The Right Decision"	36	184	88	—	—	—	—	—	—	12	Perverse
1993	"Zeroes and Ones"	30	—	—	78	—	—	—	—	—	—	Perverse
1997	"The Next Big Thing"	49	—	—	—	—	—	—	—	—	—	Already
1997	"Chemical No.1"	71	—	—	—	—	—	—	—	—	—	Already
2002	"Nowhere Slow"	—	—	—	—	—	—	—	—	—	—	London
2002	"Come on Home"	—	—	—	—	—	—	—	—	—	—	London
2002	"In the Face of All of This"	—	—	—	—	—	—	—	—	—	—	London
2005	"Right Here Right Now" (Robbie Rivera featuring Jesus Jones)	—	—	—	—	—	—	—	—	—	—	Non-album single
2016	"How's This Even Going Down?"	—	—	—	—	—	—	—	—	—	—	Passages
2016	"Suck it Up"	—	—	—	—	—	—	—	—	—	—	Passages
"—" denotes items that did not chart or were not released in that territory.

=== Video albums ===
- 1991 Big in Alaska

=== Other ===
- 1990 Live (a.k.a. Move Mountains & 4 More) (US-only live EP)
- 1991 Live in Alaska (German-only live VHS)
- 1993 A Perverse Conversation with Jesus Jones (US-only interview promo)
- 1993 Zeroes & Heroes (Double EP)
- 1997 4 Track Sampler for Promo Only (Promo EP)
- 1998 Back 2 Back Hits (US-only 'Best of' with EMF)
- 2002 Never Enough The Best of Jesus Jones (Videos DVD)
- 2005 Live at the Marquee (Live DVD)
- 2008 The Remixes (Remix download album)
- 2010 BBC in Concert 26 February 1991 London T+C
- 2010 BBC in Concert 30 March 1993 London Astoria
- 2013 Liquidizer Live DVD
