= International Bright Young Thing =

1991 single by Jesus Jones

Single by Jesus Jones

from the album Doubt
- B-side: "Maryland"
- Released: 1991
- Genre: Indie dance
- Length: 3:12
- Label: Food
- Songwriter: Mike Edwards
- Producer: Mike Edwards

Jesus Jones singles chronology
"Right Here, Right Now" (1990)	"International Bright Young Thing" (1991)	"Who? Where? Why?" (1991)

"International Bright Young Thing" is a song by British alternative dance band Jesus Jones. It was released in 1991 by Food Records as the third single from their second album, Doubt (1991). The song was included on Jesus Jones's compilation album Never Enough: The Best of Jesus Jones, released in 2002.

"International Bright Young Thing" reached No. 7 on the UK Singles Chart in January 1991, becoming the band's highest-charting single in their home country. It also became a top-30 hit in Ireland and New Zealand. In the United States, the song peaked at No. 6 on the Billboard Modern Rock Tracks chart.

== Credits ==
- Produced by Jesus Jones
- Engineer Darren Allison
- Recorded at Ezee Studios and Matrix Studios in London.

== Charts ==
Chart (1991–1992)	Peak position
Australia (ARIA)	79
Canada Top Singles (RPM)	58
Europe (Eurochart Hot 100)	29
Ireland (IRMA)	16
New Zealand (Recorded Music NZ)	22
UK Singles (Official Charts)	7
UK Airplay (Music Week)	15
US Modern Rock Tracks (Billboard)	6
