= Grass Show =

Grass-Show
- Origin: Sweden
- Genres: Indie rock
- Years active: 1994–2003
- Labels: Food records Parlophone; EMI Svenska; Dorkland; Egging (Japan)
- Past members: Peter Ågren (vocals, guitar); Erik Kinell (vocals, guitar, bass guitar); Andrew Dry (bass guitar); Robert Gehring (guitar, backing vocals); Mattias Moberg (drums)

Grass Show (often written Grass~Show®) was a Britpop-inspired indie band from Sweden, active in the mid- to late-1990s. Originally called The Grass Show, the group released their first single "I Stole Your Girl Away" in Sweden. This was followed by "Illusion" in 1995 and a cover version of the Ace of Base song, "All That She Wants" in 1996. Their debut album Something Smells Good In Stinkville was released in 1996.

The band were then signed to the United Kingdom label Food Records in 1996. The band re-released their album with new artwork and an altered track listing in the United Kingdom. "Sympathetic Television" and "Illusion" were substituted for the b-side "Alice" and the new song "Getting You Out of My Head". Three singles, "Out Of The Void", "1962" and "Freak Show" and were released prior to the album's release in June 1996. None of the singles or the album sold well including a re-release "Out Of The Void". The group were dropped from the label.

The artwork Grass Show's releases on Food Records were notable as they often portrayed imagery of 1950s American families, which were juxtaposed with surreal and absurd elements. For example, the sleeve for the "1962" single has images of families cooking trainers.

In 2001, the group returned with the six track extended play; Vertigo. The EP was subsequently issued in Japan in 2003 with four additional tracks.

== Discography ==
=== Albums ===
Year	Information	Track listing
1996	Something Smells Good In Stinkville: Released: 20 May 1996 (Europe), 16 October 1996 (Japan), June 1997 (UK); Label: Food/EMI; UK Album Chart: #153	1. "Freak Show"; 2. "1962"; 3. "Out of the Void"; 4. "Unreal World"; 5. "Cavemankind"; 6. "All That She Wants"; 7. "Talk Talk Talk"; 8. "Make Love Not War"; 9. "Losing Touch"; 10. "Love 180"; 11. "Sympathetic Television" (Europe and Japan); 12. "Illusion" (Europe and Japan); 13. "Alice" (Japan and UK); 14. "Paralysed" (Japan only); 15. "Getting You Out of My Head" (UK only)
2001	Vertigo: Released 2001 (Europe), 2003 (Japan); Label: Dorkland/Egging Records; Produced by Ronald Blood and Grass Show.	1. "Vertigo"; 2. "Mundane Days"; 3. "This Is Your Life"; 4. "Easy"; 5. "When You're A Boy"; 6. "Face Off"; 7. "Neurotic" (Japan bonus track); 8. "All Of A Sudden" (Japan bonus track); 9. "We're So Sorry" (Japan bonus track); 10. "Daydream Boy" (Japan bonus track); 11. "Vertigo" (Video)

=== Singles ===
Title	Released	UK	SCO
"I Stole Your Girl Away" / "Love 180" (EMI Svenska AB) (as 'The Grass Show')	1994	-	-
"Illusion" / "Unreal World" (EMI)	1995	-	-
"All That She Wants" / "Talk Talk Talk" (EMI)	12 August 1996	-	-
"Out Of The Void" / "Alice" (Food records)	12 October 1996	99	-
"1962" (Food records B00000AP4K)	17 February 1997	53	51
"Freak Show" (Food records B00000AP4M)	19 May 1997	76	89
"Out Of The Void" (Food records B00000AP4P)	11 August 1997	75	77
