= Scout.com =

Internet sports publisher (2001–2017)

- Available in: English
- Founded: 2001
- Dissolved: 2017
- Successor: 247Sports
- Headquarters: United States
- Industry: Digital Media
- Parent: Paramount Global
- Website: www.scout.com

Scout Media was an integrated sports publishing company that produced Internet content covering hundreds of professional and college teams across America. The company was founded in 2001 and was acquired by Fox Sports in 2005. In 2013, Fox Sports sold Scout to North American Membership Group which later rebranded to Scout Media. Scout filed for Chapter 11 bankruptcy in December 2016 and was then acquired by CBS Corporation (later Paramount Global) in February 2017 for $9.5 million after submitting the only bid for the bankrupt company. Paramount then folded Scout into 247Sports, with Scout.com redirecting to that site.
