= Real Real Real =

1990 single by Jesus Jones

Single by Jesus Jones

from the album Doubt
- Released: 26 March 1990
- Length: 3:06
- Label: Food; EMI
- Songwriter: Jesus Jones
- Producer: Mike Edwards

Jesus Jones singles chronology
"Bring It On Down" (1990)	"Real Real Real" (1990)	"Right Here, Right Now" (1990)

"Real Real Real" is a song by UK band Jesus Jones from their second album, Doubt (1991). It was released in March 1990 as the first single from Doubt, just prior to the release of the album. "Real Real Real" peaked at No. 19 on the UK Singles Chart and became the band's second top-10 US hit, peaking at No. 4 on the Billboard Hot 100 in 1991.

== Charts ==
=== Weekly charts ===
Chart (1990–1991)	Peak position
Australia (ARIA)	117
Canada Top Singles (RPM)	10
Netherlands (Single Top 100)	59
New Zealand (Recorded Music NZ)	37
UK Singles (Official Charts)	19
US Billboard Hot 100	4
US 12-inch Singles Sales (Billboard)	27
US Hot Dance Club Play (Billboard)	5
US Modern Rock Tracks (Billboard)	26
US Cash Box Top 100	7

=== Year-end charts ===
Chart (1991)	Position
Canada Top Singles (RPM)	88
US Billboard Hot 100	85
