= Right Here, Right Now (Jesus Jones song) =

1990 single by Jesus Jones

- Artwork variant for standard UK single releases

Single by Jesus Jones

from the album Doubt
- B-side: "Move Me"/"Damn Good at This" (original) "Welcome Back Victoria" (reissue)
- Released: 24 September 1990
- Studio: Matrix (London, UK); Ezee (London, UK)
- Genre: Dance-rock; alternative rock; alternative dance
- Length: 3:09
- Label: Food; EMI; SBK
- Songwriter: Mike Edwards
- Producer: Martyn Phillips

Jesus Jones singles chronology
"Real Real Real" (1990)	"Right Here, Right Now" (1990)	"International Bright Young Thing" (1991)

Music video
- "Right Here, Right Now" on YouTube

"Right Here, Right Now" is a song by British alternative rock band Jesus Jones from their second studio album, Doubt (1991). It was released as the album's second single on 24 September 1990, by Food, EMI and SBK Records. Although it spent only nine nonconsecutive weeks on the UK Singles Chart, peaking at number 31, it became a top-10 hit in the United States; it topped the Billboard Modern Rock Tracks chart and reached number two on the Billboard Hot 100 in July 1991. The single sold over one million copies, won a BMI Award, and was the most-played song on college radio in 1991.

== Content ==
The song was inspired by the Revolutions of 1989 in Europe, particularly Perestroika in the Soviet Union. Mike Edwards has said that some of the lyrics were influenced by the band's experiences playing in Romania in February 1990 shortly after the overthrow of Nicolae Ceaușescu. The lyrics were also inspired by the 1987 Prince song "Sign o' the Times" and a 1989 cover version of it by Simple Minds, which the members of Jesus Jones had first heard during television coverage of the fall of the Berlin Wall. Edwards' original demo for "Right Here, Right Now" featured samples of the Prince song, as well as guitar solos by Jimi Hendrix, but producer Martyn Phillips removed both elements from the song before the band recorded it.

The official video for the song shows the band performing on stage mixed with images from contemporary political events such as the fall of the Berlin Wall, news footage of the collapse of the Soviet Union and speeches by American and Soviet leaders.

== Reception ==
The song was number 14 on a list of the 50 greatest conservative rock songs by the National Review in June 2006. The list's author John J. Miller explained, "The words are vague, but they’re also about the fall of Communism and the end of the Cold War."

== Credits ==
- Produced by Martyn Phillips
- Recorded at Matrix Studios and Ezee Studios in London
- Engineer Darren Allison

== Charts ==
=== Weekly charts ===
Chart (1990–1991)	Peak position
Australia (ARIA)	35
Canada Top Singles (RPM)	18
Europe (Eurochart Hot 100)	87
Germany (GfK)	84
Netherlands (Single Top 100)	61
New Zealand (Recorded Music NZ)	29
Switzerland (Schweizer Hitparade)	14
UK Singles (Official Charts)	31
UK Airplay (Music Week)	13
US Billboard Hot 100	2
US Album Rock Tracks (Billboard)	7
US Dance Club Play (Billboard)	29
US Modern Rock Tracks (Billboard)	1
US Cash Box Top 100	1

=== Year-end charts ===
Chart (1991)	Position
US Billboard Hot 100	17
US Album Rock Tracks (Billboard)	25
US Modern Rock Tracks (Billboard)	5
US Cash Box Top 100	27

== Release history ==
Region	Date	Format(s)	Label(s)	Ref.
United Kingdom	24 September 1990	7-inch vinyl; 10-inch vinyl; 12-inch vinyl; CD; cassette	Food; EMI	
Australia	21 January 1991	7-inch vinyl; cassette	Food; EMI	
Japan	30 January 1991	Mini-CD	Food; EMI	
United Kingdom (re-release)	8 July 1991	7-inch vinyl; 12-inch vinyl; CD; cassette	Food; EMI	
Australia	22 July 1991	CD	Food; EMI	

== Covers ==
A cover version was recorded by New Zealand band the Feelers and released as a single in 2010 and on the album Hope Nature Forgives. It was chosen as the anthem to the 2011 Rugby World Cup advertising campaign.

== See also ==
- Number one modern rock hits of 1991
