= Live at the Marquee (Jesus Jones album) =

Live album by Jesus Jones
- Released: 4 October 2005
- Recorded: 8 November 2002
- Venue: The Marquee, London
- Genre: Alternative rock, alternative dance, indie rock
- Length: 86:07 (without interview); 139:06 (with interview)
- Label: Secret Records

Jesus Jones chronology
Culture Vulture (2004)	Live at the Marquee (2005)	The Remixes (2007)

Live at the Marquee is a live album by Jesus Jones released in 2005 but recorded in 2002 live at London's The Marquee. The album was released as a download only, although a video recording of the performance was released on DVD in 2004.

PopMatters rated the album five out of ten.

== Track listing ==
1. "Zeroes and Ones" - 3:51
2. "Move Mountains" - 3:03
3. "International Bright Young Thing" - 2:52
4. "Caricature" - 3:54
5. "The Next Big Thing" - 3:49
6. "The Devil You Know" - 4:29
7. "In the Face of All This" - 3:23
8. "Bring It On Down" - 3:56
9. "All the Answers" - 3:36
10. "Chemical #1" - 3:05
11. "Come On Home" - 3:07
12. "Right Here Right Now" - 3:26
13. "Are You Satisfied" - 3:52
14. "Welcome Back Victoria" - 3:36
15. "Message" - 2:15
16. "Never Enough" - 2:43
17. "Rocket Ships" - 3:39
18. "Half Up the Hill" - 3:29
19. "Real Real Real" - 3:06
20. "Nowhere Slow" - 3:42
21. "Info Freako" - 2:40
22. "Who Where Why" - 3:50
23. "Trust Me" - 2:01
24. "Cut & Dried" - 3:35
25. "Idiot Stare" - 5:08
26. Jesus Jones - Interview - 52:59 (Bonus track)
