= Andy Ross (music executive) =

British music executive (1956–2022)

Andrew Ian Ross (31 January 1956 – 25 January 2022) was a British music executive, influential in the history of Britpop in the mid-1990s.

== Early life and education ==
Ross was born on 31 January 1956. He came from south London and attended Dulwich College. He studied economic and social history from 1975 to 1978 at the University of Leicester, gaining a BA degree. At university he formed the band Disco Zombies.

== Career ==
Ross started working in record shops. He worked for the Inland Revenue for two years to get a mortgage. Through a friend he became a part-time music journalist. He left the Inland Revenue around 1986 to head Food Records in central Camden, whilst still a part-time journalist for Sounds magazine. Food Records had been formed in the mid-1980s by David Balfe.

Ross saw Blur at the Islington Powerhaus in November 1989; of live music in pubs he said that "it's essential for any artist to play in front of a live audience for interaction". Blur also played at the Bull and Gate in Kentish Town. He signed Blur on 7 March 1990; the band were given a small advance and a celebration was held at a pizza house on Beak Street.

Ross said that the Reading Festival in August 1993 (where they headlined the Melody Maker stage on Saturday) was the turning point of Blur's career. EMI bought out Food Records in early 1994. He often went to the Good Mixer pub in north London, an Irish bar on Inverness Street, which had been developed by Bal Croce of the Sting-rays; Morrissey was one of the regulars, with Pulp and Menswear.

With Damon Albarn, Ross decided to bring forward the release of Blur's 1995 single "Country House". The album 13 was the last Blur album associated with Food Records. He also signed the Supernaturals from Glasgow and worked with the Bluetones.

== Personal life and death ==
Ross died from complications following treatment for cancer on 25 January 2022, at the age of 65, just six days before his 66th birthday.

== See also ==
- John Robb
- Saul Galpern of Nude Records, who signed Suede
- Live Forever: The Rise and Fall of Brit Pop, 2003 film
- Mike Smith also signed Blur for publishing
