= Scout Media =

American media company

Scout Media, formerly The North American Outdoor Group and the North American Membership Group (NAMG), was an American media company, specializing in membership clubs and related magazines. Since 2007 it has been owned by the Pilot Group, a private equity firm run by Robert W. Pittman. In 2013, NAMG acquired Scout.com. NAMG combined with Scout.com to form Scout Media. Pilot Group lost control of Scout Media to a group of Russian investors. Scout Media filed for bankruptcy in 2016; it was acquired by CBS Sports Digital in 2017.

== Former NAMG Clubs and Magazines ==
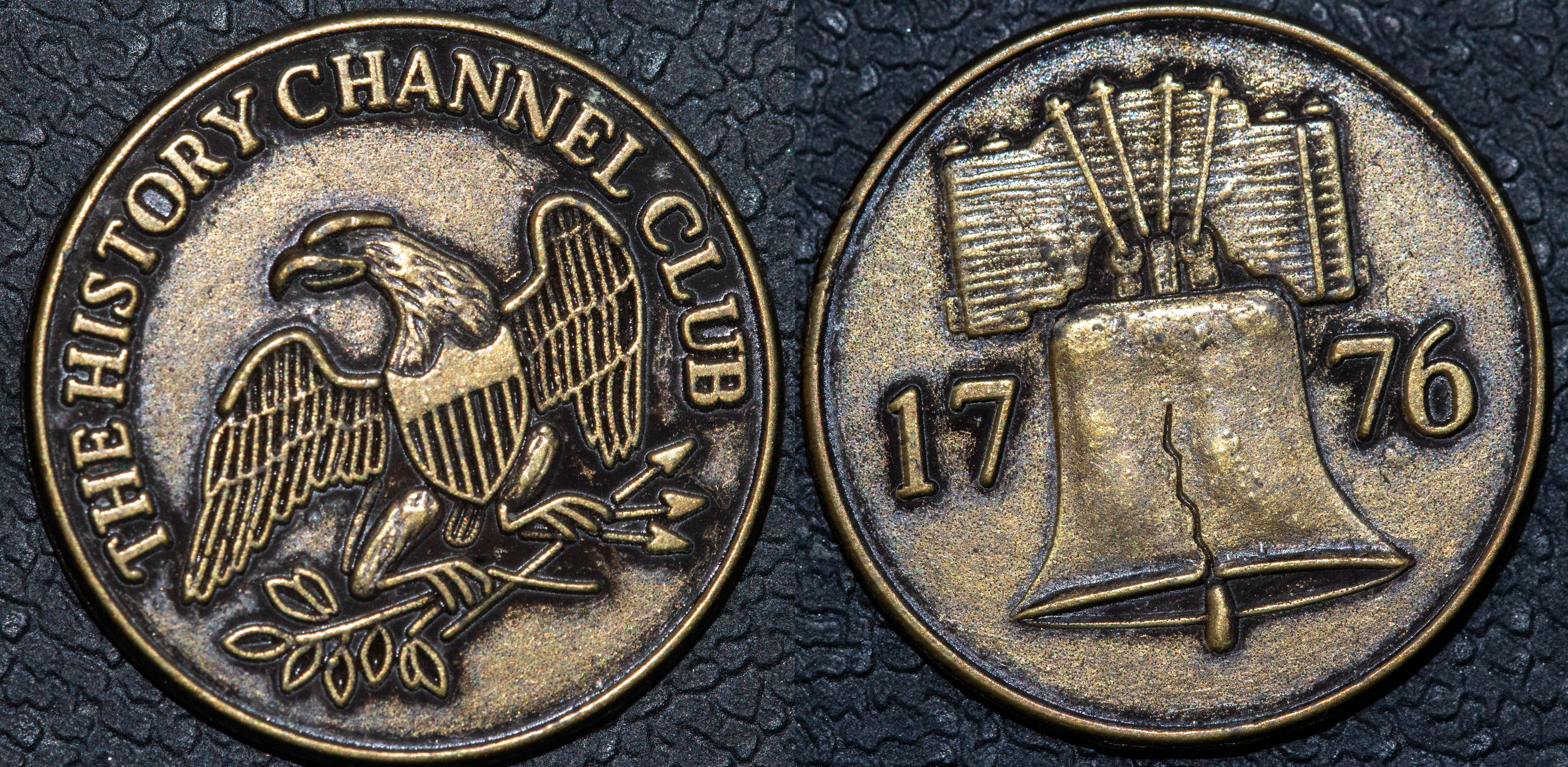
The History Channel Club Coin, 1976

- North American Hunting Club (North American Hunter) – Founded in 1978
- North American Fishing Club (North American Fisherman) – Founded in 1988
- Handyman Club of America (HANDY) – Founded in 1993
- National Home Gardening Club (Gardening How-To)
- Golf Partners Club (formerly PGA TOUR Partners Club)
- Cooking Club of America (Cooking Club)
- National Health & Wellness Club
- Creative Home Arts Club (Today’s Creative Home Arts)
- The History Channel Club (The History Channel Magazine)
- National Street Machine Club (Street Thunder)
- Motorcycle Riders Club of America (Rider)
- Major League Baseball Insiders Club (MLB Insiders)
- Scout.com
- Tailgater Magazine
