= Culture Vulture (EP) =

EP by Jesus Jones
- Released: 19 April 2004
- Genre: Alternative dance, alternative rock
- Length: 14:46 (not including the remix tracks); 20:04 (remix tracks); 34:50 (total)
- Label: MI5
- Producer: Jesus Jones

Jesus Jones chronology
London (2001)	Culture Vulture (2004)	Passages (2018)

Professional ratings
Review scores
Source	Rating
AllMusic	(?)-dead link

Culture Vulture ! is a 2004 EP by the British rock band Jesus Jones. Though considered by some to be an album due only to its length, it is an EP, since only the first four tracks are meant to be heard as fully produced songs. The remaining seven tracks are the "stems" of the title track, meaning that each one is the composite of all the singular recordings that are combined to make up every individual instrumental or vocal performance used in the song; these were added in order to give listeners the opportunity to remix the song themselves, and were not intended for casual listening. Fans were also encouraged to submit their remixes to the band, who then selected 24 of them which were hosted on the official Jesus Jones site for a period of time.

== Track listing ==
1. "Culture Vulture" - 3:22
2. "Find the Dial" - 3:31
3. "Head in the Sand" - 3:49
4. "Halfway House" - 4:04

=== Bonus audio files to remix "Culture Vulture" ===
5. "Guitar" - 3:23
6. "Drums" - 3:30
7. "Lead Vocals" - 3:23
8. "Bass" - 3:23
9. "Backing Vocals" - 3:23
10. "Synths and Samples" - 2:57
11. "Count" - 0:05
