= Al Doughty =

Alan Doughty
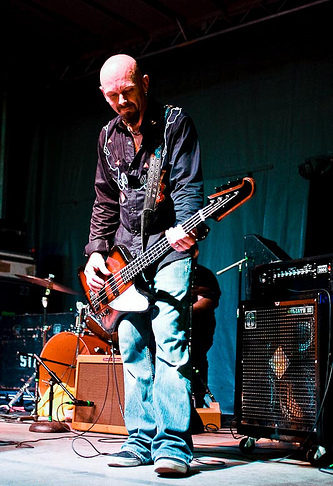

Background information
- Born: Alan Doughty; 31 January 1966 (age 60); Plymouth, Devon, England
- Genres: Alt-Country; Rock and Roll; Punk rock
- Occupation: Musician
- Instrument: Bass
- Years active: 1988–present
- Label: Bloodshot

Al Doughty is an English musician and bassist. He is primarily known for being a member since 1988 of the alternative rock band Jesus Jones, in which he continues to be active.

== Career ==
Originally the bassist for the London based rock band Jesus Jones, Doughty later became the bassist for Jon Langford's band Skull Orchard, the Waco Brothers, and Dean Schlabowske's band Dollar Store. Of his unorthodox bass style, Doughty said, "It's all nervous energy. I really have no idea where I'm going next with something. I don't know anything about theory. It's all new to me every time I play".
