= Diesel Park West =

English alternative rock band

- Origin: Leicester, England
- Genres: Alternative rock
- Years active: 1980–present
- Label: Danville UK
- Members: John Butler; Rich Barton; Darryl Hopper; Dave Bryant
- Past members: Mick Salisbury; David "Moth" Smith; David Anderson; Geoff Beavan; Rick Willson; Ian Michie; Rob Morris
- Website: www.dieselparkwest.com

Diesel Park West are an English alternative rock band from Leicester, England. Formed in 1980, they have released thirteen official albums, plus six singles that have appeared in the UK singles chart.

== History ==
=== The early years, 1980–1987 ===
The group was originally formed in 1980 as The Filberts (after local football team, Leicester City's former Filbert Street ground), although they would also occasionally appear as The Psychedelic Filberts. Their main influences come from the West Coast sound of 1960s bands such as Moby Grape, Buffalo Springfield and Love. The main creative force in the band is Butler, who writes nearly all the band's material. Butler and Moth (who had also drummed for Leicester bands Legay and then Gypsy) had previously played together in a short-lived band called The Flicks, releasing one album in 1979 called Go for the Effect. Three Psychedelic Filberts tracks were released – a cover of The Byrds' "Lady Friend" on the Obscure Independent Classics Volume 2 album; a cover of the Beatles' "Rain" which was included on Yeah Yeah Noh's final release, the Temple of Convenience EP; and "Atlantis 1968", which appeared on the He Didn't Even Draw A Fish on My Shower Curtain compilation album.

Beavan was at the same school with Butler and shared the same passion for West Coast music and then joining up with Butler and Smith in The Filberts.

Rick Willson was a young guitar player and had his own studio in Barkby Road where the group started a long period of writing and recording. During this time they amassed a large number of songs, honing their skills and trying to get record label attention.

In 1984, the band released a one-off single as The Come On called "Guitar Party", and provided the backing band to Del Shannon on his 1983 tour but it was several years before they got a recording contract. In 1987, Butler received a call from David Balfe from the small independent record label, Food Records, leading to the group's signing to Food.

August 1987 saw the release of band's debut single, "When the Hoodoo Comes". It began to get airplay on late night radio shows and word of mouth about the group started to spread, and the Food label was acquired by EMI. Mick Salisbury joined the band at around this time as third guitarist.

=== Major record label years, 1988–1992 ===
With a big label now behind the group, they went into Olympic Studios in January 1988 to start work on their debut album. With Chris Kimsey producing, the sessions were completed in May 1988. Soon after Salisbury was replaced by Rich Barton.

Their second single, "Jackie's Still Sad" was released in October 1988, metaphorically incorporating the life of Jackie Onassis, and although it failed to chart, it gained a number of positive reviews, including 'single of the week' in Record Mirror. The album, Shakespeare Alabama, was released on 30 January 1989, and was well received in the music press, but the album only reached No. 55 in the UK Albums Chart. To coincide with the album release, the band supported Big Country on tour, and then followed that up with a headlining tour of their own. "Like Princes Do" was released as the third single from the album. After the release of a reworked "When the Hoodoo Comes" in August 1989, the group fell quiet and it would be over a year after The Hoodoo EP before their next release – an album of b-sides, covers and outtakes, entitled Flipped.

During this time Smith departed the band, and they eventually went to record their second album without a full-time drummer (although Manu Katche drummed on several songs on the album). In September 1990, they went to Belgium to work with Laurie Latham, using a drum machine on many tracks. Recording was finished in early 1991, however release of the album was delayed several times by EMI. A new single, "Walk With the Mountain", was scheduled to be released in September 1991 and a video was recorded in America, however EMI cancelled the release. The eventual lead single, "Fall to Love", was released early the following year, reaching No. 48 in the UK singles chart in January 1992. Their album, Decency, was released on 3 February 1992, and peaked at No. 57 in the UK Albums Chart. On the supporting tour, Dave Anderson joined the group full-time on drums. "Boy on Top of the News", a song inspired by Brian Jones was released as the second single from the album and reached No. 58 on the singles chart.

In September 1992, a cover of The Beach Boys, "God Only Knows" was released as a single in various formats, each with a number of other cover versions including Moby Grape's "Bitter Wind", the Beatles' "While My Guitar Gently Weeps", and the Rolling Stones' "Tumbling Dice".

In 2016, Strata Books published a memoir on its website written by John Butler about Shakespeare Alabama in which he discusses the band's struggles to secure their record deal, the creative challenges they faced in the recording studio and the aftermath of the album's release.

=== Independent years, 1993–1997 ===
The group left EMI and Demon Records came in straight away for the band. In early 1993, the Diesels recorded their third album, Diesel Park West vs. the Corporate Waltz. In contrast to Decency the album was recorded quickly and two singles, "Six Days to JuJu" and "The Cat's Still Scratching" were released. The band moved on from Demon Records.

The band never stopped writing and recording in their Barkby Road studio. During 1994 they recorded more than four albums worth of material, some of which would not be released for many years.

Another independent record label, Permanent Records signed them in and, in 1995, they released FreakGene, their fourth album. Belinda Carlisle later recorded a cover of "I See No Ships" from the album. Geoff Beavan had left the band prior to recording this album and was replaced by Ian Michie.

After the album's release the Diesels toured the country and then went home to Leicester to continue writing and recording.

=== Solo, original line up reformation and later years, 1997–present ===
EMI released a best of in 1997 called Left Hand Band (Butler, Willson and Michie all being left-handed).

The last album FreakGene had caught the attention of several major labels and subsequently Butler signed to Chrysalis Records for a solo deal. His album, The Loyal Serpent, was released on 3 November 1997, and gained a four star review in Q Magazine. Although it was a solo album, his bandmates all played a part of the recording.

In 1998, a new Diesel Park West album was released, HIPReplacement, comprising songs recorded around the time of "FreakGene". They also released a bonus CD, made up of the Shakespeare Alabama demos. The album was released by small Oxford based label Thunderbird Records. Rich Barton and Dave Anderson had left the group by this point, although both play on the album. Anderson went into music tuition and session work.

The original line-up of the group reformed and toured in 1999, playing Shakespeare Alabama in full (a decade ahead of other bands doing similar 'album' tours) and old Moby Grape favourites. During the year they recorded and played one-off gigs in Leicester and London, showcasing some of their new material. However old resentments resurfaced and Smith left the band again. During this period, they accepted an invitation to contribute to More Oar: A Tribute to the Skip Spence Album, a tribute album for Moby Grape co-founder Skip Spence, who was terminally ill with cancer. In 2000, the band signed to Hypertension Records and their next album, Thought For Food was released in August.

In early 2001, Butler unveiled his second solo album, Worthless Bastard Rock. To complete their deal with Thunderbird Records, a compilation of the demos from Shakespeare Alabama and Decency called King of Ghosts was released in 2002. Shakespeare Alabama was reissued in August 2006. A DVD of the Diesels in concert over the years was released in April 2007, called Damned Anthems.

The Diesel's next album, Blood And Grace, was released in June 2007, preceded by the single "There's A Grace" on their own Danville Records label. The follow-up single "Personal Lives" came out in August. Rob 'Vom' Morris (ex Crazyhead) joined on drums. "There's a Grace" received radio airplay and Janice Long invited them onto her BBC Radio 2 show for a session.

The Diesel's teamed up with Chris Kimsey again to record for a new album called Do Come In, Excuse The Mess released in August 2012 which has gained some radio play.

Butler released Ringstead, as a download only on the Diesel Park West website in March 2012. Recorded, mainly in 2005 with producer Lee Russell in a converted Northamptonshire church.

Another album by Diesel Park West was released in March 2012. What Kept You is a collection of unreleased tracks from 1994 to 1996, recorded during the period that brought about FreakGene. The album proves what a fertile period this was for Butler and the band. It is available as a download on the Diesel Park West website.

A further series of archive material was released on the official website. Some of this previously unreleased material dated back to 1987 and included their entire BBC radio sessions. Also released was a covers album of Byrds songs (Diesels play Byrds), showing again where the Diesel's passions lay.

The Diesels released a new EP called You, You, You & You in May 2013, a collection of six new songs available initially as a download on their official website. Lead single, "Someday Back Together" has had radio play on Radio Caroline.

Rich Barton rejoined Diesel Park West in 2014 and he has played with the band in more recent gigs and festivals.

John Butler released his third solo album, Universal Stranger in July 2017 on Strataville, preceded by the single, "A Little Misunderstanding" in April. These recordings will be released as Jon C. Butler to avoid any confusion with the other musical John Butler. In April 2017, a pre-order for Universal Stranger including a limited edition retrospective album A Backward Glance was announced on Pledge Music.

Geoff Beavan took a break from the band for health reasons and Ian Michie rejoined on bass.

The Diesels album Let It Melt was released on 13 September 2019, their ninth official release and the first one to fully feature guitarist Rich Barton since the Corporate Waltz. Three singles have been released prior to the album. "Living in the U.K.", "Suki" and "Pictures in the Hall".

The new album has already been reviewed positively even in some UK press but most significantly has received an extremely warm reception this time in the American music media.

The tenth Diesel Park West album, Not Quite The American Dream was released on 29 July 2022. The album was recorded during the COVID lockdowns of 2020. It was preceded by a couple of singles, "One Shot of Happiness" and "Secondary Modern Man"; both of which have charted on the British Heritage Chart.

Rob Morris and Ian Michie have both left the band. A new group has been put together featuring John Butler, Rich Barton, Darryl Hopper (bass) and Dave Bryant (drums).

The first album with the new line up was released in March 2024, titled Presley Trap on the bands own 'Danville' label. The single "Wonder (Just a Word)" has charted on the Heritage Chart.

A new single "Hole in One" was released in February 2025. This became a Number One hit on the Heritage Chart in mid-March. The single was taken from their forthcoming new album entitled, Leicester?. This was released on 17 April 2025 on the band's website.

Their thirteenth album, Jangles Up, was released on 14 April 2026. It was preceded by the single “Perfect Weather” which has reached the top twenty of the Heritage Chart.

== Discography ==
=== Albums ===
- Shakespeare Alabama (January 1989) UK No. 55
- Flipped (Compilation, August 1990)
- Decency (February 1992) UK No. 57
- Diesel Park West vs. The Corporate Waltz (June 1993)
- FreakGene (May 1995)
- Left Hand Band (Best of, February 1997)
- HIPReplacement (September 1998)
- Thought for Food (August 2000)
- King of Ghosts (March 2002) – collection of demos for Shakespeare Alabama and Decency
- Blood and Grace (June 2007)
- Do Come in Excuse The Mess (August 2012)
- You, You, You & You (EP) (May 2013)
- Let It Melt (September 2019)
- Not Quite The American Dream (July 2022)
- Presley Trap (March 2024)
- Leicester? (April 2025)
- Jangles Up (April 2026)

=== Singles ===
- "When The Hoodoo Comes" (1987)
- "Jackie's Still Sad" (1988)
- "All the Myths on Sunday" (1989) UK No. 66
- "Like Princes Do" (1989) UK No. 58
- "When The Hoodoo Comes" (The Hoodoo EP) (1989) UK No. 62
- "Fall to Love" (1992) UK No. 48
- "Boy on Top of the News" (1992) UK No. 58
- "God Only Knows" (1992) UK No. 57
- "Six Days to JuJu" (1993)
- "The Cat's Still Scratching" (1993)
- "The Natural Things" (withdrawn, 1995)
- "Love It" (1998)
- "There's A Grace" (2007)
- "Personal Lives" (2007)
- "Charlotte, It's All Over" (2012)
- "Someday Back Together" (2013)
- "Living in the U.K." (2019)
- "Suki" (2019)
- "Pictures in the Hall" (2019)
- "One Shot of Happiness" (2022)
- "Secondary Modern Man" (2022)
- "Let's Pretend" (2024)
- "Garden" (2024)
- "Bump in the Night" (2024)
- "Wonder (Just a Word)" (2024)
- "Sleep On It" (2024)
- "Hole in One" (2025)
- "Perfect Weather" (2026)

=== Downloads (official website) ===
- The Filberts: In The Studio (1980-1982)
- The Filberts: With The Filberts (1982-1984)
- BBC Radio 1 Sessions (1987–2007)
- What Kept You (songs from 1993 to 1995)
- Hang Johnson (songs from 1997 to 1999)
- Snooker, Curry & Dope (songs from 2000)
- Butler Willson (songs from 2002)
- Diesels Play Byrds (2008)
- Ringstead (unreleased John Butler solo 2012)

=== Compilation contributions ===
- More Oar: A Tribute to the Skip Spence Album (Birdman Records, 1999)

=== DVD ===
- Damned Anthems (2007)

== John Butler solo ==
=== Albums ===
- The Loyal Serpent (September 1997)
- Worthless Bastard Rock (February 2001)

=== Singles ===
- "Wings of the Morning" (withdrawn, 1997)

== As 'Jon C. Butler' ==
=== Album ===
- Universal Stranger (28 July 2017)

=== Single ===
- "Ghost in My Heart" (June 2017)
- "A Little Misunderstanding" (April 2017)
