= Food Records =

Former British record label (1984–2000)

- Parent company: EMI (1994–2000)
- Founded: 1984; 41 years ago
- Founder: David Balfe, Andy Ross
- Defunct: 2000
- Distributor(s): Rough Trade
- Genre: Alternative rock; rock; indie rock; pop rock
- Country of origin: United Kingdom

Food Records was a British rock record label set up in 1984 by David Balfe (formerly of Zoo Records), who later took on Andy Ross as his partner. Originally formed as an independent record label with distribution going through Rough Trade Distribution, Food also licensed acts through WEA Records, before becoming closely associated with the EMI group's Parlophone label. EMI invested in the label and then in 1994 EMI gained complete control and folded it into Parlophone in 2000. Ross died in 2022 aged 65.

== Artists ==
Food was sold to EMI by David Balfe in 1994. Andy Ross continued running Food as a sub-label of EMI, where it was the record label of Blur, Strangelove, Idlewild, Jesus Jones, Dubstar, The Supernaturals, Octopus and Grass Show and Fungus from Sweden.

== The Food Christmas EP ==
The Food Christmas EP

EP by Various
- Released: December 1989
- Recorded: 1989
- Genre: Indie-rock
- Length: 11:27
- Label: Food
- Producer: Mike Edwards, Rick Wilson, John Butler

In December 1989, Food Records released The Food Christmas EP (FOOD 23) that featured Food artists covering each other's songs. Crazyhead covered Diesel Park West's "Like Princes Do", Jesus Jones covered Crazyhead's "I Don't Want That Kind Of Love" and Diesel Park West covered Jesus Jones' "Info-Freako". The EP was released on CD, 7" vinyl, 12" and a limited gatefold sleeve 12" vinyl.

The EP charted at #63 on the UK Singles Chart.

Track listing (7" and 12")

1. "I Don't Want That Kind Of Love" (Reverb) – 4:10 performed by Jesus Jones
2. "Like Princes Do" (John Butler) – 3:25 performed by Crazyhead
3. "Info Freako" (Mike Edwards) – 3:52 performed by Diesel Park West
  - CD versions reverse the track order to begin with "Info Freako".

Credits

- Mike Edwards - producer ("I Don't Want That Kind Of Love")
- Rick Wilson - producer ("Like Princes Do" and "Info Freako")
- John Butler - producer ("Info Freako")

== See also ==
- List of record labels
