= List of songs recorded by Blur =

Songs recorded by Blur

This is a comprehensive list of songs by English band Blur. Since forming in 1989, the band have released nine studio albums, six live albums, five compilation albums, and thirty-five singles. This list does not contain live versions or remixes released by the band.

Blur have officially released 255 songs, excluding alternate versions or remixes.

== Original songs ==
Title	Album/Single	Year	Words by	Song by	Lead vocals
"1"	Blur 21 (recorded in 2000)	2012	Albarn	Albarn/Coxon/James/Rowntree	Albarn
"3"	Blur 21 (recorded in 2000)	2012	Albarn	Albarn/Coxon/James/Rowntree	Albarn
"7 Days"	"Music Is My Radar"	2000	Albarn	Albarn/Coxon/James/Rowntree	Albarn
"1992"	13	1999	Albarn	Albarn/Coxon/James/Rowntree	Albarn
"A Song"	"Charmless Man"	1996	Albarn	Albarn/Coxon/James/Rowntree	Albarn
"A Spell (For Money)"	"Beetlebum"	1997	Instrumental	Albarn/Coxon/James/Rowntree	Instrumental
"Advert"	Modern Life is Rubbish	1993	Albarn	Albarn/Coxon/James/Rowntree	Albarn
"Alex's Song"	"End of a Century"	1994	James	Albarn/Coxon/James/Rowntree	James
"All We Want"	"Tender"	1999	Albarn	Albarn/Coxon/James/Rowntree	Albarn
"All Your Life"	"Beetlebum"	1997	Albarn	Albarn/Coxon/James/Rowntree	Albarn
"Always" (early demo of "I'm Fine")	Blur 21	2012	Albarn	Albarn/Coxon/James/Rowntree	Albarn
"Ambulance"	Think Tank	2003	Albarn	Albarn/Coxon/James/Rowntree	Albarn
"Anniversary Waltz"	"Girls & Boys"	1994	Instrumental	Albarn/Coxon/James/Rowntree	Instrumental
"Avoid the Traffic"	Blur 21	2012	Albarn	Albarn/Coxon/James/Rowntree	Rowntree
"B.L.U.R.E.M.I."	13	1999	Albarn	Albarn/Coxon/James/Rowntree	Albarn
"Bad Day"	Leisure	1991	Albarn	Albarn/Coxon/James/Rowntree	Albarn
"Badgeman Brown"	"Popscene"	1992	Albarn	Albarn/Coxon/James/Rowntree	Albarn
"Badhead"	Parklife	1994	Albarn	Albarn/Coxon/James/Rowntree	Albarn
"Bang"	Leisure	1991	Albarn	Albarn/Coxon/James/Rowntree	Albarn
"Bank Holiday"	Parklife	1994	Albarn	Albarn/Coxon/James/Rowntree	Albarn
"Battery In Your Leg"	Think Tank	2003	Albarn	Albarn/Coxon/James/Rowntree	Albarn
"Battle"	13	1999	Albarn	Albarn/Coxon/James/Rowntree	Albarn
"Beachcoma"	"For Tomorrow"	1993	Albarn	Albarn/Coxon/James/Rowntree	Albarn
"Beached Whale"	Blur 21 (previously featured on untitled 1992 demo tape)	2012	Albarn	Albarn/Coxon/James/Rowntree	Albarn
"Beagle 2"	"No Distance Left to Run"	1999	Instrumental	Albarn/Coxon/James/Rowntree	Albarn
"Beard"	"Parklife"	1994	Instrumental	Albarn/Coxon/James/Rowntree	Instrumental
"Beetlebum"	Blur	1997	Albarn	Albarn/Coxon/James/Rowntree	Albarn
"Berserk"	"Bang"	1991	Instrumental	Albarn/Coxon/James/Rowntree	Albarn
"Best Days"	The Great Escape	1995	Albarn	Albarn	Albarn
"Birthday"	Leisure	1991	Albarn	Albarn/Coxon/James/Rowntree	Albarn
"Black Book"	"Music Is My Radar"	2000	Albarn	Albarn/Coxon/James/Rowntree	Albarn
"Blue Jeans"	Modern Life is Rubbish	1993	Albarn	Albarn/Coxon/James/Rowntree	Albarn
"Blurred"	"Blurred"	1996	Albarn	Pianoman	Albarn
"Bored Housewives"	Blur 21 (recorded 1995)	2012	Albarn	Albarn/Coxon/James/Rowntree	Albarn
"Bone Bag"	"For Tomorrow"	1993	Albarn	Albarn/Coxon/James/Rowntree	Albarn
"Brothers and Sisters"	Think Tank	2003	Albarn	Albarn/Coxon/James/Rowntree	Albarn
"Bugman"	13	1999	Albarn	Albarn/Coxon/James/Rowntree	Albarn
"Bustin' + Dronin'"	"Song 2"	1997	Albarn	Albarn/Coxon/James/Rowntree	Albarn
"Caramel"	13	1999	Albarn	Albarn/Coxon/James/Rowntree	Albarn
"Caravan"	Think Tank	2003	Albarn	Albarn/Coxon/James/Rowntree	Albarn
"Charmless Man"	The Great Escape	1995	Albarn	Albarn	Albarn
"Chemical World"	Modern Life is Rubbish	1993	Albarn	Albarn/Coxon/James/Rowntree	Albarn
"Chinese Bombs"	Blur	1997	Albarn	Albarn/Coxon/James/Rowntree	Albarn
"Close"	"Close" (Fan club single)	1998	Albarn	Albarn/Coxon/James/Rowntree	Albarn
"Clover Over Dover"	Parklife	1997	Albarn	Albarn/Coxon/James/Rowntree	Albarn
"Coffee & TV"	13	1999	Coxon	Albarn/Coxon/James/Rowntree	Coxon
"Colin Zeal"	Modern Life is Rubbish	1993	Albarn	Albarn/Coxon/James/Rowntree	Albarn
"Colours"	"Colours" (Fan club single)	2003	Albarn	Albarn/Coxon/James/Rowntree	Albarn
"Come Together"	Leisure	1991	Albarn	Albarn/Coxon/James/Rowntree	Albarn
"Commercial Break"	Modern Life is Rubbish (as a hidden track)	1993	Instrumental	Albarn/Coxon/James/Rowntree	Instrumental
"Coping"	Modern Life is Rubbish	1993	Albarn	Albarn/Coxon/James/Rowntree	Albarn
"Country House"	The Great Escape	1995	Albarn	Albarn	Albarn
"Country Sad Ballad Man"	Blur	1997	Albarn	Albarn/Coxon/James/Rowntree	Albarn
"Cowboy Song"	Dead Man on Campus soundtrack	1998	Albarn	Albarn/Coxon/James/Rowntree	Albarn
"Coyote"	"Coffee & TV"	1999	Albarn	Albarn/Coxon/James/Rowntree	Albarn
"Crazy Beat"	Think Tank	2003	Albarn	Albarn/James/Rowntree	Albarn
"Cross Channel Love"	Blur 21 (recorded 1994 or 1995)	2012	Albarn	Albarn/Coxon/James/Rowntree	Albarn
"Dan Abnormal"	The Great Escape	1995	Albarn	Albarn	Albarn
"Dancehall"	"Beetlebum"	1997	Albarn	Albarn/Coxon/James/Rowntree	Albarn
"Day Upon Day"	"There's No Other Way"	1991	Albarn	Albarn/Coxon/James/Rowntree	Albarn
"Death of a Party"	Blur	1997	Albarn	Albarn/Coxon/James/Rowntree	Albarn
"Death Metal"	Unreleased	1999	Albarn	Albarn/Coxon/James/Rowntree	Albarn
"Dizzy"	"Sunday Sunday"	1993	Albarn	Albarn/Coxon/James/Rowntree	Albarn
"Don't Be"	"Crazy Beat"	2003	Albarn	Albarn/James/Rowntree	Albarn
"Don't Bomb When You Are the Bomb"	"Don't Bomb When You Are the Bomb"	2002	Albarn	Albarn/James/Rowntree	Albarn
"Down"	"She's So High"	1990	Albarn	Albarn/Coxon/James/Rowntree	Albarn
"Eine Kleine Lift Musik"	The Help Album	1995	Albarn	Albarn/Coxon/James/Rowntree	Albarn
"End of a Century"	Parklife	1994	Albarn	Albarn/Coxon/James/Rowntree	Albarn
"Entertain Me"	The Great Escape	1995	Albarn	Albarn	Albarn
"Ernold Same"	The Great Escape	1995	Albarn	Albarn	Ken Livingstone/Albarn
"Es Schmect"	"Chemical World"	1993	Albarn	Albarn/Coxon/James/Rowntree	Albarn
"Essex Dogs"	Blur	1997	Albarn	Albarn/Coxon/James/Rowntree	Albarn
"Sir Elton John's Cock" (recorded in 2002)	Blur 21	2012	Albarn	Albarn/Coxon/James/Rowntree	Albarn
"Explain"	"Bang"	1991	Albarn	Albarn/Coxon/James/Rowntree	Albarn
"Fade Away"	The Great Escape	1995	Albarn	Albarn	Albarn
"Far Out"	Parklife	1994	James	Albarn/Coxon/James/Rowntree	James
"Fed Up"	Unreleased	1989	Albarn	Albarn/Coxon/James/Rowntree	Albarn
"Fool"	Leisure	1991	Albarn	Albarn/Coxon/James/Rowntree	Albarn
"Fool's Day"	"Fool's Day"	2010	Albarn	Albarn/Coxon/James/Rowntree	Albarn
"For Old Time's Sake"	Unreleased (was to be released on "Sunday Sunday")	1993	Albarn	Albarn/Coxon/James/Rowntree	Albarn
"For Tomorrow"	Modern Life is Rubbish	1993	Albarn	Albarn/Coxon/James/Rowntree	Albarn
"French Song"	"Tender"	1999	Albarn	Albarn/Coxon/James/Rowntree	Albarn
"Fried"	"Sunday Sunday"	1993	Albarn	Albarn/Coxon/James/Rowntree	Albarn
"Garden Central"	"Popscene"	1992	Instrumental	Albarn/Coxon/James/Rowntree	Instrumental
"Gene by Gene"	Think Tank	2003	Albarn	Albarn/James/Rowntree	Albarn
"Get Out of Cities"	"Song 2"	1997	Albarn	Albarn/Coxon/James/Rowntree	Albarn
"Ghost Ship"	The Magic Whip	2015	Albarn	Albarn/Coxon/James/Rowntree	Albarn
"Girls & Boys"	Parklife	1994	Albarn	Albarn/Coxon/James/Rowntree	Albarn
"Globe Alone"	The Great Escape	1995	Albarn	Albarn	Albarn
"Go Out"	The Magic Whip	2015	Albarn	Albarn/Coxon/James/Rowntree	Albarn
"Good Song"	Think Tank	2003	Albarn	Albarn/James/Rowntree	Albarn
"Got Yer!"	"To the End"	1994	Albarn	Albarn/Coxon/James/Rowntree	Albarn
"Hanging Over"	"For Tomorrow"	1993	Albarn	Albarn/Coxon/James/Rowntree	Albarn
"He Thought of Cars"	The Great Escape	1995	Albarn	Albarn	Albarn
"Headist/Into Another"	"Music Is My Radar"	2000	Albarn	Albarn/Coxon/James/Rowntree	Albarn
"Here I Am"	Unreleased	1989	Albarn	Albarn/Coxon/James/Rowntree	Albarn
"High Cool"	Leisure	1991	Albarn	Albarn/Coxon/James/Rowntree	Albarn
"Hope You Find Your Suburb"	Blur 21	2012	Albarn	Albarn/Coxon/James/Rowntree	Albarn
"I Broadcast"	The Magic Whip	2015	Albarn	Albarn/Coxon/James/Rowntree	Albarn
"I Got Law"	"13" (Japan bonus track)	1999	Albarn	Albarn/Coxon/James/Rowntree	Albarn
"I Know"	"She's So High"	1990	Albarn	Albarn/Coxon/James/Rowntree	Albarn
"I Love Her"	"I Love Her" (Fan club single)	1997	Albarn	Albarn/Coxon/James/Rowntree	Albarn
"Ice Cream Man"	The Magic Whip	2015	Albarn	Albarn/Coxon/James/Rowntree	Albarn
"I'm All Over"	"There's No Other Way"	1991	Albarn	Albarn/Coxon/James/Rowntree	Albarn
"I'm Fine"	"Popscene"	1992	Albarn	Albarn/Coxon/James/Rowntree	Albarn
"I'm Just a Killer For Your Love"	Blur	1997	Albarn	Albarn/Coxon/James/Rowntree	Albarn
"Inertia"	"There's No Other Way"	1991	Albarn	Albarn/Coxon/James/Rowntree	Albarn
"Interlude"	Blur (as a hidden track)	1997	Instrumental	Albarn/Coxon/James/Rowntree	Instrumental
"Intermission"	Modern Life is Rubbish (as a hidden track)	1993	Instrumental	Albarn/Coxon/James/Rowntree	Instrumental
"Into Another"	"For Tomorrow"	1993	Albarn	Albarn/Coxon/James/Rowntree	Albarn
"It Could Be You"	The Great Escape	1995	Albarn	Albarn	Albarn
"Intro"	No Distance Left to Run (film)	2010	Sound bite	Albarn/Coxon/James/Rowntree	Sound bite
"Jawbone" (recorded in 2000)	Blur 21	2012	Albarn	Albarn/Coxon/James/Rowntree	Albarn
"Jets"	Think Tank	2003	Albarn	Albarn/James/Rowntree/Mike Smith	Albarn
"Jubilee"	Parklife	1994	Albarn	Albarn/Coxon/James/Rowntree	Albarn
"London Loves"	Parklife	1994	Albarn	Albarn/Coxon/James/Rowntree	Albarn
"Lonesome Street"	The Magic Whip	2015	Albarn/Coxon	Albarn/Coxon/James/Rowntree	Albarn/Coxon
"Look Inside America"	Blur	1997	Albarn	Albarn/Coxon/James/Rowntree	Albarn
"Long Legged"	"Sunday Sunday"	1993	Albarn	Albarn/Coxon/James/Rowntree	Albarn
"Lot 105"	Parklife	1994	Albarn	Albarn/Coxon/James/Rowntree	Albarn
"Ludwig"	"Stereotypes"	1996	Instrumental	Albarn/Coxon/James/Rowntree	Albarn
"Luminous"	"Bang"	1991	Albarn	Albarn/Coxon/James/Rowntree	Albarn
"Kazoo" (demo from 1992)	Blur 21	2012	Albarn	Albarn/Coxon/James/Rowntree	Albarn
"Kissin Time"	Kissin Time (Marianne Faithfull album)	2002	Marianne Faithfull/Albarn	Albarn/Coxon/James/Rowntree	Marianne Faithfull/Albarn
"M.O.R."	Blur	1997	Albarn	Albarn/Coxon/James/Rowntree/Brian Eno/David Bowie	Albarn
"Mace"	"Popscene"	1992	Albarn	Albarn/Coxon/James/Rowntree	Albarn
"Magpie"	"Girls & Boys"	1994	Albarn	Albarn/Coxon/James/Rowntree	Albarn
"Magic America"	Parklife	1994	Albarn	Albarn/Coxon/James/Rowntree	Albarn
"Me, White Noise"	Think Tank (as a hidden track)	2003	Albarn	James/Albarn/Rowntree	Albarn/Phil Daniels
"Me, White Noise" (Alternate version)	"Good Song"	2003	Albarn	Albarn/James/Rowntree	Albarn
"Mellow Jam	"Tender"	1999	Albarn	Albarn/James/Rowntree	Albarn
"Mellow Song"	13	1999	Albarn	Albarn/Coxon/James/Rowntree	Albarn
"Metal Hip Slop"	"Coffee & TV"	1999	Albarn	Albarn/Coxon/James/Rowntree	Albarn
"Mirrorball"	The Magic Whip	2015	Albarn	Albarn/Coxon/James/Rowntree	Albarn
"Miss America"	Modern Life is Rubbish	1993	Albarn	Albarn/Coxon/James/Rowntree	Albarn
"Mixed Up"	"Sunday Sunday"	1993	Albarn	Albarn/Coxon/James/Rowntree	Albarn
"Money Makes Me Crazy"	"Out of Time"	2003	Albarn	Albarn/Coxon/James/Rowntree	Albarn
"Moroccan Peoples Revolutionary Bowls Club"	Think Tank	2003	Albarn	James/Albarn/Rowntree	Albarn
"Morricone"	"Good Song"	2003	Albarn	Albarn/James/Rowntree	Albarn
"Movin' On"	Blur	1997	Albarn	Albarn/Coxon/James/Rowntree	Albarn
"Mr. Briggs"	"There's No Other Way"	1991	Albarn	Albarn/Coxon/James/Rowntree	Albarn
"Mr. Robinson's Quango"	The Great Escape	1995	Albarn	Albarn	Albarn
"Music Is My Radar"	"Music Is My Radar"	2000	Albarn	Albarn/Coxon/James/Rowntree	Albarn
"My Ark"	"Chemical World"	1993	Albarn	Albarn/Coxon/James/Rowntree	Albarn
"My Terracotta Heart"	The Magic Whip	2015	Albarn	Albarn/Coxon/James/Rowntree	Albarn
"Never Clever"	"Chemical World"/Food 100	1993; 1997	Albarn	James/Albarn/Rowntree/Coxon	Albarn
"New World Towers"	The Magic Whip	2015	Albarn	Albarn/Coxon/James/Rowntree	Albarn
"No Distance Left to Run"	13	1999	Albarn	Albarn/Coxon/James/Rowntree	Albarn
"No Monsters in Me"	"The Universal"	1995	Albarn	Albarn/Coxon/James/Rowntree	Albarn
"Nutter"	Blur 21	2012	Albarn	Albarn/Coxon/James/Rowntree	Albarn
"Oily Water"	Modern Life Is Rubbish	1993	Albarn	Albarn/Coxon/James/Rowntree	Albarn
"On the Way to the Club"	Think Tank	2003	Albarn	Albarn/James/Rowntree/James Dring	Albarn
"On Your Own"	Blur	1997	Albarn	Albarn/Coxon/James/Rowntree	Albarn
"One Born Every Minute"	"Country House"	1995	Albarn	Albarn/Coxon/James/Rowntree	Albarn
"Ong Ong"	The Magic Whip	2015	Albarn	Albarn/Coxon/James/Rowntree	Albarn
"Optigan 1"	13	1999	Instrumental	Albarn/Coxon/James/Rowntree	Instrumental
"Out of Time"	Think Tank	2003	Albarn	Albarn/James/Rowntree	Albarn
"The Outsider"	"Crazy Beat"	2003	Albarn	Albarn/Coxon/James/Rowntree	Albarn
"Pap Pop"	Blur 21 (originally featured on untitled 1992 demo tape)	2012	Albarn	Albarn/Coxon/James/Rowntree	Albarn
"Parklife"	Parklife	1994	Albarn	Albarn/Coxon/James/Rowntree	Albarn/Phil Daniels
"Peach"	"For Tomorrow"	1993	Albarn	Albarn/Coxon/James/Rowntree	Albarn
"People In Europe"	"Girls & Boys"	1994	Albarn	Albarn/Coxon/James/Rowntree	Albarn
"Peter Panic"	"Girls & Boys"	1994	Albarn	Albarn/Coxon/James/Rowntree	Albarn
"Piano"	Blur 21	2012	Albarn	Albarn/Coxon/James/Rowntree	Albarn
"Pleasant Education"	Unreleased (aired on Blur-radio.com)	1992	Albarn	Albarn/Coxon/James/Rowntree	Albarn
"Polished Stone"	"Song 2"	1997	Albarn	Albarn/Coxon/James/Rowntree	Albarn
"Popscene"	"Popscene"	1992	Albarn	Albarn/Coxon/James/Rowntree	Albarn
"Pressure on Julian"	Modern Life Is Rubbish	1993	Albarn	Albarn/Coxon/James/Rowntree	Albarn
"Pyongyang"	The Magic Whip	2015	Albarn	Albarn/Coxon/James/Rowntree	Albarn
"Red Necks"	"End of a Century"	1994	Coxon	Albarn/Coxon/James/Rowntree	Coxon
"Repetition"	Leisure	1991	Albarn	Albarn/Coxon/James/Rowntree	Albarn
"Resigned"	Modern Life Is Rubbish	1993	Albarn	Albarn/Coxon/James/Rowntree	Albarn
"Rico"	Blur 21	2012	Albarn	Albarn/Coxon/James/Rowntree	Albarn
"Saturday"	Unreleased	2002	Albarn	Albarn/Coxon/James/Rowntree	Albarn
"Saturday Morning"	Blur 21 Originally Played at Blur.X (exhibition) in 1999	2012	Albarn	Albarn/Coxon/James/Rowntree	Albarn
"She Don't Mind" (demo from 1992)	Blur 21	2012	Albarn	Albarn/Coxon/James/Rowntree	Albarn
"She's So High"	Leisure	1991	Albarn	Albarn/Coxon/James/Rowntree	Albarn
"Shimmer"	"Sunday Sunday"	1993	Albarn	Albarn/Coxon/James/Rowntree	Albarn
"Sing"	Leisure	1991	Albarn	Albarn/Coxon/James/Rowntree	Albarn
"Sing (to Me)"	"Sing (to Me)" (Fan club single)	1998	Albarn	Albarn/Coxon/James/Rowntree	Albarn
"Singular Charm"	unreleased	1992	Albarn	Albarn/Coxon/James/Rowntree	Albarn
"Slow Down"	Leisure	1991	Albarn	Albarn/Coxon/James/Rowntree	Albarn
"So You"	"No Distance Left to Run"	1999	Albarn	Albarn/Coxon/James/Rowntree	Albarn
"Some Glad Morning"	"Some Glad Morning" (Fan club single)	2005	Albarn	Albarn/Coxon/James/Rowntree	Albarn
"Song 2"	Blur	1997	Albarn	Albarn/Coxon/James/Rowntree	Albarn
"Squeezebox"	Blur 21	2012	Albarn	Albarn/Coxon/James/Rowntree	Albarn
"St. Louis"	"Charmless Man"	1996	Albarn	Albarn/Coxon/James/Rowntree	Albarn
"Starshaped"	Modern Life Is Rubbish	1993	Albarn	Albarn/Coxon/James/Rowntree	Albarn
"Stereotypes"	The Great Escape	1995	Albarn	Albarn	Albarn
"Strange News from Another Star"	Blur	1997	Albarn	Albarn/Coxon/James/Rowntree	Albarn
"Sub Species of an American Day"	Unreleased	2005	Albarn	Albarn/Coxon/James/Rowntree	Albarn
"Sunday Sunday"	Modern Life Is Rubbish	1993	Albarn	Albarn/Coxon/James/Rowntree	Albarn
"Supa Shoppa"	"Parklife"	1994	Instrumental	Albarn/Coxon/James/Rowntree	Instrumental
"Sunnyside Farm"	Sunnyside Farm TV series theme	1997	Albarn/Phil Daniels	Albarn	Albarn/Phil Daniels
"Swallows in the Heatwave"	"M.O.R."	1997	Albarn	Albarn/Coxon/James/Rowntree	Albarn
"Swamp Song"	13	1999	Albarn	Albarn/Coxon/James/Rowntree	Albarn
"Sweet Song"	Think Tank	2003	Albarn	Albarn/James/Rowntree	Albarn
"Tame"	"Stereotypes"	1996	Albarn	Albarn/Coxon/James/Rowntree	Albarn
"Tell Me, Tell Me"	"Sunday Sunday"	1993	Albarn	Albarn/Coxon/James/Rowntree	Albarn
"Tender"	13	1999	Albarn/Coxon	Albarn/Coxon/James/Rowntree	Albarn/Coxon
"The Debt Collector"	Parklife	1994	Instrumental	Albarn/Coxon/James/Rowntree	Instrumental
"The Horrors"	"Charmless Man"	1996	Instrumental	Albarn/Coxon/James/Rowntree	Instrumental
"The Man Who Left Himself"	"Stereotypes"	1996	Albarn	Albarn/Coxon/James/Rowntree	Albarn
"The Puritan"	"Under the Westway"	2012	Albarn	Albarn/Coxon/James/Rowntree	Albarn
"The Universal"	The Great Escape	1995	Albarn	Albarn	Albarn
"The Wassailing Song"	"The Wassailing Song"	1992	Albarn	Albarn/Coxon/James/Rowntree	James/Albarn/Rowntree/Coxon
"Theme from an Imaginary Film"	"Parklife"	1994	Albarn	Albarn/Coxon/James/Rowntree	Albarn
"Theme from Retro"	Blur	1997	Instrumental	Albarn/Coxon/James/Rowntree	Instrumental
"There Are Too Many of Us"	The Magic Whip	2015	Albarn	Albarn/Coxon/James/Rowntree	Albarn
"There's No Other Way"	Leisure	1991	Albarn	Albarn/Coxon/James/Rowntree	Albarn
"This Is a Low"	Parklife	1994	Albarn	Albarn/Coxon/James/Rowntree	Albarn
"Thought I Was a Spaceman"	The Magic Whip	2015	Albarn/Coxon	Albarn/Coxon/James/Rowntree	Albarn/Coxon
"Threadneedle Street"	"To the End"	1994	Albarn	Albarn/Coxon/James/Rowntree	Albarn
"To the End"	Parklife	1994	Albarn	Albarn/Coxon/James/Rowntree	Albarn/Lætitia Sadier
"To the End (French version)"	"Parklife"	1994	Albarn	Albarn/Coxon/James/Rowntree	Albarn
"To the End (La Comedie)"	"Country House"	1995	Albarn	Albarn/Coxon/James/Rowntree	Albarn/Françoise Hardy
"Top Man"	The Great Escape	1995	Albarn	Albarn	Albarn
"Tracy Jacks"	Parklife	1994	Albarn	Albarn/Coxon/James/Rowntree	Albarn
"Trade Stylee"	"Coffee & TV"	1999	Albarn	Albarn/Coxon/James/Rowntree	Albarn
"Trailerpark"	13	1999	Albarn	Albarn/Coxon/James/Rowntree	Albarn
"Trimm Trabb"	13	1999	Albarn	Albarn/Coxon/James/Rowntree	Albarn
"Trouble In the Message Centre"	Parklife	1994	Albarn	Albarn/Coxon/James/Rowntree	Albarn
"Tune 2"	"Out of Time"	2003	Instrumental	Albarn/Coxon/James/Rowntree	Albarn
"Turn It Up"	Modern Life Is Rubbish	1993	Albarn	Albarn/Coxon/James/Rowntree	Albarn
"Ultranol"	"The Universal"	1995	Albarn	Albarn/Coxon/James/Rowntree	Albarn
"Uncle Love"	"Bang"	1991	Albarn	Albarn/Coxon/James/Rowntree	Albarn
Untitled (a.k.a. "Ernold Same (Reprise)")	The Great Escape (as a hidden track)	1995	Instrumental	Albarn	Instrumental
"Under the Westway"	"Under the Westway" (premiered live, 2012. Early mix featured on Blur 21)	2012	Albarn	Albarn/Coxon/James/Rowntree	Albarn
"Us"	Blur (demo tape)	2011	Albarn	Albarn/Coxon/James/Rowntree	Albarn
"Villa Rosie"	Modern Life Is Rubbish	1993	Albarn	Albarn/Coxon/James/Rowntree	Albarn
"Wear Me Down"	Leisure	1991	Albarn	Albarn/Coxon/James/Rowntree	Albarn
"We've Got a File on You"	Think Tank	2003	Albarn	Albarn/Coxon/James/Rowntree	Albarn
"When the Cows Come Home"	"For Tomorrow"	1993	Albarn	Albarn/Coxon/James/Rowntree	Albarn
"Woodpigeon Song"	"Beetlebum"	1997	Albarn	Albarn/Coxon/James/Rowntree	Albarn
"Won't Do It"	"There's No Other Way"	1991	Albarn	Albarn/Coxon/James/Rowntree	Albarn
"X-Offender"	"Coffee & TV"	1999	Albarn	Albarn/Coxon/James/Rowntree	Albarn
"Y'all Doomed"	The Magic Whip (bonus track)	2015	Albarn	Albarn/Coxon/James/Rowntree	Albarn/Coxon
"You're So Great"	Blur	1997	Coxon	Coxon	Coxon
"Young and Lovely"	"Chemical World"	1993	Albarn	Albarn/Coxon/James/Rowntree	Albarn
"Yuko and Hiro"	The Great Escape	1995	Albarn	Albarn	Albarn

== Covers ==
Title	Album/Single Release	Year	Original artist	Writer
"Daisy Bell"	The Sunday Sunday Popular Community Song CD	1993	N/A	Harry Dacre
"Let's All Go Down the Strand"	The Sunday Sunday Popular Community Song CD	1993	N/A	Harry Castling/Clarence Wainwright Murphy
"Postman Pat Theme"	Starshaped	1993	Ken Barrie	Bryan Daly
"Maggie May"	Ruby Trax/"Chemical World"	1993	Rod Stewart	Martin Quittenton/Rod Stewart
"For old Time's Sake"	The Sunday Sunday Popular Community Song CD (unreleased)	1993	Traditional	N/A
"Oliver's Army"	Peace Together	1993	Elvis Costello	Elvis Costello
"Substitute"	Who Covers Who?	1993	The Who	Pete Townshend
"When Will We Be Married"	Starshaped	1993	The Waterboys	Traditional/Mike Scott/Anthony Thistlethwaite

== Alternate/remix ==
This list does not include live versions.

Title	Album/Single Release	Year
"Bad Day" (Excerpt)	Focusing in with Blur	1991
"Bad Day" (Leisurely Mix)	"High Cool/Bad Day"	1991
"Bang" (Edited)	"Bang" (promo)	1991
"Bang" (Excerpt)	Focusing in with Blur	1991
"Bang" (Extended)	"Bang"	1991
"Bang" (MW 40 Feet Under Mix)	"Bang" (Mindwarp Mutations)	1992
"Bang" (MW Big Bang 12" Mix)	"Bang" (Mindwarp Mutations)	1992
"Bang" (MW Hardcore Assault)	"Bang" (Mindwarp Mutations)	1992
"Bang" (MW Groove Remix)	"Bang" (Mindwarp Mutations)	1992
"Bang" (Now Mix)	Blur-ti-go	1992
"Bang" (Trend Mix)	Blur-ti-go	1992
"Bang" (Unedited)	"Bang" promo	1991
"Bank Holiday" Sung by Japanese fans	The Special Collectors Edition	1994
"Battle" (UNKLE Remix)	"No Distance Left to Run"	1999
"Beetlebum" (Instrumental Remix)	"Song 2" Japan version	1997
"Beetlebum" (Mario Caldato Jr's. Mix)	"Beetlebum"	1997
"Beetlebum" (Moby's Minimal House Mix)	"M.O.R."	1997
"Beetlebum" (Moby's Mix)	Bustin' + Dronin'	1998
"Beetlebum" (Radio Edit)	"Beetlebum" US promo	1997
"Black Book" (Radio Edit)	Q Awards - The Album	2000
"Chemical World" (Demo) (a.k.a. US version)	Modern Life is Rubbish (US version)	1993
"Chemical World" (Reworked)	"Chemical World"	1993
"Chemical World" (Edit)	"Chemical World"	1993
"Coffee & TV" (Radio edit)	"Coffee & TV"	1999
"Coffee & TV" (Single edit)	"Coffee & TV"	1999
"Come Together" (Demo)	"Won't Do It/Come Together"	2002
"Death of a Party" (7" Remix)	"Death of a Party"	1997
"Death of a Party" (12" Death)	"Death of a Party"	1997
"Death of a Party" (Demo)	"Death of a Party"	1996
"Death of a Party" (Billy Whiskers Remix)	Bustin' + Dronin'	1998
"Death of a Party" (Well Blurred Remix)	Bustin' + Dronin'	1998
"Don't Be" (Acoustic Mix)	Exclusive 5 Track CD	2003
"End of a Century" (Acoustic)	"End of a Century"	1994
"Entertain Me" (The Live It! Remix)	"The Universal"	1995
"Essex Dogs" (Thurston Moore's Mix)	Bustin' + Dronin'	1998
"Far Out" Beagle 2 Remix	No Distance Left to Run	1999
"For Tomorrow" (Acoustic)	"For Tomorrow"	1993
"For Tomorrow" (Visit to Primrose Hill Extended)	"For Tomorrow"	1993
"Girls & Boys" Edit	"Girls & Boys"	1994
"Girls & Boys" (Summer Mix)	"Girls & Boys" Remixed by Fargetta	1994
"Girls & Boys" (Undgeround Mix)	"Girls & Boys" Remixed by Fargetta	1994
"Girls & Boys" (Pet Shop Boys 7" Mix)	"Girls & Boys"	1994
"Girls & Boys" (Pet Shop Boys 12" Mix)	"Girls & Boys"	1994
"High Cool" (Easy Listening Mix)	"High Cool/Bad Day"	1991
"High Cool" (Excerpt)	Focusing in with Blur	1991
"I Know" (Excerpt)	Focusing in with Blur	1991
"I Know" (Extended)	"She's So High/I Know"	1991
"Lonesome Street" (Instrumental)	"Lonesome Street"	2015
"Lonesome Street" (Radio Edit)	"Lonesome Street"	2015
"Me, White Noise" (Damon vocal version edit)	Think Tank Promo	2003
"M.O.R." (Road Version)	"M.O.R."	1997
"M.O.R." (Karaoke)	"M.O.R." Japan	1997
"M.O.R." (US Road Version)	"M.O.R."	1997
"Money Makes Me Crazy" (Marrakech Mix)	"Out Of Time"	2003
"Money Makes Me Crazy" (Deepest Darkest Devon Mix)	Benicassim 2003	2003
"Movin' On" (William Orbit Mix)	Bustin' + Dronin'	1998

== Other recordings ==
- There are also seven hidden tracks on the 13 album. These are all untitled and are found after "Bugman", "Coffee & TV", "B.L.U.R.E.M.I.", "Battle", "Trailerpark", with the remaining two at the end of "Caramel".
- On Starshaped, "Commercial Break" is given a new name, "Outro".
- Also on Starshaped are some songs only on that release. "Explain" is one of these, given a different name ("Can't Explain"), and "When Will We Be Married" is another).
- No Distance Left to Run features "Intro", the track that opens the Hyde Park concert featured on the second DVD.
- Some US promo CDs include 'callout research hooks', ten second clips intended for radio stations.

Interview tracks feature on the interview albums Focusing in with Blur, Basically Blur, Blurb, 15on13 and Interview CD.
