= Live at Wembley Stadium (album) =

Live album by Blur
- Released: 26 July 2024
- Recorded: 8 and 9 July 2023
- Venue: Wembley Stadium
- Genre: Britpop
- Length: 121:42 (2–CD)
- Label: Parlophone
- Producers: Matt Butcher; Stuart Lowbridge

Blur chronology
The Ballad of Darren (2023)	Live at Wembley Stadium (2024)

Live at Wembley Stadium is the fourth live album by the English rock band Blur, released on 26 July 2024 by Parlophone and produced by Matt Butcher and Stuart Lowbridge. It was recorded at Wembley Stadium, London on 8 and 9 July 2023, just a few weeks before the release of their ninth studio album The Ballad of Darren. The performances mark the largest concerts of the band's career to date.

The release of the live album was accompanied by two related films that year: the documentary To the End and the concert film Blur: Live at Wembley Stadium. Most versions of the record contain the full 9 July performance, whereas the double vinyl edition consists of "highlights" from both shows. It was met with critical acclaim and charted in several territories, peaking on the UK Albums Chart at number six.

== Background ==
In November 2022, Blur announced that they would embark on a reunion tour, including a single headlining show in the U.K. at London's Wembley Stadium on Saturday, 8 July 2023, supported by Jockstrap, Sleaford Mods, and Self Esteem. (Note: Originally, the rapper Slowthai was announced as one of the support acts for the 8 July show, but the lineup was later changed to include Sleaford Mods instead.) At that point, Blur had not headlined since 2015, when they were supporting their album The Magic Whip from that year. A few days after the announcement, citing popular demand, they added a second Wembley Stadium gig for the day immediately following the first show. The Sunday show was supported by the Selecter and Paul Weller. Performing to an combined audience of roughly 150,000 people, the shows were the largest of the band's career.

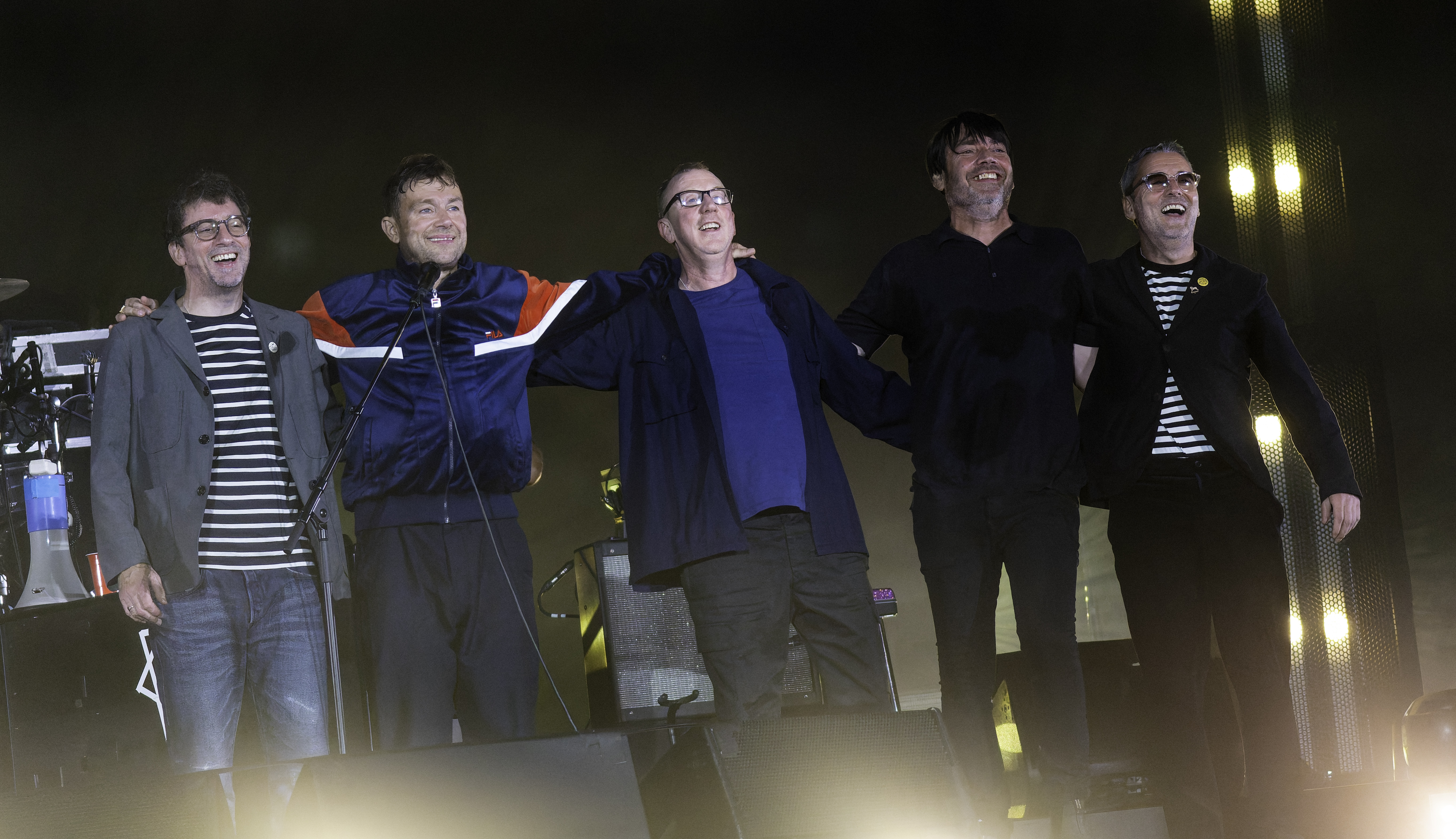
Blur with Mike Smith (right) at Wembley Stadium, 9 July 2023.

In an interview with KROQ, vocalist Damon Albarn said that while the first night went "great", he was quite hesitant to follow through with the second show, admitting he "was trying to find reasons to cancel it" until he found himself sitting in his hotel room and watching people arrive. Ultimately, however, Albarn was pleased with their second performance, to the point where he told Apple Music 1 that it was the band's "best ever" show. Bassist Alex James added that at Wembley, they could afford to be louder than at other venues, and by the second night, they likely felt more comfortable with their sound on the stage. Just weeks after the Wembley concerts, Blur released their ninth studio album The Ballad of Darren.

== Promotion and release ==
Live at Wembley Stadium was announced in June 2024 and was released the following 26 July via Parlophone. In the UK, although it had reached the top position on the Official Charts Company's midweek update chart based on sales and streaming data, it peaked at number six on the main albums chart. Elsewhere, it charted at number two in Scotland and fell within the top forty in Austria, Germany, Switzerland, and in Belgium's Flanders and Wallonia regions.

A pair of accompanying films surrounded the release of the album that year. The first, To the End, arrived in theatres exactly one week before the album. It is a documentary following the events of their reunion and the making of their studio album The Ballad of Darren (2023). The second, Blur: Live at Wembley Stadium, is a concert film of the band's Wembley Stadium performances. It arrived in theatres on 6 September. Both films were directed by Toby L.

The album was released in two main versions. One version consists of the full Sunday performance, which includes the double CD, triple vinyl, (Note: "Lot 105" is not included on the triple vinyl version.) and double cassette formats. However, the triple vinyl excludes "Lot 105", the Japanese double CD includes the bonus track "Luminous", and streaming versions include four bonus tracks recorded at other venues. The other main distinguishing version of the album was issued on double vinyl and consists of "highlights" from both performances. This edition was additionally available as a double picture disc, limited to four thousand hand-numbered copies. Overall, Live at Wembley Stadium is Blur's first live album to receive a vinyl release.

== Critical reception ==
Professional ratings
Aggregate scores
Source	Rating
Metacritic	84/100
Review scores
Source	Rating
Buzz	4/5 stars
Clash	8/10
Classic Pop	4/5 stars
Hot Press	8/10
The Independent	8/10
Mojo	4/5 stars
Pitchfork	7.0/10
Record Collector	4/5 stars
Uncut	9/10

According to the review aggregator Metacritic, Live at Wembley Stadium received "universal acclaim" based on a weighted average score of 84 out of 100 from four critic scores. Writing for the Welsh magazine Buzz, Teresa Delfino said that the set shows the group "at their strongest contemporarily", and the live backdrop only benefits the experience. Rating it four stars out of five, Victoria Segal of Mojo described the record as a mix of celebration and nostalgia, culminating in a "remarkably moving distillation" of the band's three-decades-long career. Matthew George of The Independent described the record as commemoration of Blur's "crowning moment" at Wembley and said it was a "brave" choice to start the album with the new song "St. Charles Square".

In an eight out of ten review, Clash magazine's Emma Harrison called Live at Wembley Stadium a "masterclass" showcase of Blur's catalogue and cultural significance, adding that the music felt authentic throughout, citing Albarn's mistakes when reciting the lyrics as an example. In Pitchfork, reviewer Stephen Thomas Erlewine found the record favourable to many contemporary live albums, saying it "actually feels alive" in comparison and highlighting Albarn's periodic lyrical mistakes and emotionally-overwhelmed delivery. Erlewine also said that, even though the band sound noticeably older, their age lent a certain poignancy to the material, saying that Albarn's more-matured voice added "a sense of empathy to his cultural observations". Overall, Erlewine rated it 7.0 out of 10 and thought the album is best listened to in formats containing the full Sunday performance. Kyle Lemmon of Flood Magazine, reviewing the double-vinyl edition, thought that specific release is better suited for existing fans of the group.

== Track listing ==
=== Most versions ===
All tracks are written by Damon Albarn, Graham Coxon, Alex James, and Dave Rowntree.

Live at Wembley Stadium track listing
No.	Title	Original album	Length
1.	"St. Charles Square"	The Ballad of Darren	4:17
2.	"There's No Other Way"	Leisure	4:21
3.	"Popscene"	Non-album single	3:33
4.	"Tracy Jacks"	Parklife	4:33
5.	"Beetlebum"	Blur	5:58
6.	"Trimm Trabb"	13	5:31
7.	"Villa Rosie"	Modern Life Is Rubbish	6:10
8.	"Stereotypes"	The Great Escape	4:22
9.	"Out of Time"	Think Tank	4:07
10.	"Coffee & TV"	13	6:07
11.	"Under the Westway"	Non-album single	4:55
12.	"End of a Century"	Parklife	3:25
13.	"Sunday Sunday"	Modern Life Is Rubbish	3:53
14.	"Country House"	The Great Escape	4:55
15.	"Parklife" (featuring Phil Daniels)	Parklife	3:50
16.	"To the End"	Parklife	4:21
17.	"Oily Water"	Modern Life Is Rubbish	4:23
18.	"Advert"	Modern Life Is Rubbish	3:27
19.	"Song 2"	Blur	3:22
20.	"This Is a Low"	Parklife	7:20
21.	"Lot 105"	Parklife	2:40
22.	"Girls & Boys"	Parklife	5:39
23.	"For Tomorrow"	Modern Life Is Rubbish	5:06
24.	"Tender" (featuring the London Community Gospel Choir)	13	6:46
25.	"The Narcissist"	The Ballad of Darren	4:23
26.	"The Universal"	The Great Escape	4:18
Total length:			121:42

Japanese CD 2 bonus track
No.	Title	Original album	Length
27.	"Luminous"	"Bang" single B-side	3:02
Total length:			124:44

Streaming bonus tracks
No.	Title	Original album	Length
27.	"Trouble in the Message Centre" (live at Colchester Arts Centre)	Parklife	3:43
28.	"Young & Lovely" (live at Eastbourne Winter Garden)	"Chemical World" single B-side	4:27
29.	"Intermission" (live at Wolverhampton Civic Hall)	Modern Life Is Rubbish	2:00
30.	"Bank Holiday" (live at Newcastle City Hall)	Parklife	2:00
Total length:			133:52

=== Double vinyl "highlights" version ===
Each track was recorded on 9 July 2023, except where noted.

Side 1
No.	Title	Original album	Length
1.	"St. Charles Square"	The Ballad of Darren
2.	"There's No Other Way" ( (Note: Recorded on 8 July 2023.))	Leisure
3.	"Popscene"	Non-album single
4.	"Beetlebum"	Blur

Side 2
No.	Title	Original album	Length
1.	"Trimm Trabb"	13
2.	"Villa Rosie"	Modern Life Is Rubbish
3.	"Coffee & TV"	13
4.	"Under the Westway"	Non-album single

Side 3
No.	Title	Original album	Length
1.	"Out of Time"	Think Tank
2.	"To the End"	Parklife
3.	"Parklife"	Parklife
4.	"Song 2"	Blur
5.	"This Is a Low"	Parklife

Side 4
No.	Title	Original album	Length
1.	"Girls & Boys"	Parklife
2.	"Tender"	13
3.	"The Narcissist"	The Ballad of Darren
4.	"The Universal"	The Great Escape

== Personnel ==
Credits are adapted from the double cassette liner notes.

=== Blur ===
- Damon Albarn – vocals, guitar, piano, Hammond organ
- Graham Coxon – guitars, backing vocals; lead vocals on "Coffee & TV"
- Alex James – bass
- Dave Rowntree – drums

=== London Community Gospel Choir ===
Featured vocals on "Tender":

- Adrian Blake
- Annette Bowen
- Anya Chieka
- Geneta Crooke
- Aileen Dela Cruz
- Sarah Farrell
- Kiing Gardener
- Yvonne Garshong
- Charlene Grant
- Elizabeth Jal
- Simon King
- Claudia Kingsley
- Ennis Langdon
- Jenny Latouche
- Evy Lee
- Vernetta Lynch
- Neresa Maye
- Marcia McEachron
- Leonn Meade
- Ce'Anna Meade-Fearon
- Connie Morton-Young
- Emmanuel Onafowokan
- Jon Rattenbury
- Patrick Reis
- Mahlon Rhamie
- Rebecca Roberts
- Davinia Rodriques-Daniel
- Cherrill Rowe
- Keshia Smith
- Matt Ward

=== Additional contributors ===
- Mike Smith – keyboards, saxophone, backing vocals, musical direction
- Travis Cole – additional vocals
- Wayne Hernandez – additional vocals
- Janet Ramus – additional vocals
- Wendi Rose – additional vocals
- Phil Daniels – featured vocals on "Parklife"
- Matt Butcher – production, recording, mixing, FOH sound engineering
- Stuart Lowbridge – production, live music supervision
- Andy Baldwin – mastering at Metropolis Studios London
- Craig Burns – audio systems tech
- James Kerridge – audio systems tech
- Dan Scantlebury/Entec – audio
- R-W Studio – design
- Reuben Bastienne-Lewis – photography
- Phoebe Fox – photography
- Tom Pallant – photography

== Charts ==
Chart performance for Live at Wembley Stadium
Chart (2024)	Peak position
Austrian Albums (Ö3 Austria)	21
Belgian Albums (Ultratop Flanders)	32
Belgian Albums (Ultratop Wallonia)	16
French Albums (SNEP)	69
German Albums (Offizielle Top 100)	26
Italian Albums (FIMI)	70
Portuguese Albums (AFP)	44
Scottish Albums (OCC)	2
Spanish Albums (Promusicae)	66
Swiss Albums (Schweizer Hitparade)	34
UK Albums (OCC)	6
