= Blur 21 =

Box set by Blur
- Released: 30 July 2012
- Recorded: 1989–2012
- Genres: Britpop, alternative rock, indie rock, experimental rock
- Label: Food/Virgin/Parlophone
- Producers: Stephen Street, William Orbit, Steve Lovell, Steve Power, others

Blur chronology
All the People: Blur Live at Hyde Park (2009)	Blur 21 (2012)	Parklive (2012)

Damon Albarn chronology
Dr Dee (2012)	Blur 21 (2012)	Parklive (2012)

Blur 21 is a CD, DVD and vinyl box set encompassing the vast majority of music by Blur. It was released on 30 July 2012, commemorating the 21st anniversary of the release of the first Blur album, Leisure. The release took place before Blur's performance at Hyde Park as part of the 2012 Summer Olympics closing ceremony. One version consists of eighteen CDs, three DVDs, one vinyl 7" record (of the early Seymour track "Superman") and a hardcover biography book. The CDs contain all seven Blur studio albums released at the time, with the first five remastered, and with each album receiving a new second disc of B-side material, and four discs containing mostly previously unreleased material. The DVDs contain Showtime, The Singles Night and an all-new rarities disc.

Another boxset, Blur 21 Vinyl Edition, was released at the same time, featuring Blur's seven studio albums on heavyweight vinyl, each of the LPs repackaged as a double album except for Leisure, a single album. The vinyl edition contains no previously unreleased material. As above, the Blur 21 CD/DVD/7" single pack contains many previously unreleased recordings, including the long-awaited releases of songs like "Pap Pop," "Beached Whale" and "Sir Elton John's Cock".

The box set also includes a special code to download all the music content as MP3, along with all the Blurb magazine issues and extra content with audio commentary and unreleased footage per album.

== Reception ==
Professional ratings
Aggregate scores
Source	Rating
Metacritic	92/100
Review scores
Source	Rating
AllMusic	4.5/5 stars
The Austin Chronicle	4/5 stars
The A.V. Club	B+
The Daily Telegraph	3/5 stars
The Guardian	4/5 stars
Paste	8.9/10
The Phoenix	4/4 stars
Pitchfork	8.5/10
PopMatters	9/10
Under the Radar	9.5/10

Blur 21 received positive reviews. On Metacritic, it has a score of 92 out of 100, based on 17 reviews. Stephen Thomas Erlewine of AllMusic wrote, "There were plenty of other great British bands of the '90s but none of their peers – Oasis, Suede, Pulp, Radiohead – covered as much stylistic ground or wound up with a catalog as rich as this ridiculously generous box set handily proves."

== Track listing ==
Disc 1: Leisure
No.	Title	Length
1.	"She's So High"	4:46
2.	"Bang"	3:37
3.	"Slow Down"	3:11
4.	"Repetition"	5:26
5.	"Bad Day"	4:24
6.	"Sing"	6:01
7.	"There's No Other Way"	3:25
8.	"Fool"	3:14
9.	"Come Together"	3:52
10.	"High Cool"	3:38
11.	"Birthday"	3:50
12.	"Wear Me Down"	4:52

Disc 2: Leisure (Bonus Material)
No.	Title	Length
1.	"I Know (Extended Mix)"	6:31
2.	"Down"	5:59
3.	"There's No Other Way (Extended Version)"	3:59
4.	"Inertia"	3:49
5.	"Mr Briggs"	3:59
6.	"I'm All Over"	2:00
7.	"Won't Do It"	3:20
8.	"Day Upon Day (Live)"	4:14
9.	"There's No Other Way (Blur Remix)"	4:57
10.	"Bang (Extended Version)"	4:26
11.	"Explain"	2:45
12.	"Luminous"	3:14
13.	"Berserk"	6:43
14.	"Uncle Love"	2:31
15.	"I Love Her (Demo Version) (Fan Club Single)"	3:36
16.	"Close (Fan Club Single)"	3:03
17.	"High Cool (Dub)" (Japan Exclusive Bonus Track)	3:41

Disc 3: Modern Life Is Rubbish
No.	Title	Length
1.	"For Tomorrow"	4:21
2.	"Advert"	3:45
3.	"Colin Zeal"	3:16
4.	"Pressure on Julian"	3:32
5.	"Star Shaped"	3:27
6.	"Blue Jeans"	3:55
7.	"Chemical World" (Includes "Intermission")	6:34
8.	"Sunday Sunday"	2:38
9.	"Oily Water"	5:01
10.	"Miss America"	5:35
11.	"Villa Rosie"	3:55
12.	"Coping"	3:25
13.	"Turn It Up"	3:23
14.	"Resigned" (Includes "Commercial Break")	6:13

Disc 4: Modern Life Is Rubbish (Bonus Material)
No.	Title	Length
1.	"Popscene"	3:15
2.	"Mace"	3:26
3.	"Badgeman Brown"	4:48
4.	"I'm Fine"	3:04
5.	"Garden Central"	6:00
6.	"For Tomorrow (Visit to Primrose Hill Extended Version)"	6:01
7.	"Into Another"	3:55
8.	"Peach"	3:58
9.	"Bone Bag"	4:04
10.	"Hanging Over"	4:28
11.	"When the Cows Come Home"	3:50
12.	"Beachcoma"	3:38
13.	"Chemical World (Reworked)"	3:45
14.	"Es Schmecht"	3:37
15.	"Young and Lovely"	5:03
16.	"Maggie May"	4:06
17.	"My Ark"	5:57
18.	"Daisy Bell (A Bicycle Made for Two)"	2:48
19.	"Let's All Go Down the Strand"	3:42

Disc 5: Parklife
No.	Title	Length
1.	"Girls & Boys"	4:51
2.	"Tracy Jacks"	4:20
3.	"End of a Century"	2:46
4.	"Parklife"	3:05
5.	"Bank Holiday"	1:42
6.	"Badhead"	3:26
7.	"The Debt Collector"	2:11
8.	"Far Out"	1:38
9.	"To the End"	4:05
10.	"London Loves"	4:15
11.	"Trouble in the Message Centre"	4:09
12.	"Clover Over Dover"	3:22
13.	"Magic America"	3:38
14.	"Jubilee"	2:48
15.	"This Is a Low"	5:17
16.	"Lot 105"	1:19

Disc 6: Parklife (Bonus Material)
No.	Title	Length
1.	"Magpie"	4:16
2.	"Anniversary Waltz"	1:23
3.	"People in Europe"	3:28
4.	"Peter Panic"	4:22
5.	"Girls & Boys (Pet Shop Boys 12" Remix)"	7:17
6.	"Threadneedle Street"	3:18
7.	"Got Yer!"	1:48
8.	"Beard"	1:45
9.	"To the End (French Version)"	4:06
10.	"Supa Shoppa"	3:02
11.	"Theme From An Imaginary Film"	3:35
12.	"Red Necks"	2:54
13.	"Alex's Song"	2:45
14.	"Jubilee (Acoustic)"	2:33
15.	"Parklife (Acoustic)"	3:00
16.	"End of a Century (Cadena 40 Principales Acoustic Version)"	2:44
17.	"Girls & Boys (Demo)" (Japan Exclusive Bonus Track)	4:55

Disc 7: The Great Escape
No.	Title	Length
1.	"Stereotypes"	3:11
2.	"Country House"	3:57
3.	"Best Days"	4:49
4.	"Charmless Man"	3:34
5.	"Fade Away"	4:19
6.	"Top Man"	4:01
7.	"The Universal"	3:59
8.	"Mr. Robinson's Quango"	4:01
9.	"He Thought of Cars"	4:16
10.	"It Could Be You"	3:13
11.	"Ernold Same"	2:07
12.	"Globe Alone"	2:23
13.	"Dan Abnormal"	3:24
14.	"Entertain Me"	4:19
15.	"Yuko and Hiro"	5:24

Disc 8: The Great Escape (Bonus Material)
No.	Title	Length
1.	"One Born Every Minute"	2:19
2.	"To the End (La Comedie)"	5:06
3.	"Ultranol"	2:43
4.	"No Monsters in Me"	3:38
5.	"Entertain Me (Live It! Remix)"	7:17
6.	"The Man Who Left Himself"	3:23
7.	"Tame"	4:47
8.	"Ludwig"	2:24
9.	"The Horrors"	3:18
10.	"A Song"	1:45
11.	"St Louis"	3:14
12.	"Country House (Live at Mile End)"	4:58
13.	"Girls & Boys (Live at Mile End)"	5:03
14.	"Parklife (Live at Mile End)"	3:43
15.	"For Tomorrow (Live at Mile End)"	7:02
16.	"Charmless Man (Live at the Budokan)"	3:22
17.	"Chemical World (Live at the Budokan)"	4:12
18.	"Eine Kleine Lift Musik"	4:19
19.	"It Could Be You (Live at The BBC)" (Japan Exclusive Bonus Track)	3:07

Disc 9: Blur
No.	Title	Length
1.	"Beetlebum"	5:05
2.	"Song 2"	2:01
3.	"Country Sad Ballad Man"	4:50
4.	"M.O.R."	3:27
5.	"On Your Own"	4:26
6.	"Theme from Retro"	3:37
7.	"You're So Great"	3:36
8.	"Death of a Party"	4:34
9.	"Chinese Bombs"	1:25
10.	"I'm Just a Killer For Your Love"	4:12
11.	"Look Inside America"	3:50
12.	"Strange News from Another Star"	4:03
13.	"Movin' On"	3:43
14.	"Essex Dogs" (Includes "Interlude")	8:10

Disc 10: Blur (Bonus Material)
No.	Title	Length
1.	"All Your Life"	4:12
2.	"A Spell (For Money)"	3:30
3.	"Woodpigeon Song"	1:43
4.	"Dancehall"	3:11
5.	"Get Out of Cities"	4:03
6.	"Polished Stone"	2:43
7.	"Bustin' + Dronin'"	6:32
8.	"M.O.R. (Road Version)"	3:02
9.	"Swallows in the Heatwave"	2:33
10.	"Death of a Party (7" Remix)"	4:19
11.	"Cowboy Song"	4:07
12.	"Beetlebum (Live Acoustic Version)"	4:34
13.	"On Your Own (Live Acoustic Version)"	4:11
14.	"Country Sad Ballad Man (Live Acoustic Version)"	4:44
15.	"This Is a Low (Live Acoustic Version)"	3:32
16.	"M.O.R. (Live in Utrecht)"	3:18
17.	"Death of a Party (Live in Utrecht)"	4:16
18.	"Song 2 (Live in Utrecht)"	2:07
19.	"Movin' On (Mario Caldato Jr. Mix)" (Japan Exclusive Bonus Track)	3:46

Disc 11: 13
No.	Title	Length
1.	"Tender"	7:41
2.	"Bugman"	4:48
3.	"Coffee & TV"	5:59
4.	"Swamp Song"	4:37
5.	"1992"	5:29
6.	"B.L.U.R.E.M.I."	2:52
7.	"Battle"	7:44
8.	"Mellow Song"	3:57
9.	"Trailerpark"	4:27
10.	"Caramel"	7:38
11.	"Trimm Trabb"	5:38
12.	"No Distance Left to Run"	3:28
13.	"Optigan 1"	2:34

Disc 12: 13 (Bonus Material)
No.	Title	Length
1.	"French Song"	8:21
2.	"All We Want"	4:33
3.	"Mellow Jam"	3:56
4.	"X-Offender (Damon/Control Freak's Bugman Remix)"	5:38
5.	"Coyote (Dave's Bugman Remix)"	3:50
6.	"Trade Stylee (Alex's Bugman Remix)"	5:58
7.	"Metal Hip Slop (Graham's Bugman Remix)"	4:16
8.	"So You"	4:11
9.	"Beagle 2"	2:54
10.	"Tender (Cornelius Remix)"	5:23
11.	"Far Out (Beagle 2 Remix)"	3:58
12.	"I Got Law (Demo)"	2:43
13.	"Music Is My Radar"	5:29
14.	"Black Book"	8:31
15.	"Caramel (Remix)" (Japan Exclusive Bonus Track)	4:54

Disc 13: Think Tank
No.	Title	Length
1.	"Ambulance"	5:09
2.	"Out of Time"	3:51
3.	"Crazy Beat"	3:15
4.	"Good Song"	3:09
5.	"On the Way to the Club"	3:48
6.	"Brothers and Sisters"	3:47
7.	"Caravan"	4:36
8.	"We've Got a File on You"	1:02
9.	"Moroccan People's Revolutionary Bowls Club"	3:03
10.	"Sweet Song"	4:01
11.	"Jets"	6:25
12.	"Gene by Gene"	3:49
13.	"Battery in Your Leg" (Includes "Me, White Noise")	11:35

Disc 14: Think Tank (Bonus Material)
No.	Title	Length
1.	"Money Makes Me Crazy (Marrakech Mix)"	2:53
2.	"Tune 2"	3:48
3.	"The Outsider"	5:14
4.	"Don't Be"	2:40
5.	"Morricone"	4:50
6.	"Me, White Noise (Alternate Version)"	6:44
7.	"Some Glad Morning (Fan Club Single)"	4:19
8.	"Don't Be (Acoustic Mix)"	2:39
9.	"Sweet Song (Demo)"	3:50
10.	"Caravan (XFM Session)"	4:15
11.	"End of a Century (XFM Session)"	2:41
12.	"Good Song (XFM Session)"	3:31
13.	"Out of Time (XFM Session)"	3:36
14.	"Tender (XFM Session)"	6:21
15.	"Crazy Beat (Jo Whiley BBC Session)" (Japan Exclusive Bonus Track)	3:12

Disc 15: Rarities 1: Seymour & Leisure era
No.	Title	Length
1.	"Dizzy (Seymour Rehearsal & Demo)"	3:34
2.	"Mixed Up (Seymour Rehearsal & Demo)"	3:52
3.	"Birthday (Seymour Demo)"	4:33
4.	"Sing (To Me) (Sing Demo) (Fan Club Single)"	5:29
5.	"Fool (Seymour 4-Track Demo)"	2:37
6.	"She's So High (Seymour Rehearsal)"	11:33
7.	"Won't Do It (Demo) (Fan Club Single)"	3:12
8.	"I Know (Falconer Studio Demo)"	3:56
9.	"Repetition (Falconer Studio Demo)"	5:13
10.	"High Cool (7" Master)"	3:40
11.	"Always (I'm Fine Early Version)"	2:58
12.	"Come Together (Demo) (Fan Club Single)"	3:34
13.	"I'm All Over (Demo)"	1:52
14.	"Wear Me Down (Demo)"	5:33

Disc 16: Rarities 2: Modern Life Is Rubbish era
No.	Title	Length
1.	"I Love Her (Alternative Version)"	3:40
2.	"Popscene (1991 Demo)"	3:45
3.	"Beached Whale (4-Track Demo)"	3:24
4.	"Death of a Party (Demo) (Fan Club Single)"	3:41
5.	"Pap Pop (4-Track Demo)"	2:25
6.	"Pressure on Julian (Demo)"	4:27
7.	"Colin Zeal (Demo)"	3:32
8.	"Sunday Sunday (Demo)"	2:12
9.	"Never Clever"	2:52
10.	"Advert (Demo)"	3:45
11.	"Star Shaped (Demo)"	3:05
12.	"She Don't Mind (Blue Jeans Demo)"	3:52
13.	"Coping (Andy Partridge Version)"	3:22
14.	"Sunday Sunday (Andy Partridge Version)"	3:31
15.	"Seven Days (Andy Partridge Version)"	3:42
16.	"Kazoo (Turn It Up Early Version)"	3:16
17.	"The Wassailing Song (The 7" Give-Away at Hibernian Club, Fulham)"	3:24
18.	"When the Cows Come Home (Demo)"	3:26
19.	"For Tomorrow (Mix 1 – Early Demo)"	4:15
20.	"Magpie (Early Demo)"	2:05
21.	"Turn It Up (Demo)" (Japan Exclusive Bonus Track)	3:12

Disc 17: Rarities 3: Parklife & The Great Escape era
No.	Title	Length
1.	"Parklife (Demo)"	3:09
2.	"Clover Over Dover (Demo)"	2:55
3.	"Jubilee (Demo)"	2:51
4.	"One Minute (One Born Every Minute Demo)"	2:14
5.	"Badhead (Demo)"	3:07
6.	"Far Out (Electric Version)"	3:17
7.	"The Debt Collector (Demo)"	2:12
8.	"Trouble in the Message Centre (Demo)"	3:37
9.	"Rednecks (Take 1)"	2:46
10.	"Rednecks (Take 2)"	1:00
11.	"Alex's Song (Demo)"	3:10
12.	"Cross Channel Love (Home Demo)"	3:17
13.	"Ernold Same (Demo)"	1:20
14.	"Saturday Morning (Demo)"	4:33
15.	"Hope You Find Your Suburb (Eine Kleine Lift Musik Demo)"	4:13
16.	"Rico (Fade Away Demo)"	5:08
17.	"Bored House Wives (Entertain Me Early Version)"	4:57

Disc 18: Rarities 4: Blur, 13, The Best Of & Think Tank era
No.	Title	Length
1.	"Beetlebum (Demo)"	3:00
2.	"On Your Own (Mario Caldato Jr. Mix)"	4:21
3.	"Woodpigeon Song (Original Full Version)"	3:01
4.	"Battle (Jam, Mayfair Studios 11 August 1998)"	5:46
5.	"Caramel (Ambient version)"	7:47
6.	"So You (Alternate Version)"	3:46
7.	"Squeezebox (Music Is My Radar Alternate Version)"	6:34
8.	"Jawbone (Black Book Alternate Version)"	5:33
9.	"1 (Bill Laswell Session, 2000)"	3:39
10.	"3 (Bill Laswell Session, 2000)"	4:50
11.	"Sir Elton John's Cock"	1:24
12.	"Avoid the Traffic"	1:30
13.	"Money Makes Me Crazy (Deepest Darkest Devon Mix)"	2:29
14.	"Don't Bomb When You're the Bomb"	3:59
15.	"Nutter"	2:42
16.	"Piano"	3:19
17.	"Kissin Time (Marianne Faithfull Featuring Blur)"	5:39
18.	"Fool's Day"	3:29
19.	"Under the Westway (early version)"	4:18

Disc 19: DVD: Showtime (Parklife era)
No.	Title	Length
1.	"Lot 105"
2.	"Sunday Sunday"
3.	"Jubilee"
4.	"Tracy Jacks"
5.	"Magic America"
6.	"End of a Century"
7.	"Popscene"
8.	"Trouble in the Message Centre"
9.	"She's So High"
10.	"Chemical World"
11.	"Badhead"
12.	"There's No Other Way"
13.	"To the End"
14.	"Advert"
15.	"Supa Shoppa"
16.	"Mr. Robinson's Quango"
17.	"Parklife"
18.	"Girls & Boys"
19.	"Bank Holiday"
20.	"This Is a Low"

Disc 20: DVD: The Singles Night (10 Yr Boxset era)
No.	Title	Length
1.	"I Know"
2.	"She's So High"
3.	"There's No Other Way"
4.	"Popscene"
5.	"For Tomorrow"
6.	"Chemical World"
7.	"Girls & Boys"
8.	"To the End"
9.	"Parklife"
10.	"End of a Century"
11.	"Country House"
12.	"The Universal"
13.	"Charmless Man"
14.	"Beetlebum"
15.	"Song 2"
16.	"On Your Own"
17.	"M.O.R."
18.	"Tender"
19.	"Coffee & TV"
20.	"No Distance Left to Run"

Disc 21: DVD: Live 13 & Bonus Footage (tracks 1–9: 13 era)
No.	Title	Length
1.	"B.L.U.R.E.M.I. (Live at The Depot)"
2.	"No Distance Left to Run (Live at The Depot)"
3.	"Tender (Live at The Depot)"
4.	"Battle (Live at The Depot)"
5.	"Beetlebum (Live at The Depot)"
6.	"Bugman (Live at The Depot)"
7.	"Trimm Trabb (Live at The Depot)"
8.	"Mellow Song (Live at The Depot)"
9.	"Song 2 (Live at The Depot)"
10.	"Dizzy"
11.	"There's No Other Way (Live on Eggs N Baker)"
12.	"To the End (La Comedie)"
13.	"It Could Be You"
14.	"Music is My Radar"
15.	"Out of Time"
16.	"Crazy Beat"
17.	"Good Song"

Disc 22: 7": Superman (Seymour era)
No.	Title	Length
1.	"Superman (Live at The Square)"
