= Showtime (video) =

Video by Blur
- Released: 13 February 1995 (VHS) 30 July 2012 (DVD)
- Recorded: 7 October 1994
- Venue: Alexandra Palace
- Genre: Britpop, Indie rock
- Length: 87 mins
- Label: EMI

Blur chronology
Starshaped (1993)	Showtime (1995)	No Distance Left to Run (2010)

Showtime is a video recording by British rock band Blur, released in February 1995. Directed and edited by Matthew Longfellow and produced by Ceri Levy, the film is a recording of the band's gig at Alexandra Palace, London, England on 7 October 1994. For many years, the video has only been released in the UK on VHS. A cult following to get it released on DVD occurred amongst fans, which became successful as a DVD version is included on Blur 21 boxset, released 30 July 2012.

== Track listing ==
1. "Lot 105"
2. "Sunday Sunday"
3. "Jubilee"
4. "Tracy Jacks"
5. "Magic America"
6. "End of a Century"
7. "Popscene"
8. "Trouble in the Message Centre"
9. "She's So High"
10. "Chemical World"
11. "Badhead"
12. "There's No Other Way"
13. "To the End"
14. "Advert"
15. "Supa Shoppa"
16. "Mr. Robinson's Quango"
17. "Parklife"
18. "Girls & Boys"
19. "Bank Holiday"
20. "This Is a Low"
