= No Distance Left to Run (film) =

- Film poster
- Directed by: Dylan Southern; Will Lovelace
- Produced by: Lucas Ochoa; Thomas Benski
- Starring: Damon Albarn; Graham Coxon; Alex James; Dave Rowntree
- Cinematography: Ross McLennan; Dylan Southern
- Edited by: Dylan Southern
- Music by: Blur
- Production company: Pulse Films
- Distributed by: Arts Alliance Media
- Release date: 19 January 2010
- Running time: 101 minutes
- Country: United Kingdom
- Language: English

No Distance Left to Run is a documentary film about the British rock band Blur, released in cinemas on 19 January 2010. Following the band during their 2009 reunion and tour, the film also includes unseen archive footage and interviews. It was released on DVD on 15 February 2010 region free and the recording of the 2009 Hyde Park concert is included on a second disc. It aired on BBC2 on 14 March 2010. It is the band's second documentary video, following Starshaped seventeen years before in 1993.

== Track listing ==
=== DVD one ===
No Distance Left to Run

1. No Distance Left to Run (the film)
2. Theatrical trailer

=== DVD two ===
Live at Hyde Park (filmed 2 July 2009)

1. "Intro"
2. "She's So High"
3. "Girls & Boys"
4. "Tracy Jacks"
5. "There's No Other Way"
6. "Jubilee"
7. "Badhead"
8. "Beetlebum"
9. "Out of Time"
10. "Trimm Trabb"
11. "Coffee & TV"
12. "Tender"
13. "Country House"
14. "Oily Water"
15. "Chemical World"
16. "Sunday Sunday"
17. "Parklife"
18. "End of a Century"
19. "To the End"
20. "This Is a Low"
21. "Popscene"
22. "Advert"
23. "Song 2"
24. "Death of a Party"
25. "For Tomorrow"
26. "The Universal"

== Reception ==
The film received mostly positive reviews from critics.

On the review aggregator website Rotten Tomatoes, 93% of 14 critics' reviews are positive.

=== Awards ===
In December 2010, No Distance Left to Run was nominated as Best Long Form Music Video for the 53rd Grammy Awards. The situation was unique because this was the first time when Blur were up for a Grammy Award. Eventually they lost out to a documentary about The Doors, When You're Strange.
