= Starshaped =

- Directed by: Matthew Longfellow
- Produced by: Ceri Levy
- Starring: Blur
- Edited by: Ceri Levy; Darren Richardson; Matthew Longfellow; Neil Cunningham
- Music by: Blur
- Distributed by: Parlophone, Ventura Distribution
- Release date: 12 September 1993
- Running time: 60 minutes
- Language: English

Starshaped is a 1993 documentary film on the British band Blur. Conceived as a fly on the wall documentary, it became a collection of live performances, videos and festival footage, and band interviews.

Highlights include the band's performance at the 1991 Reading Festival and a brief interview with John Peel, and the band's 1992 appearance at the Glastonbury Festival when singer Damon Albarn lunges into a PA speaker which falls, injuring his foot. The band are regularly captured in drunken states through the film, sometimes arguing and even (in Albarn's case) vomiting. The majority of the music in the film comes from the band's first two albums, Leisure and Modern Life Is Rubbish, although the non-album tracks "Popscene" and "Day Upon Day" are also included.

Several fans give their verdict on Blur, particularly on how the band have perfected their live act. The band's manager also appears in some scenes, although his face is blanked out. Two German fans seem obsessed with the band and Damon Albarn in particular, having followed the group from New York to England to Germany.

== Release ==
The film was released on DVD in 2004.

== Reception ==
A rather positive review stated, "Starshaped, from director Matthew Longfellow, makes for a good enough inclusion to his music-based filmography. He tours the green and somewhat pleasant lands of England as the band tour through Reading 1991, and subsequently with their Modern Life is Rubbish setlist. Helped along masterfully by their early perfection with There’s No Other Way, there is a redemptive state to Starshaped that aids the band and audience along. "

== Track listing ==
=== VHS ===
Starshaped

1. "Intermission" – 0:10
2. "Explain" – 2:28 (mislabeled "Can't Explain")
3. "There's No Other Way" – 2:39
4. "Inertia" – 0:51 (mislabeled "Luminous")
5. "She's So High" – 1:59
6. "Colin Zeal" – 3:08
7. "Popscene" – 3:12
8. "When Will We Be Married" – 0:34
9. "Sunday Sunday" – 2:53
10. "Wassailing Song" – 2:13
11. "Coping" – 3:05
12. "Day Upon Day" – 3:43
13. "For Tomorrow" – 4:37
14. "Postman Pat Theme" – 0:29
15. "Chemical World" – 4:07
16. "Advert" – 4:01
17. "Commercial Break" – 0:52
18. "Sunday Sunday" – 2:53

Promo clips

1. "She's So High"
2. "There's No Other Way"
3. "Bang!"
4. "Pop Scene"
5. "For Tomorrow"
6. "Chemical World"
7. "Sunday Sunday"

=== DVD ===
Starshaped

1. "Intermission"
2. "Explain" (mislabeled "Can't Explain")
3. "There's No Other Way"
4. "Luminous" (misprint, actually "Inerita")
5. "She Is So High"
6. "Colin Zeal"
7. "Pop Scene"
8. "When Will We Be Married"
9. "Sunday Sunday"
10. "Wassailing Song"
11. "Coping"
12. "Day Upon Day"
13. "For Tomorrow"
14. "Chemical World"
15. "Advert"
16. "Commercial Break"

Live in Kilburn

1. "Popscene"
2. "Fool"
3. "High Cool"
4. "Bad Day"
5. "Oily Water"
6. "Slow Down"
7. "There's No Other Way"
8. "Turn It Up"
9. "She's So High"
10. "Wear Me Down"
11. "Come Together"
12. "Day Upon Day"
13. "Sing"
14. "Explain"
15. "Outro" ("Commercial Break")

Live at the Princess Charlotte

1. "Won't Do It"
2. "There's No Other Way"
3. "High Cool"
4. "Wear Me Down"

Easter egg (hidden track)

1. "There's No Other Way" (US music video)
