= To the End (2024 film) =

2024 documentary film

- Film poster
- Directed by: Toby L.
- Produced by: Josh Connolly
- Starring: Blur
- Cinematography: Sebastian Cort; Rhys Warren
- Edited by: Danny Abel
- Music by: Blur; Mike Smith
- Production company: Up the Game
- Release dates: 14 June 2024 (Sheffield DocFest); 19 July 2024 (United Kingdom)
- Running time: 105 minutes
- Country: United Kingdom
- Language: English
- Box office: $336,330

To the End is a 2024 British documentary film about the rock band Blur's reunion in the 2020s and their first album in eight years, The Ballad of Darren. The film is directed by Toby L. It premiered at Sheffield DocFest on 14 June 2024. It was released in the United Kingdom and Ireland on 19 July 2024.

It is the fourth documentary film about the band after Starshaped (1993), No Distance Left to Run (2010), and New World Towers (2015).

== Reception ==
On the review aggregator website Rotten Tomatoes, 90% of 20 critics' reviews are positive, with an average rating of 8.1/10. Metacritic, which uses a weighted average, assigned the film a score of 73 out of 100, based on eight critics, indicating "generally favorable" reviews.

Andrew Trendell of NME gave the film five out of five stars and wrote, "While Blur's last doc and accompanying live movie No Distance Left To Run was a portrait of a band celebrating their legacy and giving a nostalgia-hungry world exactly what they craved, this spiritual sequel shows a band simply supporting each other. Whether they return again or not remains to be seen. But even if they don't, this was one hell of a final fling."
