= Go Out (song) =

Single by Blur

from the album The Magic Whip
- Released: 19 February 2015
- Genre: Britpop; alternative rock
- Length: 4:41
- Label: Parlophone
- Songwriters: Damon Albarn; Graham Coxon; Alex James; Dave Rowntree
- Producers: Stephen Street; Graham Coxon; Damon Albarn

Blur singles chronology
"Under the Westway" (2012)	"Go Out" (2015)	"There Are Too Many of Us" (2015)

Music video
- "Go Out" on YouTube

"Go Out" is a song by English rock band Blur. It is the lead single from their eighth studio album The Magic Whip. A music video for the song was released on YouTube on 19 February 2015.

== Personnel ==
- Damon Albarn – vocals
- Graham Coxon – guitar
- Alex James – bass guitar
- Dave Rowntree – drums

== Charts ==
Chart (2015)	Peak position
Belgium (Ultratip Bubbling Under Flanders)	64
Belgium (Ultratip Bubbling Under Wallonia)	42
France (SNEP)	188
