= The Special Collectors Edition =

Compilation album of B-Sides by Blur
- Released: 26 October 1994
- Recorded: 1990–1994
- Genre: Britpop
- Length: 57:43
- Label: Food TOCP-8395
- Producer: Stephen Street, Steve Lovell, Blur and John Smith

Blur chronology
Parklife (1994)	The Special Collectors Edition (1994)	The Brit Pop Blur Box (1994)

Professional ratings
Review scores
Source	Rating
AllMusic	2.5/5 stars

The Special Collectors Edition is a collection of B-sides by Blur, released on CD in Japan in 1994.

It received a limited worldwide release on vinyl for Record Store Day 2023.

The B-sides are from singles from the albums Leisure, Modern Life Is Rubbish and Parklife. The last track is not a B-side but actually a recording of fans singing "Bank Holiday" at Narita Airport, Tokyo.

== Track listing ==
No.	Title	Length
1.	"Day Upon Day (Live at Moles Club, Bath, 19 December 1990)"	4:03
2.	"Inertia"	3:48
3.	"Luminous"	3:12
4.	"Mace"	3:25
5.	"Badgeman Brown"	4:47
6.	"Hanging Over"	4:27
7.	"Peach"	3:57
8.	"When The Cows Come Home"	3:49
9.	"Maggie May"	4:05
10.	"Es Schmecht"	3:35
11.	"Fried (featuring Seymour)"	2:34
12.	"Anniversary Waltz"	1:24
13.	"Threadneedle Street"	3:18
14.	"Got Yer!"	1:48
15.	"Supa Shoppa"	3:02
16.	"Beard"	1:45
17.	"Theme From An Imaginary Film"	3:34
18.	"Bank Holiday"	1:10
Total length:		57:43

== Production credits ==
- Blur: "Inertia", "Luminous", "Mace", "Badgeman Brown", "Es Schmecht", "Threadneedle Street", and "Got Yer!"
- Blur and John Smith: "Hanging Over", "Peach", "Supa Shoppa" and "Beard"
- Steve Lovell: "Maggie May"
- Stephen Street: "When the Cows Come Home", "Anniversary Waltz" and "Theme from an Imaginary Film"

== Charts ==
=== Weekly charts ===
Chart (1994-2023)	Peak position
Japanese Albums (Oricon)	64
UK Albums (OCC)	86
