= Lonesome Street =

Single by Blur

from the album The Magic Whip
- Released: 2 April 2015
- Genre: Alternative rock
- Length: 4:23
- Label: Parlophone
- Songwriters: Damon Albarn; Graham Coxon; Alex James; Dave Rowntree
- Producers: Stephen Street; Graham Coxon; Damon Albarn

Blur singles chronology
"There Are Too Many of Us" (2015)	"Lonesome Street" (2015)	"Ong Ong" (2015)

Music video
- "Lonesome Street" on YouTube

"Lonesome Street" is a song by English rock band Blur. It was released on 2 April 2015 as the third single from their eighth studio album, The Magic Whip (2015). "Lonesome Street" was released to American radio on 30 March 2015.

== Track listing ==
All tracks are written by Damon Albarn, Graham Coxon, Alex James and Dave Rowntree.

No.	Title	Length
1.	"Lonesome Street" (Radio Edit)	3:21
2.	"Lonesome Street" (Album Version)	4:23
3.	"Lonesome Street" (Instrumental)	4:23
Total length:		12:07

== Charts ==
Chart (2015)	Peak position
Belgium (Ultratip Bubbling Under Flanders)	8
Belgium (Ultratip Bubbling Under Wallonia)	23
France (SNEP)	181

== Personnel ==
Blur

- Damon Albarn – lead vocals, production
- Graham Coxon – co-lead vocals, guitar, production
- Alex James – bass guitar
- Dave Rowntree – drums

Additional personnel

- Stephen Street – production, additional recording, arpeggiated synth, percussion programming
- Stephen Sedgwick – recording, mixing
- John Davis – mastering
