= The Magic Whip =

Studio album by Blur
- Released: 27 April 2015
- Recorded: May 2013, November 2014 – January 2015
- Studios: Avon Studios, Hong Kong; Studio 13, London
- Genres: Alternative rock; art rock; indie rock
- Length: 51:42
- Labels: Parlophone; Warner Bros.
- Producers: Stephen Street; Graham Coxon; Damon Albarn

Blur chronology
Parklive (2012)	The Magic Whip (2015)	The Ballad of Darren (2023)

Damon Albarn chronology
Terry Riley's In C Mali (2015)	The Magic Whip (2015)	Songs from wonder.land (2016)

Singles from The Magic Whip
- 1. "Go Out" Released: 19 February 2015; 2. "There Are Too Many of Us" Released: 20 March 2015; 3. "Lonesome Street" Released: 2 April 2015; 4. "Ong Ong" Released: 3 June 2015; 5. "I Broadcast" Released: 8 September 2015

The Magic Whip (stylised in Chinese text as 魔鞭) is the eighth studio album by English rock band Blur. Recorded in Hong Kong and London, it was released by Parlophone in the United Kingdom on 27 April 2015 and a day later by Warner Bros. Records in the United States. It was the band's first studio album in 12 years, marking the longest gap between studio albums in Blur's career, and the first in 16 years since 13 (1999) to have featured the original line-up (Coxon featuring on only one song on Think Tank). The album also marked the return of the band's longtime producer Stephen Street following Blur (1997).

The album received acclaim from music critics. It debuted at number one on the UK Albums Chart, marking Blur's sixth UK number-one album. It was certified Gold by the British Phonographic Industry (BPI) for sales of over 100,000 copies. It was the first album by the band in North America under Warner Bros., after Blur were transferred from Virgin Records in 2013, following the purchase of EMI and its assets by the Universal Music Group in 2012.

== Background ==
In May 2013, Blur were set to play Japan's Tokyo Rocks Music festival. However, the entire festival was canceled for unknown reasons, leaving the band stranded in Hong Kong for an extra five days. In an attempt to distract themselves, they worked on new material in Avon Studios, as announced by lead singer Damon Albarn during the gig at AsiaWorld–Expo, Chek Lap Kok. Albarn later stated he was unsure whether the resulting music would ever be released. In July 2014, he commented, "There are about 15 songs...the annoying thing is, if I'd been able to write the lyrics there and then about being there, we'd have finished the record. But sometimes, if you can't do it all at once, it dissipates really and I don't know what I'd sing about now with that record. There's some great tunes on there, but it may just be one of those records that never comes out."

In November 2014, Graham Coxon started to work further on the recordings with producer Stephen Street, while Albarn was touring his solo album, Everyday Robots (2014). Coxon commented "I kept thinking about the recordings we had made in Hong Kong and remembering how good it felt. I wouldn't have forgiven myself if I hadn't had another look". Coxon would secretly invite Alex James and Dave Rowntree to further recording sessions to build upon the material. Once nearing completion, Coxon presented the music to Albarn to see if it was worthy of an album. On the way back from his tour of Australia in December, Albarn stopped in Hong Kong once more for lyrical inspiration. Vocals were completed towards the end of January 2015 and the album's mastering was finished on 18 February 2015, the day before the album was announced to the press in London's Chinatown.

The album was reissued as a zoetrope picture disc for Record Store Day 2025.

== Artwork and title ==
The cover art has the words blur and magic whip written in Chinese surrounding an ice cream cone, and was created by Tony Hung, who created the music video for "Go Out". Hung met with Albarn in 2015 and was shown photos and ephemera from Albarn's travels in Hong Kong. Hung said that the album title was "multifaceted" as Albarn himself explained to him. "An ice cream in the UK, a firework in China and a 'whip' in a political sense."

== Promotion ==
The video for "Go Out" was uploaded to YouTube on 19 February 2015. Videos for "There Are Too Many of Us", "Lonesome Street", "Ong Ong", and "I Broadcast" followed on 20 March, 2 April, 3 June, and 8 September 2015, respectively. "Ong Ong", along with "My Terracotta Heart" and "I Broadcast" were previously made available shortly before the album's release as promotional singles, and their official audios were uploaded to YouTube on 18, 21 and 23 April 2015, respectively. "Y'all Doomed", the bonus track on the Japanese edition, was released as a 7-inch single on 27 April 2015. "Ghost Ship", alongside a re-release of "I Broadcast", were later released as promotional singles on 23 October 2015.

== Critical reception ==
Professional ratings
Aggregate scores
Source	Rating
AnyDecentMusic?	7.6/10
Metacritic	81/100
Review scores
Source	Rating
AllMusic	4/5 stars
The A.V. Club	B−
Chicago Tribune	3.5/4 stars
The Daily Telegraph	5/5 stars
The Guardian	4/5 stars
NME	8/10
Pitchfork	7.0/10
Q	4/5 stars
Rolling Stone	4/5 stars
Spin	8/10

At Metacritic, which assigns a normalised rating out of 100 to reviews from critics, the album received an average score of 81, indicating "universal acclaim", based on 35 reviews.

DIY magazine critic Stephen Ackroyd stated: "Their magic remains as strong as ever." Helen Brown of The Daily Telegraph stated that the album "turns out to be a triumphant comeback", and noted that "it retains the band's core identity while allowing ideas they'd fermented separately over the past decade to infuse their sound with mature and peculiar new flavour combinations." Andy Gill of The Independent gave the album a positive review, calling it "a beautiful comeback". Spin writer Andrew Unterberger gave the album an 8/10 rating and said, "Magic Whip is a fun album, nearly as much as any Gorillaz LPs", adding, "Magic Whip finds enough majesty and intrigue in the band's more meditative days to remain worthy company to any of the band's classic LPs." Writing for Rolling Stone and giving the album four out of five stars, David Fricke called the album "A dark, seductive set that cements a legacy", stating that "Blur have returned with inspiration to spare."

=== Accolades ===
Accolades for The Magic Whip
Publication	Accolade	Year	Rank
NME	NME's Albums of the Year 2015	2015	15
Stereogum	The 50 Best Albums of 2015	2015	23
Rolling Stone	50 Best Albums of 2015	2015	10

== Track listing ==
All tracks are written by Damon Albarn, Graham Coxon, Alex James and Dave Rowntree.

The Magic Whip track listing
No.	Title	Length
1.	"Lonesome Street"	4:23
2.	"New World Towers"	4:03
3.	"Go Out"	4:41
4.	"Ice Cream Man"	3:25
5.	"Thought I Was a Spaceman"	6:16
6.	"I Broadcast"	2:51
7.	"My Terracotta Heart"	4:05
8.	"There Are Too Many of Us"	4:25
9.	"Ghost Ship"	5:00
10.	"Pyongyang"	5:46
11.	"Ong Ong"	3:08
12.	"Mirrorball"	3:39
Total length:		51:42

Japanese edition bonus track
No.	Title	Length
13.	"Y'all Doomed"	3:57
Total length:		55:39

== Personnel ==
Blur

- Damon Albarn – vocals, keyboards, synths, iPad, acoustic guitar, production
- Graham Coxon – electric guitar, backing vocals, co-lead vocals on "Lonesome Street", "Thought I Was a Spaceman", and "Y'all Doomed", production
- Alex James – bass guitar
- Dave Rowntree – drums, percussion, backing vocals

Additional personnel

- Stephen Street – production, additional recording, mixing; synth (tracks 1, 5), percussion programming (track 1), drum programming (tracks 5, 6), cymbal swells (track 5), tambourine (8), "saxophone" (keys) (track 9), percussion (track 12)
- Stephen Sedgwick – recording, mixing
- James Dring – drum programming (track 7)
- Demon Strings – strings (tracks 8, 12)
  - Stella Page
  - Kotono Sato
  - Isabelle Dunn
  - Antonia Pagulatos
- John Davis – mastering

== Charts and certifications ==
=== Weekly charts ===
Weekly chart performance for The Magic Whip
Chart (2015–2025)	Peak position
Australian Albums (ARIA)	5
Austrian Albums (Ö3 Austria)	2
Belgian Albums (Ultratop Flanders)	5
Belgian Albums (Ultratop Wallonia)	8
Canadian Albums (Billboard)	15
Croatia International Albums (HDU)	12
Danish Albums (Hitlisten)	3
Dutch Albums (Album Top 100)	4
Finnish Albums (Suomen virallinen lista)	12
French Albums (SNEP)	3
German Albums (Offizielle Top 100)	3
Hungarian Albums (MAHASZ)	2
Irish Albums (IRMA)	1
Italian Albums (FIMI)	7
Japanese Albums (Oricon)	5
New Zealand Albums (RMNZ)	8
Norwegian Albums (VG-lista)	8
Polish Albums (ZPAV)	15
Portuguese Albums (AFP)	5
Scottish Albums (Official Charts)	1
South Korean International Albums (Circle)	31
Spanish Albums (Promusicae)	10
Swedish Albums (Sverigetopplistan)	30
Swiss Albums (Schweizer Hitparade)	4
UK Albums (Official Charts)	1
US Billboard 200	24
US Top Alternative Albums (Billboard)	2

=== Year-end charts ===
Year-end chart performance for The Magic Whip
Chart (2015)	Position
Belgian Albums (Ultratop Flanders)	85
French Albums (SNEP)	141
UK Albums (OCC)	59

=== Certifications ===
Certifications for The Magic Whip
Region	Certification	Certified units/sales
United Kingdom (BPI)	Gold	100,000^{*}
^{*} Sales figures based on certification alone.
