= On Your Own (Blur song) =

1997 single by Blur

Single by Blur

from the album Blur
- B-side: "Popscene" (live); "Song 2" (live); "Chinese Bombs" (live); "Movin' On" (live); "M.O.R." (live)
- Released: 16 June 1997
- Genre: Grunge; punk rock; hip-hop
- Length: 4:26
- Label: Food; Parlophone
- Composers: Damon Albarn; Graham Coxon; Alex James; Dave Rowntree
- Lyricist: Damon Albarn
- Producer: Stephen Street

Blur singles chronology
"Song 2" (1997)	"On Your Own" (1997)	"M.O.R." (1997)

Audio sample
- "On Your Own": file; help

Music video
- "On Your Own" on YouTube

"On Your Own" is a song by English rock band Blur. It was released as a single on 16 June 1997 from the band's self-titled album (1997). It charted at number five on the UK Singles Chart. Although it was not released under the Gorillaz name, Damon Albarn, frontman of both musical projects, has since referred to the song as 'one of the first ever Gorillaz tunes'.

== Music video ==
The music video for "On Your Own" was directed by Sophie Muller and recorded in Barcelona, in what at the time was an industrial site, by the Besos Water Tower.

== B-sides ==
The B-sides were all recorded at John Peel's home studio: Peel Acres. They were previously broadcast on BBC Radio 1 on 8 May 1997. Stickered copies of CD1 and the white vinyl 7-inch features the text 'includes POPSCENE'. This is because "Popscene" did not appear on the UK version of Modern Life is Rubbish and was, therefore, rare and sought after by fans until its inclusion on Midlife: A Beginner's Guide to Blur. The version that appears here merges into "Song 2". All of Blur's Peel Sessions were later released on the second disc of the Japan only compilation Bustin' + Dronin', an album that features three versions of "On Your Own".

== Track listings ==
All music was composed by Damon Albarn, Graham Coxon, Alex James, and Dave Rowntree. All lyrics were written by Albarn.

UK CD1

1. "On Your Own"
2. "Popscene" (live at Peel)
3. "Song 2" (live at Peel Acres)
4. "On Your Own" (live at Peel Acres)

UK CD2

1. "On Your Own"
2. "Chinese Bombs" (live at Peel Acres)
3. "Movin' On" (live at Peel Acres)
4. "M.O.R." (live at Peel Acres)

UK limited-edition 7-inch clear vinyl single

A1. "On Your Own"
B1. "Popscene" (live at Peel Acres)
B2. "Song 2" (live at Peel Acres)

Australian CD single ("On Your Own" / "Popscene")

1. "On Your Own" – 4:27
2. "Popscene" – 3:14
3. "Death of a Party" (Well Blurred remix) (remixed by Adrian Sherwood)
4. "Death of a Party" (Billy Whisker's mix) (remixed by William Orbit)

== Personnel ==
- Damon Albarn – lead vocals, keyboards
- Graham Coxon – guitar, backing vocals
- Alex James – bass guitar
- Dave Rowntree – drums, drum machine

== Charts ==
=== Weekly charts ===
Chart (1997–1998)	Peak position
Australia (ARIA) with "Popscene"	69
Europe (Eurochart Hot 100)	33
Iceland (Íslenski Listinn Topp 40)	20
Ireland (IRMA)	27
Scottish Singles Sales (Official Charts)	5
UK Singles (Official Charts)	5

=== Year-end charts ===
Chart (1997)	Position
UK Singles (OCC)	175
