= Song 2 =

1997 single by Blur

Single by Blur

from the album Blur
- B-side: "Get Out of Cities"; "Polished Stone"; "Bustin' + Dronin'"; "Country Sad Ballad Man" (live acoustic)
- Released: 7 April 1997
- Studio: Mayfair (London, England)
- Genre: Alternative rock; indie rock; punk rock; grunge
- Length: 2:02
- Label: Food; Parlophone
- Songwriters: Damon Albarn; Graham Coxon; Alex James; Dave Rowntree
- Producer: Stephen Street

Blur singles chronology
"Beetlebum" (1997)	"Song 2" (1997)	"On Your Own" (1997)

Music video
- "Song 2" on YouTube

Audio sample
- file; help

"Song 2" is a song by English rock band Blur. It is the second song on their eponymous fifth studio album. Released physically on 7 April 1997, "Song 2" peaked at number two on the UK Singles Chart and number four on the Australian ARIA Singles Chart. In the United States, it peaked at number 55 on the Billboard Hot 100 Airplay chart and number six on the Billboard Modern Rock Tracks chart. "Song 2" is certified triple platinum in the United Kingdom.

At the 1997 MTV Video Music Awards, "Song 2" was nominated for Best Group Video, and Best Alternative Video. At the 1998 Brit Awards, the song was nominated for Best British Single, and Best British Video. In 1998, BBC Radio 1 listeners voted "Song 2" the 15th Best Track Ever. In 2011, NME placed it number 79 on its list "150 Best Tracks of the Past 15 Years".

== Background ==
According to Graham Coxon, "Song 2" was intended to be a joke on the record company. Damon Albarn had recorded an acoustic demo of the song which was slower and contained the song's distinctive "woo-hoo" chorus in whistle form. Coxon then suggested that they increase the speed and perform the song loudly, with Coxon deliberately seeking out an amateurish guitar sound. From there, Coxon told Albarn to tell the record company that they wanted to release the song as a single to "blow the flipping record labels' heads off". To Coxon's surprise, record executives reacted positively. When asked if the band had any idea of the song's commercial appeal, Coxon replied, "We'd just thought it was way too extreme".

The track was originally nicknamed "Song 2" as a working title which represented its slot in the tracklist, but the name stuck. The song is two minutes and two seconds long, with two verses, two choruses and a hook featuring Albarn yelling "woo-hoo!" as the distorted bass comes in. It is the second song on Blur's self-titled album, as well as Blur: The Best Of, and was the second single released from the former album.

Some writers have stated that the song is intended to be a parody of the grunge genre, while others state that it was a parody of radio hits and the music industry with a punk rock chorus.

== Genres and influences ==
Musically, the song has been labelled alternative rock, indie rock, or punk rock. PopMatters described the song as a "[pastiche] [of] Seattle grunge and grubby lo-fi indie rock". Rolling Stone Australia called it "frankly grunge-flavoured".

== Critical reception and legacy ==
A reviewer from Music Week wrote: "This punky, new wavathon is more immediate than most of the cuts from their new album and all the better for the catchy 'woo-hoo' bits." David Sinclair from The Times noted "the American garageband banging and crashing" of the song. The song's intro has been called Graham Coxon's "finest moment".

NME made it single of the week at the time, and later ranked "Song 2" at number two on its end-of-year list of the Top 20 Singles of 1997, and later listed it as one of the best songs from the 1990s. It was also ranked number two on Triple J's Hottest 100 for 1997 in Australia. The song has become a fixture in sports stadiums.

== Commercial performance ==
In the UK, "Song 2" reached number two on the UK Singles Chart. It was also popular on rock radio stations in the US; consequently, it reached number 55 on the Billboard Hot 100 Airplay chart, number six on the Billboard Modern Rock Tracks chart, staying on that chart for 26 weeks, and number 25 on the Billboard Mainstream Rock Tracks chart. In Australia, the song peaked at number four on the ARIA Singles Chart, staying in the top 50 for 25 weeks.

== Music video ==
The music video for this song was directed by Sophie Muller, and it features the band playing in a small, secluded room with loud amplifiers behind them. During the choruses, the volume of the song sends the band members crashing against the walls and ground. The set used was modelled on that in the video for their pre-breakthrough single "Popscene". In 2022, the band uploaded a video onto their YouTube channel called "Song 2 Take 2", which shows previously unreleased footage of the video being shot in a single take. It was released in celebration of the 25th anniversary of the album.

== Live performances ==
On 20 October 2018, at the Demon Dayz Fest LA, Damon Albarn's other well-known band Gorillaz played the familiar "Song 2" theme but in characteristic Gorillaz style with dub/funk elements. While recognition was still dawning on the audience, Graham Coxon joined Gorillaz onstage and launched into his original riff before he and Gorillaz went on to perform the classic arrangement to an enthusiastic reception. Albarn played "Song 2" at the end of his only 2022 US solo performance to promote The Nearer the Fountain, More Pure the Stream Flows. Before he began, Albarn commented that he was asked if he'd perform the song by Los Angeles Times journalist Mikael Wood, "before [Wood] cast [Albarn] into the social media abyss".

== Track listings ==
All music was composed by Albarn, Coxon, James and Rowntree. All lyrics were written by Albarn.

UK CD1

1. "Song 2" – 2:02
2. "Get Out of Cities" – 4:02
3. "Polished Stone" – 2:42

UK CD2

1. "Song 2" – 2:02
2. "Bustin' + Dronin'" – 6:13
3. "Country Sad Ballad Man" (live acoustic version) – 4:59

UK 7-inch single and Italian CD single

1. "Song 2" – 2:02
2. "Get Out of Cities" – 4:02

French CD single

1. "Song 2" – 2:02
2. "Country Sad Ballad Man" (live acoustic version) – 4:41
3. "On Your Own" (live) – 4:10

Australian CD single

1. "Song 2" – 2:02
2. "Get Out of Cities" – 4:02
3. "Polished Stone" – 2:42
4. "Bustin' + Dronin'" – 6:13

Japanese mini-album

1. "Song 2" – 2:02
2. "Get Out of Cities" – 4:02
3. "Polished Stone" – 2:42
4. "Bustin' + Dronin'" – 6:13
5. "Beetlebum" (Mario Caldato Jr. mix) – 5:07
6. "Beetlebum" (instrumental) – 5:07
7. "Country Sad Ballad Man" (live acoustic) – 4:59
8. "On Your Own" (live acoustic) – 4:26

== Personnel ==
- Damon Albarn – vocals
- Graham Coxon – guitar, additional drums
- Alex James – bass guitar
- Dave Rowntree – drums

== Charts ==
=== Weekly charts ===
1997 weekly chart performance for "Song 2"
Chart (1997)	Peak position
Australia (ARIA)	4
Belgium (Ultratip Bubbling Under Flanders)	8
Canada Rock/Alternative (RPM)	1
Europe (Eurochart Hot 100)	15
Iceland (Íslenski Listinn Topp 40)	3
Ireland (IRMA)	10
Israel (IBA)	30
Netherlands (Dutch Top 40 Tipparade)	12
Netherlands (Single Top 100)	73
Scottish Singles Sales (Official Charts)	1
Sweden (Sverigetopplistan)	28
UK Singles (Official Charts)	2
UK Rock & Metal (Official Charts)	1
US Radio Songs (Billboard)	55
US Alternative Airplay (Billboard)	6
US Mainstream Rock Airplay (Billboard)	25

2013 weekly chart performance for "Song 2"
Chart (2013)	Peak position
France (SNEP)	198

2023 weekly chart performance for "Song 2"
Chart (2023)	Peak position
Japan Hot Overseas (Billboard Japan)	14

=== Year-end charts ===
Year-end chart performance for "Song 2"
Chart (1997)	Position
Australia (ARIA)	42
Brazil (Crowley)	82
Canada Rock/Alternative (RPM)	2
Iceland (Íslenski Listinn Topp 40)	54
UK Singles (OCC)	111
US Mainstream Rock Tracks (Billboard)	97
US Modern Rock Tracks (Billboard)	14

== Certifications ==
Certifications for "Song 2"
Region	Certification	Certified units/sales
Australia (ARIA)	Gold	35,000^{^}
Denmark (IFPI Danmark)	Gold	45,000^{‡}
Germany (BVMI)	Platinum	600,000^{‡}
Italy (FIMI)	2× Platinum	200,000^{‡}
New Zealand (RMNZ)	4× Platinum	120,000^{‡}
Spain (Promusicae)	Platinum	60,000^{‡}
United Kingdom (BPI)	3× Platinum	1,800,000^{‡}
^{^} Shipments figures based on certification alone.^{‡} Sales+streaming figures based on certification alone.

== Release history ==
Release dates and formats for "Song 2"
Region	Date	Format(s)	Label(s)	Ref.
United States	17 February 1997	Alternative radio	Virgin	
United Kingdom	7 April 1997	CD; cassette	Food; Parlophone	
Japan	8 May 1997	CD	Food; Parlophone	

== Covers and sampling ==
In 1997, Electronic Arts used "Song 2" as the intro theme for the SEGA Saturn and Sony PlayStation versions of their soccer game FIFA: Road to World Cup 98. It was the first time a licensed song appeared in an EA Sports title. EA's European marketing executive Tom Stone recalled in 2023 that the company contacted the band about the rights to "Song 2", and Albarn agreed on the condition that the band receive free tickets to the 1998 FIFA World Cup final. The song also appeared in advertisements for Starship Troopers the same year.

My Chemical Romance played the song at BBC Radio 1. The cover was later featured on the album "Radio 1's Live Lounge", released on 11 October 2006.

In 2010, Japanese rock band The Brilliant Green covered the song on their album Blackout.

Big Time Rush's 2012 single "Windows Down" includes samples of "Song 2".

In 2014, Imagine Dragons played "Song 2" at Lollapalooza Brazil and again in 2016 at Reading Festival.

In 2024, the song was heavily sampled by UK Hip-Hop artist Jeshi in his track "Total 90", which was featured during ITV Sport's coverage of England's Euro 2024 semi-final.

In 2026, The Electric Mayhem covered the song for the soundtrack to the thrill ride Rock 'n' Roller Coaster Starring The Muppets at Disney's Hollywood Studios.
