= Chemical World =

1993 single by Blur

Single by Blur

from the album Modern Life Is Rubbish
- B-side: "Maggie May"; "Es Schmecht"; "Young & Lovely"; "My Ark"; "Never Clever" (live); "Pressure on Julian" (live); "Come Together" (live)
- Released: 28 June 1993
- Genre: Britpop; neo-psychedelia
- Length: 4:02 (UK album version); 3:53 (radio edit); 3:45 (reworked/US album version); 6:34 (with "Intermission")
- Label: Food
- Composers: Damon Albarn; Graham Coxon; Alex James; Dave Rowntree
- Lyricist: Damon Albarn
- Producers: Stephen Street; Blur; Clive Langer; Alan Winstanley; Steve Lovell

Blur singles chronology
"For Tomorrow" (1993)	"Chemical World" (1993)	"Sunday Sunday" (1993)

Music video
- "Chemical World" on YouTube

"Chemical World" is a song by the English rock band Blur, included on their second album, Modern Life Is Rubbish (1993), and released in June 1993 by Food Records. The song was written by the band and produced by them with Stephen Street, Clive Langer, Alan Winstanley and Steve Lovell. It peaked at number 28 on the UK Singles Charts as well as number 27 on the US Billboard Modern Rock Tracks chart.

== Tracks ==
The single was released in the UK on 7-inch and 12-inch vinyl and two CDs. CD1 and the 12-inch featured the reworked demo version while CD2 and the 7-inch featured the Stephen Street version (in edited form on the 7-inch). The 12-inch and CD2 feature three exclusive tracks "Young & Lovely", "Es Schmecht" and "My Ark". "Young & Lovely" was hailed as one of the greatest "lost tracks" by Q in 2007.

CD1 features three tracks recorded live at Glastonbury Festival 1992. The song "Never Clever" had not been previously released. It was originally intended as the follow-up to Blur's fourth single, "Popscene". However, the commercial death of "Popscene" prompted those plans to be abandoned. The studio version of "Never Clever" was eventually released on a promo CD to celebrate Food Records' 100th release in 1997.

The 7-inch vinyl has a cover version of Rod Stewart's "Maggie May", which had been recorded for and was first released on Ruby Trax, a 1992 triple album compilation of cover versions issued by the NME on its 40th birthday. It was also featured on Blur's The Special Collectors Edition in 1994 along with "Es Schmecht".

Professional ratings
Review scores
Source	Rating
AllMusic	3/5 stars

== Release ==
"Chemical World" was released on 28 June 1993 as the second single from Modern Life Is Rubbish, equalling their previous release "For Tomorrow" at number 28 in the UK Singles Charts. In the United States, the song reached number 27 on the Modern Rock Tracks chart, becoming the only single from the album to chart there.

The song was commissioned by Blur's American record label, SBK Records, to increase the album's appeal for the American market. The first version shown to SBK was a demo produced by the band. It was then re-recorded in a version produced by Stephen Street. This version was used for the UK version of the album but SBK preferred the demo which was 'reworked' by producers Clive Langer and Alan Winstanley and used for the US album. Although originally never labelled as such (with only the producer credits on the sleeves and labels showing which version is used), this version is now known as "Chemical World (Reworked)" which is how it appeared since 1999's The 10 Year Limited Edition Anniversary Box Set.

The single cover features a red Ferrari F40 and a mustang against a background of the Brooklyn Bridge and the Manhattan skyline. The music video shows the band in a grassy field surrounded by wildlife. On the 1994 Beavis and Butt-head episode "Generation in Crisis", when the video was reviewed, Beavis (Mike Judge) said that he wanted to urinate all over the band and the wildlife, including a snail and Damon Albarn. "Chemical World" did not appear on the 2000 greatest hits compilation Blur: The Best Of but was included on the 2009 compilation Midlife: A Beginner's Guide to Blur.

== Critical reception ==
Miranda Sawyer from Select wrote, "On Blur's 'Chemical World' (Food), Damon tells the tale of some poor townie lass who takes the bus into the country to get a bit of fresh air and loses her flat as a result."

== Track listings ==
All music was composed by Damon Albarn, Graham Coxon, Alex James and Dave Rowntree. All lyrics were written by Albarn except where noted.

- 7-inch
1. "Chemical World" (radio edit) – 3:54
2. "Maggie May" (Rod Stewart and Martin Quittenton) – 4:05
- 12-inch
1. "Chemical World" (reworked) – 3:46 (uncredited on sleeve that it is the reworked demo version)
2. "Es Schmecht" – 3:38
3. "Young & Lovely" – 5:04
4. "My Ark" – 5:58
- CD1 (live tracks from Glastonbury Festival 1992)
1. "Chemical World" (reworked) (uncredited on sleeve that it is the reworked demo version)
2. "Never Clever" (live) (Blur (music and lyrics))– 2:28
3. "Pressure on Julian" (live) – 5:00
4. "Come Together" (live) – 3:30
- CD2
1. "Chemical World" (radio edit) – 3:54
2. "Young & Lovely" – 5:04
3. "Es Schmecht" – 3:38
4. "My Ark" – 5:58

== Personnel ==
- "Chemical World" and "Young & Lovely" produced by Stephen Street
- "Es Schmecht" produced by Blur
- "My Ark" produced by Blur and John Smith
- "Maggie May" produced by Steve Lovell
- "Chemical World" (Reworked) produced by Blur, Clive Langer and Alan Winstanley

=== Chemical World ===
- Damon Albarn – vocal
- Graham Coxon – electric guitars, acoustic guitars, backing vocal
- Alex James – bass guitar
- Dave Rowntree – drums

=== Intermission ===
- Damon Albarn – piano
- Graham Coxon – electric guitars
- Alex James – bass guitar
- Dave Rowntree – drums

== Charts ==
Chart (1993)	Peak position
Europe (Eurochart Hot 100)	87
UK Singles (Official Charts)	28
UK Airplay (Music Week)	16
US Alternative Airplay (Billboard)	27
