= Bang (Blur song) =

1991 single by Blur

Single by Blur

from the album Leisure
- B-side: "Luminous"; "Explain"; "Uncle Love"; "Berserk"
- Released: 29 July 1991
- Length: 3:36
- Label: Food
- Songwriters: Damon Albarn; Graham Coxon; Alex James; Dave Rowntree
- Producer: Stephen Street

Blur singles chronology
"There's No Other Way" (1991)	"Bang" (1991)	"Popscene" (1992)

Music video
- "Bang" on YouTube

"Bang" is a song by English rock band Blur, released on 29 July 1991 by Food Records as the third single from their debut album, Leisure (1991).

== Music video ==
Screenshot of "Bang" video

The music video for "Bang", directed by Willy Smax, features the band in west London at night. Time-lapse photography of night-time traffic was used, creating streaks of light from cars' headlights. Black-and-white performance shots were also included. In later years Dave Rowntree expressed his love of the video, stating it as his favorite of the Blur catalogue. The video itself went generally unnoticed during its time of release and of all the promos, gets the least airplay on television. The video has been aired quite frequently on MTV Rocks, though, as part of their Blur Top 40 list, of which it features at 26. A vinyl copy of Beatles for Sale by the Beatles, Blonde on Blonde by Bob Dylan, and Forever Changes by Love can be found in the music video when Graham Coxon is seen playing his guitar. The board game the band is playing whilst sat at the table is Scrabble. The music video bears similarity to "Tomorrow Comes Today" by frontman Damon Albarn's later project Gorillaz due to its shots of London and the Centre Point building.

== Release ==
"Bang" reached number 24 in the UK Singles Chart. Its disappointing performance relative to previous single "There's No Other Way" marked the end of Blur's initial period of popularity, which would not be equalled until the release of "Girls & Boys" three years later.

It has been all but disowned by the band, who claim it was written in less than 15 minutes in response to record company demands for another bankable single. It is almost never played live, and has not been included on either Blur: The Best Of or Midlife: A Beginner's Guide to Blur. "I don't think we'll ever play that again", Alex James remarked in 1999, having performed it during rehearsals for that year's tour. "Fuckin' hell, worst verse you ever heard." Dannii Minogue gave it 'Stinker of the Week' in Number One."

== Track listings ==
All songs were written by Blur.

- 7-inch and cassette
1. "Bang" – 3:34
2. "Luminous" – 3:13
- 12-inch
1. "Bang" (extended) – 4:27
2. "Explain" – 2:44
3. "Luminous" – 3:13
4. "Uncle Love" – 2:31
- CD
1. "Bang" – 3:34
2. "Explain" – 2:44
3. "Luminous" – 3:13
4. "Berserk" – 6:52

== Personnel ==
Blur

- Damon Albarn – lead vocals, production on "Luminous", "Berserk" and "Uncle Love"
- Graham Coxon – guitar, backing vocals, production on "Luminous", "Berserk" and "Uncle Love"
- Alex James – bass guitar, production on "Luminous", "Berserk" and "Uncle Love"
- Dave Rowntree – drums, production on "Luminous", "Berserk" and "Uncle Love"

Additional personnel

- Stephen Street – production on "Bang" and "Explain"

== Charts ==
Chart (1991)	Peak position
Australia (ARIA)	189
UK Singles (OCC)	24
UK Airplay (Music Week)	50
US Dance Music/Club Play Singles (Billboard)	40
