= Beetlebum =

1997 single by Blur

Single by Blur

from the album Blur
- B-side: "All Your Life"; "A Spell (For Money)"; "Woodpigeon Song"; "Dancehall"
- Released: 16 January 1997
- Genre: Pop rock; dream pop; indie pop
- Length: 5:05
- Label: Food; Parlophone
- Composers: Damon Albarn; Graham Coxon; Alex James; Dave Rowntree
- Lyricist: Damon Albarn
- Producer: Stephen Street

Blur singles chronology
"Charmless Man" (1996)	"Beetlebum" (1997)	"Song 2" (1997)

Music video
- "Beetlebum" on YouTube

Audio sample
- file; help

"Beetlebum" is a song by English rock band Blur. It was released on 16 January 1997 as the lead single from the band's eponymous fifth album, Blur (1997). Written about Blur frontman Damon Albarn's experiences with heroin, the song features Beatles-influenced music and a mood that Albarn described as "sleepy" and "sexy". Despite fears of the song's uncommercial nature, the single debuted at number one on the UK Singles Chart, becoming Blur's second track to top the chart. It has since appeared on several Blur compilations.

== Background ==
"Beetlebum" was inspired by heroin and the drug experiences Damon Albarn had with his then-girlfriend, Justine Frischmann of Elastica. Albarn reflected, "That whole period of a lot of people's lives was fairly muddied by heroin for a lot of people. And it's sort of, it's in that place. And a lot of stuff was at that time." He has stated in an interview with MTV that the song describes a complicated emotion, sort of "sleepy" and sort of "sexy".

Rolling Stone hypothesises that the song's title is a reference to the phrase "chasing the beetle", further linking the song to Albarn's experimentation with drugs. Albarn commented, "I'm not sure what a Beetlebum is. It's just a word I sang when I played the song to myself. I asked the others if I should change it, but they said no. If it felt right, we decided that we wouldn't tidy it up like we've done in the past. It's about drugs basically." Producer Stephen Street later commented, "I didn't know Beetlebum was about heroin. I thought it was just something he’d made up!" A 2023 article in Dig! points out that "Beetlebaum" is "the name of a horse in comedian Spike Jones’ parody of the William Tell Overture, released as a single in 1948." Also of note, 'Beadlebum' is a name that broadcaster Jeremy Beadle would use when hosting radio shows on London's LBC radio station from 1979-80.

Bassist Alex James explained of the song, "I think 'Beetlebum' is representative of the fact that as the band's got older, the songs have become more simple. Now we can play them with a lot more feeling." Street similarly pointed to the song as a pivotal one for the band, commenting, "Listening back to Damon Albarn’s vocals on 'Beetlebum' for the first time, I had tears in my eyes, thinking: 'This is special'."

The song has been described as a "Beatles tribute" by several publications; Stephen Thomas Erlewine of AllMusic wrote that the song "[ran] through the White Album in the space of five minutes".

== Release ==
Because of its stylistic differences from Blur's previous singles, "Beetlebum" was expected to be a commercial disappointment. As James recalls, "When we first took it around, 'Beetlebum' was perceived as commercial suicide." Despite these fears, "Beetlebum" sold 120,000 copies in the UK during its first week on sale, becoming the band's second number-one single (after "Country House"). The song also reached the top 10 in several European countries as well as number 13 on the Canadian RPM Alternative 30 ranking.

In addition to its release on Blur, the song has appeared on compilations such as Blur: The Best Of and Midlife: A Beginner's Guide to Blur. It was remixed by Moby for the remix album Bustin' + Dronin'.

== Critical reception ==
The song was highlighted as a single of the week in Melody Maker by Everett True, who wrote that it was a "return to the experimentation of their second album", and that it "could be their finest moment yet." Guest reviewer Richard Parfitt was less keen, giving it an "'F' for 'fake'". NME writer Ted Kessler said that it was "strangely antiseptic" and that "you wonder briefly about the dynamics of Damon and Justine's life in their big white house."

== Music video ==
The "Beetlebum" music video was directed by Sophie Muller. The downbeat video combines a performance of the song in a room in a tall building with computer-generated zoom-outs from the set showing the Earth in the centre of kaleidoscopic patterns. Alex James' cigarette and Dave Rowntree's Coke can are censored, although in a version of the video more recently released, both of these items are uncensored. The video concludes with the camera zooming out of the room to show a shot of the River Thames and London's skyline.

== Track listings ==
All music was composed by Damon Albarn, Graham Coxon, Alex James and Dave Rowntree. All lyrics were written by Albarn.

UK CD1

1. "Beetlebum"
2. "All Your Life"
3. "A Spell (For Money)"

UK CD2

1. "Beetlebum"
2. "Beetlebum" (Mario Caldato Jr. mix)
3. "Woodpigeon Song"
4. "Dancehall"

UK limited-edition 7-inch red vinyl single

1. "Beetlebum"
2. "Woodpigeon Song"

Japanese CD single

1. "Beetlebum"
2. "All Your Life"
3. "Woodpigeon Song"
4. "A Spell (For Money)"

== Personnel ==
- Damon Albarn – lead vocals, synthesizers, acoustic guitar
- Graham Coxon – electric guitar, backing vocals
- Alex James – bass guitar
- Dave Rowntree – drums

== Charts ==
=== Weekly charts ===
Chart (1997)	Peak position
Australia (ARIA)	35
Canada Rock/Alternative (RPM)	13
Europe (Eurochart Hot 100)	9
Finland (Suomen virallinen lista)	3
Germany (GfK)	85
Iceland (Íslenski Listinn Topp 40)	2
Ireland (IRMA)	8
Israel (IBA)	18
Italy Airplay (Music & Media)	2
Netherlands (Dutch Top 40 Tipparade)	21
Netherlands (Single Top 100)	87
New Zealand (Recorded Music NZ)	34
Scottish Singles Sales (Official Charts)	1
Spain (AFYVE)	2
Sweden (Sverigetopplistan)	39
UK Singles (Official Charts)	1

=== Year-end charts ===
Chart (1997)	Position
Iceland (Íslenski Listinn Topp 40)	26
UK Singles (OCC)	61

== Certifications ==
Region	Certification	Certified units/sales
United Kingdom (BPI)	Gold	400,000^{‡}
^{‡} Sales+streaming figures based on certification alone.

== Release history ==
Region	Date	Format(s)	Label(s)	Ref.
Japan	16 January 1997	CD	Food; Parlophone	
United Kingdom	20 January 1997	7-inch vinyl; CD	Food; Parlophone	
