= Sunday Sunday =

1993 single by Blur

Single by Blur

from the album Modern Life Is Rubbish
- B-side: "Tell Me, Tell Me"; "Long Legged"; "Mixed Up"; "Dizzy"; "Fried"; "Shimmer"; "Daisy Bell"; "Let's All Go Down the Strand"
- Released: 4 October 1993
- Length: 2:38
- Label: Food
- Composers: Damon Albarn; Graham Coxon; Alex James; Dave Rowntree
- Lyricist: Damon Albarn
- Producers: Steve Lovell; Blur; Graeme Holdaway

Blur singles chronology
"Chemical World" (1993)	"Sunday Sunday" (1993)	"Girls & Boys" (1994)

Music video
- "Sunday Sunday" on YouTube

"Sunday Sunday" is a song by English rock band Blur, included on their second album, Modern Life Is Rubbish (1993). It was released on 4 October 1993 by Food Records as the final single from that album, and charted at number 26 on the UK Singles Chart. This is the highest-charting single from the album (although the lowest-selling single from the album); the record company thought the original album contained no singles, and had the band write the other two singles specifically for single release. The band's original name, 'Seymour', is credited as guest performer on the CD1 single, due to the B-sides being recordings from that era.

The song is a satirical social commentary on traditional British Sunday activities (before the introduction of the Sunday Trading Act 1994, which permitted UK businesses to trade on Sundays). The music video was released in October 1993 and shot in front of Exchange Tower at Millwall Dock in London. It depicts the band members engaging in some of these traditional Sunday activities such as preparing a Sunday roast, a caravan holiday, washing the car and playing with the dog.

The song "Daisy Bell" is a B-side on CD 2. Singer Damon Albarn once mentioned that he would like to make music his grandparents would approve of. Graham Coxon has described the cover versions of "Daisy Bell" and "Let's All Go Down the Strand" as marking "one of the worst moments of Blur's career". CD 2 is subtitled The Sunday Sunday Popular Community Song CD.

== Critical reception ==
Alan Jones from Music Week gave "Sunday Sunday" four out of five, describing it as "a retro-styled track, more direct and spivish than the usual Blur fare. Almost apeing "Lazy Sunday" in style but undeniably commercial, it's likely to prosper, especially as there are eight more tracks spread across the four formats." Andrew Perry from Select wrote, "Blur've handled the tricky second-LP syndrome rather neatly with their 'Baggy Trah-surs' oompah bit. 'Sunday, Sunday' (Food) is probably about brawling at the funfair, what with its barrel-organ and drunken guitar, but lordy, it's so backward-looking."

== B-sides ==
The B-sides on "Sunday Sunday" (Blur featuring Seymour) are previously unreleased tracks by Blur in their early days as Seymour, recorded in 1989. Originally, "Dizzy", "Fried" and "Shimmer" were only available on the CD, with "Tell Me, Tell Me" only available on the 7" and "Long Legged" and "Mixed Up" on the 12". In 1999 these were all compiled onto one disc in the 10 Yr Boxset. The only Seymour song released that wasn't a Blur featuring Seymour "Sunday Sunday" B-side was "Sing (to Me)", an early version of "Sing", which came out as a fan club single in 2000. The songs were not included on the career-spanning Blur 21 box set released in 2012, instead rehearsal demo versions of "Dizzy" and "Mixed Up" were included on Rarities One, which features in the set.

The CD2 single is subtitled as The Sunday Sunday Popular Community Song CD. The songs on the CD are music hall songs "Daisy Bell" and "Let's All Go Down the Strand". A fourth song was recorded, "For Old Times' Sake", but did not make it onto the EP. It is unknown why, but it was possibly deleted (the recording altogether). "Daisy Bell" and "Let's All Go Down the Strand" made it onto the 10 Yr Boxset in 1999 and the Blur 21 box set in 2012.

== Track listings ==
All music was composed by Albarn, Coxon, James and Rowntree except where indicated.

- 7-inch vinyl
1. "Sunday Sunday" (Albarn, Coxon, James, Rowntree; Lyrics by Albarn) – 2:37
2. "Tell Me, Tell Me" (featuring Seymour) – 3:37
- 12-inch vinyl
1. "Sunday Sunday" (Albarn, Coxon, James, Rowntree; Lyrics by Albarn) – 2:37
2. "Long Legged" (featuring Seymour) – 2:23
3. "Mixed Up" (featuring Seymour) – 3:01
- CD1 (Blur featuring Seymour)
1. "Sunday Sunday" (Albarn, Coxon, James, Rowntree; Lyrics by Albarn) – 2:37
2. "Dizzy" (featuring Seymour) – 3:24
3. "Fried" (featuring Seymour) – 2:34
4. "Shimmer" (featuring Seymour) – 4:40
- CD2 (The Popular Community Song CD)
1. "Sunday Sunday" (Albarn, Coxon, James, Rowntree; Lyrics by Albarn) – 2:37
2. "Daisy Bell" (Harry Dacre) – 2:48
3. "Let's All Go Down the Strand" (Murphy, Castling) – 3:42

== Personnel ==
- "Sunday Sunday" was produced by Steve Lovell
- "Daisy Bell" and "Let's All Go Down the Strand" were produced by Blur
- "Dizzy", "Fried", "Shimmer", "Long Legged" and "Mixed Up" were produced by Graeme Holdaway and Blur
- "Tell Me, Tell Me" was produced by Graeme Holdaway

Blur

- Damon Albarn – vocal, bingo organ
- Graham Coxon — electric guitars, acoustic guitars, slide guitar, backing vocal
- Alex James – bass guitar
- Dave Rowntree – drums

The Kick Horns

- Tim Sanders – tenor saxophone
- Roddy Lorimer – trumpet
- Neil Sidwell – trombone
- Simon Clarke – baritone and alto saxophone
- Paul Spong – cornet

== Charts ==
Chart (1993)	Peak position
Europe (Eurochart Hot 100)	83
UK Singles (OCC)	26
UK Airplay (Music Week)	21
