= For Tomorrow (song) =

Single by Blur

from the album Modern Life Is Rubbish
- B-side: "Into Another", "Hanging Over" (12"); "Peach", "Bone Bag" (CD1); "When the Cows Come Home", "Beachcoma", "For Tomorrow (acoustic)" (CD2)
- Released: 19 April 1993
- Genre: Britpop
- Length: 4:18 (album and single version); 6:00 (Visit to Primrose Hill extended version)
- Label: Food
- Composers: Damon Albarn; Graham Coxon; Alex James; Dave Rowntree
- Lyricist: Damon Albarn
- Producer: Stephen Street

Blur singles chronology
"Popscene" (1992)	"For Tomorrow" (1993)	"Chemical World" (1993)

Music video
- "For Tomorrow" on YouTube

"For Tomorrow" is a song by English rock band Blur. It is the lead track to their second album, Modern Life Is Rubbish (1993) (the title appears in the lyric). Released 19 April 1993 by Food Records as the first single from the album, "For Tomorrow" charted at number 28 in the UK Singles Chart. The Visit to Primrose Hill Extended version of "For Tomorrow" was included in the band's compilation albums, Blur: The Best of, (being the only song from Modern Life Is Rubbish to be featured) and Midlife: A Beginner's Guide to Blur. The accompanying music video for the song was directed by Julien Temple.

== Single background ==
In this period the band had gone on a tour of the US which they greatly detested, especially as the country was the home of grunge and audiences were not receptive to their music. After that tour lead singer Damon Albarn started to write songs with a very British feel. This was one such song, written on Christmas Day 1992 at the family piano in his parents' house. David Balfe, the head of the band's record company, commissioned this song as the original album did not have any hit singles.

Like the rest of Modern Life Is Rubbish, the song was produced by Stephen Street, although Jeff Lynne was also considered as a possible producer. The chorus features a la la la refrain, sung by female backing singers, whom Street instructed to sing like Thunderthighs on the classic Mott the Hoople singles. Guitarist Graham Coxon explained that "Everyone, wherever they are in the world knows what la la la means." A string section, The Duke String Quartet, was also used by the band for the first time. The single cover of the two World War II fighter planes was used by the band as a sense of Britishness.

== Release and reception ==
The single was released without a 7" vinyl format, possibly to emphasise the importance of the six-minute-long 'Visit to Primrose Hill extended' version which appears on the 12" vinyl, cassette and CD1. CD2 however did feature the shorter 'single version'. The song charted at number 28 in the UK in its first week of release, a position matched by Blur's next single, "Chemical World". This was the third lowest chart position the band reached in the UK, the previous single "Popscene" had reached number 32 and "She's So High" in 1990 didn't make the Top 40, charting at number 48. The song did not chart in any other countries.

Much like the band's next single "Chemical World", the CD1 contained a big Compac-Plus box for both CD1 and CD2 to go in, but CD2 was sold separately.

== Lyrical themes ==
The lyric of the song is about London, and especially Primrose Hill, a hill in the borough of Camden, North London. From there one can see the whole of central London before them. The complete phrase from the song says "Take a drive to Primrose Hill // It's windy there, and the view's so nice". Part of the promotional video was also filmed at Primrose Hill.

The ending of the song has a line about a man, Jim, entering his house in Emperor's Gate, SW7 (Kensington). When Albarn's parents first moved to London, they lived in a flat next door to The Beatles. In a 2005 interview Damon Albarn stated that he used Emperors' Gate in the lyric because of this (13 Emperors' Gate was the first London-based home for the Lennons; they lived there in 1964). He found it "romantic" that his parents lived right next to these people.

== Increase in stature ==
Like Modern Life Is Rubbish, the album this song appears on, "For Tomorrow" has increased in stature since its release. The song charted at number 15 in a Time Out poll about the best songs about London, the magazine labelled the track as an "indie anthem". In addition, Mojo magazine chose this song in their "50 Greatest British Tracks Ever" list. In a blurtalk.com vote, For Tomorrow was voted fifth out of all of the band's singles, despite being the third lowest charting on its release.

== Music video ==
The music video for "For Tomorrow", directed by British director Julien Temple, was filmed in a classic black and white style and featured Northern Irish actress Kathy Kiera Clarke. The video was shot entirely in London. Some repeated scenes include:

- The band at Trafalgar Square
- Shots of Nelson's Column
- Albarn leaning out of a London bus
- Night scene shot under the Westway, south-west corner of the Sports Centre (Street View)
- The band flying kites atop Primrose Hill
- Albarn floating in the River Thames
- Old lady with black dog in front of 312 Portobello Road. Cafe Bar in the background at 349 Portobello Rd.
- Young and old residents in Golborne Road, lip-syncing the song in front of Trellick Tower

The video ends with Albarn rolling down Primrose Hill with Kathy Kiera Clarke.

On 10 May 2023, marking the 30th anniversary of Modern Life Is Rubbish , a 4K colour version of the video became available on the Blur YouTube channel.

== Track listings ==
All songs were written by Albarn, Coxon, James and Rowntree.

- CD1
1. "For Tomorrow" (Visit to Primrose Hill extended) – 6:00
2. "Peach" – 3:57
3. "Bone Bag" – 4:03
- CD2
1. "For Tomorrow" (single version) – 4:20
2. "When the Cows Come Home" – 3:49
3. "Beachcoma" – 3:37
4. "For Tomorrow" (acoustic version) – 4:41
- 12-inch and cassette
1. "For Tomorrow" (Visit to Primrose Hill extended) – 6:00
2. "Into Another" – 3:54
3. "Hanging Over" – 4:27

== Personnel ==
Personnel taken from Modern Life Is Rubbish CD booklet.

Blur

- Damon Albarn – vocal, Solina organ, sleigh bells
- Graham Coxon – electric guitars, acoustic guitars, backing vocal
- Alex James – bass guitar
- Dave Rowntree – drums, timpani

The Duke String Quartet

- Louise Fuller – violin
- Rick Koster – violin
- John Metcalfe – viola
- Ivan McCready – cello
- with Helen Kamminga – viola

Technical personnel

- Stephen Street – production
- John Smith – engineering

== Charts ==
Chart (1993)	Peak position
Australia (ARIA)	119
UK Singles (OCC)	28
UK Airplay (Music Week)	19
