= Leisure (album) =

Studio album by Blur
- Released: 26 August 1991
- Recorded: May 1990 – March 1991
- Studios: Battery (Willesden, London)
- Genres: Britpop; Madchester; shoegaze; baggy; neo-psychedelia
- Length: 50:16
- Label: Food
- Producers: Steve Lovell; Steve Power; Stephen Street; Mike Thorne; Blur

Blur chronology
Leisure (1991)	Modern Life Is Rubbish (1993)

Singles from Leisure
- 1. "She's So High / I Know" Released: 15 October 1990; 2. "There's No Other Way" Released: 15 April 1991; 3. "Bang" Released: 29 July 1991

Leisure is the debut studio album by English rock band Blur, released on 26 August 1991 by Food Records.

The album draws influences from the Madchester and shoegaze styles popular in the UK indie scene at the time, contrasting with the Britpop sound that the band would later pioneer beginning with follow-up album Modern Life Is Rubbish (1993). It features the band's first three singles, "She's So High", "There's No Other Way", and "Bang", and marks the beginning of Blur's long-running collaboration with producer Stephen Street, who produced the majority of the album's 12 tracks.

Upon its release, Leisure received mixed reviews from critics but was a moderate commercial success, selling over 100,000 copies and earning Gold certification in the UK. While the album has undergone some critical reappraisal in later years, it is most often viewed in comparison to the band's later work.

== Content ==
The original version of "Sing", entitled "Sing (To Me)", was recorded as a demo in late 1989 under the band's former name, Seymour, and can be heard on the ultra-rare promo-only single which was released over a decade later in February 2000 and on the first of a 4-disc set with rare material in the Blur 21 box set.

The cover photograph was taken in May 1954 by Charles Hewitt, for a Picture Post fashion feature on bathing hats, "Glamour in the Swim".

== Release ==
The album was released on 26 August 1991 in the United Kingdom by record label Food. It was released in the US a month later, on 24 September 1991 with a different track listing: this version is frontloaded with Blur's three UK singles, and the song "Sing" was replaced by "I Know", previously an A-side with "She's So High" (see track listings for exact changes). The Canadian version has the same track listing as the UK version.

Leisure peaked at number 7 in the UK Albums Chart. The album was certified Gold in the UK.

As part of the album's 21st anniversary, Leisure was remastered and reissued along with the band's other studio albums on 30 July 2012. The album was reissued a second time to celebrate the album's 25th anniversary, on coloured vinyl, on 26 August 2016.

== Reception and legacy ==
Professional ratings
Review scores
Source	Rating
AllMusic	3/5 stars
Drowned In Sound	8/10
Encyclopedia of Popular Music	3/5 stars
Entertainment Weekly	A−
Pitchfork	5.8/10
Q	4/5 stars
The Rolling Stone Album Guide	2.5/5 stars
Select	5/5
Smash Hits	8/10

Leisure received mixed reviews from the British music press. A highly enthusiastic David Cavanagh wrote in Select magazine that "The four Blur boys have guaranteed themselves a hefty leg-up in the being-taken-seriously stakes with the thrills they've carved into the grooves of Leisure." He concluded that "Leisure, in short, is one of those happy occasions when the hype is dead right." Q magazine's Paul Davies rated the album four out of five stars, and felt it fulfilled the early promise Blur showcased: "This latest bunch of floppy-fringed pop cadets in baggy clothing should consummate their burgeoning pop romance in fine style", Davies elaborated, "for Leisure is a substantially stocked treasure-chest of hit singles just waiting to happen." Alexis Petridis however, stated that "on the evidence of this album, they don't appear to know what they're doing and as a result make appalling mistakes all over the place". He also described the lyrics as "bad".

In a 2007 interview, lead singer Damon Albarn expressed distaste for the album, describing it as "awful" and being one of the two "bad records" he has made in his career (the other being Blur album The Great Escape). Albarn further expanded on the album's recording in 2014, explaining that "it wasn't a particularly happy experience" and suggested the band were too keen to please the record label by capitalising on a sound that was popular at the time. The band rarely played tracks from the album live in later tours, with only the singles "There's No Other Way" and "She's So High" being frequently included in setlists.

"Sing" was included on the Trainspotting soundtrack in 1996. In 2008, Coldplay announced upon the release of Viva la Vida or Death and All His Friends that "Sing" provided a starting point for "Lost!".

== Track listing ==
All tracks are written by Damon Albarn, Graham Coxon, Alex James and Dave Rowntree.

UK Edition
No.	Title	Producer(s)	Length
1.	"She's So High"	Steve Lovell; Steve Power	4:45
2.	"Bang"	Stephen Street	3:36
3.	"Slow Down"	Street	3:11
4.	"Repetition"	Street	5:25
5.	"Bad Day"	Street	4:23
6.	"Sing"	Blur	6:00
7.	"There's No Other Way"	Street	3:23
8.	"Fool"	Mike Thorne	3:15
9.	"Come Together"	Street	3:51
10.	"High Cool"	Street	3:37
11.	"Birthday"	Thorne	3:50
12.	"Wear Me Down"	Thorne	4:49
Total length:			50:13

All tracks are written by Damon Albarn, Graham Coxon, Alex James and Dave Rowntree.

Japanese edition
No.	Title	Producer(s)	Length
1.	"She's So High"	Steve Lovell; Steve Power	4:46
2.	"There's No Other Way"	Stephen Street	3:23
3.	"Bang"	Street	3:37
4.	"I Know"	Lovell; Power	3:32
5.	"Slow Down"	Street	3:11
6.	"Repetition"	Street	5:25
7.	"Bad Day"	Street	4:24
8.	"Sing"	Blur	6:00
9.	"High Cool"	Street	3:38
10.	"Come Together"	Street	3:52
11.	"Inertia"	Blur	3:48
12.	"Mr. Briggs"	Blur	3:59
13.	"Fool"	Mike Thorne	3:16
14.	"Birthday"	Thorne	3:50
15.	"Wear Me Down"	Thorne	4:50
Total length:			61:31

- Note: The US and Japan editions of the album have different track listings.

Leisure – 21st Anniversary deluxe edition bonus disc
No.	Title	Length
13.	"I Know" (extended version)	6:31
14.	"Down"	5:59
15.	"There's No Other Way" (extended version)	3:59
16.	"Inertia"	3:49
17.	"Mr Briggs"	3:59
18.	"I'm All Over"	2:00
19.	"Won't Do It"	3:20
20.	"Day Upon Day" (live)	4:14
21.	"There's No Other Way" (Blur remix)	4:57
22.	"Bang" (extended version)	4:26
23.	"Explain"	2:45
24.	"Luminous"	3:14
25.	"Berserk"	6:43
26.	"Uncle Love"	2:31
27.	"I Love Her" (demo)	3:36
28.	"Close"	3:03
Total length:		65:06

Bonus disc notes

- 13 to 14 from "She's So High" single (October 1990)
- 15 to 21 from "There's No Other Way" single (April 1991)
- 22 to 26 from "Bang" single (July 1991)
- 27 to 28 from fan club singles

== Personnel ==
Blur

- Damon Albarn – lead vocals, keyboards
- Graham Coxon – guitars, backing vocals
- Alex James – bass guitar
- Dave Rowntree – drums, percussion

Technical

- Blur – production on "Sing", "Inertia" and "Mr. Briggs"
- Steve Lovell – production on "She's So High" and "I Know"
- Steve Power – production on "She's So High" and "I Know"
- Mike Thorne – production on "Fool", "Birthday" and "Wear Me Down"
- Stephen Street – production on "There's No Other Way", "Bang", "Slow Down", "Repetition", "Bad Day", "High Cool" and "Come Together"

== Charts and certifications ==
=== Weekly charts ===
Chart (1991–1992)	Peak position
Australian Albums (ARIA)	142
European Albums Chart	78
UK Albums Chart	7

=== Certifications ===
Region	Certification	Certified units/sales
United Kingdom (BPI)	Gold	100,000^{^}
^{^} Shipments figures based on certification alone.
