= There's No Other Way =

1991 single by Blur

Single by Blur

from the album Leisure
- B-side: "Inertia"; "Mr Briggs"; "I'm All Over"
- Released: 15 April 1991
- Genre: Baggy; dance-rock; indie dance
- Length: 3:14 (single version); 3:23 (album version)
- Label: Food
- Songwriters: Damon Albarn; Graham Coxon; Alex James; Dave Rowntree
- Producer: Stephen Street

Blur singles chronology
"She's So High/I Know" (1990)	"There's No Other Way" (1991)	"Bang" (1991)

Music video
- There's No Other Way (UK Version) on YouTube; There's No Other Way (US Version) on YouTube

"There's No Other Way" is a song by English rock band Blur, released on 15 April 1991 as the second single from their debut album Leisure. "There's No Other Way" peaked at number eight on the UK Singles Chart. It was also their first charting song in the US, reaching number 82 on the Billboard Hot 100, and also reached number five on the US Billboard Modern Rock Tracks, becoming one of their biggest hits in the U.S.

== Release and reception ==
The song was the band's first top 10 in the UK, reaching number 8 on the UK Singles Chart. The single was also a minor hit in the US, reaching number 82 on the Billboard Hot 100, and number five on the Billboard Modern Rock Tracks chart.

Alan Jones of Music Week awarded the song his 'Pick of the Week', writing: "Blur are bound to break big with this organ-bleeding, guitar-powered, post-psychedelic delight, a dancefloor and radio-friendly monster in the making." Linda Ryan of the Gavin Report called it a "trippy pop song with breathy vocals set to a groovin' housebeat... It's a perfect '60s meets '90s vibe with an undeniable hook that begs for another play." In Smash Hits, Miranda Sawyer said: "[The] song is fab! Lots of guitars and it sounds like the '60s, with a tune that's so catchy that it was very nearly Single Of The Fortnight."

== Music video ==
There are two music videos for the song, both videos were released in 1991.

=== UK video ===
The UK video for the song was directed by David Balfe, the former keyboardist for The Teardrop Explodes and owner of Blur's label Food Records. The video was produced by Anita Staines through Radar Films.

The video begins with a close-up shot of a worm inching through the grass. A pink ball is dropped next to the worm and a young girl picks it up, throwing it to her identical twin sister nearby. The scene cuts inside the dining room/kitchen of a suburban house, with Albarn and the rest of the band sitting down at a table. A woman, assumed to be the mother (actress Karen Ford) sets out dishes on the table with the help of the girls. Soup and bread rolls are the first course, this is followed by chicken pie, carrot batons, broccoli florets, gravy and new potatoes.

During the first course the family is then joined by a man assumed to be the father, and the whole group digs into the meal. During the meal, Albarn will occasionally stop eating, look up at the camera, and sing along to the lyrics.

After dinner has ended, the mother gets up from the table and retrieves a trifle from a cabinet, which she holds up in front of her face. The camera then gets distorted and jerky, the view filling up with a variety of colorful, loud filters applied to the film. The family looks at the mother with a mixture of apprehension and excitement as the film gets more distorted and layered with effects. As the song ends, the camera cuts back to a clear shot of the worm crawling in the grass again.

=== US video ===
The US video for the song was directed by Matthew Amos, the video consists of the band playing the song in Diana Dors swimming pool at her home in Orchard Manor, with colorful and psychedelic effects shown in the video.

== Legacy ==
A playable version of the song is available for the Rock Band video game series, and it is available to download for Guitar Hero 5. Kurt Cobain of Nirvana told NME that "There's No Other Way" was his favourite British song of 1991. The song was also featured in Edgar Wright's 2013 film The World's End.

== Track listings ==
All songs were written by Blur.

7-inch and cassette

1. "There's No Other Way" – 3:14
2. "Inertia"

12-inch

1. "There's No Other Way" (extended version) – 4:04
2. "Inertia" – 3:51
3. "Mr Briggs" – 3:59
4. "I'm All Over" – 2:00

CD

1. "There's No Other Way" – 3:14
2. "Inertia" – 3:51
3. "Mr Briggs" – 3:59
4. "I'm All Over" – 2:00

Remix 12-inch

1. "There's No Other Way" (Blur remix) – 5:09
2. "Won't Do It" – 3:19
3. "Day Upon Day" (live) – 4:02

== Credits ==
Blur

- Damon Albarn – lead vocals, organ, production on "Inertia", "Mr Briggs", "I'm All Over" and "Won't Do It"
- Graham Coxon – guitar, backing vocals, production on "Inertia", "Mr Briggs", "I'm All Over" and "Won't Do It"
- Alex James – bass guitar, production on "Inertia", "Mr Briggs", "I'm All Over" and "Won't Do It"
- Dave Rowntree – drums, production on "Inertia", "Mr Briggs", "I'm All Over" and "Won't Do It"

Additional personnel

- Stephen Street – production on "There's No Other Way"

== Charts ==
Chart performance for "There's No Other Way"
Chart (1991–92)	Peak position
Australia (ARIA)	113
Israel (IBA)	20
Luxembourg (Radio Luxembourg)	5
UK Singles (OCC)	8
UK Airplay (Music Week)	25
US Billboard Hot 100	82
US Alternative Airplay (Billboard)	5
US Dance Club Songs (Billboard)	15
US Cash Box Top 100	61

== Certifications ==
Region	Certification	Certified units/sales
United Kingdom (BPI)	Silver	200,000^{‡}
^{‡} Sales+streaming figures based on certification alone.
