= Popscene =

1992 single by Blur

Single by Blur
- B-side: "Mace"; "I'm Fine"; "Garden Central"; "Badgeman Brown"
- Released: 30 March 1992
- Genre: Britpop; pop-punk; post-punk
- Length: 3:15
- Label: Food
- Songwriters: Damon Albarn; Graham Coxon; Alex James; Dave Rowntree
- Producer: Steve Lovell

Blur singles chronology
"Bang" (1991)	"Popscene" (1992)	"For Tomorrow" (1993)

Music video
- "Popscene" on YouTube

"Popscene" is a song by English rock band Blur, released as a non-album single on 30 March 1992. Despite its relatively low chart placing, it has since become critically praised and regarded as one of the pioneering songs of the Britpop genre.

== Recording ==
The song was first played live in late 1991, and recorded at Matrix Studios in Holborn with producer Steve Lovell. The lyrics showed frontman Damon Albarn's distaste for the music business, complaining that there were too many insignificant indie bands.

Musically, it was different to the style seen on the group's first album Leisure and featured heavily flanged guitars, a Can influenced drumbeat, and brass from session players the Kick Horns. The band considered "Popscene" to be the loudest and best thing they had worked on at that point.

== Reception ==
The single reached No. 32 on the UK Singles Chart, and was panned by both Melody Maker and NME. The Beastie Boys, guest reviewing for NME, suggested the record would sound better played at 33 rpm instead of 45. The low chart placing came as a confidence blow for the band, who were £60,000 in debt. Food Records boss Andy Ross later said "we were totally devastated ... we thought it was a brilliant single." The band have since said that the popularity of American grunge music contributed to the single's failure, as they felt the song had a very British feel. Guitarist Graham Coxon said "It was Nirvana that really fucked 'Popscene' up."

Sylvia Patterson from Smash Hits rated the song two out of five. She wrote: "[The song] starts off like the Inspiral Carpets in a car crash and ends up exactly like Mancunian punk-poppers from yesteryear The Buzzcocks. A bizarre commotion from hell. Not very good either."

The experience of recording "Popscene" led the band to believe they should simply play music in their own style and not worry about trends. The "Britishness" of "Popscene" carried over to the group's second album, Modern Life Is Rubbish. The song was not released on the British version of the album, though it was added as an extra track in the United States and Japan. In Australia, "Popscene" was not released until 1998, when it was issued as a double A-side with "On Your Own"; it reached No. 69 on the ARIA Singles Chart.

The song has since become a fan favourite and is still performed live. Retrospective critical reaction to "Popscene" has been positive. Jonathan Holden, writing in the Rough Guide To Rock, declared the single to be "excellent" and that its "punky, energetic and brass-fulfilled pop" was out of place in 1992. John Harris considers the track as one of the first ever Britpop songs, and a starting point for the movement. The song had never been included on a UK Blur album, until 2009 when it was released on the compilation Midlife: A Beginner's Guide to Blur.

== Track listings ==
All songs were written by Albarn, Coxon, James and Rowntree.

7-inch and cassette

1. "Popscene" – 3:12
2. "Mace" – 3:24

12-inch

1. "Popscene" – 3:12
2. "I'm Fine" – 3:01
3. "Mace" – 3:24
4. "Garden Central" – 5:58

CD

1. "Popscene" – 3:12
2. "Mace" – 3:24
3. "Badgeman Brown" – 4:47

== Production credits ==
- "Popscene" produced by Steve Lovell
- "Mace", "Badgeman Brown", and "Garden Central" produced by Blur and John Smith
- "I'm Fine" produced by Blur
- Damon Albarn: lead vocals, synthesizers
- Graham Coxon: guitars, backing vocals
- Alex James: bass guitar
- Dave Rowntree: drums
- The Kick Horns: brass

== Charts ==
Chart (1992)	Peak position
UK Singles (Official Charts)	32

Chart (1998)	Peak position
Australia (ARIA) with "On Your Own"	69

== Bibliography ==
- Harris, John (2003). The Last Party: Britpop, Blair and the Demise of English Rock. Fourth Estate. ISBN 978-0-007-13472-4.
- Holden, Jonathan (2003). The Rough Guide to Rock. Rough Guides. ISBN 978-1-843-53105-0.
- Power, Martin (2013). The Life of Blur. Music Sales Group. ISBN 978-0-857-12862-1.
