= List of former English Heritage blue plaques =

This is a list of the blue plaques placed by English Heritage and its predecessors in the boroughs of London, the City of Westminster, and the City of London that are known to have been lost, replaced, or otherwise removed from the official London-wide commemorative plaque scheme. In some cases plaques have been recovered and preserved and, in a few cases, re-erected with or without the blessing of those administrating the scheme.

The scheme began in 1866. It was initially administered by the Society of Arts which referred to the plaques erected under its auspices as 'Memorial Tablets' (sometimes 'Memorial Tablets of Great Men And Events' or 'Memorial Tablets of Eminent Men'). This arrangement continued until December 1901 when, by agreement and with the encouragement of the Clerk to the Council Laurence Gomme, the scheme was taken over the London County Council which christened it 'Indication of Houses of Historical Interest in London'. The LCC ran the scheme until the County of London was abolished in 1965 when its successor body the Greater London Council (GLC) took charge and expanded the scheme into the newly created outer boroughs. With the abolition of the GLC in 1986, administration of the official London-wide blue plaque scheme passed to English Heritage.

During the first 150 years of the scheme's operation, it was estimated that just over 100 houses bearing plaques had been demolished including 12 destroyed in the 1939-1945 war. The rules for the scheme, established by the Society of Arts in the early years of its operation, adopted and expanded on by the LCC in 1903 and formalised in 1954, require that plaques may generally only be affixed to a surviving building with a close association to the person commemorated. A practice whereby plaques would sometimes be re-erected at rebuilt properties with an explanatory supplementary tablet ceased in 1938. The post-1954 'authenticity rule' was relaxed on occasion by the LCC and GLC, but in the English Heritage era this has not been the case. If, after the loss of a commemorated building and retrieval of the plaque an appropriate alternative London address cannot be identified, the plaque cannot be reaffixed to the new building or remain part of the scheme. Houses bearing plaques to Captain Oates, Edward Lear and Hugh Dowding have been retrieved and placed in storage in recent years, there being no surviving alternative London address for any of these, whereas it has been possible for English Heritage to authentically re-site the plaque to Lilian Lindsay after the house to which it had originally been affixed was knocked down, an alternative residence having been identified. (Note: On the odd occasion that a scheme plaque that had been affixed or re-affixed to an inauthentic address by one of English Heritage's predecessors has been removed as the result of subsequent redevelopment and then reattached, English Heritage have allowed the plaque to remain in the scheme after this rebuilding. For example, the plaques to Dame Marie tempest and Sir Charles Wheatstone, affixed by the Greater London Council to 24 Park Crescent in 1972 and 1981 respectively, remain part of the scheme following their reinstallation in the early 2020s after the complete demolition and rebuilding of the western arm of Park Crescent, because the building to which they had originally been affixed was itself a modern rebuild – a facsimile of John Nash's early c19th terrace constructed in the 1960s. The buildings to which the plaques were originally attached were no more 'authentic' than the replacements.)

== Indication of houses of historical interest in London ==
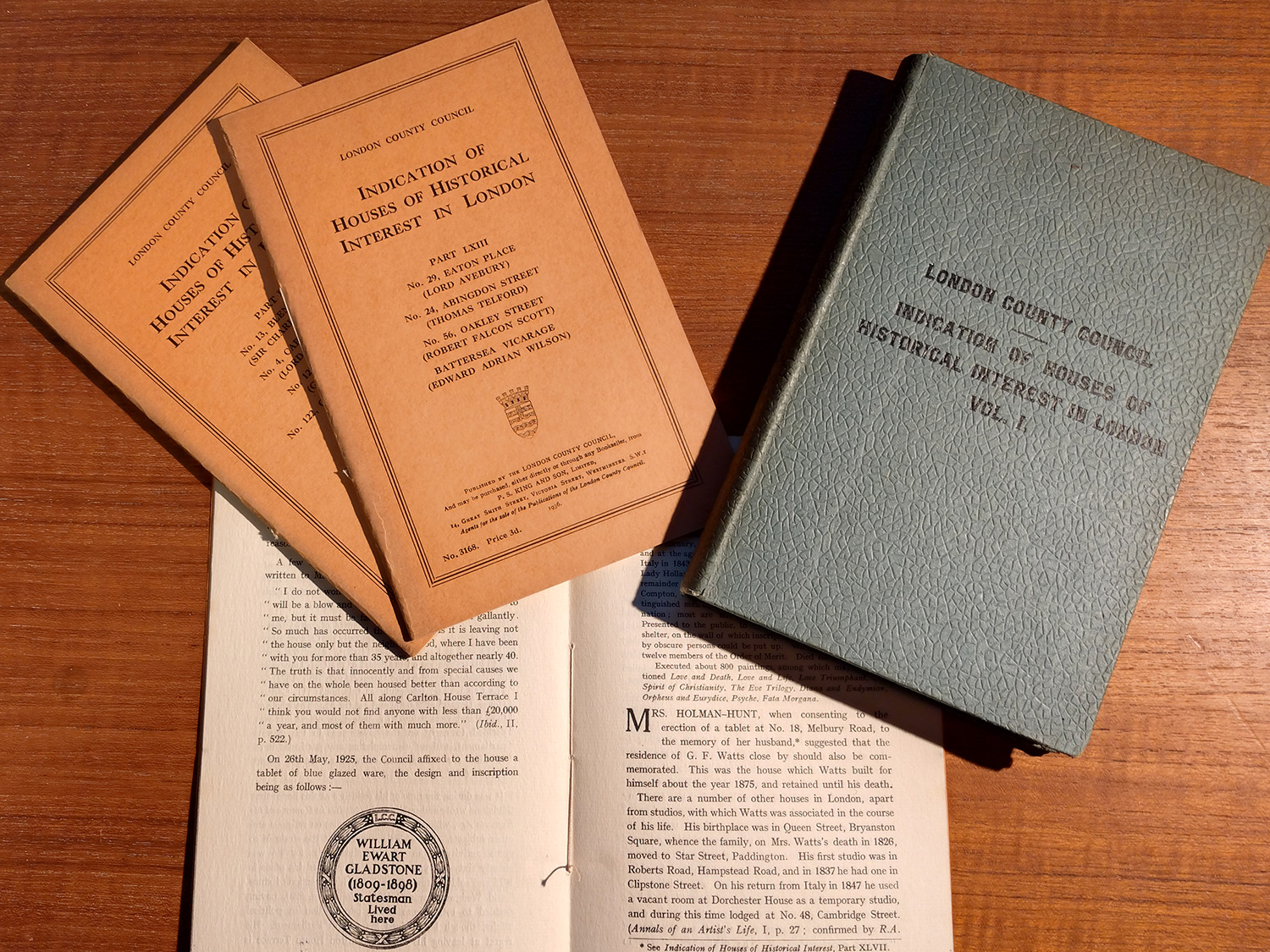
Examples of the London County Council's 'Indication of Houses of Historical Interest in London' series of publications

During the period 1867–1902, the Society of Arts recorded the basic details of the 'memorial tablets' erected under its auspices in the periodical The Journal of the Society of Arts. After taking over the scheme, the London County Council issued a series of booklets detailing the work it was undertaking, each entitled 'Indication of Houses of Historical Interest in London' with a Roman numeral to indicate the order of publication. Each of these recorded the particulars of three or four recently erected plaques and included a short biography of each individual commemorated, details of the connection between person and property, and a simple line drawing of each plaque. Approximately 80 of these were published between 1903 and 1936. The booklets were also compiled and published as six hard bound volumes, issued in 1907, 1909, 1912, 1923, 1930 and 1938 (an expanded second edition of first volume was published in 1915). These were followed by a 'New Series' of 4-page leaflets covering one plaque each; these were entitled 'London Houses of Historical Interest marked by memorial tablets'. covering plaques erected between 1937 and 1940, incorporating photographs or illustrations of the subjects and houses instead of the plaque drawings. Curiously, whilst later sources make reference to eight of these, there are ten in the LCC material held by The London Archives, Nos.1 and 7 being used twice.

The material published by the LCC before 1948 seldom made reference to the plaques erected by its predecessor, the Society of Arts. The first five bound volumes included appendices in which plaques erected by 'persons or authorities other than the London County Council' were listed, these containing brief details of the SOA plaques extant at the time of their publication. The lists in volumes II and II were continuations of the first, the lists in IV and V being as complete as possible at the time of publication. Only the plaque to Sarah Siddons, erected by the Society in 1876 was given its own illustrated 'chapter', this being due to it having been rehung along with a new supplementary tablet provided by the LCC in 1905; a drawing of these appears in the eighth booklet published, subsequently reproduced in the first of the bound volumes.

Publication of new 'Indication of houses of historical interest in London' leaflets ceased after the 1939–1945 war; simplified plaque lists entitled 'List of Houses of Historical Interest in London Marked by Memorial Tablets', now incorporating the surviving SOA plaques under the heading 'Tablets erected by the Royal Society of Arts and other bodies and now maintained by the council' were published by the LCC in April 1947 and March 1949, with losses due to enemy action and other factors indicated. Two more booklets listing the plaques in the scheme, 'Commemorative Tablets on Houses of Historical Interest' were published by the Council, the first in 1952 and a revised version in 1960. The Greater London Council published their 'Blue Plaques on Houses of Historical Interest in London' in 1971, and released an expanded version, featuring a pull-out map indicating the locations of the 365 plaques then in existence, in 1976.

Official publications from the English Heritage era include the coffee-table sized Lived In London: blue plaques and the stories behind them by Emily Cole, published in association with English Heritage in 2009, and The English Heritage Guide to Blue Plaques by the scheme's senior historian, Howard Spencer, first published in 2016, a revised and updated second edition appearing in 2019.

To date, no definitive list of plaques lost to the official London scheme has been published. Identifying them is a matter of reconciling historic sources to the list of plaques maintained by English Heritage. In many cases, the fate of the building to which a lost plaque was affixed can be determined via the pages of the Survey of London.

== Plaques lost ==
This section records plaques removed from the official London Blue Plaque Scheme after the demolition of the building to which they were affixed.

Subject	Inscription	Location	Year installed	Year removed	Photo	Open Plaques ref	Notes
Robert Adam 1728–1792 James Adam D.1794	"Architects Lived Here"	4 Adelphi Terrace; Adelphi	1914	1936			The London County Council erected a terracotta encaustic ware plaque to the architects Robert and James Adam at No.4 Adelphi Terrace on 29 September 1914. Adelphi Terrace was demolished in the 1930s. The brothers Adam are among the figures associated with Adelphi Terrace commemorated by an inscription into the stonework of a 1930s pier on the site made by the LCC in November 1951. Additionally, Robert Adam is one of the figures commemorated by a rectangular LCC plaque of 1950 at 1–3 Robert Street.
Thomas Rhodes Armitage 1824–1890	"Friend of the Blind Lived here"	33 Cambridge Square; Hyde Park W2	1935	1962			The London County Council erected a blue glazed ware plaque to Thomas Rhodes Armitage, founder of the Royal National Institute of Blind People, at 33 Cambridge Square, Hyde Park on 20 February 1935. The Hyde Park estate of which Cambridge Square forms a part was extensively redeveloped by the landowner, the Church Estate, to the plans of Anthony Minoprio starting in 1957 and completing around 1962. All of the early 19th-century houses in Cambridge Square were demolished.
Francis Baily 1774–1844	Not yet determined	37 Tavistock Place; St Pancras	1949	1952			A plaque to the stockbroker and physicist Francis Baily was erected by the London County Council at what was believed to have been his house – 37 Tavistock Place – in 1949. In 1952 the LCC were informed by the Survey of London that the plaque had been placed on the wrong house – the houses formerly in Compton Street had been added to Tavistock Place, and the revised street had been renumbered in 1938. What had been No.37 had been demolished, the Mary Ward Settlement (originally the Passmore Edwards Settlement) occupying the site from 1898.The plaque was removed by the LCC in 1952. The early 19th century building to which it had briefly been affixed still stands.
James Barry 1741–1806	Not yet determined	36 Castle Street; Fitzrovia W1W 8DP	1881	1925			The Society of Arts erected a plaque to the painter James Barry at 36 Castle Street (now Eastcastle Street), Fitzrovia in May 1881. The house was demolished c1925. Westminster City Council have affixed a green plaque commemorating Barry to the building that now occupies the site.
William Blake 1757–1827	"Poet and Painter Lived Here"	28 Broad Street; Soho W1F 8JB	1907	1963			The London County Council erected a blue encaustic ware plaque to the poet and painter William Blake at No.28 Broad Street, Golden Square (subsequently 74 Broadwick Street), Soho on 16 October 1907. The house was demolished in 1963 and a block of flats – William Blake House – erected in its place. A privately erected marker recording the location of Blake's former residence was affixed to a wall in Marshall Street. Blake is commemorated jointly with the painter John Linnell by the scheme with an unusual oval fibreglass plaque at Old Wyldes', North End, Hampstead, this having been erected by the Greater London Council in 1975.
James Boswell 1740–1795	"Biographer of Samuel Johnson Lived Here"	56 Great Queen Street; Covent Garden WC2B 5AZ	1905	1915			The London County Council erected a blue encaustic ware plaque to Boswell at No.56 Great Queen Street on 18 September 1905. The house was demolished in February 1915. The Freemasons' Hall constructed between 1927 and 1933 now completely covers the site. Boswell was subsequently commemorated by the scheme at two other locations – by the London County Council at 122 Great Portland Street, Fitzrovia in 1936 and jointly with Thomas Davies and Dr. Samuel Johnson at 8 Russell Street, Covent Garden by the Greater London Council in 1984.
Charles Bradlaugh 1833–1891	"Advocate of free thought lived here 1870–1877"	29 Turner Street, Stepney; Tower Hamlets	1961	1978			The London County Council put up a blue plaque to commemorate the former residence of Charles Bradlaugh, Member of Parliament and founder of the National Secular Society at 29 Turner Street, Stepney in 1961, the memorial being unveiled by Tony Benn at a ceremony organised by The Ethical Society which took place on 8 November of that year. Bradlaugh was first considered for a plaque by the LCC in 1908, but the owner of the house – 20 Circus Road, St. John's Wood – refused consent. The matter was raised again in 1939 but the 1939–45 war intervened and the Circus Road property was afterwards demolished as a result of bomb damage. A further proposal made in 1947 came to nothing; two houses were considered – 92 (formerly 15) Warner Place, Hackney and 29 Turner Street, Stepney, but the only evidence for these came from a single source which could not, at the time, be corroborated. It was only when further evidence of Bradlaugh's time at Turner Street came to light in 1960 (provided by Mr. Frederick Henry Amphlett Micklewright, the founder and first Chairman of the Upper Norwood and District Preservation Society, later renamed The Norwood Society) that a plaque was authorised. The modest house, where Bradlaugh rented two small rooms from 1870 to 1877, was demolished in the late 1970s. a housing block (19–25 Turner Street) being constructed on the site. The plaque was retrieved by the Greater London Council and is believed to have survived, although owing to the use of the dates of residence in the inscription it cannot be rehung should an alternative surviving London residence for Bradlaugh ever be identified. Bradlaugh was a close associate of Annie Beasant and spoke in favour of the Matchgirls' strike, a notable figure and an event both commemorated with blue plaques erected by the official London scheme; Besant by the LCC in 1963 and the Matchgirls' strike by English Heritage in 2022.
Robert Browning 1812–1889	"Poet, Lived Here 1861–1887. Born 1812. died 1889."	19 Warwick Crescent; Maida Vale W2 6NE	1890	1960			In 1890 the Society of Arts erected a plaque of terracotta encaustic ware at 19 Warwick Crescent, Maida Vale to commemorate the poet Robert Browning who had lived there from 1861 until the summer of 1887, and who had died just a few months previously. This area of London fell into decline in the early 20th century and by the mid-1950s was among the worst slums in London. Warwick Crescent was entirely cleared of properties by the council in the 1960s and new residences, to the design of the GLC's architect Hubert Bennett, constructed in their place. The fortunes of the area subsequently improved; it is now part of the Little Venice ward of the City of Westminster, one of the more affluent areas of the city. 19 Warwick Crescent itself was demolished in 1960. The plaque was retrieved prior to demolition and placed into storage by the London County Council but, in view of its unsuitability for re-use (owing to the dates of residence forming part of the inscription) the LCC accepted a request from 'a collector of Browningiana' to procure it in April 1961. The subsequent fate of the plaque has not been determined. Westminster City Council affixed a green plaque commemorating Browning on a building close to the site of 19 Warwick Crescent on 11th December 1993.
Francis Trevelyan Buckland 1828–1880	"Naturalist lived and died here"	37 Albany Street; St. Pancras NW1	1949	1961			in 1949 the London County Council erected a plaque to the surgeon, zoologist, author and natural historian Francis Trevelyan Buckland at No.37 (formerly No.34) Albany Street, where he lived and kept a menagerie from 1865 until his death at the age of 54 in 1880. The house was demolished in 1961 as part of work to make way for Denys Lasdun's Grade I listed building for the Royal College of Physicians, which was completed in 1964.
Edward Bulwer Lytton 1803–1873	"Novelist Born Here"	31 Baker Street; Marylebone W1U 8EJ	1907	Not yet determined			The London County Council erected a blue encaustic ware plaque at No.31 Baker Street, Portman Square, the birthplace of Lord Lytton, on 9 August 1906. The house was subsequently renumbered No.68. The LCC photographic library index card held by the London Archives is annotated with a note stating that the plaque was removed by the owner or occupier, but does not say when this occurred. Comparison of an image of 31/68 Baker Street with the plaque in situ held by the London Picture Archive with Google StreetView imagery suggests the building has been rebuilt or refronted in keeping with the original structure.
Lord Byron 1788–1824	Not yet determined	24 Holles Street; Marylebone W1G 0DB	1867	1889			The first plaque placed by the official London-wide plaque scheme was erected by the Society of Arts at a house, rebuilt in 1852, on the site of Lord Byron's supposed birthplace in Holles Street. This was blue encaustic ware, manufactured by Minton Hollins & Co. Plaques in the colour blue proved difficult to produce and, after the first four, the majority of the SOAs plaques would be terracotta. 24 Holles Street was lost to demolition in 1889. No evidence supporting Lord Byron's residency at a particular house number in Holles Street has been found and it is likely that neither the SOA plaque nor the three subsequent plaques placed by other organisations on roughly the same site actually marked his birthplace.
Lord Byron 1788–1824	"Poet Lived here"	4 Bennet Street; St James's	1925	1935–1945			On 22 June 1925 the London County Council erected a glazed ware plaque to commemorate Lord Byron at 4 Bennet Street, St James's, where he had taken lodgings in 1813. This was one of a run of seven plaques made for the LCC between 1925 and 1926 by Doulton in the ‘Della Robbia’ style, featuring a colourful raised wreath surround, five of which survive as part of the scheme. The plaque is believed to have been lost during the 1939–45 war.
Sir Colin Campbell Baron Clyde 1792–1863	"Commander-in-Chief during the Indian Mutiny lived here"	10 Berkeley Square; Mayfair W1	1920	1937			The London County Council decided in 1908 to erect a memorial to Colin Campbell, 1st Baron Clyde, at 10 Berkeley Square but changes of ownership and the 1914–1918 war delayed matters until 8 November 1920. The stone tablet was intentionally similar in design to a pre-existing plaque commemorating Horace Walpole at the adjacent No.11 (the Walpole plaque had nothing to do with the LCC or the London plaque scheme, having been erected privately by Mr Vernon Watney, chairman of Watney Combe & Reid.) The houses, on the east side of the square and dating to the 1730s, were among 20 torn down to make way for modern shops and offices in 1937.
George Canning 1770–1827	Not yet determined	37 Conduit Street; Mayfair W1S 2YF	1876	Not yet determined			In the summer of 1876 the Society of Arts erected a plaque to the statesman George Canning at 37 Conduit Street, Mayfair, where he had resided during his time in the Addington ministry (1801 to 1804). 37 Conduit Street was lost during the 1939–1945 war (the London County Council's hand coloured bomb map has the house and others nearby in purple indicating that they were damaged beyond repair). A Hotel – The Westbury, opened in 1955, occupies the site today. Canning was later commemorated by the scheme at 50 Berkeley Square, the Greater London Council erecting a standard blue roundel there in 1979.
Joseph Chamberlain 1836–1914	"Lived here for 31 years"	40 Princes Gardens; South Kensington SW7	1916	1959			Shortly after his death on 22 July 1914 the London County Council – on 23 March 1915 – decided to adorn no fewer than three houses in the County of London associated to the statesman Joseph Chamberlain with commemorative tablets. The first and third of these, a bronze 'medallion' style tablet at 23 Highbury Place erected on 28 July 1915 and a Hopton Stone tablet at 188 Camberwell Grove, erected after some delay on 21 December 1920, survive. The second, another 'medallion' style bronze, was erected on 14 January 1916 at No.40 Princes Gardens where Chamberlain had lived for over 30 years. In 1956 the adjacent Imperial College of Science and Technology, needing to expand, acquired Princes Gardens for redevelopment. The Falmouth and Keogh Hall of University College London, which came into use in 1963, now occupies the site.
John Constable 1776–1837	"Painter Died Here"	76 Charlotte Street; Fitzrovia W1T 4QS	1906	1966			The London County Council erected a memorial tablet of blue encaustic ware at Constable's former residence, 76 Charlotte Street, Fitzrovia, on 6 March 1906. The plaque was lost to redevelopment 60 years later. Constable was commemorated by the LCC a second time at 40 Well Walk, Hampstead in 1923. The Hampstead plaque, the first to be manufactured by Royal Doulton after the change from encaustic ware to the better wearing and comparatively inexpensive 'glazed ware', survives.
Charles Darwin 1809–1882	"Lived Here 1839–1842"	110 Gower Street; Bloomsbury WC1E 6AR	1906	1941			The London County Council erected a blue encaustic ware plaque at Darwin's former Gower Street residence on 26 February 1906. In 1941 the house was badly damaged by fire caused by enemy action, collapsing overnight 16–17 April. A new plaque to Darwin, indirectly replacing the first and commemorating his residence 'in a house on this site' was erected at the Biological Science Building, University College London, in 1961.
Thomas De Quincey 1785–1859	"Man of Letters Lived Here"	61 Greek Street; Soho W1D 3QR	1909	c1937			The London County Council erected a blue encaustic ware plaque to the writer Thomas De Quincey at 61 Greek Street, Soho on 28 October 1909, permission to install one at the preferred address, No.36 Tavistock Street, having been refused. This house was demolished c1937. De Quincey would be commemorated by the scheme a second time in 1981, when the Greater London Council erected a blue roundel recording his connection to 36 Tavistock Street, Covent Garden, permission having now been given. This plaque is notorious for the misspelling of De Quincey's surname as De Quincy.
John Thadeus Delane 1817–1879	"Editor of The Times from 1841 to 1877 Lived Here"	16 Serjeants' Inn; Temple EC4	1910	1939–1945			The London County Council erected a blue encaustic ware plaque to the newspaper editor John Thadeus Delane at No.16, Serjeants' Inn, Temple on 20 April 1910. The plaque was lost during the 1939–1945 war. The site of Serjeants' Inn, Fleet Street, was redeveloped after the destruction of buildings in the vicinity by enemy action during The Blitz.
Charles Dibdin 1745–1814	"Song Writer Lived Here"	34 Arlington Road; Camden Town NW1 7HU	1908	1939–1945			The London County Council erected a blue encaustic ware plaque to the songwriter Charles Dibdin at 34 Arlington Road, Camden Town on 10 September 1908. The plaque was lost in the 1939–1945 war.
Charles Dickens 1812–1870	"Novelist lived here"	1 Devonshire Terrace; Marylebone W2 3DR	1904	1958			A blue encaustic ware plaque was erected by London County Council at 1 Devonshire Terrace, near Hyde Park on 10 August 1904, the house that Dickens had moved to in 1839 and lived in until 1851. The plaque was identical to that erected by the LCC the year before at Dickens' previous residence, 48 Doughty Street. In spite of the Dickens connection (and questions raised in parliament), the house was demolished to make way for an office block (Ferguson House, 15 Marylebone Road). The present site is marked by a large relief, depicting Dickens and some of the characters he created, by the sculptor Estcourt James Clack.
William Friese-Greene 1855–1921	"Pioneer of cinematography lived here"	136 Maida Vale; Paddington W9 1QB	1954	1997		53456	The London County Council erected a plaque of blue glazed ware to commemorate the former residence of the pioneering cinematographer William Friese-Greene at 136 Maida Vale in 1954. The house was demolished in 1997 despite local opposition. The plaque was retrieved by English Heritage but, there being no alternative London residence for Friese-Green, could not be re-hung elsewhere
Henri Gaudier-Brzeska 1891-1915	"Sculptor and Artist worked here"	454 Fulham Road; Fulham SW6 1BY	1977	c1999			The Greater London Council erected a blue plaque to the French artist and sculptor Henri Gaudier-Brzeska at 454 Fulham Road in 1977. The entire group of buildings was demolished to make way for the Fulham Broadway development, the plaque being recovered by English Heritage who initially planned to re-site it. This did not come to pass, Gaudier-Brzeska being commemorated with a new plaque at 25 Winthorpe Road, Putney in 2017.
Edward Gibbon 1737-1792	Not yet determined	7 Bentinck Street; Marylebone W1U 2EH	1896	1909			A plaque had been erected the house where Gibbon wrote much of The History of the Decline and Fall of the Roman Empire by the Society of Arts in 1896 but it was removed when that former residence was demolished thirteen years later. A new plaque was considered in 1925, proposed again in 1949 and, after some debate and considerable delay caused by an intransigent owner, a replacement affixed to the new building by the LCC in 1964. This was a rare late instance of the 'authenticity rule' being waived – the new plaque stating that Gibbon, having no connection to the property, 'lived in a house on this site'.
Sir John Herschel 1792-1871	"Astronomer Lived Here"	56 Devonshire Street; Marylebone W1G	1904	1933			The London County Council erected a chocolate brown encaustic ware plaque to the astronomer Sir John Herschel at No.56 Devonshire Street, Portman Square on 29 July 1904. The house was subsequently demolished.
William Hogarth 1697–1764	Not yet determined	30 Leicester Square; Leicester Square WC2H 7LA	1881	1935–1945			The Society of Arts erected a memorial tablet to the painter, engraver, satirist, cartoonist and writer William Hogarth at Archbishop Tenison's School, Leicester Square in May 1881. Hogarth lived, and died in a townhouse on this site, which after his death became part of the Sabloniere Hotel The house, in the south-east corner of the square, was demolished in 1869 to make way for new buildings for Tenison's School, which had been displaced from its former location (in the 'new' churchyard of St Martin-in-the-Fields) by an extension to the National Gallery. Tennison's school moved to Kennington Oval in 1928; it closed due to falling admissions in 2023. Hogarth's plaque was removed after the former school building suffered bomb damage in the 1939–1945 war. The site was subsequently cleared and is now occupied by 29–30 Leicester Square, a seven storey office block completed in 1953.
Thomas Hood 1799–1845	"Poet Here wrote the Song of the Shirt"	Devonshire Lodge, 17 Elm Tree Road; St. John's Wood NW8 9JX	1908	1936			The London County Council erected a blue encaustic ware plaque to the poet Thomas Hood at No.17 Elm Tree Road, St. John's Wood on 11th September 1908. The house, later renumbered as No.20 Elm Tree Road, no longer exists – it was demolished in 1936 and a purpose built block of flats named 'Elm Tree Court' now occupies the site. Hood was commemorated by the scheme a second time, a Hopton Wood Stone tablet being erected at 28 Finchley Road, St. Johns Wood in 1912, the LCC – having erected the Elm Tree Road plaque on the basis that this house no longer stood, only to discover in 1911 that it did – wishing to place a memorial at a more prominent location. This plaque survives, but has been illegible since the 1960s. It was joined by a standard blue English Heritage roundel in 2001.
Thomas Henry Huxley 1825–1895	"Biologist Lived Here 1841"	88 Paradise Street; Rotherhithe	1912	1936			The London County Council, having already commemorated Thomas Huxley at No.4 Marlborough Place, St. John's Wood in 1910, decided in the same year to place an almost identical blue encaustic ware tablet at another of his former London residences, No.88 Paradise Street, Rotherhithe (prior to renumbering in 1873, one of two No.58s in Paradise Street) where he had worked as an assistant to a Dr. Chandler in 1841. Difficulties in manufacturing the plaque delayed its installation and it was not affixed until 11th March 1912. The house no longer stands, being demolished to make way for tenement housing in 1936. The Pynfolds Estate, constructed 1953-4, now occupies the site. The St. Johns Wood house and plaque survive.
Edward Jenner 1749–1823	"Originator of Vaccination Lived Here"	14 Hertford Street; Mayfair W1J 7RP	1905	1939–45			The London County Council erected a green encaustic ware plaque to the originator of vaccination, Edward Jenner, at No.14 Hertford Street, Mayfair on 9 August 1905. The house was destroyed during the 1939–1945 war.
Charles Samuel Keene 1823–1891	"Caricaturist Lived Here"	112 Hammersmith Road; Hammersmith W6	1930	1937			A tablet of blue glazed ware was erected to commemorate the former residence of Charles Samuel Keene at 112 Hammersmith Road by the London County Council on 17 November 1930. The building was demolished to make way for the expansion of the J. Lyons & Co. Ltd. Cadby Hall office and factory complex, a replacement plaque being erected at the former site of 82 Hammersmith Road in 1937, also now lost.
Charles Samuel Keene 1823–1891	"Artist, lived in a house on this site from 1865 to 1891"	Cadby Hall (site of 82 Hammersmith Road); Hammersmith W6	1937	c1983			A blue plaque was erected by the London County Council at Cadby Hall, the offices of J. Lyons & Co. Ltd., in 1937 to commemorate the site of the former residence of Charles Samuel Keene following the demolition of 112 Hammersmith Road and the loss of the memorial placed on that building by the LCC seven years previously. With the decline and takeover of J. Lyons & Co. in the late 1970s, the Cadby Hall complex was scaled down until the site was finally cleared in June 1983.
Edward Lear 1812–1888	"Artist and writer lived here"	30 Seymour Street; Marylebone W1H 7JB	1960	c2012		238	The London County Council erected a blue plaque to the artist, illustrator, musician, author and nonsensical poet Edward Lear in 1960. By 2012 the building was determined to be structurally unsound and the plaque was removed prior to a complete rebuild. The new facade of 30 Seymour Street has been made to look identical to the old one but is entirely modern and the scheme 'authenticity' rule means the plaque could not be reinstated at this address. English Heritage anticipated the rehanging of the plaque at a new address in its 2016 program announcement, but this has not yet come to pass.
John Leech 1817–1864	"Caricaturist Born Here"	28 Bennett Street, Stamford Street; Blackfriars	1907	1923			A chocolate brown encaustic ware plaque commemorating the humorous artist John Leech was erected by the London County Council at No.28 Bennett Street, Stamford Street, S.E. on 1 July 1907. 28 Bennett Street was demolished in 1923. The LCC erected a glazed ware plaque on the new building to record that Leech, and the engineer John Rennie, lived in houses formerly on the site, on 21 March 1929. This memorial has also been lost, the 1923 buildings being demolished in 1971.
Joseph Lister 1827–1912	"Surgeon lived here"	12 Park Crescent; Marylebone W1B 1PH	1915	2018		2501	One of the more 'storied' plaques in the Official London plaque scheme. A 'medallion style' bronze tablet to commemorate Joseph Lister, pioneer of antiseptic surgery who had died in 1912, was erected by the London County Council at 12 Park Crescent, Regent's Park on 20 August 1915. Park Crescent was damaged during the 1939–1945 war, and the plaque subsequently went missing. When the decision was taken by the Crown Estate to rebuild Park Crescent (with every intention of retaining the original Regency period facades by John Nash) plans for a new plaque were drawn up, but an appeal in The Lancet magazine led to the missing one being recovered; following the completion of the rebuild, Lister's plaque was unveiled for the second time in 1966. Unfortunately, during further building work in 2018, the plaque disappeared again. It has not been found, and was removed from the English Heritage list in 2019. Lister was immediately shortlisted for a new plaque, though this was not to be installed at 12 Park Crescent, it having transpired that the house was not as authentic as previously believed. The 'original' facade – listed in 1954 and Grade I listed in February 1970 – was in fact not Nash's, but a facsimile dating from the 1960s rebuild This discovery made the house ineligible for a memorial under the scheme rules. A new plaque to Lister was affixed to 52 Maple Street, Fitzrovia, where Lister had lived as a student, on 6th September 2024.
Lord Macaulay 1800–1859	"Died here"	Holly Lodge, Campden Hill; Kensington W8	1903	c2003			The first plaque to be installed under the auspices of the London County Council, a blue encaustic ware plaque to the historian and politician Thomas Babington Macaulay, was unveiled at Holly Lodge, Campden Hill, Kensington by Archibald Primrose, 5th Earl of Rosebery at a ceremony that took place on 26 November 1903 (Rosebery's speech is reproduced in full in the first volume of 'Indication of houses of historical interest in London' published by the LCC in 1907.) Macaulay's former residence was demolished c1968 for an extension to Queen Elizabeth College, the plaque being rescued and privately re-erected on the new building (Atkins Buildings) with a supplementary plaque recording its history in 1969. Macaulay's plaque was removed for the final time in 2003, prior to the Atkins Buildings being demolished; the Tasker House development now occupies the site. A later London County Council plaque commemorating Macaulay and his father, erected in 1930, can be seen at 5 The Pavement, Clapham.
Matthew Maris 1839–1917	"Painter Died here"	18 Westbourne Square; Paddington W8	1923	1950			The London County Council erected a plaque of blue glazed ware to commemorate the Dutch painter, etcher and lithographer Matthijs Maris at No.18 Westbourne Square, Paddington, on 9 May 1923. Westbourne Square no longer exists – it was all but destroyed by a V1 flying bomb in 1944.
Heinrich Karl Marx 1818–1883	"Socialist philosopher Lived and died here"	41 Maitland Park Road; Belsize Park NW3 2EX	1935	1935			A wreathed blue plaque of glazed ware erected by London County Council on 22 February 1935, the first attempt by the scheme to acknowledge Marx's time in London, it was vandalised by fascist supporters soon after installation. After a replacement was also vandalised, the owner declined the offer of a third. Despite this, it appears in the sixth and final volume of the LCC's 'Indication of houses of historical interest in London' published three years later, with no mention made of the plaque's loss. The area incorporating 41 Maitland Park Road was badly bombed during the 1939–1945 war, and was swept away in the 1950s to make way for the Maitland Park Estate. A brown Camden Borough Council plaque now marks the site. Marx was successfully commemorated by the official scheme thirty years later, a Greater London Council plaque being erected at 28 Dean Street, Soho in 1967 indicating the site of Marx's first floor flat at a height sufficiently above street level to deter all but the most ardent fascist supporter.
Heinrich Karl Marx 1818–1883	"Socialist philosopher Lived and died here"	41 Maitland Park Road; Belsize Park NW3 2EX	1935	1935			The second London County Council plaque to Marx, installed after the first was vandalised. It too was vandalised soon after installation by fascist supporters and the owner declined the offer of a third. 41 Maitland Park Road has since been demolished. Marx was eventually commemorated by the scheme in 1967, a Greater London Council plaque being erected at 28 Dean Street, Soho in that year.
The Rachel McMillan College built 1930 Margaret McMillan 1860–1931	"The Rachel McMillan College built 1930; Margaret McMillan,C.H. 1860–1931 Pioneer of Nursery Education lived here"	The Rachel McMillan College, Creek Road; Deptford SE8	1985	2003			The Greater London Council erected a plaque to Margaret McMillan at The Rachel McMillan College in Deptford in 1985. The plaque was removed prior to the redevelopment of the site in 2003. A new English Heritage plaque commemorating Margaret and her sister Rachel was affixed to 51 Tweedy Road, Bromley in 2009.
James Mill 1773–1836 John Stuart Mill 1806–1873	"In this house lived James Mill 1773–1836 and here was born his son John Stuart Mill 1806–1873"	39 Rodney Street; Pentonville	1907	c1949			The London County Council erected a chocolate brown encaustic ware plaque to James Mill and John Stuart Mill at 39 Rodney Street, Pentonville, on 18 October 1907. The house was demolished for the Priory Green estate in about 1949, the plaque being destroyed in the process. John Stuart Mill had, shortly prior to the unveiling of the Rodney Street plaque, been commemorated individually by the LCC at 18 Kensington Square, South Kensington, a green encaustic ware plaque having been affixed to this address on 26 March 1907; this plaque survives. One of the houses considered by the LCC for the commemoration of both men, discounted in favour of Rodney Street, was No.40 Queen Anne's gate, passed over because of its secluded position away from traffic. English Heritage affixed a blue roundel, commemorating the Mills' connection to this house, in 2012.
John Milton 1608–1674	"Site of the House in which John Milton wrote 'Paradise Lost' and died 1674.	Messrs. Legrand and Sutcliffe, 100 Bunhill Row; Finsbury	1901	1939–1945			The Society of Arts affixed an oblong memorial tablet of white terracotta commemorating the poet John Milton to the factory of Messrs. Legrand and Sutcliffe, a firm of hydraulic engineers, situated at No.100 (later No.125) Bunhill Row in late 1901.. The factory stood opposite the Artillery Ground on what had been many years previously the site of a handful of unnumbered terraced houses with front and rear gardens, named Artillery Row – one of which was Milton's former residence, where he died on 4 November 1674. This is understood to be the last 'memorial tablet' erected under the auspices of the SOA – the London County Council assuming responsibility for the scheme and erecting its first plaque in 1903. The memorial – the only oblong example erected by the SOA, the shape being dictated by the position in which it had to be placed - was lost, according to the 'List of Houses of Historical Interest in London Marked by Memorial Tablets' issued by the LCC in April 1947, as a result of enemy action during the 1939-1945 war. This fate is borne out by the LCC's Bomb Damage map which records most of the south western section of Bunhill Row as having been damaged beyond repair.
Sir Isaac Newton 1642–1727	Not yet determined	35 St.Martin's Street; Leicester Square WC2H 7HS	1881	1913			Sir Isaac Newton was first commemorated by the London plaque scheme in 1881 with a Society of Arts plaque at 35 St. Martin's Street, the location of his rooftop observatory, but this building was demolished in 1913. The site is now occupied by Westminster Reference Library. A second plaque to Newton had in the meantime been erected by the London County Council at 87 Jermyn Street on 9 September 1908; when this too was demolished, the plaque was recovered and attached to the new building with a supplementary plaque recording this history in October 1915.
Peter The Great 1672–1725	"Czar of Russia, lived here"	15 Buckingham Street; Strand WC2	1881	1906			The Society of Arts erected a memorial tablet to Peter I of Russia at 15 Buckingham Street in 1881. Notable residents of this house included Charles Dickens, the geologist William Smith and the architect William Burges but not, it turns out, the Czar of Russia. The Survey of London, recording (in 1937) the date of demolition as 1906, points out that, whilst many writers have stated that Peter the Great lodged at 15 Buckingham Street during his visit to England in 1697–1698, there does not seem to be a shred of contemporary evidence to substantiate the claim, adding that a likely explanation is that a misreading of 'Norfolk Buildings' (Peter's first London residence being 21 Norfolk Street) as 'York Buildings' (Buckingham Street being part of the York House Estate) led an early researcher to conclude that No.15 best fit written descriptions of the house – No.14 being ruled out on the grounds that this was, at the time, occupied by Samuel Pepys – and so a misstatement arose which was copied by later generations of writers. The new buildings erected on the site of Nos.15 and 16 Buckingham Street in 1906 were destroyed by bombing during the 1939–1945 war. Burdett House, a seven-storey office block, built in 1968, now occupies the site.
William Pitt, Earl of Chatham 1708–1778	"Prime Minister Lived Here"	Pitt House, North End Place; Hampstead	1909	1952			The London County Council erected a blue encaustic ware plaque to the former Prime Minister William Pitt (Pitt the Elder) at Pitt House, North End Place, Hampstead on 7 July 1909, this being affixed to a stone gate pier some distance from the house where he had convalesced for a time in 1766-7. The house subsequently fell into disrepair and was demolished in 1952. The plaque is listed as extant in the LCC's 'Tablet on Houses of Historical Interest' published 1960 suggesting the gate pier to which it was affixed might have survived for longer. All that survives of Pitt House today is a classical garden arch, now Grade II listed. Pitt would be commemorated by the scheme a second time, jointly with William Ewart Gladstone and Edward Geoffrey Stanley by the LCC at 10 St James's Square, St James's, on 4 October 1910. This memorial survives.
Charles Reade 1814–1884	"Novelist Lived Here"	70 Knightsbridge; Knightsbridge, SW1X 7LJ	1908	1942			The London County Council erected a chocolate brown encaustic ware plaque to the novelist Charles Reade at No.70 Knightsbridge on 28 February 1908. The house was demolished in 1942, Bowater House (completed 1958) being built on the site. Bowater House was in turn demolished in 2006 to make way for One Hyde Park.
John Rennie 1761–1821	"Engineer Died Here"	18 Stamford Street; Southwark SE1 9NY	1906	1923			The London County Council erected a blue encaustic ware plaque to the engineer John Rennie at No.18 Stamford Street, Southwark on 27 February 1906. 16, 18 and 20 Stamford Street were demolished in 1923. The LCC erected a glazed ware plaque to record that Rennie, and the caricaturist John Leech, lived in houses on the site, on 21 March 1929. This memorial has been also been lost, the 1923 buildings being demolished in 1971.
John Rennie 1761–1821	"These stones from old Waterloo Bridge 1817–1934 were placed here as a memorial to John Rennie, 1761–1821 Engineer"	Waterloo Bridge Southern Abutment; Southwark SE1	1951	1956			The first Waterloo Bridge, to the designs of the great Scottish engineer John Rennie, opened on 1817. Serious problems were found in Rennie's bridge piers from 1884 onward, and matters came to a head in the 1920s when it was necessary to remove parts of the superstructure and make reinforcements. In the 1930s, London County Council decided to demolish the bridge and replace it with a new structure, to the designs of Sir Giles Gilbert Scott. Work began in 1937, being interrupted by the 1939–1945 war. The completion of the bridge was deemed so essential that construction was allowed to continue during the hostilities, with a workforce comprised predominantly of women. The new bridge was officially opened in September 1942 and fully completed in 1945. On 19th September 1950 Hugh Casson, the director of architecture for the 1951 Festival of Britain, wrote to the Architect to the London County Council, Robert Matthew in connection with a memorial that had been constructed under the last arch of the new Bridge on the South Bank comprising an artful arrangement of two surviving columns and a length of balustrading salvaged from the old bridge, to commemorate Rennie, suggesting on behalf of the Festival that it would be appropriate for a plaque or inscription describing its purpose be made for it and asking that this proposal be recommended to the appropriate committee. The proposal was accepted, and after some discussion over whether the which of the words 'architect', 'designer' or 'engineer' was more appropriate, the Council sought approval for the inscription from Gilbert Scott which was granted on 14th March 1951. A bronze memorial tablet was affixed to the Rennie memorial by the LCC on 12th November 1951. The memorial incorporating the plaque was dismantled in 1956 when new buildings for the National Film Theatre were constructed on the site, its components including the plaque placed in storage. The intention was for the memorial to be reassembled under the north side of the bridge at some future point but no such reconstruction ever took place. Consideration was given to the reinstatement of the memorial in 1965, this coinciding with a proposal to reinstate a section of the Victoria Embankment in the vicinity of Waterloo Bridge, but nothing appears to have come of this. In the 1972, the Greater London council made detailed plans for a new memorial to John Rennie on the Victoria Embankment, near the northern abutment, and made enquiries to determine the whereabouts of the components of the 1951 memorial with the hope that these could be incorporated into the new one. No trace of the plaque or the accompanying granite sections could be found and this plan also never came to fruition..
Henry Handel Richardson 1870–1946	"Australian novelist Lived in this house 1910–1934 and wrote The Fortunes of Richard Mahony here"	90 Regent's Park Road; Regent's Park NW1	1957	1963			A London County Council roundel commemorating Ethel Richardson, known by the pen name Henry Handel Richardson was unveiled by Sir Eric Harrison, Australian High Commissioner to the United Kingdom at 90 Regent's Park Road in 1957 but lost to demolition six years later. This was the first plaque manufactured by Carter's Tile Co. Ltd of Poole, Dorset, the change of supplier from Doulton necessitated by that firm's relocation from Lambeth to the Midlands.
Samuel Richardson 1689-1761 Sir Edward Coley Burne-Jones 1833–1898	"Samuel Richardson (1689–1761) Novelist and Sir Edward Coley Burne-Jones (1833–1898) Painter Lived here"	The Grange, 111 North End Road; Fulham W14	1928	1958			The London County Council erected a plaque of blue glazed ware to two notable former residents of 111 North End Road, Fulham, the writer and printer Samuel Richardson and the painter and designer Edward Burne-Jones on 6 June 1928. The omission of the usual wreath border to create space for the inscription gave the plaque a strikingly modern appearance, foreshadowing the simple blue roundel design that would be standardised in the late 1940s. A surviving plaque to Algernon Swinburne and Theodore Watts-Dunton, erected in March 1926, is of a similar design. Latterly the house became derelict, the gardens being used as allotments during the 1939–1945 war. The 1952 edition of the LCC's 'Commemorative Tablets on Houses of Historical Interest' records the address as 40 North End Crescent. The Grange was demolished in 1958, the Lytton Estate being built on the site. Burne-Jones was commemorated by the London scheme for a second time in 1998, a plaque being erected by English Heritage at 41 Kensington Square, South Kensington – an address suggested to the LCC in 1927, rejected in favour of North End Road. A privately erected plaque in the 'Hammersmith Red Plaques' series now marks the site of 111 North End Road.
Samuel Rogers 1763–1855	"Poet Died Here"	22 St. James's Place; St. James's SW1A 1NH	1907	c1941			The London County Council erected a chocolate brown encaustic ware plaque to the poet Samuel Rogers at No.22 St. James's Place on 31 January 1907. The house, along with the adjacent No.21, was badly damaged during the 1939–1945 war. The site was subsequently purchased by the Crown Estate and an apartment block erected there between 1958 and 1960.
John Ruskin 1819–1900	"Artist and Author born here b.1819 d.1900"	54 Hunter Street; Brunswick Square	1900	c1970			The Society of Arts erected a plaque to John Ruskin in the year of his death at 54 Hunter Street. This was one of a number of run-down Georgian houses demolished to make way for the Brunswick Centre in the late 1960s.
Percy Bysshe Shelley 1792–1822	"Poet Lodged here".	26 Nelson Square; Southwark SE1 0PY	1932	1950			The London County Council had considered commemorating Shelley as early as 1904, but could not find an address that qualified, the poet rarely staying in any one place for any length of time. In 1931 a three-month residence at 26 Nelson Square in Southwark came to light and a plaque of blue glazed ware was duly erected there on 26 February 1932. The plaque, which in light of Shelly's brief residency stated that the poet 'lodged here' rather than 'lived here', these words uniquely following the curve of the wreath, was lost when the house was demolished in 1950, Southwark Borough Council having acquired the bomb damaged site for redevelopment. Shelley was much later commemorated by the Greater London Council at 15 Poland Street, Soho with an enamelled steel plaque in 1979, lost in 1996, replaced by English Heritage in 2000.
Sarah Siddons 1755-1831	"Actress Lived Here"	54 Great Marlborough Street; Soho W1F 7JU	1907	1953			A chocolate brown plaque was erected by London County Council at 54 Great Marlborough Street to commemorate the actress Sarah Siddons connection to the house on 20 June 1907. The LCC had established Siddons' residence at this address when deciding what to do about an earlier plaque, erected by the Society of Arts in 1876 (the first to commemorate a woman) which had been removed from her former Baker Street residence in 1905 prior to demolition (this plaque was eventually affixed to the rebuilt property and, when this too was demolished in the 1960s, gifted to the Theatre Museum. It is now part of the V&A Collection). 54 Marlborough Street was demolished in 1953 although this appears to have been overlooked by the LCC when preparing the list published in 1960.
Sir Hans Sloane 1660–1753	"The ground to the west of this building was given to the Parish of Chelsea in 1733 by Sir Hans Sloane President of the Royal Society. Born 1660. Died 1753"	King's Mead, 250 King's Road; Chelsea SW3 5UE	1953	1976			In 1953 London County Council erected a rectangular plaque of enamelled steel indicating the site of a plot of land donated to the Parish of Chelsea by Sir Hans Sloane, physician and benefactor of the British Museum, in 1733. The plaque was attached to a gate pier at the house named Kings's Mead, close to the junction of Dovehouse Street and Kings Road. It was replaced in 1977 when the site, now known as Dovehouse Gardens, was refurbished to commemorate the Queen's Silver Jubilee. The land in question was donated by Sloane for use as a burial ground which the Survey of London recorded as 'long disused' and employed as a recreation ground 'for the old men and women of the adjoining workhouse' in 1913. St. Luke's Workhouse would later become the Chelsea Institution, then Kingsmead Old People's Home, demolished in the 1970s. Sloane's residence in Bloomsbury is commemorated with a plaque at 4 Bloomsbury Place, one of the last erected by the LCC, put up in 1965.
Sir Hans Sloane 1660–1753	"The ground to the west of this building was given to the Parish of Chelsea in 1733 by Sir Hans Sloane President of the Royal Society. Born 1660. Died 1753"	250 King's Road; Chelsea SW3 5UE	1977	c1996.			The rectangular enamelled steel plaque erected by The London County Council in 1953 to indicate the site of a plot of land donated to the Parish of Chelsea by Sir Hans Sloane in 1733 was replaced in 1977, the new plaque – also enamelled steel and identical in wording (though now bearing the name of the Greater London Council) being affixed to the same gate pier as the earlier plaque. An entry in the unofficial 'Behind the Blue Plaques of London' suggests the plaque was still extant in 1994. English Heritage recorded this plaque as missing in 1996 and the decision was made not to replace it. Dovehouse Green was refurbished again - to commemorate the Queen's Golden Jubilee - in 2003. The house, and the gate pier to which the plaque was affixed, both survive.
John Snow 1813–1858	"Physician and specialist anaesthetist who discovered that cholera is water-borne lived here"	18 Sackville Street; Soho W1F 7JU	1949	1965			The London County Council erected a blue plaque to the physician John Snow at 18 Sackville Street in 1949. The house was demolished in 1965.
Mary Somerville 1780–1872	"Scientific Writer Lived Here"	12 Hanover Square; Mayfair W1S 1JJ	1909	1968			The London County Council erected a blue encaustic ware plaque to the scientific writer Mary Somerville at No.12 Hanover Square on 26 October 1909. The house was demolished in 1968.
Stamford Street	In one of the houses formerly on the site of this building John Leech (1817–1864), caricaturist, was born and in another John Rennie (1761–1821) Engineer, died.	Stamford Street; Southwark	1929	1971			The London County Council had erected plaques to the engineer John Rennie and the caricaturist John Leech at houses in Stamford Street in 1906 and 1907 respectively, but both were lost to demolition in 1923. Circumstances precluding the reinstatement of the original encaustic ware plaques, the LCC decided to erect a tablet of white glazed ware bearing their coat-of-arms to commemorate both men by way of a replacement, this being affixed to the new structure on 21 March 1929. The tablet, one of three large plaques in this style commemorating historic sites, all of which were erected in the early part of 1929, was lost to further redevelopment in 1971. The only surviving memorial of this type is in Bow Street
Strype Street	"Strype Street (Formerly Strype's Yard) derives its name from the fact that the house of John Strype, silk merchant, was situated there. ~ ~ ~ At that house was born in 1643 his son John Strype, Historian & Biographer, who died in 1737."	10 Leyden Street; Spitalfields E1	1929	2004		53457	The London County Council erected a tablet of white glazed ware bearing their coat-of-arms to commemorate Strype Street at No.10 Leyden Street – no suitable location being identified in Strype Street itself – on 8 January 1929, this being one of three large plaques in this style commemorating historic sites, all erected in the early part of 1929, of which only one, in Bow Street, survives. The relatively modern building to which the plaque had been affixed (Strype Street and Leyden Street were laid out in 1899–1904 on part of what had been the Halifax estate) was demolished c2004. English Heritage recorded the plaque missing in December 2005.
Arthur Seymour Sullivan 1842–1900	"Musical Composer Lived here"	58–60 Victoria Street; Victoria SW1	1928	1964			The London County Council erected a blue glazed ware plaque to the composer Arthur Seymour Sullivan at 58–60 Victoria Street on 20 October 1928. The terrace which had included Sullivan's apartment was bombed during the 1939–1945 war. The street was redeveloped in the 1960s – the plaque being recorded as lost in 1964.
Ronald Macdonald Hutchison Harry Tate 1872–1940	"Music hall comedian lived here"	72 Longley Road; Tooting SW17 9XL	1984	1991			A blue plaque was erected to the music hall sketch comedian Harry Tate by the Greater London Council at 72 Longley Road Tooting in 1984. The house was demolished in 1991, and flats now occupy the site. (Note: Image of the lost Harry Tate plaque held by The London Archives, 40 Northampton Road, London EC1R 0HB, reference SC/PHL/02/1252-70)
Alfred Lord Tennyson 1809–1892	"Poet Lived Here"	225 Hampstead Road; Camden NW1 2PY	1914	1941			The London County Council decided to erect a medallion style bronze tablet to commemorate Alfred, Lord Tennyson at 225 Hampstead Road in 1914, the plaque being affixed on 17 September of that year. The house, which was No.25 Mornington Place in Tennyson's time, was lost to bombing during the 1939–1945 war. The bombed-out house was the site of the still-unsolved murder of Mabel Church on 13th October 1941. Tennyson was not commemorated by the London plaque scheme again for over 50 years, an English Heritage blue plaque being affixed to 9 Upper Belgrave Street, Belgravia, where he had lived for a year or so in the 1880s, in 1994.
John Thurloe 1616-1668	"Secretary of State to Cromwell lived here during the term of his office 1645–1659 B:1616. D:1668. "	24 Old Square (Chancery Lane elevation); Lincoln's Inn	1890	1969			The Society of Arts erected a plaque of chocolate brown encaustic ware to Oliver Cromwell's Secretary of State John Thurloe on the Chancery Lane elevation of his chambers block, 24 Old Square, later XXIV Old Buildings, Lincoln's Inn, in 1890. The list of plaques published by the GLC in 1971 records it having been removed in 1969. Historic England's listing for 24 Old Buildings refers to some rebuilding taking place in 1967. Comparison of archive photographs to modern day images provides evidence that the building, which is known to have sustained damage in the 1941 'Blitz' was significantly altered, refronted or rebuilt in the 20th century. The site of Thurloe's chambers is now marked – still on the Chancery Lane elevation – by a plaque of blue glazed ware put up by the Cromwell Society. (Note: Image of the lost John Thurloe plaque held by The London Archives, 40 Northampton Road, London EC1R 0HB, reference SC/PHL/02/1252-112)
Lokamanya Tilak 1856–1920	"Indian patriot and philosopher stayed here in 1919"	60 Talbot Road; Bayswater W2 5LE	1961	1975			A plaque of blue glazed ware to commemorate the Indian nationalist, teacher, and independence activist Bal Gangadhar Tilak was erected by the London County Council at 60 Talbot Road, Bayswater in 1961, this being ceremonially unveiled by Kwame Nkrumah, President of Ghana, on 20 March of that year. Tilak had only lived here for a few months in 1919 but the owners of his main London residence – 10 Howley Place, Maida Vale – had refused consent for a plaque. The Talbot Road house was demolished by Westminster City Council to make way for flats in 1975, the plaque being returned to the Greater London Council. Tilak was commemorated by the London plaque scheme a second time when, in 1988, a new plaque was erected by English Heritage at 10 Howley Place – permission having been granted by the owners on this occasion.
Charles Turner 1774-1857	"Engraver Lived here"	56 Warren Street; Marylebone W1T	1924	Not yet determined			The London County Council placed a plaque of blue glazed ware to commemorate the engraver Charles Turner at No.56 Warren Street on 18 June 1924. The house still stands and is Grade II listed, the official list entry recording that the house was refronted in the late 20th Century.
Vladimir Ilyich Ulyanov 1870–1924	"Lenin Founder of the U.S.S.R. lived here 1902–1903"	30 Holford Square; Finsbury WC1	1942	1946			The Finsbury Communist Party had proposed a plaque to Lenin at 38 Holford Square – where he had lived from April 1902 to May 1903 – in 1938, the London County Council rejecting the suggestion on the grounds that he would not qualify for one until 1944 – the 20th anniversary of his death. With the Soviet Union's entry into the war in 1941, and with the encouragement of the Foreign Office the devout socialist Alderman Harold Riley and the Finsbury Anglo-Soviet Committee revived the idea, with support from Ivan Maisky, then Soviet Ambassador to Britain, and despite the plaque scheme having been suspended in 1941 as a wartime economy, in the changed political climate the LCC agreed to the idea and to waive the 20 year rule. The plaque – a tablet affixed by brackets to all that remained of the by-now bombed out house – was unveiled by Maisky with the Foreign Secretary Anthony Eden in attendance in March 1942 along with a bust of Lenin provided by the Soviet embassy. The unveiling ceremony was featured in a Pathe news reel in March 1942 and the 20 April 1942 edition of Life Magazine in a piece entitled 'England Falls in Love with Russia'. Immediately thereafter a more permanent display for the bust was sought and on the 22nd April 1942 a marble and concrete memorial to the design of Bernard Lubetkin was completed, sited opposite the remains of No. 30. Within a year the bust had to be replaced due to vandalism, and a police guard was mounted, an arrangement which quickly came to an end when Riley lost control of the council in 1946; the bust was subsequently attacked again and it became clear that the borough were no longer willing to keep the unpopular memorial on the site. Holford Square was cleared in 1948, and in 1951 – with the Cold War underway and the Berlin Airlift a recent memory – the tablet and bust were taken to Finsbury Town Hall for safekeeping. Lubetkin's casing was consigned by its designer to the foundations of Bevin Court. The intended final location for the memorial on completion of Bevin Court – which was to have been named Lenin Court before the Anglo-Soviet relationship turned frosty – can still be seen, to the right of the main entrance, together with a viewing aperture designed to allow the building's porter to oversee its wellbeing. The 1942 newsreel commentary states that the tablet would later be shipped to the Soviet Union but the change of political weather made this impractical and the tablet and bust remained at Finsbury Town Hall, then later the strongroom of Islington Town Hall, for almost thirty years. Mrs. Patricia Bradbury, then the newly elected Mayor of Islington, on learning of this when she took office in May 1972, suggested the plaque be gifted to the Soviets as was originally intended. This was duly arranged and the Russian Ambassador at the time, Mikhail Smirnovsky was formally presented with it on 1 January 1973. The bust of Lenin remained at Islington Town Hall until 1996 when it was transferred to Islington Museum.
Vladimir Ilyich Ulyanov 1870–1924	"Lenin Founder of the U.S.S.R. stayed here in 1905"	16 Percy Circus; Clerkenwell WC1	1962	1968			In 1962, at the suggestion of the Finsbury Communist Party, the London County Council consented to and then – despite critical press commentary and the New River Company's insistence on an indemnity against consequent damage – erected a blue plaque to Vladimir Ilyich Ulyanov, Lenin, at No.16 Percy Circus. Lenin had lodged here with his wife as one of 38 delegates to the 3rd Congress of the Russian Social Democratic Labour Party in 1905, held in the back rooms of public houses and restaurants by the Bolsheviks to hammer out a strategy for the Russian revolution of that year. The plaque was affixed to the ground floor wall on the left hand side of the Percy Circus elevation of the house. In August 1968 No.16–18 were demolished to make way for an extension of The Royal Scot Hotel. The plaque – which does not appear to have attracted the unwanted attention of vandals during the six years it was on show to the public – was retrieved by the Greater London Council who, in keeping with the scheme rules having refused consent for it to be rehung on the modern facsimile of a Victorian wall now fronting onto Percy Circus, gifted it to the Mayor of Moscow, Vladimir Promyslov in 1971. An unofficial memorial arranged by Trevor Burfield of Centremoor Ltd, the developer of the site, was erected in 1972, this being unveiled in August of that year – in the face of anti-Soviet demonstrations – by the then-Soviet Ambassador Mikhail Smirnovsky. To avoid provoking further trouble, the plaque was covered over for a time after the unveiling but it is now an established feature of the streetscape.
Graham Wallas 1858–1932	"Sociologist and Writer lived here 1923–1932"	38 St. Leonard's Terrace; Chelsea SW3 4QQ	1960	1974			The London County Council erected a plaque to the political psychologist and Fabian Graham Wallas at 38 St. Leonard's Terrace, close to the Royal Hospital in Chelsea, in 1960. Nos.37–41 were among the houses in St.Leonard's Terrace, Tedworth Square, Tedworth Gardens and Radnor Walk demolished in 1974 to make way for a modern four-storey development of flats and self-contained maisonettes with a basement car park completed c1978.
Sir David Wilkie 1785–1841	"Painter Lived Here"	144 Kensington High Street; Kensington W8	1907	1931			The London County Council erected a chocolate brown encaustic ware plaque to the painter Sir David Wilkie at No.144 Kensington High Street (formerly No.24 Lower Phillimore Place) on 21 January 1907. The house, and what else remained of Upper and Lower Phillimore Place were demolished in 1931–32, replaced by blocks of shops and flats. Phillimore Court on the corner of Campden Hill Road and Kensington High Street now occupies the site.

== Plaques replaced ==
This section records plaques which have been replaced due to damage, manufacturing error or biographical error with a new plaque at the same location.

Subject	Inscription	Location	Year installed	Year removed	Photo	Open Plaques ref	Notes
The Adelphi	"This building stands on the site of Adelphi Terrace built by the brothers Adam in 1768–1774. Among the occupants of the terrace were Topham and Lady Diana Beauclerk, David Garrick, Richard D'Oyly Carte, Thomas Hardy & George Bernard Shaw. The London School Of Economics and The Savage Club also had their premises here."	The Adelphi, 1–11 John Adam Street (Adelphi Terrace elevation); Adelphi, WC2N 6BJ	1951	1952			The London County Council authorised the creation of a memorial to notable former residents of the Adelphi district of Westminster in the form of an inscription carved into the easternmost pillar supporting the portico of the monumental Art Deco 'New Adelphi' building, which had been constructed in the in 1930s on the site of the Adams Brothers neoclassical Adelphi Buildings, in 1951. Shortly after completion of the work in November 1951, instructions were given to alter the inscription to include the full name of London School of Economics and Political Science, this work being completed in early 1952.
Samuel Taylor Coleridge 1722–1834	"Poet & Philosopher Lived Here"	71 Berners Street; Fitzrovia W1T 3LA	1905	1966			A chocolate brown wreathed London County Council plaque was erected to commemorate Coleridge at 71 Berners Street on 20 December 1905. The house was demolished in 1908 to make way for an extension to the Bourne & Hollingsworth department store and the plaque re-erected with a supplementary tablet with the inscription 'Tablet Fixed 1905: Premises rebuilt & tablet refixed 1908' the same year. The plaque was re-erected for a second time in 1929 following the construction of an enlarged Bourne & Hollingsworth, with a new supplementary tablet, this with the inscription 'Tablet Fixed 1905: Premises rebuilt & tablet refixed 1929'. These moves contributed to the eventual deterioration of the plaque and it was replaced under the aegis of the Greater London Council in 1966 with a standard blue example, which, having been manufactured at the transition between the two bodies, bears the name of the London County Council which had been abolished on 1 April 1965. The 1929 supplementary tablet was removed at the same time - the space it occupied being patched with a stone panel matching the colour of the art deco façade which can still clearly be seen beneath the 1966 plaque.
Benjamin Disraeli 1804–1881	"Earl of Beaconsfield Born Here 1804"	22 Theobalds Road; Holborn WC1X 8NX	1904	c1940			Erected by the LCC in 1904, this chocolate brown encaustic ware plaque was destroyed during the 1939–1945 war and was replaced with a ceramic replica in 1948 - the material used to make the majority of plaques for the scheme having been changed to Doulton glazed ware in 1923.
Flying Bomb 1944	"The first Flying Bomb on London fell here 13th June 1944"	Railway Bridge, Grove Road; Bow E3	1985	1987			The GLC erected an enamelled steel plaque at this site on the 41st anniversary of the first V1 'Doodlebug' to fall on London, in June 1985. This was stolen in 1987. English Heritage replaced it with a traditional ceramic plaque, bearing their name along the top edge but otherwise identically worded, in 1988.
Sigmund Freud 1856-1939	"Founder of Psychoanalysis lived here in 1938–39"	The Freud Museum, 20 Maresfield Gardens; Hampstead NW3 5SX	1956	2002			The first plaque commemorating Freud at 20 Maresfield Gardens was erected by the London County Council and unveiled by his daughter Anna in 1956, the 100th anniversary of his birth. Issues with the usual manufacturer forced the LCC to seek an alternative, resulting in the use of an inferior surface mounted enamelled steel item. When in 2002 it was decided to commemorate Anna Freud at the same address, English Heritage took the opportunity to replace Sigmund's steel plaque with a matching one of the traditional ceramic type, this new plaque featuring a subtly altered inscription.
Thomas Gainsborough 1727-1788	Not yet determined	Schomberg House 80 Pall Mall; St James's SW1Y 5ES	1881	1951			The current London County Council blue plaque of 1951 replaced a tablet erected by the Society of Arts at 80 Pall Mall in 1881 which had weathered beyond the point of legibility. This was not the Schomberg House of Gainsborough's time, this having been demolished in 1850. The replacement building to which the SOA tablet had been affixed was pulled down c1909. The replacement for the 1909 building was largely demolished in 1956, the facades of 81–82 being retained and that of No.80 being rebuilt to its original form.
John Richard Green 1837–1883	"Historian of the English People Lived here"	4 Beaumont Street; Marylebone W1G 6AA	1909	1964			Green was first commemorated at 4 Beaumont Street by the London County Council with a chocolate brown encaustic ware plaque on 17 March 1909. This house was demolished in 1924 and the plaque re-erected on the new structure, but it was damaged in the process, its subsequent deterioration – reportedly cracked in half in the early 1960s – leading to its eventual replacement by the LCC by with a standard blue roundel in 1964. A rare late example of the 'authenticity' rule being waived – Green had no connection to this property, and the replacement plaque states that he 'lived in a house on this site' – the house to which it was affixed has since been rebuilt again twice, with the current structure dating to 1988. The Council, being eager to recognise Green's connection to the East End of London, put up a second tablet of chocolate brown encaustic ware in his memory at St Philip's Vicarage, Newark Street, Whitechapel, on 19th April 1910. This plaque survives.
George Frederick Handel 1685–1759	"George F. Handel Musician Lived here B:1685 D:1759"	25 Brook Street; Mayfair W1K 4HB	1870	1951			Handel was first commemorated at 25 Brook Street by the Society of Arts in 1870. This brown encaustic ware plaque had, in the polluted London atmosphere, weathered past the point of legibility by the middle of the 20th century and was replaced by the LCC with a standard blue example in 1951.
George Frederick Handel 1685-1759	"Musician lived and died here"	25 Brook Street, London; Mayfair W1K 4HB	1951	2001			The 1951 LCC plaque, a replacement for a damaged SOA plaque of 1870 was itself replaced in 2001, English Heritage taking the opportunity to correct the previous anglicisation of Handel's middle name, change his occupation from 'Musician' to 'Composer' and move it to a lower position on the facade, aligning it to their 1997 plaque to Jimi Hendrix at No.23 Brook Street in the process.
Thomas Hardy 1840–1928	"Poet and novelist 1840–1928 lived here 1878–1881"	172 Trinity Road; Tooting SW17 7HT	1940	1962			The first plaque to Thomas Hardy at 172 Trinity Road was of brown glazed ware, erected by the London County Council in March 1940, shortly before wartime economies forced the closure of the London-wide plaque scheme for seven years. The plaque was one of six made to a new and greatly simplified design introduced in 1939; the colour was described as a 'warm sepia', the lettering cream, and the wreath omitted, giving more space for the inscription. After the first, a thin white border was added. After the war, the LCC seems to have had a change of heart as after erecting the last three brown plaques (meant to be put up in 1940 but delayed by the hostilities) in 1947-8 they reverted to blue. It seems that the Hardy plaque was faulty as it quickly wore out and had to be replaced, the current standard blue LCC roundel going up in 1962.
Thomas Hood 1799-1845	"Poet Died Here"	Devonshire Lodge, 28 Finchley Road; St John's Wood NW8 6ES	1912	n/a		54218	The London County Council erected a tablet of Hopton Wood Stone at Thomas Hood's former residence on 30 April 1912. This was not the first memorial erected to Hood by the LCC; in 1908, the council – believing Devonshire Lodge to have been demolished – had affixed a blue encaustic ware roundel to 17 Elm Tree Road house, since lost, in the rather out-of-the-way environs of Elm Tree Road, St. Johns Wood. Information having come to light revealing that Devonshire Lodge still stood, the LCC decided to commemorate Hood a second time in this more prominent location. The stone plaque weathered badly, and was illegible by 1960. In 2001 English Heritage decided to add a standard blue roundel to supplement the LCC plaque, on the lower floor, leaving the original in situ below two upper storey windows. A detailed drawing for the original plaque survives in the English Heritage archive, being reproduced on page 494 of 'Lived in London'
Rudyard Kipling 1865–1936	"Poet and story writer lived here 1889–1891"	43 Villiers Street; Charing Cross WC2N 6NE	1940	1957			Kipling was first commemorated at 43 Villiers Street by the scheme in 1940 – only four years after his death – with one of the London County Council's experimental series of brown plaques. As with the plaque commemorating Thomas Hardy in the same series, it weathered badly and was replaced with a standard blue example in 1957.
David Lloyd George 1863-1945	"Earl Lloyd George of Dwyfor 1865-1945 Prime Minister lived here"	3 Routh Road; Wandsworth Common SW18 3SW	1967	1992			The first plaque to Lloyd George at 3 Routh Road, erected by the Greater London Council in 1967, gave an incorrect date of birth – he was born in 1863, not 1865 – and was replaced by English Heritage in 1992.
Guglielmo Marconi 1874-1937	"The pioneer of wireless communication lived here in 1896–1897"	71 Hereford Road; Bayswater	1952	1954			The first London County Council blue plaque at this site, erected on 25 April 1952 (Marconi's birthday) was found to be defective and replaced in 1954.
George Moore 1852–1933	"Novelist, lived and died in this house"	121 Ebury Street; Belgravia SW1W 9QU	1936	1937			The first London County Council blue plaque at this site, erected in 1936, gave an incorrect date of birth (1851, Moore was born on 24 February 1852) and described him as a novelist rather than an author. It was replaced, after The Spectator noted these errors in its 15 January 1937 issue, the following year. The plaque illustrated in 'Indication of Houses of Historical Interest in London' is the replacement. No mention is made of the error and the – usually precise – date of installation is absent from the text.
Arthur Onslow 1691–1768	Speaker of The House of Commons from 1728 to 1761 Lived Here	20 Soho Square; Soho W1D 3QW	1912	c1925			Onslow was first commemorated with a Hopton Wood Stone tablet erected at 20 Soho Square by the London County Council in July 1912. The plaque was recovered after the Restoration era building was demolished to make way for an eight storey office block being built for Messrs. Crosse and Blackwell in 1924–6 but was deemed unsuitable for re-use and a new bronze plaque was made instead, this being erected in 1927.
Sardar Vallabhbhai Javerbhai Patel 1875–1950	"Indian Statesman lived here"	23 Aldridge Road Villas; Ladbroke Grove W11 1BN	1986	1991			The original plaque, erected by the Greater London Council in 1986, was damaged during building work. It was replaced with an exact replica, retaining the name of the long-since-abolished GLC along its top edge, by English Heritage in 1991.
William Pitt the Younger 1759–1806	"Lived here"	120 Baker Street; Marylebone W1D 3QW	1904	1925			A pale green encaustic ware plaque to William Pitt the Younger was installed at 120 Baker Street (then 14 York Place) by the London County Council on 15 August 1904, but this disappeared when the house was remodelled in 1925. Plans were made in the late 1930s to replace it with a brown plaque in the LCC's experimental series but the war intervened before it could be made and in the end a standard blue roundel was affixed in 1949. The drawing for the original plaque survives in the English Heritage archive, being reproduced on page 412 of 'Lived in London'. It was similar to the William Hazlitt plaque at 6 Frith Street, which was erected in 1905. This was also pale green in colour, but has weathered to light blue over time. A drawing of the intended replacement also appears in the book, revealing it to be identical in design to the eventual replacement in every respect except colour.
Lord John Reith 1889–1971	"First Director-General of the BBC lived here 1924–1930"	6 Barton Street; Westminster SW1P 3NG	1994	1995			The original plaque of 1994 included Lord Reith's first forename but omitted his second (Charles) and it was decided to replace it with a new plaque, omitting both forenames, this being affixed the following year.
John Ruskin 1819-1900	"Lived Here"	28 Herne Hill; Herne Hill SE24 9QS	1909	c1925			Not the first plaque in the scheme to Ruskin – a Society of Arts plaque is recorded as having been affixed to his birthplace, 54 Hunter Street, Bloomsbury, demolished to make way for the Brunswick Centre in the late 1960s – the first memorial at 28 Herne Hill was a standard roundel erected by London County Council on 19 July 1909 which was lost when the house was demolished c1925, being replaced by two new houses, 26 and 28 Herne Hill. The replacement plaque marking the site, dated 1925 and bearing the initials LCC, was placed in 1926. It is, unusually, bronze, and affixed to a stout wooden post in the garden, the houses being set too far back from the road for a plaque to be visible to passers by from the pavement.
Percy Bysshe Shelley 1792-1822	"Percy Bysshe Shelley 1792–1822 Poet lived here"	15 Poland Street; Soho SE1 0PY	1979	1996			The London County Council had commemorated Shelley in 1931 with a plaque at 26 Nelson Square, obliterated when the house was demolished by Southwark Borough Council in 1950. In 1979 the Greater London Council erected an enamelled steel memorial at 15 Poland Street, where Shelley had lived for a typically short period (as many as 19 different London lodgings have been identified) in 1818, the material chosen in preference to ceramic due to weakened brickwork resulting from an IRA bomb that detonated nearby on 29 January 1977. This plaque was mislaid during renovation work in 1996, and was replaced with an English Heritage one, also enamelled steel, in 2000.
Sydney Smith 1771–1845	"Author and Wit Lived Here"	14 Doughty Street; King's Cross WC1N 2PL	1905	1906			The wreathed chocolate brown plaque of 1905, placed by the London County Council at 14 (formerly No.8) Doughty Street to commemorate Sydney Smith's residence, was found to be faulty in manufacture and was replaced the following year.
Tyburn Tree	"Here stood Tyburn Tree Removed 1759"	Junction of Edgware Road and Bayswater Road; Marble Arch W2	1909	1964			A triangular London County Council plaque from 1909 originally marked the location of the tree at ground level. Made of granolithic with the wording in brass and a depiction of the ancient gallows at the centre, it was replaced with the current circular memorial by the Greater London Council in 1964, the original having been displaced by road improvements. The London County Council does not initially appear to have considered this marker to be part if the 'Indication of houses of historical interest in London' scheme, being absent from their books on the subject.
Evelyn Underhill 1875–1941	"Christian philosopher and teacher lived here 1907–1939"	50 Campden Hill Square; Holland Park W8 7JR	1975	1990			The Greater London Council erected a blue plaque to the Anglo-Catholic writer and pacifist Evelyn Underhill at 50 Campden Hill Square, Holland Park in 1975. Examination of the structure led the GLC to conclude that the tight space called for a different style of plaque to the usual blue roundel, so one was made – this being rectangular, surface mounted, and instead of the enamelled steel hitherto employed in similar circumstances, was made from fibreglass. The plaque did not weather well – it was found to be damaged when inspected in 1988 and the decision made to replace it. Measurements having been taken, it transpired that a standard blue roundel would fit after all. The new English Heritage plaque - a standard blue ceramic roundel, 495mm (19½ inches) in diameter, was affixed in 1990. Fibreglass was used by the scheme on only one other occasion – a unique oval plaque commemorating William Blake and John Linnell at Old Wyldes', North End, Hampstead, this also being put up in 1975 – in this instance the material being chosen as suitable for attachment to the weatherboarded walls of the seventeenth century farmhouse.
Sir Robert Walpole 1676-1745	"Earl of Orford. lived here. B: 1676 D:1745"	5 Arlington Street; St James's SW1A 1RA	1881	1976			The Society of Arts erected a terracotta encaustic ware plaque to Sir Robert Walpole, later Robert Walpole, 1st Earl of Orford, KG, PC, at 5 Arlington Street in 1881. Badly weathered, it was replaced with a joint plaque to Sir Robert and his son Horace by the Greater London Council in 1976.
Thomas Young 1773–1829	"Man of Science Lived Here"	48 Welbeck Street; Marylebone	1905	1951			The London County Council erected a light green encaustic ware plaque at Young's former Welbeck Street residence on 3 April 1905. Having deteriorated, it was replaced with the present standard blue roundel by the LCC in 1951.

== Plaques preserved ==
This section records plaques that, though removed from the official London Blue Plaque Scheme, still exist. The 'location' column indicates the original location of the plaque, not its current site. It is not uncommon for recovered plaques to be donated to museums or the plaques original sponsors. A number of plaques that have been rescued, in some cases for possible future reuse, are kept by English Heritage in archives at Wrest Park, Bedfordshire. The archive is not open to the public and the full contents of the collection are not currently available, however some of these 'orphaned' plaques were examined in two short films made by English Heritage about 'lost' plaques, released in April 2024.

Subject	Inscription	Location	Year installed	Year removed	Photo	Open Plaques ref	Notes
Sir Joseph Banks 1743–1820	"President Royal Society Naturalist Lived Here"	32 Soho Square; Soho W1D 3JR	1911	1938			The London County Council erected a blue encaustic ware plaque to Joseph Banks at 32 Soho Square on 14 February 1911. The house was demolished in 1937. A stone tablet affixed to the new building by the LCC in 1938 commemorates Banks and two of his proteges, Robert Brown and David Don, and the meetings of the Linnean Society. The 1911 plaque is revealed to have survived in a short film about 'orphan' plaques in the care of English Heritage released in April 2024. The London County Council's Survey of London published a detailed description of the buildings on this site, edited by Francis Sheppard, in 1966.
William Booth 1829–1912 Catherine Booth 1829–1890	"Here Lived William Booth 1829–1912 Evangelist and founder of The Salvation Army and his wife Catherine Booth 1829–1890 Evangelist"	1 Rookwood Road; Stamford Hill N16	1963	1971			The London County Council Town Planning Committee decided, on 3rd October 1960 to erect a memorial plaque to William and Catherine Booth, founders of The Salvation Army at 17 Rookwood Road, Hackney. This was to have been unveiled at a ceremony on 16th September 1961. Eleven days before the event, it came to light that, as the result of an error in Harold Begbie's 'Life of William Booth', the LCC had chosen the wrong house for the memorial. The Salvation Army, which still owned the lease to the Booth's former residence (to which they had moved in 1885) notified the council that the correct location was in fact a house named 'Kerisdale', No.1 Rookwood Road. The unveiling ceremony was duly cancelled, new searches undertaken and permissions obtained, and the plaque erected at the correct address in 1963. No.1 Rookwood Road was demolished to make way for modern accommodation in 1971. In April 2024 the plaque was revealed to be one of the examples of 'orphan' plaques preserved in the English Heritage archive at Wrest Park. An unusual feature of the plaque is that the raised letters are outlined in red rather than the usual grey in a nod to the Salvation Army's colour.
Emma Cons 1837–1912 Lilian Baylis 1874–1937	"Founders of The Old Vic lived here"	Surrey Lodge, 6 Morton Place; Waterloo SE1 7BJ	1952	1971		78426	The London County Council erected a blue plaque to Lilian Baylis and Emma Cons, the founders of the Old Vic theatre, at 6 Morton Place, Stockwell, in 1952. The house was demolished in 1971. The plaque was presented to the Governors of the Old Vic for the Theatre Museum, and is at the time of writing on display at the V&A East Storeroom in Stratford, London E20. Baylis and Cons were subsequently commemorated individually with Greater London Council plaques – Baylis at 27 Stockwell Park Road, Stockwell in 1974, Cons at 136 Seymour Place, Marylebone in 1978.
Captain Cook 1728–1779	"Circumnavigator lived here"	88 Mile End Road; Stepney Green E1 4UN	1907	1959			The London County Council commemorated Captain James Cook's connection to 88 Mile End Road with a terracotta memorial tablet on 4 October 1907. This was removed in 1959 when the house was demolished. The plaque was shipped to Australia (with one of the chimney pots) as a gift to the Trustees of Captain Cook's Landing Place where it still resides. A much larger slate plaque was erected by the Greater London Council on a wall at the site of 88 Mile End Road in 1970, the unusual choice of form and material reflecting the exceptional nature – in the eyes of the GLC at the time – of a 'site of' commemoration.
Charles Dickens 1812–1870	"Novelist Lived Here"	Furnival's Inn; Holborn W1W 5BR	1886	1897		31035	A Society of Arts plaque originally affixed to Furnival's Inn, in which Dickens resided for a time, in 1886. This building was demolished in 1897, being replaced by the Prudential Assurance buildings where the plaque can be seen today, having been privately re-erected in the 1910s. The appendices of the book "Indication of houses of historical interest in London Volume III" published by the LCC records the plaque in the courtyard of Prudential Buildings, Holborn Bars in 1912. Perhaps in error, it is recorded as being part of the scheme in the edition of the LCC's 'Commemorative Tablets on Houses of Historical Interest' published in 1952. Only the Doughty Street plaque is listed in the 1960 edition.
Charles Dickens 1812–1870	"Novelist Lived Here in Boyhood"	13 Johnson Street; Somers Town NW1	1911	1932		55907	A tablet of Hopton Wood Stone was placed at No.13 Johnson Street, Somers Town to commemorate the former residence of Charles Dickens, by London County Council on 23 August 1911. The building was demolished in 1932 and flats now cover the site. The tablet was presented by the LCC to the Charles Dickens museum which had opened at 48 Doughty Street in 1925. It is displayed in the back garden of the house. An earlier LCC plaque to Dickens, erected in 1903, can be seen on the front of the museum building – this plaque remains part of the official scheme. Johnson Street was renamed Cranleigh Street between 1936 and 1939. The site of the Dickens' family residence was marked by the Brook & Cranleigh House Residents Association with a blue plaque in 2011.
Air Chief Marshal Lord Dowding 1882–1970	"Leader of Fighter Command lived here 1941–1951"	3 St Mary's Road; Wimbledon SW19 7DF	2000	2009		579	Blue plaque erected by English Heritage in 2000 at 3 St Mary's Road, Wimbledon, removed by them prior to the rebuilding of the house in 2009. A privately erected replacement adorns the new structure. The English Heritage plaque is currently on display at the National Memorial Arboretum in Staffordshire.
John Flaxman 1755–1826	"sculptor lived and died here"	7 Greenwell Street; Fitzrovia W1W 5BR	1876	2016		235	The Society of Arts erected a plaque to commemorate the sculptor John Flaxman at 7 Buckingham Street in 1876. The street was renamed Greenwell Street in 1937 to remember the Greenwell family who were prominent in the Marylebone area. Scheduled for demolition in the early 1980s, efforts were made to save Flaxman's former studio citing his former residency as a reason for the significance of the structure, but these were unsuccessful and the Georgian building was subsequently demolished by Westminster City Council. The plaque was privately re-erected on the block of flats built on the site. English Heritage briefly reincorporated the plaque into the official London plaque scheme from around 2010 until 2016 when it was de-listed on the grounds that the location was inauthentic.
Benjamin Franklin 1706–1790	"Lived Here. Printer, Philosopher and Statesman"	7 Craven Street; Charing Cross W1W 5BR	1869	1914		54272	Benjamin Franklin was known to have lived at 7 Craven Street during his sixteen years in London and this address was, in 1869, one of the earliest recipients of a memorial tablet from the 'official' London-wide plaque scheme then administrated by the Society of Arts. In 1903, after the scheme had been transferred to London County Council, research by Sir Laurence Gomme revealed that the house was not in fact the former Franklin residence – comparison of rate books and street directories revealing that Franklin's lodgings had been renumbered twice in the intervening years and what had been No.7 in his time survived as No.36. The truth came to light in 1913 when attempts were being made to save No.7 from redevelopment due to its supposed historical significance and the Society of Arts was forced to admit its mistake. The LCC erected a bronze 'medallion style' plaque at No.36 in 1914 and for a time, before No.7 was demolished, the two plaques stood on opposite sides of the street, no doubt leading to some confusion. In the 20th century No.36 was used as a hotel, then as a base for several non-profit groups (and was for a time occupied by squatters), but was in dire condition at the end of the century when the freehold was granted to the Friends of Benjamin Franklin House by the UK government. Following structural reinforcement and restoration the house opened as The Benjamin Franklin House Museum on 17 January 2006, the 300th anniversary of Franklin's birth. The SOA plaque from the long-lost No.7, which had been for many years in the possession of the Museum of London, was presented to the museum and is on display in the basement corridor.
David Garrick 1716–1779	"Actor Lived Here"	5 Adelphi Buildings, Adelphi WC2	1876	1936		54273	This plaque was originally sited at No.5 Adelphi Terrace, one of a block of 24 unified neoclassical terrace houses built between 1768 and 1772 by the Adam brothers, incorporating a new headquarters for the Society of Arts (latterly the Royal Society of Arts). Many of these were demolished in 1936, being replaced with the New Adelphi, a monumental Art Deco building, with only No.11 and the purpose-built Royal Society of Arts headquarters (expanded to incorporate two of the former houses) surviving from the old development. The plaque was assumed to have been lost or destroyed at this time, until 2015 when remarkably it resurfaced to be sold at auction. Acquired by the Garrick Club, it has been put on display in the reception area of the club at 15 Garrick Street. The London plaque scheme later commemorated Garrick at Garrick's Villa, Hampton Court Road, the GLC erecting a standard blue roundel there in 1970.
Alfred Gilbert 1854–1934	"Sculptor Lived here"	16 Maida Vale; St John's Wood W9 1TE	1955	1966			The London County Council erected a ceramic blue plaque to commemorate the sculptor Sir Alfred Gilbert at his former home and studio, 16 Maida Vale, St John's Wood in 1955. The house was demolished in 1966 and Ada House, a block of flats completed in 1969, now occupies the site. The plaque is glimpsed in the English Heritage short film 'Orphan Plaques part 1' revealing it to be in store at Wrest Park as of April 2024.
Charles George Gordon 1833–1885	"born here 1833 killed at Khartoum 1885"	29 Woolwich Common (Kempt Terrace); Woolwich SE18 4HB	1959	1971		5330	The London County Council erected a ceramic blue plaque at 29 Woolwich Common, Woolwich SE18 (Kempt Terrace) to commemorate the birthplace of General Gordon, in 1959. This replaced an earlier memorial to Gordon erected by the Woolwich Antiquarian Society in January 1900. Following a battle between the Ministry of Housing and local and national preservation groups, the terrace including Gordon's former residence was demolished in 1971. The plaque was presented to the Gordon Boys’ School by the GLC. Siedle House and Watling House, part of the Woolwich Common housing estate, now stand on the site. Remarkably the original Woolwich Antiquarian Society plaque also survives and is currently part of a display at Greenwich Heritage Centre.
Joseph Grimaldi 1778–1837	"Clown Lived and died here"	22 Calshot Street; Finsbury N1	1938	1960			The London County Council erected a plaque to the clown Grimaldi at 22 Calshot Street, Finsbury, in 1938. This was one of the last eight plaques erected before the 1939–45 war, among the very last of the wreathed design and the first to be recorded in the 'New Series' of LCC published pamphlets. In Grimaldi's time it was 22 Southampton Street, renumbered 33 in 1889 and renamed Calshot Street in the year the plaque was put up. The plaque was taken down in 1960 when the terrace was scheduled for demolition. After Islington council uncovered evidence of an earlier residence – unlike Calshot Street, one occupied by Grimaldi while he was still performing – English Heritage erected a new blue plaque at 56 Exmouth Market, Clerkenwell in 1989. In April 2024 the 1938 plaque was revealed as one of the items in English Heritage's Wrest Park archive, being shown – complete with the damage incurred during a difficult extraction from the wall of the house, a large part of which remains attached to the reverse – in their second short film about the 'orphan' plaques in their collection.
Emma, Lady Hamilton c.1765–1815	"Lived Here 1803–1806"	11 Clarges Street; Piccadilly W1J	1958	1963		31616	An LCC Blue Plaque erected in 1958 at 11 Clarges Street, Piccadilly, removed when the building was demolished five years later. The plaque was presented to the author Michael Hardwick – husband of Mollie Hardwick, also an author who later wrote a biography of Lady Hamilton – in 1964. It now forms part of the ephemera collection of Sankeys, a public house at 39 Mount Ephraim, Royal Tunbridge Wells.
Octavia Hill 1838–1912	"Housing reformer lived here"	8 Fitzroy Street; Fitzrovia W1T 4BJ	1951	1961			The London County Council erected a blue glazed ware plaque to Octavia Hill at 8 Fitzroy Street, Fitzrovia in 1951. The plaque was removed when that building was demolished in 1961 and subsequently relocated to the first floor of 1 Milbank, at the time the offices of the Church Commissioners but today used by the House of Lords, for display. The building is not open to the general public. Hill was commemorated again by the scheme when English Heritage erected a blue plaque at 2 Garbutt Place, Marylebone in 1991.
Edmund Kean 1787–1833	"Actor Lived here"	12 Clarges Street; Piccadilly W1J	1904	1963			The London County Council erected a blue encaustic ware plaque to the actor Edmund Kean at No.12 Clarges Street on 20 October 1904. The plaque was saved when the building was demolished in 1963. The V&A Catalogue records that the plaque was donated to the now defunct British Theatre Museum, a part of the Victoria & Albert Museum, by the Greater London Council in December 1964. It is not currently on display, nor is it, at the time of writing, one of the objects available to view at the V&A East storehouse opened in 2025. A photograph of the house showing the plaque in situ appears in an article about Mayfair in Picture Post magazine (No.80, published January 28, 1939).
The Labour Party	"Site of the Congregational memorial hall the Labour Party was founded here 27 February 1900"	Caroone House; Farringdon EC4M 7RD	1985	2002		2933	This black plaque of a unique design – acknowledging, as with the equally distinct plaque to Captain Cook, the exceptional marking a 'site-of' rather than an authentic building – was affixed to a 70's office block named Caroone House in 1985, shortly before the Greater London Council was abolished. It was removed from the scheme immediately prior to the demolition of this building in 2004. The plaque was subsequently privately re-erected close to its former location, at 5 Fleet Place, part of the Ludgate West development.
William Charles Macready 1793–1873	"Actor Born here"	45 Stanhope Street; Regent's Park NW1	1928	1964			The London County Council erected a blue glazed ware plaque to the actor William Charles Macready at 45 Stanhope Street (3 Mary Street at the time of Macready's birth), Regent's Park, on 25 June 1928. The house was subsequently demolished – the date of this is undetermined, but what remains of the curtailed Stanhope street is now lined by post-war residential blocks. The plaque is now in the possession of the Victoria and Albert Museum. The V&A Catalogue records that it was originally donated to the now defunct British Theatre Museum Association by the LCC and that is not currently on display – nor is it one of the objects available to view at the V&A East storehouse opened in 2025.
Frederick Denison Maurice 1805–1872	Theologian Lived Here	21 Queen Square; Bloomsbury	1907	1967			A tablet of chocolate brown encaustic ware was erected to commemorate the former residence of John Frederick Denison Maurice at 21 Queen Square, Bloomsbury, by London County Council on 30 September 1907. The property adjoined the Ladies Turkish Baths to the rear of the (then brand new) Imperial Hotel (1907–1967) which was owned by the hotel. Part of the 1967 brutalist rebuild of the hotel now occupies the site. Maurice was commemorated by the London plaque scheme for a second time by the Greater London Council, a standard blue roundel being erected at 2 Brunswick Place, Marylebone in 1977. In April 2024 the 1907 plaque was revealed as one of the items in English Heritage's Wrest Park archive, being glimpsed in their second short film about the 'orphan' plaques in their collection.
Captain Laurence Oates 1880–1912	"Antarctic explorer lived here"	309 Upper Richmond Road; East Sheen SW15	1973	1999		9704	A blue Greater London Council plaque erected to the Antarctic explorer Captain Laurence Oates(the spelling "Lawrence" also appears on some official documents) in 1973. The plaque was removed from 309 Upper Richmond Road, East Sheen, SW15, prior to its demolition in 1999. The whereabouts of the plaque were unknown for a time though it was thought likely to be in the possession of English Heritage This was revealed to be the case in April 2024 when English Heritage released a short film about the plaques in their Wrest Park archive, in which the Oates plaque can be seen.
George Odger 1820–1877	"Labour Leader lived and died here"	18 St Giles High Street; Holborn WC2H	1949	1961		7586	The London County Council erected a blue glazed ware plaque to the pioneer trade unionist and radical politician George Odger at 18 St Giles High Street, Holborn in 1949. The house was demolished to make way for the Centre Point office block in 1961, the plaque recovered intact by the LCC and subsequently donated to the Trades Union Congress. It was installed on an interior wall of St Giles in the Fields in 1974.
Sir Robert Peel 1788–1850	"Statesman Died Here"	4 Whitehall Gardens; Westminster SW1	1904	1938			The London County Council erected a blue encaustic ware plaque to the statesman, and father of modern British policing, Sir Robert Peel at No.4 Whitehall Gardens on 6 June 1904. All the houses in Whitehall Gardens were demolished in 1938 to make way for the construction of the new offices of the Board of Trade and Air Ministry. Peel was commemorated by the scheme again when a plaque recording his residence at 16 Upper Grosvenor Street, Mayfair (jointly with his father, Sir Robert Peel 1750–1830) was placed by English Heritage in 1988. In April 2024 the 1904 plaque was revealed as one of the items in English Heritage's Wrest Park archive, being shown in their short film about the 'orphan' plaques in their collection.
Sir Joshua Reynolds 1723–1792	"Lived here. Sir Joshua Reynolds, P.R.A Painter Born 1723. Died 1792."	47 Leicester Square; Westminster WC2	1869	1937			Reynolds was one of the first four recipients of a memorial from the official London-wide scheme, a plaque of blue encaustic ware being erected by the Society of Arts at his townhouse in Leicester Square – then No.47 Leicester Fields – in 1869, two years after the first. The plaque was removed when the house was demolished to make way for Fanum House, the new headquarters of The Automobile Association, in 1937. A new plaque, one of the LCCs experimental series of brown plaques and arguably a direct replacement for the original, was installed in 1947. This was removed in 1957 when work to extend Fanum House began, and re-affixed at first-floor level in 1960. The AA added an enamelled steel plaque duplicating the wording of the LCCs at street level in 1965. The building at 48 Leicester Square, subsequently renamed Communications House, was extensively reconstructed and reconfigured in 2016, neither plaque being disturbed in the process. In April 2024 the 1869 plaque was revealed as one of the oldest items in English Heritage's Wrest Park archive, being shown in their short film about the 'orphan' plaques in their collection. When first erected, the plaque was affixed to a wooden mount similar to that of the earliest surviving plaque in the scheme, to Napoleon III in King Street, St. James's. It is embossed on the reverse with the makers name – Minton & Co, Stoke upon Trent.
Mrs. Siddons 1755–1831	"Actress. Lived here"	17 York Place; Baker Street W1U	1876	c1965			The first plaque in the London scheme commemorating a woman was erected by the Society of Arts to honour the actress Sarah Siddons at 17, York Place, Baker Street or No.27 Upper Baker Street – sources differ – in 1876. It was removed during demolition work to make way for an extension to the Metropolitan Railway's Baker Street station in 1905. The Metropolitan Railway Company offered to reinstate the plaque on the new building but the LCC felt this would create a false impression and proposed that it be re-erected on another of Siddons' residences, 54 Great Marlborough Street or, alternatively, placed on the new building but with a supplementary plaque making it clear that the house was not original. The latter suggestion was adopted and on 19 December 1905 the SOA plaque was affixed to the new building, 226 Baker Street, beneath which was attached a smaller rectangular plaque with the wording "Tablet fixed 1876: Premises rebuilt and tablet refixed 1905". The plaque was still listed as in-situ by the LCC in 1960. No.226 Baker Street was demolished in 1965, the plaque was rescued and given to the now defunct Theatre Museum (part of the Victoria and Albert Museum) by the LCC. The plaque remains in the possession of the V&A but is not currently on display, nor is it one of the objects available to view at the V&A East storehouse. The LCC would later – in June 1907 – erect its own memorial to Siddons at 54 Great Marlborough Street, the plaque believed lost when that house was demolished in 1958. Remarkably, the LCC's supplementary tablet from 1905 also survives – now in the possession of English Heritage – being glimpsed briefly in a short film about some of the 'orphaned' plaques in their Wrest Park archive, released in April 2024.
Thomas Telford 1757–1834	"Engineer Lived Here"	24 Abingdon Street; Westminster SW1	1935	1959		72706	The London County Council erected a blue glazed ware plaque to the engineer Thomas Telford at 24 Abingdon Street, Westminster on 20 March 1935. The house was later used as the office of the National Association of Local Government Officers. Abingdon Street was bombed during the 1939–45 war and would remain derelict until the early 1960s. Telford's plaque was recovered by the LCC in 1959, and donated to the Institution of Civil Engineers (ICE) – appropriately, since it had been Telford who founded the institution in 1818, and was its first president. Since 1980, the plaque has been displayed in the reception area of the ICE at 1 Great George Street, being unveiled by HRH The Duke of Gloucester in September of that year. The remaining derelict houses in Abingdon Street were demolished in 1963-4 and a two-storey underground car park subsequently built on the cleared site. College Green public park was created on the roof of the car park.
Joseph M. W. Turner 1775–1851	"Artist. Was born here 1775. Died 1851."	26 Maiden Lane (never erected); Covent Garden	n/a	n/a		72837	An English Heritage campaign asking the public to help locate some of the plaques lost in the 150-plus year history of the official London scheme resulted in this memorial to J.M.W. Turner resurfacing in 2024. A curiosity, it is not (unlike the other 35 known plaques put up by the Society of Arts between 1867 and 1901) documented in the Journal of the Society and it seems it was never officially erected. It is believed to have been manufactured at the turn of the twentieth century (just as the SOA were, by mutual agreement, transferring their scheme to the London County Council) and intended for No. 26 Maiden Lane (on the north side). A house on this site until the 1870s was for many years believed to have been Turner's birthplace; (Note: A. J. Finberg, researching his scholarly biography of Turner (published in 1939) established that Turner had in fact been born at No. 21 Maiden Lane (south side) but lived at No. 26 later – now generally accepted to have been from 1776 to 1799, Turner's father most probably being a sub-tenant until his name reappears in the Poor Rate record from March 1795. No. 21 appears to have been demolished in the 1870s and the building that replaced it was destroyed in a 1944 air raid, the site remaining vacant for around 40 years.) it appears that some problem arose – perhaps with the building, perhaps with the Bedford Estate – that prevented the plaque from being fixed there. In April 1980 the plaque was the subject of an article by Al Weil in Turner Society News which told how Mr Paul Fessler, then managing director of Displaywork Limited, recalled seeing it in the early 1950s in his father's firm's offices at 12/13 Henrietta Street (very close to Maiden Lane) and, how he rescued it from a pile of rubble when it was removed in 1974 during remodelling work. Hopes expressed in the article that the plaque would be affixed to a building never materialised but in 1999 the Turner Society collaborated with Westminster City Council to have one of their green plaques made and erected on the current building that is No. 21, on the site of Turner's birth house. At some point the SOA plaque found its way into the Westminster Archives. Following the renewed interest, The Turner Society and Westminster City Council agreed to loan the plaque to The Porterhouse, a public house on the site of 21 Maiden Lane. The plaque was unveiled at an event held in the "Mr. Turners Bar" section of the Porterhouse on 4th March 2026. (Note: The creator of this page is indebted to Dr Pieter van der Merwe, MBE, DL, chairman of The Turner Society, for his authorship of and contribution to the section of this page covering the Society of Arts memorial to J.M.W. Turner.)
George Frederick Watts O.M., R.A., 1817–1904	"Painter Lived and died here"	New Little Holland House, 6 Melbury Road; Holland Park W14 8LN	1925	1964			The London County Council erected a plaque of glazed ware to commemorate the artist, member of the Holland Park Circle and creator of the Memorial to Heroic Self-Sacrifice in Postman's Park, George Frederic Watts at New Little Holland House, 6 Melbury Road, Holland Park, on 7 July 1925. This was one of a run of seven plaques made for the LCC between 1925 and 1926 by Doulton in the 'Della Robbia' style, featuring a colourful raised wreath surround, five of which survive as part of the scheme. New Little Holland House, built in 1875-6, was designed for Watts by Frederick Pepys Cockerell with a gallery extension by George Aitchison added in 1878. The house was demolished in 1964 after failed attempts by the London County Council to place a building preservation order on it. In its place was built a block of flats named Kingfisher House, in 1965. In April 2024 the plaque was revealed as one of the items in English Heritage's Wrest Park archive, being discussed in their second short film about the 'orphan' plaques in their collection.

== Plaques relocated ==
This section records plaques which were recovered after the loss of the building to which they were originally affixed and rehung by the custodians of the scheme at another, authentic former London residence. These plaques are not 'lost' and remain within the official London plaque scheme – it is the houses to which they were originally affixed that are lost. This section also covers the sole instance of a plaque being relocated to rectify a mistake.

Subject	Inscription	Location	Year installed	Year removed	Photo	Open Plaques ref	Notes
Richard Dadd 1817–1886	"Painter lived here"	16 Suffolk Street; Westminster W2 2PS	1977	1980		331	The Greater London Council erected a plaque of blue glazed ware at No.16 Suffolk Street to commemorate the artist Richard Dadd in 1977. The address was subsequently discovered to be incorrect – the wholesale mid-20th century rebuilding of no.15-17 Suffolk Street in a neo-Regency style having caused the confusion – and it was moved to its present location, the adjacent No.15, in 1980.
Essex Street 1817-1886	"Essex Street was laid out in the grounds of Essex House by Nicholas Barbon in 1675 Among many famous lawyers who lived here were Sir Orlando Bridgeman c.1606–1674 Lord Keeper Henry Fielding 1707–1754 Novelist and Brass Crosby 1725–1793 Lord Mayor of London James Savage 1779–1852 Architect had his office here. Prince Charles Edward Stuart stayed at a house in the street in 1750. Rev. Theophilus Lindsey 1723–1808 Unitarian Minister founded Essex Street Chapel here in 1774. Dr. Samuel Johnson established an evening club at the Essex Head in 1783"	7 Essex Street, Strand; Westminster WC2	1962	1963		625	On 2 August 1961 the London County Council erected a plaque to commemorate its historical associations of Essex Street, on the south flanking wall of No.7. The idea for this memorial had begun as a 1957 suggestion that something might be erected in Essex Street to commemorate the visit of Prince Charles Edward Stuart to London in 1750, it being decided that a plaque giving a brief history of the street would be more appropriate. After consideration was given to a large rectangular plaque of glazed ware, it was decided to commission a tablet of Portland Stone, dimensions 36 x 24 inches (915mm x 610mm), with the Council's crest and the inscription incised and gilded. Within four months of the erection of this plaque – on 30 November 1961 – the Council gave permission for the redevelopment of the site including No.7 Essex Street. The memorial was removed by the Council and placed into store in May 1963 prior to the demolition of the building that it had authorised. In April 1964 the Council decided on a new site for the plaque at the north end of Essex Street, on the wall of Essex Hall. The plaque was duly re-erected on 20 September 1964.
William Ewart 1798–1869	"Reformer lived here"	6 Cambridge Square; Tyburnia W2 2PS	1952	1962		298	The plaque to reformer William Ewart, the British liberal politician who in 1863 conceived the idea of commemorative plaques to celebrate the link between a location and a famous person or event – an idea which subsequently led to the creation of the London plaque scheme in 1866 – was erected by London County Council in 1952. The plaque was recovered by the LCC prior to the demolition of 6 Cambridge Square in 1962 and rehung at 16 Eaton Place, Belgravia SW1 in August 1963.
Captain Matthew Flinders R.N. 1774–1814	"Explorer and Navigator Lived Here"	53 Stanhope Street; St Pancras NW1 3LD	1961	1965		484	The London County Council erected a plaque of blue glazed ware to commemorate Captain Matthew Flinders, navigator and cartographer, who between 1795 and 1803 led the first inshore circumnavigation of mainland Australia, at 53 Stanhope Street (in Flinders' time, 7 Mary Street) in 1961. The plaque was recovered when the building was demolished in 1965, and rehung under the auspices of the Greater London Council in 1973 at 56 Fitzroy Street, much altered since Flinders' lifetime but now the only one of his London residences to survive.
Charles James Fox 1749–1806	"Statesman Lived Here"	9 Arlington Street; Mayfair SW1	1912	1940s		402	A plaque of blue encaustic ware commemorating Whig politician and arch-rival to William Pitt the Younger Charles James Fox was erected by the London County Council on 22nd July 1912 at 9 Arlington Street. The plaque had been approved on 26th October 1909 but, after it had been made, the occupier strongly objected to the initials 'LCC' on the plaque and it was only after these had been masked by a piece of blue glass that it was deemed acceptable; it is in this form that the plaque is illustrated in the fourth volume of 'Indication of Houses of Historical Interest in London'. The house was pulled down in the 1940s and the plaque retrieved; the LCC, having identified Holland House in Kensington (which had been largely destroyed by German firebombing during the Blitz in 1940) and 46 Clarges Street in Mayfair as surviving residences elected to rehang the plaque at the latter address, where Fox had lived for a short period in 1803. The plaque, refurbished and with the glass covering the 'LCC' initials removed, was affixed to 46 Clarges Street in 1950.
W. G. Grace 1848–1915	"Cricketer Lived Here"	7 Lawrie Park Road; Sydenham SE26 6DR	1963	1964		1430	The London County Council erected a plaque of blue glazed ware to commemorate the cricketer W. G. Grace at 7 Lawrie Park Road, where he lived from 1898 to 1909, in 1963 but the house was demolished the following year. The plaque was salvaged and, in 1966, rehung at Grace's last residence, a detached villa named 'Fairmount' in Mottingham, SE9 by the LCC's successor, the Greater London Council. Mottingham is historically part of Kent and was not absorbed into London – as part of the London Borough of Bromley – until 1st April 1965. This has created a curiosity; Grace's plaque now adorns a house which resides beyond the physical boundary of the authority that created it.
The Great Eastern 1848–1915	"THE GREAT EASTERN (launched 1858) largest steamship of the century was built here by I.K. Brunel and J.Scott Russell"	Boundary wall between Burrells Wharf and Napier Wharf; Isle of Dogs E14	1954	1974		24148	The London County Council erected a plaque of blue glazed ware to commemorate the steam ship 'SS Great Eastern', the largest steam powered vessel of the 19th century, conceived and designed by Isambard Kingdom Brunel and built by John Scott Russell & Co. at Millwall Iron Works on the Isle of Dogs, at a boundary wall between the two shipyards where she was constructed between May 1854 and August 1859, in 1954. The plaque was removed for safekeeping in 1974 prior to the demolition of the sheds to the north of the site. It remained in storage for 17 years, being rehung at its present location on the West Ferry Road (following the conversion of some of Burrells Wharf to housing) by English Heritage in 1992.
Sir Rowland Hill, K.C.B. 1871–1960	"originator of the Penny Post, lived here in 1849–1879. Born 1795. Died 1879."	1) Bartram House, Hampstead NW3; 2) Hampstead General Hospital, Hampstead NW3; 3) Royal Free Hospital, Pond Street, Hampstead, NW3	1900	1) 1905 2) 1975 3) 2018		685	The Society of Arts erected a plaque of terracotta encaustic ware at Bartram House, Hampstead, the former residence of Sir Rowland Hill, the reformer of the Royal Mail whose proposals led to the introduction of the Uniform Penny Post in 1840, in 1893. This Georgian house was demolished in 1905 to make way for the expansion of Hampstead General Hospital. The plaque was rehung by the hospital authorities in the hospital grounds and remained there until 1975 when these buildings were demolished to make way for the expanding Royal Free Hospital, which had opened in 1974. In 1978 the plaque was rehung again on the retaining wall of a car park in the hospital grounds. It was removed again when construction of the Royal Free's Pears Building on that site began in 2018 and rehung for a third time in a public garden space accessible via Rowland Hill Street on 24th February 2022.
Lilian Lindsay 1871–1960	"The first woman dentist to qualify in Britain lived here"	3 Hungerford Road; Islington N7 9LA	2013	2017		30375	English Heritage erected a plaque of blue glazed ware to commemorate the former residence of Lilian Lindsay, the first British woman to qualify as a dentist, at 3 Hungerford Road, Islington on 17th April 2013. The building was unlawfully demolished in November 2017. The plaque was salvaged and rehung by English Heritage in 2019 at 23 Russell Square, the former headquarters of the British Dental Association and the site of the flat where Lindsay and her husband Robert moved after retiring from dental practice in 1920.
Tom Moore 1779–1852	"Poet Lived Here"	28 Bury Street; Westminster SW1Y 6NP	1953	1962		9151	The London County Council erected a plaque of blue glazed ware to commemorate the former residence of Irish poet Thomas Moore at 28 Bury Street, Westminster in 1953. The plaque was removed when the house was demolished in 1962. It was rehung by the LCC at 85 (formerly 44) George Street, Marylebone in 1963 and unveiled by the Irish Ambassador Con Cremin.
Mary Seacole 1805-1881	"Jamaican Nurse heroine of the Crimean War lived here"	157 George Street; Paddington W1H 5LB	1985	1998		604	The Greater London Council erected a plaque of blue glazed ware to commemorate the residence of the Jamaican nurse and businesswoman Mary Seacole at 157 George Street, Paddington in 1985. The plaque was retrieved by English Heritage prior to demolition in 1998 and rehung at 14 Soho Square, where Seacole lodged in early 1857, in 2007.
W. H. Smith 1825–1891	"Bookseller and statesman lived here"	3 Grosvenor Place; Belgravia SW1W 0QH	1961	1964		315	The London County Council erected a plaque of blue glazed ware to commemorate the residence of bookseller and newsagent, later Member of Parliament, William Henry Smith at 3 Grosvenor Place, Westminster in 1961. Smith had lived here for the last nine years of his life, a period in which he served as First Lord of the Treasury and Leader of the House of Commons. The building was redeveloped three years later. The recovered plaque was rehung at 12 (formerly No.1) Hyde Park Street in 1966 by the Greater London Council.
Charles Haddon Spurgeon 1834–92	"Preacher Lived Here"	1) 75 Great Dover Street, Southwark SE1 4YF; 2) 217 New Kent Road Southwark SE1 4YS	1914	1) 1953 2) 1968		124	The London County Council erected a bronze tablet in their short-lived 'medallion' style to commemorate Particular Baptist preacher Charles Spurgeon's residence at 75 Great Dover Street, Southwark on 18th September 1914. This house was demolished in 1953, the plaque being rehung at 217 New Kent Road (formerly 3 Bengal Place), where Spurgeon had lived in 1856-7, the following year. The plaque was salvaged for a second time prior to the demolition of this former Spurgeon residence in 1969. It was rehung at its present location, 99 Nightingale Lane, Balham, in 1971. This house, formerly Helensburgh House, was built by Spurgeon in 1869 on the site of an earlier property he had moved to (from 217 New Kent Road) in 1857. This building, as Queen Elizabeth House. would become part of the South London Hospital for Women and Children during the 1939–45 war.
Robert Stephenson 1803–1859	"Engineer died here"	34 Gloucester Square; Tyburnia W2 2DT	1905	1936		643	The London County Council erected a plaque of terra cotta encaustic ware to commemorate the residence at 34 Gloucester Square of the civil engineer and designer of locomotives Robert Stephenson on 14th August 1905, one of a number of memorials suggested to the LCC by the Society of Arts as the former took over the official London plaque scheme from the latter. Stephenson had moved to No.34 Gloucester Square in 1847, the year of his election to Parliament as the MP for Whitby. This house was demolished in 1936, the plaque – not suitable for re-siting at an alternative address, should one have been found, due to it recording the location of Stephenson's death – being rehung the following year on the replacement building, now numbered No.35. A supplementary tablet of dark brown glazed ware, placed beneath the plaque at the time of its reinstallation, records this history. This was the last time a supplementary plaque of this sort would be used; the LCC decided to end the practice in 1938.
Sir John Tenniel 1820–1914	"Artist and Cartoonist, Lived here."	10 Portsdown Road; Maida Vale W9 1BP	1930	1959		78599	The London County Council erected a light green (in deference to the wishes of the then occupant, a Mrs Burgess) glazed ware plaque to the illustrator, graphic humourist and political cartoonist Sir John Tenniel, most famous as the illustrator of Lewis Carroll's 'Alice' books, at No.10 Portsdown Road, Maida Vale on 12th March 1930. Portsdown Road was renamed Randolph Avenue in 1939. The house was demolished in 1959. In April 2024 the plaque was revealed as one of the items in English Heritage's Wrest Park archive and was discussed in their short film about the 'orphan' plaques in their collection. Recent research had unearthed a number of alternative residences for Tenniel – one of them in Randolph Avenue – and serious consideration was being given to re-erecting this plaque at one of them This, remarkably, came to pass in November 2025; the restored plaque has re-joined the official London plaque scheme, being re-hung at Tenniel's former Fitz-George Avenue residence on 13 November 2025, sixty five years since it last saw the light of day.

== Non-scheme plaques ==
This section records plaques which have never formed part of the official London-wide plaque scheme but, bearing the name of one of the custodians of the scheme, are included for the sake of completeness.

Subject	Inscription	Location	Year installed	Photo	Open Plaques ref	Notes
Becontree Estate	"This block of houses was the first to be erected on this estate and was completed on 7 November 1921"	22–28 Chitty's Lane; Dagenham RM8 1UP			9800	The Housing Act 1919 permitted the London County Council to build housing outside the County of London and Becontree was constructed between 1921 and 1935 to cottage estate principles in the parishes of Barking, Dagenham and Ilford, then in Essex. This commemorative plaque on the first house built was installed by the LCC at some point after WWII and before the council's abolition in 1965. As the location was not part of London at the time of its installation, the plaque was never intended to form part of the then-LCC administered official London Plaque scheme. Although boundary changes which occurred at the time of the formation of the Greater London Council in 1965 placed the estate in the London Borough of Barking and Dagenham, neither the GLC nor English Heritage have chosen to include the plaque in the official list. The plaque design, superficially reminiscent of the small number of other rectangular plaques erected by the LCC in the late 1940s-early 1950s, is uniquely formed of two glazed ceramic panels.
Antonio Giovanni Canaletto 1697–1768	"artist worked from a studio on this site 1746 – 1755"	10 Howley Place; Maida Vale W2 1XA			3788	Despite appearances to the contrary, this plaque was not authorised by the London County Council, and English Heritage have on several occasions asked the building's owners to remove it. Canaletto never had a studio on this site; the location was an open field during his time in London, and there is no evidence that he had any other London address besides 41 Beak Street, Soho. The origin of the plaque itself, which is indistinguishable from genuine LCC examples of the 1960–65 period, is unknown. A genuine English Heritage plaque commemorating Lokamanya Tilak is affixed to the same building in a less prominent position.
Andrew Marvell 1621–1678	"Four feet below this spot is the stone step, formerly the entrance to the cottage in which lived Andrew Marvell, poet, wit and satirist. Colleague with John Milton in the foreign or Latin secretaryship during the Commonwealth; and for about twenty years MP for Hull. Born at Winstead Yorkshire, 31 March 1621. Died in London, 18 August 1678 and buried in the Church of St Giles-In-The-Fields"	Boundary wall of Waterlow Park, Highgate Hill; Highgate N6 5HE	1898		9240	This plaque, erected by the London County Council in 1898, predates their stewardship of the London-wide plaque scheme by three years. The only one of its type, it has never been incorporated into the official scheme.
