= Kate Norgate =

British historian

Kate Norgate (8 December 1853 – 17 April 1935) was a British historian. She was one of the first women to achieve academic success in this sphere, and is best known for her history of England under the Angevin kings and for coining the name Angevin Empire to describe their domains. She was self-educated in the Victorian era when higher education was generally denied to women. Her obituary in The Times described her as "the most learned woman historian of the pre-academic period."

== Early life ==
Norgate was the only child of bookseller Frederic Norgate (1817–1908), a partner in Messrs Williams and Norgate, and Fanny, daughter of John Athow, a stonemason and surveyor. Her paternal grandfather was the journalist and writer Thomas Starling Norgate, through whom she came into contact with a group of writers operating in Norwich. She became a friend of the historians John Richard Green and his wife Alice Stopford Green, who were particularly influential on her development. When J. R. Green died, Norgate helped his widow in editing much of his work.

== Career ==
Norgate spent fifteen years in producing her first work, England under the Angevin Kings (1887) which was regarded as authoritative. Later writing included John Lackland (1902), and Richard the Lion Heart (1924). Although her writing was popular with the public, scholars were increasingly critical of a lack of reference to primary sources.

Norgate contributed 44 entries to the Dictionary of National Biography. In 1929 she was elected an honorary fellow of Somerville College, Oxford, "belated recognition" in the face of having outlived most of her contemporaries and her popularity, dying largely forgotten.

Kate Norgate never married; she lived at Jasmine Cottage, 2 Church Lane, Gorleston-on-Sea, near Great Yarmouth, Norfolk, from 1921 until her death in 1935. On 13 April 2024 a blue plaque was installed on her former home (now known as 58 Church Lane following re-numbering in c.1937) by the Great Yarmouth Local History & Archaeological Society.

== Works ==
- Kate Norgate England under the Angevin Kings, In Two Volumes- Originally Published: London (1887).
- J.R. Green, M. A. Edited by Mrs. J.R. Green and Miss Kate Norgate. Green's "Short History," Illustrated; A Short History Of The English People. In four volumes. New-York: Harper & Brothers. (1895).
- Kate Norgate, The Alleged Condemnation of King John by the Court of France in 1202 Transactions of the Royal Historical Society, New Series, Vol. 14, (1900), pp. 53–67
- Kate Norgate, John Lackland (1902) Macmillan (See John, King of England.)
- Kate Norgate, The Minority of Henry the Third (1912)
- Kate Norgate, Richard the Lion Heart (1924).
- Kate Norgate, Philip of France Wins the French Domains of the English Kings (1202–1204) Research paper(1912).
