= Kozma Soldatyonkov =

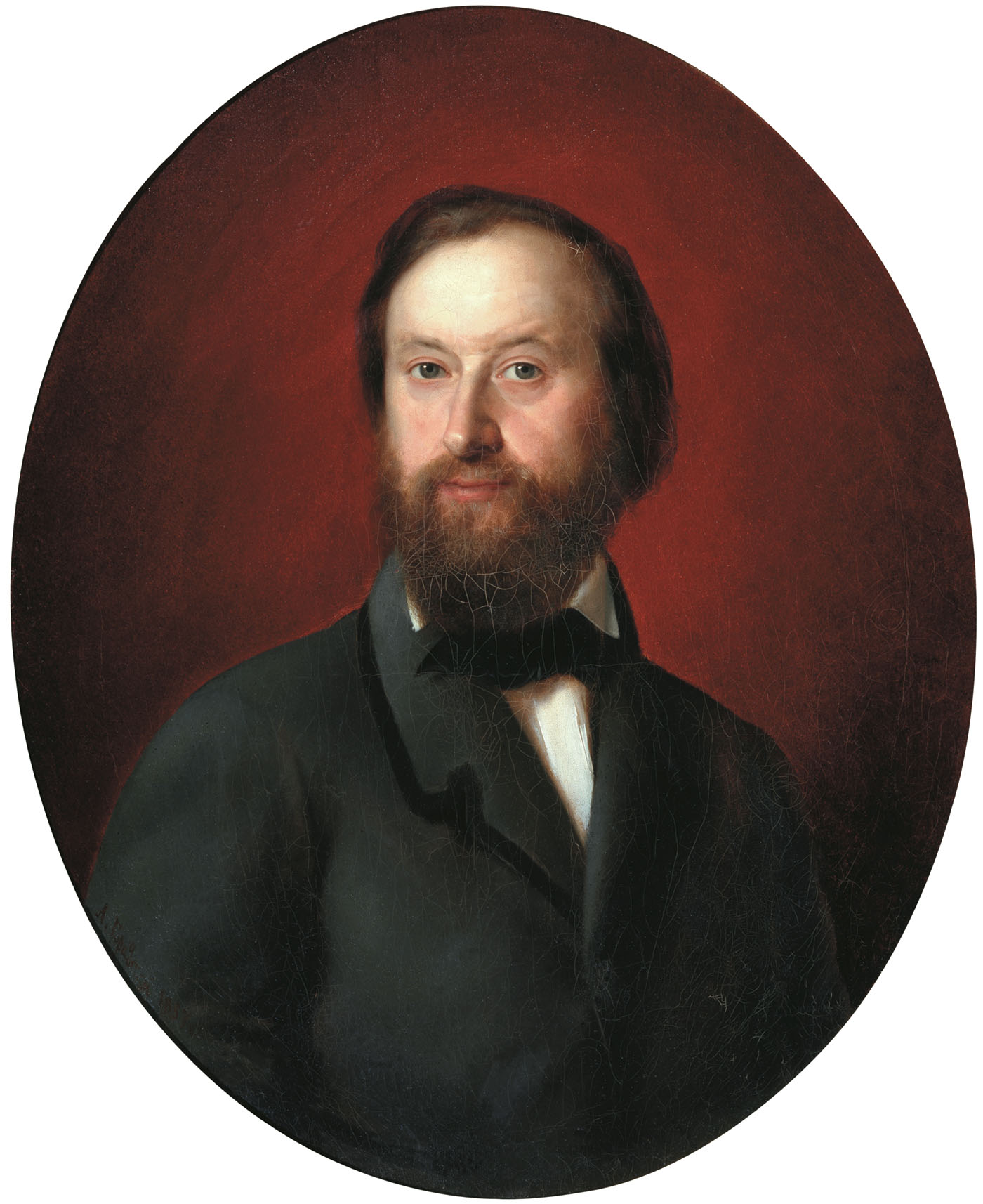
- Portrait by Apollinary Goravsky
- Born: October 22, 1818; Moscow, Russian Empire
- Died: June 1, 1901 (aged 82); Kuntsevo, Russian Empire
- Occupation: publisher • industrialist • art collector

Kozma Terentyevich Soldatyonkov (Russian: Козьма Терентьевич Солдатёнков; 22 October 1818 in Moscow, Russian Empire – 1 June 1901 in Kuntsevo, Moscow, Russian Empire) was a Russian industrialist, mecenate, philanthropist, art collector and a renowned publisher.

In 1865 the Soldatyonkov Publishing house was launched. Among its seminal publications were the Complete Works by Vissarion Belinsky and Konstantin Kavelin, Russian Fairytales by Alexander Afanasyev, the translations of Allgemeine Weltgeschichte by Georg Weber, The American Commonwealth by James Bryce, The History of the Decline and Fall of the Roman Empire by Edward Gibbon, The History of Scandinavian Literature by Frederik Horn (translated by Konstantin Balmont), A Short History of the English People by John Richard Green and History of Rome by Theodor Mommsen, as well as 11 issues of the Economist's Library (edited by Mitrofan Shchepkin) featuring books by Adam Smith, David Ricardo, James Mill and others.

A staunch Old Believer, he supported the Moscow Belokrinitskaya Hierarchy and financed its leader Bishop Pafnuty (Ovchinnikov)'s visit to London where he had talks with Alexander Hertsen, Nikolai Ogaryov and Vasily Kelsiyev.

Soldatyonkov bequeathed his library (8 thousand books and 15 thousand journals) and art collection (258 paintings, including the best known works by Karl Bryullov, Alexander Ivanov, Vasily Perov and Pavel Fedotov, as well as 17 sculptures) to the Rumyantsev Museum. After 1924 they were shared between the Tretyakov Gallery and the Russian Museum. Part of Soldatyonkov's capital (2 million rubles) went, according to his will, to the construction of the hospital for the poor, later to be known as the Botkin Clinic.

Vassily Soldatenkov was his great-nephew.
