= Soldatenkov =

Soldatenkov is a Russian surname. Notable people with the surname include:

- Aleksandr Soldatenkov (b. 1996), Russian international footballer
- Vassily Soldatenkov (1879–1944), Russian special envoy and race car driver
