= Thomas George Crippen =

British minister and librarian

- Born: 1841; London
- Died: 1929; Nunhead
- Occupation: Cleric, librarian

Thomas George Crippen (2 November 1841–13 December 1929), a descendant of an old Huguenot family long resident in Canterbury, was born in London in 1841, and educated for the Congregational Ministry at Airedale College, Bradford, Yorkshire. His first pastorate was at Boston Spa, Yorkshire, 1866, and then at Milverton, Somerset, 1891. Crippen published in 1868 translations of Ancient Hymns and Poems. Two of his original hymns are in the Congregational Church Hymnal, 1887:— "Lord Jesu Christ, by Whom alone" (Election of Deacons), and "O God, Who boldest in Thy hand" (Before a Parliamentary Election). The first of these was written specially for that Hymnal. His metrical rendering of one of Rodwell's prose translations of Jared's Abyssinian hymns was printed in the Oldbury Weekly Times, circa 1880, and subsequently as a broadsheet. It begins "To Christ, uprising from the dead be sung." His Popular Introduction to the History of Christian Doctrine was published in 1883. In 1896 Crippen was appointed Librarian at the Congregational Hall, Farringdon Street, London. In addition to his Ancient Hymns and Poems, Translated from the Latin, 1869, he has contributed numerous hymns to various periodicals, especially the Evangelical Magazine. His hymn "O Thou Who givest corn and wine" was written for Band of Hope gatherings in 1885, and first printed in the Sunday School Chronicle. It is in the Sunday School Hymnary, 1905, and others.
