= Congregational Memorial Hall =

Former building in the City of London

Coordinates: 51.5150°N 0.1042°W

The hall in 1879 when photographed for a lantern slide by York and Son

The Congregational Memorial Hall in Farringdon Street, London was built to commemorate the 200th anniversary of Great Ejection of Black Bartholomew's Day, resulting from the 1662 Act of Uniformity which restored the Anglican church. The two thousand puritan ministers who refused to take the oath of conformity thereby established non-conformism.

The architect of the hall was John Tarring.

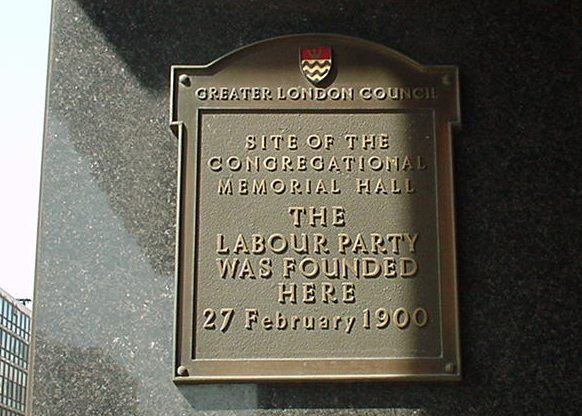
The plaque at Caroone House, recording the foundation of the Labour Party

The hall was built upon the site of the Fleet Prison in Farringdon Street. It opened in 1875 and served as a meeting place and home for the Congregational Library. Other progressive organisations met there including the Labour Party which was founded at a meeting there on 27 February 1900 initially under the name of the Labour Representation Committee.

The hall was demolished in 1968 and Caroone House was built on the site — an office which was used by British Telecom for its international business and telephone tapping.

In 1978 the Congregational Memorial Hall Trust was established to handle income from Caroone House and then from the capital raised from its sale. The income is used to maintain the Congregational Library (housed at Dr Williams's Library from 1982 to 2022 and now at Westminster College, Cambridge) and give grants to the three bodies represented on the trust, the United Reformed Church, the Congregational Federation, the Evangelical Fellowship of Congregational Churches, and the Unaffiliated Congregational Churches Charities.

== See also ==
- Memorial Hall, Manchester
