= Vassily Soldatenkov =

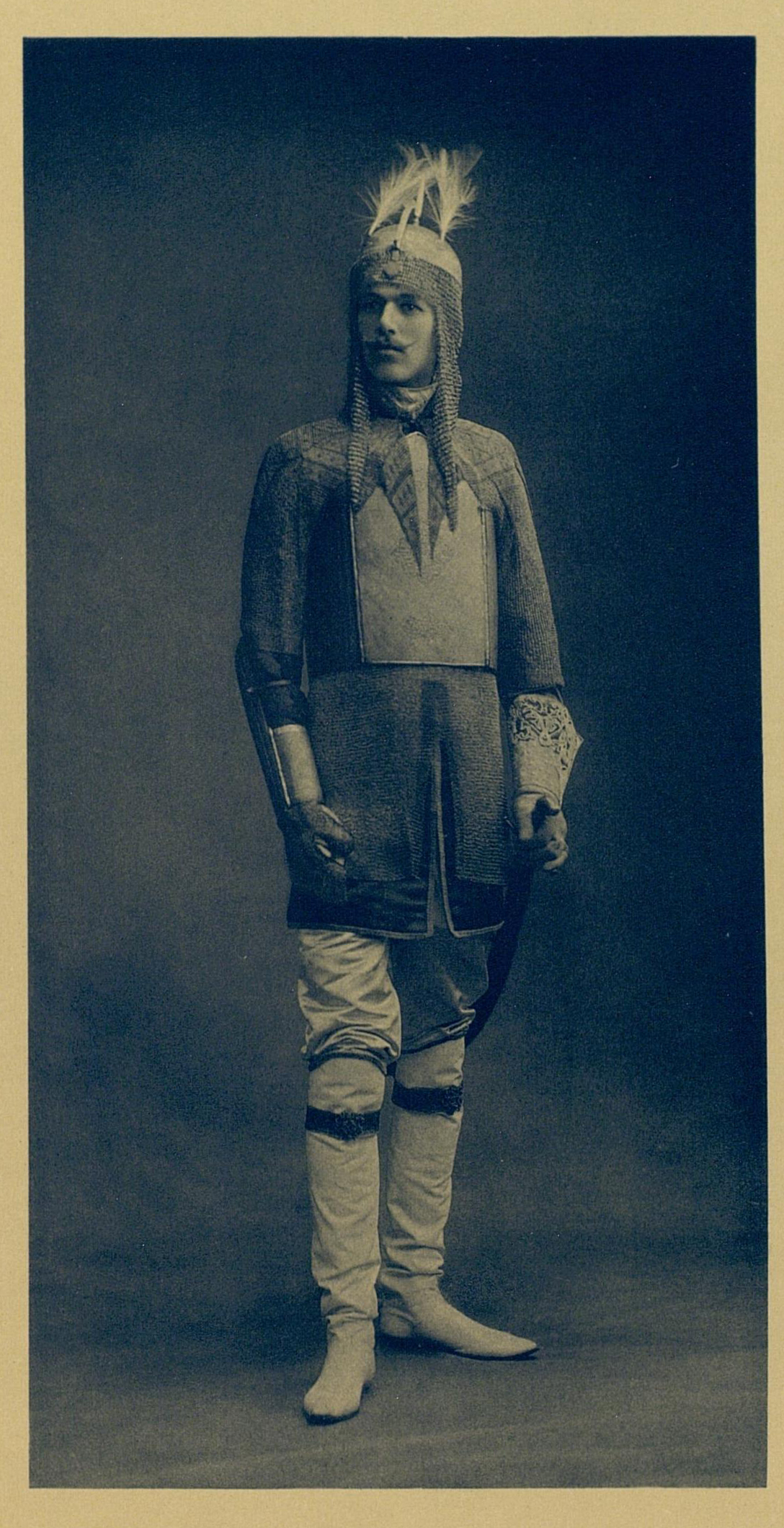

Personal information
- Full name: Vasily Vasilyevich Soldatenkov
- Nationality: Russian
- Born: 14 July 1879 Moscow
- Died: 31 July 1944 (aged 65) Italy

Sport
- Country: Russia
- Sport: Chess and Auto racing

Vasily Vasilyevich Soldatenkov, (Russian: Солдатёнков, Василий Васильевич; July 14, 1879 – July 31, 1944) more commonly known as Vassily Soldatenkov, was a Russian special envoy, chess player and race car driver.

== Information ==
=== Background ===
He was born into the Soldatenkov family, in 1879 which was a noble merchant family of Moscow, Russia. His father was Vasily Soldatenkov, who worked for the Ministry of Internal Affairs of the Russian Empire. His great uncle was Kozma Soldatyonkov, a businessman, textile manufacturer, inventor and book publisher.

=== Racing ===
As a child, he was interested in motorsports and chess. He spent most of his early life in Italy. He began participating in motorsports by at least 1904 and became the first Russian to ever go past 101km/h in car named, "Lina". The car was named after the Italian singer, Lina Cavalieri, who he had a romantic relationship with. He won a 5km race in Verona in 1907 and competed in the 1911 Targa Florio, where he came in third. During the race, he came down with a serious case of ophthalmia. He joined the Imperial Russian Automobile Society in 1912 and became a special envoy for Russia.

=== Chess ===
Soldatenkov was also known for his chess skills. He had defeated chess champion Frank Marshall and was credited with helping to develop the Marshall Attack.

=== Post racing career ===
Soldatenkov moved to Italy after the 1917 October Revolution. He was once married to Princess Elena Gorchakov of Russia, but the couple divorced in November 1919. He married Madelaine Reece on March 16, 1920. She was the niece of Martin Voel (Assistant Chief Treasurer of the United States), but the couple divorced in 1928. Soldatenkov died in Italy in 1944.
