= Caroone House =

London office building (1972–2004)

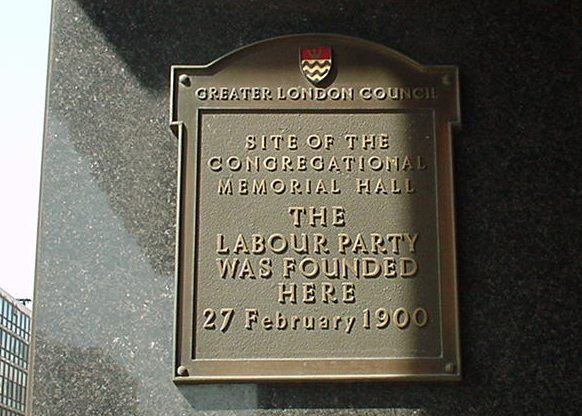
- Labour Party Plaque at the entrance to Caroone House (2004)
- Interactive map of the Caroone House area

General information
- Type: Telephone exchange
- Location: 14 Farringdon Street, London, EC4; United Kingdom
- Coordinates: 51.5156°N 0.1041°W
- Completed: 1972
- Demolished: 2004
- Owner: Post Office Telecommunications

Technical details
- Floor count: 7

Caroone House was an office block at 14 Farringdon Street, London EC4, which was built in 1972 on the site of the Congregational Memorial Hall which had been demolished in 1968.

== History of Site ==
The Memorial Hall and Caroone House were built on the site of the old Fleet Prison. The prison was burnt down during the Great Fire of London and while the prison was being rebuilt, the prisoners were relocated to Caron House, South Lambeth, a large mansion house which had been built by Noel de Caron the Netherlands ambassador to England in the reigns of Elizabeth I and James I. In 1685 Caron House was demolished but the name survived and in the 19th century there was a "Carroun House" on the estate – which has been known as Vauxhall Park since 1890. As a consequence of this rich history, "Caroone House" was adopted as an appropriate name for the new building in Farringdon Street.

A Greater London Council plaque commemorating the foundation of the Labour Party at the Memorial Hall in 1900 was displayed at the main entrance to Caroone House.

== BT ==
The building was used by Post Office Telecommunications – from 1981 British Telecom (BT) – as the headquarters for its Post Office International Telephones division (designated as ITp) for operating their international business and for telephone tapping. Among other things it was the HQ for managing the operation of ITps International Control Centres (ICCs) in London, Brighton and Glasgow. It was also HQ for what was, at the time, the world's largest international telecoms exchange located on the site of the old Stag Lane Aerodrome in Edgware. The Stag Lane exchange was later superseded by BTs new international switching centre (ISC) at Mondial House.

== Closure ==
In 2001 Caroone House was purchased by The British Land Company plc for £24.5 million. The building was demolished in 2004 to be replaced by the Ludgate West development. British Land commenced construction in 2005 with completion in 2007 and today 5 Fleet Place stands on the site. The Labour Party plaque has been reinstated on the wall of the redevelopment.
