= Cadby Hall =

Complex in London

Coordinates: 51°29′42″N 0°12′45″W

Cadby Hall was a major office and factory complex in Hammersmith, London, which was the headquarters of catering company Joseph Lyons and Co. for almost a century.

== Origins ==
The name originated from Charles Cadby, a piano manufacturer, who purchased 8.5 acres (34,000 m^{2}) of land along the High Road (today named Hammersmith Road) in 1874. The location had formerly been known as the Croften Estate. Cadby allocated 1.5 acres (6,100 m^{2}) on the site for his new piano factory and showrooms, while the remaining 7 acres (28,000 m^{2}) were set aside for smaller building plots.

Cadby Hall itself was designed by Lewis Henry Isaacs and constructed using Portland stone and red Fareham bricks, with terracotta panelling above the first floor windows, and carved portraits of famous composers. Reliefs on the sides of the entrance doorway depicted scenes celebrating music and poetry. Cadby called the building the Cadby & Company Pianoforte Manufactory.

The arrangement of buildings in the complex was designed primarily to prevent the spread of fire by confining it to one building should such an incident occur.

Cadby lived for a time in what is now known as Keats House, previously owned by the poet John Keats in Hampstead. When Cadby died on 22 October 1884, the factory and all stock were sold, and subsequently a variety of businesses occupied the site between 1886 and 1893, including Kensington Co-operative Stores and the Schweppes Mineral Water Works.

== J. Lyons & Co. Ltd. ==
By 1899, the fledgling J. Lyons company had purchased property near Cadby Hall at No. 62 Hammersmith Road, and when they subsequently took over the Hall complex itself they retained the name, although the official address of the Cadby Hall complex became 66 Hammersmith Road. In time, it became one of the largest food factories in the United Kingdom, growing to cover an area of more than 13 acres (53,000 m^{2}).

As the Lyons catering business expanded, the factory complex grew outwards from the central point of the original Cadby Hall, spreading in all directions but chiefly east and west along the Hammersmith Road, with new blocks being added as new areas of production were launched, including tea, baked goods, meat and ice cream. As part of this expansion, the company purchased the St Mary's College campus that adjoined Cadby Hall in 1922 and began using the land and property when the college moved to Strawberry Hill in 1925.

Blocks were given a letter designation, with A Block being the original piano manufacturing area, which was converted into bakeries. Subsequent blocks were added to the site, and as time and production moved on throughout the 20th century, old blocks would be renovated or demolished and new ones built in their place, although the original Cadby Hall building (A Block) remained largely intact right through until the demolition of the entire complex in 1983, by which time it had become J Block.

At the peak of the Lyons operations, the stretch of land along the Hammersmith Road between Blythe Road and Brook Green became one manufacturing enclosure.

The name of Cadby Hall became so synonymous with the company that the three later overseas J. Lyons & Co. complexes in Toronto, Canada; Natal, South Africa, and Salisbury, Rhodesia (today Harare, Zimbabwe) were also named Cadby Hall.

The original Cadby Hall site in Hammersmith also earned a place in history as the birthplace of the first business computer, LEO, which Lyons developed between 1949 and 1951 to automate its clerical and administrative tasks. The Leo-1 computer room, which took up around 2,500 square feet of floor space at Cadby Hall, is the subject of a project at the Centre for Computing History to recreate it in virtual reality.

== Most famous employee ==
In 1951, after she had met Denis Thatcher and moved to Dartford, Margaret Thatcher was employed as a research chemist at Cadby Hall on emulsifying ice cream.

== Decline ==
By the late 1970s, J. Lyons & Co. began to decline as rapidly as it had expanded a century earlier, and in 1978 the company was taken over by Allied Breweries Ltd. Gradually, the Lyons infrastructure was sold off to pay for Allied's consolidation in the drinks industry, and the Cadby Hall complex was scaled down until the site was finally cleared in June 1983.

Prior to its demolition, Cadby Hall served as a location for filming of episodes of 1970s TV action dramas The Professionals and The Sweeney.
