= A Short History of the English People =

Book by John Richard Green

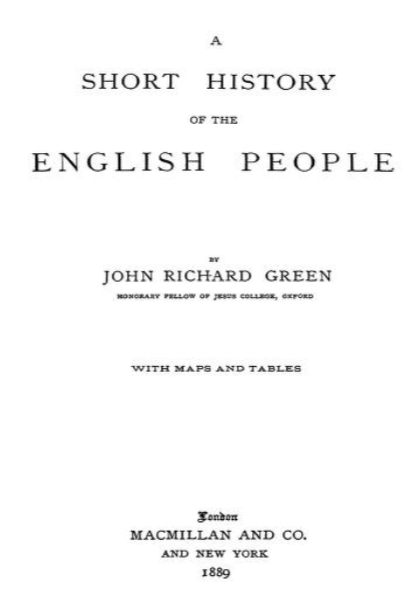
- Title page of an 1889 version
- Author: John Richard Green
- Language: English
- Genre: History
- Publisher: Macmillan and Co.
- Publication date: 1874
- Publication place: London, England, United Kingdom
- Media type: Print (Hardcover)
- Pages: 872
- OCLC: 34907370

A Short History of the English People is a book written by English historian John Richard Green. Published in 1874, "it is a history, not of English Kings or English Conquests, but of the English People."

== Background and reception ==
Green began work on the book in 1869, having been given only six months to live after being hit hard by disease that had plagued him throughout his life. Only having around 800 pages to write on, he had to leave out much of what he wanted to include. Green intentionally left out the battles of England feeling they did not play a big role in the formation of the nation, saying that historians "too often turned history into a mere record of the butchery of men by their fellow men." His new ideas, and omission of information that others felt important, meant Green was criticized by other historians as well as the people close to him.

Others thought highly of the book, including Francis Adams, who used quotations from the book in his poem The Peasants' Revolt.

== Bibliography ==
- J[ohn] R[ichard] Green (1874). A Short History of the English People. London: Macmillan and Co. OCLC 34907370.
