= John Richard Green =

English historian (1837–1883)

The Reverend John Richard Green
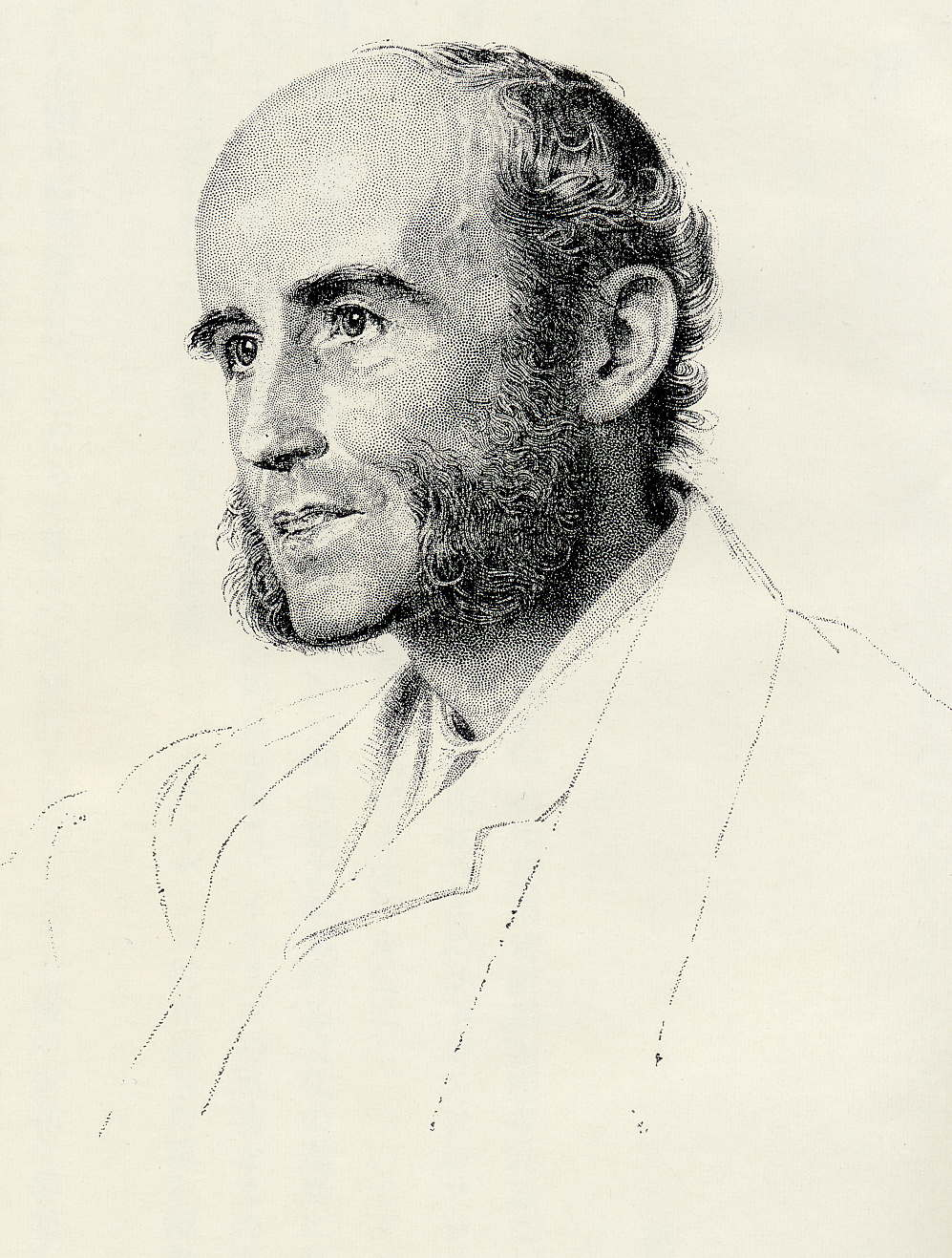
- Born: 12 December 1837; Oxford, England
- Died: 7 March 1883 (aged 45); Menton, France
- Education: Jesus College, Oxford
- Occupations: Clergyman; historian; librarian
- Years active: 1869–1883
- Notable work: A Short History of the English People (1874)
- Spouse: Alice Stopford (m. 1877)

Ecclesiastical career
- Religion: Christianity (Anglican)
- Church: Church of England
- Ordained: 1860

John Richard Green (12 December 1837 – 7 March 1883) was an English historian.

== Early life ==
Green was born on 12 December 1837, the son of a tradesman in Oxford, where he was educated, first at Magdalen College School, and then at Jesus College, Oxford, where he is commemorated by the J. R. Green Society, which meets several times a term and is run by students from the undergraduate body. He grew up in a high-church Tory family from which he rebelled as early as 1850, being "temporarily banished from his uncle's house for ridiculing the uproar over 'Papal Aggression.'"

== Career ==
=== Ecclesiastical career ===
In 1860, he entered the church and was ordained to the diaconate. He served in various curacies in London, under a constant strain caused by delicate health. Always an enthusiastic student of history, the little leisure time he had was devoted to research.

=== Turn to historical writings ===
In 1869 he finally gave up his work as a clergyman, and was appointed librarian at Lambeth. He had been laying plans for various historical works, including a History of the English Church as exhibited in a series of Lives of the Archbishops of Canterbury, and, what he proposed as his magnum opus, a history of England under the Angevin kings. After suffering from failing health he abandoned these projects and instead concentrated his energies on the preparation of his A Short History of the English People, which appeared in 1874, and at once gave him an assured place in the first rank of historical writers.

Abandoning his proposed history of the Angevins, he confined himself to expanding his Short History into A History of the English People in four volumes (1878–1880) and writing The Making of England, of which one volume only, coming down to 828, had appeared when he died at Mentone in March 1883. After his death appeared The Conquest of England. The Short History, which in 1915 was republished as part of the Everyman's Library, may be said to have begun a new epoch in the writing of history, making the social, industrial, and moral progress of the people its main theme. It sold 235,000 copies in England alone.

More recently J. W. Burrow proposed that Green, like William Stubbs and Edward Augustus Freeman, was a historical scholar with little or no experience of public affairs, with views of the present that were Romantically historicised, and who was drawn to history by what was in a broad sense an antiquarian passion for the past, as well as a patriotic and populist impulse to identify the nation and its institutions as the collective subject of English history, making

... the new historiography of early medieval times an extension, filling out and democratising, of older Whig notions of continuity. It was Stubbs who presented this most substantially; Green who made it popular and dramatic ... It is in Freeman ... of the three the most purely a narrative historian, that the strains are most apparent.

== Personal life and death ==
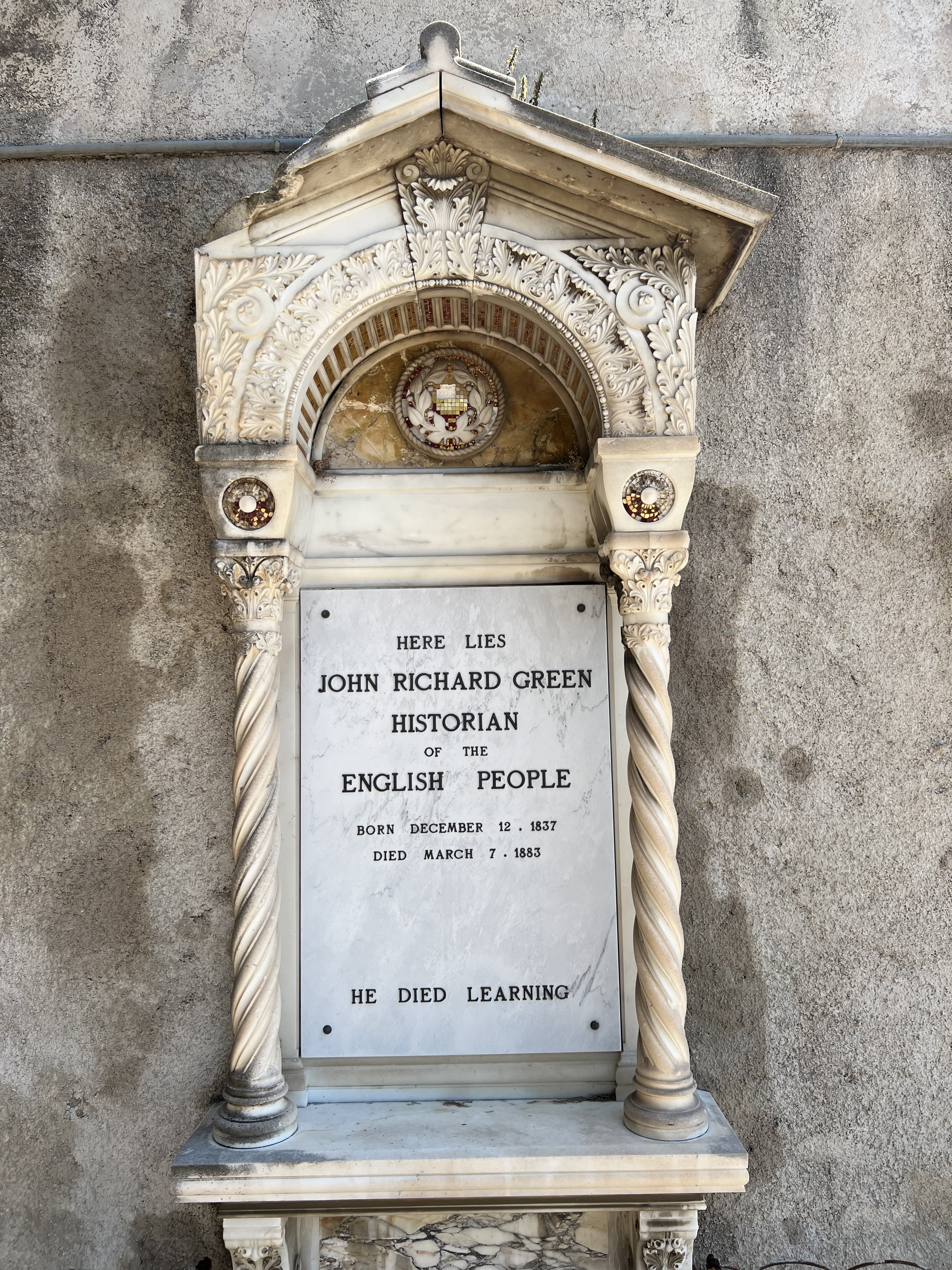
Green's memorial in the Vieux-Château cemetery, Menton, France

In 1877 he married Alice Stopford.

During the 1870s Green suffered from lung problems. His wife assisted him in carrying out and completing his work as his broken health took its toll during his few remaining years. He died on 7 March 1883.

The Oxford Historical Society was founded in 1884 in Green's memory and to fulfil one of his dying wishes.

== Works ==
- (1874) A Short History of the English People
- (1879) English Literature (Editor)
- (1879) Readings From English History (Editor)
- (1880) A History of the English People
- (1881) The Making of England
- (1883) The Conquest of England
- (1884) The Conquest of England

== Legacy ==
Sir Leslie Stephen edited a volume of Green's correspondence, which was published in 1901. (see "Works by and About John Richard Green" under "External Links," below.)
