= Hakewill =

Hakewill is a surname, and may refer to:

- Edward Charles Hakewill (1816–1872), English church architect
- Edmund Hakewill-Smith (1896–1986), South African-born British General
- George Hakewill (d.1649), English clergyman and author
- Geraldine Hakewill (born 1987), Australian actress and singer-songwriter
- Henry Hakewill (1771–1830), English architect
- James Hakewill (1778–1843), English architect, best known for his illustrated publications
- John Hakewill (1742–1791), English painter and interior decorator
- John Henry Hakewill (1810–1880), English architect
- William Hakewill (1574–1655), English legal antiquarian and Member of parliament
