= John Goldicutt =

British architect

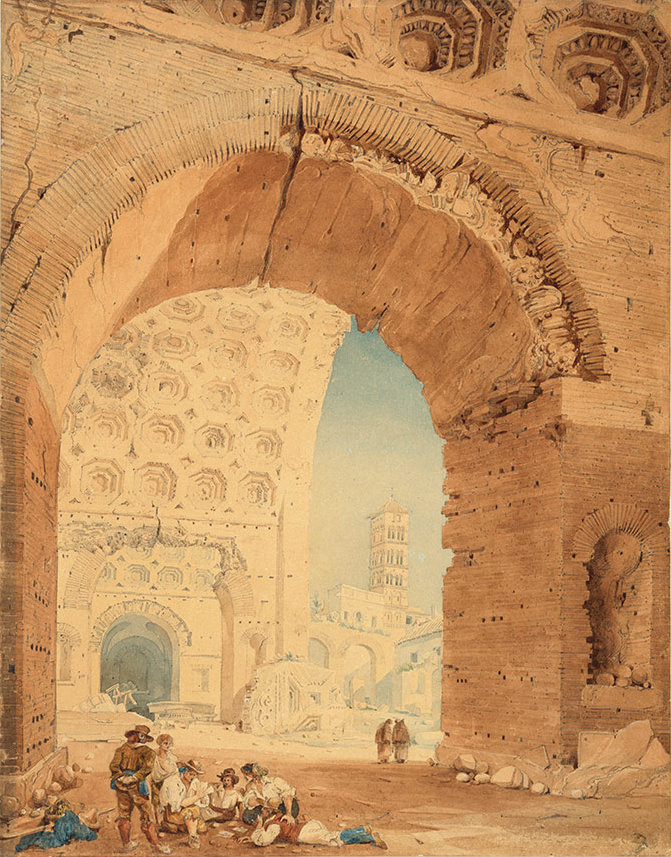
John Goldicutt, View in Rome, 1820. Watercolor over pencil. The Huntington Library, Art Collections, and Botanical Gardens, Gilbert Davis Collection.

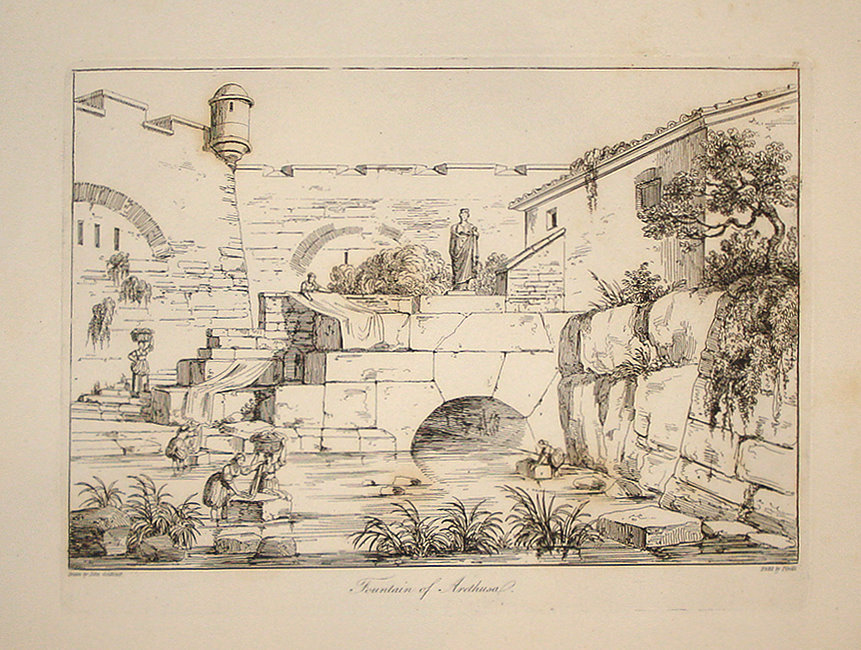
Fountain of Arethusa in Syracuse. Plate from The Antiquities of Sicily (1819). Drawn by John Goldicutt, etched by Bartolomeo Pinelli.

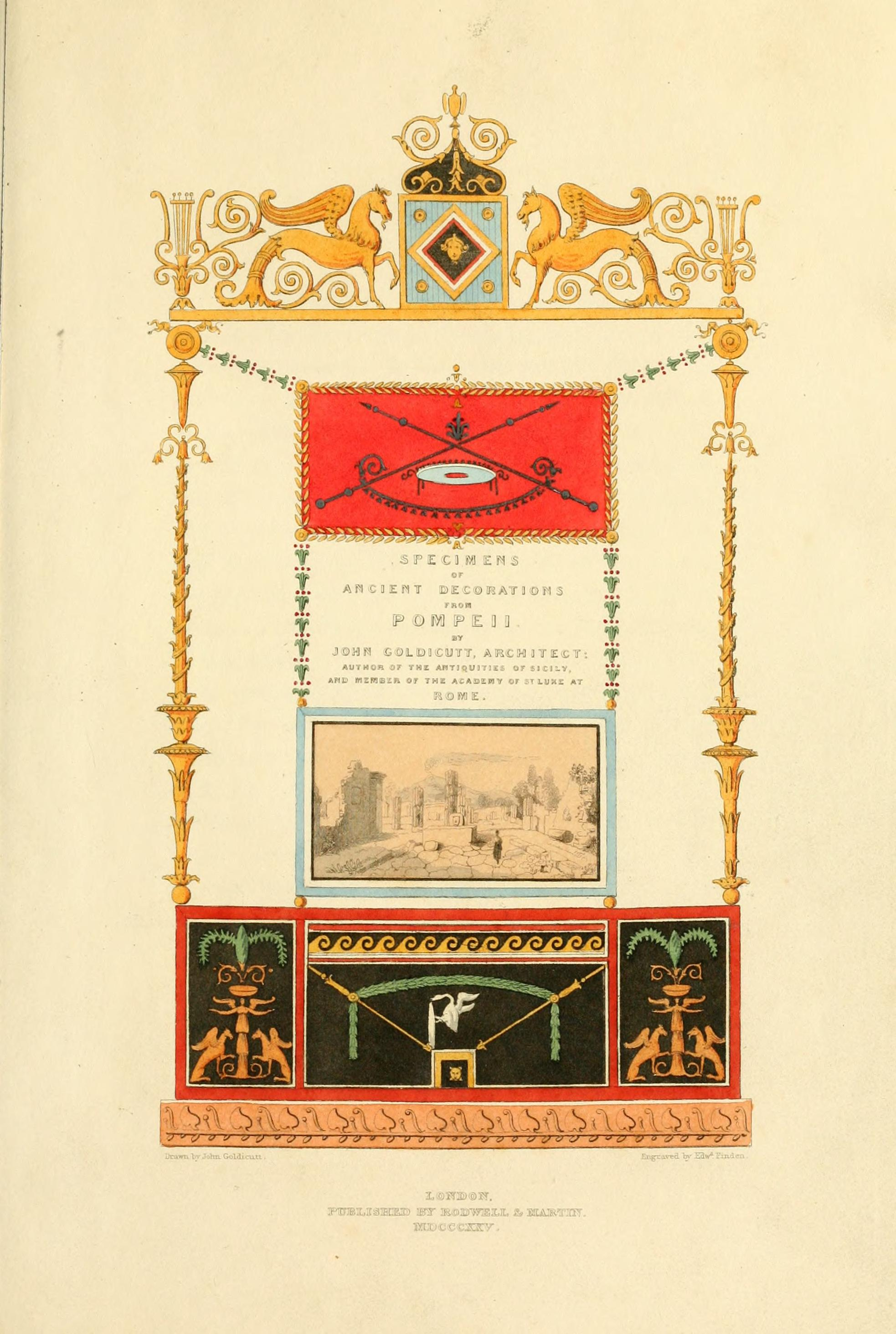
Title page of Specimens of Ancient Decorations from Pompeii, 1825. Drawn by John Goldicutt.

John Goldicutt (1793 – 3 October 1842) was a British architect, the son of a bank cashier, who was better known for his architectural drawings than his completed buildings. He won medals in London and Paris for his drawings and a gold medal from the Pope for his drawing of a section of St Peter's, Rome.

== Early life ==
John Goldicutt was born in 1793, to Hugh Goldicutt (died 1823), a bank cashier, and his wife, Celia, née Scholar (1756–1813). Goldicutt's early career was in banking and in 1803 he followed his father into the bank of Herries, Farquhar & Co. (now Lloyds) but he left the next year to join the architectural practice of Henry Hakewill.

Goldicutt began to study at the Royal Academy in 1812. He became a member of the Architectural Students' Society, and a skilled draughtsman and colourist, winning the Royal Academy silver medal in 1814 with drawings of the Mansion House. In 1815 he won the silver medal of the Society of Arts. In the same year he travelled to Paris where he studied at the school of Achille Leclère and entered the monthly competition of the Académie des Beaux-Arts.

He then travelled in Italy and Sicily for several years preparing drawings that were later published. Following his return to Britain he exhibited a drawing of the transverse section of St Peter's, Rome, for which he later received a gold medal from the Pope.

== Career ==
Goldicutt worked with Henry Hakewill until Hakewill's death in 1830, as well as working on his own projects. He submitted drawings for the design of the new Post Office building (1820), the Cambridge University observatory (1821), the Middlesex Lunatic Asylum (1829), the Fishmongers' Hall (1830) and for Nelson monument (1841). John Henry Hakewill (1811–1880) was later Goldicutt's pupil.

Goldicutt showed 35 architectural drawings at the Royal Academy between 1810 and 1842. In 1820, his drawing Ruins of the Great Hypaethral Temple, Salinuntum, Sicily, was etched by Bartolomeo Pinelli and appeared in Goldicutt's The Antiquities of Sicily (1819).

One of Goldicutt's last designs was for St James' Church, Sussex Gardens, Paddington, (c. 1841) which was finished by George Gutch after Goldicutt's death. Goldicutt's original scheme was for a neo-classical design in yellow brick, influenced by his travels in Italy. The yellow brick was used but Gutch changed the style to Gothic. The building was later extensively changed by G.E. Street in 1882.

== Appointments ==
Goldicutt was honorary secretary of the Institute of British Architects (1834–36), a member of the Academy of St Luke in Rome, and of the Accademia di Belle Arti in Naples. He was a justice and commissioner of sewers for Middlesex and Westminster and from 1828 he was surveyor for St Clement Danes and St Mary-le-Strand.

== Death ==
Goldicutt died on 3 October 1842 at 39 Clarges Street, London. He was survived by his wife and five sons and is buried at Kensal Green Cemetery.

== Selected publications ==
- The antiquities of Sicily, 1819. (Plates etched by Bartolomeo Pinelli of Rome)
- Specimens of ancient decorations from Pompeii. Rodwell & Martin, London, 1825.
- Heriot's Hospital, Edinburgh, 1826. (With illustrations lithographed by Goldicutt)
- "Ancient wells and reservoirs, with observations upon their decorative character", The Institute of British Architects Sessional Papers, 1836.
- The competition for the erection of the Nelson Monument critically examined, 1841.
