= All Saints' Church, Hockerill =

The Parish Church of All Saints', Hockerill
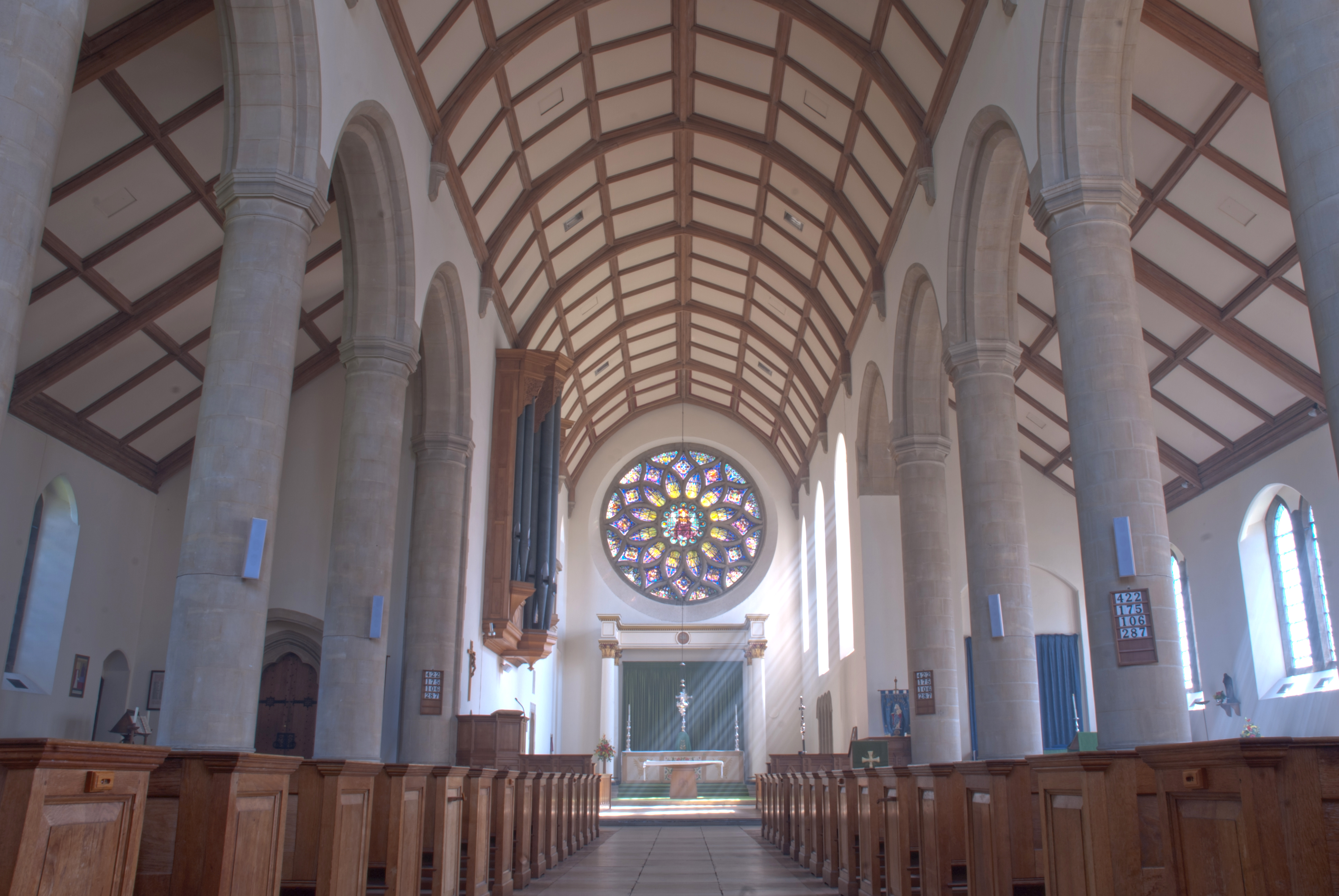
- All Saints' Hockerill looking east
- The Parish Church of All Saints', Hockerill
- OS grid reference: TL 49374 21401
- Location: Bishop's Stortford, Hertfordshire
- Country: England
- Denomination: Church of England
- Website: allsaintshockerill.org.uk

History
- Consecrated: 7 January 1852 (burnt down) 24 July 1937

Architecture
- Heritage designation: Grade II (UK)
- Architect: George Pritchett (1851) Stephen Dykes Bower (1936)
- Architectural type: 20th-century Gothic Revival

Administration
- Diocese: St Albans
- Parish: Hockerill

All Saints' Church, Hockerill is a Grade II listed building, notable for being the first church designed by the 20th-century architect Stephen Dykes Bower. It is also notable for containing a rose window by Hugh Ray Easton and a pipe organ by Henry Willis II of Henry Willis & Sons.

== History ==
=== The First Church ===
For centuries Bishop's Stortford was a single parish. In response to swelling congregation numbers, it was divided into three by the vicar of St Michael's, Bishop's Stortford, Francis William Rhodes (1807–1878), father of the magnate and politician Cecil Rhodes. The first church of All Saints', Hockerill was built in 1851, designed by local architect George Pritchett and consecrated on 7 January 1852. It was a Commissioners' church, having been built with money voted by Parliament. The new parish was created and assigned to the new church by Queen Victoria on 2 February 1852. John Menet was both the first Vicar of the parish and the first Chaplain of the neighbouring Diocesan Training College for Schoolmistresses (1852), the latter now replaced by Hockerill Anglo-European College.

On Friday 21 June 1935 the church was gutted by a fire, making national news. Villagers first tried to put out the fire, but retreated when the fire spread to the roof. The vicar, Reginald J. Mockridge, and villagers managed to save items from the burning building including the Communion plate, records and lectern. The roof collapsed within half an hour and the smoke was so dense that gas masks had to be used by the firemen. The firemen were able to do little, owing to a lack of water.

=== The Present Church ===
Funds for the new church were already being collected the same day of the fire. The new church cost a total of £27,178 (approximately £1.4m today), of which £9528 was raised publicly (approximately £0.5m today). This involved an auction to which Queen Mary of Teck gave a pair of vases, The Duchess of York (later Queen Elizabeth The Queen Mother) gave a parchment blotter and picture of Princess Elizabeth (subsequently Elizabeth II), and film stars gave autographed photographs. The foundation stone was laid on 20 July 1936 and the new church was consecrated on 24 July 1937.

=== Vicars of All Saints ===
1852 John Menet MA also founder of the Diocesan Training College for Schoolmistresses, now Hockerill Anglo-European College

1893 Alexander Irving BA DSc

1921 William John Brodwick Edgeworth Gibbons BA

1923 Stanford Frederick Hudson Robinson MA

1926 Reginald James Mockridge MA

1939 Arthur Macpherson Erat Huggins

1944 Albert Edwin Saul

1948 Cyril Wilfred Jackson AKC

1953 Myles Kenneth Raikes MA later Honorary Canon of St Albans

1964 Francis Edward Tester BA later Honorary Canon of Chelmsford

1972 Geoffrey Lewis Edwards BD AKC also Honorary Canon of St Albans

1985 Anthony James Allsop AKC

2004 Kevin Ian Goss MA GRSM LRAM LTCL LGSM later Honorary Canon of St Albans

2015 Simon David Mansfield BSc MA MPhil PhD

2024 Simon John Vivian BMus

== Architecture ==
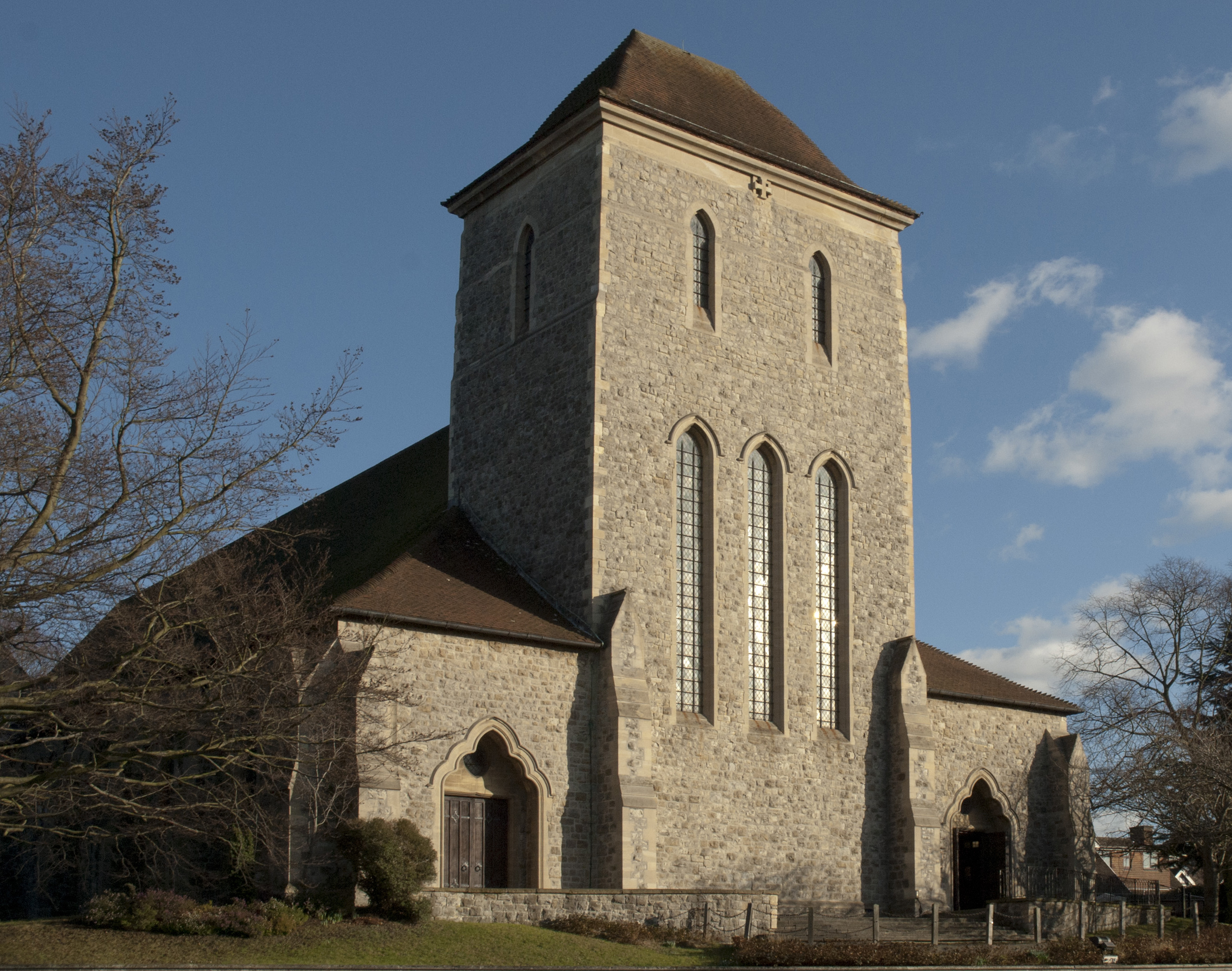
West front

The 1936 church was Dykes Bower's first church, starting his lifelong work on churches in the Gothic Revival style. In one opinion it is his best church, combining a traditional plan and artistic coherence with a freedom from stylistic convention that makes it stand apart from most churches of the time.

=== Exterior ===
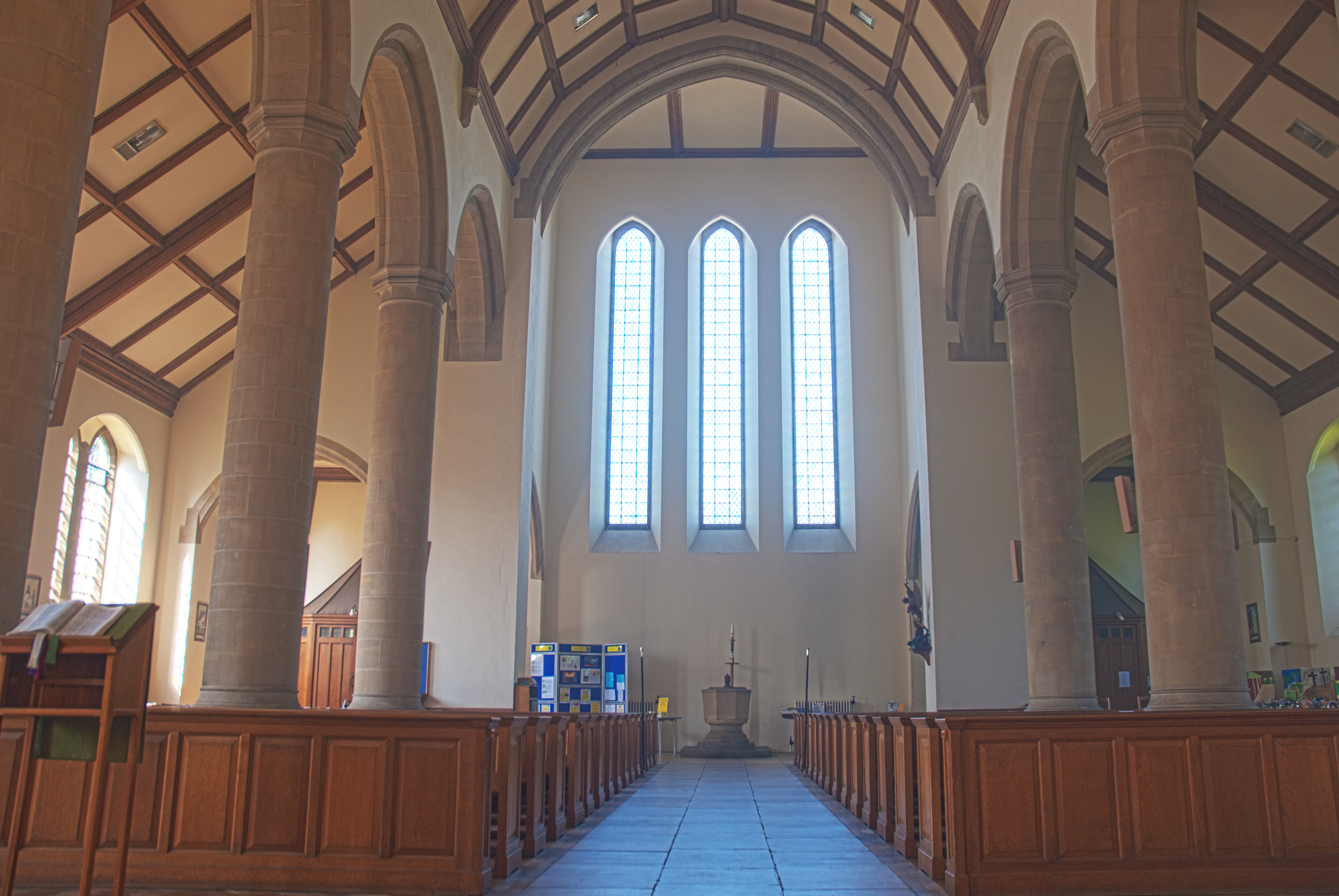
Looking down the nave to the west end

The west front dominates the east side of Bishop's Stortford with its tall, broad central tower and distinctive steep saddleback roof, and three impressively tall lancets. The use of Kentish ragstone facings creates a monumental effect, reinforced by buttresses that flank the aisles and chancel. At the south west entrance there is a 19th-century timber lych gate, which is the only part of the original 1851 church that was not damaged by fire. Indeed, Dykes Bower's brief included the need to use the remains of the old church, a strategy he later employed when rebuilding the destroyed church of St John the Evangelist Church, Newbury.

=== Interior ===
The church's simple layout is of a nave and two flanking aisles, leading to a long aisle-less chancel. However, it starts with a narthex at the base of the tower, containing the baptistery, which is in direct line with the high altar. The simple but noble interior is made bright and airy by vast open spaces, many lancet windows, and plastered walls. The impressive height of the nave (45 ft or 14m) is accentuated by giant drum piers and gothic pointed arches, which hold a coffered wagon roof. The airy, refined interior and coffered roof are later reflected in Dykes Bower's church of The Holy Spirit, Southsea, Hampshire, and in his work on the chancel and transepts at St Edmundsbury Cathedral, including the Cathedral's oriel window, which is foreshadowed by the oriel window at All Saints'. Distinctive to All Saints', the chancel is dominated by an east rose window (see below). Sitting within the church's Gothic setting, the furniture is of a Classical style, including four classical pillars that surround the high altar.

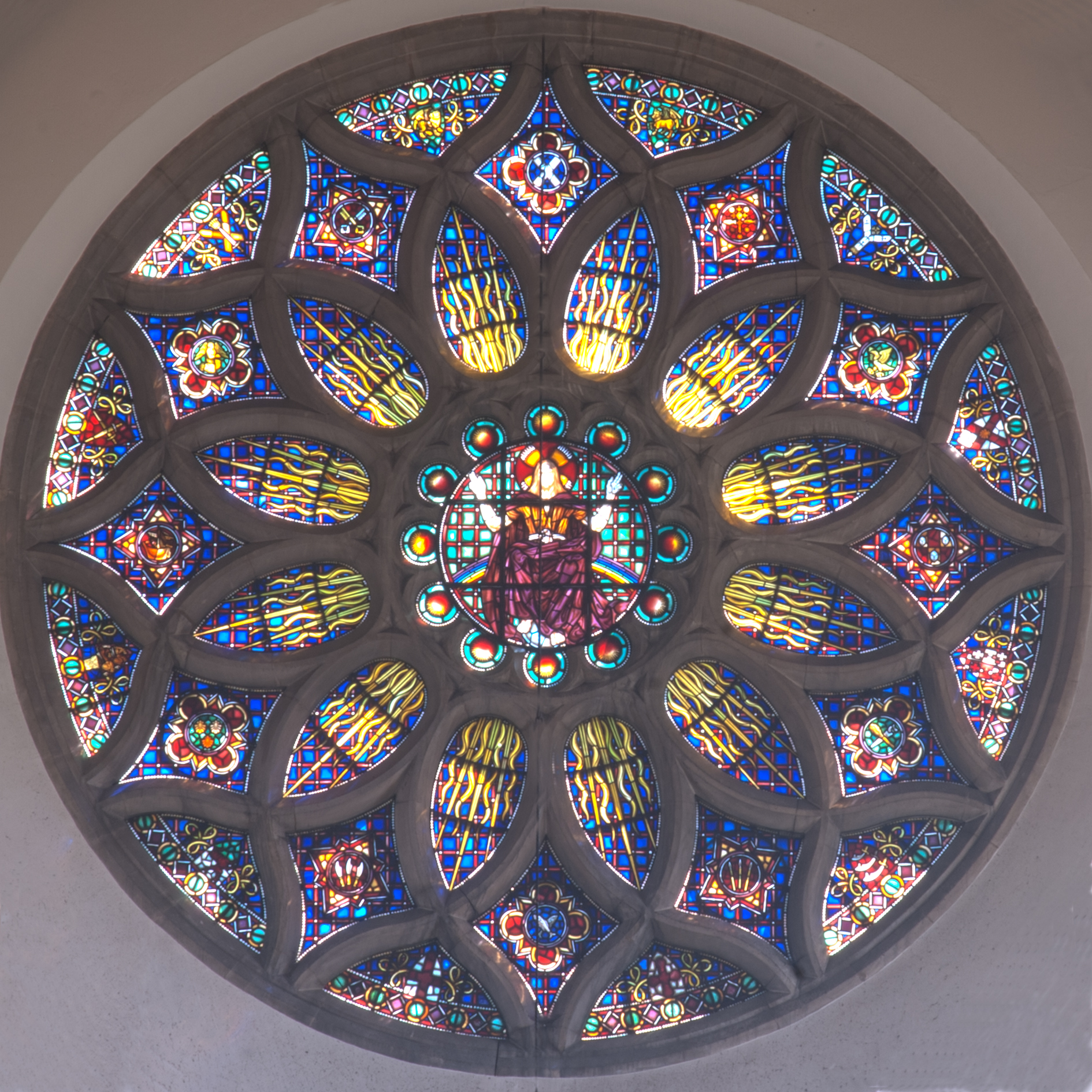
Rose Window by Hugh Easton

=== Rose window ===
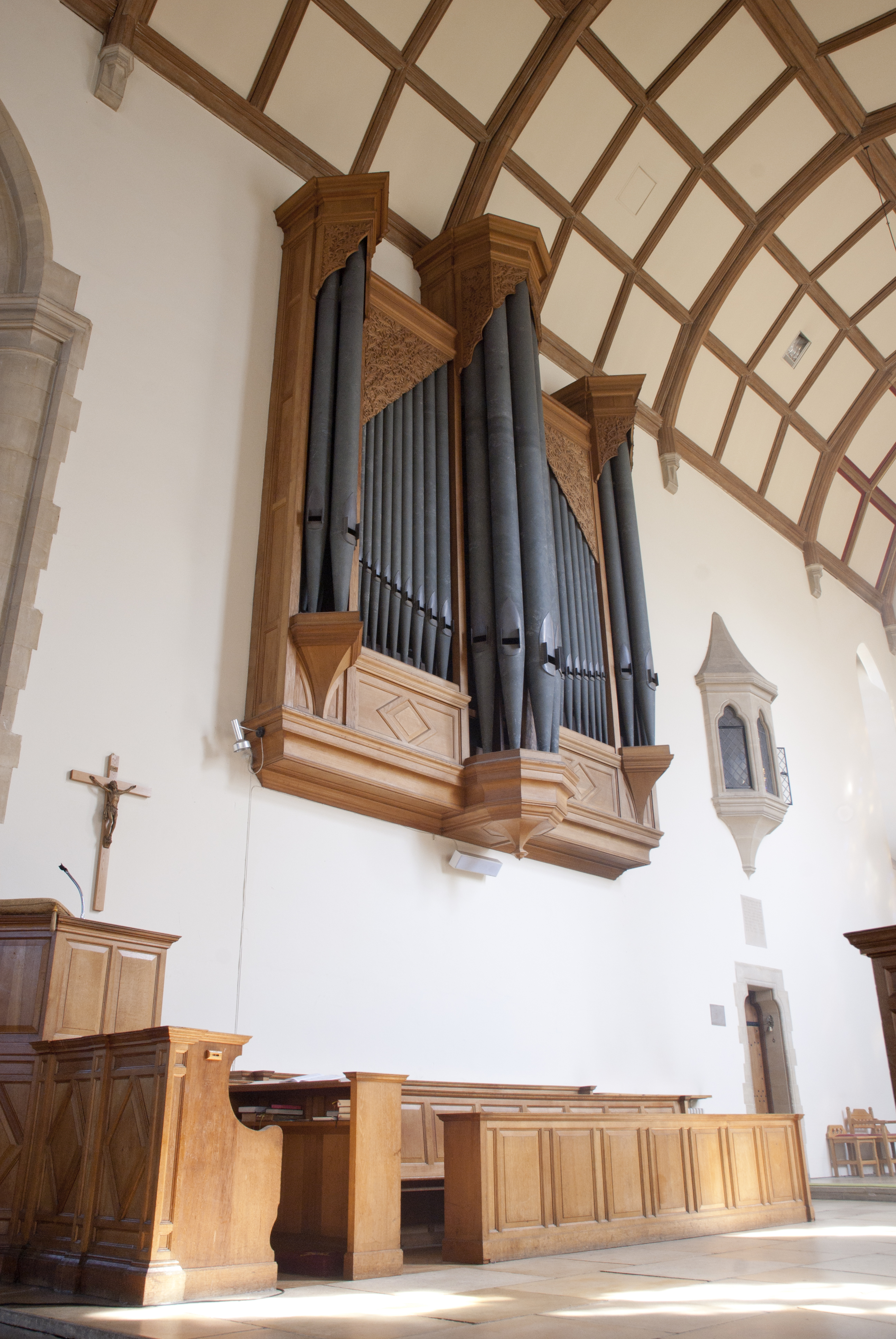
Elevated organ case and oriel window

The interior's focal point is an 18-foot (5.5 m) rose window with flowing cusped tracery, designed by Hugh Ray Easton (1906–1965), and situated at the east end above the high altar. The window is the principal component that adds colour to the building; the window's variety of intricate geometric shapes and rich, deep colours are accentuated by the building's plain walls and stone. As is traditional, the central roundel depicts Christ in Majesty, with the lights around him depicting the emblems of the Gospel writers, apostles, and heraldry of dioceses associated with the parish. The design is similar to Dykes Bower's rose window at Lancing College Chapel, in respect that both are in the Rayonnant rose window style with pointed-arched mullions radiating from a central roundel, and with outer lights depicting church heraldry.

=== Willis organ ===
The two manual organ was built in 1937 by Henry Willis II of Henry Willis & Sons. The pipes are positioned in an elevated case on the north wall of the chancel, exploiting the building's excellent acoustic. The case was designed by Dykes Bower, with the 16 ft Open Diapason pipes on display. Its specification can be found on the church's official website (see external links).

== All Saints' today ==
All Saints' is in the Affirming Catholicism tradition of the Church of England, and caters for other traditions. There are eight regular services of varying styles. There is a children's Sunday school, a youth group, a film club, a Mother's Union, two home groups, and teams of pastoral visitors, altar servers, readers and flower arrangers. A robed choir sings every Sunday, and a children's choir sings at the All-Age Mass. The building is a popular venue for concerts owing to its excellent acoustic. The church is linked to All Saints' Church of England Primary School and Nursery. The building is usually open during the day between 9am and 6pm.
