= Norfolk Square =

Garden square in Central London

Coordinates: 51°30′57″N 0°10′24″W

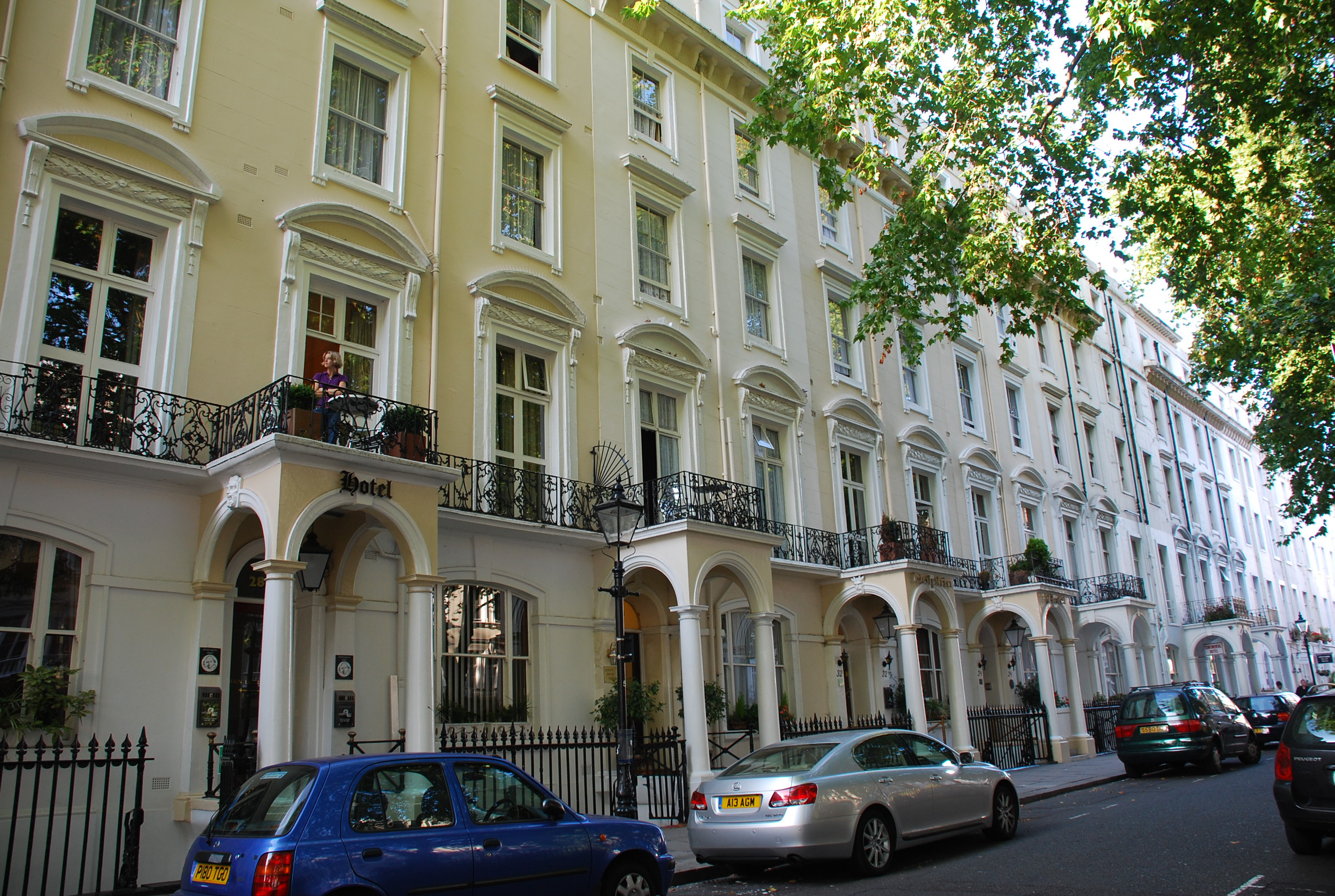
Houses in Norfolk Square.

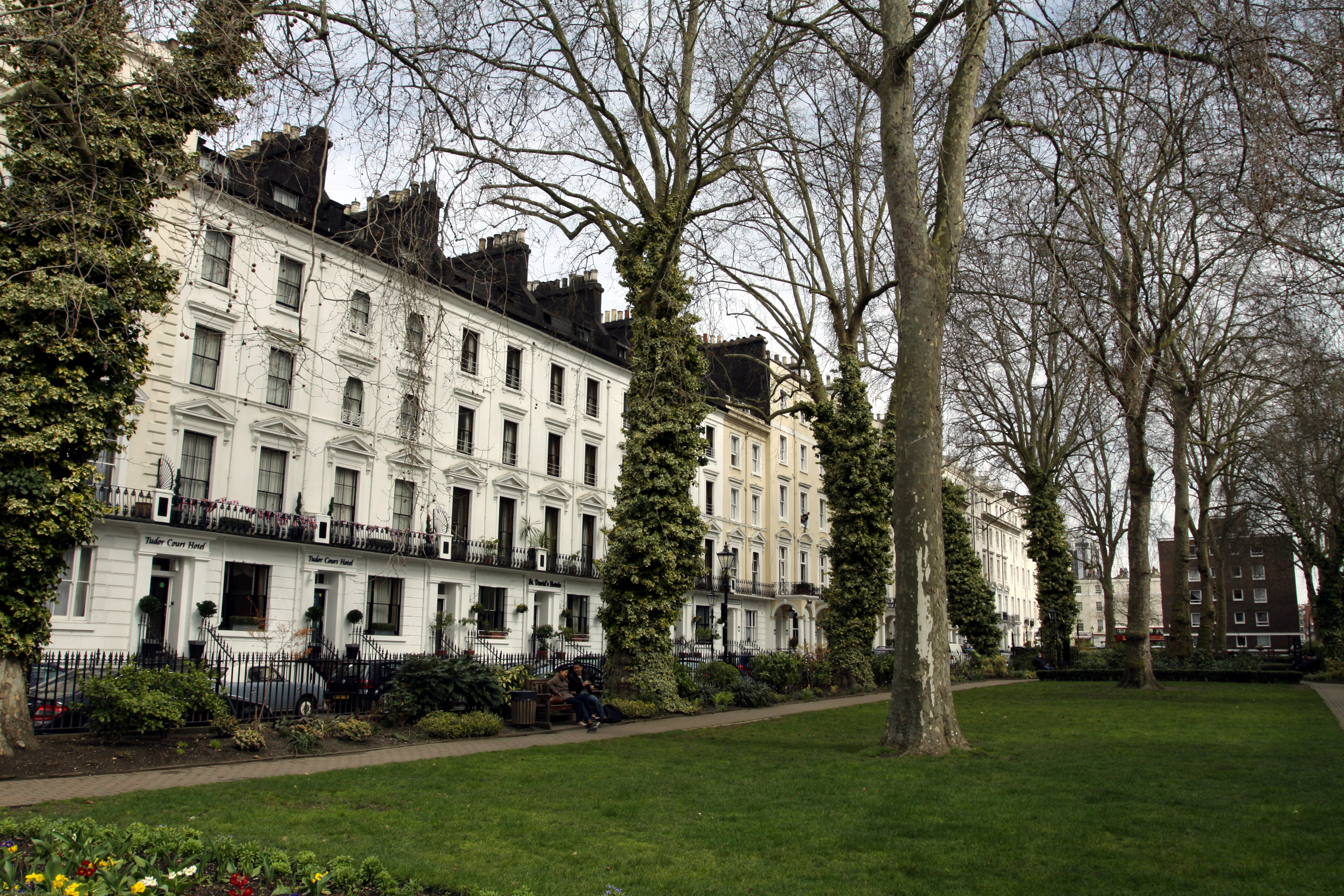
Norfolk Square gardens.

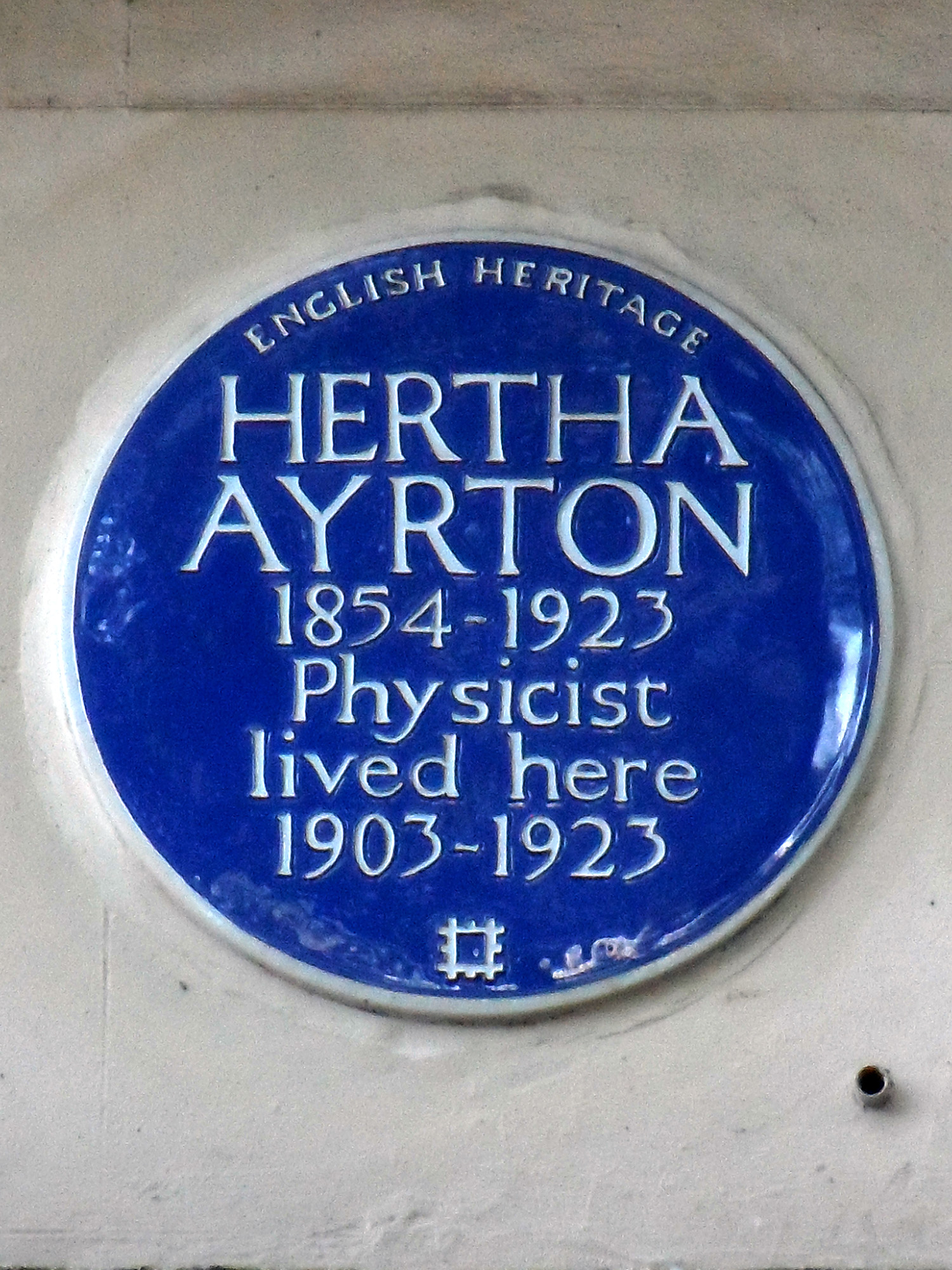
Blue plaque for the scientist Hertha Ayrton.

Norfolk Square is a rectangular garden square in Paddington in Central London. Located in the City of Westminster, it is part of the Tyburnia district north of Hyde Park. It runs east to west from London Street to Norfolk Place. Praed Street and Sussex Gardens are directly parallel to it north and south respectively.

The street was developed on the site of a former waterworks of the Grand Union Canal. It was one of three located close to what became Paddington Station, another of them becoming Talbot Square. It was developed in the early Victorian era, and along with Talbot Square became a residential location for the wealthy. At the eastern end was All Saints' Church, built in 1847, but later demolished and replaced with the existing Edna House apartments. At the western end of the square, across London Street, is the Sawyer's Arms pub.

Numbers 2–22, terraces of 1840s stuccoed housing, are now Grade II listed as are the slightly later numbers 24–42. Notable residents have included the scientist Hertha Ayrton who lived at Number 41 from 1903 to 1923 and is now commemorated with a blue plaque.

== Bibliography ==
- Bebbington, Gillian. London Street Names. Batsford, 1972.
- Cockburn, J. S., King, H. P. F. & McDonnell, K. G. T. A History of the County of Middlesex. Institute of Historical Research, 1989.
- Cherry, Bridget & Pevsner, Nikolaus. London 3: North West. Yale University Press, 2002.
- Hibbert, Christopher, Weinreb, Ben, Keay, John & Keay, Julia. The London Encyclopaedia. Pan Macmillan, 2011.
- Higham, Nick. The Mercenary River: Private Greed, Public Good: A History of London's Water. Hachette, 2022.
