= Hockerill Anglo-European College =

Location
- Dunmow Road; Bishop's Stortford, Hertfordshire, CM23 5HX; England; 51°52′16″N 0°10′16″E

Information
- Type: State boarding academy
- Established: 1980
- Founder: John Menet
- Department for Education URN: 136482 Tables
- Ofsted: Reports
- Principal: Alasdair Mackenzie
- Gender: Coeducational
- Age: 11 to 18
- Enrolment: As of 2023: 925
- Capacity: As of 2023: 728
- Houses: Canterbury, Winchester, Durham, Rochester, Thames, Roding
- Colours: Blue and yellow
- Website: www.hockerill.com

Hockerill Anglo-European College (formerly known as Hockerill School) is an international state boarding school with academy status located in Bishop's Stortford, England.

== History ==
In 1850, Hockerill was founded as a teacher-training college for schoolmistresses by the first vicar of All Saints' Church, Hockerill, the Reverend John Menet. The training school was closed in 1978 and, in 1980, was reopened as Hockerill School when Fyfield School (in Essex) and Kennylands School (in Berkshire) merged. In 1995 it achieved grant-maintained status and in 1998 became known as Hockerill Anglo-European College. The school also gained Music College status. The Music College was opened by Lord David Puttnam on 8 October 2006. It became an academy in 2011.

== The International Baccalaureate and MYP ==
In 1998, Hockerill introduced the International Baccalaureate (IB) as the only form of post-16 study and accepted its first sixth form students. In 2012, 100% of Hockerill pupils passed the IB Diploma with an average points score of 36.4. The Middle Years Programme (MYP) was introduced in 2005 for years 7–9 and complements the GCSE and IGCSE taught at the college.

== School performance and inspections ==
As of 2023, the school's most recent inspection by Ofsted was in 2022-23. The school was judged Good. Inspectors noted that most students take two foreign languages at secondary level, and that all sixth form students take at least one language as part of the IB Diploma. The school's boarding provision was also inspected in 2023, and judged Good.

== Equipes ==
Hockerill Anglo-European College has four houses (known as Equipes). The Equipe Colour blue symbolises Ruth Bader Ginsburg, red symbolises Nelson Mandela, green symbolises Mary Seacole and white symbolises Alan Turing. They have recently added a new 5th Equipe with the colour yellow symbolising Marie Curie.

Before the academic year 2021-22 started, the Equipe Colour blue symbolised Isambard Kingdom Brunel, red symbolised Leonardo Da Vinci, green symbolised Johann Wolfgang von Goethe and white symbolised Blaise Pascal.
