= Sussex Square, London =

Garden square in Central London

Sussex Square
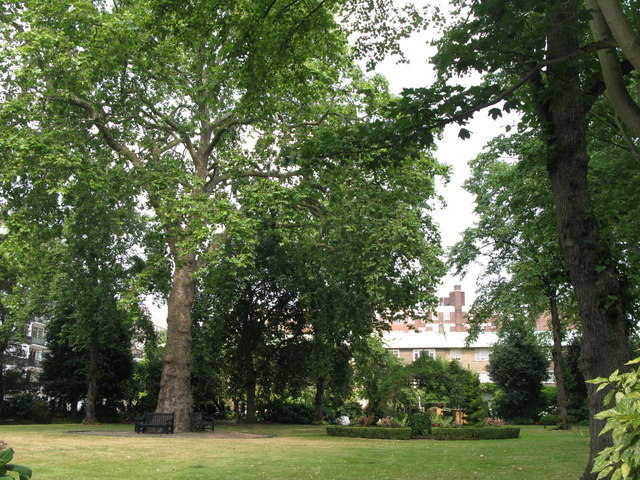
- Gardens at centre of the Square.

- Location within Greater London
- Type: Garden square
- Location: Paddington
- Coordinates: 51°30′47.16″N 0°10′23.8794″W

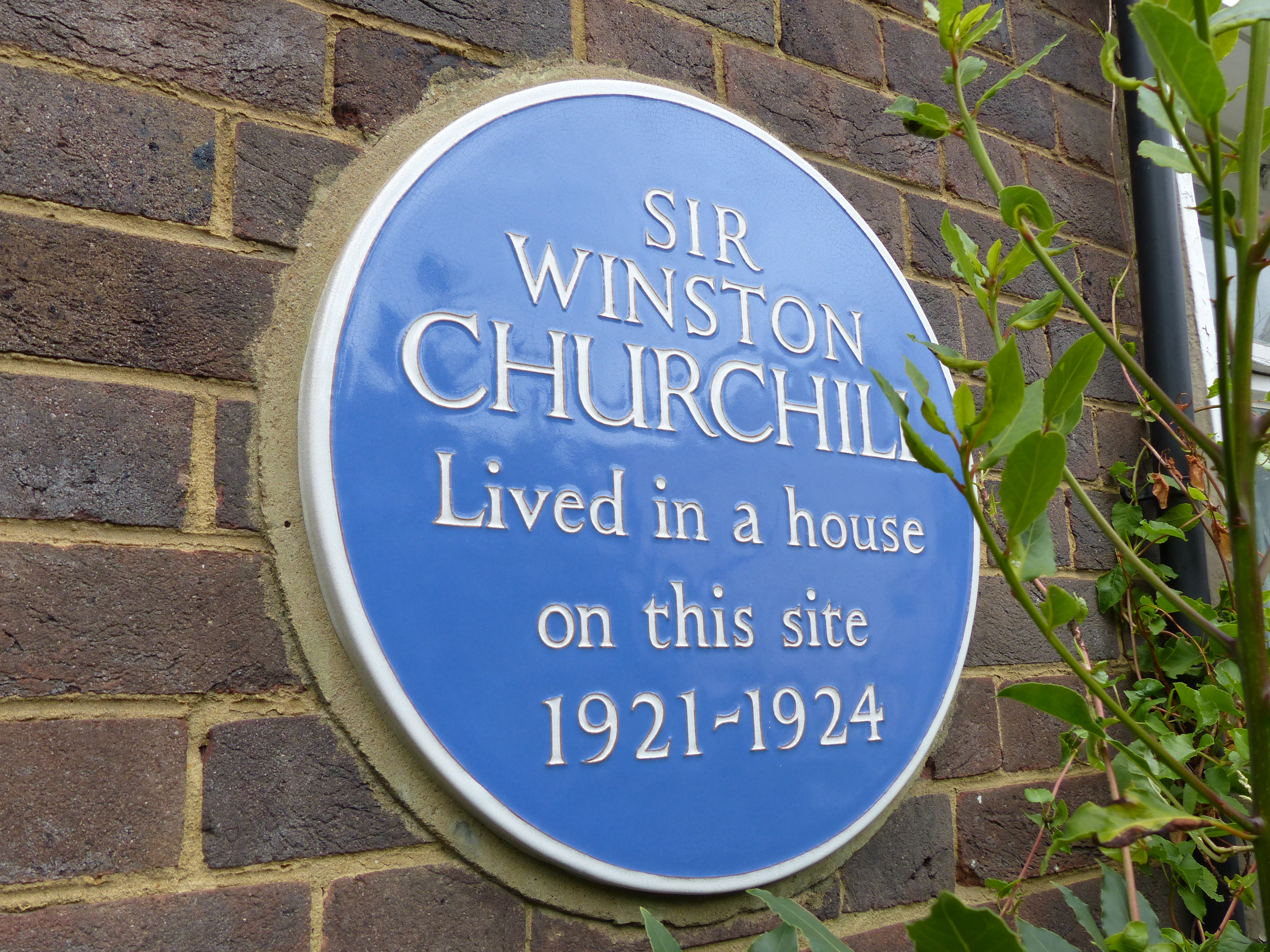
Blue plaque on the site of Prime Minister Winston Churchill's 1920s residence.

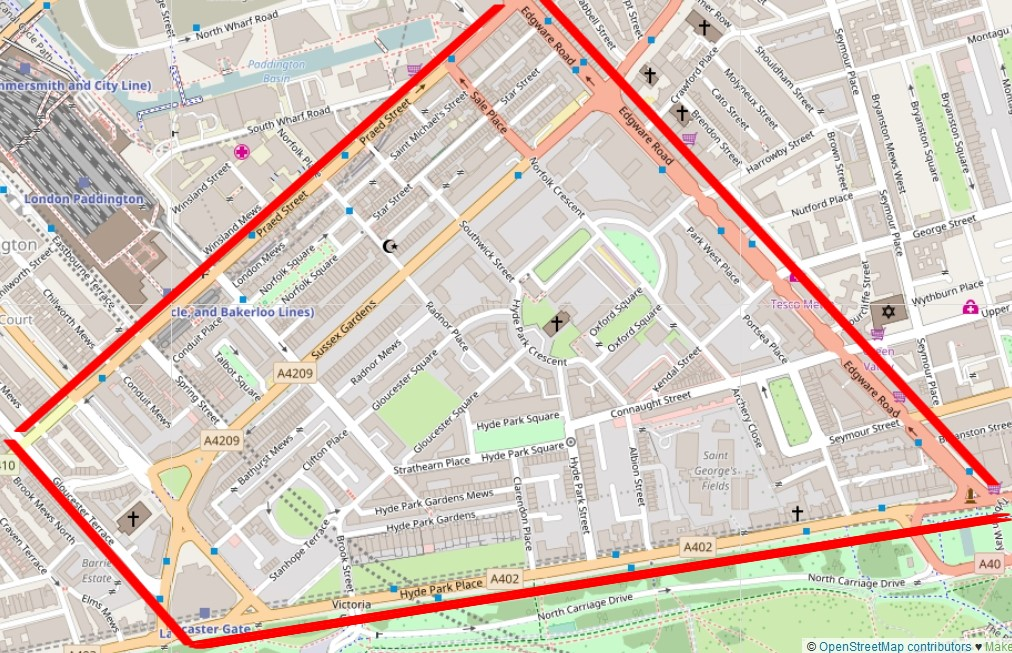
Map showing the boundaries of Tyburnia.

Sussex Square is a garden square in Paddington in Central London. Located in the City of Westminster, it is part of the Tyburnia area north of Hyde Park. Stanhope Terrace runs along its southern side.

Tyburnia was developed in the first half of the nineteenth century, providing upmarket residential streets and squares for the expanding population of London. Although planned and laid out some years earlier, construction on Sussex Square did not commence until 1840. While many other streets in the area feature white stuccoed buildings that once would have been commonplace on Sussex Square, it was heavily redeveloped in the twentieth century. The square now features no buildings older than 1933.

Like the nearby Sussex Gardens and Sussex Place, it takes its name from the title of the Duke of Sussex, younger brother of kings George IV and William IV. Mews streets are located on two sides of the square. While Sussex Mews East features modern buildings except for the Grade II listed Sussex Cottage, the design of Sussex Mews West retains the original style intact.

Winston Churchill, the future Prime Minister, lived at 2 Sussex Square in the early 1920s. A blue plaque commemorates the site where Churchill once lived, although the original house was subsequently demolished. Other former residents include Lord Coleridge, the Lord Chief Justice in the late Victorian era.

== Bibliography ==
- Cherry, Bridget & Pevsner, Nikolaus. London 3: North West. Yale University Press, 2002.
- Ponting, Clive. Churchill. Sinclair-Stevenson, 1994.
- Sumeray, Derek & Sheppard, John.London Plaques. Bloomsbury Publishing, 2011.
- Rosen, Barbara & Zuckermann, Wolfgang. The Mews of London: A Guide to the Hidden Byways of London's Past. Webb & Bower, 1982.
