= Goddard & Gibbs =

English glassmaking company

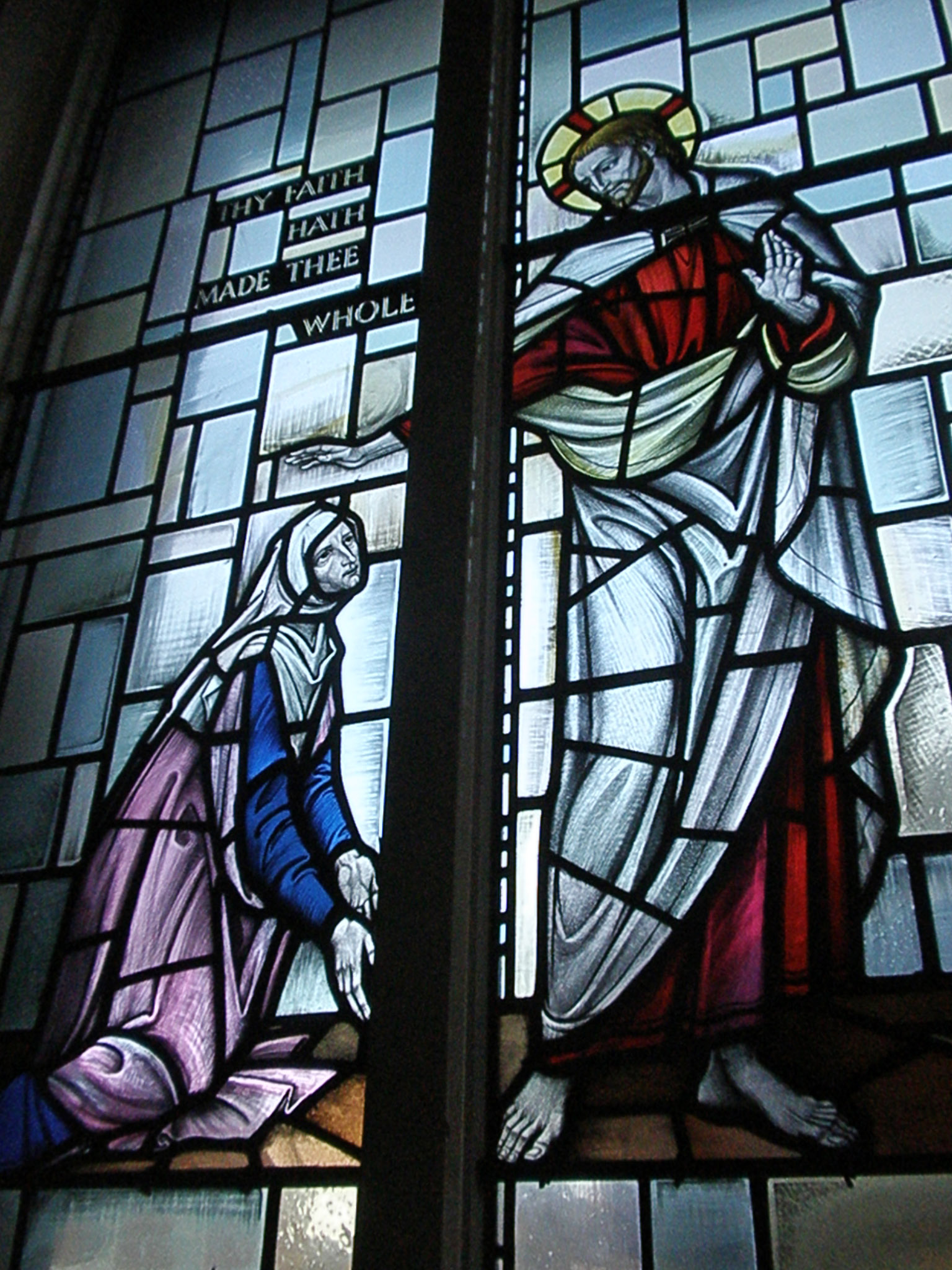
St Mary Magdalen, Coventry, by A. E. Buss of Goddard & Gibbs, 1964

Goddard & Gibbs was a London-based glassmaker and stained glass window manufacturer. The company was established by Walter Gibbs in 1868, although one firm which it subsequently acquired had been established earlier, in 1855. Goddard & Gibbs was formed by a merger in 1938; the company continued to trade until it was acquired by Hardman & Co. in 2006. Hardman itself ceased to trade in 2008.

== History ==
=== James Clark & Sons ===
The firm which became Goddard & Gibbs was established by James Clark in 1855, and was still trading at Scoresby Street, Blackfriars in 1900. Soon after, it was acquired by Walter Gibbs & Son.

=== Walter Gibbs & Sons ===
Walter Gibbs (1846–1889) was the son of glass stainer John Gibbs and his wife Elizabeth (née Booker). He established his own firm in 1868, joined by his wife Sarah Ann Colwell (1847–1895), and sons Walter Thomas (1870–1927), Arthur Augustus (1872–1938), and Horace Albert (1877–1917). In 1910 the firm was trading at 210 Union Street, Southwark.

=== Goddard's Glass Works ===
A trader by the name of Goddard established a shop in Woolwich in 1933.

=== Goddard & Gibbs ===
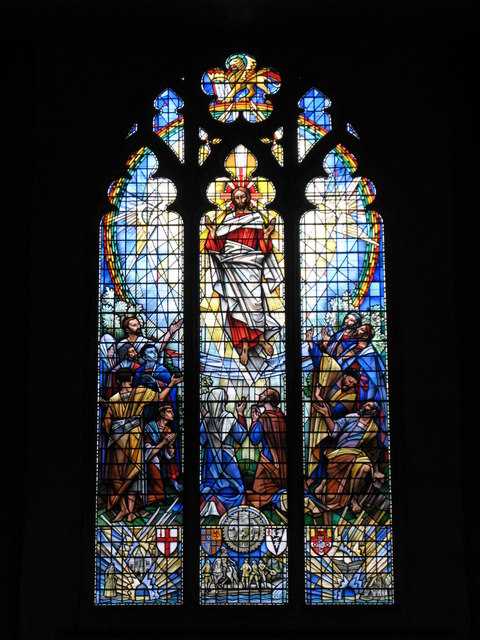
The Ascension in St Mark's Church, Myddelton Square, by A. E. Buss of Goddard & Gibbs, 1962

Goddard & Gibbs was formed by the merger in 1938 of Walter Gibbs & Sons and Goddard's Glass Works. The firm kept its name despite subsequent takeovers by James Clark & Eaton Ltd, and, in 1978, Charles Clark. The firm and its predecessors all traded in Blackfriars, until it eventually operated from studios at 41-49 Kingsland Road in Dalston, London. Late in its history the firm moved to Marlborough House, Cooks Road, Stratford (subsequently demolished for Crossrail works at Pudding Mill Lane). In 2006 it was acquired by Hardman & Co., and ceased to have a separate identity. Hardman itself closed two years later, and the Goddard & Gibbs archive appears to have been lost at that point.

The firm had an international reputation for contemporary stained glass as well as the restoration of older stained glass. Early in its history it advertised a unique ability to make embossed glass signs and showboards at 'the shortest notice'. After the Second World War the firm concentrated on replacement glass for bomb-damaged churches, as well as glass for churches in Canada, Ghana, New Zealand, Nigeria, Nyasaland, South Africa and the United States.

Goddard & Gibbs' designers included Arthur Edward Buss (1905–1999), John Lawson (1932–2009) (who joined in 1970 from Faith Craft), Maud Sumner (1902–1985), and George Cooper-Abbs (1901–1966). Other designers later in the history of the firm included Caroline Swash, Zoe Angle, Chris Madline, Laura Perry, Louise Watson, Sophie Lister-Hussain and Sharon McMullin.

== Namesake ==
A successor firm reviving the name Goddard & Gibbs was soon established at Corsham, and relocated to Trowbridge, both in Wiltshire. In 2020, the company was engaged in lead window repair.

== List of works ==
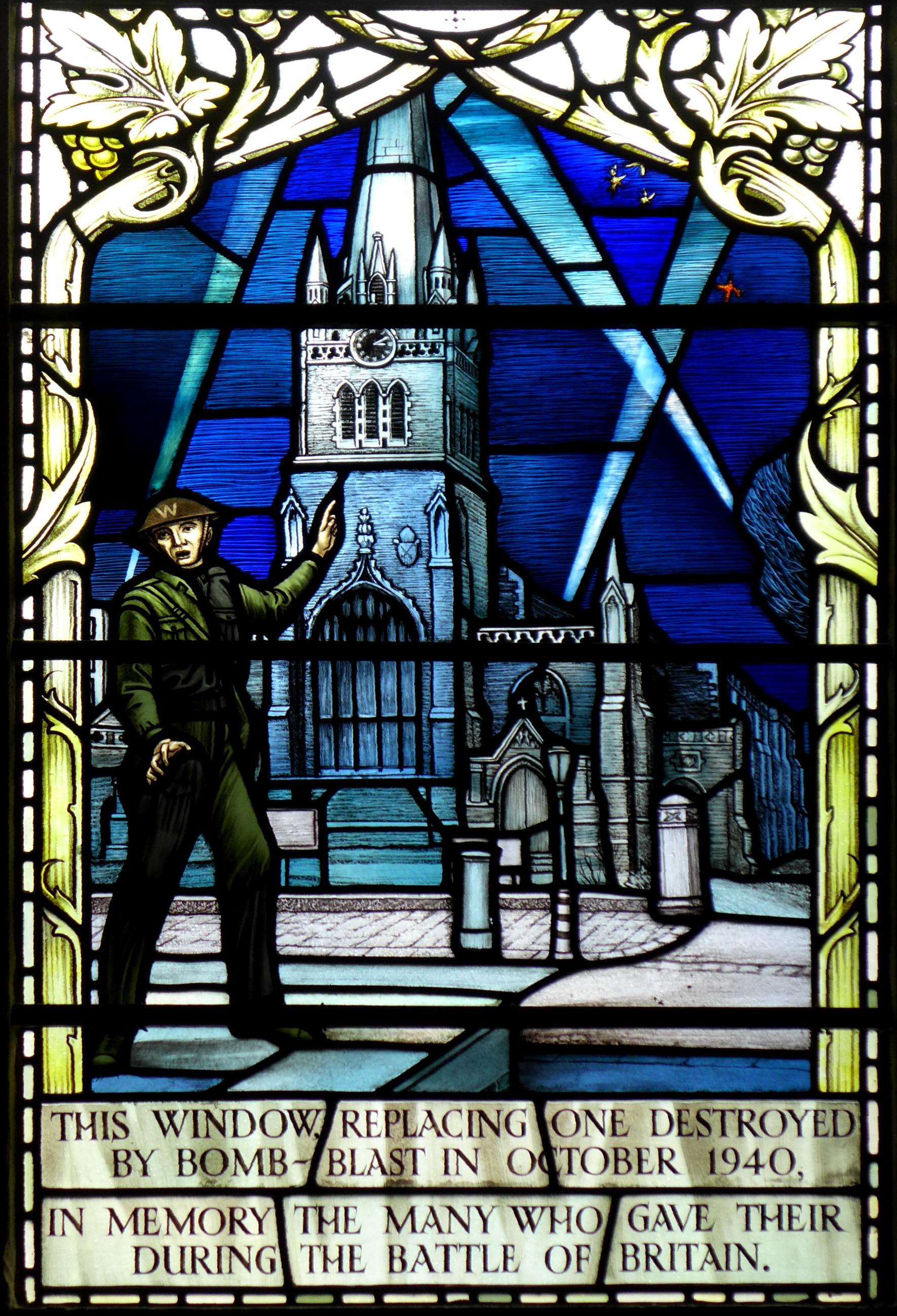
Battle of Britain memorial at St James's, Sussex Gardens, London, by A. E. Buss of Goddard & Gibbs, 1955

=== Brunei ===
- Glass Dome at Jame' Asr Hassanil Bolkiah Mosque, Kampong Kiarong, Brunei-Muara (John Lawson, 1994)

=== England ===
- Sanctuary Windows at St John the Evangelist Church, Newbury, Berkshire (A. E. Buss, 1955)
- East window at Church of the Holy Cross & All Saints, Warley, Essex (John Lawson, 1986)
- The Ascension at St Mark's Church, Clerkenwell, Greater London (A. E. Buss, 1962)
- St. Michael & All Angels' Church, London Fields, Greater London (A. E. Buss, 1959)
- Te Deum and Battle of Britain memorial at St James' Church, Paddington, Greater London (A. E. Buss, 1955)
- Windows at All Saints Church, Benhilton, Greater London (John Lawson, 2001)
- Royal Coat of Arms at Henry VII Chapel, Westminster, Greater London (John Lawson, 2000)
- Millennium Window at St. Peter's Church, Boughton Monchelsea, Kent (John Lawson, 2000)
- Depiction of Saint Fursey in All Saints' Church, Great Melton, Norfolk

=== United Arab Emirates ===
- 41 metre window, since demolished, at the Ramada Hotel, Dubai (John Lawson, 1983)

== Gallery ==
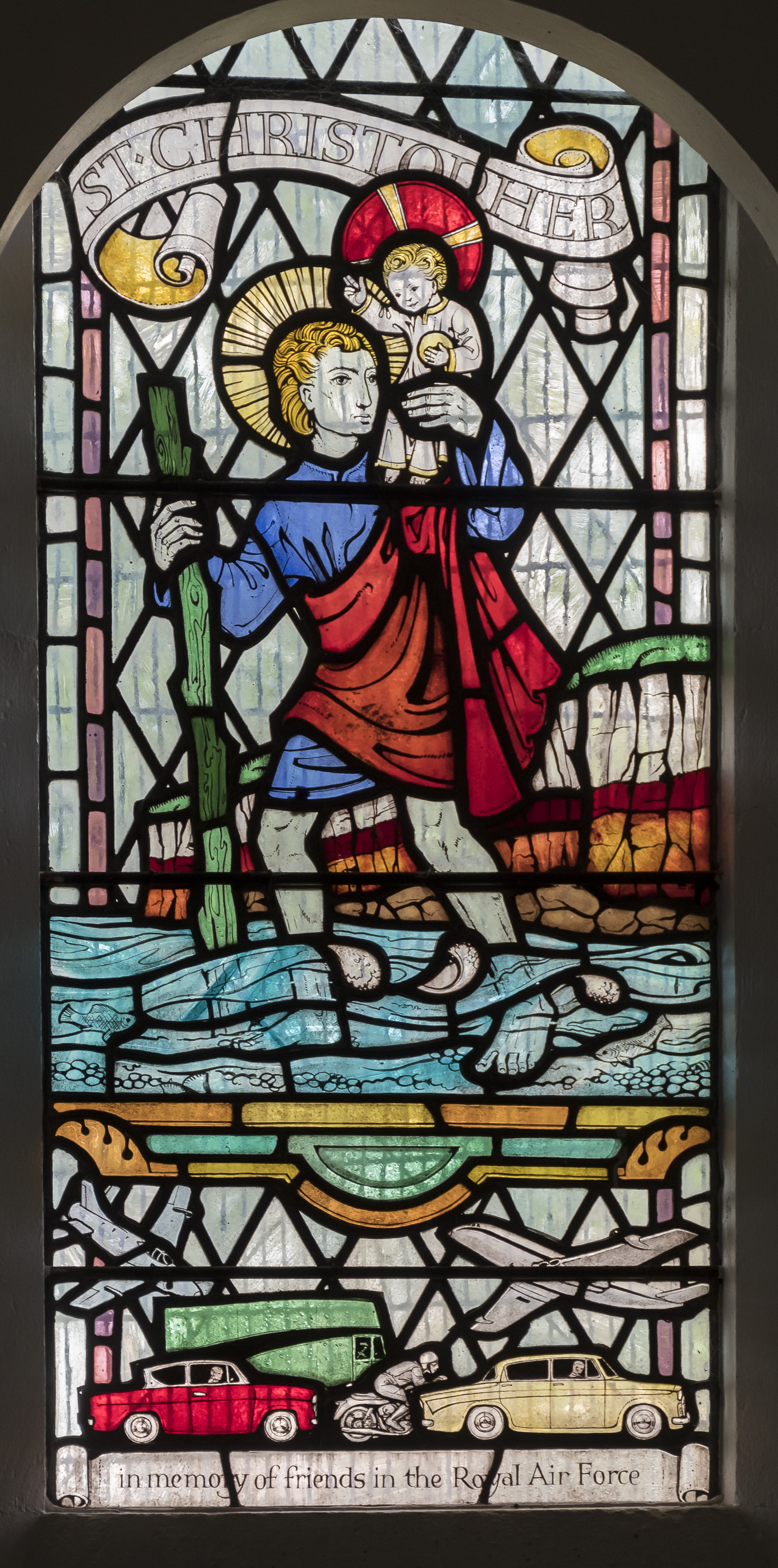
St Christopher carrying the Christ child in front of the cliffs of Hunstanton in St Edmund's, Hunstanton, by John Lawson of Faith Craft, 1962

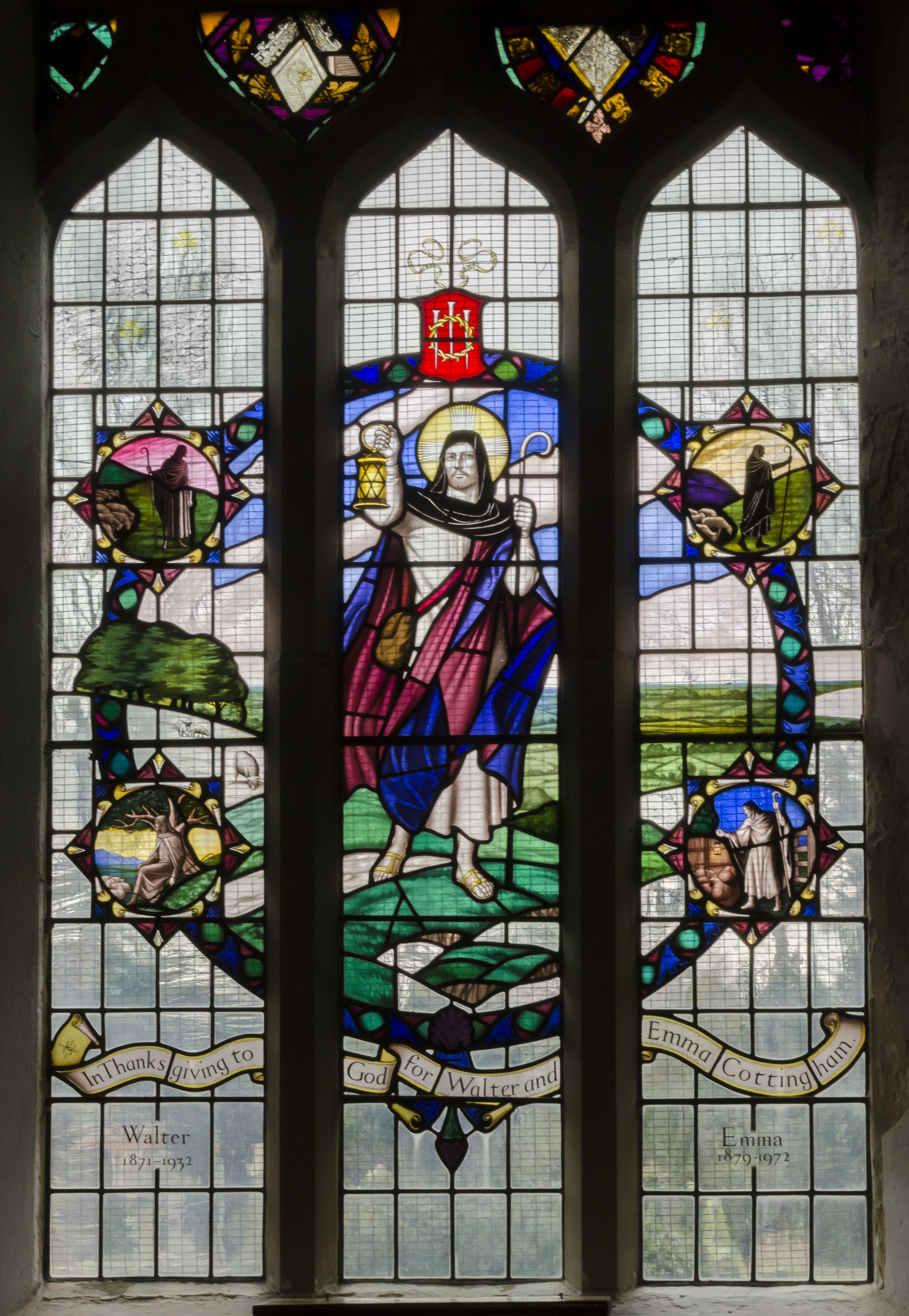
Christ as the Light of the World in Holy Trinity, Messingham, by John Lawson of Goddard & Gibbs, 1972

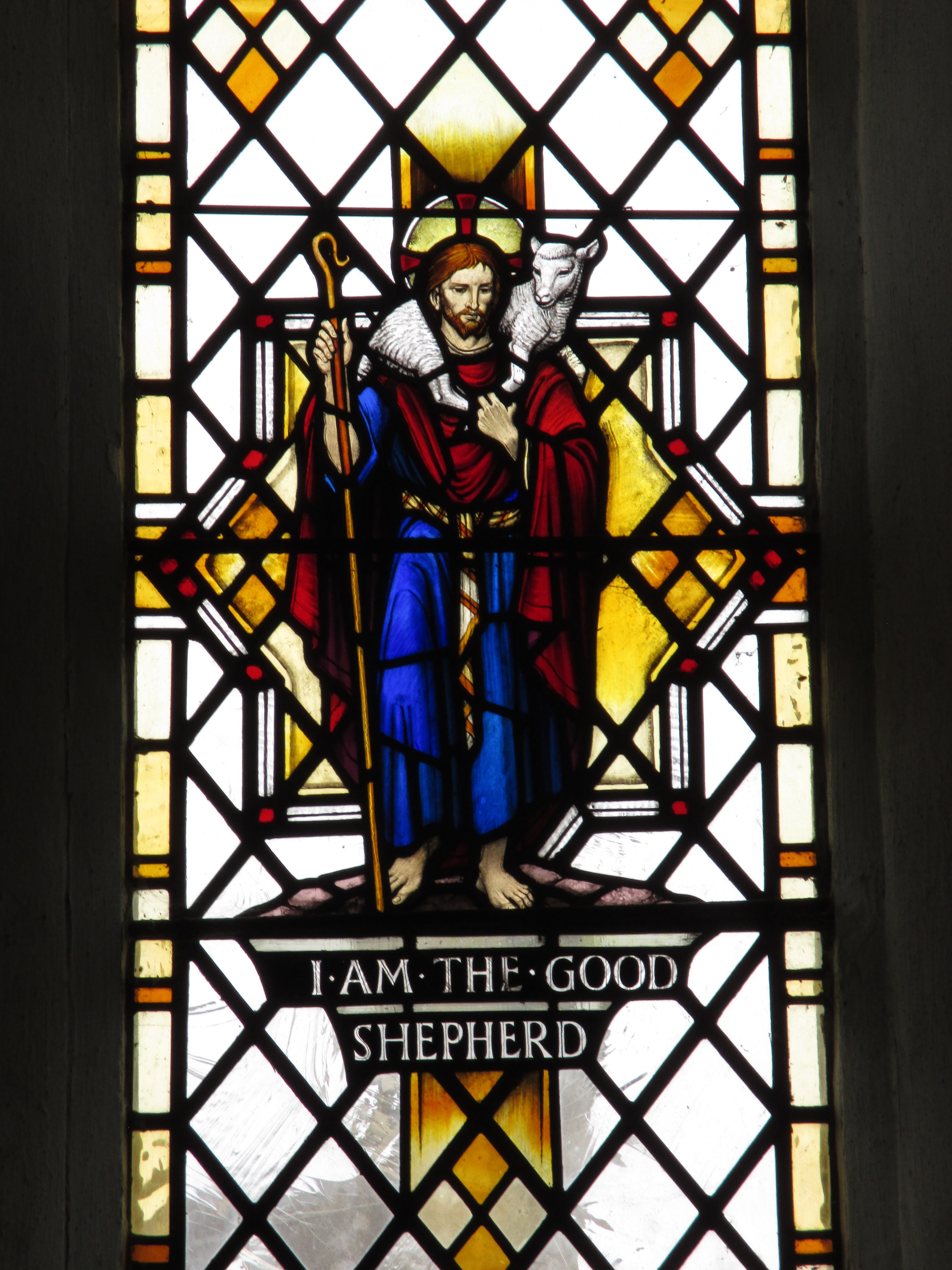
Christ as the Good Shepherd in St Anne's, Lewes, A. E. Buss of Goddard & Gibbs, 1987

== See also ==
- British and Irish stained glass (1811–1918)
