= Rodwell & Martin =

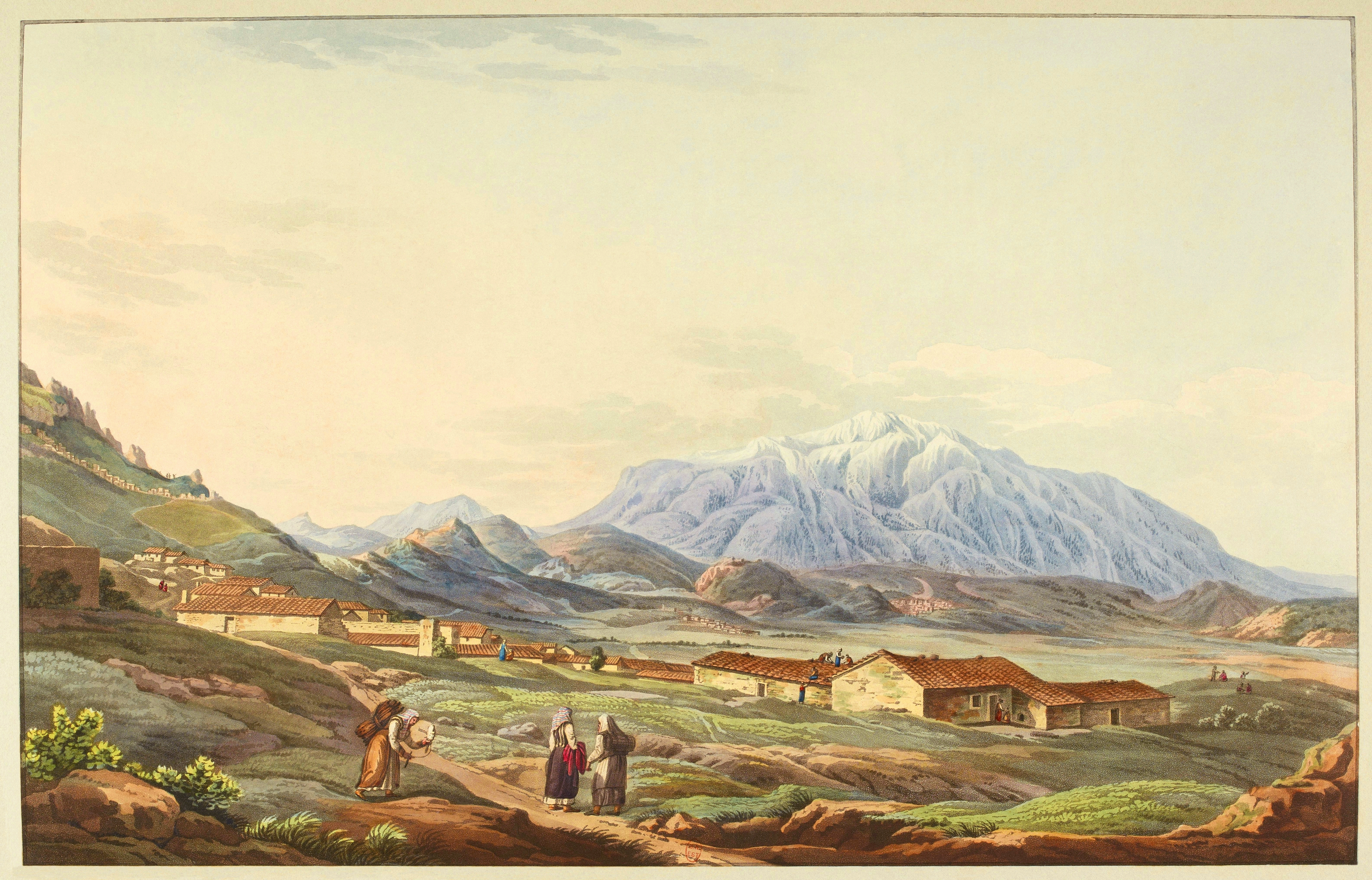
Mount Parnassus, Edward Dodwell, 1821. A print published by Rodwell & Martin.

Rodwell & Martin were early 19th century publishers of topographical prints. The firm was based in New Bond Street, London.

The firm's output included Swiss Scenery by James Pattison Cockburn (1820), Italian Scenery by Elizabeth Frances Batty (1820), Specimens of Ancient Decorations from Pompeii by John Goldicutt (1825), and similar works.
