= St James's Church, Paddington =

St James’ Church, Paddington
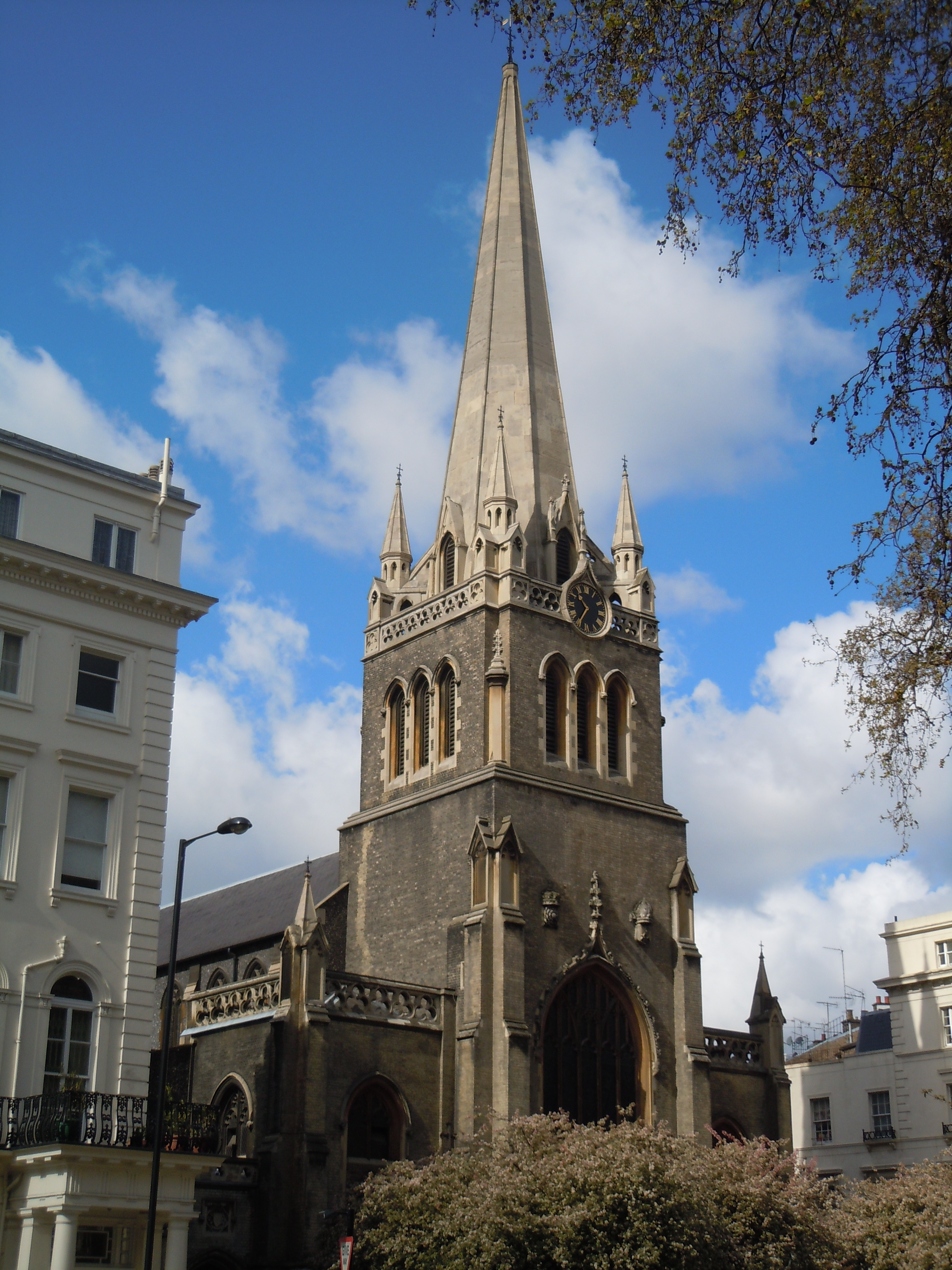
- St James’ Church, Sussex Gardens, Paddington
- St James’ Church, Paddington
- 51°30′46.8″N 0°10′35.4″W
- OS grid reference: TQ 26632 80923
- Location: Paddington
- Country: England
- Denomination: Church of England
- Churchmanship: Anglo-Catholic
- Website: stjamespaddington.org.uk

History
- Dedication: St James the Less

Architecture
- Heritage designation: Grade II* listed
- Architect: George Edmund Street
- Groundbreaking: 1841 and 11 February 1882
- Completed: 1882

Administration
- Province: Canterbury
- Diocese: London
- Archdeaconry: Charing Cross
- Deanery: Westminster Paddington
- Parish: St James Paddington

Clergy
- Bishop: Jonathan Baker (AEO)
- Vicar: Tim Handley

St James' Church Paddington, also known as St James' Church Sussex Gardens, is a Church of England parish church in Paddington, London, in the United Kingdom. It is the parish church of Paddington. It is located at the western end of Sussex Gardens, a long tree-lined avenue about 175 metres (0.109 mi) north of Hyde Park.

== History ==
Until the 1840s, the parish church of Paddington was St Mary's Paddington Green. This building was too small to accommodate its burgeoning congregation, and in 1841–1843 a new church, St James's, was built to accommodate the worshippers and to replace St Mary's as the parish church. The original St James's church was designed by John Goldicutt (c. 1841) but was finished by George Gutch after Goldicutt's death. Goldicutt's original scheme was for a neo-classical design in yellow brick, influenced by his travels in Italy. The yellow brick was used but Gutch changed the style to Gothic.

Within 40 years the congregation had outgrown its church building and an enlarged church was required. The noted Gothic Revival architect G. E. Street planned extensive rebuilding, which involved retaining part of Goldicutt and Gutch's structure and remodelling the church in a 14th-century Gothic style. Unusually, Street reversed the traditional orientation of the church so that the chancel faced west rather than east, as is traditional in church architecture. Street did not live to see his plans for St James's realised as he died on 18 December 1881 before construction started. Two months after Street's death, the Princess Christian of Schleswig-Holstein laid the foundation stone for the new church on 11 February 1882. and the building work was carried out by Sir Arthur Blomfield, an associate of G. E. Street's son, A. E. Street.

On 29 May 1884, the Irish author Oscar Wilde married Constance Lloyd at St James's Church. This event is commemorated with a circular wall plaque which is at the east end of the church. The plaque, commissioned by the Oscar Wilde Society, was designed in Welsh slate by the letter cutter and stone carver Tom Sargeant and unveiled at a ceremony on 29 May 2016 to mark the 132nd anniversary of the wedding.

In 1940 during World War II, St James's Church suffered considerable damage during the Blitz and the church crypt was used as an air-raid shelter. After wartime the bomb damage was repaired and the renovated church was reopened in July 1958 by Princess Marina, Duchess of Kent. Renovations to the church included new stained glass windows by A. E. Buss of Goddard & Gibbs. The Te Deum window at the east end commemorates a selection of notable historical figures who lived in the Parish of St James, including the biologist and inventor of penicillin, Alexander Fleming; the playwright and author of Peter Pan, J. M. Barrie; and the founder of the Scout Association, Lord Baden-Powell. The window also depicts a scene from the Blitz, commemorating those who died during the Battle of Britain.

== Organ ==
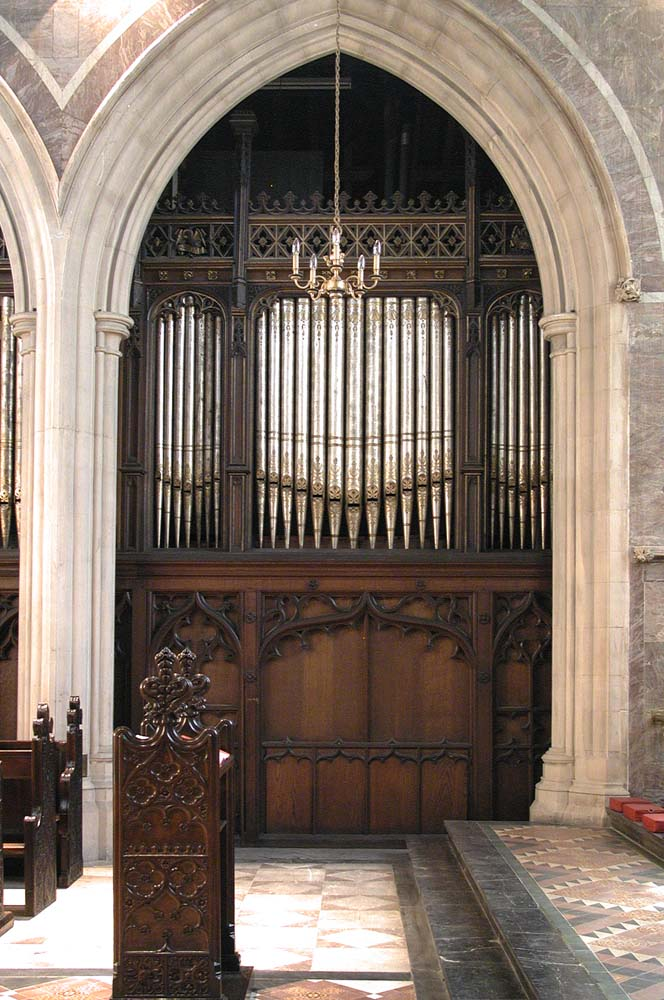
Organ

The organ was built by William Hill & Sons and installed in 1882. The instrument has been rebuilt and revoiced several times in its history; originally the organ was built with three manuals, and in 1908 a fourth manual, the Solo, was added during enlargement work by Hele & Co of Plymouth. It was then rebuilt in 1936 by Rushworth and Dreaper of Liverpool, and again in 1972 by J. W. Walker & Sons Ltd.

A specification of the organ can be found on the National Pipe Organ Register.

=== Organists ===
- 1894-1907: Henry J. B. Dart (1854-1907)
- 1911-16: Harold Darke
- ?-?: George Thalben-Ball
- 2015–present: George de Voil
