= Talbot Square =

Garden square in London

Coordinates: 51.514874°N 0.174565°W

Talbot Square as seen from Sussex Gardens

Talbot Square is a small garden square and cul-de-sac in the Paddington area of London. It is a spur of Sussex Gardens which it connects to at its south.

== History and description ==
Like nearby Norfolk Square the site occupied by the square was formerly the site of a reservoir for the Grand Junction Waterworks Company. The square was therefore the last of the squares laid out in Tyburnia and is also the smallest. Uniquely, the west side of the square hosts the odd addresses and the east the even.

The reservoir was filled in during the 1840s and construction of the houses around the square began in the 1850s with No. 1 occupied by 1855. Most were completed in 1858. The houses of Norfolk and Talbot Square, of later stock and therefore more favourable quality, brought the area to the north of Sussex Gardens in equal standing with the previously more fashionable area to its south. Notable residents of the square include Jack Churchill, brother of Winston Churchill and Shane Leslie, Winston Churchill's cousin who both lived at No. 10.

The northern end of the square suffered bomb damage during the second world war and the houses were replaced by a hotel which is now the University of London's Lilian Penson Hall student accommodation residence. The east and west sides fared better and the surviving original houses are now Grade II listed. The small gardens were opened to the public in 1996 and improvement works were carried out by Westminster Council between 2009 and 2009.
