= Maria C. Hakewill =

British painter and writer

Maria C. Hakewill (née Browne, died 1842) was a British painter and writer.

== Biography ==
Maria Catherine Browne was born in the latter part of the 18th century. She married the architect James Hakewill, whom she accompanied to Italy, where they spent two years, 1816 and 1817. Her novel, Coelebs Suited; or, The Stanley Letters was published in 1812. Hakewill painted portraits and scenes in oil. She exhibited at the Royal Academy, the British Institution, and the Society of British Artists, between 1808 and 1838. She died at Calais in 1842. Children included the sons Henry James, Richard Whitworth, Arthur William, and Frederick Charles, who also painted portraits.

== Bibliography ==
- Bryan, Michael (1904). Bryan's Dictionary of Painters and Engravers (Public domain ed.). Macmillan.
- Gray, Sara (2009). The Dictionary of British Women Artists. Casemate Publishers. ISBN 978-0-7188-3084-7.
