= Edward Charles Hakewill =

English church architect

- Born: 1812
- Died: October 9, 1872
- Occupation: Architect
- Organization: Royal Institute of British Architects
- Known for: Church architecture and restoration
- Notable work: St John of Jerusalem, South Hackney; St Martin at Palace, Norwich
- Style: Gothic architecture
- Parents: Henry Hakewill; Anne Sarah Frith
- Relatives: John Hakewill (grandfather); John Henry Hakewill (brother)

Edward Charles Hakewill FRIBA (1812–1872) was an English church architect, known especially for church restoration in the 19th century.

== Early life ==
Edward Charles Hakewill was born in 1812 to Henry Hakewill, son of painter John Hakewill, and Anne Sarah Frith. His brother, John Henry Hakewill (1810–1880), was also an architect.

Hakewill became a pupil of Philip Hardwick in 1831, remaining until 1838.

== Career ==
Hakewill was a keen student of Gothic architecture.

Hakewill designed the churches of St John of Jerusalem, South Hackney (1845–8), St James's, Clapton, and St Peter's, Thurston. Towards the end of his career he restored St Mary & St Lambert, Stonham Aspal, and churches at Grundisburgh and Wickham Market.

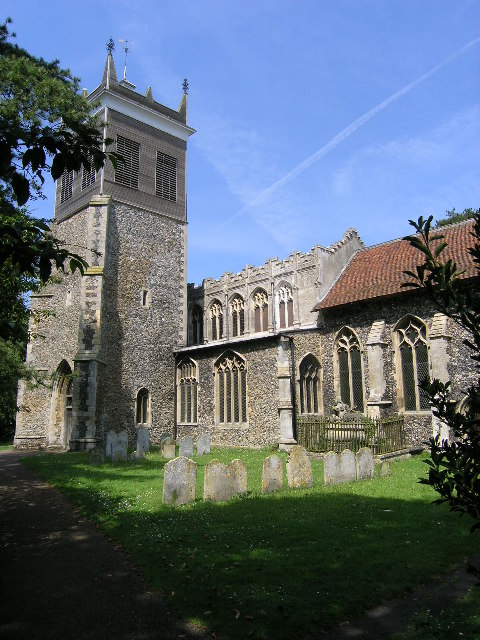
Church of St Mary & St Lambert, Stonham Aspal, designed by Edward Hakewill.

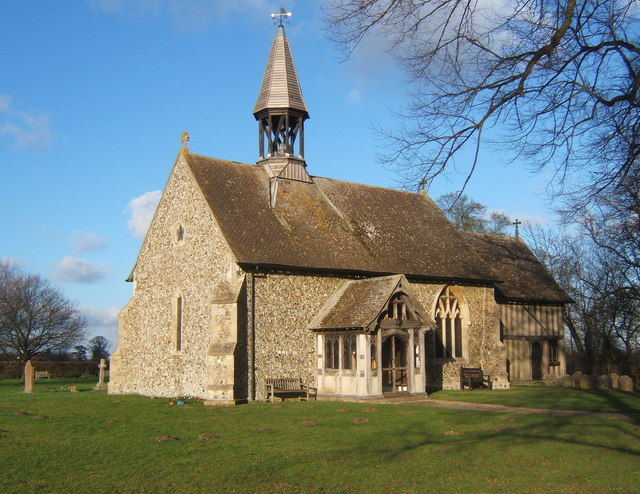
Hakewill designed the nave of All Saints Church, Crowfield.

Hakewill was one of the examiners for candidates for district surveyorships under the Metropolitan Building Act 1843 and was subsequently elected appointed metropolitan district surveyor for the parishes of St Clement Danes, St Mary le Strand and St George Hanover Square.

Hakewill retired in 1867 in Suffolk.

== Death ==
Hakewill died on 9 October 1872.

== Selected publications ==
- The Temple: an Essay on the Ark, the Tabernacle, and the Temple of Jerusalem. 1851
