= Stephen Dykes Bower =

British church architect and Gothic Revival designer

- Born: 18 April 1903; Gloucester, England
- Died: 11 November 1994 (aged 91)
- Education: University of Oxford; Architectural Association School of Architecture
- Occupation: Architect

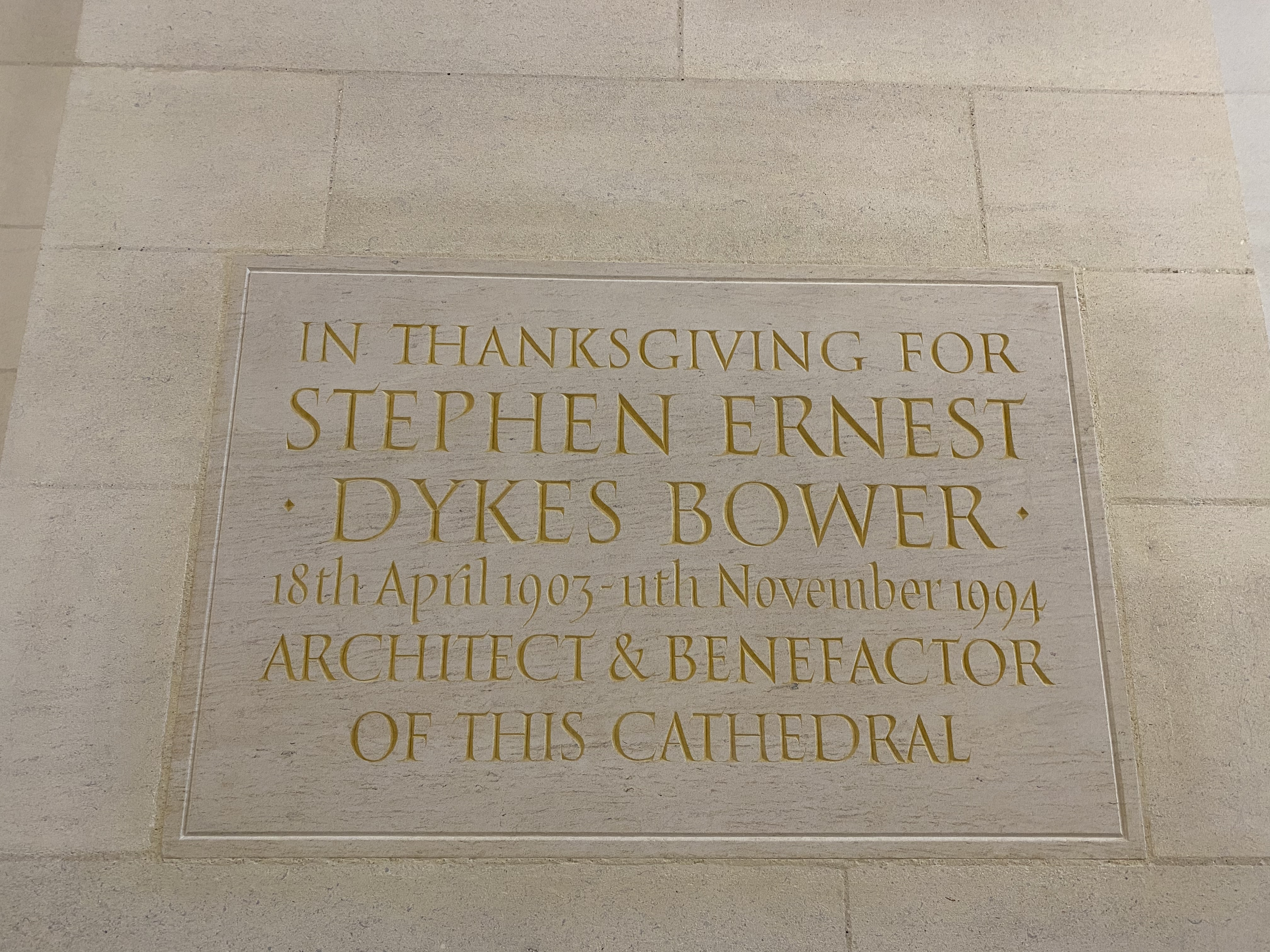
Memorial to Dykes bower at St Edmundsbury Cathedral, Bury St Edmunds

Stephen Ernest Dykes Bower (18 April 1903 – 11 November 1994) was a British church architect and Gothic Revival designer best known for his work at Westminster Abbey, Bury St Edmunds Cathedral and the Chapel at Lancing College. As an architect he was a devoted and determined champion of the Gothic Revival style through its most unpopular years. He rejected modernism and continued traditions from the late Victorian period, emphasising fine detail, craftsmanship and bright colour.

== Early life and education ==
Dykes Bower was born in Gloucester as one of four brothers, including John Dykes Bower, later the organist at St Paul's Cathedral. Stephen was educated as organ scholar at Merton College, Oxford and at the Architectural Association School of Architecture in London. He set up his own practice in 1931, focusing on church building and restoration.

== Surveyor of the Fabric ==
From 1951 to 1973, Dykes Bower was the official Surveyor of the Fabric of Westminster Abbey; in charge of restoring, repairing, and maintaining the interior. Restoration work included the tombs, Pearson-designed organ cases, Blore-designed pulpitum, choir stalls, Scott-designed reredos, vestments, ornaments etc.

== Death ==
Dykes Bower died unmarried in November 1994, and his ashes were interred in the Islip chapel of Westminster Abbey on 12 June 1995. His memorial stone of Purbeck marble is situated next to Sir Charles Peers, his predecessor as Surveyor of the Fabric.

== Major works ==
- All Saints' Church, Hockerill, Hertfordshire, 1937
- St John the Evangelist Church, Newbury, Berkshire, 1950
- St Chad's Church, Middlesbrough, North Yorkshire. Design of church and interior, 1955-1957
- Holy Spirit Church, Southsea, Hampshire: 1958 major rebuild, now substantially altered.
- Norwich Cathedral: the new organ case, furnishing of Norfolk Regiment Chapel, St Saviour's Chapel, restoration of the medieval throne and choir stalls.
- 1958 apse at St Paul's Cathedral including the baldacchino (ciborium), high Altar and American Memorial Chapel executed in association with W. Godfrey Allen
- Priory and Parish Church of St Nicholas, Great Yarmouth: 1961 rebuild of the largest parish church in England after wartime destruction; design of every fitting.
- post-war restoration of Sir Christopher Wren's St Vedast Foster Lane, completed 1962
- St Edmundsbury Cathedral From 1960, an extension of the parish church into a cathedral, including the rebuilding of the chancel and the creation of transepts and side chapels. In his will, he left £2 million towards the building of a tower (completed 2005).
- Completion of Lancing College Chapel including the great rose window, 1977.

== Other works ==
- Carlisle Cathedral: Consulting architect 1947–75; work included the Border Regiment Chapel and general refurnishing.
- various new works and restorations for colleges at Oxford and Cambridge, including University College, Oxford, Merton College, Oxford, Magdalen College, Oxford, Trinity College, Oxford, Queens' College, Cambridge, Magdalene College, Cambridge, St John's College, Cambridge, Corpus Christi College, Cambridge.
- Chelmsford Cathedral: restoration and redecoration.
- Exeter Cathedral: Architect for library and bishop's palace.
- Peterborough Cathedral: silver gospel lights.
- Wells Cathedral: altar rails.
- Christ Church Cathedral, Oxford: embellishment, new altar ornaments and lowering of Bodley-designed reredos.
- Canterbury Cathedral: William Temple Memorial Chapel.
- Gloucester Cathedral: nave altar and ornaments, decoration of Scott-designed reredos, tombs, pulpit, canopy.
- Ely Cathedral: Consulting architect work including restoration of lantern and furnishing of Lady Chapel.
- Rugby School: organ case, grille and fittings in Butterfield-designed chapel.
- St Martin-in-the-Fields: restoration after war damage
- St Mary and St Nicolas, Spalding: painted chancel ceiling.
- Parish church fittings and restorations all over England.
- Church of St Laurence, Hawkhurst: designed the imposing and highly detailed font cover, 1960.
- St Elvan's Church, Aberdare: redecorated chancel, 1961
