= St John the Evangelist Church, Newbury =

Coordinates: 51°23′43.47″N 1°19′32.48″W

St John the Evangelist Church
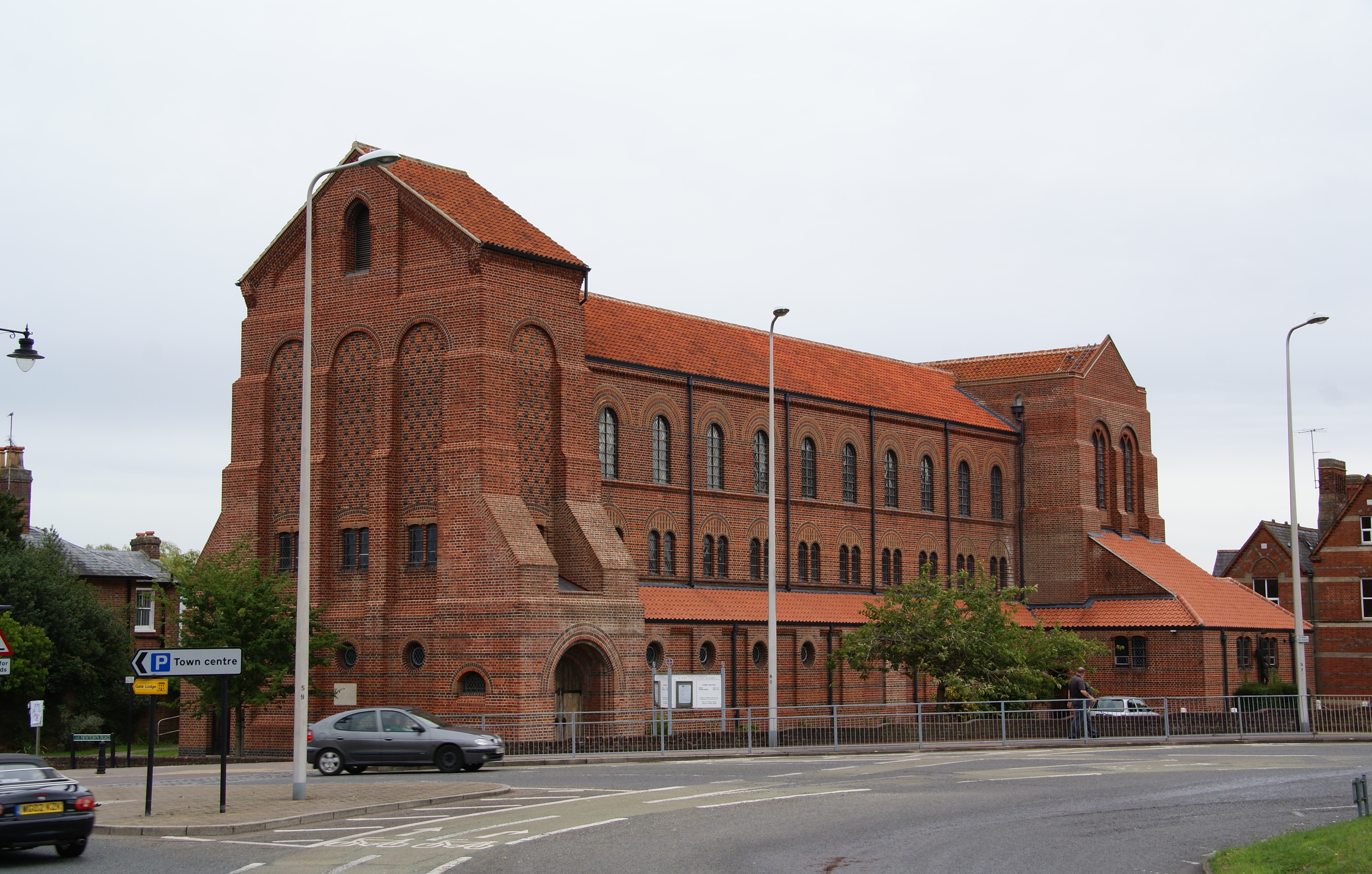
- St John the Evangelist Church
- St John the Evangelist Church
- Location: Newbury
- Country: England
- Denomination: Church of England
- Churchmanship: Anglo-Catholic
- Website: southnewbury.org

History
- Founded: 1859
- Dedication: John the Evangelist

Architecture
- Functional status: Active
- Architect: Stephen Dykes Bower

Administration
- Diocese: Oxford
- Archdeaconry: Berkshire

St John the Evangelist Church is one of four parish churches in the town of Newbury in the English county of Berkshire. It is part of the Benefice of South Newbury, along with the Churches of St George the Martyr, Wash Common and St Michael and All Angels, Enborne.

St John the Evangelist Church is a Progressive and Inclusive church in the Anglo-Catholic Tradition.

== History ==
In 1859 the parish of Saint John was founded and in 1860 was consecrated by the Bishop of Oxford. A church designed by William Butterfield was built, which served the parish until 10 February 1943, when it was destroyed in a German air raid.

After the war, money was raised to build a new church. Designed by Stephen Dykes Bower, it incorporates glass salvaged from the old church and over 750,000 hand-made bricks. Dating from 1955, the sanctuary windows are by AE Buss of Goddard & Gibbs.

The church is Grade II listed.
