= James Hakewill =

English architect

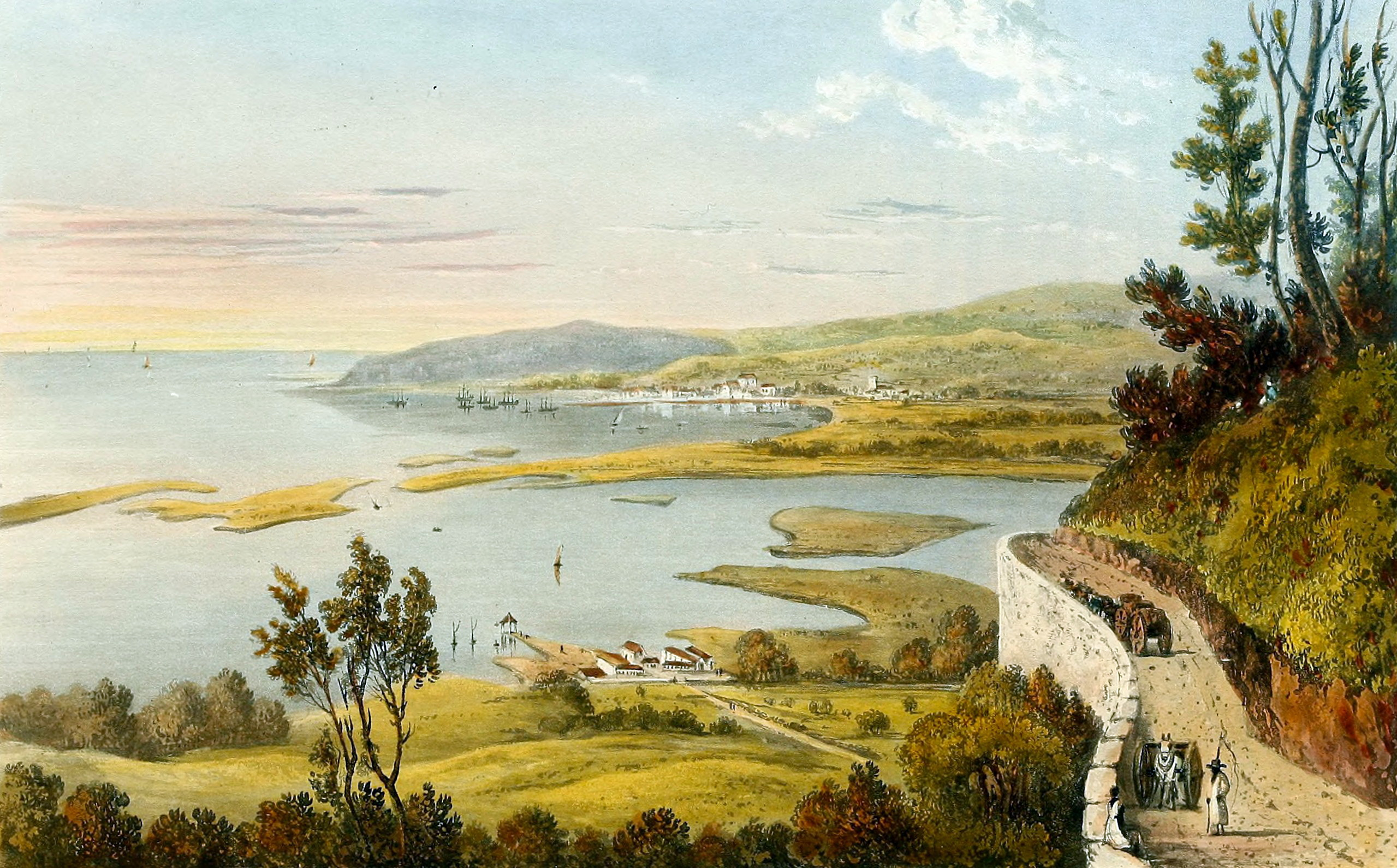
Aquatint of Montego Bay, Jamaica, in A Picturesque Tour of the island of Jamaica, from drawings made in the years 1820 and 1821, by Hakewill.

James Hakewill (1778–1843) was an English architect, best known for his illustrated publications.

== Life ==
The second son of John Hakewill, he was brought up as an architect, and exhibited some designs at the Royal Academy. He was collecting materials for a work on the Rhine when he died in London, 28 May 1843.

== Works ==
In 1813 he published a series of Views of the Neighbourhood of Windsor, &c., with engravings by others from his own drawings. In 1816–17 he travelled in Italy, and on his return published in parts A Picturesque Tour of Italy, in which some of his own drawings were finished into pictures for engraving by J. M. W. Turner. In 1820–1 he visited Jamaica, and subsequently published A Picturesque Tour in the Island of Jamaica, from his own drawings

In 1828 he published Plans, Sections, and Elevations of the Abattoirs in Paris, with considerations for their adoption in London. He also published a small tract on Elizabethan architecture. He was engaged in some works at High Legh and Tatton Park, Cheshire, and in 1836 was a competitor for the erection of the new Houses of Parliament. Hakewill is also supposed to be the author of Cœlebs suited, or the Stanley Letters, in 1812.

== Family ==
In 1807, at St George's, Hanover Square, Hakewill married Maria Catherine, daughter of W. Browne of Green Street, Grosvenor Square, herself a well-known portrait-painter, and a frequent exhibitor at the Royal Academy, who died in 1842. He left four sons, Arthur William, Henry James, Frederick Charles, a portrait-painter, and Richard Whitworth.
