= John Henry Hakewill =

English architect (1810–1880)

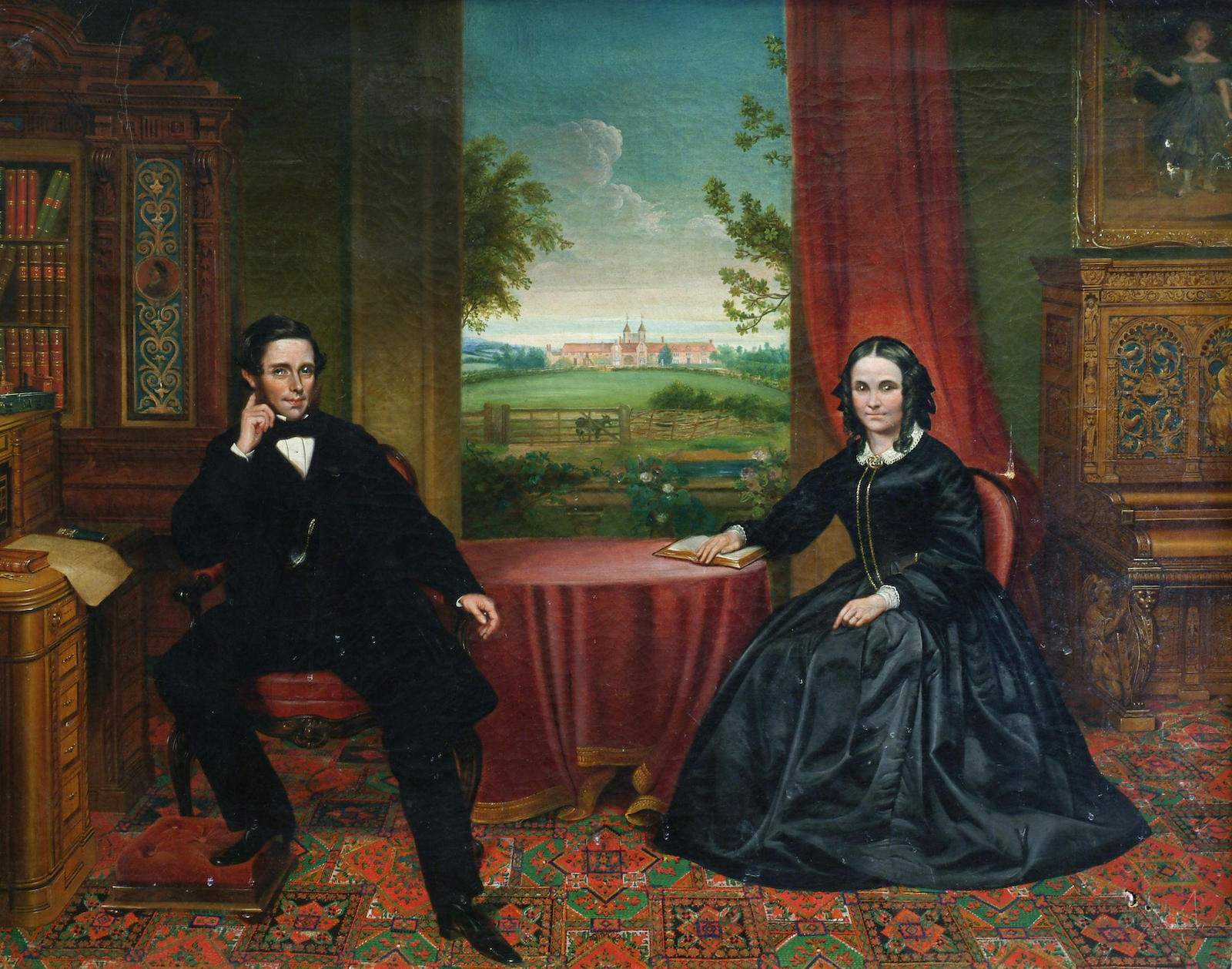
J. Simpson, Portrait of John Henry Hakewill and his wife, seated in their library, their stable block visible through the window. Nineteenth century. Oil on canvas.

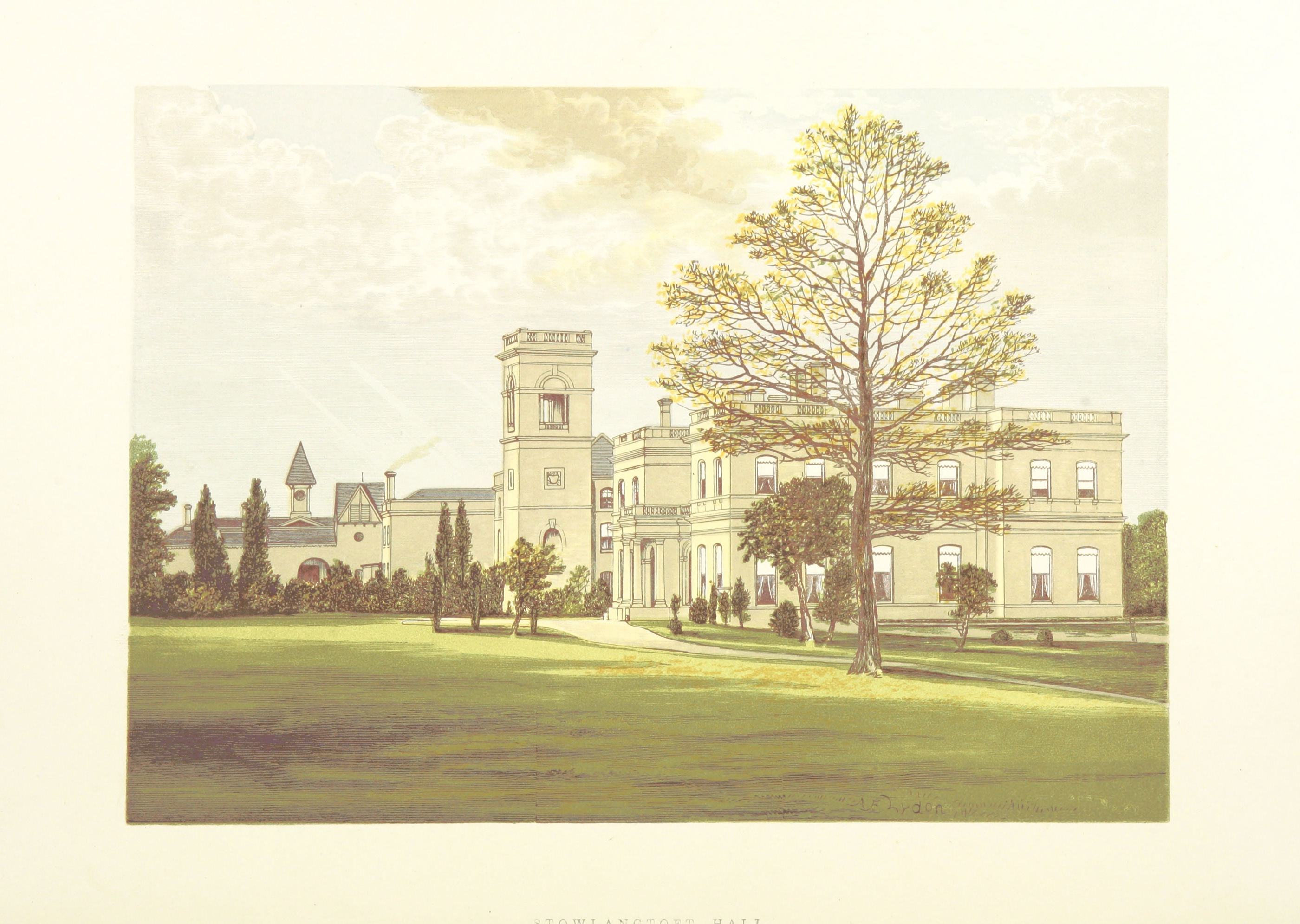
An illustration of Stowlangtoft Hall, Suffolk, designed by Hakewill, from Morris's County Seats, 1879.

John Henry Hakewill (1810–1880) was an English architect. He designed Stowlangtoft Hall in Suffolk and restored many churches and other public buildings in East Anglia, Wiltshire and Nottinghamshire.

== Family ==
Hakewill was the son of Henry Hakewill and Anne Sarah Frith. His brother Edward Charles Hakewill (1816-1872) was also an architect.

== Career ==
J. H. Hakewill was articled to his father and a pupil of John Goldicutt.

Hakewill began to practise in 1838. His first major work was the church of St John of Jerusalem, South Hackney (1845–1848). In 1849 he was commissioned for the reconstruction of St Leonards Church in Wallingford, which he rebuilt in the Gothic Revival style, although he was able to preserve large sections of the original Saxon building. He was the architect of a hospital at Bury St Edmunds, of Stowlangtoft Hall in Suffolk, and of churches in Yarmouth, Wiltshire and Nottinghamshire.

Hakewill published a study, The Temple: an Essay on the Ark, the Tabernacle, and the Temple of Jerusalem, in 1851. He retired to Playford, Suffolk in 1867, but continued to design churches nearby, at Stonham Aspal and Grundisburgh. He was also responsible for Wickham Market Manor.
