= John Hakewill =

English painter and interior decorator

- Born: February 27, 1742
- Died: September 21, 1791
- Occupation(s): Painter and interior decorator
- Spouse: Anna Maria Cook (married 1770 – 1791)
- Children: Henry Hakewill; James Hakewill; George Hakewill

John Hakewill (27 February 1742 – 21 September 1791) was an English painter and interior decorator.

== Life ==
The son of William Hakewill, foreman to James Thornhill, serjeant-painter, and descended from William Hakewill the master of chancery, he was born 27 February 1742. He studied under Samuel Wale, and worked in the Duke of Richmond's gallery.

In 1763 Hakewill gained a premium from the Society of Arts for a landscape drawing, and in 1764 another for a drawing from the antique in the duke's gallery. In 1771 he gained a silver palette for landscape-painting. He exhibited at the Society of Artists exhibition in Spring Gardens a portrait and a conversation piece in 1765, and a landscape in 1766. In 1769, 1772, 1773 he was again an exhibitor, chiefly of portraits.

Hakewill later concentrated on house decoration. He painted decorative works at Blenheim Palace, Charlbury, Marlborough House and Northumberland House, in particular. He died 21 September 1791, of a palsy.

== Family ==
Hakewill married in 1770 Anna Maria Cook, and left eight children surviving (from 15). Three sons, Henry, James, and George, were architects. A daughter Caroline married Charles Smith, by whom she was mother of Edward James Smith (c. 1816 – 21 July 1880), surveyor to the ecclesiastical commissioners.
