= Henry Hakewill =

English architect

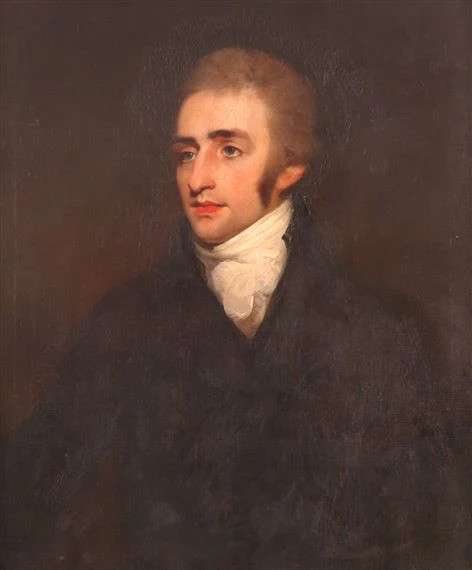
- Henry Hakewill, c. 1795
- Born: October 4, 1771
- Died: March 13, 1830
- Education: Royal Academy
- Occupation: Architect
- Spouse: Anne Sarah (married 1804–1830)
- Children: John Henry Hakewill; Edward Hakewill
- Parents: John Hakewill; Anna Maria Cook

Henry Hakewill (4 October 1771 – 13 March 1830) was an English architect.

== Early life ==
Henry Hakewill was born on 4 October 1771 to English painter and decorator John Hakewill and Anna Maria Cook.

Hakewill was a pupil of John Yenn RA, and also studied at the Royal Academy, where in 1790 he was awarded a silver medal for a drawing of an aspect of Somerset House.

== Career ==
Hakewill began work on a country mansion and eventually had a large and flourishing practice, mostly concerned with country houses. In 1809, he was appointed architect to Rugby School, where the gothic buildings and chapel are his designs. He also did work for the Radcliffe trustees at Oxford and the Middle Temple.

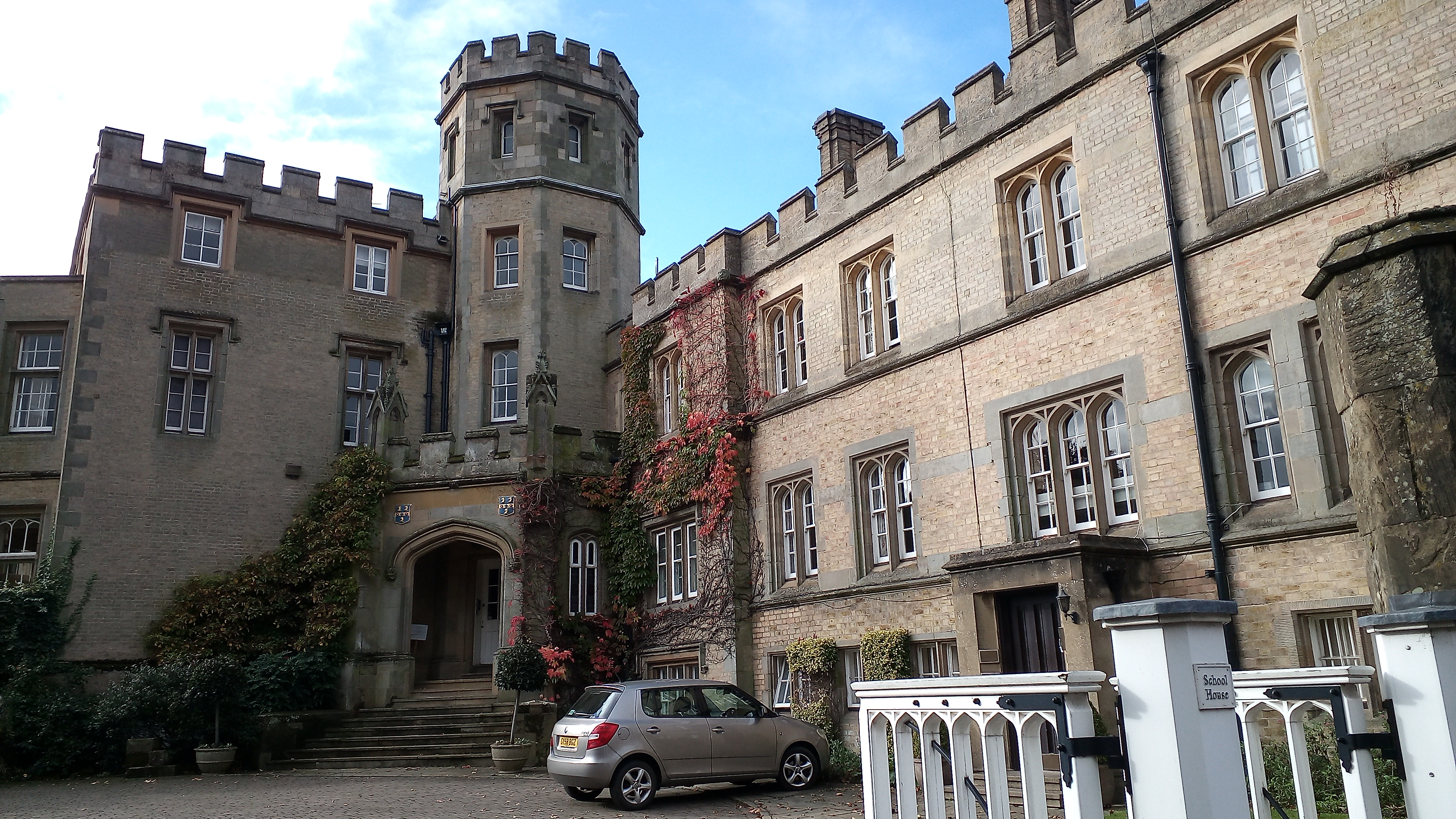
The School House of 1813 at Rugby School; one of Hakewill's designs.

Hakewill designed two notable Greek Revival buildings. Coed Coch, Dolwen, Denbighshire, Wales, a country house with a diagonally-placed portico (now demolished) and stair, was completed in 1804. St Peter's Church, Eaton Square, London was built in 1824–7. (It was rebuilt after a fire in 1987.)

From 1815 to 1816, Hakewill was also commissioned by Farnborough Hall to build a new coach-house and remodel the rose garden and path down to the cascade.

== Personal life ==
On 14 November 1804, Hakewill was married to Anne Sarah Frith, daughter of Rev. Edward Frith of North Cray, Kent. They had seven children including:

- John Henry Hakewill (1810–1880), architect
- Edward Charles Hakewill (1816–1872), architect

== Publications ==
- An account of the Roman villa discovered at Northleigh Oxfordshire in the years 1813, 1814, 1815, 1816. 1823.
