= Sussex Gardens =

Street in Central London

Coordinates: 51.5157°N 0.1718°W

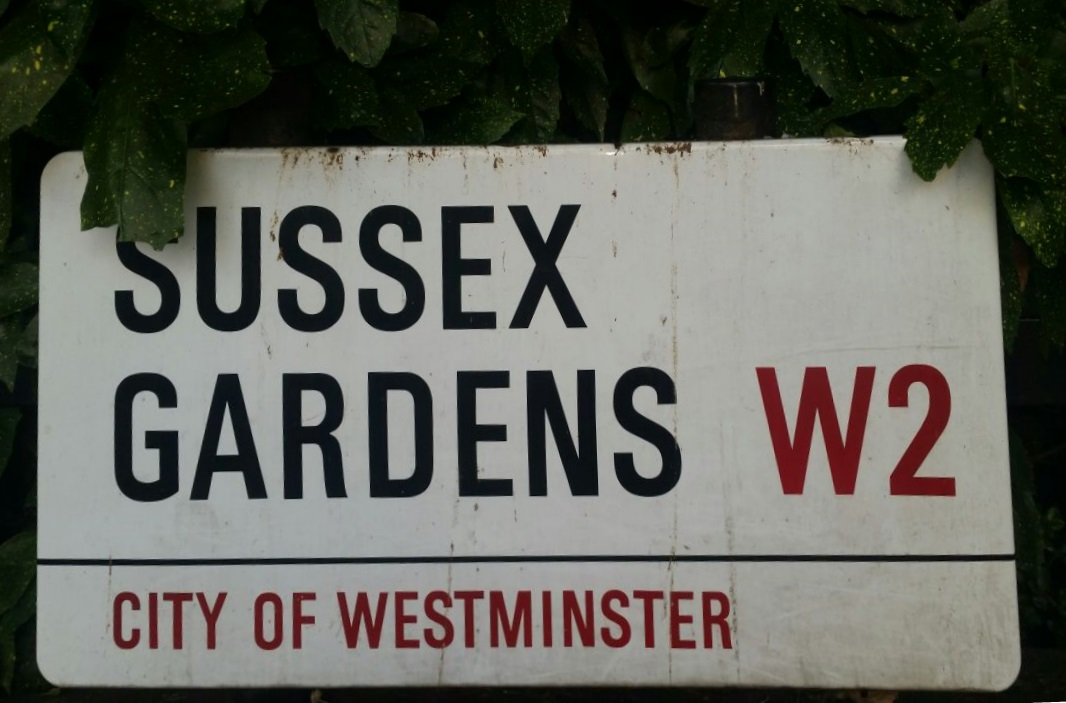
Street sign.

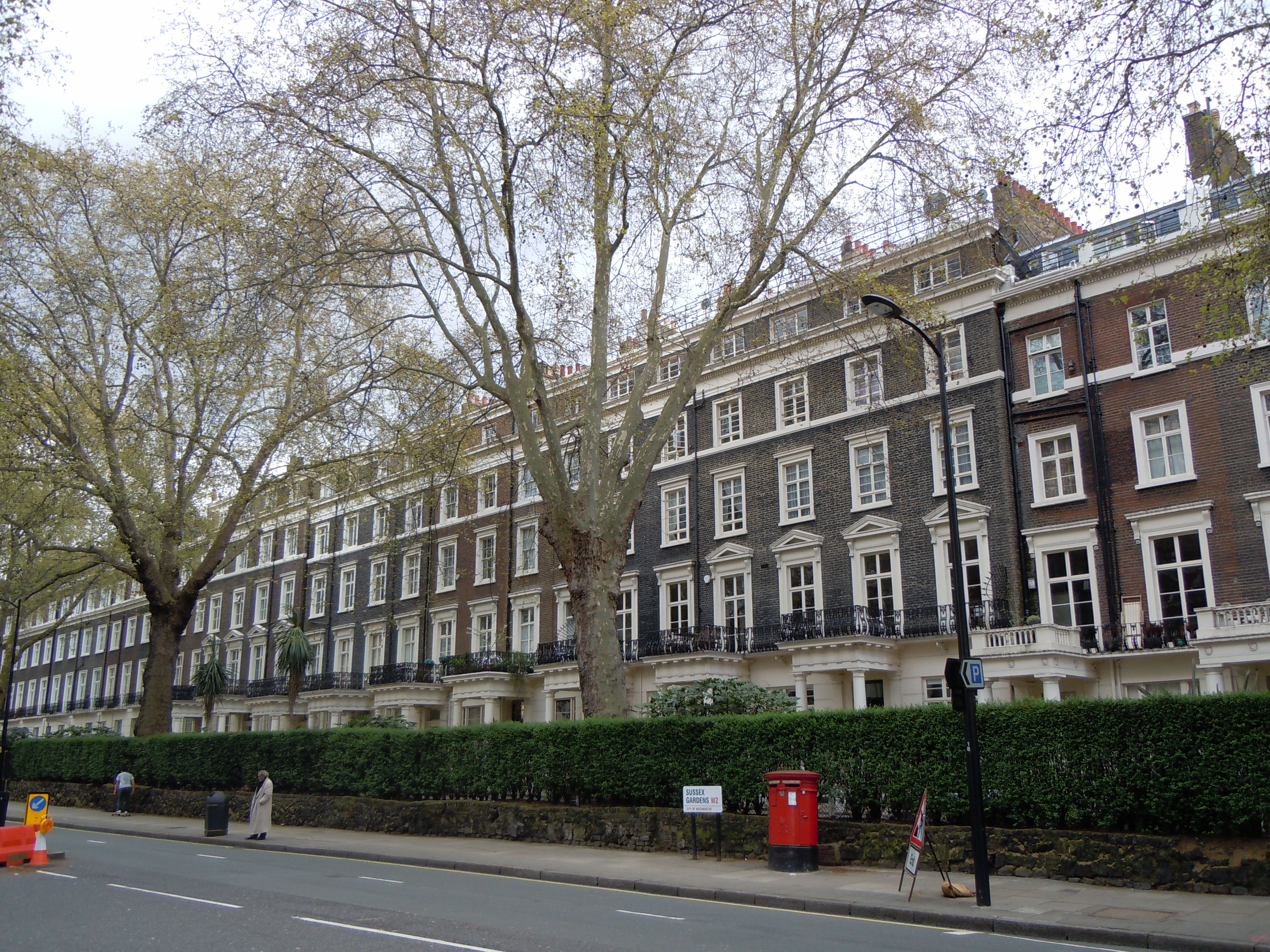
The street features a number of terraced houses.

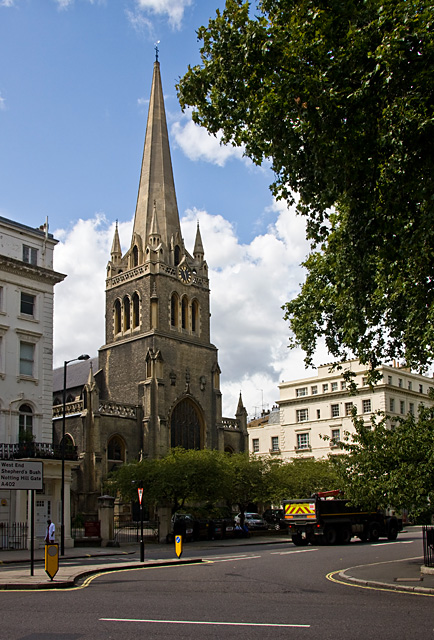
St James's Church viewed from Sussex Gardens.

Sussex Gardens is a street in Paddington in Central London. It runs westwards from the Edgware Road, for most of the way as a broad avenue until it reaches an area near Lancaster Gate where it becomes a garden square. Part of the City of Westminster, it is located in the residential area of Tyburnia north of Hyde Park. Streets running off it include Westbourne Terrace, Talbot Square, London Street and Southwick Street. Sussex Gardens provides the main axis for the area.

The street was originally known as Grand Junction Street, named after the nearby Grand Junction Waterworks. It was laid out as part of the ambitious street plan for Tyburnia in 1809, designed by the architect Samuel Pepys Cockerell. Delays, partly caused by the Panic of 1825, meant that the street was not fully completed until the early Victorian era to a revised plan by George Gutch. The first houses were available for lease in 1826 at the Edgware Road end. The space in between it and the Uxbridge Road to the south was half laid out by 1839. Before long the street and surrounding terrain was a fashionable residential centre. St James's Church was constructed as the new parish church of Paddington, the current building of today designed in 1881–82 largely replacing an earlier building established in the early 1840s. By the 20th century, the street had become known for the large number of boarding houses and hotels located on it.

Originally 4 lanes of motor traffic, in 2017 the road was reduced to 2 lanes of motor traffic and 2 dedicated cycle lanes. More recently the cycle lanes have had “tulip wands” installed experimentally to better separate them from normal motor traffic.

Like the nearby Sussex Square, Sussex Place and Sussex Mews, it derives its name from the title of the Duke of Sussex, the younger brother of George IV and William IV.

== Bibliography ==
- Cherry, Bridget & Pevsner, Nikolaus. London 3: North West. Yale University Press, 2002.
- Cockburn, J. S., King, H. P. F. & McDonnell, K. G. T. & A History of the County of Middlesex. Institute of Historical Research, 1989.
- Porter, Roy. London, a Social History. Harvard University Press, 1998.
- Rosen, Barbara & Zuckermann, Wolfgang. The Mews of London: A Guide to the Hidden Byways of London's Past. Webb & Bower, 1982.
- White, Jerry. London in the Nineteenth Century. Random House, 2016.
