= Connacht (disambiguation) =

Connacht or Connaught is a western province in Ireland.

Connacht or Connaught may also refer to:

== Places ==
- Connaught Hill, a community park in Prince George, British Columbia
- Connaught Cadet Training Centre, in Ottawa, Ontario, Canada
- Connaught Village, a neighbourhood in central London
- Republic of Connacht, a short-lived republic located in Connacht province in 1798
- Rural Municipality of Connaught No. 457, a rural municipality in Saskatchewan, Canada
- Taman Connaught, a township in Kuala Lumpur, Malaysia
- Connaught Place (disambiguation), several places
- Connaught Park (disambiguation), several places
- Connaught, Ontario (disambiguation), several places in Ontario, Canada

== Schools ==
- Connacht Ulster Technological University
- Connaught School for Girls, a secondary school in Leytonstone, England
- The Connaught School, the former name of Alderwood School in Aldershot, England

== Buildings ==
- Connaught Armoury, a building in Edmonton, Alberta, Canada
- Connaught Barracks, Dover, an army installation at Dover, England
- Connaught Battery, harbour defences in Nova Scotia
- Connaught Bridge Power Station, a generating station in Selangor, Malaysia
- Connaught Building, a building in Ottawa
- Connaught Hall (disambiguation), two English university halls of residence
- Connaught Hospital, a hospital in Sierra Leone
- Connaught Rooms, hotel and conference centre in London, England
- Connaught Theatre, a former cinema in Worthing, England
- Old Connaught House, a house in Dublin
- Royal Connaught Hotel, a building in Hamilton, Ontario, Canada
- The Connaught (hotel), a five-star hotel in London, England
- The Connaught (Sydney), a landmark residential apartment building in Sydney, Australia

== Streets ==
- Connaught Drive, a road in Singapore
- Connaught Place (disambiguation), a location in several cities
- Connaught Road on the north shore of Hong Kong Island
- Connaught Street, a street in Central London
- Connaught Square, a square in Westminster, London
- Connaught Square (Thunder Bay), a square in Thunder Bay, Canada

== Companies and corporations ==
- Connaught Laboratories, a company now part of Sanofi Pasteur vaccines company
- Connaught Motor Company, a British manufacturer of high performance road cars
- Connaught plc, a UK company operating in the social housing, public sector and compliance markets

== Sport ==
- Connaught (horse) (1965-1987), a thoroughbred racehorse trained in Britain
- Connaught Cup (disambiguation), several Canadian sporting competitions
- Connaught Engineering, a British Formula One and sports car constructor of the 1950s
- Connacht GAA, the provincial council governing Gaelic games in the Irish province
- Connaught Park Racetrack, a horse-racing track at Aylmer, Quebec
- Connacht Rugby, either the governing body for rugby union in the Irish province, or its senior team which competes in the Magners League
- Royal Connaught Boat Club, a watersports club in Pune, India

== People ==
- Prince Arthur, Duke of Connaught and Strathearn (1850–1942), third son of Queen Victoria
- Prince Arthur of Connaught (1883–1938), only son of the 1st Duke, predeceased his father
- Alastair Windsor, 2nd Duke of Connaught and Strathearn (1914–1943), only child of Prince Arthur of Connaught, died unmarried and without issue

== Transport ==
- RMS Connaught (1897), a mail and passenger steamship built in 1897, torpedoed in World War I
- Connaught Road railway station, a former east London station
- Connaught Tunnel, a railway tunnel in British Columbia
- SS Duke of Connaught, several steamships

== Other uses ==
- Connacht, a major character in the Myth computer game series
