= Porchester Square =

Residential square in Central London

Coordinates: 51.5177°N 0.1872°W

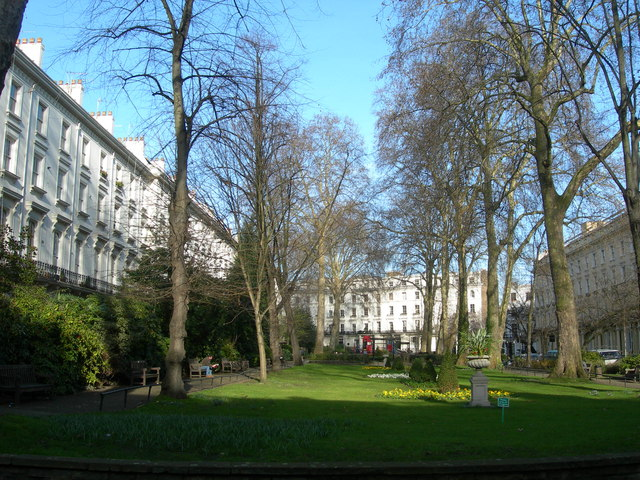
- Porchester Square Gardens and the two long white fronts: the surviving original terraces.

- Porchester Square (City of Westminster) (local authority since 1965)
- Part of: "Tyburnia" (loosely associated with)
- Type: Garden square
- Length: 575 ft (175 m) (average length as tapers)
- Width: 145 feet (44 m)
- Area: Bayswater / Westbourne
- Location: London,
- Postal code: W2

Construction
- Construction start: 1850
- Completed: 1855-58

Other
- Designer: George Gutch (as to reviews and ratification)
- Known for: "Tyburnia" (as to reviews and ratification)
- Status: N. and E. sides: Grade II listed

Porchester Square is an archetypal-format, narrow London garden square in Bayswater on the cusp of inter-related Westbourne. It is lined with tall white Victorian classical architecture residential buildings.

It is half of one large block south of the closing section of the Great Western Main Line that leads into London Paddington station.

== History ==
=== Etymology ===
Successive heads of the Thistlewaites, whose seat was Portchester Castle in Hampshire, were foremost of three to four co-trustees of the Bishop of London's majority landholding of Paddington. This was throughout conversion from agricultural dominance to controlled urban housing: before 1750 until building began on this particular plot in 1850. Their manor was agreed as acceptable for three roads that survive and Porchester Square at the time.

=== Development ===
Eight building firms were used, resulting in slightly different exteriors of the large houses (now internally all converted into flats). Classical features are:

- porticoed steps to the front doors
- sash windows
- first floor juliet balconies with wrought iron railings
- multiple cornices
- roofline balustrades.

The terrace of houses on the northern side of the square back onto the garden, without an intervening road, in the manner of at least three other nearby squares. (Note: Prince's with Leinster Square, northern Ennismore Gardens and Gloucester Square) As a consequence of this formation, these northern houses front a road with two names - Porchester Square on its southern side; Gloucester Terrace on its northern.

The houses on the south side, keeping their façades and much of their internal structure, have been incorporated into an award-winning wider private development of flats and commercial premises since the mid-1970s, The Colonnades. This development was one of the first major projects of architects whose status later grew, Sir Terry Farrell and Sir Nicholas Grimshaw.

The central gardens of the square which are open to the public. It has large, well-rooted, tall London plane (Platanus × hispanica) trees, flowering cherry trees, extensive lawns, colourful flower beds and a children's playground.

Begun in 1850 and completed between 1855 and 1858, the square was one of the last areas of Bayswater and Westbourne built. The dominant architect was George Wyatt, but the final word on both the general layout and the architectural detail was with George Gutch who in 1822 as surveyor of Bishop of London's then intrinsically Paddington lands reviewed and ratified all developments. At the outset of building the area was considered in the parish and soon the Metropolitan Borough of Paddington. In 1965 the authority became the City of Westminster which took the borough as its northern part, dissolving it.

The architectural facades of the classical terrace, facing onto Porchester Square Garden, now incorporated into the Colonnades development, were carefully refurbished in 2020 by the freeholders.

== Recognition with protection ==
In the mainstream, initial category for protection and recognition are the original two sides which survive. These are the north (No.s9 to 31) and east (No.s1 to 8).

== Footnotes and citations ==
Notes

Citations
