= Albion Street, London =

Street in Central London

Coordinates: 51.51342°N 0.16675°W

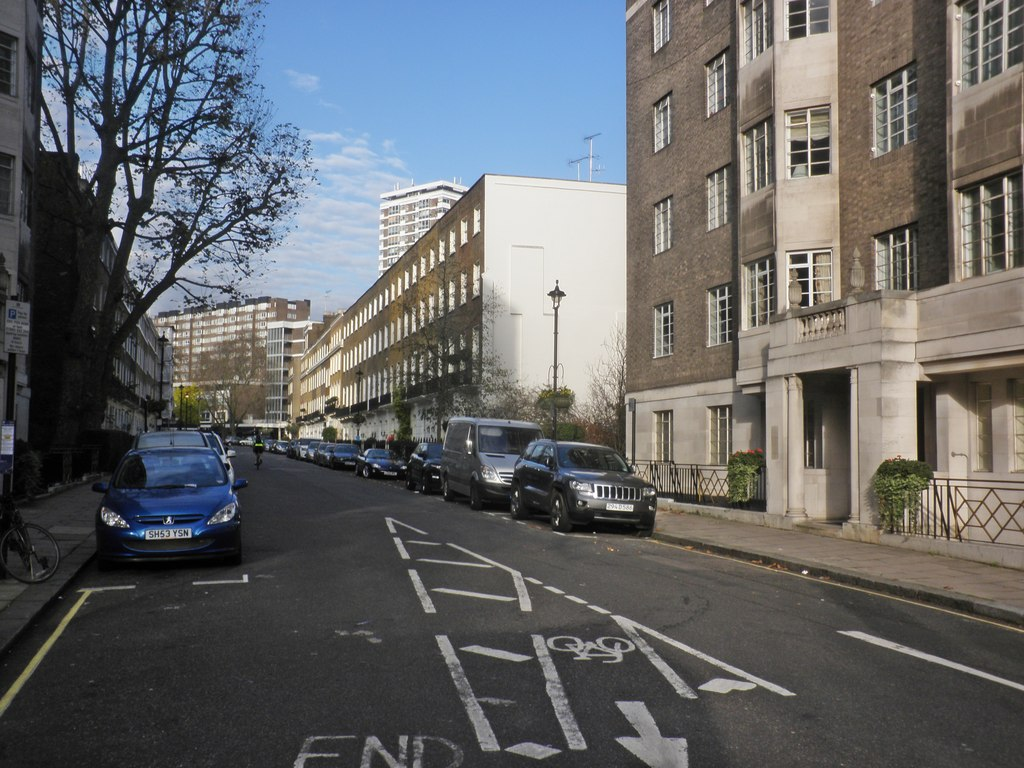
Looking northwards. One of the 1930s apartment blocks in the foreground and the Regency terraces further back.

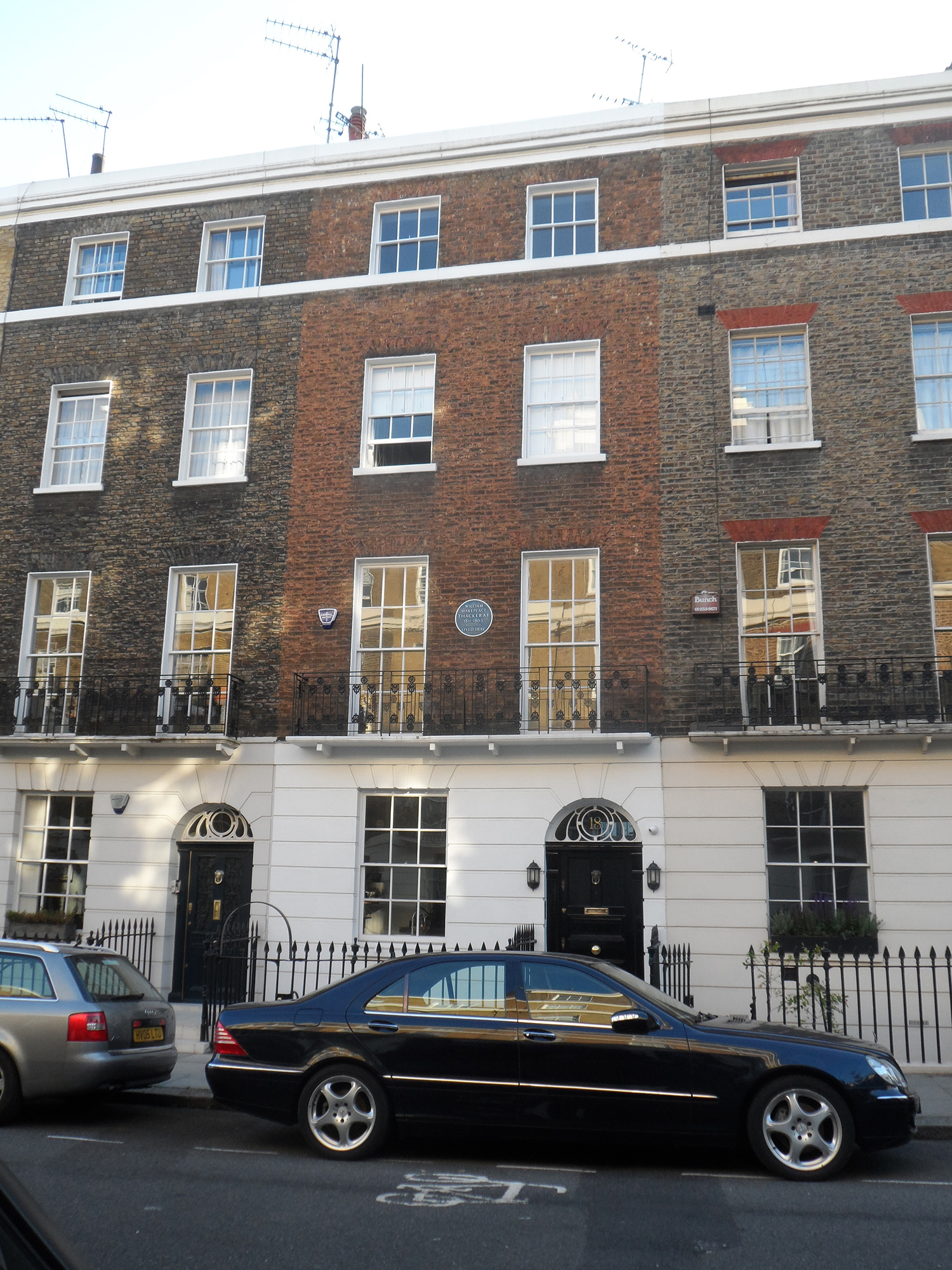
House featuring a blue plaque commemorating author William Makepeace Thackeray.

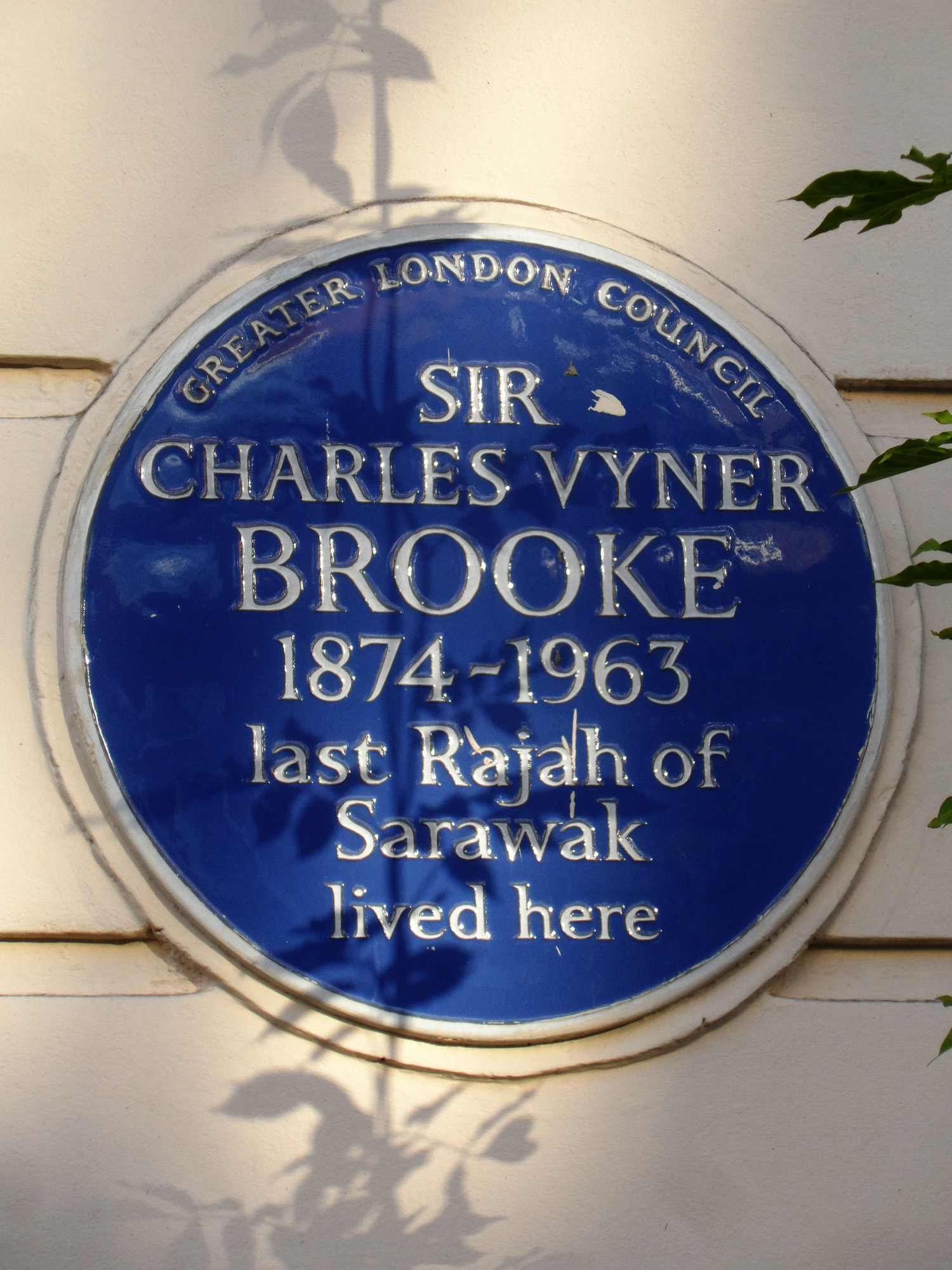
Blue plaque for Charles Vyner Brooke, the last Rajah of Sarawak.

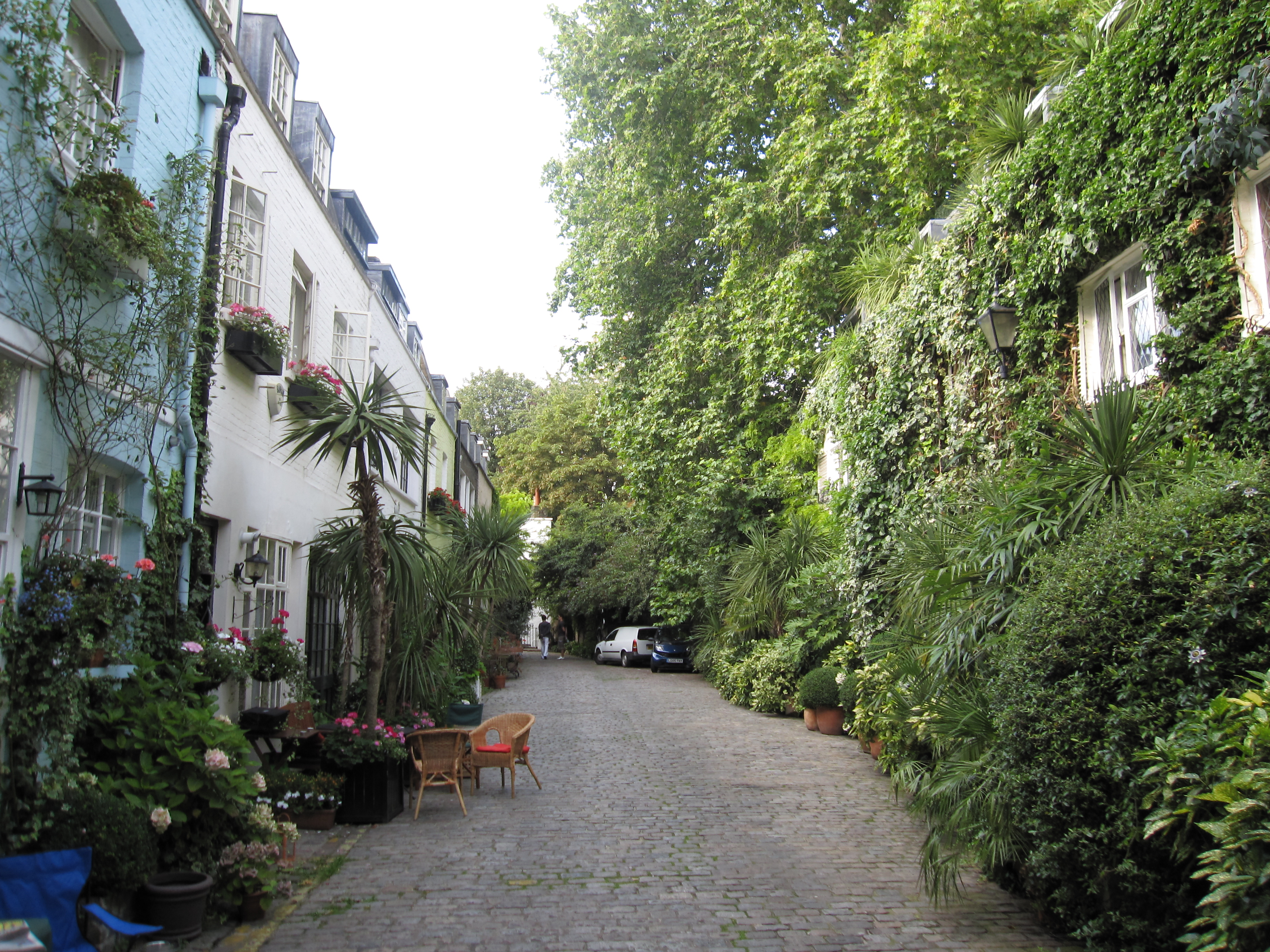
Albion Mews, a mews which runs off Albion Street.

Albion Street is a residential street located in the City of Westminster. Part of the Tyburnia area, it runs southwards from Connaught Street to the Bayswater Road on the edge of Hyde Park. It is notable for its Regency architecture.

== History ==
Albion Street was laid out in the 1820s as part of a long-term plan the architect Samuel Pepys Cockerell to develop the Hyde Park Estate, then on the outskirts of London, into a fashionable residential area called Tyburnia. After Cockerell's death in 1827 George Gutch took over the project, and it is likely he designed the houses that stand in the street, constructed from around 1830. Nearby Connaught Street and Connaught Square were both built around the same time but progress was much slower on the rest of Tyburnia, which wasn't completed until well into the early Victoria era.

== Landmarks ==
Many of the terraced buildings in the street are now Grade II listed. In the mid-1930s, the two corners at the southern end of the street were demolished and replaced with large Art Deco apartment blocks known as Albion Gate. Designed by the architect Septimus Warwick they use Portland stone as well as brick and were completed in 1936. The smaller Albion Close and Albion Mews run off the street to the west and east respectively. St George's Fields, once the Georgian era burial ground of St George's, Hanover Square, is located to the east of the street.

== Notable residents ==
Notable residents have included the Victorian writer William Makepeace Thackeray and Charles Vyner Brooke, the third and last Rajah of Sarawak both of whom are now commemorated by blue plaques. The Austrian-born potter Lucie Rie had her studios in Albert Mews and this is also commemorated by a blue plaque.

== Bibliography ==
- Aldous, Tony. A Prospect of Westminster: The Continuing Development of this Historic City.
- Bebbington, Gillian. London Street Names. Batsford, 1972.
- Cherry, Bridget; Pevsner, Nikolaus (2002). London. 3: North West. Harmondsworth: Penguin Books. ISBN 0300096526.
- Hibbert, Christopher Weinreb, Ben, Keay, John & Keay, Julia. The London Encyclopaedia. Pan Macmillan, 2011.
- White, Jerry. London in the Nineteenth Century: 'a Human Awful Wonder of God'. Random House, 2016.
