= Hyde Park Estate =

Residential district in London

Coordinates: 51.514°N 0.168°W

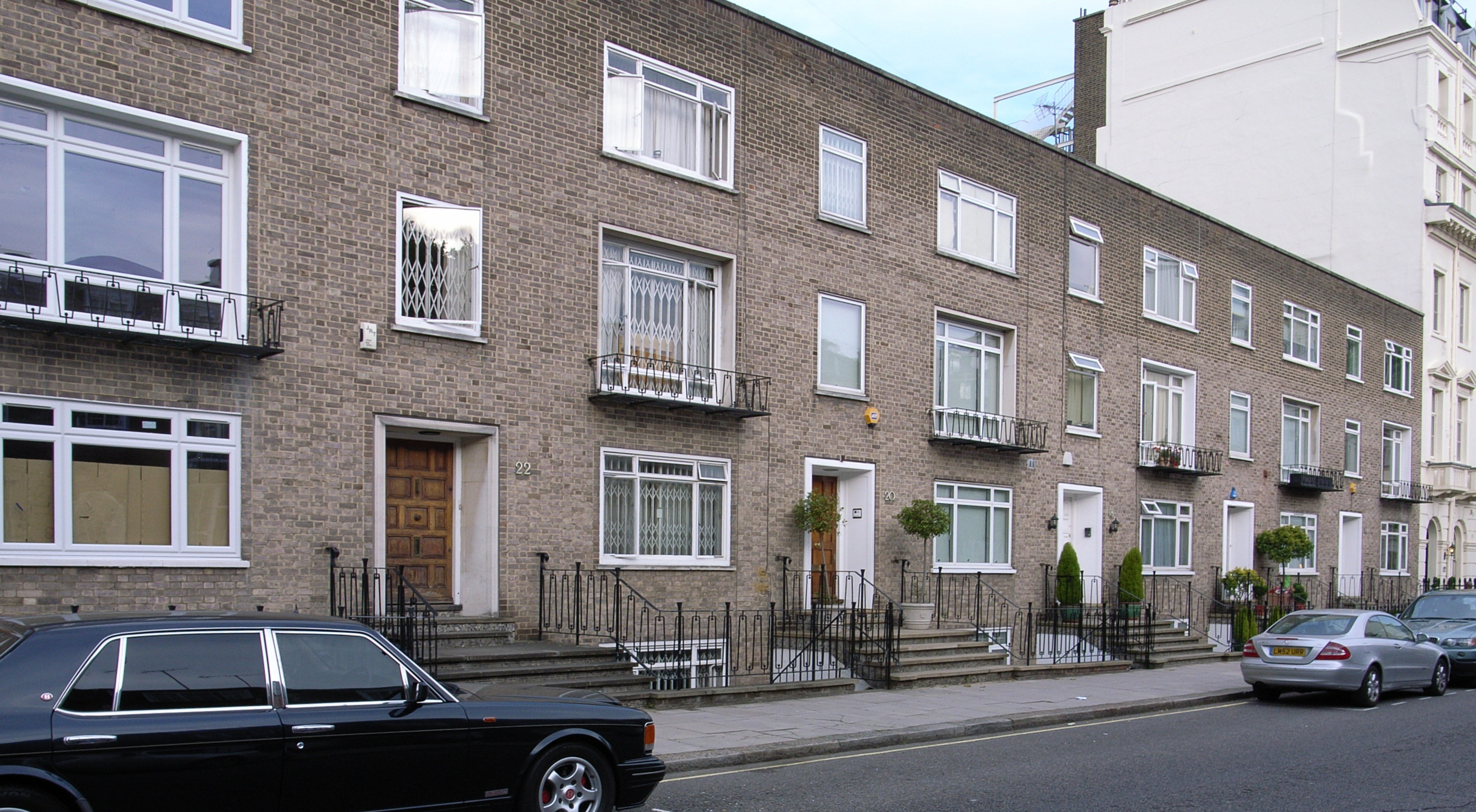
14-24 Hyde Park Street

The Hyde Park Estate is a residential district in the Paddington area of London. It is an affluent area, characterised by a layout of squares and crescents, and is home to several embassies, prestigious businesses and celebrities.

== Location ==
The estate covers a triangular area, centred on Hyde Park Square, roughly located south-east of Sussex Gardens, west of the Edgware Road and north of Bayswater Road, between Lancaster Gate and Marble Arch.

It includes Connaught Square and Connaught Village, The Water Gardens, Burwood Place, Norfolk Crescent and the church of St John's, Hyde Park.

== History ==
The Hyde Park Estate was developed in the nineteenth century on land owned by the Bishop of London and was originally known as the Paddington Estate. Ownership then passed to the Church Commissioners who remain the primary freeholders of the estate.

After World War II, following extensive wartime bomb damage, the Church Commissioners rebuilt parts of the estate in partnership with the building firm Wates, introducing high density blocks of flats with underground car parking among the Victorian villas.

In September 2014, residents of 1 Hyde Park Street chose to take ownership of the Grade II listed building on the corner of Bayswater Road. A major refurbishment programme was then undertaken to address alleged historical underinvestment.

== Notable residents ==
Past residents include:

- Hertha Ayrton, physicist: Norfolk Square
- Michael Balfe, composer: Seymour Street
- Tony Blair, former prime minister: Connaught Square
- Lady Violet Bonham-Carter, politician and writer: 43 Gloucester Square
- Sir Charles Vyner Brooke, Last Rajah of Sarawak: 13 Albion Street
- Michael Caine, actor: Albion Close
- Lord Randolph Churchill, statesman: 2 Connaught Place
- Alan A. Freeman, record producer: 222 Park West, Edgware Road
- Olive Schreiner, author: 16 Portsea Place
- Robert Stephenson, engineer: 33 Gloucester Square
- Marie Taglioni, ballerina: 14 Connaught Square
- William Makepeace Thackeray, author: 18 Albion Street
- Quentin Willson, motoring journalist (Top Gear): Hyde Park Gardens Mews
