= Gloucester Terrace =

Street in Central London

Coordinates: 51.51689°N 0.18643°W

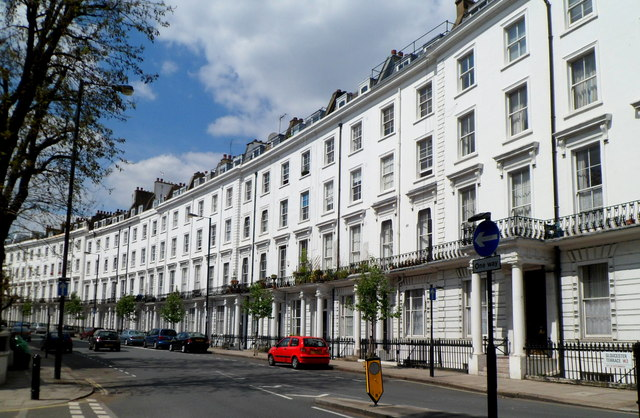
Typical row of white stucco terraced housing.

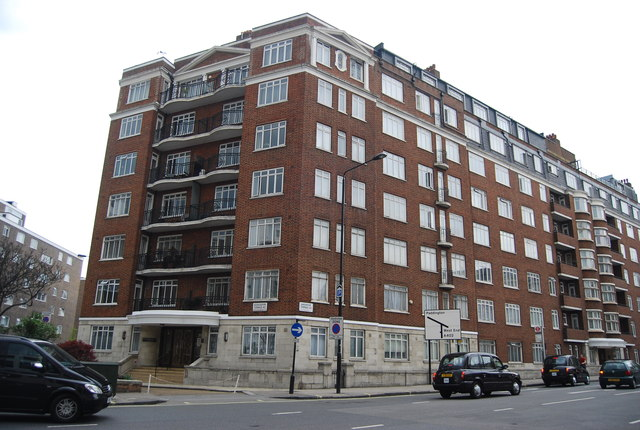
Apartment block where Gloucester Terrace joins Lancaster Terrace.

Gloucester Terrace is a street in Central London in the vicinity of Paddington and Bayswater. Located in the City of Westminster, it runs northwards from Lancaster Terrace near to Lancaster Gate tube station and Hyde Park before curving round to meet Porchester Square around Westbourne. The southern section is close to the border between Tyburnia and Bayswater. It intersects with Craven Road, Chilworth Street, Cleveland Terrace, Bishop's Bridge Road and Orsett Terrace. Its northern section is close to the Great Western Main Line and Westway. Westbourne Terrace runs directly parallel to the east.

The street was developed in the early Victoria era, with white stucco terraces that are characteristic of the wider area. The plans for the area had been laid out in 1827 by George Gutch, based on an earlier conception by Samuel Pepys Cockerell. Gloucester Terrace was designed largely by the architects William Kingdom and William King. The Hallfield Estate to the west of Gloucester Terrace, is a modernist addition built after the Second World War.

== Notable occupants ==
- Brand Sapte
- Anne Parsons, Countess of Rosse

== Bibliography ==
- Bebbington, Gillian. London Street Names. Batsford, 1972.
- Cherry, Bridget & Pevsner, Nikolaus. London 3: North West. Yale University Press, 2002.
- Cockburn, J. S., King, H. P. F. & McDonnell, K. G. T. & A History of the County of Middlesex. Institute of Historical Research, 1989.
- Jenkins, Simon. Landlords to London: The Story of a Capital and Its Growth. Faber & Faber, 2012.
