= Walter Wilkin =

British barrister and businessman

Sir Walter Wilkin
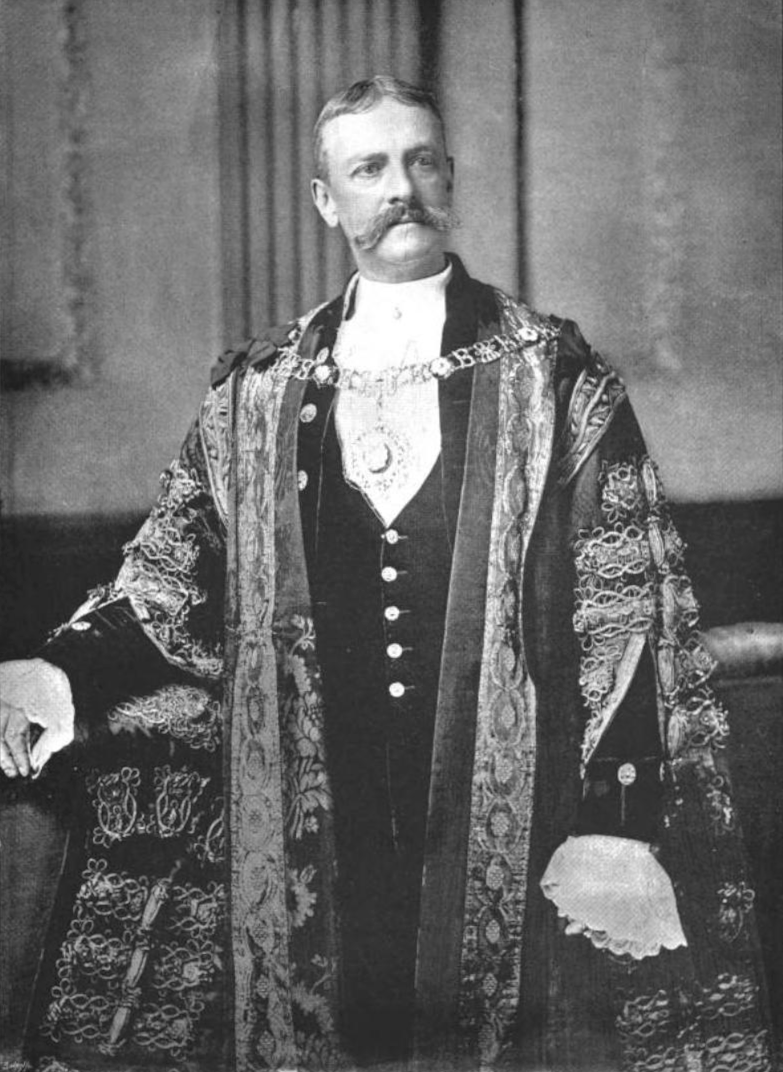
- In The Sketch, 6 November 1895

Lord Mayor of London
- In office 1895–1896

Sheriff of London
- In office 1892–1893

Personal details
- Born: Walter Henry Wilkin; 1 April 1842 City of London, England
- Died: 13 November 1922 (aged 80) Hyde Park Estate, London, England
- Spouse: Margot Dale (m. 1872)
- Children: 3
- Occupation: Barrister, businessman, politician

Sir Walter Henry Wilkin, KCMG, VD, JP, DL (1 April 1842 – 13 November 1922) was a British barrister and businessman who was Lord Mayor of London for 1895–96.

== Life ==
The son of David Wilkin, of Kelvedon Hatch, Essex, and of the City of London, Walker Wilkin born in the city on 1 April 1842, and educated at Dr Pinches' school in Lombard Street, where he was a fellow pupil of Sir Edward Clarke and Sir Henry Irving. He initially joined a firm of underwriters at Lloyd's, but left to be called to the Bar by the Middle Temple in 1875. He was prevented from entering practise by the death of his father and elder brother, which led him to inheriting the family's yeast importing business.

Wilkin was successively Master of the Barbers', Broderers' and Coachmakers' Companies. He became Common Councillor for Lime Street in 1876 and held the post until 1888, when he became an Alderman. He was Sheriff of London in 1892–93, and Lord Mayor of London for 1895–96.

He was a member of the Thames Conservancy Board between 1898 and 1909, as well as Colonel of the 3rd Middlesex Artillery Volunteers.

He was knighted in 1893, and appointed KCMG in 1896.

He died at his home in Gloucester-square, Hyde Park Estate, London on 13 November 1922.

== Family ==
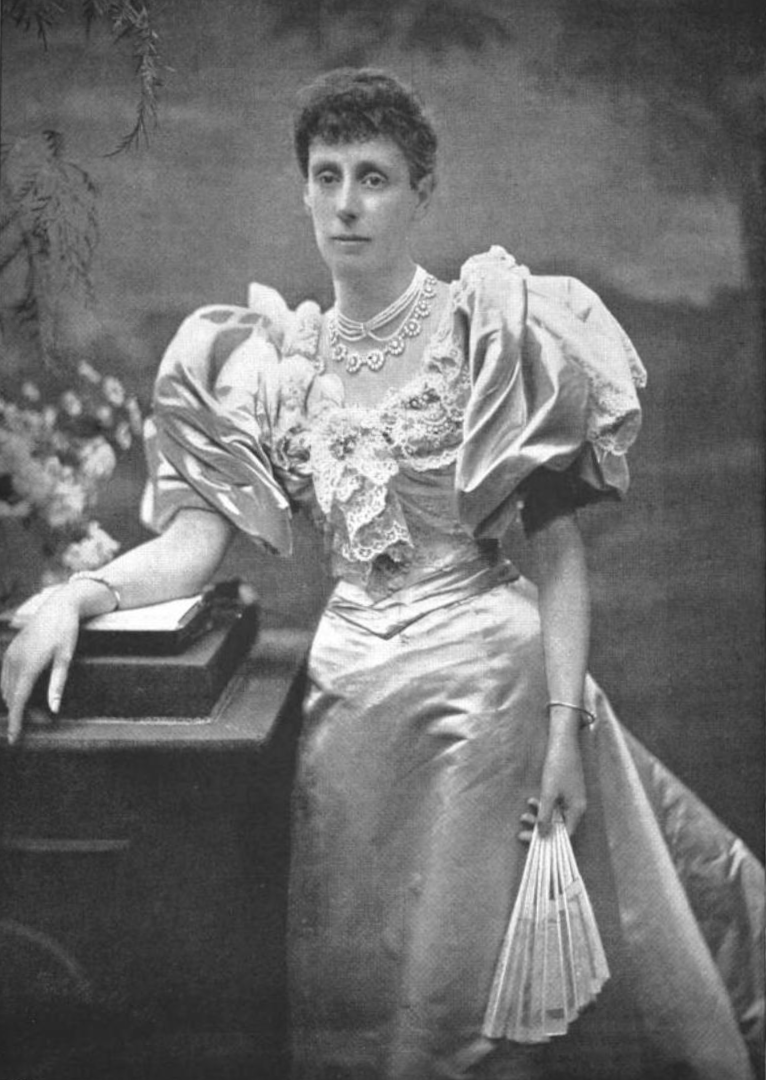
Margot Wilkin

Wilkin married in 1872 Margot Dale, daughter of Henry Ridley Dale. They had two sons and one daughter.
