= Connaught Street =

Street in Central London

Coordinates: 51.51445°N 0.16611°W

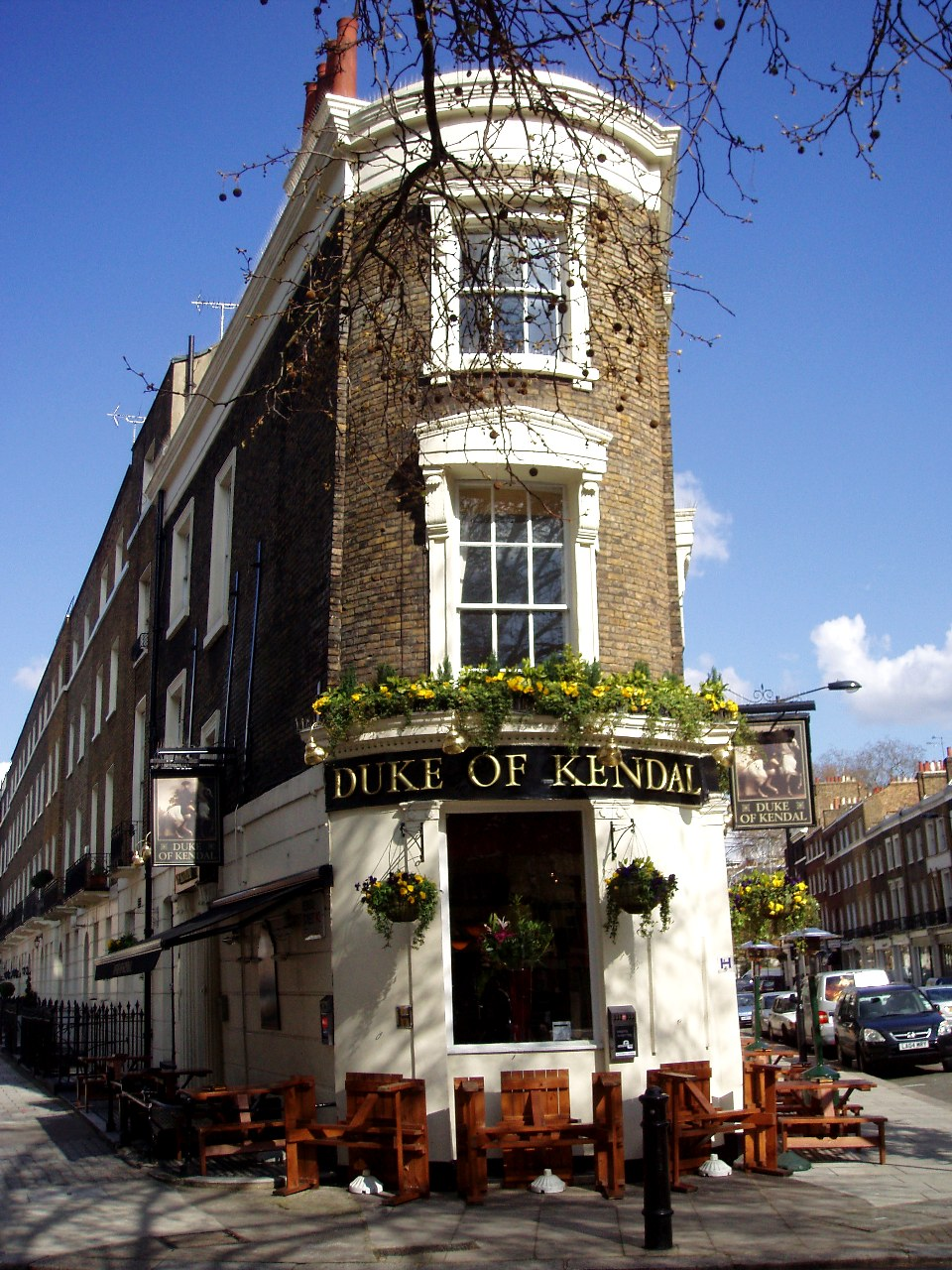
The Duke of Kendal pub.

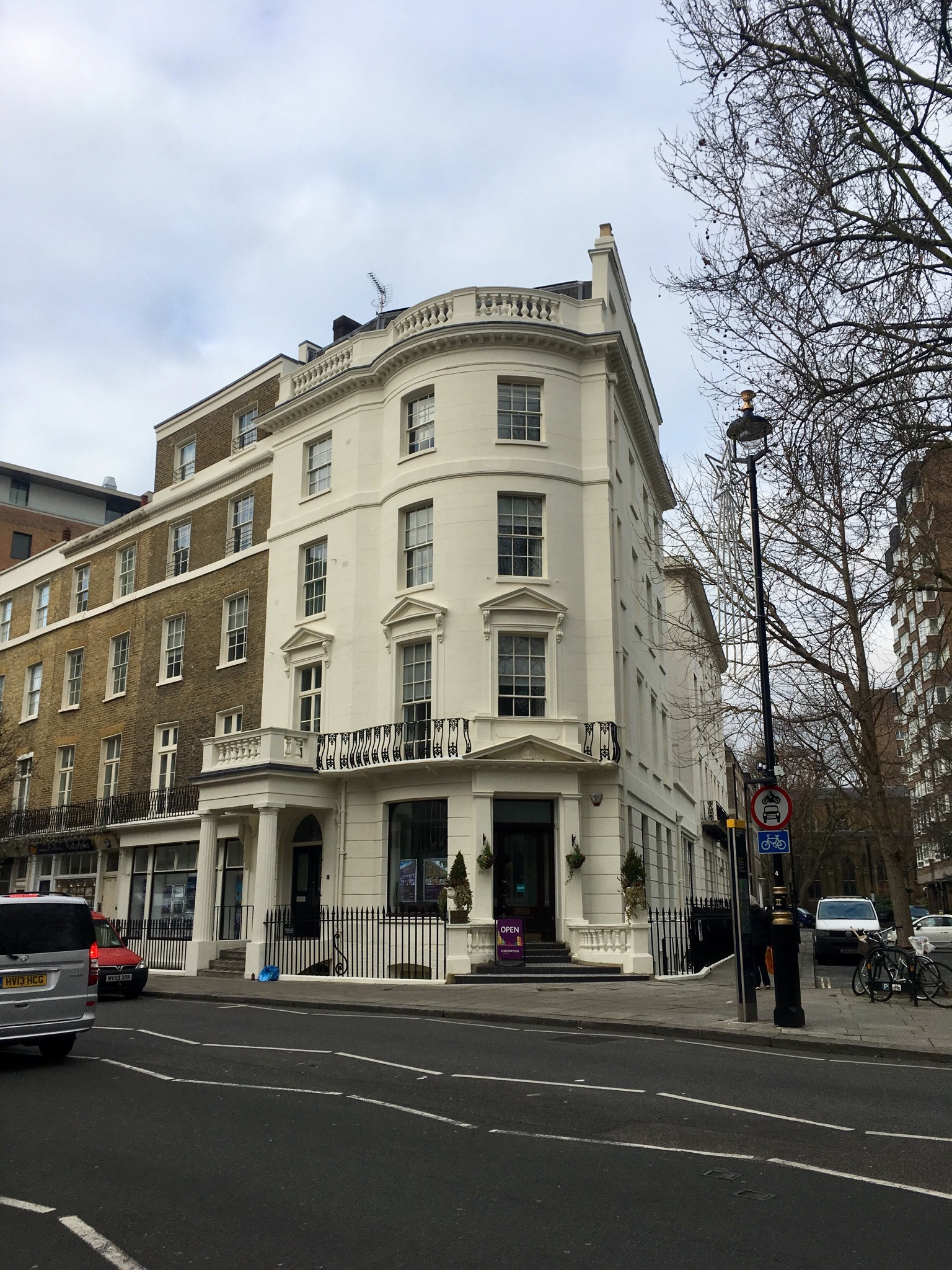
Number 40, Connaught Street.

Connaught Street is a street in Central London. Located in the City of Westminster, it is part of the Tyburnia area of Paddington north of Hyde Park. It runs west to east from Hyde Park Square to the Edgware Road. It continues eastwards becoming Upper Berkeley Street in Marylebone. The street contains a mixture of commercial and residential properties, forming part of Connaught Village. Connaught Square and Albion Street are located on its southern side. The Duke of Kendal public house sits at the junction between Connaught Street and Kendal Street.

It is located close to the historic Tyburn, a site of public executions until the eighteenth century on the outskirts of London. The growing population of the capital led Samuel Pepys Cockerell to lay out an ambitious scheme for redeveloping the area as up-market residential district. Formally part of the Bishop of London's estate, the new plans were amended by George Gutch after Cockerell's death. Work began on Connaught Street and Square in the 1820s, and the first buildings were completed by 1828.

It was originally known as Upper Berkeley Street West. The name was later changed in 1879 to match nearby Connaught Square, which takes its name from the subsidiary Earl of Connaught title of the Duke of Gloucester, the nephew of George III. Much of the street is now Grade II listed featuring the original Regency architecture.

== See also ==
- Connaught Place

== Bibliography ==
- Bebbington, Gillian. London Street Names. Batsford, 1972.
- Cherry, Bridget & Pevsner, Nikolaus. London 3: North West. Yale University Press, 2002.
- Hibbert, Christopher Weinreb, Ben, Keay, John & Keay, Julia. The London Encyclopaedia. Pan Macmillan, 2011.
