= Albion Street =

Albion Street may refer to:

- Albion Street, Leeds, England
- Albion Street, London, England
- Albion Street, Surry Hills, Sydney, Australia
