= Connaught Park =

Connaught Park may refer to:

- Connaught Park Racetrack, a racetrack in Aylmer, Quebec, Canada
- Connaught Park, TMR, a green space in Mount Royal, Quebec Canada
- Connaught Park, Dover, a place of interest in Dover, England

== See also ==
- Connaught Square, in Westminster, London
- Connaught Square (Thunder Bay), in Thunder Bay, Ontario
- Connacht (disambiguation)
