= Connaught Place =

Connaught Place is a place name of various places in the world:

- Connaught Place, New Delhi, officially Rajiv Chowk, an affluent business centre and tourist attraction in New Delhi, Delhi, India
- Connaught Place (Hong Kong) in Central, Hong Kong
- Connaught Place, London in London, England
- Taman Connaught, Kuala Lumpur in Kuala Lumpur, Malaysia

== See also ==
- Connaught (disambiguation)
