= Hyde Park Square =

Garden square in Central London

Coordinates: 51.514°N 0.169°W

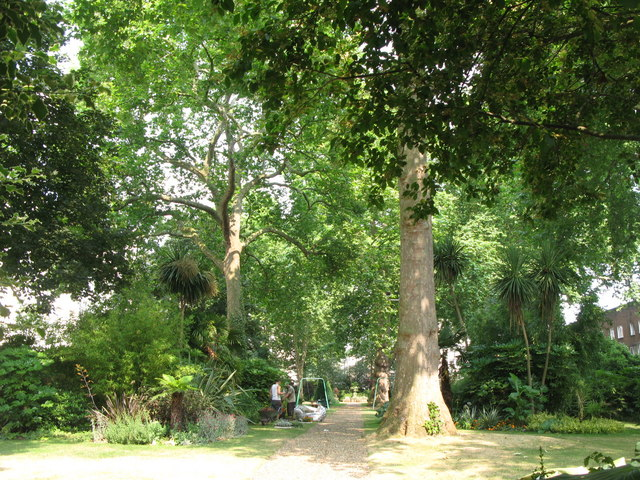
Hyde Park Square

Hyde Park Square is a residential, tree-planted, garden square one block north of Hyde Park fronted by classical buildings, many of which are listed and marks a crossover of Lancaster Gate and Connaught Village neighbourhoods of Bayswater, London. It measures (internally) 200 by 500 feet, of which the bulk is the private communal garden – the rest is street-lit, pavemented streets with low railings in front of the houses. Connaught Street runs eastwards from the square towards the Edgware Road.

== History and layout ==
The square was part of "Tyburnia" planned in 1827 by Samuel Pepys Cockerell for the then semi-rural prime holding of the diocese controlled by the Bishop of London but was laid out to a modified plan by his successor George Gutch.

Aside from an approach street or road at its four corners it marks the end of:

- Clarendon Place, a broad-pavemented 156-metre approach road, and
- Connaught Street, which features high street services, coffee shops and restaurants, including Connaught Village.

Numbering runs in one set for each side, anticlockwise, from south-east:

- 1, 2
- 10 (large), 13 to 20A, 21 (co-fronts and shared building with 43 & 43A Gloucester Square);
- 22 to 24
- 30 to 37 (37 being a shared building with 8 Clarendon Place), 38 to 47 (slightly below average in their frontage width).

The square measures, internally, 200 feet (61 m) by 500 feet (150 m), of which the bulk is the private communal garden – the rest is street-lit, pavemented streets with low railings in front of the houses.

== Buildings ==
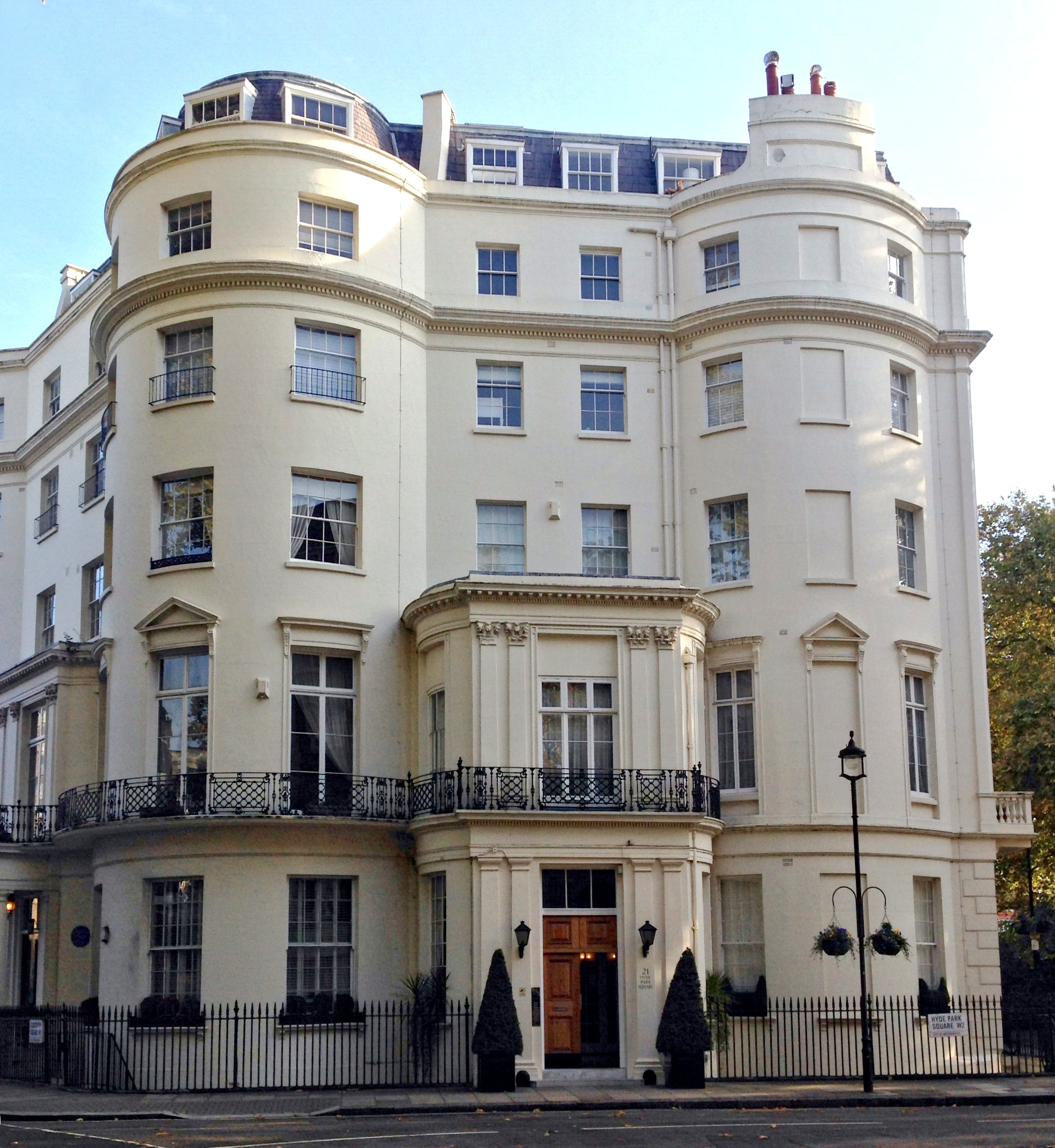
21 Hyde Park Square

№s 11–20A and 21 on the north side are grade II listed buildings, thus statutorily protected. №s 30–37 (the west of the south side) is too, likewise, built around 1830–40, probably by George Ledwell Taylor.

== Residents ==
- № 21 was the long-term home of a branch of the Bonham Carter family, including Sir Maurice Bonham-Carter (1880 - 1960) and his wife Violet Bonham Carter, later Baroness Asquith of Yarnbury (1887 - 1969)
- № 13 was the family home of architect Peter Dollar (died 1943).
- № 8 was that of merchant, shipowner John Boulcott (died 1855).
