= Wertheimer portraits =

Painting series by John Singer Sargent

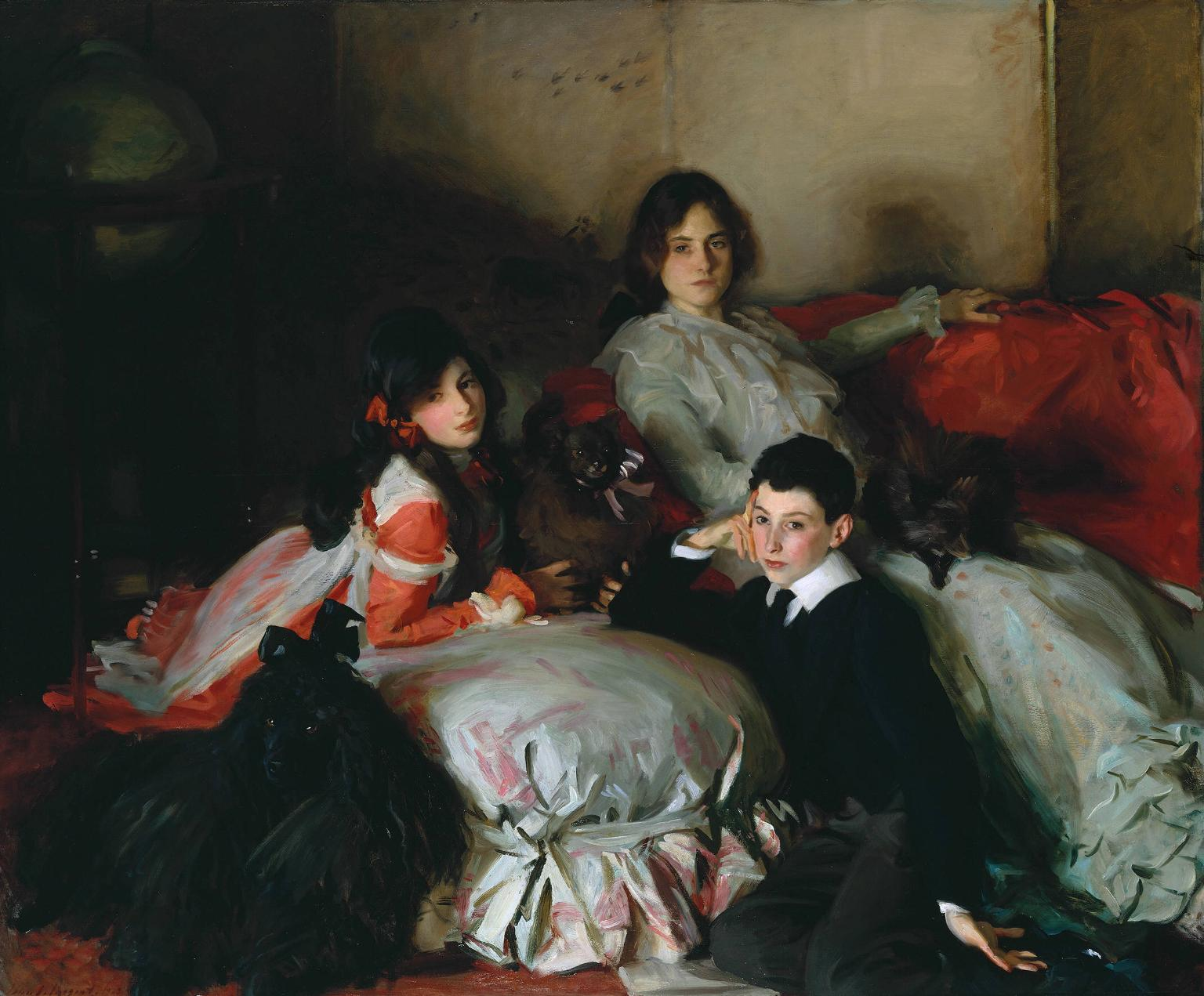
- Artist: John Singer Sargent
- Year: 1902
- Medium: Oil on canvas
- Dimensions: 161.3 cm × 193.7 cm (63.5 in × 76.3 in)
- Location: Tate Britain, London

The Wertheimer portraits are a series of twelve portrait paintings made by John Singer Sargent (1856–1925) of and for the British art dealer Asher Wertheimer (1843–1918) and his family. The series amounts to Sargent's largest private commission.

== Background ==
Asher Wertheimer was born in London. His father, Samson, was born in Germany, and was related to court Jews such as Samson Wertheimer (1658–1724) and members of the Gomperz and the Oppenheimer families. Samson Wertheimer became a leading art dealer in London, and Asher continued the business from premises on Bond Street after his father's death.

Asher Wertheimer married in 1873. His wife Flora (1846–1922) was the daughter of another London art dealer. Of their twelve children, four sons and eight daughters, two daughters died in infancy. The other ten children survived into adulthood, but the two eldest sons both died before their 30th birthdays:

1. a daughter, Sarah (1872–1873), who died in infancy
2. eldest son Edward (1873–1902), musician, intended to take over the business, died after eating a bad oyster on his honeymoon
3. eldest surviving daughter Helena (Ena) (1874–1935), married Robert Moritz Mathias (1874–1961) in 1905
4. second son Alfred (1876–1902), studied to be a chemist, died in the Boer War
5. second surviving daughter Elizabeth (Betty) (1877–1953), married Euston Salaman (1871–1916) and then Major Dr Arthur Ricketts
6. third surviving daughter Hylda (1878–1938), married Henry Wilson-Young (d. 1940)
7. fourth surviving daughter Essie (1880–1932?), married Eustace Wilding (1873–1939) in 1905
8. third son Conway (1881–1953), later Conway Joseph Conway, barrister
9. a daughter, Lizzie (1884–1886), who died in infancy
10. fifth surviving daughter Almina (1886–1928), married Antonio Pandelli Fachiri (1886–1928/9) in 1915
11. fourth son Ferdinand (Bob) (1888–1950), later Bob Conway, artist and writer
12. sixth surviving daughter Ruby (1889–1941), died at the San Severino Marche internment camp in Italy

The two surviving sons, Conway and Ferdinand, later changed their surname to "Joseph Conway", perhaps to avoid anti-German sentiment during the First World War. Two daughters, Ena and Betty, both trained at the Slade School of Fine Art.

== Portraits ==
The family became close friends of the artist John Singer Sargent. He often dined at their home at 8 Connaught Place, where the dining room – sometimes described as "Sargent's mess" – was decorated with eight of the family portraits. Mr and Mrs Wertheimer commissioned Singer Sargent to paint two portraits to celebrate their 25th wedding anniversary in 1898, and ten more commissions followed in the next decade:

- a portrait of Asher Wertheimer (1898)
- a portrait of Flora Wertheimer (1898) in a white dress
- a portrait of the eldest two surviving daughters, Helena (Ena) with her sister Elizabeth (Betty) (1901) – aged about 27 and 24 respectively
- a portrait of the third surviving daughter Hylda (1901) – aged about 23
- a portrait of the second son Alfred (1901?), when he was studying to be a chemist aged about 25, shortly before his death in the Boer War
- a portrait of the elder son Edward (1902), aged about 29, sketch painted in Paris, shortly before his early death that year, before a completed portrait was finished
- a portrait of the fourth surviving daughter Essie with her two youngest siblings, fourth son Ferdinand and sixth surviving daughter Ruby (1902), aged about 22, 14 and 13 respectively
- a second portrait of Flora Wertheimer (1904), in a black dress
- a portrait of the third surviving daughter Hylda, third son Conway, and fifth surviving daughter Almina (1905), aged about 27, 24, and 19 respectively
- a second portrait of Ena, titled A Vele Gonfie (1905), was a wedding gift, and later sold to raise money for her art gallery; it was donated to the Tate in 1996
- a portrait of the second surviving daughter Betty (1908), aged about 31
- a portrait of the fifth surviving daughter Almina, in Persian costume, with a lute (1908), aged about 22

Sargent's portrait of Asher Wertheimer was a success when exhibited at the Royal Academy of Arts, later described by Robbie Ross in The Art Journal in 1911 as "the only modern picture which challenges the Doria Velázquez at Rome". However, the accompanying portrait of Flora Wertheimer with pearls and a white dress was less successful. Sargent was asked to paint a second version of Flora, in which she is seated and dressed in black, which was better received.

Wertheimer died in 1918, and left nine of the family portraits to the British nation. In accordance with his will, they were delivered to the National Gallery in 1922, after his wife's death, where they were displayed together in their own room. They were soon transferred to the new Tate Gallery of British Art. (A tenth, the A Vele Gonfie portrait of Ena, was bequeathed to the Tate Gallery in 1996.) There were some negative reactions to the donation, with the historian Sir Charles Oman commenting that "these clever, but extremely repulsive, pictures should be placed in a special chamber of horrors", and later commentators have seen some anti-Semitic elements in the portrayal of the family, although they themselves were very happy with them.

The other two family portraits are held in US galleries. The first portrait of Flora Wertheimer in a white dress was inherited by her daughter Hylda and later came into the collection of the New Orleans Museum of Art. A 1908 portrait of Betty is held by the Smithsonian American Art Museum, in Washington, DC. All twelve portraits were reunited for an exhibition at the Jewish Museum in New York in 1999–2000.

The relationship between Sargent and the Wertheimer family is the subject of a book by American biographer Jean Strouse, Family Romance: John Singer Sargent and the Wertheimers, published in 2024 by Farrar, Straus and Giroux.

== Gallery ==
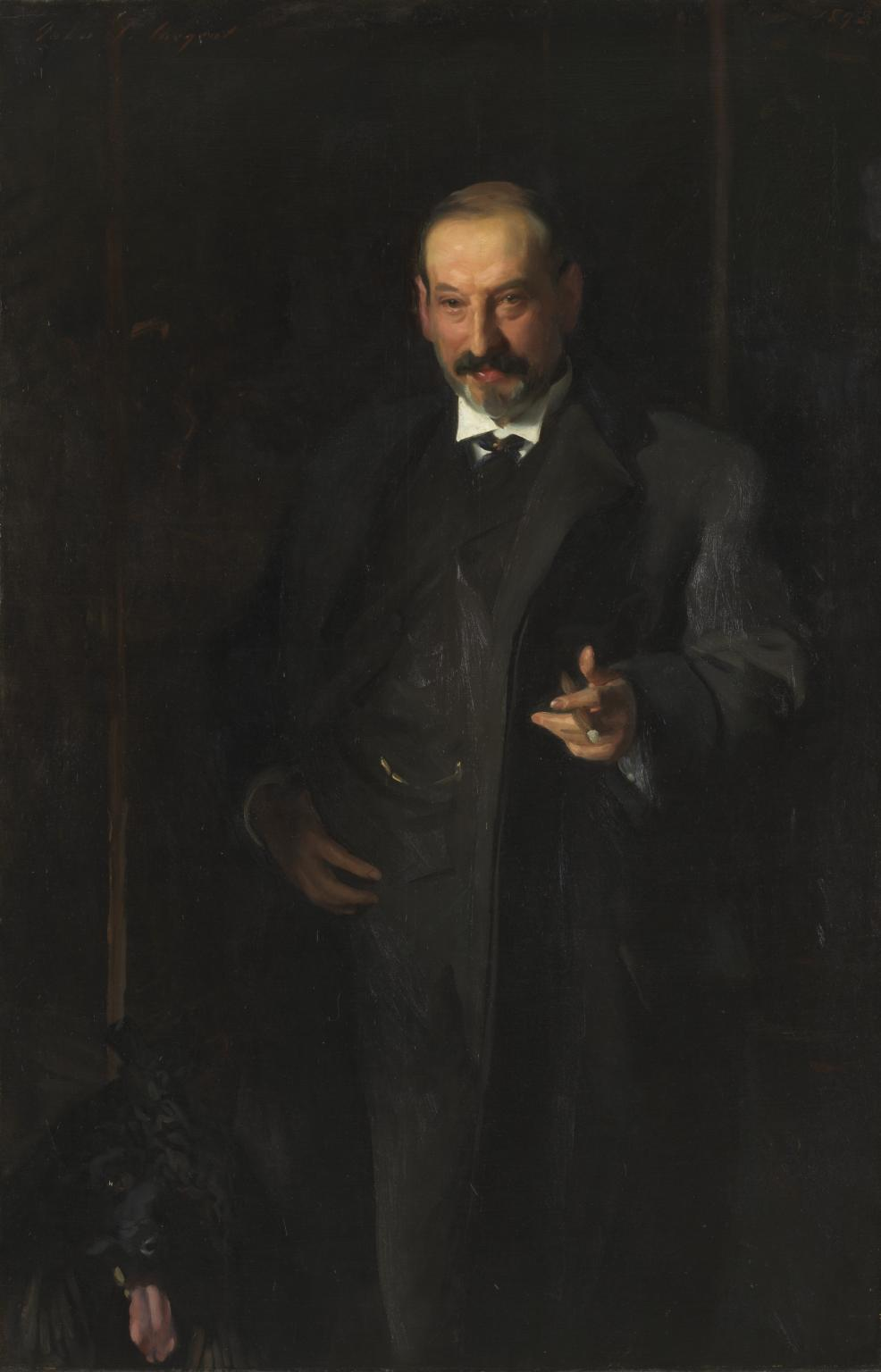
Asher Wertheimer, 1898, Tate Britain

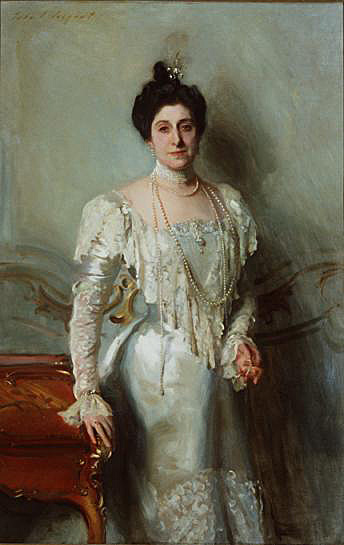
Mrs Wertheimer, 1898, New Orleans Museum of Art

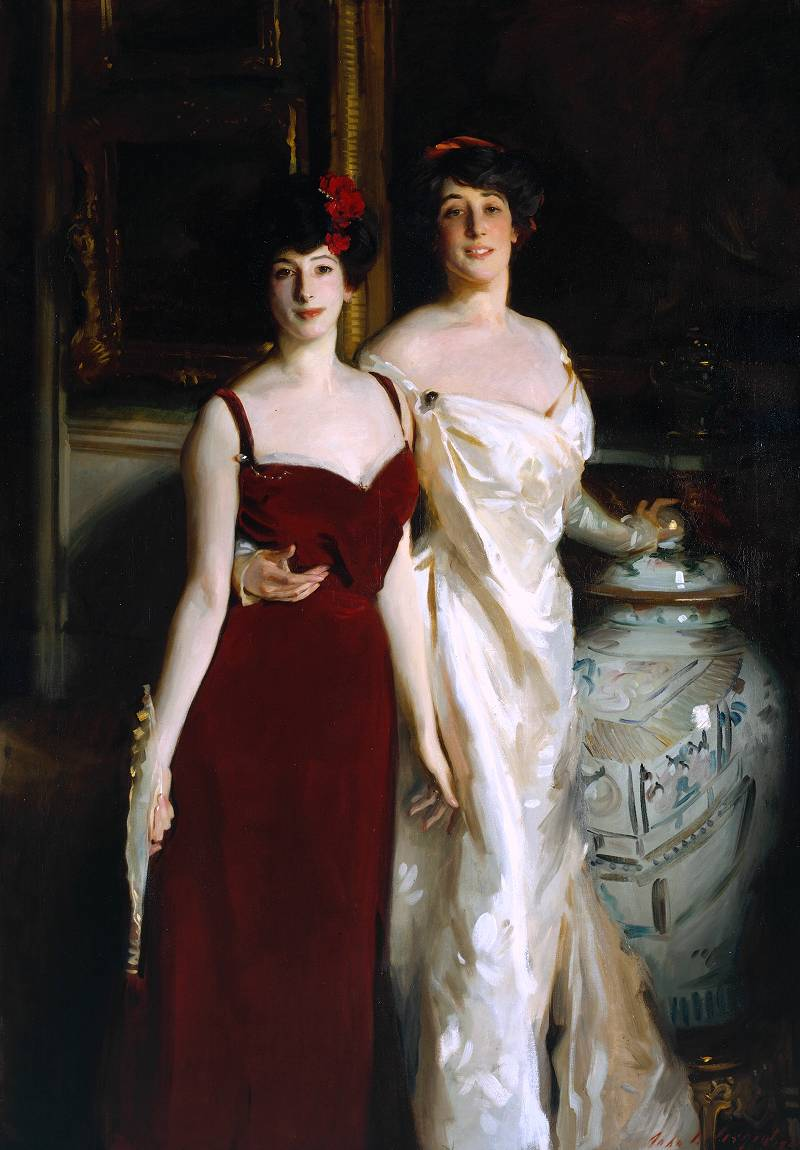
Ena and Betty Wertheimer, 1901, Tate Britain

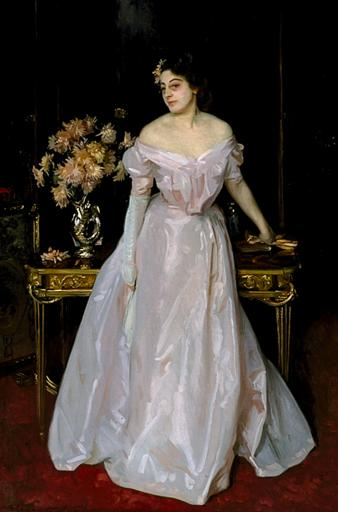
Hylda Wertheimer, 1901, Tate Britain

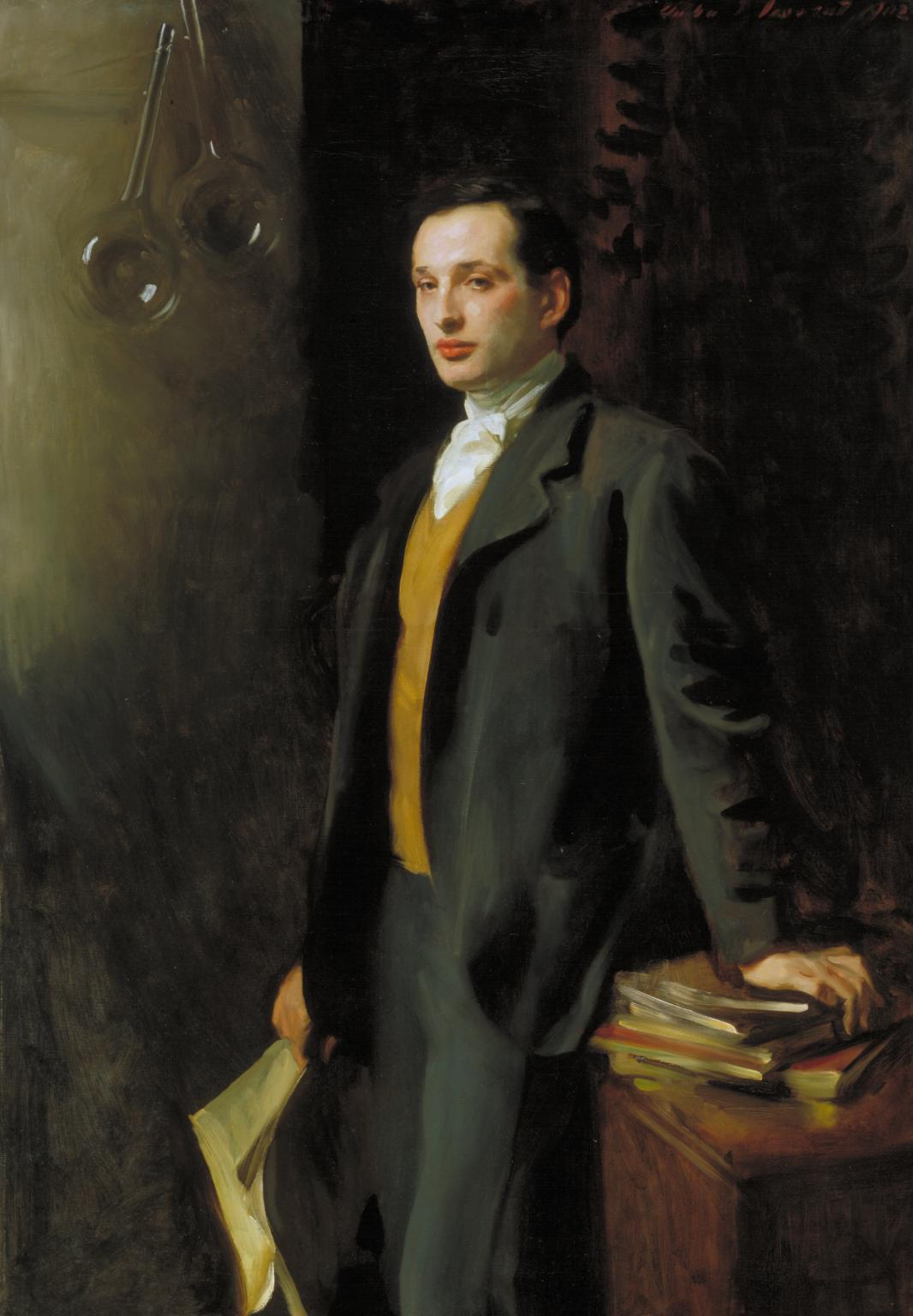
Alfred Wertheimer, 1901, Tate Britain

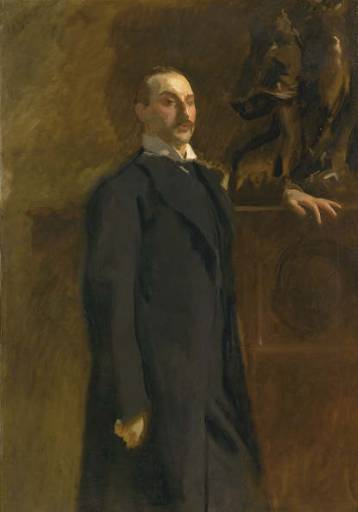
Unfinished portrait of Edward Wertheimer, 1902, Tate Britain

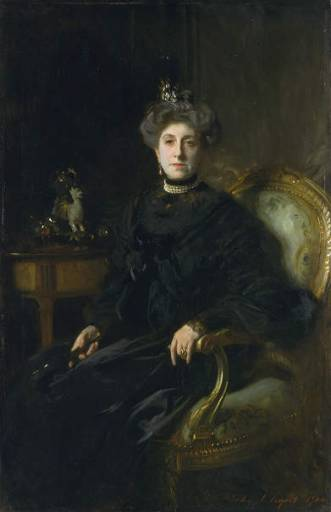
Mme Asher Wertheimer, 1904, Tate Britain

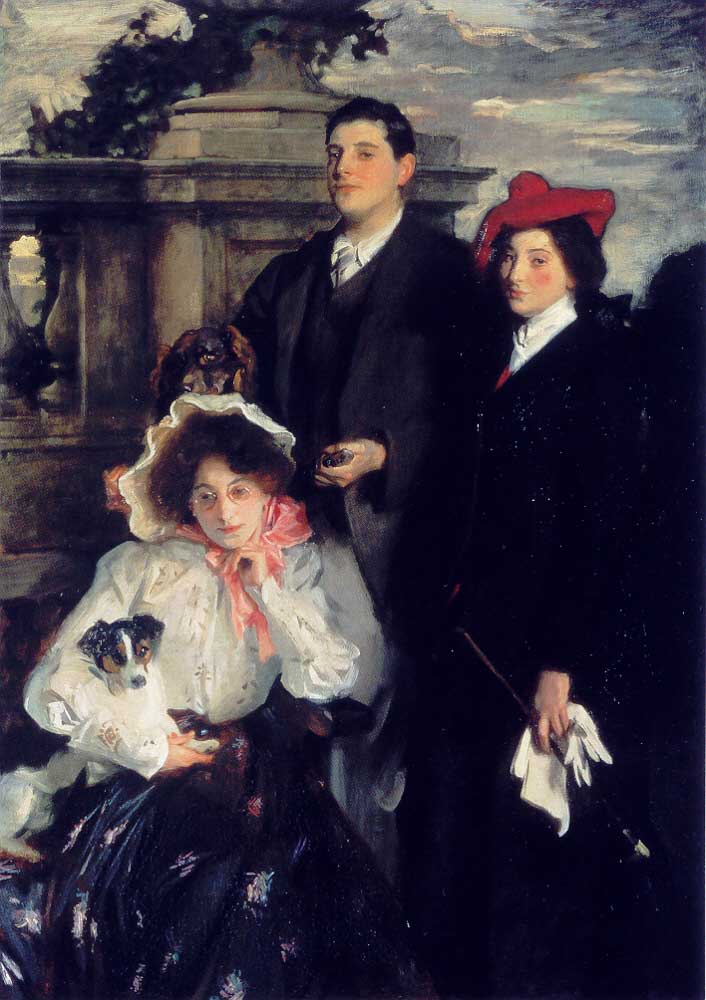
Conway, Almina and Hylda Wertheimer, 1905, Tate Britain

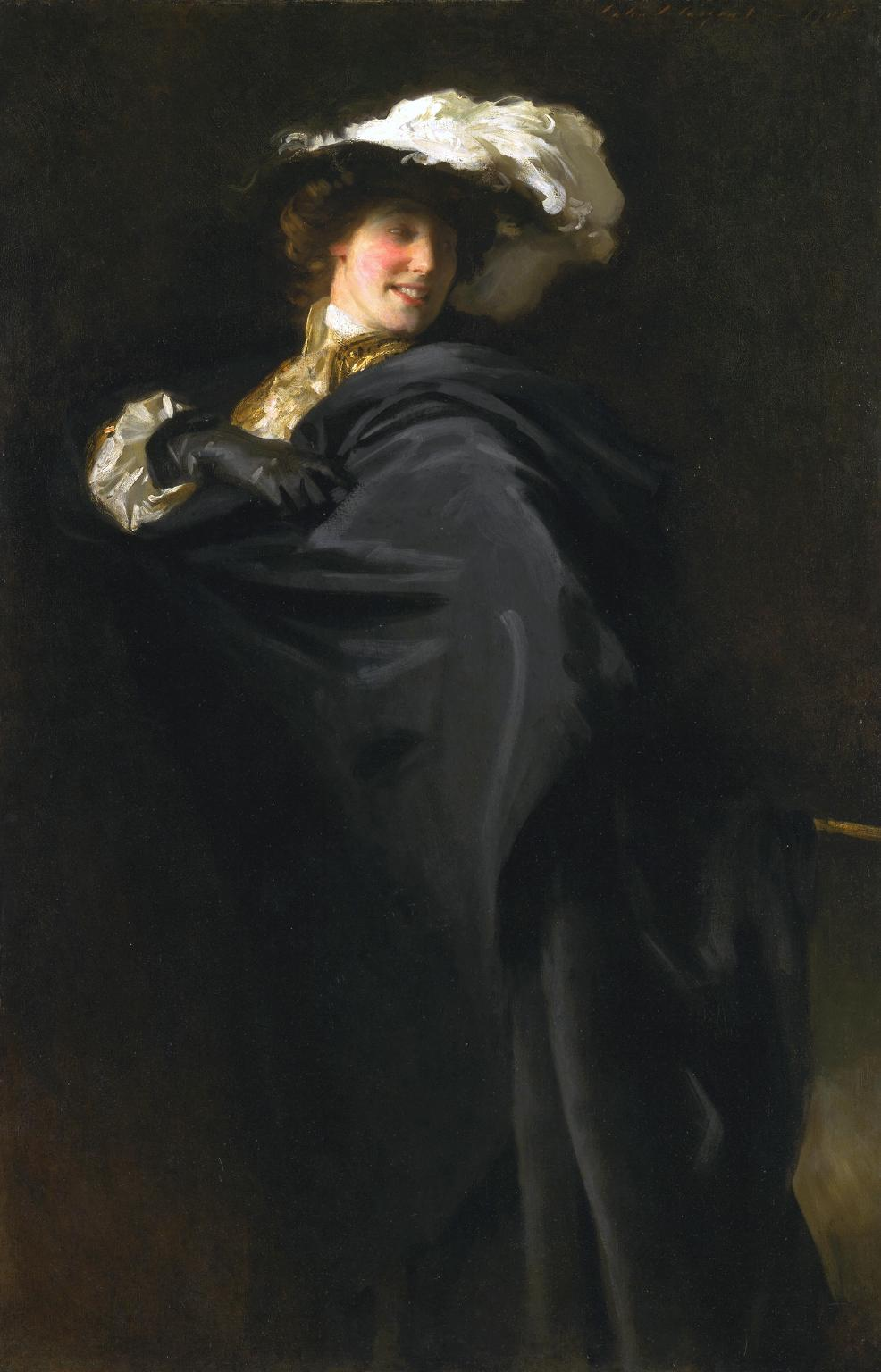
Ena Wertheimer, "a vele gonfie", 1905, Tate Britain

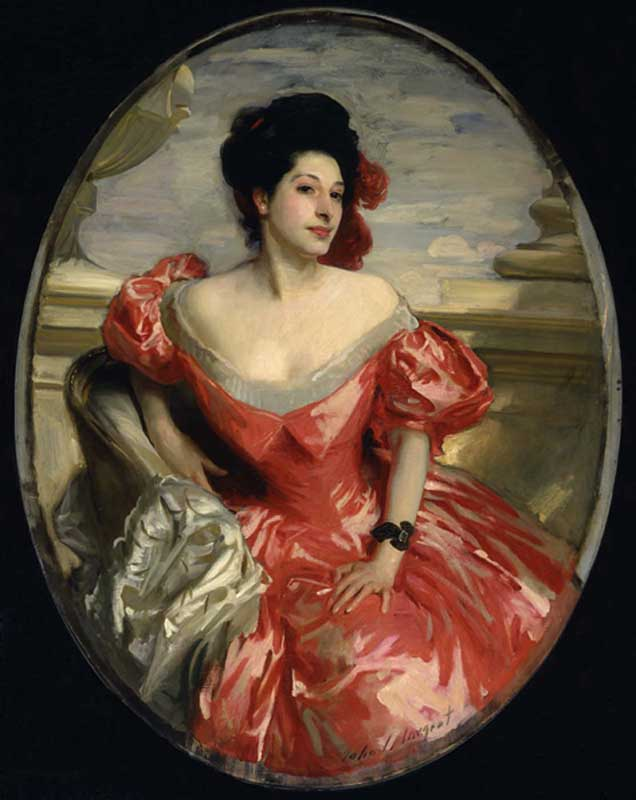
Betty Wertheimer, 1908, Smithsonian American Art Museum

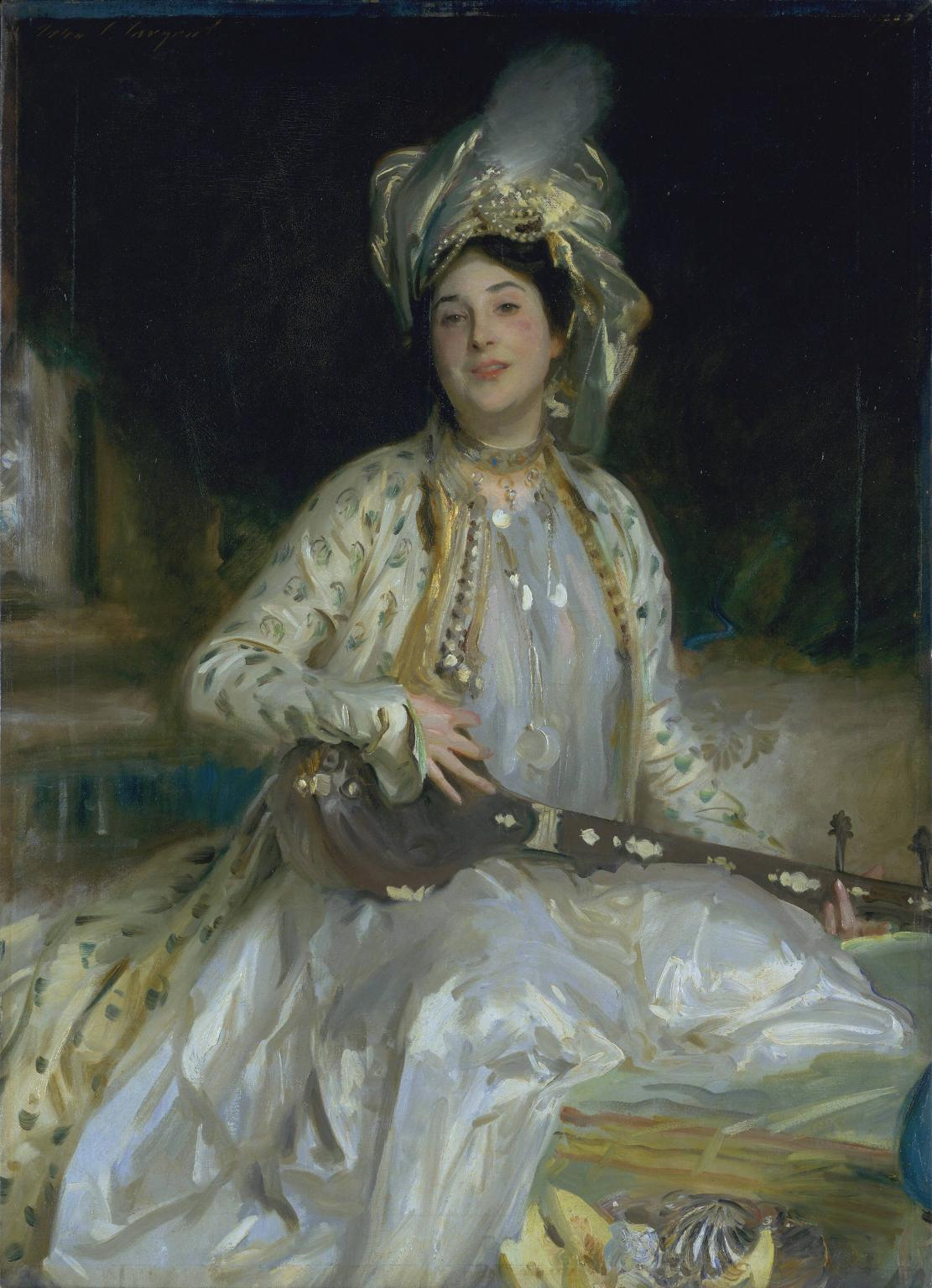
Almina Wertheimer, 1908, Tate Britain

== See also ==
- List of works by John Singer Sargent
