= Sheriff of the City of London =

Office in the City of London, England

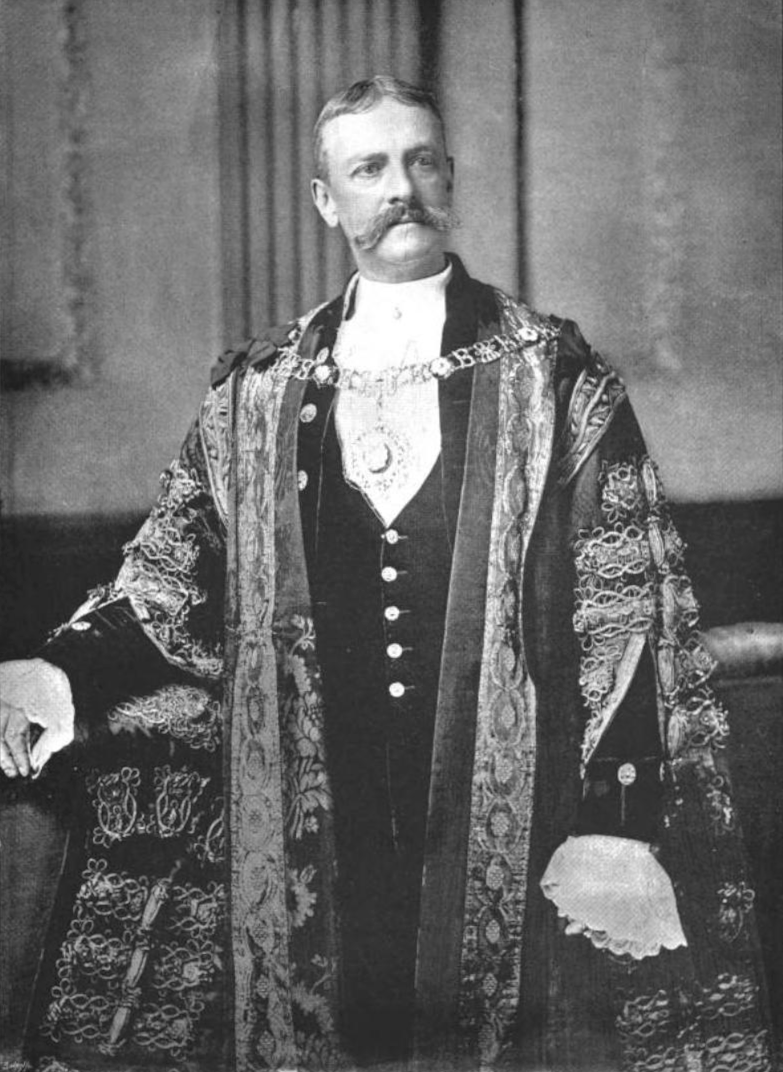
Sir Walter Wilkin, Sheriff of London for 1892/93

The sheriffs of the City of London are ceremonial officers of the City of London. Two sheriffs are elected annually by the members of the City's livery companies. Today's sheriffs have only ceremonial duties, but the historical officeholders held important judicial responsibilities. They have attended the justices at the Central Criminal Court, Old Bailey, since its original role as the court for the City of London and Middlesex.

The Sheriffs reside at the Old Bailey during their year of service, so that one of them can always be attendant on the judges. In Court No. 1 the bench's principal chairs are reserved for their and the Lord Mayor's use, with the Sword of the City hanging behind the bench. It is an invariable custom that the Lord Mayor of London must previously have served as Sheriff. To become a Sheriff, one must be lawfully entitled to armorial bearings by proving their right by descent, whilst those not armigerous by birth can apply for a grant from the College of Arms to run for office.

By "custom of immemorial usage in the City", the City liverymen elect two Sheriffs at Midsummer Common Hall by acclamation, unless a ballot is demanded from the floor, taking place within fourteen days. The returning officers at Common Hall in Guildhall are the Recorder of London (the Central Criminal Court senior circuit judge) and the outgoing Sheriffs.

As elected officers from the 7th century (excepting 1067 to 1132), the Sheriffs' jurisdiction covers the City's Square Mile, as well as Middlesex from the Middle Ages until the 1890s. The High Sheriff of Greater London, created in 1965, now covers the areas of London surrounding the City.

== History of the office ==
The title of sheriff, or shire reeve, evolved during the Anglo-Saxon period of English history. The reeve was the representative of the king in a city, town or shire, responsible for collecting taxes and enforcing the law. By the time of the Norman Conquest in 1066, the City of London had sheriffs, usually two at a time. The sheriffs were the most important city officials and collected London's annual taxes on behalf of the royal exchequer; they also had judicial duties in the City's law courts.

Until c. 1130, the sheriffs were directly appointed by the king. London gained a degree of self-government by a royal charter granted by Henry I, including the right to choose its own sheriff, a right which was affirmed in an 1141 charter by King Stephen. By Henry's charter, the sheriffs of London also gained jurisdiction over the neighbouring county of Middlesex, paying £300 per annum to the Crown for the privilege. This did not make the county a dependency of the City but rather from that time the City of London and Middlesex were viewed as a single administrative area.

In 1189, an annually elected Mayor was introduced as chief magistrate for the City of London (along the lines of some European cities at the time such as Rouen and Liège); this change was reaffirmed by a charter granted by King John in 1215. As such, the sheriffs were relegated to a less senior role in the running of the City, and became subordinate to the Mayor. The Mayor (later Lord Mayor of London) generally served as Sheriff before being elected Mayor, and in 1385 the Common Council of London stipulated that every future Lord Mayor should "have previously been Sheriff so that he may be tried as to his governance and bounty before he attains to the Estate of Mayoralty"; this tradition continues to this day.

In 1889 the jurisdiction of the Sheriffs was restricted to the City. The Local Government Act 1888 created a new office of High Sheriff of Middlesex appointed in the same manner as other English and Welsh counties. At the same time, the most populous parts of Middlesex were included in the new County of London, which had its own High Sheriff.

== See also ==
- List of Lord Mayors of London
