= Jean Strouse =

American writer (born 1945)

Jean Strouse (born 1945) is an American biographer, cultural administrator, and critic. She is best known for her biographies of diarist Alice James and financier J. Pierpont Morgan, and her book Family Romance: John Singer Sargent and the Wertheimers.

== Life ==
Strouse graduated from Radcliffe College in 1968. She was an editorial assistant at The New York Review of Books from 1967 to 1969. She was a book critic at Newsweek magazine from 1979 to 1983 and won a MacArthur Fellowship in 2001. She has also held fellowships from the John Simon Guggenheim Memorial Foundation, the National Endowment for the Humanities, and the National Endowment for the Arts. She has contributed reviews and essays on literary and other topics to The New York Review of Books, The New York Times Book Review, The New Yorker, and Vogue. From 2003 to 2017, Strouse was the Sue Ann and John Weinberg Director of the Dorothy and Lewis B. Cullman Center for Scholars and Writers at the New York Public Library.

External videos
- Presentation by Strouse on Morgan, April 15, 1999, C-SPAN
- Booknotes interview with Strouse on Morgan: American Financier, May 23, 1999, C-SPAN
- Washington Journal interview with Strouse on Morgan, September 8, 2001, C-SPAN

Strouse's 1980 book Alice James: A Biography won a Bancroft Prize. Her next book, Morgan: American Financier (1999), earned praise for its realistic portrayal of Morgan's personality and its explanations of complex financial topics. Strouse has also edited two books by Henry James: the Library of America's edition of James's 1864–74 short stories, and the NYRB edition of James's last completed novel, The Outcry. Her 2024 book Family Romance: John Singer Sargent and the Wertheimers deals with the relationship of John Singer Sargent and the family of Asher Wertheimer, a London art dealer who commissioned Sargent to paint 12 portraits of his family.
