= Tyburnia =

Area in Central London

Coordinates: 51.5149°N 0.1701°W

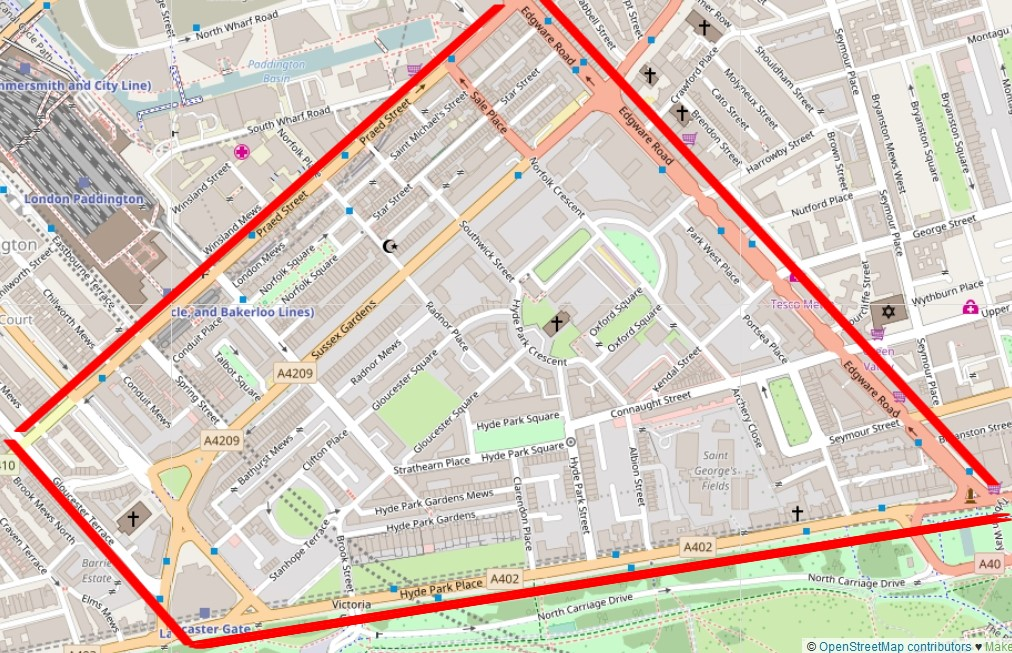
Tyburnia on a modern street map. Northern and western edges approximate. Hyde Park lies to the south.

Tyburnia is an area in Paddington, London, originally developed following an 1824 masterplan drawn up by Samuel Pepys Cockerell (1753–1827) to redevelop the historic lands of the Bishop of London, known as the Tyburn Estate, into a residential area to rival Belgravia. Tyburnia was the first part of Paddington to be developed.

== Area ==
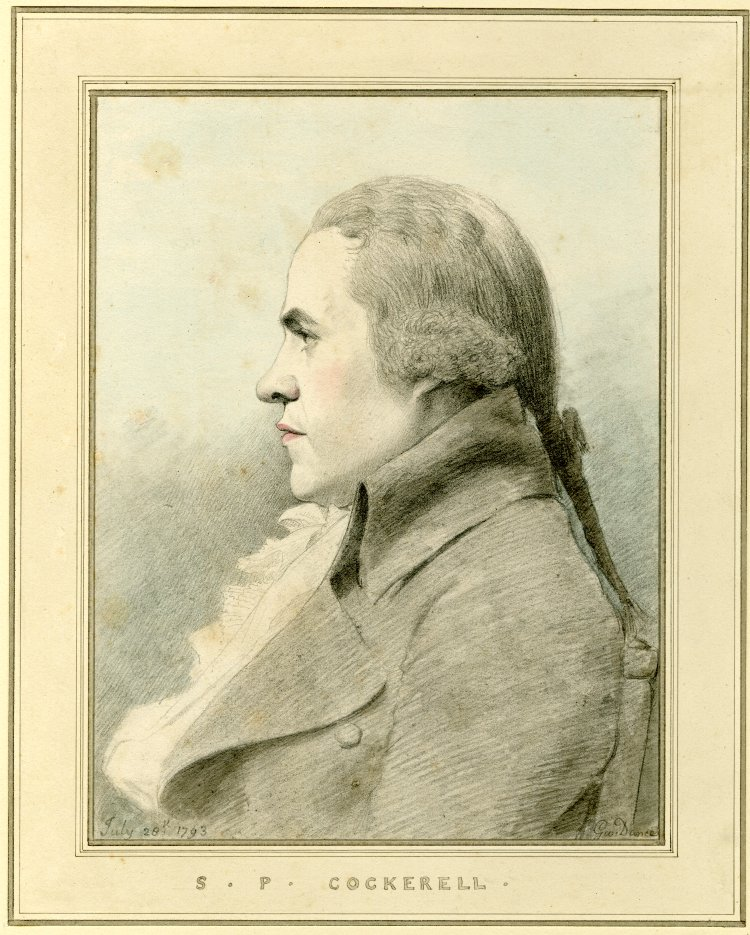
Samuel Pepys Cockerell laid out most of the area in the Regency era.

The area called Tyburnia has varied over time and it was never finished according to the original plan but it is certainly bounded by Edgware Road in the east and Bayswater Road and Hyde Park Place in the south. The northern boundary is generally regarded as Craven Road and Praed Street, while the western boundary is generally regarded as Gloucester Terrace. Sussex Gardens provides the main axis of the area, off which other streets run. It features several garden squares including Norfolk Square, Talbot Square, Hyde Park Square and Sussex Square. Streets include Albion Street, Stanhope Terrace, Connaught Street and Connaught Place. St George's Fields is also located in the area.

== History ==
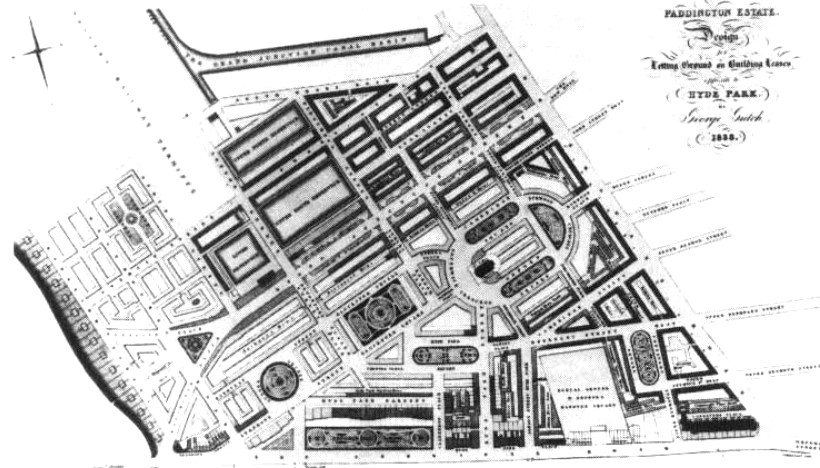
George Gutch's 1838 Final Plan for Tyburnia.

The district formed the centrepiece of an 1824 masterplan by Samuel Pepys Cockerell to redevelop the historic lands of the Bishop of London, known as the Tyburn Estate, into a residential area to rival Belgravia. It was the first part of Paddington to be developed.

The area was laid out in the mid-1800s when grand squares and cream-stuccoed terraces started to fill the acres between Paddington station and Hyde Park; however, the plans were never realised in full. The author William Makepeace Thackeray, who lived in Albion Street, described the district as "the elegant, the prosperous, the polite Tyburnia, the most respectable district of the habitable globe."
