= Connaught Hall =

Connaught Hall may refer to one of two university halls of residence:

- Connaught Hall, London — a University of London intercollegiate hall of residence in Tavistock Square, London WC1
- Connaught Hall, Southampton — owned by University of Southampton
