= Connaught, Ontario =

Connaught, Ontario may refer to:

- Connaught, a community in Admaston/Bromley, an incorporated township in Renfrew County, Ontario, Canada
- Connaught, a community in North Dundas, a township in the United Counties of Stormont, Dundas and Glengarry in Ontario, Canada
- Connaught, one of the Neighbourhoods in Timmins, Ontario, Canada
