= George Ledwell Taylor =

English architect (1788–1873)

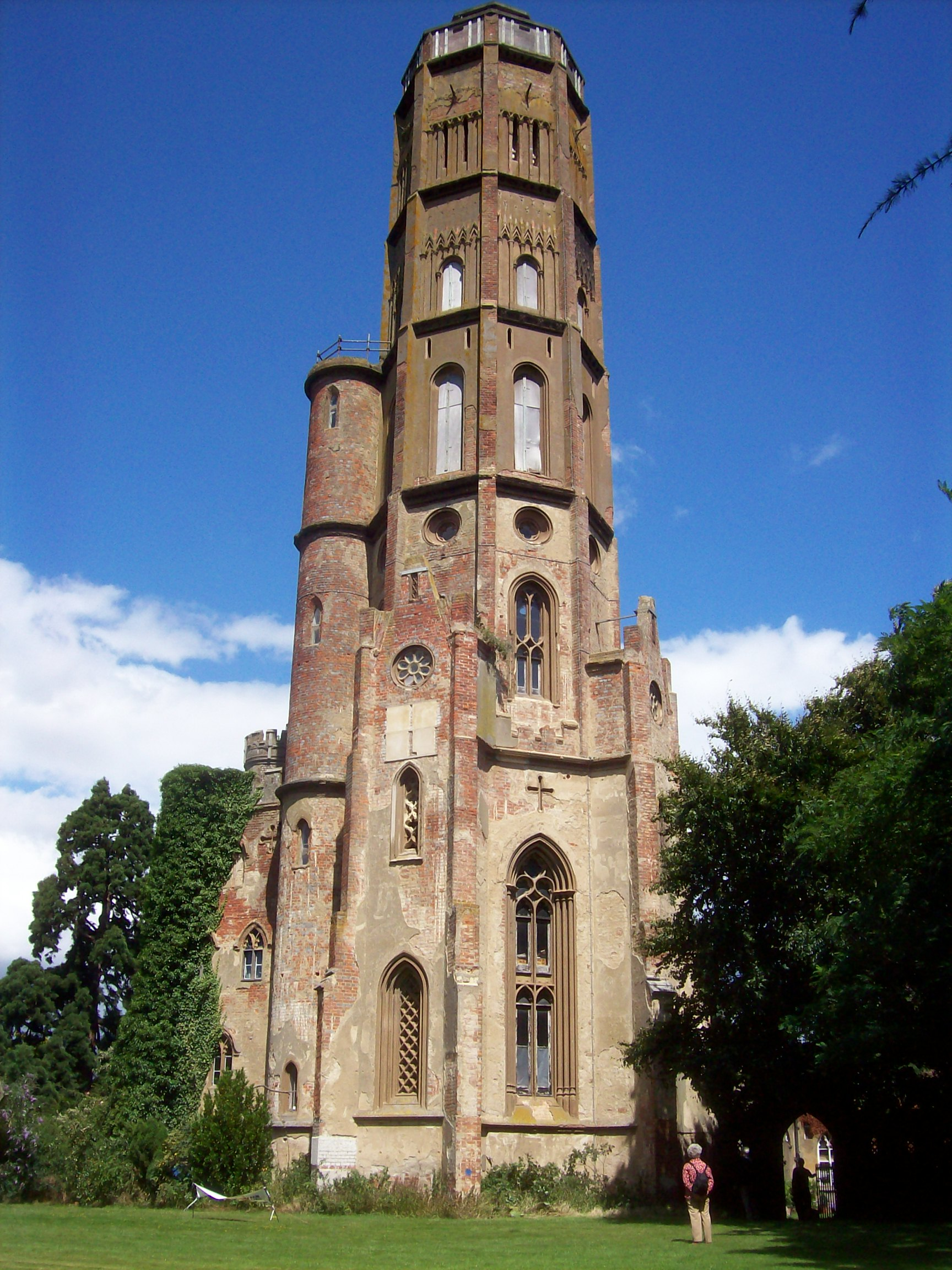
Hadlow Castle

George Ledwell Taylor (31 March 1788 – 1 May 1873) was an English architect and archaeologist. Between 1824 and 1837 he was surveyor of buildings to the naval department and superintended important works in the dockyards at Chatham, Woolwich, and Sheerness. He developed a site on the east side of Trafalgar Square, and later claimed that the square had been named at his suggestion. In 1843–8 he laid out parts of the Bishop of London's estate, including Westbourne Terrace and Chester Place.

== Life ==
Taylor was born on 31 March 1788 and educated at Rawes's academy, Bromley. He became a pupil of the architect James Burton and, on Burton's retirement, of Joseph Parkinson, who was then engaged in laying out the Portman estate. While articled to Parkinson, Taylor superintended the building of Montagu and Bryanston Squares (1811), and the neighbouring streets.

In 1816, he went on two walking tours of England with his fellow pupil Edward Cresy. In 1817 he and Cresy set off on a grand tour, visiting France, Switzerland, and Italy, before spending a summer in Greece. At Pisa, they made a detailed survey of the Campo Santo and the Leaning Tower; later publishing the drawings in a volume called Architecture of the Middle Ages in Italy (1829). On their return to England, Taylor and Cresy set up an office in Furnival's Inn. Taylor lived at 52 Bedford Square and, afterwards in Spring Gardens, later moving to a villa at Lee Terrace, Blackheath, one of a group of four he had designed himself.

In 1818 Taylor spent a summer in Greece with two friends at Livadeia. On June 3, they decided to go horseback riding to the nearby village of Chaeronea using Pausanias' Description of Greece as a guidebook. Two hours away from the village, Taylor's horse momentarily stumbled on a piece of marble jutting from the ground. Looking back at the rock, he was struck by its appearance of being sculpted and called for their party to stop. They dismounted and dug at it with their riding whips, ascertaining that it was indeed sculpture. They enlisted the help of some nearby farmers until they finally uncovered the massive head of a stone lion, which they recognized as the Lion of Chaeronea mentioned by Pausanias, dedicated to the Second Band of Thebes. Parts of the statue had broken off, and a good deal of it still remained buried. They immediately reported their discovery when they returned to Athens.

On 8 June 1820, he married Bella Neufville, by whom he had eleven children.

== Naval Department ==
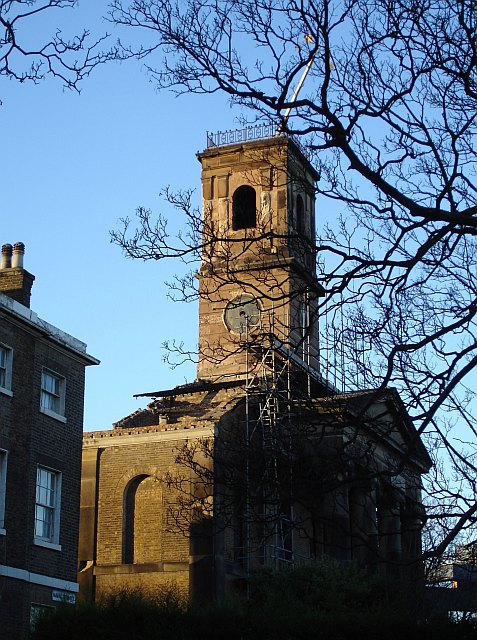
Dockyard Church, Sheerness - awaiting restoration.

In 1824 he was appointed surveyor of buildings to the naval department. In this capacity he superintended important works in the dockyards at Chatham, Woolwich, and Sheerness and alterations to the Clarence victualling yard at Gosport. His work at Sheerness included the neoclassical Royal Dockyard Church of 1828. The works he carried out at Chatham included the construction of the Melville Hospital (1827) and the underpinning with concrete of the Long Storehouse, which had been destabilised by the decay of the timbers which served as its foundations. He presented a paper on the subject of this “experimental system of undersetting” at a meeting of the Institute of British Architects in 1836. At Woolwich, he built the river wall (1831).

== Private practice ==
In 1837 a programme of budget cuts at the Admiralty led to Taylor's dismissal. He took up general practice, and qualified as a district surveyor. In 1838 he began the spectacular Gothick tower at Hadlow Castle, a late eighteenth century house in Kent. The tower was based in part on James Wyatt's at Fonthill Abbey. It was built of brick rendered in Roman cement to imitate stone, the finer architectural detail built up with the cement. He had previously used the Gothick style at a church in Walham Green, Fulham in 1827-8.

He designed, and developed, as flats, the block of buildings on the east side of Trafalgar Square which later became Morley's Hotel. He received some attention from William IV, and claimed to have persuaded the king that the new open space at Charing Cross should be called "Trafalgar Square" rather than ‘King William the Fourth Square", as originally proposed.

In 1843–8 he laid out large parts of the Bishop of London's estate, Westbourne Terrace (where he built a house for himself), Chester Place, and parts of Hyde Park Square and Gloucester Square. Around 1851, Taylor designed William Batty's Grand National Hippodrome, also known as Batty's Hippodrome, a 14,000 person open-air arena near Kensington Gardens and the Crystal Palace Exhibition.

Taylor was the architect and joint surveyor to the Regent's Canal Railway Company, which, in 1845, proposed to fill in the Regent's Canal between Paddington and Limehouse and use its route for a railway. In 1849 he undertook the continuation of the North Kent railway from Stroud, through Chatham, and Canterbury to Dover, but the negotiations fell through, at a personal loss to Taylor of £3,000.

After this he abandoned architecture for archæology. In 1856 he revisited Italy with his wife, and stayed at Rome from November 1857 to March 1858, collecting materials for The Stones of Etruria and Marbles of Antient Rome, which he published in 1859. He finally returned to England in 1868, and in 1870–2 published a collection of sketches and descriptions of buildings which he had visited during his travels, under the title of The Auto-Biography of an Octogenarian Architect.

Taylor died at Broadstairs on 1 May 1873.
