= SS Duke of Connaught =

A number of steam-powered ships were named Duke of Connaught, including:

- PS Duke of Connaught
- TSS Duke of Connaught

== See also ==
- SS Connaught
