= George Gutch =

British architect and surveyor

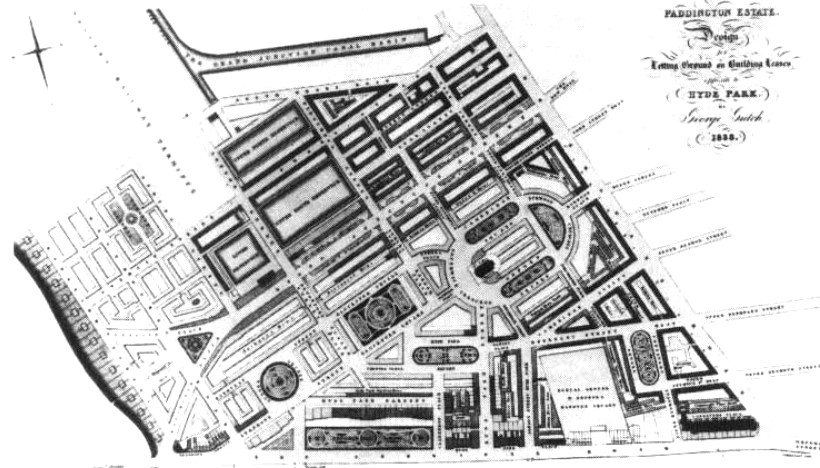
Gutch's final plan for Tyburnia, 1838.

George Gutch (1790-1894) was a British architect and to four successive Bishops of London surveyor for much of the Diocese's c. 500-acre (2.0 km^{2}) southern strip of the parish of Paddington.

== Background ==
Gutch was son of Rev. John Gutch, rector of St Clement's and registrar of the University of Oxford.

== Achievements ==
His work helped to realise much of the 1824 masterplan promoted and drawn by Samuel Pepys Cockerell. Gutch laid out roads, communal garden areas and designed certain of the grand terraces, now listed buildings (statutorily protected) in Hyde Park Square and adjoining streets. This was part of his Final Plan for Tyburnia of 1838, which enlisted other architects for some buildings such as George Ledwell Taylor. These still private-housing dominated neighbourhoods in Bayswater focus on and have been widely, popularly, re-branded Lancaster Gate and Connaught Village.

He was District Surveyor for more than 50 years for Paddington as a parish-turned-district.

Gutch was tasked to finish the designs for St James' Church, Sussex Gardens, in what is now termed Lancaster Gate (with or without optional suffixes, Bayswater, Paddington) (c. 1841) as John Goldicutt died. The latter's proposed an equally yellow brick but to be cleanly neo-classical. Gutch changed the style and embellishments to Gothic. The building was extensively changed by G.E. Street in 1882.
