= Connaught Place, London =

Street in the City of Westminster

Coordinates: 51°30′48.7″N 0°9′42.9″W

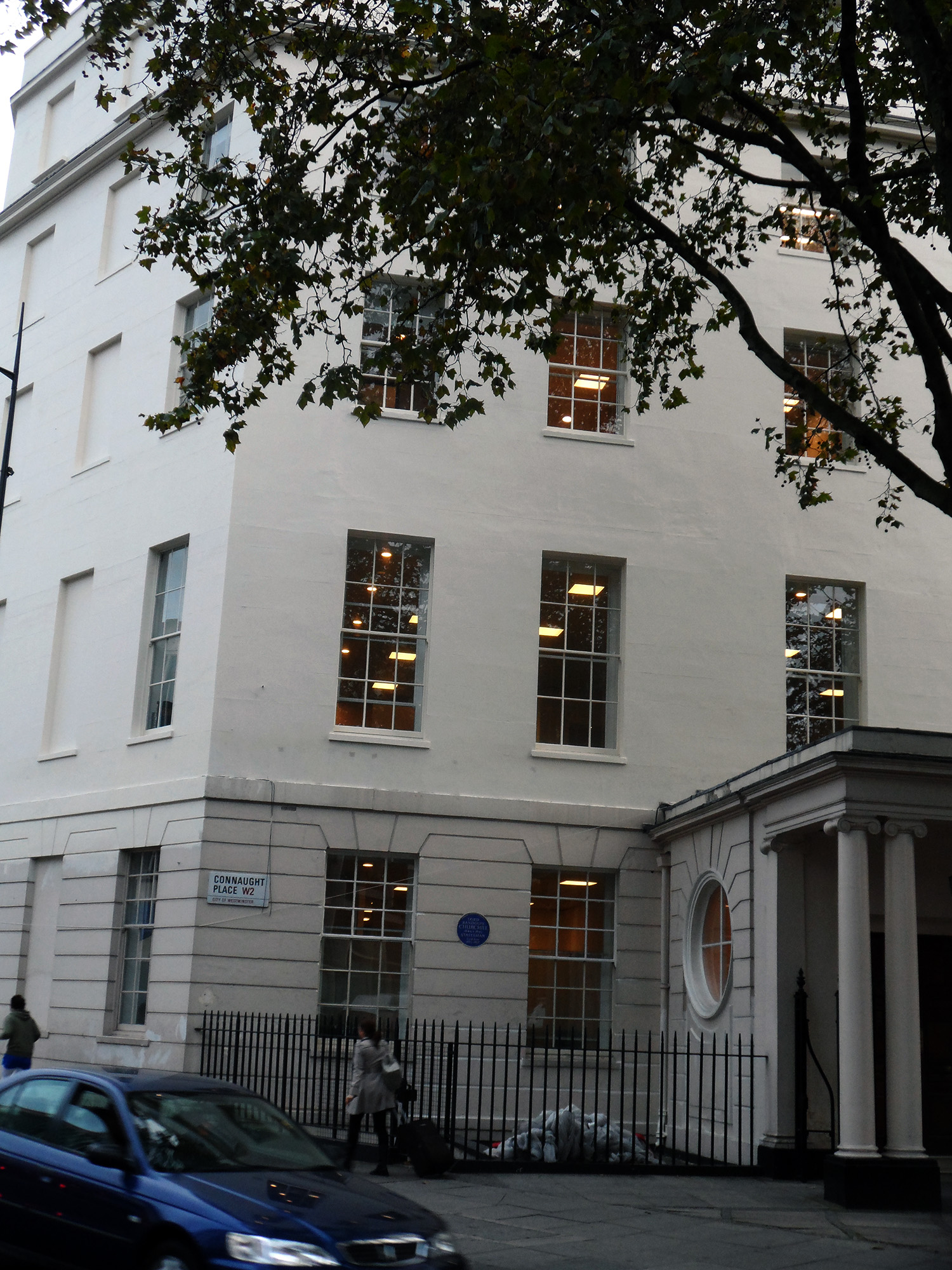
Building in Connaught Place.

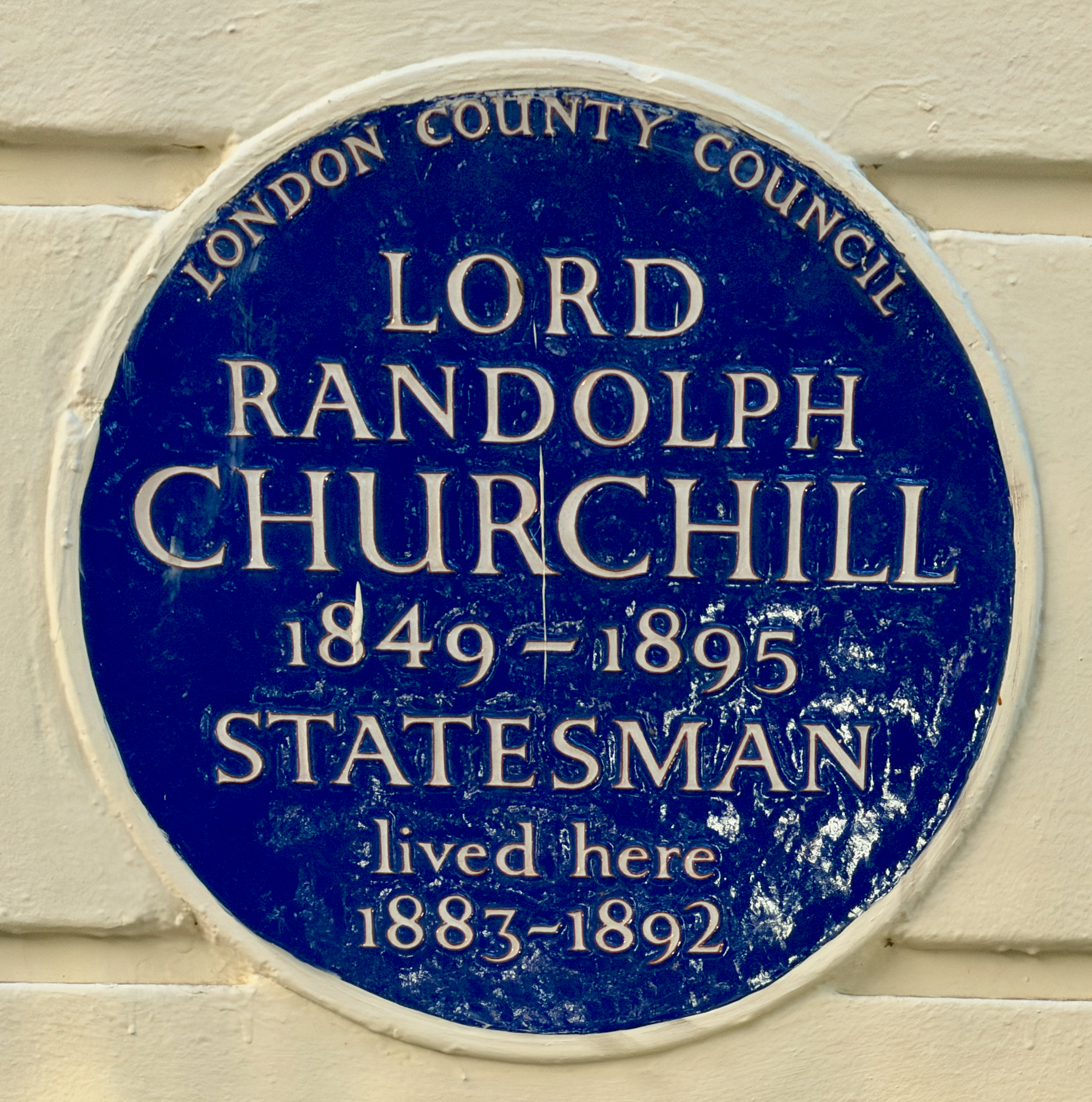
Blue plaque for Lord Randolph Churchill.

Connaught Place is an area in the Bayswater area of the City of Westminster (a London Borough). The nearest London Underground station to Connaught Place is Marble Arch which is a few minutes to the East near Marble Arch walking past the site of the Tyburn Tree.

Located at the edge of Hyde Park, Connaught Place is framed by Edgware Road, Bayswater Road, Seymore Street and Stanhope Place. Connaught Street and Connaught Square are located nearby. The head offices of the Premier League and Experian are located here, as is the Matlock Bank, Mayfair Conference Centre, The Victory Services Club, and various companies

A blue plaque at number 2 records the residence there of Lord Randolph Churchill from 1883 to 1892. Idina Sackville was living in Connaught Place in 1914.

The art dealer Asher Wertheimer, who commissioned John Singer Sargent to do the Wertheimer portraits, lived at 8 Connaught Place. Alexander Beresford Hope lived at 1 Connaught Place, Sir John Murray Scott at number 5, Frederick David Mocatta at number 9, and Constance Flower at number 10 after 1907.
