= Gloucester Square =

Garden square in London

Coordinates: 51.51439°N 0.17099°W

Original houses on the south side of Gloucester Square

Gloucester Square is a garden square in the Paddington area of London. More specifically, the square is part of the layout of the late Georgian and early Victorian Tyburnia development.

== History and description ==
Proposed names for the square included Bloomfield Square and Devonshire Square before eventually Gloucester Square was chosen in reference to the nearby townhouse of William, Duke of Gloucester a cousin of George IV.

The square is the largest in Tyburnia, and is adjacent to Hyde Park Square, connected at its southeast corner. Building work began around 1840, with houses built in the standard stucco-fronted style of the area. Its east and west consisted of houses fronting directly onto the central gardens, designed by George Ledwell Taylor none survive, while the north and south are separated from the gardens by the road. Taylor also designed the remaining survivors on the south side of the square which are now Grade II listed. Nos. 44-49 form a single unified facade with a centre of six engaged Corinthian columns. Beginning in the 1920s, a number of the buildings were converted or remodelled. Despite limited bomb damage during the Second World War, most of the square was rebuilt with modern blocks of flats in the decades following the war.

Notable former residents of the square include Robert Stephenson, Joseph Samuda, George Murray Smith and John Sadleir who was famous for committing suicide in Hampstead Heath after his fraud was discovered.
