= Connaught Square =

Square in London, England

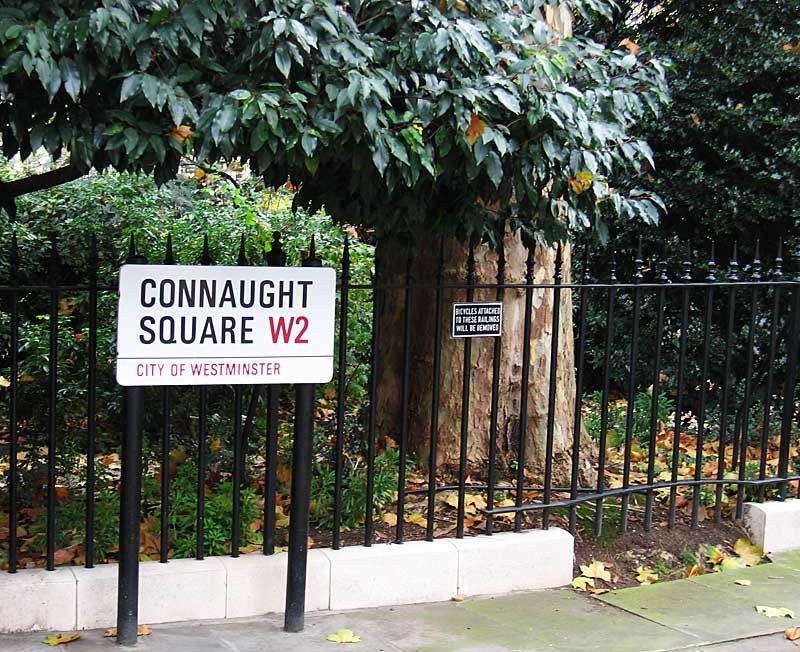
- Connaught Square, London – predominantly four-storey terraced houses surrounding a private communal garden planted with mature trees, shrubs and flower beds.
- Interactive map of Connaught Square
- Namesake: Earl of Connaught
- Maintained by: (1) Westminster City Council (2) building owners as to the garden
- Length: 400 ft (120 m)(internally)
- Width: 186 feet
- Addresses: 1–22A; 23–30; 32; 34–45; 47 (44 buildings, built as large homes, some subdivided)
- Location: City of Westminster, London
- Postal code: W2
- Nearest Tube station: Marble Arch
- Coordinates: 51°30′52″N 0°9′50″W

Construction
- Inauguration: 1828

Other
- Known for: Former London home of leading politician Tony Blair and his wife Cherie.
- Status: Existing

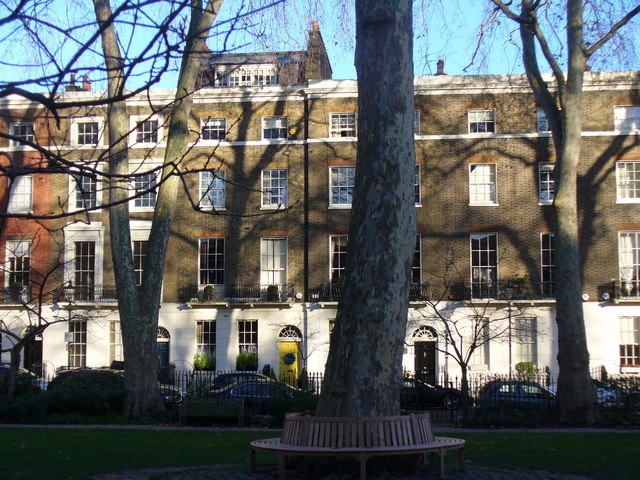
Looking eastwards across the private garden

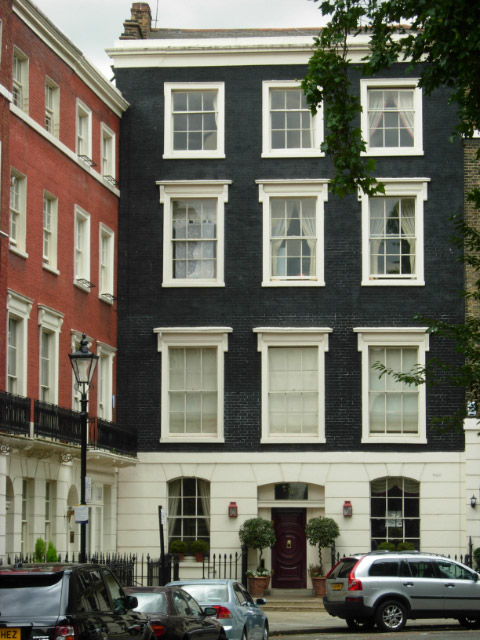
An example of Connaught Square's Georgian architecture

Connaught Square in London, England, was the first square of city houses to be built in Bayswater. It is named after a royal, the Earl of Connaught who was from 1805 until death in 1834 the second and last Duke of Gloucester and Edinburgh, and who maintained his fringe-of-London house and grounds on the land of this square and Gloucester Square. Its appearance is essentially the same as in the 1820s. Its south-east is 115 metres north of Hyde Park and the same west of Edgware Road. This point is 302 m (991 ft) WNW of Marble Arch, which sits on a very large green roundabout (including sculptures and public fountains) marking the western end of Oxford Street. Connaught Street runs along its northern end.

== Architecture ==
Connaught Square's architecture is primarily Georgian. Redevelopment was initially planned in the early 18th century and the first of its 45 brick houses was built in 1828 as part of the Hyde Park Estate by Thomas Allason. Having built the Square, Thomas Allason (1790–1852) and family remained living at no 1 Connaught until well past his death in 1852.

== Community ==
Residents of Connaught Square hold an exclusive summer party in the central communal garden every year. The garden square is maintained by the owners of the adjoining properties who contribute to its upkeep, and in return are issued keys to the garden. Such gated gardens are a particular feature of this area of London. The horses of the Royal Artillery regularly do their early morning rides down Connaught Street.

== Notable residents ==
In October 2004, serving Prime Minister Tony Blair and his wife Cherie bought as their home a house on this square for £3.5 million; as at 2007 the policing of which was an all-hours rota giving at least four on-duty Metropolitan Police Service Diplomatic Protection Group officers.

Other famous residents have included:

- No.5 – Nigel Balchin – author
- No.14 – Marie Taglioni – ballerina (resident from 1875 until 1876)
- No.15 – Fanny Kemble – actress, author, playwright and poet (resident from 1877 to 1879)
- Claudia Winkleman – television presenter, broadcaster and writer

== Other buildings ==
Aside from predominant residential use, the buildings host a very small primary school and doctor's surgery. A garage specialises in classic cars on northern approach way Connaught Street. To the west are the shops of Connaught Village and a long-standing Chinese restaurant, which was among the many meeting places of high-level corrupt talks regarding Bruce Grobbelaar, footballer.

== In film, fiction and the media ==
In fiction, Lionel Holland lives at No.242 in the film Kind Hearts and Coronets.

== Proximity to the Tyburn Tree ==
The single-most frequented gallows, the Tyburn Tree, for public judicial execution in London, was nearby. Most sufficient-scale 18th century maps mark out an area by the edge of the top a very broad rise which is a block or so north along Edgware Road as having, in rough drawing to symbolise obsolescence, such a landmark tree. Relatedly, Oswald's Stone or Ossulstone stood for centuries on the corner of Edgware Road and Oxford Street/Road (formerly also called Uxbridge Road), and was an equally prominent landmark of Middlesex and of the most populous hundred (see Hundred Court), providing a cultural focus and marking out the place of early meetings of the justices of the peace and lords of the many Ossulstone manors more generally.

The real site of this spot [the gallows] is a matter of public dispute. An iron slab opposite the end of Edgware-rd, and about 50 yards W. of the Marble Arch, professes to designate the precise location; but № 49 Connaught Square, some two or three hundred yards N.W. of that spot, disputes with it the doubtful honour, as does also the portion of the Edgware-rd at the corner of Bryanston-st.

— Dickens Dictionary of London, 1889

Peter Ackroyd recites a list of anecdotes and archaeological finds supportive of pre-18th century mass burials where much of Connaught Place stands. No greater evidence is given for second theory above.

== See also ==
- Connaught Square (Thunder Bay)
- List of eponymous roads in London
- Squares in London

== Nearby places ==
- Knightsbridge
- Notting Hill
- Paddington
- St John's Wood
- Westminster

== Nearest tube stations ==
- Marble Arch
- Edgware Road (Bakerloo Line)
- Edgware Road (Circle, District and Hammersmith & City Lines)
