= Connaught Village =

Area in the City of Westminster, London

Coordinates: 51°30′52″N 0°9′58″W

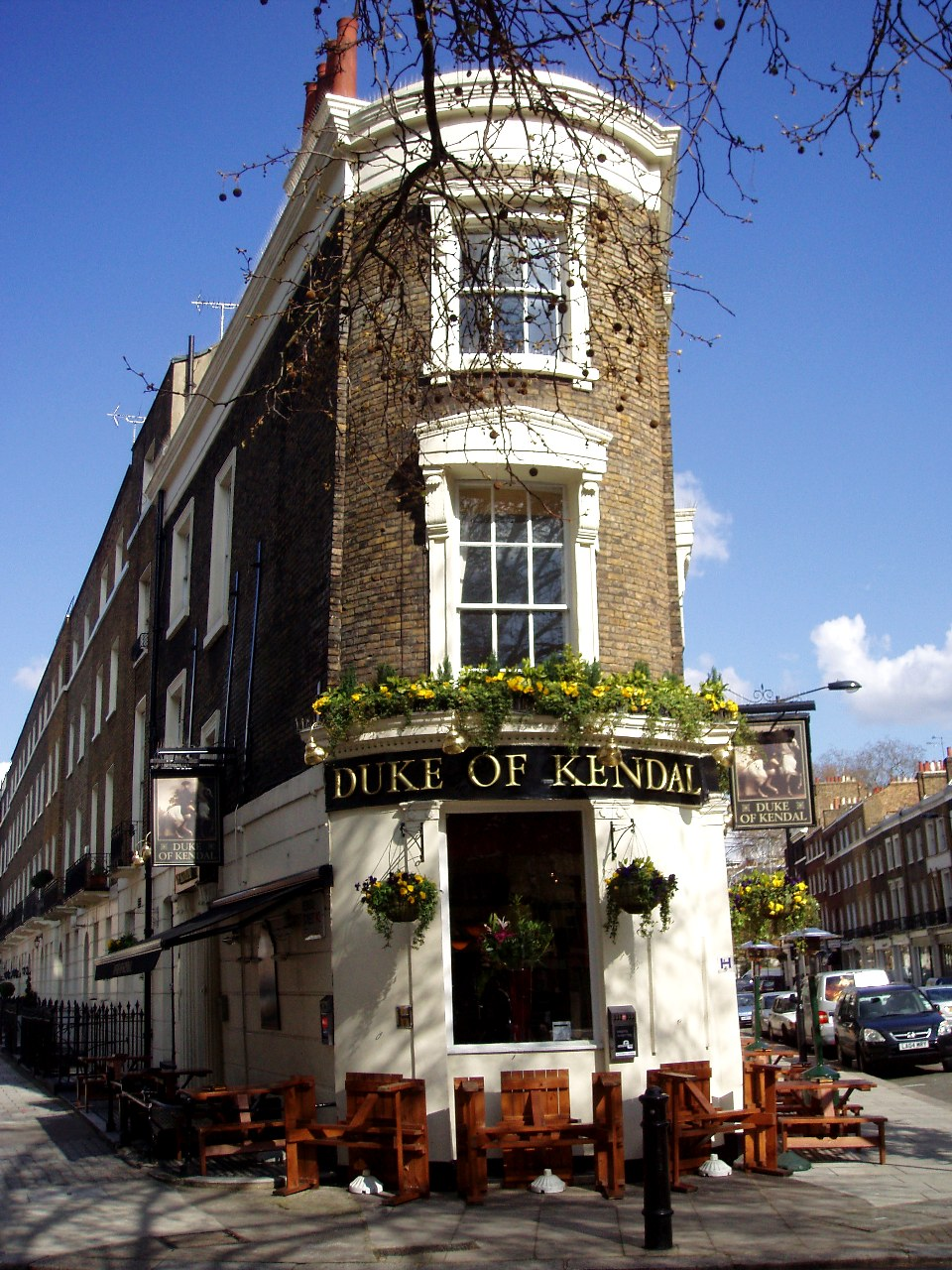
Duke of Kendal pub in Connaught Village

Connaught Village is a commercial and residential area just west of Marble Arch and just north of Hyde Park within the City of Westminster, London. As part of the Hyde Park Estate, it is owned by the Church Commissioners of England. Numerous boutiques, designer shops and restaurants reside in Connaught Village and it is often referenced as a hidden gem that you can spend many hours meandering around. The couture store of famous shoemaker Jimmy Choo was previously located here. Tony Blair, former leader of the Labour Party and Prime Minister, used to live in Connaught Square.

In 2025 a new “village green” was created, by converting some car parking spaces in the centre of the village into a pedestrianised area (albeit still with adjacent roads for through-traffic). This includes a number of new flower beds as well as benches for seating.

== Nearest places ==
- Paddington
- Notting Hill
- Marble Arch
- Hyde Park Speakers' Corner
- Connaught Square
