= Samuel Pepys Cockerell =

English architect (1753–1827)

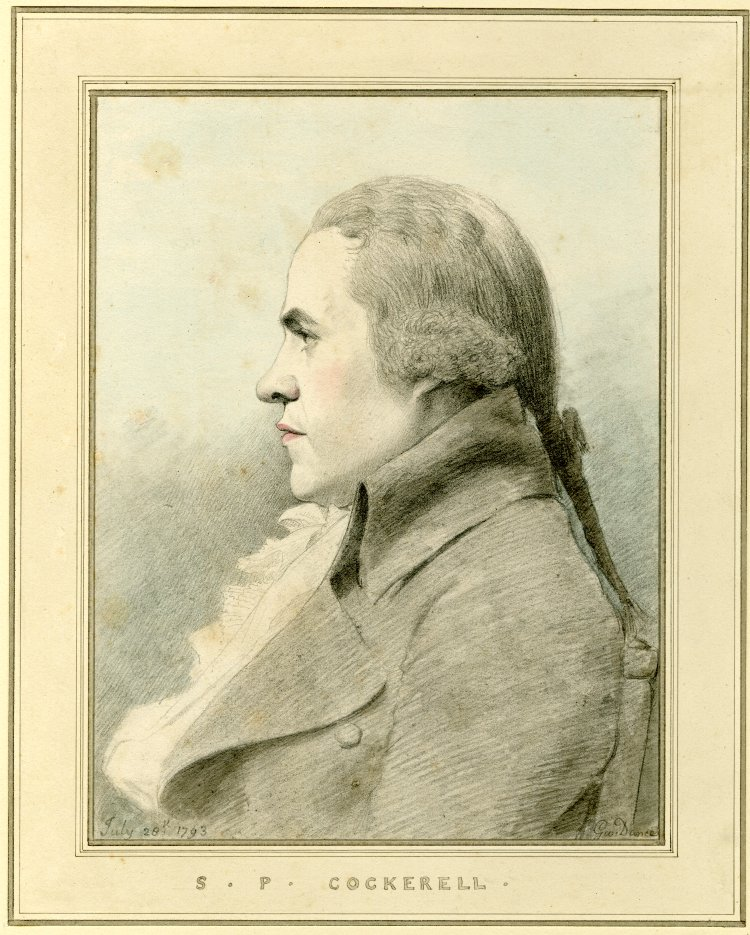
- Born: 15 February 1754
- Died: 12 July 1827 (aged 73)
- Occupation: Architect
- Spouse: Anne Whetham (m. 1782)
- Children: 11, including Charles
- Buildings: Sezincote House
- Projects: Bayswater

Samuel Pepys Cockerell (15 February 1753 – 12 July 1827) was an English architect.

He was a son of John Cockerell, of Bishop's Hull, Somerset, and the elder brother of Sir Charles Cockerell, 1st Baronet, for whom he designed the house he is best known for, Sezincote House, Gloucestershire, the uniquely Orientalising features of which inspired the more extravagant Brighton Pavilion. He was a great-great nephew of the diarist Samuel Pepys.

== Life ==
Cockerell received his training in the office of Sir Robert Taylor, to whom he allowed that he was indebted for his early advancements, which were largely in the sphere of official architecture. In 1774 he received his first such appointment, as Surveyor to the fashionable West End London parish of St George's Hanover Square. In 1775 he joined the Royal Office of Works as Clerk of Works at the Tower of London, largely a sinecure; in 1780 the clerkship at Newmarket was added. In spite of his reputation for diligence and competence, he lost these posts in the reorganisation of the Office of Works in 1782.

At the death of Taylor in 1788, Cockerell succeeded Sir Robert as Surveyor to the Foundling Hospital and Pulteney estates. In 1790 he presented the board of governors of the Foundling Hospital a project for the development of their considerable estate in Bloomsbury, London, which proceeded according to his plans, until he resigned and was succeeded in the post by his pupil Joseph Kay. He continued Taylor's work designing Admiralty House, Whitehall, as residence for the First Lord of the Admiralty, 1786–88.

Cockerell designed the architecture of much of the Bayswater area of London, including Sussex Gardens, but in other urban planning schemes he was less successful. As surveyor to the Bishop of London he drew up plans for the building up of the diocesan estate in Paddington, but the scheme had only been begun, with Connaught Square, at the time of Cockerell's death, and a different plan was completed under his successor as Surveyor, George Gutch. Another abortive development about the same time was for a "Carmarthen Square" on the Mortimer estate in Bloomsbury; eventually the land was purchased for the University of London. He designed a new tower for St Anne's Church, Soho in 1803.

From 1806 he was employed as Surveyor to the East India Company.

Among country houses, besides Sezincote he designed Daylesford, Gloucestershire, a few miles distant from Sezincote, for another returned nabob, Warren Hastings. Cockerell was approached by Hastings in July 1788, before Cockerell's appointment as Surveyor to the Admiralty. He had built an entrance and bridge at Whiteknights, near Reading, in Berkshire, for William Byam Martin, an acquaintance of Hastings'. Cockerell received payments through 1793, amounting to £13,300, for the house, for which Hastings spent some £60,000. In the severely undecorated elevations finished in warm golden Stanway limestone, windows are simply pierced in the ashlar masonry without even moulded surrounds. The central three-bay feature of the three-storey garden front, between projecting two-storey end ranges, is a hemicircular projection crowns by a low dome, with an order of attached columns of a rich Composite order. The dome reverses curves to rise in the centre to a ball finial, a discreetly Indian feature. Cockerell's entrance front has been considerably altered.

Cockerell also designed Middleton Hall, Carmarthenshire, now the home of the National Botanic Garden of Wales.

Cockerell's pupils included the architect Benjamin Henry Latrobe (1764–1820), who emigrated to the United States in 1795 and worked on the White House and the United States Capitol and Benjamin Gummow. His son, Charles Robert Cockerell, who trained in his office, also went on to become a famous architect.

Samuel Pepys Cockerell is named on a plaque outside the OBE Chapel at St Paul's Cathedral as 'Surveyor to the Fabric of St Paul's Cathedral' between 1811 and 1819.

In 1797, Cockerell handled the sale of the Fotheringhay, Northamptonshire, estate of Rev. Abraham Blackborne of Dagenham, Essex, and St. Martin-in-the-Fields, Westminster.

== Family ==
He married Anne Whetham on 18 June 1782, and had issue eleven children (five sons and six daughters). Of them, Charles Robert Cockerell (1788–1863) became an architect; Richard Howe Cockerell (1798–1839) became a Captain RN, but died in Calcutta shortly before his projected return 1840. Richard's daughter Anna Theresa Cockerell (1836–1912) became Countess of Shrewsbury.

His elder brother Colonel John Cockerell (1752–1798) bought the land at Sezincote, and left it to their younger brother Charles (1755–1837) MP between 1802 and 1837, who became Sir Charles Cockerell, 1st Bt on 25 September 1809, shortly after his 1808 remarriage to Hon. Harriet Rushout. Between 1805 and 1820, the Cockerell brothers designed and built Sezincote House together.
