= Thomas Chatfeild-Clarke =

English architect (1829 – 1885)

- Born: 22 August 1829; Newport, Isle of Wight, England
- Died: 28 June 1895 (aged 65); 132 Westbourne Terrace, London
- Resting place: Highgate Cemetery
- Occupation: Architect
- Spouse: Ellen Nettlefold

Thomas Chatfeild-Clarke (22 August 1829–28 June 1895) was an architect, surveyor and politician.

== Early life and family ==
Chatfeild-Clarke was born in 1829 in Newport, Isle of Wight, to parents Abraham Clarke, a farmer, and his wife Jane (née Chatfeild) In 1859 he married Ellen Nettlefold (1826–1901), daughter of John Sutton Nettlefold of Birmingham and cousin of Joseph Chamberlain They had six children, all sons: Howard (1860–1917), Temple (b. and d.1862), Edgar (1863–1925), Robert (1867–1941) and Cecil (1869–1947). The family were strong Unitarians and this had a powerful influence on Thomas's career and commissions.

In 1874 he built a house for himself, Oakfield, at Wootton on the Isle of Wight. It survives, now in multiple occupancy. A large house with oriel windows, multiple gables and half-timbering, it displays Arts and Crafts influences.

== Professional Qualifications and Honours ==
In 1862 he became a Fellow of the Royal Institute of British Architects (RIBA). He was also a Fellow of the Royal Institution of Chartered Surveyors (RICS), having been a founder member of its forerunner, The Institution of Surveyors. He became its vice-president in 1888 and President in 1894. He was surveyor to the Cordwainers’ Company, the Fishmongers’ Company, Dr Williams's Library and to other public institutions.

== Professional Practice ==
After finishing his articles with Richard Tress, an architect and surveyor, who had a varied practice in the City of London, he commenced independent practice in 1855. From 1884 he entered into partnership with his eldest son Howard, practicing as T. Chatfeild Clarke & Son.

== Politics and public matters ==
Politically, Chatfeild-Clarke was a Liberal. He was the president of the Isle of Wight Liberal Union, and an obituary described him as "the leader of the Liberal Party in the [Isle of Wight] division". He unsuccessfully contested parliamentary seats for the Liberal Party on three occasions. At a by-election in Poole in 1884, he lost by 62 votes to the Conservative Party candidate William James Harris. At Hammersmith at the 1885 general election, he lost to Conservative candidate Walter Tuckfield Goldsworthy by 4,261 votes to 3,095. At Grantham at the 1892 general election, he lost by 33 votes to Henry Lopes, 1st Baron Roborough of the Conservative Party. He represented Finsbury on the first and second London School Boards from 1870 to 1876. He was also connected to liberal political causes such as the Society for the Liberation of Religion from State Patronage and Control, served as president of the British and Foreign Unitarian Association, and sat as a magistrate for the county of Hampshire and for the town of Newport.

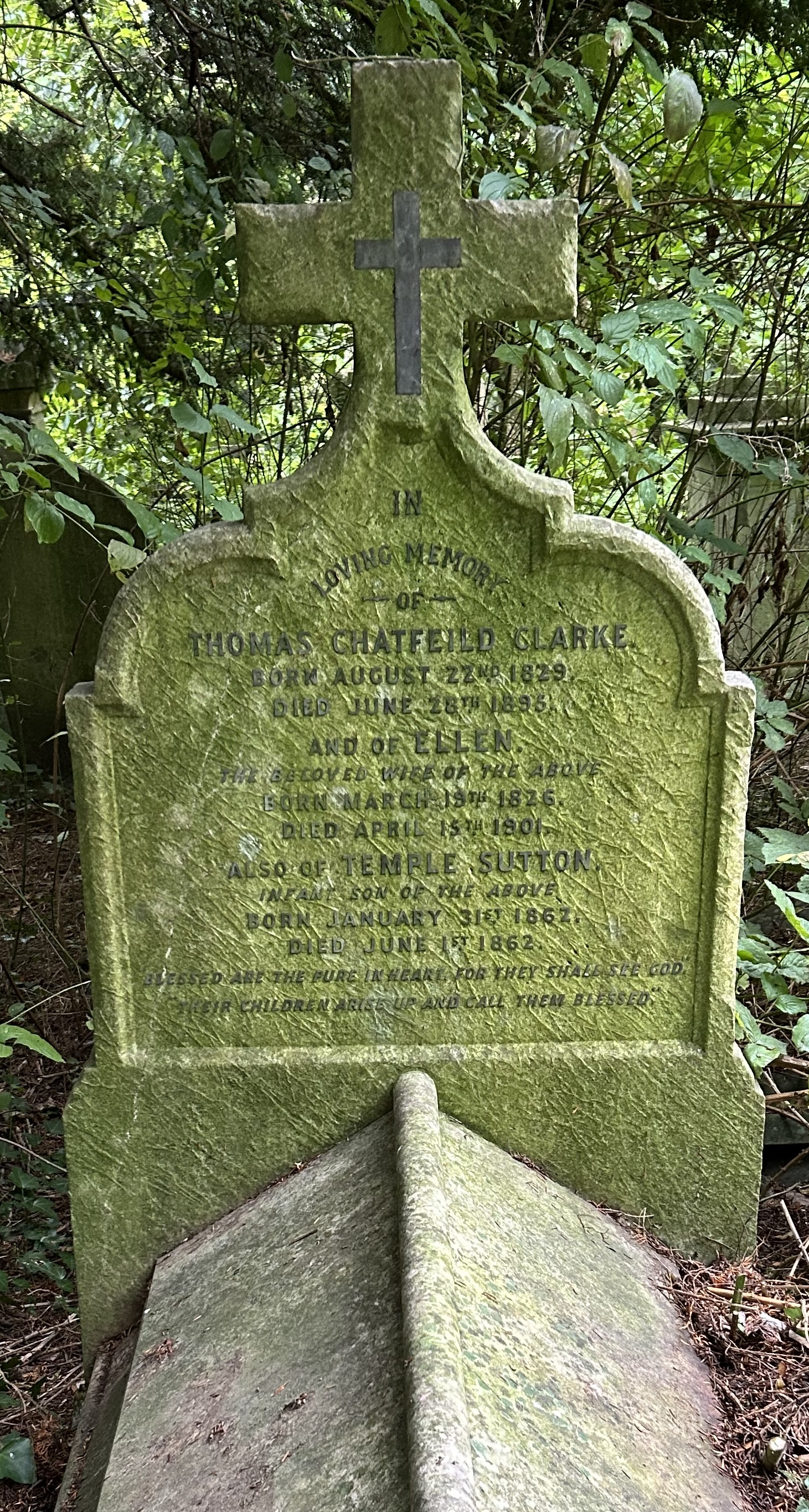
Grave of Thomas Chatfeild-Clarke in Highgate Cemetery

== Later life ==
He died at his house in Westbourne Terrace on 28 June 1895 and left a fortune of £104,000. His son Howard continued the practice after his father's death. He is buried in the dissenters section of the western side of Highgate Cemetery with his wife Ellen and his infant son, Temple. His wife probably chose Highgate Cemetery because the Nettlefold family home was in The Grove, Highgate. There is a memorial stained glass window in the Unitarian Church, Newport, Isle of Wight, where he worshipped when on the island and where a memorial service was held on 7 July 1895.

== Selected works ==
- 1862: Unity Church, Upper Street, Islington, London
- 1863: Nettlefold and Chamberlain, Heath Street Screw Mill, Birmingham, extension
- 1866: New Sion Chapel, 212 Whitechapel Road, London, E1
- 1867: Little Tongue Yard, Whitechapel Road, London, E1
- 1869: Unitarian Church, West Ham Lane, London, E15
- c. 1870: 26 Throgmorton Street, London, EC2
- 1871: Schools, Church Street, Mile End, London, E1 (now Fournier Street, Spitalfields)
- 1871: Church of Our Lady and St Wilfrid, Ventnor, Isle of Wight (destroyed by fire 2006)
- 1872: Church of St Lawrence, Wootton St Lawrence, Hampshire: north vestry
- 1874: Premises, St Brides, Ludgate Hill, London, EC4
- 1874: Oakfield, Beech Lane, Wootton Common, Ryde, Isle of Wight
- 1874: Handcross Park, Handcross, West Sussex: a mansion for John Warren. All but the stables were demolished in 1938 and replaced by the present buildings
- 1874–76: Church of St John, Southbourne, West Sussex
- 1877: Mary Datchelor School, 3–5 Camberwell Grove, London, SE5
- 1877: London Domestic Mission Society, 2–6 Dingley Place, London, EC1
- 1877: Royal Bank of Scotland, 3 and 5 Bishopsgate, London, EC2
- 1877: 1–5 Clerkenwell Road and 8–10 Charterhouse Buildings, London, EC1
- 1880: London & Lancashire Life Assurance Company, 66–67 Cornhill, London, EC3
- 1880: Nettlefold and Chamberlain offices, Broad Street, Birmingham
- 1881: Herts Convalescent Home, West Hill Road, St. Leonards-on-Sea, East Sussex
- 1882: Mill for Nettlefold and Chamberlain, Baskerville Place, Birmingham
- 1884: Church of St Edmund, Church Road, Wootton Bridge, Isle of Wight: new organ chamber (now Lady chapel) and bell-cot
- 1885: The Daily News offices, Bouverie Street, London, EC4
- 1885–86: Essex Hall, Essex Street, London WC2, for the British and Foreign Unitarian Association
- 1887: 385–397 Oxford Street, London, W1 (Drawing in The Builder 1884 of similar premises in Oxford Street)
- 1890: The Central Foundation School for Girls, Spital Square, London, E1
- 1893: Mercers’ School, Barnard's Inn, High Holborn, London, EC4

== Bibliography ==
- Bullen, Michael; Crook, John; Hubbuck, Rodney; Pevsner, Nikolaus (2010). Hampshire: Winchester and the North. The Buildings of England. London: Yale University Press. ISBN 978-0-300-12084-4.
- Jones, Edgar (1987). A History of GKN, Volume 1, Innovation and Enterprise, 1759-1918. London: Macmillan. ISBN 0-333-34594-0.
- Lloyd, David W.; Pevsner, Nikolaus (2006). The Isle of Wight. The Buildings of England. London: Yale University Press. ISBN 978-0-300-10733-3.
- Rowe, Mortimer (1959). The History of Essex Hall. London: Lindsey Press. Archived from the original on 16 January 2012.
- Williamson, Elizabeth; Hudson, Tim; Musson, Jeremy; Nairn, Ian (2019). Sussex: West. The Buildings of England. London: Yale University Press. ISBN 978-0-300-22521-1.
