= Westway (London) =

Elevated dual carriageway section of A40 road in West London

Coordinates: 51°30′56″N 0°13′15″W

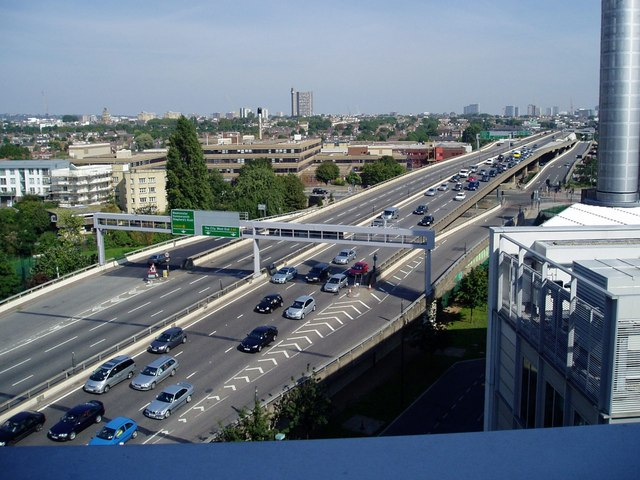
The Westway looking east. On the horizon is Trellick Tower.

The Westway is a 2.5-mile (4 km) elevated dual carriageway section of the A40 trunk road in West London running from Paddington in the east to North Kensington in the west. It connects the London Inner Ring Road to the West London suburbs.

The road was constructed between 1962 and 1970 to connect the proposed London Ringways motorway scheme to Paddington, and opened as the A40(M). It was the first urban motorway project in London and attracted criticism for the lack of care over the environment, the well-being of local residents and communities, and the handling of those whose homes would be demolished. Road protests increased following its opening. In 2000, the Westway was downgraded to an all-purpose road after the formation of Transport for London. The road has become a significant London landmark and has been noted in several works of popular culture.

== Route ==
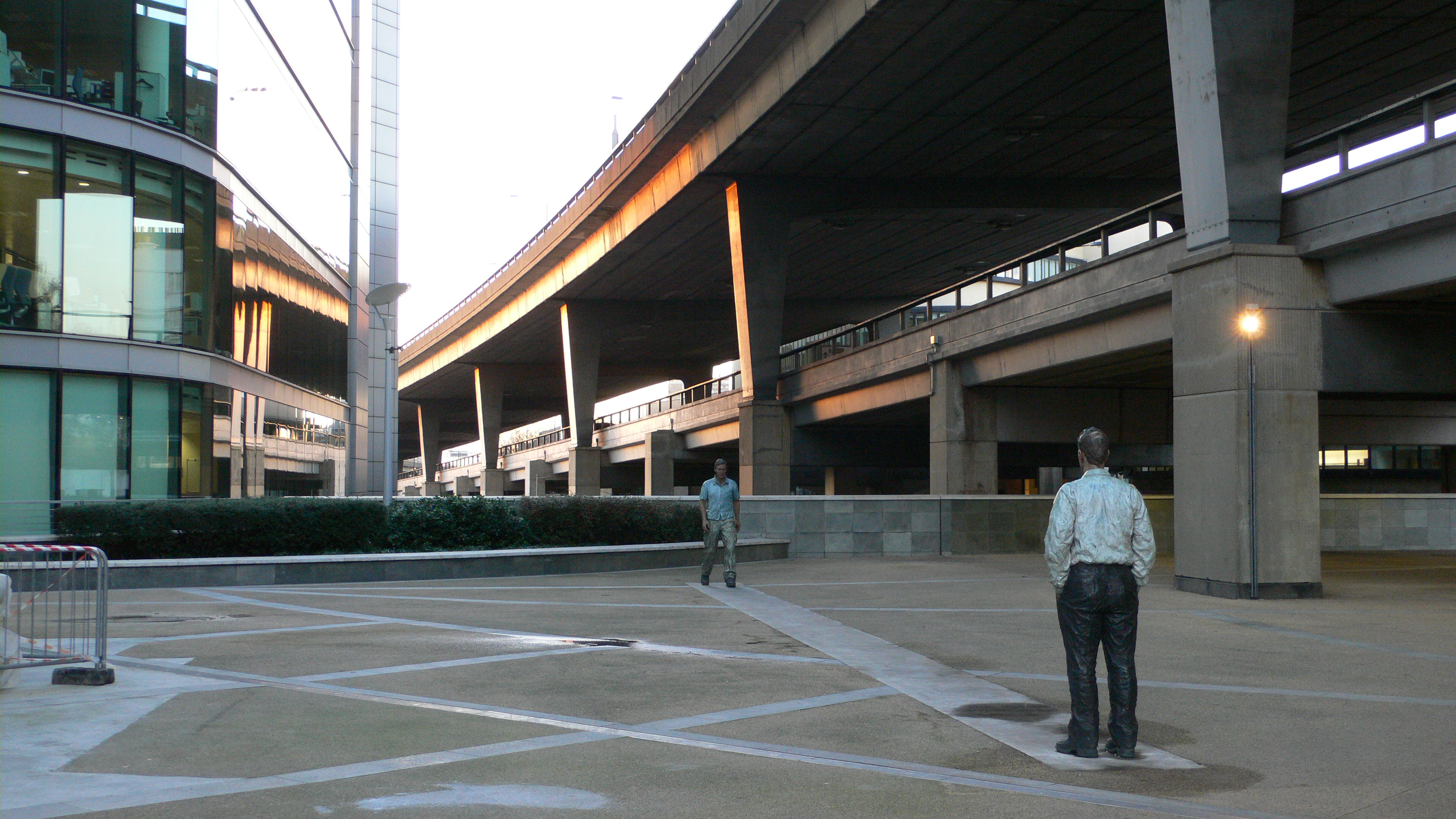
Walking Man and Standing Man near Paddington. The Westway with the westbound carriageway of the Harrow Road (A404) on the lower tier.

The road is 2.5 miles (4 km) long and is located in the City of Westminster and the Royal Borough of Kensington and Chelsea. At its eastern end, the Westway starts to the west of the Marylebone Flyover (A501), which takes traffic over the junction of Edgware Road (A5) and Marylebone Road (part of the London Inner Ring Road). Between the Westway and the flyover, a section of surface-level road allows westbound traffic from the flyover to turn-off on to the Harrow Road (A404) or eastbound traffic from the Harrow Road to access the flyover. Eastbound traffic from the Westway cannot exit here to reach the Edgware Road and continues on to the flyover.

Heading west, the Westway rises as it passes Paddington Green and crosses the Grand Union Canal branch to Paddington Basin. As the road passes Westbourne Green on the north and Royal Oak Underground Station on the south, it gains a lane from a climbing slip-road from Gloucester Terrace. Eastbound, one lane diverges from the mainline to a sliproad crossing the railway to Paddington station via Westbourne Bridge. The bridge once carried traffic from Harrow Road to Bishops Bridge Road but was blocked at the north end and appropriated for the Westway scheme.

Continuing westward, the Westway runs parallel with the Great Western Main Line, before turning south-west at Westbourne Park and crossing the railway to run immediately adjacent to London Underground's Hammersmith & City line as far as Ladbroke Grove station. The road then returns to an east–west alignment to the elevated roundabout junction with the West Cross Route (A3220) and flyover above this, crossing the Central line and Wood Lane (A219) before returning to ground level and continuing to the junction with Old Oak Common Lane where Westway connects end-on to the eastern end of Western Avenue. From the elevated road between Westbourne Park and Ladbroke Grove, Trellick Tower is visible to the north; east of the roundabout, the site of Grenfell Tower is visible to the south.

With the extension westward of the London Congestion Charge Zone between 19 February 2007 and 4 January 2011, the part of the road between Westbourne Park and the Westway roundabout that passed through the zone was designated as a "free through route" that allowed vehicles to cross the zone without paying the charge.

== Background ==
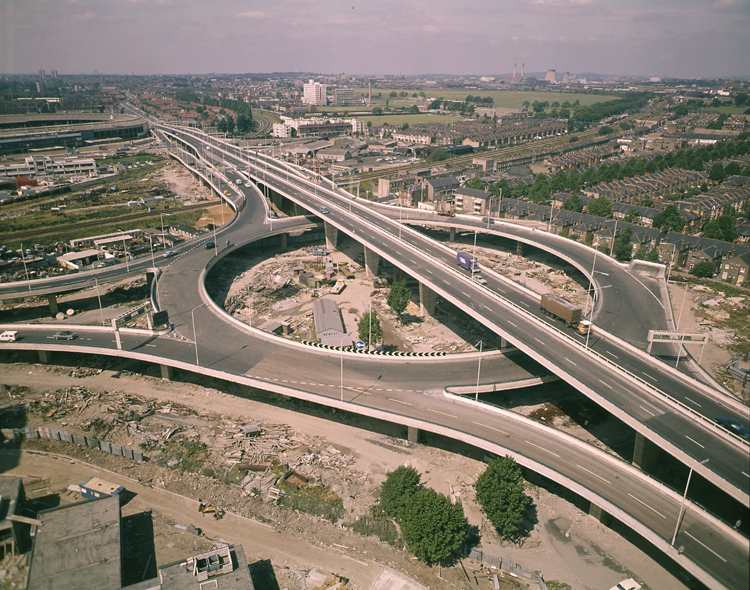
The elevated roundabout connecting the Westway with the West Cross Route, 1970.

The Westway was built as an extension of Western Avenue to form a link from Paddington to Ringway 1, the innermost circuit of the London Ringways network, part of a complex and comprehensive plan for a network of high speed roads circling and radiating out from central London designed to manage and control the flow of traffic. This plan had developed from early schemes prior to World War II through Patrick Abercrombie's County of London Plan, published in 1943, and the following year's Greater London Plan, to a 1960s Greater London Council (GLC) scheme that would have involved the construction of motorway-standard roads across the city, requiring substantial demolition. The elevated roundabout junction with the West Cross Route was built with the capability to be extended once the planned northern continuation of the latter road was constructed to Harlesden. Two stubs on the roundabout's north side were built for the connection of slip roads and the alignment of the slip roads between the West Cross Route and the roundabout avoided the planned line of the road to the north.

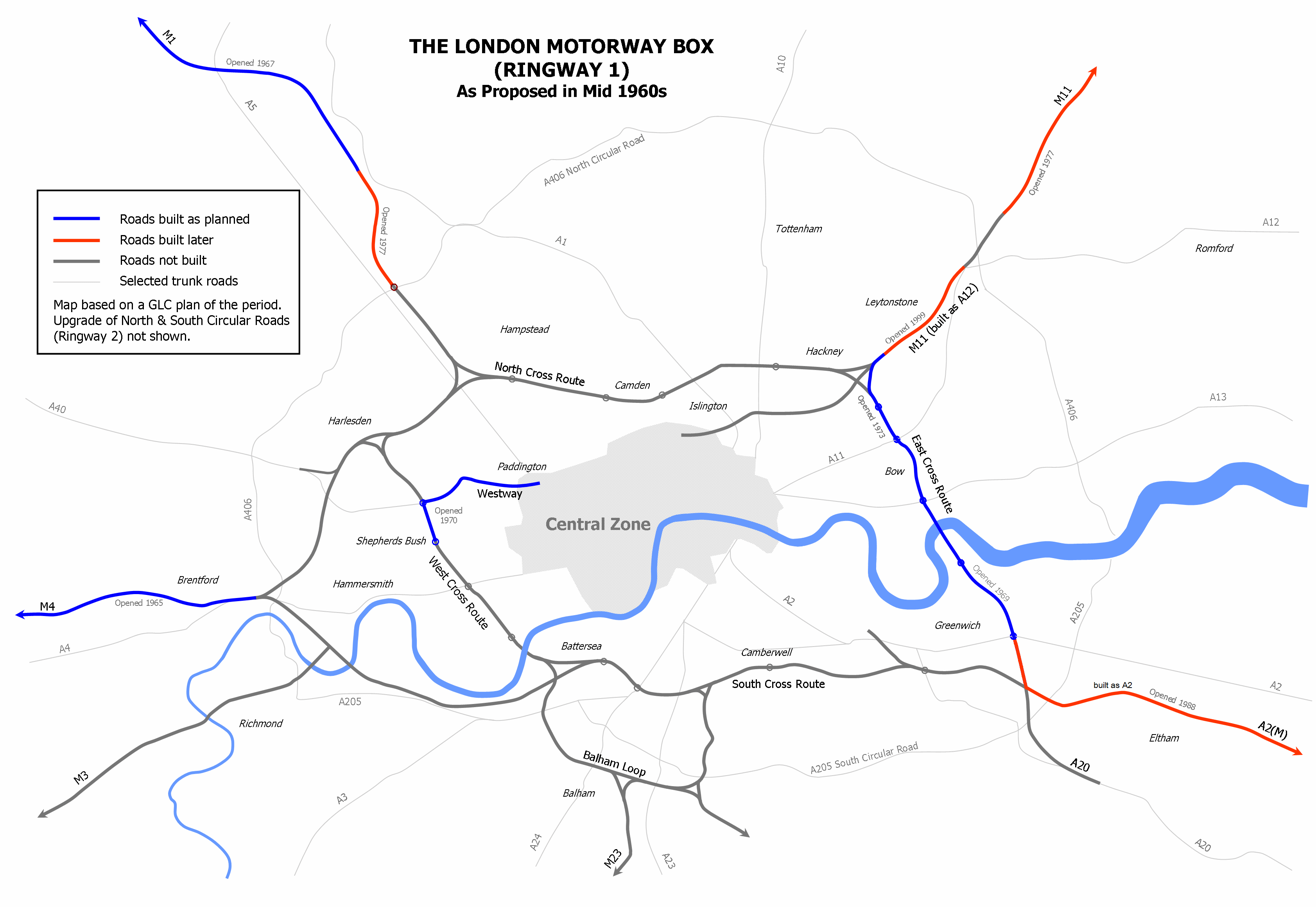
Proposed Motorways in Central London scheme from the mid-1960s, showing the Westway

== Construction ==
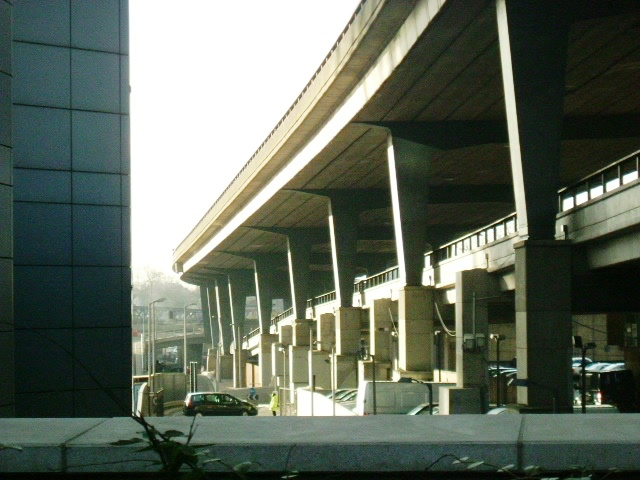
The Westway running above a rerouted Harrow Road as a double-decked road structure

The Westway was funded by the GLC with a 25% grant from central government. The main contractor was John Laing & Sons, while the flyovers at the eastern end were engineered by Sir Bruce White and Partners.

The road was planned to support three lanes in each direction, but was upgraded to include hard shoulders in 1966. The route was chosen to follow the easiest path from Western Avenue to Paddington which paralleled existing railway lines. To the east, the GLC had purchased slums between Harrow Road and the Grand Union Canal for redevelopment, and the Westway was planned to run along the southern edge of this. An elevated road was cheaper to construct and required less land to be directly built on, and had worked well for previous road construction projects, such as elevated section of the M4 from Chiswick to Langley and the Five Ways interchange at Hendon. However, passing an eight lane elevated motorway through a densely populated area involved the clearance of a large number of buildings adjacent to the railway, particularly in the area west of Westbourne Park, where several roads were truncated or demolished to make way for the concrete structures. (Note: Latimer Road is an example of a truncated and partially demolished road. The road was truncated by the structures of the Westway and elevated roundabout, with a 450-metre (0.28 mi) section of the road south of the roundabout renamed Freston Road. Latimer Road Underground station is now 400 metres (0.25 mi) from the road after which it is named.) London County Council architect Hubert Bennett speculated that some sections of the road viaduct would pass within 20 feet (6.1 m) of people's homes.

Compulsory purchases of properties began in 1962, with an estimated 3,356 people needing to be rehoused. Many properties on the line of the route were put on short-term rental or left derelict. The local area was disrupted by the flow of heavy goods traffic moving materials to the construction site and taking spoil away. The road was mostly constructed from pre-stressed and post-tensioned concrete, which was cast offsite and moved into position as required. Tensioning cables were then passed through conduits cast into the sections and tightened to achieve the bearing capacity necessary to carry the weight of traffic. Joints between sections were minimised in order to provide a smoother journey. The road was designed with a main speed of 50 miles per hour (80 km/h) aside from the sliproads, which were designed for 30 miles per hour (48 km/h). All elevated sections of the road were designed to support HA loading plus 45 units of HB loading in any direction. (Note: HA loading is the standard weight distribution for normal vehicles up to 44 tonne gross weight as defined in the Road Vehicles (Authorised Weight) Regulations 1998. HB loading is defined in units of 10 kilonewtons of weight per vehicle axle.)

Prince Charles visited the construction work in 1968, aged nineteen. The road was opened to traffic by the Minister of Transport John Peyton and junior transport minister Michael Heseltine on 28 July 1970 at a total cost of £30 million (£411 million in 2025), and classified A40(M). At its opening the road was the largest continuous elevated structure in Europe and was constructed with some advanced features, such as heating grids on slopes to control the formation of ice. After completion a corridor of wasteland remained below the motorway, which the government had no plans to develop.

== Environment ==
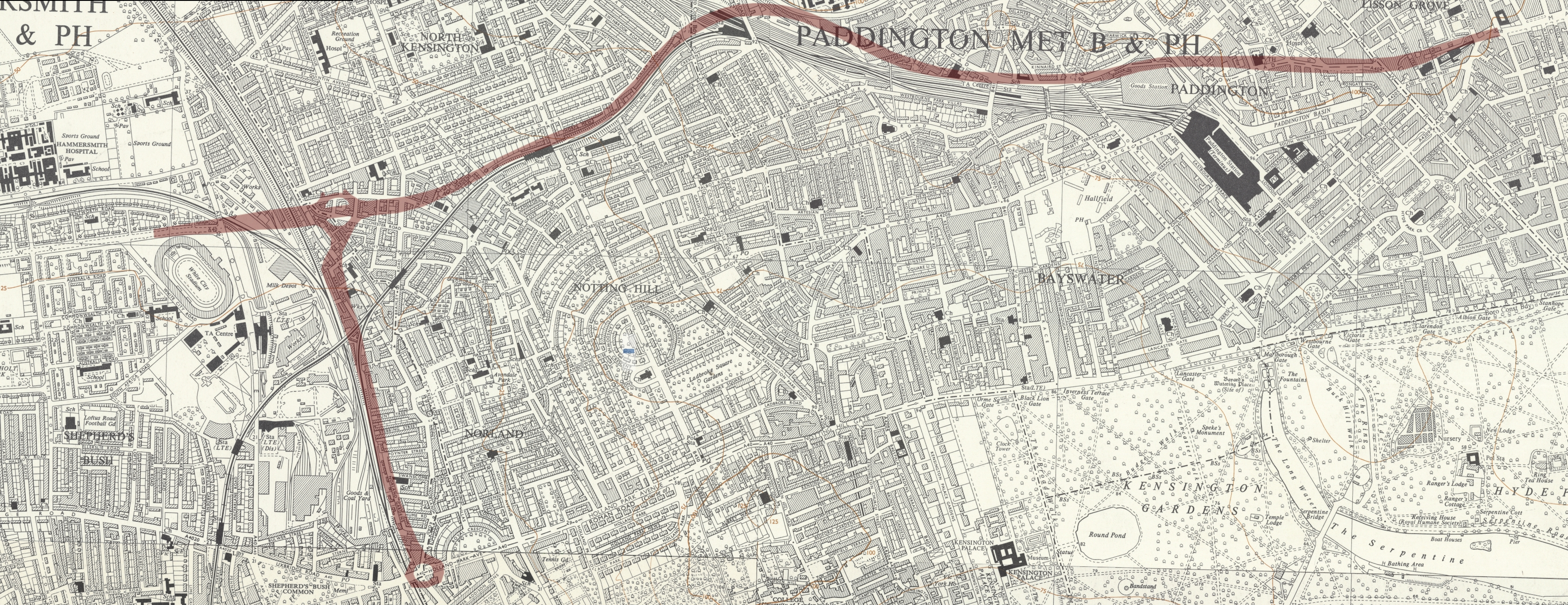
Route of Westway, West Cross Route and Marylebone Flyover overlaid on 1957 Ordnance Survey map showing areas which were demolished for the roads' construction

The Westway was planned and constructed in an era before environmental impacts were routinely considered, and it caused controversy at the time for the effects it and the vehicles it carried had upon the local community and the environment. At the opening ceremony, Heseltine was jeered by protesters armed with placards. A group of squatters moved into vacant houses on Freston Road near to those demolished for the Westway, forming a so-called "independent state" of Frestonia.

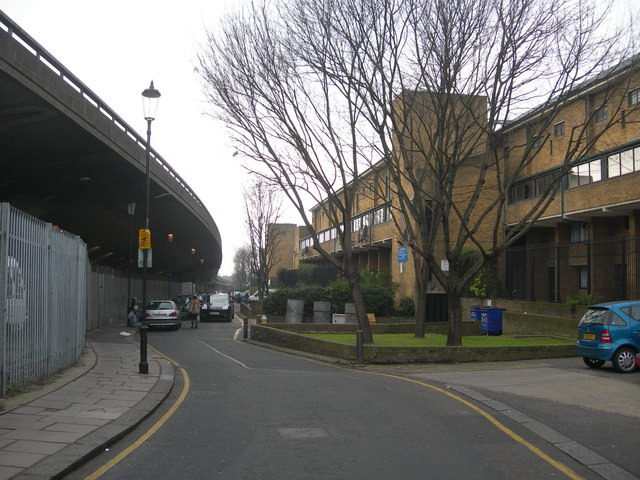
Acklam Road was redeveloped as flats following residents' complaints about noise from the Westway.

Residents on Acklam Road, which ran parallel to the Westway between Ladbroke Grove and Westbourne Park, draped a large banner across several houses reading "Get us out of this hell! Rehouse us now!" Locals complained about having to use Westbourne Terrace and Gloucester Terrace, both residential streets with several listed buildings, as access roads for the Westway. Shortly after opening, a group of residents planned to blockade the motorway and stop traffic in protest at the excessive noise of the road. Eight houses on Walmer Road, North Kensington, severed by the construction of the Westway, were planned to be demolished and their residents re-homed, but there were no plans for other nearby properties. Until 1973, there was no legal obligation to compensate anyone living outside the boundaries of the highway, no matter how close their property was or what nuisance the road may have caused.

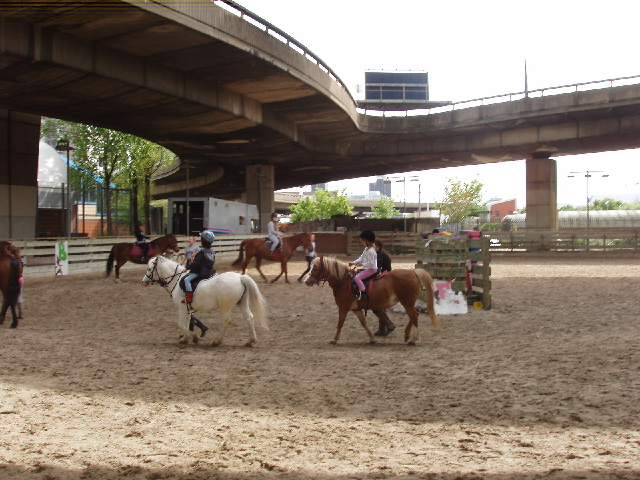
Attempts have been made to regenerate the once-abandoned land.

On 9 August 1970, the Westway was closed for an hour after a group of 80 protesters marched along the road carrying placards. Four people were arrested. The following month, the GLC announced that a further 28 homes on Walmer Road would be compulsorily purchased and the residents moved, in order to build a new school. In March 1971, it was announced that all 41 homes on Acklam Road would be demolished. By 1972, it had been estimated approximately 5,000 families had lost their homes for each mile of the Westway constructed. In 1974, the GLC announced 11.5 acres (4.7 ha) of land in Notting Hill to the north of the Westway would be compulsorily purchased and redeveloped with new apartments and screening walls to reduce noise from the motorway.

The project has since been condemned for the negative effect it had on local communities and housing, and contributed to the increased interest in anti-road protesting. The British Road Federation called the Westway "one of the insensitive and socially unacceptable examples of motorways." The North Kensington Playspace Group was established in 1966 by Adam Ritchie, who strongly criticised the Westway, saying "a more inappropriate and negative use for the space could not be imagined". The North Kensington Amenity Trust (now Westway Development Trust), was founded in 1971 to develop the land for local community use. Since 2000, local charity Urban Eye has initiated a programme of cleaning, painting, and lighting to improve the visual appearance and safety of the areas under the flyover structure.

== Aftermath ==
Because of the construction costs and public opposition of the Westway, most of the London Ringways scheme was cancelled in 1973. The Westway, the West Cross Route and East Cross Route in east London were the only significant parts to be built. Other parts of the Ringway network were later built as all-purpose roads, including the M11 link road from Hackney to Redbridge, which drew major protests and opposition.

Westway lost its motorway status in May 2000 when responsibility for trunk roads in Greater London was transferred from the Highways Agency to the Greater London Authority. In 2013, the Mayor of London, Boris Johnson, announced parts of the Westway would be reconstructed to allow a separated cycleway to be built on it. The space required would be provided by reducing vehicle capacity. These plans were abandoned in 2016.

== Cultural references ==
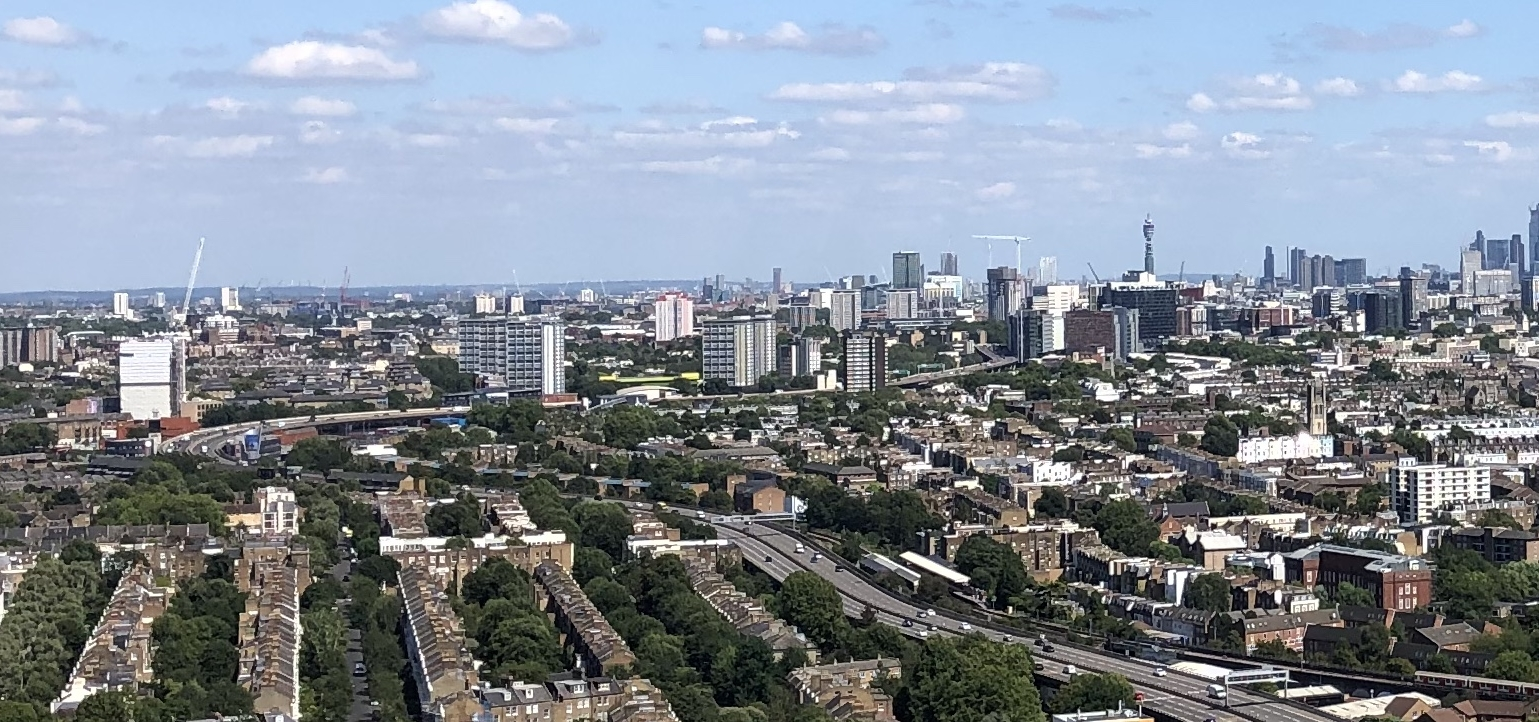
The Westway running through the streetscape of London

The Westway is referred to in J. G. Ballard's 1973 novel Crash. The following year's Concrete Island was set in a junction between motorways, one of which is the Westway. In the novel, the protagonist has an accident on the road while speeding and is consequently stranded in waste ground between motorways with nobody able to help. The 1997 murder mystery A Certain Justice by P. D. James was set in an area being demolished for the Westway, referring to houses "rising in great choking clouds of ochre dust".

Chris Petit's 1979 road movie Radio On includes several shots of the Westway. The land underneath the road was used as a setting for riots in the films Breaking Glass and Sammy and Rosie Get Laid. Episode Mangrove of the anthology series Small Axe features a time lapse visual effects montage of the Westway construction. Westway was a BBC World Service radio series that ran from 1997 until 2005. It featured the community surrounding the road.

The Westway has featured in songs by several British rock bands. The Clash referred to the road in "London's Burning", and the group's Joe Strummer described their music as "the sound of the Westway". The group's documentary Westway to the World is named after the road. Swiss post-punk group Chin Chin used the same turn of phrase for the title of their 1985 LP The Sound of the Westway. The cover for The Jam's 1977 album This Is the Modern World was taken under the Westway. Blur's 1993 song "For Tomorrow" mentions that the protagonist couple in the song are "lost on the Westway", and the road is mentioned in two other songs by the band, "Fool's Day" and "Under the Westway". Dirty Pretty Things refer to the Westway in the song "Truth Begins"; the opening lyrics are "The Westway walls so tall and bleak / Reflect the words we dare not speak".

Local groups from the Ladbroke Grove scene, notably Hawkwind and the Pink Fairies, played several free benefit and charity concerts underneath the motorway, pictures of which appeared on the inner sleeve of Hawkwind's second album In Search of Space. One such concert by the Pink Fairies under the Westway – disrupted by the police because a neighbour complained that was unable to hear his television over the noise – is referenced in the track "Right On Fight On" on their second album What A Bunch Of Sweeties.

The opening track on Sky's 1979 debut album is entitled "Westway". The Westway is referenced in Pete Doherty's "Broken Love Song", in the line "By the Westway, Inside The Scrubs", as he claimed to have once lived beside the Westway in a caravan. It is also featured on the front cover of A Weekend in the City by Bloc Party. The picture, part of A Modern Project was taken by German photographer Rut Blees Luxemburg. The Westway is also seen in various shots in the 1990 movie Nuns on the Run.
