= Rafter (name) =

Rafter is both a given name and a surname.

== Surname ==
- Athol Rafter (1913–1996), New Zealand nuclear chemist
- Charles Rafter (1860–1935), British police officer
- Clifford Marle (real name Patrick Cassamer Rafter, born 1885), successful actor and producer of the early 20th century, appearing in several silent films.
- Henry Rafter (born 1830), British master artist and former Headmaster of School of Arts of Coventry
- Jack Rafter (1875–1943), Major League Baseball catcher
- John Rafter Lee, British actor, voice actor, professional narrator
- Kevin Rafter, Irish journalist and academic
- Kitty Clive (née Rafter) (1711–1785), British actress of considerable repute on the stages of London
- Michael Rafter, American arranger, musical director, musical supervisor and conductor
- Mike Rafter, rugby union coach and former Bristol and England flanker
- Nicole Hahn Rafter, Feminist criminology professor at Northeastern University
- Orlaith Rafter, Irish actor, novelist and playwright
- Patrick Rafter, Former World Number One tennis player
- Captain Seamus Rafter (1873-1918), IRA commandant for Wexford, Ireland during the 1916 Rising
- Colonel William Rafter (died 1819), executed in Panama following his capture at the Spanish retaking of Porto Bello, South America.

== Given name ==
- Rafter Bats, artist who has taken part in a concert Gathering of the Vibes in 2001
- Rafter Roberts, musician and producer of rock band Rafter of San Diego, U.S.

== Fictional characters ==
Ben Rafter, Dave Rafter, Melissa Rafter, Nathan Rafter, Rachel Rafter, Sammy Rafter, Julie Rafter and Ruby Rafter are roles in the television series Packed to the Rafters.

== See also ==
- Raft (disambiguation)
- Rafter (disambiguation)
- Rafting (disambiguation)
