= Rafter (disambiguation) =

A rafter is a structural member to support a roof deck.

Rafter may also refer to:

- Rafter, someone employed in timber rafting, i.e. the floating of timber rafts down rivers from forests to the woodyards
- Balseros (rafters), the name given to persons who emigrate in self constructed or precarious vessels from Cuba to neighbouring states
- Rafter J Ranch, Wyoming, a census-designated place in Teton County, Wyoming, United States
- Operation RAFTER, a MI5 radio receiver detection technique

In culture:

- Rafters (nightclub), a nightclub in Manchester, UK
- Rafter Romance, a 1933 RKO comedy/romance film
- Packed to the Rafters, an Australian family-oriented comedy-drama television series, 2008
- Spoon and Rafter, the fourth album by the British country rock-folk group Mojave 3, 2003
- Blue Rafters, the edition from DC Comics which protagonist is Klarion the Witch Boy
- Rafter (band), a rock band of San Diego, U.S.
- The Rafters Restaurant, opened by Jack Flavell near Wolverhampton, Wales, UK
- Rafters, a New Jersey off-price women's clothing store chain of Reynolds Brothers

In sport:

- Pat Rafter Arena, a Queensland Tennis Centre court named in honour Patrick Rafter
- Surprise Rafters, a baseball team of Surprise, Arizona, U.S.
- Wisconsin Rapids Rafters, a baseball team of Wisconsin Rapids, Wisconsin, U.S.
- Orange River Rafters, South Africa field hockey club

People:

- Rafter (name), a given name and surname
- Patrick Rafter, an Australian tennis player

== See also ==
- Rafting (disambiguation)
