= Matthew Digby Wyatt =

British architect and art historian (1880–1820)

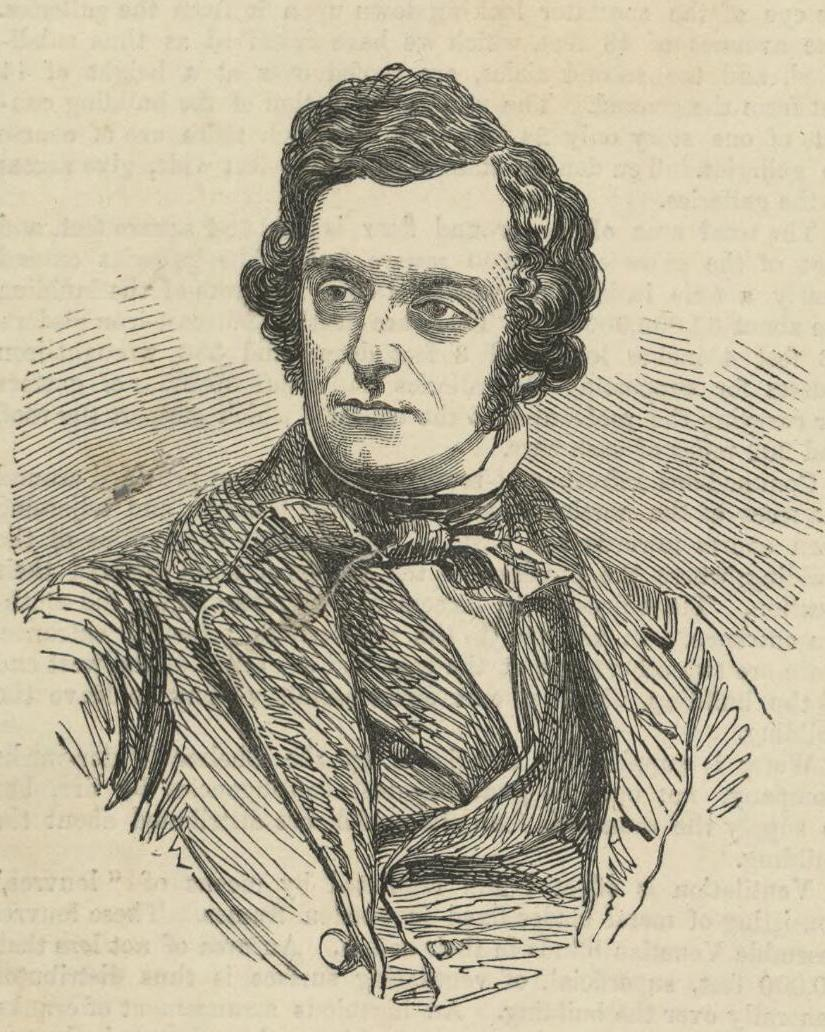
Matthew Digby Wyatt, 1851

Sir Matthew Digby Wyatt (28 July 1820 – 21 May 1877) was a British architect and art historian who became Secretary of the Great Exhibition, Surveyor of the East India Company and the first Slade Professor of Fine Art at the University of Cambridge. From 1855 until 1859 he was honorary secretary of the Royal Institute of British Architects, and in 1866 received the Royal Gold Medal.

== Life ==
Born in Rowde, Wiltshire, Wyatt trained as an architect in the office of his elder brother, Thomas Henry Wyatt. He assisted Isambard Kingdom Brunel on the terminus of the Great Western Railway at London Paddington (1854). He also enlarged and rebuilt Addenbrooke's Hospital in Cambridge (1866: now the Judge Institute of Management). He designed the Rothschild Mausoleum in the Jewish Cemetery at West Ham.

In 1851, Wyatt produced the book The Industrial Arts of the Nineteenth Century, an imposing imperial folio in two volumes which illustrates a selection of items from the Great Exhibition of 1851. The book, which has won widespread acclaim for the quality of its plates, appeared in two parts, with the first dated 1 October 1851, through to the extra-illustrated title pages dated 15 March 1853. There are 160 chromolithographed plates produced by a team of artists and lithographers including Francis Bedford, J. A. Vinter and Henry Rafter.

He was appointed to the post of Surveyor of the East India Company in 1855, shortly before its role in governing India was taken over by the Crown, and subsequently became Architect to the Council of India. In this role he designed the interiors of the India Office in London (1867: now part of the Foreign & Commonwealth Office) and the Royal Indian Engineering College (1871-3: now the Runnymede campus of Brunel University).

A paper on the construction of the exhibition building read before the Institution of Civil Engineers in 1866 was awarded the Telford medal.

His work included, c. 1869, a substantial private residence, known as 'Newells', not far from Leonardslee at Lower Beeding, near Horsham in Sussex, as mentioned in A History of the County of Sussex: Volume 6. Newells had been occupied as a preparatory school for boys from 1946 until destroyed by fire in 1968. Photographic images of the exterior and interior of the house, when occupied by the prep. school, can be seen at an external link given in the article 'Newells Preparatory School'. His other commissions in Sussex included Possingworth Manor and Oldlands near Herron's Ghyll.

Amongst the pieces he worked on was Robert Stephenson Works of Newcastle upon Tyne 1295 of 1862. This 2-2-4T for the Egyptian Railways survives with its marquetry in the Egyptian Railway Museum in Cairo. It is called the Khedive's Train.

In 1870, for the Secretary of State for India, Wyatt oversaw the conversion of the Elm Grove House estate at Hanwell into the new Royal India Asylum, which opened in August 1870.

== Selected publications ==
- A report on the eleventh French exposition of the products of industry. London: Chapman and Hall. 1849.
- Metal-work and its artistic design : dedicated, by express permission, to the Right Hon. Henry Labouchere. Printed in colours and published by Day & Son, lithographers to the Queen, 17, Gate Street, Lincoln's Inn Fields. 1852.
- with J. B. Waring: The Byzantine and Romanesque court in the Crystal Palace. Crystal Palace Library,7. Crystal Palace Library and Bradbury & Evans. 1854.
- with P. H. Delamotte: Views of the Crystal Palace and park, Sydenham. London: Day and Son. 1854.
- with Edmund Oldfield and J. A. Spencer: Notices of sculpture in ivory, consisting of a lecture on the history, methods, and chief productions of the art, delivered at the first annual general meeting of the Arundel society, on the 29th June, 1855. London: The Arundel Society. 1856.
- with W. R. Tymms: The art of illuminating as practised in Europe from the earliest times : illustrated by borders, initial letters, and alphabets. Day and Son. 1860.
- Fine art: a sketch of its history, theory, practice and application to industry. Macmillan and Co. 1870.
- An architect's note-book in Spain: principally illustrating the domestic architecture of that country. Autotype Fine Art Company (Limited), 36, Rathbone Place. 1872.

== See also ==
- Wyatts, an architectural dynasty
- Royal Institute of British Architects
- The Pitt Club in Cambridge, designed by Wyatt
- Newells Preparatory School, Sussex private residence designed by Wyatt
