= Orsett Terrace =

Street in Westbourne, London

Coordinates: 51°31′3.69″N 0°11′4.39″W

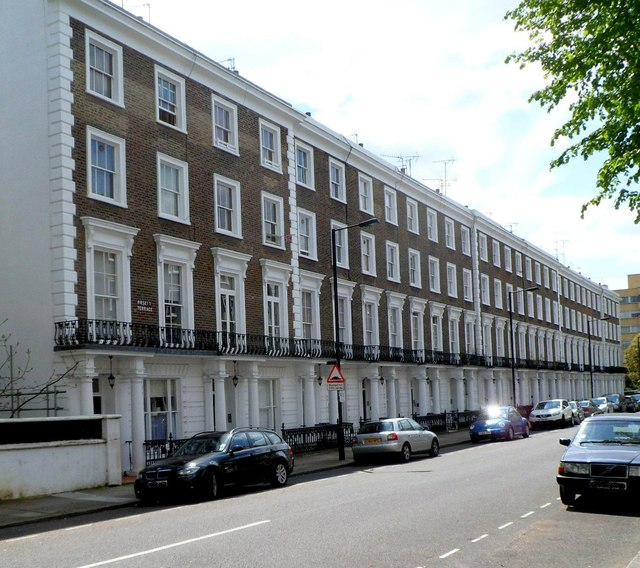
Houses on Orsett Terrace

Orsett Terrace, originally known as Orsett Place, is a street in the Westbourne district of the City of Westminster, in London. It runs roughly east–west between Porchester Terrace in the west and the junction of Westbourne Bridge and Westbourne Terrace in the east. It is crossed midway by Gloucester Terrace.

== Buildings ==
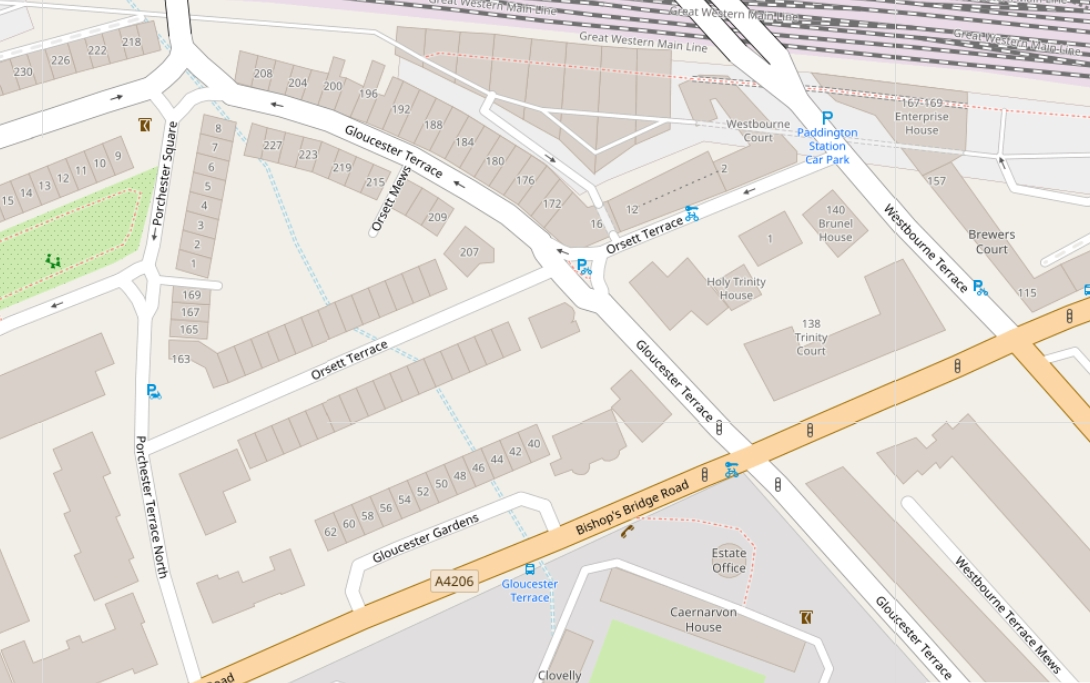
The vicinity of Orsett Terrace (centre, diagonal)

Orsett House on the south side, an Italiante stucco villa at number 1, is grade II listed. It was designed by George Ledwell Taylor in 1843–48. The Russian political theorist Alexander Herzen lived there from 1860 to 1863 and a blue plaque marks the fact.

Westbourne Court, a mansion block completed in 1938, is on the north side on the corner with Westbourne Bridge.

The long terraces on both sides at the western end of the street are both grade II listed with Historic England.
