= Newells Preparatory School =

Coordinates: 51.032°N 0.260°W

Information
- Established: 1887
- Founder: Rev. William Henry Webb
- Closed: 1974 (became Handcross Park School)

Newells Preparatory School came to Lower Beeding, Sussex, in 1946. It has been at Handcross since 1968 and was known as Handcross Park School since 1974. It merged with Brighton College in 2011. It is now known as Brighton College Prep Handcross.

== History ==
The school was originally known as Wykeham Hall. It was founded in 1887 by Rev. William Henry Webb, at Wykeham Hall, Lee-on-Solent. It was taken over by his son Ernest Webb in 1903 and later moved to nearby Seafield Park. (Note: Wykeham Hall) Seafield Park had been the name of a large Victorian mansion built in 1872 by Sir Henry Sykes on 83 acres of land at Hill Head. It was destroyed by fire in 1948. In 1888 the house and grounds were sold to the Rev.R.W Pain, and in 1890 Seafield Park was registered for scholastic purposes under Mr.Pain and the Rev. Courtney Spencer Foster. In 1903 ownership was transferred to William Hoare and the school was changed to an engineering establishment. In 1907 the property was purchased by W.L. Agnew, and in 1910 the school was converted back to a Boys Preparatory school with W.A.Rix M.A. as headmaster. After Rix had been declared bankrupt, the premises were leased to Ernest Webb who moved his school there from Wykeham Hall. In 1923 ownership was transferred to Ernest's wife, Minnie Louisa Webb. Wykeham Hall was bought by the Fleet Air Arm in 1917 for use as a naval air station, RNAS Lee-on-Solent (HMS Daedalus).

On the outbreak of World War II, when Seafield Park was taken over for the Fleet Air Arm, the school moved to Endsleigh House, Milton Abbott, near Tavistock, Devon. This house had been built in 1810 and had continued in use as the summer holiday home for successive Dukes of Bedford. It had been designed by Sir Jeffry Wyattville as a cottage orne´ for John Russell, 6th Duke of Bedford. On the conclusion of the War the Admiralty retained Seafield Park for naval use and the Duke of Bedford re-possessed his country home. The school was then moved to Newells, Lower Beeding, Nr Horsham, Sussex. (Note: The house at Newells during World War II had been taken over by the Ministry of Defence and was the headquarters for a Canadian Division, prior to the Invasion of Normandy.) Captain Peter Hope-Lang took over from Ernest Webb as Headmaster. The school badge was retained but the name of the school changed from Seafield Park to Newells.

The school remained at Lower Beeding until 1968 when a disastrous fire destroyed most of the buildings. By necessity the school was then amalgamated with Desmoor preparatory school at Handcross Park. More details on the history and people involved at that time, including photo images, can be seen at the Newells school website ( Address/Link shown below) with images of Seafield Park at Endsleigh and Newells Lower Beeding.

The school then became known as Handcross Park School. In 2011 the school became a part of Brighton College.

=== Badge ===
The badge in use when the school was at Seafield Park and Newells, Lower Beeding continued to be used after the school moved and it had been renamed Handcross Park School. It has now adopted the badge of Brighton College

The Newells badge is a device comprising an heraldic style shield of gold on a blue background, over the motto, worded in Middle English, "Be Trewe". In 1939, when faced with the conflict with Germany then under the regime of the Nazi Party whose flag bore some resemblance to the fylfot, the school badge had been varied by putting three Cross potent in place of the three heraldic fylfot crosses which had previously been used. The fylfot, symbolising peace and good will, had been in general use in Asia for thousands of years before, as a government spokesman mentioned in Parliament, "it was hijacked by the Nazi party."

== Newells, the house ==
The house occupied by the school when at Lower Beeding had been built c.1869 as a private residence to the designs of Sir Matthew Digby Wyatt, as mentioned in A History of the County of Sussex: Volume 6. From 1855 until 1859 Matthew Digby Wyatt was honorary secretary of the Royal Institute of British Architects, and in 1866 received the Royal Gold Medal. See also article Wyatt family. Photographic images of the exterior and interior of the house when occupied by the prep. school can be seen at the Newells website. Wyatt's Royal Gold Medal is mentioned in the Oxford DNB.
