= Westbourne Terrace =

Street in Paddington, London

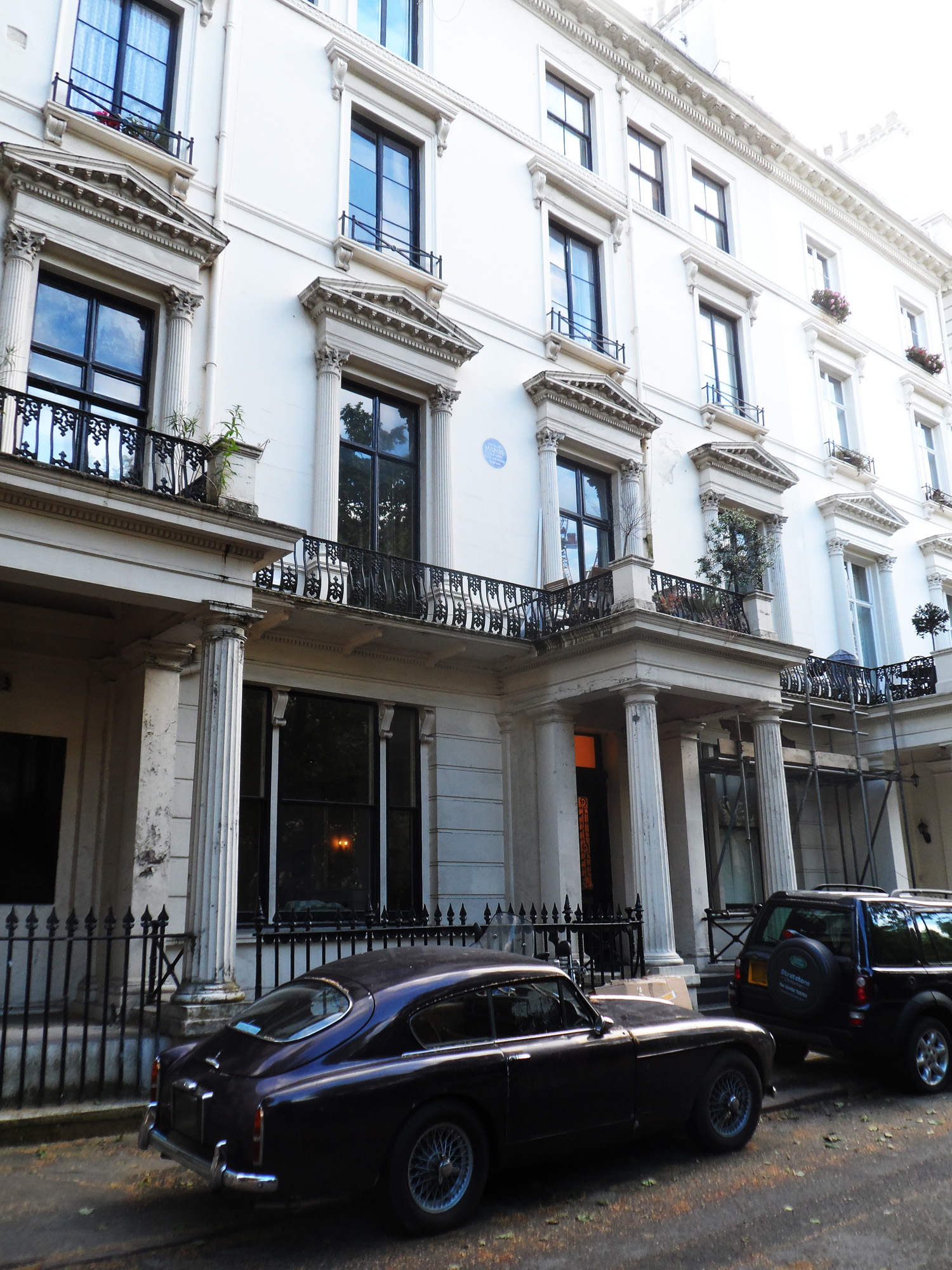
- 60 Westbourne Terrace

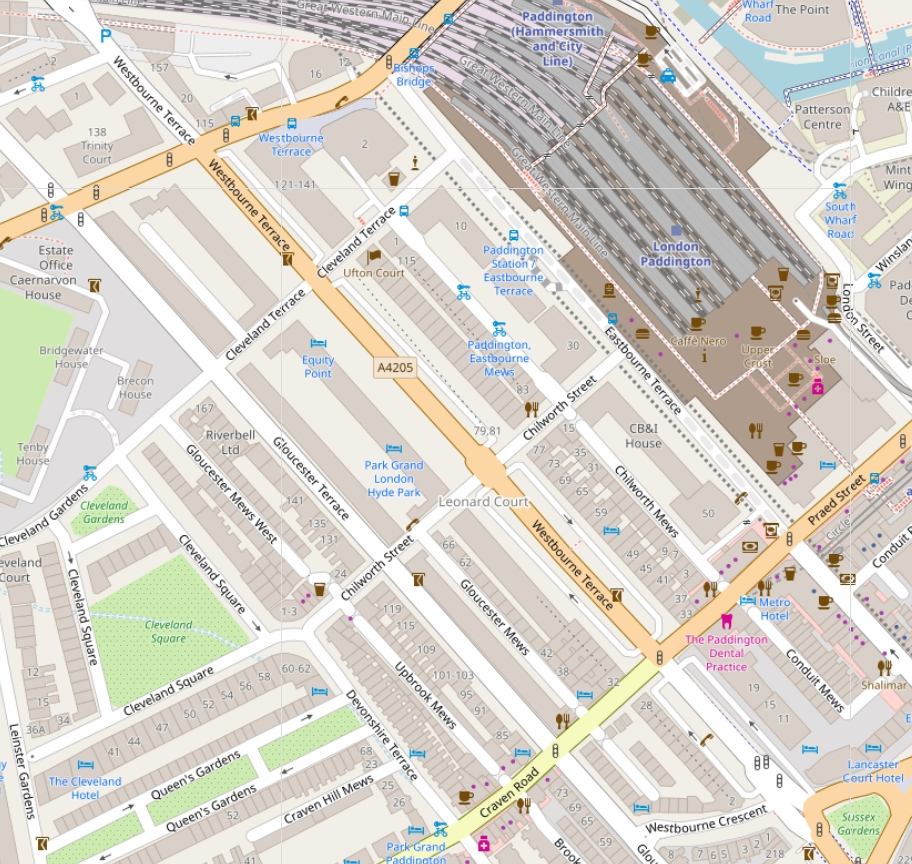
- Westbourne Terrace (centre, diagonal)
- Type: Residential terraced houses
- Area: West London
- Location: Westbourne
- Coordinates: 51.5159°N 0.1797°W

Construction
- Construction start: 1839
- Completion: Late 1850s

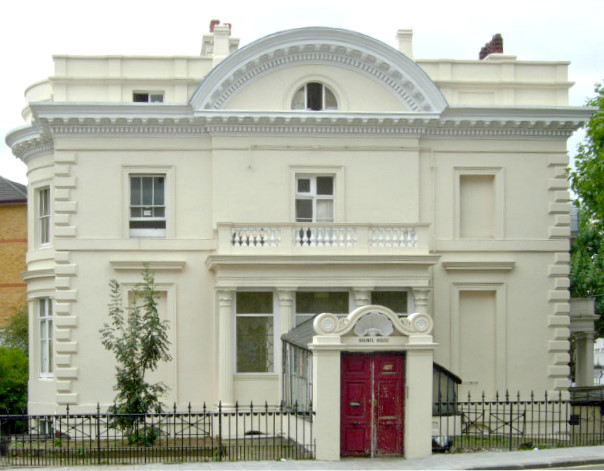
140 Westbourne Terrace by George Ledwell Taylor, 1843–48.

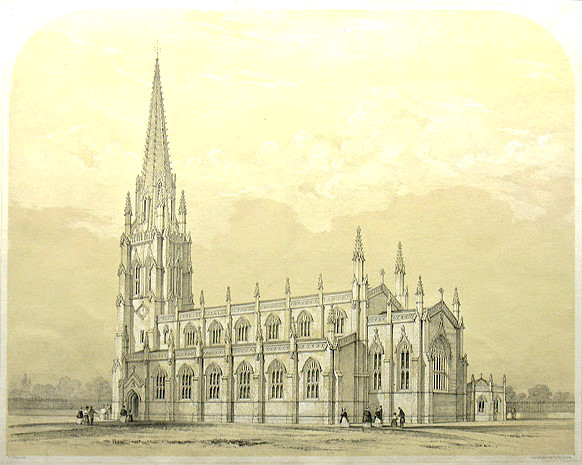
The Church of the Holy Trinity, Bishop's Road, Paddington. Artist: T. Bury. Lithograph, c. 1845.

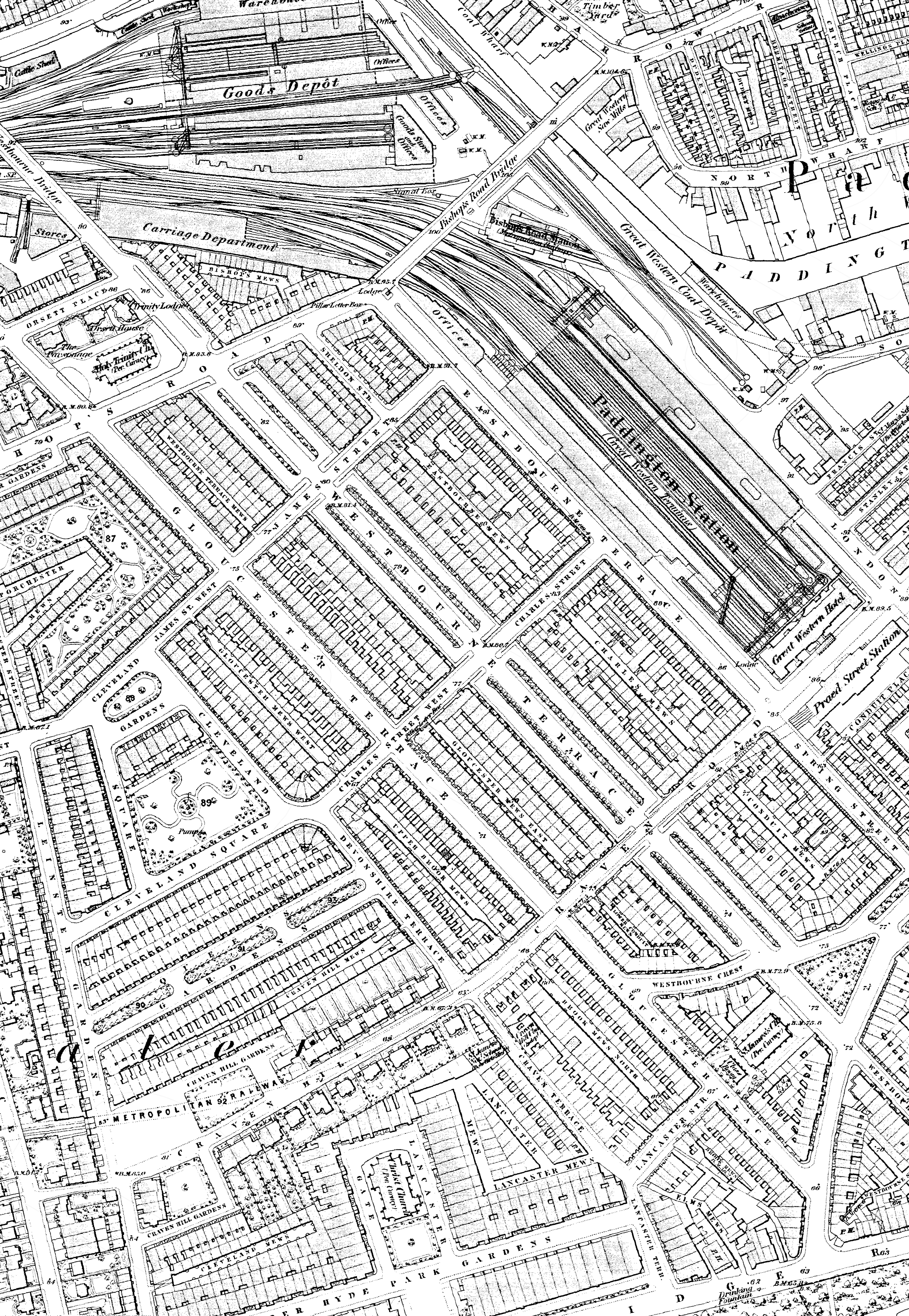
Westbourne Terrace (centre, diagonal) on an 1869 Ordnance Survey map

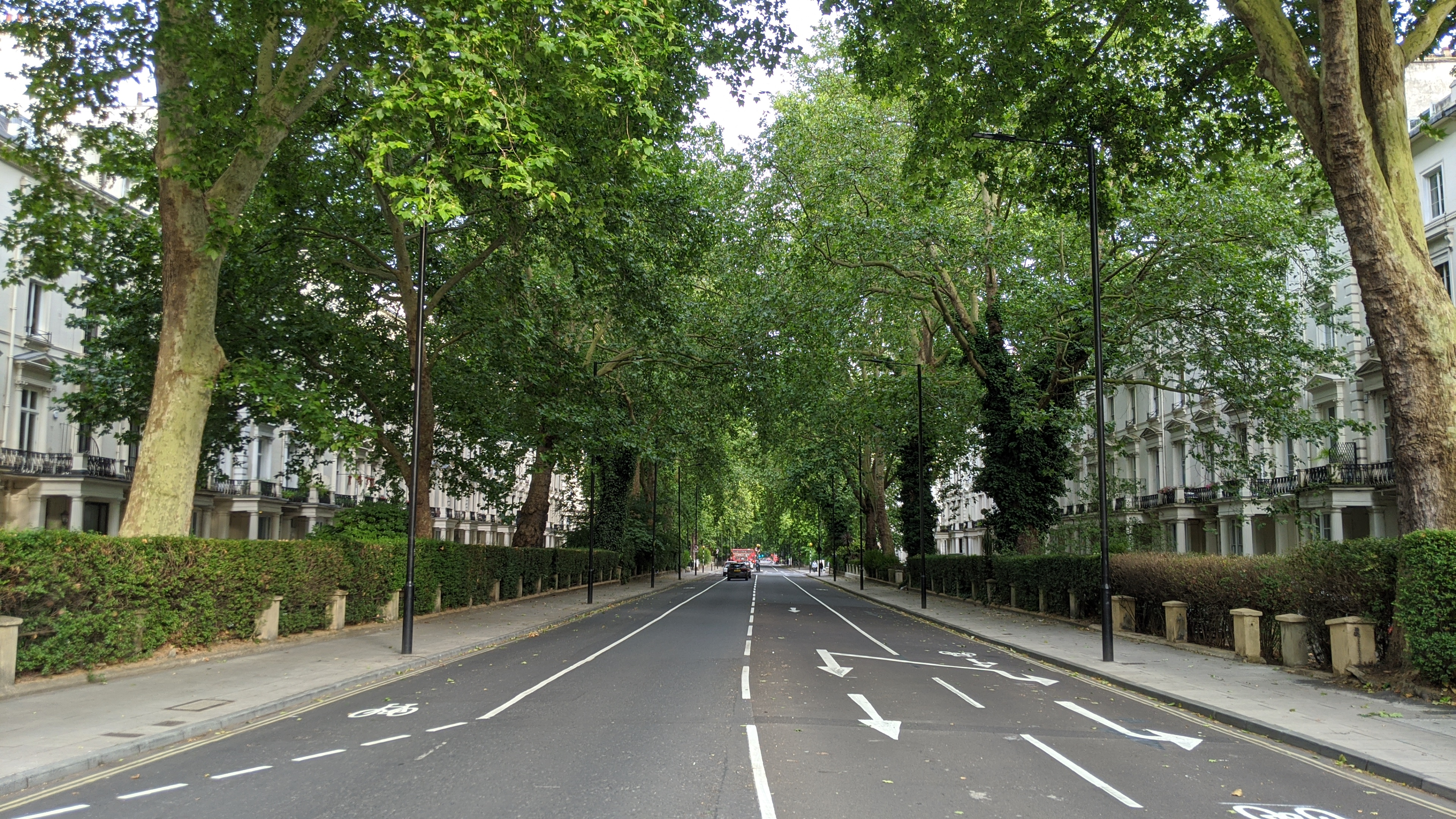
Westbourne Terrace as seen from the intersection with Cleveland Terrace in August

Westbourne Terrace is a street in the Paddington district of the City of Westminster in west London. The street runs between Westbourne Bridge in the north and the junction of Westbourne Crescent and Sussex Gardens in the south and was developed between 1839 and the late 1850s. It has been described as the "most spacious and dignified avenue" in Bayswater and "unrivalled in its class in London or even Great Britain". The street is not to be confused with Westbourne Terrace Road which runs north from Westbourne Bridge into Little Venice, and a large number of other Westbourne streets in the area.

== History ==
Westbourne Terrace is named after the local River Westbourne, a tributary of the River Thames, and is one of a large number of Westbourne streets in the area. In 1868, Cusack Roney wrote in Rambles on Railways, that there were 19 "Westbourne" streets listed in the London Postal Guide.

The street was developed between 1839 and the late 1850s. Architects working in the area included Matthew Wyatt, George Ledwell Taylor, and Thomas Marsh Nelson who was particularly active in Westbourne Terrace in the 1840s on behalf of the builder William Kingdom.

== Buildings ==
Westbourne Terrace is a long tree-lined avenue, almost wholly made up of four storey stucco-fronted terraced houses divided by the cross streets, Bishop's Bridge Road, Cleveland Terrace (formerly James Street), Chilworth Street, and Craven Road. The street has more modern buildings north of Bishop's Bridge Road, including the Enterprise House at numbers 167–169, which is occupied by Network Rail. Westbourne Terrace Mews runs north from Cleveland Terrace but does not join Westbourne Terrace. Each terrace has its own private access road at the front. According to Nikolaus Pevsner, the architecture of Westbourne Terrace shows the transition from the classical style to the Italianate.

Originally occupied by wealthy merchants, admirals, governors, and statesmen, the terrace has been home to many renowned people. The exterior of the great majority of the buildings is still intact, though most houses have been converted into flats, and in some instances, hotels or offices. The original buildings in the terrace are Grade II listed and fall within the Bayswater Conservation Area.

=== East side ===
Numbers 1 to 31 were built by Robert Palmer Browne by 1849. They are Grade II listed. Irish painter Patrick Swift lived at number nine in the mid-twentieth century. Canadian author Elizabeth Smart also lived at number nine, in a different flat. John Constable, eldest son of the painter, resided at number 17, which was the first house to be completed. Roseate House London, a luxury boutique hotel, occupies numbers 3–5.

Numbers 33–77 were developed by William Kingdom, whose architect was Thomas Marsh Nelson. They are Grade II listed. Admiral Charles Bethune lived at number 53. The Chilworth, a boutique hotel, occupies numbers 55–61.

The terrace of 79–119 was built around 1840, probably by William King and William Kingdom. It is Grade II listed. Augustus Prevost, Governor of the Bank of England from 1901 to 1903, lived at number 79, and in 1902 he was made Baronet Prevost of Westbourne Terrace, London in recognition of his services as Governor of the Bank of England during the Boer War. George William Anderson, a colonial governor, lived at number 99 from 1947 till 1957. Joshua Walmsley, an English businessman and Liberal Party politician, lived at number 101. Richard Cobden, an English politician and social reformer best known for his successful fight for repeal of the Corn Laws and his defense of free trade, lived at number 103 from June 1848 to 1856. John Benjamin Smith, an English Liberal Party politician, lived at number 105. Walmsley, Cobden, and Smith were next-door neighbours, living in three adjoining houses at Westbourne Terrace, and hence numbers 101, 103, and 105 Westbourne Terrace came to be known as "Radical Row".

Numbers 121 to 141, later the Dorland Hotel, and now offices of WPP and Ogilvy, is Grade II listed. The terrace was built around 1840, probably by William King and William Kingdom.

Author Aldous Huxley lived at number 155 in 1921–2. Brewer's Court, a residential building, and Enterprise House currently occupy the northern end of Westbourne Terrace between Bishop's Bridge Road and Westbourne Bridge. Enterprise House, located at numbers 167–169, is an irregularly shaped building designed by P A Culverhouse and constructed between 1932 and 1935 close to the former Parcel Depot (Building 3), just south of the tracks, by the Westbourne Bridge. It is concrete framed and of six storeys, with facade towards the road and the tracks in the same restrained Art Deco style that Culverhouse employed on the arrival side offices. The top two floors were a hostel for woman staff, mostly employed in Paddington's refreshment rooms, and Culverhouse provided them with a spacious roof-top terrace. It is currently occupied by Network Rail.

=== West side ===
Numbers 2-30 were developed by William King in the 1840s. Numbers 6–30 are Grade II listed. Art critic R. H. Wilenski was born at number 16 Upper Westbourne Terrace in 1887.

Numbers 32 to 68 were developed by William Kingdom, whose architect was Thomas Marsh Nelson. They are Grade II listed. Susan Lawrence, one of the earliest female Labour MPs, lived at number 44. Civil engineer Charles Manby (1804–1884) lived at number 60 during 1870–77. Uriah Maggs opened his first bookshop at 44 Westbourne Terrace North in 1844. Admiral Baldwin Wake Walker lived at number 66. Field-Marshal Sir William Robertson (1860–1933) lived at number 88 during his retirement.

Numbers 70–106 and 108 to 136 are Grade II listed. They were built around 1840, probably by William King and William Kingdom. Richard Bethell, later Lord Chancellor as Lord Westbury, lived at number 70. Number 124 was the location of the Austrian Centre, which was the most important social, cultural and political hub for Austrian exiles from the Nazis. The architect Thomas Chatfeild-Clarke spent the latter part of his life at number 132. Park Grand London Hyde Park hotel occupies numbers 78–82.

Holy Trinity church once stood on the north-west corner with Bishop's Road, now Bishop's Bridge Road. It was built in 1844–1846 to a design by Thomas Cundy. It was closed in 1971 after being declared unsafe, before being demolished in the 1980s. Trinity Court, a 6-storey block of 54 flats, was built on the site in 1986.

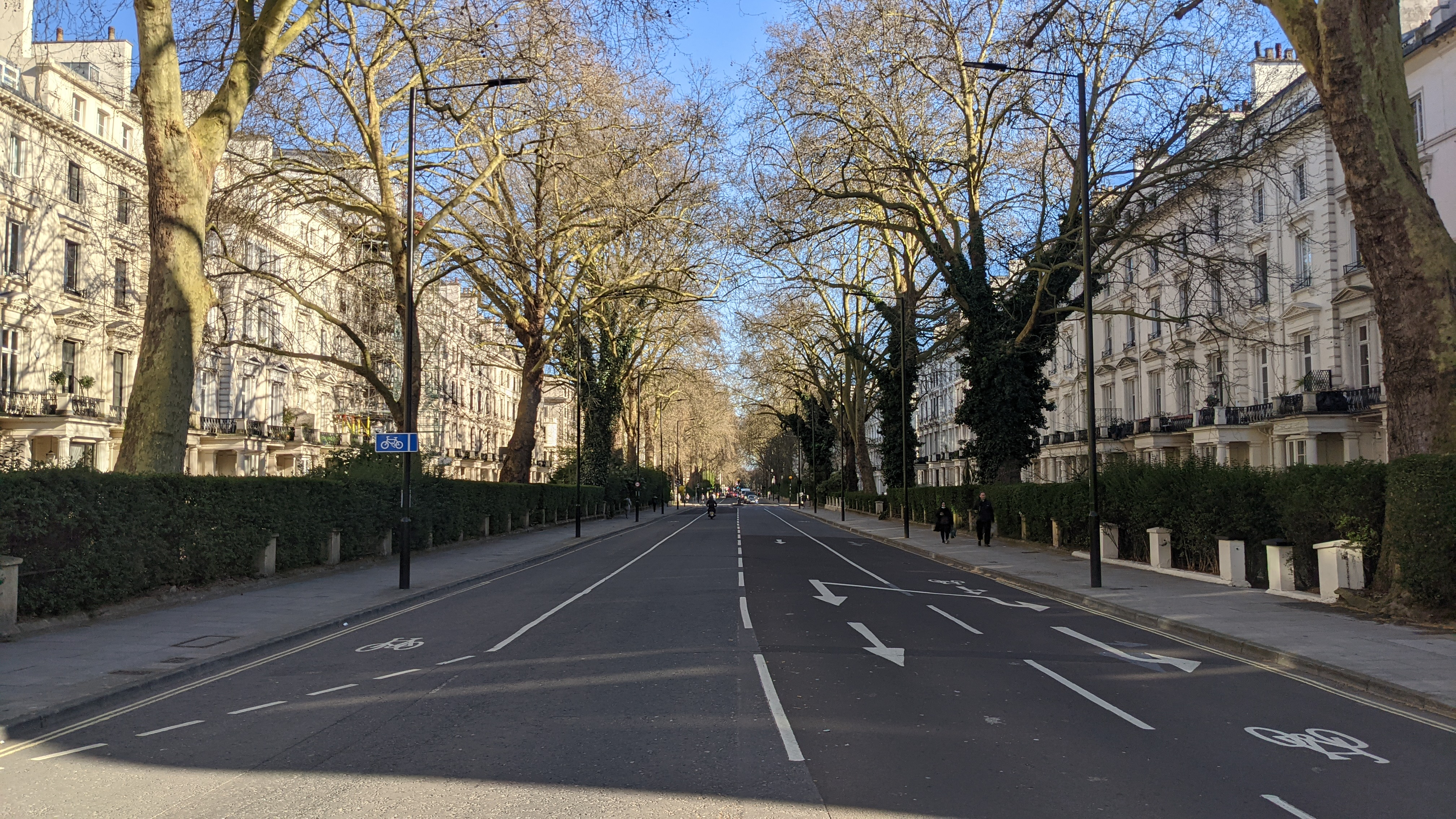
Westbourne Terrace as seen from the intersection with Cleveland Terrace in late March

Brunel House, originally Trinity Lodge, an Italiante stucco villa at number 140 on the southern corner with Orsett Terrace is Grade II listed. It was designed by George Ledwell Taylor in 1843–1848. Architect George Ledwell Taylor designed and lived briefly at no. 140 in 1852–3.

Westbourne Court is an eight-storey block of flats, dating from 1938, and it is located on the northern corner with Orsett Terrace at the north end of Westbourne Terrace. It is typical of its period and is in red brick and stucco, with Crittall windows.

== See also ==
- Augustus Prevost, Baronet Prevost of Westbourne Terrace
