= Under the Westway =

Single by Blur
- A-side: "The Puritan"
- Released: 2 July 2012
- Recorded: March 2012
- Genre: Chamber pop; alternative rock
- Length: 4:16
- Label: Parlophone
- Songwriter: Blur
- Producer: Blur

Blur singles chronology
"Fool's Day" (2010)	"Under the Westway" / "The Puritan" (2012)	"Go Out" (2015)

Music video
- "Under the Westway" on YouTube

"Under the Westway" is a single by English rock band Blur, released on 2 July 2012. After being played by Damon Albarn and Graham Coxon at Brixton Academy as part of a charity performance for War Child, speculation rose as to "Under the Westway"'s release. On 25 June 2012, it was announced on the band's Twitter account that the song, accompanied with the band's other new single "The Puritan", would be performed live by the band via a live stream from a secret location (which proved to be the rooftop of their 13 studio in West London), and released for download shortly after, with Albarn stating "I wrote these songs for [the upcoming Hyde Park show] and I’m really excited about getting out there and playing them for people." The single was released as a download-only release on 2 July 2012, accompanied by "The Puritan", and received a physical release in August. The song also made its radio debut on Steve Lamacq's BBC Radio 6 Music show on the same day. It was the band's first single since 2010's "Fool's Day". An early version of the song is included on the Blur 21 box set.

The performances of "The Puritan" and "Under the Westway" on 2 July 2012 were the first live performances of new material by the whole band since 30 January 1999, when all four members played a fan-club only concert at the Arts Depot in London, at the start of their 13 tour.

"Under the Westway" debuted at number 34 on the UK Singles Chart on download sales alone, and remains their most recent UK Top 40 hit. Discounting limited releases which did not chart, "Under the Westway" was Blur's lowest peak placement since their debut single, "She's So High". The low positioning was likely aided by a lack of significant publicity and corresponding album release. "Under the Westway" also reached number 54 on the Irish Singles Chart and number 120 on the French Charts.

== Background ==
The Westway, part of the A40, is a major road in west London which is elevated on concrete structures over the surrounding streets. It was also referenced in the lyrics of Blur's 1993 single "For Tomorrow", and in their 2010 single "Fool's Day".

Upon hearing the song, the public and critics suggested influences ranging from The Beatles' "Hey Jude" to David Bowie. Bass player Alex James told the BBC afterwards it was "a classic Blur ballad" and "a stand still and cry your eyes out sort of job".

== Reception ==
Priya Elan of NME wrote that "Albarn's acting school/musicals influence shows itself on 'Under The Westway'. Unbothered by any pan-global musical influences, or snarky cartoon characters making an appearance, this is a mournful piano ballad. We find Damon plodding away, in the style of his hero Ray Davies, or Rufus Wainwright." "The man who has, throughout his lyric writing career, sneered at technological progress, longs for a simpler time. "Give us the day, they switch off the machines," he pleads. Still, there's a sense that whilst not quite an 'Olympic spirit', Damon has found his London lover once again. "It was bright day in my city today," he sings proudly before mentioning that he was, "watching comets" from his smoggy locale." The review went on to claim the track was "one of the finest songs they've ever written, and certainly one of the saddest." "Under the Westway" placed third in NME's 'Best Tracks of 2012', while Pitchfork named it at number 99 on their 'Top 100 Tracks of 2012' list.

== Track listing ==
All tracks are written by Blur.

7", download
No.	Title	Length
1.	"Under the Westway"	4:16
2.	"The Puritan"	3:25

CD
No.	Title	Length
1.	"Under the Westway"	4:16
2.	"Under the Westway" (acoustic)	4:04
3.	"Under the Westway" (instrumental)	4:17
4.	"The Puritan"	3:25
5.	"The Puritan" (instrumental)	3:26
Total length:		19:26

== Personnel ==
- Damon Albarn – lead vocals, piano
- Graham Coxon – guitar, backing vocals
- Alex James – bass guitar
- Mike Smith – xylophone
- Dave Rowntree – drums

== Charts ==
Chart (2012)	Peak position
Belgium (Ultratip Bubbling Under Flanders)	10
France (SNEP)	120
Ireland (IRMA)	54
Japan Hot 100 (Billboard)	59
Mexico (Mexico Ingles Airplay)	41
UK Singles (Official Charts)	34
