= Warwick Crescent =

Street in Little Venice, London

Coordinates: 51.520853°N 0.182364°W

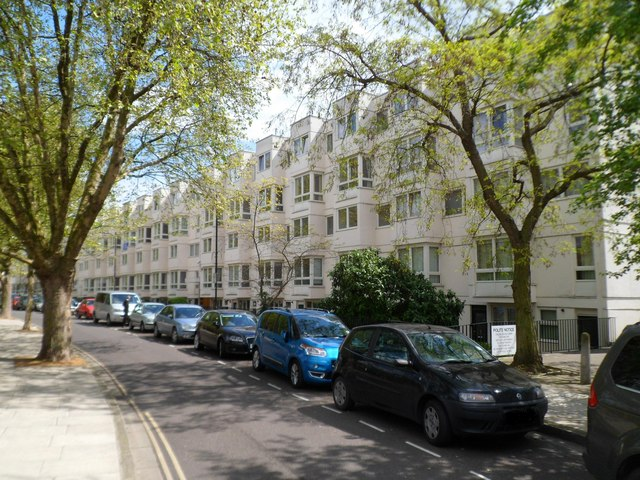
Modern apartments on Warwick Crescent

Warwick Crescent is a street in Little Venice, London. It connects Harrow Road with Westbourne Terrace Road, running along the southern edge of the Grand Union Canal.

The street began to be built up around 1852 when William Buddle purchased 12 plots of land for development. The poet Robert Browning lived at No. 19 between 1861 and 1887, where he wrote The Ring and the Book. Beauchamp Lodge at No. 2 Warwick Crescent was used as a hostel for musicians for many years. Katherine Mansfield stayed at the Lodge in 1908.

At the turn of the 20th century, the area around the street went into gradual decline and suffered overcrowding. By the 1950s it had become one of the worst slums in London. In 1966, the street was cleared of properties by the Greater London Council and rebuilt.
