= William Kingdom =

19th-century British people (1840–50)

William Kingdom (fl. 1840s-50s) was a property developer who was active in the development of tracts of west London in the mid-nineteenth century. These included the Westbourne area where he worked with Thomas Marsh Nelson on Westbourne Terrace, areas north of Craven Road, and most of Gloucester Terrace between 1843 and 1852. He may also have developed Hyde Park Gardens, Paddington.
