= R. H. Wilenski =

English painter, art historian and critic

- R. H. Wilenski by John L. Pemberton.
- Born: Reginald Howard Wilenski; 7 March 1887; Paddington, London, England
- Died: 19 April 1975 (aged 88); Marlow, Buckinghamshire, England
- Education: University of Oxford
- Occupations: Painter, art historian, art critic
- Spouse: Marjorie Isold Harland (m.1914)

Reginald Howard Wilenski (7 March 1887 – 19 April 1975) was an English painter, art historian and critic known for his books The Modern Movement in Art (1927), The Meaning of Modern Sculpture (1932), and his psychological study of John Ruskin (1933).

He abandoned his studies at Oxford to study painting in Munich and Paris but was unsuccessful in his career as an artist and subsequently worked in the War Office intelligence department during the First World War before reviewing art for the Evening Standard. Later, he lectured in art, first at the University of Bristol and then at the University of Manchester.

He was a press censor and worked for the BBC European service during the Second World War. He was made a chevalier of the Légion d'honneur in 1967.

== Early life and family ==
Reginald Wilenski was born at 16 Upper Westbourne Terrace in Paddington, London on 7 March 1887 to Abraham Arthur Wilenski, a merchant, and his wife Alice (née Simeon). He was educated at St Paul's School, London, and then at Balliol College, University of Oxford, where he read classics. He left after one year to study painting in Munich and Paris and returned to London in 1909.

In August 1914 he married Marjorie Isold Harland (1889–1965) at Kensington, the daughter of Robert Wilson Harland, civil engineer.

== Career ==
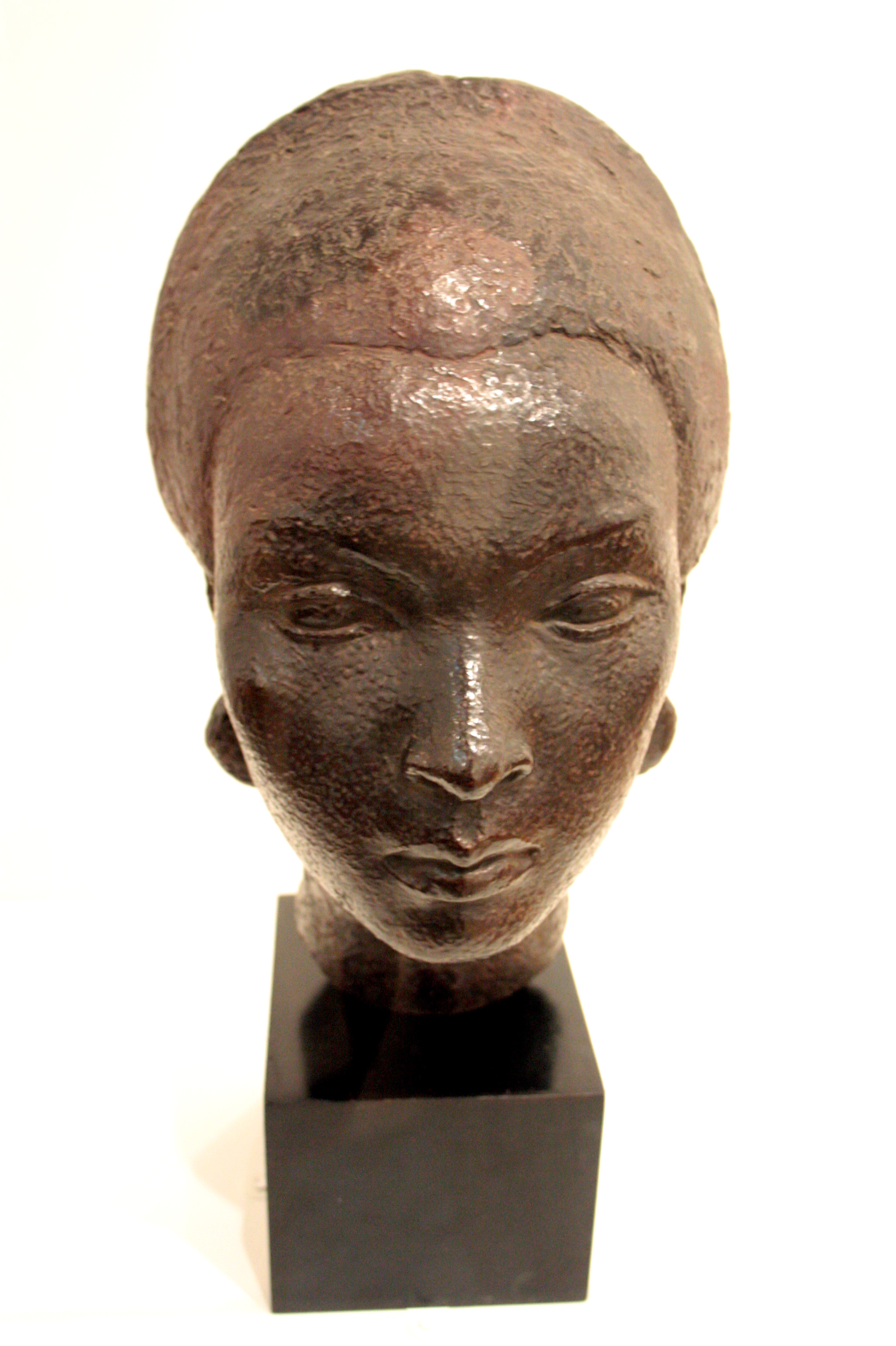
Guadaloupe Head. Dora Gordine, 1928. Tate Modern, London.

Despite exhibiting at the International Society, the Royal Society of Portrait Painters, and the Salon d'Automne in Paris, Wilenski was not successful as a painter. He worked in the War Office intelligence department during the First World War and afterwards at art criticism and in writing exhibition reviews for the Evening Standard from 1923 to 1926. In 1928 he wrote a piece for the paper about Dora Gordine (1895–1991) titled "Girl Sculptor Genius". He bought four "ethnic portrait" busts from her, Mongolian Head, Guadeloupe Head, Semitic Head, and Belgian Head, between 1928 and 1935.

He was appointed special lecturer in art at the University of Bristol for 1929–30, and was special lecturer in the history of art at the University of Manchester from 1933 to 1945 from where he also received an honorary degree of Master of Arts in 1938.

During the Second World War he worked as a press censor from 1939 to 1941 and for the BBC European service from 1941 to 1944. He produced a watercolour portrait of the poet T. S. Eliot in 1946.

== Writing ==
Wilenski was a prolific author. His major work was The Modern Movement in Art (1927) which he dedicated to Geoffrey Faber who had encouraged him to write it. All his books were aimed at the educated layman and showed his journalistic ability to convey his meaning using catchy phrases, periodisation, and easily understood language. For Wilenski, the purpose of studying the history of art was to enable contemporary art to be understood and in The Meaning of Modern Sculpture (1932), he rejected the idea that the Greeks had already achieved perfection in sculpture and discussed ancient sculpture by reference to its social function rather than its aesthetic value, which he questioned. His views were described by Peter Stewart of the University of Oxford as "remarkable" and "damn[ing] the art of the ancients by taking it out of the hands of the connoisseurs and dilettante".

In 1933 he produced John Ruskin: An Introduction to Further Study of his Life and Work in which he attempted a psychological interpretation of Ruskin's life and work, arguing that he was a manic-depressive and mentally unwell from his early years, but acknowledging that he (Wilenski) had no qualifications in the field of mental health.

== Later life ==
Wilenski was made a chevalier of the Légion d'honneur in 1967.

He moved to Marlow in Buckinghamshire in about 1956 and lived at Maldah, 21 Institute Road until his death. He died of bronchopneumonia at Marlow Cottage Hospital on 19 April 1975. His remains were cremated.

== Selected publications ==
Works by R. H. Wilenski include:

=== 1920s ===
- Stanley Spencer. Ernest Benn, London, 1924. (As R.H.W.) (Contemporary British Artists series)
- The Modern Movement in Art. Faber & Gwyer, London, 1927.
- An Introduction to Dutch Art. Faber & Gwyer, London, 1929.
- Italian Painting. T. C. & E. C. Jack, London & Edinburgh, 1929. (With Paul George Konody)

=== 1930s ===
- A Miniature History of European Art. Oxford University Press, 1930.
- French Painting. Medici Society, London, 1931.
- An Outline of French Painting. Faber & Faber, London, 1932.
- The Meaning of Modern Sculpture. Faber & Faber, London, 1932.
- English Painting. Faber & Faber, London, 1933.
- John Ruskin: An Introduction to Further Study of his Life and Work. Faber, London, 1933.
- The Study of Art. Faber & Faber, London, 1934.

=== 1940s and later ===
- Modern French Painters. Faber & Faber, London, 1940.
- An Outline of English Painting. Faber & Faber, London, 1947.
- Flemish Painters, 1430–1830. Faber & Faber, London, 1960. (2 vols.)
