= Thomas Marsh Nelson =

English architect

- Born: c. 1817; London
- Died: 24 February 1884; West Kensington, London
- Occupation: Architect
- Buildings: Warehouse at York Way, Kings Cross
- Projects: Houses at Westbourne Terrace

Thomas Marsh Nelson (c. 1817 - 24 February 1884) was an English architect who worked principally in London. He was particularly active in the development of Westbourne Terrace in the 1840s on behalf of the builder William Kingdom.

== Early life and family ==
Thomas Marsh Nelson was born around 1817 in London. His family were involved in slavery in the West Indies. He married Julia Satara Briggs, daughter of General John Briggs and Jane Dodson, on 10 November 1852 at St. George Hanover Square, London.

== Career ==
In 1838 he gave evidence before the Select Committee of the House of Commons on Metropolis Improvements in relation to the need for new streets in the centre of London to improve traffic flow. In 1841 he was living or working from 3 Charles Street, St James, London. He was in partnership with Charles Innes.

== Later life ==
Nelson was made bankrupt in 1881 when he was living at 6 Comeragh Road, Baron's Court Road, West Kensington. He died on 24 February 1884 at West Kensington, London.

== Works ==
- He was appointed by the Victoria Building Company in Great Yarmouth in the 1840s.
- St John the Evangelist, Clapham, 1840-42: Grade II listed church, built in a classical style as a chapel of ease
- He was active in Westbourne Terrace in the 1840s on behalf of the builder William Kingdom.
- In 1873 he designed the grade II listed warehouse at 34B York Way, Kings Cross, with William Harvey.
