= The Puritan (song) =

Single by Blur
- A-side: "Under the Westway"
- Released: 2 July 2012
- Genre: Post-Britpop, electronic rock
- Length: 3:25
- Label: Parlophone
- Songwriter(s): Blur
- Producer(s): Blur

Blur singles chronology
"Fool's Day" (2010)	"Under the Westway" / "The Puritan" (2012)	"Go Out" (2015)

Music video
- "The Puritan" (live) on YouTube

"The Puritan" is a single by English rock band Blur, released on 2 July 2012. After being played by Damon Albarn at a poetry festival, speculation rose as to "The Puritan"'s release. It is the band's first single since 2010's "Fool's Day". On 25 June 2012, it was announced on the band's Twitter account that the song, accompanied with the band's other new single "Under the Westway", would be performed live by the band via a live stream from a secret location (which proved to be the rooftop of their 13 studio in West London).

The performances of "The Puritan" and "Under the Westway" on 2 July 2012 were the first live performances of new material by the whole band since 30 January 1999, when all four members played a fan-club only concert at the Arts Depot in London, at the start of their 13 tour.

== Reception ==
Matthew Horton of the NME wrote that the song was "initially jarring, with beats pulled straight out of a cracker, it soon unveils a "happy sad" – just one of many meta-lyrics – melody and the kind of ludicrous clowning bounce that Blur have always managed alongside the more world-weary stuff." Horton also stated that the song "pulls together the greatest titbits from the Blur catalogue, and finds room for traces of Gorillaz and all the other malarkey Damon Albarn's turned his magpie mind to. So it's bumped along by the kind of plastic electronic parp you could snap up on Freecycle, echoing Gorillaz' "Doncamatic" in its cheap-as-chips bop, and wigging out to a 'chorus' of frenzied fuzz-bass that'd slot nicely into the more annoying nooks of Think Tank."

== Track listing ==
All tracks are written by Blur.

7", download
No.	Title	Length
1.	"Under the Westway"	4:16
2.	"The Puritan"	3:25

CD
No.	Title	Length
1.	"Under the Westway"	4:16
2.	"Under the Westway" (acoustic)	4:04
3.	"Under the Westway" (instrumental)	4:17
4.	"The Puritan"	3:25
5.	"The Puritan" (instrumental)	3:26
Total length:		19:26

== Personnel ==
- Damon Albarn – lead vocals, synthesizers, acoustic guitar
- Graham Coxon – electric guitar, backing vocals
- Alex James – bass guitar
- Dave Rowntree – drums

== Charts ==
Chart (2012)	Peak position
France (SNEP)	165
Ireland (IRMA)	67
