= Edgar Chatfeild-Clarke =

English politician (1863–1925)

Sir Edgar Chatfeild-Clarke (17 February 1863 – 16 April 1925) was an English Liberal Party politician.

== Family and education ==
Edgar Chatfeild-Clarke was the son of Thomas Chatfeild-Clarke, who was a Fellow of both the Royal Institute of British Architects and of the Royal Institution of Chartered Surveyors, and his wife Ellen (née Nettlefold) from Birmingham. Thomas Chatfeild-Clarke was the Liberal candidate for Poole in Dorset and later for Hammersmith, which he contested unsuccessfully at the 1885 general election. He was also a member of the London School Board and was closely connected to Liberal political causes such as The Society for the Liberation of Religion from State Patronage and Control and franchise reform. He was connected with the Unitarians, as was his wife's family, and built the 1886 headquarters for the denomination on the site of the original Essex Street Chapel.

Edgar Chatfeild-Clarke was educated at King's College School and privately in Dresden in the German state of Saxony. He was a cousin of Joseph Chamberlain. He never married.

== Career ==
Chatfeild-Clarke seems to have been a man with a private income, presumably derived from his father's success as an architect, surveyor and estate agent and his father's directorships of companies, investments or shareholdings. The family also owned land and property in the Isle of Wight. Edgar does not appear to have engaged in any trade or profession in addition to his public and political career. His elder brother, Howard Chatfeild-Clarke (1860–1917), was an architect and surveyor like his father and was in partnership with his father in the firm of T Chatfeild-Clarke & Son but Edgar does not seem to have been associated with the company. He did however introduce a Private Members' Bill into the House of Commons on behalf of the Surveyors' Institution, for the registration of the profession and to protect the public from employing unqualified personnel as surveyors, land agents or auctioneers. However the Bill failed to pass as Chatfeild-Clarke did not achieve a sufficiently high placing in the Private Members' Ballot but the seed of future regulation of the profession had been sown.

== Politics ==
=== Local politics ===
Chatfeild-Clarke did however inherit his father's political inclinations. He was first elected to the Isle of Wight County Council in 1900 and remained a member up until the time of his death in 1925. He also served as a justice of the peace, a member of the Isle of Wight Education Committee and as a member of the IoW Advisory Committee re the appointment of magistrates. He was an officer of the Island Liberal Federation, being its president in 1920.

=== Parliament ===
==== 1922 ====
Chatfeild-Clarke stood for Parliament on one occasion only, at the 1922 general election in the Isle of Wight constituency. The seat had been represented by the Conservatives since January 1910 but it had elected Liberals in 1880 and 1906. In 1904, John Seely who had been elected as a Conservative in 1900 defected to the Liberals, so there was some radical tradition for Liberals to exploit there in 1922. Although there was a Labour candidate standing in 1922, dividing the progressive vote, he lost his deposit gaining 11.2% of the poll. The Conservative vote was also badly split by the intervention of an Independent Conservative candidate, who took 21% of the poll. This allowed Chatfeild-Clarke to top the poll with a majority of 1,582 votes.

==== 1923 ====
Chatfeild-Clarke decided that he did not wish to stand again for Parliament again. He cited poor health as his reason for standing down but there was speculation that he was standing aside to make way for the former MP, Jack Seely, to get back into the House of Commons. Seely held the seat in 1923 – but only just, securing a majority of 90 votes or 0.3% of the total number of votes cast. Labour again lost their deposit.

== Other honours and appointments ==
Chatfeild-Clarke was knighted in 1913 and was appointed a deputy governor of the Isle of Wight in 1920.

== Death ==
Chatfeild-Clarke died on 16 April 1925 of influenza at his home in Wooton on the Isle of Wight, at the age of 62.

Parliament of the United Kingdom
| Preceded by Douglas Bernard Hall | Member of Parliament for the Isle of Wight; 1922 – 1923 | Succeeded by John Seely |
