= Handcross Hill bus crash =

1906 bus crash in England

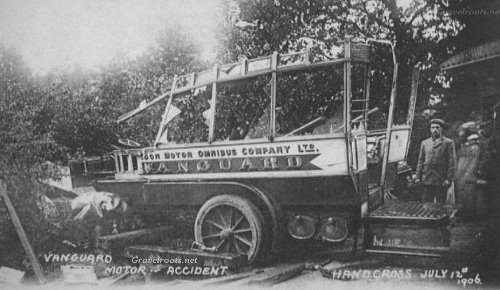
- A 1906 postcard showing the wrecked bus

Details
- Date: 12 July 1906
- Location: Handcross Hill, Sussex
- Coordinates: 51.05356°N 0.20044°W
- Country: United Kingdom
- Incident type: Bus accident
- Cause: Gearbox and brake failure

Statistics
- Vehicles: 1
- Passengers: 34
- Crew: 2
- Deaths: 10
- Injured: 26

On 12 July 1906, a bus crashed into a tree on Handcross Hill in Sussex, England, killing 10 people and injuring a further 26 in the worst road crash in Sussex history.

== Background ==
The vehicle involved in the crash was described as the "Vanguard" motor omnibus No. 6,064, meaning it was a London bus from the London Motor Omnibus Company. The driver was H. Blakeman and the conductor was F. Ewens. Including the two crew members, there were 36 people on the bus. The bus was hired for a private excursion to Brighton for the day, carrying Volunteer Fire Brigade members and their families from Orpington and St Mary Cray in Kent.

== Accident ==
A report from The Times newspaper released on the day after the crash published a detailed account of what happened on the day. The bus reportedly reached Handcross Hill a few minutes before 11 a.m., and as it went down the hill it began to gather speed. As the driver applied the brakes, the gearbox shattered, and the brakes subsequently failed, causing the vehicle to sway from side to side of the road. About 100 yards from where the brakes broke, the bus crashed into a large tree on the hillside. The deckload of passengers was reportedly hurled into the woods, and the body of the bus rebounded onto the road and drove into the bank again a little further down the hill. The bus laid completely wrecked in two heaps of debris.

A cyclist which the bus had passed saw the bus disappear into a cloud of dust, and when he looked down the hill he saw bodies of the dead and injured lying in the roadway, and the wreck of the bus pinned between two trees. He immediately called for assistance, first informing the occupants of a trap (carriage). The injured were initially transported to the very near village of Handcross, where the Red Lion Inn was used as a temporary hospital. Aid from nearby towns soon arrived, with the Crawley and Ifield hospitals sending doctors and nurses and the Sussex County Hospital in Brighton sending nursing staff in a motor-car.

A total of 10 people died: six were killed immediately; one died whilst being moved to Handcross; and three died at Handcross. It is the deadliest road crash in Sussex history.
