= Brighton College Prep Handcross =

School in Handcross, West Sussex, England

Location
- London Road; Handcross, West Sussex, RH17 6HF; England; 51°3′43.61″N 0°11′48.36″W

Information
- Type: Private preparatory
- Motto: Be Trewe
- Religious affiliation: Anglican
- Established: 1887
- Founder: Rev. William Henry Webb
- Head Master: Jonnie Besley
- Staff: A. Costello (Pastoral Deputy Head); E. Johnson (Deputy Head) R. Clark (Academic)
- Gender: Coeducational
- Age: 2 to 13
- Houses: Normans, Britons, Saxons, Vikings
- Colours: Blue & gold
- Website: www.brightoncollegeprephandcross.co.uk

Brighton College Prep Handcross (formerly Handcross Park School) is an independent co-educational preparatory school in Handcross, between Crawley, Horsham and Haywards Heath in West Sussex, England. The school provides private co-education from the Nursery aged 2, through Pre-Prep and into Prep until aged 13, with a mix of day pupils flexi, weekly and full boarders.

== History ==
The school traces its origins back to 1887, when it was known as Wykeham Hall, based in Hampshire. In 1918 Wykeham Hall was bought by the Fleet Air Arm who used it as part of their Officers' Mess, and the School move to the opposite side of the airfield into Seafield Park and moved the school to Lower Beeding a town near Horsham changing the name to Newells.

In 1968 following a major fire where one pupil died, the school relocated to Handcross and merged with Desmoor School from Ewhurst in Surrey. In 1974 the school changed its name to 'Handcross Park'.

Originally there were two headmasters, Captain Peter Hope-Lang and Mr Alan McNeile, until Hope-Lang's death in 1970. For a time the school was also known as Newells and Desmoor School.

In 2011 Handcross Park joined a 'family of schools' with Brighton College and St Christophers.

As of 2019, the School has 414 pupils. The Headmaster, Jonnie Besley, joined the school in 2023, taking over from Richard Brown, who became Head in 2016. A former headmaster, Graeme Owton has become Executive Head of the Brighton College Prep Schools.

In January 2025 it was announced that the school would merge with Brighton College to become Brighton College Prep Handcross from 2025

== Badge ==
The school continues use of the badge that was in use when the school was at Newells, Lower Beeding, and before then, at Seafield Park, Lee-on-Solent. It is a device comprising an heraldic style shield of gold on a blue background, over the motto, worded in Middle English, "Be Trewe".

== Grounds and Facilities ==
The School is based in 52 Acres of parkland in rural West Sussex.

The school is a leading institution in Educational Resources such as interactive smartboards, and Google Chromebooks.

There is also an Art & Design Center, that includes a Gallery, Kiln, and Pottery Wheel.

For sport there is an all-weather pitch that accommodates Football, Hockey, Cricket, and PE. A large sports hall used for theater productions, an on-grass Athletics Track, a 6-Hole Golf course and multiple Tennis courts, The school also has an indoor swimming pool.

== Further Education ==
With 35% of Alumni graduating to Brighton College the remaining latter move on to other schools including:

- Ardingly College
- Charterhouse
- Eton College
- Harrow School
- Hurst College
- Lancing College
- Marlborough College
- Repton School
- Rugby School
- Shrewsbury School
- Wellington School
- Winchester School

== Governors ==
As of February 2024:

- Chair of Governors - Miles Templeman
- Safeguarding Governor - Adrian Ford
- EYFS Governor - Wendy Challen
- Finance Governor - Emma Dobson MA
- Boarding Governor - Jane Hamblett-Jahn
- Staff Governor - Shirley Harris BEd HONS
- Education and Compliance - Jo-Anne Riley MA
- Health and Safety Governor - Rishi Soni BSc, ACA, FCA
- Governor - Lady Serena Soames MA Oxon, Wife of Lord Nicholas Soames
