= Westbourne Bridge =

Bridge in London, United Kingdom

Coordinates: 51.5188°N 0.183°W

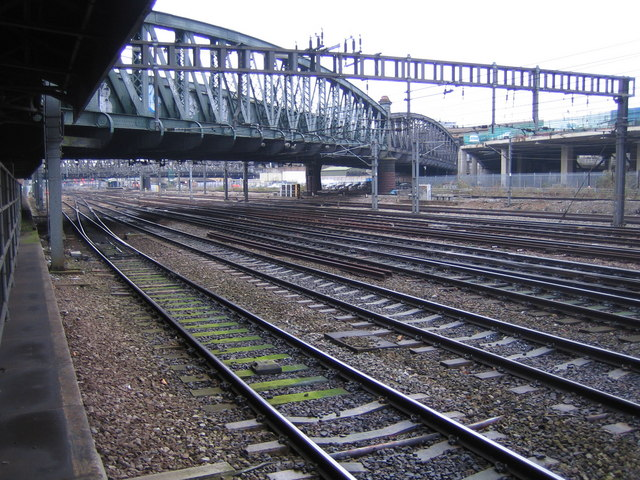
Westbourne Bridge

Westbourne Bridge is a grade II listed road bridge in the City of Westminster, London. It was built some time after 1909 for the Great Western Railway.

It carries road traffic over the railway lines in and out of Paddington Station and is joined at its northern end by Westbourne Terrace Road and at the south end by Westbourne Terrace. However, northbound road traffic has not been able to travel between the bridge and Westbourne Terrace Road since 1970. Northbound traffic has been diverted on to Harrow Road running under the elevated roadway of the Westway for a short distance. Southbound traffic using the bridge comes from the eastbound sliproad descending from the Westway.
