= Reynolds Brothers =

New Jersey department store

Reynolds Brothers, Inc.
- Store sign c. 1996
- Company type: Private
- Industry: Retail
- Founded: 1899; 127 years ago
- Founder: George F. Reynolds
- Headquarters: Lakewood, New Jersey, U.S.
- Number of locations: 30 (peak)
- Area served: New Jersey
- Products: Clothing and accessories
- Number of employees: ~400 (peak)

Reynolds Brothers, also known as Reynolds, is a department store chain in New Jersey. It was founded in 1899 and operated a single location for over 60 years before starting expansion into a regional New Jersey chain of family apparel and accessory stores. The store was founded by George F. Reynolds and was later run by his son and grandson. An off-price brand of women's clothing stores, the Rafters brand, was added in the late 1970s. The company had grown to 22 stores in 1996 when it was sold to a private investor group. It peaked at about 30 stores a few years later before having financial difficulties. It downsized through bankruptcy reorganization in 2004 and reemerged with just three stores.

== Founding ==
The store was founded in 1899 by George F. Reynolds and Walter Hansen and was originally called Reynolds & Hansen. The first store was in Asbury Park, New Jersey. Reynolds bought out Hansen (Note: Hansen later partnered in the company Sharp & Hansen.) and brought in his brother John as a new partner. After changing the name to Reynolds Bros., Reynolds bought out his brother but kept the same name. It started as a dry goods and home furnishings' retailer before evolving into a department/clothing store and later only men's, women's and children's fashions. Reynolds instituted a policy of "always being honest with the customer".

The store relocated to Perth Amboy where it operated as the only location for many decades. The store received electric lighting in 1909. After a 1930 remodeling, it was reported to be "one of the most modern in New Jersey". The store was reopened after suffering extensive smoke and water damage from a fire that destroyed several adjoining buildings in January 1951.

The company incorporated in 1923, with its longest-term employees becoming board members. Other employees with five years of service received five shares of company stock worth $500, and those with more than ten years received ten shares.

== Reynolds leadership ==
Founder George F. Reynolds became company chairman upon incorporation and retained the position until his 100th birthday in April 1965. The birthday and retirement was celebrated with an open house at the Perth Amboy store which Reynolds attended. Reynolds died on January 16, 1967, at age 101.

Reynold's son, Charles H. Reynolds, a graduate of Georgetown University, joined the company in 1926. In 1955, he was secretary-treasurer of the corporation and later took over from his father. He died in 1987.

Charles H. Reynolds Jr., the founder's grandson joined the firm in 1954 and was the executive vice-president and general merchandising manager in 1964. He was a graduate of Cornell University and the Harvard Business School and was named president in 1970. He became chairman after the retirement of his father in 1978.

== Expansion ==
The company opened a second branch location in Toms River in 1964 in the Toms River Shopping Center. Charles H. Reynolds was president at this time. The store was reported to be "completely air-conditioned". George F. was 99 years old and still chairman of the board.

The Perth Amboy store was closed in 1966, after about 60 years of operation. As the largest clothing store in the city, it was "regarded as an institution" but suffered from a declining downtown. The executive staff relocated to the Toms River store. Later that year, a new store was opened in Somerville at the Somerset Shopping Center. This store was air-conditioned with 18,000 sq ft (1,700 m^{2}) of retail space. The store was divided into various specialty shops, a new retailing trend.

Charles H. Reynolds Jr. continued the expansion after becoming president in 1970. He added a third store in Hackettstown to the existing Toms River and Somerville locations.

A fourth location, the 13,500 sq ft (1,250 m^{2}) Woodbridge store, opened in November 1972. The store was near the original Perth Amboy location, about 5 miles (8.0 km) away. It was the first store in the chain to display merchandise with etageres. The store had 40 feet (12 m) of glass window displays in the front facade. The store was opened at a ceremony when a ribbon was cut by a 12-year-old great-grandson of the founder.

In 1975, the company was awarded a $300,000 loan by the New Jersey Economic Development Authority for the construction of a warehouse and distribution building in Toms River. The project was expected to create 22 new jobs. (Note: The distribution center was actually in Lakewood at 1000 Airport Road and also became the company headquarters.)

The next opening was the Manahawkin in December 1975. The $1 million store contained 13,000 sq ft (1,200 m^{2}) of retail space. (Note: This store was also reported to be the fourth location. The Woodbridge store was not listed as a location in 1978 and may have closed within a few years of opening.)

In 1978, with Charles Reynolds Jr. as chairman, the store had four locations in Toms River, Somerville, Manahawkin, and Hackettstown and employed 100 people in the stores and its headquarters. It was planning to add two new stores each year for five years throughout Monmouth and Ocean Counties under the leadership of Joseph B. Siegel, the new company president who had been recruited from Roos/Atkins in San Francisco. The stores, around 15,000 sq ft (1,400 m^{2}), sold men's, women's, and children's clothing and accessories and the company was expanding primarily into shopping mall locations with better parking than downtown stores.

A fifth store was added in early 1985 in Rio Grande. The other open locations at the time were Toms River, Somerville, Hackettstown, and Manahawkin. The Somerville store was extensively renovated in 1986, changing from traditional to contemporary. A sixth store opened in Wall Township in September 1987. Plans were to open a new store about every other year. A new store in Franklin Park opened in 1990.

== Rafters subsidiary ==
The company established the off-price chain Rafters in 1978 which sold merchandise at a minimum 20% reduction to prices in the full-price stores. It did this by keeping costs down with simpler stores and displays and operating with a smaller profit margin. By 1985, there were eight Rafters locations in New Jersey and one outside Philadelphia, Pennsylvania. In 1986 there were 15 total locations including Reynolds and Rafters. In 1987, the company said it planned to open about three more Rafters locations yearly.

In 1993, the Somerville store was converted to a 12,000 sq ft (1,100 m^{2}) Rafters store. The Somerville Reynolds store was suffering from competition from stores at the Bridgewater Commons mall. This location was the 18th and the largest store in the Rafters chain.

== Sale and decline ==
The business was sold outside of the Reynolds family in 1996. President Charles H. Reynolds Jr. had four children but none were interested in joining the family business. The buyer was an investment group led by William Goldman, owner of Edison, New Jersey–based Excelled Sheepskin and Leather Coat Corp. The eight Reynolds locations, all in New Jersey, and 14 Rafters stores including 12 in New Jersey and two in Maryland were to continue to operate independently of the new owner. In 1996, at time of sale, the entire Reynolds company had 340 employees spread across its stores and 60 more in the headquarters and distribution center in Lakewood.

Sales dropped significantly in the late 1990s when the chain peaked at about 30 stores. It filed for reorganization under Chapter 11 bankruptcy in 2004. The company closed stores, eliminated its trucking operations, and reduced staff. It exited bankruptcy in September 2004 as an operator of three stores with 70 employees, down from 150. The distribution warehouse was closed in favor of a system that shipped product directly from manufacturers to the stores.

== Other ==
For many years, the employee annual outstanding achievement award was named the "Betty Award" in honor of Elizabeth "Betty" Reynolds, the wife of thirty-year company president Charles H. Reynolds Sr., son of the chain's founder. Betty Reynolds died in 2000 at age 97.
