= Lower Beeding =

Village and parish in West Sussex, England

Coordinates: 51.03291°N 0.26116°W

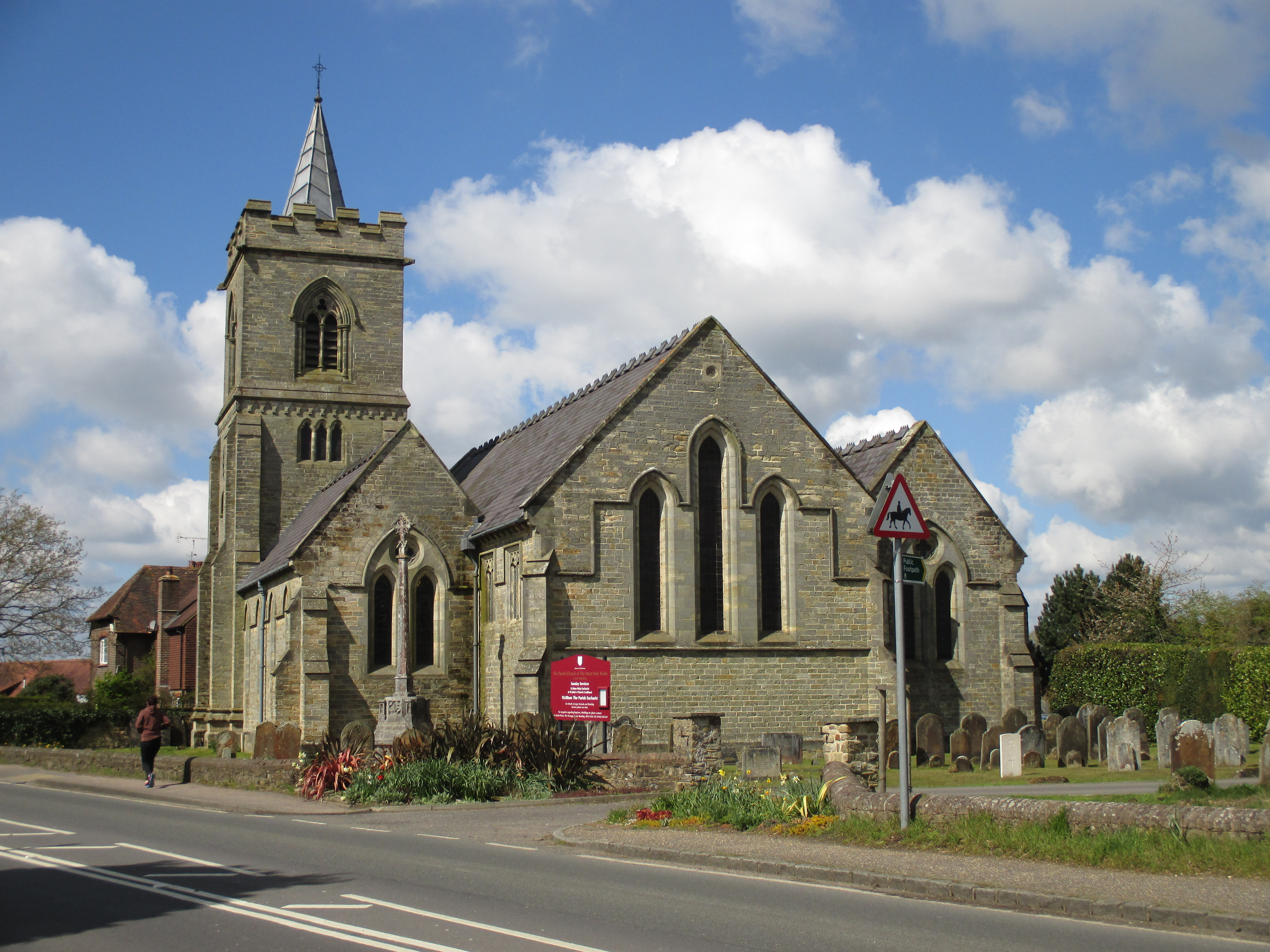
- Holy Trinity Church

- Location within West Sussex
- Area: 18.45 km^{2} (7.12 sq mi)
- Population: 1,001 2001 Census; 1,022 (2011 Census)
  - Density: 54/km^{2} (140/sq mi)
- OS grid reference: TQ220273
  - London: 33 miles (53 km) N
- Civil parish: Lower Beeding
- District: Horsham
- Shire county: West Sussex
- Region: South East
- Country: England
- Sovereign state: United Kingdom
- Post town: HORSHAM
- Postcode district: RH13
- Dialling code: 01403
- Police: Sussex
- Fire: West Sussex
- Ambulance: South East Coast
- UK Parliament: Horsham

Lower Beeding is a village and civil parish in the Horsham District of West Sussex, England. The village lies on the B2110, B2115 and A281 roads, 3.5 miles (6 km) south-east from Horsham, and is centred on Holy Trinity Church and The Plough public house, where the B2115 meets the B2110. The parish hamlets include Crabtree to the south of the village, and Ashfold Crossways and Plummer's Plain to the north-east. A spring at Plummer's Plain is the official source of the River Ouse, which eventually reaches the sea at Newhaven.

In the early 13th century, monks of Sele Priory (St Peter's Church, Upper Beeding) established a small mission base in St Leonard's Forest near Horsham, naming it Lower Beeding. Despite being about 12 miles (19 km) away, Lower Beeding remained part of (Upper) Beeding parish until Victorian times. The existence of Lower Beeding led to differentiation in the name of the original Beeding in some medieval sources, adding the 'Upper'.

A local landmark is Leonardslee Gardens, located between Lower Beeding village and Crabtree, which closed to the public in 2010 but reopened in April 2019.

The South Lodge Hotel in Lower Beeding was the venue for the 2009 G20 Summit meeting of finance ministers.

Newells Preparatory School was located in the village until 1968; it is today in Handcross and part of Brighton College.
