= Fool's Day (song) =

- Limited edition 7" cover

Single by Blur

from the album Blur 21
- Released: 17 April 2010
- Recorded: Early–April 2010
- Genre: Alternative rock
- Length: 3:27
- Label: Parlophone, EMI
- Songwriter(s): Damon Albarn; Graham Coxon; Alex James; Dave Rowntree
- Producer(s): Blur

Blur singles chronology
"Good Song" (2003)	"Fool's Day" (2010)	"Under the Westway" / "The Puritan" (2012)

Music video
- "Fools Day" on YouTube

"Fool's Day" is a song by English rock band Blur. It was released on 17 April 2010 and is the band's first single since 2003's "Good Song". The track was released as a 7" for Record Store Day, with only 1000 copies made. On 18 April 2010, to "avoid fans having to illegally obtain an inferior copy of this track from pirate sites", Blur made the song a free download on their website in both MP3 and WAV formats. The single is the first featuring guitarist Graham Coxon since 2000's "Music Is My Radar".

== Reception ==
Reception of the highly anticipated single was generally positive. NME reviewer Matt Wilkinson called the single "a bit bloody fantastic" in his review of the song. This Is Fake DIY's Stephen Ackroyd stated in his review that "It'd be fair to say elements of every era [of the band's sound] find themselves sitting pretty, though in such a way it still feels fresh – understated, sure, but with a touch of magic few other bands can match". The Guardian's Tim Jonze said it was "rather lovely".

== Personnel ==
- Damon Albarn: vocals, synthesizers
- Graham Coxon: guitar
- Alex James: bass guitar
- Dave Rowntree: drums

== Music video ==
Despite its small release, the song had a music video. Although all direction and production in the video is unknown, it completely consists of a close-up of a record needle, playing the "Fool's Day" 7" vinyl. It was posted up onto the Parlophone YouTube page in 2010.
