= Westbourne Terrace Road =

Street in the City of Westminster, London

Coordinates: 51°31′14.02″N 0°11′3.36″W

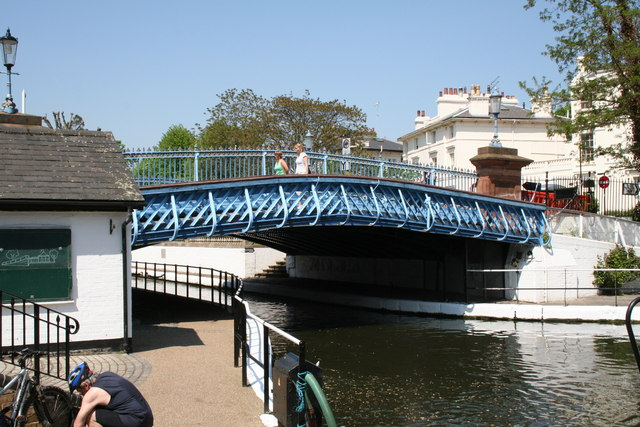
Westbourne Terrace Road bridge, the northern end of Westbourne Terrace Road

Westbourne Terrace Road runs between Blomfield Road in the north and Westbourne Bridge in the south. The north part of the road is a bridge over the Paddington branch of the Grand Union Canal in Little Venice known as Westbourne Terrace Road bridge. It is crossed by Delamere Terrace and Warwick Crescent in the north and joined by Blomfield Mews on its east side.

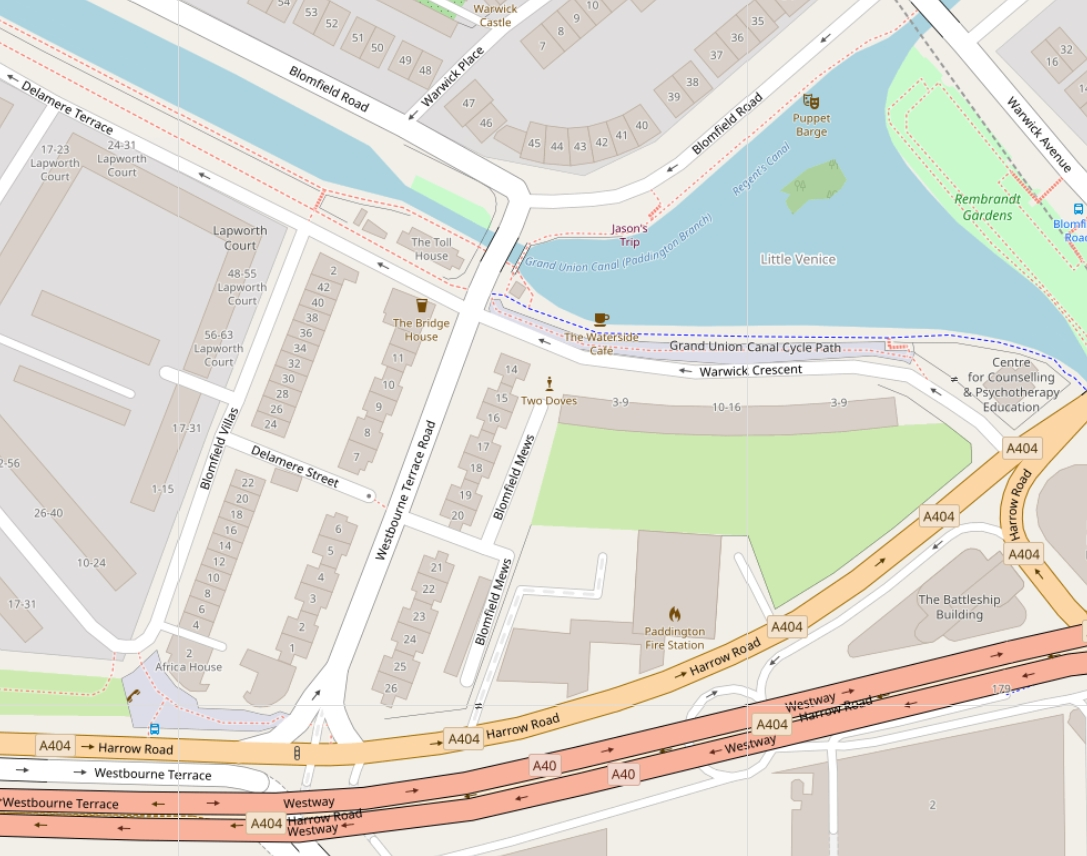
Westbourne Terrace Road map (centre, vertical)

The road was developed in 1850-55 and is composed mostly of stucco mid-nineteenth century terraced houses, the majority of which are grade II listed with Historic England.

The crime fiction writer Margery Allingham (1904-1966) lived at number 1 from 1916 to 1926 and a green plaque notes the fact.
