= Rafting (disambiguation) =

Rafting is traveling by raft.

Rafting may also refer to:

- Rafting event, in the context of biological migrations
- Timber rafting, log transportation method
- Ice rafting, transport of various material by ice
- Finger rafting, overlapping of two ice sheets
