= Henry Rafter =

British watercolourist and lithographer (born c. 1830)

Henry Rafter was a British master artist who can be categorized as part of the naturalism and realism movements. He is noted for his scenes of landscapes, nature and animals. He was also a prolific book illustrator, and produced several portraits as well. He worked in the 19th century in England, with watercolor and lithographs.

Henry Rafter was born around 1830 in Malta to Catherine Amelia Moore and Michael Rafter, and in 1855 he married Mary Christiana Sturtevant, 23, a student of the School of Arts in Coventry. In 1856, his work flourished; He produced approximately 50 paintings in that year. In 1856 he had an Exhibition of a Sporting Subject in Coventry Warwickshire, England.

In 1862, he resigned as the headmaster of the School of Arts of Coventry. He sent in a letter of resignation to his committee, giving as his main reason the falling-off of fees. Immediately following his appointment at Coventry, Rafter began further developing his lithography technique and pursuing patent licenses. On 21 April 1863 he was granted patent No. 2309 for "an improved process for obtaining printing surfaces". On 15 September 1864 he was granted patent No. 6641 for "producing relief printing surfaces". On 22 January 1884 he was granted a patent for an invention for "combining process with engraving relief for printed surfaces".

There are two lithography plates of Henry Rafter's in the permanent collection of the Victoria and Albert Museum in London, England: Illustrations to Wyatt’s “Industrial Arts of the Nineteenth Century” Plates 37, 47.

Henry Rafter had 9 children – Henry, Catherine, Francis, William, Adolphe, John, Lucius, Sylvia and Claude.

== Illustrated books ==
Smith, Richard Henry Jr. Twigs For Nests, or Notes on Nursery Nurture. General Books, London. (1866). ISBN 1-152-08945-5

Wyatt, Matthew Digby. The Industrial Arts of the Nineteenth Century. A Series of Illustrations of the Choicest Specimens Produced by Every Nation at the Great Exhibition of Works of Industry. London: Day & Son, (1851–53).

== Sources ==
- 1881 Census in Devonshire, England. Page 08588
- Hepworth, Thomas Cradock, and Sir William Crookes. "Patent Intelligence." The Photographic News for Amateur Photographers 28 (1884). Print.
- Houfe, Simon. The Dictionary of British Book Illustrators and Caricaturists, 1800-1914: with Introductory Chapters on the Rise and Progress of the Art. Woodbridge, Eng.: Antique Collectors' Club, 1978. Print.
- Macdonald, Stuart. The History and Philosophy of Art Education. Cambridge: Lutterworth, 2004. Print. pp 214
- Rafter, Henry. Letters to the Coventry School of Art Committee dated August 18, 1862 and September 3, 1862.
- Woodcroft, Bennett. Subject Matter Index of Patents Applied for and Patents Granted For the Year 1863. London, Office of the Commissioners of Patents for Inventions. 1870
- Direct correspondence with Susan Lambert|publisher=Department of Prints, Drawings and Paintings, Chief Curator from Victoria and Albert Museum, London, England date: January 27, 1998, https://web.archive.org/web/20100707013434/http://www.vam.ac.uk/index.html
