= Handcross =

Village in West Sussex, England

Coordinates: 51.05356°N 0.20044°W

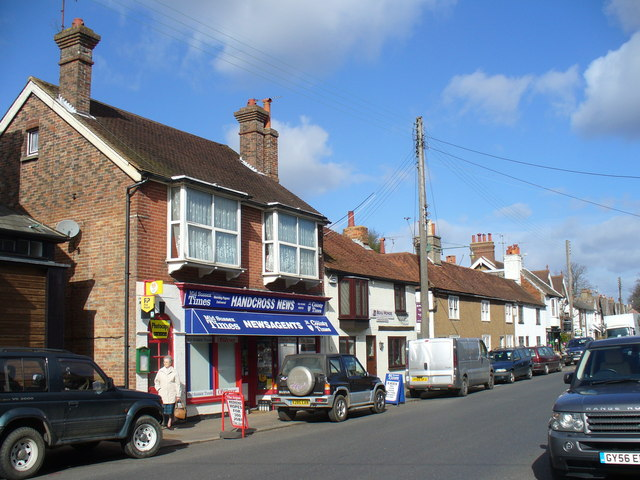

- Location within West Sussex
- OS grid reference: TQ262297
- Civil parish: Slaugham
- District: Mid Sussex
- Shire county: West Sussex
- Region: South East
- Country: England
- Sovereign state: United Kingdom
- Post town: HAYWARDS HEATH
- Postcode district: RH17
- Dialling code: 01444
- Police: Sussex
- Fire: West Sussex
- Ambulance: South East Coast
- UK Parliament: East Grinstead and Uckfield

Handcross is a village in the Mid Sussex District of West Sussex, England. It lies on the A23 road 4.2 miles (6.8 kilometres) south of Crawley. At the 2011 Census the population fell within the civil parish of Slaugham.

Nymans Garden, 30 acres (12 hectares) of parklands run by the National Trust, is located adjacent to the High Street, as are 20 acres (8 ha) of woodland and water gardens at High Beeches Garden.

Handcross has one public house, The Red Lion (High Street), which was refurbished in 2010 in contemporary style. It formerly had three, the other two being The Fountain (demolished in 2012 and replaced by housing) and The Royal Oak (closed in 2020 and reopened as an Indian restaurant in 2025). Handcross also has a Social club.

Handcross Primary School, situated at the northern end of the village recently underwent extensive building works to increase capacity. Opposite the primary school is Handcross Park School, an independent prep school.

== Handcross Hill ==
Handcross Hill is a stretch of the A23 road which runs past the village. This part of dual carriageway used to be notorious for accidents due to its being on a steep gradient, being surrounded by trees and containing a number of sharp bends, those being unsuitable for a road of its type.

On 12 July 1906, a bus crashed into a tree following a mechanical failure, killing 10 people and injuring 26 in the worst road crash in Sussex history.

The hill has proved to be dangerous enough to be widened and straightened by the Highways Agency and the cutting of the surrounding trees began overnight in mid-2011. The project was completed in late 2014.

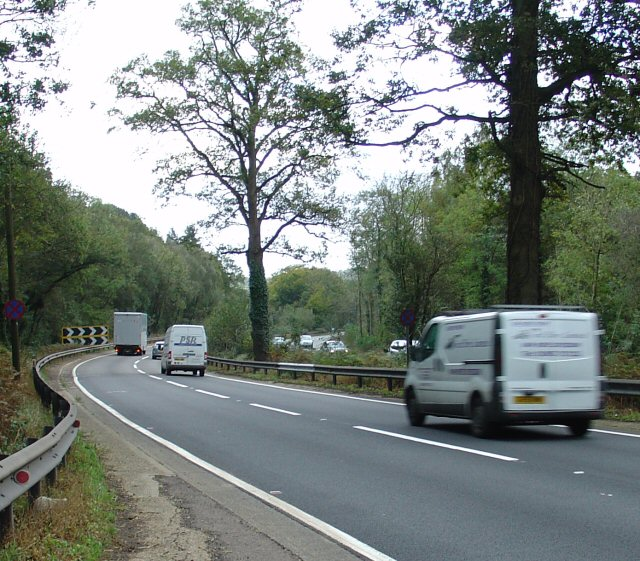
Sharp righthand bend on the original road design
