= Charmless Man =

1996 single by Blur

Single by Blur

from the album The Great Escape
- B-side: "The Horrors"; "A Song"; "St. Louis"
- Released: 29 April 1996 (UK)
- Genre: Britpop; baroque pop
- Length: 3:34
- Label: Food; Parlophone
- Composers: Damon Albarn; Graham Coxon; Alex James; Dave Rowntree
- Lyricist: Damon Albarn
- Producer: Stephen Street

Blur singles chronology
"Stereotypes" (1996)	"Charmless Man" (1996)	"Beetlebum" (1997)

Music video
- "Charmless Man" on YouTube

"Charmless Man" is a song by English rock band Blur and is the fourth track on their fourth studio album, The Great Escape (1995). It was produced by Stephen Street and released by Food Records and Parlophone on 29 April 1996 in the United Kingdom as the fourth and final single from that album. The single reached number five on the UK Singles Chart and also charted in Australia, France, Iceland, and Ireland. The accompanying music video was directed by Jamie Thraves and features Jean-Marc Barr.

The accompanying UK B-sides, "The Horrors", "A Song" and "St. Louis", continued the dramatic change in style for Blur first evidenced on the "Stereotypes" single, being stark and raw, foreshadowing the stylistic shift that would realize itself on their eponymous follow-up album.

== Background ==
The inspiration for the song was a visit by Damon Albarn to his grandmother in Lincolnshire. He stopped off at Grantham railway station and when inside the gentlemen's toilet, he noticed a piece of graffiti on a similar theme to the song's title.

== Critical reception ==
British magazine Music Week gave the song five out of five and named it Single of the Week, writing, "The fourth and final single from The Great Escape is probably its best track. This should restore Blur's status as a more-than-convincing chart band." Music & Media described it as "sheer foolishness". Smash Hits gave it four out of five, adding, "A tale of a bloke no-one likes. A wonderful, instant sing-a-long tune."

Morrissey stated that he liked the song in an interview at the time.

== Music video ==
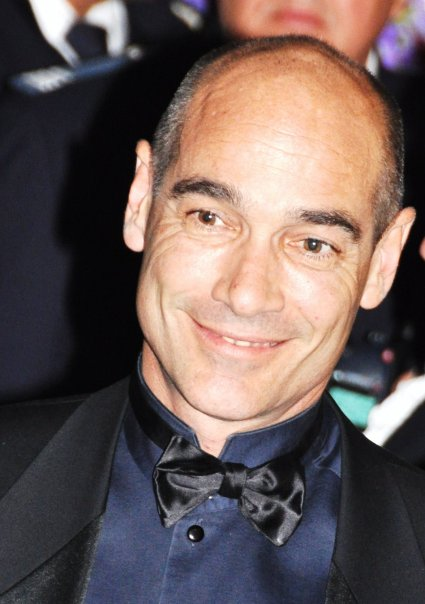
Jean-Marc Barr (pictured 2002) plays the Charmless Man in the music video

The music video for "Charmless Man" was directed by British film writer and director Jamie Thraves. It starts with a man (the Charmless Man, played by Jean-Marc Barr) running down a dark street with a makeshift bandage or wrapping on his right hand, while cross cut edits show Blur playing in a music hall. After the verse which is accompanied by piano, the band are playing in the man's apartment in his bathroom, whilst the man uses an electric toothbrush and uses some red wine as mouthwash. After becoming fully dressed, the man goes out into the corridor, where the band are again. After pushing Damon Albarn out of the way, he enters a lift. The band once again are there. They are also there in the foyer when the man leaves the lift. The members of the band hang around outside, when the man, frustrated at the band following him anywhere he goes, pushes Albarn over and kicks him.

After collecting his car from the valet, the man drives off, hoping to be free from the band. They appear at the roadside twice as the man drives down the street. At the third time, the band are standing in the middle of the road and the man drives straight into them, knocking them all over. Following this latest appearance by the band, he smashes the car windows with his fists in anger. He is then seen again running on the dark street, with his badly cut hand wrapped, at which point it becomes clear that the earlier scene of him running was out of time sequence. He staggers into the hall, once again finding it his fate to see the band performing in front of him. He can escape neither the band nor his own nature. In the final shot, the camera zooms in onto Albarn's face as the final notes are sung and played and he has a contemptuous smile on his face.

== Track listings ==
All music was composed by Damon Albarn, Graham Coxon, Alex James and Dave Rowntree. All lyrics were composed by Albarn.

- UK 7-inch and cassette single
1. "Charmless Man"
2. "The Horrors"
- UK CD single
1. "Charmless Man"
2. "The Horrors"
3. "A Song"
4. "St. Louis"
- European CD single
1. "Charmless Man" – 3:33
2. "The Man Who Left Himself" – 3:21
- French CD single
1. "Charmless Man" – 3:34
2. "It Could Be You" (live) – 3:19
- Australasian CD single
1. "Charmless Man" – 3:33
2. "The Man Who Left Himself" – 3:21
3. "Tame" – 4:47
4. "Ludwig" – 2:24

== Personnel ==
- Damon Albarn – lead vocals, piano
- Graham Coxon – electric guitar, backing vocals
- Alex James – bass guitar
- Dave Rowntree – drums

== Charts ==
=== Weekly charts ===
Charts (1996)	Peak position
Australia (ARIA)	35
Europe (Eurochart Hot 100)	16
France (SNEP)	33
Iceland (Íslenski Listinn Topp 40)	6
Ireland (IRMA)	25
Israel (IBA)	29
Scotland Singles (Official Charts)	6
UK Singles (Official Charts)	5

=== Year-end charts ===
Charts (1996)	Position
Iceland (Íslenski Listinn Topp 40)	72

== Certifications ==
Region	Certification	Certified units/sales
United Kingdom (BPI)	Silver	200,000^{‡}
^{‡} Sales+streaming figures based on certification alone.

== Release history ==
Region	Date	Format(s)	Label(s)	Ref.
Australia	1996	CD	Food; Parlophone	
France	1996	CD	EMI Music France	
United Kingdom	29 April 1996	7-inch vinyl; CD; cassette	Food; Parlophone	
