= Bustin' + Dronin' =

Remix album / live album by Blur
- Released: 25 February 1998
- Recorded: 1996–1997
- Genres: Alternative rock; noise rock; trip hop; electronica; experimental
- Length: 84:34 (original release); 67:07 (2022 vinyl & CD reissue)
- Labels: Food; EMI
- Producers: Stephen Street; Alison Howe

Blur chronology
Blur (1997)	Bustin' + Dronin' (1998)	13 (1999)

Damon Albarn chronology
Blur (1997)	Bustin' + Dronin' (1998)	Ravenous (1999)

Professional ratings
Review scores
Source	Rating
AllMusic	2/5 stars
Encyclopedia of Popular Music	2/5 stars

Bustin' + Dronin' is a remix compilation/live album by the band Blur. It was originally only released in Japan but was also released in limited quantities in the UK and the US, and being released only on double-CD format. The first disc featured all the remixed songs from the band's eponymous album, Blur. After five albums with the same producer (Stephen Street), Food Records turned the songs from Blur over to other producers for remixing. The band later chose William Orbit to produce their sixth studio album, 13. The second disc featured their live at John Peel's live session called "Peel Acres". Due to its low key, limited release in the UK, Bustin' + Dronin' only reached number 50 on the albums chart, though it is the only import release by the band to chart in the UK.

The album was reissued in 2022 on coloured vinyl and CD as a Record Store Day exclusive, making it the first time it has been available on the vinyl format. However, this reissue omits the live album part recorded at Peel Acres that was included in the original release.

== Track listing ==
All lyrics are written by Damon Albarn; all music is composed by Damon Albarn, Graham Coxon, Alex James and Dave Rowntree.

Disc one (original release, 2022 vinyl & CD reissue)
No.	Title	Remixer	Length
1.	"Movin' On" (William Orbit mix)	William Orbit	7:56
2.	"Death of a Party" (Well Blurred remix)	Adrian Sherwood	6:45
3.	"On Your Own" (Crouch End Broadway mix)	William Orbit	4:11
4.	"Beetlebum" (Moby's mix)	Moby	6:42
5.	"Essex Dogs" (Thurston Moore's mix)	Thurston Moore	9:00
6.	"Death of a Party" (Billy Whiskers mix)	William Orbit	4:45
7.	"Theme From Retro" (John McEntire's mix)	John McEntire	5:41
8.	"Death of a Party" (12" Death)	Adrian Sherwood	7:07
9.	"On Your Own" (Walter Wall mix)	William Orbit	15:00

Disc two (Live at Peel Acres, original release only)
No.	Title	Length
10.	"Popscene"	3:05
11.	"Song 2"	1:50
12.	"On Your Own"	4:47
13.	"Chinese Bombs"	1:15
14.	"Movin' On"	3:21
15.	"M.O.R."	2:59

== Personnel ==
- Miti Adhikari – engineer
- Damon Albarn – vocals
- Alan Branch – engineer
- Cesare – turntables
- Graham Coxon – cover art concept
- Alison Howe – producer
- Alex James – group member
- John McEntire – remixing
- Moby – producer, remixing
- Thurston Moore – mixing
- William Orbit – producer, remixing
- Jeff Parker – guitar
- Dave Rowntree – group member
- Adrian Sherwood – mixing
- John Smith – engineer
- Stephen Street – producer

== Charts and certifications ==
=== Weekly charts ===
Weekly chart performance for Bustin' + Dronin'
Chart	Position
Australian Albums (ARIA)	163
Hungarian Albums (MAHASZ)	19
Japanese Albums (Oricon)	50
Scottish Albums (Official Charts)	30
UK Albums (Official Charts)	100

=== Certifications ===
Certifications for Bustin' + Dronin'
Region	Certification	Certified units/sales
Japan (RIAJ)	Gold	100,000^{^}
^{^} Shipments figures based on certification alone.
