= Live at the Budokan (Blur album) =

Live album by Blur
- Released: 22 May 1996
- Recorded: 8–9 November 1995
- Venue: Budokan, Tokyo
- Genre: Britpop
- Length: 96:24
- Label: Food/EMI

Blur chronology
| The Great Escape (1995) | Live at the Budokan (1996) | Blur (1997) |

Live at the Budokan is a two-disc live album by the English band Blur, recorded during the 1995 tour for their album The Great Escape, at the Budokan on 8 November 1995. Until 2009, it was the only official standalone live Blur album.

Two songs performed at concert that didn't make the cut for the album can be found on the Japanese single, "It Could Be You": "Charmless Man" (originally performed before "Jubilee") and "Chemical World" (originally performed before "Coping"). The version of "She's So High" is an anomaly, as it is actually the 9 November 1995 performance from the NHK Hall in Tokyo.

It was originally released only in Japan but was later made available internationally via iTunes in 2014. To commemorate the album's 30th anniversary, a two LP vinyl version was released for Record Store Day 2026.

== Reception ==
Professional ratings
Review scores
| Source | Rating |
|---|---|
| AllMusic | 3/5 stars |
| Encyclopedia of Popular Music | 3/5 stars |

Writing for AllMusic, Ned Raggett found that the album "conclusively demonstrates that in concert Blur is Coxon's band, not Albarn's" with the latter seeming "somewhat tired at points and a parody of himself at his most English at others." In their mini-review, CDJournal called the release of the band's Budokan performance "proof of their importance."

== Track listing ==
=== Disc one ===
| No. | Title | Length |
|---|---|---|
| 1. | "The Great Escape" | 1:37 |
| 2. | "Jubilee" | 3:13 |
| 3. | "Popscene" | 3:11 |
| 4. | "End of a Century" | 2:56 |
| 5. | "Tracy Jacks" | 4:09 |
| 6. | "Mr. Robinson's Quango" | 5:02 |
| 7. | "To the End" | 4:18 |
| 8. | "Fade Away" | 4:20 |
| 9. | "It Could Be You" | 3:13 |
| 10. | "Stereotypes" | 3:29 |
| 11. | "She's So High" | 5:26 |
| 12. | "Girls & Boys" | 4:50 |
| 13. | "Advert" | 3:28 |
| 14. | "Intermission" | 1:39 |
| 15. | "Bank Holiday" | 1:51 |
| 16. | "For Tomorrow" | 6:26 |
| 17. | "Country House" | 4:40 |
| 18. | "This Is a Low" | 5:12 |
| 19. | "Supa Shoppa" | 3:23 |

=== Disc two ===
| No. | Title | Length |
|---|---|---|
| 1. | "Yuko and Hiro" | 4:44 |
| 2. | "He Thought of Cars" | 5:03 |
| 3. | "Coping" | 3:23 |
| 4. | "Globe Alone" | 2:43 |
| 5. | "Parklife" | 3:37 |
| 6. | "The Universal" | 5:11 |

== Charts ==
Chart performance for Live at the Budokan
| Chart (1996) | Peak position |
|---|---|
| Japanese Albums (Oricon) | 36 |
| Chart (2026) | Peak position |
| Greek Albums (IFPI) | 78 |
| Hungarian Physical Albums (MAHASZ) | 16 |
| Scottish Albums (OCC) | 8 |
| UK Albums (OCC) | 77 |
