= The Narcissist (song) =

Single by Blur

from the album The Ballad of Darren
- Released: 18 May 2023
- Recorded: January–May 2023
- Studio: Studio 13, London & Devon
- Genre: Alternative rock; indie pop; pop rock; arena pop
- Length: 4:05
- Label: Parlophone; Warner
- Composers: Damon Albarn; Graham Coxon; Alex James; Dave Rowntree
- Lyricist: Damon Albarn
- Producer: James Ford

Blur singles chronology
| "I Broadcast" (2015) | "The Narcissist" (2023) | "St. Charles Square" (2023) |

"The Narcissist" is a song by English rock band Blur. It was released on 18 May 2023 as the lead single for the band's ninth studio album The Ballad of Darren. The release of the track marked the first new material by the band since The Magic Whip in 2015.

On 23 May 2024, the work was nominated for the Best Song Musically and Lyrically Ivor Novello Award.

== Reception ==
Alexis Petridis of The Guardian gave the track 4 out of 5 stars, calling it far less confounding and straightforward than "Go Out", the lead single of the band's previous record, The Magic Whip. He also called the rhythm track and beat Motorik-esque.

Mollie Potter of The Edge gave it 4.5 stars out of 5, calling the track a "brilliant, crafty acknowledgement of their past triumphs, alongside a recognition of their growth as a band in the decades following their nineties heydey".

Christopher Jackson of City A.M. described the track as a soundtrack to the summer.

Consequence selected the track as its song of the week on 19 May 2023, calling it "an odyssey that builds but never implodes".

== Chart performance ==
In the United Kingdom, "The Narcissist" peaked at number 81 on the UK Singles Chart in June 2023, and was the band's first entry on the chart since "Under the Westway" in 2012.

In the United States, "The Narcissist" debuted on Billboard's Alternative Airplay chart at number 37 on June 10, 2023. The song was Blur's first appearance on the chart since "Crazy Beat" in May 2003, which broke the record for the longest time between entries by a band in the chart's history.

== Personnel ==
Blur

- Damon Albarn – lead vocals, keyboards
- Graham Coxon – guitar, backing vocals
- Alex James – bass guitar
- Dave Rowntree – drums

Additional Personnel

- James Ford - keyboards

== Charts ==
Chart performance for "The Narcissist"
| Chart (2023) | Peak position |
|---|---|
| Japan Hot Overseas (Billboard Japan) | 17 |
| New Zealand Hot Singles (RMNZ) | 33 |
| UK Singles (Official Charts) | 81 |
| US Rock & Alternative Airplay (Billboard) | 34 |
