= Stereotypes (song) =

1996 single by Blur

Single by Blur

from the album The Great Escape
- B-side: "The Man Who Left Himself"; "Tame"; "Ludwig"
- Released: 12 February 1996
- Genre: Britpop
- Length: 3:10
- Label: Food, Parlophone
- Composers: Damon Albarn, Graham Coxon, Alex James, Dave Rowntree
- Lyricist: Damon Albarn
- Producer: Stephen Street

Blur singles chronology
"The Universal" (1995)	"Stereotypes" (1996)	"Charmless Man" (1996)

Music video
- "Stereotypes" on YouTube

"Stereotypes" is a song by English rock band Blur and is the opening track to their fourth studio album, The Great Escape (1995). It was released on 12 February 1996 as the third single from that album, charting at number seven on the UK Singles Chart. It also charted in Australia, peaking at number 95 on the ARIA Singles Chart in June 1996. The accompanying UK B-sides—"The Man Who Left Himself", "Tame" and "Ludwig"—demonstrated a dramatic change in style for Blur, being stark and raw, foreshadowing the stylistic shift that would realize itself on their eponymous follow-up album.

== Music video ==
The music video which was directed by Matthew Longfellow features live footage. Whereas the previous live video promo "End of a Century" was live in picture and sound, "Stereotypes" is simply live footage edited to fit the album track recording.

== Track listings ==
All music was composed by Damon Albarn, Graham Coxon, Alex James, and Dave Rowntree. All lyrics were composed by Albarn.

UK and Australasian CD single

1. "Stereotypes"
2. "The Man Who Left Himself"
3. "Tame"
4. "Ludwig"

UK 7-inch and cassette single

1. "Stereotypes" – 3:11
2. "The Man Who Left Himself" – 3:21
3. "Tame" – 4:47

European CD single

1. "Stereotypes" – 3:09
2. "The Horrors" – 3:17

Italian CD single

1. "Stereotypes" – 3:09
2. "The Horrors" – 3:17
3. "A Song" – 1:45
4. "St. Louis" – 3:12

== Personnel ==
- Damon Albarn – lead vocals, synthesizers, organ
- Graham Coxon – electric guitar, backing vocals
- Alex James – bass guitar
- Dave Rowntree – drums

== Charts ==
Chart (1996)	Peak position
Australia (ARIA)	95
Europe (Eurochart Hot 100)	34
Scotland Singles (OCC)	11
UK Singles (OCC)	7
