= The Universal =

1995 single by Blur

Single by Blur

from the album The Great Escape
- B-side: "Ultranol"; "No Monsters in Me"; "Entertain Me" (remix)
- Released: 13 November 1995
- Genre: Britpop
- Length: 3:59
- Label: Food; Parlophone
- Composers: Damon Albarn; Graham Coxon; Alex James; Dave Rowntree
- Lyricist: Damon Albarn
- Producer: Stephen Street

Blur singles chronology
"Country House" (1995)	"The Universal" (1995)	"Stereotypes" (1996)

Audio sample
- "The Universal": file; help

Music video
- "The Universal" on YouTube

"The Universal" is a song by English rock band Blur and is featured on their fourth studio album, The Great Escape (1995). It was released on 13 November 1995 by Food Records and Parlophone as the second single from that album, charting at number five on the UK Singles Chart and number 12 in both Iceland and Ireland.

In keeping with the song's science fiction theme, the single's cover art is an allusion to the opening shot of 2001: A Space Odyssey, and alludes to the song's lyrical hook (it really, really could happen), whilst the music video, directed by Jonathan Glazer, is a tribute to the film A Clockwork Orange, with the band dressed up in costumes similar to Alex and his droogs. Both films were directed by Stanley Kubrick.

== Critical reception ==
Simon Williams from NME named the song Single of the Week and praised it as "rather brilliant", writing, "A ludicrously grandiose ballad that weeps spiritual buckets and sweeps the same swish floor as 'This Is a Low'. It's exotic! It has strings and things! It will turn your hard bastard spine into vodka jelly when they play it in an arena near you at Crimbo! And — crucially — it ends like 'The Orinoco Song' by The Wombles. As all songs should." David Cavanagh from Select said, "'Universal' (considered at one time as a possible album title) is a grandiose and sublime ballad that looks in on the citizens of the 21st century. Musically, 'Universal' is this album's 'To the End' — strings, brass, girl singers, languid vocal lines and a sweeping, epic feel. The song and the overall performances are breathtaking."

Gill Whyte from Smash Hits named it Best New Single, writing, "Blur-limey! How many people are on this record exactly? There's the string section, brass band, ladies' choir and very probably Uncle Tom Cobbly on zimmer. Ooh, and what a big noise it is! The thing's a colossus! A huge end-of-concert lighter-waving anthem all about..." In a separate review, the magazine added, "Sounds like a waltz your mum would glide around to. Best heard with the light off, so you can think about life and that."

== Music video ==
A scene from the music video for "The Universal" which was inspired from the 1971 film A Clockwork Orange, featuring the band as quasi-Droogs in an all-white bar, complete with Albarn wearing an eyeliner similar to Alex DeLarge.

A music video for the song was directed by English film director and screenwriter Jonathan Glazer. The band is presented in imitation of the opening scenes from the 1971 film A Clockwork Orange, in the Milk Bar. Blur star as the quasi-Droogs, complete with Damon Albarn wearing eyeliner similar to the character Alex DeLarge. They perform in the bar in all-white. Though the band do not engage in their usual vibrant stage demeanour, Damon Albarn frequently turns to the camera and gives a sly, crooked smile. Graham Coxon spends the majority of the video sitting against the wall, while playing his guitar. They also spend some time during the video sitting at a table, watching the people around them.

The bar patrons consist of different groups; a male with two females are openly kissing. The man has lipstick all over his face; a lone female entertains male business colleagues by exploiting their sexual interest in her; two men, one identified as a 'red man' (dressed entirely in red) who used to be 'blue', conduct a stilted (subtitled) conversation; two other men – one of them wearing a vicar's clerical collar – become increasingly drunk on cocktails, laughing more and more hysterically until the clergyman tells his friend something to which the viewer is not privy, causing his friend to withdraw into stunned silence (a device similar to that used in Radiohead's promotional video for the song "Just" in the same year). There are also two old men who make a few comments (again subtitled) marvelling at the scene. Blur then walk down the aisle to exit the building. Damon Albarn stops them, then the clergyman moves in to kiss his friend. There are also scenes outside, showing high rise buildings, where people are gathered around a golf ball speaker atop a roof, listening.

A full back-to-film restoration was undertaken by renowned post-production facility, Vanderquest, in 2025 by re-scanning the original 16mm film negatives and was released in 4K Ultra HD in November that year to celebrate its 30 year anniversary.

== Track listings ==
All music was composed by Albarn, Coxon, James, and Rowntree. All lyrics were written by Albarn.

- UK CD1 and Australian CD single
1. "The Universal" – 4:00
2. "Ultranol" – 2:42
3. "No Monsters in Me" – 3:38
4. "Entertain Me" (The Live It! remix) – 7:19
- UK CD2: The Universal II – Live at the BBC
1. "The Universal" – 4:11
2. "Mr Robinson's Quango" – 4:17
3. "It Could Be You" – 3:17
4. "Stereotypes" – 3:12
- UK cassette single and European CD single
1. "The Universal" – 3:53
2. "Entertain Me" (The Live It! remix) – 7:14
- Japanese CD single
1. "The Universal" – 4:00
2. "It Could Be You" (live at the BBC) – 3:17
3. "Stereotypes" (live at the BBC) – 3:12
4. "Entertain Me" (The Live It! remix) – 7:19

== Charts ==
=== Weekly charts ===
Chart (1995–1996)	Peak position
Australia (ARIA)	104
Europe (Eurochart Hot 100)	31
Europe (European Hit Radio)	24
Iceland (Íslenski Listinn Topp 40)	12
Ireland (IRMA)	12
Israel (IBA)	8
Scotland Singles (Official Charts)	5
Sweden (Sverigetopplistan)	55
UK Singles (Official Charts)	5

=== Year-end charts ===
Chart (1995)	Position
UK Singles (OCC)	86

== Certifications ==
Region	Certification	Certified units/sales
United Kingdom (BPI)	Gold	400,000^{‡}
^{‡} Sales+streaming figures based on certification alone.

== Release history ==
Region	Date	Format(s)	Label(s)	Ref.
United Kingdom	13 November 1995	CD; cassette	Parlophone; Food	
Australia	20 November 1995	CD	EMI	
Japan	20 December 1995	CD	EMI; Food	

== Cover version ==
- A cover by Irish singer Joe Dolan in 1998 reached number 19 on the Irish Singles Chart.
