= Juliet Harbutt =

New Zealand cheese expert

- Born: Auckland, New Zealand
- Other name: Master of Cheese
- Occupations: Cheese expert: author, educator, judge, campaigner, consultant, trainer and speaker
- Website: www.thecheeseweb.com

Juliet Harbutt is a New Zealand cheese expert. She is an author, judge, consultant, campaigner, speaker, educator and tour guide. She acted as consultant to Prince Charles and Alex James when they were developing their own cheeses. In the 1990s she worked with Tesco in devising their cheese classification system. In 2000 she created The Great British Cheese Festival.

== Career ==
In the 1970s Harbutt opened a café deli, The Parson’s Nose in Wellington, New Zealand. In 1983, while travelling around Europe, she attended cookery classes in Paris, where she discovered a passion for cheese, saying it was “a revelation to someone who had grown up with block cheddar.” She also visited Steven Spurrier’s wine shop Les Caves de la Madeleine.

After selling The Parson’s Nose she moved to England in 1983, where she co-founded Jeroboams – the Wine and Cheese Shop, in South Kensington, which was “largely responsible for introducing London to a whole new cheese concept.” After realising that “selling cheese was not enough” she sold the company to her partner in 1991, moved to the Cotswolds in Oxfordshire, where she ran cheese-related masterclasses and events and began to publish books.

She acted as a cheese consultant for clients that included Tesco, Harrods and Marks & Spencer. She has judged cheese competitions in Switzerland, France and America. She is a member of the Guild des Fromagers - Confrerie de Saint-Uguzon and Chevaliers de Tastefromage. In 1992 she was given the title Confrerie des Chevaliers du Taste-Fromage de France. She has been a visiting lecturer at the University of Gastronomic Sciences in Pollenzo, Italy. She has helped many people design and launch their own cheeses, including the then Prince Charles and her Cotswolds neighbour, Alex James.

Highlights include:

- 1989 – helped establish the UK's Specialist Cheesemakers Association
- 1994 – founded the British Cheese Awards, including devising a system for classifying cheeses by the type of rind and the fat content. She sold the awards to the Royal Bath and West of England Society in 2015.
- 1994 – created the New Zealand Cheese Awards
- 1998 – developed Tesco's cheese classification system
- 1998 – joined the Slow Food movement, setting up the Cotswold Convivium
- 2000 – created The Great British Cheese Festival

In 2016, after 35 years in England she moved to Hawke's Bay, New Zealand where she established Hunter Gatherer Tours.

=== Cheese making and selecting ===
Harbutt made two cheeses with Alex James: Little Wallop (2007) and Farleigh Wallop (2009), the latter won the Best Goat’s Cheese award at the 2009 British Cheese Awards.

She created the Simply the Best range, a selection of award-winning artisanal English cheeses, including Creamy Lancashire, Smoked Lyburn and Double Gloucester.

== Publications ==
- The Specialist Cheesemakers’ Association Guide to the Finest Cheese of Britain and Ireland (1999) Pub. Specialist Cheesemakers’ Association
- Cheese: A Complete Guide to Over 300 Cheeses of Distinction (1999) Pub. Mitchell Beazley ISBN 978-1840000801
- The Wine and Cheese Collection with Roz Denny and Stuart Walton (1999) Pub. Anness Publishing ISBN 978-1843092056
- A Cook’s Guide to Cheese (2000) with Roz Denny. Pub. Hermes House ISBN 978-0754800262
- Cheese: A Feast of International Dishes (2001) with Roz Denny. Pub. Hermes House ISBN 9780754809920
- Cheese: A Comprehensive Guide to Cheeses of the World (2002) Pub. Anness Publishing ISBN 9781844769407
- The World Encyclopaedia of Cheese (2002) with Roz Denny. Pub. Anness Publishing ISBN 9781843096719
- British Cheese Directory (2002) Pub. Juliet Harbutt
- The Cheese Lover’s Kitchen Handbook (2004) with Roz Denny. Pub. Southwater ISBN 9781842159453
- Cheese: A Visual Guide to 400 Cheeses with 150 Recipes: A Directory of the World’s Best (2008) with Roz Denny. Pub. Southwater ISBN 9781844764815
- Cheeses and How to Use Them (2009) with Roz Denny. Pub. Southwater
- World Cheese Book (2009) (translated into 9 languages) Pub. Dorling Kindersley ISBN 9780241186572
- Leith’s Easy Dinner Parties (2009) contributor. Pub. Bloomsbury ISBN 9780747521877
- Illustrated Cook’s Guide to Cheese: A Comprehensive Visual Identifier to the Cheeses of the World (2010) with Kate Whiteman. Pub. Southwater ISBN 9781844769407
- Wine and Cheese: A Complete Guide to the World of Wine and Cheese (2010) with Stuart Walton. Pub. Anness Publishing ISBN 9780754820161
- The Illustrated Cook’s Book of Ingredients (2010) contributor. Pub. DK Publishing ISBN 9781405353182

She has written for magazines, including Bon Appétit (USA), Cheese Buyer Magazine, Speciality Food, Dish.co.nz, and NZ House and Garden.

== TV and radio ==
Harbutt has made regular radio appearances. She has also appeared on BBC 1's Eat Your Words (1996), Ready Steady Cook, Saturday Kitchen, The Hairy Bikers' Food Tour of Britain (2009), Come Dine with Me (winner) (2009) and BBC 4's The Food Programme - A Life Through Food (2015).

== Awards ==
- 2006 Dairy Person of The Year
- 2008 Good Housekeeping’s Favourite Food Hero
- 2008 Cotswold Life Food Personality of the Year
- 2010 Food Book of the Year for the World Food Book
- 2010 Guild of Food Writers Award for The World Cheese Book
- 2010 New Zealander of the Year (UK) (finalist)

== See also ==
Eat Up! The Best British Cooking Is Not Dead, It’s Just Hiding (2010) Pub. Kyle Cathie
