= Gourock Outdoor Pool =

Outdoor swimming pool in Inverclyde, Scotland

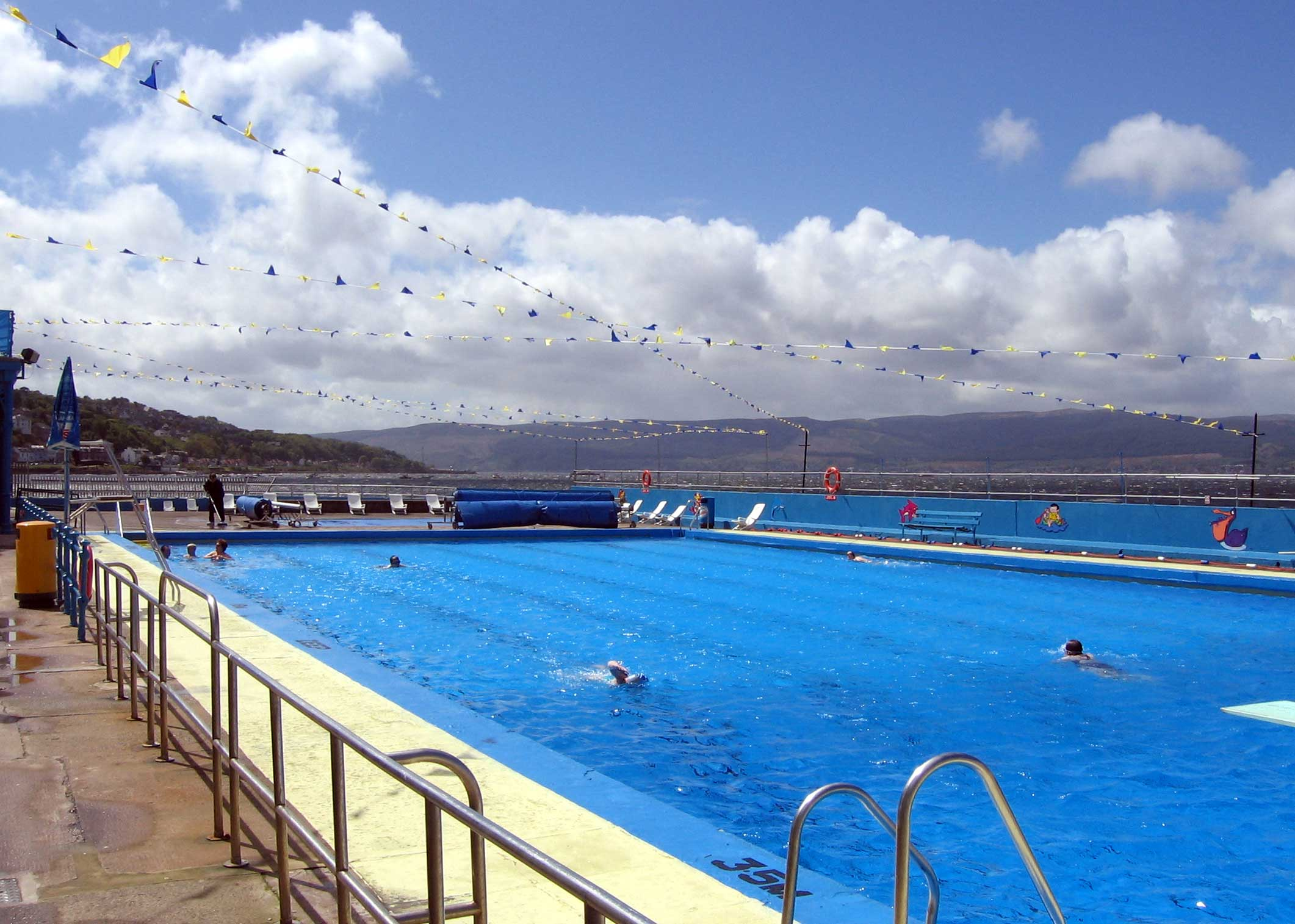
- Gourock Outdoor Pool in 2006
- Interactive map of Gourock Outdoor Pool
- Location: Albert Road, Gourock, Inverclyde, Scotland, PA19 1NQ
- Coordinates: 55.961057°N 4.822564°W
- Operator: Inverclyde Leisure Trust
- Type: salt water
- Dimensions: Length: 33.3 metres (109 ft); Width: 15 metres (49 ft); Depth: 3.5 metres (11 ft)

Construction
- Opened: 1909

Website
- Official website

Gourock Outdoor Pool is a salt water public lido in Gourock, Inverclyde, Scotland. It is the oldest heated swimming pool in Scotland.

== Description ==
The pool is heated and uses salt water taken from the Firth of Clyde. The water is filtered, cleaned and maintained at a minimum temperature of 29 °C (84 °F). Facilities include a gym and a children's pool. The lido opens from May to the first week in September.

The pool is 33.3 metres in length to accommodate a water polo pool with a goal at each end.

The pool is managed by Inverclyde Leisure.

== History ==
The lido was opened in 1909, and the water heating system was installed in 1969.

The pool was closed at the end of the 2010 summer season for a major improvement project, which was completed before the end of 2011. The existing changing accommodation was replaced with a more modern leisure centre, incorporating an enlarged gymnasium and lift access from the street level down to the new changing accommodation and the upgraded pool.

A 2004 photograph of the pool by Martin Parr was used as the album cover for The Ballad of Darren (2023) by rock band Blur.

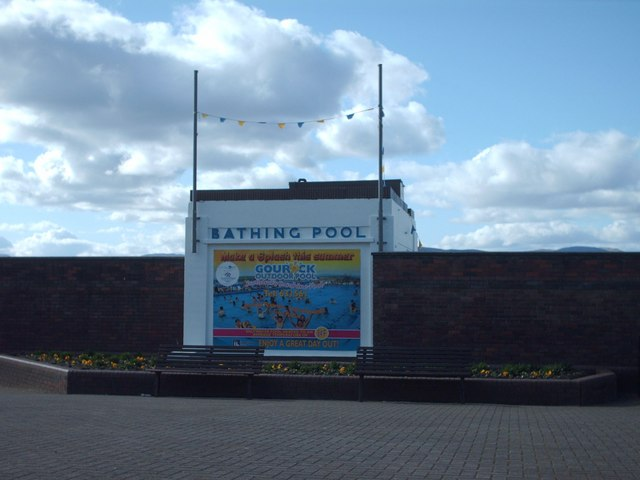
Pool entrance before refurbishment (2008)
