= The Ballad of Darren =

Studio album by Blur
- Released: 21 July 2023
- Recorded: January – May 2023
- Studios: Studio 13, London & Devon
- Genres: Alternative rock; indie rock; baroque pop; lounge pop
- Length: 36:04
- Labels: Parlophone; Warner
- Producer: James Ford

Blur chronology
The Magic Whip (2015)	The Ballad of Darren (2023)	Live at Wembley Stadium (2024)

Singles from The Ballad of Darren
- 1. "The Narcissist" Released: 18 May 2023; 2. "St. Charles Square" Released: 29 June 2023; 3. "Barbaric" Released: 21 July 2023

The Ballad of Darren is the ninth studio album by English rock band Blur. It was released on 21 July 2023 by Parlophone and Warner Records. The album's songs were written by frontman Damon Albarn in 2022 while on tour with Gorillaz, and composed by Albarn and the rest of the band. It was produced by James Ford at Studio 13 in London and Devon. It is Blur's first album since The Magic Whip (2015), and their shortest album, with a runtime under 40 minutes. The album's artwork features a 2004 photograph of a man swimming alone in the Gourock Outdoor Pool in Gourock, Scotland, taken by Martin Parr. Its title refers to Darren "Smoggy" Evans, the band's longtime bodyguard.

The Ballad of Darren received critical acclaim. It became the band's seventh consecutive album to debut at number one in the UK. It also topped the charts in Belgium, Ireland, Scotland and Switzerland, and became the band's first album to reach the Top 10 on the Top Album Sales chart in the US, reaching #8. The album was promoted by the singles "The Narcissist", "St. Charles Square" and "Barbaric", as well as a global tour.

== Background and recording ==
The band's eighth studio album The Magic Whip was released in April 2015 to critical acclaim and became the band's sixth UK number-one album. In April 2017, Damon Albarn's project Gorillaz released their fifth studio album, Humanz which was followed by three other albums, released in June 2018, October 2020, and February 2023 respectively. Albarn also released his second solo album, The Nearer the Fountain, More Pure the Stream Flows in November 2021. Guitarist Graham Coxon worked on soundtracks for the shows The End of the F***ing World and I Am Not Okay with This, while also releasing his debut album with side project the Waeve in February 2023. Meanwhile, drummer Dave Rowntree released his debut solo album, Radio Songs, in January 2023.

Albarn wrote demos for the album while touring with Gorillaz, in 2022. He recalled: "I recorded in a lot of conference rooms but I did actually have a wonderful moment in Montreal. Opposite my [hotel] room was this fantastic mural of Leonard Cohen." Some of the songs were demo'd during that time, and by New Year's Eve he had 24 songs. The album's opening track "The Ballad" is a reworked version of "Half a Song", a demo recorded by Albarn in 2003 during Blur's Think Tank tour and previously released on Albarn's 2003 EP Democrazy. In January 2023, Blur began recording material at Albarn's Studio 13 in London and Devon. James Ford, who previously worked with Gorillaz and Coxon's band the Waeve, produced the album. The record was finished by the first week of May 2023. Albarn described The Ballad of Darren as "the first legit Blur album since 13, because we approached it like we would have approached making a record before, with all of us together in the room."

Each member of the band shared a brief commentary on the record. To Albarn, the record signifies "an aftershock, reflection and comment on where we find ourselves now". Coxon added that, with age, it becomes more important "that what we play is loaded with the right emotion and intention". Albarn claimed the album reflects their generation but also "has enough of the modern world in it to kind of be relatable to people younger as well."

== Composition ==
=== Musical style and influences ===
The Ballad of Darren, an alternative rock and indie rock album, has been described as containing elements of baroque pop, lounge pop and 1970s' alternative pop. The album has been compared to the works of Lou Reed, John Cale, Radiohead's A Moon Shaped Pool and Blur's own Think Tank. Albarn noted that on this album, his way of singing was influenced by Alex Turner.

== Artwork and title ==
The album's cover is a 2004 photograph of a man swimming alone in the Gourock Outdoor Pool in Gourock, Scotland, taken by Martin Parr. Rowntree said of the cover: "There's quite a bit about that image which is about overcoming some sort of physical situation. There is something about the safety of this lido which can get worryingly rough, which it does, and there are stories of this place where this guy would go down and exercise and there would be sharks washed in by the sea."

The album's title references Darren "Smoggy" Evans, the band's former bodyguard, who currently works for frontman Damon Albarn. Albarn said: "Darren is many people. It is directly one person. [...] There's a picture of Darren in the album. Not on the front cover. It was going to be but then we put it on the inner sleeve because it's not the sort of attention Darren will want."

== Release and promotion ==
In June 2021, frontman Damon Albarn first hinted at new music from Blur and Gorillaz, ahead of his second solo studio release The Nearer the Fountain, More Pure the Stream Flows. At the time, he was in talks with drummer Dave Rowntree but plans had not come to fruition yet. On 14 November 2022, bassist Alex James spoke on the possibility of new music from the band in nearly eight years. The band announced a London reunion show at Wembley Stadium in summer 2023. The album was announced on 18 May 2023, alongside a short video directed by Toby L. The video shows the band in the studio with a snippet of "The Narcissist" playing in the background.

=== Singles and videos ===
The album's lead single, "The Narcissist," premiered on Steve Lamacq's BBC Radio 6 Music show, on 18 May 2023. That same day, an animated lyric video directed by Fons Schiedon, was released on the band's YouTube channel.

=== Tour ===
On 27 April 2023, Blur announced tour dates in the UK, Europe, Japan and South America. Starting on 19 May, the shows marked the first time the band had toured since 2015 and their first live appearance in four years.

== Critical reception ==
Professional ratings
Aggregate scores
Source	Rating
AnyDecentMusic?	7.9/10
Metacritic	84/100
Review scores
Source	Rating
AllMusic	4.5/5 stars
Clash	9/10
The Daily Telegraph	4/5 stars
The Guardian	4/5 stars
The Independent	5/5 stars
Mojo	4/5 stars
NME	4/5 stars
Pitchfork	7.2/10
The Skinny	4/5 stars
Under the Radar	9/10

The Ballad of Darren received critical acclaim and a score of 84 out of 100 on review aggregator Metacritic based on 24 critics' reviews, indicating "universal acclaim". Uncut felt that "better than simply a personal or a confessional album, The Ballad of Darren is clever in what it does and doesn't say about its creator's life", while Amanda Farah of The Quietus found the album to have "a gentler approach", describing it as "an almost-pop record with strong choruses but more ambling verses" and "a statement of where Blur are now".

Emma Harrison of Metro in her review said of the album that it was "Emotive, visceral and full of intent, Darren takes us on a soul searching journey which is a testimonial of how overcoming loss might just help you find yourself, your sound and your friends via the power of music", and that it was Blur's "most arrestingly intimate work since the likes of 13".

Joe Goggins of The Skinny remarked that Blur "shake off" their "latter-day heaviness" on "a handsome set that sounds like four mates having fun again". Reviewing the album for Clash, Gareth James stated that the "desire to reflect on those most important to the band is immediately evident", describing opening track "The Ballad" as "gorgeous" and "Barbaric" as "one of their very best" and concluding that the album ends with "no neat resolutions" on "The Heights". Jazz Monroe of Pitchfork described the album as "meticulously polished", writing that its "songs conjure something more real than anguish: the dulling of losses, the warm aura of midlife decline, and the fading belief, with advancing years, that crisis serves to raise the curtain on your next act".

=== Accolades ===
Mojo ranked The Ballad of Darren first on its list of the best albums of 2023. NME ranked the album at number 10 on their list of the 50 best albums of 2023, noting that it "would prove their best album since the '90s, a reckoning of lost relationships and middle-aged malaise". Additionally, The Guardian, The Telegraph, the BBC, Yahoo, Uncut magazine, Reader's Digest, The Independent, Rolling Stone, and NPR listeners' poll all had the album in their best-of-2023 lists.

== Track listing ==
All lyrics are written by Damon Albarn; all music is composed by Albarn, Graham Coxon, Alex James and Dave Rowntree.

The Ballad of Darren track listing
No.	Title	Length
1.	"The Ballad"	3:37
2.	"St. Charles Square"	3:55
3.	"Barbaric"	4:09
4.	"Russian Strings"	3:38
5.	"The Everglades (For Leonard)"	2:56
6.	"The Narcissist"	4:05
7.	"Goodbye Albert"	4:17
8.	"Far Away Island"	2:58
9.	"Avalon"	3:05
10.	"The Heights"	3:24
Total length:		36:04

Deluxe CD bonus tracks
No.	Title	Length
11.	"The Rabbi"	2:44
12.	"The Swan"	3:42
Total length:		42:30

Japanese bonus track
No.	Title	Length
13.	"Sticks and Stones"	3:24
Total length:		45:54

== Personnel ==
Blur

- Damon Albarn – vocals, backing vocals, piano, keyboards
- Graham Coxon – guitar, backing vocals, lead vocals on "Sticks and Stones"
- Alex James – bass guitar
- Dave Rowntree – drums

Additional musicians

- James Ford – keyboards
- The Demon Strings on (1, 3, 5, 7, 8, 10)
  - Izzi Dunn – cello
  - Kotono Sato – violin
  - Sarah Tuke – violin
  - Ciara Ismail – viola
- Chris Storr – trumpet (9)
- Danny Marsden – trumpet (9)
- Alistair White – trombone (9)
- Nichol Thompson – trombone (9)
- Mike Smith – brass arrangement (9)

Technical

- James Ford – production
- Samuel Egglenton – additional production, engineering
- David Wrench – mixing
- Grace Banks – mixing assistance
- Giacomo Vianello – engineering assistance
- Mat Bartram – strings engineering (1, 3, 5, 7, 8, 10), brass engineering (9)
- Luke Pickering – string engineering assistance (1, 3, 5, 7, 8, 10)
- Matt Colton – mastering
- Matt De Jong – creative direction, design
- Jamie-James Medina – creative direction, design
- Martin Parr – cover photography
- Mike Smith – inside photography
- Darren Evans – inside photography
- Fons Schiedon – illustrations

== Charts ==
=== Weekly charts ===
Weekly chart performance for The Ballad of Darren
Chart (2023)	Peak position
Australian Albums (ARIA)	10
Austrian Albums (Ö3 Austria)	2
Belgian Albums (Ultratop Flanders)	2
Belgian Albums (Ultratop Wallonia)	1
Danish Albums (Hitlisten)	3
Dutch Albums (Album Top 100)	5
Finnish Albums (Suomen virallinen lista)	34
French Albums (SNEP)	4
German Albums (Offizielle Top 100)	3
Greek Albums (IFPI Greece)	51
Hungarian Albums (MAHASZ)	6
Irish Albums (Official Charts)	1
Italian Albums (FIMI)	7
Japanese Albums (Oricon)	20
Japanese Digital Albums (Oricon)	15
Japanese Hot Albums (Billboard Japan)	18
New Zealand Albums (RMNZ)	7
Polish Albums (ZPAV)	57
Portuguese Albums (AFP)	2
Scottish Albums (Official Charts)	1
Spanish Albums (Promusicae)	7
Swedish Albums (Sverigetopplistan)	12
Swiss Albums (Schweizer Hitparade)	1
UK Albums (Official Charts)	1
US Billboard 200	94
US Top Alternative Albums (Billboard)	5

=== Year-end charts ===
Year-end chart performance for The Ballad of Darren
Chart (2023)	Position
Belgian Albums (Ultratop Flanders)	171
UK Vinyl Albums (OCC)	7

== Certifications ==
Certifications for The Ballad of Darren
Region	Certification	Certified units/sales
United Kingdom (BPI)	Silver	60,000^{‡}
^{‡} Sales+streaming figures based on certification alone.
