= Fat Les =

British pop band

- Genres: Pop, football chant
- Years active: 1998–2002, 2012
- Labels: Telstar, Turtleneck, Parlophone
- Past members: Alex James; Keith Allen; Damien Hirst

Fat Les were a British band consisting of Blur bassist Alex James, actor Keith Allen, and artist Damien Hirst. Vocals on their singles were provided by Keith Allen (all), Alex James ("Vindaloo"), Keith's daughter Lily Allen ("Who Invented Fish & Chips?"), Andy Kane ("Who Invented Fish & Chips?"), Lisa Moorish ("Naughty Christmas (Goblin in the Office)") and various choirs ("Jerusalem").

== Background ==
James and Hirst first knew each other when they were students at Goldsmiths College, but became friendly when they and Allen met at the Groucho Club. In May 1998, while discussing the forthcoming FIFA World Cup, Allen and James had the idea of creating an unofficial World Cup song, and formed Fat Les (named after a woman they knew). They were later joined by Hirst when they asked him to create artwork for them.

== Music ==
Fat Les created the unofficial England national football anthem "Vindaloo" with Guy Pratt and then brought in the singer Andy Kane. The song reached number two in the UK Singles Chart. In the music video, the three band members featured alongside Paul Kaye, Rowland Rivron, Ed Tudor-Pole, Matt Lucas and David Walliams, and appearances by Allen's children Lily and Alfie.

Later in 1998, they recorded "Naughty Christmas (Goblin In The Office)", described as the 'Official Christmas Record', together with Joe Strummer on guitar, Rivron on drums, as well as Matt Lucas and Paul Kaye, and features vocals by Lisa Moorish with Lily Allen in the background.

In 2000, Fat Les recorded an official theme for the England football team at Euro 2000 tournament held in Belgium and the Netherlands, with a rendition of the hymn "Jerusalem". It was again fronted by Allen, with Michael Barrymore making an appearance. The track was credited to Fat Les 2000. According to Allen, in choosing the hymn he wanted to "crystallise some kind of English culture" and to reclaim it from the Right. The song was recorded at George Martin's AIR Studios at a cost of £50,000 with a full orchestra and four choirs: the London Community Gospel Choir, New London Children's Choir, Syncopeters and London Gay Men's Chorus.

For the 2002 World Cup, they recorded "Who Invented Fish and Chips", which features Lily Allen in her first credited recording and video.

In 2012, Fat Les changed their name to "Fit Les" and recorded "The Official Fit Les Olympic Anthem". Alex James left the group while Rowetta of Happy Mondays fame joined the lineup along with producer Matt Eaton.

== Comedy ==
Fat Les also starred in a comedy show with Kaye, Lucas and John Thomson in You Are Here broadcast on Channel 4 on 30 December 1998.

== Discography ==
=== Singles ===
Title	Year	Peak position UK
"Vindaloo"	1998	2
"Naughty Christmas (Goblin in the Office)"	1998	21
"Jerusalem"	2000	10
"Who Invented Fish and Chips"	2002	86
"The Official Fit Les Olympic Anthem"	2012	—
