= WigWam (duo) =

British pop duo

- Origin: London, England
- Genres: Pop
- Years active: 2005–2006
- Labels: Instant Karma
- Members: Alex James; Betty Boo
- Website: www.myspace.com/wigwamrock

WigWam were an English pop duo, comprising Alex James, the bassist from Blur, and vocalist Betty Boo (Alison Clarkson). With record producer Ben Hillier, and former Boo collaborators Beatmasters, WigWam were said to be creating an album which they described as "experimental yet accessible 21st century pop".

The debut single "WigWam" was released on 3 April 2006 in two CD formats by Rob Dickins' Instant Karma record label. The music video to the single was filmed in Soho, London and was directed by Dom Joly, with the track peaking at its debut position of number 60 on the UK singles chart on 15 April 2006.

== Discography ==
=== Singles ===
- 2006: "WigWam"
