= Vindaloo (song) =

1998 single by Fat Les

Single by Fat Les
- Released: 8 June 1998
- Recorded: 1998
- Genre: Comedy; football chant; Britpop; novelty
- Length: 3:39
- Label: Telstar
- Songwriters: Keith Allen; Alex James; Guy Pratt

Fat Les singles chronology
"Vindaloo" (1998)	"Naughty Christmas (Goblin in the Office)" (1998)

"Vindaloo" is the debut single by British band Fat Les, released in 1998 and recorded for the 1998 FIFA World Cup. The music was co-written by Blur bassist Alex James and bassist Guy Pratt. The lyrics were written by comedian Keith Allen. The song was originally written as a parody of football chants, but was adopted as one in its own right and became a classic.

The song's name comes from the vindaloo, a type of very spicy Goan curry that is popular in the United Kingdom. Much of the song consists of the phrase "nah nah nah" and the word "vindaloo" repeated over and over by a mixed group, occasionally interspersed with lines such as "And we all like vindaloo" and "We're England; we're gonna score one more than you". The song has brief verses, spoken/sung by Keith Allen (in a voice sounding similar to that of Ian Dury) over a marching snare drum beat.

"Vindaloo" reached number two on the UK Singles Chart in June 1998; it was beaten to No. 1 by "3 Lions '98" by David Baddiel and Frank Skinner and Lightning Seeds, a re-recording of football anthem "Three Lions" from 1996 with slightly altered lyrics.

== Background ==
In March 1998, while discussing the forthcoming FIFA World Cup at the Groucho Club, Keith Allen and Alex James had the idea of creating an unofficial World Cup song. James thought that a drum beat he heard at a match at Craven Cottage would make a good football song, and they went to see Guy Pratt to write the song together, basing the melody on an established football chant. They also brought in a singer, Andy Kane, and they were later joined by artist Damien Hirst when they asked him to create artwork for them. They called the band Fat Les, named after a woman they knew.

The idea of using "vindaloo" in the lyrics came when they ordered a takeaway while writing the song, but when the pizza arrived, they craved a vindaloo instead. Allen reasoned that a standard Indian dish would be apt for the type of songs a "right-wing lout" hostile to Indians would like.

The line "Me and me Mum and me Dad and me Gran" was inspired by something Allen's son Alfie Allen said. The line "we're off to Waterloo" references the Eurostar service which ran from that station at the time.

== Music video ==
The music video for "Vindaloo" is a parody of the video for "Bitter Sweet Symphony" by The Verve, which was itself inspired by the music video for "Unfinished Sympathy" by Massive Attack. The video was recorded in the same street in Hoxton, London, and features comedian Paul Kaye as a Richard Ashcroft lookalike forcing his way down the pavement along the street. The video was recorded on Sunday 26th April 1998 - the same day as that year’s London Marathon - causing some of the celebrities to be ‘fashionably late’ to the filming, due to road closures in London.

Unlike the original video, in which Ashcroft is alone, Kaye gradually gathers a large crowd which includes Fat Les members Keith Allen, Alex James, and artist Damien Hirst, further on Rowland Rivron (as the drumming Queens guard), Edward Tudor-Pole, Matt Lucas and David Walliams (wearing Mash and Peas jumpers), comedian/actor Ricky Grover as a security guard, a group of children including Allen's young son and daughter Alfie and Lily, Malcolm Hardee, sumo wrestlers, French maids, a French mime artist, an Onion Johnny, Pearly Kings and Queens, a Max Wall lookalike (as Professor Wallofski), a priest, women dressed as girls from St Trinian's and many others who dance around him, some brandishing bags of curry. By the end, Kaye has joined in celebrating with the rest of the crowd.

When the song was performed on Top of the Pops, which was filmed at Elstree at the time, the band recreated the video by starting with a crowd on EastEnders' Albert Square before entering the TOTP studio.

== Reception ==
As the song has a chant-style metre, Vindaloo has been equated to a "hooligan's anthem". However, it has been praised for showing the multiculturalism of England by creating a post-modern national football anthem through the usage of a Goan/Portuguese dish; The Guardian called it an "irritating, pretentiously proletarian jape" because most of the lyrics are fairly nonsensical.

The BBC thought the band was being deliberately provocative referencing an earlier incident during The Late Show when band member Keith Allen got into an extremely heated row over British comedy being changed to appease political correctness. Before storming out of the live broadcast, Allen said to Asian writer Farrukh Dhondy "It's not a chip you've got on your shoulder, it's a fucking vindaloo!". He later claimed he used the term vindaloo due to its faux ethnicity (vindaloo from Goan cuisine actually originated from Portugal); he felt self-appointed spokespeople were appropriating the concerns of ethnic minorities for their own domestic agendas.

== Track listings ==
UK CD1

1. "Vindaloo" (radio edit)
2. "Vindaloo" (laughter mix)
3. "Vindaloo" (karaoke mix)

UK CD2

1. "Vindaloo" (radio edit)
2. "Vindaloosh" (cocktail mix)
3. "Vindaloo" (extended mix)
4. "Vindaloo" (video)

UK cassette single

1. "Vindaloo" (radio edit)
2. "Vindaloosh" (cocktail mix)
3. "Vindaloo" (laughter mix)

== Charts ==
=== Weekly charts ===
Chart (1998)	Peak position
Europe (Eurochart Hot 100)	15
Scottish Singles Sales (Official Charts)	7
UK Singles (Official Charts)	2

Chart (2010)	Peak position
UK Singles (Official Charts)	32

Chart (2021)	Peak position
UK Singles (Official Charts)	28

=== Year-end charts ===
Chart (1998)	Position
UK Singles (OCC)	24

== Certifications ==
Region	Certification	Certified units/sales
United Kingdom (BPI)	Platinum	600,000^{‡}
^{‡} Sales+streaming figures based on certification alone.

== Cover versions ==
- In 2021, Will Mellor recorded a charity version called "Vindaloo Two" with celebrities such as Paddy McGuinness, Leigh Francis, Danny Dyer and Bez from the Happy Mondays, in order to raise money for the NHS.
- B&Q use the music (with altered lyrics) to advertise their Tradepoint concession on their in store marketing.
