= The Great British Cheese Festival =

Food festival held in Wales

The Great British Cheese Festival, is a festival held in Wales (previously held in the South or West of England) on the last weekend of every September.

== History ==
The first annual event was held in 2000 in Oxfordshire, and was founded by Juliet Harbutt. Each year it is preceded by the British Cheese Awards, a ceremony which Harbutt created in 1994, judged by food experts and farmers, in which the best cheeses are awarded bronze, silver and gold medals.

All cheeses are tasted blind, and the winners can then display their awards during the public-attended festival. There are usually a variety of events at the festival such as seminars, masterclasses, and cheesemaking demonstrations.

The event moved to Cheltenham in Gloucestershire in 2005. In 2006 the Sunday of the weekend was cancelled at great cost after the venue experienced flooding, and the decision was made to return to Oxfordshire in 2007.

Early in 2008 the festival was sold to Cardiff Council; subsequently the event has been held in the grounds of Cardiff Castle in 2008, 2009, 2010, and 2011.

The 2012 Great British Cheese Festival was held at Cardiff Castle on Saturday, September 22, and Sunday, September 23.

In 2015, Harbutt returned to her native New Zealand.

== See also ==
Cooper's Hill Cheese-Rolling and Wake
