= Amicus (charity) =

Amicus ALJ
- Founded: 1992
- Type: Non-profit organisation
- Purpose: Advocacy, legal assistance, pro bono, access to justice
- Location: London, United Kingdom
- Region served: United States and worldwide
- Website: amicus-alj.org
- Formerly called: The Andrew Lee Jones Fund

Amicus is a legal non-profit organisation based in London, United Kingdom which helps secure freedom for those facing the death penalty in the United States.

The charity assists those facing capital trial and punishment around the world, particularly in the United States, by providing proper legal representation and raising awareness of potential abuses of defendants' rights.

Amicus was founded in 1992, in memory of Andrew Lee Jones - the Lifelines penpal of Jane Officer. Andrew was executed in the state of Louisiana in 1991.

== Mission statement ==
The charity's objectives are:

"To assist in the provision of legal representation for those awaiting capital trial and punishment in the US, or any other country, and to raise awareness of potential abuses of defendants’ rights."

== Main activities ==
Amicus focuses on a number of areas of activity: Internships, Training and Legal Education, Casework, Events, Membership and a Journal. In addition, the charity also hosts frequent charity social events including wine-tastings and academic panel discussions, often featuring prominent speakers.

=== Internships ===
US Internships:

Amicus places legal interns in pre-trial, appellate and research offices of capital defence attorneys throughout the US - it currently has 18 affiliate offices across 11 different states (including Florida, Texas and Georgia). Many US defender offices operate within severe funding constraints. As capital defenders face severe funding constraints, Amicus interns provide support and carry out work that may not be possible otherwise.

UK Internships

Occasionally, Amicus has volunteer internship opportunities in their London office. All positions require a minimum time commitment of 14 hours per week for three months. Amicus looks for individuals that are responsible, motivated and able to work on their own initiative. The ideal candidates will also be flexible, able to work as part of a small team and committed to human rights. They advertise vacancies on their website.

=== Training and legal education ===
A US Death Penalty training course, based in London, runs twice a year in March and October. These focus on drafting amicus curiae briefs, motions and international legal applications and training for conducting research on behalf of defence attorneys. The course is accredited for 21 Continuing Professional Development (CPD) points with the Law Society and the Bar Council. Speakers at previous include Sunny Jacobs and Peter Pringle (death row exonerees), Russell Stetler (National Mitigation Coordinator for the federal death penalty projects), George Kendall (U.S. Counsel specialising in capital, criminal and civil rights cases), Jennifer Merrigan (Capital Attorney and Mitigation Specialist), Raoul Schonemann and Jim Marcus (both clinical professors and co-directors of the Capital Punishment Clinic, University of Texas). In order to be eligible for Amicus internships in the US, individuals must have completed the training course within 3 years of their application.

Amicus collaborates with the Middle Temple Library to ensure that the public has access to US constitutional and capital punishment criminal texts. The Capital Punishment Collection, a collection of historical material, textbooks, reports and personal accounts from countries around the world that still retain the death penalty is housed alongside the Library's existing - the largest collection of US legal materials in London (founded in the 1920s), both of which can be found on the third floor of the library.

=== Casework ===
At the request of capital defence attorneys, Amicus has drafted amicus curiae briefs for a number of American courts, including the United States Supreme Court. Amicus case-workers also draft motions for use before and during trials and appeals, such as motions against the use of gruesome photographs. They also assist with drafting clemency statements and petitions in a number of states.

In addition, Amicus provides experienced lawyers to argue before international courts. The jurisdiction of the Privy Council in London means that they have argued many of the issues that relate to the death penalty in the US. Amicus lawyers have, in the past, argued cases before the United Nations Commission on Human Rights and drafted applications to the Inter-American Commission on Human Rights, headquartered in Washington DC. Amicus also provides trial observers to monitor the legal process in various jurisdictions around the world.

During 2011 Amicus had approximately 200 volunteers working on eight individual cases.

=== Events ===
Amicus holds events to raise awareness of the issues surrounding the application of the death penalty in the US. Since 2004, the charity has built on its existing events programme in London and Birmingham, holding a variety of regional events and activities in Manchester, Oxford, Newcastle and Leeds.

In November 2016, the charity held 'Art for Amicus' at Temple Church. It was both an exhibition and auction of paintings created by prisoners currently on death row in the U.S. There was also a performance from contemporary artist and performer Bob and Roberta Smith and a Q&A with prominent comedian Reginald D. Hunter.

Currently, Amicus is running a series of yoga sessions, 'Yoga for Ommmicus' in Middle Temple Lane run by yoga instructor and barrister Laura Phillips. The sessions are inspired by Sunny Jacobs, an exoneree who practised yoga whilst on death row.

=== Membership ===
One fundraising technique used by the charity is offering students and regular memberships. These offer various benefits, such as priority access to events and subscription to a journal.

==== Journal ====
The Amicus Journal is the leading reporter on the significant issues affecting capital punishment worldwide. It provides a forum for dialogue on issues concerning the death penalty and related topics. The journal includes articles written by academics and practitioners on current legal issues and on the death penalty, news from around the world, and reportage from Amicus interns in the US.

== Notable speakers and affiliates ==
=== Patrons ===
- Alistair Carmichael, (MP)
- Baroness Stern, CBE
- Benjamin Zephaniah, (poet and author)
- Claire van Kampen, (musical director, composer and playwright)
- David Rowntree, (musician and activist)
- Sir Mark Rylance, (director and actor)
- Peter Pringle, (death row exoneree, Co-Founder of the Sunny Center)
- Sister Helen Prejean, (C.S.J.)
- Sunny Jacobs, (death row exoneree, Co-Founder of the Sunny Centre)
- Susan Sarandon, (actress and activist)
- Wilbert Rideau, (former death row inmate, writer)
