= The Great Escape (Blur album) =

Studio album by Blur
- Released: 11 September 1995
- Studios: Maison Rouge and Townhouse, London
- Genre: Britpop
- Length: 56:56
- Labels: Food; Virgin
- Producer: Stephen Street

Blur chronology
Parklife (1994)	The Great Escape (1995)	Live at the Budokan (1996)

Singles from The Great Escape
- 1. "Country House" Released: 14 August 1995; 2. "The Universal" Released: 13 November 1995; 3. "Stereotypes" Released: 12 February 1996; 4. "Charmless Man" Released: 29 April 1996; 5. "It Could Be You" Released: 22 May 1996 (Japan only)

The Great Escape is the fourth studio album by the English rock band Blur. It was released on 11 September 1995 on Food and Virgin Records.

The album continued the band's run of hit singles, with "Country House", "The Universal", "Stereotypes" and "Charmless Man" reaching the top 10 of the UK singles chart. "Country House" was Blur's first song to reach number one, beating Oasis' "Roll with It", in a high-profile chart rivalry dubbed "the Battle of Britpop".

Released at the height of Britpop and the band's popularity in the UK, the album was a major commercial success in the UK and Europe, becoming the band's second consecutive album to debut at number one on the UK Albums Chart and being certified triple platinum in the UK in less than a year. The album received widespread critical acclaim upon its initial release, with praise for its songwriting and eclectic themes, though some retrospective reviews have been more negative, viewing it as a less cohesive, uninspired follow-up to Parklife (1994).

The Great Escape is often considered to be the final album of a trio of Britpop albums released by Blur in the mid-1990s, after Modern Life Is Rubbish (1993) and Parklife (1994). With Blur's 1997 self-titled album, the band would change direction and move away from Britpop in favour of a more lo-fi and alternative rock sound.

It was reissued in December 2025 as a two disc vinyl set for the album's 30th anniversary with new cover art by Tony Hung.

== Background and recording ==
=== Concept ===
On 17 June 1995, lead singer Damon Albarn and bassist Alex James spoke on BBC Radio 1 about coming up with a title for the album; "We've got until this Wednesday, our record company inform us, to come up with it", said Albarn. "We've been trying to get life into it, but nothing was very good – Wifelife, Darklife, Nextlife", added James.

The album is in the style of a concept album, that is, most of the songs are linked by a similar theme—loneliness and detachment. Albarn subsequently revealed that much of The Great Escape is about himself (e.g. "Dan Abnormal" is an anagram of "Damon Albarn").

=== Songs ===
"Mr. Robinson's Quango" was the first song recorded for the album and "It Could Be You" was the last, in May 1995. The title of the latter was taken from the original advertising slogan of the United Kingdom's multimillion-pound-prize National Lottery, which had drawn much public interest after its inception the previous year.

"Yuko and Hiro" was originally titled "Japanese Workers", and "The Universal" was first attempted during the Parklife sessions as a ska number. During the making of The Great Escape the song was resurrected by James, who notes in his autobiography, Bit of a Blur, that the band had almost given up on getting it to work when Albarn came up with the string section.

One song on the album, "Ernold Same", features then-MP Ken Livingstone. He is credited in the sleevenotes as "The Right-On" Ken Livingstone. Producer Stephen Street commented, "It was my idea to get him in because I’m not a huge fan of his. We needed somebody with a really nasal, boring voice doing the commentary and I suggested him. He came in thinking he was the bee’s knees and we were fans – we weren’t at all! (Laughs) I couldn’t stand him and my preconceptions were confirmed when he insulted the pastel jumper I was wearing that day! But his voice suited the song."

As with Blur's previous two albums, the liner notes also contain guitar chords for each of the songs along with the lyrics.

== Singles ==
The album spawned four hit singles for the band with "Country House", "The Universal", "Stereotypes" and "Charmless Man". "Stereotypes" made its debut at a secret gig at the Dublin Castle in London and was considered as the album's lead single, but "Country House" got a bigger reaction from fans. "Country House" gave the band their first number one single, beating Oasis to the top spot. "The Universal" and "Charmless Man" both reached the top 5, whilst "Stereotypes" peaked at number 7. In Japan, "It Could Be You" was released as a four-track single, featuring B-sides recorded live at the Budokan.

== Reception and legacy ==
Professional ratings
Initial reviews (in 1995)
Review scores
Source	Rating
The Guardian	4/5 stars
Los Angeles Times	3.5/4 stars
Melody Maker	12/10
NME	9/10
Q	5/5 stars
Select	5/5
Smash Hits	4/5 stars
Spin	6/10

Professional ratings
Retrospective reviews (after 1995)
Review scores
Source	Rating
AllMusic	4.5/5 stars
Pitchfork	8.2/10
The Rolling Stone Album Guide	4.5/5 stars

The Great Escape was initially met with widespread acclaim from critics. David Cavanagh in Select called it "a funny, brave and heartbroken record" that "has everything you could want", while NME reporter Johnny Cigarettes wrote: "The Great Escape is so rammed with tunes, ideas, emotions, humour, tragedy, farce, and edgy beauty that it's utterly beyond contemporary compare." Melody Maker's Paul Lester awarded the album an unconventional 12/10 and deemed it superior to celebrated predecessor Parklife, while noting that "Blur understand the geometry of the song, and the basic principles of pop, better than anyone today". In response to "album of the decade" claims from Melody Maker, J. D. Considine of The Baltimore Sun said: "The Great Escape may not be the defining work of the '90s, but it is the best Brit-rock release this year." Less enthused was Spin journalist Chuck Eddy, who felt the LP ranged from "wonderful" to "detached and emotionally stiff". The Great Escape was named as one of the 10 best records of 1995 in Melody Maker, NME, Q, Raw and Select. NME readers voted it the third-best album of the year.

Support from the music press soon tapered off, however, and The Great Escape gained many detractors. The greater commercial success of rival band Oasis is seen to have played a role in this revaluation; BBC Music writer James McMahon recalled how the "critical euphoria" surrounding the album lasted "about as long as it took publishers to realise Oasis would probably shift more magazines for them". Q would issue an apologia for its five-star review of the record, while Graeme McMillan in Time remarked that it lacks the "breadth and heart" of Parklife, feeling "cynical and uninspired in comparison". Drowned in Sound reporter Marc Burrows felt the LP had been overrated and then underrated, writing: "Reality is somewhere in between... The Great Escape reveals itself as flawed, melancholy, occasionally stunning and utterly bonkers." Other journalists retained an unapologetically favourable stance: the album was described by AllMusic editor Stephen Thomas Erlewine as "a vibrant, invigorating record" that "bristles with invention", while Brian Doan of PopMatters dubbed it a "masterpiece" whose content examines the costs of "trusting in stasis".

Damon Albarn has expressed distaste for the album in later interviews, describing it as "messy" and one of the two "bad records" he has made in his career (the other being Blur's debut album Leisure).

Select named the record the 34th-best of the 1990s, while Pitchfork placed it 70th. It was ranked by BuzzFeed as the sixth-best album of the Britpop era. The Great Escape also placed at number 725 in the 2000 edition of the book, All Time Top 1000 Albums. In October 2023, the Official Charts Company revealed that The Great Escape was the twenty-first most streamed album from the 1990s in the United Kingdom.

== Commercial performance ==
The Great Escape continued the commercial success of previous album Parklife. While the latter was more of a sleeper hit, The Great Escape registered strong first-week sales of 188,000. In its first year, the album sold 68,000 copies in the US. By late 1996 the album had sold approximately 600,000 units in continental Europe. According to Food managing director Andy Ross, it "comfortably outsold Parklife everywhere except the UK. The total figure was up 400,000 and the balance came mainly from Europe and Southeast Asia." Sales in France up to late November 1996 were 125,000 units, compared with 69,000 for Parklife. In Italy, sales were 83,000 compared with 16,000 for Parklife.

== Track listing ==
All tracks are written by Damon Albarn, Graham Coxon, Alex James, Dave Rowntree.

No.	Title	Length
1.	"Stereotypes"	3:10
2.	"Country House"	3:57
3.	"Best Days"	4:49
4.	"Charmless Man"	3:34
5.	"Fade Away"	4:19
6.	"Top Man"	4:00
7.	"The Universal"	3:58
8.	"Mr. Robinson's Quango"	4:02
9.	"He Thought of Cars"	4:15
10.	"It Could Be You"	3:14
11.	"Ernold Same"	2:07
12.	"Globe Alone"	2:23
13.	"Dan Abnormal"	3:24
14.	"Entertain Me"	4:19
15.	"Yuko and Hiro"	5:24
Total length:		56:56

- "Yuko and Hiro" ends at 3:50. After 30 seconds of silence, at 4:21 into "Yuko and Hiro" is a minute long instrumental reprise of "Ernold Same". Although officially untitled, it is sometimes erroneously referred to as "A World of Difference" because these words appear in a separate box below the track list in the booklet.

Japanese bonus tracks
No.	Title	Length
16.	"Ultranol"	2:41
17.	"No Monsters in Me"	5:14

Disc 2: Blur 21 2012 bonus material
No.	Title	Length
1.	"One Born Every Minute"	2:18
2.	"To the End (La Comedie)" (featuring Françoise Hardy)	5:05
3.	"Ultranol"	2:43
4.	"No Monsters in Me"	3:38
5.	"Entertain Me" (Live It!) (Remix)	7:17
6.	"The Man Who Left Himself"	3:22
7.	"Tame"	4:47
8.	"Ludwig"	2:24
9.	"The Horrors"	3:18
10.	"A Song"	1:45
11.	"St. Louis"	3:13
12.	"Country House" (Live at Mile End)	4:57
13.	"Girls & Boys" (Live at Mile End)	5:03
14.	"Parklife" (Live at Mile End)	3:43
15.	"For Tomorrow" (Live at Mile End)	7:02
16.	"Charmless Man" (Live at Budokan)	3:22
17.	"Chemical World" (Live at Budokan)	4:12
18.	"Eine kleine Lift Musik"	4:18
19.	"It Could Be You (Live at the Beeb)" (Japan bonus track)	3:07

Bonus track notes

- Tracks 1–2, 12–15 from the single "Country House", August 1995
- Tracks 3–5, 19 from the single "The Universal", November 1995
- Tracks 6–8 from the single "Stereotypes", February 1996
- Tracks 9–11 from the single "Charmless Man", April 1996
- Tracks 16–17 from the Japanese single "It Could Be You", May 1996
- Track 18 from the War Child compilation Help, September 1995

== Personnel ==
Blur

- Damon Albarn – lead vocals, piano, organ, synthesisers, handclaps
- Graham Coxon – electric & acoustic guitars, banjo, backing vocals, saxophone, handclaps
- Alex James – bass guitar, handclaps, backing vocals on "Top Man"
- Dave Rowntree – drums, handclaps, backing vocals on "Top Man"

Additional musicians

- The Kick Horns
  - Simon Clarke – saxophone
  - Tim Sanders – saxophone
  - J. Neil Sidwell – trombone
  - Roddy Lorimer – trumpet
- The Duke String Quartet
  - Louise Fuller – violin
  - Rick Koster – violin
  - John Metcalfe – viola
  - Ivan McCermoy – cello
- Ken Livingstone – narration on "Ernold Same"
- Teresa Jane Davis – backing vocals on "The Universal"
- Angela Murrell – backing vocals on "The Universal"
- Cathy Gillat – backing vocals on "Yuko and Hiro"
- Stephen Street – handclaps

Technical personnel

- Stephen Street – production
- John Smith – engineering
- Tom Girling – engineering assistance
- Julie Gardner – engineering assistance
- Tom King – cover photography
- Nels Israelson – band photography

== Charts ==
=== Weekly charts ===
Chart (1995)	Peak position
Australian Albums (ARIA)	10
Austrian Albums (Ö3 Austria)	21
Belgian Albums (Ultratop Flanders)	28
Belgian Albums (Ultratop Wallonia)	22
Canada Top Albums/CDs (RPM)	24
Danish Albums (Hitlisten)	10
Dutch Albums (Album Top 100)	28
Estonian Albums (Eesti Top 10)	8
European Albums (Music & Media)	2
Finnish Albums (Suomen virallinen lista)	5
French Albums (SNEP)	14
German Albums (Offizielle Top 100)	35
Icelandic Albums (Tónlist)	1
Irish Albums (IRMA)	1
Italian Albums (FIMI)	15
Japanese Albums (Oricon)	5
New Zealand Albums (RMNZ)	7
Norwegian Albums (VG-lista)	5
Spanish Albums (AFYPE)	8
Swedish Albums (Sverigetopplistan)	2
Swiss Albums (Schweizer Hitparade)	26
UK Albums (Official Charts)	1
US Billboard 200	150

=== Year-end charts ===
Chart (1995)	Position
European Albums (Music & Media)	61
Swedish Albums & Compilations (Sverigetopplistan)	55
UK Albums (OCC)	10

Chart (1996)	Position
UK Albums (OCC)	76

== Certifications ==
Region	Certification	Certified units/sales
Canada (Music Canada)	Gold	50,000^{^}
France (SNEP)	Gold	100,000^{*}
Ireland (IRMA)	2× Platinum	33,000
Japan (RIAJ)	Gold	100,000^{^}
Norway (IFPI Norway)	Gold	25,000^{*}
Spain (Promusicae)	Platinum	100,000^{^}
Sweden (GLF)	Gold	50,000^{^}
United Kingdom (BPI)	3× Platinum	901,349
Summaries
Europe (IFPI)	Platinum	1,000,000^{*}
^{*} Sales figures based on certification alone.^{^} Shipments figures based on certification alone.
