= Blur (Blur album) =

Studio album by Blur
- Released: 10 February 1997
- Recorded: June–November 1996
- Studios: Grettisgötu, Reykjavík; Mayfair, London
- Genres: Indie rock; lo-fi; alternative rock; art rock
- Length: 56:53
- Label: Food
- Producers: Stephen Street; Blur

Blur chronology
Live at the Budokan (1996)	Blur (1997)	Bustin' + Dronin' (1998)

Singles from Blur
- 1. "Beetlebum" Released: 16 January 1997; 2. "Song 2" Released: 7 April 1997; 3. "On Your Own" Released: 16 June 1997; 4. "M.O.R." Released: 15 September 1997

Blur is the fifth studio album by the English rock band Blur, released on 10 February 1997 by Food Records. Blur had previously been broadly critical of American popular culture and their previous albums had become associated with the Britpop movement, particularly Parklife, which had helped them become one of Britain's leading pop acts. After their previous album, The Great Escape, the band faced media backlash and relationships between the members became strained.

Under the suggestion of the band's guitarist, Graham Coxon, the band underwent a stylistic change, becoming influenced by American indie rock bands such as Pavement. Recording took place in London as well as in Reykjavík, Iceland. Drummer Dave Rowntree described the music on the album as being more aggressive and emotional than their previous work. Producer Stephen Street claimed that lead singer-songwriter Damon Albarn had started writing about more personal experiences while Coxon revealed that listening to Albarn's lyrics it became clear to him that "he'd obviously gone off his head a bit more".

Despite worries from Blur's label, EMI, and the music press that the change in style would alienate the band's predominantly teenage fanbase and that the album would flop as a result, Blur, as well as lead single, "Beetlebum", reached the top of the UK charts and the album was certified platinum. The album also reached the top 20 in six other countries. The success of "Song 2" led to Blur becoming the band's most successful album in the US where the Britpop scene had been largely unsuccessful. The album received positive reviews from most music critics, many praising the stylistic change as well as Albarn's songwriting. This is the last album to feature longtime producer Stephen Street, until his return for The Magic Whip (2015).

== Background ==
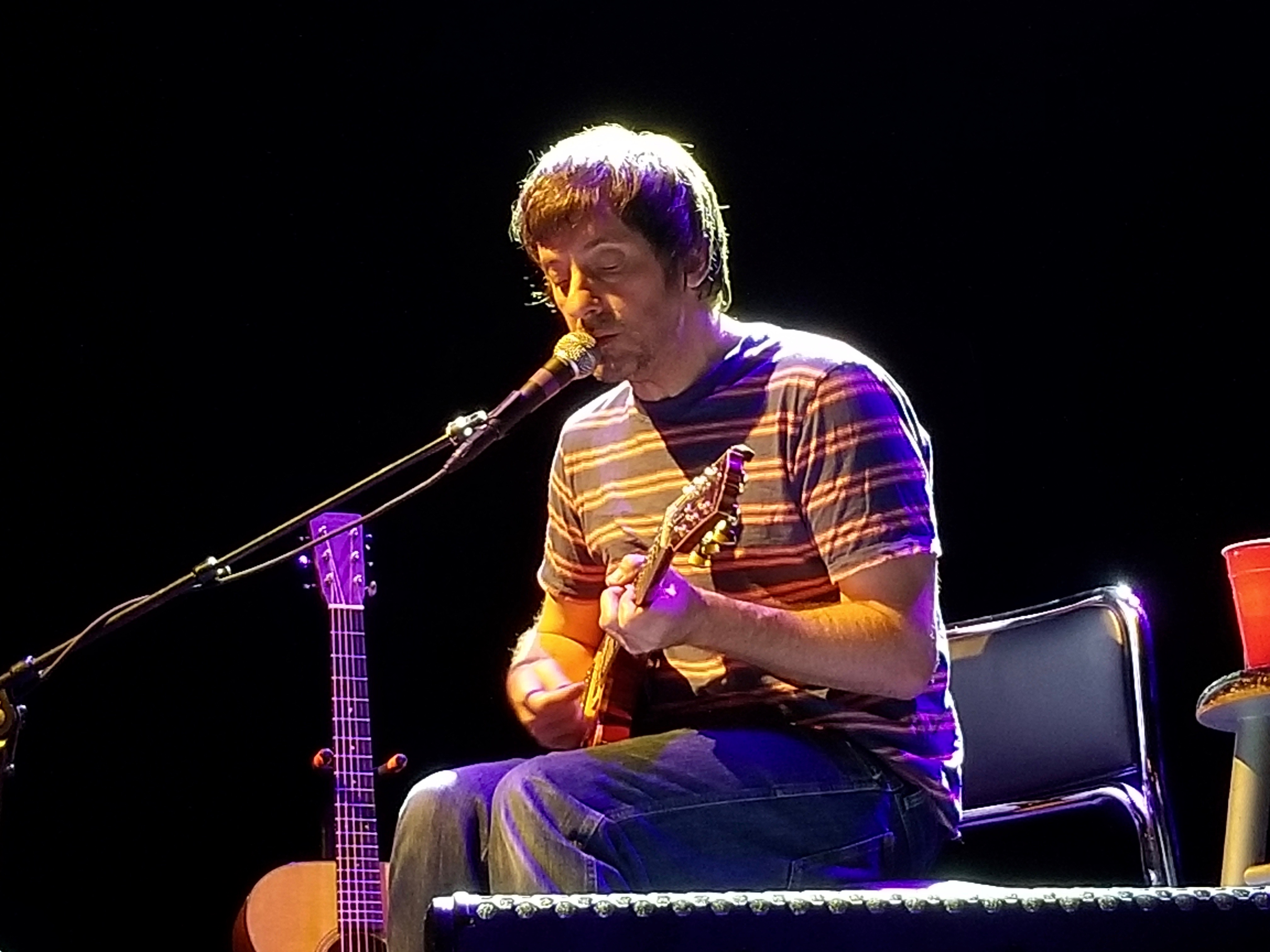
Graham Coxon described himself as going through a "mid pop life crisis" and longed for the band to write music "that scared people again".

Despite Blur's previous album, The Great Escape, being released to positive reviews, and entering the UK charts at number one, the album's success was left in the shadows compared to (What's the Story) Morning Glory? by Britpop rivals Oasis which went quadruple platinum in the US. Blur became perceived as an "inauthentic middle class pop band" in comparison to the "working class heroes" Oasis, which made lead singer-songwriter Damon Albarn feel "stupid and confused". Bassist Alex James later summarised, "After being the People's Hero, Damon was the People's Prick for a short period ... basically, he was a loser—very publicly."

An early 1996 Q magazine interview revealed that relations between Blur members had become very strained; journalist Adrian Deevoy wrote that he found them "on the verge of a nervous breakup". Guitarist Graham Coxon, in particular, began to resent his bandmates; James for his playboy lifestyle and Albarn for his control over Blur's musical direction and public image. In February 1996, when Coxon and James were absent for a lip-synced Blur performance broadcast on Italian television, they were replaced by a cardboard cutout and a roadie, respectively. Blur biographer Stuart Maconie later wrote that, at the time, "Blur were sewn together very awkwardly."

Coxon struggled with drinking problems and, in a rejection of the group's former Britpop aesthetic, made a point of listening to noisy American alternative rock bands such as Pavement. In the 2010 documentary on the band, No Distance Left to Run, Coxon stated that he was getting more influenced by American guitarists as "a lot of them were doing very interesting stuff with guitars and I needed to be nourished I suppose as a guitar player and there was none of that happening in English music although English music was now more popular [so] I started listening to more stuff from the States from smaller labels."

Although he had previously dismissed it, Albarn grew to appreciate Coxon's tastes in lo-fi and underground music, and recognised the need to significantly change Blur's musical direction once again. "I can sit at my piano and write brilliant observational pop songs all day long but you've got to move on", he said. He subsequently approached Street, and argued for a more stripped-down sound on the band's next record. Coxon, recognising his own personal need to, as drummer Dave Rowntree put it, "work this band", wrote a letter to Albarn, describing his desire for their music "to scare people again".

== Recording ==
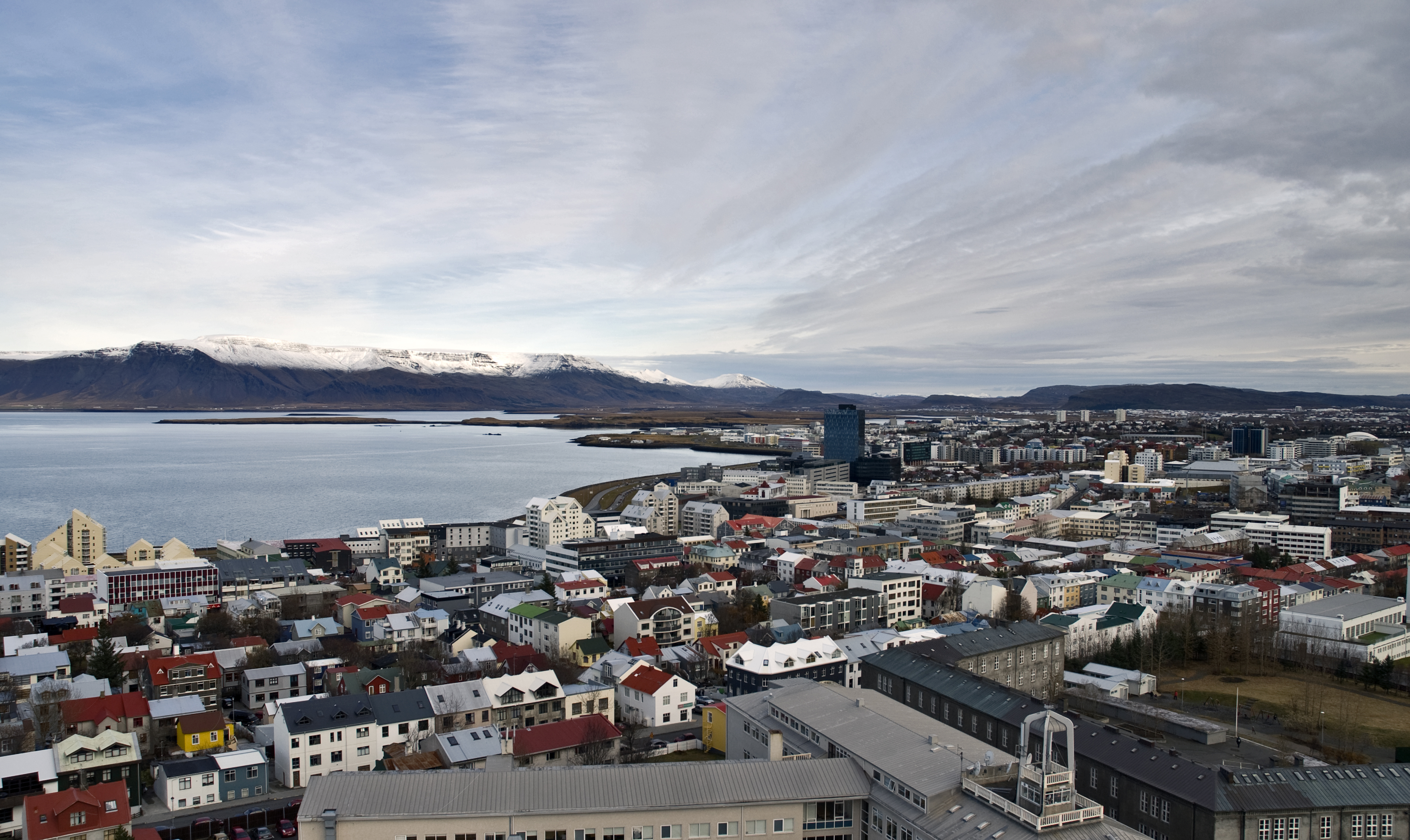
The album was partially recorded in Reykjavík, Iceland.

Recording sessions for the album started in June 1996 at Mayfair studios in London. After the initial sessions, the band left to record the rest of the album in Reykjavík, Iceland, away from the Britpop scene. It was in Iceland that the vocals to "Strange News from Another Star", "Essex Dogs", "Beetlebum", and "On Your Own" were recorded. "We just recorded some vocals there," Albarn revealed in an Addicted to Noise interview. "I have a house there and it's the perfect place to write because of the light [The sun doesn't rise until midday]. Not good during the summer because it's sunshine all the time, 24 hours a day."

Apart from a change in musical style, the band changed the way they recorded. "It was the first time we sort of jammed," Coxon revealed. "We've never really jammed before. We've been quite white-coaty, overall about recording, like in a laboratory. Yeah, we did actually feel our way through just playing whatever came to our minds and editing, which was really exciting." "We just played together for two weeks in a way we hadn't done since 1991," Rowntree recalled. "We wanted to purify the sound, to not have anything there not played by us. We reasoned that if we made small changes at the input end, we could effect large changes in the output." According to producer Stephen Street, "Blur had decided that commercial pressures and writing hit singles wasn't going to be the main consideration any more. The mood in the studio was very different to when I'd first worked with them." "In the studio, once we got past those first few days, where I felt everyone was treading on eggshells, there was a great atmosphere. I think it was because they didn't want to be competing with anyone on this record, they wanted to make a record that would help keep the band together." Street had acquired a new piece of hardware, described as "muso-ish to talk about but really useful" that enabled him to sample loops and otherwise cut-and-paste entire sections of the band's jam sessions.

== Music ==
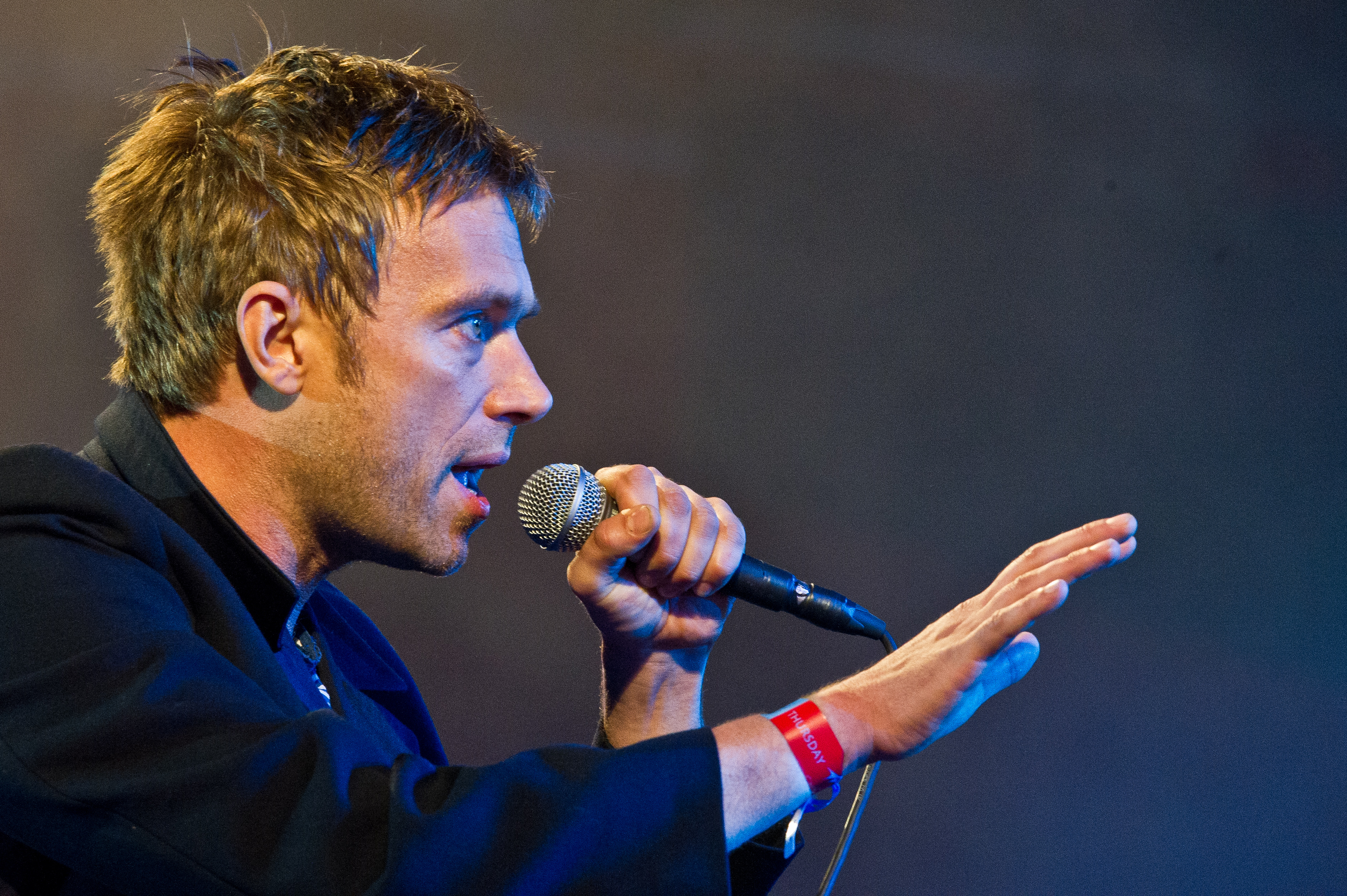
Damon Albarn pursued more personal songwriting rather than writing about characters.

Rowntree stated that the band decided to give Coxon a much freer hand on Blur. Street also observed a change of Albarn's writing style, as he "was much more prepared to write in the first person, rather than about interesting characters. I think [Albarn had] grown a bit and was prepared to start writing about his own experiences rather than transposing them on to a character like Tracy Jacks or Dan Abnormal." Coxon agreed, and felt "Damon's songs were revealing more to me than to him" and said that when he heard some of his home demos he realised "he'd obviously gone off his head a bit more". The album features the first song to appear on a studio album for which Coxon not only wrote the lyrics, but also sang lead vocal: "You're So Great".

According to Mark Redfern of Under the Radar, Blur eschewed Britpop in favour of American indie rock. NME magazine similarly argued that it favoured lo-fi and alternative rock over Britpop. By contrast, Margaret Moser of The Austin Chronicle characterised its music as "a punchy brand of muscular Brit-pop", while AllMusic's Stephen Thomas Erlewine said it "may superficially appear to be a break from tradition", but is a "logical progression" from Britpop, rather than an abandonment of it. In congruence, music critic Jim DeRogatis assessed that the album "introduced elements of American indie rock to the band’s veddy English sound."

Album opener "Beetlebum" has been described as a "Beatles tribute" by several publications; Erlewine wrote that the song "[runs] through the White Album in the space of five minutes." Q magazine's Andrew Collins compared the song to The Auteurs, as well as a "slightly menacing Free as a Bird", due to "a slight drone undulating in the foreground" and a "sweet, elongated coda busied by what sounds like an invasion of turkeys." Albarn admitted that "Beetlebum" was about heroin and the drug experiences he had with his then-girlfriend, Justine Frischmann of Elastica. He also stated that the song describes a complicated emotion, sort of "sleepy" and sort of "sexy". The song's title alludes to the phrase "chasing the beetle", a variation of the phrase, "chasing the dragon", which refers to inhaling the smoke from heated heroin, morphine, or opium that has been placed on a piece of tin-foil. "Song 2" is notable for its hook, which features Albarn yelling "woo-hoo!" The song's intro has been called Coxon's "finest moment".

"Song 2"
Sample of "Song 2" from Blur. Inspired by lo-fi and American indie rock, "Song 2" was a hit in the US.

"Strange News From Another Star"
Sample of "Strange News From Another Star" from Blur. Andrew Collins of Q described the song as "Blur's Space Oddity" and wrote that the lyrics "[express] further doubt from the troubled [Damon] Albarn."

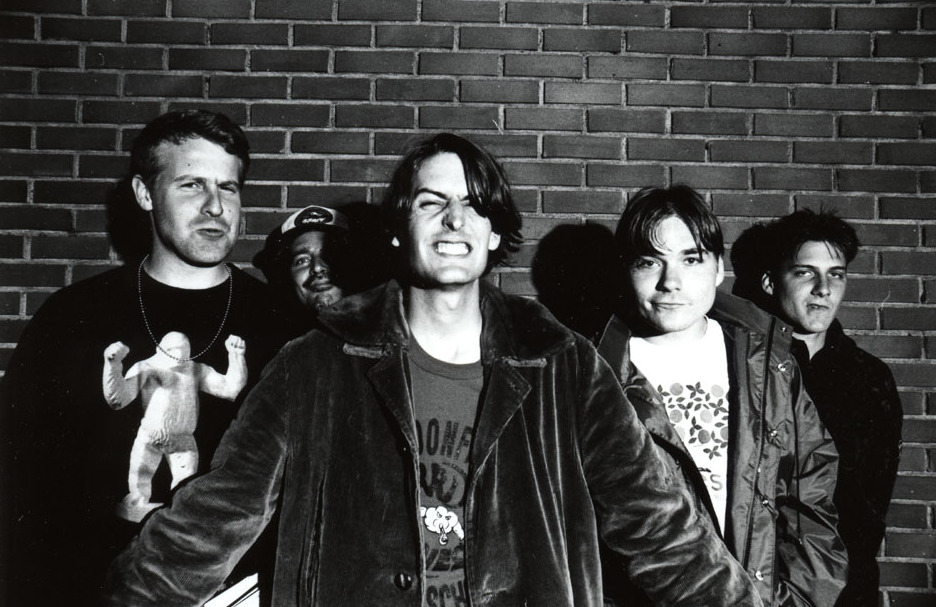
Blur's sound and aesthetic was inspired by American indie rock bands such as Pavement.

Erlewine described "Country Sad Ballad Man" as "bizarrely affecting, strangled lo-fi psychedelia", whilst Collins claimed that "the seated intro is a rustic mess from which arises a simply beautiful, lazy riff." "M.O.R." was described by James Hunter of Rolling Stone as a homage to Mott the Hoople. The song borrows the chord progression from David Bowie's "Boys Keep Swinging" and "Fantastic Voyage", the latter of which was co-written by Brian Eno. "On Your Own" is notable for its usage of a Roland TR-606 Drumatix, a 1980s drum machine. Erlewine described the song as "an incredible slice of singalong pop spiked with winding, fluid guitar and synth eruptions." "There's a terrace singalong in here somewhere", Collins claimed, "undermined by its indistinct drum sound". "Theme from Retro" was described as "obligatory space-rock trip-hop" by The Austin Chronicle, whilst Collins claimed that it "presents Blur in dub", referring to it as "an unyielding, lovely row. Like, say, a Blur B-side." "You're So Great", performed only by Coxon, was described by Collins as "the most American of all", as "[Coxon's] voice—faraway badly recorded, wavering but heartfelt—belongs to anyone but Old Blur." Tom Sinclair of Entertainment Weekly described the song as recalling the "whacked-out plangency of Midwestern lo-fi heroes Guided By Voices".

Lindsay Zoladz's review of the album (as part of Blur 21) for Pitchfork claimed that "Death of a Party" is the album's highlight, speculating that it influenced Gorillaz—another musical project that features Albarn as the chief songwriter. Collins claimed that it sounded like Blur's "second homage" to The Specials' "Ghost Town", speculating that the lyrics "Why did we bother? / Should've stayed away" reflected Blur's recent withdrawal from the public eye (though the song was written years earlier), and summarised the track as "a genuinely creepy piece". Sinclair described "Chinese Bombs" as sounding like a "Lower East Side mosh-pit den", while Zoladz felt that "I'm Just a Killer for Your Love" was "exquisitely bleary-eyed". In "Look Inside America", Albarn recalls the band waking up from a previous night's show, swigging Pepsi to find the energy to do a local TV show. Hunter called the song a "classic '90s road ballad". The song contains the refrain "Look inside America, she's all right; she's all right," which was said by Erlewine to "cleverly subvert the traditional Blur song, complete with strings." Collins described "Strange News from Another Star" as "Blur's Space Oddity", stating that the "acoustic guitar, quiet intro, nutty mood-change into a darker passage [and] a melancholy report whose central thrust ("I don't believe in me") [express] further doubt from the troubled Albarn." Originally performed as a poem at the Albert Hall in July 1996, the studio version of "Essex Dogs" was described by Erlewine as a "six-minute slab of free verse and rattling guitar noise." Collins revealed that "here it's set to a starter-motor riff so berserk even its author, Coxon, confesses to find it hard to listen to", and also described it as "a fitting ending (all eight exploratory minutes of it) to a challenging, barbed masterwork." The song is followed by "Interlude", a hidden track that was described by Collins as "a distressed instrumental sign-off that goes nowhere".

In a November 1996 video interview, Rowntree claimed, "It's a much more aggressive record in many ways as well as a more emotional record. I think the music we're making now is the music that we've always wanted to make but got distracted from in a way."

== Artwork and packaging ==
The artwork for Blur, as well the album's associated singles, was designed by design company Yacht Associates, which consists of Chris Thomson and Richard Bull. The pair had also been involved in the design process for Blur's previous album covers as part of Stylorouge. The cover art depicts a patient being rushed into an emergency ward. Searching for an image that conveyed "both optimism and scariness", Yacht Associates chose the stock photo (by photographer Scott Goldsmith) from Tony Stone Images, describing it as "an anaesthetic dream". In 1001 Albums You Must Hear Before You Die, reviewer Mark Bennett speculates that the cover art represented the band's critical status prior to the album.

The back cover and inside sleeve by Paul Postle depict sulphur fields in Iceland, where much of the album was recorded. Postle also took photos of the band rehearsing for the gatefold. Blur is also the group's first album not to have lyrics printed in the liner notes, instead having a composite photo of the band in the studio spread out over three panels. When questioned on this decision, Albarn revealed they "didn't wanna have to go through explaining what the lyrics are about because they're quite odd to explain," although he stated that "'Death of a Party' and 'Strange News From Another Star' are [both] pretty clear."

== Release and promotion ==
The music press predicted that the lo-fi sonic experimentation would alienate Blur's fanbase. These fears were also shared by James, who revealed that the front rows of the gigs that the band were performing at during the Britpop years were primarily attracting 15-year-old girls, and that he thought the change in style was a "fucking big balls move". Andy Ross, who was running Food Records at the time, admitted that when he first heard the album, he was "taken aback. We'd won Brits, we'd won two consecutive Q magazine Albums of the Year and my initial reaction was it's awkward and difficult. My immediate reaction was will you sell as many records? Where's my royalties? Everyone's first reaction to it was that it was a departure: that's clear from the artwork onwards." Albarn dismissed EMI's concerns, calling them "The usual thing—'It's got no singles on it'. Meanwhile, they're giving Radiohead the full marketing works. That hurt for a while because we've done so well for them. We were trying to be really brave. But it was all made up pretty quickly." Parlophone MD Tony Wadsworth was enthusiastic, however, as Coxon recalls: "We played him 'Song 2' as a bit of a test of whether he was on our wavelength. We told him this was the second single. Course, we had no idea that it would be. He sat there, grinning—'Definitely! Definitely a single!'"

Worries of "commercial suicide" were eased when the lead single, "Beetlebum", debuted at number one on the UK Singles Chart. Blur topped the UK Albums Chart when it was released in February, knocking White on Blonde by Texas off the top spot. The album eventually went on to be certified Platinum. Although the album could not match the sales of their previous albums in the UK, Blur became the band's most successful internationally, reaching the top twenty in Switzerland, France, and Norway. In the US, the album peaked at number sixty-one on the Billboard 200, making it Blur's highest-charting album at the time, and was certified gold. The album's US success has been attributed partially to the popularity of "Song 2", which peaked at number six on the Modern Rock chart. After "Song 2" was licensed for use in soundtracks, advertisements and television shows, it became the most-recognisable Blur song in the US. Following the success of Blur, the band embarked on a nine-month world tour.

== Critical reception ==
Professional ratings
Review scores
Source	Rating
AllMusic	4.5/5 stars
Chicago Tribune	3.5/4 stars
Entertainment Weekly	B+
The Guardian	4/5 stars
NME	7/10
Pitchfork	8.1/10
Q	4/5 stars
Rolling Stone	4/5 stars
Select	4/5
Spin	7/10

Blur received generally positive reviews from music critics in the United States, but reviews were mixed in the UK press. The Guardian praised it, whereas The Times was more ambivalent, and The Independent was negative. Stephen Thomas Erlewine of AllMusic said the album highlights "the band's rich eclecticism and sense of songcraft. Certainly, they are trying for new sonic territory, bringing in shards of white noise, gurgling electronics, raw guitars, and druggy psychedelia, but these are just extensions of previously hidden elements of Blur's music." Margaret Moser of The Austin Chronicle praised the album for "unveiling a punchy brand of muscular Brit-pop that dances around raucous, Kinks-like garage-pop ('Movin' On', 'M.O.R.'), tender, Beatles-like harmonies ('Beetlebum', 'Look Inside America'), punky quirk ('Chinese Bombs'), soulful balladry ('Country Sad Ballad Man'), obligatory space-rock trip-hop ('Theme from Retro', 'I'm Just a Killer for Your Love'), and a raise-yer-mug singalong ('On Your Own')." Jonathan Bernstein of Spin also felt that, "despite their traitorous pronouncements, Blur's highlights are consistently British-bred." James Hunter, writing for Rolling Stone, claimed that "what still makes [Blur] great is their deep grasp of style and genre. What they haven't done on Blur is roll out of bed, strum a few chords and loudly free-associate about the first thing that pops into their heads. This is a record that inhabits current American rock biases as cogently and intelligently as Parklife corralled the last few decades of British rock."

Many praised lyrics such as those in "Look Inside America", and, noting Albarn's "obligatory nod to Beck, [and promotion of] the new Pavement album as if paid to do so", reviewers felt the band had come to accept American values during this time—an about-face of their attitude during the Britpop years. Erlewine wrote that "Blur might be self-consciously eclectic, but Blur are at their best when they are trying to live up to their own pretensions, because of Damon Albarn's exceptional sense of songcraft and the band's knack for detailed arrangements that flesh out the songs to their fullest." Alternative Press called the album "a whirl of weird esotericism, precious, precocious and impressively powerful. Robert Christgau of The Village Voice was less enthusiastic, and cited only "Song 2" as a "choice cut", indicating "a good song on an album that isn't worth your time or money". However, there was strong praise from the Pittsburgh Post-Gazette, who awarded the album four out of four stars. Ed Masley wrote that "you can hear the new infatuation with indie rock stylings all over the latest release, with its clattering sonic collages and transistor radio vocals. At times, it's as though they've forgot that they're British. They are British though. It's what makes this eponymous record their greatest."

At the 1998 NME Awards, Blur received a nomination for Best Album, but it lost to Radiohead's OK Computer. In 2013, NME ranked it at number 137 in its list of the 500 Greatest Albums of All Time. The album was also included in the book 1001 Albums You Must Hear Before You Die. Q writer Tom Doyle reflected that, with Blur, "it appeared to have dawned on [the band] that as long as they had three or four decent singles, the remainder of an album could become a playground for their art rock imaginations", a development he said paved the way for 13 (1999).

Unlike some of Blur's previous albums, praise from the band members for Blur has remained. "I'm really fond of that record," Coxon said in 2009. "I think it's one of our best."

== Track listing ==
All lyrics by Damon Albarn, except "You're So Great" (written by Graham Coxon).

All music by Albarn, Coxon, Alex James, and Dave Rowntree, except "M.O.R." (written by Albarn, Coxon, James, Rowntree, David Bowie, and Brian Eno) and "You're So Great" (written by Coxon).

1997 UK release
No.	Title	Length
1.	"Beetlebum"	5:04
2.	"Song 2"	2:02
3.	"Country Sad Ballad Man"	4:50
4.	"M.O.R."	3:27
5.	"On Your Own"	4:26
6.	"Theme from Retro"	3:37
7.	"You're So Great"	3:35
8.	"Death of a Party"	4:33
9.	"Chinese Bombs"	1:24
10.	"I'm Just a Killer for Your Love"	4:11
11.	"Look Inside America"	3:50
12.	"Strange News from Another Star"	4:02
13.	"Movin' On"	3:44
14.	"Essex Dogs" (includes hidden tracks (Note: "Essex Dogs" includes the track "Interlude" which appears as a track 15 on some releases. The length of track 14 on the American version of the album is 11:24, with "Dancehall" as a hidden track in between "Essex Dogs" and "Interlude". The Japanese version of the album has "Dancehall" as a separate, listed track (15), which includes "Interlude". On the 2012 Special Edition, "Dancehall" is a distinct bonus track.))	8:08
Total length:		56:53

Notes

- The European version of the original release came with a live CD recorded in the Netherlands (also with selected b-sides from the Blur singles) that was also released separately in The Netherlands as simply "Blur Live E.P."
- The Australian version of the original release came with a second CD featuring the complete Peel Acres sessions (as released in the UK on the "On Your Own" singles).

2012 special edition Disc 2: Bonus tracks
No.	Title	Length
1.	"All Your Life"	4:12
2.	"A Spell (For Money)"	3:30
3.	"Woodpigeon Song"	1:43
4.	"Dancehall"	3:11
5.	"Get out of Cities"	4:03
6.	"Polished Stone"	2:43
7.	"Bustin' and Dronin'"	6:32
8.	"M.O.R." (road version)	3:02
9.	"Swallows in the Heatwave"	2:33
10.	"Death of a Party" (7" remix; remixed by Adrian Sherwood and Simon Mundy)	4:19
11.	"Cowboy Song"	4:07
12.	"Beetlebum" (live acoustic version)	4:34
13.	"On Your Own" (live acoustic version)	4:11
14.	"Country Sad Ballad Man" (live acoustic version)	4:44
15.	"This Is a Low" (live acoustic version)	3:32
16.	"M.O.R." (live in Utrecht)	3:18
17.	"Death of a Party" (live in Utrecht)	4:16
18.	"Song 2" (live in Utrecht)	2:07

Japanese edition bonus track
No.	Title	Length
19.	"Movin' On" (Mario Caldato Jr Mix)	3:45

Bonus track notes

- Tracks 1–4 from the single "Beetlebum", January 1997
- Tracks 5–7, 13–14 from the single "Song 2", April 1997
- Tracks 8–9 from the single "M.O.R.", September 1997
- Track 10 from the UK promotional single "Death of a Party", 1997
- Track 11 from "Dead Man on Campus (Music from the Motion Picture)", 1998

== Personnel ==
Blur

- Damon Albarn – lead vocals, piano, keyboards, Hammond organ, acoustic guitar
- Graham Coxon – electric and acoustic guitars, backing vocals, vocals on "You're So Great", theremin, additional drums on "Song 2" and "Strange News from Another Star"
- Alex James – bass guitar
- Dave Rowntree – drums, percussion, drum programming on "On Your Own"

Technical personnel

- Stephen Street – producer (except "I'm Just a Killer for Your Love")
- John Smith – engineer (except "I'm Just a Killer for Your Love")
- Blur – producer ("I'm Just a Killer for Your Love")
- Jason Cox – engineer ("I'm Just a Killer for Your Love")
- Arnþór "Addi 800" Örlygsson – additional engineering

== Charts ==
=== Weekly charts ===
Weekly chart performance for Blur
Chart (1997)	Peak position
Australian Albums (ARIA)	22
Austrian Albums (Ö3 Austria)	21
Belgian Albums (Ultratop Flanders)	25
Belgian Albums (Ultratop Wallonia)	12
Canada Top Albums/CDs (RPM)	26
Danish Albums (Hitlisten)	12
Dutch Albums (Album Top 100)	49
Estonian Albums (Eesti Top 10)	9
European Albums (Music & Media)	5
Finnish Albums (Suomen virallinen lista)	8
French Albums (SNEP)	12
German Albums (Offizielle Top 100)	23
Icelandic Albums (Tónlist)	1
Irish Albums (IRMA)	1
Italian Albums (FIMI)	7
Japanese Albums (Oricon)	7
New Zealand Albums (RMNZ)	3
Norwegian Albums (VG-lista)	6
Spanish Albums (AFYVE)	6
Swedish Albums (Sverigetopplistan)	4
Swiss Albums (Schweizer Hitparade)	17
UK Albums (Official Charts)	1
US Billboard 200	61

=== Year-end charts ===
1997 year-end chart performance for Blur
Chart (1997)	Position
Australian Albums (ARIA)	84
Belgian Albums (Ultratop Wallonia)	89
Canadian Albums (Nielsen Soundscan)	75
European Albums (Music & Media)	47
New Zealand Albums (RMNZ)	23
Spanish Albums (AFYPE)	47
UK Albums (OCC)	29
US Billboard 200	174

1998 year-end chart performance for Blur
Chart (1998)	Position
UK Albums (OCC)	110

== Certifications ==
Certifications for Blur
Region	Certification	Certified units/sales
Australia (ARIA)	Gold	35,000^{^}
Canada (Music Canada)	Platinum	100,000^{^}
Denmark (IFPI Danmark)	Gold	25,000^{^}
Japan (RIAJ)	Platinum	200,000^{^}
New Zealand (RMNZ)	Platinum	15,000^{^}
Spain (Promusicae)	Platinum	100,000^{^}
United Kingdom (BPI)	Platinum	300,000^{^}
United States (RIAA)	Gold	679,000
Summaries
Europe (IFPI)	Platinum	1,000,000^{*}
^{*} Sales figures based on certification alone.^{^} Shipments figures based on certification alone.
