= Dave Rowntree =

English musician (born 1964)

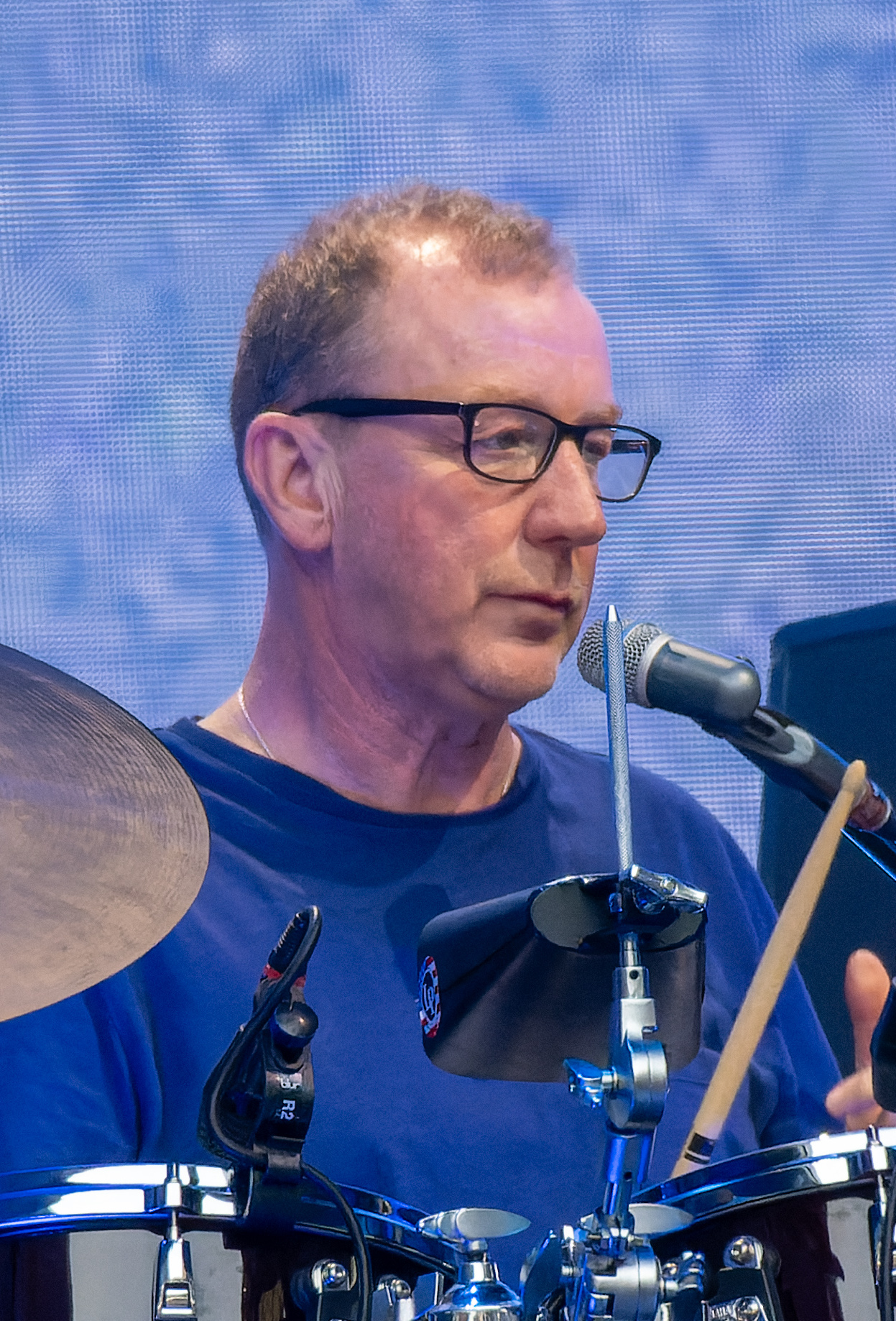
- Rowntree with Blur at Wembley Stadium in 2023
- Born: David Alexander De Horne Rowntree; 8 May 1964 (age 62); Colchester, Essex, England
- Occupations: Musician; animator; solicitor; composer; politician; DJ; pilot
- Political party: Labour
- Spouse: Paola Marra (m. 1994, divorced)
- Musical career
- Genres: Rock; Britpop
- Instruments: Drums; percussion
- Years active: 1988–present
- Label: Cooking Vinyl
- Member of: Blur
- Formerly of: The Ailerons
- Website: davidrowntree.org daverowntreecomposer.com

David Alexander De Horne Rowntree (born 8 May 1964) is an English musician, politician, lawyer, composer and animator. He is best known as the drummer for the rock band Blur.

In his political career, Rowntree served on the Norfolk County Council from 2017 to 2021 representing the Labour Party, and unsuccessfully stood for Parliament as a Labour candidate in the 2010 and 2024 general elections.

== Early life ==
David Alexander De Horne Rowntree was born in Colchester, Essex, at Colchester Maternity Hospital on 8 May 1964, to musical parents – Susan, a viola player, and John, a sound engineer at the BBC. He has an elder sister named Sara. De Horne was his family's original surname, inherited from his father's Huguenot ancestry. "When they settled in Yorkshire, the surname Rowntree was as common as Smith, so they changed ours to blend in," Rowntree explained in a 2023 interview.

Rowntree attended The Gilberd School in Colchester during the week, and the Landermere Music School, Thorpe-le-Soken, at weekends, where he studied percussion. He played percussion with his father in the Colchester Silver Band, a brass band. After leaving school he studied for a Higher National Diploma (HND) in Computer Science at Thames Polytechnic, and started his career as a computer programmer for Colchester Borough Council.

In a 2026 interview, Rowntree described his childhood as growing up in a "turbulent, dangerous household". He said "I never knew what would happen next. One family member was an alcoholic, another a drug addict and dealer. The front door might be kicked in by rival dealers. It was chaos, and I got out of the house as often as possible."

== Music career ==
=== Blur ===
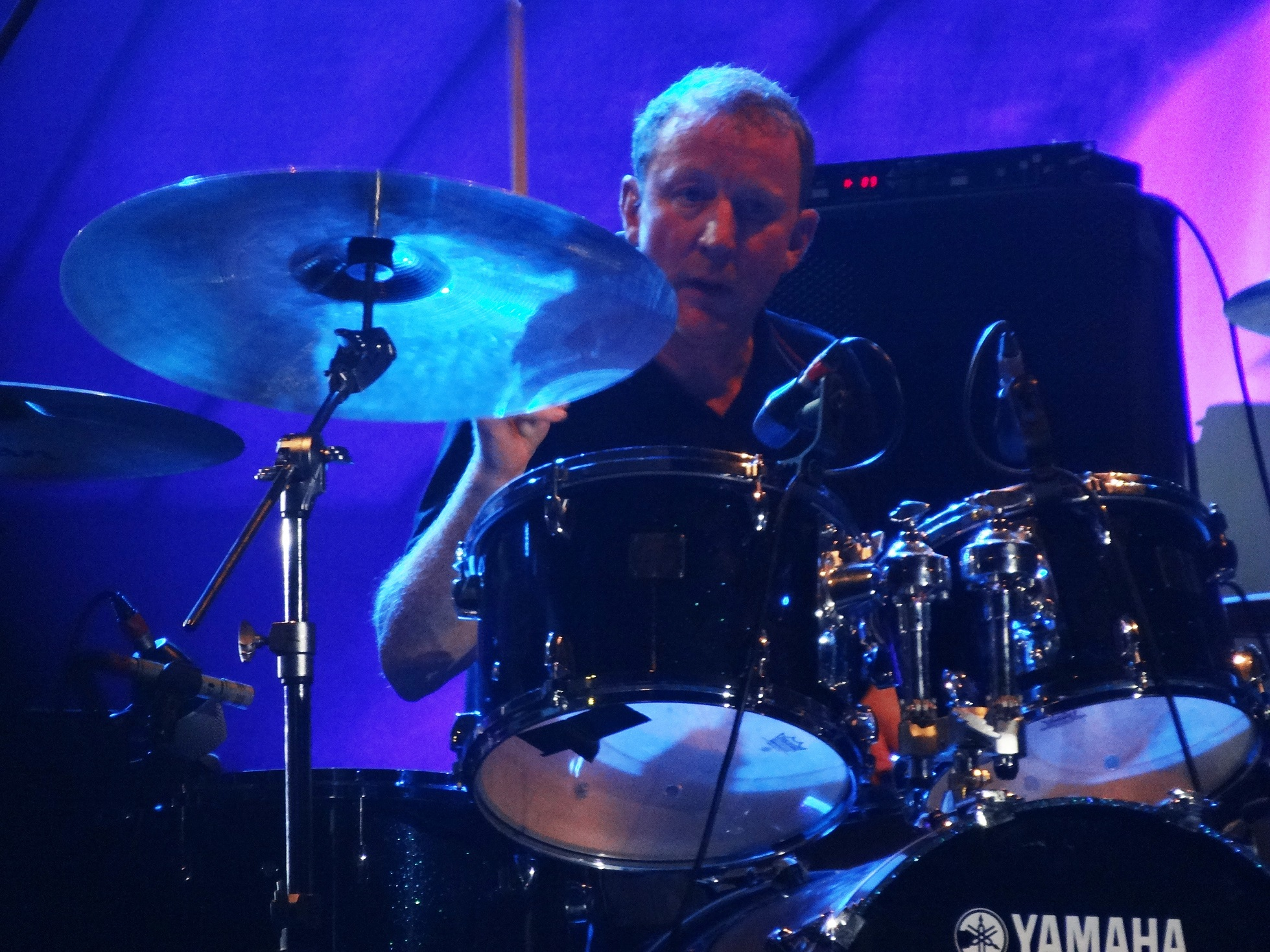
Rowntree performing with Blur in Rome in 2013

Rowntree played in bands with Graham Coxon while they were growing up in Colchester. He also knew Coxon's father, who taught jazz classes at Landermere. In 1989, Coxon introduced Rowntree to Damon Albarn, who was forming a band around Goldsmiths, University of London. Rowntree was asked to join and left his job to move to London. With the addition of Alex James, and after two name changes, the band settled on Blur and were signed to Food Records, which was distributed through EMI. EMI later acquired Food Records and Blur were absorbed into EMI.

=== Beagle 2 Mars mission ===
In 1998 Rowntree's life-long fascination with space led him to get involved in the Beagle 2 Mars mission. The previous year the European Space Agency (ESA) had announced its first planetary mission, an orbiter named the Mars Express. The Open University's Prof Colin Pillinger proposed it should carry a lander dedicated to looking for life and conducting scientific analyses.

Rowntree and fellow band member Alex James became involved after taking a behind the scenes tour at Houston's NASA space centre. They were struck by how many of the people they met there were British and wondered why they had to go to America to do space research and work in the industry. When they got back to the UK, they came across Beagle 2 while looking for UK space projects and pledged to support it. At that time, the cost of the lander project was estimated at £25 million and did not have wide support.

Rowntree and James joined the Beagle 2 team in 1998 to help with PR. They used their platform to help promote the project. Their support attracted high-profile support from the artist Damien Hirst and industry and financial backers. And after years of lobbying, the UK Government and ESA agreed to help finance the project. The Mars Express mission, carrying Beagle 2, was launched in June 2003. It carried a signature tune written by Blur to be beamed back from Mars to announce the lander's arrival and one of Hirst's trademark spot paintings to be used for the calibration of Beagle 2's cameras. The Beagle 2 lost contact with earth but was spotted on Mars' surface ten years later by the UK Space Agency in images taken by a NASA orbiter.

Rowntree says: "In the same way that Damien Hirst got the first artwork on Mars, we got the first music on Mars."

=== XFM radio ===
In 2014, Rowntree started as a presenter for Global Radio's alternative rock radio station XFM (now Radio X) with a regular show on Sunday nights. On his first show, he played songs by John Lennon, Elbow and The Polyphonic Spree, interspersed with discussions with his studio friend, "researcher George", on "nerdy" topics like Mars.

=== Video ===
On 31 July 2018, Rowntree appeared in the video for Slaves' released single, "Chokehold", as a drummer auditioning for a part in the band.

=== Podcast ===
Rowntree hosts The Dave Rowntree Podcast Show on Spotify with "researcher George". The first series was six episodes long, starting with an episode of Rowntree's "go to" music for challenging times released in November 2020.

=== Solo career ===
In November 2021, Rowntree signed a deal with Cooking Vinyl for his first solo record. In a statement, Rowntree said, "As a kid I used to spend hours spinning the dial on my radio, dreaming of escape to all the places whose exotic stations I heard. I've tried to make an album like that – tuning through the spectrum, stopping at each song telling a story about a turning point in my life, then spinning the dial and moving on."

His first solo single, "London Bridge", was released on 5 July 2022.

Rowntree's first solo album, Radio Songs, was released on 20 January 2023.

== Film and animation ==
=== Animation ===
Rowntree is a computer animator and owned an animation company called Nanomation for eleven years. Clients included advertising agencies and The 11 O'Clock Show. He also directed two series of the South Park-esque animated show Empire Square, which made its TV debut on Channel 4 on 18 February 2005.

=== Non-photorealistic rendering ===
Rowntree has an interest in computer graphics and has contributed to three research papers on topics related to non-photorealistic rendering. The papers look at translating video to animation using novel techniques to track and visualise movement.

=== Film and television ===
Rowntree also works in film and TV soundtrack composition. He and Ian Arber composed the music and score for the 2018 Bros documentary Bros: After the Screaming Stops. He also worked on the BBC series The Capture, which premiered in 2019 and Netflix's science fiction series The One (March 2021).

== Legal and political career ==
=== Law ===
Rowntree trained to become a solicitor when Blur took a hiatus in 2006. He worked in the criminal department of London law firm Kingsley Napley, a firm of solicitors based in Moorgate, London.

In July 2017, he was awarded an honorary doctorate in law by Greenwich University, becoming an Honorary Doctor of Laws (HonLLD).

=== Labour candidate and councillor ===
Rowntree has been a keen activist and supporter of the Labour Party since becoming a member in 2002, and has been chair of London's West End branch. In April 2007, he unsuccessfully contested the safe Conservative seat of Marylebone High Street on Westminster City Council. In July 2008, he fought the Labour-held seat of Church Street, but was unsuccessful again.

In February 2008, he was selected by the Cities of London and Westminster Constituency Labour Party to stand against the incumbent Conservative MP Mark Field at the 2010 general election; Rowntree was defeated at that election. In 2011, he sought selection as the Labour candidate for Norwich South, but lost to Clive Lewis, a journalist and former soldier, who went on to be elected as the constituency's MP.

In the Norfolk County Council election on 4 May 2017, Rowntree was elected as county councillor for the University ward in Norwich. He stood down before the 2021 election, due to the COVID-19 pandemic: in a statement on his website, he said "It has been a joy and a privilege to represent the residents in University Ward, and I've made friendships here that will last a lifetime. I hope that when this is all over, I can get back involved somehow."

In March 2024, Rowntree was selected as Labour's prospective parliamentary candidate for the constituency of Mid Sussex in the 2024 general election. The seat was won by the Liberal Democrat MP Alison Bennett. Rowntree's campaign focused on housing and town centre regeneration.

=== Political views ===
Rowntree is an opponent of the death penalty and patron of Amicus, an organisation that provides legal representation to people on death row in the United States.

In August 2014, Rowntree was one of 200 public figures who were signatories to a letter to The Guardian opposing Scottish independence in the run-up to September's referendum on that issue.

Rowntree supported the Terminally Ill Adults (End of Life) Bill. He called the current UK laws banning assisted dying "psychopathic" and said the laws show "absolutely no empathy for the sufferer".

=== Campaigns ===
Rowntree has campaigned against prosecution of internet music filesharers. He is a member of the Advisory Council of the Open Rights Group, a United Kingdom-based digital rights NGO. When asked on Blur's website how he felt about their single "Out of Time" being leaked on the internet before its release, he replied "I'd rather it gushed".

Rowntree is a founding director of the Featured Artists' Coalition.

In May 2016, he organised a celebrity "Star Boot Sale" to raise funds for mobile health clinics to help Syrian refugees and host Jordanians in need. Stars manning the stalls included Hot Chip, Melanie C, KT Tunstall and Badly Drawn Boy, with Phil Daniels as auctioneer for special lots, like Kylie Minogue's handbag.

Rowntree attempted to initiate a class action against the Performing Rights Society over the allocation of unidentified royalties but the Competition Appeal Tribunal declined to pursue the matter in August 2025 and an application by Rowntree to the Court of Appeal in 2026 failed to overturn that decision.

== Other interests ==
Rowntree obtained a full pilot's licence in 1995. He has held a foundation licence for amateur radio in the UK since 2012, upgrading to a full licence in 2016. His callsign is M0IEG.

== Personal life ==
In 1994, Rowntree married Paola Marra, a Canadian woman. They divorced in the early 2000s. In 2024, Marra, who had been living with terminal bowel cancer since 2021, travelled to Dignitas in Switzerland to take her own life. Rowntree offered to accompany her, but she declined.

In 2007, he was dating Michelle de Vries.

In the early 1990s, Rowntree was a heavy drinker. He stopped drinking alcohol in 1993 after a particularly heavy drinking session with members of the band Siouxsie and the Banshees. However, several years later, he began a cocaine habit. This led to a public incident in 2003 when, during a TV interview of Blur for MuchMusic by the Canadian journalist Nardwuar, Rowntree was seen mocking and physically intimidating Nardwuar throughout the interview. Rowntree has apologised several times since for his behaviour, saying that "the day after a cocaine binge I'd sometimes fly into a murderous rage, and that this was the case on that day". Nardwuar accepted Rowntree's apology on Twitter. By 2007, Rowntree stated that he had stopped using drugs and was "active in the recovery community". He keeps a clip of the interview on his phone, to watch if he ever considers relapsing into drug use. Nardwuar later said of Rowntree's apology "It's so nice of him. I love the fact that someone is using my interview for motivational purposes."

Rowntree is a trustee on the board of Release, a charity that campaigns for evidence-based drug policies founded on principles of public health.

== Discography ==
Solo albums

- Radio Songs (2023)

With Blur

- Leisure (1991)
- Modern Life Is Rubbish (1993)
- Parklife (1994)
- The Great Escape (1995)
- Blur (1997)
- 13 (1999)
- Think Tank (2003)
- The Magic Whip (2015)
- The Ballad of Darren (2023)

With Gorillaz

- Gorillaz (2001) — Drums on track 7 and 15

With The Ailerons

- Left Right (EP) (2006)

Soundtracks

- After the Screaming Stops: Original Motion Picture Soundtrack (2019)
- The Capture (Original Television Soundtrack) (2020)
- The One: Season 1 (Music from the Netflix Series) (2021)
- The Capture: Series Two (Music from the Original Series) (2022)
- Paris Has Fallen (Original Series Soundtrack) (2024)
- The Capture: Series Three (Music from the Original Series) (2026)
