= Alex James (bassist) =

English bassist (born 1968)

Alex James FRSA
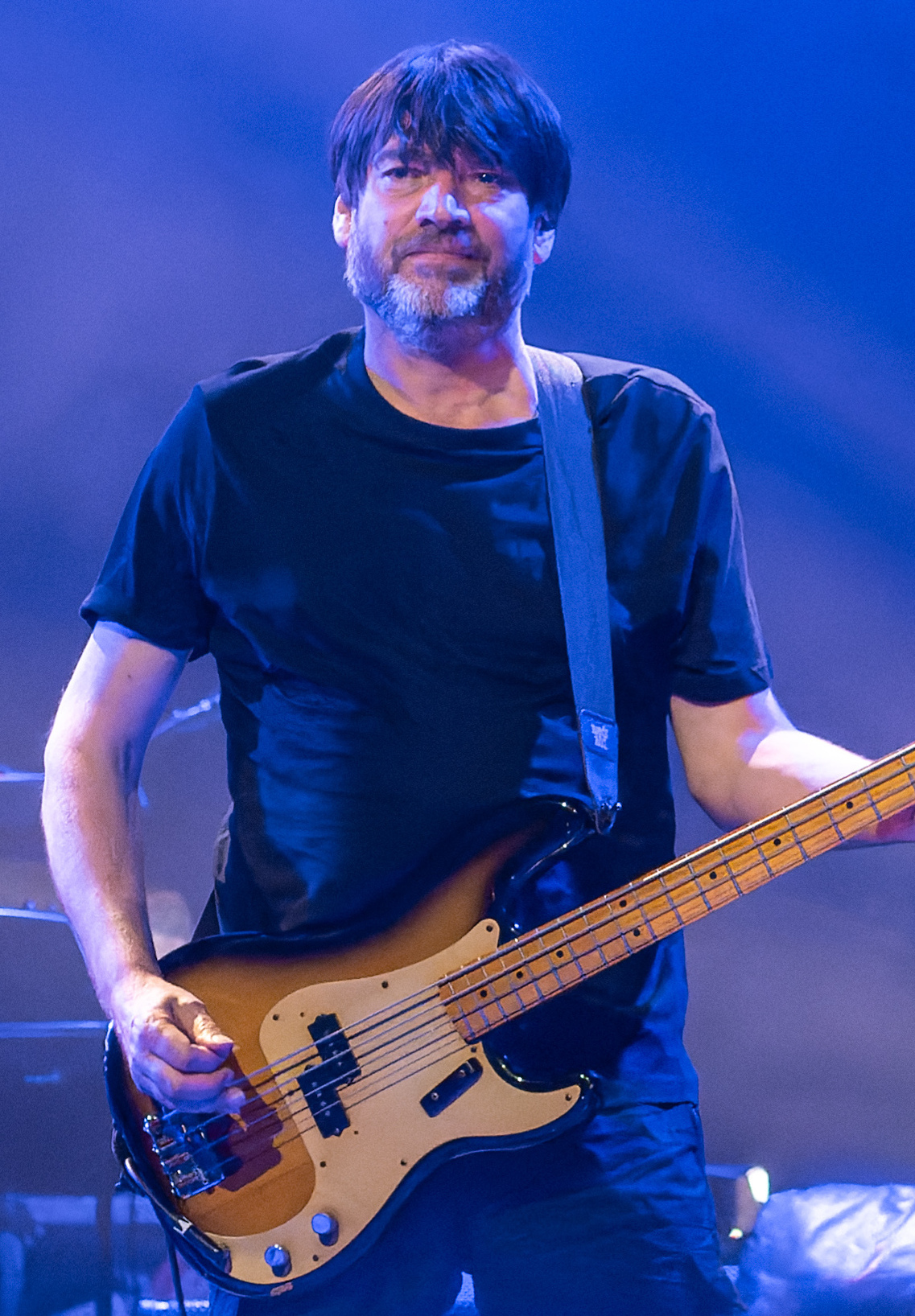
- James performing with Blur in 2023

Background information
- Born: Steven Alexander James; November 21, 1968 (age 57); Boscombe, Bournemouth, England
- Genres: Rock; Britpop
- Occupations: Musician
- Instrument: Bass guitar
- Years active: 1988–present
- Member of: Blur
- Formerly of: Fat Les; WigWam; Me Me Me

Steven Alexander James (born 21 November 1968) is an English musician, best known as the bassist of the rock band Blur. He has also played with the bands Fat Les, Me Me Me, WigWam, and Bad Lieutenant.

== Early life and education ==
Steven Alexander James was born in Boscombe, Bournemouth, and attended the state grammar school Bournemouth School, where he started playing in bands.

James credits the Beatles with inspiring him to pursue music: "I was off school with chickenpox when John Lennon was shot in 1980. I spent the week watching a VHS recording of the Beatles film Help!, which was broadcast on TV the day he died. I still watch it once a year. Then I bought a Beatles songbook and a guitar, figured out the chord shapes and started strumming and singing along. I never looked back."

== Music career ==
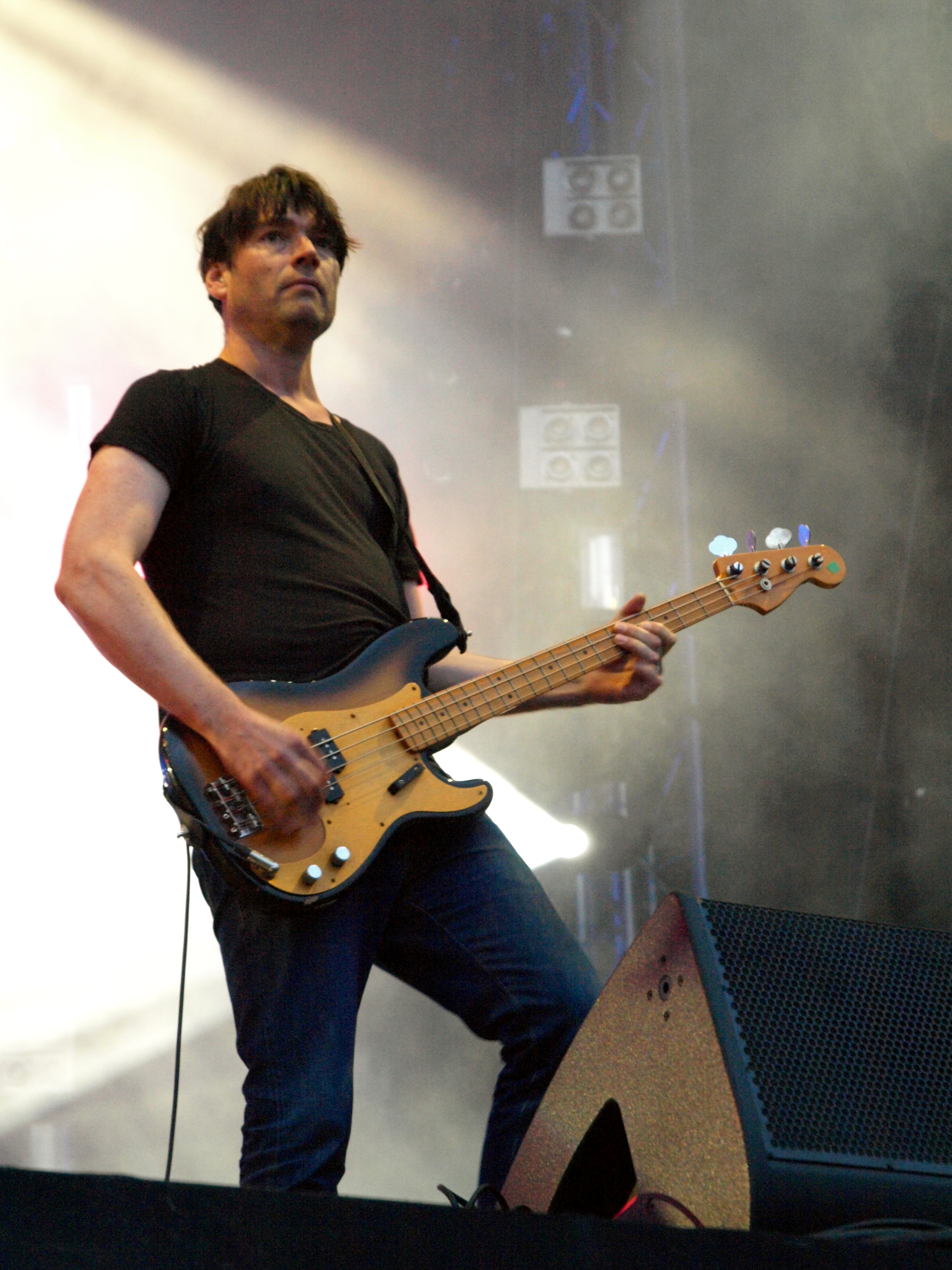
James performing with Blur in 2013

In 1988, James met future bandmate Graham Coxon at Goldsmiths College, where James studied French. Introductions with Coxon's old school friend Damon Albarn and Dave Rowntree soon took place; at the time Albarn and Rowntree were part of a band called Circus.

In 1989, James joined Coxon, Albarn and Rowntree's new band, Seymour, which would later be renamed Blur. He has been in the band ever since, although in 2008 he described the days of being a constant band member as "a past-life".

Soon after, Blur connected with returning bandmate Graham Coxon to perform at Glastonbury Festival, Hyde Park, Oxegen and T in the Park during the summer of 2009. They also played shows at Goldsmiths College, Essex Museum, and other venues around the UK and mainland Europe. Blur headlined a show at Hyde Park for the 2012 Summer Olympics closing ceremony. In 2013, the band performed at the Rock Werchter in Belgium, the Spanish and Portuguese dates of the Primavera Sound festival, and the Coachella Valley Music and Arts Festival in the United States.

In 2026, James announced Alex James Britpop Classical, a collective of session singers and a 50-piece classical orchestra who perform songs from iconic Britpop bands such as Blur, Joy Division, Radiohead, and Oasis. James plays bass for Britpop Classical. The group toured the UK in 2026, performing their opening night at the Royal Albert Hall in London.

=== Collaborations ===
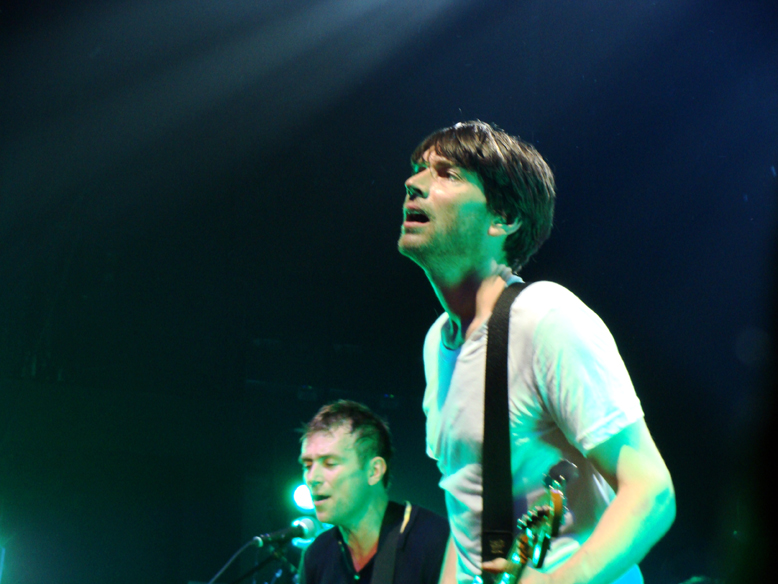
Alex James in 2009

In 1998, James formed Fat Les with actor Keith Allen and artist Damien Hirst, releasing the unofficial theme song (excluding three others) "Vindaloo" for the 1998 FIFA World Cup, which reached number 2 in the UK Singles Chart. He also worked on side project Me Me Me with Stephen Duffy, co-wrote songs for Marianne Faithfull (appearing in drag playing a double bass in the music video for her single "Sex With Strangers") and Jane McDonald, and worked with Florence and the Machine and Gene Loves Jezebel.

James worked with Sophie Ellis-Bextor on her solo debut Read My Lips, co-writing and co-producing "Move This Mountain", and co-producing "I Believe" with Ellis-Bextor and producer Ben Hillier. He also played bass on both tracks. Ellis-Bextor's 2003 album, Shoot from the Hip also featured James as bass player and co-writer on the track "Love Is It Love". He also joined his friend and singer-songwriter Betty Boo in a band called WigWam in 2005.

In 2009, James appeared as bass player on debut Bad Lieutenant record Never Cry Another Tear. The band consists of New Order lead singer Bernard Sumner and guitarist Phil Cunningham, along with Jake Evans of Rambo And Leroy. In 2013, James co-wrote the song "Did I Lose You?", performed by Giorgia and Olly Murs.

== Other ventures ==
=== Television appearances ===
James has made a variety of television appearances. In 2001 he featured in Channel 4's documentary Gouge about the Pixies. He represented The Idler on University Challenge: The Professionals in 2005, and in 2007 served as a judge on Channel 4's Orange unsignedAct. He has also appeared as a guest on Have I Got News for You, The F Word, and BBC Two's Maestro. In 2008 he presented the documentary Cocaine Diaries: Alex James in Colombia on BBC America. He has since appeared on Never Mind the Buzzcocks, Popstar to Operastar, Top Gear, The Chase, The Bank Job, Through the Keyhole, and in August 2015, he won the Channel 4 programme,Celebrity Fifteen to One.

In 2016 James presented the documentary Alex James: Slowing Down Fast Fashion, exploring the environmental and social impacts of the fashion industry.

=== Writing ===
James has written about food, farming, and lifestyle for publications including The Sun, The Spectator, and The Observer. His autobiography, Bit of a Blur, was published in 2007, and was followed by All Cheeses Great and Small: A Life Less Blurry in 2011, focusing on his transition to cheesemaking.

=== Radio ===
In 2007 James presented the BBC Radio 4 programme On Your Farm. He currently hosts Alex James’s Date Night on Classic FM every Saturday evening. He previously presented The A-Z of Classic FM Music, which began in 2008 and won a Silver Sony Radio Academy Award for Best Music Programme. James also contributed the foreword to the show's accompanying book and CD box set, published by Reader's Digest in 2010.

From 11 January to 29 March 2026, James presented a Sunday evening show on Virgin Radio UK.

=== Cheesemaking ===
After leaving Blur, James established a cheese farm in Kingham, Oxfordshire. He collaborated with New Zealand cheese specialist Juliet Harbutt on two varieties, Little Wallop (2007) and Farleigh Wallop (2009), the latter winning Best Goat's Cheese at the 2009 British Cheese Awards.

In 2011, he introduced a commercially available range of flavoured cheeses in partnership with Asda, with varieties such as "cheddar and tomato ketchup" and "cheddar and tikka masala". The Guardian described the range as "bizarre flavour mash-ups in sliced, processed, plasticky form".

=== Music and food festivals ===
In 2011, James announced that his Oxfordshire farm would host an annual food and music festival. The first event, Alex James Presents Harvest, was held from 9 to 12 September 2011 in partnership with Big Wheel Promotions. The festival ran into financial difficulties after Big Wheel Promotions went bankrupt, leaving stallholders, performers and the ticketing company unpaid. Kingham Primary School, which had provided entertainment, was reported to be owed £7,000, with the headteacher stating that the shortfall could affect the school’s music teaching budget.

A local concert was organised in December 2011 to help cover the debt, with James pledging to match the funds raised. Big Wheel Promotions subsequently ceased trading, despite having already collected ticket fees for a planned 2012 festival.

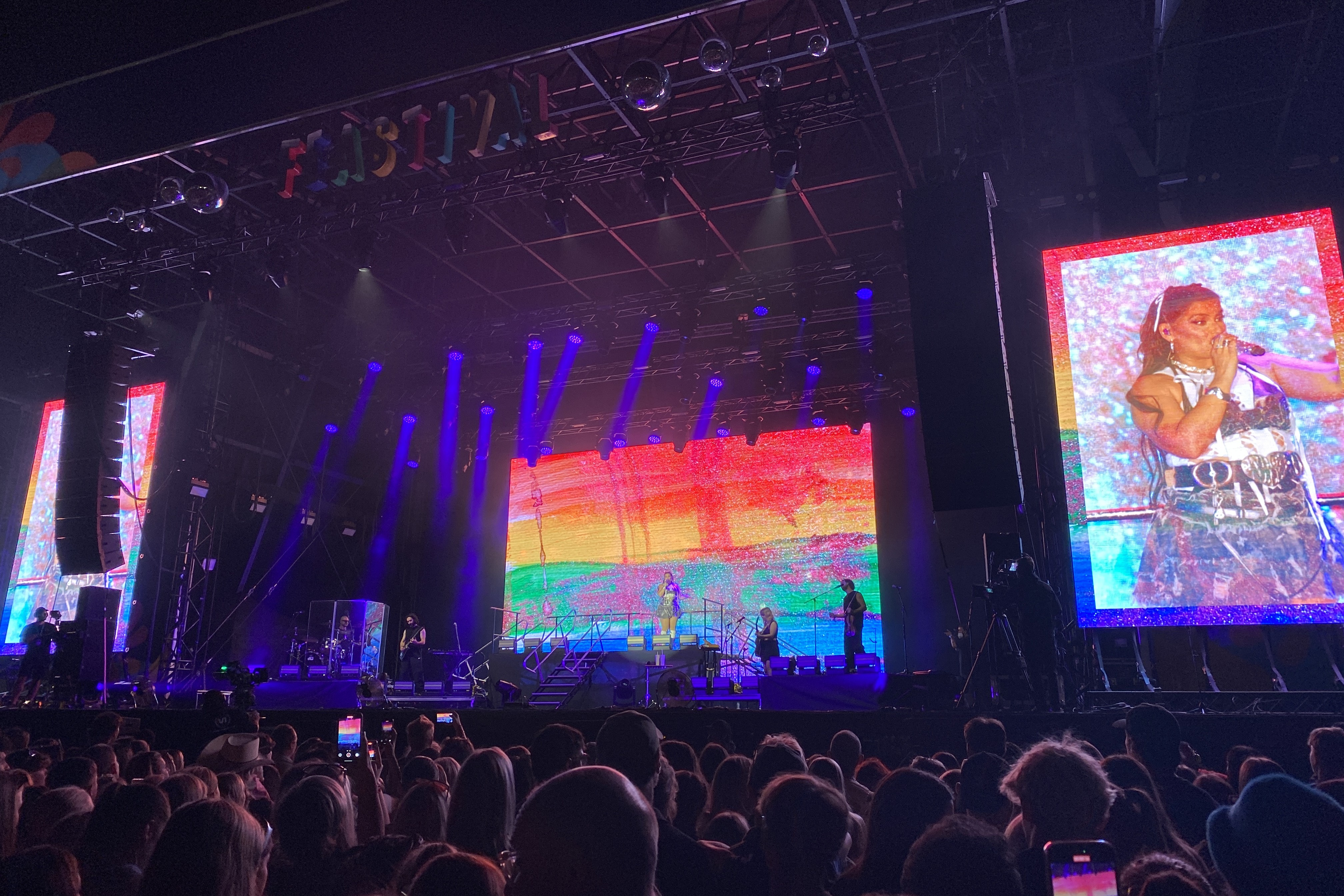
Nelly Furtado performing at Alex's Big Feastival in Kingham in 2025

In 2012, James co-hosted the first edition of The Big Feastival with Jamie Oliver, an annual food and music festival also held on his farm. The first edition included performances by artists such as Paloma Faith, Gaz Coombes, and Razorlight, as well as cookery demonstrations and children’s entertainment. The festival returned in 2013, and by 2014 attendance was reported at over 30,000. It was held over the August Bank Holiday weekend in 2015.

In 2019, James launched a schools art competition linked to the festival, with the winning entry used as a stage backdrop.

In 2024, the festival was held from 23 to 25 August, and included performances by Snow Patrol and Becky Hill, alongside food, comedy, and children’s events.

== Personal life ==
James's father, Jason, was sales director of a company selling waste compactors and baling machines. James has a younger sister named Deborah. James married Claire Neate, a music video producer, in April 2003 in Cheltenham. They have five children. The family live near Kingham in Oxfordshire on a 200-acre (0.81 km2) cheese farm; James is considered by the press to be a member of the Chipping Norton set.

In his book, James describes a long period of decadent lifestyle. To celebrate his birthday in São Paulo one year, he got the tour manager to find him a balthazar of champagne, which he shared with five groupies who were at the hotel door. James also claimed to have spent about 1 million pounds on champagne and cocaine; in 2015, however, he admitted this claim was fabricated to help promote the book. He mentions a long list of favourite bars, including the Groucho Club and The Colony Room.

Bournemouth University presented James with an honorary doctorate in November 2010. He also received an Honorary Doctorate of Arts from the University of Gloucestershire in November 2013.

In December 2019, ahead of the upcoming UK general election, James posted on Twitter, saying "I just cannot bring myself to vote for Jeremy Corbyn".

== Discography ==
=== Blur ===
- Leisure (1991)
- Modern Life Is Rubbish (1993)
- Parklife (1994)
- The Great Escape (1995)
- Blur (1997)
- 13 (1999)
- Think Tank (2003)
- The Magic Whip (2015)
- The Ballad of Darren (2023)

=== Me Me Me ===
Singles

- Hanging Around (1996)

=== Fat Les ===
Singles

- Vindaloo (1998)
- Naughty Christmas (Goblin in the Office) (1988)
- Jerusalem (2000)
- Who Invented Fish and Chips (2002)

=== WigWam ===
Singles

- WigWam (2006)

=== As session musician ===
With Sophie Ellis-Bextor

- Read My Lips (2001)
- Shoot from the Hip (2003)

With Bad Lieutenant

- Never Cry Another Tear (2009)

With Giorgia

- Senza paura (2013)

== Bibliography ==
- Bit of a Blur. London: Little, Brown. 2007.
- All Cheeses Great and Small: A Life Less Blurry. London: Fourth Estate. 2012.
- Over the Rainbow: Tales from an Unexpected Year. London: Particular Books. 2024.

== See also ==
- List of cheesemakers
