= Gutkin =

Gutkin is a surname. Notable people with the surname include:

- Heinrich Gutkin (1879–1941), Estonian politician
- Lev Gutkin (1914–2011), Russian scientist
- Lisa Gutkin (fl. 1989–2019), American violinist, singer, and songwriter

== See also ==
- Gutkind
