= List of awards and nominations received by Blur =

Blur awards and nominations
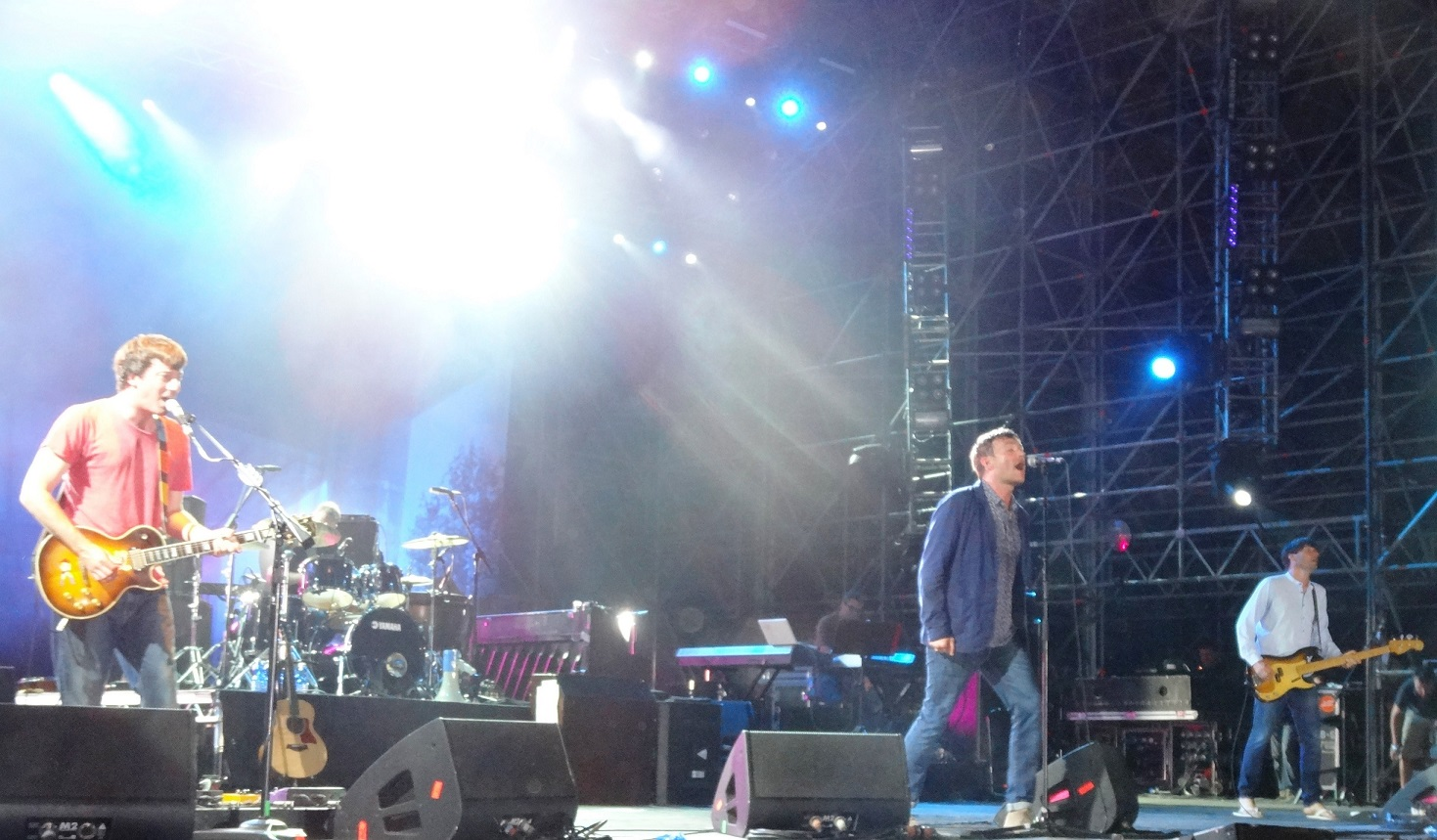
- Blur performing at Rock in Rome Festival in July 2013.
Awards and nominations
Award	Wins	Nominations
Brit	5	20
Grammy	0	1
Ivor Novello	1	1
MTV Europe	1	2
NME	11	19
Q	7	14
MOJO Awards	0	1
PRS for Music	1	1
Mercury Prize	0	2
South Bank Show Awards	1	1
MTV Video Music Awards	0	3
Smash Hits	2	2
UK Festival Awards	2	3
GQ	2	2
Music Week	1	1
British Animation Awards	1	1
D&AD Awards	2	5
The Best Awards	0	1
Danish Music Awards	0	1
Edinburgh Film Festival	1	1
FOCAL Awards	1	1
Gaffa Awards	2	3

Totals (Note: Certain award groups do not simply award one winner. They acknowledge several different recipients, have runners-up, and have third place. Since this is a specific recognition and is different from losing an award, runner-up mentions are considered wins in this award tally. For simplification and to avoid errors, each award in this list has been presumed to have had a prior nomination.)
- Wins: 43
- Nominations: 87

Blur are an English rock band formed of singer–keyboardist Damon Albarn, guitarist Graham Coxon, bassist Alex James and drummer Dave Rowntree. The band are best known for popularising the Britpop movement. However, their later material was more influenced by Indie Rock, Electronic and Hip Hop music. After a hiatus, the band reformed in 2009.

The band have released nine studio albums: Leisure (1991), Modern Life Is Rubbish (1993), Parklife (1994), The Great Escape (1995), Blur (1997), 13 (1999), Think Tank (2003), The Magic Whip (2015) and The Ballad of Darren (2023). Out of 17 nominations, Blur have won 5 Brit Awards, making them one of the most successful acts at the ceremony. Four of Blur's Brits were received in 1995: the most any artist has won in a single ceremony. The other was received in 2012 for outstanding contribution to music. Blur have also been nominated twice for the prestigious Mercury Prize.

== Artrocker Awards ==
Year	Nominee / work	Award	Result
2012	Blur 21	Reissue of the Year	Won

== The Best Awards ==
The Best Awards celebrate the very best of British marketing.

Year	Nominee / work	Award	Result
1996	"The Universal"	Best Video	Nominated

== Brit Awards ==
The Brit Awards are the British Phonographic Industry's annual pop music awards. Blur have won 5 Brits out of 17 nominations, making them one of the most successful winners at the ceremony. Four of Blur's Brits were received in 1995: the most any artist has won in a single ceremony. Nominations for production work are also featured on this list.

Year	Nominee / work	Award	Result
1995	Blur	British Group	Won
1995	Parklife	British Album of the Year	Won
1995	"Girls & Boys"	British Single of the Year	Nominated
1995	"Parklife"	British Single of the Year	Won
1995	"Parklife"	British Video of the Year	Won
1996	"The Universal"	British Video of the Year	Nominated
1996	"Country House"	British Video of the Year	Nominated
1996	"Country House"	British Single of the Year	Nominated
1996	The Great Escape	British Album of the Year	Nominated
1996	Blur	British Group	Nominated
1998	"Song 2"	British Single of the Year	Nominated
1998	"Song 2"	British Video of the Year	Nominated
2000	Blur	British Group	Nominated
2000	"Tender"	British Single of the Year	Nominated
2004	Think Tank	British Album of the Year	Nominated
2012	Blur	Outstanding Contribution to Music	Won
2016	Blur	British Group	Nominated
2024	Blur	British Group	Nominated
2024	Blur	British Rock/Alternative Act	Nominated
2024	The Ballad of Darren	British Album of the Year	Nominated

== British Animation Awards ==
Year	Nominee / work	Award	Result
2004	"Good Song"	Best Video	Won

== D&AD Awards ==
Year	Nominee / work	Award	Result
2000	"Coffee & TV"	Pop Promos / Best Direction (Silver)	Nominated
2004	"Good Song"	Best Animation (Silver)	Won
2004	"Good Song"	Best Direction (Silver)	Won
2004	"Out of Time"	Best Cinematography (Silver)	Nominated
2004	"Out of Time"	Best Editing (Silver)	Nominated

== Danish Music Awards ==
Year	Nominee / work	Award	Result
2004	Think Tank	Best Album	Nominated

== Edinburgh Film Festival ==
Year	Nominee / work	Award	Result
2004	"Good Song"	McLaren Animation Award	Won

== FOCAL Awards ==
Year	Nominee / work	Award	Result
2004	"Out of Time"	Best Use Of Footage In A Pop Music Promo	Won

== Gaffa Awards ==
Year	Nominee / work	Award	Result
2004	Blur	Best International Band	Won
2004	Damon Albarn	Best International Singer	Won
2004	Blur	Best Live Act	Nominated

== Grammy Awards ==
The Grammy Awards are presented annually by the National Academy of Recording Arts and Sciences of the United States for outstanding achievements in the record industry. Blur have received one nomination.

Year	Nominee / work	Award	Result
2011	"No Distance Left to Run"	Best Long Form Music Video	Nominated

== GQ Awards ==
Year	Nominee / work	Award	Result
2003	Blur	Band Of The Year	Won
2015	Blur	Band Of The Year	Won

== Ivor Novello Awards ==
The Ivor Novello Awards, named after the Cardiff born entertainer Ivor Novello, are awards for songwriting and composing. Blur have received one award.

Year	Nominee / work	Award	Result
1996	Damon Albarn	Songwriters of the Year	Won*

- Shared with Noel Gallagher

== Mercury Prize ==
The Mercury Prize is an annual music prize awarded for the best album from the United Kingdom or Ireland. Blur have received two nominations.

Year	Nominee / work	Award	Result
1994	Parklife	Mercury Prize	Nominated
1999	13	Mercury Prize	Nominated

== MOJO Awards ==
Year	Nominee / work	Award	Result
2009	Blur	Inspiration Award	Nominated

== Music Week Awards ==
Year	Nominee / work	Award	Result
2000	"Coffee & TV"	Best Pop Video	Won*

== MTV Europe Music Awards ==
The MTV Europe Music Awards (EMA's) were established in 1994 by MTV Europe to celebrate the most popular music videos in Europe. Blur have received one awards from two nominations.

Year	Nominee / work	Award	Result
1994	"Girls & Boys"	Best Song	Nominated
1999	"Coffee & TV"	Best Video	Won

== MTV Video Music Awards ==
The MTV Video Music Awards (VMA's) were established in 1984 by MTV to honor the best in music videos. Blur have received three nominations.

Year	Nominee / work	Award	Result
1997	"Song 2"	Best Alternative Video	Nominated
1997	"Song 2"	Best Group Video	Nominated
2000	"Coffee & TV"	Best Breakthrough Video	Nominated

== Music Week Sync Awards ==
The Music Week Awards are UK's only music awards that recognise labels, publishing, live, retail, A&R, radio, marketing and PR, founded by the trade paper Music Week

Year	Nominee / work	Award	Result
2016	"Song 2" (Madeon Remix)	Trailer (Video Game)	Won

== NME Awards ==
The NME Awards are an annual music awards show, founded by the music magazine NME. Blur have won 11 awards.

Year	Nominee / work	Award	Result
1995	Parklife	Best LP (voted by NME readers)	Won
1995	"Girls & Boys"	NME Single Of The Year	Won
1995	Blur	Live Act Of The Year	Won
1995	Blur	Best Band	Won
1995	"Parklife"	Best Video	Won
1998	Blur	Best Band	Nominated
1998	Blur	Best Album	Nominated
1998	"Song 2"	Best Video	Nominated
2000	Blur	Best Band	Won
2000	Blur	Best Live Act	Nominated
2000	"Coffee & TV"	Best Video	Won
2000	"No Distance Left to Run"	Best Video	Nominated
2000	"Tender"	Best Single	Won
2000	13	Best Album	Nominated
2010	Blur - Hyde Park	Best Live Event	Won
2013	Blur 21	Best Re-Issue	Won
2013	Blur	Best Live Band	Nominated
2016	"Ong Ong"	Best Video	Nominated
2016	"New World Towers"	Best Music Film	Won
2017	Leisure	Best Reissue	Nominated

== PRS for Music ==
Year	Nominee / work	Award	Result
2009	Blur	Heritage Award	Won

== Q Awards ==
The Q Awards are the UK's annual music awards run by the music magazine Q.

Year	Nominee / work	Award	Result
1994	Parklife	Best Album	Won
1994	Stephen Street	Best Producer	Won
1995	The Great Escape	Best Album	Won
1999	Blur	Best Act in the World Today	Won
1999	William Orbit	Best Producer	Won
2000	Blur	Best Act in the World Today	Nominated
2003	Think Tank	Best Album	Won
2003	Blur/Ben Hillier	Best Producer	Nominated
2003	Blur	Best Act In The World Today	Nominated
2009	Blur	Best Live Act	Nominated
2012	Blur	Best Live Act	Won
2012	Blur	Best Act In The World Today	Nominated
2015	The Magic Whip	Best Album	Nominated
2015	Blur	Best Act In The World Today	Nominated

== Smash Hits Awards ==
The Smash Hits Poll Winners Party was an awards ceremony voted by the readers of Smash Hits magazine. Blur have received two awards out of two nominations.

Year	Nominee / work	Award	Result
1994	Parklife	Best Album	Won
1994	Blur	Best Alternative Band	Won

== South Bank Show Awards ==
The South Bank Show Awards are given to achievements in the arts. Blur have received one award.

Year	Nominee / work	Award	Result
2004	Think Tank	Best Album	Won

== UK Festival Awards ==
Year	Nominee / work	Award	Result
2009	"Tender"	Anthem Of The Summer	Nominated
2009	Blur	Best Headline Performance	Won
2009	Damon Albarn	Festival Fitty Of The Year - Boys	Won

== Recognition ==
In July 2009, "Song 2" was voted #61 in Triple J Hottest 100 of All Time.
