= Shynola =

Group of visual artists from the UK

Shynola are a London-based directing team who have worked across live-action and animation for over twenty years. Chris Harding, Richard Kenworthy, Jason Groves and the late Gideon Baws formed Shynola while they were at art college in the late 1990s.

Their music video work includes musical artists such as Junior Senior, Radiohead, Beck, Blur, Coldplay, ABBA and Queens of the Stone Age, along advertisements for brands like Nike, Audi, PlayStation and Maserati. They also created title sequences for series and films: The IT Crowd, The Hitchhiker’s Guide to the Galaxy, Scott Pilgrim vs. the World, Mandy, and Netflix’s GLOW.

Their awards include a British Independent Film Award and three times Emmy nominations, with wins at Edinburgh International Film Festival, D&AD awards and UK Music Video Awards.

In 2008, founding member Gideon Baws died at age 33.

== Notable works ==
=== Music videos ===
Year	Artist	Song title
1999	Unkle	"Guns Blazing (Drums of Death, Pt. 1)"
1999	Quannum featuring Lyrics Born and The Poets of Rhythm	"I Changed My Mind" (Stereo MCs Rattlesnake Mix)
2000	Radiohead	Kid A blips: 'Basement Bear', 'Bear Witch', 'Dead Air', 'Drown', 'Eyes', 'Geese', 'Giant', 'Planes', 'Scarecrows', 'Six Million Thom', 'Stars', 'Thom Over Planes', 'Valley', 'Wake Up', 'White Mountains', 'Yeti'
2001	Radiohead	"Pyramid Song"
2001	Stephen Malkmus	"Jo Jo's Jacket"
2001	Unkle	"Eye for an Eye"
2002	Lambchop	"Is a Woman"
2002	Junior Senior	"Move Your Feet"
2002	The Rapture	"House of Jealous Lovers"
2003	Queens of the Stone Age	"Go with the Flow"
2003	Blur	"Crazy Beat"
2003	Blur	"Good Song"
2005	Beck	"E-Pro"
2009	Coldplay	"Strawberry Swing"
2011	Coldplay	"Paradise"
2013	Black Sabbath	"God Is Dead"
2013	Black Sabbath	"End of the Beginning"
2013	Nine Inch Nails	"Everything"
2013	How to Destroy Angels	"How Long?"
2015	Hot Chip	"Need You Now"
2016	Tiësto and Oliver Heldens featuring Natalie La Rose	"The Right Song"
2021	ABBA	"I Still Have Faith in You"
2022	ABBA	"Eagle" as part of ABBA Voyage
2022	ABBA	"Voulez-Vous" as part of ABBA Voyage

=== Short films ===
- "Doug Gives a Talk On Electronics" (1999)
- "The Littlest Robo" (2000)
- "Onwards" with James Jarvis for Nike (2009)
- "Dr. Easy" (2013) Warp Films for Film4
- Nowness and Audi presents "Untaggable - How does #music move us?" (2016) (Music by Mark Pritchard feat. Thom Yorke)

=== Film ===
- The Hitchhiker's Guide to the Galaxy, guide animations (2004)
- Scott Pilgrim vs. the World, title sequence (2010)
- SpectreVision animated logo (2014)
- Mandy, title sequence (2018)
- Daniel Isn't Real, title sequence (2019)
- Color Out of Space, title sequence (2019)

=== TV ===
- "SF:UK" documentary, opening titles (2001)
- "Nathan Barley", various graphics (2005)
- "The IT Crowd", title sequence (2006)
- MTV "BRODOWN" ident with James Jarvis (2012)
- Adam Buxton's "BUG", title sequence (2012)
- Netflix's "GLOW", title sequence (2017)
- Netflix's "Watership Down", prologue graphics (2018)
- Showtime's "VICE", documentary title sequence (2020)

=== Miscellaneous ===
- Laura Marling – A Creature I Don't Know: album cover, sleeve design, booklet
- Radiohead and Epic Games – Kid A Mnesia Exhibition: virtual exhibition

=== Commercials ===
- Nike Presto: "Brutal Honey", "Orange Monk", "Rabid Panda", "Shady Milkman", "Trouble At Home", "Unholy Cumulus" (2000)
- PlayStation / Frequency: "Qbert", "Worm" (2001)
- Nike / Foot Locker: "Uptempo Press 2", "School Ya Again" (2002)
- Honda: "Tail Pipe" (2005)
- Hulu: "Evolution" (2012)
- Beats Music: "Vision" (2014)
- Delta: "Center of it All" (2016)
- Maserati: "Alive" (2019)
- Facebook: "Fashion" (2019)

== Awards and nominations ==
- Emmy Awards (2018) Nomination for Outstanding Hosted Nonfiction Series or Special "Vice"
- Emmy Awards (2018) Nomination for Outstanding Main Title and Graphic Design for an Animated Program "Watership Down"
- Emmy Awards (2018) Nomination for Outstanding Main Title Design "GLOW"
- British Independent Film Awards (2013) Nomination for Best Short Film "Dr. Easy"
- D&AD Awards (2012) Illustration for Design – Laura Marling album "A Creature I Don't Know"
- D&AD Awards (2010) Music Video (Animation) – Coldplay "Strawberry Swing"
- UK MVA Awards (2009) Video of the Year – Coldplay "Strawberry Swing"
- UK MVA Awards (2009) Best Rock Video – Coldplay "Strawberry Swing"
- UK MVA Awards (2009) Best Animation in a Music Video – Coldplay "Strawberry Swing"
- Arena (magazine) (2005) - Men of the Year
- Edinburgh International Film Festival McLaren Animation Award (2004) – Blur "Good Song"
- UK MVA Awards (2004) Best Animation in a Music Video
- D&AD Awards (2004) Best Direction
- D&AD Awards (2004) Best Animation
- British Animation Awards (2004) Best Music Video – Blur "Good Song"
- MTV VMA award (2003) Best Special Effects in a Video – Queens of the Stone Age "Go with the Flow"
- UK MVA Awards (2003) Best Director
- UK MVA Awards (2003) Best Rock Video – Athlete "You Got The Style"
- LEAF Award (2002) Best Pop Promo – U.N.K.L.E. "Eye 4 An Eye"
- Edinburgh International Film Festival McLaren Animation Award (2002) – U.N.K.L.E. "Eye 4 An Eye"
- NME Brat Award (2002) Best Music Video – Radiohead "Pyramid Song"
- UK MVA Awards (2002) Best Rock Video – Radiohead "Pyramid Song"
- UK MVA Awards (2001) Best Alternative Video – Morgan "Flying High"
- UK MVA Awards (2001) Best Marketing Campaign – Radiohead Blips Kid A
- LEAF Award (2000) Best computer-animated Advertisement – Nat West "Fishing Line"
- BBC2 Awards (2000) Best Music Video – Quannum "I Changed My Mind"
- UK MVA Awards (2000) Best Budget Video – Quannum "I Changed My Mind"
- Ottawa International Animation Festival (1999) Best Computer Animation "The Littlest Robo"
