= Crazy Beat =

2003 single by Blur

Single by Blur

from the album Think Tank
- B-side: "The Outsider"; "Don't Be"
- Released: 7 July 2003
- Recorded: 2002
- Studio: Studio in Marrakesh, Morocco
- Genre: Rock; dance-pop; electropop; punk rock
- Length: 3:15
- Label: Parlophone
- Songwriters: Damon Albarn; Alex James; Dave Rowntree
- Producers: Blur; Ben Hillier; Norman Cook

Blur singles chronology
"Out of Time" (2003)	"Crazy Beat" (2003)	"Good Song" (2003)

Music video
- "Crazy Beat" on YouTube

"Crazy Beat" is a song by English rock band Blur from their seventh album, Think Tank (2003). The song was written and produced by band members Damon Albarn, Alex James and Dave Rowntree in Morocco, with Ben Hillier and Norman Cook also serving as producers. It was first serviced to alternative radio stations in the United States on 17 March 2003, by Virgin Records, while being commercially released in the United Kingdom on 7 July 2003, by Parlophone, including the songs "The Outsider" and "Don't Be" as B-sides. A three-chord song, "Crazy Beat" is a dance-pop and electropop track which draws influences of big beat and nu metal into its composition. Lyrically, it praises the effects of music and clubs on crowds.

"Crazy Beat" received mixed reviews from music critics, who generally compared it to the band's previous single "Song 2" (1997); while some felt the song was an interesting track, others saw it as "cartoonish" and out of place on Think Tank. In the United Kingdom, "Crazy Beat" peaked at number 18, while attaining lower positions worldwide. In the United States, it became Blur's first single since "Song 2" to enter the Modern Rock Tracks chart, where it reached number 22. Two music videos were released for the song. The first was directed by animation collective Shynola and features the band performing in a pub as a green audio waveform comes to life, while an alternative version was directed by John Hardwick and shows four women performing a dance routine. Blur performed "Crazy Beat" on some televised shows and live concerts.

== Background and development ==
Recording sessions for Think Tank started in November 2001 in London with the absence of guitarist Graham Coxon, who had been battling alcoholism and depression, thus failing to turn up to the initial sessions. He eventually left the band in 2002 after he had a "mental breakdown" during these sessions. The remaining members of Blur decided to carry on recording, travelling to Morocco to continue developing the album, with the intention to "escape from whatever ghetto we're in and free ourselves by going somewhere new and exciting". The decision was influenced by a visit by vocalist Damon Albarn to the country. The band settled at Marrakesh, where they built a studio together, which "brought everyone closer". Bassist Alex James later admitted, "It was a real hassle to go to Morocco. We had to get all scruffy with customs because they wouldn't let us import our gear into the country. It was a struggle and it cost a fucking fortune", adding that it was "well worth it." Musician Norman Cook, commonly known as Fatboy Slim, was invited to collaborate on the project, as he was a "really nice injection of fresh energy at a point in the proceedings when we needed one, and he fundamentally understands music", according to James.

The villa the band had rented in Marrakesh provided several venues for recording. Hiller recalled that the drum sound for "Crazy Beat" is just the effects of a room made of a marble floor, tiled walls and a concrete ceiling, which provided a "really banging reverb". "Crazy Beat" was first conceived in a different way, with Albarn describing its first version as a "really bad version of Daft Punk". However, the band and the production involved "got sick of it and then put in that descending guitar line over it to rough it up a bit". He later resumed the track as "just a bit of fun we had with Norman", as one of the "few moments where we just let our hair down and got dumb" while recording Think Tank. During these sessions, Cook also produced "Gene by Gene", another track present on the record. In 2015, Albarn declared that he regretted including "Crazy Beat" on Think Tank, rather than a song titled "Me, White Noise", attributing his decision to outside influences at the time; the latter was actually on the record, hidden as a prologue thanks to a digital chicanery which revealed the track if the CD was rewound.

== Release ==
"Crazy Beat" was commercially released on 7 July 2003 in the United Kingdom, by Parlophone. The release included two songs as B-sides: "Don't Be", recorded by the band in Marrakech, which was included on the CD version of the single, while "The Outsider" was featured on the 7" vinyl format. The DVD version for the single included both tracks, in addition to the music video for "Crazy Beat", as well as an exclusive animated version of the video storyboard, while the CD single included an enhanced section with the alternative video for the track. The single's cover art features a satirical portrait of the British royal family by English graffiti artist Banksy; the mural was painted on a building in Stoke Newington. In September 2009, workers sent by Hackney London Borough Council painted over most of the mural with black paint, against the building owner's wishes. However, a crowd gathered and stopped the workers to stop before destroying the artwork completely. In the United States, Virgin Records serviced the track to alternative radio stations on 17 March 2003, as the lead single from the album in the region. Additionally, "Crazy Beat" was used in a commercial for clothing company Levi's. At the time of its release, the band thought that the song did not represent the sound of Think Tank entirely.

== Composition ==
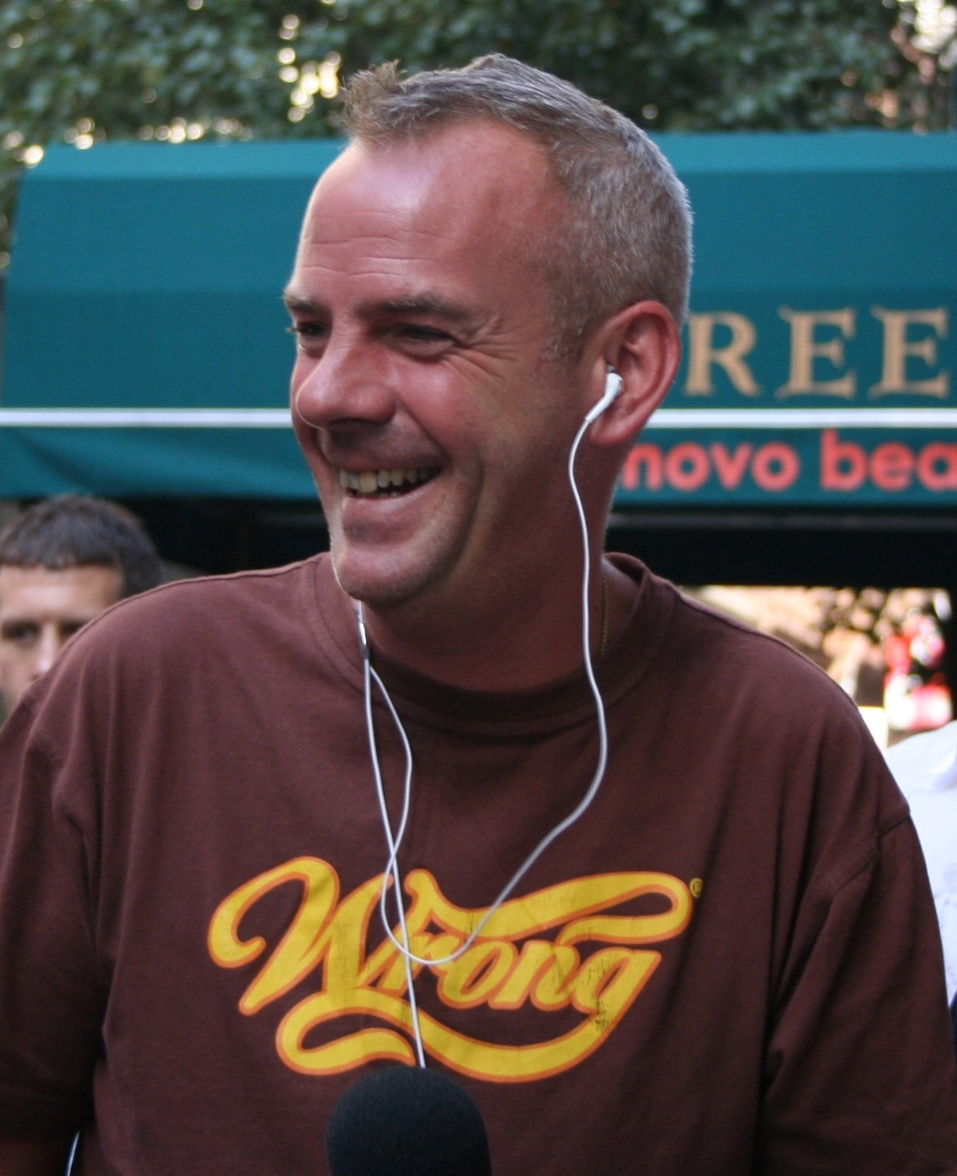
Norman Cook, better known as Fatboy Slim (pictured in 2006), served as producer of "Crazy Beat"

"Crazy Beat" was written and produced by Blur, with Cook also serving as a producer. Musically, it is a dance-pop and electropop track which is based on "rowdy" three-chords. Reviewers also noted the influence of big beat and nu metal into its composition. It also features a "big rock beat and fuzz-punk guitar", along with a "pounding percussion". According to Bram Teitelman of Billboard, the song is "one of the most guitar-driven songs of the enduring act's career" and noted that it was not representative of the rest of Think Tank, which found the band "dabbling in world music". Lúcio Ribeiro from Folha de S.Paulo wrote that it was "the rock track of the record". For The Observer's Kitty Empire, "Crazy Beat" was a "raw rock tune" with "dancefloor dynamics" added by Cook. It was seen by Steve Lowe of Q as Blur's take on "I Wanna Be Your Dog" (1969) by The Stooges.

"Crazy Beat" starts with a "trademark Fatboy Slim drum loop" and vocodered vocals which repeat the track's title, before shifting into "classic Blur, with deep, grumbling guitar and ferocious analog drums." Some journalists likened the vocodered voice to that of cartoon character Donald Duck; Jeff Elbel of Paste also commented that it resembles Rick Dees' "Disco Duck" (1976). During the chorus, Albarn shouts "yeah yeah yeah!". To many reviewers, "Crazy Beat" was reminiscent of Blur's "Song 2" (1997), as well as works by The Clash. Lyrically, it praises the effects of music and clubs on the people, in the "best music makes the people comes together style". The lyrics also namecheck the Central Intelligence Agency.

== Critical reception ==
"Crazy Beat" received mixed reviews from music critics. According to Nigel Williamson from Uncut, the song "bears the unmistakable cartoon signature of Fatboy Slim." Steve Lowe from Q deemed the track as "the album's prime Fatboy Slim moment", and stated that it was "surely a hit". Keith Phipps of The A.V. Club noted that the song "sounds like a deranged midget", and described it as a "poundingly ingratiating track". John Lamb of The Forum of Fargo-Moorhead described it as "pulsating", and wrote that it would "fill any listener's novelty fix". The Independent staff thought that "Crazy Beat" was a "second cousin" to "Song 2", pointing out its "ironic swagger". Also calling it a cousin to the aforementioned track, Russell Baillie of The New Zealand Herald described the track as "highly infectious meaty beaty big and bouncy". Bram Teitelman of Billboard stated that "the combination of Cook's production and the aggressive guitar riff gives 'Crazy Beat' a shot of adrenaline, and it seems destined to follow in the footsteps of 'Song 2' as a fixture at sporting events." Jeres from Playlouder said that it "packs a punch, and has lots of strange squelchy devil belches for your entertainment".

Kitty Empire from The Observer commented that the song was not "Blur's finest hour, nor Norman Cook's, but it will reassure Blur-watchers (and the record company) that the band haven't entirely disappeared up Albarn's world music collection." Classic Pop's Steve Harnell described it as "airhead fun", but felt that Think Tank's high points were "mostly found elsewhere". For NME's Alex Needham, the song "sounds like four old yobs making an exhibition of themselves in a disco". According to Andy Greenwald of Spin, the "escapist laddism" present on the track felt forced and hollow. Sharing a similar opinion, Sam Bloch from Stylus Magazine said that the song had a "hollow commercialism". Rob Brunner from Entertainment Weekly dismissed "Crazy Beat" as a "cartoon-voiced throwaway that’s neither deranged nor danceable". For his part, Stereogum's Ryan Leas felt it was "one of Blur’s lowest moments", and "a cartoonish retread of ideas they achieved better elsewhere"; Jeff Elbel of Paste also deemed "Crazy Beat" as "cartoonish".

Alexis Petridis from The Guardian called Cook's tracks on Think Tank, including "Crazy Beat", as "cluttered-sounding collaborations" which "fall short of their ambition", as well as "a disappointment". Devon Powers of PopMatters described it as an "energetic, punked-out rocker", although "as much as this song might appeal to the neo-DIY set — complete with its jumpy chorus and lively melody — Blur are anything but". John Murphy wrote for musicOMH that "Crazy Beat" "sits somewhat jarringly on the album"; he went on to say that it was "basically a Fatboy Slim remix of Song 2", and while it would probably be a commercial success, it "doesn’t sound quite right sat between the gorgeousness of Out Of Time and Good Song". For Slant Magazine's Sal Cinquemani, the song "ultimately sound[s] out of place" on the album. In a similar vein, Gareth James from Clash panned it as a "'hit-by-numbers' brash nonsense" which was "glaringly out of place" on Think Tank. Ben Gilbert from Dotmusic condemned the track, pointing out its "lazy, predictable, sub-'Song 2' primal noise and pointless, throwaway chorus", and asserting that it was "Think Tank's weakest moment by some considerable distance". Similarly, The Line of Best Fit's Thomas Hannan described it as a "sub-'Song 2' abomination". Julian Marshall wrote for BBC Newsbeat that "Crazy Beat" "[has] aged badly", and sounded like a novelty hit.

== Commercial performance ==
In the United Kingdom, "Crazy Beat" debuted at number 18 on the UK Singles Chart for the week dated 19 July 2003, before disappearing from the chart two weeks later. It later returned for a run of two weeks, totalling five weeks on the chart. Outside of the United Kingdom, the song attained lower positions; in Scotland, it reached number 26, while peaking at number 41 in Ireland and 20 in Sweden. In the United States, "Crazy Beat" reached number 22 on the Alternative Airplay chart, compiled by Billboard; it became Blur's first appearance on the chart since "Song 2", as well as their last until "The Narcissist" (2023). In Canada, the single also peaked at number 30 on the Canadian Hot 100 chart. Across the pan-Eurochart Hot 100 Singles, the track peaked at number 63 for the week dated 26 July 2003.

== Promotion ==
=== Music video ===
Two music videos were created to accompany the single's release. The first was directed by animation collective Shynola in late March 2003 at Ealing Studios in London and premiered through MTV's website the following month. It was also sent to rotation on MTV2 in May 2003. The visual sees the band performing the song in a pub as a green audio waveform comes to life while vibrating in time with the music. An alternate video was directed by John Hardwick; it shows four women performing a dance routine to the song, wearing matching brown dresses and blonde wigs.

=== Live performances ===
Although MTV reported Blur was annoyed to play the song on television shows at the time of its release, "Crazy Beat" was performed on Top of the Pops, Headliners and Supersonic. The song was also played during a series of shows supporting Think Tank in 2003.

== Track listings ==
UK 7-inch single

1. "Crazy Beat" – 3:14
2. "The Outsider" – 5:13

UK CD single and Australian maxi-single

1. "Crazy Beat" – 3:14
2. "Don't Be" – 2:39
3. "Crazy Beat" (alternative video) – 3:35

UK DVD single

1. "Crazy Beat" (video) – 3:22
2. "Don't Be" – 2:38
3. "The Outsider" – 5:13
4. "Crazy Beat" (animatic) – 1:56

Canadian CD single

1. "Crazy Beat" – 3:14
2. "Tune Two" – 3:48

== Credits and personnel ==
Credits and personnel are adapted from the Think Tank album liner notes.

- Damon Albarn – vocals, songwriter, producer, guitars, programming
- Alex James – songwriter, producer, bass, backing vocals
- Dave Rowntree – songwriter, producer, drums, programming
- Fatboy Slim – producer, keyboards, synths, programming, effects
- Ben Hillier – percussion, engineering, mixing
- Jason Cox – production assistant, engineering
- James Dring – additional engineering, programming

== Charts ==
Weekly chart performance for "Crazy Beat"
Chart (2003)	Peak position
Australia (ARIA)	102
Canada Hot 100 (Billboard)	30
Europe (Eurochart Hot 100)	63
Germany (GfK)	98
Ireland (IRMA)	41
Scottish Singles Sales (Official Charts)	26
Sweden (Sverigetopplistan)	20
UK Singles (Official Charts)	18
US Alternative Airplay (Billboard)	22

== Release history ==
Release dates and formats for "Crazy Beat"
Region	Date	Format(s)	Label	Ref.
United States	17 March 2003	Alternative radio	Virgin	
United Kingdom	7 July 2003	CD single; DVD single; 7"	Parlophone	
