= Gutkind =

Gutkind is a surname. Notable people with the surname include:

- Diana Gutkind, English Pianist and keyboardist.
- Eric Gutkind (1877–1965), German Jewish philosopher
- Erwin Anton Gutkind (1886–1968), German-Jewish architect and city planner
- Lee Gutkind, American writer, speaker and literary innovator
