= Out of Time (Blur song) =

2003 song by Blur

Single by Blur

from the album Think Tank
- Released: 14 April 2003
- Recorded: 2002
- Genre: Pop
- Length: 3:51
- Label: Parlophone
- Songwriters: Damon Albarn; Alex James; Dave Rowntree
- Producers: Blur; Ben Hillier

Blur singles chronology
"Don't Bomb When You Are the Bomb" (2002)	"Out of Time" (2003)	"Crazy Beat" (2003)

Music video
- "Out of Time" on YouTube

"Out of Time" is a song by English rock band Blur from their seventh studio album, Think Tank (2003). The song was written and produced by band members Damon Albarn, Alex James and Dave Rowntree, with Ben Hillier also serving as a producer. After being premiered via BBC Radio 1 on 3 March, it was released as the album's lead single on 14 April 2003, by Parlophone. The song became the band's first release without guitarist Graham Coxon. It is a pop ballad featuring acoustic guitars and bass, as well as a Moroccan orchestra. Lyrically, it deals with a civilisation that has lost touch, with Coxon's departure being referenced in the lyrics.

"Out of Time" received positive reviews from music critics, with some of them placing focus on Albarn's vocal performance. Commercially, the song was successful in the United Kingdom, where it peaked at number five, as well as attaining success in other European countries, peaking inside the top 10 in Scotland and the top 20 in Ireland and Sweden. The accompanying music video, directed by John Hardwick, does not feature the band members themselves in any way, being made up of footage from a 2002 BBC documentary titled Warship, exploring the lives of those serving on a warship. The video is centered around a young female aircraft maintenance technician. The song was played live at several concerts by Blur, including on their series of two shows at London's Hyde Park in 2009, as well as their concert directly after the 2012 Summer Olympics closing ceremony in the same city.

== Background and development ==
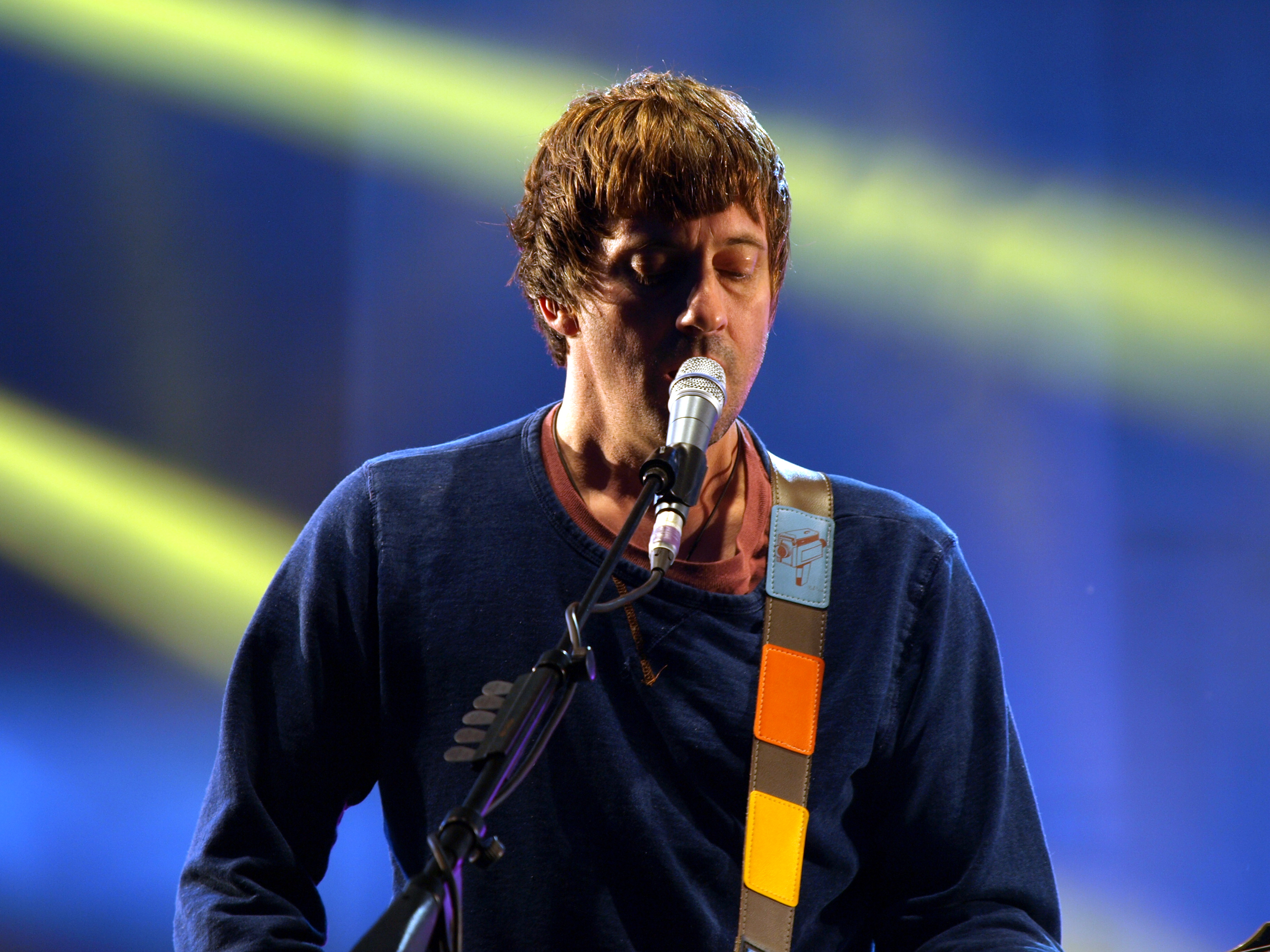
Graham Coxon left Blur during recording sessions for Think Tank in 2002.

Recording sessions for Blur's seventh studio album started in November 2001 in London with the absence of guitarist Graham Coxon, who had been battling alcoholism and depression, thus failing to turn up to the initial sessions. Coxon spent time, what he described as "awkward afternoons", contributing on some tracks on the album, but left the band in 2002 after he had a "mental breakdown" during these sessions. Coxon explained that "there were no rows" and "[Blur] just recognised the feeling that we needed some time apart". The remaining members of Blur decided to carry on recording, travelling to Morocco to continue recording the album, with the intention to "escape from whatever ghetto we're in and free ourselves by going somewhere new and exciting". The band settled at Marrakesh, where they built a studio together, which "brought everyone closer".

While in Marrakesh, Blur worked with Groupe Regional du Marrakech, who provided orchestral arrangement on "Out of Time". According to Ben Hillier, who produced the song, the orchestra's work was "astonishing"; he elaborated that "while I was setting the mics up, they started playing. All the chords sounded fantastic. And I looked out at the end of the session, and none of them had headphones on! What they were playing along to, I have no idea. They must have heard it through the door". In February 2003, it was revealed that the album would be titled Think Tank and the lead single "Out of Time" would be premiered on 3 March, on BBC Radio 1, followed by a commercial release on 14 April 2003, by Parlophone.

== Composition and lyrics ==
"Out of Time" was written and produced by band members Damon Albarn, Alex James and Dave Rowntree, with Hillier also serving as a producer. Musically, the song has been described as a pop ballad, featuring acoustic guitars and bass, as well as a Moroccan orchestra. It starts with a distant "aaaarrgh" in the opening seconds, before Albarn's unadulterated vocals and "steady, simplistic drums", as well as "ethereal, hard-to-identify" noises. In the middle of the track, an Andalucian string group and a tambourine are present.

Lyrically, the song deals with a civilisation that has lost touch, with Albarn singing, "you've been so busy lately, that you haven't had the time, to open up your mind and watch the world spinning, gently out of time". This lyric was also related to Coxon's departure from Blur. According to Stereogum's Michael Nelson, "Out of Time" shows Albarn "indulging a bit in his world-music explorations via Honest Jon's". He noted that the elements are blended with James's "loping" bass line, Rowntree's "relaxed" percussion and Albarn's "lazy" vocals.

== Critical reception ==
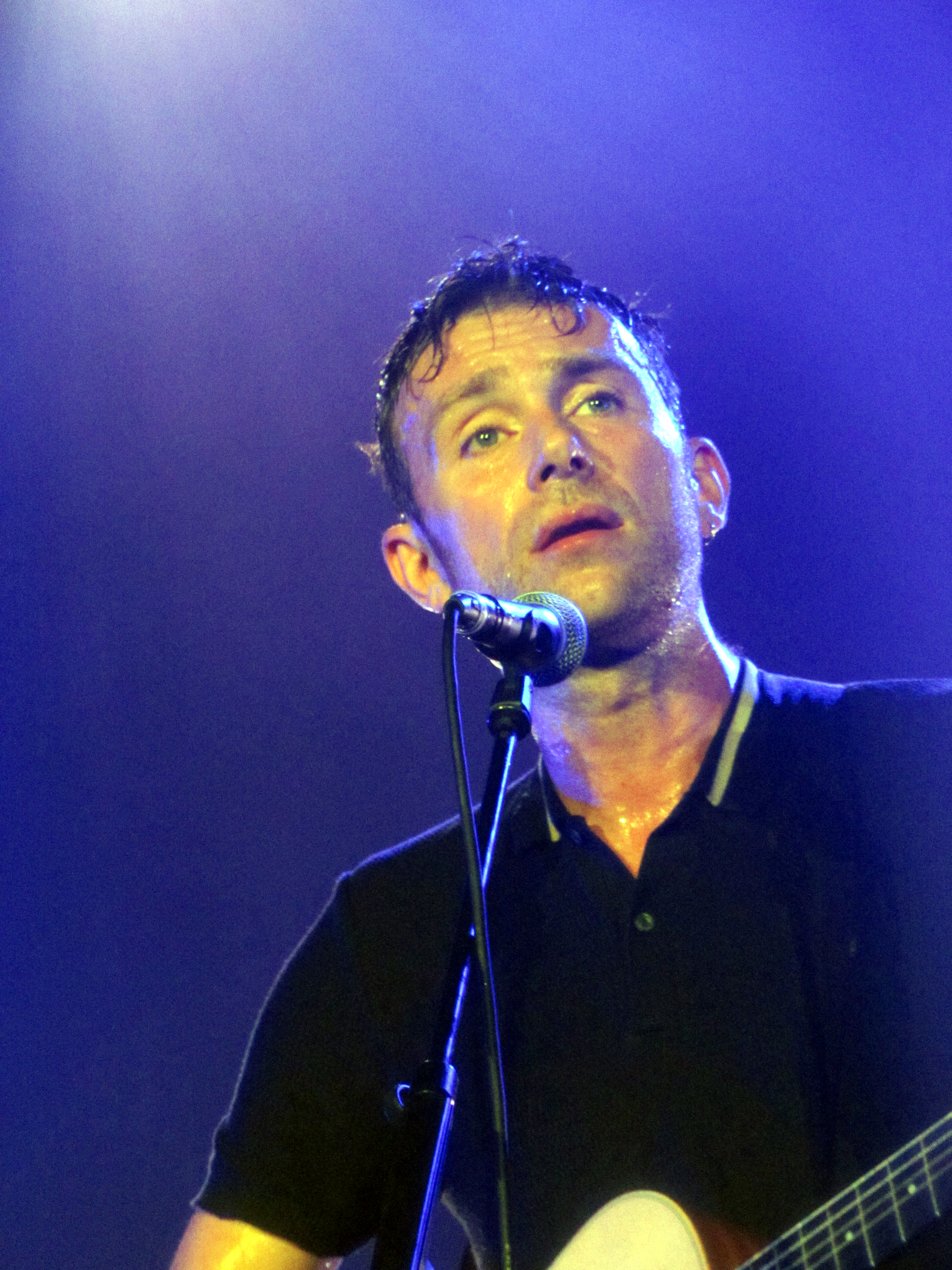
Some critics placed focus on Damon Albarn's vocal performance.

"Out of Time" was met with positive reviews from music critics. Alex Needham from NME called it the band's "most straightforwardedly touching single for ages", while Paul Moody from the same magazine praised the song too, stating that Albarn "sings in a voice so pure, clear and welcoming you want to have a shower in it", and "suddenly 'Songbird' doesn't sound so clever after all". Sal Cinquemani from Slant Magazine thought that "Out of Time" is "lovely", whereas Barry Walters from Rolling Stone called it a "gorgeously mournful single". Kitty Empire of The Observer called it an excellent example of Blur's emancipation, being "saturated with new sounds but faithful to melody". She also deemed the song "a great ballad, intimate and live-sounding, in the tradition of great Albarn ballads like 'Tender' or 'To the End'". According to BBC Music's Dan Tallis, the song is "a perfect pop song and the band struggle to better it". He continued saying that "you only have to listen to 'Out Of Time' a couple of times for it to become embedded in your brain; the dreamy vocals and gentle African drum beat soothe and calm your mind". Andy Greenwald from Spin claimed that "Out of Time" is "the album's highlight", describing the song as "failure-soaked" and "heart-stoppingly lovely".

Devon Powers of PopMatters described the track as "a much more straightforward, apace ballad" compared to the previous song on the album, "Ambulance". Rob Brunner from Entertainment Weekly commented that Albarn's "heartfelt vocals" make up for "sappy" lyrics, while Paste's Jeff Elbel called the track the finest moment on Think Tank. Andrew Future of Drowned in Sound commented that the song "is content to swoon around the string-laiden waves of its own longing beauty, but only reveals its full worth after repeated visits". Similarly, Jeres from Playlouder noted that it "is the best Blur single in ages, but it requires more than a few listens". Brent DiCrescenzo of Pitchfork called the song a "majestic, snaking" song, but noted that it "relies less on the lugubrious, Gibraltar-docked solo than the vast, four-dimensional environment surrounding it". Alexis Petridis from The Guardian deemed it a "doleful and world-weary on" song. In a less positive review, Stephen Thomas Erlewine of AllMusic called the track a "hushed, melancholic elegy in the same vein as 'To the End' and 'Tender', though not as good as either".

=== Accolades ===
Jazz Monroe from NME placed the song at number two on their list of Blur's greatest hits, saying it "magically thrusts Damon's romantic resignation into a delicate, geographically displaced tale of modern ennui, melting all but the stoniest hearts". Nelson also included it on his list of their 10 best songs, at number six, commenting it is "easily the warmest Blur single, and maybe the warmest song in their catalog, period". Whilst listing the band's 20 best songs, The Daily Telegraph placed the track at number 12. Drowned in Sound's Sean Adams included "Out of Time" on his list of Blur's favorite tracks, noting how Albarn's "humanity" on his voice "elevates this gentle, seemingly desolate song into something devastating and full of wonder". In October 2011, Rebecca Schiller of NME placed it at number 73 on their list "150 Best Tracks of the Past 15 Years", whilst the magazine placed the song at number eight on its list "Greatest Tracks of the Decade". Emily Barker from the same publication later ranked it the 499th best song ever.

== Commercial performance ==
In the United Kingdom, "Out of Time" debuted at number five on the UK Singles Chart for the week dated 20 April 2003, becoming the third best debut on the chart after Madonna's "American Life" and Robbie Williams' "Come Undone". It remained inside the chart for a total of 11 weeks. In April 2015, it was revealed by the Official Charts Company that "Out of Time" was the band's 14th most downloaded song in the region. The song was also successful in Scotland, reaching number seven on the Scottish Singles Chart. "Out of Time" attained moderate success in other European countries, peaking inside the top 20 in Ireland and Sweden. It experienced lower positions in Germany and Switzerland, reaching numbers 75 and 97, respectively.

== Music video ==
The accompanying music video was directed by John Hardwick, edited by Quin Williams and produced by Mike Wells through London-based production company Helen Langridge Associates (HLA). The video does not feature the band members themselves in any way, consisting entirely of footage from a 2002 BBC documentary titled Warship, exploring the lives of men and women serving on a warship. Albarn described the video as "the antithesis of the 'Top Gun' image of the American military machine", and added that the video "focuses on the loneliness of somebody working on an aircraft carrier and the fact that a six-month tour of duty means that relationships break down and children go without their parents. That's the reality of it". The visual premiered online on 7 April 2003. The video is centred around a woman who is separated from her partner (a marine serving on another ship) and her young son who remains at home in the United States.

The music video won Hardwick the "Wood Pencil" award for music video direction, as well as Williams the "Graphite Pencil" award for music video editing at the D&AD Awards in 2004.

== Live performances ==
"Out of Time" was performed by Blur on television shows such as CD:UK, Top of the Pops and Friday Night with Jonathan Ross in 2003. The song was also performed during a series of shows in London Astoria in May 2003, as well on the international tour supporting Think Tank. According to Nick Cowen from The Daily Telegraph, the performance was "one particularly sweet moment" from the show. The band performed the song during a series of two shows at London's Hyde Park on 3–4 July 2009. It was also performed at Blur's concert directly after the 2012 Summer Olympics closing ceremony on 13 August 2012 in London. "Out of Time" was added to the setlist of the tour in support of their eighth studio album The Magic Whip in 2015 and the band also performed it at their two Wembley Stadium shows in July 2023.

== Track listings ==
- UK 7-inch single
1. "Out of Time" – 3:53
2. "Money Makes Me Crazy" (Marrakech Mix) – 2:51
- UK and European DVD
1. "Out of Time" (video) – 3:55
2. "Money Makes Me Crazy" (Marrakech Mix) – 2:51
3. "Tune 2" – 3:47
4. "Out of Time" (director's commentary) – 1:48
- Japanese EP
1. "Out of Time" – 3:54
2. "Money Makes Me Crazy" (Marrakech Mix) – 2:51
3. "Tune 2" – 3:49
4. "Don't Be" – 2:41
5. "The Outsider" – 5:13
6. "Out of Time" (video) – 3:55
7. "Crazy Beat" (video) – 3:16

== Credits and personnel ==
Credits and personnel are adapted from the Think Tank album liner notes.

- Damon Albarn – vocals, writer, producer, guitars, programming
- Alex James – writer, producer, bass, backing vocals
- Dave Rowntree – writer, producer, drums
- Ben Hillier – producer, keyboards, samples

Orchestra

Group Regional du Marrakech

- Desyud Mustafa – orchestral arrangement
- Mohamed Azeddine (MD) – oud
- M. Rabet Mohamid Rachid – violin
- Bezzari Ahmed – rabab
- Gueddam Jamal – violin, cello
- Hijaoui Rachid – violin
- Moullaoud My Ali – oud
- Kassimi Jamal, Youssef – oud
- El Farani Mustapha – tere
- Abdellah Kekhari – violin
- Dalal Mohamed Najib – darbouka
- Ait Ramdam El Mostafa – kanoun

== Charts ==
=== Weekly charts ===
Weekly chart performance for "Out of Time"
Chart (2003)	Peak position
Australia (ARIA)	113
Europe (Eurochart Hot 100)	19
Germany (GfK)	75
Ireland (IRMA)	17
Italy (FIMI)	25
Scottish Singles Sales (Official Charts)	7
Sweden (Sverigetopplistan)	19
Switzerland (Schweizer Hitparade)	97
UK Singles (Official Charts)	5

=== Year-end charts ===
Yearly chart performance for "Out of Time"
Chart (2003)	Position
UK Singles (OCC)	163
