= Think Tank (Blur album) =

Studio album by Blur
- Released: 5 May 2003 (details)
- Recorded: November 2001 – November 2002 in London, Morocco and Devon
- Genres: Art rock; electronic; world
- Length: 56:04
- Label: Parlophone
- Producers: Ben Hillier; Blur; Norman Cook; William Orbit

Blur chronology
Blur: The Best Of (2000)	Think Tank (2003)	Midlife: A Beginner's Guide to Blur (2009)

Damon Albarn chronology
Laika Come Home (2002)	Think Tank (2003)	Democrazy (2003)

Singles from Think Tank
- 1. "Out of Time" Released: 14 April 2003; 2. "Crazy Beat" Released: 7 July 2003; 3. "Good Song" Released: 6 October 2003

Think Tank is the seventh studio album by the English rock band Blur, released on 5 May 2003. Continuing the jam-based studio constructions of the group's previous album, 13 (1999), the album expanded on the use of sampled rhythm loops and brooding, heavy electronic sounds. There are also heavy influences from dance music, hip hop, dub, jazz, and African music, an indication of songwriter Damon Albarn's expanding musical interests.

Recording sessions started in November 2001, taking place in London, Morocco and Devon, and finished a year later. The album's primary producer was Ben Hillier with additional production by Norman Cook (Fatboy Slim), and William Orbit. At the start of the sessions, guitarist Graham Coxon had been in rehab for alcoholism, so was not present. Initially unaware of how long Coxon would be in rehab for, Albarn, James and Rowntree decided to start work in the studio without Coxon.

After he re-joined, relationships between him and the other members became strained. After initial recording sessions, Coxon left, leaving little of his presence on the finished album. This is the only Blur album to not feature Coxon as a full-time member; he reunited with Damon Albarn in 2008, resulting in Blur starting to play live again in 2009, and returned to the band for their next album The Magic Whip (2015).

Think Tank is a loose concept album, which Albarn has stated is about "love and politics". Albarn, a pacifist, had spoken out against the invasion of Afghanistan and, after Western nations threatened to invade Iraq, took part in the widespread protests against the war. Anti-war themes are recurrent in the album as well as in associated artwork and promotional videos.

After leaking onto the internet in March, Think Tank was released on 5 May 2003 and entered the UK Albums Chart at number one, making it Blur's fifth consecutive studio album to reach the top spot. The album was later certified Gold. Think Tank also reached the top 20 in many other countries, including Austria, Switzerland, Germany, Norway and Japan. It was their highest charting album in the United States at the time, reaching number 56 on the Billboard 200. The album produced three singles, which charted at number 5, number 18 and number 22 respectively on the UK singles chart. After the album was released, Blur announced a world tour with Simon Tong filling in for Coxon.

== Background ==
Although Blur had been associated with the Britpop movement, they had experimented with different musical styles more recently, beginning with Blur (1997) which had been influenced by indie rock bands under the suggestion of guitarist Graham Coxon. Since the mid to late 1990s, Blur's members had been working on other projects as well as Blur: Albarn had co-created Gorillaz, a virtual band, in 1998 with comic artist Jamie Hewlett whom Albarn had met through Coxon. Gorillaz' 2001 debut was financially successful and received critical acclaim. Since composing the Blur song, "You're So Great", Coxon had started a solo career and as of 2001 had released three solo albums. The members' differing musical interests had alienated some of the band members, with Coxon explaining, "we're all very concerned for each other and we do genuinely like each other an awful lot. Because we're into so much different stuff, it becomes daunting." Nevertheless, Coxon, along with Alex James and Dave Rowntree were keen for a new album, whilst Albarn was more reluctant.

Blur's prior album, 13, had made heavy use of experimental and electronic music with the guidance of producer William Orbit. Despite the success of the album and its associated singles, the overall sound of the album had been deemed as "deliberately uncommercial" compared to their previous efforts. Despite the broader musical landscaping which Blur were engaging in, Albarn said in a January 2001 interview that he wanted to make a more accessible album again, stating "I'm trying to go back to the kind of songwriting aesthetic I had on (hit album) Parklife. They won't be arranged in the same way at all – they'll just be songs that are accessible to the public." He also explained his reasoning for this approach, stating that "it's too complicated being anything other than mainstream with Blur. That's where it belongs. We still feel that the mainstream in Britain is not represented well enough by intelligent musicians."

After the September 11 attacks, a series of controversial military campaigns were launched, known as the war on terror. In November 2001, shortly after the Invasion of Afghanistan, the MTV Europe Music Awards were held in Frankfurt, where Gorillaz won an award for Best Dance Act. As Albarn and Hewlett walked onto stage to make a speech, Albarn sported a T-shirt with the Campaign for Nuclear Disarmament logo on it. In Albarn's speech, he said "So, fuck the music. Listen. See this symbol here, [pointing to the t-shirt] this the symbol for the Campaign for Nuclear Disarmament. Bombing one of the poorest countries in the world is wrong. You've got a voice and you have got to do what you can about it, alright?"

In 2002, Iraq was under threat of invasion from western nations. Opposition from the public led to protests being organised by a number of organisations. Albarn, who has described himself as being anti-war, spoke out against the invasion, citing the lack of democratic process as an issue. Anti-war views had been shared with Albarn's parents and grandparents. His grandfather, Edward Albarn, had died after going on a hunger strike the previous year. Albarn has labelled his grandfather, father, and himself as conscientious objectors.

Albarn teamed up with Robert "3D" Del Naja of Massive Attack and various campaigns to raise awareness of the potential dangers of the UK's involvement in the war. Albarn was due to speak in Hyde Park on the rally in March 2003 when a million people took to the streets of London in protest at the imminent war. In the event, he was too emotional to deliver his speech.

== Recording ==
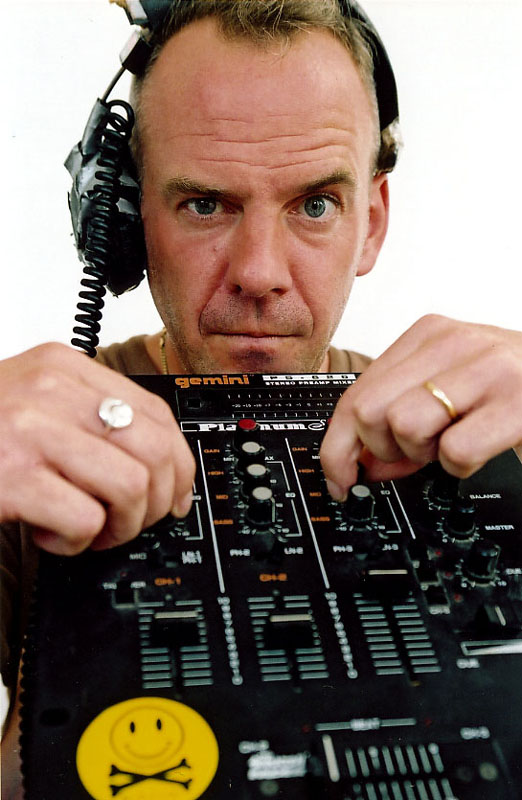
Norman Cook (often known as Fatboy Slim) produced the tracks "Crazy Beat" and "Gene By Gene"

Recording sessions for Think Tank started in November 2001 at Albarn's 13 Studio in London. Albarn, James and Rowntree had come to the studio along with Ben Hillier, who explained that "there was tension to begin with. Alex had made some belittling comment about Gorillaz in the press, but there was a 'fuck you' and a 'fuck you' and it was all mates again but for the fact that Graham was missing". During 2001, Coxon had been battling alcoholism and depression, and was unable to attend the initial recording session due to being in rehabilitation. Despite Coxon's absence, the rest of the band decided to start recording without him.

By January 2002, the rest of the band were mainly recording demos that Albarn had started on a four-track and subsequently transferred into Logic with 13's in-house engineers Tom Girling, Jason Cox and assistant, James Dring. Coxon rejoined the rest of the band for recording sessions in February and May 2002, with the foreknowledge that it would be "tense in the studio". Coxon spent, what he described as "awkward afternoons", contributing on the track "Battery in Your Leg", and non-album B-sides "The Outsider", "Morricone" and "Some Glad Morning".

It was clear that during Coxon's departure, the sound and musical direction was not to Coxon's taste, and he no longer had a justifiable place in the band. Additionally, Coxon was advised by health professionals to avoid touring, which would naturally leave him in a more vulnerable position mentally. This was not received well with the band, or their record label, due to touring being a major part of promoting and selling a record.

In what has been described as "miscommunication", Blur's manager was directed to tell Coxon to not return to the studio for an indefinite time, prompting Coxon to leave the band after these few recording sessions. The remaining members of Blur decided to carry on recording alone, Albarn stating that "the spirit of Blur was more important than the individuals".

In June, the band went back into the studio, doing "tracking, overdubs and reworking what we'd already done, and all the time new songs would be popping up – I think we had 28 of them at one point." Albarn desired to have multiple producers involved in the album, wanting to get a "name producer" involved. Albarn had previously been in talks with Norman Cook, commonly known as Fatboy Slim, to be involved on the record, although he originally wanted to contribute "just feedback and nothing else". Albarn eventually invited him to try and work with the band. Hillier and the band also spent time working with other producers, including the Dust Brothers, whilst the Neptunes were also reported to be involved at one point.

In August, the remaining members of Blur, along with Hillier, travelled to Morocco. James released a statement on the band's website saying "I suppose the idea at the bottom of this is to escape from whatever ghetto we're in and free ourselves by going somewhere new and exciting." The band settled at Marrakesh where they equipped an old barn with a studio. Albarn claimed that most of the album's lyrics were written "under a cypress tree in Morocco". The sessions in Marrakesh produced "Crazy Beat", "Gene by Gene", and "Moroccan Peoples Revolutionary Bowls Club". The vocal sessions took place at this time. While in Morocco, Albarn wrote a song about Cook and his partner, Zoë Ball, who were having troubles with their relationship. The song started out as a jam session, eventually evolving into "Put It Back Together", which ended up on Fatboy Slim's fourth studio album, Palookaville, which was released in October 2004. After the band came back from Morocco, the remaining sessions took place in a barn on National Trust land in Devon.

William Orbit, who was the main producer on 13 was also involved in the album's production, with Hillier stating that "we sent a couple of tunes to William to work on in his studio, working round the clock in a computer environment the way he does. He's a nutter and works all night. That was quite an interesting juxtaposition, us doing office hours then going to see William after work, just as he was getting up!" Of Orbit's productions, "Sweet Song" ended up on the album. Coxon's absence also bolstered the role of Alex James and Dave Rowntree who provided backing vocals throughout the album. Rowntree also played the electric guitar on "On the Way to the Club" and provided a rap on a demo version of "Sweet Song". A Moroccan orchestra is featured on the lead single, "Out of Time".

== Musical style ==
"Blur have reinvented themselves as boldly postcolonial popsters. Think Tank's songs aren't merely multicultural, they're multilateral, recorded partly in Morocco and sung in a musical polyglot Hoovered up from stray corners of the empire: aspects of Afrobeat, bits of bhangra, images of Islam. With guitarist Graham Coxon missing in action, the rhythm section of Alex James and Dave Rowntree steps up, and the album shuffles and grooves like Fela Kuti sloshed on gin and tonics."

— Andy Greenwald – Spin

Despite Albarn stating that he originally wanted to return to their more commercial sound, Think Tank continues the jam-based studio constructions of previous album 13. The album expanded on the use of sampled rhythm loops and brooding, heavy electronic sounds. Almost entirely written by Albarn, Think Tank placed more emphasis on lush backing vocals, simple acoustic guitar, drums, bass guitar, and a variety of other instruments.

"We knew we had to come back with the best thing we'd ever done," observed James. "I think it is. It's next level shit!"

Like many of Blur's previous albums, Think Tank is a loose concept album. Albarn has stated that it is an album about "love and politics", stating that "[Unease] forces people to value what they've got. And that, hopefully, will pay dividends and help change the world to a better place. Hopefully. Touch wood." Albarn also stated that the album is about "what are you supposed to do as an artist other than express what is going on around you." Some of the songs are concerned with a sense of paranoia and alienation in British club culture. Damon also cited punk rock music, particularly the Clash, as an inspiration.

"Ambulance"
Sample of "Ambulance" from Think Tank. Devon Powers of PopMatters described the song as "a fitting introduction to a record that's such an extreme departure from their past work".

The album's opening track, "Ambulance", starts off with a complex drum beat. Sam Bloch of Stylus Magazine praised the song's intro, describing the beat as "an offbeat rhythmic synapse that nearly collapses into itself [...] Heavy electronic drums. A flash. A kick. At first, it's really hard to believe that this is a song, functioning on its own. The beat needs crutches to stand upright." Devon Powers of PopMatters wrote that "the first bars [...] are stricken with throbbing beats that sound simultaneously futuristic and primitive." Bloch went on to write: "as a low, thunderous bass enters [the listener's] speakers, the whole thing slowly grows. Distinctive African percussion is leisurely incorporated into the bass overtone—it's the darkness in a thunderstorm, the pure, simple fury that comes before a glorious lightning streak."

At 0:52 Albarn's lead vocals come in, repeating the lyrics "I ain't got nothin' to be scared of" in a "gauzy" falsetto. This is accompanied by a "languid" bass groove and backing vocals described by Bloch as "gospel-twinged", as well as a baritone sax line described by Powers as "[cutting] underneath the back-up singers, at an angle—so quirky it feels like Morphine could have played it." As Albarn delivers the next line ("'cause I love you"), a synthesizer kicks in, described by stylus as "illustrious", "otherworldly" and "flooding the song's deathly stomp. But within this death there is love. Albarn makes this clear in the structure of this song." In Albarn's next vocal lines, he drops out of falsetto into "his low swinging monotone". Powers stated that he "croons, carelessly, almost as if he's freestyling. Things change again. They keep changing." Powers speculated that the song was about love but said "it's also a fitting introduction to a record that's such an extreme departure from their past work, and so drastically left field from the garage and post-punk and easily accessible poprock currently drenching the airwaves".

In an XFM radio interview, Albarn spoke on the composition of the track, stating, "I try to do a lot of stuff once I've got the melody and the chord structure. I try to just sing it in one go without thinking about it too much. It comes out a sort of partially formed song and sometimes you're lucky and it comes out almost kind of sort of perfect and sometimes it's just a mess." He stated that this was a case of the former. James said that "Ambulance" was "the first song that I thought, right this is Blur again. Like I'm in the right place again. I suppose the lyrics have something to do with that, you know, having nothing to be scared of anymore."

Greenwald claimed that "Out of Time" was "the album's highlight". Describing the song as "failure-soaked" and "heart-stoppingly lovely", Greenwald went on to say that it "perfectly captures the jumble of beauty and dread that defines life under orange alert. "Are we out of time?" Albarn asks, desperate for one last peace march or one last snog." Powers described the song as "a much more straightforward, apace ballad [compared to the previous song]. Dominant in the track are Albarn's unadulterated vocals and steady, simplistic drums, but beyond that are ethereal, hard-to-identify noises. In the middle of the track, an Andalucian string group rears its head, as does a tambourine."

"Crazy Beat" was compared to "Song 2" from the band's self-titled album. XFM described the song as "Fatboy Slim meets Middle Eastern Punk rock ... energetic, punked-out rocker. But as much as this song might appeal to the neo-DIY set—complete with its jumpy chorus and lively melody—Blur are anything but. If there's one thing Blur are known for, it's lots and lots and lots of production. Norman Cook (aka Fatboy Slim), builds this number with tons of sound, so there's always another active level to uncover." According to Albarn, the song "started off in such a different way. The nearest thing I could compare it to is a really bad version of Daft Punk. So, we got sick of it and then put in that descending guitar line over it to rough it up a bit." He also stated "It had this sort of mad vocoder-ish vocal and the melody was over a real sort of skanky groove and just this almost descending semi tonal guitar. The melody worked over it and it was amazing coz it shouldn't have worked, another little magic moment for us."

Powers claimed that "the best moments of this album are those when vintage Blur styles are evoked with new expertise. The meandering "Good Song" is a beautiful case in point. Acoustic guitar picking is matched with temperate drums and a sweet, steady bass countermelody. Albarn's singing is mostly in his mid-range, falling out as easily as breath. Signature background vocal harmonies are there to brighten up the track, but their muted nature doesn't descend into campiness. What's also new is the expert use of electronic noises and drumbeats to fatten the sound." Albarn said "well, that was originally called 'De La Soul' on our huge list of songs, half finished ideas. It was called 'De La Soul you know, right until the end. And I just always thought it was a good song and just called it 'Good Song'. I love that, I love the sort of intimacy of it and I just think everyone really played gently on it, the melodies. It was a good melody."

"On the Way to the Club" was described by Albarn as "a hangover song which we sort of write from time to time." Albarn also said that "it's definitely got a very individual sound. Someone said that it's a sort of revived Screamadelica. Yeah, it's kind of the good intentions of which you participate in revelry and then actually the reality of it."

"Brothers and Sisters" was one of the last additions to the album. "It was a kind of track that took quite a different direction for most of its life", said Rowntree. "...And then right at the end we switched about and took it in a different direction, it wasn't quite so dark." "It sounded more like The Velvet Underground when we started", claimed Albarn. "It was too overtly about one thing. It was too druggy, in a way, which is a kind of weird thing, 'cause the song is all about drugs so I think we just pushed ourselves a bit more with it and gave it a lot more space – countered by the list and the list was kind of sort of inspired by the life of JFK and his need to have 28 drugs everyday of his Presidency just to keep him functioning."

Albarn described "Caravan" as "a kind of song that you could play anywhere. And I mean I remember we just finished it and when everyone left to go back to London, I went down to Mali for a couple of days 'cause Honest Jon's [were] still working with musicians and stuff. I was sitting in a mango grove with a wild turkey and had a little CD player and I put it on there. It was just nice seeing everyone sitting around getting stoned to it. It was nice, 'cause the guitar is very, much inspired by Afel; a great Malian tradition of blues guitar." "I think this one's about the sun going down, for me", James claimed. "That was like a perfect studio moment; sitting on top of a strange barn in the Moroccan desert listening to Damon do a vocal and it a was a perfectly still time of day and the sun was perfectly red and there was just an immense sense of calm and this music."

Albarn claimed that "Sweet Song" was inspired by Coxon. Explaining the habit of putting 'song' in the title, Albarn stated that it was "another African thing that I've picked up. They do call things like 'Tree Song'. You know what I mean; they give it something quite simple. It's not, it doesn't have an agenda so much, it's offered out as a nice bit of music to everyone and that's something that has changed massively in my life, I don't see the ownership of things quite so strongly anymore."

There is a hidden track, "Me, White Noise" in the pregap before track 1 on some CD copies. The song guest features Phil Daniels, who previously appeared on "Parklife", on vocals. Japanese versions of the album feature the song at track 30, after silent tracks at index points 15–29. On the Blur 21 edition, the hidden track is placed after a few minutes of silence at the end of the last track.

The case contains a Parental Advisory logo in some regions, because "Brothers and Sisters" contains many drug references. Also, the hidden track "Me, White Noise" is one of the few Blur songs to contain an expletive.

== Artwork and packaging ==
The album cover was stenciled by the graffiti artist Banksy. Despite Banksy stating that he normally avoids commercial work, he later defended his decision to do the cover, saying: "I've done a few things to pay the bills, and I did the Blur album. It was a good record and [the commission was] quite a lot of money. I think that's a really important distinction to make. If it's something you actually believe in, doing something commercial doesn't turn it to shit just because it's commercial. Otherwise you've got to be a socialist rejecting capitalism altogether, because the idea that you can marry a quality product with a quality visual and be a part of that even though it's capitalistic is sometimes a contradiction you can't live with. But sometimes it's pretty symbiotic, like the Blur situation." The album's cover art sold at auction in 2007 for £75,000. The foldout booklet of the album features the text "Celebrity Harvest", which was the working name for a proposed, but ultimately unmade Gorillaz film. The name of the album comes from bassist Alex James who said in a 2003 interview, "It seemed to sum everything up."

== Release ==
Prior to the album's official release, it was leaked onto the internet. Rowntree said "I'd rather it gushed" and "I'm rabidly pro the internet and as many people hearing our albums as possible. If it hadn't been leaked by someone we probably would've leaked it ourselves". Albarn speculated that the leak helped the reception of their live shows, due to the songs' lyrics being more familiar to the audience.

=== Commercial performance ===
The album debuted in the US at number 56 with first-week sales of 20,000, becoming the highest peak of any Blur album in the US at that time. It has sold 94,000 copies in the US as of April 2015.

In the UK, the album debuted at the top spot, becoming their fifth consecutive number one album. The album remained in the top 10 for three weeks and the top 75 for a total of eight weeks, lacking the longevity and sales success of their previous releases.

=== Critical reception ===
Professional ratings
Aggregate scores
Source	Rating
Metacritic	83/100
Review scores
Source	Rating
AllMusic	2/5 stars
Entertainment Weekly	C+
The Guardian	4/5 stars
Los Angeles Times	3/4 stars
NME	8/10
Pitchfork	9.0/10 (2003); 8.5/10 (2012)
Q	4/5 stars
Rolling Stone	4/5 stars
Spin	A
Uncut	5/5 stars

Think Tank received mostly positive reviews. At Metacritic, which assigns a normalised rating out of 100 to reviews from mainstream critics, the album received an average score of 83, which indicates "universal acclaim", based on 26 reviews. Drowned in Sound writer Andrew Future deemed the album "a genuine pleasure to behold" and whilst stating that previous albums Blur and 13 were "full of jump-start arrangements and fractured experimentalism", he described Think Tank as being "lush in melody, flowing in windswept electronica with a myriad of bombastic orchestral backing one minute, before retracting into cocoons of melancholic and clustered acoustics the next." Playlouder called the album "an extraordinary record that pushes boundaries and sets new standards." "The beat-driven tracks," observed Steve Lowe in Q, "veer towards the arty, white-boy-with-beatbox line of Talking Heads and The Clash (actually, the low-slung hip-pop of 'Moroccan Peoples Revolutionary Bowls Club' even recalls Big Audio Dynamite). Only the trudging, tedious six-minute squib 'Jets' really needs taking back to the shops." However, Stephen Thomas Erlewine of AllMusic wrote that the album "is the sound of Albarn run amuck, a (perhaps inevitable) development that even voracious Blur supporters secretly feared could ruin the band — and it has." He also described Think Tank as a "lousy album" on which the few strong tracks are "severely hurt by Coxon's absence".

Albarn became critical of the record over time. In 2015 he said: "It's... got some real stinkers on it – there's some bollocks on there."

=== Accolades ===
Blur received a number of awards and nominations for Think Tank. At the 2003 Q Awards, Think Tank won the award for Best Album. This was the third time the band had received this award, previously winning in 1994 and 1995 for Parklife and The Great Escape respectively. Blur also received nomination for Best Act in the World Today and, along with Ben Hillier, were nominated in the Best Producer category. The album also won in the Best Album category at the South Bank Show Awards in 2004 and was nominated in a similarly titled category at the Danish Music Awards the same year. Think Tank was nominated for Best British Album at the 2004 Brit Awards. The promo videos for "Out of Time" and "Good Song" also won several awards.

At the end of the year, The Observer listed Think Tank as the best album of 2003, Miranda Sawyer writing that, "Think Tank is the band's first warm album. They have hopped genres in the past, from baggy to mod to pop to grunge to art-rock, but the sound has always stayed urban, Western, cool. Think Tank is none of these things. It's all over the place, and that place is foreign. Odd noises, strange instruments, keening vocals; its tunes wind themselves around your heart like drifting smoke. They waft in from faraway lands; trail and trickle their scent across your life. It is the most peculiar stuff that stays with you; "Ambulance"'s slurred symphony; "Caravan"'s star-speckled wonder."

Accolades for Think Tank
Publication	Country	Accolade	Year	Rank
Bang	UK	Albums of the Year	2003	3
BBC	UK	Albums of the Year	2003	*
Drowned in Sound	UK	Albums of the Year	2003	43
Eye Weekly	Canada	Albums of the Year (Critics Poll)	2003	23
Eye Weekly	Canada	Albums of the Year (Writers)	2003	11
Fnac	France	The 1000 Best Albums of All Time	2008	799
Les Inrockuptibles	France	The 100 Albums of the 2000s	2010	7
Mojo	UK	Albums of the Year	2003	3
NME	UK	Albums of the Year	2003	21
NME	UK	Top 100 Albums of the 2000s	2009	20
The Observer	UK	Albums of the Year	2003	1
Playlouder	UK	Albums of the Year	2003	18
PopMatters	US	Albums of the Year	2003	7
Q	UK	Albums of the Year	2003	2
Q	UK	Top 100 Albums of the 2000s	2009	59
Rolling Stone	US	Albums of the Year	2003	*
Rolling Stone	France	The 20 Albums of the 2000s	2010	*
Rough Trade	UK	Albums of the Year	2003	86
Slant Magazine	US	Top 250 Albums of the 2000s	2010	145
Spin	US	Albums of the Year	2003	16
Uncut	UK	Albums of the Year	2003	62
Uncut	UK	Top 150 Albums of the 2000s	2009	22

== Tour ==
After the album's release, Blur went on a world tour with former The Verve's guitarist and keyboardist Simon Tong filling in for Coxon on guitar, in both new and old songs. However, Albarn later said that he felt the live shows were "rubbish" and bassist Alex James admitted that touring was not the same without Coxon.

Since Blur's reunion with Coxon in 2009, the album has largely been absent from Blur's setlists, with the exception of "Out of Time" (in a new arrangement with additional guitar parts by Coxon) and occasional performances of "Battery in Your Leg" in 2009 and "Caravan" in 2015.

== Track listing ==
All tracks are written by Damon Albarn/Alex James/Dave Rowntree except where noted.

Think Tank track listing
No.	Title	Writer(s)	Length
0.	"Me, White Noise"		6:40
1.	"Ambulance"		5:09
2.	"Out of Time"		3:52
3.	"Crazy Beat"		3:15
4.	"Good Song"		3:09
5.	"On the Way to the Club"	Albarn, James, Rowntree, James Dring	3:48
6.	"Brothers and Sisters"		3:47
7.	"Caravan"		4:36
8.	"We've Got a File on You"		1:03
9.	"Moroccan Peoples Revolutionary Bowls Club"		3:03
10.	"Sweet Song"		4:01
11.	"Jets"	Albarn, James, Rowntree, Mike Smith	6:25
12.	"Gene by Gene"		3:49
13.	"Battery in Your Leg" ( (Note: The streaming and deluxe editions include "Me, White Noise" as a hidden track after "Battery in Your Leg" and 90 seconds of silence.))	Albarn, Graham Coxon, James, Rowntree	3:20
Total length:			56:04

Notes

Disc 2: 2012 special edition
No.	Title	Length
1.	"Money Makes Me Crazy" (Marrakech mix)	2:53
2.	"Tune 2"	3:48
3.	"The Outsider"	5:14
4.	"Don't Be"	2:40
5.	"Morricone"	4:50
6.	"Me, White Noise" (alternate version)	6:44
7.	"Some Glad Morning"	4:19
8.	"Don't Be" (acoustic mix)	2:39
9.	"Sweet Song" (demo)	3:50
10.	"Caravan" (XFM session)	4:15
11.	"End of a Century" (XFM session)	2:41
12.	"Good Song" (XFM session)	3:31
13.	"Out of Time" (XFM session)	3:36
14.	"Tender" (XFM session)	6:21

Japanese bonus track
No.	Title	Length
15.	"Crazy Beat" (Jo Whiley BBC session)	3:12

== Personnel ==
Blur

- Damon Albarn – lead and backing vocals, guitars, keyboards
- Alex James – bass guitar, backing vocals
- Dave Rowntree – drums, drum programming, backing vocals, guitar on "On the Way to the Club"

Additional musicians

- Mike Smith – saxophone on "Ambulance", "Caravan", and "Jets"; "gloom tubes" on "Caravan"
- Groupe Regional de Marrakech – orchestra on "Out of Time"
  - Desyud Mustafa – orchestral arrangement
  - Mohamed Azeddine – oud
  - M. Rabet Mohamid Rachid – violin
  - Bezzari Ahmed – rabab
  - Gueddam Jamal – violin and cello
  - Hijaoui Rachid – violin
  - Moullaoud My Ali – oud
  - Kassimi Jamal Youssef – oud
  - El Farani Mustapha – tere
  - Abdellah Kekhari – violin
  - Dalal Mohamed Najib – darbouka
  - Ait Ramdan El Mostafa – kanoun
- Ben Hillier – additional percussion on "On the Way to the Club"; "gloom tubes" on "Caravan"
- Paul Wood – bongos
- Graham Coxon – guitars on "Battery in Your Leg"
- Phil Daniels – backing vocals on "Me, White Noise"

Technical personnel

- Blur – production (all tracks)
- Ben Hillier – production, engineering, mixing (all tracks)
- Norman Cook – production on "Crazy Beat" and "Gene by Gene"
- William Orbit – production on "Sweet Song"
- Jason Cox – production assistance, additional engineering
- James Dring – programming
- Banksy – artwork and direction

== Charts and certifications ==
=== Weekly charts ===
Weekly charts for Think Tank
Chart (2003)	Peak position
Australian Albums (ARIA)	30
Austrian Albums (Ö3 Austria)	19
Belgian Albums (Ultratop Flanders)	19
Belgian Albums (Ultratop Wallonia)	9
Canadian Albums (Nielsen SoundScan)	31
Danish Albums (Hitlisten)	11
Dutch Albums (Album Top 100)	52
European Albums (Billboard)	3
Finnish Albums (Suomen virallinen lista)	15
French Albums (SNEP)	11
German Albums (Offizielle Top 100)	8
Irish Albums (IRMA)	3
Italian Albums (FIMI)	4
Japanese Albums (Oricon)	14
New Zealand Albums (RMNZ)	27
Norwegian Albums (VG-lista)	18
Portuguese Albums (AFP)	28
Spanish Albums (PROMUSICAE)	31
Swedish Albums (Sverigetopplistan)	44
Swiss Albums (Schweizer Hitparade)	9
UK Albums (Official Charts)	1
US Billboard 200	56

=== Year-end charts ===
Year-end charts for Think Tank
Chart (2003)	Position
UK Albums (OCC)	93

=== Certifications ===
Certifications for Think Tank
Region	Certification	Certified units/sales
United Kingdom (BPI)	Gold	100,000^{^}
Summaries
^{^} Shipments figures based on certification alone.
