= Good Song =

2003 single by Blur

- 7-inch, CD cover

Single by Blur

from the album Think Tank
- B-side: "Me, White Noise" (alternate version), "Morricone"
- Released: 6 October 2003
- Recorded: Marrakesh, 2002
- Length: 3:09
- Label: Parlophone
- Songwriters: Damon Albarn, Alex James, Dave Rowntree
- Producers: Blur, Ben Hillier

Blur singles chronology
"Crazy Beat" (2003)	"Good Song" (2003)	"Fool's Day" (2010)

Music video
- "Good Song" on YouTube

"Good Song" is a song by English rock band Blur and is the fourth track on their seventh studio album, Think Tank (2003). In October 2003, the song was released as the third and final single from that album, peaking at number 22 on the UK Singles Chart. The single was Blur's lowest placing single since 1993's "Sunday Sunday", ending the bands consecutive run of Top 20 singles. The promo video is an awarded animation directed by David Shrigley and the group Shynola. "Good Song" was originally called "De La Soul" after the hip-hop group. Damon Albarn would later collaborate with members of De La Soul for the Gorillaz singles "Feel Good Inc." and "Superfast Jellyfish". Graham Coxon, who had previously left the group, plays on the single's B-side "Morricone".

== Track listings ==
- 7-inch
1. "Good Song"
2. "Morricone"
- CD
1. "Good Song"
2. "Me, White Noise" (alternate version)
- DVD
1. "Good Song" (video)
2. "Me, White Noise" (alternate version)
3. "Morricone"
4. "Good Song" (animatic)

== Production credits ==
- "Good Song", "Me, White Noise" (alternate version) and "Morricone" produced by Blur and Ben Hillier
- Damon Albarn: Lead Vocals, Guitar, Synthesizers
- Alex James: Bass Guitar, Backing Vocals
- Dave Rowntree: Drum Machine, Backing Vocals
- Ben Hillier: Turntables

== Charts ==
Chart (2003)	Peak position
Scotland Singles (OCC)	29
UK Singles (OCC)	22

== See also ==
- List of anti-war songs
