= Diana Gutkind =

Diana Gutkind is an English pianist and keyboardist.

Gutkind worked as a session musician with bands such as Sandals, before joining Blur as their live keyboardist in 1995. She took over the part of Cara Tivey. She stayed with the band up to their 2000 Best of concert tour. She played numerous gigs with the band and can be seen with the band on the Singles Night concert video, and be heard on the live version of "Beetlebum" that appeared on the Tibetan Freedom Concert album, and Live at the Budokan.

In 2004, she played keyboards on Something Ilk by Cathy Davey. In 2005, she played piano on two tracks from Before the Poison by Marianne Faithfull.

She is currently in the band Mesmerise with Scottish free jazz singer, Maggie Nicols.
