= Three-chord song =

Song built around three chords played in a certain sequence

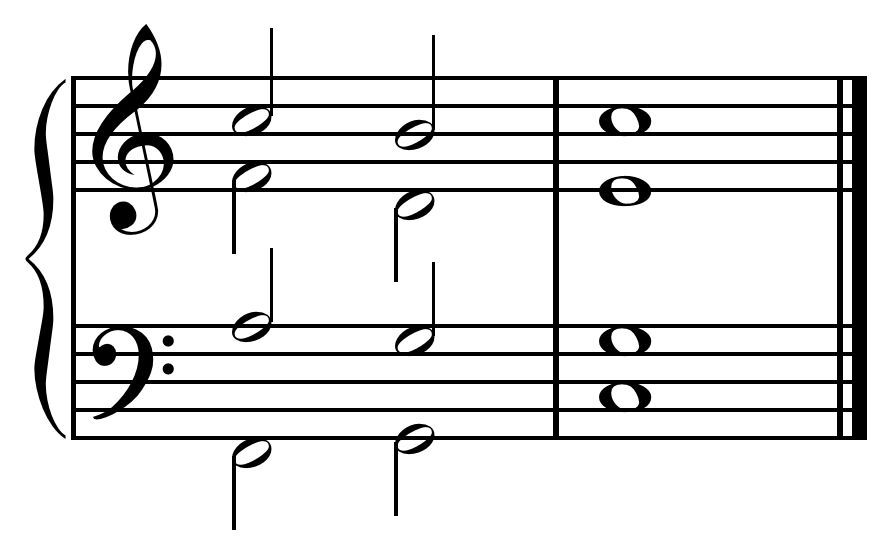
IV-V-I progression in C

A three-chord song is a song whose music is built around three chords played in some sequence. A common type of three-chord song is the simple twelve-bar blues used in blues and rock and roll.

Typically, the three chords used are the chords on the tonic, subdominant, and dominant (scale degrees I, IV and V): in the key of C, these would be the C, F and G chords. Sometimes the V^{7} chord is used instead of V, for greater tension.

The I (tonic), IV (subdominant) and V (dominant) chords (primary triads) together encompass all seven tones of the tonic's major scale. These three chords are a simple means of covering many melodies without the use of passing notes.

The order of the chord progression may be varied; popular chord progression variations using the I, IV and V chords of a scale are:

- I – IV – V
- IV – I – V
- I – IV – I – V
- I – IV – V – IV

Beside the I, IV and V chord progression, other widely used 3-chord progressions are:

- I – vi – V
- I – ii – V

== Quotes ==
Songwriter Harlan Howard once said "country music is three chords and the truth."

Lou Reed said "One chord is fine. Two chords is pushing it. Three chords and you're into jazz." Reed nevertheless wrote many songs with unique or complex chord progressions himself, such as the material on Berlin.

== See also ==
- Cadence (music)
- I–V–vi–IV progression
- Twelve-bar blues
