= Lev Gutkin =

Soviet radio engineer

Lev Solomonovich Gutkin
- Born: Lev Solomonovich Gutkin; Лев Соломонович Гуткин; 22 November 1914; Tomsk, Russian Empire
- Died: 9 February 2011 (aged 96); Moscow, Russia
- Occupation: specialist in the field of radio engineering
- Children: 2

Lev Solomonovich Gutkin (Russian: Лев Соломонович Гуткин; 22 November 1914 – 9 February 2011) was a Russian scientist and a specialist in the field of radio engineering and the theory of radio reception. Professor, Doctor of Technical Sciences, Honoured worker of Science and Technology of the Russian Soviet Federative Socialist Republic, and laureate of USSR State Prize.

== Biography ==
Lev Solomonovich Gutkin was born on 22 November 1914. In 1931 he graduated from Moscow Telephone Technical School. In 1932 he entered and in 1937 graduated to the Electrophysical Faculty of Moscow Power Engineering Institute, majoring in radio engineering. His thesis project was nominated for Academician Petrov Award. He continued his studies at the institute in the Department of Radio Receiving Devices in the development of radio compasses. In 1940, Gutkin defended his Candidate of Sciences thesis, which was dedicated to the issues of superregenerative radio reception.

In July 1941, although having heart disease, he volunteered to serve in Red Army. At the rank of private he fought in a radio company of a tank division in the southwestern direction of the Kalinin Front. He was promoted to the rank of junior lieutenant and was assigned to the post of radio control assistant to the commander of the armored mechanized forces of Kalinin Front. In 1943, the State Defense Committee, on the petition of Valeria Golubtsova, director of the Moscow Power Engineering Institute, he was recalled together with the group of young specialists to work there.

After the war, Gutkin led the research work in the institute related to the analysis and development of complex radio engineering systems. This work played a big role in the development of radio engineering in the USSR. In 1952, Gutkn defended his doctoral dissertation, which in 1953 was published in the form of a monograph under the title "Transformation and detection of ultrahigh frequencies". In 1956 he was awarded the academic title of professor.

In 1961, Gutkin was appointed as the head of the newly established Department of Radio Engineering Systems at the Moscow Power Engineering Institute and held this position until 1984.

Gutkin contributed to the development of the theory of optimal radio reception methods for complex interference, the theory of optimizing systems and devices for a combination of quality indicators, radio control systems. The theory of optimal radio reception is now widely used in space communications, cellular telephones and in receivers of the satellite radio navigation system Glonass.

He died on 9 February 2011 in Moscow.
