= James Jarvis (illustrator) =

British illustrator and toy designer

James Jarvis (born London, 1970) is a British illustrator and toy designer, a pioneer of the soft vinyl designer toy revolution.

Jarvis began his career as a designer for the fashion company Silas. He created characters at his own company, Amos Toys, each character with its own personality and background world. He now works as a freelance illustrator.

== Education ==
Jarvis was educated at Dulwich College, London. After a foundation course at Chelsea College of Arts he went on to study illustration at the University of Brighton (1990–1993) and took a master's degree in illustration at the Royal College of Art (1993–1995).

== Career ==
- 1994: freelance illustrator
- 1998: begins collaboration with London fashion company Silas, designing a moulded plastic toy, Martin
- 1999: more Silas toys, Evil Martin and Bubba Silas
- 2000: exhibition at PARCO Gallery, Tokyo, later at Nagoya, of 'World of Pain', an imaginary environment invented for Silas
- 2000: World of Pain comic launched
- 2000: new toy Tattoo-Me Keith, for Silas
- 2001: Lars World of Pain, for Silas
- 2002: Juvenile Delinquents characters for Sony Capsule Toy
- 2002: book James Jarvis Drawings published
- 2002: With Sofia Prantera and Russell Waterman (directors of Silas), sets up Amos Toys
- 2003: three sets of In-Crowd toys for Amos: Forever Sensible Motorcycle Club, Ages of Metal and Zombies
- 2003-2007: King Ken (ape icon), Vortigern's Machine, the Great Sage of Wisdom, Tales From Green Fuzz, Rusty, Wiggs, Yod's Micro Theatre of Dreams
- August 2006: with Liberty of London, creates Vortigern's Machine and The Great Sage of Wisdom displays in the menswear department of Liberty's Regent Street, London, store
- January 2007: exhibition at Festival International de la Bande Dessinee, Angoulême, France
- March 2007: launches blogspot at jamesjarvis.blogspot.com: "An insight into artistic genius, or the rantings of a madman on the road to oblivion? You decide!"
- April 2007: runs in Zürich Marathon
- April 2011: Collaborated with Coca-Cola for their 125th Anniversary
- February 2012: 'Fifty-Two Spheres' - solo Exhibition at Beach London Gallery, Shoreditch
- June 2013: 'Objects in Space' - solo Exhibition at Beach London Gallery, Shoreditch
- James Jarvis Drawings (Relax Book, Tokyo, 2002)
- Vortigern's Machine and the Great Sage of Wisdom (Amos Novelties Ltd, 2006)
- Yodzine (Amos Novelties Ltd, 2007)
- Selected Drawings (Amos Novelties Ltd, 2008)
