= Blur (band) =

English rock band

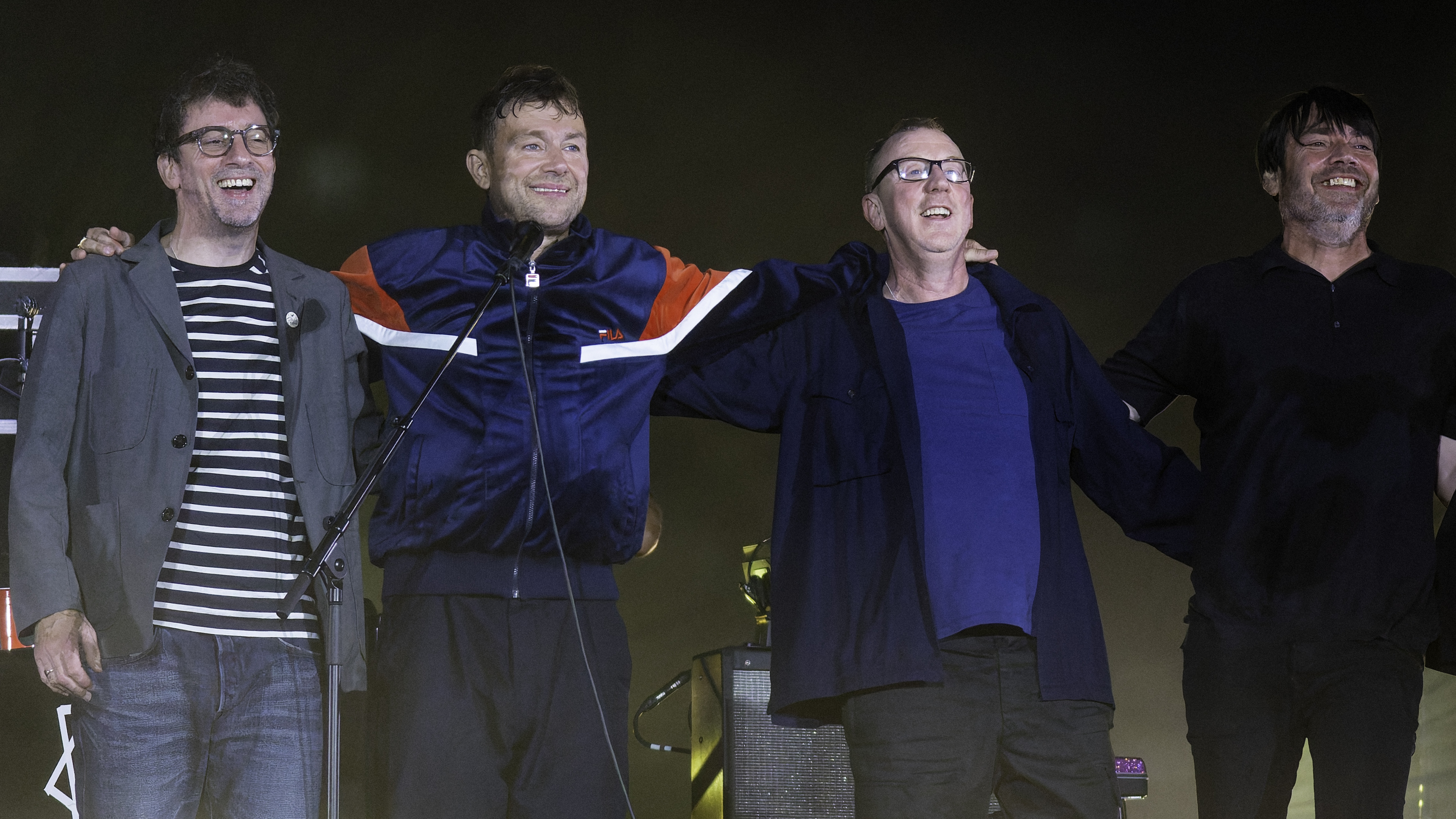
- Blur at Wembley Stadium in 2023. From left to right: Graham Coxon, Damon Albarn, Dave Rowntree and Alex James

Background information
- Also known as: Seymour (1988–1990)
- Origin: London, England
- Genres: Britpop; alternative rock; indie rock; art rock
- Works: Discography; songs
- Years active: 1988–2003; 2009–2015; 2023–present
- Labels: Food; Parlophone; Virgin; SBK; Warner; Live Here Now
- Spinoffs: Gorillaz; The Ailerons
- Spinoff of: Circus
- Awards: Full list
- Members: Damon Albarn; Graham Coxon; Alex James; Dave Rowntree
- Website: blur.co.uk

Blur are an English rock band formed in London in 1988, consisting of singer Damon Albarn, guitarist Graham Coxon, bassist Alex James, and drummer Dave Rowntree. Their debut album, Leisure (1991), incorporated the sounds of Madchester and shoegaze. Following a stylistic change influenced by British guitar pop groups such as the Kinks, the Beatles, and XTC, Blur released the albums Modern Life Is Rubbish (1993), Parklife (1994), and The Great Escape (1995). The Parklife lead single "Girls & Boys" became a hit in the UK and the US, respectively peaking at number 5 on the UK singles chart and number 59 on the Billboard Hot 100. As a result, the band helped to popularise the Britpop genre and achieved mass popularity in the UK, aided by a widely publicised chart battle with rival band Oasis in 1995 dubbed "the Battle of Britpop".

Blur's self-titled fifth album (1997) saw another stylistic shift, influenced by the lo-fi styles of American indie rock groups, and became their third UK chart-topping album. Its single "Song 2" became popular on alternative radio in the US. Their next album, 13 (1999), saw the band experimenting with electronic and art rock styles, and featured more personal lyrics from Albarn and Coxon. Their seventh album, Think Tank (2003), continued their experimentation with electronic sounds and was shaped by Albarn's growing interest in world music, featuring more minimal guitar work. Coxon left the band early in the sessions for Think Tank, and Blur disbanded for several years after the album's tour in 2003.

In 2009, Blur reunited with Coxon and embarked on a European reunion tour. In the following years, they released several singles and compilations and toured internationally. In 2012, they received the Brit Award for Outstanding Contribution to Music. Their eighth album, The Magic Whip (2015), was their first in twelve years and the sixth consecutive Blur studio album to top the British charts. After the Magic Whip tour, Blur went on hiatus until the release of their ninth album, The Ballad of Darren, in 2023.

== History ==
=== Formation and Leisure (1988–1991) ===
After their original name, Seymour, was rejected by Food Records, the band chose Blur from a list of alternatives the label drew up.

Blur were formed in December 1988 when bassist Alex James joined Damon Albarn's band, Circus, and they changed the name to Seymour after J. D. Salinger's Seymour: An Introduction. Already in the band were drummer Dave Rowntree, who had joined in October, and guitarist Graham Coxon, Albarn's childhood friend from Essex, who was studying at the University of London's Goldsmiths College along with Albarn and James. The group performed live for the first time in summer 1989 in the goods shed of the East Anglian Railway Museum at Chappel & Wakes Colne. In November, Food Records' A&R representative Andy Ross attended a Seymour performance that convinced him to court the group for his label. After this he brought label founder David Balfe to a couple more, including a particularly packed gig at The Falcon, Camden. The only concern held by Ross and Food was that they disliked the band's name. Food drew up a list of alternatives, from which the group decided on Blur. Food Records finally signed the rechristened band in March 1990.

From March to July 1990, Blur toured Britain, opening for the Cramps, and testing out new songs. In October 1990, after their tour was over, Blur released the single "She's So High", which reached number 48 in the UK singles chart. The band had trouble creating a follow-up single, but they made progress when paired with producer Stephen Street. The resulting single release, "There's No Other Way", became a hit, peaking at number eight. As a result of the single's success, Blur became pop stars and were accepted into a clique of bands who frequented the Syndrome club in London dubbed "The Scene That Celebrates Itself". NME magazine wrote in 1991, "[Blur] are [the] acceptable pretty face of a whole clump of bands that have emerged since the whole Manchester thing started to run out of steam."

The band's third single, "Bang", performed relatively disappointingly, reaching only number 24. Andy Ross and Food owner David Balfe were convinced Blur's best course of action was to continue drawing influence from the Madchester genre. Blur attempted to expand their musical sound, but the recording of the group's debut album was hindered by Albarn having to write his lyrics in the studio. Although the resulting album Leisure (1991) peaked at number seven on the UK Albums Chart, it received mixed reviews, and according to journalist John Harris, "could not shake off the odour of anti-climax".

=== Britpop years (1992–1995) ===
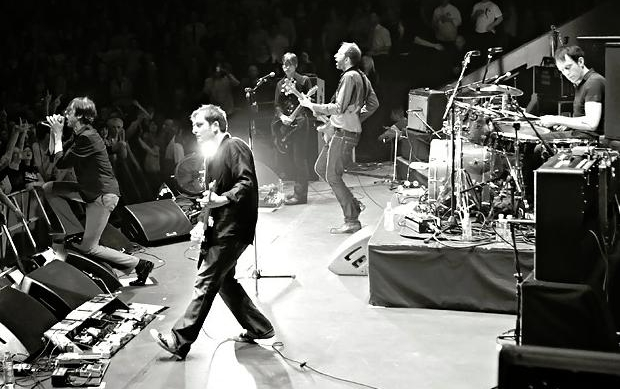
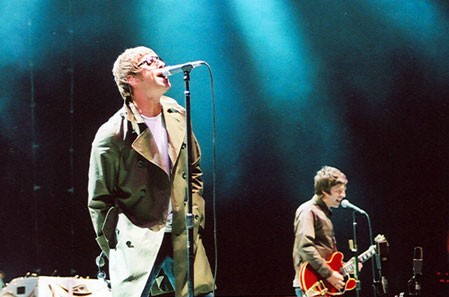
Blur's Britpop rivals of the 1990s, Suede (top) and Oasis (bottom)

After discovering they were £60,000 in debt, Blur toured the United States in 1992 in an attempt to recoup their financial losses. The group released the single "Popscene" to coincide with the start of the tour. Featuring "a rush of punk guitars, '60s pop hooks, blaring British horns, controlled fury, and postmodern humor", "Popscene" was a turning point for the band musically. However, upon its release it only charted at number 32. "We felt 'Popscene' was a big departure; a very, very English record", Albarn told the NME in 1993, "But that annoyed a lot of people ... We put ourselves out on a limb to pursue this English ideal and no-one was interested." As a result of the single's lacklustre performance, plans to release a single named "Never Clever" were scrapped and work on Blur's second album was pushed back.

During the two-month American tour, the band became increasingly unhappy, often venting frustrations on each other, leading to several physical confrontations. The band members were homesick; Albarn said, "I just started to miss really simple things ... I missed everything about England so I started writing songs which created an English atmosphere." Upon the group's return to Britain, Blur (Albarn in particular) were upset by the success rival group Suede had achieved while they were gone. After a poor performance at a 1992 gig that featured a well-received set by Suede on the same bill, Blur were in danger of being dropped by Food. By that time, Blur had undergone an ideological and image shift intended to celebrate their British heritage in contrast to the popularity of American grunge bands such as Nirvana. Although sceptical of Albarn's new manifesto for Blur, Balfe gave assent for the band's choice of Andy Partridge (of XTC) to produce their follow-up to Leisure. The sessions with Partridge proved unsatisfactory, but a chance reunion with Stephen Street resulted in him returning to produce the group.

Blur completed their second album Modern Life Is Rubbish in December 1992, but Food Records said the album required more potential hit singles and asked them to return to the studio for a second time. The band complied and Albarn wrote "For Tomorrow", which became the album's lead single. "For Tomorrow" was a minor success, reaching number 28 on the charts. Modern Life Is Rubbish was released in May 1993. The announcement of the album's release included a press photo which featured Blur, dressed in a mix of mod and skinhead attire, posing alongside a mastiff with the words "British Image 1" spraypainted behind them. At the time, such imagery was viewed as nationalistic and racially insensitive by the British music press; to quieten concerns, Blur released the "British Image 2" photo, which was "a camp restaging of a pre-war aristocratic tea party". Modern Life Is Rubbish peaked at number 15 on the British charts, but failed to break into the US Billboard 200, selling only 19,000 copies there.

The success of Parklife (1994) revived Blur's commercial fortunes. The album's first single, the disco-influenced "Girls & Boys", found favour on BBC Radio 1 and peaked at number 5 on the UK Singles Chart, and number 59 in the US Billboard Hot 100 where it remains the band's highest-charting single. Parklife entered the British charts at number one and stayed on the album charts for 90 weeks. Enthusiastically greeted by the music press—the NME called it "a Great Pop Record ... bigger, bolder, narkier and funnier [than Modern Life is Rubbish]"—Parklife is regarded as one of Britpop's defining records. Blur won four awards at the 1995 Brit Awards, including Best Band and Best Album for Parklife. Coxon later pointed to Parklife as the moment when "[Blur] went from being regarded as an alternative, left field arty band to this amazing new pop sensation".

Blur began working on their fourth album The Great Escape at the start of 1995. Building upon the band's previous two albums, Albarn's lyrics for the album consisted of several third-person narratives. James reflected, "It was all more elaborate, more orchestral, more theatrical, and the lyrics were even more twisted ... It was all dysfunctional, misfit characters fucking up." The release of the album's lead single "Country House" played a part in Blur's public rivalry with Manchester band Oasis termed the "Battle of Britpop". Partly due to increasing antagonisms between the groups, Blur and Oasis released their new singles on the same day, an event the NME called "The British Heavyweight Championship". The debate over which band would top the British singles chart became a media phenomenon, and Albarn appeared on the News at Ten. At the end of the week, "Country House" ultimately outsold Oasis' "Roll With It" by 274,000 copies to 216,000, becoming Blur's first number one single.

The Great Escape, which Albarn told the public was the last installment in the band's Life Trilogy, was released in September 1995 to ecstatic reviews. The NME hailed it as "spectacularly accomplished, sumptuous, heart-stopping and inspirational", while Mojo argued "Blur are the very best that '95 Britpop has to offer and this is a most gong-worthy sound, complete with head-slicing guitars, catchy tunes and very funny words". Entering the UK charts at number one, the album sold nearly half a million copies in its first month of sale. However, opinion quickly changed and Blur found themselves largely out of favour with the media once again. Following the worldwide success of Oasis' (What's the Story) Morning Glory? (which went quadruple platinum in the United States), the media quipped "[Blur] wound up winning the battle but losing the war." Blur became perceived as an "inauthentic middle class pop band" in comparison to the "working class heroes" Oasis, which Albarn said made him feel "stupid and confused". Alex James later summarised, "After being the People's Hero, Damon was the People's Prick for a short period ... basically, he was a loser – very publicly."

=== Reinvention after Britpop (1996–2000) ===
An early 1996 Q magazine interview revealed that relations between Blur members had become very strained; journalist Adrian Deevoy wrote that he found them "on the verge of a nervous breakup". Coxon, in particular, began to resent his bandmates: James for his playboy lifestyle, and Albarn for his control over Blur's musical direction and public image. The guitarist struggled with drinking problems and, in a rejection of the group's Britpop aesthetic, made a point of listening to noisy American alternative rock bands such as Pavement. In February 1996, when Coxon and James were absent for a lip-synced Blur performance broadcast on Italian television, they were replaced by a cardboard cutout and a roadie, respectively. Blur biographer Stuart Maconie later wrote that, at the time, "Blur were sewn together very awkwardly".

Although he had previously dismissed it, Albarn grew to appreciate Coxon's tastes in lo-fi and underground music, and recognised the need to significantly change Blur's musical direction once again. "I can sit at my piano and write brilliant observational pop songs all day long but you've got to move on", he said. He subsequently approached Street, and argued for a more stripped-down sound on the band's next record. Coxon, recognising his own personal need to—as Rowntree put it—"work this band", wrote a letter to Albarn, describing his desire for their music "to scare people again". After initial sessions in London, the band left to record the rest of the album in Iceland, away from the Britpop scene.

The result was Blur, the band's fifth studio album, released in February 1997. Although the music press predicted that the lo-fi sonic experimentation would alienate Blur's teenage girl fan-base, they generally applauded the effort. Pointing out lyrics such as "Look inside America/She's alright", and noting Albarn's "obligatory nod to Beck, [and promotion of] the new Pavement album as if paid to do so", reviewers felt the band had come to accept American values during this time—an about-face of their attitude during the Britpop years. Despite cries of "commercial suicide", the album and its first single, "Beetlebum", debuted at number one in the UK. Although the album could not match the sales of its predecessors in Britain, internationally Blur was more successful. In the US, the album received strong reviews, reached number 61 on the Billboard 200 and was certified gold. The album's second single and second track, aptly named "Song 2", was also popular on alternative radio, reaching number six on the Billboard Modern Rock chart and remaining on that chart for 26 weeks. After it was licensed for use in various media—such as soundtracks, advertisements, video games (such as FIFA: Road to World Cup 98), and television shows—"Song 2" became the most recognisable Blur song in the US. After the success of Blur, the band embarked on a nine-month world tour.

In February 1998, a few months after completing the tour, Blur released Bustin' + Dronin' for the Japanese market. The album is a collection of Blur songs remixed by artists such as Thurston Moore, William Orbit and Moby. Among the tracks, the band were most impressed by Orbit's effort and enlisted him to replace Street as producer for their next album, citing a need to approach the recording process from a fresh perspective.

Released in March 1999, Blur's sixth studio album 13 saw them drift still further away from their Britpop-era attitude and sound. Orbit's production style allowed for more jamming, and incorporated a "variety of emotions, atmospheres, words and sounds" into the mix. 13 was creatively dominated by Coxon, who "was simply allowed to do whatever he chose, unedited", by Orbit. Albarn's lyrics—more heart-felt, personal and intimate than on previous occasions—were reflective of his break-up with Elastica frontwoman Justine Frischmann, his partner of eight years. The album received generally favourable reviews from the press. While Q called it "a dense, fascinating, idiosyncratic and accomplished art rock album", the NME felt it was inconsistent and "(at least) a quarter-of-an-hour too long". 13 debuted at the top of the UK charts, staying at that position for two weeks. The album's lead single, the gospel-based "Tender", opened at the second spot on the charts. After "Coffee & TV", the first Blur single to feature Coxon on lead vocals, only reached number 11 in the UK, manager Chris Morrison demanded a chart re-run because of what he deemed was a sales miscalculation.

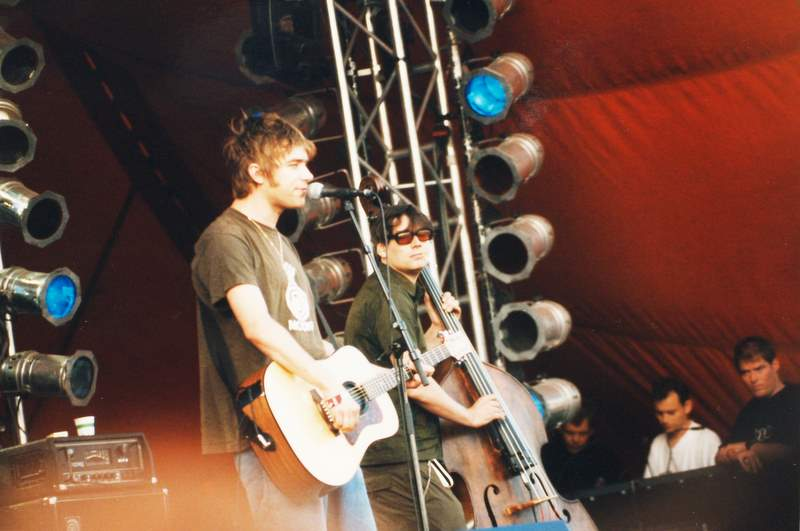
Blur at the Roskilde Festival, 1999

In July 1999, in celebration of their tenth anniversary, Blur released a 22-CD limited edition box-set of their singles. The accompanying tour saw Blur play the A-sides of the 22 singles in their chronological order of release. In October 2000, the group released the compilation Blur: The Best Of, which debuted at number three in the UK and went 4× Platinum due to 1,200,000 copies being shipped. Dismissed by the band as "the first record we have seen as product", the track listing and release dates of Blur: The Best Of were determined on the basis of market research and focus groups conducted by Blur's record label, EMI. By this time, the group had largely disowned the upbeat pop singles from the Britpop era, and favoured the more arty, experimental work on Blur and 13. In an otherwise highly enthusiastic review of the best-of for the NME, Steve Sutherland criticised the band's "sheer disregard" for their earlier work; "Just because these songs embarrassed them once they started listening to broadsheet critics and retreated wounded from the big-sales battle with Oasis doesn't mean that we're morons to love them."

=== Coxon's departure, Think Tank and hiatus (2001–2007) ===
After 13 and the subsequent tours in 1999–2000, band members pursued other projects. Graham Coxon recorded a string of solo albums, while Damon Albarn dedicated his time to Gorillaz, the animated band he had created with Jamie Hewlett. Alex James worked with Fat Les and co-wrote several songs with Sophie Ellis-Bextor and Marianne Faithfull.

Recording for Blur's next album began in London in November 2001, but concerted work started in June 2002, with the sessions moving to Marrakesh, Morocco soon after, and then to Devon back in the UK. Not long after the sessions began, Coxon left the group. Graham had developed a drinking problem as Blur received more mainstream success. Being more involved in the business side of music than he would have liked caused Coxon to develop anxiety and depression. This caused friendships and relationship problems. Coxon said "there were no rows" and "[the band] just recognized the feeling that we needed some time apart". Before the album was released, Blur released a new single, "Don't Bomb When You Are the Bomb" as a very limited white label release. The song is largely electronic, and was part of the band's protest against war in the Middle East. Albarn, however, attempted to assuage fans' fears that the album would be electronic by providing reassurances that the band's new album would be "a rockin' record", and also said that it has "a lot of finely crafted pop songs". Early in 2002, Blur recorded a song that would be played by European Space Agency's Beagle 2 lander once it touched down; however, attempts to locate the probe after it landed on Mars were fruitless.

Think Tank, released in May 2003, was filled with atmospheric, brooding electronic sounds, featuring simpler guitar lines played by Albarn, and largely relying on other instruments to replace Coxon. The guitarist's absence also meant that Think Tank was almost entirely written by Albarn. Its sound was seen as a testament to Albarn's increasing interest in African and Middle Eastern music, and to his complete control over the group's creative direction. Think Tank was yet another UK number one and reached number 56 in the United States. It was also nominated for best album at the 2004 Brit Awards. The band did a successful tour in 2003, with former Verve guitarist Simon Tong filling in for Coxon.

In 2005, XFM News reported that Blur would record an EP, and denied that they would hire a replacement guitarist for Coxon. There were also some aborted recordings made in 2005. Overall, the band kept a low profile and did no studio or touring work as a three-piece. Coxon significantly thawed on the subject of rejoining Blur and in 2007 band members announced that they would reunite and that they intended to record together in August, with the date later being pushed back to September, then October. Though the band members finally met up in October, they posted on their website that they had only "met up for an enjoyable lunch" and that there were no "other music plans for Blur".

=== Reunion performances (2008–2015) ===
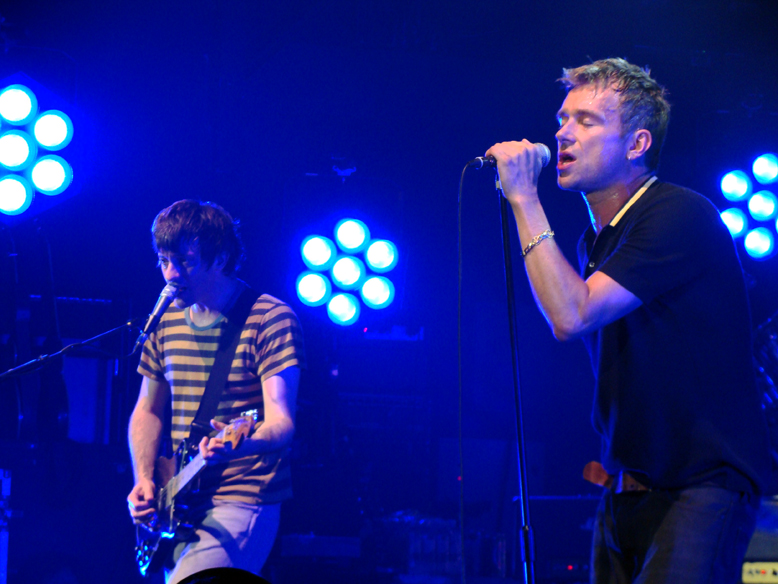
Coxon (left) and Albarn (right) on stage at the Newcastle Academy in June 2009

In December 2008, Blur announced they would reunite for a concert at London's Hyde Park on 3 July 2009. Days later, the band added a second date, for 2 July. A series of June preview shows were also announced, ending at Manchester Evening News arena on the 26th. All the shows were well received; The Guardian's music critic Alexis Petridis gave their performance at Goldsmiths college a full five stars, and wrote "Blur's music seems to have potentiated by the passing of years ... they sound both more frenetic and punky and more nuanced and exploratory than they did at the height of their fame". Blur headlined the Glastonbury Festival on 28 June, where they played for the first time since their headline slot in 1998. Reviews of the Glastonbury performance were enthusiastic; The Guardian called them "the best Glastonbury headliners in an age". The band released their second greatest hits album Midlife: A Beginner's Guide to Blur on 15 June 2009.

Blur also headlined at other summer festivals, including Oxegen 2009 in Ireland, and the Scottish outdoor show of T in the Park. Their T in the Park headline slot was put in jeopardy after Graham Coxon was admitted to hospital with food poisoning. Ultimately, the band did play, albeit an hour and a half after they were scheduled to appear. After the completion of the reunion dates, James said the group had not discussed further plans, and Albarn told Q soon after that Blur had no intention of recording or touring again. He said, "I just can't do it anymore", and explained that the main motivation for participating in the reunion was to repair his relationship with Coxon, which he succeeded at. Coxon also said that no further Blur activity was planned, telling NME.com in September, "We're in touch and we say 'Wotcha' and all that but nothing has been mentioned about any more shows or anything else".

In January 2010, No Distance Left to Run, a documentary about the band, was released in cinemas and a month later on DVD. The same month, their 1994 album Parklife was one of ten classic album covers from British artists commemorated on a UK postage stamp issued by the Royal Mail; the collection was unveiled by Led Zeppelin guitarist Jimmy Page. In April 2010, Blur released their first new recording since 2003, "Fool's Day", for the Record Store Day event, as a vinyl record limited to 1000 copies; it was later made available as a free download on their website. No Distance Left to Run was nominated as Best Long Form Music Video for the 53rd Grammy Awards, Blur's first-ever Grammy nomination.

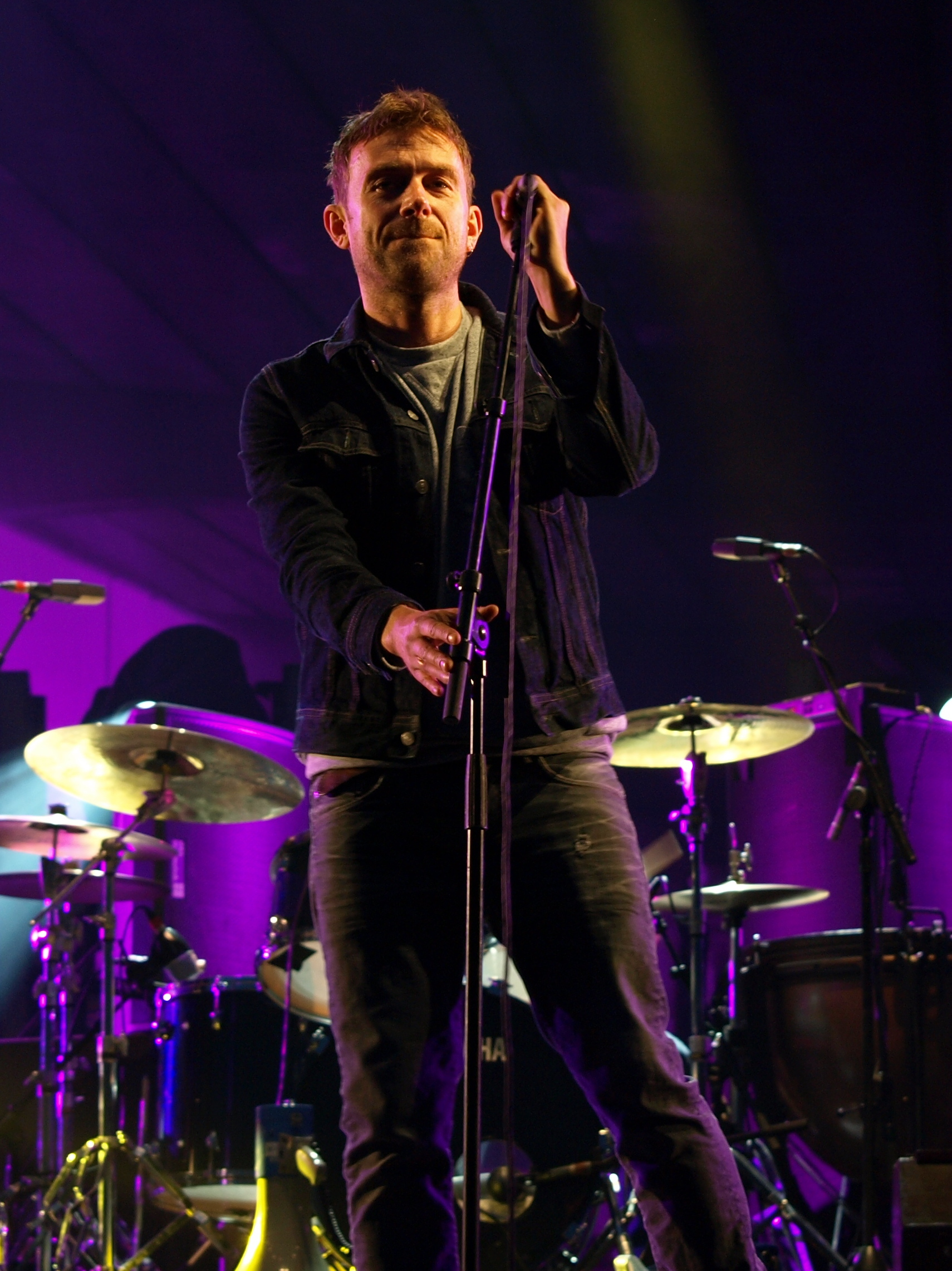
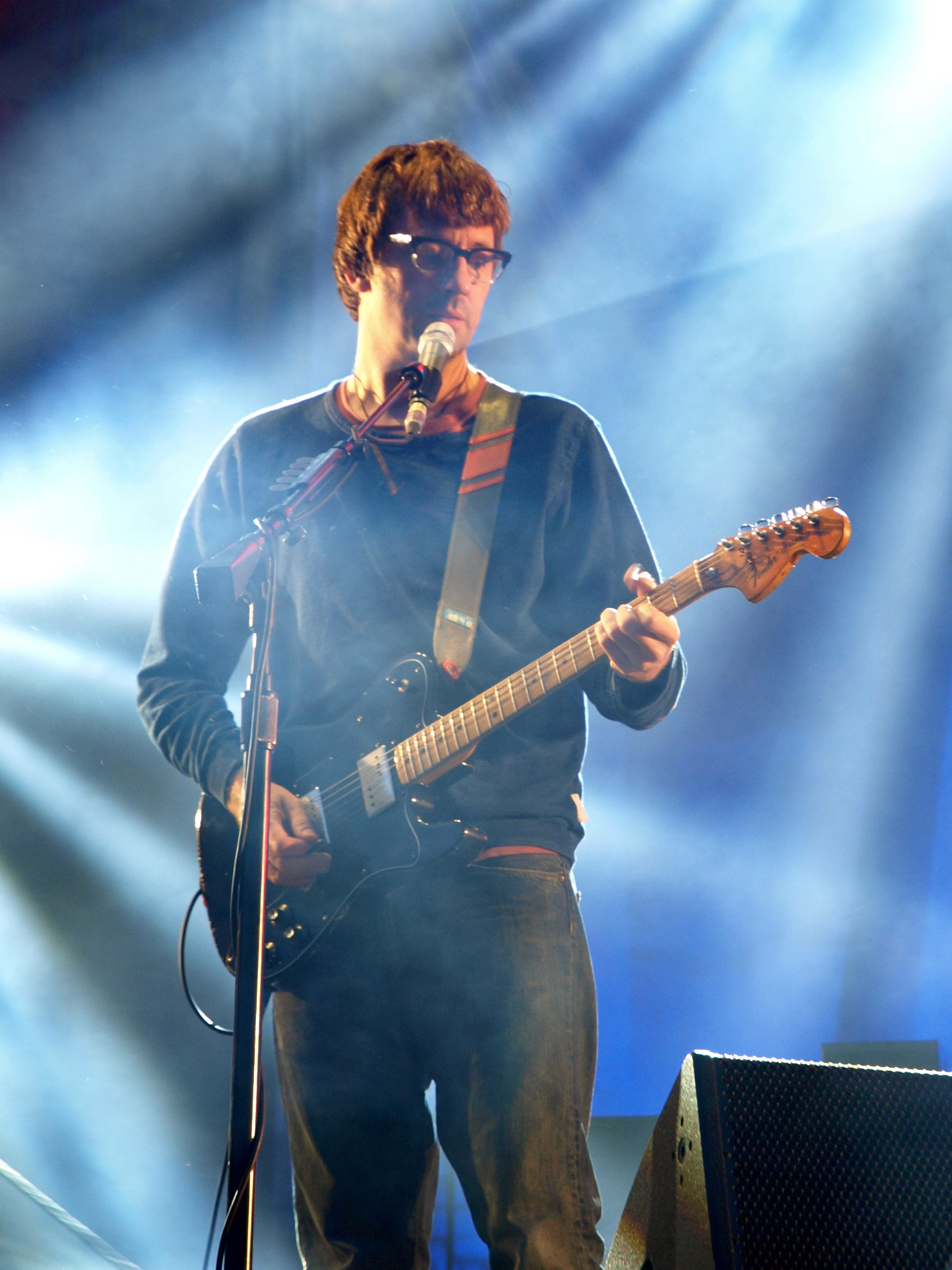
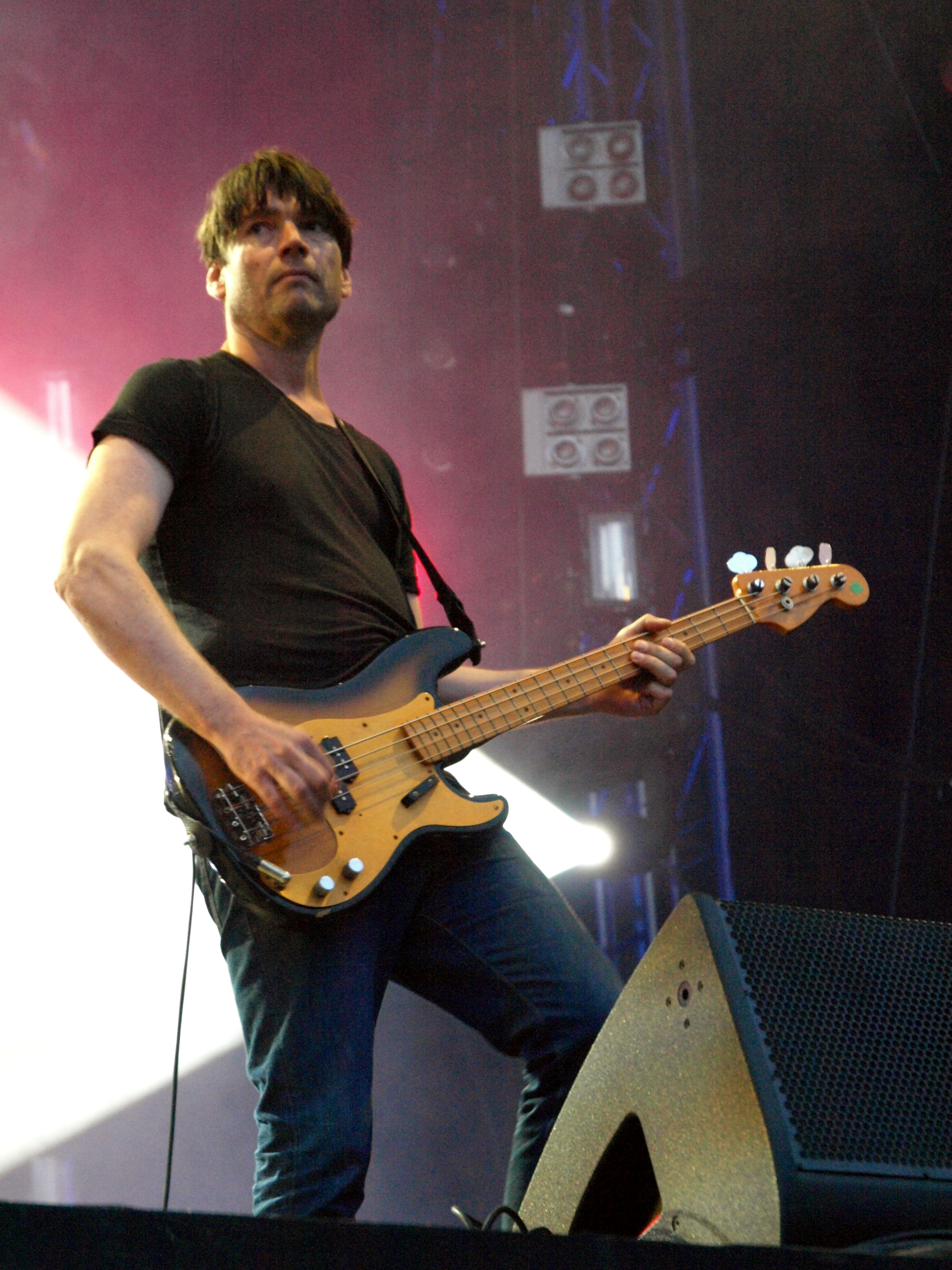
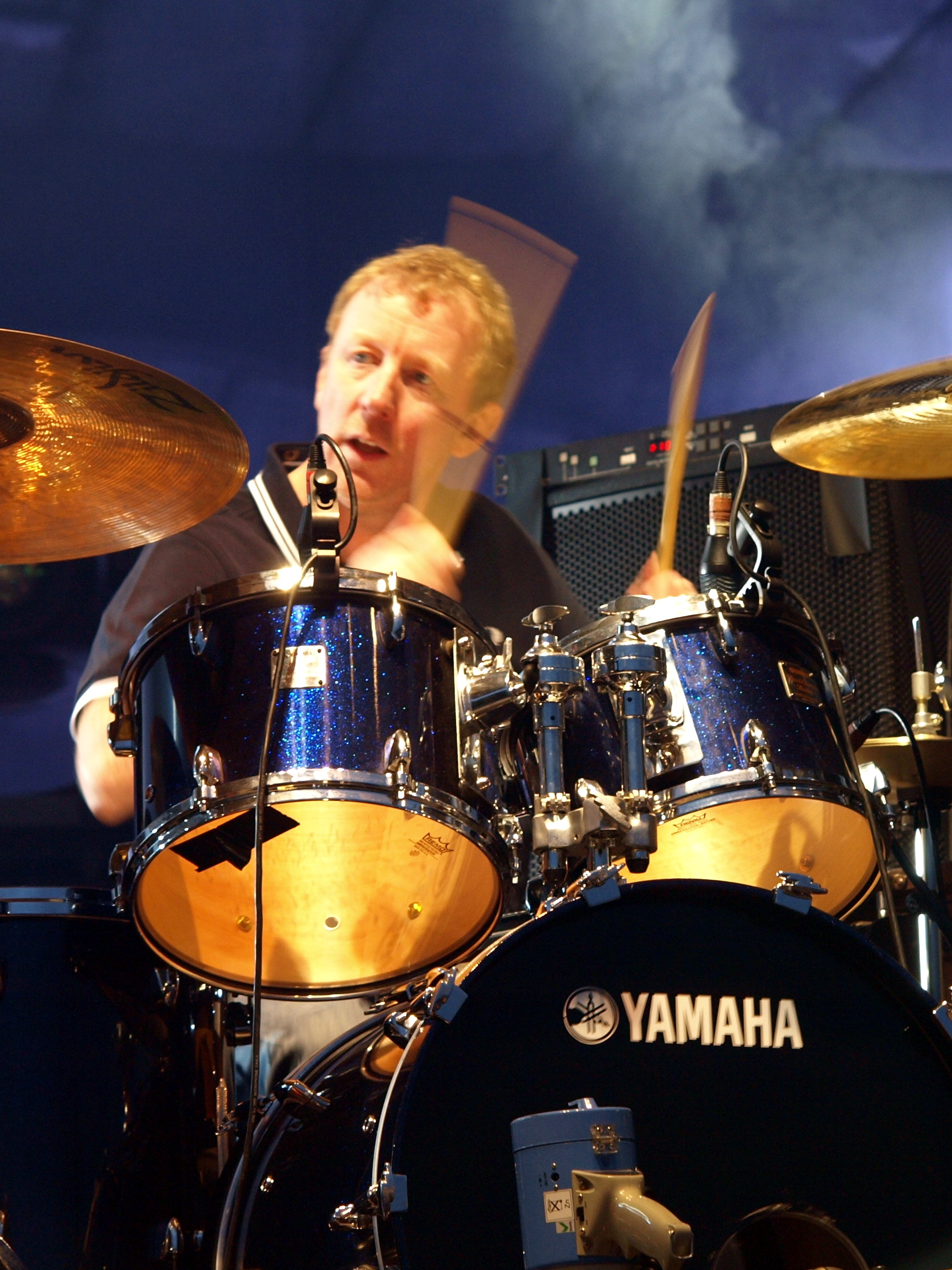
Blur perform at Provinssirock 2013 in Finland

In February 2012, Blur were awarded the Outstanding Contribution to Music award at the 2012 Brit Awards. Later that month, Albarn and Coxon premiered a new track together live, "Under the Westway". In April, the band announced that a box-set entitled Blur 21—containing all seven Blur studio albums, four discs of unreleased rarities and three DVDs—would be released in July. Blur had also entered the studio early that year to record material for a new album, but in May producer William Orbit told the NME that Albarn had halted recording. Blur's official Twitter and Facebook pages announced that the band would release two singles "The Puritan" and "Under the Westway" on 2 July. That August, Blur headlined a show at Hyde Park for the 2012 Summer Olympics closing ceremony. In 2013, the band performed at the Rock Werchter in Belgium, the Spanish and Portuguese dates of the Primavera Sound festival, and the Coachella Valley Music and Arts Festival in the United States.

=== The Magic Whip and second hiatus (2015–2022) ===
In April 2015, Blur released their first studio album in twelve years, The Magic Whip. Conceived over five days in Hong Kong after a cancelled Japan tour in 2013, the album was inspired by the city as well. "There's nothing pastoral about it", Albarn said, "it's very urban". The Magic Whip also marks the return of Coxon, absent on all but one track on Think Tank, and Stephen Street, Blur's producer during the Britpop era.

The Magic Whip received positive reviews. Awarding the album a full five stars, The Daily Telegraph called The Magic Whip "a triumphant comeback that retains the band's core identity while allowing ideas they'd fermented separately over the past decade to infuse their sound with mature and peculiar new flavour combinations". The NME concurred, saying Blur were "a reunited band making music to rival their very best". It was also a commercial success, becoming the sixth consecutive Blur LP since Parklife (1994) to top the British charts. The Guardian also noted that at times during its first week of release, The Magic Whip sold "more than the rest of the top five combined". The Magic Whip also became Blur's highest charting album in the United States when it peaked at number 24 on the Billboard 200. That December New World Towers, a documentary on the recording process of The Magic Whip, was released in select British theatres.

Blur went on hiatus following the 2015 Magic Whip tour. They briefly reunited in March 2019 for a surprise performance at an Albarn-organized Africa Express event in London.

=== The Ballad of Darren, and second reunion (2022–present) ===
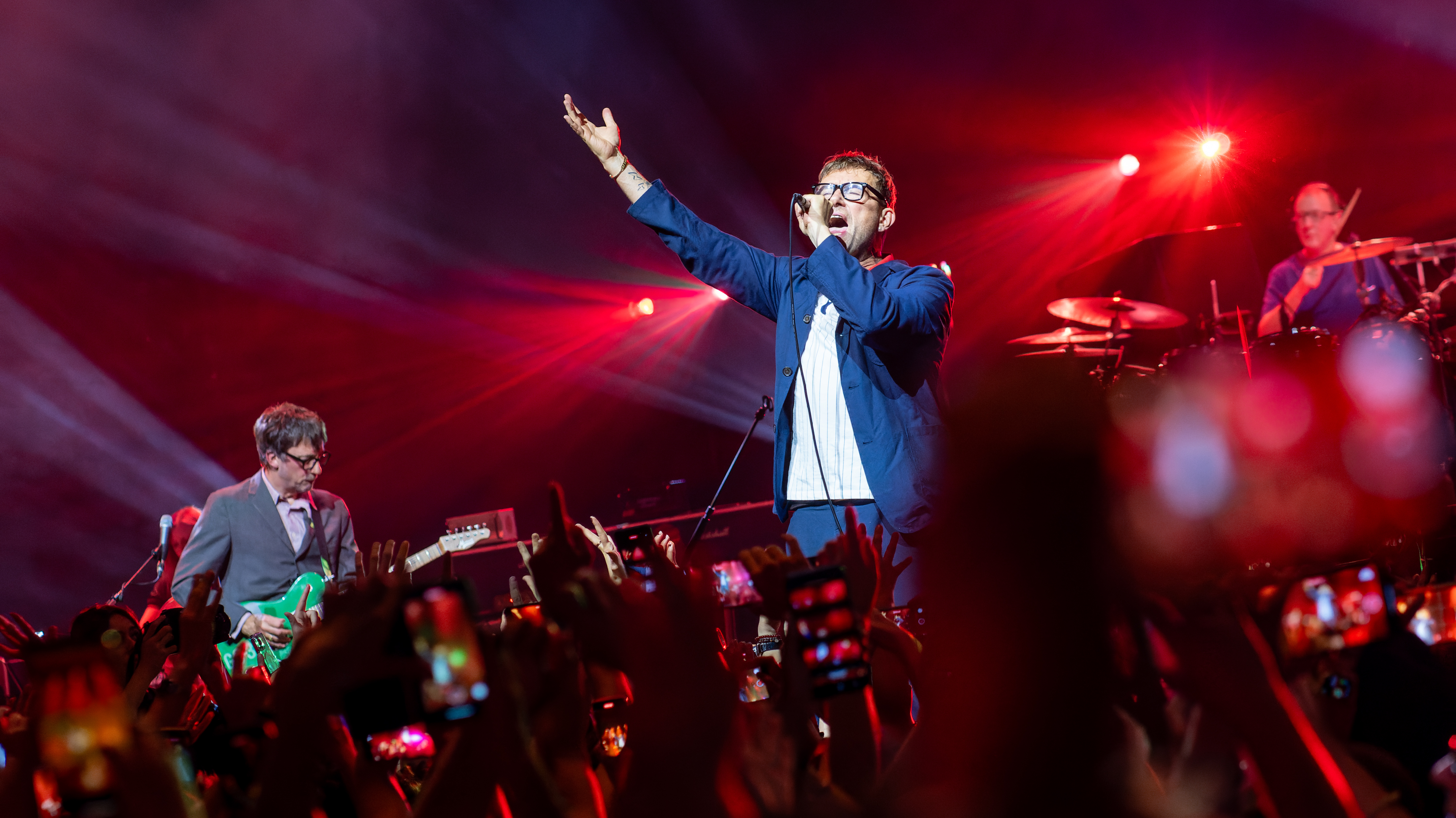
Blur, "The Ballad Of Darren" Album Playback Show at Eventim Apollo, Hammersmith, Tuesday 25 July 2023

On 14 November 2022, Blur announced that they would perform at Wembley Stadium on 8 July 2023 – their first headline performance since 2015. On 10 February 2023, in line with the reunion, the band collaborated with clothing brand PLEASURES to release a line of items commemorating their 1997 album Blur.

On 18 May 2023, Blur released "The Narcissist", the first single from their ninth studio album The Ballad of Darren. The next day, the band played their first concert in eight years on 19 May 2023 at the Colchester Arts Centre in Colchester. Following the warmup shows, Blur performed at Primavera Sound in Barcelona and Malahide Castle near Dublin. Blur headlined Wembley Stadium on 8 July and 9 July 2023, with Jockstrap, Sleaford Mods, and Self Esteem as the support acts for the first show, and The Selecter and Paul Weller as support acts for the second show. The Ballad of Darren was released on 21 July, and was preceded by the second single "St. Charles Square". After the album's release, the band performed at the Lokerse Feesten in Belgium on 8 August, Øyafestivalen in Oslo on 10 August, Way Out West in Gothenburg on 11 August, Flow Festival in Helsinki on 13 August and Summer Sonic Festival in Tokyo and Osaka on 19 and 20 August.

On 5 December, Albarn announced that Blur would enter another hiatus, saying, "[It's] time to wrap up this campaign. It's too much for me." However, the band accepted a late night phone call offer to play 2024's Coachella, with management giving them five minutes to decide, prompting Albarn to postpone the hiatus. Blur performed a warm-up sold out show at Pomona Fox Theater supported by Jockstrap on 10 April, the group's first U.S. show since 2015. The band's first week Coachella performance on 13 April drew significant media attention for the lack of crowd interaction during "Girls & Boys" and Albarn's visible frustration. During the band's second week Coachella performance on 20 April, Albarn said it was probably the band's final show. In early May 2024, it was announced that July 2024 would see the release of a new documentary titled To the End.

== Musical style and influences ==
Blur's musical style has been described as Britpop, alternative rock, indie rock, art pop, pop rock, art rock, and pop, with influences from indie rock and lo-fi. AllMusic stated that the band "codified the inchoate sounds of British indie" during the early 1990s. The band's seventh studio album Think Tank moved into more of an electronic sound. The band's influences include David Bowie, Bobby Womack, William Onyeabor, the B-52's, the Kinks, Pink Floyd, the Jam, and Depeche Mode. In their days as Seymour, they were a "shambolic" avant-pop band, whose early concerts exhibited their art school background; meanwhile, Albarn "took cues" from Syd Barrett and Julian Cope.

== Band members ==
- Damon Albarn – lead vocals, keyboards, guitar (1988–2003, 2009–2015, 2023–present)
- Graham Coxon – guitar, backing and lead vocals, saxophone (1988–2002, 2009–2015, 2023–present)
- Alex James – bass, backing vocals (1988–2003, 2009–2015, 2023–present)
- Dave Rowntree – drums, percussion, backing vocals (1988–2003, 2009–2015, 2023–present)

Former touring musicians

- Kick Horns – horn section (1992–1995)
- Cara Tivey – keyboards (1993–1995)
- Mike Smith – keyboards, saxophone (1994–1998, 1999, 2003, 2009–2015, 2023–2024)
- Richard Sidwell – trumpet (1995–1999)
- Diana Gutkind – keyboards, backing vocals (1995–2000)
- Simon Tong – guitar (2003)
- Beverley Brown – backing vocals (2003)
- Cornelius Macarthy – backing vocals (2003)
- Karl Vanden Bossche – percussion (2003, 2015)
- Wayne Hernandez – backing vocals (2003, 2009–2015)
- Wendi Rose – backing vocals (2003, 2009–2015)
- Sam Freeman – backing vocals (2009)
- Janet "Cookie" Ramus – backing vocals (2009, 2012–2013)
- Alistair White – trombone, euphonium (2009, 2012–2014)
- Dan Carpenter – trumpet (2009, 2012–2014)
- Dave Williamson – trombone (2009, 2012–2014)
- Tyrone Henry – backing vocals (2012)
- Barnaby Dixon – trombone (2012–2013)
- Travis Cole – backing vocals (2013–2015)
- Rory Simmons – trumpet (2015)
- Simon Finch – trumpet (2015)
- Eoghan Kelly – trombone (2015)
- Tom Richards – saxophone (2015)

== Discography ==
Studio albums

- Leisure (1991)
- Modern Life Is Rubbish (1993)
- Parklife (1994)
- The Great Escape (1995)
- Blur (1997)
- 13 (1999)
- Think Tank (2003)
- The Magic Whip (2015)
- The Ballad of Darren (2023)

== See also ==
- Cool Britannia
- List of awards and nominations received by Blur
