= Nadine Shah discography =

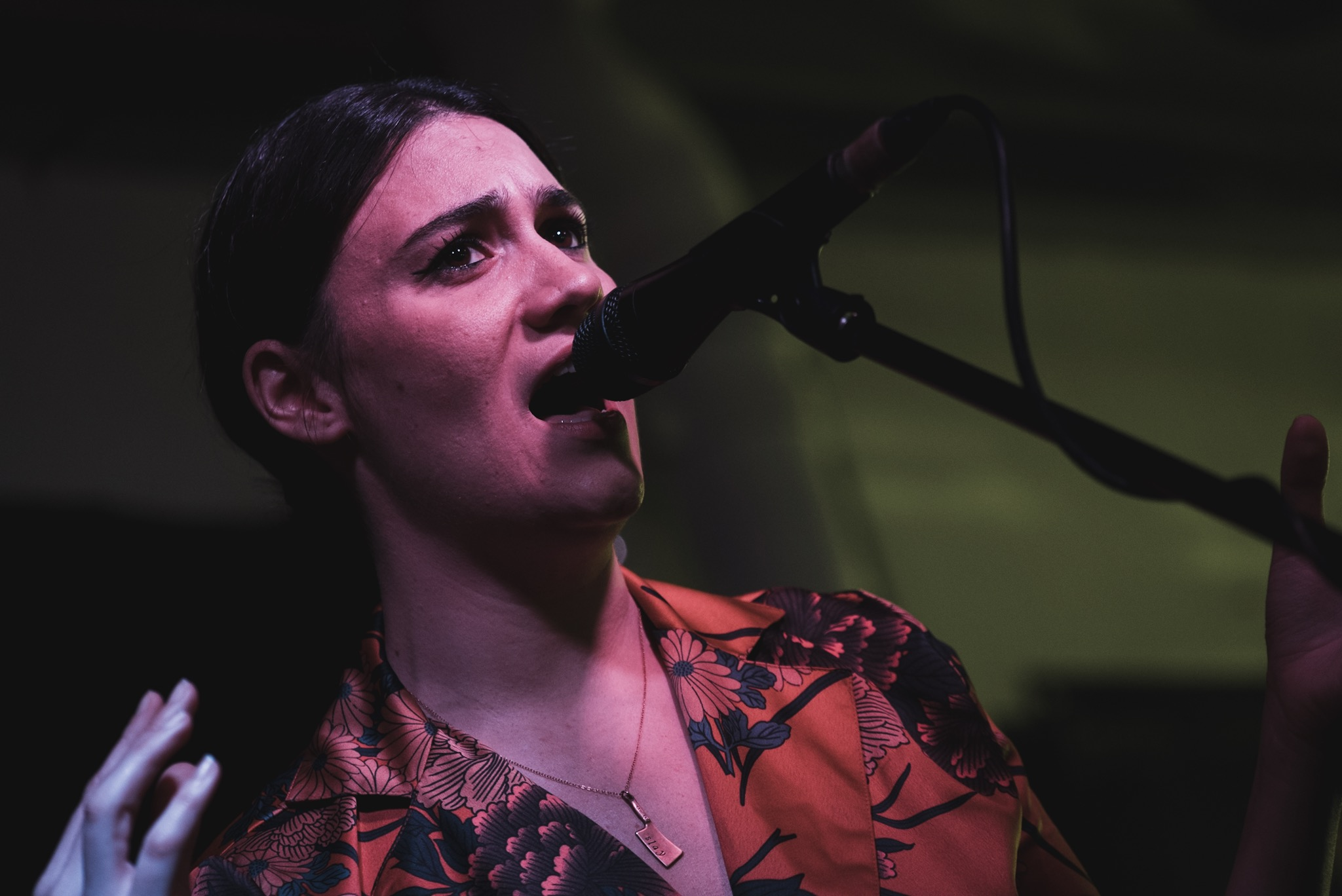
- Shah performing at Rough Trade, 2017
- Studio albums: 5
- EPs: 2
- Live albums: 1
- Singles: 18
- Music videos: 14
- Remixes: 1
- Collaborations: 1

The discography of English singer-songwriter Nadine Shah consists of five studio albums, one live album, two extended plays, eighteen singles, one remix, one collaboration, nine featured contributions, one compilation-exclusive contribution, and fourteen music videos. Shah makes all of her music with collaborator Ben Hillier, and she has occasionally featured for other artists such as Ghostpoet and Self Esteem.

Shah debuted in 2012 with the Aching Bones EP on Label Fandango. The successive Dreary Town EP and first two studio albums were all released through the Belgian label Apollo Records; the second album in particular, Fast Food (2015), marked her first entry in the UK Albums Chart, reaching no. 48. Since then, she has issued music through numerous other record labels, including 1965 Records, Infectious Music, and EMI North, with whom she released her fifth studio album, Filthy Underneath (2024). It is her highest-charting album in the UK and Scotland to date, reaching no. 25 and no. 4, respectively. The following year, she released her first live album, Live in London, also on EMI North.

== Albums ==
=== Studio albums ===
List of studio albums, with relevant details
Title	Details	Peak chart positions			Ref.
Title	Details	UK	UK Indie	SCO	Ref.
Love Your Dum and Mad	Released: 22 July 2013; Label: Apollo	—	23	—	
Fast Food	Released: 6 April 2015; Label: Apollo	48	8	85	
Holiday Destination	Released: 25 August 2017; Label: 1965	71	5	57	
Kitchen Sink	Released: 5 June 2020; Label: Infectious	29	3	14	
Filthy Underneath	Released: 23 February 2024; Label: EMI North	25	—	4	
"—" denotes a recording that did not chart.

=== Live albums ===
List of live albums, with relevant details
Title	Details	Ref.
Live in London	Released: 16 May 2025; Label: EMI North	

== Extended plays ==
List of extended plays, with relevant details
Title	Details	Ref.
Aching Bones	Released: 19 November 2012; Label: Label Fandango	
Dreary Town	Released: 15 April 2013; Label: Apollo	

== Singles ==
List of singles, with relevant details
Year	Title	Peak chart positions	Album/EP	Ref.
Year	Title	UK Phys.	Album/EP	Ref.
2012	"Are You with Me"	—	Aching Bones EP	
2013	"Dreary Town"	—	Dreary Town EP / Love Your Dum and Mad	
2013	"To Be a Young Man"	51	Love Your Dum and Mad	
2013	"Runaway"	—	Love Your Dum and Mad	
2013	"Aching Bones" (Single Edit)	—	Aching Bones EP / Love Your Dum and Mad	
2014	"Ville Morose / The Devil"	—	Non-album single / Love Your Dum and Mad	
2014	"Stealing Cars"	—	Fast Food	
2015	"Fool"	19	Fast Food	
2017	"Out the Way"	—	Holiday Destination	
2017	"Yes Men"	—	Holiday Destination	
2017	"Holiday Destination"	—	Holiday Destination	
2017	"Evil"	—	Holiday Destination	
2020	"Ladies for Babies (Goats for Love)"	—	Kitchen Sink	
2020	"Trad"	—	Kitchen Sink	
2020	"Buckfast"	—	Kitchen Sink	
2023	"Topless Mother"	—	Filthy Underneath	
2023	"Twenty Things"	—	Filthy Underneath	
2024	"Greatest Dancer"	—	Filthy Underneath	

== Remixes ==
List of remixes, with relevant details
Year	Title	Ref.
2013	"Dreary Town" (Cloud Boat remix)	

== Collaborations ==
List of collaborations, with relevant details
Year	Song	Album	Artist	Role	Ref.
2024	"Cuckoo"	Duets	Ben Nicholls	Vocals, arrangement	

== Contributions ==
=== As featured artist ===
List of featured contributions, with relevant details
Year	Song	Album	Artist	Role	Ref.
2013	"Blame"	Comfort	Maya Jane Coles	Vocals, co-writing	
2015	"X Marks the Spot"	Shedding Skin	Ghostpoet	Vocals	
2015	"That Ring down the Drain Kind of Feeling"	Shedding Skin	Ghostpoet	Vocals	
2015	"One Way Street"	Only the Now	Tom Robinson	Backing vocals	
2024	"Holes"	Death Songbook	Paraorchestra with Brett Anderson & Charles Hazlewood	Vocals	
2024	"The End of the World"	Death Songbook	Paraorchestra with Brett Anderson & Charles Hazlewood	Vocals	
2025	"Liar"	A Complicated Woman	Self Esteem	Vocals	
2025	"Roustabout"	No Rocket Required	The Moonlandingz	Vocals	
2025	"Lullaby"	Non-album single	Together for Palestine		

=== Compilation-exclusive tracks ===
List of compilation-exclusive tracks, with relevant details
Year	Song	Album	Label	Ref.
2015	"Cannot Leave"	New Moon Vol. III	Killing Moon	

== Music videos ==
List of music videos, with relevant details
Year	Title	Director	Ref.
2012	"Aching Bones"	Ian West	
2013	"To Be a Young Man"	Matthew Cummins	
2013	"Dreary Town"	Matthew Barton	
2013	"Runaway"	Matthew Cummins	
2014	"Stealing Cars"	Matthew Cummins	
2015	"Fool"	Anna Victoria Best	
2017	"Out the Way"	Hand Held Cine Club	
2017	"Yes Men"	—	
2017	"Holiday Destination"	Christian Stephen	
2020	"Ladies for Babies (Goats for Love)"	Matthew Cummins	
2020	"Trad"	Niall Trask	
2023	"Topless Mother"	Lynne Page	
2023	"Twenty Things"	Sel MacLean	
2024	"Greatest Dancer"	Niall Trask	
