= Glastonbury Festival 2015 =

Performing arts festival

- Date: 24 June 2015 – 28 June 2015
- Locations: Pilton, England, United Kingdom
- Previous event: Glastonbury Festival 2014
- Next event: Glastonbury Festival 2016
- Website: www.glastonburyfestivals.co.uk

The 2015 Glastonbury Festival of Contemporary Performing Arts was held from 24 to 28 June 2015.

On 17 June 2015, it was announced that the Foo Fighters had cancelled a number of appearances, including the Friday night headline slot at Glastonbury 2015, due to lead singer Dave Grohl falling off stage and fracturing his leg during the band's concert in Gothenburg, Sweden. Florence and the Machine were announced as their replacement on 17 June. As part of their set, Florence and the Machine performed a cover of the Foo Fighters', "Times Like These", which they dedicated to Grohl.

The biggest crowd of the weekend was drawn by Lionel Richie, who drew 100,000-120,000 people for the "Legend" slot on Sunday afternoon.

== Tickets ==
General Admission Tickets for the festival cost £225.

== Weather ==
The weather was mostly sunny, but it rained quite a lot on Friday afternoon and Sunday morning.

== Line-up ==
=== Stages 1-5 ===
Source: Line up poster

Pyramid Stage
Friday	Saturday	Sunday
Florence and the Machine; 22:15-23:45; The Libertines; 20:20-21:30; Motörhead; 18:30-19:30; Mary J Blige; 16:45-17:45; Alabama Shakes; 15:00-16:00; James Bay; 13:30-14:30; Chronixx; 12:00-12:45; Michael Clark Company; 11:00-11:30	Kanye West; 22:15-23:45; Pharrell Williams; 20:00-21:15; Paloma Faith; 18:15-19:15; Burt Bacharach; 16:30-17:30; George Ezra; 15:00-16:00; The Waterboys; 13:30-14:30; Courtney Barnett; 12:10-13:00; The Unthanks; 11:00-11:45	The Who; 21:15-23:15; Paul Weller; 19:30-20:45; Alt-J; 17:45-18:45; Lionel Richie; 16:00-17:15; Patti Smith; 14:15-15:15; Hozier; 13:00-13:45; Songhoy Blues; 12:00-12:40; Burtle Silver Band; 11:00-11:40

Other Stage
Friday	Saturday	Sunday
Rudimental; 22:30-23:45; Mark Ronson; 21:00-22:00; The Courteeners; 19:30-20:30; The Vaccines; 18:00-19:00; Jungle; 16:30-17:30; Catfish and the Bottlemen; 15:00-16:00; Everything Everything; 13:50-14:30; The Cribs; 12:30-13:20; The Charlatans; 11:00-12:00	Deadmau5; 22:30-23:45; Ben Howard; 20:40-21:55; The Maccabees; 19:05-20:05; Clean Bandit; 17:35-18:35; Ella Eyre; 16:05-17:05; Young Fathers; 14:45-15:45; The Strypes; 13:25-14:15; Frank Turner; 12:00-13:00; Swim Deep; 11:00-11:40	The Chemical Brothers; 21:45-23:15; Jamie T 20:15-21:15; Belle & Sebastian; 18:45-19:45; Future Islands; 17:15-18:45; Twin Atlantic; 15:45-16:45; Palma Violets; 14:15-15:15; Adam Cohen; 13:00-13:50; SOAK; 12:00-12:40; Rival Sons; 11:00-11:40

John Peel Stage
Friday	Saturday	Sunday
Enter Shikari; 22:45-23:45; Modestep; 21:15-22:15; SBTRKT; 19:45-20:45; Circa Waves; 18:25-19:20; Peace; 17:00-18:00; Chet Faker; 16:00-16:40; The Districts; 15:00-15:40; Leon Bridges; 14:00-14:40; Rainy Boy Sleep; 13:00-13:40; Hinds; 12:00-12:40; Weaves; 11:00-11:40	Suede; 22:35-23:45; La Roux; 21:05-22:05; Death from Above 1979; 19:35-20:35; Jessie Ware; 18:15-19:10; Years & Years; 17:00-17:50; The Pop Group; 16:00-16:40; Sleaford Mods; 15:00-15:40; Slaves; 14:00-14:40; Coasts; 13:00-13:40; Sunset Sons; 12:00-12:40; Isaac Lee-Kronick; 11:00-11:40	Franz Ferdinand & Sparks; 22:05-23:15; Death Cab for Cutie; 20:35-21:35; Lianne La Havas; 19:05-20:05; Charli XCX; 17:50-18:35; Django Django; 16:40-17:30; Alvvays; 15:40-16:20; Prides; 14:40-15:20; Saint Raymond; 13:40-14:20; Mini Mansions; 12:40-13:20; Gengahr; 11:40-12:20; Lucy Kitchen; 11:00-11:20

West Holts
Friday 26 June	Saturday 27 June	Sunday 28 June
Hot Chip; Jessie Ware; Atomic Bomb! Band| Goat; Chronixx; Orlando Julius; Bizarre Ride II The Pharcyde| Akua Naru	The Mothership Returns: George Clinton, Parliament, Funkadelic & The Family Stone; Gregory Porter; Vintage Trouble; Mavis Staples; Songhoy Blues; Ibibio Sound Machine; The Skints; K.O.G & The Zongo Brigade	Grace Jones; Run The Jewels; Roy Ayers; Badbadnotgood & Ghostface Killah; Todd Terje and the Olsens; Ghostpoet; Alo Wala; Ephemerals

The Park Stage
Friday 26 June	Saturday 27 June	Sunday 28 June
Super Furry Animals; Jamie xx Wolf Alice; The Pop Group; Shlomo; Foreign Affairs; Charlene Soraia; Lonelady; Declan McKenna	Flying Lotus; Death From Above 1979; Kae Tempest; Gaz Coombes; Beans On Toast; Father John Misty; Ibeyi; Stealing Sheep; St. Paul and The Broken Bones; Cate Ferris	Patti Smith and her band Spiritualized; Sharon Van Etten; Toro Y Moi; Alvvays; TBA; Grant Nicholls; Rhodes; Twin Hidden; King Gizzard & the Lizard Wizard
