= Holiday Destination =

Studio album by Nadine Shah
- Released: 25 August 2017
- Genre: Post-punk; alternative rock
- Length: 50:05
- Label: 1965
- Producer: Ben Hillier

Nadine Shah chronology
Fast Food (2015)	Holiday Destination (2017)	Kitchen Sink (2020)

Holiday Destination is the third studio album by English musician Nadine Shah. It was released on 25 August 2017 under 1965 Records and was produced by Ben Hillier. The album won Independent Album of the Year at the 2018 AIM Independent Music Awards, and shortly afterwards, it was shortlisted for the 2018 Mercury Prize.

== Critical reception ==
Professional ratings
Aggregate scores
Source	Rating
AnyDecentMusic?	7.8/10
Metacritic	81/100
Review scores
Source	Rating
The A.V. Club	B+
AllMusic	4/5 stars
Financial Times	4/5 stars
The Guardian	4/5 stars
Mojo	4/5 stars
Pitchfork	7.6/10
Q	3/5 stars
Record Collector	4/5 stars
The Times	4/5 stars
Uncut	8/10

According to the review aggregator Metacritic, Holiday Destination received "universal acclaim" based on a weighted average score of 81 out of 100 from fifteen critic scores. Another review aggregator, AnyDecentMusic?, gave the album a weighted average score of 7.8 out of 10 based on sixteen critics' reviews.

=== Year-end lists ===
Accolades for Holiday Destination
Publication	Accolade	Rank	Ref.
Gigwise	Top 51 Albums of 2017	6	
Loud and Quiet	Top 40 Albums of 2017	40	
No Ripcord	Top Albums of 2017	23	
The Quietus	Top 100 Albums of 2017	5	

== Track listing ==
All tracks are written by Nadine Shah.

Holiday Destination track listing
No.	Title	Length
1.	"Place Like This"	5:53
2.	"Holiday Destination"	5:39
3.	"2016"	4:47
4.	"Out the Way"	3:50
5.	"Yes Men"	5:41
6.	"Evil"	5:00
7.	"Ordinary"	3:26
8.	"Relief"	4:50
9.	"Mother Fighter"	4:28
10.	"Jolly Sailor"	6:31
Total length:		50:05

== Personnel ==
Credits are adapted from the CD liner notes.

- Nadine Shah
- Ben Hillier
- Peter Wareham
- Ben Nicholls
- Neill MacColl
- Christian Stephen – cover photography

== Chart ==
Chart performance for Holiday Destination
Chart (2017)	Peak position
Scottish Albums (OCC)	57
UK Albums (OCC)	71
UK Independent Albums (OCC)	5
