= Nadine Shah =

English singer-songwriter and actress (born 1986)

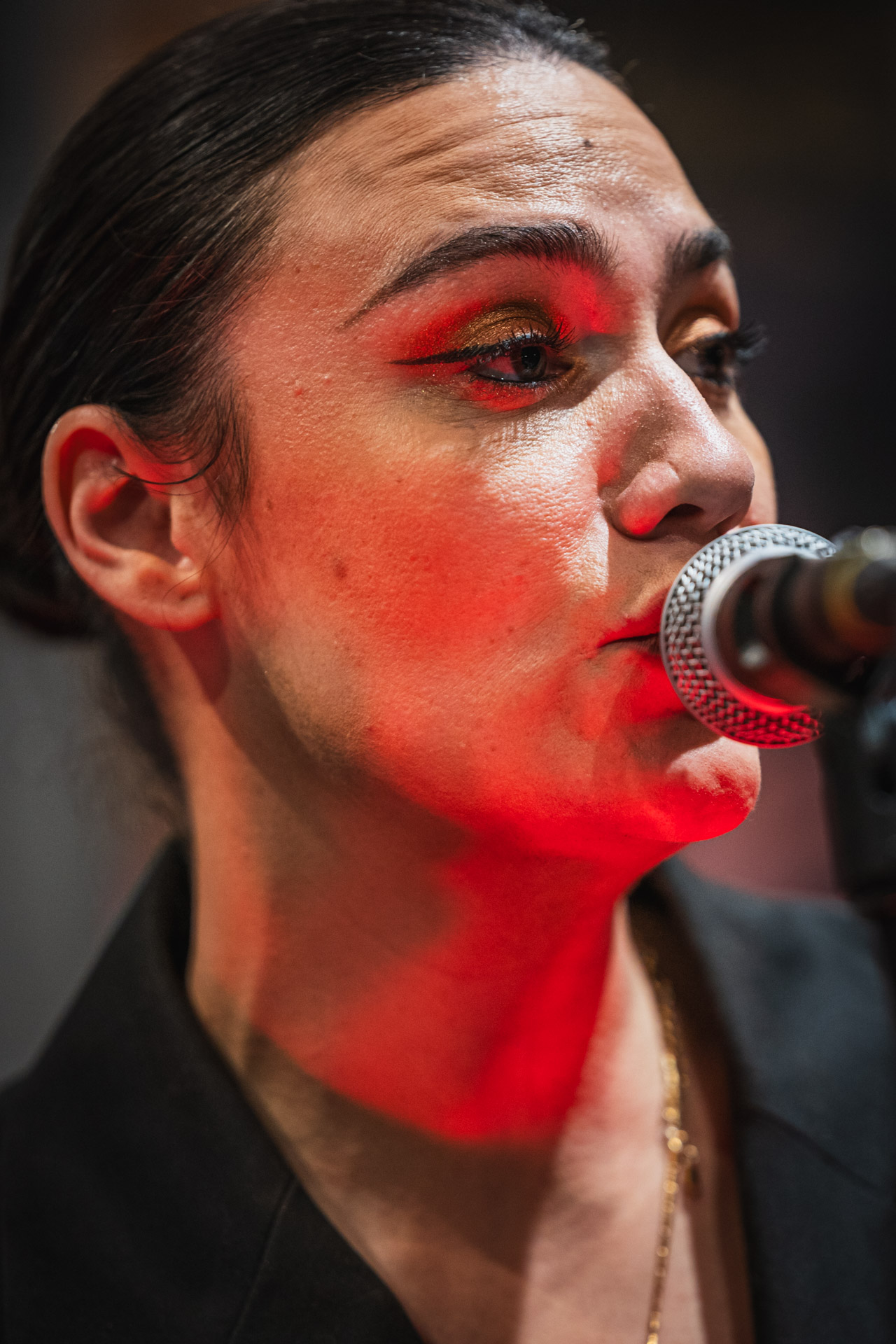
- Shah performing at Resident Music, 2024

Background information
- Born: Nadine Petra Katarina Shah; 16 January 1986 (age 40); Whitburn, Tyne and Wear, England
- Origin: London, England
- Occupations: Singer; songwriter; musician; actress
- Years active: 2005–present
- Website: nadineshah.co.uk
- Musical career
- Genres: Post-punk; alternative rock; gothic pop
- Instruments: Vocals; piano; guitar
- Works: Discography
- Labels: Label Fandango; Apollo; 1965; Infectious; EMI North

Nadine Petra Katarina Shah (born 16 January 1986) is an English singer-songwriter and actress. Noted for her prominent Geordie accent and theatrical vocal delivery, Shah's music has been characterised as post-punk, alternative rock, and gothic pop, with primary influences including Nina Simone and Scott Walker, among others.

Shah was born in Whitburn, South Tyneside to a Pakistani father and an English mother of half-Norwegian descent. She relocated to London as a teenager to pursue a career as a jazz singer, but by nineteen years old, she quit jazz and briefly attended art school before settling on her career as a songwriter. Following a pair of extended plays, her debut studio album, Love Your Dum and Mad, was released in July 2013. It was produced by Ben Hillier, with whom she has since created all of her music. Her third album, Holiday Destination (2017), was nominated for the 2018 Mercury Prize, and her fifth studio album, Filthy Underneath, was released in February 2024.

In 2022, Shah made her acting debut on a stage production of A Midsummer's Night Dream as the character Titania, subsequently earning a nomination at the 2023 WhatsOnStage Awards for Best Professional Debut Performance. She later appeared in a minor role for the film Virginia Woolf's Night and Day (2026), playing a singing suffragette. She is currently acting in and composed music for a David Threlfall-led stage production of King Lear, assuming the role of Goneril.

== Early life ==
=== Childhood ===
Nadine Petra Katarina Shah was born on 16 January 1986 in Whitburn, South Tyneside, England, to parents Heather and Imtiaz. Her mother was born in the UK to a Norwegian father, who worked as a sea captain. Shah's father, a Muslim, was born in Pakistan and immigrated to England in 1971, working at a number of factories until his older brother joined him to start their own curtain businesses. Having found financial success, Shah's parents chose to enroll her at various private schools. Her upbringing was less rooted in the Norwegian side of the family, as her mother did not speak the language. She mostly identified with her father's culture and often thought of herself more as "the foreign kid" at school. A large portion of her extended Pakistani family also resides in the North East of England. Shah continued to be raised in Whitburn, a coastal village, in a home next to clifftops that oversee the North Sea. Her family was not particularly musically-inclined; much of what she listened to were artists from the 1960s and 1970s that her mother had introduced to her. She was also exposed to the Urdu ghazals her father would sing, typically when they were in the car together. Shah also sang, but mostly stuck to pop songs by artists such as Mariah Carey and Whitney Houston. Eventually, she joined a gospel choir, and then she started singing jazz, in particular the standards from the Cole Porter songbook.

=== Moving to London as a jazz singer ===
Around sixteen or seventeen years old, Shah left home to become a professional jazz singer in London, moving into a flat with her brother that her parents paid for. When she began singing jazz professionally, she performed at the PizzaExpress Jazz Club, occasionally meeting notable figures like Mose Allison, whom she claimed to had sung with for one session. Some of the men she knew there helped mentor her vocals, encouraging her to use her native accent, which had started to disappear. In 2021, she told The Guardian that once people began to question her background, "I immediately adopted this thick, Cheryl Cole-esque accent because I didn't want to disappoint them. I've kept it up ever since." She initially sang in a Geordie accent largely for amusement, "but then I realised that I could get these huge vowel sounds. ... it's an accent that a lot of people kinda laugh at, but I didn't want it to sound [like a] novelty." During this period, Shah met and became close friends with a nascent Amy Winehouse, who lived nearby. The pair frequently spent time together in Camden as drinking partners.

=== Art school ===
Eventually, she became disinterested with the jazz standards she had become accustomed to because she was performing other people's material. A year and a half into her career in jazz, Shah quit. As she could not play any instruments, she sought another creative outlet, so she decided to enroll at the Camberwell College of Arts. As she progressed through art school, she first specialised in painting and then switched to photography. One of her lecturers overheard her singing and recommended that she should implement it into her own art, and at that point, she decided to officially start writing her own music. She then dropped out of college to pursue a career in music full-time.

== Career ==
=== 2005–2011: Formative years and meeting Ben Hillier ===
At nineteen years old, Shah officially decided to start her songwriting career, and at twenty, she moved away from London back to her family home in the North East, managed by Steven Brains at the time. She ultimately concluded that moving was a mistake, but due to a lack of money, it took about a year before she returned to London. Shah long searched for a producer but was dissatisfied with her options: "They all seemed very old school and wanted to put strings all over my songs, [and] put the vocal really far forward with heavy reverb." Eventually, she grew more discouraged, but one of her songs, the "Dreary Town" demo, eventually lead to Shah finally securing a producer. A friend had listened to it and sent it to a manager, who ended up managing Shah and relayed the song to Ben Hillier, a producer with credits with bands such as Blur, Depeche Mode, and the Horrors. Shah had long been aware of Hillier, but it was his work on Blur's Think Tank in particular that made the prospect of collaborating with him the most appealing.

Through management, Shah met with Hillier for a cup of coffee, discovering that they shared a similar thought process and taste in music, such as a mutual appreciation for the band Can. After hearing the one song that had been sent to him, Hillier agreed to make a full album with her. For their first session together, they recorded at Shah's home and wrote the demo for the song "Aching Bones". According to Hillier, he sought to continue working together at that point, and since then, they have collaborated for all of Shah's music. Before releasing her first record, Shah decided to spend about three years performing live to hone her skills, mostly in small pubs. The first of these gigs took place at the Electric Boogaloo in Manchester during the In the City festival, which garnered an enthusiastic review on BBC Introducing.

=== 2012–2013: Early EPs and Love Your Dum and Mad ===
By the time she released her debut album, entitled Love Your Dum and Mad, it had been essentially complete for three years, with its songs written as early as eight years prior. With the public knowledge that Shah was preparing to release the album, Shah preceded it with her debut extended play, entitled Aching Bones, on 19 November 2012 under Label Fandango. Its three songs, all written a relatively short three years beforehand, had started more as acoustic compositions, but Shah, aware that it would be her first release, made significant changes to it before it was finished. Preceding the album, Shah issued a second EP entitled Dreary Town on 15 April 2013, this time on Apollo Records. She also featured on British house musician Maya Jane Coles' debut album, Comfort, on the track "Blame" in late June. Both artists had known of each other's work and had shared managers. Recorded in Coles' bedroom, Shah added her own vocal melody on top of Coles' instrumental backing track.

Love Your Dum and Mad was released on 22 July 2013, again on Apollo Records. It was met with acclaim from critics, several of whom referred to it as a emotionally intense record, in large part due to Shah's vocal delivery. A few reviewers noted, however, that the album can be somewhat inaccessible at first, given its dark tone. The lyrics were largely informed by two young men who were Shah's close friends and had both died by suicide. The title is derived from a painting that one of the two men, Michael, made, which was then used for the cover art. The record often addresses social stigmas towards those suffering from mental health illnesses. The writing of Love Your Dum and Mad started on the piano. The first half of the record was performed with a backing band, whereas the other half was performed mostly by herself on vocals and piano. However, once she had finished writing the album, she starting learning to play the guitar as well, When the album was released and she had starting touring, she found it more convenient to transport the guitar around, and she grew increasingly bored with the piano.

In 2013, Shah embarked on her first headlining tour, starting in Europe, intermittently playing at festivals. She returned to Germany that year as a support act for Depeche Mode—who shared Hillier as a producer—during their Delta Machine Tour. On one instance, she opened at Berlin's O_{2} World arena. She later supported Bat for Lashes at Shepherd's Bush Empire in London on 13 August, then toured in the UK for the next two months. In September, the song "Aching Bones" was used in a trailer for the video game Dark Souls II.

=== 2014–2016: Fast Food ===
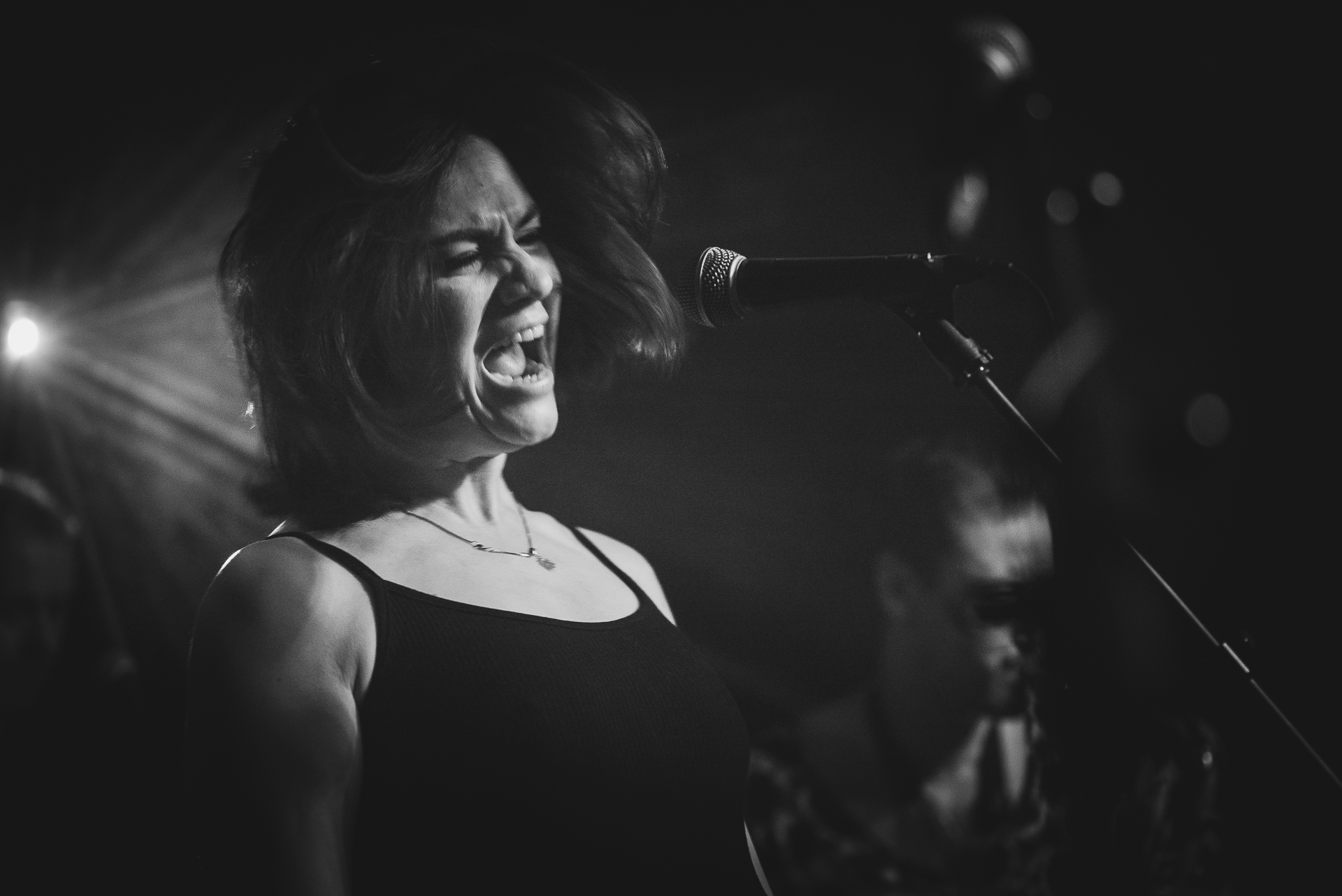
Shah live at The Water Rats, 2016

Led by the single "Stealing Cars" in late 2014, Shah's second album, Fast Food, was released on 6 April 2015, again through Apollo Records. It marked her debut on the UK Albums Chart, reaching number 48. Upon release, Fast Food was acclaimed by critics, with some commenting that the album felt more confident and focused. For this record, Shah wrote the music purely on the guitar, and as such, it is primarily driven by the instrument. The lyrics saw her shift focus away from the subject of mental health stigmas in favour of relationships. Due in part to the lengthy process of her debut album, she spent only two months writing Fast Food.

Also in 2015, Shah contributed a brand new track, "Cannot Leave", to New Moon Vol. III, a compilation album curated by Ally McCrae and released on the London record label Killing Moon. That year, she also appeared on London-based hip-hop artist Ghostpoet's album, Shedding Skin, providing vocals on the tracks "X Marks the Spot" and "That Ring down the Drain Kind of Feeling". In February 2016, it was announced that Shah had scored music for the Northern Stage adaptation of the 1971 British crime drama film Get Carter. This included original pieces and re-imaginings of songs by the 1960s band the Animals.

=== 2017–2019: Holiday Destination ===
Preceded by lead single "Out the Way" and three other tracks, Shah's third studio album, Holiday Destination, was released on 25 August 2017 via 1965 Records. The lyrics took more of a political focus than before, largely inspired by the Syrian refugee crisis. She had previously scored music for an Al Jazeera documentary entitled No Strings (directed by her brother Karim), which depicts a puppeteering company that went to a refugee camp on the border of Turkey and Syria in an effort to aid children who were distrustful of adults. The particular incident that caused Shah to write new music was a TV report that showed tourists on holiday in Kos lacking empathy for the refugees who had been migrating there. Due to the political subject matter and a desire to vary her output, Shah consciously decided to make the music more upbeat and dance-oriented than her previous work. In an interview with Music Week, she said that "rather than having people standing around stroking their chins, I'd rather make a political song that is going to have people dancing in the streets and singing along to it."

Upon release, Holiday Destination saw praise from critics for balancing its inherently political subject matter with accessible music. Morover, the critical acclaim of the album brought wider attention to Shah's music. In 2018, the album won Independent Album of the Year at the annual AIM Independent Music Awards. It was additionally shortlisted for the Mercury Prize but ultimately lost to Wolf Alice's Visions of a Life. During the televised ceremony, Shah performed "Out the Way". She was also nominated for Best Breakthrough Act at the 2018 Q Awards; although she lost the award, she returned next year to become the first female host of the programme, succeeding Mo Gilligan.

=== 2020–2022: Kitchen Sink and acting debut ===
As she grew older, Shah became increasingly frustrated with the societal expectations traditionally imposed upon women, such as getting married and having children. Now 34 years old, a self-described feminist without a spouse or children, those expectations became a source of internal conflict. Inspired by various conversations, Shah started writing a series of observational vignettes exploring gender roles for her fourth album, Kitchen Sink. Given the political nature of her previous album, Holiday Destination, Shah said that people began approaching her with the assumption that her personality would be serious like her music, so she intentionally wrote lyrics with a "playful nature". Musically, the complex rhythms that drive Kitchen Sink was in part inspired by the Talking Heads album Naked (1988), a personal favourite of Shah's.

Led by the single "Ladies for Babies (Goats for Love)", Kitchen Sink was originally scheduled for release on 5 June 2020 via Infectious Music, but due to the onset on the COVID-19 pandemic, the release was delayed to 26 June. Kitchen Sink received widespread critical acclaim, with praise often centered around how it effectively mixes the political messaging with a sense of humour and playfulness. Despite the positive reception, Shah was unable to properly promote the album with a tour because of the pandemic. During lockdown, she debuted an Instagram Live series called Payback where she interviewed a number of music journalists. In June 2021, it was revealed that Shah had signed a deal to publish a book for the Bonnier Books UK imprint Nine Eight Books. At the time of the announcement, Shah said she was still in the process of writing. The publishing director Pete Selby told Music Week that it will cover "grief, fame and human behaviour".

In July 2021, one year after the release of Kitchen Sink, and one day before most of the lockdown restrictions were lifted, Shah performed live in-concert to a socially-distanced audience at The Barbican. It was the first time she was able to perform material from the album, which she played in full. For the encore, she played "Out the Way". Later that year, she opened for the band Suede on several dates during an anniversary tour celebrating the album Coming Up. For the 10 November concert, Shah joined the band onstage at the O2 Victoria Warehouse in Manchester to perform her song "Fool" with them. The next day, she dueted with Brett Anderson for an acoustic rendition of the Suede song "The Wild Ones" at Alexandra Palace in London.

Once the pandemic restrictions eased, she was keen on returning to the recording studio to make her next record. However, with the death of her mother in April 2020, Shah had unknowingly devoloped PTSD. Subsequently, she struggled with substance abuse and nearly attempted suicide in April 2022. She was convinced to go to a rehabilitation center, and shortly after leaving, she briefly forayed into acting in September 2022, playing the role of Titania in a Shakespeare North Playhouse stage production of A Midsummer Night's Dream. Her portrayal garnered a nomination for Best Professional Debut Performance at 2023 WhatsOnStage Awards.

=== 2023–2025: Filthy Underneath and Live in London ===
Shah's experiences with grief, trauma, addiction, and rehabilitation in the preceding years served as the thematic basis for her fifth album, Filthy Underneath. Musical inspiration for the record came from the music she listened to during the grieving process, including Asha Puthli, Googoosh, and glam rock music. In terms of the instrumentals, Filthy Underneath is less reliant on the guitar than her previous work, with heavier emphasis on synthesisers and her vocals. The album track "Sad Lads Anonymous" sees Shah monologue in spoken word on top of a post-punk backing track. Leading with the single "Topless Mother" in late 2023, the album was released on 23 February 2024 under the newly-created major record label EMI North, during which Shah was touring in the UK and Europe in support of Depeche Mode. It marks both a commercial and critical high point for Shah; it is her highest-charting record in the UK to date, peaking at number 25, and reviewers frequently called it a career-best album for Shah.

Two months later, she featured on Death Songbook, an album by Paraorchestra with Brett Anderson and Charles Hazlewood. Prior to recording, she had worked with Paraorchestra before at the Glastonbury Festival. On the album, she contributed vocals for covers of "Holes" by Mercury Rev and "The End of the World" by Skeeter Davis. On 25 May, she appeared on the BBC Two programme Later... with Jools Holland to perform two songs from Filthy Underneath: "Topless Mother" and "Greatest Dancer". Soon afterwards, Shah said that she rejected a non-televised offer to play at the upcoming Glastonbury Festival, explaining that it would have been too expensive to justify appearing.

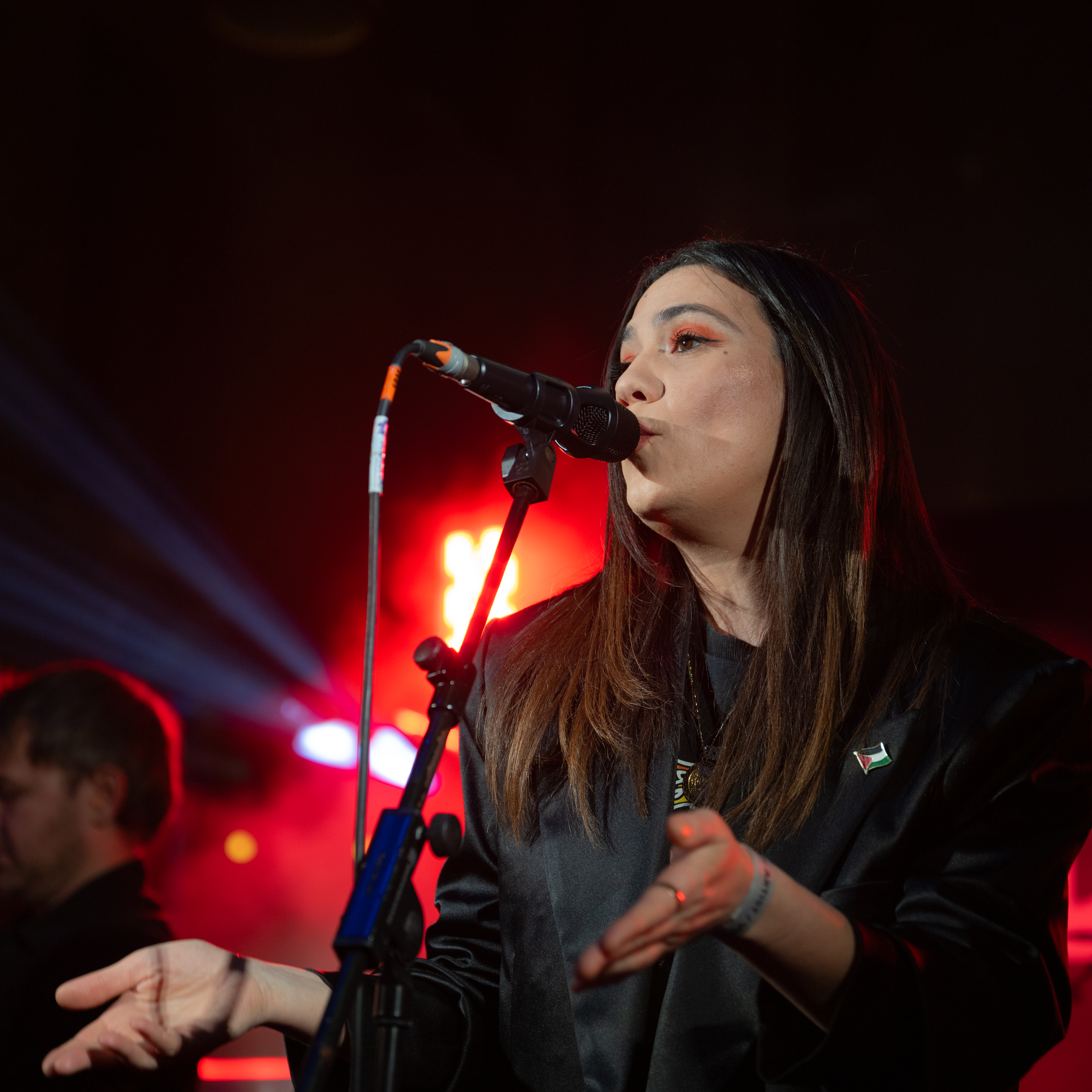
Shah live at SXSW London, June 2026

On 16 May 2025, Shah released her first-ever live album, Live in London, through EMI North. It was recorded the previous November at the O_{2} Forum Kentish Town in London, the largest headlining show of her career up to that point. One month prior to the live album's release, she featured as a vocalist on Self Esteem's album A Complicated Woman for the song "Liar", and later that year, she supported Self Esteem on tour in the UK. She also toured in the UK and North America in support of the Pogues around this time. Shah returned to the Glastonbury Festival in 2025 with a politically-charged set on the Other Stage addressing the concurrent Gaza genocide. This occurred the day after two appearances by Bob Vylan and Kneecap that became sources of controversy. On 12 December 2025, Shah appeared alongside several other musicians on the charity single "Lullaby", a reimagining of the Palestinian lullaby "Yamma Mwel El Hawa". Aimed towards aiding Gazan families, the song was in benefit of the Together for Palestine Fund, organised by the Choose Love charity.

=== 2026–present: Further acting roles and sixth studio album ===
In February 2026, Shah revealed on her Instagram that she was in the process of making her sixth studio album at Konk Studios. It is scheduled for release on April 2027. In the interim, she appeared in a sung cameo role in the film Virginia Woolf's Night and Day in June 2026, playing a suffragette during the early twentieth century. The following 11 July, she participated at a live tribute of David Bowie's 1972 album The Rise and Fall of Ziggy Stardust... at the Royal Festival Hall in Southbank Centre, London. Arranged and orchestrated by Fiona Brice, Shah sang "It Ain't Easy" and "Suffragette City", accompanied by the Sauti choir (Southbank Centre's in-house choir) and a thirty-piece orchestral rock ensemble. On 24 July, Shah performed with the Royal Northern Sinfonia at The Glasshouse, Gateshead, as part of the BBC Proms. Since 2 October, she has been appearing as Goneril in a stage adaptation of King Lear, directed by Matthew Dunster and led by David Threlfall, at the Royal Exchange Theatre in Manchester, England. She also composed the music for the play, which is scheduled to continue until 15 November.

== Musical style and influences ==
Shah's music has been described as post-punk, alternative rock, and gothic pop. She sings with a prominent Geordie accent, and her voice has been frequently noted for its theatricality. As early as her debut EPs and album, Shah was widely compared to a number of artists, particularly Nick Cave and PJ Harvey. However, while she said she did not mind the comparisons, she had never listened to either artist by the time she began writing. As a child, her Pakistani father would often sing Urdu ghazals to her, and as she grew older she began to appreciate them more, speculating if they were a subconscious influence. During childhood, however, Shah mostly sang pop songs by Mariah Carey and Whitney Houston, instilling a habit of inserting trills and vibrato into her vocals. At thirteen, she started getting singing lessons from a teacher who discouraged those habits by having her listen often to k.d. lang. In 2013, she explained: "I'd put in extra notes all the time and every song was an opportunity to show off, instead of being an opportunity to portray an emotion or a story." After moving to London, her peers helped mentor her further away from the Carey and Houston-style vocals.

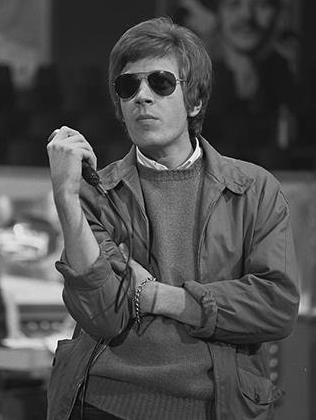
Scott Walker (pictured) was a primary influence on Shah's early work.

One of Shah's favourite artists is Nina Simone. During her time as a jazz singer in London, she started listening to Simone, and she quickly became enraptured with the imperfections and perceived honesty of her vocal delivery. Amongst the other jazz artists she had been listening to, the fact that Simone incorporated classical piano into her own self-written music stood out, and ultimately, this inspired Shah to abandon the Cole Porter repertoire and leave jazz. Another favourite artist of Shah's is Scott Walker. In 2012, she said that the "menacing sound" she pursued for her debut EP Aching Bones was primarily influenced by him, specifying her favourite Walker album as his self-titled album. She has since referred to Scott 3 instead as her favourite. Shah first listened to him after showing the "Aching Bones" demo to a friend, whom invited her to watch the Walker documentary 30th Century Man, and after listening to more of his music, he became a quick favourite. Shah said that later on, she met him briefly at a bar after watching Jarvis Cocker perform Walker's "Plastic Palace People" during the BBC Proms in Albert Hall. Other influential artists Shah has referenced include Selda Bağcan, Googoosh, and Amy Winehouse. During her stint in jazz, she was briefly friends with Winehouse, who showed her early demos for Frank; Shah has since credited the recordings as a key factor into wanting to write music of her own.

== Activism ==
In November 2019, along with 34 other musicians, Shah signed a letter endorsing the Labour Party leader Jeremy Corbyn in the 2019 UK general election with a call to end austerity. In March 2020, she voiced her support for the newly-elected Labour Party leader Keir Starmer. Shah provided testimony to the UK government's Digital, Culture, Media and Sport Committee as part of an ongoing probe into the economics of music streaming in November 2020, citing a lack of transparency regarding musicians' royalty payments. In 2025, Shah posted "Fuck the BBC" on Instagram, in response to the BBC pulling the documentary Gaza: Medics Under Fire before airing. Citing concerns of impartiality, the network refused to air the film, which was directed by Shah's brother, Karim. The documentary, later titled Gaza: Doctors Under Attack, was ultimately picked up and aired by Channel 4 and won the Best Current Affairs award at the 2026 BAFTAs.

Also in 2025, Shah voiced support for Kneecap singer Mo Chara, who was charged on a terrorism-related offense that alleged that he waved a Hezbollah flag during a London concert the previous November. The band maintained that the flag had been thrown onstage by an audience member, and they denied ever supporting Hezbollah or Hamas. The organisation Love Music Hate Racism announced that Shah would join a protest in defense of Kneecap in front of the courthouse where Chara was scheduled to have his full hearing.

At the 2025 Glastonbury Festival, Shah performed in front of a large screen displaying a moving collage designed by Cold War Steve, ending with a depiction of Starmer serving cocktails to Benjamin Netanyahu and Donald Trump against a backdrop of war-torn Gaza. Towards the end of the set, she read out an open letter by Artists for Palestine UK that indicated support for the direct action organisation Palestine Action, whose aim is to disarm Israel for its a role in genocide. At the time, the UK government was proposing to proscribe Palestine Action as a terrorist organisation. After the final song, voice recordings of Palestinian children were played. In September, Shah joined the No Music for Genocide boycott to geo-block her music from streaming platforms in Israel in further protest of genocide.

== Personal life ==
As early as her debut album, Shah has often focused on mental health as one of her most important issues. Shah suffers from endometriosis. She is a Muslim, and of her career in music, she said "[if] it inspires any young Muslim women to pick up a guitar and play a song, that’s brilliant". In 2020, she lived with her partner, a filmmaker, in Ramsgate, Kent.

In 2018, her mother was diagnosed with stage 4 cancer, and Shah moved from London back to Whitburn to help take care of her. While the initial prognosis predicted that she would live a few more years, the COVID-19 pandemic lockdown caused her condition to worsen faster than expected. She died in August 2020. As a result, Shah developed PTSD and struggled with drug addiction. Around Easter 2022, she attempted suicide and subsequently moved into a rehab facility for two months. As of 2024, Shah resides in Newcastle.

== Discography ==
=== Studio albums ===
- Love Your Dum and Mad (2013)
- Fast Food (2015)
- Holiday Destination (2017)
- Kitchen Sink (2020)
- Filthy Underneath (2024)

=== Extended plays ===
- Aching Bones (2012)
- Dreary Town (2013)

== Acting credits ==
=== Theatre ===
Year	Title	Role	Director(s)	Venue	Ref.
2022	A Midsummer Night's Dream	Titania	Matthew Dunster and Jimmy Fairhurst	Shakespeare North Playhouse, Prescot, England	
2026	King Lear	Goneril	Matthew Dunster	Royal Exchange Theatre, Manchester, England	

=== Film ===
Year	Title	Role	Director	Ref.
2026	Virginia Woolf's Night and Day	Suffragette	Tina Gharavi	

== Awards and nominations ==
Year	Organisation	Category	Work	Result	Ref.
2018	AIM Independent Music Awards	Independent Album of the Year	Holiday Destination	Won	
2018	Mercury Prize	Album of the Year	Holiday Destination	Shortlisted	
2018	Q Awards	Best Breakthrough Act	Herself	Shortlisted	
2023	WhatsOnStage Awards	Best Professional Debut Performance	Herself	Shortlisted	
2025	AIM Independent Music Awards	Best Live Performer	Herself	Longlisted	
