= Filthy Underneath =

Studio album by Nadine Shah
- Released: 23 February 2024
- Length: 49:30
- Label: EMI North
- Producer: Ben Hillier

Nadine Shah chronology
Kitchen Sink (2020)	Filthy Underneath (2024)

Filthy Underneath is the fifth studio album by the English musician Nadine Shah, released on 23 February 2024 through EMI North. It received acclaim from critics.

== Background ==
The writing on the album was influenced by Shah's mother's death during the COVID-19 pandemic as well as her own substance abuse, suicide attempt and the end of her marriage.

== Critical reception ==
Professional ratings
Aggregate scores
Source	Rating
AnyDecentMusic?	8.3/10
Metacritic	87/100
Review scores
Source	Rating
AllMusic	4/5 stars
The Line of Best Fit	8/10
Mojo	4/5 stars
NME	4/5 stars
Record Collector	4/5 stars
The Times	4/5 stars
Uncut	9/10

Filthy Underneath received a score of 87 out of 100 on review aggregator Metacritic based on eleven critics' reviews, indicating "universal acclaim". The reviews aggregated on AnyDecentMusic? collectively rated it an 8.3 out of 10, based on 19 critics' scores.

Mojo called it "brilliantly executed with Shirley Bassey-like surety in an arresting, always distinctive, lyrical voice". Uncut's Daniel Dylan Wray stated that "guitars take a backseat role here and are generally utilised for adding texture and atmosphere, while synths are plentiful. Itchy, propulsive post-punk-esque rhythms are largely ditched for a more glacial and unfurling pace that gives Shah's voice room to breathe and soar".

Reviewing the album for AllMusic, Marcy Donelson called it, "far from dispirited, as [Shah] yet again tweaks her theatrical, gothy art-rock sound toward something that's glossy, dissonant, and primordial, with consistently strong grooves, thumping unison tom-toms, and Eastern musical modes weaving their way in throughout." David Pollock of Record Collector described it as "a work of compelling, visceral humanity" and "a record to fall in love with". The Quietus' Amanda Farah found that it is "a strong sense of rhythm—one that has propelled Shah's catalogue—that adds a subversive infectiousness on Filthy Underneath".

Will Hodgkinson of The Times praised it as "a bold and original album about her crisis years, free of self-pity and oddly uplifting", adding that "her voice... bridges the gap between Shirley Bassey and Siouxsie Sioux". Writing for The Line of Best Fit, John Amen commented, "With Filthy Underneath, Shah doesn't necessarily reinvent herself, though she certainly recommits to honesty, vulnerability, and stepping out of comfort zones, all the while documenting an important self-initiation". In NME, Max Pilley declared, "Shah is writing about the darkest places a person can reach in a devastatingly human manner that demonstrates a rare level of repose and reflection."

=== Year-end lists ===
Select year-end rankings for Filthy Underneath
Publication/critic	Accolade	Rank	Ref.
BBC Radio 6 Music	26 Albums of the Year 2024	-	
Uncut	80 Best Albums of 2024	60	

== Track listing ==
All tracks are written by Nadine Shah and Ben Hillier, except where noted.

Filthy Underneath track listing
No.	Title	Length
1.	"Even Light"	4:07
2.	"Topless Mother"	3:17
3.	"Food for Fuel" (Shah, Hillier, Dan Crook)	5:06
4.	"You Drive, I Shoot" (Shah, Hillier, Crook)	2:53
5.	"Keeping Score" (Shah, Hillier, Crook)	4:27
6.	"Sad Lads Anonymous"	5:08
7.	"Greatest Dancer"	5:25
8.	"See My Girl" (Shah, Hillier, Ben Nicholls)	4:39
9.	"Twenty Things"	5:25
10.	"Hyperrealism"	4:03
11.	"French Exit"	5:00
Total length:		49:30

== Personnel ==
Musicians

- Nadine Shah – vocals
- Dan Crook – programming (track 3), keyboards (4, 10), guitar (4); drum programming, synth bass (5); Moog bass (10)
- Nick Etwell – trumpet (tracks 1, 2, 7)
- Ben Hillier – guitar (tracks 1–9, 11), drums (1–7, 9), keyboards (1, 3–11), harmonium (2), percussion (3, 4), bass (4, 5, 7–9), Moog bass (6), piano (7, 10), background vocals (7), programming (8, 11)
- David Liddell – trombone (tracks 1, 2, 7)
- Ben Nicholls – bass (tracks 1–7), keyboards (3, 10), guitar (7)
- Pete Wareham – baritone saxophone, tenor saxophone, horn arrangement (tracks 1, 2, 7)

Technical

- Dan Crook – mixing, engineering
- Ben Hillier – production, mixing
- Katie Tavini – mastering

== Charts ==
Chart performance for Filthy Underneath
Chart (2024)	Peak position
Scottish Albums (Official Charts)	4
UK Albums (Official Charts)	25
