= Fast Food (album) =

Studio album by Nadine Shah
- Released: 6 April 2015
- Studio: The Pool, London; Panarific, London
- Genre: Gothic rock
- Length: 41:07
- Label: Apollo
- Producer: Ben Hillier

Nadine Shah chronology
Love Your Dum and Mad (2013)	Fast Food (2015)	Holiday Destination (2017)

Singles from Fast Food
- 1. "Stealing Cars" Released: 18 November 2014; 2. "Fool" Released: 18 February 2015

Fast Food is the second album by the English singer-songwriter Nadine Shah, released on 6 April 2015 by Apollo Records and produced by Ben Hillier. The album was preceded by the singles "Stealing Cars" and "Fool" and marked Shah's first entry onto the UK album charts at no. 48.

== Style and artwork ==
The album has been considered as a stylistic continuation of her debut album Love Your Dum and Mad (2013) which was seen as reminiscent of Nick Cave and PJ Harvey. As said by Jayson Greene in a review for Pitchfork, "while you can't exactly hear Rid of Me or The Boatman's Call resounding in Fast Food, she shares a certain sea-swept melancholy and a preoccupation with power." Often described as containing elements of goth music, Fast Food drew additional comparisons to the theatrics of Siouxsie Sioux and the guitar work of the band Interpol, the latter whom Shah has pointed to as a personal favorite. Lyrically, as opposed to the preceding album which largely addressed themes of mental health, Fast Food focused more on the positive and negative aspects of relationships.

Shah spoke of the artwork in an interview with Sammy Maine for Rookie: "I just wanted to portray a sort of femme fatale type character, and I wanted all the artwork on this album to be very coherent. So I wanted three very vivid colors to be present – red, blue, and green ... I was looking at loads of different artwork and the thing that stood out to me the most were these images from '70s Italian horror films."

== Promotion and release ==
Two singles preceded the release of Fast Food. The lead single "Stealing Cars" debuted on 18 November 2014, marking her first music release in over a year after her debut album Love Your Dum and Mad. The second single, "Fool", was released the following year on 18 February. A music video for "Fool" directed by Anna Victoria Best followed in March.

Fast Food was released on 6 April 2015, and with it, Shah made her debut on the UK Albums Chart, peaking at no. 48. Additionally, the single "Fool" peaked at no. 51 on the UK Physical Singles Chart.

== Critical reception ==
Professional ratings
Aggregate scores
Source	Rating
AnyDecentMusic?	7.4/10
Metacritic	78/100
Review scores
Source	Rating
AllMusic	4/5 stars
DIY	4/5 stars
Drowned in Sound	8/10
The Guardian	4/5 stars
The Line of Best Fit	8.5/10
Mojo	3/5 stars
MusicOMH	3.5/5 stars
Pitchfork	6.7/10
The Skinny	4/5 stars
Uncut	8/10

According to the review aggregator Metacritic, Fast Food received "generally favorable reviews" based on a weighted average score of 78 out of 100 from 11 critic scores. Another aggregator AnyDecentMusic? gave the album 7.4 out of 10 based on 13 critical reviews. Comparing to its predecessor Love Your Dum and Mad, The Line of Best Fit reviewer Laurence Day said that while "isn't as labyrinthine as her debut ... it is just as powerful." Over at AllMusic, David Jeffries said "even if the first cut is the deepest, ... Fast Food is still wicked sharp."

In a four star review, Tim Lee of DIY Magazine found the album to be "pretty successful in capturing the ups and downs of complicated relationships ... in a way which is neither hackneyed or predictable". In Uncut, Fiona Sturges said "Most captivating of all is Shah's voice that, veering between a gentle croon and semi-operatic howl, sends tiny shards through the heart." Glyn Brown of Mojo Magazine gave a more mixed assessment, saying that the album could have done with "a little less aggrieved gothic pomp" on tracks such as "Fast Food" and "Matador".

In a review for Drowned in Sound, Paul Brown said "The songs on this record have been delivered with the kind of aplomb that only someone with an unshakeable confidence in their work can muster, which suggests that Nadine Shah's artistic future is mouthwatering." Steven Johnson of musicOMH was similarly optimistic, saying the album "Forthcoming years will almost certainly offer her more opportunities to further develop her style and maybe pursue different approaches, but in the meantime Fast Food is a well-defined and powerful musical statement".

=== Accolades ===
Publication	Accolade	Rank	Ref.
Drowned in Sound	Favourite Albums of the Year 2015	96	
Time Out	The 50 Best Albums of 2015	15	

== Track listing ==
All tracks are written by Nadine Shah and Ben Hillier, with additional writing by Nick Webb ("Nothing Else to Do") and David Stith ("Washed Up").

Fast Food track listing
No.	Title	Length
1.	"Fast Food"	3:54
2.	"Fool"	4:42
3.	"Matador"	3:54
4.	"Divided"	4:47
5.	"Nothing Else to Do"	4:55
6.	"Stealing Cars"	4:04
7.	"Washed Up"	3:07
8.	"The Gin One"	3:12
9.	"Big Hands"	3:49
10.	"Living"	4:43
Total length:		41:07

== Personnel ==
Credits are adapted from the CD liner notes.

- Nadine Shah – vocals, guitar (tracks 1–3, 7), piano (7, 9), bass (10)
- Ben Hillier – drums (except 5), guitar (except 3), bass (3, 8, 9), percussion (1, 10), VCS3 synthesizer (6), piano (10)
- Neill MacColl – guitar (except 9), guitaret (9), percussion (1)
- Nick Webb – guitar, cornet (5)
- Peter Jobson – bass (2, 5–7), synth (1, 10), piano (3, 4), percussion (1)
- Ben Nichols – guitar (1, 6, 7), piano (6), lap steel guitar (8)
- Garo Nahoulakian – guitar (3, 4)
- Horse Radish Tree – guitar solo (5)
- DM Stith – vocals (7)

Technical and design

- Ben Hillier – production
- Drew Smith – engineering
- Jonathan Sagis – assistant engineering
- Matthew Wiggins, Kristian Donaldson – additional engineering
- Bunt Stafford-Clark – mastering
- Simon Webb – photography
- DM Stith – collage, layout

== Charts ==
=== Album ===
Chart (2015)	Peak position
Scottish Albums (OCC)	85
UK Albums (OCC)	48
UK Independent Albums (OCC)	8

=== Singles ===
"Fool"
Chart (2015)	Peak position
UK Physical Singles (OCC)	51
