= Other Stage =

Stage at the Glastonbury Festival

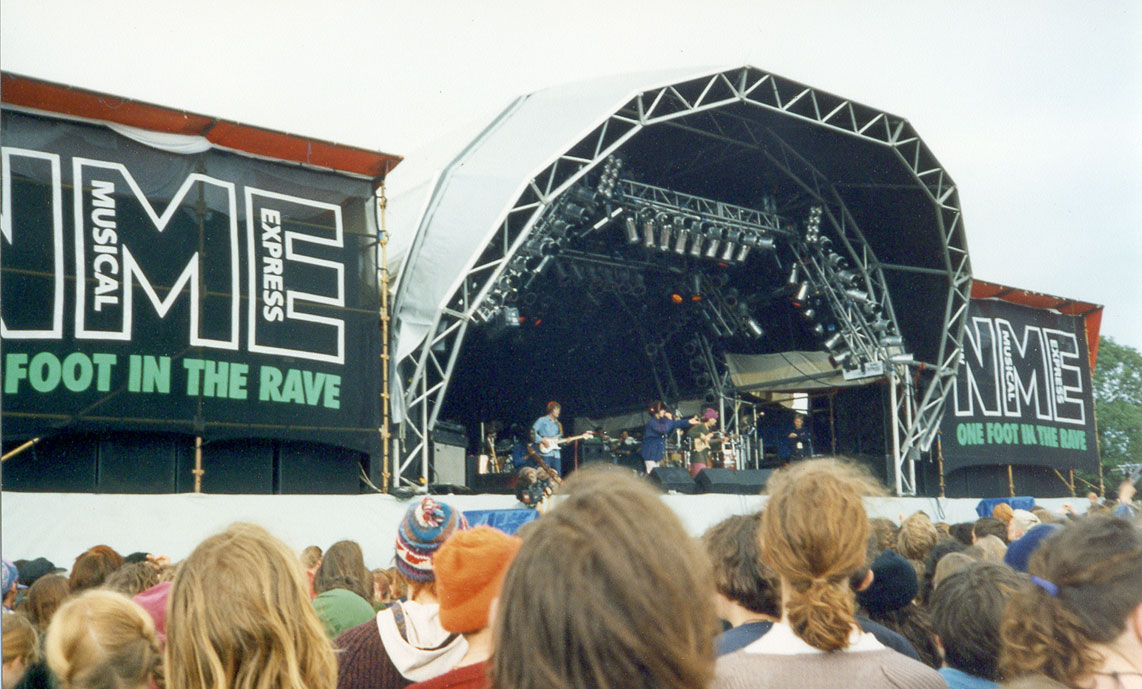
NME stage at the 1993 festival

The Other Stage is the second stage of the Glastonbury Festival, a greenfield music and performing arts festival on farm land near Pilton, England. The festival takes place on many different stages and performance areas. The site is organised around a restricted backstage compound, with the Pyramid Stage on the north, and Other stage on the south of the compound.

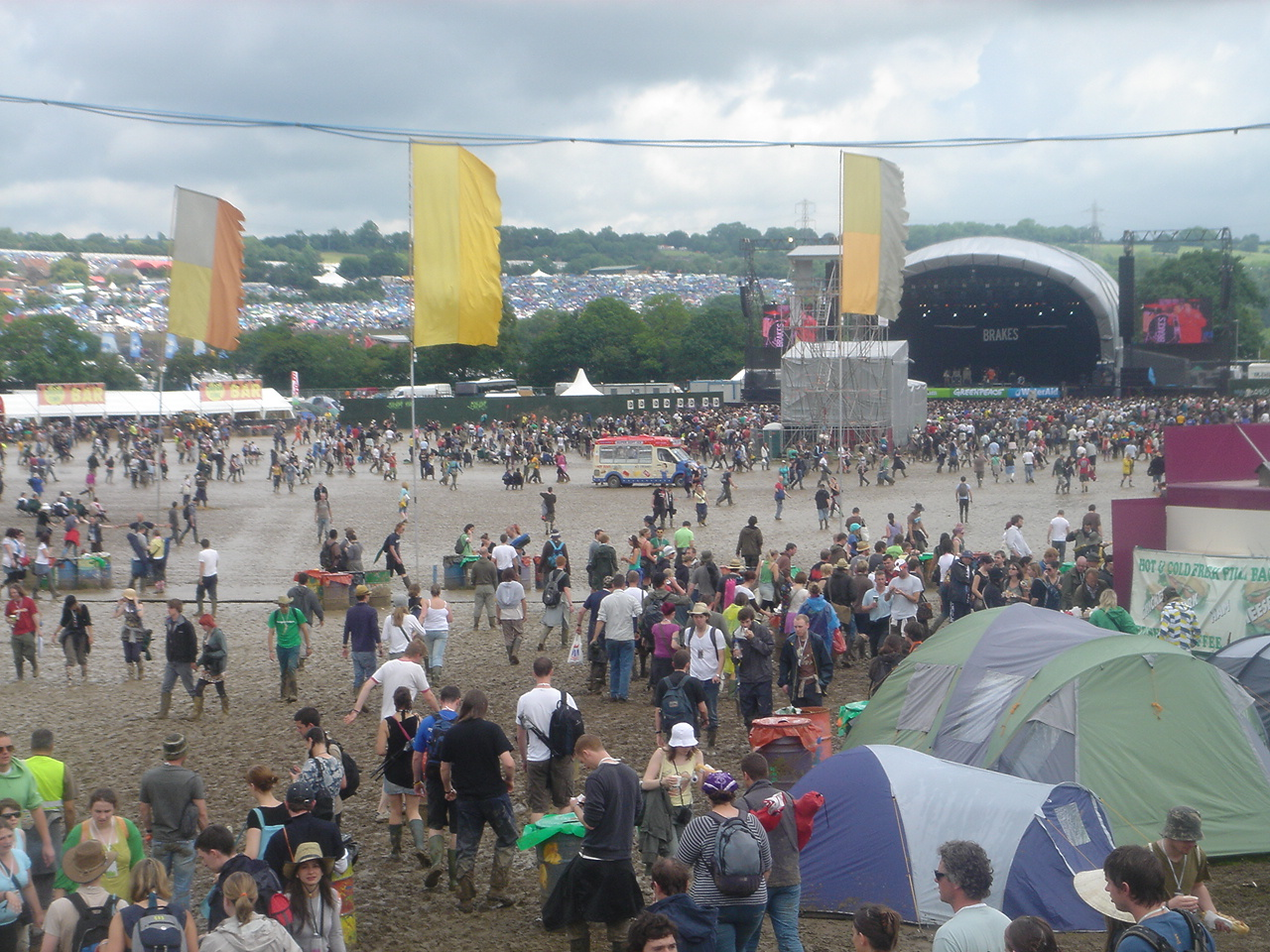
Mud at the "Other Stage" 2007

== 2025 ==
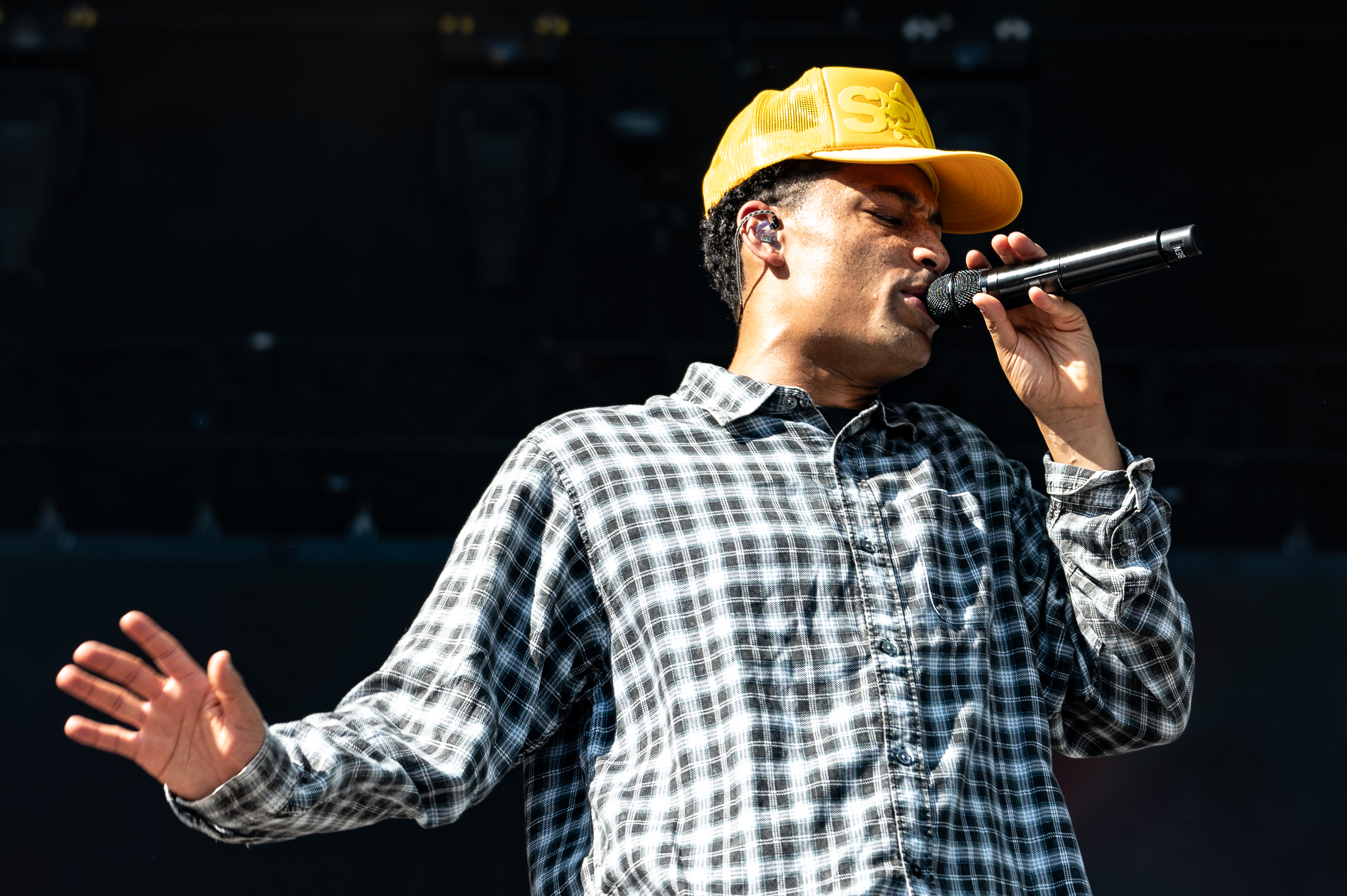
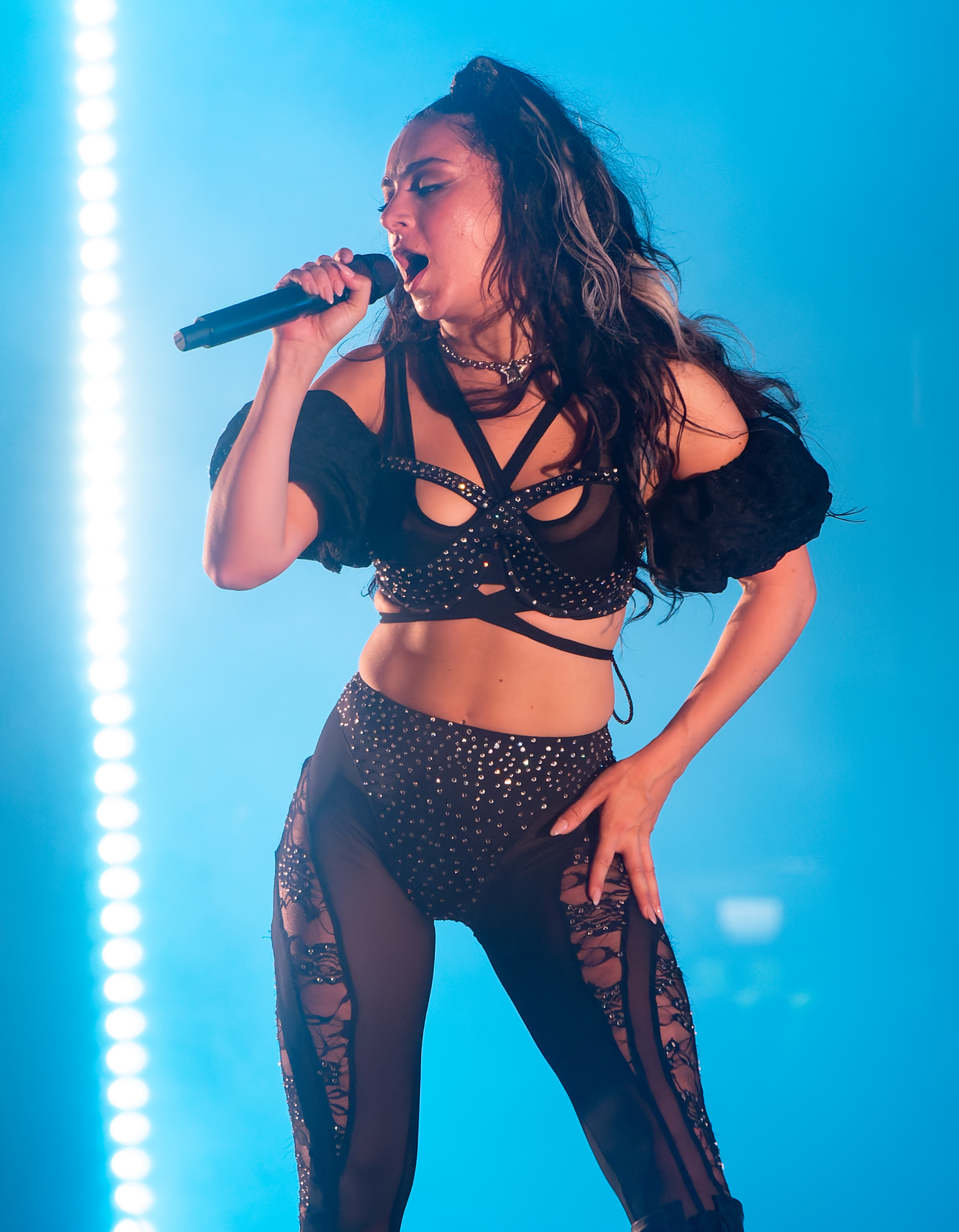
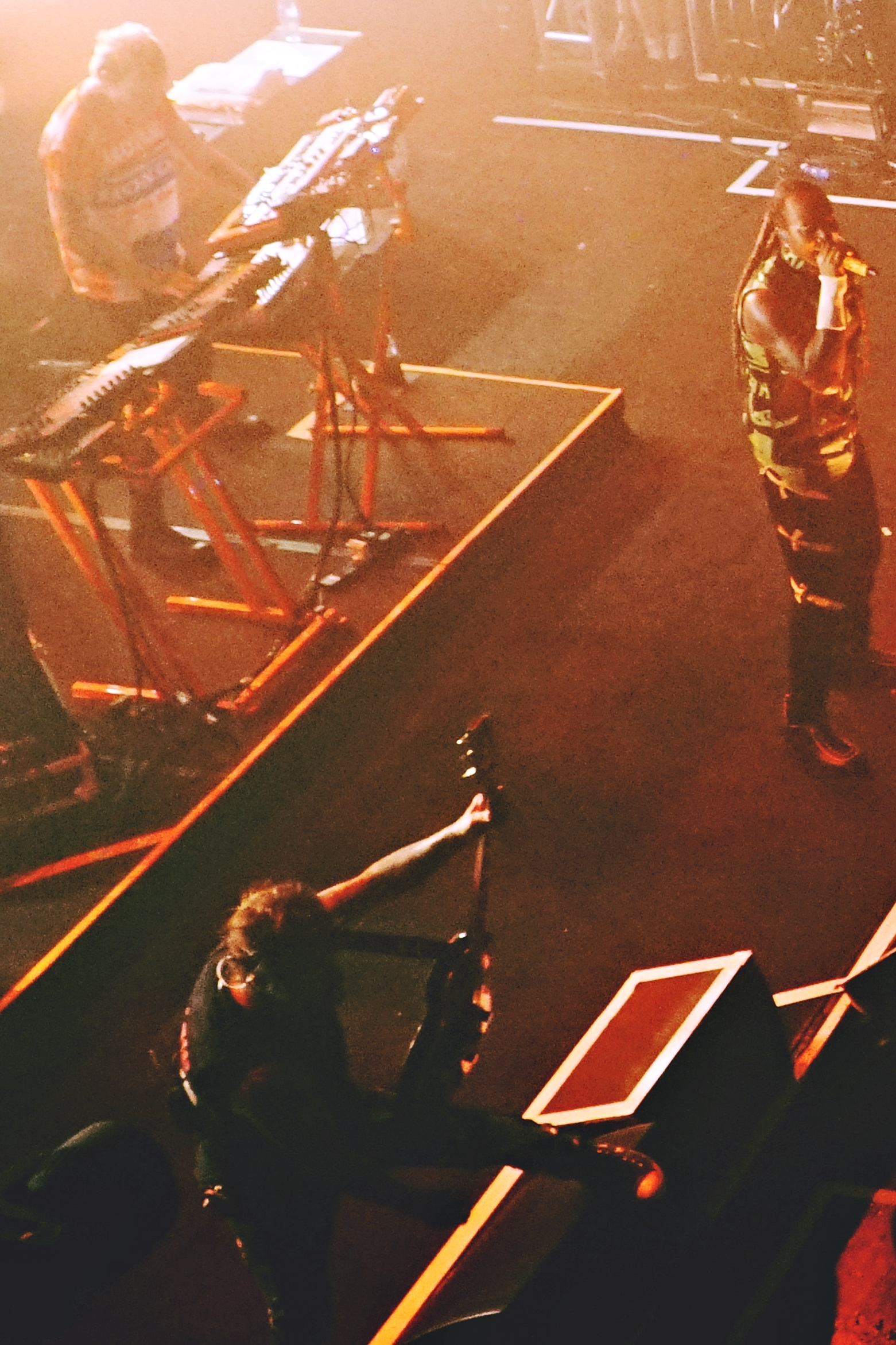
Other Stage headliners Loyle Carner, Charli XCX and the Prodigy.

Friday	Saturday	Sunday
Loyle Carner^{[A]} 22:30 – 23:45; Busta Rhymes^{[B]} 20:30 – 21:30; Gracie Abrams; 18:45 – 19:45; Franz Ferdinand^{[C]} 17:15 – 18:15; Wet Leg; 15:45 – 16:45; Inhaler; 14:15 – 15:15; Rizzle Kicks; 13:00 – 13:45; Fabio & Grooverider; 11:30 – 12:30	Charli XCX; 22:30 – 23:45; Skepta; 20:30 – 21:30; Ezra Collective^{[D]} 19:00 – 20:15; Amyl and the Sniffers; 17:00 – 18:00; Weezer; 15:30 – 16:30; Beabadoobee; 14:00 – 15:00; Good Neighbours; 12:45 – 13:45; Alessi Rose; 11:30 – 12:15	The Prodigy; 21:45 – 23:15; Wolf Alice; 19:45 – 20:45; Snow Patrol; 18:00 – 19:00; Turnstile; 16:30 – 17:30; Joy Crookes; 15:00 – 16:00; Shaboozey; 13:45 – 14:30; Nadine Shah; 12:30 – 13:15; Louis Dunford; 11:15 – 12:00

A. Loyle Carner's set featured a guest appearance from Sampha and Jorja Smith.
B. Busta Rhymes' set featured Spliff Star and DJ Scratch as part of his band.
C. Franz Ferdinand's set featured guest appearances from Peter Capaldi and Master Peace.
D. Ezra Collective's set featured guest appearances from Kojey Radical, Loyle Carner, and Sasha Keable.

== 2024 ==
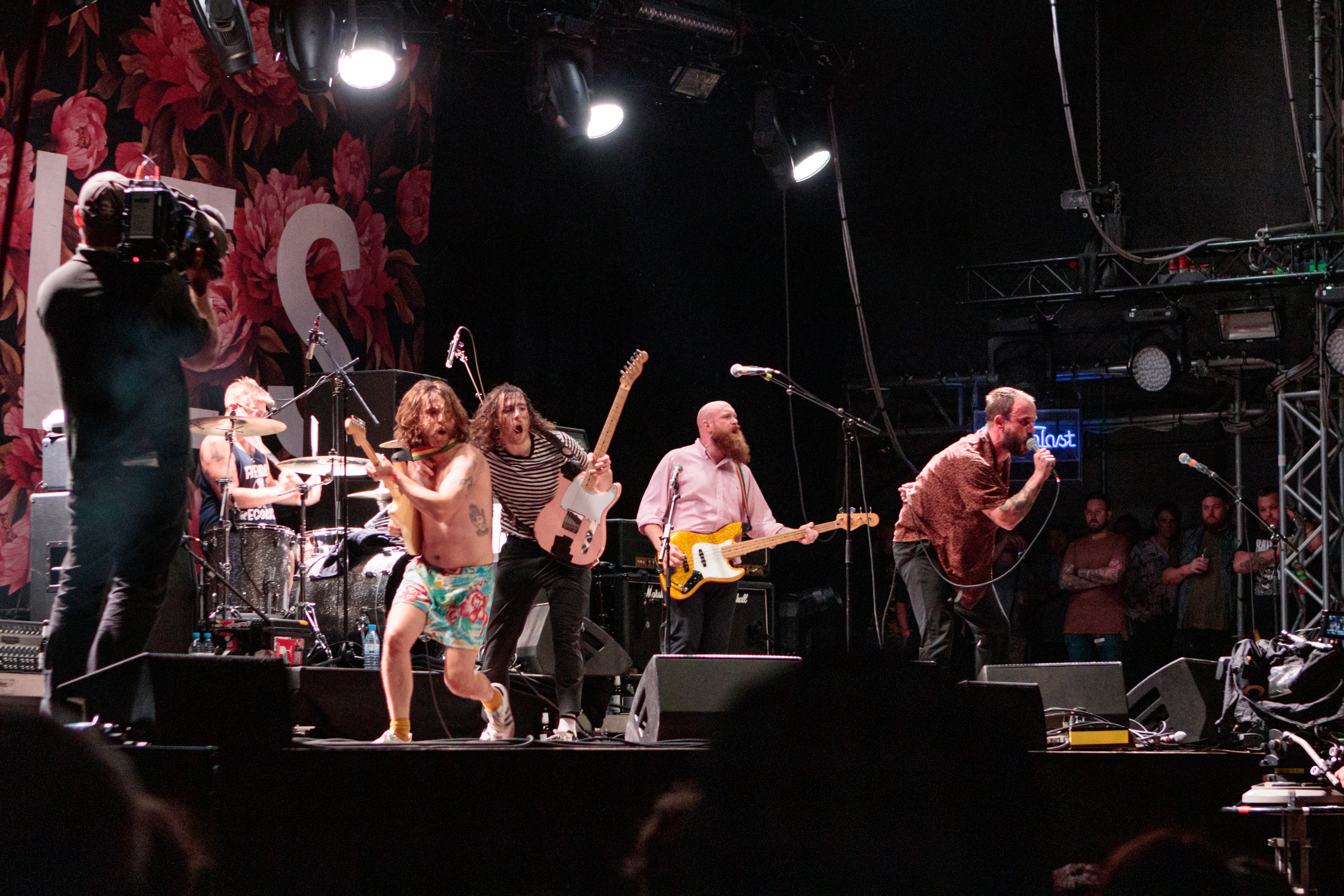
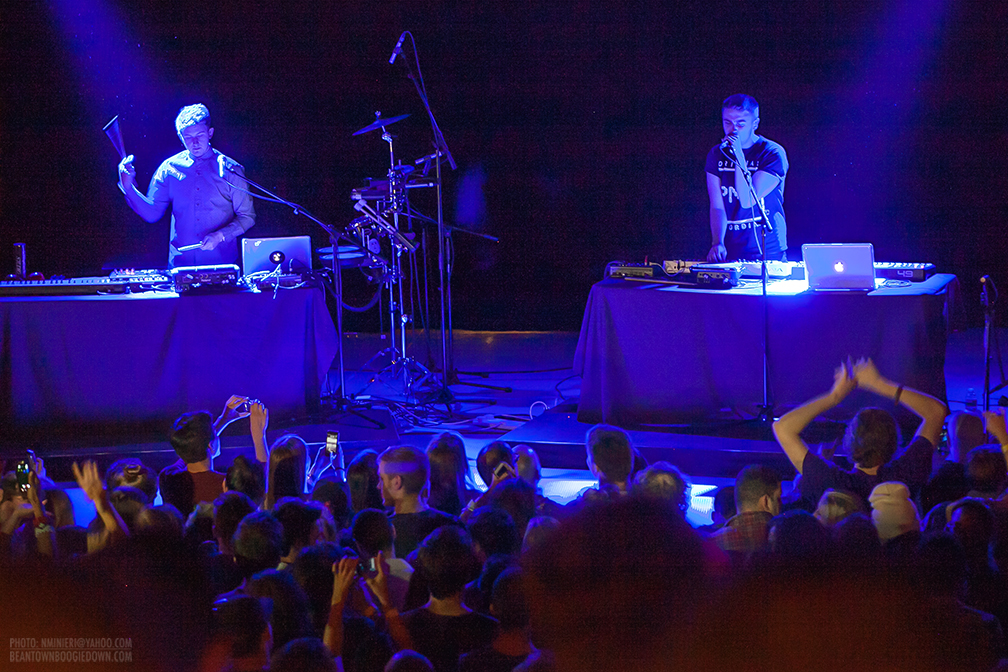
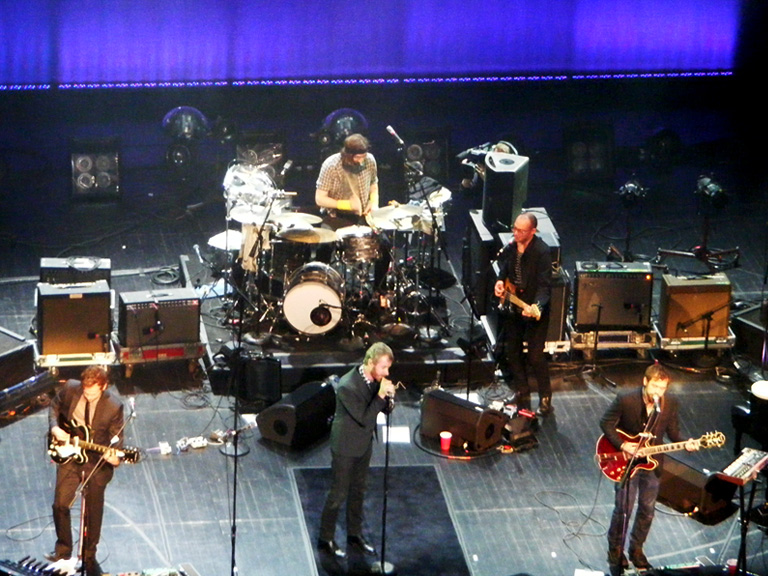
Other Stage headliners Idles, Disclosure and The National.

Friday	Saturday	Sunday
Idles^{[A]} 22:15 – 23:30; D-Block Europe^{[B]} 20:30 – 21:30; Anne-Marie^{[C]} 18:45 – 19:45; Bombay Bicycle Club^{[D]} 17:15 – 18:15; Confidence Man; 15:45 – 16:45; Headie One; 14:15 – 15:15; The Snuts; 13:00 – 13:45; Annie Mac; 11:30 – 12:30	Disclosure^{[E]} 22:30 – 23:45; The Streets; 20:30 – 21:30; Camila Cabello; 18:45 – 19:45; Bloc Party; 17:15 – 18:15; The Last Dinner Party; 15:45 – 16:45; Tems; 14:15 – 15:15; The Staves; 13:00 – 13:45; Jamie Webster; 11:45 – 12:30	The National^{[F]} 21:45 – 23:15; Two Door Cinema Club; 19:45 – 20:45; Avril Lavigne; 18:00 – 19:00; Nothing But Thieves; 16:30 – 17:30; James; 15:00 – 16:00; Soft Play^{[G]} 13:45 – 14:30; Rachel Chinouriri; 12:30 – 13:15; The Zutons; 11:15 – 12:00

A. Idles' set featured a guest appearance from Danny Brown; and they released a boat in a stunt designed by Banksy.
B. D-Block Europe's set featured a guest appearance from Aitch.
C. Anne-Marie's set featured a guest appearance from Aitch.
D. Bombay Bicycle Club's set featured a guest appearance from Damon Albarn.
E. Disclosure's set featured a guest appearance from Sam Smith.
F. The National's set featured a guest appearance from This Is the Kit.
E. Soft Play's set featured a guest appearance from Bob Vylan

== 2023 ==
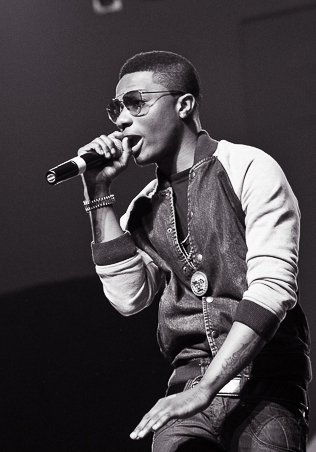
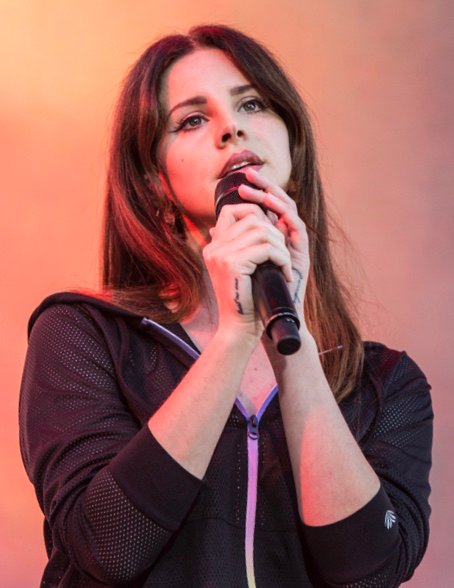
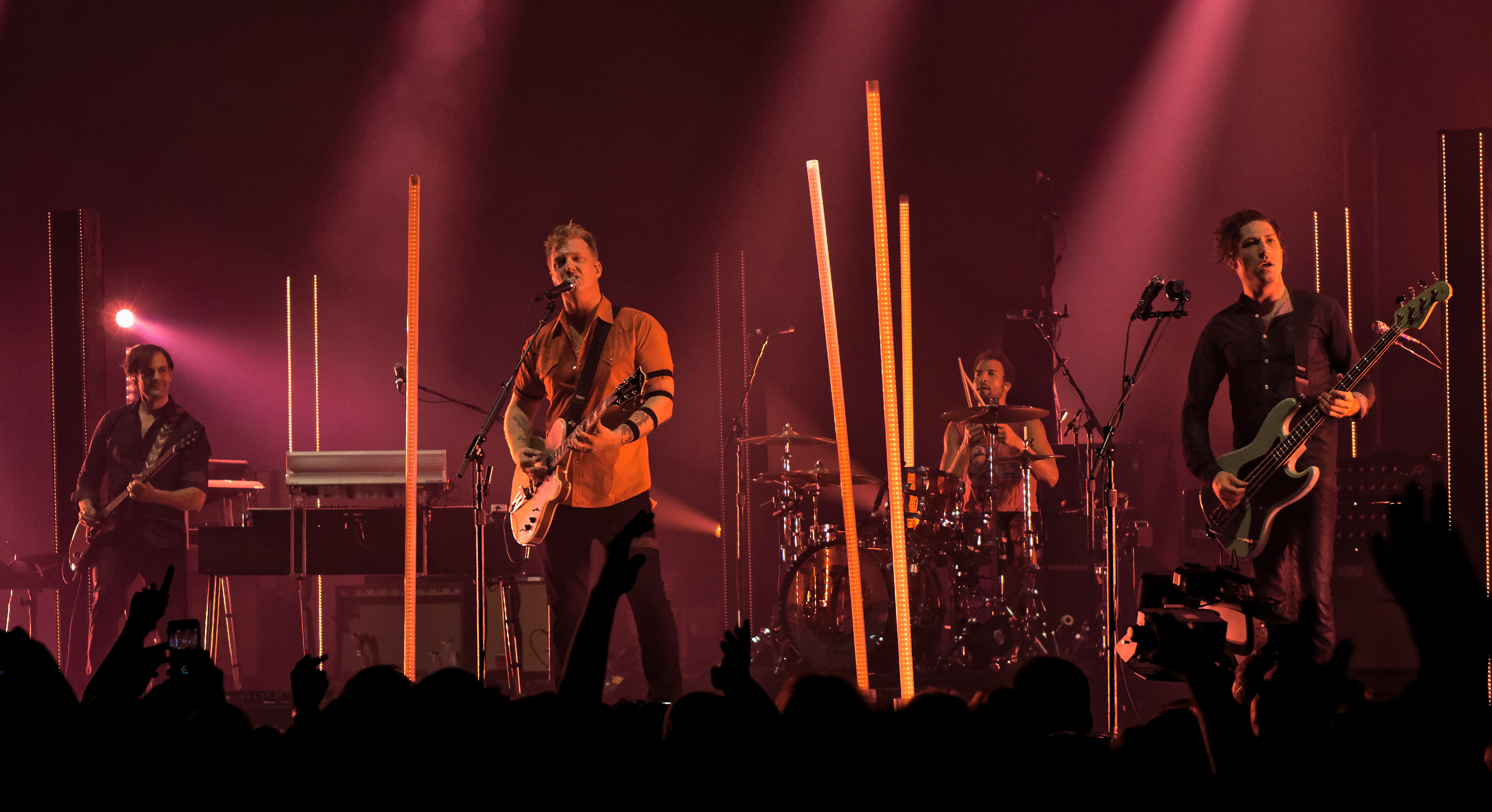
Other Stage headliners Wizkid, Lana Del Rey and Queens of the Stone Age.

Friday	Saturday	Sunday
Wizkid; 22:30 – 23:45; Fred Again; 20:30 – 21:30; Chvrches; 18:45 – 19:45; Krept and Konan; 17:15 – 18:15; Carly Rae Jepsen; 15:45 – 16:45; The Lightning Seeds; 14:15 – 15:15; The Hives; 13:00 – 13:45; Ben Howard; 11:30 – 12:30	Lana Del Rey; 22:30 – 23:30; Central Cee^{[A]} 20:30 – 21:30; Manic Street Preachers; 18:45 – 19:45; Maggie Rogers; 17:15 – 18:15; Generation Sex; 15:45 – 16:45; Tom Grennan; 14:15 – 15:15; The Lathums; 13:00 – 13:45; The Unthanks; 11:45 – 12:30	Queens of the Stone Age; 21:45 – 23:15; The War on Drugs; 19:45 – 20:45; Becky Hill^{[B]} 18:00 – 19:00; Dermot Kennedy; 16:30 – 17:30; The Teskey Brothers; 15:00 – 16:00; Nova Twins; 13:30 – 14:30; Japanese Breakfast; 12:15 – 13:00; The Joy; 11:00 – 11:45

A. Central Cee's set featured an appearance from Dave.
B. Becky Hill's set featured the Heritage Orchestra.

== 2022 ==
Friday	Saturday	Sunday
Foals; 22:30 – 23:45; St. Vincent; 20:30 – 21:30; Idles; 18:45 – 19:45; Supergrass; 17:15 – 18:15; First Aid Kit; 15:45 – 16:45; Blossoms^{[A]} 14:15 – 15:15; Kae Tempest; 13:00 – 13:45; The Libertines; 11:30 – 12:30	Megan Thee Stallion; 22:30 – 23:30; Burna Boy; 20:30 – 21:30; Olivia Rodrigo^{[B]} 18:45 – 19:45; Glass Animals; 17:15 – 18:15; Metronomy; 15:45 – 16:45; Skunk Anansie; 14:15 – 15:15; Tems; 13:00 – 13:45; Hak Baker; 11:45 – 12:30	Pet Shop Boys^{[C]} 21:40 – 23:15; Years & Years; 19:45 – 20:45; Kacey Musgraves; 18:00 – 19:00; Fontaines D.C. 16:30 – 17:30; Declan McKenna; 15:00 – 16:00; Lianne La Havas; 13:30 – 14:30; Sea Girls; 12:15 – 13:00; Kojey Radical; 11:00 – 11:45

A. Blossoms' set featured an appearance by Melanie C.
B. Olivia Rodrigo's set featured an appearance by Lily Allen.
C. Pet Shop Boys' set featured an appearance by Olly Alexander.

Other Stage Set Lists
Pet Shop Boys
- 1. Suburbia
- 2. Can You Forgive Her?
- 3. Opportunities (Let's Make Lots of Money)
- 4. Where the Streets Have No Name (I Can't Take My Eyes Off You)
- 5. Rent
- 6. I Don't Know What You Want but I Can't Give It Any More
- 7. So Hard
- 8. Left to My Own Devices
- 9. Domino Dancing
- 10. Love Comes Quickly
- 11. Losing My Mind
- 12. Always on My Mind
- 13. Dreamland with Olly Alexander
- 14. Heart
- 15. It's Alright
- 16. Vocal
- 17. Go West
- 18. It's a Sin
- 19. West End Girls
- 20. Being Boring

== 2019 ==
Friday	Saturday	Sunday
Tame Impala; 22:15 - 23:45; Two Door Cinema Club; 20:15 - 21:15; The Charlatans; 18:30 - 19:30; The Lumineers; 17:00 - 18:00; Mac DeMarco; 15:30 - 16:30; The Wombats; 14:00 - 15:00; MØ; 12:30 - 13:30; The Vaccines; 11:00 - 12:00	The Chemical Brothers; 22:15 - 23:45; The Courteeners; 20:45 - 21:30; Sigrid; 19:00 - 20:00; Johnny Marr; 17:30 - 18:30; Lewis Capaldi; 16:00 - 17:00; Maggie Rogers; 14:30 - 15:30; Fantastic Negrito; 13:00 - 14:00; The Cat Empire; 11:30 - 12:30	Christine and the Queens; 22:00 - 23:15; Dave; 20:15 - 21:15; Billie Eilish; 18:45 - 19:45; Loyle Carner; 17:15 - 18:15; Bring Me the Horizon; 15:45 - 16:45; Babymetal; 14:35 - 15:15; Slaves; 13:00 - 14:00; Circa Waves; 11:50 - 12:30; SK Shlomo; 11:00 - 11:25

== 2017 ==
Other Stage
Friday	Saturday	Sunday
Major Lazer; 22:30 - 23:45; Lorde; 20:45 - 21:45; George Ezra; 19:05 - 20:05; Halsey; 17:40 - 18:35; Glass Animals; 16:20 - 17:10; Circa Waves; 15:00 - 15:50; Nothing but Thieves; 13:40 - 14:30; Charli XCX; 12:25 - 13:15; The Pretenders; 11:00 - 12:00	Alt-J; 22:30 - 23:45; Stormzy; 20:30 - 21:30; Wiley; 19:15 - 20:00; Liam Gallagher; 17:45 - 18:45; Kaiser Chiefs; 16:15 - 17:15; Wild Beasts; 14:45 - 15:45; British Sea Power; 13:15 - 14:15; Whitney; 12:05 - 12:50; Gabrielle Aplin; 11:00 - 11:45	Boy Better Know; 22:15 - 23:15; Emeli Sandé; 20:35 - 21:25; Courteeners; 18:55 - 19:55; Haim; 17:35 - 18:25; Kodaline; 16:15 - 17:05; Rag'n'Bone Man; 14:55 - 15:45; Dropkick Murphys; 13:35 - 14:25; Deaf Havana; 12:15 - 13:05; Slaves; 11:00 - 11:45

== 2016 ==
Other Stage
Friday	Saturday	Sunday
Disclosure; 22:35 - 23:50; Bastille; 20:45 - 21:45; Bring Me the Horizon; 19:20 - 20:15; Editors; 17:55 - 18:50; The Lumineers; 16:30 - 17:25; Frightened Rabbit; 15:15 - 16:00; Christine and the Queens; 14:10 - 14:55; Blossoms; 13:05 - 13:50; James; 11:50 - 12:45	New Order; 22:30 - 23:45; Chvrches; 20:45 - 21:45; The 1975; 19:15 - 20:15; Tom Odell; 17:45 - 18:45; Band of Skulls; 16:15 - 17:15; Hurts; 14:45 - 15:45; St. Paul and The Broken Bones; 13:15 - 14:15; Shura; 12:00 - 12:45; Hælos; 11:00 - 11:40	LCD Soundsystem; 21:45 - 23:15; PJ Harvey; 19:50 - 21:00; Catfish and the Bottlemen; 18:20 - 19:20; Years & Years; 16:50 - 17:50; Jamie Lawson; 15:30 - 16:20; Paul Heaton + Jacqui Abbott; 14:20 - 15:10; Bear's Den; 13:20 - 14:00; Newton Faulkner; 12:20 - 13:00; Anteros; 11:30 - 12:00

== 2015 ==
Friday	Saturday	Sunday
Rudimental; 22:30-23:45; Mark Ronson; 21:00-22:00; The Courteeners; 19:30-20:30; The Vaccines; 18:00-19:00; Jungle; 16:30-17:30; Catfish and the Bottlemen; 15:00-16:00; Everything Everything; 13:50-14:30; The Cribs; 12:30-13:20; The Charlatans; 11:00-12:00	Deadmau5; 22:30-23:45; Ben Howard; 20:40-21:55; The Maccabees; 19:05-20:05; Clean Bandit; 17:35-18:35; Ella Eyre; 16:05-17:05; Young Fathers; 14:45-15:45; The Strypes; 13:25-14:15; Frank Turner; 12:00-13:00; Swim Deep; 11:00-11:40	The Chemical Brothers; 21:45-23:15; Jamie T 20:15-21:15; Belle & Sebastian; 18:45-19:45; Future Islands; 17:15-18:45; Twin Atlantic; 15:45-16:45; Palma Violets; 14:15-15:15; Adam Cohen; 13:00-13:50; SOAK; 12:00-12:40; Rival Sons; 11:00-11:40

== 2009 ==
In 2009 The Other stage was headlined by The Prodigy, Bloc Party and Franz Ferdinand.

== 2008 ==
Friday	Saturday	Sunday
Panic! at the Disco; The Enemy; We Are Scientists; Foals; The Hoosiers; Ben Folds; Vampire Weekend; Joe Lean & The Jing Jang Jong; The Rascals; Ida Maria	Massive Attack; Hot Chip; Elbow; Duffy; The Wombats; Neon Neon; Black Kids; One Night Only; Los Campesinos!; Golden Silvers; The Travelling Band	Groove Armada; The Zutons; Pigeon Detectives; Scouting for Girls; Mark Ronson; Jack Peñate; Newton Faulkner; Black Mountain; Hoodoo Gurus; Black Cherry

== 2004 ==
Friday	Saturday	Sunday
Chemical Brothers; Goldfrapp; Franz Ferdinand; Snow Patrol; Badly Drawn Boy (replaced Jet); The Rapture; I Am Kloot; The Stands; Hal (replaced Billy Talent); Kasabian	Basement Jaxx; Damien Rice; Von Bondies; British Sea Power; My Morning Jacket; Keane; Simple Kid; 22-20's; The Duke Spirit; Rilo Kiley; The Subways	Orbital; Black Rebel Motorcycle Club; Belle & Sebastian; Gomez; The Eighties Matchbox B-Line Disaster; The Ordinary Boys; Divine Comedy; The Zutons; Razorlight; The Choir

== 2003 ==
Friday	Saturday	Sunday
Primal Scream; Röyksopp; Idlewild; Electric Six; Cooper Temple Clause; Yo La Tengo; Tom McRae; Athlete; Pete Yorn; Nada Surf; Har Mar Superstar; The Jeevas	Super Furry Animals; The Coral; Love with Arthur Lee; The Libertines; Interpol; The Eighties Matchbox B-Line Disaster; The Thrills; Sparta; Gemma Hayes; 22-20s; Burn; DNA Doll	Doves; Sigur Rós; Dave Gahan; Grandaddy; The Rapture; The Raveonettes; Damien Rice; Sugarcult; My Morning Jacket; Simple Kid; The Gathering; The Rain Band

== 2002 ==
Friday	Saturday	Sunday
Garbage; Spiritualized; Mercury Rev; Queens of the Stone Age; Lostprophets; Idlewild; Cooper Temple Clause; Ed Harcourt; Vex Red; Ikara Colt (swapped with Dropkick Murphys)	Orbital; Beta Band; Less Than Jake; The Vines; Rival Schools; Electric Soft Parade; Haven; The Coral; The Parkinsons; The Shining; Dog	Air; Groove Armada; Belle and Sebastian; Elbow; Black Rebel Motorcycle Club; Hundred Reasons; New Model Army; My Vitriol; The Soundtrack of Our Lives; Dropkick Murphys (swapped with Ikara Colt); Simon Kaye

== 2000 ==
Friday	Saturday	Sunday
Nine Inch Nails; Moby; The The; Idlewild; Bloodhound Gang; Methods of Mayhem; Fu Manchu; A Perfect Circle; Cay; Rico	Leftfield; Death in Vegas; Elastica; Feeder; Wannadies; David Gray; Coldplay; Toploader; Soulwax; Clinic; Crashland	Basement Jaxx; Beta Band; Muse; The Dandy Warhols; St Etienne; Dark Star; Badly Drawn Boy (replaced The For Carnation); Jack Lukeman; Wilt; The Blue Aeroplanes; Mo Solid Gold

== 1999 ==
Friday	Saturday	Sunday
Kula Shaker; Gomez; Pavement; Wilco; dEUS; Gay Dad; Heather Nova; Queens of the Stone Age; Everlast; Moke; Doves	Paul Oakenfold; Cast; Super Furry Animals; The Cardigans; Travis; The Creatures; Hurricane #1; Straw; Mishka; Fungus; Witness	Mogwai; Mercury Rev; Tindersticks; Feeder; The Delgados; Dogstar; Electrasy; Snowpony; Dr Didg; Toploader; Glastonbury Town Band

== 1998 ==
Friday	Saturday	Sunday
Embrace; Catatonia; Asian Dub Foundation (replaced Wyclef Jean); The Warm Jets; Ultrasound; Rocket from the Crypt; Matchbox 20; Rialto; The Supernaturals; The Montrose Avenue; The Young Offenders; Carrie; Medal; The Soundtrack of Our Lives	Underworld; Placebo; Deftones; Ben Folds Five; St Etienne; Monaco; Marion; Headswim; Kenickie; Catherine Wheel; A; Amanpondo	The Mescaleros feat. Joe Strummer & Bez DJ set; Spiritualized; Bernard Butler; Bentley Rhythm Ace; Audioweb; Alabama 3; The Mighty Mighty Bosstones; Feeder; Dust Junkys; Santa Cruz; Family of Free Love; Senser

== 1997 ==
Friday	Saturday	Sunday
Reef; Ash; The Seahorses; Placebo; Stage started late due to extreme weather conditions; Shirehorses	Kula Shaker; The Chemical Brothers; Neneh Cherry; Dubstar; Stereolab; G Love & Special Sauce; Geneva; 60 Ft. Dolls; Dub War; Silver Sun; The Dharmas; Jonathan Fire*Eater; Scarfo; The Dolmen	The Bluetones; Mansun (who did not manage to sing a single song through, due to ongoing failures with the sound systems, and a sinking stage. They ran out of time and had to leave to allow the next band to set up); Echobelly; Live; Pavement; Super Furry Animals; Symposium; Three Colours Red; The Supernaturals; Gorky's Zygotic Mynci; Travis; Stereophonics; Perfume

== 1985 ==
Friday	Saturday	Sunday
Black Roots; Somo Somo; El Sondro De Londres; Eduardo and Antonio; Son of Kolo; The Blue Aeroplanes; Jonathan Richman & The Modern Lovers; Solstice	Asaah Papa and Graffi Jazz; The Ariwa Posse; Poison Girls; Toxic Shock; Green on Red; Steve Payne & Guests; Eduardo and Antonio; The Happy End; OVA	Chevalier Brothers; Misty in Roots; Doctor and The Medics; Hank Wangford; The Men They Couldn't Hang; James; Microdisney; The Jazz Butcher; Doctor's Children; Rodney Allen
