= Maya Jane Coles =

British musician (born 1988)

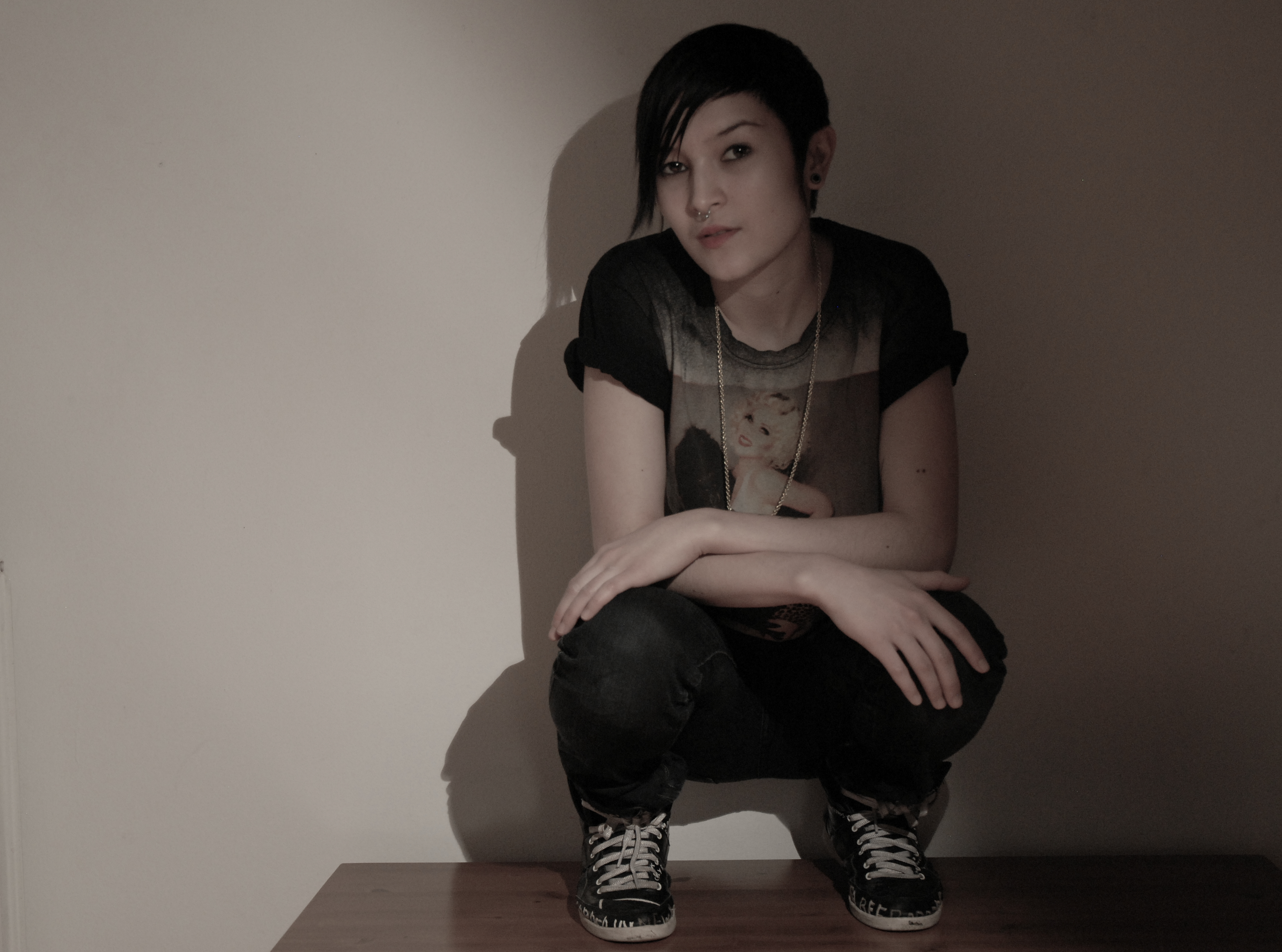
- Coles in 2012

Background information
- Also known as: Nocturnal Sunshine, CAYAM
- Born: 1988 (age 37–38); London, England
- Genres: Deep house, tech house, trip hop, dubstep
- Occupations: Producer, audio engineer, DJ
- Years active: 2006–present
- Labels: Dogmatik, 1trax, Real Tone, Hypercolour, Mobilee, I/Am/Me, 20:20 Vision, Kobalt
- Member of: MAJ!C
- Formerly of: She Is Danger
- Website: MayaJaneColes.com

Maya Jane Coles (born 1988) is a British music producer, audio engineer and DJ, born in London. Under her real name, she mostly composes and plays house and techno music, while her alias Nocturnal Sunshine creates darker, more bass-driven productions with a heavy hip-hop and dub influence. She was previously part of an electronic dub duo called She Is Danger with Lena Cullen.

== Biography ==
=== Debut ===
Coles began making music as a teenager, learning to produce music using the Cubase software program when she was 15. She first produced hip-hop and trip hop. A few years later, she released her first two records on Dogmatik Records, in 2008 and 2009, which were more house music-based.

=== Career ===
Having already remixed acts such as Massive Attack and Gorillaz with her duo She Is Danger, Coles gained breakthrough exposure in 2010, when she released a four-track EP on Franck Roger's label, Real Tone Records. She was then named by DJ Mag as one of the best newcomers that year, as her track "What They Say", taken from her eponymous EP, was also one of the most playlisted by DJs on Resident Advisor.

In 2011, she featured in many specialised magazines, such as Mixmag. BBC Radio 1 invited her to record an Essential Mix of her own, which was later nominated for Essential Mix of the Year 2011. Later on that year, she was voted 'Best Newcomer 2011' at the Ibiza DJ Awards 2011 and came ninth place in Resident Advisor's annual DJ ranking.

In 2012, she won 'Best House/Garage/Deep House' track at the Miami Winter Music Conference 2012, 'Staff Pick: Artist of the year 2011' at the Beatport Awards, DJ Mag's 'Producer of the Year 2011', Mixmag's 'Best Breakthrough DJ 2011', FACT's 'Female Artist 2011', and Symphonic Distribution's 'Artist of the Year 2012'

Later in the year, Coles was invited to record a mix for the DJ Kicks collection. The volume she produced was released in April, and obtained a favourable reception from specialised media. In November, Rolling Stone placed Coles at number 15 on its list of the world's 25 most influential DJs.

Maya was later invited back to record a second BBC Radio 1 Essential Mix in 2013.

Coles' début album Comfort was on her own I/AM/ME label and Kobalt Label Services internationally in summer 2013. It featured guest appearances from artists such as Tricky, Miss Kittin, Nadine Shah, Alpines, Thomas Knights and Karin Park.

She also produced Fabric 75 (released April 2014), the 75th edition of London nightclub Fabric's monthly compilation album.

In late 2014, the title track of Coles' 2010 EP What They Say was sampled in the Nicki Minaj song "Truffle Butter", a collaborative track with Drake and Lil Wayne from her album The Pinkprint.

In 2017, Coles released her second album, Take Flight, on her own label, I/AM/ME. The 24-track album peaked at number 37 in the overall UK albums chart during the week of release, number 26 in the Independent label chart and number 15 in the Billboard Dance and Electronic Album Sales Chart. The album received immense support, receiving a 72% score on Metacritic, gaining coverage from a number of high tier publications including Mixmag, Pitchfork and Billboard, as well as receiving DSP support such as a banner on the iTunes Electronic page, a spot in Spotify New Releases, Apple Music New Releases and was named Beatport Artist of the Week. Maya gained 2 'Essential New Tunes' from Pete Tong on BBC Radio 1 for two of her singles from the album, "Cherry Bomb" and "Trails" and to top of her year, she won Best Album and Best Producer at the DJ Mag Best of British Awards 2017 off the back of her Take Flight album.

2017 also saw Maya gain a number of selected mix placements such as her Essential Mix, which was shortlisted for Essential Mix of the Year, Annie Mac's Mini Mix, Channel 4 Best Before, Beats1 Mix as well as Radio 1 Live in Ibiza. Going into 2018 she also secured a British Airways exclusive mix with her full album also added in flight.

In May 2020, the title track of Coles' 2010 EP What They Say was sampled in the Lady Gaga song "Sour Candy", a collaborative track with Blackpink from her album Chromatica.

In 2021, she co-produced one of the songs, "Loving You" on Sting's album, The Bridge.

In 2025, she formed the electronic music supergroup MAJ!C with fellow DJs Alex Jones, Jammer and Chloe Robinson, with their first shows including Glastonbury Festival and fabric.

== Discography ==
=== As Maya Jane Coles ===
==== Studio albums ====
- 2013: Comfort
- 2017: Take Flight
- 2021: Night Creature

==== Compilation albums ====
Professional ratings
Review scores
Source	Rating
Mixmag	4/5 stars
Resident Advisor	4/5 stars
Spin	8/10 stars

DJ-Kicks: Maya Jane Coles
No.	Title	Length
1.	"Deft – Loqux & Past"
2.	"Kris Wadsworth – Mainline (Jimmy Edgar Remix)"
3.	"Chasing Kurt – Money"
4.	"Bozzwell – In My Cocoon"
5.	"Larse – Karoo"
6.	"Milscot feat. Angela Sheik – All Alone (Domyan Just Slow Remix)"
7.	"Adam Stacks – Hey Love"
8.	"Phil Kieran & White Noise Sound – Never Believed"
9.	"Sigward – Nuerd"
10.	"Maya Jane Coles – Not Listening"
11.	"Virgo Four – It’s A Crime (Caribou Remix)"
12.	"Roberto Bardini – Hate Me (Muteoscillator Fairy Tall Remix)"
13.	"Tripmastaz – Guess Who"
14.	"Standard Fair – Little Helper 16-3"
15.	"Nocturnal Sunshine – Meant To Be"
16.	"Zenker Brothers – Berg 10"
17.	"Last Magpie – No More Stories"
18.	"Zoe Zoe – Church"
19.	"Gerry Read – Roomland (Youandewan Remix)"
20.	"T. Williams – Analog Tour"
21.	"Marcel Dettmann – Translation Two"
22.	"Claro Intelecto – Hunter’s Rocket to the Sky"

==== Singles and extended plays ====
Year	Title	Label	Reviews
2008	Sick Panda	Dogmatik Records	
2009	Monochrome EP	Dogmatik Records	
2009	The Dazed EP	1TRAX	
2009	Not in My House EP	1TRAX	
2010	No Sympathy	Elite Records	
2010	Bubbler EP	Loco Records Supreme	
2010	What They Say	Real Tone Records	Resident Advisor
2010	Cool Down EP	Dogmatik Records	
2010	Humming Bird EP	Hypercolour	
2011	Beat Faster	Mobilee	
2011	Focus Now	20:20 Vision	Resident Advisor
2011	The Remixes	Real Tone Records	
2011	Dont Put Me in Your Box EP	Hypercolour	Resident Advisor
2012	Not Listening	K7	
2012	Watcher	Dogmatik	
2012	Getting Freaky	Heidi presents... Jackathon Jams	
2012	Easier To Hide	I/AM/ME	
2013	Comfort	I/Am/Me, Kobalt	
2014	From the Dark	Mobilee Records	
2017	Won't Let You Down EP	I/Am/Me	
2017	Trails	I/Am/Me	
2017	Weak / Werk	I/Am/Me	
2018	Keep Me Warm (featuring Gaps)	I/Am/Me	
2018	Don't Leave	I/Am/Me	
2018	Other Side	I/Am/Me	
2020	Run To You (featuring Claudia Kane)	I/Am/Me	
2020	Would You Kill (4 Me)? EP	I/Am/Me	
2021	Night Creature	I/Am/Me	
2021	True Love to the Grave (featuring Claudia Kane)	I/Am/Me	
2021	Got Me (featuring Julia Stone)	I/Am/Me	

==== Remixes ====
Year	Title	Artist	Label
2008	New System (Maya Jane Coles Remix)	Chris Ibbot	Dogmatik
2008	Fuck Me Pumps (Maya Jane Coles Remix)	Amy Winehouse	Island
2008	Uncle Tech (Maya Jane Coles Remix)	Todd Terry	1TRAX
2009	Romanov's Boogie (Maya Jane Coles Remix)	The Sun Paulo	Wisdom Records
2010	Time To Dance (Maya Jane Coles Remix)	Tricky	Domino
2011	Cicadas (Maya Jane Coles Remix)	Tom Middleton	Lo:Rise
2011	Crash (Maya Jane Coles Remix)	Fritz & Lang feat. Lizokot	Airdrop Records
2011	Your Style (Maya Jane Coles Remix)	Maceo Plex	Crosstown Rebels
2011	O' So (Maya Jane Coles Remix)	Inxec & Mark Chambers	Leftroom Records
2011	Next To You (Maya Jane Coles Remix)	Marvin Zeyss	Brown Eyed Boyz
2011	City Life (Maya Jane Coles Remix)	DJ T	Get Physical
2011	Ritual Union (Maya Jane Coles Remix)	Little Dragon	Peacefrog
2011	Time To Dance (Maya Jane Coles Remix)	Tricky	Domino
2011	Creeping (Maya Jane Coles Remix)	2:54	Fiction
2012	Bring It Back (Maya Jane Coles Remix)	Franck Rodger	Real Tone
2012	Lost and Found (Maya Jane Coles Remix)	Lianne La Havas	Warners
2012	She's on Fire (Maya Jane Coles Remix)	Bo Saris	Bo Rush
2012	Spectrum (Maya Jane Coles Remix)	Florence & The Machine	Island Records
2013	Fiction (Maya Jane Coles Remix)	The xx	Young Turks
2013	So High (Maya Jane Coles Remix)	Big Dope P	Moveltraxx
2013	Free (Maya Jane Coles Remix)	Rudimental feat. Emeli Sandé	Asylum Records
2013	Blue Skies (Maya Jane Coles Remix)	Ella Fitzgerald	Verve Records
2013	First Fires (Maya Jane Coles Remix)	Bonobo feat. Grey Reverend	Ninja Tune
2013	Love Drug (Maya Jane Coles Remix)	Booka Shade feat. Fritz Helder	Blaufield
2014	Pray For Love (Maya Jane Coles Remix)	Kwabs	Atlantic Records
2015	Hurricane (Maya Jane Coles Remix)	Karin Park feat. Pandora Drive	State of the Eye
2015	Lay Me Down (Maya Jane Coles Remix)	Sam Smith	Capitol Records
2017	Going Backwards (Maya Jane Coles Remix)	Depeche Mode	Columbia Records
2019	Movement (Maya Jane Coles Remix)	Hozier	Columbia Records
2019	Cocoon (Maya Jane Coles Remix)	Gold Fields	Haven Sounds
2020	I Wanna Know (Maya Jane Coles Remix)	Jetta	3 Beat Productions
2021	Come Back Around (Maya Jane Coles Remix)	Eli & Fur	Anjunadeep
2023	Live Again ft. Halo Maud (Maya Jane Coles Remix)	The Chemical Brothers	EMI/Virgin
2025	Say Tell Me (Maya Jane Coles Remix)	Tokimonsta	Young Art

=== As Nocturnal Sunshine ===
==== Studio albums ====
2015: Nocturnal Sunshine

- 01. Intro (Holding On)
- 02. Believe feat. Chelou
- 03. It's Alright
- 04. Take Me There
- 05. Drive
- 06. Footsteps
- 07. Down by the River feat. Catnapp
- 08. Bass Bin
- 09. Can't Hide The Way I Feel
- 10. Intergalactic
- 11. Skipper
- 12. Hotel

2019: Full Circle

- 01. Wildfire feat. Catnapp
- 02. Gravity feat. Ry X
- 03. Possessed feat. Peaches
- 04. Pull Up feat. Gangsta Boo & Young M.A
- 05. I'm Ready
- 06. Ridin' Solo feat. Gangsta Boo
- 07. Lessons of Life
- 08. Dash feat. CHA$EY JON£S
- 09. To the Ground
- 10. Fuck Fame feat. CHA$EY JON£S
- 11. U&ME
- 12. Foundation
- 13. Tied Up
- 14. Closed Eyes feat. Thomas Knights
- 15. Something About the Drama feat. Chelou

==== Originals ====
Year	Title	Label	Reviews
2010	Can't Hide the Way I Feel	LMD SkunkWorks	Resident Advisor
2010	Meant To Be	!K7	

==== Remixes ====
Year	Title	Artist	Label
2010	Not Your Teddy Bear (Nocturnal Sunshine Remix)	Backwords	Elastica
2011	Ms Cooper (Nocturnal Sunshine Remix)	Floyd Lavine feat. Mey	Polydor
2011	Cocoon (Nocturnal Sunshine Remix)	Alpines	Polydor
2012	Pixellated People (Nocturnal Sunshine Remix)	Jess Mills	Island
2016	Close Up (Nocturnal Sunshine Remix)	Peaches feat. Kim Gordon	I U She

=== As She Is Danger ===
==== Remixes ====
Year	Title	Artist	Label
2009	Under the Sheets (She Is Danger Remix)	Ellie Goulding	Polydor
2010	Girl I Love You (She Is Danger Remix)	Massive Attack	Virgin Records
2010	Gangster (She Is Danger Remix)	Dreadzone	Dubwiser
2010	On Melancholy Hill (She Is Danger Remix)	Gorillaz	Parlophone
2010	Doubt (She Is Danger Remix)	Delphic	Polydor

== Music videos ==
Year	Title	Director(s)
2014	Comfort	Jonas K Lord
2014	Come Home	Jonas K Lord
2015	Believe	The Fashtons
