= Kitchen Sink (album) =

Studio album by Nadine Shah
- Released: 26 June 2020
- Genre: Post-punk
- Length: 46:51
- Label: Infectious
- Producer: Ben Hillier

Nadine Shah chronology
Holiday Destination (2017)	Kitchen Sink (2020)	Filthy Underneath (2024)

Singles from Kitchen Sink
- 1. "Ladies for Babies (Goats for Love)" Released: 4 February 2020; 2. "Trad" Released: 25 March 2020; 3. "Buckfast" Released: 13 May 2020

Kitchen Sink is the fourth studio album by English musician Nadine Shah. It was released on 26 June 2020 under Infectious Music.

== Singles and release ==
On 4 February 2020, Shah announced the release of her new album – originally scheduled for 5 June – along with the first single "Ladies for Babies (Goats for Love)".

On 25 March 2020, the second single "Trad" was released.

The third release "Buckfast" was released on 13 May 2020, along with the announcement the album had been pushed back to 26 June from its original date of 5 June. Shah said of the single: "'Buckfast' is about a toxic relationship, it's about gaslighting."

== Critical reception ==
Professional ratings
Aggregate scores
Source	Rating
AnyDecentMusic?	8.0/10
Metacritic	86/100
Review scores
Source	Rating
AllMusic	4/5 stars
Beats Per Minute	75%
Clash	8/10
DIY	4/5 stars
Gigwise	7/10
The Line of Best Fit	9/10
Loud and Quiet	7/10
MusicOMH	4/5 stars
NME	4/5 stars
Pitchfork	7.9/10

Kitchen Sink was met with "universal acclaim" reviews from critics. At Metacritic, which assigns a weighted average rating out of 100 to reviews from mainstream publications, this release received a score of 86, based on 15 reviews.

== Track listing ==
All tracks are written by Nadine Shah and Ben Hillier, with additional writers noted.

Kitchen Sink track listing
No.	Title	Writer(s)	Length
1.	"Club Cougar"		4:46
2.	"Ladies for Babies (Goats for Love)"		4:29
3.	"Buckfast"	Neill MacColl; Ben Nicholls	3:51
4.	"Dillydally"	MacColl	3:48
5.	"Trad"	MacColl	5:28
6.	"Kitchen Sink"		3:37
7.	"Kite"		4:53
8.	"Ukrainian Wine"		4:40
9.	"Wasps Nest"		2:23
10.	"Walk"		4:44
11.	"Prayer Mat"	MacColl	4:21
Total length:			46:51

== Personnel ==
- Nadine Shah – lead vocals (all tracks)
- Ben Hillier – guitar (all tracks), drums (tracks 1–3), percussion (1, 2), production (all tracks), engineer (all tracks)
- Ben Nicholls – bass (1–3, 5, 10, 11)
- Neil MacColl – vocals (3)
- Pete Wareham – flute, saxophone (10)
- Dan Crook – engineering (all tracks)
- Maisie Cook – engineering (all tracks)
- Katie Tavini – mastering (all tracks)

== Charts ==
Chart performance for Kitchen Sink
Chart (2020)	Peak position
Scottish Albums (Official Charts)	14
UK Albums (Official Charts)	29
UK Independent Albums (Official Charts)	3
