= Comfort (Maya Jane Coles album) =

Studio album by Maya Jane Coles
- Released: 2 July 2013
- Genre: Deep house, tech house, trip hop
- Length: 51:18
- Label: I/AM/ME
- Producer: Maya Jane Coles

Maya Jane Coles chronology
DJ-Kicks (2012)	Comfort (2013)

Singles from Comfort
- 1. "Easier to Hide" Released: 7 December 2012; 2. "Everything" Released: 12 May 2013

Professional ratings
Aggregate scores
Source	Rating
Metacritic	75/100
Review scores
Source	Rating
XLR8R	7.5/10
The Line of Best Fit	8/10

Comfort is the debut full-length studio album by English DJ Maya Jane Coles. It was released in July 2013 under I/Am/Me Records.

== Track listing ==
No.	Title	Writer(s)	Length
1.	"Comfort"	Maya Jane Coles	4:58
2.	"Easier to Hide"	Maya Jane Coles	5:01
3.	"Burning Bright" (featuring Kim Ann Foxman)	Maya Jane Coles, Kim Ann Foxman	4:35
4.	"Dreamer"	Maya Jane Coles	4:04
5.	"Blame" (featuring Nadine Shah)	Maya Jane Coles, Nadine Shah	4:12
6.	"Stranger"	Maya Jane Coles	3:13
7.	"Everything" (featuring Karin Park)	Maya Jane Coles, Karin Park	4:09
8.	"Fall from Grace" (featuring Catherine Pockson)	Maya Jane Coles, Catherine Pockson	4:58
9.	"Wait for You" (featuring Tricky)	Maya Jane Coles, Adrian Nicholas Thaws	3:52
10.	"When I'm in Love" (featuring Thomas Knights)	Maya Jane Coles, Brian Epstein, Thomas Knights	4:30
11.	"Take a Ride" (featuring Miss Kittin)	Maya Jane Coles, Caroline Herve	4:05
12.	"Come Home"	Maya Jane Coles	3:41
