= Love Your Dum and Mad =

Studio album by Nadine Shah
- Released: 22 July 2013
- Studios: The Pool (London); Panarific (London); Curtain Superstore (Blaydon)
- Length: 49:10
- Label: Apollo
- Producer: Ben Hillier

Nadine Shah chronology
Dreary Town (2013)	Love Your Dum and Mad (2013)	Fast Food (2015)

Singles from Love Your Dum and Mad
- 1. "Dreary Town" Released: 21 May 2013; 2. "To Be a Young Man" Released: 8 July 2013; 3. "Runaway" Released: 16 September 2013; 4. "Aching Bones (Single Edit)" Released: 25 November 2013; 5. "Ville Morose / The Devil" Released: 17 March 2014

Love Your Dum and Mad is the debut studio album by the English singer-songwriter Nadine Shah, produced by Ben Hillier and released on 22 July 2013 through Apollo Records.

== Critical reception ==
Professional ratings
Aggregate scores
Source	Rating
AnyDecentMusic?	7.1/10
Metacritic	75/100
Review scores
Source	Rating
The Arts Desk	3/5 stars
Clash	7/10
Consequence of Sound	C+
DIY	3.5/5 stars
The Line of Best Fit	8.5/10
Loud and Quiet	4/10
MusicOMH	4/5 stars
NME	3.5/5 stars
Pitchfork	7.9/10
The Skinny	4/5 stars

According to the review aggregator Metacritic, Love Your Dum and Mad received "generally favorable reviews" based on a weighted average score of 75 out of 100 from thirteen critic scores. Another aggregator, AnyDecentMusic?, gave it a weighted average score of 7.1 out of 10 from nineteen critic reviews.

== Track listing ==
All tracks are written by Nadine Shah and Ben Hillier.

Love Your Dum and Mad track listing
No.	Title	Length
1.	"Aching Bones"	3:55
2.	"To Be a Young Man"	5:01
3.	"Runaway"	4:53
4.	"The Devil"	4:11
5.	"Floating"	5:22
6.	"All I Want"	4:15
7.	"Used It All"	3:37
8.	"Dreary Town"	4:33
9.	"Remember"	3:56
10.	"Filthy Game"	2:50
11.	"Winter Reigns"	6:47
Total length:		49:10

== Personnel ==
Credits are adapted from the CD liner notes.

=== Musicians ===
- Nadine Shah – vocals (all tracks), piano (1, 3, 4, 7–11), Lorenzo organ (2, 5), treated piano (6)
- Ben Hillier – drums (1–3, 5, 8), guitar (1, 2, 4, 6, 8, 11), backing vocals (2, 3), bass (4, 7, 8, 9), tea trays (4), additional piano (6), vibraphone (8)
- Neill MacColl – guitar (1–3, 5)
- Simon McCabe – samples (1), zither (1), guitar (2, 3), backing vocals (2), guitar effects (5)
- Ben Nicholls – bass (1–3, 5), backing vocals (2)
- Nick Webb – guitar (1–3, 5)
- Geoffrey Mitchell – French horn (7, 9–11)
- Jamie Miller – clarinet (9–11)

=== Technical and design ===
- Ben Hillier – production (all tracks)
- Ferg Peterkin – engineering at The Pool, London (1–3, 5), engineering at Panarific, London (4, 6)
- Matt Wiggins – engineering at Curtain Superstore, Blaydon (7–11), engineering assistance at The Pool, London (1–3, 5)
- Bunt Stafford Clark – mastering at The Pierce Rooms, London (all tracks)
- Matthew Stephens-Scott – painting
- Richard Robinson – design

== Charts ==
Chart performance for Love Your Dum and Mad
Chart (2013)	Peak position
UK Independent Albums (OCC)	23
UK Record Store Chart (OCC)	16
