= Ben Hillier =

British record producer

Ben Hillier is an English songwriter and pop-rock record producer who is part of the creative team 140 dB. He produced the notable albums Playing the Angel, Sounds of the Universe and Delta Machine by Depeche Mode, Think Tank by Blur, Some Cities by Doves and Cast of Thousands by Elbow.

== Discography ==
=== Production ===
- 2026 Graham Coxon – Castle Park album (producer, mixer, recorded in 2011)
- 2024 Juanita Stein – The Weightless Hour album (producer, mixer)
- 2024 Nadine Shah – Filthy Underneath album (co-writer, producer)
- 2023 Storm Franklin (Ben Hillier and Juanita Stein) – Loneliness In The Modern World album (co-writer, producer, mixer)
- 2022 Onyda – Queen of Duality EP (co-writer, producer, mixer)
- 2022 Melt Yourself Down – Pray For Me I Don't Fit In album (producer)
- 2020 Nadine Shah – Kitchen Sink album (co-writer, producer)
- 2020 Melt Yourself Down – 100% Yes album (co-producer)
- 2020 Juanita Stein – Snapshot album (producer)
- 2019 Gang of Four – Happy Now album (producer, 3 songs)
- 2018 Kings of the South Seas – Franklin album (producer)
- 2015 Balthazar – Thin Walls (producer)
- 2015 Nadine Shah – Fast Food album (co-writer, producer)
- 2013 Nadine Shah – Love Your Dum and Mad (Co-Writer & Producer)
- 2013 Depeche Mode – Delta Machine album (Producer)
- 2013 PVT – Homosapien album (Mixer)
- 2012 We Have Band – Turninon (Mixer)
- 2012 Graham Coxon – A+E (Producer & Mixer)
- 2012 Beth Jeans Houghton – Yours Truly, Cellophane Nose (Producer)
- 2010 The Magic Numbers – The Runaway (Mixer)
- 2010 Villagers – Becoming a Jackal (Mixer)
- 2009 The Editors – In This Light and on This Evening album (Mixer)
- 2009 Natalie Imbruglia – Come to Life album (Writer/Producer/Mixer)
- 2009 The Lea Shores – The Lea Shores album (Producer & Mixer)
- 2009 Depeche Mode – Sounds of the Universe album (Producer)
- 2008 The Rascals – Rascalize album (Producer & Mixer)
- 2008 Josephine Oniyama – In the Labyrinth EP (Co-Writer & Producer)
- 2008 Captain – "Keep an Open Mind" single (Producer)
- 2008 The Courteeners – "What Took You So Long?" single (Producer & Mixer)
- 2007 Natalie Imbruglia – Glorious: The Singles 97–07 album tracks (Writer/Producer/Mixer)
- 2007 The Maccabees – Colour It In album (Producer)
- 2007 The Horrors – Strange House album tracks (Producer & Mixer)
- 2007 Seth Lakeman – "Lillywhite Girl" single (Mixer)
- 2007 Charlotte Hatherley – The Deep Blue album (Mixer)
- 2006 The Futureheads – News and Tributes album (Producer & Mixer)
- 2006 Patrick Wolf – "Accident & Emergency" single (Mixer)
- 2006 Magnet – "My Darling Curse" (Mixer)
- 2005 Depeche Mode – Playing the Angel album (Producer & Mixer)
- 2005 Doves – Some Cities album (Producer & Mixer)
- 2005 Kid Carpet – Ideas and Oh Dears album (Mixer)
- 2004 Cathy Davey – Something Ilk album (Producer & Mixer)
- 2003 Elbow – Cast of Thousands album (Producer & Mixer)
- 2003 Blur – Think Tank album (Co-Producer & Mixer)
- 2003 Tom McRae – Just Like Blood album (Producer & Mixer)
- 2003 Clearlake – "I Want to Live in a Dream" single (Mixer)
- 2002 Brendan Benson – "Metarie" from Lapalco album (Mixer)
- 2002 Clinic – Walking with Thee album (Co-Producer & Mixer)
- 2002 Blur and Marianne Faithfull – Kissing Time album (Track Producer & Mixer)
- 2001 Elbow – Asleep in the Back album (Producer & Mixer)
- 2001 Sophie Ellis-Bextor – "Move This Mountain" and "I Believe" LP tracks (Producer & Writer)
- 2001 Echobelly – People Are Expensive album (Producer & Mixer)
- 2000 Idlewild – "Rusty" with Graham Coxon (Remix)
- 2000 Fat Les – "Jerusalem" single (Producer & Mixer)
- 2000 Graham Coxon – The Golden D album (Engineer & Programmer)
- 2000 Blur – "Music Is My Radar" single (Producer & Mixer)
- 1999 Suede – Head Music album (Engineer)
- 1998 Smashing Pumpkins – "Perfect" Perfecto Remix (Engineer & Programmer)
- 1997 U2 – Pop album (Programmer)
- 1993 U2 – "Lemon" Perfecto Remix
