= The 10 Year Limited Edition Anniversary Box Set =

Box set by Blur
- Released: 17 August 1999
- Recorded: 1990–1999
- Genre: Britpop; alternative rock
- Length: 498:53
- Label: Food Records; EMI
- Producer: Stephen Street; Steve Lovell; William Orbit; Blur

Blur chronology
13 (1999)	The 10 Year Limited Edition Anniversary Box Set (1999)	Blur: The Best Of (2000)

Professional ratings
Review scores
Source	Rating
AllMusic	3.5/5 stars
The Encyclopedia of Popular Music	3/5 stars
Pitchfork Media	(8.5/10)

The 10 Year Limited Edition Anniversary Box Set is a box set by the band Blur released in limited quantities on 17 August 1999. It contains 22 CDs with 126 tracks featuring all official UK singles from their debut album, Leisure, to their 1999 album, 13, and the b-sides, with the exception of three of the b-sides featured on the single No Distance Left to Run (this is due to the single being released after the boxset). Fanclub singles, promotional singles, and singles released in other countries are not included.

== Track listing ==
Disc one

1. "She's So High (Edit)" – 3:49
2. "I Know" – 3:31
3. "Down" – 5:56
4. "Sing" – 6:00
5. "I Know (Extended Version)" – 6:29

Disc two

1. "There's No Other Way" – 3:14
2. "Inertia" – 3:51
3. "Mr Briggs" – 3:59
4. "I'm All Over" – 2:00
5. "There's No Other Way (The Blur Remix)" – 5:04
6. "Won't Do It" – 3:19
7. "Day upon Day (Live)" – 4:01
8. "There's No Other Way (Extended Version)" – 4:04

Disc three

1. "Bang" – 3:34
2. "Explain" – 2:44
3. "Luminous" – 3:13
4. "Berserk" – 6:52
5. "Bang (Extended Version)" – 4:27
6. "Uncle Love" – 2:30

Disc four

1. "Popscene" – 3:12
2. "Mace" – 3:24
3. "Badgeman Brown" – 4:47
4. "I'm Fine" – 3:01
5. "Garden Central" – 5:58

Disc five

1. "For Tomorrow (Single Version)" – 4:20
2. "Into Another" – 3:54
3. "Hanging Over" – 4:27
4. "Peach" – 3:57
5. "Bone Bag" – 4:03
6. "When The Cows Come Home" – 3:49
7. "Beachcoma" – 3:37
8. "For Tomorrow (Acoustic Version)" – 4:41
9. "For Tomorrow (Visit To Primrose Hill Extended)" – 6:00

Disc six

1. "Chemical World (Single Edit)" – 3:54
2. "Young & Lovely" – 5:04
3. "Es Schmecht" – 3:38
4. "My Ark" – 5:58
5. "Maggie May" – 4:05
6. "Chemical World (Reworked)" – 3:46
7. "Never Clever (Live)" – 2:28
8. "Pressure on Julian (Live)" – 5:00
9. "Come Together (Live)" – 3:30

Disc seven

1. "Sunday Sunday" – 2:37
2. "Dizzy" – 3:24
3. "Fried" – 2:34
4. "Shimmer" – 4:40
5. "Long Legged" – 2:23
6. "Mixed Up" – 3:01
7. "Tell Me Tell Me" – 3:37
8. "Daisy Bell (A Bicycle Made For Two)" – 2:48
9. "Let's All Go Down The Strand" – 3:42

Disc eight

1. "Girls & Boys (Edit)" – 4:20
2. "Magpie" – 4:15
3. "Anniversary Waltz" – 1:23
4. "People in Europe" – 3:28
5. "Peter Panic" – 4:22

Disc nine

1. "To the End (Edit)" – 3:52
2. "Girls & Boys" (Pet Shop Boys 7" Mix)" – 4:04
3. "Girls & Boys" (Pet Shop Boys 12" Mix)" – 7:16
4. "Threadneedle Street" – 3:19
5. "Got Yer!" – 1:48

Disc ten

1. "Parklife feat. Phil Daniels" – 3:06
2. "Beard" – 1:46
3. "To The End (French Version)" – 4:06
4. "Supa Shoppa" – 3:02
5. "Theme From An Imaginary Film" – 3:35

Disc eleven

1. "End of a Century" – 2:47
2. "Rednecks" – 3:04
3. "Alex's Song" – 2:42

Disc twelve

1. "Country House" – 3:58
2. "One Born Every Minute" – 2:18
3. "To The End (La Comedie) feat. Françoise Hardy" – 5:06
4. "Country House (Live)" – 5:01
5. "Girls & Boys (Live)" – 5:08
6. "Parklife (Live)" – 4:13
7. "For Tomorrow (Live)" – 7:35

Disc thirteen

1. "The Universal" – 4:00
2. "Ultranol" – 2:42
3. "No Monsters in Me" – 3:38
4. "Entertain Me (The Live It! Remix)" – 7:19
5. "The Universal (Live at the BBC)" – 4:11
6. "Mr Robinson's Quango (Live at the BBC)" – 4:17
7. "It Could Be You (Live at the BBC)" – 3:17
8. "Stereotypes (Live at the BBC)" – 3:12

Disc fourteen

1. "Stereotypes" – 3:11
2. "The Man Who Left Himself" – 3:21
3. "Tame" – 4:47
4. "Ludwig" – 2:24

Disc fifteen

1. "Charmless Man" – 3:33
2. "The Horrors" – 3:18
3. "A Song" – 1:44
4. "St. Louis" – 3:12

Disc sixteen

1. "Beetlebum" – 5:05
2. "All Your Life" – 4:11
3. "A Spell For Money" – 3:31
4. "Beetlebum (Mario Caldato Jr. Mix)" – 5:04
5. "Woodpigeon Song" – 1:41
6. "Dancehall" – 3:11

Disc seventeen

1. "Song 2" – 2:02
2. "Bustin' + Dronin'" – 6:13
3. "Country Sad Ballad Man (Live Acoustic Version)" – 4:59
4. "Get Out of Cities" – 4:02
5. "Polished Stone" – 2:42

Disc eighteen

1. "On Your Own" – 4:27
2. "Chinese Bombs (Live at Peel Acres)" – 1:14
3. "Movin' On (Live at Peel Acres)" – 3:20
4. "M.O.R. (Live at Peel Acres)" – 2:59
5. "Popscene (Live at Peel Acres)" – 3:04
6. "Song 2 (Live at Peel Acres)" – 1:50
7. "On Your Own" (Live at Peel Acres)" – 4:46

Disc nineteen

1. "M.O.R. (Road Version)" – 3:14
2. "Swallows in the Heatwave" – 2:33
3. "Movin' On (William Orbit Remix)" – 8:00
4. "Beetlebum (Moby's Minimal House Mix)" – 6:16

Disc twenty

1. "Tender" – 7:41
2. "All We Want" – 4:33
3. "Mellow Jam" – 3:55
4. "French Song" – 8:19
5. "Song 2" [Same as single version] – 2:02

Disc twenty one

1. "Coffee & TV (Radio Edit)" – 5:19
2. "Trade Stylee (Alex's Bugman Remix)" – 5:59
3. "Metal Hip Slop (Graham's Bugman Remix)" – 4:27
4. "X"-Offender (Damon/Control Freak's Bugman Remix)" – 5:42
5. "Coyote (Dave's Bugman Remix)" – 3:48

Disc twenty two

1. "No Distance Left to Run" – 3:28
2. "Tender (Cornelius Remix)" – 5:23
