= Strange Cargo =

Strange Cargo may refer to:

- Strange Cargo (1929 film)
- Strange Cargo (1936 film)
- Strange Cargo (1940 film), starring Clark Gable and Joan Crawford
- Strange Cargo (William Orbit album)
  - Strange Cargo II, follow-up album by William Orbit
  - Strange Cargo III, follow-up album by William Orbit
  - Strange Cargo Hinterland, follow-up album by William Orbit
- Strange Cargo (David Van Tieghem album)
- Strange Cargo (aircraft), a B-29 Superfortress modified to carry the atomic bomb in World War II.
- Strange Cargo, a novel by Jeffrey E. Barlough
