= Blur: The Best Of =

Greatest hits album by Blur
- Released: 30 October 2000
- Recorded: 1990–2000
- Length: 77:08 (album); 89:35 (VHS/DVD)
- Labels: Food; Virgin; Parlophone
- Producers: Stephen Street; William Orbit; Steve Lovell; Steve Power; Ben Hillier

Blur chronology
The 10 Year Limited Edition Anniversary Box Set (1999)	Blur: The Best Of (2000)	Think Tank (2003)

Damon Albarn chronology
Ordinary Decent Criminal (2000)	Blur: The Best Of (2000)	Gorillaz (2001)

Singles from Blur: The Best Of
- 1. "Music Is My Radar" Released: 16 October 2000

Professional ratings
Aggregate scores
Source	Rating
Metacritic	88/100
Review scores
Source	Rating
AllMusic	4.5/5 stars
Drowned in Sound	6/10
Encyclopedia of Popular Music	5/5 stars
Entertainment Weekly	A−
NME	9/10
Pitchfork	8.6/10
Q	4/5 stars
Robert Christgau	A−
The Rolling Stone Album Guide	4.5/5 stars
Wall of Sound	86/100

Blur: The Best Of is a greatest hits album by the English band Blur, released on 30 October 2000 by Food Records. It was released on CD, cassette tape, MiniDisc, double 12" vinyl record, DVD and VHS. The CD includes 17 of Blur's 23 singles from 1990 to 2000, plus the non-single "This Is a Low" and a new recording, "Music Is My Radar". A special edition of the CD version included a live CD. The DVD/VHS version contains the videos of Blur's first 22 singles. In 2000 the album, which has had enduring sales, hit number 3 in the band's native UK, and hit the US charts at number 186. The cover is by artist Julian Opie. The painting on the cover can be found at the National Portrait Gallery in London, England.

The album received a positive critical response. Of the reviews collected from notable publications by popular review aggregator website Metacritic, the album holds an overall approval rating of 88%.

It has been certified five-times platinum in the UK, making it Blur's best-selling album in the UK.

== Track listing ==
All tracks written by Damon Albarn, Graham Coxon, Alex James, and Dave Rowntree.

Disc 1
No.	Title	Original album	Length
1.	"Beetlebum"	Blur (1997)	5:05
2.	"Song 2"	Blur (1997)	2:02
3.	"There's No Other Way" (edited version)	Leisure (1991)	3:14
4.	"The Universal"	The Great Escape (1995)	4:00
5.	"Coffee & TV" (single edit)	13 (1999)	5:18
6.	"Parklife"	Parklife (1994)	3:07
7.	"End of a Century"	Parklife (1994)	2:47
8.	"No Distance Left to Run"	13 (1999)	3:26
9.	"Tender"	13 (1999)	7:41
10.	"Girls & Boys" (single edit)	Parklife (1994)	4:18
11.	"Charmless Man"	The Great Escape (1995)	3:33
12.	"She's So High" (edited version)	Leisure (1991)	3:49
13.	"Country House"	The Great Escape (1995)	3:57
14.	"To the End" (edited version)	Parklife (1994)	3:51
15.	"On Your Own"	Blur (1997)	4:27
16.	"This Is a Low" (edited version; not released as a single)	Parklife (1994)	5:02
17.	"For Tomorrow" (Visit to Primrose Hill extended version)	Modern Life Is Rubbish (1993)	6:02
18.	"Music Is My Radar"	new recording	5:29
Total length:			77:08

=== VHS/DVD ===
1. "She's So High"
2. "There's No Other Way"
3. "Bang"
4. "Popscene"
5. "For Tomorrow"
6. "Chemical World"
7. "Sunday Sunday"
8. "Girls & Boys"
9. "Parklife"
10. "To the End"
11. "End of a Century"
12. "Country House"
13. "The Universal"
14. "Stereotypes"
15. "Charmless Man"
16. "Beetlebum"
17. "Song 2"
18. "On Your Own"
19. "M.O.R."
20. "Tender"
21. "Coffee & TV"
22. "No Distance Left to Run"

== Personnel ==
Blur

- Damon Albarn – lead vocals, keyboards, synthesizers, organs, acoustic guitar, backing vocals on "Coffee and TV" and "Tender", xylophone on "To the End"
- Graham Coxon – electric and acoustic guitars, backing vocals, lead vocals on "Coffee and TV" and parts of "Tender", saxophone on "Parklife" and "Country House", clarinet on "End of a Century" and "To the End", drums on "Song 2"
- Alex James – bass guitar, backing vocals
- Dave Rowntree – drums, percussion, backing vocals, drum machine on "Girls & Boys" and "On Your Own"

Additional personnel

- Blur – production
- Jack Clark – mixing
- Al Clay – mixing
- Jason Cox – engineering
- Tom Girling – assistant producer
- Stephen Hague – producer, engineer
- Ben Hillier – producer, mixing
- Jeff Knowler – assistant engineer
- Damian LeGassick – programming
- Steve Lovell – producer
- Gerard Navarro – assistant engineer
- William Orbit – producer, engineer
- Jeremy Plumb – art direction, design
- Steve Power – producer
- Iain Roberton – assistant engineer
- Andy Ross – engineer
- John Smith – producer, engineer
- Sean Spuehler – programming
- Stephen Street – producer, engineer
- Greg Williams – photography

== Charts and certifications ==
=== Weekly charts ===
Chart (2000)	Peak position
Australian Albums Chart	23
Austrian Albums Chart	25
Belgian Albums Chart (Flanders)	29
Canadian Albums Chart	14
Danish Albums Chart	29
European Albums Chart	9
French Albums Chart	8
German Albums Chart	35
Irish Albums Chart	3
Japanese Albums Chart	20
New Zealand Albums Chart	6
Norwegian Albums Chart	13
Swedish Albums Chart	22
Swiss Albums Chart	31
UK Albums Chart	3
US Billboard 200	186

=== Certifications ===
Region	Certification	Certified units/sales
Australia (ARIA)	Gold	35,000^{^}
New Zealand (RMNZ)	Gold	7,500^{^}
United Kingdom (BPI)	5× Platinum	1,500,000^{‡}
Summaries
Europe (IFPI)	Platinum	1,000,000^{*}
^{*} Sales figures based on certification alone.^{^} Shipments figures based on certification alone.^{‡} Sales+streaming figures based on certification alone.
