= I.R.S. No Speak =

I.R.S. No Speak was an instrumental-only imprint of the I.R.S. Records record label, founded by Miles Copeland III in January 1988. Inspired by the success of Peter Baumann's Private Music, Windham Hill Records and Capitol Records Cinema Records, Copeland wanted to feature some of the many excellent rock musicians who had been left unemployed by the 1980s disco and punk takeover of the music industry. He also wanted to take a poke at new-age music, stating in the introductory brochure, "It should be apparent that what No Speak isn't is New Age. No Speak eats New Age for breakfast." Though musically successful the label was not financially viable, and folded after only three years and 19 releases.

== No Speak Catalog ==
No.	Artist	Title	Date	Notes
001	Pete Haycock	Guitar & Son	1988	guitarist for Climax Blues Band, whom Copeland managed
002	Wishbone Ash	Nouveau Calls	1988	band reunited to record this album for their former manager, Copeland
003	Stewart Copeland	The Equalizer & Other Cliff Hangers	1988	brother of Miles and the drummer for The Police
004	William Orbit	Strange Cargo	1988	producer and electronic keyboardist
005	Billy Currie	Transportation	1988	keyboardist with Ultravox
006	Steve Hunter	The Deacon	1988	guitarist for Lou Reed
007	Jimmy Z	Anytime... Anyplace!	1988	Jimmy Zavala, saxophonist for Rod Stewart
008	various artists	Guitar Speak	1988	sampler with commissioned pieces from Alvin Lee, Randy California, Eric Johnson, Leslie West, Ronnie Montrose, Steve Howe, Phil Manzanera, Rick Derringer, Pete Haycock, Steve Hunter, Hank Marvin & Robby Krieger
009	Robby Krieger	No Habla	1989	Guitarist for The Doors
010	various artists	Guitar Speak II	1990	sampler with commissioned pieces from Tony Iommi, Jan Akkerman, James Mankey, Dennis Greaves, Hank Marvin, Robin Trower, Frank Marino, Harvey Mandel, Jean-Paul Bourelly & Bernie Marsden
011	Jan Akkerman	The Noise of Art	1990	guitarist for Focus
012	William Orbit	Strange Cargo 2	1990	
013	Darryl Way	Under The Soft	1991	violinist for Curved Air, Darryl Way's Wolf
014	Ronnie Montrose	Mutatis Mutandis	1991	guitarist for Montrose, others
015	various artists	Guitar Speak III	1991	sampler with commissioned pieces from Nils Lofgren, Steve Hackett, Tom Verlaine, Bob Mould, Adrian Belew, Gary Myrick, Mick Taylor, Dominic Miller, Robert Fripp & Steve Morse
MILES	various artists	Instrumental Hits for the '90s	1988	sampler of 17 songs from the No Speak catalog (promo only)
IRSD-NSPROMO (39099)	various artists	Music Too Good For Words / Instrumental Rock for the 90s	1988	sampler of 8 songs from the No Speak catalog, 4 songs Forte and 4 songs Pianissimo—2 songs each from the first 4 No Speak releases
39112	various artists	Music Too Good For Words, Two	1988	sampler of 12 songs from the No Speak catalog
13024	various artists	Night of the Guitar - Live!	1989	highlights of a 26 November 1988 concert featuring Steve Howe, Leslie West, Robby Krieger, Randy California, Steve Hunter, Pete Haycock, Andy Powell, Ted Turner & Alvin Lee—LP and CD differ slightly in contents
