= The Best of Strange Cargos =

Compilation album by William Orbit
- Released: 20 February 1996
- Recorded: 1987–1993
- Genre: Electronic, ambient
- Length: 72:22
- Label: I.R.S. Records
- Producer: William Orbit

William Orbit chronology
Strange Cargo Hinterland (1995)	The Best of Strange Cargos (1996)	Pieces in a Modern Style (2000)

Professional ratings
Review scores
Source	Rating
Allmusic	4.5/5 stars

The Best of Strange Cargos is a compilation album by electronic instrumentalist William Orbit. In it, selected tracks from the first three of Orbit's four-album Strange Cargo series are included. All recordings in the compilation — including a 1993 remix of 1992's "Water From A Vine Leaf" — preceded the 1995 album release of Strange Cargo Hinterland. Three other tracks are also remixes, versions which were not released on initial Strange Cargo series albums.

== Track listing ==
All music and lyrics by William Orbit.

No.	Title	Length
1.	"Water From A Vine Leaf" (with Beth Orton)	7:00
2.	"Dark Eyed Kid"	5:24
3.	"Gringatcho Demento" (with Cleo Torres)	6:34
4.	"Fire And Mercy"	5:12
5.	"Via Caliénte"	2:37
6.	"Time To Get Wize" (with Divine Bashim)	4:07
7.	"Ruby Heart (transmogrified)"	4:40
8.	"Atom Dream"	4:02
9.	"Harry Flowers"	4:32
10.	"Love My Way"	2:36
11.	"Riding to Rio"	3:03
12.	"The Story Of Light" (with Christine Leach)	6:14
13.	"Silent Signals (revisited)"	2:25
14.	"Painted Rock"	3:20
15.	"Water From A Vine Leaf (Underworld remix)"	7:00
16.	"Water Babies"	3:25
Total length:		72:22
