= Wish Thing =

Studio album by Torch Song
- Released: 1984
- Genres: New wave, synthpop, dance-pop
- Length: 40:04
- Label: I.R.S.
- Producer: Torch Song

Torch Song chronology
| Wish Thing (1984) | Ecstasy (1986) |

Wish Thing is Torch Song's first album, released in 1984. At the time, Torch Song consisted of William Orbit, Laurie Mayer (lead vocals), and Grant Gilbert.

The track "Prepare to Energize" was a surprise dance-floor hit, as well as appearing in the 1984 Tom Hanks movie Bachelor Party.

== Critical reception ==
Trouser Press called the album "an ethereal set of instrumentally subtle synth-dance tracks, given most of their character by Laurie Mayer’s delicate voice and the gimmicky production." Musician wrote that the album was "an engagingly new twist" to the "synthrock approach."

== Track listing ==
All tracks written by Mayer/Orbit except where indicated.

| No. | Title | Writer(s) | Length |
|---|---|---|---|
| 1. | "Don't Look Now" | | 6:47 |
| 2. | "Telepathy" | | 4:22 |
| 3. | "Ode to Billie Joe" | Bobbie Gentry | 4:17 |
| 4. | "Another Place" | | 4:05 |
| 5. | "Prepare To Energize" | | 5:14 |
| 6. | "Tattered Dress" | | 4:51 |
| 7. | "Sweet Thing" | | 4:51 |
| 8. | "You Said You Were Coming" | | 3:32 |
| 9. | "Water Clock Secrets" | | 2:05 |
| Total length: | | | 40:04 |
