= Hello Waveforms =

Studio album by William Orbit
- Released: 20 February 2006
- Recorded: Guerilla Beach, Canyon & Square; Sarm West; The Leonard Hotel, London
- Genres: Ambient, electronica
- Length: 56:57
- Label: Sanctuary
- Producer: William Orbit

William Orbit chronology
Pieces in a Modern Style (2000)	Hello Waveforms (2006)	My Oracle Lives Uptown (2009)

Professional ratings
Review scores
Source	Rating
About.com	4.5/5 stars
Allmusic	3.5/5 stars
The Guardian	3/5 stars
The Independent	3/5 stars
musicOMH.com	4/5 stars
The Observer	(unfavourable)
Progressive-Sounds	9/10 stars
PopMatters	(unfavourable)
Slant Magazine	2/5 stars
The Times	3/5 stars
Tiny Mix Tapes	4/5 stars

Hello Waveforms is the ninth album by British electronic musician and record producer, William Orbit. It was released in the UK on 20 February 2006. It is a mostly instrumental ambient record, with only four tracks containing vocals: "Spiral", featuring Kenna and the Sugababes, "They Live In The Sky", sung by Annette and Paulette Morris, and "Bubble Universe", which is based on a song previously recorded with Madonna called "Liquid Love", and has vocals by Laurie Mayer. Mayer also collaborates and co-writes other tracks of the record. All tracks are written by Orbit, either alone or in collaboration with Laurie Mayer and Rico Conning. The second track, "Humming Chorus", is from the opera "Madame Butterfly". In the United States, the album reached number ten on the Billboard Top Electronic Albums chart.

== Track listing ==
No.	Title	Writer(s)	Length
1.	"Sea Green"	William Orbit	6:22
2.	"Humming Chorus"	Giacomo Puccini; arr. Orbit	3:38
3.	"Surfin'"	Orbit, Laurie Mayer, Rico Conning	4:43
4.	"You Know Too Much About Flying Saucers"	Orbit, Mayer, Conning	5:00
5.	"Spiral" (feat. Sugababes & Kenna)	Orbit, Sugababes, Kenna, Karen Poole	4:47
6.	"Who Owns The Octopus"	Orbit	5:00
7.	"Bubble Universe"	Orbit, Mayer, Conning	4:02
8.	"Fragamosia"	Orbit	6:32
9.	"Firebrand"	Orbit, Mayer, Conning	6:16
10.	"They Live In The Sky"	Orbit, Annette Morris, Paulette Morris	4:56
11.	"Colours From Nowhere"	Orbit	5:41
Total length:			56:57

== Bonus track ==
G155 is a track from the "Hello Waveforms" recording sessions that was not included on the album. It can be heard on William Orbit's official website and was issued as a promo single on 7" vinyl only.
