= Set the Controls for the Heart of the Bass =

1990 album by Bassomatic

Studio album by Bassomatic
- Released: 1990
- Length: 56:07
- Label: Virgin
- Producer: William Orbit

Bassomatic chronology
| Set the Controls for the Heart of the Bass (1990) | Science and Melody (1991) |

Singles from Set the Controls for the Heart of the Bass
- 1. "In the Realm of the Senses" Released: 1990; 2. "Fascinating Rhythm" Released: 1990; 3. "Ease On By" Released: 1990

Set the Controls for the Heart of the Bass is the debut album by British electronic music band Bassomatic. The album was released in 1990.

== Background ==
The title and title track are derived from the Pink Floyd song "Set the Controls for the Heart of the Sun".

== Track listing ==
| No. | Title | Writer(s) | Length |
|---|---|---|---|
| 1. | "In the Realm of the Senses" | Sharon Musgrave, William Orbit | 4:14 |
| 2. | "Set the Controls for the Heart of the Bass" | Laurie Mayer, Roger Waters, Orbit | 5:25 |
| 3. | "Fascinating Rhythm" | Mayer, Musgrave, Steve Roberts, Orbit | 4:08 |
| 4. | "Rat Cut-a-Bottle" | Orbit | 5:52 |
| 5. | "Love Catalogue" | John Gosling, William Orbit | 2:17 |
| 6. | "Zombie Mantra" | Orbit | 5:53 |
| 7. | "Freaky Angel" | Mayer, Musgrave, Orbit | 5:25 |
| 8. | "Wicked Love" | Matthew Vaughan, Orbit | 3:57 |
| 9. | "Ease On By" | Mayer, Musgrave, Orbit | 4:19 |
| 10. | "My Tears Have Gone" | Mayer, Kenton | 4:23 |
| 11. | "In the Realm of the Senses" (Funky Paradise Mix) | Musgrave, Orbit | 5:59 |
| 12. | "Fascinating Rhythm" (Soul Odyssey Mix) | Mayer, Musgrave, Orbit, Roberts | 4:15 |
| Total length: | | | 56:07 |

== Personnel ==
- Dave Chelsea - engineer
- Richard Dight - engineer
- Rik Kenton - clavinet, guitar
- Laurie Mayer - vocals
- MC A-side - rap
- MC Midrange - drums
- McInna One Step - voices
- Sharon Musgrave - vocals
- William Orbit - multi instruments
- Steve Roberts - vocal harmony
- Dean Ross - piano
- Sugar J. - turntables
- Lizzie Tear - voices
- Matthew Vaughan - guitar, organ, Hammond organ, piano, strings
