= Bassomatic =

Early 1990s British band

- Years active: 1990-1991
- Past members: William Orbit; Sindy Finn; MC Inna Onestep; Laurie Mayer; Sharon Musgrave

Bassomatic (sometimes written as Bass-O-Matic) were a British band from London apart from vocalist Sharon Musgrave who was originally from Canada, that recorded house music in the 1990s. A project of William Orbit, the band included vocalist Sharon Musgrave and rapper MC Inna Onestep (Steve Roberts, Ramshackle) among others. For the second album, singer Sindy Finn replaced Sharon Musgrave on vocals. Both albums were produced at Guerilla Studios, founded by William Orbit with Laurie Mayer and Grant Gilbert, and released by Virgin Records.

Their debut album was 1990's Set the Controls for the Heart of the Bass, the title track derived from Pink Floyd's "Set the Controls for the Heart of the Sun". This album was re-released in 1997. A subsequent album, Science and Melody, was released in 1991. Bassomatic's biggest hit single was "Fascinating Rhythm" in 1990, which reached No. 9 in the UK Singles Chart and performed well on the UK Dance Chart.

== Discography ==
=== Albums ===
- Set the Controls for the Heart of the Bass (1990) – UK No. 57
- Science and Melody (1991)

=== Singles ===
Year	Single	Peak positions				Album
Year	Single	UK	IRE	NED	US Dance	Album
1990	"In the Realm of the Senses"	66	—	—	6	Set the Controls for the Heart of the Bass
1990	"Fascinating Rhythm"	9	18	47	4	Set the Controls for the Heart of the Bass
1990	"Ease On By"	61	—	—	—	Set the Controls for the Heart of the Bass
1991	"Funky Love Vibrations"	71	—	—	—	Science and Melody
1991	"Go Getta Nutha Man"	92	—	—	—	Science and Melody
1991	"Science & Melody"	—	—	—	—	Science and Melody
"—" denotes releases that did not chart or were not released.
