= Strange Cargo III =

Studio album by William Orbit
- Released: 1993
- Genres: Electronica, world, downtempo, jazzstep, ambient, trip hop, hip hop, dub
- Length: 63:51
- Label: Virgin
- Producer: William Orbit

William Orbit chronology
Strange Cargo II (1990)	Strange Cargo III (1993)	Strange Cargo Hinterland (1995)

Singles from Strange Cargo III
- 1. "Water from a Vine Leaf" Released: 1993

Professional ratings
Review scores
Source	Rating
Allmusic	3/5 stars

Strange Cargo III is an album by electronic instrumentalist William Orbit. It is the third in a series of four similarly titled albums: Strange Cargo, Strange Cargo II and Strange Cargo Hinterland.

The album was performed, produced and mixed by William Orbit at Guerilla Studios, London. Mark Rutherford and Sugar J co-performed "Deus Ex Machina" with William Orbit, with Rutherford also co-writing the song. Rico Conning contributed flexible bleeps and roadhouse piano on "Time to get Wize", spiky piano and strings on "The Story of Light" and additional programming on "A Touch of the Night".

The album was featured in 1001 Albums You Must Hear Before You Die.

Following Orbit's death, in July 2026, the album debuted the next month at number 73 on the United Kingdom's UK Albums Downloads Chart.

== Track listing ==
No.	Title	Vocalist	Length
1.	"Water from a Vine Leaf"	Beth Orton	7:05
2.	"Into the Paradise"	Baby B	5:41
3.	"Time to get Wize"	Divine Bashim	4:10
4.	"Harry Flowers"		4:31
5.	"A Touch of the Night"	Cleo Torres	5:03
6.	"The Story of Light"	Baby B	6:21
7.	"Gringatcho Demento"	Cleo Torres	6:38
8.	"A Hazy Shade of Random"		5:09
9.	"Best Friend, Paranoia"	Cleo Torres	4:35
10.	"The Monkey King"	Laurie Mayer	5:16
11.	"Deus Ex Machina"		5:40
12.	"Water Babies"		3:42
Total length:			63:51

== Video ==
A seven track long video (six tracks plus closing credits) for Strange Cargo III was released in the UK in 1993 on VHS, and was cataloged as Virgin VID 2707. It was directed and edited by Simon Hilton, and produced by Mike Day and Henry Cole. Cinematography was done by John Peters and Simon Hilton. The production company was Moviescreen Ltd.

=== Track listing ===
1. "Gringatcho Demento" - 6.20
2. "Water from a Vine Leaf" - 7.00
3. "Time to get Wize" - 3.58
4. "Into the Paradise" - 5.33
5. "Harry Flowers" - 4.31
6. "A Touch of the Night" - 5.03
7. "Water Babies" (during credits) - 4.04

=== Weekly charts ===
Weekly chart performance
Chart (2026)	Peak position
UK Albums Downloads (OCC)	73
