= Orbit (William Orbit album) =

Studio album by William Orbit
- Released: June 1987
- Length: 42:44
- Label: I.R.S. Records
- Producer: William Orbit

William Orbit chronology
Orbit (1987)	Strange Cargo (1987)

Professional ratings
Review scores
Source	Rating
Allmusic	link

Orbit is the first studio album by English musician William Orbit. While all of his later solo albums are predominantly instrumental, this album consists mostly of songs with lyrics, with vocals performed by Peta Nikolich. Orbit spawned two singles, "Feel Like Jumping" and "Love My Way" (a cover of the Psychedelic Furs' Love My Way); the music video for "Feel Like Jumping" was directed by Peter Christopherson.

Orbit has described the album as "far from his best" and has suggested that listeners save their money for something else, unless they are "collecto-maniacs". Orbit was out of print since the late-eighties, but was re-released without Orbit's permission in digital form by IRS to coincide with the artist's 2009 release My Oracle Lives Uptown.

== Track listing ==
No.	Title	Length
1.	"Love My Way"	3:35
2.	"Fool to Myself"	4:02
3.	"Heartbroken Highway"	3:53
4.	"Escape to Mexico"	3:35
5.	"Rider in Black"	4:07
6.	"Swamp Dog"	3:59
7.	"Feel Like Jumping"	4:45
8.	"Blue Street"	3:59
9.	"Cluny Ann"	4:17
10.	"The Night Runs Forever"	3:44
11.	"Cry One More Tear"	2:48
Total length:		42:44
