= My Oracle Lives Uptown =

Studio album by William Orbit
- Released: 4 May 2009
- Recorded: Guerilla Studios
- Genres: Ambient, electronica
- Length: 52:48 (Digital release); 72:20 (CD release)
- Label: Kobalt
- Producer: William Orbit

William Orbit chronology
Hello Waveforms (2006)	My Oracle Lives Uptown (2009)	Pieces in a Modern Style 2 (2010)

My Oracle Lives Uptown is the tenth album by British electronic musician and record producer William Orbit. It was released digitally on 4 May 2009 on Kobalt Digital, as a 12-track limited edition. It was released as a physical CD on 8 June 2009 with 16 tracks. The 16 track version was released as a Studio Master quality digital download and on deluxe double 180g vinyl by Linn Records.

== Background ==
The album was produced by William Orbit over a period of six years. Many of the tracks on the final CD have been previously available to listen on the artist's website. Contributors to My Oracle Lives Uptown include Laurie Mayer, from Torch Song; "White Night" is a remake, the track having been previously released by Torch Song.

The song "Purdy" was used in 2007 for Madonna's H&M clothes design campaign. A CD single for the track "Optical Illusions" was released with several remixes and a new mix of the song by Orbit named "Billy Buttons Mix".

The physical release contains a 20-page booklet with art design conceived by Orbit and Laurie Mayer, and put together by his webmaster Richard Shea. Most of the images are photos taken by Orbit himself or Laurie Mayer.

== Marketing ==
For marketing Orbit created a blog on his website on which he posted pictures, information and song downloads weekly. He also used Twitter to post news, opinions and personal pictures as well. He has also appeared on several British TV and radio shows to promote the album.

== Internet leak ==
In May 2009, a promo version of the album was leaked on the internet. The track list for this promo differs from both the digital and CD versions of the final album. The version of "Drift So Far" is slower and more ambient than the website version on the final album. "Optical Illusions" (Billy Buttons Version) on the final album is slightly shorter than the promo version and has been subtly remixed. Unlike the final album, the promo includes "Nimbus", which was later released as a free download from Orbit's blog.

== Track listing ==
=== Digital version ===
No.	Title	Length
1.	"Radioharp"	4:44
2.	"Purdy"	5:33
3.	"Optical Illusions" (Billy Buttons mix)	4:15
4.	"White Night"	3:26
5.	"Hydrajacked"	5:29
6.	"My Oracle Lives Uptown"	4:12
7.	"Spotlight Kid"	4:23
8.	"Neutron Star"	5:46
9.	"Drift So Far" (Website version)	2:57
10.	"Golden Country"	4:16
11.	"Brand New Bong"	3:57
12.	"City Lights Reflection"	3:50
Total length:		52:48

=== CD version ===
No.	Title	Length
1.	"Radioharp"	4:44
2.	"Purdy"	5:35
3.	"Optical Illusions" (Billy Buttons version)	4:18
4.	"Fast Bubble Universe"	4:31
5.	"White Night"	3:27
6.	"Hydrajacked"	5:41
7.	"My Oracle Lives Uptown"	4:14
8.	"Spotlight Kid"	4:23
9.	"Neutron Star"	5:48
10.	"Treetop Club"	4:47
11.	"Drift So Far" (Website version)	2:59
12.	"Golden Country"	4:17
13.	"Brand New Bong"	3:58
14.	"Little Skipper"	4:54
15.	"Reverie of the Tapir"	4:53
16.	"City Lights Reflection"	3:51
Total length:		72:20
