= Pieces in a Modern Style 2 =

Studio album by William Orbit
- Released: 22 August 2010
- Genres: Classical crossover, electronic
- Length: 131:12
- Label: Decca
- Producer: William Orbit

William Orbit chronology
My Oracle Lives Uptown (2009)	Pieces in a Modern Style 2 (2010)

Pieces in a Modern Style 2 is the eleventh album by British electronic musician and record producer, William Orbit. A follow-up to Orbit's 1995 album Pieces in a Modern Style, it was released on compact disc and digital download formats on 22 August 2010 through Decca Records. Orbit's second foray into classical music by way of electronic instrumentation includes, among others, a selection from Pyotr Ilyich Tchaikovsky's Swan Lake. A 2-CD version, with remixes and additional pieces was also released.

A Deutsche Grammophon 2010 release, Classic Originals - Pieces in the Original Style 2 (catalogue number 478 2589) featured the original versions of the tracks on this CD, which included contributions from Cristina Ortiz, Pascal Rogé, András Schiff, Iona Brown and Renée Fleming; conductors included Charles Dutoit, Herbert Blomstedt and Sir Georg Solti.

== Track listing ==
=== CD 1/digital release ===
No.	Title	Length
1.	"Aquarium" (Movement VII from The Carnival of the Animals, Camille Saint-Saëns)	3:37
2.	"Nimrod" (Variation IX (Adagio) Nimrod, Edward Elgar)	8:58
3.	"Alto Giove" (Aci's aria from the opera Polifemo, Act III, Scene 5, Nicola Porpora)	4:06
4.	"Peer Gynt" ("Morning Mood" from Peer Gynt, Suite No. 1, op. 48, Edvard Grieg)	5:31
5.	"Arioso" (Largo from Concerto No. 5 BWV 1056, J. S. Bach)	2:36
6.	"Lark" (material from The Lark Ascending, Ralph Vaughan Williams)	5:48
7.	"Sonnambula" (Amina's aria from La sonnambula, Vincenzo Bellini)	3:35
8.	"Paradisum" (Movement VII "In paradisum" from Requiem in D minor, op. 48, Gabriel Fauré)	3:37
9.	"Pavane" (Pavane in F-sharp minor, op. 50, Gabriel Fauré)	4:47
10.	"Clavier" (Prelude and Fugue No. 1 in C major, BWV 848, The Well-Tempered Clavier, J. S. Bach)	4:25
11.	"Babbino" ("O mio babbino caro" from the opera Gianni Schicchi, Giacomo Puccini and Giovacchino Forzano)	3:45
12.	"Swan Lake" (Act II, Scenes 10 / 14 from Swan Lake, op. 20, Tchaikovsky)	5:15
Total length:		56:00

=== CD 2 ===
No.	Title	Length
1.	"Nimrod (Jakwob Remix)" (Variation IX (Adagio) Nimrod, Edward Elgar)	3:35
2.	"Carmen" (Habanera "L'Amour est un oiseau rebelle", Georges Bizet, adapted from an earlier song by Sebastián Yradier)	4:44
3.	"Aquarium (Remix)" (Movement VII from The Carnival of the Animals, Camille Saint-Saëns)	6:20
4.	"Prelude" (Movement I (Prélude) from Suite No. 1 in G major for cello solo, BWV1007, J.S. Bach)	3:50
5.	"Lark (John Digweed and Nick Muir Remix)" (Based on material from The Lark Ascending, Ralph Vaughan Villiams)	8:05
6.	"Lark (Alex Metric Remix" (Based on material from The Lark Ascending, Ralph Vaughan Villiams)	6:15
7.	"Lark (Rockdaworld Remix)" (Based on material from The Lark Ascending, Ralph Vaughan Villiams)	5:45
8.	"Clavier (Ferry Corsten Remix)" (Prelude and Fugue No. 1 in C major, BWV 848, The Well-Tempered Clavier, J. S. Bach)	7:24
9.	"Nimrod (Timo Maas and Santos Remix)" (Variation IX (Adagio) Nimrod, Edward Elgar)	6:46
10.	"Nisi Dominus" (Based on material from Nisi Dominus, RV 803, Antonio Vivaldi)	4:17
11.	"Nesciens Mater 1" (Motet for eight voices Nesciens mater virgo virum, Jean Mouton)	4:05
12.	"Nesciens Mater 2" (Motet for eight voices Nesciens mater virgo virum, Jean Mouton)	4:05
13.	"Stabat Mater" (Movement I "Stabat Mater" from Stabat Mater, Giovanni Battista Pergolesi)	3:55
14.	"Swan Lake (Rico's Variation)" (Act II, Scenes 10/14 from Swan Lake, op. 20, Tchaikovsky)	6:06
Total length:		75:12 131:12
