= A Happy Place =

Single by Katie Melua

from the album The House
- Released: 23 July 2010 (Digital download); 26 July 2010 (CD single)
- Genre: Progressive rock, house
- Length: 3:29
- Label: Dramatico
- Songwriter(s): Katie Melua, Guy Chambers
- Producer(s): William Orbit

Katie Melua singles chronology
"The Flood" (2010)	"A Happy Place" (2010)	"To Kill You with a Kiss" (2010)

Alternative cover

Music video
- "A Happy Place" on YouTube

"A Happy Place" is a song performed by the Georgian-born, British singer Katie Melua and the second single from her 4th studio album The House. It was released on 12 July 2010, featuring a remix of the track by Sparks.

== Music video ==
The video itself was filmed in a paternoster lift in Haus des Rundfunks, Berlin and directed by Mike Batt. The constant movement of the lift and one's inability to stop it represent the constant flow of life. The hat Melua wears in the video was made by a milliner called Piers Atkinson.

In an interview with The Sun, Melua explained with regards to the video: "It was about finding peace within yourself no matter how much life is flowing in the right or wrong direction."

== Track listing ==
Digital download

No.	Title	Length
1.	"A Happy Place"	3:29
2.	"A Happy Place" (Robbie Rivera's Juicy Ibiza Mix)	8:07
3.	"A Happy Place" (Loverush UK Mix)	3:36
4.	"A Happy Place" (Danny Kirsch Mix)	3:47
5.	"A Happy Place" (Beatnoids Mix)	4:32
6.	"A Happy Place" (Product01mix)	6:12
7.	"A Happy Place" (Sparks Vs Katie Melua)	4:20

CD single</>

No.	Title	Length
1.	"A Happy Place"	3:29
2.	"A Happy Place" (Sparks Vs Katie Melua)	4:20

== Release history ==
Region	Date	Format	Label
United Kingdom	12 July 2010	Airplay	Dramatico
United Kingdom	23 July 2010	Digital download	Dramatico
United Kingdom	26 July 2010	CD single	Dramatico
Germany	3 August 2010	CD single	Dramatico
