= Pieces in a Modern Style =

Studio album by William Orbit
- Released: 1995
- Recorded: 1995
- Genres: Electronic classical; classical crossover; ambient
- Length: 60:05
- Labels: WEA; Warner Music UK (Europe); Maverick (US)
- Producer: William Orbit

William Orbit chronology
The Best of Strange Cargos (1996)	Pieces in a Modern Style (1995)	Hello Waveforms (2006)

Professional ratings
Aggregate scores
Source	Rating
Metacritic	62/100
Review scores
Source	Rating
AllMusic	3/5 stars
Entertainment Weekly	C−
The Daily Telegraph	4/5 stars
Dotmusic	3/5 stars
The Independent	2/5 stars
Mojo	3/5 stars
NME	6/10
Q	3/5 stars
Rolling Stone	3/5 stars

Pieces in a Modern Style is the sixth album by electronic instrumentalist William Orbit. He is credited as arranger, programmer, producer, and performer of the album. It was released in 2000 by WEA and Warner Music UK in Europe and Maverick Records in the United States. Barber's "Adagio for Strings" was the first single from the album; however, the version played on radio and television was a remix by Ferry Corsten. The album is a fusion of classical music, electronica, ambient music and chill out music and contains no vocals. The "Adagio" single reached number four on the UK Singles Chart in December 1999.

The second single was "Pavane pour une Infante Défunte". This again had a different arrangement to the album version, but this time was done by Orbit himself. The single reached number 31 on the UK Singles Chart in May 2000.

The album was originally released in May 1995 on Orbit's N-Gram Recordings label, credited to Orbit alias The Electric Chamber. This version is not widely available, as it was withdrawn from sale almost immediately when Arvo Pärt objected to its inclusion of his compositions "Fratres" and "Cantus in Memoriam Benjamin Britten". The version issued on 22 February 2000 replaced these pieces with works by Beethoven, Vivaldi, Handel and Mascagni, and reached number two on the UK Albums Chart.

A Deutsche Grammophon 2000 release Pieces In The Original Style: Bohemia (Catalogue number 463 450-2) featured the original versions of the tracks on this CD, which included contributions from Anne-Sophie Mutter, Yo-Yo Ma, Gidon Kremer and Mark Seltser; conductors included Leonard Bernstein, Giuseppe Sinopoli and Herbert von Karajan.

In 2010 a follow-up, entitled simply Pieces in a Modern Style 2, was released.

== Track listing ==
No.	Title	Composer	Length
1.	"Adagio for Strings"	Samuel Barber	9:34
2.	"In a Landscape"	John Cage	2:57
3.	"Ogive Number 1"	Erik Satie	6:44
4.	"Cavalleria Rusticana"	Pietro Mascagni	3:19
5.	"Pavane pour une Infante Défunte"	Maurice Ravel	6:11
6.	"L'Inverno"	Antonio Vivaldi	3:57
7.	"Triple Concerto"	Ludwig van Beethoven	5:32
8.	"Xerxes"	Georg Friedrich Händel	4:42
9.	"Piece in the Old Style 1"	Henryk Górecki	5:06
10.	"Piece in the Old Style 3"	Henryk Górecki	5:49
11.	"Opus 132"	Ludwig van Beethoven	6:14
Total length:			60:05

Bonus CD
No.	Title	Composer	Length
1.	"Adagio for Strings (Ferry Corsten Mix)"	Samuel Barber	6:33
2.	"Adagio for Strings (ATB Mix)"	Samuel Barber	7:35
Total length:			14:08 74:13

== Charts ==
=== Weekly charts ===
Chart (2000)	Peak positions
Australian Albums (ARIA)	33
Dutch Albums (Album Top 100)	91
German Albums (Offizielle Top 100)	54
Scottish Albums (Official Charts)	4
UK Albums (Official Charts)	2
US Billboard 200	198
US Top Classical Albums (Billboard)	4

Chart (2026)	Peak positions
UK Albums Downloads (OCC)	42

=== Year-end charts ===
Chart (2000)	Positions
UK Albums (OCC)	84
