= 13 (Blur album) =

Studio album by Blur
- Released: 15 March 1999
- Recorded: June–October 1998
- Studios: Sýrland, Reykjavík; 13, Sarm West and Mayfair, London
- Genres: Art rock; experimental rock; alternative rock
- Length: 66:50
- Labels: Food; Parlophone
- Producers: William Orbit; Blur

Blur chronology
Bustin' + Dronin' (1998)	13 (1999)	The 10 Year Limited Edition Anniversary Box Set (1999)

Singles from 13
- 1. "Tender" Released: 17 February 1999; 2. "Coffee & TV" Released: 28 June 1999; 3. "No Distance Left to Run" Released: 15 November 1999

13 is the sixth studio album by the English alternative rock band Blur, released on 15 March 1999. Continuing the band's stylistic shift away from the Britpop sound of their earlier career, 13 explores art rock and electronic styles. Lyrically, the album is darker and more personal than Blur's previous efforts, being heavily inspired by Damon Albarn's breakup with long-term girlfriend, Justine Frischmann.

Recording took place from June to October 1998 in London and Reykjavík. The album marks a departure of the band's longtime producer, Stephen Street, with his role being filled by William Orbit, who they had chosen after hearing his work on the remix album Bustin' + Dronin' (1998). Relationships between the band members were reported to be strained, with members frequently missing from the sessions. 13 was the last Blur album for over a decade to feature the original line-up, as Coxon later left the band during the 2002 sessions of their next album Think Tank (2003), before returning in 2009.

13 entered the UK Albums Chart at number one, making it Blur's fourth consecutive studio album to reach the top spot. The album was later certified Platinum. 13 also reached number one in Norway and charted within the top 20 in many other countries. The album produced three singles – "Tender", "Coffee & TV" and "No Distance Left to Run" – which charted at number 2, number 11 and number 14 respectively on the UK Singles Chart. 13 met with favourable reviews and received a nomination for the Mercury Prize, as well as for Best Album at the 2000 NME Awards.

== Background ==
Blur's previous studio album, Blur (1997), had seen the band move away from the Britpop movement and take on a more alternative rock-influenced direction, primarily under the suggestion of guitarist Graham Coxon. The press and the industry had feared that the change in style would not be taken well with the public, and therefore the album would be commercially unsuccessful as a result. Despite these concerns, Blur was an unexpected success, particularly in America, where the album was certified gold. However, the band still wanted to innovate, so they decided to embrace a different sound. Bassist Alex James stated, "I think you just have to keep changing. That sort of thinking was, sort of, key."

The band's leader Damon Albarn had been in a long-term relationship with Justine Frischmann, of the Britpop band Elastica. Their relationship was highly publicised, the couple being described by John Harris as "proto-Posh and Becks for the indie-rock constituency." However, their relationship became strained over time, stated reasons including Albarn's desire to have children as well as Frischmann's continued friendship with ex-boyfriend Brett Anderson of Suede, who had shared a musical rivalry with Albarn. Albarn's lyrics and attitude had reflected this in the eyes of the other band members, with Coxon pointing out, "I didn't have much of a clue that things were going wrong between Damon and Justine but it was probably easy to guess." After one last holiday together in Bali in late 1997 in an attempt to rekindle their relationship, the couple finally split. Albarn later commented, "That relationship just absolutely crashed. I mean, it really was a spectacularly sad end."

After his breakup, Albarn started sharing a flat with artist Jamie Hewlett whom he had met through Coxon. Around this time, Albarn had started to broaden his musical output. Whilst he was working on 13, there were various reports that he and Hewlett were working on a secret project, which turned out to be Gorillaz, a virtual band. Albarn also started working on film soundtracks, including Ravenous, Ordinary Decent Criminal and 101 Reykjavík.

== Recording ==
13 is Blur's first album without longtime producer Stephen Street. Instead the band "unanimously" decided that they wanted electronic music artist William Orbit to produce the album after being impressed by his remix of their track, "Movin' On", included on the remix compilation, Bustin' + Dronin' (1998). Albarn commented that "it was such a personal thing going on, we needed to have someone who didn't really know us". He also described Orbit as being "like a psychiatrist". When asked if his replacement had come as a shock, Street stated, "I just think they wanted to stretch out a bit more and, having made five albums with me, the best way to do that was to work with someone different who would approach the project in a different way. I understand that perfectly and certainly wasn't offended. I did five albums with the band and I must admit I thought each one would be the last because they were bound to want to try something new." Albarn described the decision to not work with Street as "difficult", going on to say "he'll be forever part of what we are, and ironically, he gave us the tools we needed to go it alone."

Tension in the studio ran high during the recording sessions. In Orbit's words, "There was a battle between Damon's more experimental direction, and Graham's punk one, and Graham prevailed. If that tension had been growing on previous LPs, it came to a head here." "Things were starting to fall apart between the four of us," drummer Dave Rowntree later revealed. "It was quite a sad process making it. People were not turning up to the sessions, or turning up drunk, being abusive and storming off." "I had songs," Alex James remarked. "I played them to William. He liked them. But I was sulking. I didn't play them to the others... Now I know how George Harrison felt." Coxon admitted, "I was really out there around 13, which made for some pretty great noise but I was probably a bit of a crap to be around."

"1992" had originally been recorded as a demo in 1992 and was lost until Albarn found it again on a tape six years later. "Mellow Song" was demoed as a jam session known as "Mellow Jam" that was later included as the B-side of "Tender".

== Musical style and composition ==
13 sees the band moving further away from their Britpop past into more cerebral and dense musical territory. Some of the songs, however, are evocative of songs from their previous efforts, such as "Bugman", "Coffee & TV" and "1992". "Bugman" has an industrial rock sound. The instrumental closer "Optigan 1" was created using an Optigan optical organ. The album is in the style of a loose concept album, much like other Blur albums, in this case about life and relationships. Much of the album was inspired by Albarn's breakup with Elastica singer Justine Frischmann. Two of the singles, "Tender" and "No Distance Left to Run", describe Albarn's love for Frischmann and his struggle to move on. The album features several short hidden tracks at the end of songs, stretching the playing time out; examples of this are "Coffee & TV", "B.L.U.R.E.M.I.", "Battle" and "Caramel", the latter of which features two hidden tracks. The album is named after the band's recording studio as well as the number of tracks on the album (bar the hidden tracks).

== Artwork ==
The cover is a portion of an oil painting by Graham Coxon called Apprentice. Whilst Coxon initially suggested the piece was a self-portrait upon the album's release, he later revealed in his 2022 memoir Verse, Chorus, Monster! that the central figure was modelled after Adso of Melk from Umberto Eco's novel The Name of the Rose. The album's singles also have cover art by Coxon. The numbers 1 and 3 have been painted so they also form the letter "B" – revealed on the back cover to be for Blur. This was not present on the original Apprentice, nor was the "shine" on the figure's head, which appears on 13. These additions were made long after the original Apprentice, which was painted in 1996. The band's logo does not appear on the album in any form, aside from a sticker on the CD packaging. The logo is also absent from the single covers.

== Release and reception ==
Professional ratings
Aggregate scores
Source	Rating
Metacritic	79/100
Review scores
Source	Rating
AllMusic	3.5/5 stars
Entertainment Weekly	B+
The Guardian	4/5 stars
The List	4/5 stars
NME	6/10
Pitchfork	9.1/10 (1999); 9.5/10 (2012)
Q	4/5 stars
Rolling Stone	3.5/5 stars
Spin	8/10
USA Today	3/4 stars

13 holds an overall approval rating of 79 out of 100 on online review aggregator Metacritic based on 17 reviews, indicating "generally favorable reviews". Tom Doyle of Q called 13 "a dense, fascinating, idiosyncratic and accomplished art rock album", while an enthusiastic Brent DiCrescenzo of Pitchfork stated that "Blur have finally found a sound to match their name." PopMatters' Sarah Zupko praised Blur's new musical approach and wrote that "proving they have the goods of a truly exceptional band, Blur has done what the greats have done before them—evolved." Rob Sheffield of Rolling Stone called the album "their sloppiest, most playful set, spiking the mix with church organ, electric piano and shambling drum loops." Record Collector's Jason Draper described 13 as a "masterpiece" that stands as arguably the band's "greatest work".

In a more mixed assessment, Heather Phares of AllMusic felt that "the group's ambitions to expand their musical and emotional horizons result in a half-baked baker's dozen of songs, featuring some of their most creative peaks and self-indulgent valleys." Keith Cameron of NME concluded that 13 was "Blur's most inconsistent and infuriating statement thus far. Infuriating, because divested of four solid-gone clunkers 13 could pass muster as the best of Blur." Robert Christgau gave the album a three-star honourable mention rating, indicating "an enjoyable effort consumers attuned to its overriding aesthetic or individual vision may well treasure", and remarked that "halfway there, it sits down in the middle of the road and won't budge."

The music video for the hit single "Coffee & TV" cemented Blur's reputation as a cult band in the US with its protagonist Milky. The video gained heavy airplay on many modern rock channels in America.

== Accolades ==
13 was nominated in the Album of the Year category at the 2000 NME Awards, losing to The Soft Bulletin by The Flaming Lips. 13 was also nominated for the 1999 Mercury Prize, being Blur's second album to receive a nomination. The award was eventually given to Talvin Singh for OK.

The album is ranked number 773 in All-Time Top 1000 Albums (3rd edition, 2000).

Accolades for 13
Publication	Country	Accolade	Year	Rank
Eye Weekly	Canada	Albums of the Year	1999	19
Metal Hammer	UK	The 200 Greatest Albums of the 90s	2006	*
Melody Maker	UK	Albums of the Year	1999	2
Mojo	UK	Albums of the Year	1999	22
NME	UK	Albums of the Year	1999	19
Pitchfork	US	Albums of the Year	1999	10
Pitchfork	US	Top 100 Albums of the 1990s	1999	82
Pittsburgh Post-Gazette	US	The Best of 1999	1999	1
Q	UK	Albums of the Year	1999	*
Q	UK	250 Best Albums Q's Lifetime (1986–2011)	2011	98
Rolling Stone	Germany	Albums of the Year	1999	3
Select	UK	Albums of the Year	1999	11
Spin	US	300 Best Albums of the Past 30 Years (1985–2014)	2015	96
Village Voice	US	Albums of the Year	1999	45

== Track listing ==
All lyrics are written by Damon Albarn, except where noted; all music is composed by Blur (Albarn, Graham Coxon, Alex James, Dave Rowntree).

No.	Title	Lyrics	Length
1.	"Tender"	Albarn, Coxon	7:40
2.	"Bugman"		4:47
3.	"Coffee & TV"	Coxon	5:58
4.	"Swamp Song" ( (Note: "Swamp Song" is a reference to an Oasis track from 1995: "The Swamp Song" Blur's "Swamp Song" was originally going to appear on the "Tender" single as a B-side, but was put on the album at the last minute.))		4:36
5.	"1992"		5:29
6.	"B.L.U.R.E.M.I."		2:52
7.	"Battle"		7:43
8.	"Mellow Song"		3:56
9.	"Trailerpark" ( (Note: "Trailerpark" was originally intended for the South Park album Chef Aid, but was rejected by Rick Rubin.))		4:26
10.	"Caramel"		7:38
11.	"Trimm Trabb"		5:37
12.	"No Distance Left to Run"		3:27
13.	"Optigan 1" (instrumental)		2:34
Total length:			66:50

Disc 2: 2012 special edition
No.	Title	Length
1.	"French Song"	8:21
2.	"All We Want"	4:33
3.	"Mellow Jam"	3:56
4.	"X-Offender" (Damon/Control Freak's Bugman Remix)	5:38
5.	"Coyote" (Dave's Bugman Remix)	3:50
6.	"Trade Stylee" (Alex's Bugman Remix)	5:58
7.	"Metal Hip Slop" (Graham's Bugman Remix)	4:16
8.	"So You"	4:11
9.	"Beagle 2"	2:54
10.	"Tender" (Cornelius Remix)	5:23
11.	"Far Out" (Beagle 2 Remix)	3:58
12.	"I Got Law" (demo (Note: The Japanese bonus track "I Got Law" (demo version) was developed into the Gorillaz hit single "Tomorrow Comes Today".))	2:43
13.	"Music Is My Radar"	5:29
14.	"Black Book"	8:31
15.	"Caramel" (remix; Japan exclusive bonus track)	4:54

Notes

- As well as having 13 tracks, Coxon also uses '13th' chords on several of the tracks including "Bugman", "Coffee & TV" and "B.L.U.R.E.M.I."

== Personnel ==
=== Blur ===
- Damon Albarn – vocals, piano, keyboards, acoustic guitar, melodica, backing vocals on "Coffee & TV"
- Graham Coxon – lead and rhythm guitars, banjo, saxophone, slide guitar on "Swamp Song", lead vocals on "Coffee & TV" and co-lead vocals on "Tender", backing vocals, cover artwork
- Alex James – bass guitar, backing vocals, double bass on "Tender"
- Dave Rowntree – drums, percussion

=== Additional musicians ===
- The London Community Gospel Choir – vocals on "Tender"
- Jason Cox – additional drums on "Battle"

=== Technical personnel ===
- Produced by William Orbit and Blur, except "Trailerpark" produced by Blur
- John Smith, Jason Cox, William Orbit – engineering
- Gerard Navarro, Arnþór "Addi 800" Örlygsson and Iain Roberton – additional engineering
- Sean Spuehler, Damian LeGassick – Pro Tools programming
- Mastered by Howie Weinberg at Masterdisk, New York

=== Production ===
All tracks produced by William Orbit, except "Trailerpark" produced by Blur and "I Got Law" (demo version) produced by Damon Albarn

== Charts and certifications ==
=== Weekly charts ===
Weekly chart performance for 13
Chart (1999)	Peak position
Argentinian Albums (CAPIF)	1
Australian Albums (ARIA)	12
Austrian Albums (Ö3 Austria)	12
Belgian Albums (Ultratop Flanders)	22
Belgian Albums (Ultratop Wallonia)	29
Canadian Albums (Billboard)	11
Dutch Albums (Album Top 100)	60
European Albums (Billboard)	1
Finnish Albums (Suomen virallinen lista)	17
French Albums (SNEP)	12
German Albums (Offizielle Top 100)	6
Icelandic Albums (Tónlist)	5
Irish Albums (IRMA)	1
Italian Albums (FIMI)	9
Japanese Albums (Oricon)	13
New Zealand Albums (RMNZ)	2
Norwegian Albums (VG-lista)	1
Scottish Albums (Official Charts)	1
Spanish Albums (AFYVE)	10
Swedish Albums (Sverigetopplistan)	4
Swiss Albums (Schweizer Hitparade)	12
UK Albums (Official Charts)	1
US Billboard 200	80

=== Year-end charts ===
1999 year-end chart performance for 13
Chart (1999)	Position
UK Albums (OCC)	43

=== Certifications and sales ===
Certifications and sales for 13
Region	Certification	Certified units/sales
Canada (Music Canada)	Gold	50,000^{^}
Denmark (IFPI Danmark)	Gold	10,000^{‡}
Japan (RIAJ)	Gold	100,000^{^}
New Zealand (RMNZ)	Platinum	15,000^{^}
Spain (Promusicae)	Gold	50,000^{^}
United Kingdom (BPI)	Platinum	300,000^{^}
United States	—	136,000
^{^} Shipments figures based on certification alone.^{‡} Sales+streaming figures based on certification alone.
