= Music Is My Radar =

Single by Blur

from the album Blur: The Best Of
- Released: 16 October 2000
- Length: 6:34 (alternative version); 5:29 (album version); 4:21 (radio edit)
- Label: Parlophone; Food; EMI
- Songwriter(s): Damon Albarn; Graham Coxon; Alex James; Dave Rowntree
- Producer(s): Blur, Ben Hillier

Blur singles chronology
"No Distance Left to Run" (1999)	"Music Is My Radar" (2000)	"Don't Bomb When You're the Bomb" (2002)

Music video
- "Music Is My Radar" on YouTube

"Music Is My Radar" is a song by English rock band Blur. As a single, it reached No. 10 in the UK. It was released in support of the band's greatest hits compilation, Blur: The Best Of, on which it was the only song that had not previously appeared on an album. An alternative version called "Squeezebox" appeared in 2012 on one of the rarities CDs from the Blur 21 box collection, released to celebrate the 21st anniversary of their debut album release, Leisure.

Nigerian musician Tony Allen, who is repeatedly mentioned in the lyrics, later collaborated with Blur frontman Damon Albarn as the drummer in the supergroups The Good, the Bad & the Queen and Rocket Juice & the Moon, and appears posthumously with Albarn on the 2020 Gorillaz song "How Far?".

== Reception ==
Pitchfork critic Richard M. Juzwiak described the song as "truly one of [Blur's] best", adding: "It's minimalist, groovy, and combines the shiny poppy old Blur with the ragged noisy new Blur perfectly." Daniel Durchholz of Wall of Sound called it "vital", while a less enthused Stephen Thomas Erlewine saw it as "good, not great".

Conversely, Graham Reed of Drowned in Sound called the song a "creative misfire" that is "devoid of tune or melody", while NME critic Steve Sutherland labelled it a "will-this-do Talking Headsy clunkalong".

== Music video ==
The video shows Blur on a 1960s/1970s-inspired "Variety Hour" talk show where they sit on a couch (embedded into the red floor) while a group of dancers in black (male) and white (female) MOD-esque outfits perform a dance routine to accompany the song during an interval break. Those outfits are clearly inspired to the costumes created by the Sorelle Fontana for the dystopian movie “La decima vittima” by italian director Elio Petri. The dance choreography itself was executed by Blanca Li.

The music video was not included on the Blur: The Best Of VHS/DVD but was on the Blur 21 box set in 2012.

== Track listings ==
- CD1
1. "Music Is My Radar" (radio edit) – 4:21
2. "Black Book" – 8:30
3. "Headist" / "Into Another" (live) – 3:45
- CD2
1. "Music Is My Radar" (radio edit) – 4:21
2. "7 Days" (live) – 3:28
3. "She's So High" (live) – 4:45
- Cassette
1. "Music Is My Radar" (radio edit) – 4:21
2. "Black Book" – 8:30
3. "She's So High" (live) – 4:45
- 12" vinyl
1. "Music Is My Radar" (album version) – 5:29
2. "Black Book" – 8:30
- Japan and Europe CD
1. "Music Is My Radar" (radio edit) – 4:21
2. "Black Book" – 8:30
3. "7 Days" (live) – 3:28
4. "She's So High" (live) – 4:45
- "Headist" / "Into Another" and "7 Days" were recorded for Radio One's Evening Session. First transmission date 5 May 1992.
- "She's So High" was recorded for Radio One's Mark Goodier Show. First transmission date 24 June 1990.

== Credits and personnel ==
- Damon Albarn – vocals, synthesizers, acoustic guitar
- Graham Coxon – electric guitar
- Alex James – bass guitar
- Dave Rowntree – drums
- "Music Is My Radar" produced by Blur and Ben Hillier
- "Black Book" produced by Chris Potter
