= Pavane pour une infante défunte =

Composition by Maurice Ravel

- by Maurice Ravel
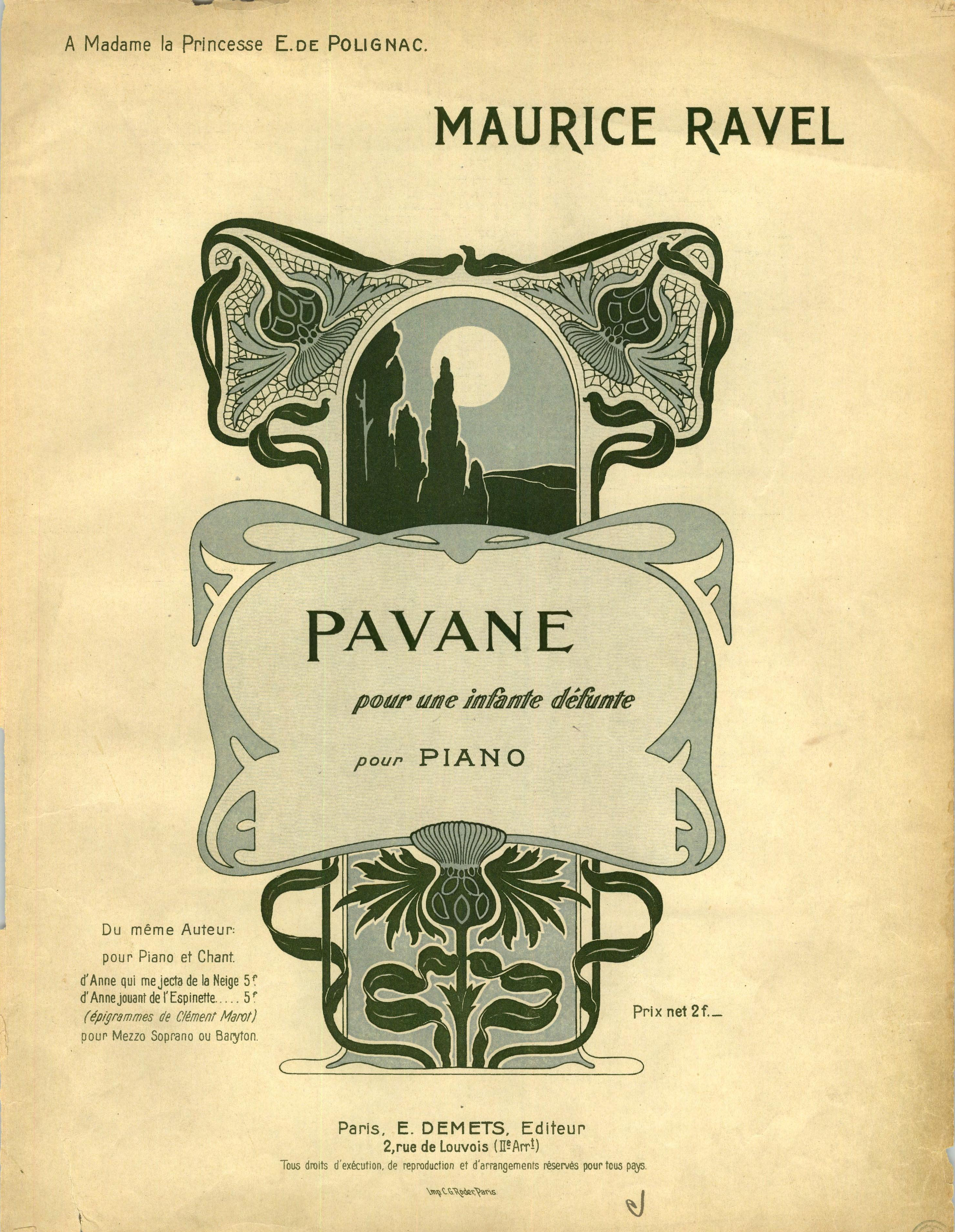
- English: Pavane for a Dead Princess
- Key: G major
- Based on: Pavane
- Composed: 1899
- Dedication: Princesse de Polignac
- Performed: 5 April 1902
- Published: 1900
- Scoring: Piano (later: orchestra)

Pavane pour une infante défunte (Pavane for a Dead Princess) is a work for solo piano by Maurice Ravel, written in 1899 while the French composer was studying at the Conservatoire de Paris under Gabriel Fauré. Ravel published an orchestral version in 1910 using two flutes, an oboe, two clarinets (in B♭), two bassoons, two horns, harp, and strings. The Pavane lasts between six and seven minutes and is considered a masterpiece.

== History ==
Ravel described the piece as "an evocation of a pavane that a little princess [Infanta] might, in former times, have danced at the Spanish court". The pavane was a slow processional dance that enjoyed great popularity in the courts of Europe during the sixteenth and seventeenth centuries.

This antique miniature is not meant to pay tribute to any particular princess from history, but rather expresses a nostalgic enthusiasm for Spanish customs and sensibilities, which Ravel shared with many of his contemporaries (most notably Debussy and Albéniz) and which is evident in some of his other works such as the Rapsodie espagnole and the Boléro.

Ravel dedicated the Pavane to his patron, the Princesse de Polignac, and he probably performed the work at the princess's home on several occasions. It was first published by Eugène Demets in 1900, but it attracted little attention until the Spanish pianist Ricardo Viñes gave the first performance on 5 April 1902. The work soon became very popular, although Ravel came to think of it as "poor in form" and unduly influenced by the music of Chabrier.

In early 1912, Ravel reviewed another pianist's performance of the piece, commenting: "By an ironic coincidence, the first work about which I am called to report happens to be my own Pavane pour une Infante défunte. I do not feel in the least embarrassed to talk about it; it is sufficiently old to let the composer give it up to the critic. From so far, I do not see its merits any more; but, alas! I can see its defects very well: the influence of Chabrier, which is too obvious, and the rather poor form. In my belief, the remarkable interpretation contributed much toward the success of this timorous, incomplete work."

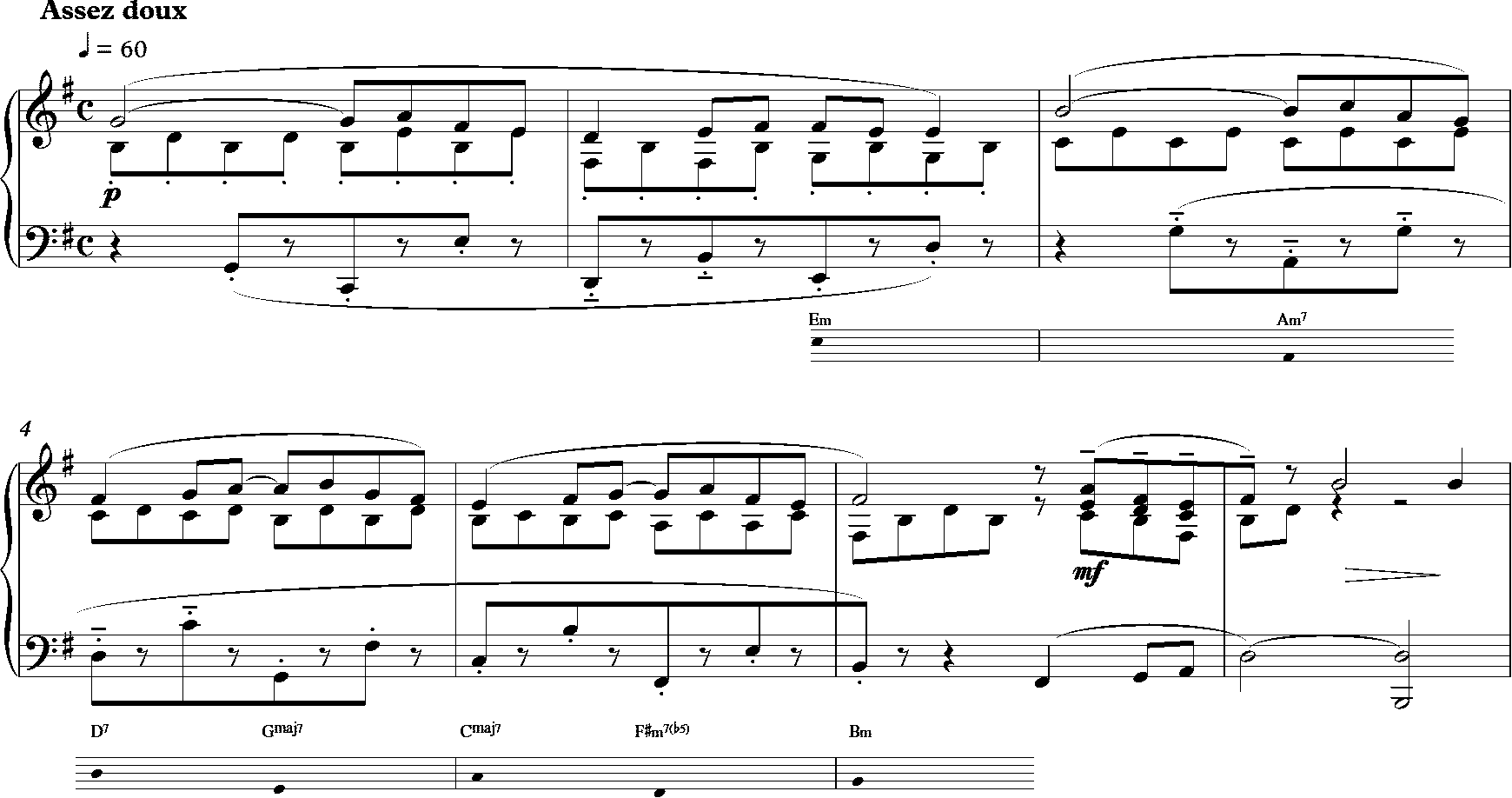
Beginning

Ravel intended the piece to be played extremely slowly – more slowly than almost any modern interpretation, according to his biographer Benjamin Ivry. The critic Émile Vuillermoz complained that Ravel's playing of the work was "unutterably slow". However, the composer was not impressed by interpretations that plodded. After a performance by Charles Oulmont, Ravel mentioned to him that the piece was called "Pavane for a dead princess", not "dead pavane for a princess". When asked by the composer-conductor Manoah Leide-Tedesco how he arrived at the title Pavane pour une infante défunte, Ravel smiled coyly and replied, "Do not be surprised, that title has nothing to do with the composition. I simply liked the sound of those words and I put them there, c'est tout". However, Ravel also stated that the piece depicted a pavane as it would be danced by an Infanta found in a painting by Diego Velázquez.

Pavane pour une infante défunte (5:08)
Performed by Thérèse Dussaut, 1976

When Ravel published his orchestrated version of the Pavane in 1910, he gave the lead melody to the horn, and specified a non-generic instrument: the score calls for "2 Cors simples en sol" (two hand-horns in G). The teaching of the valveless hand-horn had persisted longer in the Paris Conservatory than in other European centers; only in 1903 had the valve horn replaced it as the official horn of primary instruction. The orchestral score was published in 1910. The premiere was given on 27 February 1911 in Manchester, England, conducted by Sir Henry Wood. Reviewing the concert, the critic Samuel Langford called the work "most beautiful" and added, "The piece is hardly representative of the composer, with whom elusive harmonies woven in rapid figuration are the usual medium of expression. In the Pavane we get normal, almost archaic harmonies, subdued expression, and a somewhat remote beauty of melody."

The first gramophone recording of the Pavane was made in 1921 in Paris. A later recording, made in Paris in 1932 is sometimes thought to have been conducted by the composer, but was actually conducted by Pedro de Freitas Branco, under the supervision of Ravel, who was present at rehearsal and the recording session.

Ravel himself made a piano roll recording of the piece in 1922.

== Popularity ==
As of 2020, it is ranked 230th in the Classic FM Hall of Fame, aggregated over 25 years.

== Adaptations ==
In addition to numerous recorded performances within the classical repertoire, the Pavane maintains a significant presence in popular music. In particular, the song "The Lamp Is Low" was adapted from it. More recently, the Pavane appears in dozens of popular albums under both French and English forms of its title.

Pavane pour une infante defunte (5:32)
Arranged for saxophone and piano, performed at Museum of Romanticism (Madrid) in 2015 by David Hernando Vitores and Kayoko Morimoto

It was recorded by Pedro Aznar on his eponymous album (1982), in which he made use of synthesizers instead of acoustic instruments. Some unusual interpretations include another electronic version by William Orbit in Pieces in a Modern Style (2000), Isao Tomita (1979) and the all-female synthesizer quartet Hello, Wendy (2014). Edgar Meyer recorded a version for double bass and piano on his CD Work in Progress (1990), a solo bass guitar version by Jimmy Earl (1995), and Hayley Westenra's vocal adaptation "Never Say Goodbye", which appears in her album Pure (2004).
