= The Flood (Katie Melua song) =

Single by Katie Melua

from the album The House
- Released: 17 May 2010 (Digital download) 24 May (CD single)
- Genre: Art rock; orchestral rock
- Length: 4:01 (Album Version); 3:40 (Radio Edit); 3:49 (Danny Kirsch Radio Edit)
- Label: Dramatico
- Songwriters: Katie Melua, Guy Chambers, Lauren Christy
- Producer: William Orbit

Katie Melua singles chronology
"If the Lights Go Out" (2008)	"The Flood" (2010)	"A Happy Place" (2010)

Music video
- "The Flood" on YouTube

"The Flood" is a song performed by the Georgian-born, British singer Katie Melua and the lead single from her 4th studio album The House. It was released on 17 May 2010 by Digital download and by CD on 24 May 2010.

== Music video ==
The music video was directed by Kevin Godley, who has also directed videos for Eric Clapton and U2, as well as having directed the video for Melua's "Nine Million Bicycles". It features Melua performing the song playing the piano on a spinning platform surrounded by male dancers.

== Critical reception ==
Nick Levine of Digital Spy gave the song a favorable review, stating, "there's no doubting her sincerity." He felt the song was both positive and interesting, with a blend of styles and tempos that he described as "supremely elegant and subtly adventurous".

== Track listing ==
Digital download

No.	Title	Length
1.	"The Flood" (Radio Edit)	3:40
2.	"The Flood" (Danny Kirsch Radio Edit)	3:49
3.	"The Flood" (Michael Woods Remix)	4:40
4.	"The Flood" (Jakwob Remix)	4:57
5.	"The Flood Aid" (DJ Vata Mashup)	7.25

CD single

No.	Title	Length
1.	"The Flood"	3:40
2.	"The One I Love Is Gone"	3:40

== Chart performance ==
"The Flood" debuted on the UK singles chart on 23 May 2010 at its peak of No. 35.

=== Weekly charts ===
Chart (2010)	Peak position
Belgium (Ultratop 50 Flanders)	23
Belgium (Ultratop 50 Wallonia)	7
Netherlands (Single Top 100)	79
Norway (VG-lista)	3
Switzerland (Schweizer Hitparade)	19
UK Singles (OCC)	35
UK Indie (OCC)	2
US Dance Club Songs (Billboard)	36

=== Year-end charts ===
Chart (2010)	Position
Belgium (Ultratop Wallonia)	65

== Release history ==
Region	Date	Format	Label
United Kingdom	17 May 2010	Digital download	Dramatico
United Kingdom	24 May 2010	CD single	Dramatico
