= The House (Katie Melua album) =

Studio album by Katie Melua
- Released: 24 May 2010
- Genres: Pop; jazz; progressive rock
- Length: 45:44
- Label: Dramatico
- Producer: William Orbit

Katie Melua chronology
Live at the O² Arena (2009)	The House (2010)	Secret Symphony (2012)

Singles from The House
- 1. "The Flood" Released: 17 May 2010; 2. "A Happy Place" Released: 12 July 2010; 3. "To Kill You With A Kiss" (single title) "I'd Love To Kill You (album title)" Released: 26 November 2010

The House is the fourth studio album by British singer Katie Melua. It was released by Dramatico on 24 May 2010. It marked her first album without long-time producer and mentor Mike Batt in a primary production role, although he remained involved as executive producer after shaping her early career and sound. Production was led by William Orbit, whose background brought a more contemporary and experimental direction compared with her earlier style. Melua also worked with songwriter Guy Chambers, and described the writing process as more instinctive and less overthought than in previous projects.

The album received mixed reviews from critics, who generally praised its more mature production and standout tracks while remaining divided over its songwriting consistency and the effectiveness of Melua's stylistic shift. The House was a commercial success across Europe, reaching number one in Belgium, Poland, Switzerland, and on the European Top 100 Albums chart, and entering the top five in several other major markets, including the United Kingdom, Germany, and the Netherlands. The album's lead single, “The Flood”, was released on 17 May 2010. It was followed by A Happy Place" in July 2010, which included a remix by Sparks, and "To Kill You With a Kiss," released in November 2010.

== Background ==
The House, Katie Melua's fourth studio album, marked her first project not produced by her long-time collaborator and mentor Mike Batt, who had been central to shaping her early sound and success,c omposing and producing several of her best-known songs. For The House, Melua worked primarily with producer William Orbit, who brought a more contemporary and experimental approach compared with her earlier, more acoustic and traditional style. Although Batt stepped back from direct production, he retained an executive producer role and remained involved in the project in an advisory capacity.

Melua also collaborated with songwriter Guy Chambers, and described the writing process as more instinctive and less overthought than in the past. She emphasised a shift toward creative independence, stating that the album was driven by personal exploration rather than commercial considerations. The album reflected a stylistic evolution from her earlier work, incorporating more varied production influences while maintaining her characteristic melodic and acoustic elements. Melua also addressed perceptions of her audience, acknowledging that her fan base had traditionally skewed older, largely due to her earlier marketing and musical style, though she expressed openness to reaching new listeners as a secondary outcome rather than a primary goal.

== Critical reception ==
Professional ratings
Review scores
Source	Rating
AllMusic	3.5/5 stars
Daily Express	3/5 stars
The Daily Telegraph	3/5 stars
Evening Standard	3/5 stars
The Guardian	3/5 stars
Mojo	3/5 stars
musicOMH	3.5/5 stars
Rolling Stone	3/5 stars
Slant Magazine	3.5/5 stars

The House received mixed reviews, with critics praising its more mature production and standout tracks, but dividing over inconsistent songwriting and whether Katie Melua’s stylistic shift was a genuine breakthrough. Simon Gage of the Daily Express called the album "a real leap forward lyrically, musically and vocally," describing it as "dark, beautiful and grown-up" and suggesting it marked the point where Melua "starts being taken seriously," awarding it three out of five stars. Writing for The Daily Telegraph, Neil McCormick likewise praised the ballads "I'd Love to Kill You" and "Red Balloons," calling the latter "elegant" and "tender," and felt the album showed Melua "finally justifying her artistic existence," also rating it three out of five. BBC Music's Mike Diver called the album "largely a success," praising tracks like "The Flood" and "Red Balloons" and moments of intimacy, though he noted some formulaic arrangements and "forgettable filler." Mark Kemp from Rolling Stone described it as a stylistic leap blending "sci-fi disco fantasy" and "organic bluesy brooders," but saw it as a "mixed bag" that only partly justified Melua’s popularity.

Slant Magazine's Jesse Cataldo described The House as "an assured, mature collaboration" between Katie Melua and producer William Orbit, praising it as "an often great breakthrough" and highlighting Orbit's production throughout the album. Although he criticized some of Melua's lyrics and argued that her voice was not always equal to the material, Cataldo concluded that The House was "a sporadically grand album that finds another talented artist rescued from mediocre pop oblivion." Michael Cragg, writing in The Guardian praised Orbit’s restrained production but criticized some lyrics as "banal," while Matt James of PopMatters called it a partial reinvention with strong atmospheric moments but inconsistent execution, concluding it was "fragrantly classy" but uneven. More critically, David Smyth of The Evening Standard felt Melua’s vocals still sounded "more soppy than sinister," and Hugh Montgomery of The Observer dismissed the album as "a case of the emperor's new clothes," criticizing its "nondescript balladry" and underwhelming vocal delivery.

== Commercial performance ==
The House experienced widespread commercial success across Europe following its release in 2010. The album reached number one in Belgium's Wallonian region, Poland, Switzerland, and on a composite European Top 100 Albums chart. It also peaked within the top five in several major markets, including Austria, Denmark, the Netherlands, Germany, Norway, Scotland, and the United Kingdom, where it reached number four on the UK Albums Chart with 29,611 copies sold in its first week, also reaching number one on the UK Independent Albums Chart. Additional top-ten placements included France, Sweden, and Finland.

Outside Europe, the album achieved more modest chart success. In North America, it peaked at number 100 on the Canadian RPM Top Albums/CDs chart and reached number 10 on Billboard's US Heatseekers Albums chart. It also charted in New Zealand, reaching number 15 on the New Zealand Singles Chart. The album was certified Gold in Belgium, Germany, and the United Kingdom, and Platinum in Poland and Switzerland, based on sales and shipment thresholds in each territory.

== Track listing ==
All tracks produced by William Orbit.

No.	Title	Writer(s)	Length
1.	"I'd Love to Kill You"	Katie Melua; Guy Chambers	2:57
2.	"The Flood"	Melua; Chambers; Lauren Christy	4:03
3.	"A Happy Place"	Melua; Chambers	3:27
4.	"A Moment of Madness"	Melua; Chambers	3:47
5.	"Red Balloons"	Melua; Polly Scattergood	4:20
6.	"Tiny Alien"	Melua; Chambers	4:36
7.	"No Fear of Heights"	Melua	2:53
8.	"The One I Love Is Gone"	Bill Monroe	3:38
9.	"Plague of Love"	Melua; Rick Nowels	3:26
10.	"God on the Drums, Devil on the Bass"	Melua; Mike Batt	3:48
11.	"Twisted"	Melua; Nowels	3:44
12.	"The House"	Melua	5:00
Total length:			45:44

== Personnel ==
- Katie Melua – lead vocals, guitar
- Tim Harries – bass, piano on track 12
- Luke Potashnick – guitars
- Steve Donnelly – guitars
- Henry Spinetti – drums
- Arden Hart – keyboards

=== Additional musicians ===
- B J Cole – pedal steel on tracks 1, 5, 9
- Dominic Miller – guitar on tracks 5, 9
- Jim Watson – piano on track 2
- Keith Brazil – drums on track 3
- Paul Stanborough – mandolin on track 2
- Fergus Gerrand – drums on tracks 2, 6, 9–11
- William Orbit – kalimba on track 6

== Charts ==
=== Weekly charts ===
Weekly chart performance for The House
Chart (2010)	Peak position
Austrian Albums (Ö3 Austria)	3
Belgian Albums (Ultratop Flanders)	3
Belgian Albums (Ultratop Wallonia)	1
Canada Top Albums/CDs (RPM)	100
Danish Albums (Hitlisten)	2
Dutch Albums (Album Top 100)	3
European Top 100 Albums (Billboard)	1
Finnish Albums (Suomen virallinen lista)	15
French Albums (SNEP)	5
German Albums (Offizielle Top 100)	3
Irish Albums (IRMA)	18
Italian Albums (FIMI)	51
New Zealand Albums (RMNZ)	15
Norwegian Albums (VG-lista)	3
Polish Albums (ZPAV)	1
Portuguese Albums (AFP)	14
Scottish Albums (Official Charts)	5
Spanish Albums (Promusicae)	34
Swedish Albums (Sverigetopplistan)	10
Swiss Albums (Schweizer Hitparade)	1
UK Albums (Official Charts)	4
UK Independent Albums (Official Charts)	1
US Heatseekers Albums (Billboard)	10

=== Year-end charts ===
Year-end chart performance for The House
Chart (2010)	Position
Belgian Albums (Ultratop Flanders)	60
Belgian Albums (Ultratop Wallonia)	20
European Top 100 Albums (Billboard)	33
Danish Albums (Hitlisten)	41
Dutch Albums (Album Top 100)	44
French Albums (SNEP)	85
German Albums (Offizielle Top 100)	72
Swiss Albums (Schweizer Hitparade)	17
UK Albums (OCC)	125

== Certifications ==
Certifications for The House
Region	Certification	Certified units/sales
Belgium (BRMA)	Gold	15,000^{*}
Germany (BVMI)	Gold	100,000^{^}
Poland (ZPAV)	Platinum	20,000^{*}
Switzerland (IFPI Switzerland)	Platinum	30,000^{^}
United Kingdom (BPI)	Gold	100,000^{^}
^{*} Sales figures based on certification alone.^{^} Shipments figures based on certification alone.
