= Rico Conning =

British musician and producer

Rico Conning is an English record producer, songwriter, sound designer, and guitarist. In his early career (1977–'83) he was a singer, songwriter and guitarist with London-based post-punk band, the Lines. During the 1980s, he worked often at North London's Guerilla Studios, producing and mixing for artists such as Adam Ant, Coil, Depeche Mode, Renegade Soundwave, Wire, Swans, Laibach, Étienne Daho, and others. He moved to Los Angeles in the 1990s and formed a successful sound design company, M62. Around that time, he also joined the group Torch Song, whose other members included William Orbit and Laurie Mayer. The first album they made together was Toward the Unknown Region (1994). Conning co-produced Laurie Mayer's album Black Lining (2006). He remastered the Lines' catalogue which was re-released on Acute Records in late 2007. The Lines released an album Hull Down, on Acute Records in 2016.

More recently, he has created albums with French musician Arnold Turboust. He also produced Book of Shame's album, Killing Pickle (2018).

Rico Conning British Musician and Producer
