= Torch Song (band) =

British electronic, ambient band

Torch Song were a British electronic and ambient band of the early 1980s. Original members were William Orbit, Laurie Mayer and Grant Gilbert. By 1985 they had disbanded.

The band re-formed the project in 1995 and recorded their final album, Toward the Unknown Region, and were joined by Rico Conning, who had produced artists at the original Guerilla Studios and also was a member of post-punk band, the Lines.

== Discography ==
=== Studio albums ===
- Wish Thing (1984)
- Ecstasy (1986)
- Exhibit A (1987)
- Toward the Unknown Region (1995)

=== Singles ===
- "Prepare to Energize" (1983)
- "Don't Look Now" (1984)
- "Tattered Dress" (1985)
- "Ode to Billy Joe" (1985)
- "White Night" (1986)
- "Can't Find My Way Home" (1986)
- "Shine on Me" (1995)
