= Strange Cargo Hinterland =

Hinterland

Studio album by Strange Cargo
- Released: 1995
- Genres: Electronic, ambient
- Length: 60:14
- Label: N-Gram Records
- Producer: William Orbit

Strange Cargo chronology
Strange Cargo III (1993)	Hinterland (1995)	The Best of Strange Cargos (1996)

Professional ratings
Review scores
Source	Rating
Allmusic	link

Hinterland is the fifth studio album by electronic instrumentalist William Orbit, which released under the alias Strange Cargo. It is the fourth in a series of similarly themed albums: Strange Cargo, Strange Cargo II, and Strange Cargo III.

== Track listing ==
No.	Title	Length
1.	"Million Town"	5:32
2.	"She Cries Your Name"	5:24
3.	"Montok Point" (with Joe Frank)	7:12
4.	"Hulaville"	6:00
5.	"Kiss of the Bee"	4:10
6.	"El Ninjo"	4:50
7.	"Crimes of the Future"	6:00
8.	"The Name of the Wave"	6:18
9.	"Say Anything"	5:46
10.	"Lost in Blue"	3:18
11.	"Hinterland"	4:11
12.	"The Last Dream of Lucy Mariner"	1:33
Total length:		60:14

== Use in other media ==
"The Name of the Wave" was used in the soundtrack of the documentary Amy (2015) about the late singer-songwriter Amy Winehouse. It is the only track in the film neither by Winehouse herself nor by film composer Antônio Pinto, who scored the film.

"MontokPoint" was used in the soundtrack of the science fiction film "Red Planet".

== Extra links ==
Hinterland at Discogs
