= Coffee & TV =

1999 single by Blur

Single by Blur

from the album 13
- B-side: "Trade Stylee" (remix); "Metal Hip Slop" (remix); "X-Offender" (remix); "Coyote" (remix)
- Released: 28 June 1999
- Recorded: 1998
- Genre: Alternative rock; indie rock; Britpop; indie pop
- Length: 5:58 (album version); 5:18 (single edit); 5:03 (radio edit)
- Label: Food
- Composers: Damon Albarn; Graham Coxon; Alex James; Dave Rowntree
- Lyricist: Graham Coxon
- Producer: William Orbit

Blur singles chronology
"Tender" (1999)	"Coffee & TV" (1999)	"No Distance Left to Run" (1999)

Music video
- "Coffee & TV" on YouTube

"Coffee & TV" is a song by the English rock band Blur, released as the second single from their sixth studio album, 13, on 28 June 1999. It was sung by the guitarist, Graham Coxon, with lyrics describing his struggle with alcoholism. It features an improvised discordant guitar solo.

The video, featuring a sentient milk carton searching for Coxon, was directed by Garth Jennings and won several awards. "Coffee & TV" reached No. 11 in the UK, No. 26 in Ireland and No. 2 in Iceland.

== Writing ==
Along with the rest of 13, Blur recorded "Coffee & TV" in late 1998 with the producer William Orbit. As Blur's main vocalist, Damon Albarn, was struggling to finish it, Coxon wrote and sang the lyrics. He wrote about his struggle with alcoholism, and how after giving up drinking he would relax by watching television, drinking coffee and writing songs. The experience also contributed to his first solo album, The Sky Is Too High. Coxon said the song was "about the idea that you feel like a piece of shit in a crap job, and you want to marry someone and get away from it all".

Coxon played a Fender Telecaster into a Marshall Plexi amplifier, and described the chord shapes as "ridiculous ... They're sort of minor chords going against major chords." He likened the guitar rhythm to Link Wray and Simon & Garfunkel, and cited "Stockholm Syndrome" by Yo La Tengo as the biggest influence. Rolling Stone described "Coffee & TV" as a cross between Pavement and the 1974 Brian Eno album Taking Tiger Mountain.

NME described the guitar solo as "a string of discordant notes, building to a storm of haywire string-bending". Coxon improvised it in one take by "just grabbing the neck and bending", and processed it with effect pedals including tremolo, vibrato and distortion. He expected to replace the solo, but the band loved it when they revisited the song a few days later. Coxon cited the solo as an example of how songs "develop like photographs" and eventually cannot be changed.

== Reception ==
"Coffee & TV" reached No. 11 on the UK singles chart on 4 July 1999. Blur's manager, Chris Morrison, believed it was deprived of a top-10 place after it was confirmed that some sales figures were not recorded. The single edit was included on the 2000 Best Of compilation, and featured on the Cruel Intentions soundtrack.

Piers Martin of NME selected "Coffee & TV" as one of the album's highlights and wrote that it demonstrated that "Graham's a great guitarist and whaddaya know, he's a pretty decent singer". It was also praised by Straw in Melody Maker. The Independent described the solo as one of Coxon's best. In 2017, NME named it the 38th-best of all time, writing: "As fine an example of an anti-guitar solo as you'll hear anywhere ... You don't have to widdle away like Eddie Van Halen to carve out a truly memorable solo."

== Music video ==
The animated milk carton from the music video of "Coffee & TV".

Blur recruited Hammer & Tongs to create the video. It features a sentient milk carton known as "Milky" searching for Coxon, who appears as a missing person's face on its side. Along the way, Milky finds a female strawberry milk carton, who is trodden on by a pedestrian. At the end of the video, the cartons are reunited.

The video won several awards in 1999 and 2000 including Best Video at the NME Awards and the MTV Europe Awards. In 2002, the video was ranked the fourth-best by VH1. In 2005, it was voted the 17th greatest pop video in a poll by Channel 4. In 2006, Stylus Magazine ranked it No. 32 in their list of the Top 100 Music Videos of All Time. NME ranked it the 20th-greatest music video of all time. The video received heavy rotation on MTV in the US.

The model of Milky, as used in the video, was sold at an auction of Blur memorabilia in 1999. When Blur played at the London 2012 Olympics Closing Concert Celebration at Hyde Park, fans who bought a Blur T-shirt on the day were given a free replica milk carton of Milky.

== Track listings ==
All music was written and composed by Albarn, Coxon, James and Rowntree. "Coffee & TV" lyrics were composed by Coxon. "Tender" lyrics were composed by Albarn and Coxon. "Bugman" lyrics were composed by Albarn.

UK CD1

1. "Coffee & TV"
2. "Trade Stylee" (Alex's Bugman remix)
3. "Metal Hip Slop" (Graham's Bugman remix)

UK CD2

1. "Coffee & TV"
2. "X-Offender" (Damon / Control Freak's Bugman remix)
3. "Coyote" (Dave's Bugman remix)

UK cassette single

1. "Coffee & TV"
2. "X-Offender" (Damon / Control Freak's Bugman remix)

UK 12-inch single

A1. "Coffee & TV" – 5:19
A2. "Trade Stylee" (Alex's Bugman remix) – 5:59
A3. "Metal Hip Slop" (Graham's Bugman remix) – 4:27
B1. "X-Offender" (Damon / Control Freak's Bugman remix) – 5:42
B2. "Coyote" (Dave's Bugman remix) – 3:48

European CD single

1. "Coffee & TV"
2. "Trade Stylee" (Alex's Bugman remix)
3. "Metal Hip Slop" (Graham's Bugman remix)
4. "Coyote" (Dave's Bugman remix)
5. "X-Offender" (Damon / Control Freak's Bugman remix)

Japanese mini-album CD

1. "Coffee & TV" (UK radio edit)
2. "Tender" (Cornelius remix)
3. "Bugman"
4. "Trade Stylee" (Alex's Bugman remix)
5. "Metal Hip Slop" (Graham's Bugman remix)
6. "Coyote" (Dave's Bugman remix)
7. "X-Offender" (Damon / Control Freak's Bugman remix)

== Personnel ==
- Graham Coxon – lead and backing vocals, electric guitars
- Damon Albarn – keyboards, acoustic guitar, backing vocals
- Alex James – bass guitar
- Dave Rowntree – drums, percussion

== Charts ==
=== Weekly charts ===
Chart (1999)	Peak position
Europe (Eurochart Hot 100)	41
Iceland (Íslenski Listinn Topp 40)	2
Ireland (IRMA)	26
Scottish Singles Sales (Official Charts)	10
UK Singles (Official Charts)	11

Chart (2012)	Peak position
France (SNEP)	178

=== Year-end charts ===
Chart (1999)	Position
UK Singles (OCC)	175

== Certifications ==
Region	Certification	Certified units/sales
United Kingdom (BPI)	Silver	200,000^{‡}
^{‡} Sales+streaming figures based on certification alone.

== Release history ==
Region	Date	Format(s)	Label(s)	Ref.
United Kingdom	28 June 1999	12-inch vinyl; CD; cassette	Food	
Japan	7 July 1999	CD	Parlophone; EMI; Food	
