= Tender (song) =

1999 single by Blur

Single by Blur

from the album 13
- B-side: "All We Want"; "Mellow Jam"; "French Song"
- Released: 17 February 1999
- Recorded: 1998
- Genre: Alternative rock; gospel; country
- Length: 7:40 (album version); 4:30 (radio edit)
- Label: Food
- Composers: Damon Albarn; Graham Coxon; Alex James; Dave Rowntree
- Lyricists: Damon Albarn; Graham Coxon
- Producer: William Orbit

Blur singles chronology
"M.O.R." (1997)	"Tender" (1999)	"Coffee & TV" (1999)

Audio sample
- file; help

Music video
- "Tender" on YouTube

"Tender" is a song by English rock band Blur from their sixth studio album, 13 (1999). Written by the four band members about Blur frontman Damon Albarn's breakup with musician turned painter Justine Frischmann, the song was released in Japan on 17 February 1999 and in the United Kingdom on 22 February as the album's lead single.

"Tender" became Blur's 11th top-10 hit on the UK Singles Chart, debuting and peaking at number two the week after its release. It also reached the top 20 in Greece, Iceland, Ireland, Italy, New Zealand, Norway, and Spain.

== Background, lyric and live performances ==
The song's lyric, by Damon Albarn and Graham Coxon, describes the break-up between Albarn and Justine Frischmann, then the lead singer of Britpop band Elastica. Frischmann told British newspaper The Observer that she cried the first time she heard the song, then felt embarrassed and angered before she calmed down. The writers share the singing, with backing vocals by the London Community Gospel Choir.

"I remember walking into the studio feeling like shit, for reasons I won't go into, and hearing the vocal to 'Tender' and feeling better again. That's the anodyne quality of some music, assuaging your feelings of guilt and horror. Fortunately, we had it nailed early on. And that makes a really big difference when you've got an obvious global number one. That takes the pressure off." – Alex James, bassist

During Coxon's hiatus from the group, Blur continued to perform the song, with Albarn asking audiences to sing Coxon's lines, "Oh my baby/Oh my baby/Oh why?/Oh my". At Blur's headline appearance at the Reading Festival in 2003, he introduced the song by saying: "I don't want, for one moment, to be a sentimental but… Graham wrote this song as well… You know the bits he sings and I want you to sing them as loudly as you possibly can. Everyone needs to sing this song." Drummer Dave Rowntree would also sing Coxon's lines on occasion. In July 2009, when Blur re-formed, Coxon's lines in were repeated powerfully by the audience to call Blur back to the stage at Glastonbury, Hyde Park and T in the Park. At their Wembley Stadium gig of 8 July 2023, the audience kept singing Coxon's lines after the band had finishing performing the song, causing the band to resume playing, along with the audience's singing, for several rounds of the words.

In March 2013, Albarn, Coxon, Paul Weller and Noel Gallagher performed the song at the Teenage Cancer Trust charity event.

== Release and reception ==
It is the first track on Blur's sixth album 13 and was also released as the lead single before the album's release. The single reached number two on the UK Singles Chart. The single had first-week sales of 176,000 and had an initial lead over Spears in the early part of the week, though "...Baby One More Time" would sell an additional 55,000 units over "Tender" to maintain the number one position. The song's release date had been brought forward to challenge a concern over Japanese imports.

The song was awarded "Single of the Fortnight" in Smash Hits, writing: "At seven-and-three-quarter minutes, Tender is at least two too long, but it's still the best skiffle-folk hymn of the year so far!" Chuck Taylor of Billboard called it a "huge departure" for the band and a "stellar piece of work," whose sound is reminiscent of the late-'60s and early-'70s. He wrote: "it's simply a polished, well-produced tip of the hat to a time when British pop stars could sing... and play tinny guitar solos without irony. Sarah Davis of Dotmusic called it a "breath of fresh air" and a "beautiful hymn of consolation," while noting its similarity to "Give Peace a Chance" by John Lennon. "Tender" was nominated in the category of Best British Single at the 2000 BRIT Awards. However, the award was won by Robbie Williams for "She's the One".

== Music video ==
The video for the song is a live studio performance, filmed in black-and-white, featuring the band and a group of backing singers. Like Blur's earlier video for "End of a Century", it does not use the studio version's audio track. An official video for this track was recorded by Sophie Muller (director of the promo videos for "Beetlebum" and "Song 2"), but it was never released as the band simply did not like it.

== B-sides and remixes ==
Initially, the track "Swamp Song" was slated to appear as one of the single's B-sides, but it was only included on the Japanese CD. The appearance of "Song 2" on the second UK CD was a last-minute substitution. A remix of "Tender" by Cornelius was included on the "No Distance Left to Run" single.

== Track listings ==
UK CD1

1. "Tender"
2. "All We Want"
3. "Mellow Jam"

UK CD2

1. "Tender"
2. "French Song"
3. "Song 2"
4. "Song 2" (video)

UK cassette and limited-edition 7-inch single

A. "Tender" – 7:41
B. "All We Want" – 4:33

Australian CD single

1. "Tender"
2. "All We Want"
3. "Mellow Jam"
4. "Song 2" (video)

Japanese CD single

1. "Tender"
2. "Swamp Song"
3. "Mellow Jam"
4. "French Song"

== Production credits ==
- "Tender", "Mellow Jam", "French Song" and "Swamp Song" produced by William Orbit
- "All We Want" and "Song 2" produced by Stephen Street
- Damon Albarn – lead vocals, acoustic guitar
- Graham Coxon – electric guitar, co-lead vocals
- Alex James – double bass, backing vocals
- Dave Rowntree – drums, backing vocals
- Additional backing vocals by the London Community Gospel Choir

== Charts ==
=== Weekly charts ===
Chart (1999)	Peak position
Australia (ARIA)	32
Belgium (Ultratip Bubbling Under Flanders)	15
Europe (Eurochart Hot 100)	11
Germany (GfK)	94
Greece (IFPI Greece)	6
Iceland (Íslenski Listinn Topp 40)	4
Ireland (IRMA)	6
Italy (Musica e dischi)	11
Italy Airplay (Music & Media)	1
Netherlands (Single Top 100)	90
New Zealand (Recorded Music NZ)	12
Norway (VG-lista)	15
Scottish Singles Sales (Official Charts)	2
Spain (AFYVE)	5
Sweden (Sverigetopplistan)	29
Switzerland (Schweizer Hitparade)	45
UK Singles (Official Charts)	2

=== Year-end charts ===
Chart (1999)	Position
UK Singles (OCC)	39
UK Airplay (Music Week)	39

== Certifications ==
Region	Certification	Certified units/sales
United Kingdom (BPI)	Platinum	600,000^{‡}
^{‡} Sales+streaming figures based on certification alone.

== Release history ==
Region	Date	Format(s)	Label(s)	Ref.
Japan	17 February 1999	CD	Food; EMI; Parlophone	
United Kingdom	22 February 1999	CD; cassette	Food	
United Kingdom	1 March 1999	7-inch vinyl	Food	

== In popular culture ==
In December 2017, a cover version of the song featured in a Christmas advert for Co-op. The song also appeared in season 3, episode 3 of the Netflix series Sex Education. An edited version of the song appeared in Aftersun, the soundtrack earning a nomination for Best Music Supervision at the British Independent Film Awards.
