= Strange Cargo (William Orbit album) =

Studio album by William Orbit
- Released: 2 November 1987
- Genres: Electronic, synth-pop, synth-rock, ambient, downtempo
- Length: 37:39
- Label: I.R.S. No Speak
- Producer: William Orbit

William Orbit chronology
Orbit (1987)	Strange Cargo (1987)	Strange Cargo II (1990)

Strange Cargo is the second album by the English musician William Orbit, released on 2 November 1987. It is the first in a series of similarly titled albums: Strange Cargo II, Strange Cargo III, and Strange Cargo Hinterland. Its initial release was accompanied by a short liner note by Miles Copeland.

== Critical reception ==
Professional ratings
Review scores
Source	Rating
AllMusic	2/5 stars
The Encyclopedia of Popular Music	4/5 stars
The Philadelphia Inquirer	2/4 stars

The Philadelphia Inquirer called the album "well-played but rather dull," with a few "occasionally witty compositions." Trouser Press wrote that, "mostly urgent and kinetic, with colorful sound effects, the unresolved semi-songs are mood-heavy and suggest a number of visual idioms, including action-adventure, comedy, espionage and mystery."

== Track listing ==
No.	Title	Length
1.	"Via Caliente"	2:35
2.	"Fire and Mercy"	5:10
3.	"Jump Jet"	2:08
4.	"Silent Signals"	5:56
5.	"The Secret Garden"	3:36
6.	"Out of the Ice"	3:20
7.	"Scorpion"	2:05
8.	"Riding to Rio"	3:02
9.	"Jimmy's Jag"	3:26
10.	"The Mighty Limpopo"	4:18
11.	"Theme Dream"	2:03
Total length:		37:39
