= Strange Cargo 2 =

Studio album by William Orbit
- Released: 1990
- Genre: Electronic
- Length: 46:17
- Label: I.R.S.
- Producer: William Orbit

William Orbit chronology
Strange Cargo (1987)	Strange Cargo 2 (1990)	Strange Cargo III (1993)

Strange Cargo 2 is the third album by electronic instrumentalist William Orbit. It was released in 1990. The album is the second in a series of similarly titled albums: Strange Cargo, Strange Cargo III, and Strange Cargo Hinterland.

== Critical reception ==
Professional ratings
Review scores
Source	Rating
AllMusic	2.5/5 stars

The Chicago Tribune called the album "a mix of light jazz, funk and a smattering of world music to make it all seem somehow exotic."

AllMusic wrote that "though there's a bit more electronics on this record, [Orbit] still seems uncommonly fixated with textural touches like Spanish guitar, and the effect is much more Windham Hill than Warp."

== Track listing ==
No.	Title	Length
1.	"Dark Eyed Kid"	5:21
2.	"Atom Dream"	4:02
3.	"Ruby Heart"	5:55
4.	"El Santo"	4:36
5.	"Dia Del Muerto"	4:28
6.	"777"	3:43
7.	"The Thief and the Serpent"	2:27
8.	"The Last Lagoon"	4:17
9.	"Millennium"	8:15
10.	"Painted Rock"	3:13
Total length:		46:17
