= No Distance Left to Run =

1999 single by Blur

- CDS cover

Single by Blur

from the album 13
- B-side: "Beagle 2"
- Released: 15 November 1999
- Recorded: 1998
- Genre: Alternative rock, art rock
- Length: 3:27
- Label: EMI, Food Records
- Composers: Damon Albarn, Graham Coxon, Alex James, Dave Rowntree
- Lyricist: Damon Albarn
- Producer: William Orbit

Blur singles chronology
"Coffee & TV" (1999)	"No Distance Left to Run" (1999)	"Music Is My Radar" (2000)

Alternative cover
- Enhanced CD cover

Music video
- "No Distance Left to Run" on YouTube

"No Distance Left to Run" is a song by English rock band Blur from their sixth studio album, 13 (1999). It was released as the third and final single from the album on 15 November 1999, reaching number 14 on the UK Singles Chart. It is widely understood to refer to Blur vocalist Damon Albarn's split from long-term partner Justine Frischmann.

== Music and lyrics ==
Damon Albarn says that he is affected by this song: "It upsets me, that song. It upset me singing it. Doing that vocal upset me greatly. To sing that lyric I really had to accept that that was the end of something in my life. It's amazing when you do have the guts to do that with your work, because it don't half help you." The name of the song is also the title of a documentary about the band, which was released in cinemas in January 2010.

== Music video ==
The promotional video directed by Thomas Vinterberg is notable for using night-vision cameras to capture all four members of the band asleep in their respective beds. A DVD version was also released that featured a short documentary about the making of the video. Alex James reportedly dreamt that he "was in Germany in a karaoke bar. I think I was a leopard for a minute."

== B-sides ==
The B-side "Beagle 2", was sent aboard Beagle 2, an unsuccessful British landing spacecraft that formed part of the European Space Agency's 2003 Mars Express mission. The DVD edition of the single features a video of footage of the Beagle 2 over which plays "Far Out (Beagle 2 remix)", a full band version of a song originally from Parklife, using an outtake from the Parklife sessions.

== Track listing ==
- CD1
1. "No Distance Left To Run" – 3:28
2. "Tender" (Cornelius remix) – 5:23
3. "So You" – 4:14
- Enhanced CD2
1. "No Distance Left To Run" – 3:28
2. "Battle" (UNKLE remix) – 7:15
3. "Beagle 2" – 2:52
4. "No Distance Left To Run" (video)
- Cassette / Promo CD
1. "No Distance Left To Run" – 3:28
2. "Tender" (Cornelius remix) – 5:23
- 12" vinyl
1. "No Distance Left To Run" – 3:28
2. "Tender" (Cornelius remix) – 5:23
3. "Battle" (UNKLE remix) – 7:15
- DVD
1. "No Distance Left To Run" (promotional video)
2. "No Distance Left To Run" (live video)
3. The Making Of No Distance Left To Run
4. "Tender" (live video)
5. "Battle" (live video)
6. Beagle 2 (Space Footage) ("Far Out (Beagle 2 Remix)" soundtracks the space footage)
- European CD
1. "No Distance Left To Run" – 3:28
2. "Tender" (Cornelius remix) – 5:23
3. "Battle" (UNKLE remix) – 7:15
4. "Beagle 2" – 2:52

== Production credits ==
- "No Distance Left to Run" produced by William Orbit
- "So You" and "Beagle 2" produced by Blur
- Damon Albarn: lead vocals, keyboards
- Graham Coxon: guitar, backing vocals
- Alex James: bass guitar
- Dave Rowntree: drums

== Charts ==
Weekly chart performance
Chart (1999–2000)	Peak position
Europe (Eurochart Hot 100)	52
Hungary Airplay (HCRA)	11
Scotland Singles (Official Charts)	16
UK Singles (Official Charts)	14
