= She's So High (Blur song) =

1990 single by Blur

Single by Blur

from the album Leisure
- A-side: "I Know"
- Released: 15 October 1990
- Studio: Battery (Willesden, London)
- Genre: Shoegaze
- Length: 4:45 (album version); 3:49 (edit)
- Label: Food
- Songwriters: Damon Albarn; Graham Coxon; Alex James; Dave Rowntree
- Producers: Steve Lovell; Steve Power

Blur singles chronology
"She's So High" / "I Know" (1990)	"There's No Other Way" (1991)

Music video
- "She's So High" on YouTube

"She's So High" is a song by the English rock band Blur. It was released as a double A-side single with "I Know" on 15 October 1990 as the band's debut single. It is the first track on the band's debut album, Leisure, released in 1991.

== Content ==
The artwork was designed by Mel Ramos and shows a naked woman riding a hippopotamus. An enlarged picture was used almost ten years later to promote the live tour "The Singles Night".

== Music video ==
On the MTV Blurography special of 1996, in which the band members talked about the promotional videos, drummer Dave Rowntree recalled, "The head of our record company, David Balfe, wanted to try his hand at video directing. There were these neon rings suspended from the ceiling by three wires, each with someone holding a wire. He [Balfe] wanted these people to wobble the wires so that the neon rings would move. He kept shouting, 'I haven't seen the definitive wobble yet!'". Lead singer Damon Albarn appeared in a Penguin Books shirt, which has become something of a cult icon.

== Release ==
"She's So High" reached number 48 in the UK Singles Chart. It was named NME's single of the week and was later included on Blur: The Best Of over higher-charting tracks, an indication of its ultimate popularity. It is one of the few tracks from that album that the band have continued to perform live throughout their career.

== Track listing ==
All songs written by Blur.

7" and cassette

1. "She's So High (Edit)" – 3:49
2. "I Know" – 3:31

12"

1. "She's So High (Edit)" – 3:49
2. "Sing" – 6:00
3. "I Know (Extended)" – 6:29

CD

1. "She's So High (Edit)" – 3:49
2. "I Know (Extended)" – 6:29
3. "Down" – 5:56

== Personnel ==
Blur

- Damon Albarn – lead vocals, synthesizers, production on "Sing" and "Down"
- Graham Coxon – guitar, backing vocals, production on "Sing" and "Down"
- Alex James – bass guitar, backing vocals, production on "Sing" and "Down"
- Dave Rowntree – drums, backing vocals, production on "Sing" and "Down"

Additional personnel

- Steve Lovell – production on "She's So High" and "I Know"
- Steve Power – production on "She's So High" and "I Know"

== Charts ==
Chart (1990)	Peak position
UK Singles Chart	48
