= William Orbit =

British musician and record producer (1956–2026)

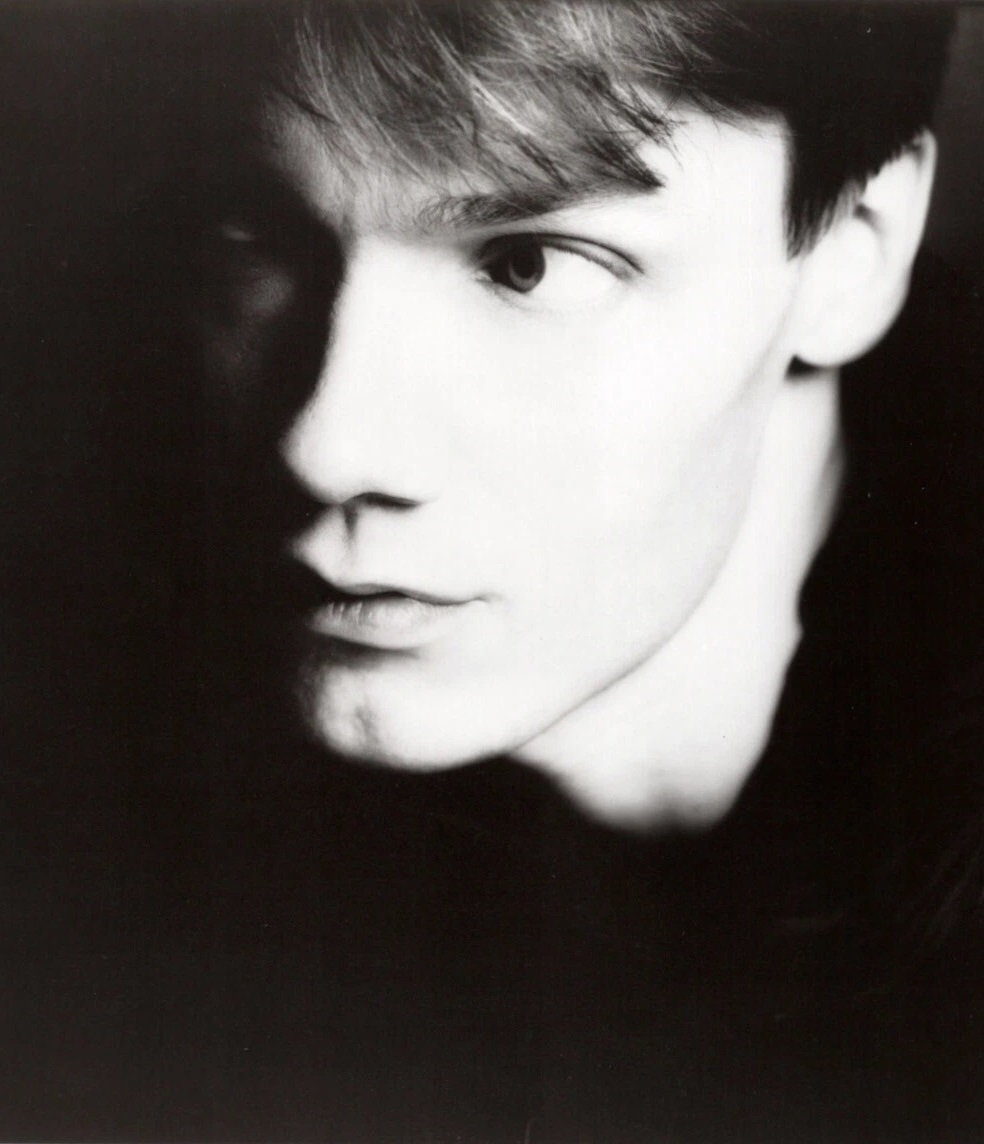
- Orbit, c. 1987

Background information
- Born: William Mark Wainwright; 15 December 1956; Shoreditch, Hackney, London, England
- Origin: Palmers Green, Enfield, London, England
- Died: 23 July 2026 (aged 69) London, England
- Genres: Electronica; techno; house; ambient
- Occupations: Composer; record producer; artist
- Instruments: Keyboards; guitar; percussion
- Years active: 1982–2026
- Labels: I.R.S.; EMI; Virgin; N-GRAM; Maverick; Sanctuary; Kobalt; Decca; Warner Bros.; Guerilla; Anjunadeep
- Website: williamorbit.com

William Mark Wainwright (15 December 1956 – 23 July 2026), nicknamed and known professionally as William Orbit, was an English musician and record producer. With a career spanning four decades, he sold over 200 million recordings worldwide of his own work, his production and song-writing work. Orbit was also a recipient of multiple Grammy Awards, Ivor Novello Awards and other music industry awards.

== Early life ==
Orbit was born William Mark Wainwright on 15 December 1956 and raised in Palmers Green, London, England. His parents were both schoolteachers; he was the elder of two sons. He left school at the age of 16, and subsisted for a number of years in various low-paying jobs, while seeking an outlet for his creativity. Around this time, while rooming with a friend who was trying to start a recording studio, Orbit found his musical calling. His nickname of "Orbit" was given to him by friends because of his love of rocketry and astronomy and also his spacey manner.

== Torch Song and Bassomatic ==
In 1980, Orbit teamed up with electronic musician Laurie Mayer and Grant Gilbert to form the electronic/synth group Torch Song. They released their recordings in an audio cassette series, generated from their home-built studio in a squatted disused school, nicknamed the Centro Iberico, in Notting Hill, in London, next to the Grand Union Canal. Richard Law, who was A&R for IRS Records, was a follower of their music and aesthetic; in 1981, Law took it to Miles Copeland, who had discovered and managed the Police and the Bangles. When Copeland signed them to the label, the deal enabled them to build their ideal studio. There they recorded two albums and four singles, the most successful being the dance chart hit "Prepare to Energize", which was featured in the film Bachelor Party. Orbit and Mayer also composed the soundtrack to the ice hockey movie Youngblood, starring Rob Lowe and Patrick Swayze, and recorded "White Night", written by colleague Rico Conning of The Lines, which was used in The Texas Chainsaw Massacre 2. The band reunited briefly when Orbit worked with Laurie Mayer and Rico Conning. They released their final album, Toward the Unknown Region, in 1995.

This first incarnation of Guerilla Studios had a Trident 80B mixing desk and Otari MTR90 MKII 24 track (2 inch tape) multitrack housed in a back garden on the canals of Little Venice in Paddington, and they also ran it as a commercial enterprise.

Bassomatic was another of Orbit's group projects. The band recorded house music in the 1990s. The band included vocalist Sharon Musgrave and rapper Steve Roberts, also known as MC Inna Onestep among others. For the second album, singer Sindy Finn replaced Musgrave on vocals. Both albums were released by Guerilla Studios, founded by Orbit with Laurie Mayer and Grant Gilbert. Bassomatic's first album was 1990's Set the Controls for the Heart of the Bass, the title track derived from Pink Floyd's "Set the Controls for the Heart of the Sun". This album was re-released in 1997. A subsequent album, Science and Melody, was released in 1991. Bassomatic's biggest hit single was "Fascinating Rhythm" in 1990, which reached No. 9 on the UK Singles Chart, and performed well on the UK Dance Chart.

Around this time, Orbit's studio chiefly consisted of a pair of Akai S1000 samplers and a Roland Juno-106 synthesiser.

In the late 1980s, Orbit began to release solo music under his William Orbit name, with Strange Cargo (1987) beginning a series of instrumental releases of this name. Strange Cargo's liner notes by Miles Copeland III described Orbit as "a studio genius".

== Productions and remixes ==
Collaborations and productions included Madonna, Britney Spears, U2, OMD, Erasure, Beth Orton, Sarah Blackwood, Queen, Robbie Williams, All Saints, Nitzer Ebb, Kraftwerk and Sugababes. When working with Beck, the two of them wrote a song for Pink, "Feel Good Time", which Orbit then produced for the soundtrack for the 2003 film Charlie's Angels: Full Throttle.

Orbit had created remixes for Madonna previously such as those of "Justify My Love" and "Erotica" but did not meet her personally until 1997. That summer and autumn, they worked together and produced her multi-Grammy/award-winning seventh album Ray of Light. The album took four months to record and it was the longest she ever spent recording an album. It was released on 22 February 1998.

In 1998, he spent several months working with the British group Blur in London and Reykjavík, Iceland. The band's album 13, produced by Orbit and featuring the singles "Tender" and "Coffee & TV" was released the following year.

In 2000, Orbit continued working for Madonna on her album Music, recorded at The Hit Factory in New York. At this time, he also co-wrote and performed with her on the song "Beautiful Stranger".

In 2011, he worked with a team of writers including Jean-Baptiste Kouame, Julie Frost and Klas Ahlund and brought their compositions and his production work to contribute to the twelfth studio album by Madonna, MDNA, released on 23 March 2012, by Interscope Records. He co-produced 6 tracks on the album, including "Masterpiece" which won a Golden Globe for Best Original Song in the Miramax film W.E., at the 69th Golden Globe Awards. After the release of the album, Orbit openly expressed in various media sources his dissatisfaction and disappointment with this Madonna project.

In 2013, Orbit worked with Britney Spears and will.i.am on the album Britney Jean, with fellow songwriters Ana Diaz and Dan Traynor with whom he wrote and produced the track "Alien". He was one of the writers and one of the producers on the Chris Brown song "Don't Wake Me Up" which was recorded at Record Plant in LA and for which he received an ASCAP award in 2013.

This was followed by a production of the Queen track "There Must Be More to Life Than This", which featured archive vocals by Freddie Mercury and Michael Jackson. Orbit went on to produce another Queen song, "Let Me in Your Heart Again". In 2015, his composition "The Name of the Wave" was used in the Oscar winning documentary Amy directed by Asif Kapadia.

In 2018, he worked on "After All", a song by English-Canadian girl group All Saints from their fifth studio album, Testament (2018). Written by group member Shaznay Lewis along with Peter Hutchings and Orbit, whilst produced by the latter, it was released as the album's second single on 26 July 2018.

=== Classical work ===
Inspired and encouraged by music executive Rob Dickins, Orbit's first commercial release in the classical sphere was Pieces in a Modern Style. It was originally released in May 1995 on Orbit's N-Gram Recordings label, and then again in 2000 by Warner Music in the UK and Europe, and on Maverick in the U.S. The album reached No 2 in the UK album charts. The first single release from the album was Barber's Adagio for Strings, and a trance remix of the track by Dutch DJ Ferry Corsten was hugely successful. The single reached number 4 in the UK singles chart. In 2010 he teamed with Rico Conning and Laurie Mayer to make a follow-up album, Pieces in a Modern Style 2, which was released as a two-disc set on the Decca label. The album featured German countertenor Andreas Scholl on an interpretation of Henry Purcell's "Dido's Lament".

In 2007, he took part in Alex Poots's Manchester International Festival, and composed a symphonic work in nine movements, "Orchestral Suite" which was performed by the BBC Philharmonic Orchestra, augmented by additional harps, pianos and percussion, and with The Manchester Chorale, conducted by Alexander Shelley at Bridgewater Hall.

== Live performance/media/DJ work and later career ==
In the early '90s, Orbit briefly developed a new label which he called N'Gram. During the N'Gram period, he co-directed a showcase of the label at Queen Elizabeth Hall on London's Southbank. The acts included The Electric Chamber (which performed the Pieces album), Strange Cargo, and Torch Song. In 2001, he took part in the Stockhausen Electronic Festival at the Barbican Theatre. In 2013, he took part in the London Electronic Arts Festival.

In 2015, he performed at a gala at Banqueting House in London's Whitehall for the charity Together for Short Lives, a group that sponsors and supports children with terminal illnesses and their families. Orbit has deejayed at various clubs in London and Ibiza, and at Buckingham Palace for Elizabeth II's annual staff and family Christmas party, in 2015. In 2021 Orbit said he had been sectioned in 2020 after having a mental breakdown.

Orbit released an EP in 2021 title Starbeam, and then followed that up with an album titled The Painter, in 2022—the title reflecting his having taken up painting.

Orbit joined Hawkwind on stage on 29 September 2023 at the Royal Albert Hall to celebrate the 50th anniversary of their Space Ritual album. His last public appearances included events at two London venues, the Notting Hill Arts Club on 29 September 2025 and The Lower Third on 29 March 2026.

== Death ==
Orbit died at his home in London on 23 July 2026, aged 69. His death was announced in a statement by his family on his website and Instagram page on 7 August.

Following the announcement of his death, Madonna paid tribute to Orbit, recalling their creative partnership during the making of Ray of Light. She credited him with helping her move beyond conventional musical genres and said his music enabled her to sing and write in new ways. Madonna described Orbit as "otherworldly" and "singular", with a "genius way of hearing music", and specifically credited him with inspiring her to write the songs "Drowned World/Substitute for Love" and "Swim". She recalled their time working together as a "magical time" and expressed her gratitude for having known him. Other people who also collaborated with Orbit such as Mel C and Merck Mercuriadis also paid tribute to him, the former writing that it was "such an honour to have worked with this great man".

== Solo discography ==
=== Studio albums ===
| Year | Album | Chart positions | | |
| Year | Album | UK | AUS | US |
|---|---|---|---|---|
| 1987 | Orbit: Labels: I.R.S. | — | — | — |
| 1987 | Strange Cargo: Labels: I.R.S. | — (Note: "Strange Cargo" did not enter the UK Albums Chart, but debuted at number 73 on the UK Albums Downloads chart, 29 years after the original release, following Orbit's July 2026 death.) | — | — |
| 1990 | Strange Cargo II: Labels: I.R.S. | — | — | — |
| 1993 | Strange Cargo III: Labels: Virgin | — | — | — |
| 1995 | Strange Cargo Hinterland: Labels: N-GRAM, Warner Music UK | — | — | — |
| 1999 | Pieces in a Modern Style ^{[A]}: Labels: N-GRAM (1995 release), WEA (2000 release) | 2 | 33 | 198 |
| 2006 | Hello Waveforms: Label: Sanctuary | 136 | — | — |
| 2009 | My Oracle Lives Uptown ^{[B]}: Label: Kobalt | — | — | — |
| 2010 | Pieces in a Modern Style 2 ^{[C]}: Label: Decca | 185 | — | — |
| 2014 | Orbit Symphonic ^{[D]}: Label: – | — | — | — |
| 2014 | Strange Cargo 5 ^{[D]}: Label: – | — | — | — |
| 2022 | The Painter: Label: Rhino | — | — | — |

- A The original 1995 release was credited to the Orbit alias 'The Electric Chamber', but was withdrawn from sale almost immediately. Re-released in 2000 with additional tracks taking the place of un-cleared tracks from the first release.
- B CD release has four additional tracks which are not available as a digital download
- C Released on single CD and double CD including notable remixes, and a digital version with a bonus track
- D Available for free download from SoundCloud

=== Compilations ===
- The Best of Strange Cargos (1996, I.R.S.) – A compilation from Orbit's first three Strange Cargo albums, highlighted by two versions of "Water From A Vine Leaf", another collaboration with Beth Orton
- Strange Cargo Vol. 1–3 (2000, EMI Records) – 3-CD Box Set
- William / Orbit (2002, Universal) – U.S. two-disc publishing CD set to support William Orbit's publishing catalogue

=== Singles ===
| Year | Title | Chart positions | | | Certification | Album |
| Year | Title | UK | AUS | US DC/P | Certification | Album |
|---|---|---|---|---|---|---|
| 1987 | "Feel Like Jumping" | — | — | — | | Orbit |
| 1987 | "Love My Way" | — | — | — | | Orbit |
| 1993 | "Water from a Vine Leaf" (featuring Beth Orton) | 59 | — | — | | Strange Cargo III |
| 1999 | "Barber's Adagio for Strings" | 4 | 23 | 13 | | Pieces in a Modern Style |
| 2000 | "Ravel's Pavane Pour Une Infante Defunte" | 31 | — | — | | Pieces in a Modern Style |
| 2003 | "Feel Good Time" (Pink featuring William Orbit) | 3 | 7 | 8 | ARIA: Gold | Charlie's Angels: Full Throttle (OST) |
| 2003 | "Dice" (with Finley Quaye) | — | — | — | | Much More Than Much Love (Finley Quaye album) |
| 2009 | "Optical Illusions" | — | — | — | | My Oracle Lives Uptown |
| 2009 | "Purdy" | — | — | — | | My Oracle Lives Uptown |
| 2010 | "Nimrod" | — | — | — | | Pieces in a Modern Style 2 |

== Ensemble discography ==
=== With Bassomatic ===
| Year | Album |
|---|---|
| 1990 | Set the Controls for the Heart of the Bass: Labels: Virgin Records |
| 1991 | Science & Melody: Labels: Virgin |

=== With Torch Song ===
| Year | Album |
|---|---|
| 1984 | Wish Thing: Labels: I.R.S. Records |
| 1986 | Ecstasy: Labels: Y II Records |
| 1987 | Exhibit A: Labels: I.R.S. |
| 1995 | Toward the Unknown Region: Labels: N-GRAM Recordings |

== Production and songwriting credits ==
| Title | Year | Artist(s) | Album | Ref |
|---|---|---|---|---|
| "24 Hours" | 1990 | Betty Boo | Boomania | |
| "Don't Wanna Know 'Bout Evil" | 1993 | Beth Orton | Superpinkymandy | |
| "Faith Will Carry" | 1993 | Beth Orton | Superpinkymandy | |
| "Yesterday's Gone" | 1993 | Beth Orton | Superpinkymandy | |
| "She Cries Your Name" | 1993 | Beth Orton | Superpinkymandy | |
| "When You Wake" | 1993 | Beth Orton | Superpinkymandy | |
| "Roll the Dice" | 1993 | Beth Orton | Superpinkymandy | |
| "City Blue" | 1993 | Beth Orton | Superpinkymandy | |
| "The Prisoner" | 1993 | Beth Orton | Superpinkymandy | |
| "Where Do You Go" | 1993 | Beth Orton | Superpinkymandy | |
| "Release Me" | 1993 | Beth Orton | Superpinkymandy | |
| "Turning Ground" | 1995 | Caroline Lavelle | Spirit | |
| "Moorlough Shore" | 1995 | Caroline Lavelle | Spirit | |
| "Dream of Picasso" | 1995 | Caroline Lavelle | Spirit | |
| "Forget the Few" | 1995 | Caroline Lavelle | Spirit | |
| "Lagan Love" | 1995 | Caroline Lavelle | Spirit | |
| "A Case of You" | 1995 | Caroline Lavelle | Spirit | |
| "Waiting For Rain" | 1995 | Caroline Lavelle | Spirit | |
| "Desire" | 1995 | Caroline Lavelle | Spirit | |
| "The Island" | 1995 | Caroline Lavelle | Spirit | |
| "Drowned World/Substitute for Love" | 1998 | Madonna | Ray of Light | |
| "Swim" | 1998 | Madonna | Ray of Light | |
| "Ray of Light" | 1998 | Madonna | Ray of Light | |
| "Candy Perfume Girl" | 1998 | Madonna | Ray of Light | |
| "Skin" | 1998 | Madonna | Ray of Light | |
| "Nothing Really Matters" | 1998 | Madonna | Ray of Light | |
| "Sky Fits Heaven" | 1998 | Madonna | Ray of Light | |
| "Shanti/Ashtangi" | 1998 | Madonna | Ray of Light | |
| "Frozen" | 1998 | Madonna | Ray of Light | |
| "The Power of Good-Bye" | 1998 | Madonna | Ray of Light | |
| "To Have and Not to Hold" | 1998 | Madonna | Ray of Light | |
| "Mer Girl" | 1998 | Madonna | Ray of Light | |
| "Has to Be" | 1998 | Madonna | Ray of Light | |
| "Tender" | 1999 | Blur | 13 | |
| "Bugman" | 1999 | Blur | 13 | |
| "Coffee & TV" | 1999 | Blur | 13 | |
| "Swamp Song" | 1999 | Blur | 13 | |
| "1992" | 1999 | Blur | 13 | |
| "B.L.U.R.E.M.I." | 1999 | Blur | 13 | |
| "Battle" | 1999 | Blur | 13 | |
| "Mellow Song" | 1999 | Blur | 13 | |
| "Caramel" | 1999 | Blur | 13 | |
| "Trimm Trabb" | 1999 | Blur | 13 | |
| "No Distance Left to Run" | 1999 | Blur | 13 | |
| "Optigan 1" | 1999 | Blur | 13 | |
| "Be Careful (Cuidado Con Mi Corazón)" | 1999 | Ricky Martin and Madonna | Ricky Martin | |
| "Beautiful Stranger" | 1999 | Madonna | Austin Powers: The Spy Who Shagged Me | |
| "Go!" | 1999 | Melanie C | Northern Star | |
| "American Pie" | 2000 | Madonna | The Next Best Thing | |
| "Time Stood Still" | 2000 | Madonna | The Next Best Thing | |
| "Runaway Lover" | 2000 | Madonna | Music | |
| "Amazing" | 2000 | Madonna | Music | |
| "Gone" | 2000 | Madonna | Music | |
| "Pure Shores" | 2000 | All Saints | Saints & Sinners | |
| "Dreams" | 2000 | All Saints | Saints & Sinners | |
| "Black Coffee" | 2000 | All Saints | Saints & Sinners | |
| "Surrender" | 2000 | All Saints | Saints & Sinners | |
| "Making Out" | 2001 | No Doubt | Rock Steady | |
| "Thinking About Tomorrow" | 2002 | Beth Orton | Daybreaker | |
| "Electrical Storm" | 2002 | U2 | The Best of 1990–2000 | |
| "The Hands That Built America" (Theme from Gangs of New York) | 2002 | U2 | The Best of 1990–2000 | |
| "Sweet Song" | 2003 | Blur | Think Tank | |
| "Feel Good Time" | 2003 | Pink | Charlie's Angels: Full Throttle | |
| "Dice" | 2004 | Finley Quaye | Much More Than Much Love | |
| "Louise" | 2006 | Robbie Williams | Rudebox | |
| "Summertime" | 2006 | Robbie Williams | Rudebox | |
| "I'd Love to Kill You" | 2010 | Katie Melua | The House | |
| "The Flood" | 2010 | Katie Melua | The House | |
| "A Happy Place" | 2010 | Katie Melua | The House | |
| "A Moment of Madness" | 2010 | Katie Melua | The House | |
| "Red Balloons" | 2010 | Katie Melua | The House | |
| "Tiny Alien" | 2010 | Katie Melua | The House | |
| "No Fear of Heights" | 2010 | Katie Melua | The House | |
| "The One I Love Is Gone" | 2010 | Katie Melua | The House | |
| "Plague of Love" | 2010 | Katie Melua | The House | |
| "God on the Drums, Devil on the Bass" | 2010 | Katie Melua | The House | |
| "Twisted" | 2010 | Katie Melua | The House | |
| "The House" | 2010 | Katie Melua | The House | |
| "Unbroken" | 2010 | Nadine Coyle | Insatiable | |
| "Gang Bang" | 2012 | Madonna | MDNA | |
| "Some Girls" | 2012 | Madonna | MDNA | |
| "I'm a Sinner" | 2012 | Madonna | MDNA | |
| "Love Spent" | 2012 | Madonna | MDNA | |
| "Masterpiece" | 2012 | Madonna | MDNA | |
| "Falling Free" | 2012 | Madonna | MDNA | |
| "Don't Wake Me Up" | 2012 | Chris Brown | Fortune | |
| "Alien" | 2013 | Britney Spears | Britney Jean | |
| "There Must Be More to Life Than This" | 2014 | Queen and Michael Jackson | Queen Forever | |
| "Let Me in Your Heart Again" (remix) | 2014 | Queen | Queen Forever | |
| "After All" | 2018 | All Saints | Testament | |
| "Testament in Motion" | 2018 | All Saints | Testament | |

== Awards and nominations ==
| Award | Year | Nominee(s) | Category | Result | Ref. |
|---|---|---|---|---|---|
| Grammy Awards | 1999 | Ray of Light | Album of the Year | Nominated | |
| Grammy Awards | 1999 | Ray of Light | Best Pop Album | Won | |
| Grammy Awards | 1999 | "Ray of Light" | Record of the Year | Nominated | |
| Grammy Awards | 1999 | "Ray of Light" | Best Dance Recording | Won | |
| Grammy Awards | 2000 | "Beautiful Stranger" | Best Song Written for Visual Media | Won | |
| Grammy Awards | 2001 | Pieces in a Modern Style | Best Pop Instrumental Album | Nominated | |
| Grammy Awards | 2004 | "Feel Good Time" (with Pink) | Best Pop Collaboration with Vocals | Nominated | |
| International Dance Music Awards | 2000 | Himself | Best Producer | Won | |
| Online Music Awards | 1999 | williamorbit.com/orbit | Best Electronic Fansite | Nominated | |
