= Laurie Mayer (songwriter) =

American born composer and songwriter (born 1961)

Laurie Mayer (born 1961) is an American-born songwriter who has spent much of her musical career in the UK. She majored in both music and fine art at the University of California, Los Angeles before relocating to London. She was part of the group Torch Song.

== Career ==
During the 1980s and 1990s, she was part of the group Torch Song. The band released four albums: Wish Thing, Ecstasy, Exhibit A, and Toward the Unknown Region. Together they ran Guerilla Studios, with Rico Conning as the in-house sound engineer. Conning was also a member of the Lines, a UK post-punk band.

She worked with Etienne Daho on his albums Pop Satori and Pour nos vies martiennes. During that time, she released an EP, Bright Blue Night. The title track was covered as "Le seul cœur que je brise" by the Daho produced version recorded by Belgian pop artist Lio.

Mayer released a solo album, Black Lining in 2006, which was co-produced and co-written by Rico Conning.

The song "Falling Free" on Madonna's MDNA album (2012) was co-written by Mayer, Madonna, Joe Henry and Madonna's producer.

In 2009, she co-authored the book The Way We Were California: Nostalgic Images of the Golden State with M.J. Howard.

In 2022, she released a collection of new work, Under Gold Dust and Heat, containing four songs that were co-produced by Rico Conning.
