= List of jazz trombonists =

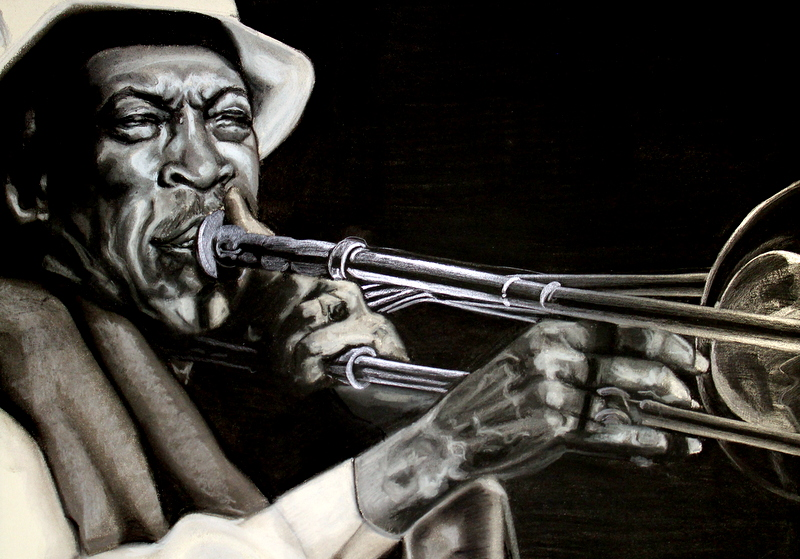
Trombonist Al Grey in a 2015 painting by Gwendolyn Lanier-Gardner

This is an alphabetical list of jazz trombonists for whom Wikipedia has articles.

== A–B ==
- Ray Anderson (born 1952)
- Troy Andrews (Trombone Shorty; born 1987)
- David Baker (1931–2016)
- Dan Barrett (born 1955)
- Lucien Barbarin (1956–2020)
- Chris Barber (1930–2021)
- Conny Bauer (born 1943)
- Johannes Bauer (1954–2016)
- Eddie Bert (1922–2012)
- Harold Betters (1928–2020)
- Jeb Bishop (born 1962)
- Big Bill Bissonnette (1937–2018)
- Bert Boeren (born 1962)
- George Bohanon (born 1937)
- Luis Bonilla (born 1965)
- Richard B. Boone (1930–1999)
- Joseph Bowie (born 1953)
- Tom Brantley (born 1970)
- Bob Brookmeyer (valve trombone, 1929–2011)
- Garnett Brown (1936–2021)
- Lawrence Brown (1907–1988)
- Marshall Brown (1920–1983)
- Tom Brown (1888–1958)
- George Brunies (1902–1974)
- Papa Bue (1930–2011)
- Billy Byers (1927–1996)

== C–F ==
- Gordon Campbell
- Jimmy Cheatham (1924–2007)
- George Chisholm (1915–1997)
- Emile Christian (1895–1973)
- Jimmy Cleveland (1926–2008)
- Marty Cook (born 1947)
- Michael Conner
- Willie Cornish (1875–1942)
- Hal Crook (born 1950)
- Elmer Crumbley (1908–1993)
- Michael Davis (born 1961)
- Steve Davis (born 1967)
- Raul de Souza (1934–2021)
- Michael Dease (born 1982)
- Willie Dennis (1926–1965)
- Vic Dickenson (1906–1984)
- Tommy Dorsey (1905–1956)
- Don Drummond (1932–1969)
- Billy Eckstine (musician and singer) (1914–1993)
- Eddie Edwards (1891–1963)
- Bob Enevoldsen (1920–2005)
- Robin Eubanks (born 1955)
- Mike Fahn (born 1960)
- John Fedchock (born 1957)
- Glenn Ferris (born 1950)
- Carl Fontana (1928–2008)
- Bruce Fowler (born 1947)
- Curtis Fowlkes (born 1950)
- Hugh Fraser (1958–2020)
- Curtis Fuller (1932–2021)
- Elias Faingersh (born 1967)

== G–L ==
- Robert Gale
- Vincent Gardner (born 1972)
- Clark Gayton (born 1963)
- Matthew Gee (1929–1979)
- Marshall Gilkes (born 1978)
- Tyree Glenn (1912–1974)
- Wycliffe Gordon (born 1967)
- Brad Gowans (1903–1954)
- Bennie Green (1923–1977)
- Charlie Green (1900–1936)
- Urbie Green (1926–2018)
- Al Grey (1925–2000)
- Slide Hampton (1932–2021)
- Bill Harris (1916–1973)
- Craig Harris (born 1953)
- Jimmy Harrison (1900–1931)
- Bob Havens (born 1930)
- Thamon Hayes (1899–1978)
- Wayne Henderson (1939–2014)
- Conrad Herwig (born 1959)
- J. C. Higginbotham (1906–1973)
- Dave Horler (born 1943)
- Bill Hughes
- Walter "Pee Wee" Hunt (1907–1979)
- Quentin Jackson (1909–1976)
- Carol Jarvis (born 1977)
- J. J. Johnson (1924–2001)
- Ward Kimball (1914–2002)
- Craig Klein
- Jimmy Knepper (1927–2003)
- René Laanen (born 1952)
- Frank Lacy (born 1959)
- Nils Landgren (born 1956)
- George E. Lewis (born 1952)
- Melba Liston (1926–1999)
- Frederick Lonzo (born 1950)

== M–P ==
- Radu Malfatti (born 1943)
- Tom "Bones" Malone (born 1947)
- Albert Mangelsdorff (1928–2005)
- Delfeayo Marsalis (born 1965)
- Andy Martin
- Elliot Mason (born 1977)
- Rob McConnell (valve trombone)
- Lou McGarity (1917–1971)
- Clarence Horatius Miller (1922–1992)
- Glenn Miller (1904–1944)
- Grover Mitchell (1930–2003)
- Miff Mole (1898–1961)
- Grachan Moncur III (1937–2022)
- Russ Morgan (1904–1969)
- James Morrison (born 1962)
- Benny Morton (1907–1985)
- Turk Murphy (1915–1987)
- Christian Muthspiel (born 1962)
- Tricky Sam Nanton (1904–1946)
- Dick Nash (born 1928)
- Louis Nelson (1902–1990)
- Sammy Nestico (1924–2021)
- Ed Neumeister (born 1952)
- Mark Nightingale (born 1967)
- Kid Ory (1886–1973)
- Roy Palmer (1887–1963)
- James Pankow
- Frank Parr (1928–2012)
- Tommy Pederson (1920–1988)
- Åke Persson (1932–1975)
- Jim Pugh (born 1950)
- Julian Priester (born 1935)
- Douglas Purviance (born 1952)

== R–T ==
- Frank Rehak (1926–1987)
- Bill Reichenbach (born 1949)
- Ilja Reijngoud (born 1972)
- Nelson Riddle (1921–1985)
- Jimmy Reno (trombonist) (born 1969)
- George Roberts (1928–2014)
- Jim Robinson (1892–1976)
- Rico Rodriguez (1934–2015)
- Barry Rogers (1935–1991)
- Dennis Rollins (born 1964)
- Gabriel Rosati (born 1966)
- Frank Rosolino (1926–1978)
- Roswell Rudd (1935–2017)
- Tony Russell (1929–1970)
- Sonny Russo (1929–2013)
- Louis Satterfield (1937–2004)
- Don Sebesky (born 1937)
- Dick Shearer (1940–1997)
- Even Kruse Skatrud (born 1977)
- Tom Smith (born 1957)
- Pete Strange (1938–2004)
- Hiroshi Suzuki (1933-2020)
- Steve Swell (born 1954)
- Rob Swope (1926–1967)
- Jack Teagarden (1905–1964)
- Aage Teigen (1944–2014)
- Eje Thelin (1938–1990)
- Sebi Tramontana (born 1960)
- Steve Turre (born 1948)

== U–Z ==
- Gary Valente (born 1953)
- Jonathan Voltzok
- Bill Watrous (1939–2018)
- Harry Watters
- Dicky Wells (1907–1985)
- Fred Wesley (born 1943)
- Ron Westray (born 1970)
- Jiggs Whigham (born 1943)
- Annie Whitehead (born 1955)
- Spiegle Willcox (1903–1999)
- Phil Wilson (born 1937)
- Wolter Wierbos (born 1957)
- Steve Wiest (born 1957)
- Vaughn Wiester (born 1945)
- Kai Winding (1922–1983)
- Nils Wogram (born 1972)
- Britt Woodman (1920–2000)
- Trummy Young (1912–1984)
- Jerry Zigmont (born 1956)
