= Key (music) =

Most common pitches in a piece of music

In Western tonal music, a key represents the most common pitches and the center of tonal stability in a song or other composition.

A key has two components: a tonic pitch and a mode. The tonic pitch is represented by a letter from A through G, sometimes modified by the accidental symbols ♯ (sharp) and ♭ (flat). This tonic represents the musical pitch which a piece will be oriented around and almost always conclude with. The mode may be Major or Minor; if no mode is specified, Major is usually implied. (Note: Western music has several other modes, such as Dorian mode and Lydian mode, but these are not used in the names of standard keys.) This mode represents a pattern of ascending or descending pitches, which can create a major or minor musical scale beginning with the tonic pitch. Music in a given key will use the pitches from this scale (called diatonic pitches) more often than the pitches outside it (chromatic pitches). Together, these result in keys with names like C Major, A Minor, and B♭ Major. Not all music has a well-defined key.

Written music typically begins with a key signature. This tells the performer which pitches are diatonic and should be expected most often. However, the key signature does not specify the tonic pitch. Music can be converted from one key into another by raising or lowering all pitches, which is called transposition. Some instruments, like the clarinet and trumpet, are called transposing instruments because they usually require this; music written for these instruments will be offset from what the performer actually plays. Since the same musical patterns are found across different keys, musical chords are often expressed as numbers based on where their lowest pitches fall in a given scale. This allows common chord patterns to be easily transposed and analyzed independently from a song's key.

Relationships between keys can be visualized with a diagram called the Circle of Fifths. This diagram shows which keys share the majority of pitches with each other and which have minimal overlap. It also shows the relationships between major keys and their relative minors (which contains the same pitches but a different tonic pitch), and the pitch differences between keys with the same tonic but different modes. When two keys are closely related, it is easier to transition between them—a process called modulation.

== Background ==
Music is made from audible vibrations, such as from oscillating strings or air moving through reeds. People generally perceive some vibrations as sounding "higher" or "lower" than others, creating a subjective perception called pitch. As a medium vibrates faster, this higher frequency of vibration is perceived as higher pitch. In standard Western tonal music, specific frequencies are grouped into twelve pitch classes. Seven of these are considered "natural" pitches and represented by the letters A, B, C, D, E, F, and G.

Humans perceive frequencies logarithmically, not linearly. In other words, the ratio between two frequencies, rather than the absolute difference between them, determines how different they sound. If one vibration has twice the frequency of another, both sound similar and are considered the same pitch class. The distance between the two is called an octave. For clarity, these pitches are sometimes labeled with numbers. For example, the lowest C playable on a standard piano is C1, while the pitch with twice the frequency (one octave higher) is C2. (Note: The exact relationship between frequency and pitch has varied in different places and times. Today, international standard concert pitch defines the pitch A4 as the frequency 440 Hertz. Other pitches can be mathematically derived from this baseline.)

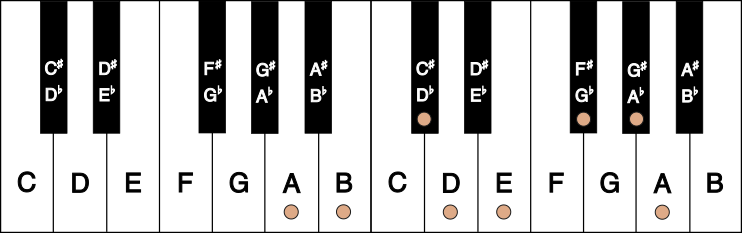
On a piano, the seven natural pitches are played with white keys. The black keys play intermediate pitches notated with the symbols ♯ and ♭. The musical distance between adjacent keys is one semitone. A Major Scale begins and ends on a starting pitch, called the Tonic, and follows a pattern of semitone and whole tone steps. In this diagram, the dots represent the seven pitches of the Major scale starting from A, the basis for the key of A Major.

On a piano, each white key represents one of the seven "natural" pitches. These are arranged from A to G, followed by another A one octave higher. Among these pitches, the relative increases in frequency from B to C and from E to F are smaller than the changes between other adjacent pitches. This smaller distance is called a semitone, while the larger distance (e.g. from A to B) is a whole tone. When two natural pitches are a whole tone apart, an intermediate pitch is placed between them—on a piano, these are represented by the smaller black keys. Instead of using separate letters, these intermediate pitches are denoted with the accidentals ♯ (sharp) and ♭ (flat), which represent raising or lowering a natural pitch by one semitone. The pitch between G and A may be denoted as either G♯ (G plus one semitone) or A♭ (A minus one semitone). These two ways of representing the same sound are called enharmonically equivalent.

Most Western music is built around major and minor scales. These scales use seven of the twelve pitches, arranged in ascending or descending order, and beginning and ending with the same pitch one octave apart. An ascending major scale moves between pitches with the pattern tone, tone, semitone, tone, tone, tone, semitone. (Note: The major pentatonic scale is a subset of the major scale. It excludes the fourth and seventh pitches, so all five remaining pitches are at least a whole tone apart.) An ascending minor scale instead uses the pattern tone, semitone, tone, tone, semitone, tone, tone, which results in the third, sixth, and seventh pitches being one semitone lower compared to the major scale. (Note: Minor keys are often considered sadder or darker than major keys.) A major scale beginning from C and a minor scale beginning from A each contain only natural pitches, and on a piano will use exclusively white keys; the two scales are considered distinct "modes" of the same set of pitches. In contrast, a major scale beginning from A uses the pitches A, B, C♯, D, E, F♯, G♯, A. (Note: Scales are written using each letter from A through G, and without intermixing ♯ and ♭ accidentals. The pitch between C and D could be written D♭ instead of C♯, but it would be incorrect to write this scale as A, B, D♭, D, E, F♯, G♯, A.) The pitch on which a given scale begins and ends is called its tonic.

== Definition ==
A key is a way to classify a piece of music as being oriented around a Major or Minor scale. The name of a key, such as A Major, contains both a Tonic pitch and a Mode (either Major or Minor). Since there are 12 pitches which may be used as a tonic, there are 24 distinct keys. (Note: Although there are only 24 possible keys, there are more than 24 possible key names. For example, C♯ Major and D♭ Major are equivalent names for the same key.) If the mode is not specified, a generic term like "the key of C" generally implies a major key.

If a piece of music is in a key, it will mostly use pitches from the corresponding scale. The seven pitches that belong to the scale are called diatonic pitches, while the remaining five that do not are called chromatic pitches. A key does not prohibit the use of chromatic pitches, but it does imply they will be rarer than diatonic pitches. The key's tonic represents a pitch of "stability" for the music to orient around. In particular, a composition almost always ends on the tonic.

Not all music has a well defined key. Some classical compositions, such as Chopin's Prelude op. 28 no. 2 and Wagner's Tristan und Isolde, do not clearly follow these patterns. Modern atonal compositions, such as the works of Arnold Schoenberg, have no tonal center of stability and freely interweave all twelve pitches.

== Notation ==
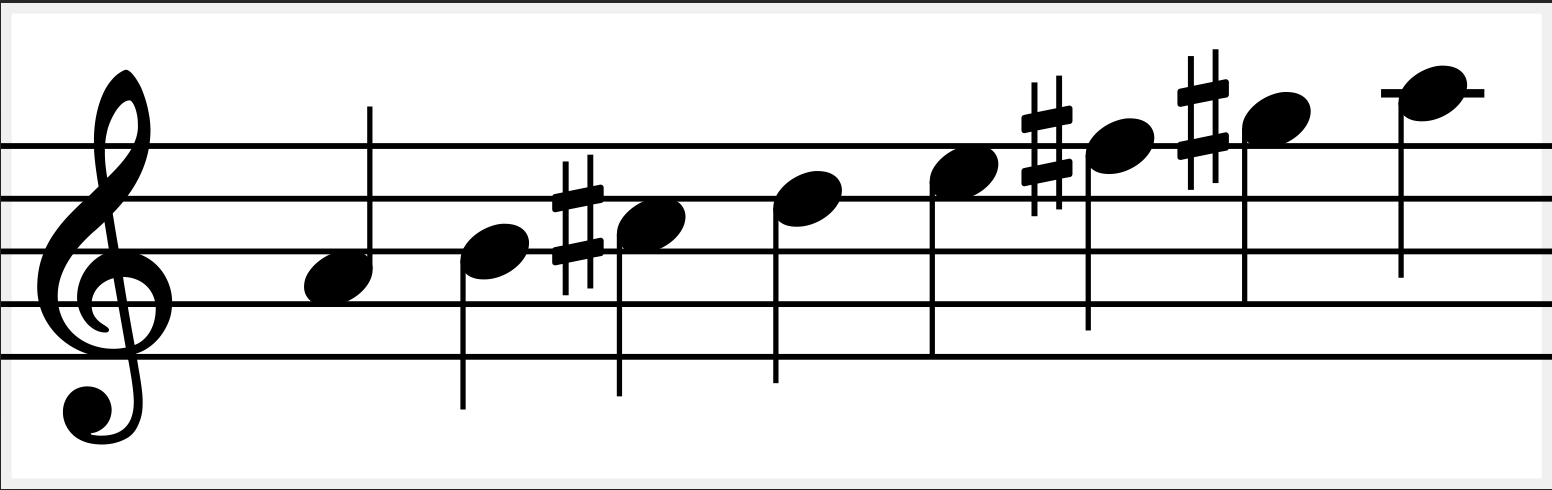
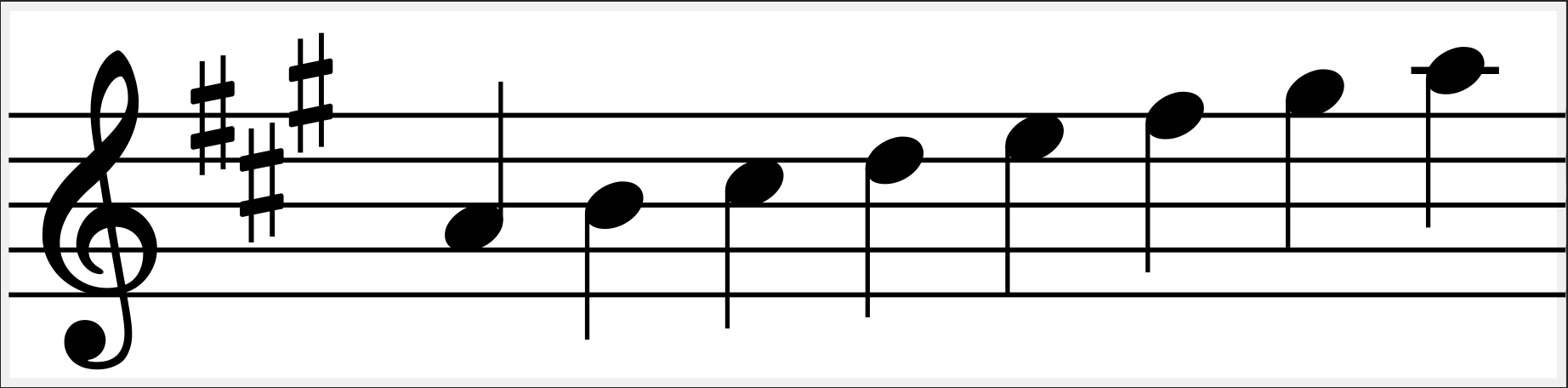
(Top) The A Major scale contains three pitches with accidentals: C♯, F♯, and G♯.

(Bottom) This can be simplified using a key signature with three initial ♯ symbols. Unless otherwise noted, these will apply to every instance of the pitches C, F, and G.

Music is written using a staff with five or more parallel lines. Pitches are represented by notes, which are placed either on a line or in the space between lines. The relationship between position and pitch is defined by a symbol called a clef. On a standard staff with a treble clef, the bottom line represents the pitch E, the line above represents G, and the space between the two lines is F. The pitch between F and G cannot be represented solely by position, so it is represented by marking either an F or G note with an accidental (♯ or ♭).

In the keys of C Major and A Minor, the common diatonic pitches do not use accidentals. When writing in other keys, the positions themselves can be marked with accidentals as a shorthand. For example, a ♯ accidental on a line or space representing F means that, unless otherwise specified, all F pitches should be raised one semitone. In this case, the accidental ♮ (natural) represents the natural pitch. When writing this shorthand notation, known as a key signature, Sharps are always arranged in the order F, C, G, D, A, E, B, while Flats use the opposite order.

A key signature allows the corresponding major or minor scale to be written without accidentals. Any accidentals outside this key signature represent less common chromatic pitches, which are not in the scale. However, a key signature does not uniquely specify a key, since it does not identify the tonic. A key signature may represent either a major or minor key with the same pitches but different tonics.

=== Transposing instruments ===
Music written in one key can be converted to another, or transposed, by raising or lowering each pitch by the same number of semitones. Some instruments, such as the clarinet, trumpet, and saxophone, are called transposing instruments, because music written for them is typically offset or transposed from what the musicians will actually play. These instruments often have multiple variations, such as a B♭ clarinet and A clarinet, and are commonly named for the pitch which corresponds to a written C. For example, an E♭ saxophone will play a written C pitch as E♭. Because of this offsetting, music for these instruments is typically written in a different key than what the performer will play. The specific type of transposing instrument may be chosen to simplify the written score by minimizing the number of accidentals in a written key signature.

=== Triad numbering ===
When multiple pitches are played simultaneously, this combination is called a chord, and the lowest pitch its root. A triad is a chord made up of three pitches, separated by a pattern of semitones, that can be written on three consecutive lines (or consecutive spaces) of a staff. A triad chord can be expressed numerically based on the position of its root pitch in a major or minor scale. This numeric notation makes it easy to transpose and compare patterns of triads across different keys.

One common approach, the Nashville number system, uses Arabic numerals to denote chords. For example, in the key of F Major, a triad with the root F is numbered 1, while a triad with the root C (the fifth pitch in an ascending F Major scale) is numbered 5. In the key of G Major, 1 instead represents a triad with the root G, while 5 represents one with the root D. Another common approach uses Roman numerals, with upper case letters for major chords and lower case letters for minor chords.

These numbering systems allow common chord patterns—such as the Blues sequence 1, 4, 1, 5, 4, 1—to be referenced independently from a given key. Especially common chord progressions may also receive shorthand names, such as the "Doo-wop progression": 1, 6, 4, 5.

== Relationships between keys ==
The Circle of Fifths shows the relationships between keys. Adjacent keys differ by a single pitch. Moving clockwise around the circle, one pitch is sharpened. Moving counterclockwise, one is flattened. Keys in the same position, such as C Major and A Minor, have the same pitches but different tonics.

The relationships between different keys can be summarized with a diagram called the Circle of Fifths. Keys which are immediately adjacent to each other on this circle share six of their seven diatonic pitches in common. The farther apart two keys are on the circle, the fewer pitches they share. Moving clockwise around the circle, each key sharpens one pitch from the previous key (that is, one pitch is raised by one semitone). Moving counterclockwise, each key flattens one pitch from the previous key. Keys which require many accidentals are named and written in two distinct forms, one using sharps and another using flats.

Major keys are placed on the outside of the circle, while minor keys are placed on the inside. A minor key in the same position as major key is said to be that key's relative minor. For example, A Minor is the relative minor of C Major. A relative minor will use the same pitches and the same key signature as its corresponding major key, but its tonic will be the sixth pitch from the ascending major scale, not the first. Keys with the same tonic but different modes (e.g. D Major and D Minor) are called parallel keys. These keys differ by three pitches, and so are offset by three positions on the Circle of Fifths.

A piece of music which is primarily written in one key may transition, or modulate, to another. The distances on the Circle of Fifths reveal the simplest modulations: transitioning between a major key and its relative minor, or moving to an adjacent key with only one differing pitch. (Note: When a piece modulates from one key to another, it typically maintains the original key signature.)

No.	Flats		Sharps	
No.	Major	minor	Major	minor
0	C	a	C	a
1	F	d	G	e
2	B♭	g	D	b
3	E♭	c	A	f♯
4	A♭	f	E	c♯
5	D♭	b♭	B	g♯
6	G♭	e♭	F♯	d♯
7	C♭	a♭	C♯	a♯
8	F♭	d♭	G♯	e♯
