= Ledger line =

Musical notation for pitches outside the regular staff

Ascending Es and Bs. The first two notes and the last two notes require ledger lines.

A ledger line or leger line is used in Western musical notation to notate pitches above or below the lines and spaces of the regular musical staff. A line slightly longer than the note head is drawn parallel to the staff, above or below, spaced at the same distance as the lines within the staff.

The origin of the word is uncertain, but may have been borrowed attributively from the term for a horizontal timber in a scaffolding, lying parallel to the face of the building and supporting the putlogs. There is no basis to support the often-found claim that the word originates from the French léger, meaning "light" or "slight". The Oxford online dictionary describes the origin of the "leger" spelling as a "variant of ledger" that first appeared in the 19th century.

Although ledger lines are found occasionally in manuscripts of plainchant and early polyphony, it was only in the early 16th century in keyboard music that their use became at all extensive. Even then, printers had an aversion to ledger lines which caused difficulties in setting type, wasting space on the page and causing a messy appearance. Vocal music employed a variety of different clefs to keep the range of the part on the staff as much as possible; in keyboard notation a common way of avoiding ledger lines was the use of open score on four staves with different clefs.

Except for woodwind players, who prefer ledger lines to 8^{va} notation because they associate fingerings with staff positions (Shatzkin 1993, 48), notes that use at least four ledger lines make music more difficult to read. For easier readability, the composer would usually switch clefs or use the 8^{va} notation. Some transposing instruments, such as the piccolo, double bass, guitar, and the tenor voice, transpose at the octave to avoid ledger lines.

Notation of tuba, trombone, and euphonium parts mostly uses ledger lines below the bass staff, but will occasionally the 8^{va} bassa notation for long passages in the low register.

The two inside ledger lines. From the third ledger line on, the lines and spaces of the regular musical staff are repeated.

Music for bass clef instruments, such as the cello, bassoon or trombone, use tenor clef for the high notes rather than the treble clef. Alto clef is used for the viola, the alto trombone, and for the tenor trombone parts in Russian repertoire. Bass trombone and tuba use the bass clef only.

A ledger line is also used to support a half rest or whole rest where there are multiple voices on one staff and such a rest is forced above or below the staff. (The rare double whole rest is suspended between two ledger lines in this situation.)
