= Michael Rath Trombones =

British manufacturer of retail and custom hand-made trombones

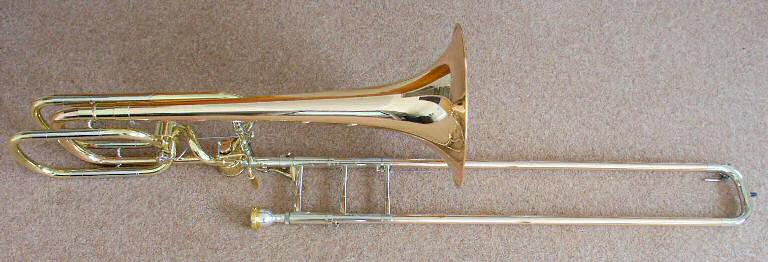
- Michael Rath R9DST bass trombone
- Industry: Musical instrument manufacturing
- Founded: 1996
- Founder: Michael Rath
- Headquarters: Honley, Huddersfield, West Yorkshire, United Kingdom
- Area served: North America, South America, Japan, Europe, Australia, New Zealand, Singapore, Taiwan
- Products: tenor, bass, contrabass, alto trombones and accessories
- Number of employees: 12
- Website: rathtrombones.com

Michael Rath Trombones is a British manufacturer of retail and custom hand-made trombones. Rath offers artist-quality and student instruments in its line of tenor, bass, contrabass and alto trombones. Rath Trombones was founded in 1996 by instrument technician Michael Rath, and is Britain's only trombone manufacturer. Rath's 12 craftspeople create as many as 500 trombones per year, exporting instruments through 25 distributors in North and South America, Japan, Europe, Australia, New Zealand, Singapore and Taiwan.

== History ==
Company founder Michael Rath (b. 1963 in Slough, Berkshire, England) studied musical instrument technology at Merton Technical College in South London. He finished at Merton in 1981 and for the next nine years served an apprenticeship with Paxman Musical Instruments, a Covent Garden-based manufacturer of (French) horns. Himself a brass player – he began on tuba at age 11 – Rath opened his own brass instrument shop in West Yorkshire, specialising in repairs and customisation. His clientele grew to include professional musicians, particularly trombonists, from throughout Europe.

In 1995, British jazz trombonist Mark Nightingale asked Rath to create a bespoke instrument. Completed in 1996 after nearly two years of prototyping, this tenor instrument became the first Rath trombone.

With tenor trombones in steady production, Michael Rath, along with technicians Andy Hutchinson and Adrian Davison, began development of a full trombone line. Hutchinson crafted bells, Davison the hands slides, and Rath did the remainder himself. Over the next decade the Rath catalogue grew to include small-bore jazz trombones, large bore symphonic instruments, bass, contrabass and alto models. Rath instruments grew increasingly popular in Europe, while less known in the U.S. Rath Trombones faced setbacks, including cash-flow problems and the increasing demands of production on what began as a three-person shop. Another blow came in 2006, when respected trombone slide specialist Adrian Davison died at the age of 28 in a motorcycle accident.

Today, Rath trombones are popular with solo artists and brass band, symphony and jazz trombone sections around the world. Their reputation has been enhanced with representation at regional and international trade shows and conventions of musicians and music educators, and a growing roster of high-profile endorsing artists. A line of student-level instruments, JP/Rath Trombones, was introduced in 2014 in collaboration with UK instrument manufacturer and distributor John Packer, and is manufactured by Rath-trained technicians.

The Rath Trombones shop is located in Honley, Huddersfield in West Yorkshire, United Kingdom. In 2015, the shop was selected from hundreds of UK businesses for a visit by Anne, Britain's Princess Royal.

Rath Trombones was acquired by John Packer in 2024.

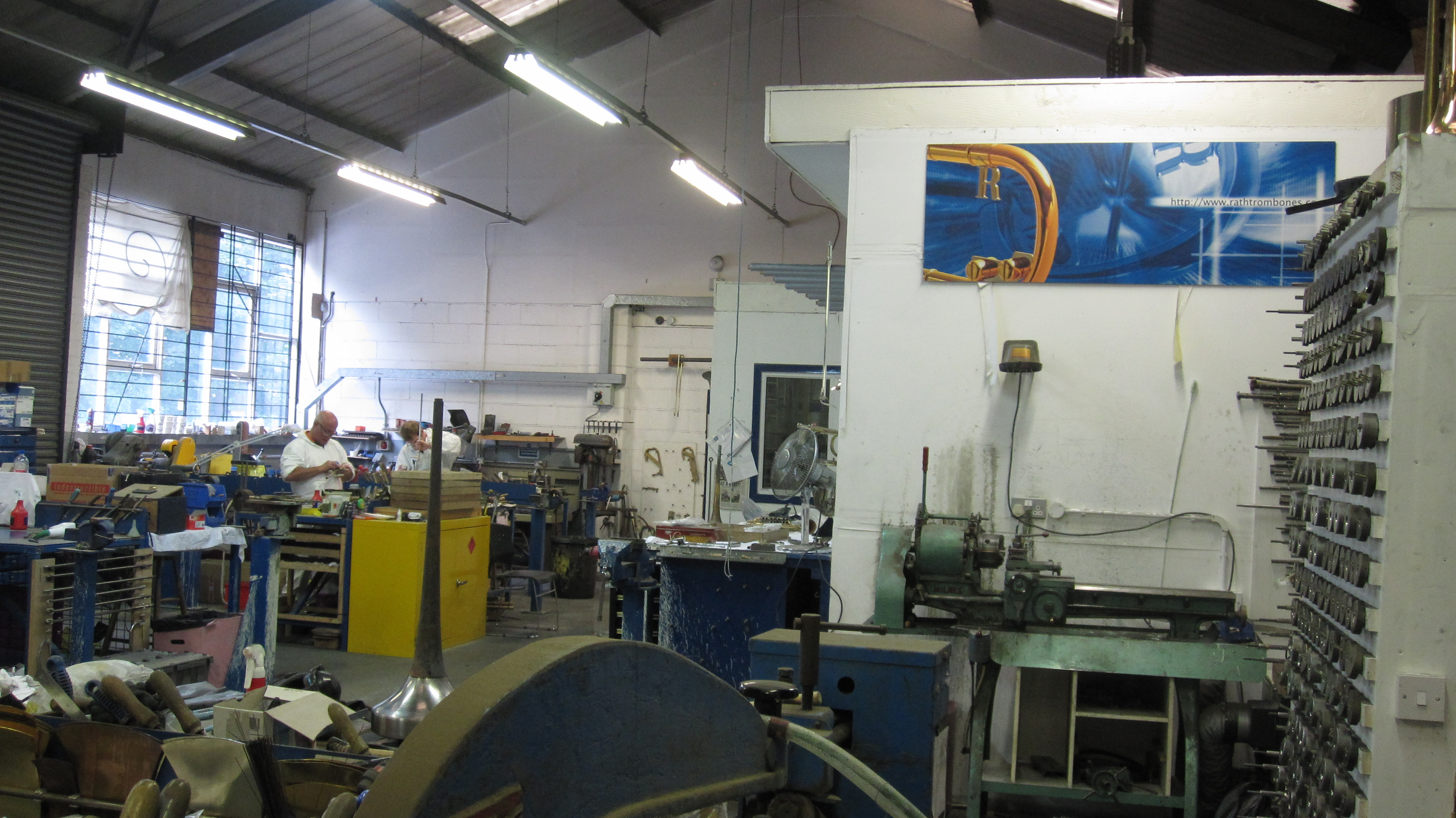
Michael Rath Trombones workshop, West Yorkshire

== Rath sections ==
Ensembles that have used Rath trombones include:

United Kingdom: Central Band of the Royal Air Force, Royal Military School of Music, Scots Guards, Royal Marines Band Service, Black Dyke Band, Salvation Army International Staff Band, London Philharmonic Orchestra, Bournemouth Symphony Orchestra, Welsh National Opera, Grimethorpe Colliery Band

Europe: Staatskapelle Berlin

Asia: China Philharmonic Orchestra

United States: Count Basie Orchestra

== Rath artists ==
Rath's international roster of endorsing trombone artists includes Bert Boeren, Jimmy Bosch, Isrea Butler, Simon Chappell (Royal Liverpool Philharmonic), Bruce Collings, Michael Dease, Wes Funderburk, Marc Godfroid, Kelsley Grant, André Hayward, Frederik Heirman, Conrad Herwig, John Higginbotham, Carol Jarvis, René Laanen, Xiaonan Li (China Philharmonic Orchestra), Shuchang Liu (China Philharmonic Orchestra), Don Lucas, Lyndon Meredith (London Philharmonic Orchestra), Lode Mertens, Kevin Morgan (Bournemouth Symphony Orchestra), Mark Nightingale, Catherine Noblet, John Rojak, Dennis Rollins, Ramón Luis Serra (Puerto Rico Symphony Orchestra), Rick Simerly, Alan Swain (Welsh National Opera), Robb Tooley (Bournemouth Symphony Orchestra), Papo Vazquez, Csaba Wagner (Staatskapelle Berlin) and Annie Whitehead.
