= Rodney Mason =

Rodney or Rod Mason may refer to:

- Rodney Mason, American actor, see Tanqueray#Advertising
- Rodney Mason (rugby league), player for Central Coast Centurions
- Colonel Rodney Mason, commander of 71st Ohio Infantry
- Rod Mason (basketball) played in 1993 FIBA Americas
- Rod Mason (musician) (1940–2017), English musician
