= Helen Vollam =

- Born: 7 June 1974 (age 50)
- Instrument: Trombone
- Member of: BBC Symphony Orchestra; Bones Apart

Helen Vollam (born 7 June 1974) is Principal Trombone for the BBC Symphony Orchestra. In 2004, she was the first woman to be appointed principal trombone in a London orchestra, and the first in a UK orchestra since Maisie Ringham of the Hallé Orchestra in the last century. She joined the trombone quartet, Bones Apart, in 2007, and is also an Associate member of the Chamber Orchestra of Europe.
