= Peter Schilperoort =

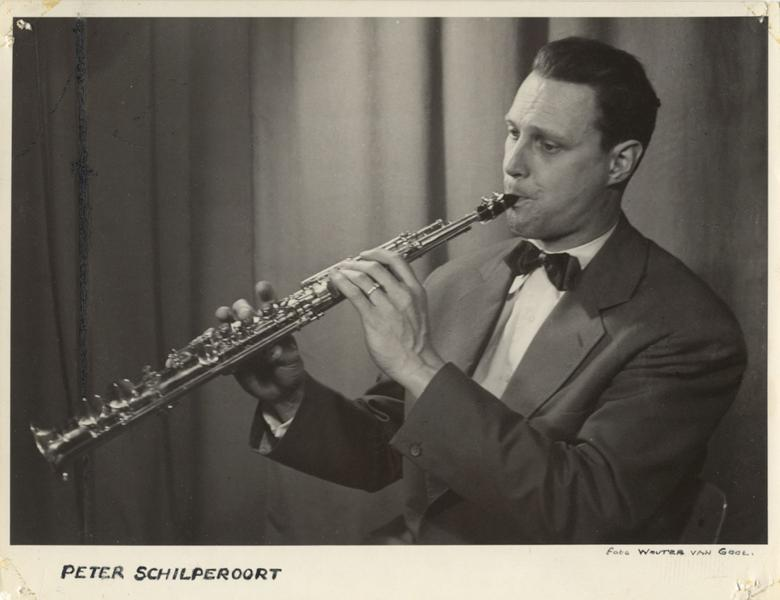

Background information
- Born: Anne Peter Schilperoort; 4 November 1919; The Hague, Netherlands
- Died: 17 November 1990 (aged 71) Leiderdorp, Netherlands
- Genres: Jazz, Dixieland, old-style jazz
- Occupation: musician

Peter Schilperoort (1919 – 17 November 1990), also known as Pat Bronx, was a Dutch musician, famous for his work with the Dutch Swing College Band, and projects with other well-known musicians. He is most recognised as a saxophone and clarinet player, but also played the guitar and the banjo. Leading the Dutch Swing College Band from 1946 to 1955, then from 1960 to 1990, his style was Dixieland, a style popular at the start of the twentieth century. His band became widely popular across Europe, Australia, Asia and South America in 1960, known as a Dixieland revival band.
