= Dutch Swing College Band =

Dutch jazz band founded in 1945

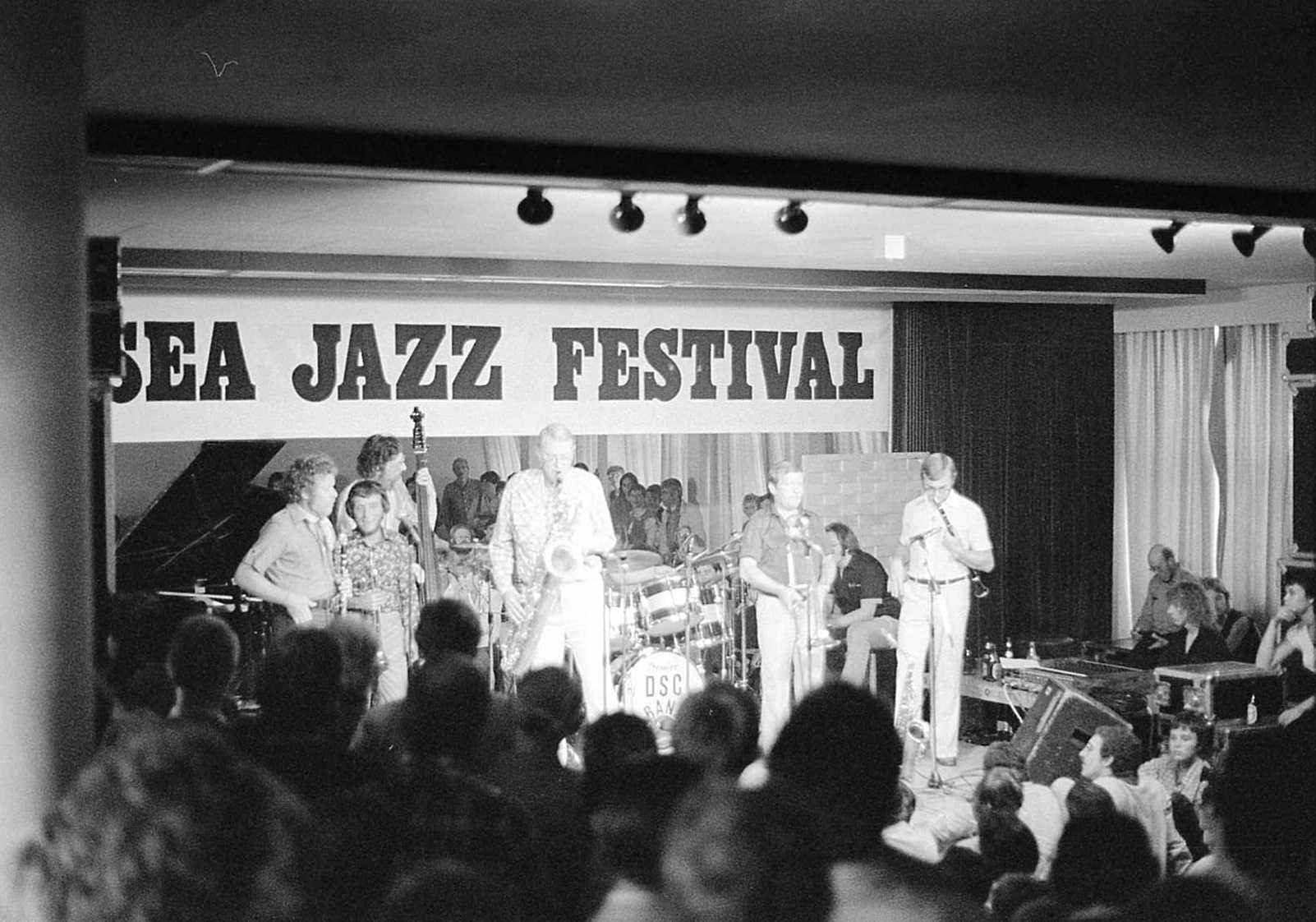
The Dutch Swing College Band performing at the North Sea Jazz Festival in 1976 or 1979.

The Dutch Swing College Band (DSCB) is a traditional dixieland band founded on 5 May 1945 by bandleader and clarinettist/saxophonist Peter Schilperoort.

Highly successful in their native home of the Netherlands, the band quickly found an international following. It has featured such musicians as Huub Janssen (drums), Henk Bosch van Drakestein (double bass), Kees van Dorser (trumpet), Dim Kesber (saxes), Jan Morks (clarinet), Wout Steenhuis (guitar), Arie Ligthart (banjo/guitar), Jaap van Kempen (banjo/guitar), Oscar Klein (trumpet), Dick Kaart (trombone), Ray Kaart (trumpet), Bert de Kort (cornet), Bert Boeren (trombone), Rod Mason, Rob Agerbeek (piano), and Emmericus Geuze (saxophone) - among many others.

The band provided the interval act for the Eurovision Song Contest 1976 presented live from Den Haag.

The band continues to tour extensively, mainly in Europe and Scandinavia, and record directed by Bob Kaper, himself a member since 1967, following the former leader, Peter Schilperoort's death on 17 November 1990. Schilperoort had led the band for more than 45 years, albeit with a five-year sabbatical from 13 September 1955, when he left to pursue an engineering career before returning to lead the band again officially on 1 January 1960.

== Line-up ==
=== Current ===
As of January 2022, the line-up is:

- Keesjan Hoogeboom, trumpet, vocals
- Bert Boeren, trombone
- David Lukàcs, clarinet, soprano saxophone, tenor saxophone, baritone saxophone
- Adrie Braat, musical director, double bass
- Frits Landesbergen, drums
- Peter Kanters, banjo, guitar

=== Previous ===
As of January 2012, the line-up is:

- Bob Kaper musical director, clarinet, alto saxophone, vocals
- Ton van Bergeijk banjo, guitar, vocals
- Keesjan Hoogeboom trumpet, vocals
- Maurits Woudenberg trombone
- Frits Kaatee clarinet, soprano saxophone, baritone saxophone
- Adrie Braat double bass
- Onno de Bruijn drums

=== Early ===
As of the end of 1945, the line-up was:

- Frans Vink Jr leader, piano
- Peter Schilperoort clarinet, alto saxophone, baritone saxophone
- Joost van Os trumpet
- Bill Brant trombone
- Otto Gobius guitar
- Henry Frohwein double bass
- Tony Nüsser drums

=== Other key line-ups ===
Other key line-ups
Year(s)	Ref	Line-up or change
1948-1952		Peter Schilperoort leader, clarinet, alto saxophone, baritone saxophone; Kees van Dorsser trumpet; Wim Kolstee trombone; Dim Kesber clarinet; Joop Schrier piano; Dick Bakker banjo; Chris Bender double bass; Arie Merkt drums.
1953-1955		Peter Schilperoort leader, clarinet, alto saxophone, baritone saxophone; Wybe Buma trumpet; Wim Kolstee trombone; Dim Kesber clarinet; Joop Schrier piano; Arie Ligthart banjo, guitar; Bob van Oven double bass; Andre Westendorp drums, trumpet.
1956-1959		Joop Schrier leader, piano; Wybe Buma trumpet; Wim Kolstee trombone; Dim Kesber clarinet, soprano sax; Jan Morks clarinet; Arie Ligthart banjo, guitar; Bob van Oven double bass; Martin Beenen drums.
1959-1961		Peter Schilperoort leader, clarinet, alto saxophone, baritone saxophone; Oscar Klein cornet, trumpet; Dick Kaart trombone; Jan Morks clarinet; Arie Ligthart banjo, guitar; Bob van Oven double bass; Martin Beenen drums.
1962		Louis de Lussanet replaces Martin Beenen on drums and Jan Morks departs)
1963-1964		Peter Schilperoort leader, clarinet, alto saxophone, baritone saxophone; Ray Kaart trumpet; Dick Kaart trombone; Arie Ligthart banjo, guitar; Koos Serierse double bass; Louis de Lussanet drums.
1965-1967		Peter Schilperoort leader, clarinet, alto saxophone, baritone saxophone; Ray Kaart trumpet; Dick Kaart trombone; Arie Ligthart banjo, guitar; Bob van Oven double bass; Peter Ypma drums.
1968-1969		Peter Schilperoort leader, clarinet, alto saxophone, baritone saxophone; Bert de Kort cornet; Dick Kaart trombone; Arie Ligthart banjo, guitar; Chris Smildiger double bass; Huub Janssen drums.
1969		Bob Kaper added
1970-1974		Peter Schilperoort leader, clarinet, alto saxophone, baritone saxophone; Bert de Kort cornet; Dick Kaart trombone; Bob Kaper clarinet; Arie Ligthart banjo, guitar; Henk Bosch van Drakestein double bass; Huub Janssen drums.
1974-1978		Peter Schilperoort leader, clarinet, alto saxophone, baritone saxophone; Bert de Kort cornet; Dick Kaart trombone; Bob Kaper clarinet; Jaap van Kempen banjo, guitar; Henk Bosch van Drakestein double bass; Huub Janssen drums.
1978-1980		Peter Schilperoort leader, clarinet, alto saxophone, tenor saxophone; Ray Kaart trumpet; Dick Kaart trombone; Bob Kaper clarinet; Jaap van Kempen banjo, guitar; Henk Bosch van Drakestein double bass; Huub Janssen drums.
1980-1982		Peter Schilperoort leader, clarinet, alto saxophone, baritone saxophone; Rod Mason trumpet, sousaphone; Dick Kaart trombone, B-horn; Bob Kaper clarinet, alto saxophone; Fred McMurray piano; Henk Bosch van Drakestein double bass; Huub Janssen drums.
1988-1990		Peter Schilperoort leader, clarinet, alto saxophone, baritone saxophone; Sytze van Duin trumpet; Bob Kaper clarinet, alto saxophone; Bert Boeren trombone; Fred McMurray piano; Adrie Braat double bass; Huub Janssen drums.
1993		Bob Kaper – leader, clarinet, alto saxophone; Klaas Wit trumpet, Flugelhorn; Bert Boeren trombone; Fred McMurray piano; Adrie Braat double bass; Bob Dekker drums.
1996-1998		Bob Kaper leader, clarinet, alto saxophone; Michael Varekamp trumpet; Bert Boeren trombone; Fred McMurray piano; Adrie Braat double bass; Bob Dekker drums.
2000-2004		Bob Kaper leader, clarinet, alto saxophone; Bert de Kort cornet; Frits Kaatee clarinet, baritone saxophone, soprano saxophone; George Kaatee trombone; Rob Agerbeek piano; Ton van Bergeijk banjo, guitar; Adrie Braat double bass; Bob Dekker drums.
2004-2010		Bob Kaper leader, clarinet, alto saxophone; Bert de Kort cornet; Frits Kaatee clarinet, baritone saxophone, soprano saxophone; George Kaatee trombone; Marcel Hendriks piano; Ton van Bergeijk banjo, guitar; Adrie Braat double bass; Han Brink drums.

== Discography ==
With a recording history from 1945 to the present day in 2012 many albums and singles have been recorded. Recording media from 78 rpm discs, 33 and 45 rpm records and CDs and DVDs on variety of labels, including Philips and the band's own DSC production label.

As well as recording on its own, recordings were made with a number of notable US solo artists beginning in 1951 with Sidney Bechet and continuing into the 1970s with the likes of Jimmy Witherspoon in 1970, Joe Venuti in 1971, Teddy Wilson in 1972 and 1973, Billy Butterfield in 1973, Bud Freeman in 1975 and Wild Bill Davison in 1976.

Tracks recorded over the history of the band include amongst many others "Tin Roof Blues", "Apex Blues", "Panama", "Shake Rag", "Everything's Wrong, Ain't Nothing Right", "Freeze n' Melt", "Strange Peach", Royal Garden Blues, Jazz Me Blues, High Society, Out of the Gallion, At the Jazzband Ball, That's a Plenty, Nobody Knows When You Are Down and Out, Annie Street Rock, Figety Feet, "Margie".

Note: Decca 846 761-2 The Singles Collection Volume 1, other CDs are available

Albums

- Dutch Swing College Band HOT ( Opnames van 1951-1956)
- Dutch Swing College Band (25 cm LP met 8 nummers, datum onbekend)
- Dixieland Goes Dutch (1955)
- Dutch Swing College Band with Nelson Williams (1957)
- Swing College At Home (1958)
- Jazz at the Concertgebouw A'dam feat. Neva Raphaello. (1958)
- Swinging Studio Sessions (1959)
- The Band's Best (1959, 1960)
- 12 Jazz Classics (1961)
- Party Favourites (May & June 1961)
- At the Jazzband Ball (1961)
- Dixie Gone Dutch (1962)
- DSC At the European Jazz Festival (Comblain-la-Tour, Belgium 1962)
- The Dutch Swing College Band at the Sport Palast Berlin (1962)
- The Dutch Swing College Band Meets Teddy Wilson (1964)
- Dutch Swing College Band goes Latin (1964)
- 20 Years DSC (Live at Sportpalast Berlin (1965)
- Live Party (Maart 1965)
- Reunion Jazz band (Sept 1966)
- When the Swing comes Marching in (1968)
- Dutch Swing College Band Meets Jimmy Witherspoon - Ain't Nobody's Business (1970)
- Dutch Swing College Band Meets Joe Venuti (1971)
- Johnny Goes Dixie (feat. Johnny Meijer) (1974}
- DSC 'Live' (1974)
- Dutch Swing College Band and Bud Freeman (1975)
- Dutch Swing College Band (1976)
- DSC Hit Collection (1977)
- 'Still Blowing Strong' 34 Years (1978)
- The Dutch Swing College Band Jubilee Concert (May 1980)
- Digital Dixie (1981)
- Digital Anniversary (1985)
- Live 1974 (1997)
- The Real Thing - European City Concerts (2003)
- We Double Dare You (2004)
- The Swing Code (2005)
- Swing that Music (2006)
- When You're Smiling - with Lils Mackintosh (2007)
- My Tune - Single (2008)
- My Inspiration (2009)
- Jubilee Concert - recorded in The Hague on the occasion of the Band celebrating 65 years (2010)
- Update (2012)
- The Music Goes Round and Round - featuring Margriet Sjordsma (2014)
- When the Swing comes marching on (2015)
- LIVE! (2015)
- Candlenight Blues - Single (2016)
- The Dutch Swing College band Plays Royal Compositions of his majesty king Bhumibol Adulyadej (2016)
