= René Laanen =

Dutch trombonist

Antonius Philippus René Laanen (born 23 January 1952) is a Dutch bass trombonist. He is an artist/clinician for Michael Rath Trombones. His personal instrument is a Rath R9 with Rotax valves.

Born in The Hague, Laanen's father Theo was a solo-trumpet player at the Hague Philharmonic Orchestra and teacher at the Royal Conservatory in the Hague. After training in the Royal Conservatory, he worked in the 1960s and early 1970s as a freelance trombonist in Germany and his home country.

In 1972 he founded the Hague Trombone Quartet with Arthur Moore and the brothers Bart and Erik van Lier. In 1980 he played with the Pretoria Symphony Orchestra in Johannesburg, South Africa.

In the 1990s he worked as a music copyist for the famous Metropole Orchestra.

He also runs a web site "Trombone Page of the world".
