= Bert Boeren =

Dutch jazz trombonist and educator

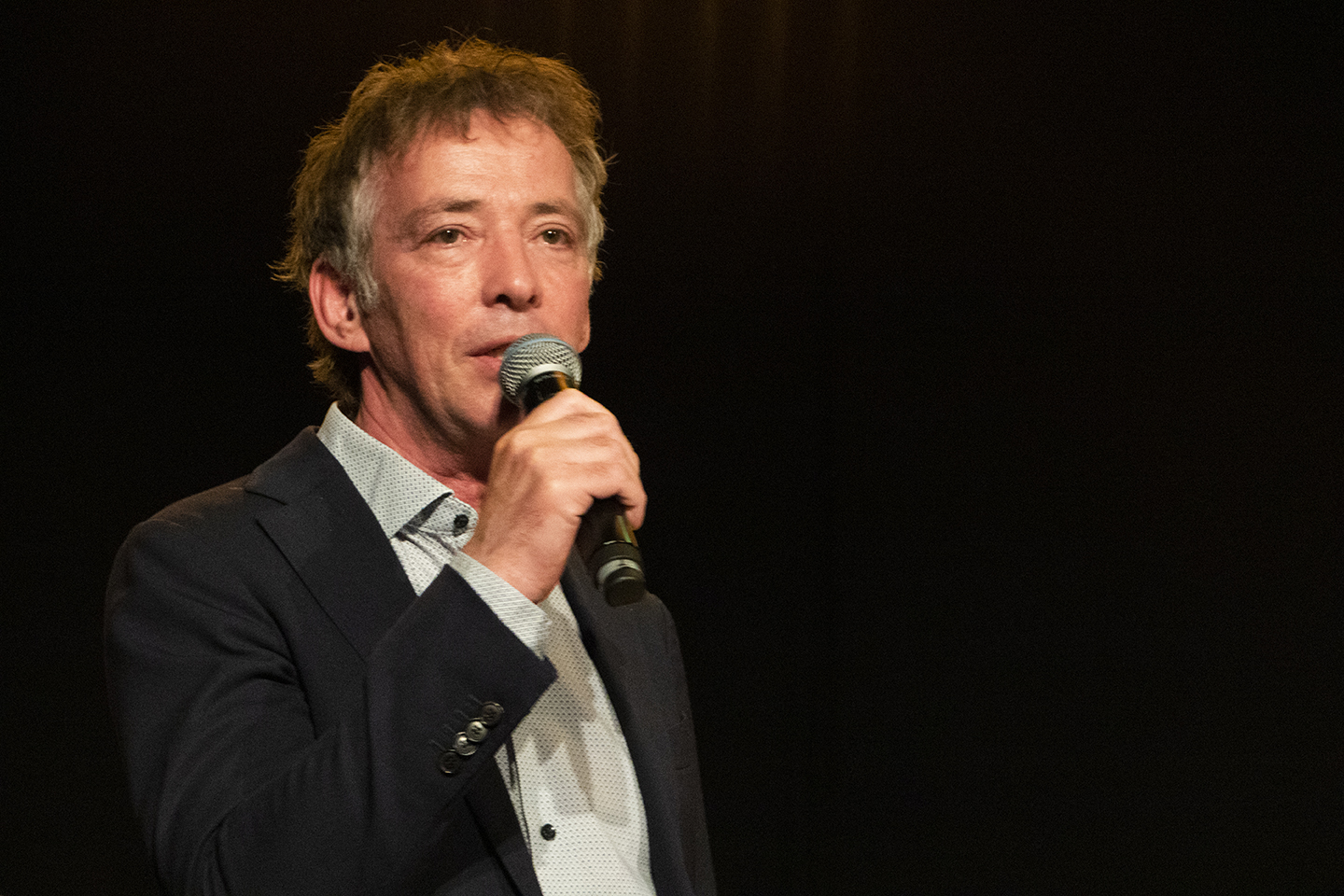

Background information
- Born: 11 March 1962 (age 64); Vught, Netherlands
- Genres: Jazz
- Occupations: Trombonist, educator
- Instrument: Trombone

Bert Boeren (born March 11, 1962) is a Dutch jazz trombonist and educator.

== Early life and education ==
Boeren was born in Vught, Netherlands, on March 11, 1962. He took up the trombone at the age of 16. In 1981, Boeren went to study classical music at the Conservatory in Utrecht, and in 1983, moved to the Conservatory in Hilversum in order to study jazz under Bart van Lier. While at Hilversum, he took part in workshops with some of the foremost jazz musicians of the day, including Bob Brookmeyer, Frank Foster, Bill Holman, and Mel Lewis.

== Career ==
Since 1987, he has taught at various conservatories and schools, including the Rotterdam Conservatory and the Royal Conservatory of The Hague.

He was chosen to represent the Netherlands as a soloist at the 1989 Nordring Festival in Budapest, in 1990 as part of the European Broadcasting Union Big Band in Austria, and as a soloist at the 1991 Strasbourg European Radioweek.

Boeren has toured worldwide, both as soloist and as a member of various bands. He has played in the Eurojazz Big Band, the Swingcats, the Dutch Swing College Band, the Bob Brookmeyer Big Band, and in Bart's Bones. In 1992 he appeared as a soloist at the Classical Jazz Festival in Palm Springs, California.

He's currently playing with the Jazz Orchestra of the Concertgebouw, Masters of Swing, and the Frits Landesbergen Baileo Big Band. He can be heard on the Daybreak album 'en blanc et noir' #11 with the Rob van Bavel Trio.

Boeren is an artist/clinician for Michael Rath Trombones. His personal instrument is a brass/nickel silver Rath R1.
