= Carol Jarvis =

- Born: Northampton, England
- Occupation: Musician
- Instrument: Trombone
- Website: Official website

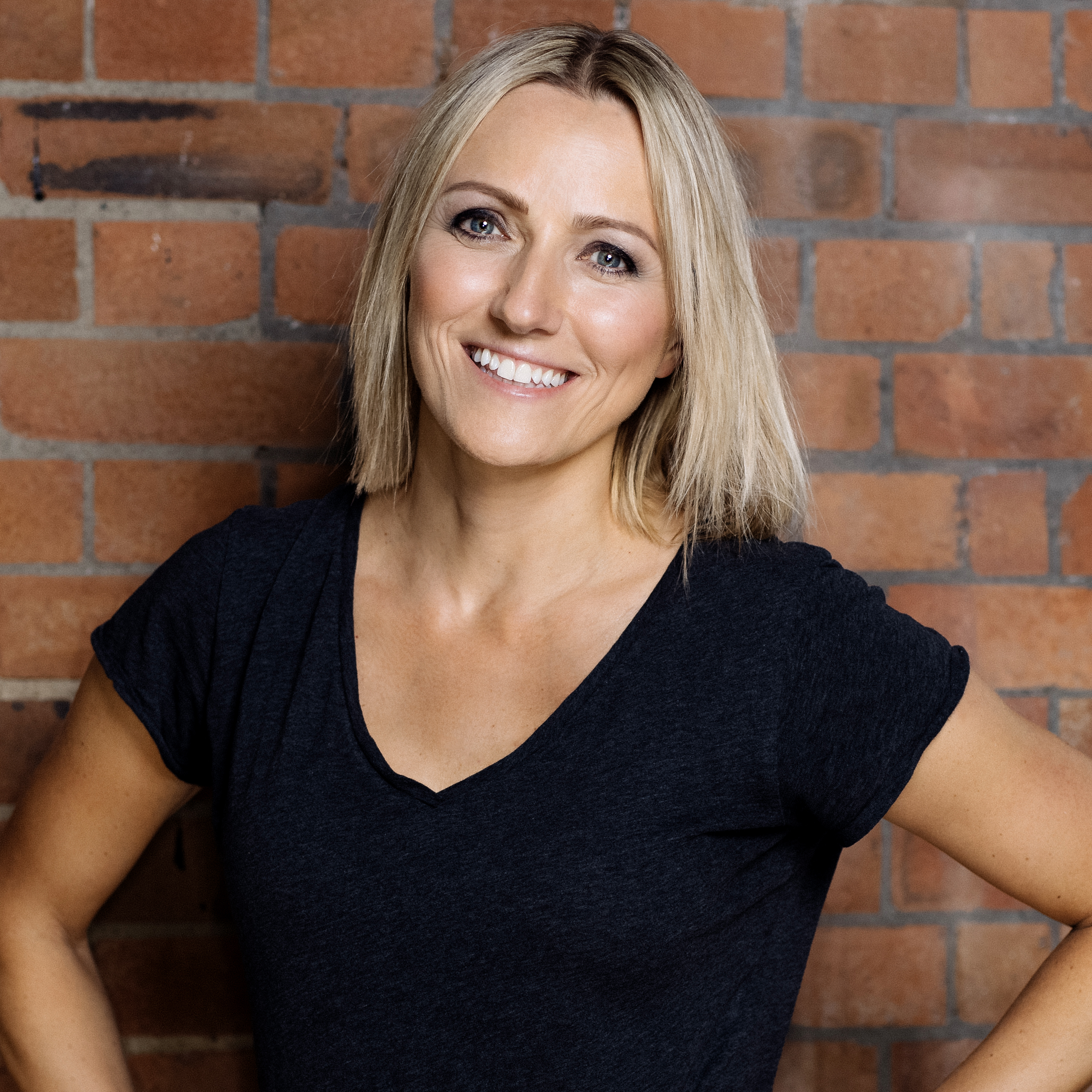

Carol Jarvis is an English trombonist, keyboard player, arranger, educator, and voiceover artist.

== Early life ==
Jarvis was born in Northampton, England, and grew up in Newport Pagnell, Buckinghamshire. She attended Portfields School in Newport Pagnell and later studied at Ousedale School, Radcliffe School, and Stantonbury Campus in Milton Keynes. She began her musical training at the Stantonbury Music Centre.

== Career ==
Jarvis has worked as a session musician on film soundtracks, commercials, jingles, and studio albums. She has performed with orchestras including playing principal trombone with the likes of the London Symphony Orchestra, the Hallé Orchestra, the BBC Concert Orchestra and lead trombone with the Metropole Orkest.

She has also worked with artists including Taylor Swift, Amy Winehouse, Bon Jovi, Rita Ora, Elbow, Ellie Goulding, Elbow, Ben Howard, Michael Bublé, Mumford and Sons, Queen, Harry Connick Jr., Rod Stewart, Muse, Sting, Michael Bolton, and Seal.

Jarvis has written orchestral arrangements for Seal and the San Francisco Symphony Orchestra, and served as assistant orchestrator for critically acclaimed second and third albums by Corinne Bailey Rae.

She became president of the International Trombone Association in 2023, becoming the first woman to hold the role in the organisation's history.

Jarvis is a professor of trombone at the Royal Northern College of Music and been a professor at Trinity Laban Conservatoire of Music and Dance since 2006. She has given masterclasses and recitals across the world, from Mexico to Peru and Norway to Los Angeles.

== Health ==
In October 2004 Jarvis was diagnosed with Hodgkin’s Lymphoma. She gives talks across the globe about her fight with cancer, from Boston to Singapore, Brazil to Croatia and Denmark to Mexico. She has been in remission since 2011.

== Awards ==
- International Trombone Association - ITA Award 2022 (presented every year to an individual who has greatly influenced the field of trombone)
- British Trombone Society - Sheila Tracy Award 2021
- International Trombone Association - President's Award 2013
- Brass Herald - Brass Personality of the Year 2004
- Royal Over-Seas League Competition (Bones Apart Trombone Quartet) 2001
- Rio Tino Prize and Miller Trophy (Bones Apart Trombone Quartet) 2001
- Agnes D Bell Scholarship 2000
- Dorothy Lily Pope Scholarship 2000
- British Trombone Society/Jiggs Whigham Scholarship to study in America 1999
- Goronwy Evans Brass Prize (RNCM) 1998
- Sema Group Jazz Improvisation Award 1998
- Buckinghamshire County Music Scholarship 1990

== Discography ==
- In My Veins (2023)
- Smile (2011) (proceeds go to Macmillan Cancer Support)
