= Bones Apart =

English all-female trombone quartet

- Origin: Manchester, England
- Genres: Various
- Years active: 1999–present
- Members: Becky Smith; Sarah Williams; Jayne Murrill; Helen Vollam
- Past members: Carol Jarvis; Becca Harper; Arlene Macfarlane; Lorna McDonald; Camilla Tveit
- Website: bonesapart.com

Bones Apart is an English all-female trombone quartet. The group formed in 1999 at the Royal Northern College of Music in Manchester. As of 2019, the group includes Becky Smith, Sarah Williams, Jayne Murrill, and Helen Vollam. Former members include Carol Jarvis, Becca Harper, Lorna McDonald, Camilla Tveit and Arlene Macfarlane.

== Tours and performances ==
The quartet has toured throughout Europe, Japan and in the United States including performances at the International Trombone Festival, the International Women's Brass Conference, the Spanish Brass Festival, and the Edinburgh International Festival, Scandinavian Trombone Festival, Lieksa Brass Week, Vilnius Festival, Bury St Edmunds Festival, Leicester International Music Festival, Sauerland-Herbst Festival, Eastern Trombone Workshop in Washington, DC.

== Awards ==
The group won the 2001 Royal Over-Seas League Competition and has also won the Philip Jones Award.

== Discography ==
Bones Apart has released four albums.

- No More Blues (2002)
- Enigma (2006)
- four4four (2009)
- ten (2009) - 10th anniversary CD
