= Clef =

Musical symbol used to indicate the written pitches of notes

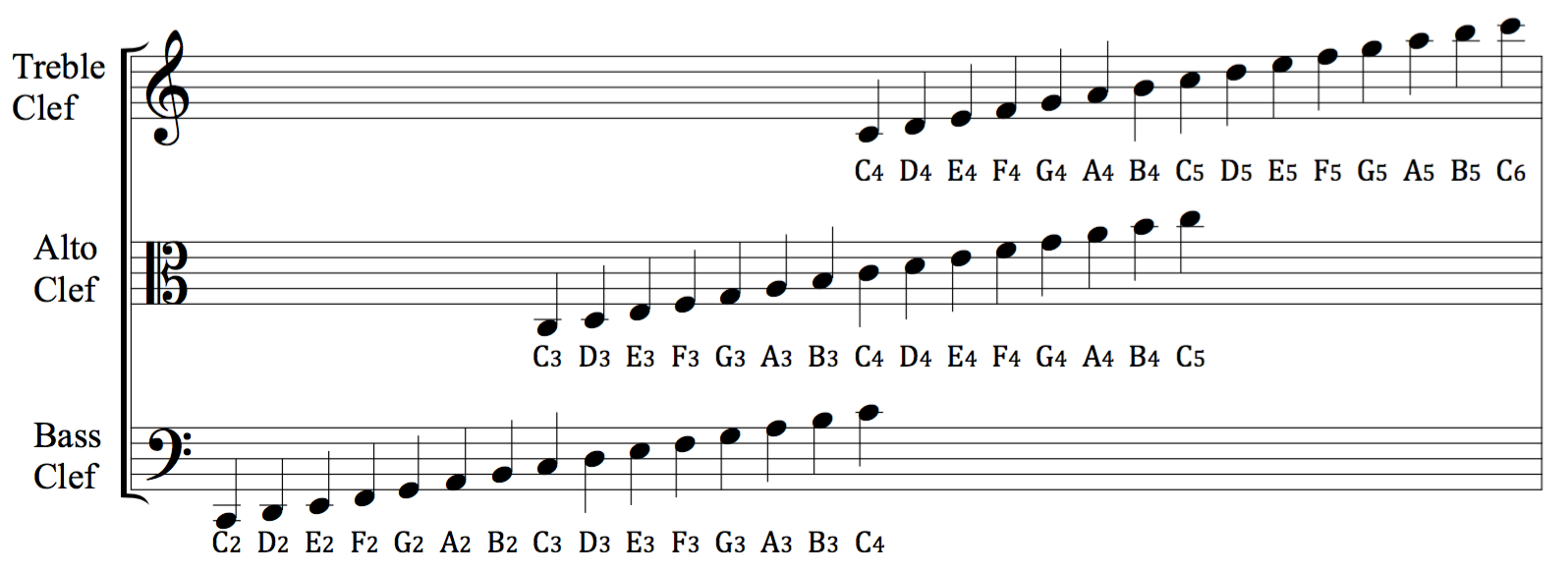
Diagram of treble, alto, and bass clefs with identical-sounding musical notes aligned vertically

Middle C represented on (from left to right) treble, alto, tenor, and bass clefs

Three clefs aligned to middle C

A clef (from French: clef 'key') is a musical symbol used to indicate which notes are represented by the lines and spaces on a musical staff. Placing a clef on a staff assigns a particular pitch to one of the five lines or four spaces, which defines the pitches on the remaining lines and spaces.

The three clef symbols used in modern music notation are the G-clef, F-clef, and C-clef. Placing these clefs on a line fixes a reference note to that line—an F-clef fixes the F below middle C, a C-clef fixes middle C, and a G-clef fixes the G above middle C. In modern music notation, the G-clef is most frequently seen as treble clef (placing G_{4} on the second line of the staff), and the F-clef as bass clef (placing F_{3} on the fourth line). The C-clef is mostly encountered as alto clef (placing middle C on the third line) or tenor clef (middle C on the fourth line). A clef may be placed on a space instead of a line, but this is rare.

The use of different clefs makes it possible to write music for all instruments and voices, regardless of differences in range. Using different clefs for different instruments and voices allows each part to be written comfortably on a staff with a minimum of ledger lines. To this end, the G-clef is used for high parts, the C-clef for middle parts, and the F-clef for low parts. Transposing instruments can be an exception to this—the same clef is generally used for all instruments in a family, regardless of their sounding pitch. For example, even the low saxophones read in treble clef.

A symmetry exists surrounding middle C regarding the F-, C- and G-clefs. C-clef defines middle C whereas G-clef and F-clef define the note at the interval of a fifth above middle C and below middle C, respectively.

Common mnemonics for the notes on treble clef:

- Every Good Boy Does Fine (lines)
- F A C E (spaces)

For bass clef:

- Good Boys Do Fine Always (lines)
- All Cows Eat Grass (spaces)

== Placement on the staff ==
Theoretically, any clef may be placed on any line. With five lines on the staff and three clefs, there are fifteen possibilities for clef placement. Six of these are redundant because they result in an identical assignment of the notes—for example, a G-clef on the third line yields the same note placement as a C-clef on the bottom line. Thus there are nine possible distinct clefs when limiting their placement to the lines. All have been used historically: the G-clef on the two bottom lines, the F-clef on the three top lines, and the C-clef on the four bottom lines. The C-clef on the topmost line has also been used, but is equivalent to the F-clef on the third line, giving a total of ten historically attested clefs placed on the lines. In addition, the C-clef has been used on the third space, i.e. not on a line at all. This is equivalent to the more common suboctave treble clef.

The ten clefs placed on lines (two are equivalent) have different names based on the tessitura for which they are best suited.

The ten possible clefs placed on lines

In modern music, only four clefs are used regularly: treble clef, bass clef, alto clef, and tenor clef. Of these, the treble and bass clefs are by far the most common. The tenor clef is used for the upper register of several instruments that usually use bass clef (including cello, bassoon, and trombone), while the alto is most prominently used by the viola. Music for instruments and voices that transpose at the octave is generally written at the transposed pitch, but is sometimes seen written at concert pitch using an octave clef.

Common clefs

Clef	Name	Note	Note Location
	G-clef	G_{4}	On the line that passes through the curl of the clef
	C-clef	C_{4} (Middle C)	On the line that passes through the centre of the clef
	F-clef	F_{3}	On the line that passes between the two dots of the clef

== Individual clefs ==
This section shows a complete list of the clefs, along with a list of instruments and voice parts notated with them. A dagger (†) after the name of a clef indicates that the clef is no longer in common use.

G-clef

=== G-clefs ===
==== Treble clef ====
Treble clef

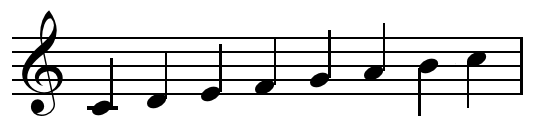
C major scale, treble clef.

The only G-clef still in use is the treble clef, with the G-clef placed on the second line. This is the most common clef in use and is generally the first clef learned by music students. For this reason, the terms "G-clef" and "treble clef" are often seen as synonymous. The treble clef was historically used to mark a treble, or pre-pubescent, voice part.

Instruments that use the treble clef include violin, flute, oboe, cor anglais, all clarinets, all saxophones, horn, trumpet, cornet, vibraphone, xylophone, mandolin, recorder, bagpipe and guitar. Euphonium and baritone horn are sometimes treated as transposing instruments, using the treble clef and sounding a major ninth lower, and are sometimes treated as concert-pitch instruments, using bass clef. The treble clef is also the upper staff of the grand staff used for harp and keyboard instruments. Most high parts for bass-clef instruments (e.g. cello, double bass, bassoon, and trombone) are written in the tenor clef, but very high pitches may be notated in the treble clef. The viola also may use the treble clef for very high notes. The treble clef is used for the soprano, mezzo-soprano, alto, contralto and tenor voices. Tenor voice parts sound an octave lower and are often written using an octave clef (see below) or a double-treble clef.

==== French violin clef^{†} ====
French clef

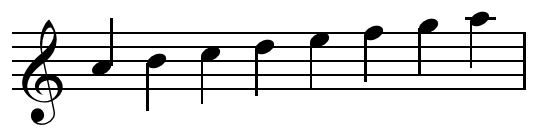
C major scale, French violin clef.

A G-clef placed on the first line is called the French clef, or French violin clef. It was used in France in the seventeenth and eighteenth centuries for violin music and flute music. It places the notes in the same staff positions as the bass clef, but two octaves higher.

F-clef

=== F-clefs ===
==== Baritone clef^{†} ====
Baritone clef

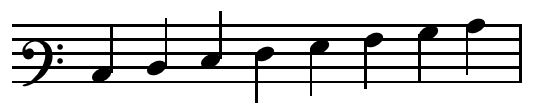
C major scale, baritone F-clef.

Baritone clef

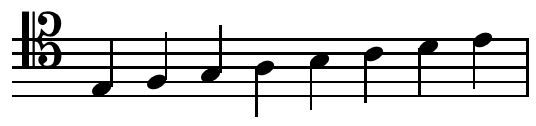
C major scale, baritone C-clef.

When the F-clef is placed on the third line, it is called the baritone clef. Baritone clef was used for the left hand of keyboard music (particularly in France; see Bauyn manuscript) and for baritone parts in vocal music. A C-clef on the fifth line creates a staff with identical notes to the baritone clef, but this variant is rare.

==== Bass clef ====
Bass clef

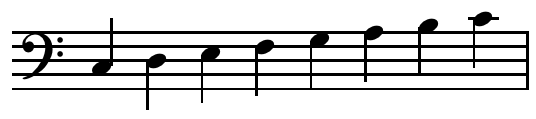
C major scale, bass clef.

The only F-clef still in use is the bass clef, with the clef placed on the fourth line. Since it is the only F-clef commonly encountered, the terms "F-clef" and "bass clef" are often regarded as synonymous.

Bass clef is used for the cello, double bass and bass guitar, bassoon and contrabassoon, bass recorder, trombone, tuba, and timpani. It is used for baritone horn or euphonium when their parts are written at concert pitch, and sometimes for the lowest notes of the horn. Baritone and bass voices also use bass clef, and the tenor voice is notated in bass clef if the tenor and bass are written on the same staff. Bass clef is the bottom clef in the grand staff for harp and keyboard instruments. Double bass, bass guitar, and contrabassoon sound an octave lower than the written pitch; some scores show an "8" beneath the clef for these instruments to differentiate from instruments that sound at the actual written pitch (see "Octave clefs" below).

==== Sub-bass clef^{†} ====
Sub-bass clef

When the F-clef is placed on the fifth line, it is called the sub-bass clef. It was used by Johannes Ockeghem and Heinrich Schütz to write low bass parts, by Monsieur de Sainte-Colombe for low notes on the bass viol, and by J. S. Bach in his Musical Offering.

It is the same as the treble clef, but two octaves lower, making the top line F3 (174.614Hz) and the bottom line E2 (82.41Hz).

C-clef

=== C-clefs ===
==== Alto clef ====
Alto clef

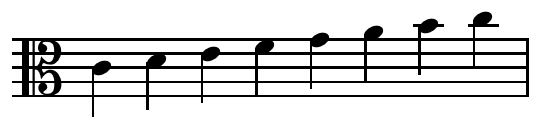
C major scale, alto clef.

A C-clef on the third line of the staff is called the alto or viola clef. It is currently used for viola, viola d'amore, alto trombone, viola da gamba, and mandola. It is also associated with the countertenor voice and sometimes called the countertenor clef. A vestige of this survives in Sergei Prokofiev's use of the clef for the cor anglais in his symphonies. It occasionally appears in keyboard music (for example, in Brahms's Organ Chorales and John Cage's Dream for piano). It was originally used for alto parts in choral music to reduce the number of ledger lines needed, since much of the alto range is between treble and bass clef. Alto parts are now commonly written in treble clef instead.

==== Tenor clef ====
Tenor clef

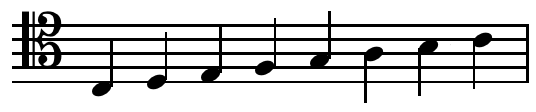
C major scale, tenor clef.

A C-clef on the fourth line of the staff is called tenor clef. It is used for the viola da gamba (rarely, and mostly in German scores; otherwise the alto clef is used) and for upper ranges of bass-clef instruments such as the bassoon, cello, euphonium, double bass, and tenor trombone. Treble clef may also be used for the upper extremes of these bass-clef instruments. Tenor violin parts were also written in this clef (see e.g. Giovanni Battista Vitali's Op. 11). It was used by the tenor part in vocal music but its use has been largely supplanted either with an octave version of the treble clef or with bass clef when tenor and bass parts are written on a single staff.

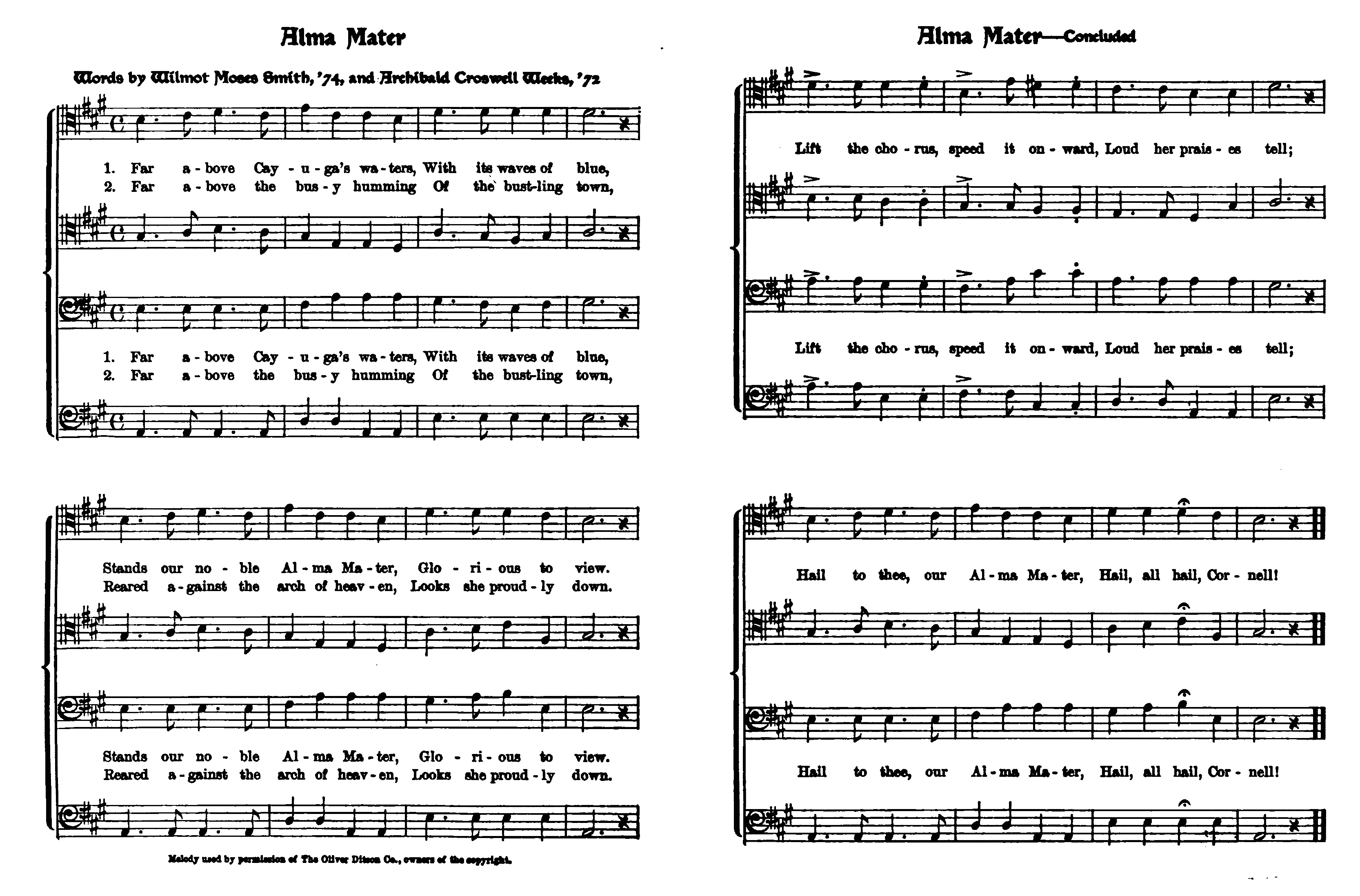
Male chorus arrangement showing use of ladder-shaped C-clef.

Another tenor clef variant, formerly used in music for male chorus, has a ladder-like shape. This C-clef places the C on the third space of the staff, and is equivalent to the sub-octave treble clef. See also History.

==== Mezzo-soprano clef^{†} ====
Mezzo-soprano clef

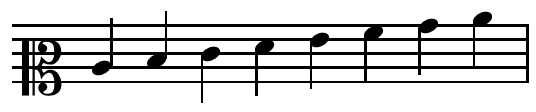
C major scale, mezzo-soprano clef.

A C-clef on the second line of the staff is called the mezzo-soprano clef, rarely used in modern Western classical music. It was used in 17th century French orchestral music for the second viola or first tenor part ('taille') by such composers as Lully, and for mezzo-soprano voices in operatic roles, notably by Claudio Monteverdi. Mezzo-soprano clef was also used for certain flute parts during renaissance, especially when doubling vocal lines. In Azerbaijani music, the tar uses this clef.

==== Soprano clef^{†} ====
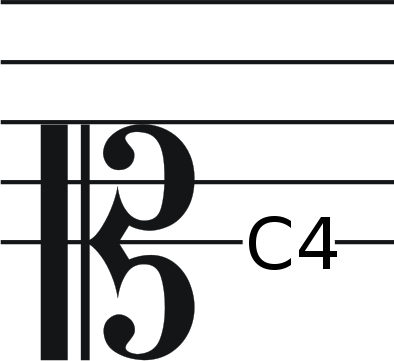
Soprano clef

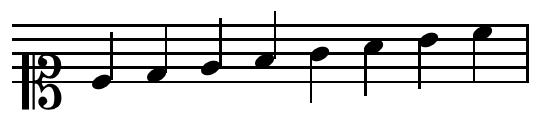
C major scale, soprano clef.

A C-clef on the first line of the staff is called the soprano clef. It was used for the right hand of keyboard music (particularly in France – see Bauyn manuscript), in vocal music for sopranos, and sometimes for high viola da gamba parts along with the alto clef. It was used for the second violin part ('haute-contre') in 17th century French music.

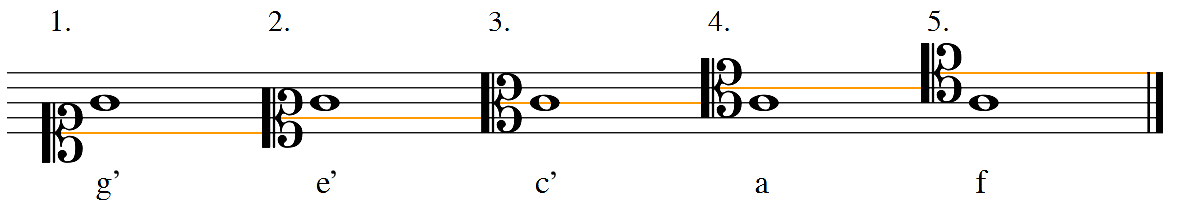
The same line on the staff in different clefs means different pitches. The line indicating C (going from the center of a clef) is marked in orange. The clefs as numbered in the diagram are: 1. Soprano clef; 2. Mezzo-soprano clef; 3. Alto clef; 4. Tenor clef; 5. Baritone clef

== Other clefs ==
=== Octave clefs ===
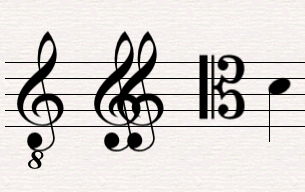
Three types of suboctave treble clef showing middle C

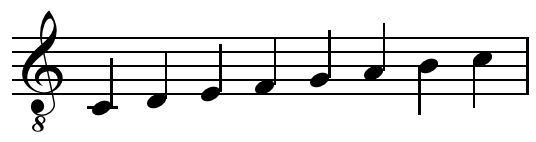
C major scale, suboctave clef.

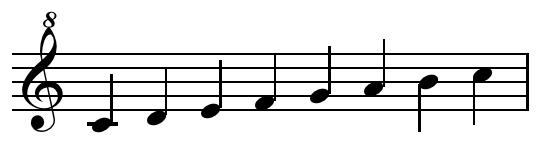
C major scale, "sopranino" clef. (this is one octave higher than the treble clef without an 8)

Starting in the 18th century, music for some instruments (such as guitar) and for the tenor voice have used treble clef, although they sound an octave lower. To avoid ambiguity, modified clefs are sometimes used, especially in choral writing. Using a C-clef on the third space places the notes identically, but this notation is much less common as it is easily confused with the alto and tenor clefs.

Such a modified treble clef is most often found in tenor parts in SATB and TTBB settings, using a treble clef with the numeral 8 below it. This indicates that the pitches sound an octave lower. As the true tenor clef has fallen into disuse in vocal writings, this "octave-dropped" treble clef is often called the tenor clef. In TTBB arrangements, the 8 is sometimes omitted but the notes are still sung an octave lower.

The same clef is sometimes used for the octave mandolin. This can also be indicated with two overlapping G-clefs.

Tenor banjo is commonly notated in treble clef. However, notation varies between the written pitch sounding an octave lower (as in guitar music and called octave pitch in most tenor banjo methods) and music sounding at the written pitch (called actual pitch). An attempt has been made to use a treble clef with a diagonal line through the upper half of the clef to indicate octave pitch, but this is not always used.

To indicate that notes sound an octave higher than written, a treble clef with an 8 positioned above the clef may be used for penny whistle, soprano and sopranino recorder, and other high woodwind parts. A treble clef with a 15 above (sounding two octaves above the standard treble clef) is used for the garklein (sopranissimo) recorder.

An F-clef can also be notated with an octave marker. While the F-clef notated to sound an octave lower can be used for contrabass instruments such as the double bass and contrabassoon, and the F-clef notated to sound an octave higher can be used for the bass recorder, these uses are extremely rare. In Italian scores up to Gioachino Rossini's Overture to William Tell, the cor anglais was written in bass clef an octave lower than sounding. The unmodified bass clef is so common that performers of instruments whose ranges lie below the staff simply learn to read ledger lines.

Octave-up F-clef

The octave-up F-clef is also used in women's barbershop music, allowing singers to maintain the convention that the upper two voices (called "tenor" and "lead", with tenor being a harmony part above the melody and lead usually taking the melody) use the treble clef, whereas the lower two voices ("baritone" and "bass") use the bass clef.

=== Neutral clef ===
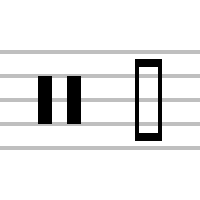

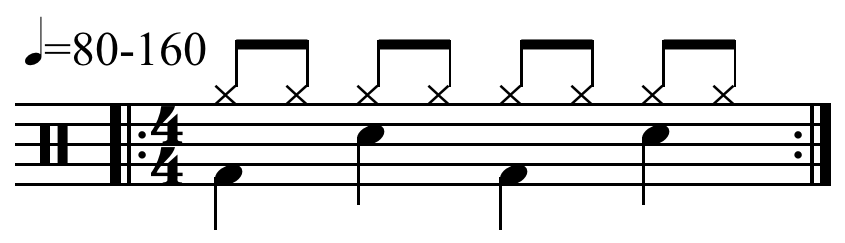
Simple quadruple drum pattern on a rock drum kit.

The neutral or percussion clef is not a true clef like the F, C, and G clefs. Rather, it assigns different unpitched percussion instruments to the lines and spaces of the staff. With the exception of some common drum-kit and marching percussion layouts, the assignment of lines and spaces to instruments is not standardised, so a legend is required to show which instrument each line or space represents. Pitched percussion instruments do not use this clef — timpani are notated in bass clef and mallet percussion instruments are noted in treble clef or on a grand staff.

If the neutral clef is used for a single percussion instrument the staff may only have one line, although other configurations are used.

The neutral clef is sometimes used where non-percussion instruments play non-pitched extended techniques, such as hitting the body of a string instrument, or having a vocal choir clap, stamp, or snap. However, it is more common to write the rhythms using × noteheads on the instrument's normal staff, with a comment to indicate the appropriate rhythmic action.

=== Tablature ===

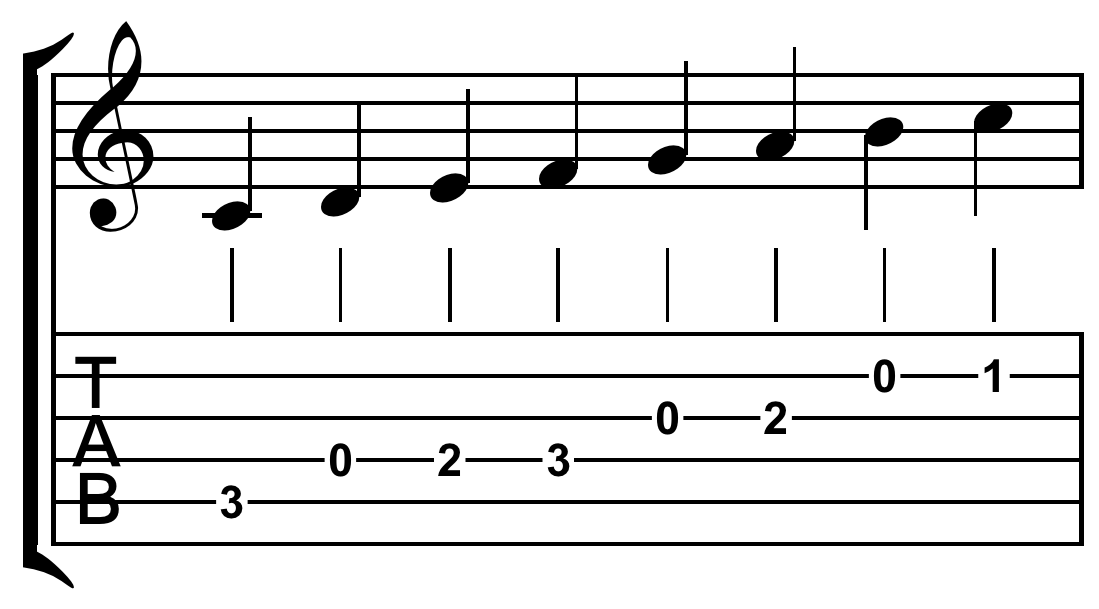
C major scale, guitar tablature and staff notation (suboctave is assumed).

For guitars and other fretted instruments, it is possible to notate tablature in place of ordinary notes. This TAB sign is not a clef — it does not indicate the placement of notes on a staff. The lines shown are not a music staff but rather represent the strings of the instrument (six lines would be used for guitar, four lines for the bass guitar, etc.), with numbers on the lines showing which fret, if any, should be used and symbols for specific techniques.

== History ==
Before the advent of clefs, the reference line of a staff was simply labeled with the name of the note it was intended to bear: F, C, or sometimes G. These were the most common 'clefs', or litterae clavis (key-letters), in Gregorian chant notation. Over time the shapes of these letters became stylised, leading to their current versions.

Many other clefs were used, particularly in the early period of chant notation, keyed to many different notes, from the low Γ (gamma, the G on the bottom line of the bass clef) to the G above middle C (written with a small letter g). These included two different lowercase b symbols for the note just below middle C: round for B♭, and square for B♮. In order of frequency of use, these clefs were: F, c, f, C, D, a, g, e, Γ, B, and the round and square b. In later medieval music, the round b was often written in addition to another clef letter to indicate that B♭ rather than B♮ was to be used throughout a piece; this is the origin of the key signature.

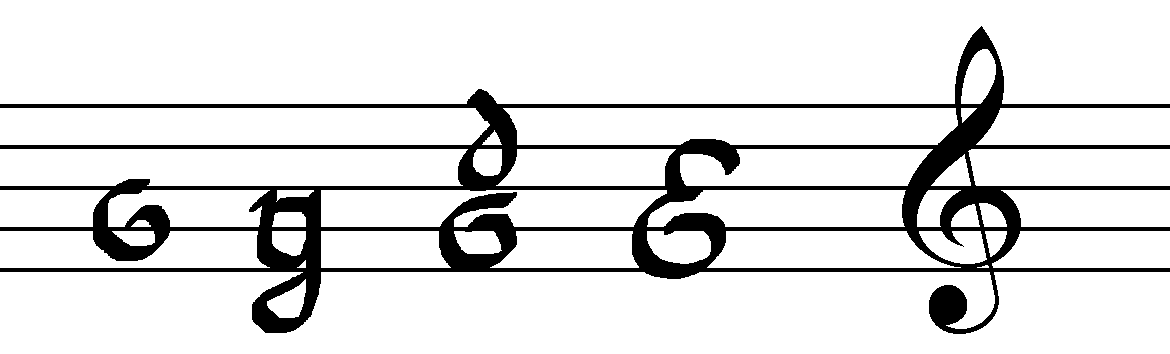
Early forms of the G clef—the third combines the G and D clefs vertically

In the polyphonic period up to 1600, unusual clefs were occasionally used for parts with extremely high or low tessituras. For very low bass parts, the Γ clef is found on the middle, fourth, or fifth lines of the staff (e.g., in Pierre de La Rue's Requiem and in a mid-16th-century dance book published by the Hessen brothers); for very high parts, the high-D clef (d), and the even higher ff clef (e.g., in the Mulliner Book) were used to represent the notes written on the fourth and top lines of the treble clef, respectively.

The practice of using different shapes for the same clef persisted until very recent times. The F-clef was, until as late as the 1980s in some cases (such as hymnals), or in British and French publications, written like this: The 2025 edition of the shape note tunebook The Sacred Harp continues to use an old-style, right-facing bass clef, following the style of nineteenth-century editions.

In printed music from the 16th and 17th centuries, the C clef often assumed a ladder-like form, in which the two horizontal rungs surround the staff line indicated as C: ; this form survived in some printed editions (class=skin-invert-image|see this example, written in four-part men's harmony and positioned to make it equivalent to an octave G clef) into the 20th century.

The C-clef was formerly written in a more angular way, sometimes still used, or, more often, as a simplified K-shape when writing the clef by hand:

In modern Gregorian chant notation the C clef is written (on a four-line staff) in the form and the F clef as

The flourish at the top of the G-clef probably derives from a cursive S for "sol", the name for "G" in fixed-do solfège.

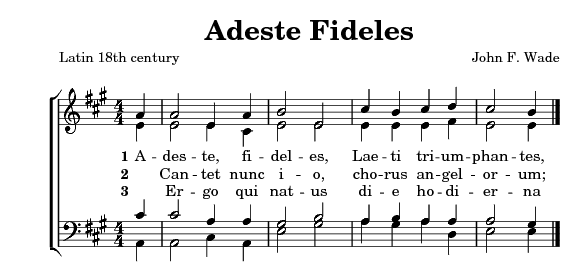
Vocal music can be contracted into two staffs, using the treble and bass clefs.

C clefs (along with G, F, Γ, D, and A clefs) were formerly used to notate vocal music. Nominally, the soprano voice parts were written in first- or second-line C clef (soprano clef or mezzo-soprano clef) or second-line G clef (treble clef), the alto or tenor voices in third-line C clef (alto clef), the tenor voice in fourth-line C clef (tenor clef) and the bass voice in third-, fourth- or fifth-line F clef (baritone, bass, or sub-bass clef).

Until the 19th century, the most common arrangement for vocal music used the following clefs:

- Soprano = soprano clef (first-line C clef)
- Alto = alto clef (third-line C clef)
- Tenor = tenor clef (fourth-line C clef)
- Bass = bass clef (fourth-line F clef)

In more modern publications, four-part music on parallel staves is usually written more simply as:

- Soprano = treble clef (second-line G clef)
- Alto = treble clef
- Tenor = treble clef with an 8 below or a double treble clef. Many pieces, particularly those from before the 21st century, use an unaltered treble clef, with the expectation the tenors will still sing an octave lower than notated.
- Bass = bass clef (fourth-line F clef)

This may be reduced to two staves, the soprano and alto sharing a staff with a treble clef, and the tenor and bass sharing a staff marked with the bass clef.

== Further uses ==
Clef combinations played a role in the modal system toward the end of the 16th century, and it has been suggested certain clef combinations in the polyphonic music of 16th-century vocal polyphony are reserved for authentic (odd-numbered) modes, and others for plagal (even-numbered) modes, but the precise implications have been the subject of much scholarly debate.

Reading music as if it were in a different clef from the one indicated can be an aid in transposing music at sight. Music for a treble-clef B♭ instrument (such as trumpet) can be read as if it were in tenor clef in concert pitch, and bass-clef concert-pitch music can be read on an E♭ instrument as if it were in treble clef. In both of these cases, key signatures and accidentals need to be adjusted.

== In Unicode ==
For use with computer systems, the Unicode Consortium has created code points for twelve different clef symbols as part of a repertoire called the "Musical Symbols" block. Although much of the list was established by 1999, general provision of these symbols in common computer fonts remains rather limited. (Note: Suitable fonts include Noto Music.) The clef symbols provided are these:

- U+1D11E 𝄞 MUSICAL SYMBOL G CLEF
- U+1D11F 𝄟 MUSICAL SYMBOL G CLEF OTTAVA ALTA
- U+1D120 𝄠 MUSICAL SYMBOL G CLEF OTTAVA BASSA
- U+1D121 𝄡 MUSICAL SYMBOL C CLEF
- U+1D122 𝄢 MUSICAL SYMBOL F CLEF
- U+1D123 𝄣 MUSICAL SYMBOL F CLEF OTTAVA ALTA
- U+1D124 𝄤 MUSICAL SYMBOL F CLEF OTTAVA BASSA
- U+1D125 𝄥 MUSICAL SYMBOL DRUM CLEF-1
- U+1D126 𝄦 MUSICAL SYMBOL DRUM CLEF-2
- U+1D1D0 𝇐 MUSICAL SYMBOL GREGORIAN C CLEF
- U+1D1D1 𝇑 MUSICAL SYMBOL GREGORIAN F CLEF
- U+1D1DE 𝇞 MUSICAL SYMBOL KIEVAN C CLEF
