= Rod Mason =

English jazz musician

- Born: Rod Mason; 28 September 1940; Plymouth, England
- Died: 8 January 2017 (aged 76) Neuss, Germany
- Genres: Trad jazz
- Occupation: Musician
- Instruments: Trumpet; Cornet; Vocals
- Years active: 1950s–2017

Rod Mason (28 September 1940 – 8 January 2017) was an English musician (trumpet, cornet, vocals) who played trad jazz.

== Biography ==
Mason was born in Plymouth, England. As a young man he played with the local Tamar Valley Jazz Band, in which his father, Frank "Pop" Mason, had played drums. His father and mother Gwen, ran the family soft drinks company Mason's Minerals. At Kelly College, in Tavistock, Mason played the bugle with the cadet corps, after which he developed a keen interest in a spare valve trombone. He played this in his father's band until the trumpet player left; Mason replaced him using a brass-band style cornet.

From 1959 to 1960, Mason played briefly with the Cy Laurie band. In 1962, when Monty Sunshine left the Chris Barber band to form his own group, Sunshine hired Mason on the recommendation of Kenny Ball. In the mid-1960s after leaving Sunshine, he worked in the family business and played occasionally, until a winning appearance on Hughie Green's Opportunity Knocks TV talent show which led to a flood of offers. A facial paralysis forced him to use other mouthpieces, which allowed him to extend the range of his instrument. In 1965, he founded his own band, and from 1970 he played in the Acker Bilk's Paramount Jazz Band, before he founded a band together with Ian Wheeler in 1973. This was a band with musicians such as Brian Lemon, Dick Wellstood or Bob Wilber. He recorded numerous recordings for the Reef label. From 1980, Mason played in the Dutch Swing College Band. In 1985, he founded Hot Five band, with which he released a number of albums for Timeless Records and regularly toured Europe. Mason is according to Digby Fairweather "a world-class trumpeter [...] with a phenomenal versatility, unlimited endurance and the frightening ability to sound like Louis Armstrong." In later life he lived with his wife Ingrid in Kaarst, Germany.

== Personal life and death ==
Mason had a keen interest in both motorcars and motorcycles which led to a separate career as a speedway rider. He represented Plymouth on cinder tracks all over the UK although, as a result, suffered many minor injuries which made him decide to remain with music. He played his last gig in Kaarst, Germany in December 2016 and died three weeks later, after developing peritonitis and pneumonia. His son, Timmy, predeceased him. He is survived by Ingrid and his other son, Simon.

== Discography ==
- By The Beautiful Sea 1970
- Golden Hour Of Mr. Acker Bilk
- Rod Mason – Ian Wheeler 1974
- Rod Mason Featuring BAD JOKE 1975
- Giants Of Jazz 1976
- Salute To Satchmo 1976
- Dogging’ Around in Dixie 1976
- Dr. Jazz 1976
- Good Companions 1977
- Meet Me Where They Play The Blues 1977
- Jazz at the Strathallan 1977
- Carry me back 1978
- Great having you around 1978
- Stars Fell On Alabama 1979
- After Hours at the North Sea Jazz Festival 1979
- Six For Two 1979
- The Last Concert 1979
- Digital Dixie 1981
- Digital Dutch 1982
- Come Back, Sweet Papa 1984
- Jazz Holiday 1985
- The Pearls 1986
- Rod Mason Hot Five 1986
- Rod Mason's Hot Music 1988
- Rod Mason And his Hot Five featuring Angela Brown 1990
- Top 8 – Jazz Gala 1990
- I love Jazz 1992
- Ian Wheller at Farnham Meltings 1993
- 10 Years Rod Mason's Hot Five – Things We Have Done For Jazz 1994
- Merry Christmas 1994
- Red sails in the sunset 1999
- 100 Years Louis Armstrong 2000

== Bibliography ==
- Ian Carr, Digby Fairweather, Brian Priestley: Jazz Rough Guide. Stuttgart 1999, ISBN 3-476-01584-X
