= Gabriel Rosati =

Italian-born musician (born 1966)

Gabriel Oscar Rosati (born 4 August 1966 in Modena, Italy), also credited as Oscar Gabriel Rosati, is an Italian-born trumpeter, trombonist, composer, arranger and author of instructional music books, working mainly in Latin jazz, Brazilian and Afro-Cuban styles.

His books, play-along collections and recordings have been issued by Mel Bay, ADG Productions, Charles Colin, Dorn Publications, Carisch, Edizioni Curci, Edizioni Notami, Music Minus One and Hal Leonard.

Rosati lived in the United States during the 1990s, working as a freelance musician in California and Las Vegas. He leads the Brazilatafro Project.

== Early life ==
Rosati played trumpet in ensembles including the Pescara Academy orchestra, the Swiss Youth Orchestra and the Carabinieri band, according to a biography he submitted to All About Jazz. In 1990 he studied arranging, combo playing and lead trumpet in Los Angeles. According to the author biography in his book The Salsa Trumpet, before moving to the United States he collaborated in Italy with Pino Daniele, Vinicio Capossela and Fred Bongusto.

== Career ==
From 1990 to 1997 Rosati lived in the United States and worked as a freelance musician. His published biographies list performances and recordings during this period with Santana, Billy Preston, Malo, Tierra, Oreste Vilatos, John Handy, Os Originais do Samba, the John Coppola Jazz Orchestra, the Checkmates, the San Francisco All Star Big Band, Carl Fontana, Don Menza, Gregg Allman, and the blues musicians Deacon Jones, John Lee Hooker and Willy King, as well as participation in the Nike Brasil Soccer Team World Tour.

Between 1994 and 1997 he worked in Las Vegas as a lead trumpeter in shows and toured Japan with Sergio Alberti's Lemon Merengue Show. He was also the opening act for three months at the Ritz-Carlton hotel in Osaka with his own jazz group. In 1997 he arranged and conducted a tribute to Pérez Prado in Pescara, Italy, with an all-star band that included former members of the Pérez Prado Orchestra.

In 2000-2001 Rosati was based in Miami, where, according to his biographies, he was a trumpeter with Mariachi Universal and Mariachi America Internacional (2001) and performed with Frankie Marcos's group Clouds.

Between 2011 and 2013 Rosati toured Europe with the Brazilatafro Project, with performances in Italy, Hungary, Romania, Serbia, Germany, Austria and Slovenia. In 2011 he toured South America as lead trumpet with the Crystal Symphony Broadway show band. Based in the Los Angeles area until 2022, he worked, according to his biography, as a trumpeter with artists and ensembles including Angel Lebron, Tito Puente Jr., Francisco Aguabella, the Tom Kubis Big Band, Rique Pantoja, Ismael Miranda, Sonora Dinamita and Sonora Santanera; since 2022 he has been mostly back in Italy, where he teaches and performs. He has also composed music for films, jingles, industrial background music and theater.

== Teaching ==
According to his biography, Rosati has given workshops and master classes in jazz, brass technique and Afro-Cuban and Brazilian music at institutions including the Las Vegas Performing Arts Center, Fullerton College, Long Beach Polytechnic High School, California State University, Los Angeles, the Tokyo Yamaha jazz school and the Armenia Conservatory, and taught jazz trumpet at the Italian National Conservatory of Music in L'Aquila (2016-2018). His website also lists a jazz trumpet teaching position at the "P. da Palestrina" National Conservatory of Music in Cagliari.

== Brazilatafro Project ==
The Brazilatafro Project is Rosati's Latin and Brazilian jazz ensemble. According to the author biography in his book The Salsa Trumpet, he first conceived and formed the group in Las Vegas in 1995, with a repertoire that mixes Latin jazz with Brazilian and Afro-Cuban rhythms and a Mediterranean influence. A play-along CD of the group's music, with charts, was distributed with the June/July 1999 issue of Jazz Player magazine (Dorn Publications), whose cover featured the group.

== Publications ==
- Latin American Trumpet Music (Mel Bay)
- The Salsa Trumpet (Mel Bay)
- Trumpet and Organ Classics (Mel Bay)
- The Latin Brass Soloist (ADG Productions)
- The Latin Saxophone Soloist, with Darrow Hunt (ADG Productions)
- 100 Ultimate Blues Riffs for Brass Instruments (ADG Productions)
- Il Trombettista Autodidatta (Carisch)
- Claudio Roditi Solos Transcriptions (Charles Colin)
- Per chi suona la tromba and Milva Sings Piazzolla (Edizioni Curci)
- Gabriel Rosati: 100 Original Tunes for All Instruments (Music Minus One / Hal Leonard)
- Latin Big Band (Oktavian Music, 2025)
- Latin Big Band (Lead Trumpet and Soloist) (Edizioni Notami)
- Western Film Music Ltd. (Edizioni Notami)

== Recordings ==
- Mediterranean (1991) and Pacific Time (1992)
- Brazilatafro Project (Dorn Publications, 1999)
- Brazilatafro Project vol. 3 (2002)
- A New Life Start (2003)
- Dialogi & Progressus, with bassist Marcello Sebastiani (Edizioni Notami, 2020)
- Blueteko (2020) and Leonardinho (2025), both on the 88 Major Studio Label
- Gabriel Rosati & Brazilatafro Project: Live at the Philarmonic Hall in Arad (Dodicilune)

== Awards ==
- 2014: Dean Martin Prize, awarded by the Dean Martin Foundation in Pescara, Italy.
- 2018: Bronze Medal, composer/composition category, Global Music Awards, an international competition for independent musicians founded in 2011.
