= Staff (music) =

Musical notation to represent the pitch

A typical five-line staff

In Western musical notation, the staff (UK usually stave); (plural: staves), also occasionally referred to as a pentagram, is a set of horizontal lines (usually five) with spaces between them, that each represent a different musical pitch. However, in the case of a percussion staff, there may be from one to five (or perhaps more) lines which denote different percussion instruments, as may the spaces in between. In guitar tabs there are up to six (or perhaps more) lines denoting different strings.

Appropriate music symbols, depending on the intended effect, are placed on the staff with the vertical position showing their pitch, percussion instrument or string, and the horizontal position showing their approximate location in time.

The absolute pitch of each line of a pitched staff is indicated by the placement of a clef symbol at the appropriate vertical position on the left-hand side of the staff (possibly modified by conventions for specific instruments). For example, the treble clef, also known as the G clef, is placed on the second line (counting upward), fixing that line as the pitch first G above "middle C".

The lines and spaces are numbered from bottom to top; the bottom line is the first line and the top line is the fifth line.

The musical staff is analogous to a mathematical graph of pitch with respect to time. Pitches of notes are given by their vertical position on the staff and notes are played from left to right. Unlike a graph, however, the number of semitones represented by a vertical step from a line to an adjacent space depends on the key, and the exact timing of the beginning of each note is not directly proportional to its horizontal position; rather, exact timing is encoded by the musical symbol chosen for each note in addition to the tempo.

A time signature to the right of the clef indicates the relationship between timing counts and note symbols, while bar lines group notes on the staff into measures.

== Staff positions ==
Staff, with staff positions indicated

When a staff is used for pitched instruments other than guitar tab, the vertical position of the notehead on the staff indicates which note to play: higher-pitched notes are marked higher on the staff. The notehead can be placed with its center intersecting a line (on a line) or in between the lines touching the lines above and below (in a space). Notes outside the range of the staff are placed on or between ledger lines—lines the width of the note they need to hold—added above or below the staff.

Which staff positions represent which notes is determined by a clef placed at the beginning of the staff. The clef identifies a particular line as a specific note, and all other notes are determined relative to that line. For example, the treble clef puts the G above middle C on the second line. The interval between adjacent staff positions is one step in the diatonic scale. Once fixed by a clef, the notes represented by the positions on the staff can be modified by the key signature or accidentals on individual notes. A clefless staff may be used to represent a set of percussion sounds; each line typically represents a different instrument.

== Systems, braces and brackets ==
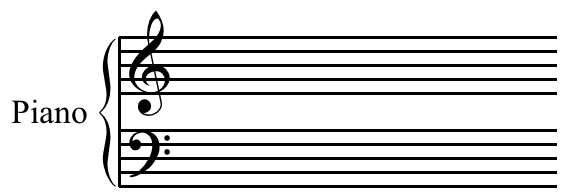
Musical brace.

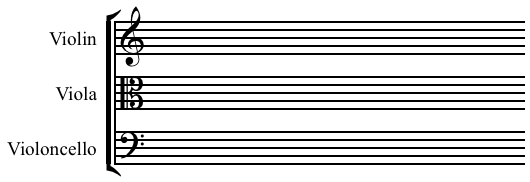
Musical bracket.

A vertical line drawn to the left of multiple staves creates a system, indicating that the music on all the staves is to be played simultaneously. A brace is used to join multiple staves that represent an instrument, such as a piano, organ, harp, or marimba. A bracket is an additional vertical line joining staves to show groupings of instruments that function as a unit, such as the string section of an orchestra. Sometimes a second bracket is used to show instruments grouped in pairs, such as the first and second oboes or first and second violins in an orchestra. In some cases, a brace is used for this purpose.

When more than one system appears on a page, often two parallel diagonal strokes are placed on the left side of the score to separate them.

Four-part SATB vocal settings, especially in hymnals, use a divisi notation on a two-staff system with soprano and alto voices sharing the upper staff and tenor and bass voices on the lower staff.

The German System (often in the combined forms Liniensystem or Notensystem) may refer to a single staff as well as to the Akkolade (from the French) or system in the English sense; the Italian term is accollatura.

== Grand staff ==
The grand staff

When music on two staves is joined by a brace, or is intended to be played at once by a single performer (usually a keyboard instrument or harp), a grand staff (American English) or great stave (British English) is created. Typically, the upper staff uses a treble clef and the lower staff has a bass clef. In this instance, middle C is centered between the two staffs, and it can be written on the first ledger line below the upper staff or the first ledger line above the lower staff. Very rarely, a centered line with a small C clef is written, and usually used to indicate that B, C, or D on the line can be played with either hand (ledger lines are not used from a center alto as this creates confusion). When playing the piano or harp, the upper staff is normally played with the right hand and the lower staff with the left hand. In music intended for organ with pedalboard, a grand staff normally comprises three staves, one for each hand on the manuals and one for the feet on the pedalboard.

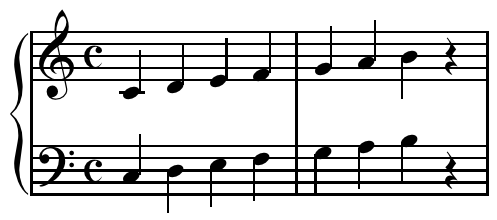
A simple grand staff. Each of the staves shown above has seven notes and one rest.

Musical keyboard and treble and bass clef

== History ==
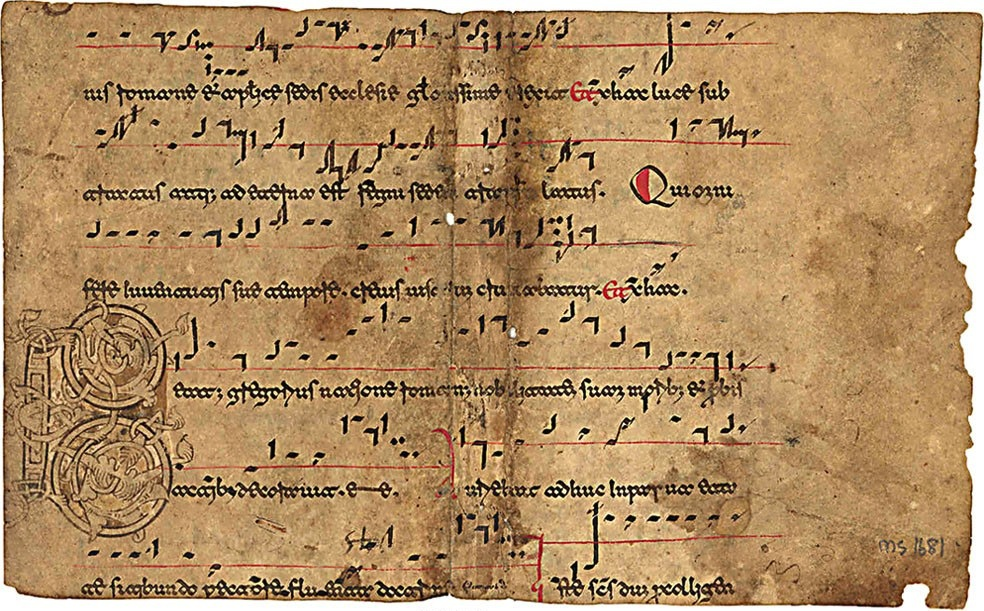
12th-century Beneventan manuscript showing diastematic neumes and a single-line staff

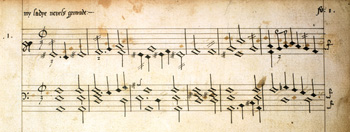
Excerpt from a keyboard work by William Byrd written on a six-line staff, 1591

Early Western medieval notation was written with neumes, which did not specify exact pitches but only the shape of the melodies, i.e. indicating when the musical line went up or down; presumably these were intended as mnemonics for melodies which had been taught by rote.

During the 9th through 11th centuries a number of systems were developed to specify pitch more precisely, including diastematic neumes whose height on the page corresponded with their absolute pitch level (Longobardian and Beneventan manuscripts from Italy show this technique around the year 1000). Digraphic notation, using letter names similar to modern note names in conjunction with the neumes, made a brief appearance in a few manuscripts, but a number of manuscripts used one or more horizontal lines to indicate particular pitches.

The treatise Musica enchiriadis (c. 900) uses Daseian notation for indicating specific pitches, but the modern use of staff lines is attributed to Guido d'Arezzo (990–1050), whose four-line staff is still used (though without the red and yellow coloring he recommended) in Gregorian chant publications today. Five-line staves appeared in Italy in the 13th century and it was promoted by Ugolino da Forlì; staves with four, five, and six lines were used as late as 1600.

== See also ==
- Tablature
- Sight reading
- Rastrum
