= Dennis Rollins =

English jazz trombonist

Dennis Rollins MBE
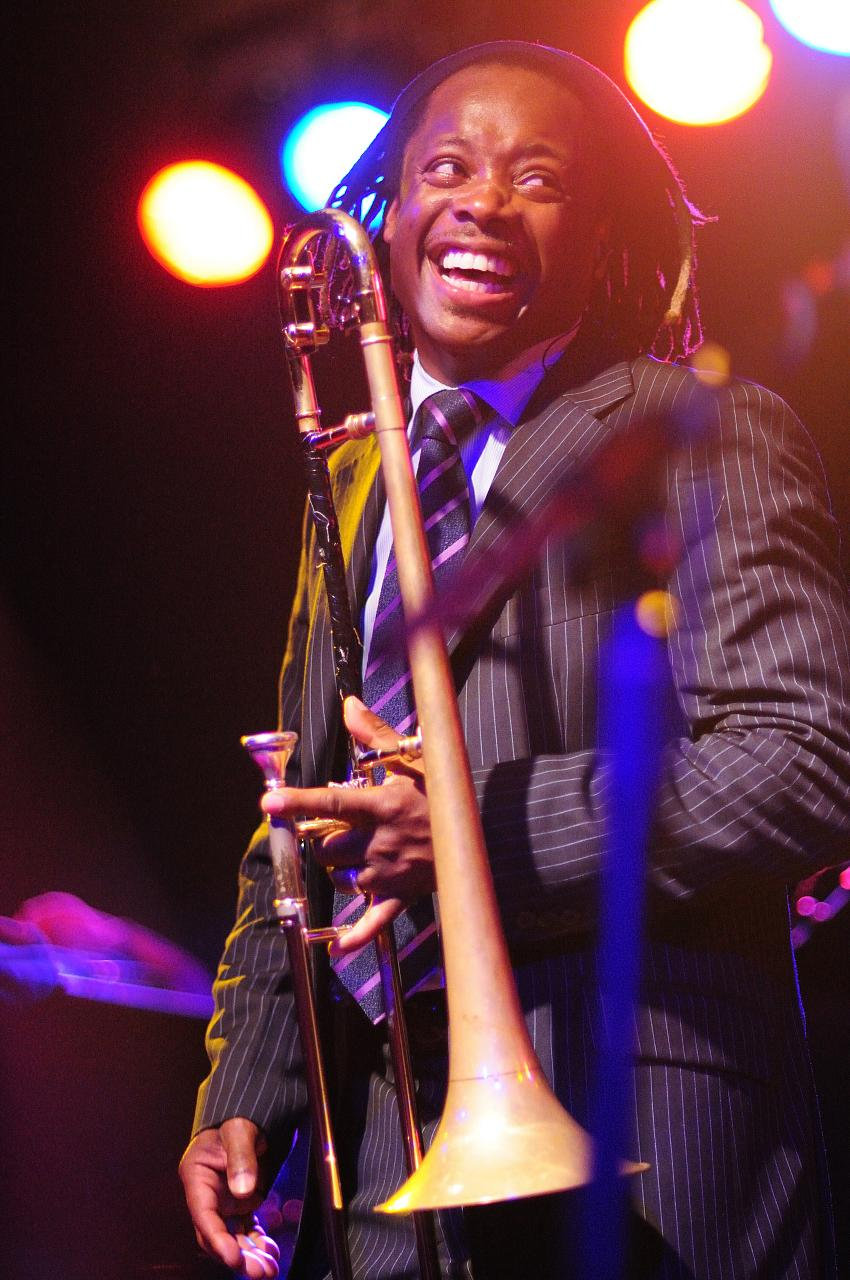
- Rollins in concert, 17 April 2008

Background information
- Born: Dennis George Rollins; 1964 (age 61–62)
- Origin: Doncaster, England
- Genres: Jazz, pop, jazz-funk
- Occupations: Musician, bandleader, record producer
- Instrument: Trombone
- Years active: c. 1984 - present
- Label: Motéma Music
- Website: http://www.dennisrollins.com/ Dennis Rollins.com

Dennis Rollins, MBE (born 1964) is a British jazz trombonist, the founder and bandleader of BadBone and Co. Dennis is also Patron of NewJazz5 in Lincoln who organise the Annual Lincoln Jazz Festival

== Early life and career ==
Dennis George Rollins was born in Birmingham, England, of Jamaican parents, and raised in Bentley, Doncaster, where he attended Don Valley High School. When he was 14 years old, he joined The Doncaster Youth Jazz Association, with which he studied and performed for some years before moving to London in 1987.

Rollins has recorded, performed, and toured with a host of musicians and bands in jazz and pop, including Courtney Pine, and Maceo Parker.

In 1995 he formed his own jazz-funk band, Dee Roe, with which he performed at such venues as the Jazz Café, Ronnie Scott's Jazz Club, the London Forum, and Brixton Academy.

In 2000 he again formed a band, the quintet Dennis Rollins' BadBone and Co., launched at the Barbican Centre in March of that year, again specialising in funk-inflected jazz.

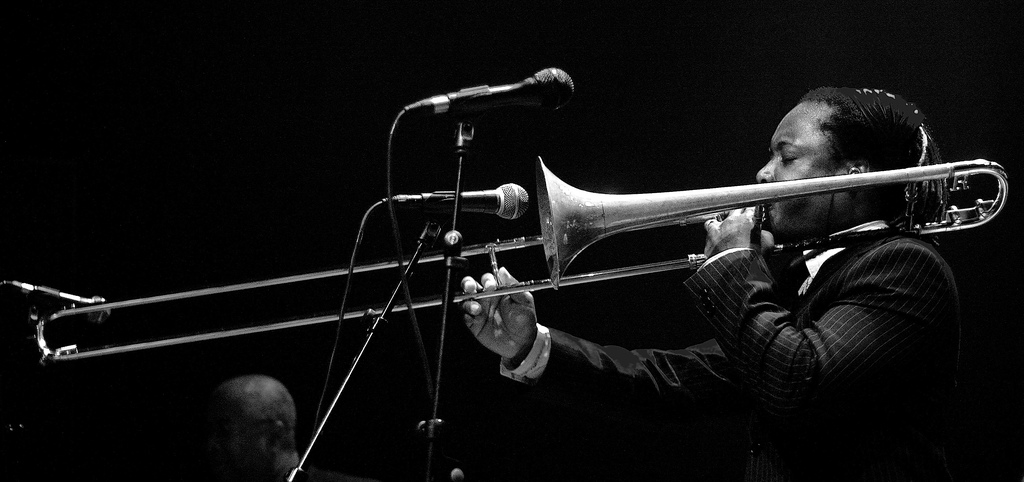
Rollins with trombone, 2008

In 2005 he formed Boneyard, an ensemble featuring 10 trombones, sousaphone (or "sousabone"), and drums; this band performed a series of live gigs throughout the U.K. that summer as well as a performance on BBC Radio 3. Boneyard featured the British jazz trombonists Barnaby Dickinson, Matt Colman, Julian Hepple, Andy Derrick, Kevin Holborough, Harry Brown, and Lee Hallam, with Andy Grappy on sousaphone.

Current band members of Badbone&co are: Jay Phelps on trumpet, Johnny Heyes on guitars, Courtney Thomas on bass, Ross Stanley on keys and Jack Pollit on drums.

Rollins is an artist/clinician for Michael Rath Trombones. His personal instrument is a yellow brass/nickel silver Rath R3.

In the 2018 Queen's Birthday Honours list Rollins was awarded an MBE for services to music.

== Recordings (as leader) ==
- 2000: Wild & Free (E.P.)
- 2001: BadBone
- 2003: Make Your Move
- 2006: Big Night Out
- 2011: "The 11th Gate"

== Literature ==
- John Chilton, Who's Who of British Jazz, Continuum International Publishing Group, 2004, ISBN 0-8264-7234-6
