= Elias Faingersh =

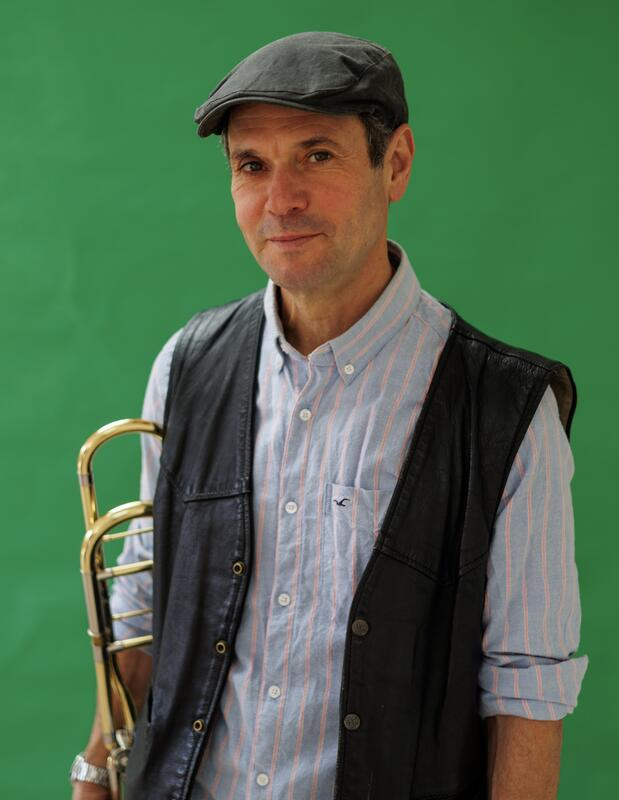

Background information
- Born: 8 December 1967 (age 58); Moscow, Soviet Union
- Occupation: Musician
- Instrument: trombone
- Website: www.trombonemagic.com

Elias Faingersh (born 1967 in Moscow, Soviet Union) is a Swedish trombonist, composer, actor, and director of Jewish origin.

== Biography ==
Faingersh was born in Moscow. Graduated from the Malmö Conservatory and the Manhattan School of Music.

Upon returning to Sweden, he embarked on a solo artistic path, developing a unique stage format that incorporates loop technology, live sampling, and narrative performance. Faingersh is best known for his one-man shows, in which he combines live music with personal storytelling and multimedia elements. His performances often explore themes of identity, fatherhood, artistic freedom, and modern life.

Faingersh's artistic style blends classical music, jazz, improvisation, and contemporary performance art. Using live-looping technology, he creates layered soundscapes, producing an orchestral experience from a single instrument—the trombone.

Elias Faingersh and Victoria Borisova-Ollas created the unique Hamlet – A Drama for Trombone and Orchestra in 2007. The composition was commissioned by the Malmö Symphony Orchestra, and the premiere took place on June 15, 2008, conducted by Lawrence Renes, with Faingersh as the soloist. He composed and performed “Romeo Dreaming”, a theatrical trombone piece presented with the percussion ensemble Kroumata. It has been staged in both Stockholm and Malmö, and even broadcast on Swedish national television.

"A Solo from the Pit" is a one-man musical stand-up show by virtuoso trombonist Elias Faingersh. It combines personal storytelling with highlights from famous operas (e.g., Carmen, Tosca, Traviata, Madame Butterfly, Aida). In the production of King Lear by Belarus Free Theatre, Elias Faingersh plays the Musical Fool.

His performances have been acclaimed at international festivals in Berlin, Copenhagen, Riga, and cities across the United States and Canada. In addition to his stage work, Faingersh has composed music for more than 30 theater productions as well as for film, television, and radio. His work has been recognized with awards at festivals in Saint Petersburg, Kosovo, North Macedonia, and Hanover. "The Ugly Duckling", performed at the Royal Danish Opera for H.C. Andersson's 200th anniversary in front of all of the European royalty. In November, 2018 the show “A Solo From the Pit” ran Off-Broadway.
