= Alto trombone =

Musical instrument in the trombone family

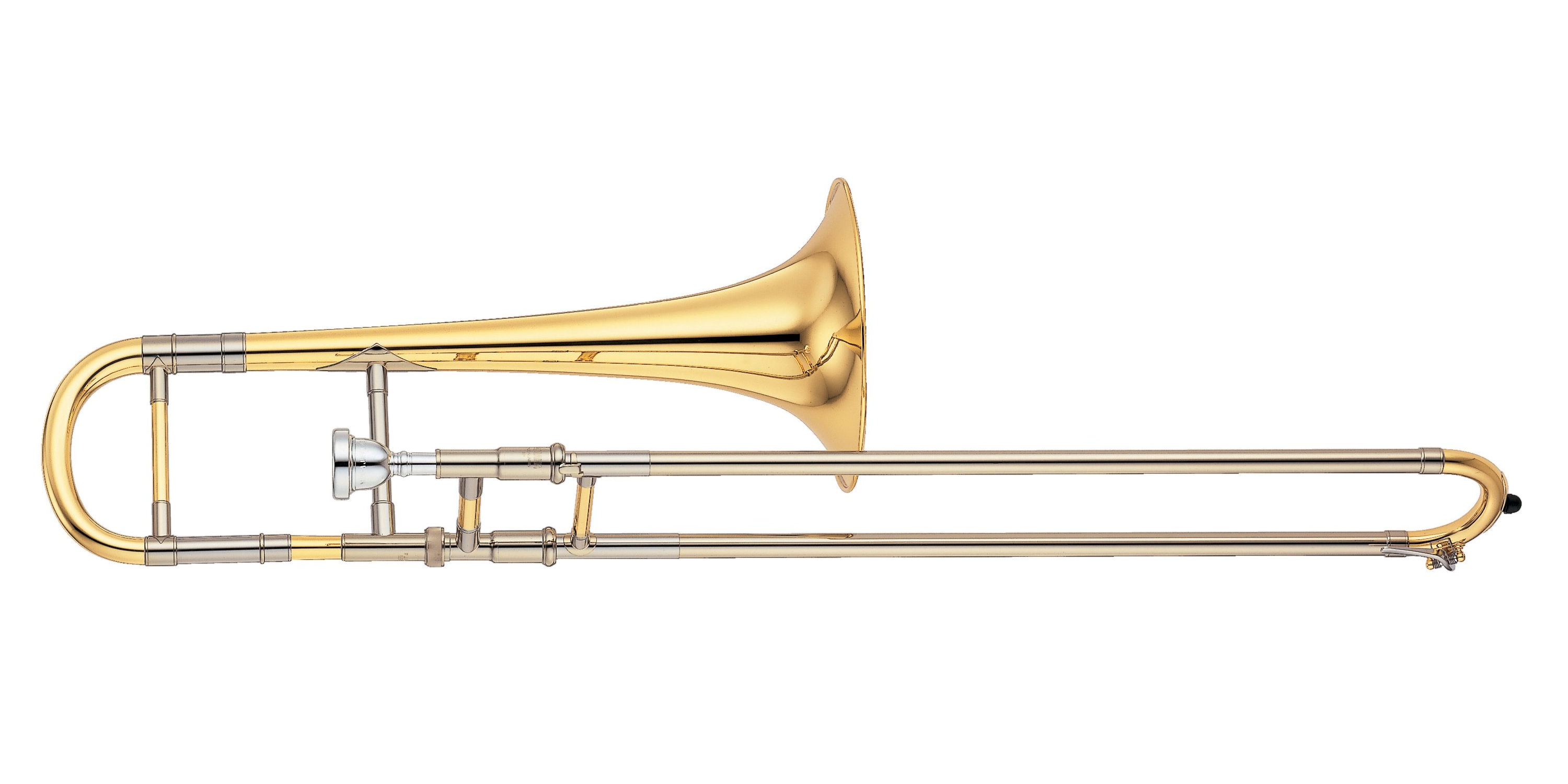
- Alto trombone in E♭

Brass instrument
- Classification: Wind; Brass; Aerophone
- Hornbostel–Sachs classification: 423.22 (Sliding aerophone sounded by lip vibration)
- Developed: Late 16th century

Playing range
- Range of the E♭ alto trombone; see Range for more details.

Related instruments
- Trombone; Sackbut

The alto trombone (German: Altposaune, Italian, French: trombone alto) is the alto member of the trombone family of brass instruments, smaller than the tenor trombone. It is almost always pitched in E♭ a fourth higher than the tenor, although examples pitched in F are occasionally found. The alto trombone was commonly used from the 16th to the 18th centuries in church music to strengthen the alto voice, particularly in the Mass. Alto trombone parts are usually notated in alto clef.

== History ==
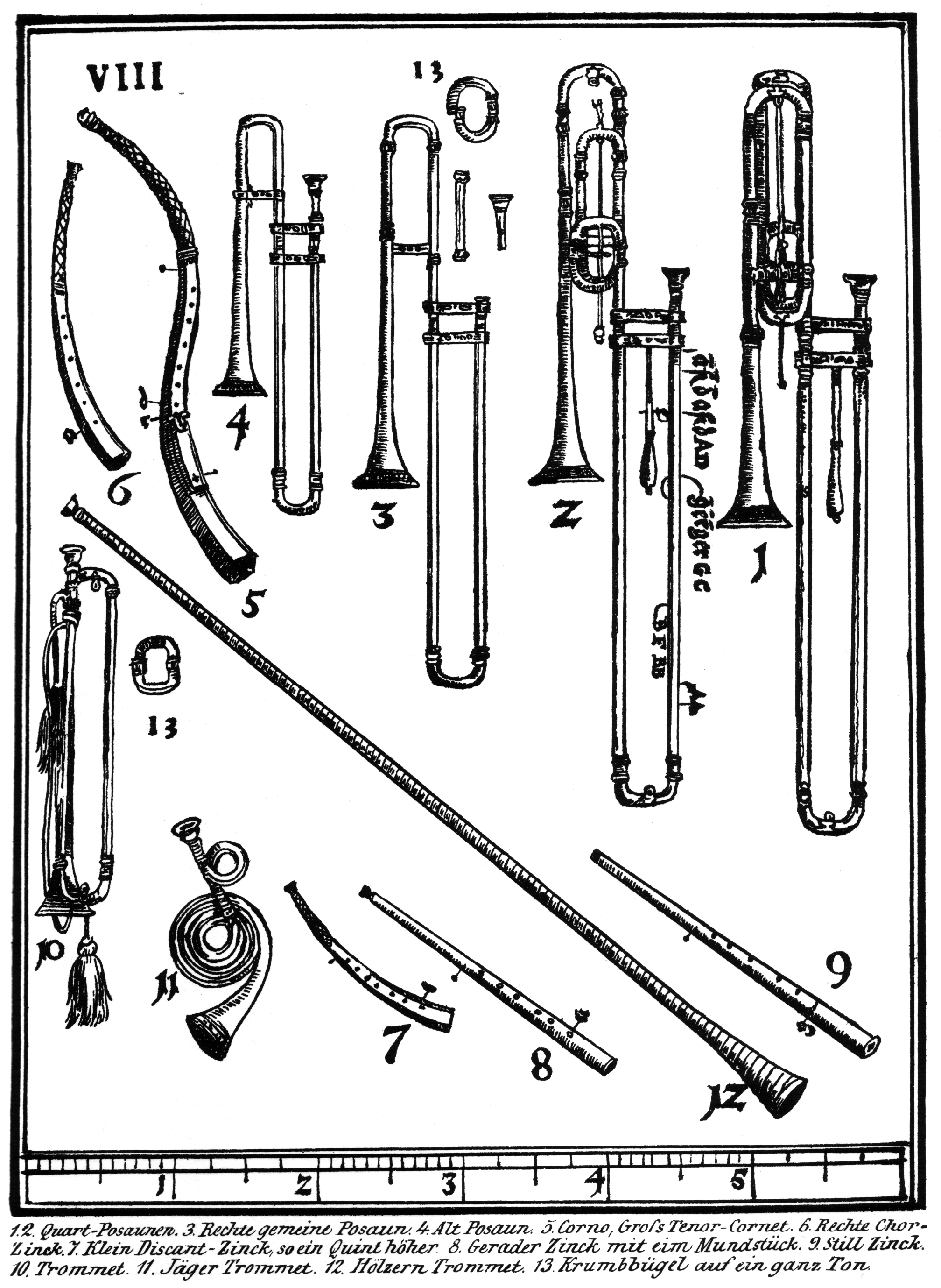
Trombones in Syntagma Musicum (1614–20), by Michael Praetorius, including an alto trombone.

Although the trombone first appeared in its earliest sackbut form in the 15th century, the exact origin of the smaller alto sized instrument is unclear. The first documented mentions of an alto trombone are in 1590 in Aurelio Virgiliano's Il Dolcimelo, and in Syntagma Musicum (1614–20) by Michael Praetorius, which includes an illustration of an alto trombone in volume II, De Organographia. The earliest surviving alto dates from around 1652 and is held by St. Mary's Church, Gdańsk.

The alto trombone appears in the earliest written music for trombone, where composers wrote alto, tenor, and bass parts to bolster the corresponding voices in church liturgical music. Although the parts were notated in alto, tenor and bass clefs, historically the clef has not always been a reliable indicator of which type of trombone was actually used in performance.

=== 18th century Vienna ===
Until the mid-1900s little was known about trombone repertoire from the 18th century. The discovery of repertoire and information regarding the Austrian alto trombone virtuoso Thomas Gschladt demonstrates the alto trombone enjoyed a period of popularity between 1756 and 1780. In the 1960s an incomplete concerto by Georg Christoph Wagenseil (1715–1777) was recorded by conductor Nikolaus Harnoncourt: this concerto demands advanced technique from the performer and is the first known concerto for the trombone. Shortly after this recording was released, another concerto was discovered, this one written by Leopold Mozart. Due to the advanced technique in this concerto, particularly lip trills, it was considered too difficult for the trombone and musicologists concluded that it was most likely written for the French horn. New information regarding Gschladt demonstrates that music of this difficulty was written for the alto trombone during the mid-to-late 18th century and also showed music which was previously thought impossible on the instrument was playable. Like Bach's trumpet soloist Gottfried Reiche and Mozart's horn soloist, Joseph Leutgeb, Gschladt represented the best of contemporary trombone soloists. Gschladt was very close to Leopold Mozart who wrote a Serenade especially to be performed only by him—when Gschladt was unavailable Mozart preferred using a viola soloist instead.

In addition to Leopold Mozart and Wagenseil, Michael Haydn's Serenade in D (1764) with its extended range, trills, technique, and endurance demands contributes to this idea that there was perhaps a golden age of the alto trombone between 1756 and 1780 and was this piece was also most likely written for Thomas Gschladt. The Serenade joins these few works that remain from an era of alto trombone virtuosity.

=== Decline of use in the 19th century ===
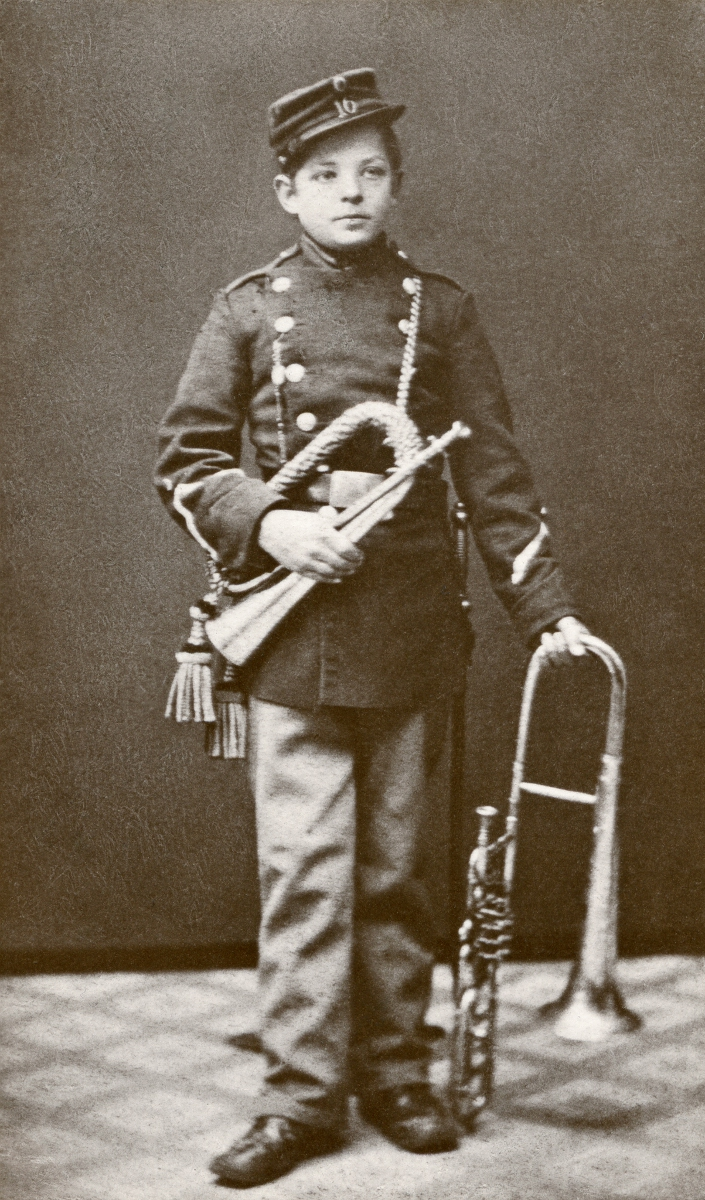
Carl Nielsen aged 14 in band uniform with bugle and valve alto trombone, Denmark, 1879.

Berlioz was influential in the 19th century in the ascension of the tenor trombone and valved brass instruments in France. By the 1840s the alto was nearly obsolete in France and England. In Italy and many other parts of Europe, valve trombones rapidly became the norm and displaced slide trombones, including the alto. Improvements in instruments and performance technique meant that tenor trombone players were increasingly able to play first trombone parts intended for alto, and the alto was regarded as an outmoded upper-register tool.

=== Modern revival ===
While some first trombonists continued to use the alto trombone as indicated, it was unfashionable in orchestras until the late 20th century, when it began to enjoy something of a revival. Contemporary composers have written solo works for the alto trombone, including Eric Ewazen, Christian Lindberg, Torsten Nilsson, and Jan Sandström.

== Construction ==
The bore of an alto trombone is intermediate between a trumpet and a tenor trombone, and similar to that of a small-bore tenor, usually around 0.450 to 0.500 inches (11.4 to 12.7 mm) with a 6 1/2 or 7 inches (17 or 18 cm) bell.

Modern instruments are sometimes fitted with a valve to lower the pitch, either by a semitone to D (known as a "trill" valve), or by a fourth into B♭, analogous to the B♭/F valve configuration found on tenor and bass trombones. The B♭ valve makes alternative slide positions available for notes in longer positions, and allows the range above the pedals to extend from A_{2} down to F_{2}.

Many manufacturers offer an alto model in their trombone range, including Yamaha, Bach, Conn, SE Shires, Thein, Rath, and others.

Alto valve trombones in E♭ have occasionally been built but remain rare items, usually in museums.

== Characteristics and range ==
Range of the E♭ alto trombone. While a valve in B♭ extends range down to F_{2} it is mainly useful to provide alternate positions for the middle register. Pedals E♭_{2}–A_{1} are possible but seldom used.

The tessitura of the E♭ alto trombone is A_{2} to E♭_{5}, although it rarely strays below E♭_{3} in classical repertoire. In good hands the range can extend as high as G_{5}. Pedal tones can be produced from E♭_{2} to A_{1} but are seldom called for.

Since the slide is shorter than the B♭ tenor and bass trombones, the seven slide positions are proportionally closer together. A B♭ valve attachment extends the low range below the A_{2} in seventh position to F_{2}, although it is most useful for providing convenient alternate slide positions for notes in the middle register, allowing the player to avoid the longest 6th and 7th positions.

The timbre of the alto is brighter than that of the tenor or bass trombone, and constitutes its principal strength and point of difference.

== Repertoire ==
The alto trombone has primarily been used in choral, orchestral and operatic settings, and came to some prominence in the early 19th century, particularly in the symphonies of Schubert, Schumann, Brahms and Mendelssohn. Since the 18th century in Vienna, it has also enjoyed a history as a solo instrument.

Modern composers have rediscovered the instrument and the alto trombone has begun making more appearances in modern small-scale compositions. Britten used alto trombone in his 1966 chamber opera The Burning Fiery Furnace. Today, first-chair professional orchestral tenor trombonists are expected to play the alto trombone when required.

Notable works scored for this instrument are listed in the following table.

Composer	Work	Year	Type
Monteverdi	L'Orfeo	1607	opera
J. S. Bach	Christ lag in Todes Banden, BWV 4	1707	cantata
J. S. Bach	Aus tiefer Not schrei ich zu dir, BWV 38	1724	cantata
Gluck	Alceste	1767	opera
W. A. Mozart	Great Mass in C minor	1782–1783 (unfinished)	concert mass
W. A. Mozart	Requiem	1791 (unfinished)	concert mass
W. A. Mozart	Don Giovanni	1787	opera
W. A. Mozart	Idomeneo	1781	opera
W. A. Mozart	The Magic Flute	1791	opera
Haydn	The Creation	1796–1798	oratorio
Haydn	The Seasons	1801	oratorio
Beethoven	Symphony No. 5	1804–1808	symphony
Beethoven	Symphony No. 6	1804–1808	symphony
Beethoven	Symphony No. 9	1817–1824	symphony
Beethoven	Missa Solemnis	1823	concert mass
Spohr	Faust	1813, revised 1852	opera
Spohr	Jessonda	1822	opera
Schubert	Symphony No. 7	1821 (unfinished)	symphony
Schubert	Symphony No. 8 "Unfinished"	1822 (unfinished)	symphony
Schubert	Symphony No. 9 "The Great"	1826–1827	symphony
Schubert	Mass No. 5 in A♭ major	1822	concert mass
Schubert	Mass No. 6 in E♭ major	1828	concert mass
Berlioz	Symphonie fantastique	1830	symphony
F. Mendelssohn	Lobgesang ("Symphony No. 2")	1840	symphony-cantata
F. Mendelssohn	Symphony No. 5 "Reformation"	1830	symphony
F. Mendelssohn	Elijah	1846	oratorio
F. Mendelssohn	Overture in C minor "Ruy Blas"	1839	overture
Schumann	Symphony No. 1 "Spring"	1841	symphony
Schumann	Symphony No. 2	1845–1846	symphony
Schumann	Symphony No. 3 "Rhenish"	1850	symphony
Schumann	Symphony No. 4	1841, revised 1851	symphony
Brahms	Symphony No. 1	1876	symphony
Brahms	Symphony No. 2	1877	symphony
Brahms	Symphony No. 3	1883	symphony
Brahms	Symphony No. 4	1885	symphony
Brahms	Academic Festival Overture	1880	overture
Brahms	Tragic Overture	1880	overture
Brahms	Ein Deutsches Requiem	1868	vocal/orchestral work
Schoenberg	Gurre-Lieder	1911	vocal/orchestral work
Schoenberg	Pelleas und Melisande	1903	symphonic poem
Berg	Wozzeck	1922	opera
Berg	Three Pieces for Orchestra	1913–1915	orchestral work
Stravinsky	Threni	1958	vocal/orchestral work

== Bibliography ==
- Herbert, Trevor (2006). The Trombone. Yale Musical Instrument Series. New Haven: Yale University Press. ISBN 978-0-300-23575-3. OCLC 1007305405. OL 30593699M. Wikidata Q111039091.
- Herbert, Trevor; Myers, Arnold; Wallace, John, eds. (2019). The Cambridge Encyclopedia of Brass Instruments. Cambridge University Press. doi:10.1017/9781316841273. ISBN 978-1-316-63185-0. OL 34730943M. Wikidata Q136027509.
- Yeo, Douglas (2021). An Illustrated Dictionary for the Modern Trombone, Tuba, and Euphonium Player. Dictionaries for the Modern Musician. Illustrator: Lennie Peterson. Lanham: Rowman & Littlefield. ISBN 978-1-5381-5966-8. LCCN 2021020757. OCLC 1249799159. OL 34132790M. Wikidata Q111040546.
