= Katie Melua discography =

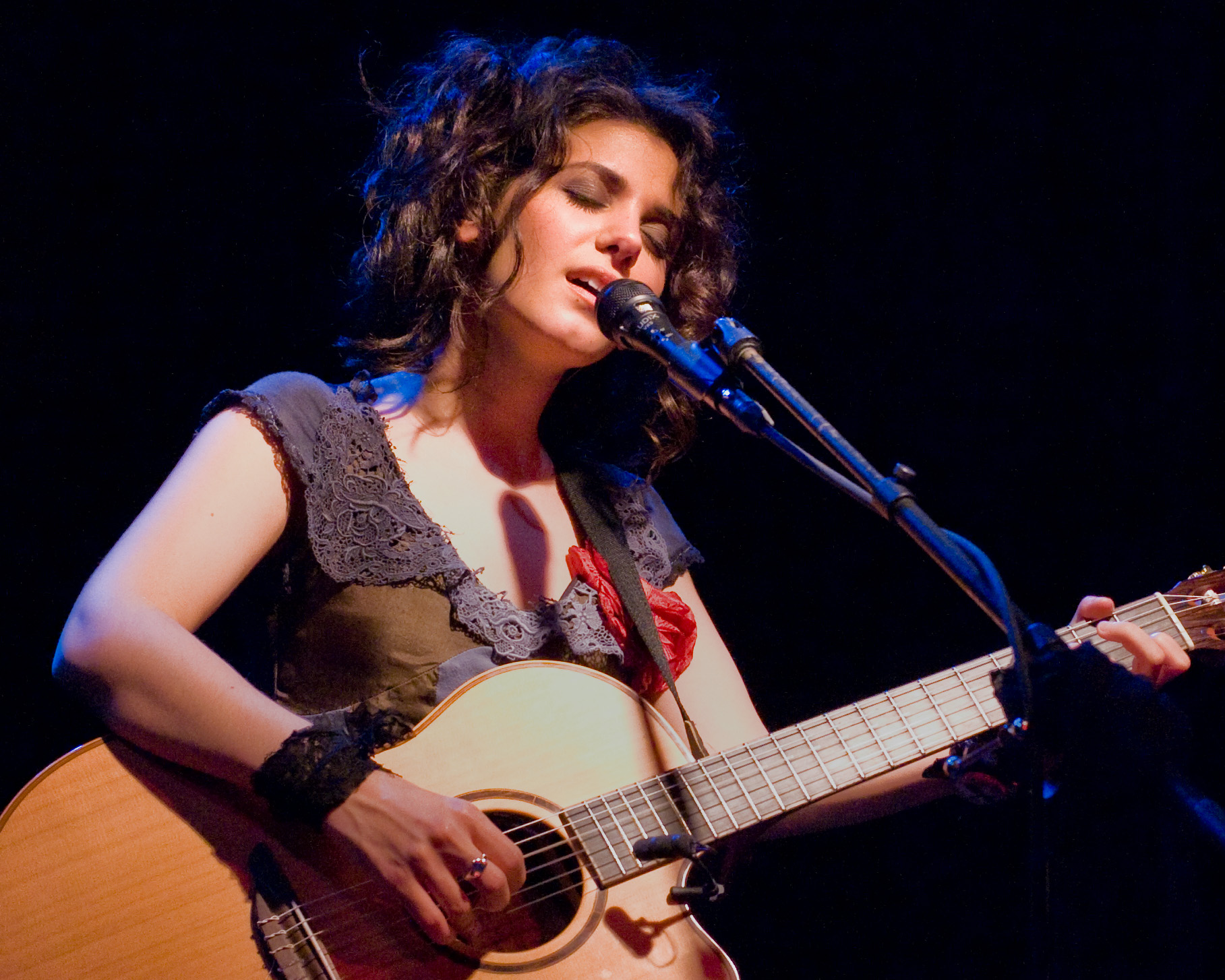
- Katie Melua at Tractor Tavern, Seattle, Washington, May 2009
- Studio albums: 9
- Extended plays: 1
- Live albums: 3
- Compilation albums: 2
- Singles: 13
- Video albums: 2

The following is the discography of British singer Katie Melua.

== Albums ==
=== Studio albums ===
List of albums, with selected chart positions
| Title | Album details | Peak chart positions | | | | | | | | | | Sales | Certifications |
| Title | Album details | UK | BEL | DEN | FRA | GER | IRL | NLD | NOR | POL | SWI | Sales | Certifications |
|---|---|---|---|---|---|---|---|---|---|---|---|---|---|
| Call Off the Search | Released: 3 November 2003; Label: Dramatico; Format: CD, digital download | 1 | 76 | 1 | 41 | 8 | 2 | 6 | 2 | 19 | 29 | UK: 1,900,000; FRA: 100,000; NOR: 145,000 | BPI: 6× Platinum; BVMI: 2× Platinum; IFPI DEN: 2× Platinum; IFPI NOR: Platinum; IFPI SWI: Platinum; NVPI: Platinum |
| Piece by Piece | Released: 26 September 2005; Label: Dramatico; Format: CD, digital download | 1 | 4 | 1 | 9 | 2 | 2 | 1 | 1 | 1 | 3 | FRA: 250,000; GER: 1,000,000; NLD: 400,000; NOR: 175,000 | BPI: 4× Platinum; BRMA: Platinum; BVMI: 4× Platinum; IFPI DEN: 4× Platinum; IFPI NOR: Platinum; IFPI SWI: 3× Platinum; IRMA: 4× Platinum; NVPI: 2× Platinum; SNEP: 3× Platinum; ZPAV: 2× Platinum |
| Pictures | Released: 1 October 2007; Label: Dramatico; Format: CD, digital download | 2 | 2 | 2 | 4 | 2 | 6 | 1 | 2 | 3 | 1 | | BPI: Platinum; BRMA: Gold; BVMI: Platinum; IFPI DEN: Platinum; IFPI SWI: 2× Platinum; IRMA: Gold; NVPI: Platinum; SNEP: Platinum |
| The House | Released: 24 May 2010; Label: Dramatico; Format: CD, digital download | 4 | 1 | 2 | 5 | 3 | 18 | 3 | 3 | 1 | 1 | FRA: 50,000 | BPI: Gold; BRMA: Gold; BVMI: Gold; IFPI SWI: Platinum; ZPAV: Platinum |
| Secret Symphony | Released: 5 March 2012; Label: Dramatico; Format: CD | 8 | 4 | 4 | 7 | 2 | 23 | 6 | 6 | 1 | 2 | FRA: 40,000 | BPI: Gold; BVMI: Gold; IFPI DEN: Gold; ZPAV: Platinum |
| Ketevan | Released: 16 September 2013; Label: Dramatico; Format: Digital download, CD | 6 | 8 | 2 | 9 | 6 | 38 | 5 | 12 | 6 | 6 | FRA: 27,000 | BPI: Silver |
| In Winter | Released: 14 October 2016; Label: BMG; Format: Digital download, CD | 9 | 21 | — | 29 | 10 | — | 17 | 7 | 13 | 4 | | BPI: Silver |
| Album No. 8 | Released: 16 October 2020; Acoustic version November 2021; Label: BMG; Format: Digital download, CD, Vinyl | 7 | 33 | — | 57 | 5 | — | 38 | — | 12 | 2 | | |
| Love & Money | Released: 24 March 2023; Label: BMG; Format: Digital download, CD, Vinyl | 35 | 67 | — | 91 | 9 | — | 77 | — | 25 | 7 | | |
"—" denotes album that did not chart or was not released in that territory.

=== Live albums ===
List of albums, with selected chart positions
| Title | Album details | Peak chart positions | | | | | | |
| Title | Album details | UK | BEL | DEN | FRA | GER | NLD | SWI |
|---|---|---|---|---|---|---|---|---|
| Live at the O² Arena | Released: 18 May 2009; Label: Dramatico; Format: CD, digital download, vinyl | 111 | 52 | 35 | 52 | 36 | 43 | 14 |
| Live in Concert (featuring Gori Women's Choir) | Released: 13 December 2019; Label: BMG; Format: CD, digital download, streaming | — | — | — | — | 83 | — | — |
| Live at the Royal Albert Hall | Released: 6 December 2024; Label: BMG; Format: Digital download, streaming | — | — | — | — | 66 | — | — |

=== Compilation albums ===
List of albums, with selected chart positions
| Title | Album details | Peak chart positions | | | | | | | | Certifications |
| Title | Album details | UK | AUS | BEL | DEN | GER | NLD | NZ | SWI | Certifications |
|---|---|---|---|---|---|---|---|---|---|---|
| The Katie Melua Collection | Released: 13 October 2008; Label: Dramatico; Format: CD, digital download | 15 | 92 | 8 | 3 | 12 | 3 | 29 | 5 | BPI: Gold; BRMA: Gold; BVMI: Gold; IFPI DEN: Gold; IFPI SWI: Gold; NVPI: Gold |
| Ultimate Collection | Released: 5 October 2018; Label: BMG Rights Management; Format: CD, digital download, streaming | 22 | — | 181 | — | 29 | — | — | 37 | BPI: Silver |

=== Collaboration albums ===
| Title | EP details |
|---|---|
| Aerial Objects (with Simon Goff) | Released: 15 July 2022; Label: BMG; Format: CD, digital download, streaming |

== Extended plays ==
List of extended plays
| Title | EP details |
|---|---|
| iTunes Live: Berlin Festival | Released: 13 May 2008; Label: Dramatico; Format: Digital download |

== Singles ==
| Year | Single | Peak chart positions | | | | | | | | | | Certifications | Album |
| Year | Single | UK | IRL | NLD | GER | FRA | ITA | BEL | SWI | NOR | SWE | Certifications | Album |
|---|---|---|---|---|---|---|---|---|---|---|---|---|---|
| 2003 | "The Closest Thing to Crazy" | 10 | 8 | 41 | 49 | — | — | — | — | 15 | — | BPI: Silver | Call off the Search |
| 2004 | "Call off the Search" | 19 | 27 | — | — | — | — | — | — | — | — | | Call off the Search |
| 2004 | "Crawling up a Hill" | 46 | — | 88 | — | — | — | — | — | — | — | | Call off the Search |
| 2005 | "Nine Million Bicycles" | 5 | 11 | 2 | 31 | 56 | 17 | 4 | 43 | 10 | — | BPI: Silver | Piece by Piece |
| 2005 | "I Cried for You" / "Just Like Heaven" | 35 | 45 | 32 | — | — | — | 50 | — | — | — | | Piece by Piece |
| 2006 | "Spider's Web" | 52 | — | 50 | 67 | — | — | 66 | 54 | — | — | | Piece by Piece |
| 2006 | "It's Only Pain" | 41 | — | 39 | 80 | — | — | — | — | 15 | — | | Piece by Piece |
| 2006 | "Shy Boy" | — | — | 29 | — | — | — | — | — | — | — | | Piece by Piece |
| 2007 | "If You Were a Sailboat" | 23 | — | 10 | 62 | — | — | 13 | 12 | 5 | — | | Pictures |
| 2007 | "Mary Pickford (Used to Eat Roses)" | — | — | — | — | — | — | — | — | — | — | | Pictures |
| 2007 | "What a Wonderful World" (with Eva Cassidy) | 1 | — | — | — | — | — | 74 | — | — | 19 | | The Katie Melua Collection |
| 2008 | "If the Lights Go Out" | 96 | — | 58 | — | — | — | 46 | — | — | — | | Pictures |
| 2010 | "The Flood" | 35 | — | 79 | — | — | — | 7 | 19 | 20 | — | | The House |
| 2010 | "A Happy Place" | — | — | — | — | — | — | — | — | — | — | | The House |
| 2010 | "To Kill You with a Kiss"^{[A]} | — | — | — | — | — | — | — | — | — | — | | The House |
| 2011 | "Gold in them Hills" | — | — | — | — | — | — | — | — | — | — | | Secret Symphony |
| 2012 | "The Bit That I Don't Get" | — | — | — | — | — | — | — | — | — | — | | Secret Symphony |
| 2012 | "Better Than a Dream" | — | — | — | — | — | — | 73 | — | — | — | | Secret Symphony |
| 2012 | "Moonshine" | — | — | — | — | — | — | 94 | — | — | — | | Secret Symphony |
| 2012 | "The Walls of the World" | — | — | — | — | — | — | 128 | — | — | — | | Secret Symphony |
| 2012 | "Forgetting All My Troubles" | — | — | — | — | — | — | — | — | — | — | | Secret Symphony |
| 2013 | "I Will Be There" | 99 | — | — | — | 138 | — | 73 | — | — | — | | Ketevan |
| 2013 | "The Love I'm Frightened Of" | — | — | — | — | — | — | — | — | — | — | | Ketevan |
| 2015 | "Wonderful Life" | 73 | — | — | — | — | — | — | — | — | — | | Non-album single |
| 2017 | "Fields of Gold" | 29 | — | — | — | — | — | — | — | — | — | | In Winter (Special Edition) |
| 2020 | "A Love Like That" | — | — | — | — | — | — | — | — | — | — | | Album No. 8 |
| 2020 | "Airtime" | — | — | — | — | — | — | — | — | — | — | | Album No. 8 |
| 2020 | "Your Longing Is Gone" | — | — | — | — | — | — | — | — | — | — | | Album No. 8 |
| 2023 | "Golden Record" | — | — | — | — | — | — | — | — | — | — | | Love & Money |
| 2023 | "14 Windows" | ― | ― | ― | ― | — | — | — | — | — | — | | Love & Money |
"—" denotes single that did not chart or was not released in that territory.

Notes

- A The single "To Kill You with a Kiss" is called "I'd Love to Kill You" on the album The House (2010).

== Video albums ==
| Year | Title | Notes |
|---|---|---|
| 2006 | Katie Melua: On the Road Again | Live concert |
| 2007 | Katie Melua: Concert Under the Sea | Live concert |
| 2011 | Katie Melua: Katie Melua with the Stuttgart Philharmonic Orchestra | Live concert |

== Other appearances ==
| Year | Title | Notes |
|---|---|---|
| 2005 | "Fairytale of New York" (Live) | Performed with The Pogues. |
| 2005 | "Just Like Heaven" | Just Like Heaven: Music from the Motion Picture |
| 2006 | "When You Taught Me How To Dance" | Miss Potter: Music from the Motion Picture |
| 2007 | "Looking For Clues" | Nancy Drew: Music from the Motion Picture (also appears on the compilation album B-Sides: The Tracks That Got Away) |
| 2007 | "The Closest Thing to Crazy" (Spanish version) | a.k.a. "Esa Clase de Locura". Performed in Spanish. |
| 2007 | "Faraway Voice" (Spanish version) | a.k.a. "Otra vez tu". Performed in Spanish. |
| 2007 | "Don't Try This at Home" | Duet with Ali Campbell, on his album Running Free. |
| 2008 | "By the Light of the Magical Moon" | Free; available only from The Times Online. |
| 2018 | "Dreams on Fire (MTV Unplugged)" | Duet with Peter Maffay |
| 2018 | "Freiheit, die ich meine (MTV Unplugged)" | Peter Maffay with Katie Melua, Ilse DeLange, Jennifer Weist, Johannes Oerding, Philipp Poisel & Tony Carey |
| 2018 | "Ich wollte nie erwachsen sein (Nessajas Lied) (MTV Unplugged)" | Duet with Peter Maffay |
| 2023 | "End of Summer" | The Peasants: Music from the Motion Picture |
