= The Katie Melua Collection =

Compilation album by Katie Melua
- Released: October 27, 2008
- Genres: Pop; rock; vocal jazz
- Length: 61:46
- Label: Dramatico
- Producer: Mike Batt

Katie Melua chronology
| Pictures (2007) | The Katie Melua Collection (2008) | Live at the O² Arena (2009) |

The Katie Melua Collection is a compilation album by Georgian-born British singer and songwriter Katie Melua. The album is a two disc set with 17 songs, three previously unreleased, and a DVD that was filmed in Rotterdam, Netherlands.

The album includes the singles "When You Taught Me How to Dance" from the film Miss Potter, "What a Wonderful World" with a recording of Eva Cassidy, and three new songs: "Toy Collection" (written by Melua for the film Faintheart), "Two Bare Feet", and "Somewhere in the Same Hotel".

== Critical reception ==
Professional ratings
Review scores
| Source | Rating |
|---|---|
| AllMusic | 3.5/5 stars |
| laut.de | 3/5 stars |

BBC Music editor Elle J. Small concluded that The Katie Melua Collection, despite appearing somewhat premature as a greatest-hits release and offering limited incentive for dedicated fans, provides "an introduction to one of Britain’s key female solo artists," showcasing Melua's finest songs, "sumptuous, comforting" vocals, and storytelling talent. Mark Deming of AllMusic observed that the album compiles 14 of Melua's most popular songs, together with three new tracks, and presents a concise overview of the career that followed her discovery by producer Mike Batt and her emergence as one of Britain’s best-selling female artists through her jazz- and blues-influenced style. He rated The Katie Melua Collection three and a half out of five stars.

== Commercial performance ==
The Katie Melua Collection achieved moderate commercial success across Europe following its release in 2008. The compilation reached the top five in several countries, peaking at number three in both Denmark and the Netherlands, number four in Portugal, and number five in Switzerland. It also entered the top ten in Belgium's Wallonia region, where it reached number eight, and on Billboard's composite European Top 100 Albums chart, where it peaked at number seven. Elsewhere, the album attained top 20 positions in Germany (12), Norway (12), Belgium's Flanders region (13), and the United Kingdom (15). The compilation received multiple sales certifications across Europe, including gold certifications in Belgium, Denmark, Germany, Portugal, and the United Kingdom. In Switzerland, it was certified platinum, denoting shipments of 30,000 units.

== Track listing ==
=== Disc 1 ===
| No. | Title | Writer(s) | From Album | Length |
|---|---|---|---|---|
| 1. | "The Closest Thing to Crazy" | Mike Batt | Call Off the Search | 4:15 |
| 2. | "Nine Million Bicycles" | Batt | Piece by Piece | 3:17 |
| 3. | "What a Wonderful World" (duet with Eva Cassidy) | Bob Thiele; George David Weiss | Previously unreleased | 4:19 |
| 4. | "If You Were a Sailboat" | Batt | Pictures | 4:01 |
| 5. | "Piece by Piece" | Katie Melua | Piece by Piece | 3:24 |
| 6. | "Call Off the Search" | Batt | Call Off the Search | 3:25 |
| 7. | "On the Road Again" | Floyd Jones; Alan Wilson | Piece by Piece | 4:38 |
| 8. | "Mary Pickford" | Batt | Pictures | 3:13 |
| 9. | "Spider's Web" | Melua | Piece by Piece | 3:56 |
| 10. | "Thank You, Stars" | Batt | Piece by Piece | 3:40 |
| 11. | "I Cried for You" | Melua | Piece by Piece | 3:38 |
| 12. | "Crawling up a Hill" | John Mayall | Call Off the Search | 3:25 |
| 13. | "Tiger in the Night" | Batt | Call Off the Search | 3:08 |
| 14. | "When You Taught Me How to Dance" | Batt; Nigel Westlake; Richard Maltby Jr.; Melua | Miss Potter OST | 3:24 |
| 15. | "Two Bare Feet" | Batt; Melua | Previously unreleased | 3:00 |
| 16. | "Toy Collection" | Melua | Previously unreleased | 3:13 |
| 17. | "Somewhere in the Same Hotel" | Batt; Melua | Previously unreleased | 3:50 |

| No. | Title | Writer(s) | iTunes bonus track | Length |
|---|---|---|---|---|
| 18. | "Kozmic Blues" | Janis Joplin; Gabriel Mekler | Previously unreleased | 5:03 |

| No. | Title | Writer(s) | Tesco bonus track | Length |
|---|---|---|---|---|
| 18. | "How Sweet It Is to Be Loved by You" | Holland–Dozier–Holland | Previously unreleased | 4:23 |

| No. | Title | Writer(s) | The Times bonus track | Length |
|---|---|---|---|---|
| 18. | "By the Light of the Magical Moon" | Marc Bolan | Previously unreleased | 3:54 |

=== Disc 2 (A 90-minute DVD – The Arena Tour 2008, Live from Rotterdam) ===
1. "Piece By Piece
2. "I Do Believe In Love"
3. "My Aphrodisiac Is You"
4. "Crawling Up A Hill"
5. "Mary Pickford"
6. "Blues In the Night"
7. "If You Were a Sailboat"
8. "Ghost Town"
9. "Thank You, Stars
10. "Perfect Circle"
11. "What I Miss About You"
12. "Spider's Web"
13. "If The Lights Go Out"
14. "Scary Films"
15. "Spellbound"
16. "Mockingbird Song"
17. "The Closest Thing to Crazy"
18. "Nine Million Bicycles"
19. "On The Road Again"
20. "Kozmic Blues"
21. "I Cried For You"
22. Behind the Screens – a short film about the preparation and design of the tour production.

== Charts ==
=== Weekly charts ===
Weekly chart performance for The Katie Melua Collection
| Chart (2008) | Peak position |
|---|---|
| Australia Albums (ARIA) | 92 |
| Austrian Albums (Ö3 Austria) | 29 |
| Belgian Albums (Ultratop Flanders) | 13 |
| Belgian Albums (Ultratop Wallonia) | 8 |
| Danish Albums (Hitlisten) | 3 |
| Dutch Albums (Album Top 100) | 3 |
| European Top 100 Albums (Billboard) | 7 |
| Finnish Albums (Suomen virallinen lista) | 40 |
| German Albums (Offizielle Top 100) | 12 |
| Irish Albums (IRMA) | 17 |
| New Zealand Albums (RMNZ) | 27 |
| Norwegian Albums (VG-lista) | 12 |
| Polish Albums (ZPAV) | 34 |
| Portuguese Albums (AFP) | 4 |
| Swedish Albums (Sverigetopplistan) | 25 |
| Swiss Albums (Schweizer Hitparade) | 5 |
| UK Albums (Official Charts) | 15 |

=== Year-end charts ===
2008 year-end chart performance for The Katie Melua Collection
| Chart (2008) | Position |
|---|---|
| Belgian Albums (Ultratop Wallonia) | 100 |
| Swiss Albums (Schweizer Hitparade) | 53 |
| UK Albums (OCC) | 145 |

2009 year-end chart performance for The Katie Melua Collection
| Chart (2009) | Position |
|---|---|
| Danish Albums (Hitlisten) | 74 |
| Swiss Albums (Schweizer Hitparade) | 75 |

== Certifications ==
Certifications for The Katie Melua Collection
| Region | Certification | Certified units/sales |
|---|---|---|
| Belgium (BRMA) | Gold | 15,000^{*} |
| Denmark (IFPI Danmark) | Gold | 15,000^{^} |
| Germany (BVMI) | Gold | 100,000^{^} |
| Netherlands (NVPI) | Gold | 30,000^{^} |
| Portugal (AFP) | Gold | 10,000^{^} |
| Switzerland (IFPI Switzerland) | Platinum | 30,000^{^} |
| United Kingdom (BPI) | Gold | 100,000^{^} |
^{*} Sales figures based on certification alone.^{^} Shipments figures based on certification alone.
