= Live at the O² Arena =

Live album by Katie Melua
- Released: 18 May 2009
- Recorded: 8 November 2008
- Venue: The O2 Arena, London
- Genre: Blues, jazz, folk-pop
- Length: 89:37
- Label: Dramatico
- Producer: Mike Batt

Katie Melua chronology
| The Katie Melua Collection (2008) | Live at the O² Arena (2009) | The House (2010) |

Live at the O² Arena is a live album by Georgian-born British singer–songwriter Katie Melua. It was recorded on 8 November 2008 at the O2 Arena in London. The CD release of the album contains 19 tracks whereas the vinyl edition features a different track listing with three additional songs, namely "Thank You Stars", "Two Bare Feet" and "Spellbound". Those three tracks are also included in the digital download release of the album.

== Track listing ==
=== CD and digital download ===
1. "Piece by Piece" (Katie Melua) – 3:19
2. "Lilac Wine" (James Shelton) – 4:08
3. "Kviteli Potlebi (Yellow Leaves)" (Giya Kancheli, Gruzinski) – 2:54
4. "My Aphrodisiac Is You" (Mike Batt) – 4:20
5. "Crawling up a Hill" (Mayall) – 3:25
6. "Mary Pickford (Used to Eat Roses)" (Batt) – 3:15
7. "Blues in the Night" (Harold Arlen, Johnny Mercer) – 4:20
8. "If You Were a Sailboat" (Batt) – 3:57
9. "Ghost Town" (Melua, Batt) – 3:41
10. "Perfect Circle" (Melua, Molly McQueen) – 7:12
11. "Spider's Web" (Melua) – 3:58
12. "Toy Collection" (Melua) – 3:15
13. "Scary Films" (Batt) – 4:08
14. "Mockingbird Song" (Batt) – 4:16
15. "The Closest Thing to Crazy" (Batt) – 4:16
16. "Nine Million Bicycles" (Batt) – 3:35
17. "On the Road Again" (Floyd Jones, Alan Wilson) – 4:56
18. "Kozmic Blues" (Janis Joplin, Gabriel Mekler) – 5:19
19. "I Cried for You" (Melua) – 3:31

Digital download bonus tracks

20. "Thank You Stars" (Batt) – 3:49
21. "Two Bare Feet" (Melua, Batt) – 3:25
22. "Spellbound" (Melua) – 4:29

=== Vinyl LP ===
Side A (21:22 min.)

1. "Piece by Piece" (Melua) – 3:19
2. "Lilac Wine" (Shelton) – 4:07
3. "Kviteli Potlebi (Yellow Leaves)" (Kancheli, Gruzinski) – 2:54
4. "My Aphrodisiac Is You" (Batt) – 4:20
5. "Crawling up a Hill" (Mayall) – 3:25
6. "Mary Pickford (Used to Eat Roses)" (Batt) – 3:14

Side B (22:57 min.)

1. "Blues in the Night" (Arlen, Mercer) – 4:20
2. "If You Were a Sailboat" (Batt) – 3:57
3. "Ghost Town" (Melua, Batt) – 3:41
4. "Thank You Stars" (Batt) – 3:49
5. "Perfect Circle" (Melua, McQueen) – 7:12

Side C (23:38 min.)

1. "Two Bare Feet" (Melua, Batt) – 3:25
2. "Spider's Web" (Melua) – 3:58
3. "Toy Collection" (Melua) – 3:15
4. "Scary Films" (Batt) – 4:08
5. "Spellbound" (Melua) – 4:29
6. "Mockingbird Song" (Batt) – 4:15

Side D (21:40 min.)

1. "The Closest Thing to Crazy" (Batt) – 4:16
2. "Nine Million Bicycles" (Batt) – 3:35
3. "On the Road Again" (Jones, Wilson) – 4:56
4. "Kozmic Blues" (Joplin, Mekler) – 5:19
5. "I Cried for You" (Melua) – 3:31

=== Variants ===
In Portugal the album was released with a bonus CD of material originally recorded for Rádio Comercial, February 21, 2009, and entitled "Concerto mais pequeno do mundo" ("The smallest gig in the world"):

1. "If You Were a Sailboat"
2. "Crawling up a Hill"
3. "Nine Million Bicycles"
4. "Dirty Dice"
5. "Lilac Wine"

== Charts ==
Weekly chart performance for Live at the O² Arena
| Chart (2009) | Peak position |
|---|---|
| Belgian Albums (Ultratop Flanders) | 60 |
| Belgian Albums (Ultratop Wallonia) | 36 |
| Danish Albums (Hitlisten) | 35 |
| Dutch Albums (Album Top 100) | 52 |
| French Albums (SNEP) | 52 |
| German Albums (Offizielle Top 100) | 43 |
| Swiss Albums (Schweizer Hitparade) | 14 |
| UK Physical Albums (OCC) | 97 |
