= Andrea McEwan =

Actress and musical artist

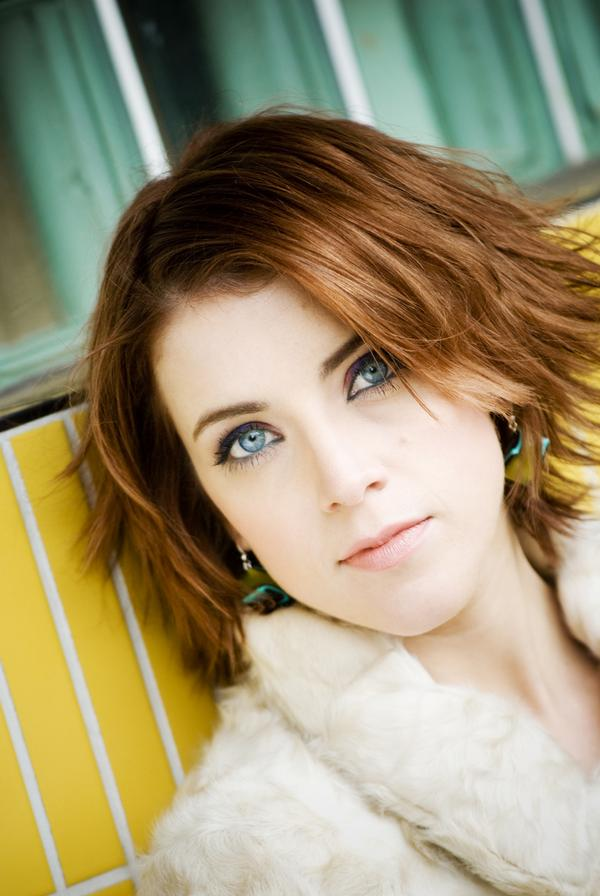

Background information
- Born: October 9, 1978 (age 47); Melbourne, Australia
- Genres: Jazz, folk-pop
- Occupations: Actress, singer, songwriter, musician
- Instruments: Guitar, vocals
- Years active: 1989–present
- Label: Dramatico

Andrea McEwan (born 9 October 1978) is an Australian actress, singer, musician and songwriter.

== Career ==
After attending MacRobertson Girls' High School in Melbourne, McEwan started acting, appearing in several television series including Ocean Girl and Funky Squad. In 1991 she was nominated for a Gladys Moncrieff Award for Outstanding New Talent by the Music Theatre Guild of Victoria after her performance in Annie. She has also appeared several times in the soap opera Neighbours. Her first role as Sonia came in 1989, then in 1991 she played Sarah Livingston, followed by Nicole Cahill in 1995. She played Penny Watts in 2002.

In 2000, McEwan studied at National Institute of Dramatic Art. She moved to the United Kingdom in the 2000s and in 2005 she appeared in Coronation Street where she played Lisa Ditchfield.

After moving to the UK, McEwan started singing and song writing professionally and in 2006 was signed to Mike Batt's Dramatico record label. In 2007, she collaborated with Katie Melua, writing lyrics for "What I Miss About You" and Dirty Dice which appeared on Melua's third album, Pictures.

McEwan toured the UK in late 2008 supporting Katie Melua. In 2008 she released a three track E.P., Candle in a Chatroom featuring the songs "Candle in a Chatroom", "Black Socks in the Wash" and "Fast Train". She released the second single ("Alibi") at the beginning of April.

Her debut album Rental Property released at end of May 2009 by Dramatico Entertainment Ltd.

== Filmography ==
Andrea McEwan film and television credits
Year	Title	Role	Notes	Ref.
1989–2002	Neighbours	Sonia / Sara Livingston / Nicole Cahill / Penny Watts	34 episodes	
1994	Ocean Girl	Lee	13 episodes	
1994, 2002	Blue Heelers	Joanne Foster / Erin Williams	2 episodes	
1995	Funky Squad	Unknown	1 episode	
2001	All Saints	Jaqui Henderson	1 episode	
2001	BeastMaster	Pola	Episode: "Destiny" (S3.E8)	
2001, 2002	McLeod's Daughters	Kimmy	2 episodes	
2003	CrashBurn	Lucinda	2 episodes	
2004	The Secret Life of Us	Melissa	1 episode	
2005	Coronation Street	Lisa Ditchfield	3 episodes	
