= I Will Be There =

I Will Be There may refer to:

- I Will Be There (album), a 2003 album by Kyla, or its title track
- I Will Be There (EP), a 1985 EP by Gogmagog
- "I Will Be There" (Dan Seals song)
- "I Will Be There" (Van Morrison song)
- "I Will Be There", a song by Art of Dying (band) from Art of Dying
- "I Will Be There", a song by Britney Spears from ...Baby One More Time
- "I Will Be There", a song by Glass Tiger from The Thin Red Line
- "I Will Be There", a song by Katie Melua from Ketevan
- "I Will Be There", a song by Odessa from the soundtrack of the 2014 teen romantic drama film If I Stay

== See also ==
- I'll Be There (disambiguation)
