= I'll Be There =

I'll Be There may refer to:

== Music ==
=== Songs ===
- "I'll Be There" (Arashi song), 2017
- "I'll Be There" (Bobby Darin song), 1960, notably covered by Gerry and the Pacemakers (1965) and Elvis Presley (1970)
- "I'll Be There" (Bright song), 2008
- "I'll Be There" (Chic song), 2015
- "I'll Be There" (Emma Bunton song), 2003
- "I'll Be There" (The Escape Club song), 1991
- "I'll Be There" (Jackson 5 song), 1970, notably covered as a duet by Mariah Carey and Trey Lorenz (1992)
- "I'll Be There" (Jess Glynne song), 2018
- "I'll Be There" (Jin song), 2024
- "I'll Be There" (Tiffany Evans song), 2010
- "I'll Be There (If You Ever Want Me)", by Ray Price, 1954
- "I'll Be There", by Alisa Xayalith, 2022
- "I'll Be There", by Bon Iver from Sable, Fable, 2025
- "I'll Be There", by Boyfriend, 2011
- "I'll Be There", by Boyzone from Said and Done, 1995
- "I'll Be There", by Damita Jo DeBlanc, 1961
- "I'll Be There", by Eternal from Always & Forever, 1993
- "I'll Be There", by Hardline from Double Eclipse, 1992
- "I'll Be There", by Hollywood Undead from Day of the Dead, 2015
- "I'll Be There", by Kara from The First Bloooooming, 2007
- "I'll Be There", by Kumi Koda, a B-side from "4 Hot Wave", 2006
- "I'll Be There", by Loona from HyunJin, 2016
- "I'll Be There", by Mac Miller from Best Day Ever, 2011
- "I'll Be There", by Megadeth from Risk, 1999
- "I'll Be There", by the Neales, 2016
- "I'll Be There", by Phil Ochs from A Toast to Those Who Are Gone, 1986
- "I'll Be There", by Pretty Maids from Stripped, 1993
- "I'll Be There", by Robin Schulz, Rita Ora and Tiago PZK, 2023
- "I'll Be There", by S Club 7, a B-side of the 2000 single "Reach"
- "I'll Be There", by Sarah Geronimo, 2008
- "I'll Be There", by STAYC, 2021
- "I'll Be There", by Stunt, 2009
- "I'll Be There", by Sweetbox from Greatest Hits, 2007
- "I'll Be There", by Taeyang from Solar, 2010
- "I'll Be There", by Walk off the Earth, 2019
- "I'll Be There", the theme to The Election, performed by Eva Chan, 2014
- "I'll Be There (When You Get Lonely)", by Ray Price, 1957
- "Truly Julie's Blues (I'll Be There)", by Bob Lind, 1966

=== Albums ===
- I'll Be There (Ki-Yo album), 2001
- I'll Be There, by Gloria Gaynor, 1994
- I'll Be There, by Si Kahn, 1989

== Other media ==
- I'll Be There (2003 film), a film starring Charlotte Church and Craig Ferguson
- I'll Be There (2010 film), a Filipino film starring Gabby Concepcion and KC Concepcion
- I'll Be There (novel), a novel by Iris Rainer Dart

== See also ==
- I Will Be There (disambiguation)
- "I'll Be Around" (The Spinners song)
- I'll Be There for You (disambiguation)
- "Reach Out I'll Be There", a 1966 song by the Four Tops
