= In Winter =

Studio album by Katie Melua
- Released: 14 October 2016
- Recorded: Gori, Georgia (2016)
- Length: 35:22
- Label: BMG Rights Management
- Producer: Katie Melua; Adam "Cecil" Bartlett

Katie Melua chronology
Ketevan (2013)	In Winter (2016)	Ultimate Collection (2018)

In Winter is the seventh studio album by British singer-songwriter Katie Melua. It was released through BMG Rights Management on 14 October 2016. The album comprises a collection of seasonal covers from various cultures, and some original works reflecting on Melua's upbringing during Georgia's Soviet era and the difficult times of its subsequent civil war.

== Background ==
For this record, Melua went back to her native Georgia to record an album with the Gori Women's Choir, a native Georgian all-woman singing troupe. She teamed up with co-producer Adam 'Cecil' Bartlett, and travelled to the town of Gori, where they set up a recording studio in the local community arts centre. For the special choral arrangements, she brought in composer Bob Chilcott. This was Melua's first album since the end of her six album partnership deal with Mike Batt on his Dramatico Record label.

== Critical reception ==
Professional ratings
Review scores
Source	Rating
AllMusic	4.5/5 stars
The Arts Desk	4/5 stars
Evening Standard	4/5 stars
The Independent	3/5 stars

Andy Gill from The Independent described In Winter a "cocoa-warm and comforting" seasonal set that avoids standard carols in favour of reinterpretations like "River" and "The Little Swallow." He highlighted its quieter originals. Writing for The Evening Standard, John Aizlewood called it a return to form after earlier "missteps," describing her performance as "endearingly brittle" and ultimately "she's bewitching," with the Gori Women's Choir adding layered warmth to its seasonal concept. Matt Collar of AllMusic likewise described it as a "gorgeously rendered holiday-themed effort," recorded in Georgia and blending "haunting classical harmonies" with reflective originals and carefully selected covers including "River" and "O Holy Night." Joanna O'Donnell, writing for The Dorset Echo, characterised the album as a stripped-back seasonal concept made in a DIY studio with the choir, noting its wintry, fireside atmosphere, and highlighting "Dreams on Fire" for its lingering philosophical line, "if all your dreams were on fire, which one would you save?"

== Track listing ==
In Winter track listing
No.	Title	Writer(s)	Length
1.	"The Little Swallow"	Traditional	1:46
2.	"River"	Joni Mitchell	3:25
3.	"Perfect World"	Katie Melua; Joel Harries	4:24
4.	"Cradle Song"	Traditional	1:43
5.	"A Time to Buy"	Melua	3:31
6.	"Plane Song"	Melua	4:07
7.	"If You Are So Beautiful"	Anzor Erkomaishvili; Natela Onashvili	3:43
8.	"Dreams on Fire"	Melua; Don Black	4:05
9.	"All Night Vigil – Nunc Dimittis"	Sergei Rachmaninoff	4:15
10.	"O Holy Night"	Adolphe Adam	4:23
Total length:			35:22

== Charts ==
=== Weekly charts ===
Weekly chart performance for In Winter
Chart (2016)	Peak position
Austrian Albums (Ö3 Austria)	11
Belgian Albums (Ultratop Flanders)	25
Belgian Albums (Ultratop Wallonia)	21
Dutch Albums (Album Top 100)	17
French Albums (SNEP)	29
German Albums (Offizielle Top 100)	10
New Zealand Heatseekers Albums (RMNZ)	2
Norwegian Albums (VG-lista)	7
Polish Albums (ZPAV)	13
Swiss Albums (Schweizer Hitparade)	4
UK Albums (OCC)	9

=== Year-end charts ===
Year-end chart performance for In Winter
Chart (2016)	Position
Belgian Albums (Ultratop Wallonia)	169

== Certifications ==
Certifications for In Winter
Region	Certification	Certified units/sales
United Kingdom (BPI)	Silver	60,000^{‡}
^{‡} Sales+streaming figures based on certification alone.
