= What a Wonderful World =

1967 single by Louis Armstrong

- Scandinavian release cover

Single by Louis Armstrong

from the album What a Wonderful World
- B-side: "Cabaret"
- Released: September 1967
- Recorded: August 16, 1967
- Studio: United, Las Vegas, US
- Genre: Traditional pop; R&B
- Length: 2:21
- Label: ABC
- Songwriters: Bob Thiele (as George Douglas); George David Weiss
- Producer: Bob Thiele

Louis Armstrong singles chronology
"Mi va de cantare" (1967)	"What a Wonderful World" (1967)	"Hello Brother" (1968)

Music video
- "What a Wonderful World" on YouTube

"What a Wonderful World" is a song written by Bob Thiele (as "George Douglas") and George David Weiss. It was first recorded by Louis Armstrong on August 16, 1967. In April 1968, it topped the pop chart in the United Kingdom, but performed poorly in the United States because Larry Newton, the president of ABC Records, disliked the song and refused to promote it.

After it was heard in the film Good Morning, Vietnam, it was reissued as a single in 1988, and rose to number 32 on the Billboard Hot 100. Armstrong's recording was inducted to the Grammy Hall of Fame in 1999.

== Composition and production ==
Thiele, using the pseudonym George Douglas, co-wrote the song with George Weiss. Thiele's real name has been used for the composer credits from 1988 onward. Thiele said the following regarding his inspiration for the song: "[I]n the mid-1960s during the deepening national traumas of the Kennedy assassination, Vietnam, racial strife, and turmoil everywhere, my co-writer George David Weiss and I had an idea to write a 'different' song specifically for Louis Armstrong that would be called 'What a Wonderful World.'" Thiele also produced the original recording of the song, using his real name for the production credit. In Graham Nash's book Off the Record: Songwriters on Songwriting, George Weiss says he wrote the song specifically for Louis Armstrong, as he was inspired by Armstrong's ability to bring together people of different races.

One source claims the song was first offered to Tony Bennett, who turned it down, although Louis Armstrong biographer Ricky Riccardi disputes this.

Armstrong was gigging at the Tropicana Hotel in Las Vegas, so he chose to record the song nearby at Bill Porter's United Recording studio. The session was scheduled to follow Armstrong's midnight show, and by 2 a.m. the musicians were settled and tape was rolling. Arranger Artie Butler was there with songwriters Weiss and Thiele, and Armstrong was in the studio singing with the orchestra. Armstrong had recently signed to ABC Records, and ABC president Larry Newton showed up to photograph Armstrong. Newton wanted a swingy pop song like "Hello, Dolly!", a big hit for Armstrong when he was with Kapp Records, so when Newton heard the slow pace of "What a Wonderful World", he tried to stop the session. Newton was physically removed and locked out of the studio for his disruption, which resulted in Newton later refusing to promote the song.

A second problem arose with the taping session when nearby freight train horns interrupted the music twice, forcing the orchestra to start over. Armstrong shook his head and laughed off the distractions, keeping his composure. The session ended around 6 a.m., going longer than expected. To be sure the orchestra members were paid extra for their overtime, Armstrong accepted only $250 musicians' union scale for his work.

== Release and reception ==
Because Newton refused to promote the song, it initially sold fewer than 1,000 copies in the US. It was a major success in the United Kingdom, reaching number 1 on the UK Singles Chart. In the US, it eventually reached number 116 on the Billboard Bubbling Under Chart. It was also the biggest-selling single of 1968 in the UK, where it was among the last pop singles issued by His Master's Voice before it became an exclusively classical music label. The song made Armstrong the oldest male to top the UK Singles Chart. (His record was broken in 2009 when a remake of "Islands in the Stream" recorded for Comic Relief—which included the 68-year-old Tom Jones—reached number 1.)

ABC Records' European distributor EMI forced ABC to issue a What a Wonderful World album in 1968 (catalogue number ABCS-650). It did not chart in the United States, due to ABC not promoting it, but charted in the UK where it was issued by Stateside Records with catalogue number SSL 10247 and peaked on the British chart at number 37.

== Enduring success ==
The song gradually became something of a pop standard. An episode of The Muppet Show produced in 1977 and broadcast early in 1978 featured Rowlf the Dog singing the song to a puppy. In 1978, it was featured in the closing scenes of BBC radio's The Hitchhiker's Guide to the Galaxy, and was repeated for BBC's 1981 TV adaptation of the series. In 1987, Armstrong's recording was used in the film Good Morning, Vietnam (despite its setting in 1965, two years before the song was recorded) and was re-released as a single, reaching number 32 on the Billboard Hot 100 chart in February 1988. It charted at number 1 for the fortnight ending June 27, 1988, on the Australian chart.

When the ABC television sitcom Family Matters premiered in 1989, Armstrong's version of "What a Wonderful World" was used as the show's theme song. After the fifth episode, it was replaced by the original song "As Days Go By".

In 2001, rappers Ghostface Killah, Raekwon, and the Alchemist released "The Forest," a song that begins with three lines of lyric adapted from "What a Wonderful World", altered to become "an invitation to get high" on marijuana. The rappers and their record company, Sony Music Entertainment, were sued by Abilene Music, the owners of "What a Wonderful World". The suit was thrown out after Judge Gerard E. Lynch determined that the altered lyric was a parody, transforming the uplifting original message to a new one with a darker nature.

After it was released digitally, Armstrong's 1967 recording had sold over 2,173,000 downloads in the United States as of April 2014.

In 2021, it was ranked at No. 171 on Rolling Stone's "Top 500 Best Songs of All Time".

In June 2026, CBS News included the song in its list of the 250 essential American songs of the past 250 years.

== Charts and certifications ==
=== Weekly charts ===
Chart (1967–1968)	Peak position
Austria (Ö3 Austria Top 40)	1
Belgium (Ultratop 50 Flanders)	6
Denmark	2
Ireland (IRMA)	2
New Zealand (Listener)	15
Norway (VG-lista)	6
Switzerland (Schweizer Hitparade)	7
UK Singles (Official Charts)	1
West Germany (GfK)	6

Chart (1988)	Peak position
Australia (ARIA)	1
Belgium (VRT Top 30 Flanders)	1
Canada Adult Contemporary (RPM)	6
Canada Top Singles (RPM)	10
Netherlands (Dutch Top 40)	2
Netherlands (Single Top 100)	5
New Zealand (Recorded Music NZ)	8
Poland	22
US Billboard Hot 100	32
US Adult Contemporary (Billboard)	7

=== Year-end charts ===
Chart (1988)	Rank
Australia	8
Canada Top Singles (RPM)	82
US (Joel Whitburn's Pop Annual)	194

=== Certifications ===
Region	Certification	Certified units/sales
Canada (Music Canada)	5× Platinum	400,000^{‡}
Denmark (IFPI Danmark)	Platinum	90,000^{‡}
Germany (BVMI)	3× Gold	900,000^{‡}
Italy (FIMI)	Platinum	70,000^{‡}
New Zealand (RMNZ)	2× Platinum	60,000^{‡}
Spain (Promusicae)	Platinum	60,000^{‡}
United Kingdom (BPI)	Platinum	600,000^{‡}
United States (RIAA)	5× Platinum	5,000,000^{‡}
^{‡} Sales+streaming figures based on certification alone.

== Eva Cassidy and Katie Melua version ==
"What a Wonderful World"

Single by Eva Cassidy and Katie Melua
- B-side: "Have Yourself a Merry Little Christmas" (by Katie Melua)
- Released: December 3, 2007
- Length: 4:19
- Label: Tesco
- Producer: Mike Batt

Eva Cassidy singles chronology
"Fields of Gold" (2007)	"What a Wonderful World" (2007)	"Songbird" (2007)

Katie Melua singles chronology
"Mary Pickford" (2007)	"What a Wonderful World" (2007)	"If the Lights Go Out" (2008)

Music video
- "What a Wonderful World" on YouTube

In 2007, Georgian-British singer-songwriter Katie Melua recorded a version of "What a Wonderful World" with American singer and guitarist Eva Cassidy, who had died in 1996. Recorded by Melua singing over the original Cassidy track, the duet was released in late 2007 as a charity single for the British Red Cross. Melua, who considers Cassidy one of her musical idols, had previously sung with Cassidy in this manner on Christmas Eve 2006, when she performed "Over the Rainbow" on the BBC One television program Duets Impossible with a videotape of Cassidy singing the song. This version of "What a Wonderful World" was available for purchase only at Tesco stores and on the Tesco Direct website.

Upon its release, the single debuted at number 45 on the Scottish Singles Chart on the week of December 9, 2007. The next week, the song rose 44 positions to number one while also debuting at number one on the UK Singles Chart, giving both Cassidy and Melua their first number-one single in the United Kingdom. It became the first UK number-one single to be available through only one retailer, with 97 percent of its weekly 56,114 sales coming from the physical CD format sold at Tesco. The song quickly descended the UK chart after peaking, spending five weeks in the UK top 100. The cover was also successful in Sweden, reaching number 19 in November 2008, and became a minor hit in the Wallonia region of Belgium.

When the song reached number one in the UK, Melua thanked everyone who bought the single, saying, "Thank you to everyone who has shown such festive goodwill." The duet was later included on her 2008 compilation album The Katie Melua Collection.

=== Charts ===
==== Weekly charts ====
Chart (2007–2008)	Peak position
Belgium (Ultratip Bubbling Under Wallonia)	24
Europe (Eurochart Hot 100)	6
Sweden (Sverigetopplistan)	19
Scottish Singles Sales (Official Charts)	1
UK Singles (Official Charts)	1

==== Year-end charts ====
Chart (2007)	Position
UK Singles (OCC)	58

== Other notable versions ==
- 1988: Willie Nelson, on his album What a Wonderful World (reached number 6 on the Billboard Top Country Albums)
- 1989: Roy Clark, on his album What a Wonderful World (peaked at No. 73 on the Billboard Hot Country Singles chart)
- 1992: Nick Cave and Shane MacGowan, a collaboration on their split single What a Wonderful World (reached number 72 on the UK charts)
- 1993: Israel Kamakawiwo'ole, Hawaiian ukulele version (medley with "Somewhere Over the Rainbow") on the album Facing Future (sold over 2.5 million copies in the U.S. and Canada alone)
- 1999: Kenny G, on his Classics in the Key of G album, combined his own saxophone playing with Armstrong's vocals and other elements of the original recording. Music critics were scathing, and jazz guitarist Pat Metheny was appalled, writing on his website that the combination was "musical necrophilia". The song reached number 22 on the US Adult Contemporary chart in September 1999.
- 1999: Anne Murray, on What a Wonderful World which also spawned a book and video (the album reached No. 1 on the US CCM chart, No. 4 on the US Country chart, No. 38 on the top 200, and No. 15 on the Canadian Country charts)
- 2001: Joey Ramone recorded a version for his first solo album Don't Worry About Me, which was released posthumously in 2002. This cover was also featured on the 2003 Freaky Friday soundtrack.
- 2003: Sarah Brightman recorded a version of the song for her eighth studio album, Harem. The recording received generally favorable reviews, with praise for Brightman's vocal performance and reinterpretation of the Louis Armstrong classic. One reviewer called it "probably the best cover she has ever done", while another described it as "a wonderful cover of the classic". Billboard considered Brightman "at her best" on the song. Some critics were less receptive to the arrangement, criticizing its electronic elements and sentimental approach. Brightman also performed the song during the Harem World Tour, where its theatrical presentation received a positive response.
- 2004: Rod Stewart recorded a version of the song with Stevie Wonder for Stewart's album Stardust: The Great American Songbook, Volume III (released in the United States as the lead single from the album and by early 2005 reached No. 13 on the Billboard Adult Contemporary chart).
- 2010: Robert Wyatt, with Ros Stephen and Gilad Atzmon, recorded a version for the album For The Ghosts Within. The song was also released as a single.
- 2011: Bob Thiele Jr. did a cover of the song which was performed by Alison Mosshart and the Forest Rangers for the FX series Sons of Anarchy (SE4E1 Out) and was included in Songs of Anarchy: Music from Sons of Anarchy Seasons 1–4 album.
- 2012: Pat Byrne's version reached No. 3 in the Irish Singles Chart after appearing on The Voice of Ireland.
- 2018: Barbra Streisand blended the song with John Lennon's "Imagine" for her album Walls.
- 2019: Reuben and the Dark contributed a cover of the song for the soundtrack of the 2020 film Dolittle.
