= If the Lights Go Out =

Single by Katie Melua

from the album Pictures
- B-side: "Looking for Clues"
- Released: 25 February 2008
- Genre: Art rock
- Length: 3:14
- Label: Dramatico
- Songwriter(s): Mike Batt
- Producer(s): Mike Batt

Katie Melua singles chronology
"Mary Pickford" (2007)	"If the Lights Go Out" (2008)	"The Flood" (2010)

"If the Lights Go Out" is a song written by Mike Batt for The Hollies, and first released by them in the July 1983 on the album What Goes Around.

Cash Box said that "a love-will-prevail-even-if-doomsday-comes message is affirmed by the group’s classic harmonies and guitar tones."

The cover version by Georgian-born, British singer Katie Melua, was released on 25 February 2008. It is Melua's eleventh single (not counting her number one duet of "What a Wonderful World" with Eva Cassidy) and the third from her third album, Pictures.

== Track listings ==
1. "If The Lights Go Out" (Radio Mix)
2. "Looking For Clues"

=== Weekly charts ===
Chart (2008)	Peak position
UK Singles (OCC)	96
UK Indie (OCC)	5
