= I'll Be There for You =

I'll Be There for You may refer to:

- I'll Be There for You (album), a 2001 album by KC and the Sunshine Band
- "I'll Be There for You" (Bon Jovi song), 1989
- "I'll Be There for You" (The Moffatts song), 1998
- "I'll Be There for You" (The Rembrandts song), 1995, the theme song to the television sitcom Friends
- "I'll Be There for You" (Solid HarmoniE song), 1997
- "I'll Be There for You"/"You're All I Need to Get By", a 1995 single by Method Man and Mary J. Blige
- "I'll Be There for You", a song by Backstreet Boys from the 1999 album Millennium
- "I'll Be There for You", a song by Black 'n Blue from the 1986 album Nasty Nasty
- "I'll Be There for You", a song by Primal Scream from the 1994 album Give Out But Don't Give Up
- "I'll Be There for You", a song by Caiphus Semenya from the 1978 album Herb Alpert / Hugh Masekela
- "I'll Be There for You", a song by Donna De Lory from Songs 95

== See also ==
- "I Will Be There for You", a 1999 song by Jessica Andrews
- I'll Be There (disambiguation)
- There for You (disambiguation)
