= Pictures (Katie Melua album) =

Studio album by Katie Melua
- Released: 1 October 2007
- Genres: Easy listening; blues; jazz; reggae
- Length: 44:44
- Label: Dramatico
- Producer: Mike Batt

Katie Melua chronology
Piece by Piece (2005)	Pictures (2007)	The Katie Melua Collection (2008)

Singles from Pictures
- 1. "If You Were A Sailboat" Released: 24 September 2007; 2. "Mary Pickford" Released: 26 November 2007; 3. "If the Lights Go Out" Released: 25 February 2008

Pictures is the third studio album by British singer Katie Melua. It was released by Dramatico on 1 October 2007 in the United Kingdom and subsequently issued in international markets, including the United States on 5 May 2009, where it was released with an alternate cover design. Initially announced as, at least temporarily, the final album in her collaboration with lead writer and producer Mike Batt, it features songwriting contributions from Molly McQueen and Andrea McEwan, as well as a cover of Leonard Cohen and Sharon Robinson's "In My Secret Life" and Prince's "Under the Cherry Moon."

The album received generally positive reviews from music critics, who praised Melua's songwriting and vocal performances, while some criticized Mike Batt's lyrical contributions. Pictures was a major commercial success, reaching number one in the Netherlands and Switzerland and peaking within the top ten in numerous European countries, including the United Kingdom, Germany, and France. It earned multiple platinum certifications across Europe and was certified Platinum by the International Federation of the Phonographic Industry (IFPI) for shipments of over one million copies across the continent.

== Background ==
Pictures, Melua's third album, was initially announced to be, at least temporarily, the last of her albums in collaboration with Mike Batt as lead writer and producer. The album features contributions from several songwriters, including Melua's friend Molly McQueen, the former frontwoman of The Faders, who co-wrote "Perfect Circle". Melua also collaborated with Andrea McEwan, who wrote the lyrics for "What I Miss About You" and "Dirty Dice". The album includes a cover version of "In My Secret Life", originally written by Leonard Cohen and Sharon Robinson. Discussing the song, Melua stated that it resonated with her because it explores the contrast between people's ideals and the realities of everyday life, noting that "we all have great ideals but in reality we end up conforming, following everyone else."

== Critical reception ==
Professional ratings
Review scores
Source	Rating
AllMusic	3/5 stars
Digital Spy	3/5 stars
The Guardian	2/5 stars
laut.de	3/5 stars
Q	3/5 stars
Virgin Media	1.5/5 stars

Pictures received generally positive reviews from critics. In a positive review for BBC Music, Lizzie Ennever praised Melua's voice, subtle songwriting, and varied musical influences. Although she found some songs "bland and forgettable" and considered lead single "If You Were a Sailboat" a safe choice, Ennever concluded that she was "erring on the side of good" rather than "undecided" regarding the album. Nick Levine of Digital Spy was similarly positive, arguing that Melua's self-written songs were "more vital, more interesting and more affecting" than those written by Mike Batt, and citing "Perfect Circle", "Spellbound", and "What I Miss About You" as highlights. While he criticized several of Batt's contributions as overly whimsical and described "Ghost Town" as the album's "only real stinker", Levine felt that Pictures benefited from Melua's growing artistic independence.

Other reviews were more mixed. Writing for The Guardian, Betty Clarke praised Melua's gentle, blues-influenced vocals and suggested that self-written tracks such as "Spellbound" demonstrated artistic growth, but criticized Batt's lyrics as "shocking" and often detrimental to the songs. She concluded that Melua was beginning to "rescu[e] her career" by emerging from Batt's creative influence. In a largely negative review for Virgin Media, Tony Bartholomew criticized Batt's songwriting as "twee and inoffensive" and his lyrics as "truly dreadful". Nevertheless, he praised Melua's own compositions, including "What I Miss About You", "Dirty Dice", and "Perfect Circle", as evidence that she had "outgrown her mentor", despite awarding the album just one star out of five.

== Commercial performance ==
Pictures achieved significant commercial success across Europe following its release. The album reached number one in both the Netherlands and Switzerland, while also peaking at number two in Austria, Belgium's Wallonian region, Denmark, Germany, Norway, and the United Kingdom, where it opened with 53,878 copies sold in its first week. In Belgium's Flemish region, the album reached number ten, and it also attained top-five positions in France, Poland, Portugal, Scotland, and on the UK Independent Albums Chart, where it topped the chart. Outside Europe, Pictures reached number 63 on the Australian Albums Chart, number 27 in New Zealand, and number 11 on the US Heatseekers charts. Additional top-twenty placements were recorded in Finland, Italy, and Sweden.

The album's strongest market was the Netherlands, where it became the best-performing album of 2007 on the Dutch Albums Chart. It also appeared on several year-end charts across Europe, including number 9 in Switzerland, and number 49 on the UK Albums year-end chart in 2007. The album continued to perform strongly into 2008, appearing on year-end charts in Belgium, Germany, the Netherlands, Switzerland, and the United Kingdom. Pictures also received numerous sales certifications across Europe and beyond. It was certified Gold in Austria, Belgium, Portugal, and Sweden; Platinum in Denmark, France, Germany, the Netherlands, New Zealand, and the United Kingdom; and double Platinum in Switzerland. Collectively, these certifications reflected strong sales throughout its international markets. In recognition of its continental success, Pictures was awarded Platinum certification by the International Federation of the Phonographic Industry (IFPI) for shipments exceeding one million units across Europe.

== Track listing ==
Pictures track listing
No.	Title	Writer(s)	Length
1.	"Mary Pickford"	Mike Batt	3:12
2.	"It's All in My Head"	Batt; Katie Melua	4:03
3.	"If the Lights Go Out"	Batt	3:14
4.	"What I Miss About You"	Andrea McEwan; Melua	3:48
5.	"Spellbound"	Melua	3:00
6.	"What It Says on the Tin"	Batt	3:44
7.	"Scary Films"	Batt	4:02
8.	"Perfect Circle"	Molly McQueen; Melua	4:01
9.	"Ghost Town"	Batt; Melua	3:31
10.	"If You Were a Sailboat"	Batt	4:02
11.	"Dirty Dice"	McEwan; Melua	3:39
12.	"In My Secret Life"	Leonard Cohen; Sharon Robinson	4:23
Total length:			44:44

iTunes bonus track
No.	Title	Writer(s)	Length
13.	"Under the Cherry Moon"	Prince; John L. Nelson	3:50

Japanese bonus tracks
No.	Title	Writer(s)	Length
13.	"When You Taught Me How to Dance"	Batt; Nigel Westlake; Richard Maltby Jr.	3:24
14.	"The Closest Thing to Crazy" (acoustic version)	Batt	3:11

Target bonus tracks
No.	Title	Writer(s)	Length
13.	"The Closest Thing to Crazy" (live version)	Batt	3:11
14.	"Nine Million Bicycles" (acoustic version)	Batt	3:15
15.	"The Closest Thing to Crazy" (live version)	Melua	3:24
16.	"Thank You, Stars" (live version)	Batt	4:11

== Charts ==
=== Weekly charts ===
Weekly chart performance for Pictures
Chart (2007–08)	Peak position
Australian Albums (ARIA)	63
Austrian Albums (Ö3 Austria)	6
Belgian Albums (Ultratop Flanders)	10
Belgian Albums (Ultratop Wallonia)	2
Danish Albums (Hitlisten)	2
Dutch Albums (Album Top 100)	1
Finnish Albums (Suomen virallinen lista)	20
French Albums (SNEP)	4
German Albums (Offizielle Top 100)	2
Italian Albums (FIMI)	18
New Zealand Albums (RMNZ)	27
Norwegian Albums (VG-lista)	2
Polish Albums (ZPAV)	3
Portuguese Albums (AFP)	4
Scottish Albums (Official Charts)	4
Swedish Albums (Sverigetopplistan)	9
Swiss Albums (Schweizer Hitparade)	1
UK Albums (Official Charts)	2
UK Independent Albums (Official Charts)	1
US Heatseekers Albums (Billboard)	11

=== Year-end charts ===
2007 year-end chart performance for Pictures
Chart (2007)	Position
Austrian Albums (Ö3 Austria)	68
Belgian Albums (Ultratop Wallonia)	43
Dutch Albums (Album Top 100)	1
European Top 100 Albums (Billboard)	19
French Albums (SNEP)	85
German Albums (Offizielle Top 100)	42
Swedish Albums (Sverigetopplistan)	89
Swiss Albums (Schweizer Hitparade)	9
UK Albums (OCC)	49

2008 year-end chart performance for Pictures
Chart (2008)	Position
Belgian Albums (Ultratop Flanders)	51
Belgian Albums (Ultratop Wallonia)	15
Dutch Albums (Album Top 100)	27
European Top 100 Albums (Billboard)	29
German Albums (Offizielle Top 100)	53
Swiss Albums (Schweizer Hitparade)	29
UK Albums (OCC)	168

== Certifications ==
Region	Certification	Certified units/sales
Austria (IFPI Austria)	Gold	10,000^{*}
Belgium (BRMA)	Gold	15,000^{*}
Denmark (IFPI Danmark)	Platinum	30,000^{^}
France (SNEP)	Platinum	100,000^{‡}
Germany (BVMI)	Platinum	200,000^{^}
Ireland (IRMA)	Gold	7,500^{^}
Netherlands (NVPI)	Platinum	70,000^{^}
New Zealand (RMNZ)	Platinum	15,000^{‡}
Portugal (AFP)	Gold	10,000^{^}
Sweden (GLF)	Gold	20,000^{^}
Switzerland (IFPI Switzerland)	2× Platinum	60,000^{^}
United Kingdom (BPI)	Platinum	300,000^{^}
Summaries
Europe (IFPI)	Platinum	1,000,000^{*}
^{*} Sales figures based on certification alone.^{^} Shipments figures based on certification alone.^{‡} Sales+streaming figures based on certification alone.

== Release history ==
Pictures release history
Region	Date	Format	Label	Ref(s)
United Kingdom	1 October 2007	CD; digital download; vinyl	Dramatico	
United States	5 May 2009	CD; digital download; vinyl	Dramatico	
