= There for You =

"There for You" may refer to:

- "There for You" (Gorgon City and MK song), 2019
- "There for You" (Martin Garrix and Troye Sivan song), 2017
- "There for You" (Monét X Change song), 2019
- "There for You" (Hilary Roberts song), 2018
- Aap Ke Liye Hum (transl. There for You), an unreleased Indian Hindi-language film

== See also ==
- I'll Be There for You (disambiguation)
