= The O2 Arena =

Indoor arena in London, England

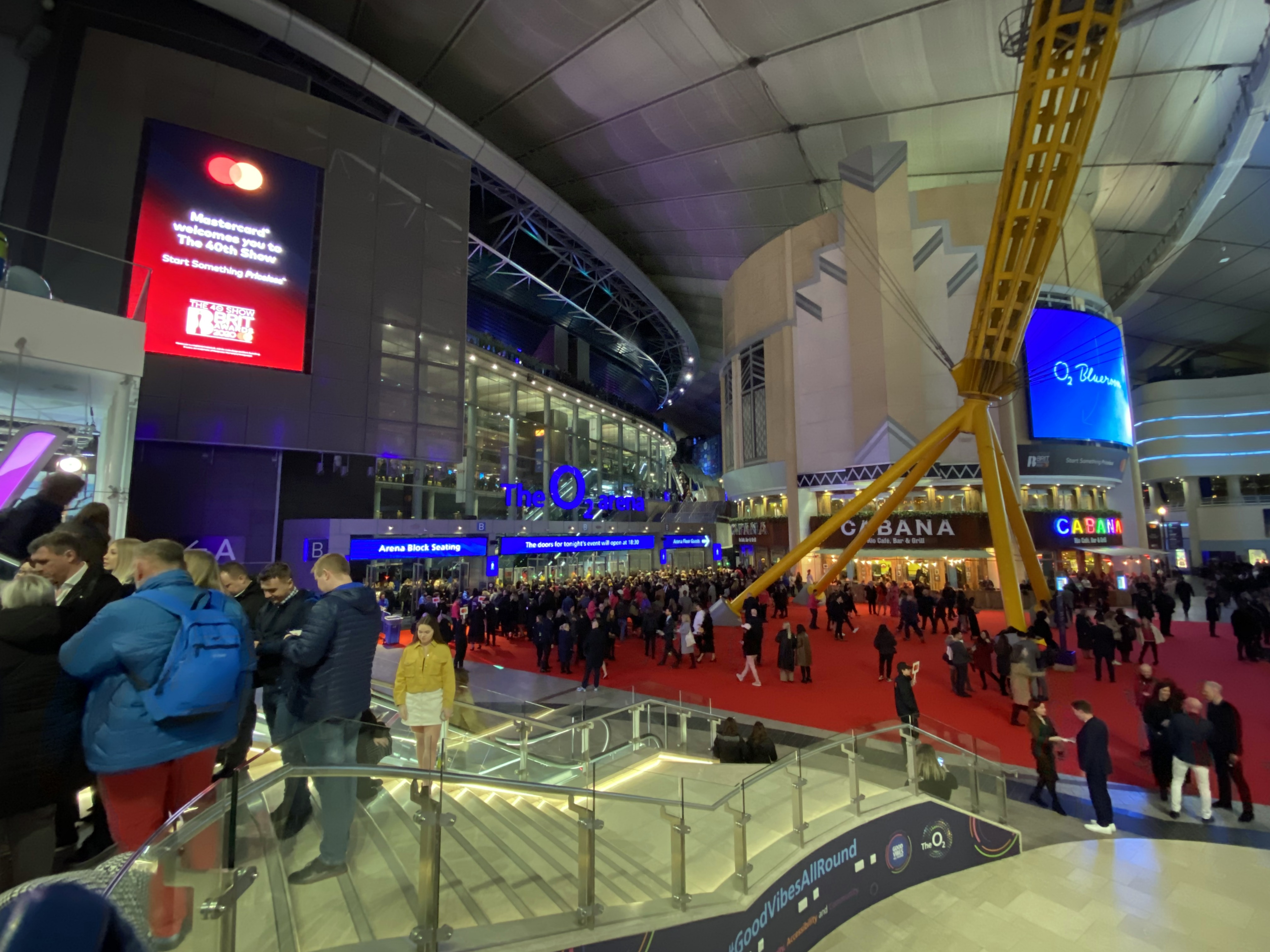
- Entrance to the arena in 2020
- Interactive map of The O2 Arena
- Full name: The O2 Arena
- Former names: North Greenwich Arena (during the 2012 Summer Olympics and Paralympics)
- Address: Peninsula Square
- Location: Greenwich, London, England
- Coordinates: 51.5029°N 0.0032°E
- Owner: AEG International
- Operator: AEG International
- Capacity: 20,000
- Surface: Versatile
- Public transit: North Greenwich

Construction
- Built: 2003–2007
- Opened: 24 June 2007
- Architect: HOK Sport (now Populous)
- Structural engineer: Buro Happold
- Services engineer: M-E Engineers Ltd.
- General contractor: Sir Robert McAlpine

Tenants
- 2012 Summer Olympics (2012); 2012 Summer Paralympics (2012); ATP Finals (2009–2020)

Website
- theo2.co.uk

The O2 Arena, locally referred to as the O2, is a multi-purpose indoor arena in the centre of the O2 entertainment district on the Greenwich Peninsula in south east London, England. It opened in its present form in 2007. It has the third-highest seating capacity of any indoor venue in the United Kingdom, behind Co-op Live and Manchester Arena, and in 2008, was the world's busiest music arena.

The arena and broader complex were built within the former Millennium Dome, a large dome-shaped building intended for an exhibition celebrating the turn of the third millennium. As of 2022, it is the ninth-largest building in the world by volume with a diameter of 365 metres (399 yards) and a height of 52 metres (57 yards). It is named after its primary sponsor, the telecommunications company O2, a subsidiary of Virgin Media O2. The nearest tube station is North Greenwich on the Jubilee line.

== History ==
Following the closure of the Millennium Experience at the end of 2000, the Millennium Dome was leased to Meridian Delta Ltd. in December 2001, for redevelopment as an entertainment complex. This included plans for an indoor arena.

Construction of the arena started in 2003, and finished in 2007. In December 2004, after the interior of the dome had been largely cleared and before building work inside began, the dome was used as the main venue for the annual Crisis Open Christmas organised by the London-based homelessness charity Crisis.

Owing to the impossibility of using cranes inside the dome structure, the arena's roof was constructed on the ground within the dome and then lifted; the arena building's structure was then built around the roof. The arena building, which houses the arena and the arena concourse, is independent from all other buildings in the O2 and houses all the arena's facilities. The arena building itself takes up 40% of the total dome structure.

The seating arrangement throughout the whole arena can be modified, similar to the AO Arena in Manchester. The ground surface can also be changed between ice rink, basketball court, exhibition space, conference venue, private hire venue and concert venue.

The arena was designed to reduce echoing, a problem common among older arenas used for concerts.

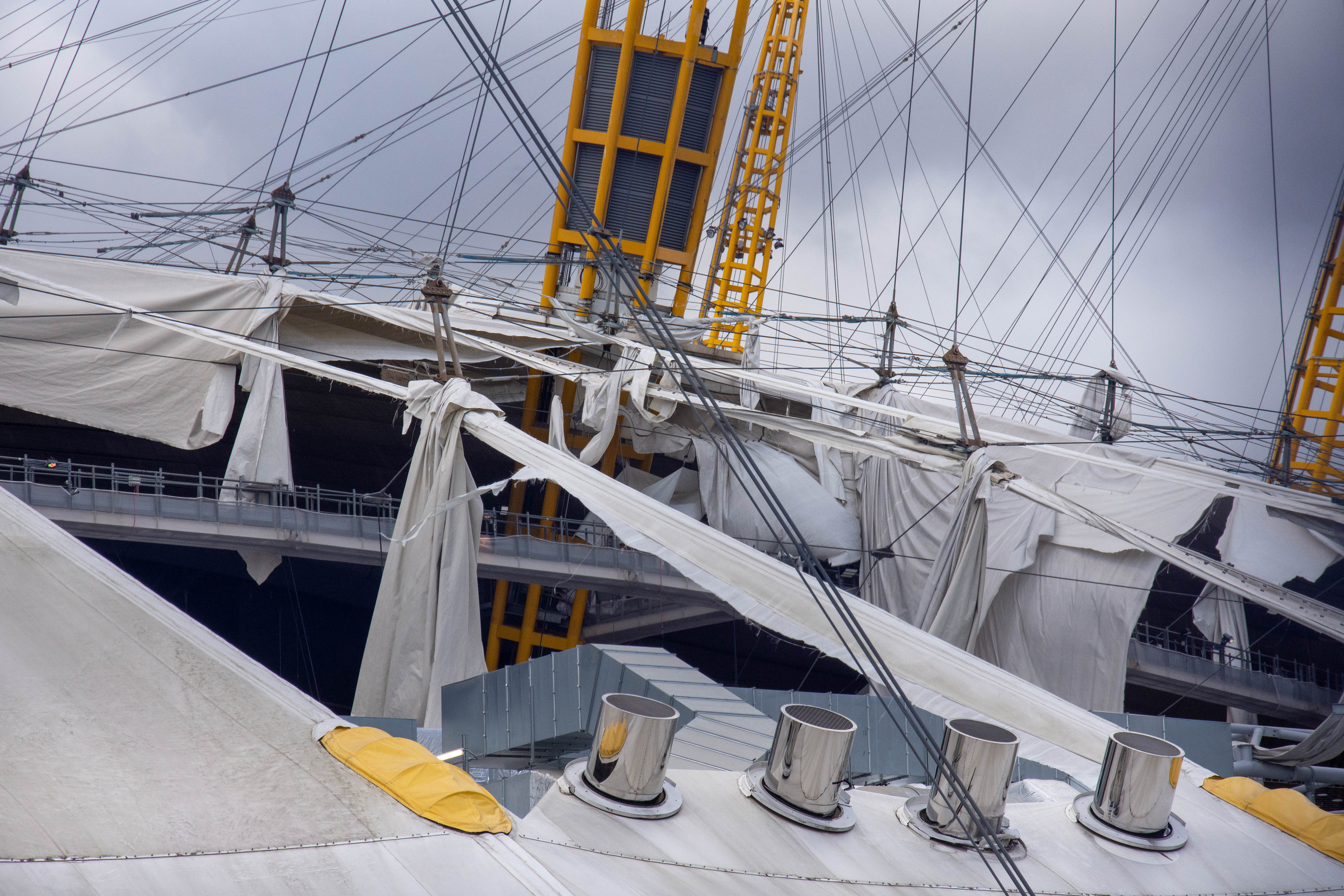
Damage to the O2's tent, above the roof of the O2 , caused by Storm Eunice (2022)

On 18 February 2022 during Storm Eunice, large sections of the arena's fabric roof were shredded, causing the evacuation of 1,000 people, and the venue to close. It was later announced that repair works would take place and that the arena was likely to reopen on 25 February 2022, for a UB40 concert. The repairs took place as planned, with the O2 arena reopened as scheduled.

== Events ==
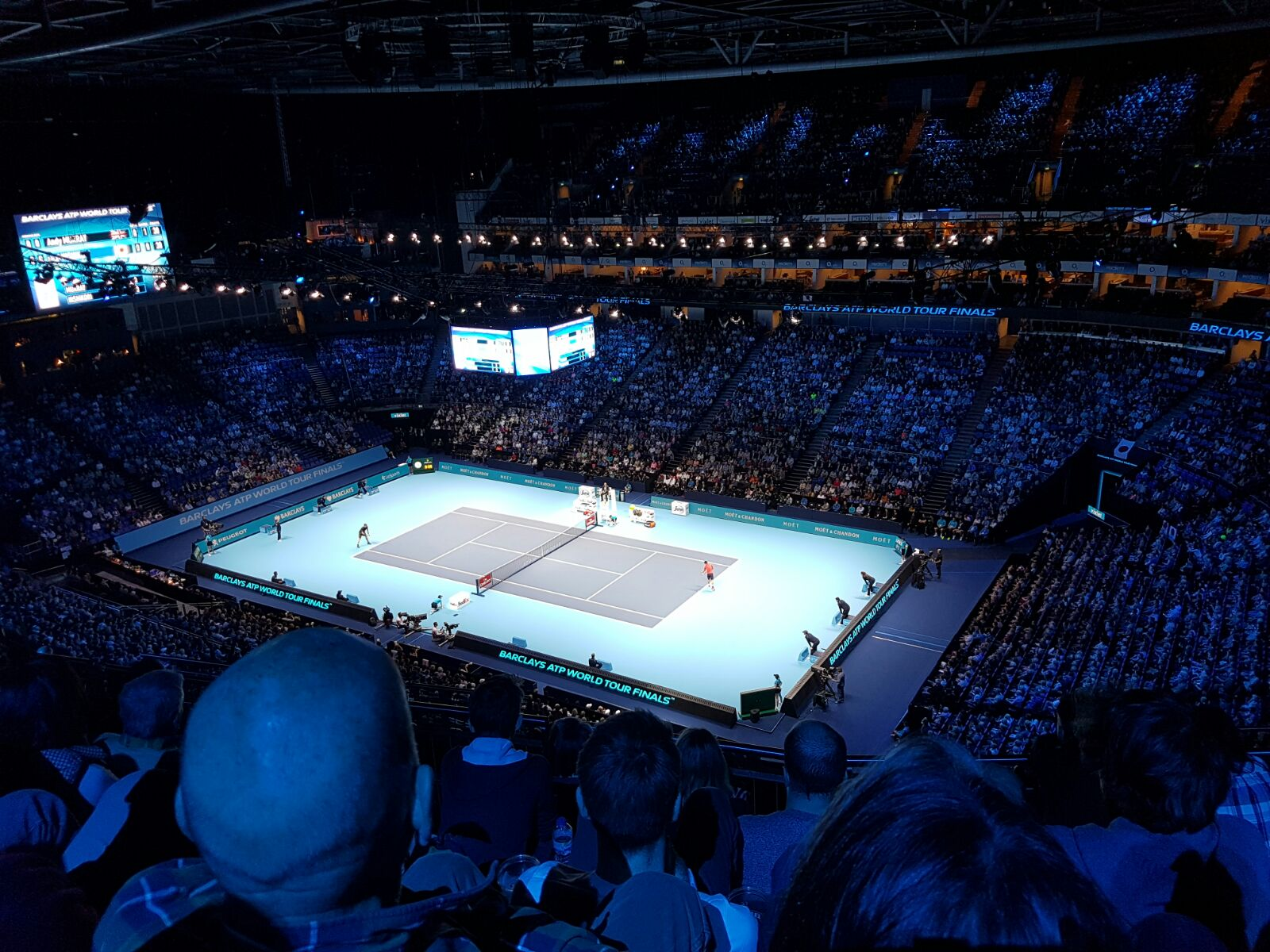
O2 Arena hosting a tennis match at the 2016 ATP World Tour Finals

The O2 arena has hosted a variety of events, including but not limited to: sports events, concerts, music festivals, comedy shows, conferences, and the Olympics. Beginning in July 2009, American singer Michael Jackson was scheduled to hold a 50-show residency at the arena, titled This Is It. However, he died on 25 June, eighteen days before the first scheduled show. During the 2012 Summer Olympics and Paralympics, the venue was referred as the North Greenwich Arena due to Olympics regulations regarding corporate sponsorship of event sites. The arena hosted the ATP World Tour Finals between 2009 and 2020.

Since March 2013, the arena has hosted C2C: Country to Country, Europe's largest country music festival, which annually attracts over 20,000 fans. UK and Irish acts, as well as up-and-coming American acts, perform sets several times across various pop-up stages in and around the arena, with the main stage accessible only to ticket-holders. The seventh C2C was held on 8–10 March 2019.

On 15 October 2022, the O2 hosted a boxing match between Claressa Shields and Savannah Marshall that was the first time two female boxers headlined at a major venue in the United Kingdom. Shields won, and the fight headlined the first all-female boxing card in the United Kingdom.

Roger Waters concert at The O2 Arena in 2011 as part of his The Wall Live tour (left) and Metallica Live at The O2 in October 2017 (right)

On 1 July 2023, the O2 Arena hosted WWE Money In The Bank, as well as the 30 June 2023 go-home episode of Friday Night SmackDown beforehand, which was the first time the show aired live on BT Sport (Now known as TNT Sports).

On 2 November 2024, the O2 Arena hosted the finals of the 2024 League of Legends World Championship. T1 of the League of Legends Champions Korea claimed their fifth title against Bilibili Gaming of China's League of Legends Pro League.

On 30 May 2025, heavy metal band Babymetal became the first Japanese artist to headline, and sell out, a show at the O2 arena.

On 26 August 2024 at All In, All Elite Wrestling (AEW) announced that the 2025 Forbidden Door will take place at the O2 Arena on 24 August 2025. The event broke the arena's record attendance for a professional wrestling event with 18,992 fans.

On 18 February 2025, the O2 Arena hosted F1 75 Live, the first ever collective season launch in Formula 1 history. Hosted by comedian Jack Whitehall, the event commemorated the sport's 75th anniversary year, featuring presentations from all 10 competing teams alongside musical performances by artists such as MGK, Kane Brown, Brian Tyler, and Take That.

== Ticket sales records ==
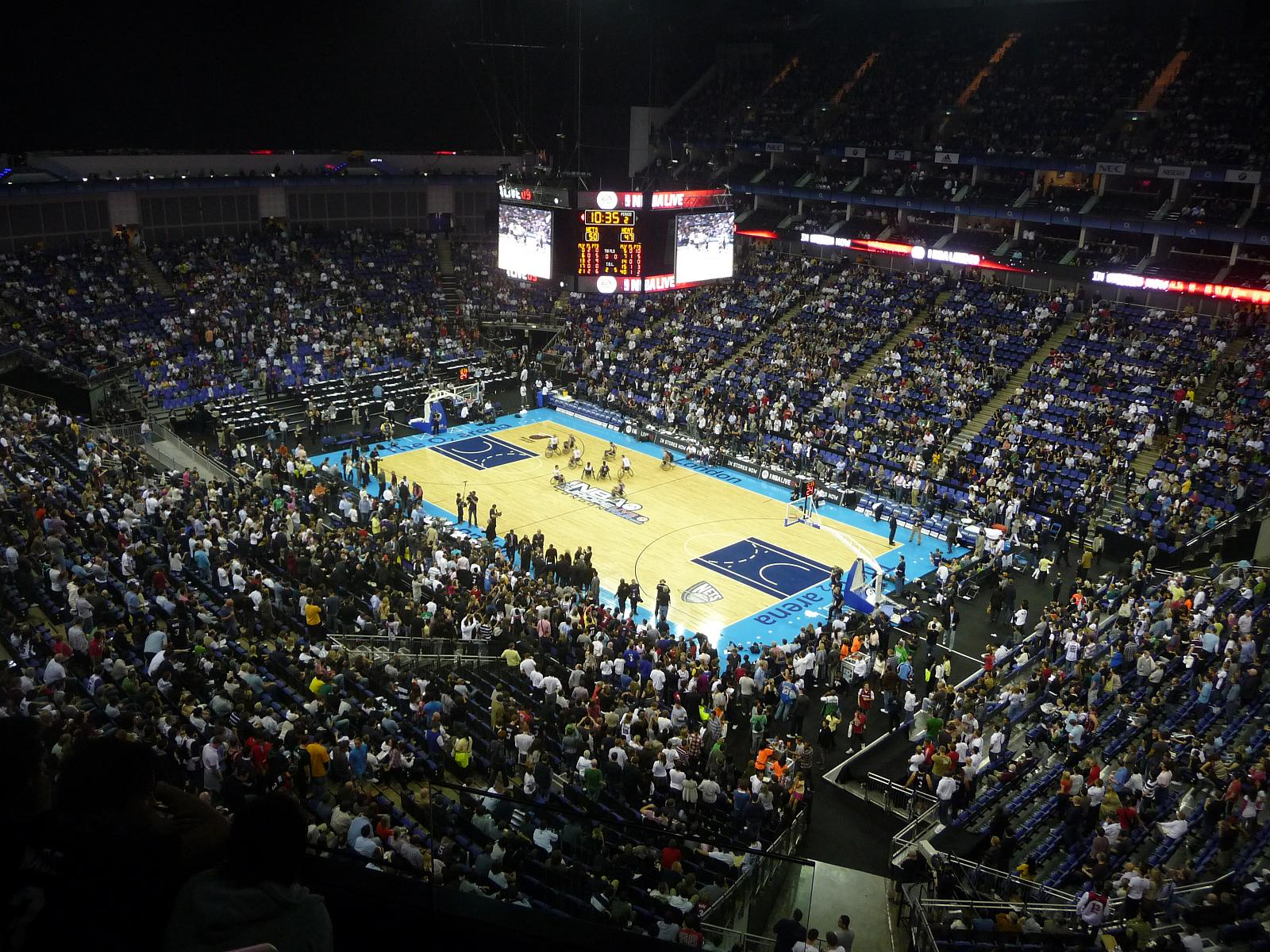
New Jersey Nets v Miami Heat, an NBA game in the O2 Arena

Despite being open for only 200 days per year (the equivalent of seven months), the venue sold over 1.2 million tickets in 2007, making it the third most popular venue in the world for concerts and family shows, narrowly behind the Manchester Arena (1.25 million) and Madison Square Garden in New York City (1.23 million).

As of 2023, the O2 Arena was the third busiest music arena in the world in terms of ticket sales.

World's Busiest Arenas – 2023
Venue	Ticket sales
Madison Square Garden, New York City, US	1,985,832
Movistar Arena, Santiago, Chile	1,451,098
The O2 Arena, London, UK	1,264,882
WiZink Center, Madrid, Spain	1,191,860
Accor Arena, Paris, France	1,134,237
Kia Forum, Inglewood, US	1,100,855
Dickies Arena, Fort Worth, US	1,015,253
OVO Hydro, Glasgow, UK	1,012,333
Lanxess Arena, Cologne, Germany	1,004,777
3Arena, Dublin, Ireland	975,640

== Prizes and awards ==
- 2016 Pollstar International Venue of the Year
- 2016 Billboard Touring Awards: Top Arena
- 2016 The London Venue Awards: Best Music Venue
- 2016 The Drum UK Event Awards: Large Venue of the Year
- 2017 Pollstar International Venue of the Year

== See also ==
- The O2
- Millennium Dome
- Live at the O² Arena
- List of indoor arenas in the United Kingdom
- List of tennis stadiums by capacity

Preceded by Qizhong Forest Sports City Arena; Shanghai	ATP Year-end Championships; Venue; 2009–2020	Succeeded by Pala Alpitour; Turin
Preceded by Sinan Erdem Dome; Istanbul	Euroleague; Final Four; Venue; 2013	Succeeded by Mediolanum Forum; Milan
