= Album No. 8 =

Studio album by Katie Melua
- Released: 16 October 2020
- Recorded: 2019–2020
- Studio: Tbilisi, Georgia
- Length: 37:18
- Label: BMG
- Producer: Leo Abrahams

Katie Melua chronology
Live in Concert (2019)	Album No. 8 (2020)	Love & Money (2023)

Singles from Album No. 8
- 1. "A Love like That" Released: 30 June 2020; 2. "Airtime" Released: 24 July 2020

Album No. 8 is the eighth studio album by British singer-songwriter Katie Melua. The album was released by BMG on 16 October 2020. The first single from the album, "A Love like That", was produced by Leo Abrahams and had its premiere on BBC Radio 2 on 30 June 2020. The second single, "Airtime", premiered on 24 July 2020.

== Background ==
Melua started writing and recording the album when she was in the process of separating from her estranged husband, World Superbike racer James Toseland. “We are both perfectionists,” Melua stated. “So we both really wanted to ‘get it right’. But in the end, I think we both accepted it was over and decided to perfect the art of letting go. I looked to nature for support and saw the falling leaves as part of a beautiful cycle."

== Critical reception ==
Professional ratings
Aggregate scores
Source	Rating
Metacritic	82/100
Review scores
Source	Rating
AllMusic	4/5 stars
American Songwriter	3.5/5 stars
The Arts Desk	3/5 stars
laut.de	4/5 stars
musicOMH	4/5 stars
The Telegraph	4/5 stars

Album No. 8 was met with universal acclaim from music critics. At Metacritic, which assigns a normalised rating out of 100 to reviews from professional critics, the album received a weighted average score of 82, based on four reviews.

== Track listing ==
Track listing adapted from Apple Music. Credits adapted from Spotify metadata. All music is composed by Leo Abrahams.

Album No.8 track listing
No.	Title	Writer(s)	Length
1.	"A Love Like That"	Katie Melua; Sam Dixon	3:08
2.	"English Manner"	K. Melua; Leo Abrahams; Tim Harries	4:27
3.	"Leaving the Mountain"	K. Melua; Zurab Melua	3:36
4.	"Joy"	K. Melua; Luke Potashnick	3:35
5.	"Voices in the Night"	K. Melua; Abrahams; Dixon	4:55
6.	"Maybe I Dreamt It"	K. Melua; Z. Melua	3:19
7.	"Heading Home"	K. Melua; Harries	3:46
8.	"Your Longing Is Gone"	K. Melua; Petter Ericson Stakke	3:25
9.	"Airtime"	K. Melua; Potashnick; Harries	3:26
10.	"Remind Me to Forget"	K. Melua; Potashnick; Harries	3:38
Total length:			37:18

== Charts ==
=== Weekly charts ===
Weekly chart performance for Album No. 8
Chart (2020)	Peak position
Austrian Albums (Ö3 Austria)	4
Belgian Albums (Ultratop Flanders)	33
Belgian Albums (Ultratop Wallonia)	19
Dutch Albums (Album Top 100)	38
French Albums (SNEP)	57
German Albums (Offizielle Top 100)	5
Polish Albums (ZPAV)	12
Portuguese Albums (AFP)	36
Scottish Albums (OCC)	7
Swiss Albums (Schweizer Hitparade)	2
UK Albums (OCC)	7
UK Independent Albums (OCC)	24

=== Year-end charts ===
Year-end chart performance for Album No. 8
Chart (2020)	Position
Swiss Albums (Schweizer Hitparade)	97
