= Ketevan (album) =

Studio album by Katie Melua
- Released: 16 September 2013
- Length: 40:10
- Label: Dramatico
- Producers: Mike Batt; Luke Batt

Katie Melua chronology
Secret Symphony (2012)	Ketevan (2013)	In Winter (2016)

Singles from Ketevan
- 1. "I Will Be There" Released: 12 July 2013; 2. "The Love I'm Frightened of" Released: 17 October 2013

Ketevan is the sixth studio album by British singer Katie Melua. It was released through Dramatico on 16 September 2013, coinciding with her 29th birthday. The album was produced by longtime collaborator Mike Batt alongside his son Luke. Born Ketevan in Georgia, Melua later adopted the name Katie, though her Georgian heritage remains central to the album's identity and themes. Described by Melua as one of her most personal works, the record reflects her dual Georgian-British identity, her ongoing connection to Georgia, and her regular communication with family in Georgian.

The album received mixed reviews from critics, who praised Melua's vocals, emotional delivery, and the album's cinematic, orchestral production, while others criticized its unevenness, with some reviewers finding the second half overly formulaic or monotonous compared to its stronger opening. Commercially, Ketevan achieved moderate success across Europe, reaching the top 10 in multiple countries including the United Kingdom, Germany, Austria, Poland, Switzerland, Denmark, and the Netherlands, and earning a Silver certification from the British Phonographic Industry (BPI) for 60,000 units sold.

== Background ==
The album was produced by longtime collaborator Mike Batt and his son Luke. Melua has described Ketevan as one of her most personal works, reflecting her continued ties to Georgia, where she regularly returns and communicates with her family in Georgian. Although she has long been associated with the United Kingdom, she was born in Georgia and only became a British citizen at the age of 21, a dual identity that informs the thematic foundation of the record. At birth, she was given the name Ketevan, later adopting the name Katie.

The album title serves both as a personal reference and as an acknowledgment of the musical influences of her country of origin, including occasional use of Georgian stylistic elements. One of the album's tracks, "Love Is a Silent Thief," is dedicated to Georgian filmmaker Sergei Parajanov and incorporates visual references from his film The Color of Pomegranates (1969), highlighting his artistic legacy under Soviet-era constraints. Alongside these cultural themes, the album also explores aspects of her private life, including marriage, as reflected in songs such as "This Is The Love I'm Frightened of," which Melua has noted can be interpreted in relation to her own experiences.

== Promotion ==
The lead single promoting the album, "I Will Be There", was released on 12 July 2013, together with an accompanying music video of a concert version of the song. A music video for "Love Is a Silent Thief" was released onto YouTube on 13 September 2013. A video for "The Love I'm Frightened Of" was released on 7 October.

== Critical reception ==
Professional ratings
Review scores
Source	Rating
AllMusic	3.5/5 stars
Daily Express	3/5 stars
laut.de	3/5 stars

In a review for AllMusic, Matt Collar described Ketevan as a "languid, often cinematic-sounding" album that continues Melua's orchestral direction following Secret Symphony. He praised her "crystalline technique" and "softly soulful style," highlighting tracks like "Love Is a Silent Thief" and "Chase Me." Collar also commended Mike Batt's arrangements and called the album "fluid and utterly gorgeous" and "a unique and delicate vessel." Francesca Tichon from Renowned for Sound found that Ketevan was "wonderfully old-school and effortlessly beautiful," describing it as a relaxed and stylistically varied album and praising its blend of piano, strings, and subtle electronic elements. She concluded that it was "an album that will never go out of style," highlighting Melua's "unique and astonishing voice" across multiple genres.

Writing for laut.de, Ulf Kubanke wrote that Ketevan was "in parts better achieved" than Melua's previous work and praised her "vocal charisma." He described the album's first half as "a real spectacle," highlighting "Never Felt Less Like Dancing" as a "perfectly nuanced tearjerker" and "Shiver And Shake" as a standout track. However, he criticized the second half for falling into "well-crafted standard templates" and "polished boredom," arguing that the album loses strength after its strong opening. Daily Express critic Stephen Unwin described Melua's voice as "so drippy it nearly short-circuits the radio" and criticized the album's "monotony" as "middle-of-the-road." He suggested the record was "very successful history repeating itself," noting its reliance on familiar collaboration with Batt and a largely unchanged musical approach.

== Commercial performance ==
Ketevan achieved moderate commercial success, reaching the top 10 in several European markets including number 6 in the United Kingdom, Germany, Austria, Poland, and Switzerland, number 2 in Denmark, and number 5 in the Netherlands, while also charting across Belgium, France, and Scandinavia. In year-end rankings it appeared lower overall, and was certified Silver by the British Phonographic Industry (BPI) for sales of 60,000 units, indicating a smaller commercial impact compared to her earlier multi-platinum releases but continued consistent international chart presence.

== Track listing ==
Ketevan track listing
No.	Title	Writer(s)	Length
1.	"Never Felt Less Like Dancing"	Mike Batt	4:12
2.	"Sailing Ships from Heaven"	M. Batt	5:01
3.	"Love Is a Silent Thief"	Katie Melua; Toby Jepson	3:00
4.	"Shiver and Shake"	Melua; Luke Batt	2:59
5.	"The Love I'm Frightened Of"	Luke Batt	3:35
6.	"Where Does the Ocean Go?"	Melua; M. Batt; L. Batt	3:37
7.	"Idiot School"	M. Batt	3:35
8.	"Mad, Mad Men"	M. Batt	3:21
9.	"Chase Me"	Melua; Jepson	3:41
10.	"I Never Fall"	Melua; L. Batt	2:46
11.	"I Will Be There"	M. Batt	4:18
Total length:			40:10

iTunes Bonus Track
No.	Title	Writer(s)	Length
12.	"I Never Fall" (Strings Version)	Melua; L. Batt	2:45

== Personnel ==
- Katie Melua – vocals
- Tim Harries – bass
- Mike Batt – piano, accordion, harmonium, backing vocals
- Dan Hawkins – bass
- Luke Batt – guitar, piano, drums, percussion
- Joe Yoshida – drums
- Henry Spinetti – drums, percussion
- Chris Spedding – guitar
- Freddie Hill – drums
- Paul Stevens – clarinet
- John Parricelli – ukulele, guitar, banjo
- Paul Jones – harmonica
- Fabien Taverne – ukulele

== Charts ==
=== Weekly charts ===
Weekly chart performance for Ketevan
Charts (2013)	Peak position
Austrian Albums (Ö3 Austria)	6
Belgian Albums (Ultratop Flanders)	15
Belgian Albums (Ultratop Wallonia)	8
Danish Albums (Hitlisten)	2
Dutch Albums (Album Top 100)	5
Finnish Albums (Suomen virallinen lista)	41
French Albums (SNEP)	9
German Albums (Offizielle Top 100)	6
Irish Albums (IRMA)	38
Norwegian Albums (VG-lista)	12
Polish Albums (ZPAV)	6
Scottish Albums (Official Charts)	7
Spanish Albums (Promusicae)	80
Swedish Albums (Sverigetopplistan)	38
Swiss Albums (Schweizer Hitparade)	6
UK Albums (Official Charts)	6
UK Independent Albums (Official Charts)	3

=== Year-end charts ===
Year-end chart performance for Ketevan
Chart (2013)	Position
Belgian Albums (Ultratop Flanders)	158
Belgian Albums (Ultratop Wallonia)	80
French Albums (SNEP)	167
Swiss Albums (Schweizer Hitparade)	78
UK Albums (OCC)	167

== Certifications ==
Certifications for Ketevan
Region	Certification	Certified units/sales
United Kingdom (BPI)	Silver	60,000^{*}
^{*} Sales figures based on certification alone.
