= Love & Money (album) =

Studio album by Katie Melua
- Released: 24 March 2023
- Recorded: Mid-2022
- Studio: Real World Studios (Wiltshire); RAK Studios (London); Home studios (UK and Germany)
- Length: 35:50
- Label: BMG
- Producer: Leo Abrahams

Katie Melua chronology
Album No. 8 (2020)	Love & Money (2023)

Singles from Love & Money
- 1. "Golden Record" Released: 12 January 2023; 2. "Those Sweet Days" Released: 3 February 2023; 3. "Quiet Moves" Released: 1 March 2023

Love & Money is the ninth studio album by Georgian-British singer-songwriter Katie Melua. It was released on 24 March 2023 with 10 tracks through BMG Rights Management.

== Background ==
In January 2023, Melua announced the album, "a stunning and personal 10 track glimpse" into the life and journey of the singer-songwriter. It was once again produced by Leo Abrahams, while recording took place in summer 2022 at Real World Studios, owned by Peter Gabriel. Ahead of the news, she announced the Love & Money tour through Europe in November 2022.

== Critical reception ==
Professional ratings
Review scores
Source	Rating
AllMusic	4/5 stars
laut.de	2/5 stars

Love & Money received generally positive reviews from music critics. To Matt Collar of AllMusic, it felt like Melua was "happy and wants to mark the occasion", calling the record a "subtle, yet palpable shift" from her previous album (2020). Collar thought that if Love & Money represents the sound of Melua "getting carried away", "it seems to suit her just fine".

In a mixed review, Josephine Maria Bayer at Laut.de thought it was "inexplicable" how Melua renounced her former "warm band and orchestra sound". According to Bayer, it would have suited Melua better if she had taken a longer creative break, saying that the production on the album cannot "keep up with the brilliance" of her previous works.

== Track listing ==
Love & Money track listing
No.	Title	Writer(s)	Length
1.	"Golden Record"	Katie Melua; Will Taylor	3:33
2.	"Quiet Moves"	K. Melua; Taylor; Tobias Kuhn	3:58
3.	"14 Windows"	K. Melua; Abrahams; Petter Ericson Stakee	3:45
4.	"Lie in the Heat"	K. Melua; Abrahams; Zurab Melua	2:48
5.	"Darling Star"	K. Melua; Z. Melua	3:11
6.	"Reefs"	K. Melua; Stakee	4:36
7.	"First Date"	K. Melua; Tim Harries	3:35
8.	"Pick Me Up"	K. Melua; Abrahams; Taylor; Z. Melua	3:39
9.	"Those Sweet Days"	K. Melua; Abrahams; Jeremy Warmsley	3:25
10.	"Love & Money"	K. Melua; Taylor	3:20
Total length:			35:50

== Charts ==
Chart performance for Love & Money
Chart (2023)	Peak position
Austrian Albums (Ö3 Austria)	29
Belgian Albums (Ultratop Flanders)	67
Belgian Albums (Ultratop Wallonia)	27
Dutch Albums (Album Top 100)	77
French Albums (SNEP)	91
German Albums (Offizielle Top 100)	9
Polish Albums (ZPAV)	25
Scottish Albums (OCC)	12
Swiss Albums (Schweizer Hitparade)	7
UK Albums (OCC)	35
UK Independent Albums (OCC)	2
