= If You Were a Sailboat =

Single by Katie Melua

from the album Pictures
- B-side: "Junk Mail", "Straight to DVD", "This Year's Love"
- Released: 24 September 2007
- Genre: Acoustic; blues
- Label: Dramatico
- Songwriter: Mike Batt
- Producer: Mike Batt

Katie Melua singles chronology
"Shy Boy" (2006)	"If You Were a Sailboat" (2007)	"Mary Pickford" (2007)

"If You Were a Sailboat" is a song by British singer Katie Melua. Written and produced by Mike Batt, it is Melua's ninth single and the first from her third album, Pictures (2007). Melua said of the song:

What I liked about the song is the fact that a lot of love songs tend to deal with the fluffy nice side of love, but this one deals with how you get very selfish when you fall in love with someone, and you don't want to share them with the world, you just want them all about yourself. What's genius about Mike's lyrics is that instead of saying that directly he uses these crazy strange metaphors, "if you were a piece of wood I'd nail you to the floor" and quite bizarre stuff and I like that. Musically it sounds like a really nice smooth love song, but the message is pretty intense and quite dark.

It was released as a single on September 24, 2007. The CD single has three extra tracks exclusive to the release, including a version of David Gray's "This Year's Love". In the week of 30 September, the song debuted at number twenty-three on the UK Singles Chart.

== Prince version ==
World renowned performing artist Prince recorded a version of the song, which remains unreleased as of 2024. It is, however, currently available on YouTube. Prince asked for Mike Batt's permission to change the lyrics, changing the words "cowboy" to "gypsy" and "preacher" to "witness."

== Parody version ==
Mark Radcliffe of BBC Radio 2 was amused by the lyric 'If you were a piece of wood, I'd nail you to the floor', and asked his listeners to send in equally strange lyrics and compose a parody song for her to sing, not expecting her actually to do so.

However, as she did on another show with "Nine Million Bicycles", Melua contacted the show and agreed to play the song. The lyrics included 'If you were some tiling, I would grout you.' and 'If you were ten pints of beer, I would drink you down my dear'.

== Track listings ==
1. "If You Were a Sailboat"
2. "Junk Mail"
3. "Straight to DVD"
4. "This Year's Love"

== Charts ==
=== Weekly charts ===
Chart (2007–2008)	Peak position
Belgium (Ultratop 50 Flanders)	15
Belgium (Ultratop 50 Wallonia)	13
Denmark (Tracklisten)	31
Germany (GfK)	62
Netherlands (Single Top 100)	10
Norway (VG-lista)	5
Poland (Polish Airplay Charts)	4
Switzerland (Schweizer Hitparade)	12
UK Singles (OCC)	23
UK Indie (OCC)	2

=== Year-end charts ===
Chart (2007)	Position
Switzerland (Schweizer Hitparade)	97
Chart (2008)	Position
Belgium (Ultratop Flanders)	92
Belgium (Ultratop Wallonia)	65
Switzerland (Schweizer Hitparade)	99
