= Mary Pickford (Used to Eat Roses) =

Single by Katie Melua

from the album Pictures
- Released: 26 November 2007
- Genre: Folk; baroque pop; easy listening
- Length: 3:12
- Label: Dramatico
- Songwriter: Mike Batt
- Producer: Mike Batt

Katie Melua singles chronology
"If You Were a Sailboat" (2007)	"Mary Pickford" (2007)	"If the Lights Go Out" (2008)

"Mary Pickford" is a song written and produced by Mike Batt for the Georgian-born, British singer Katie Melua. It is Melua's tenth single and the second from her third album, Pictures. It was originally inspired by a daily facts calendar owned by Batt that one day featured the fact that Mary Pickford used to eat roses.

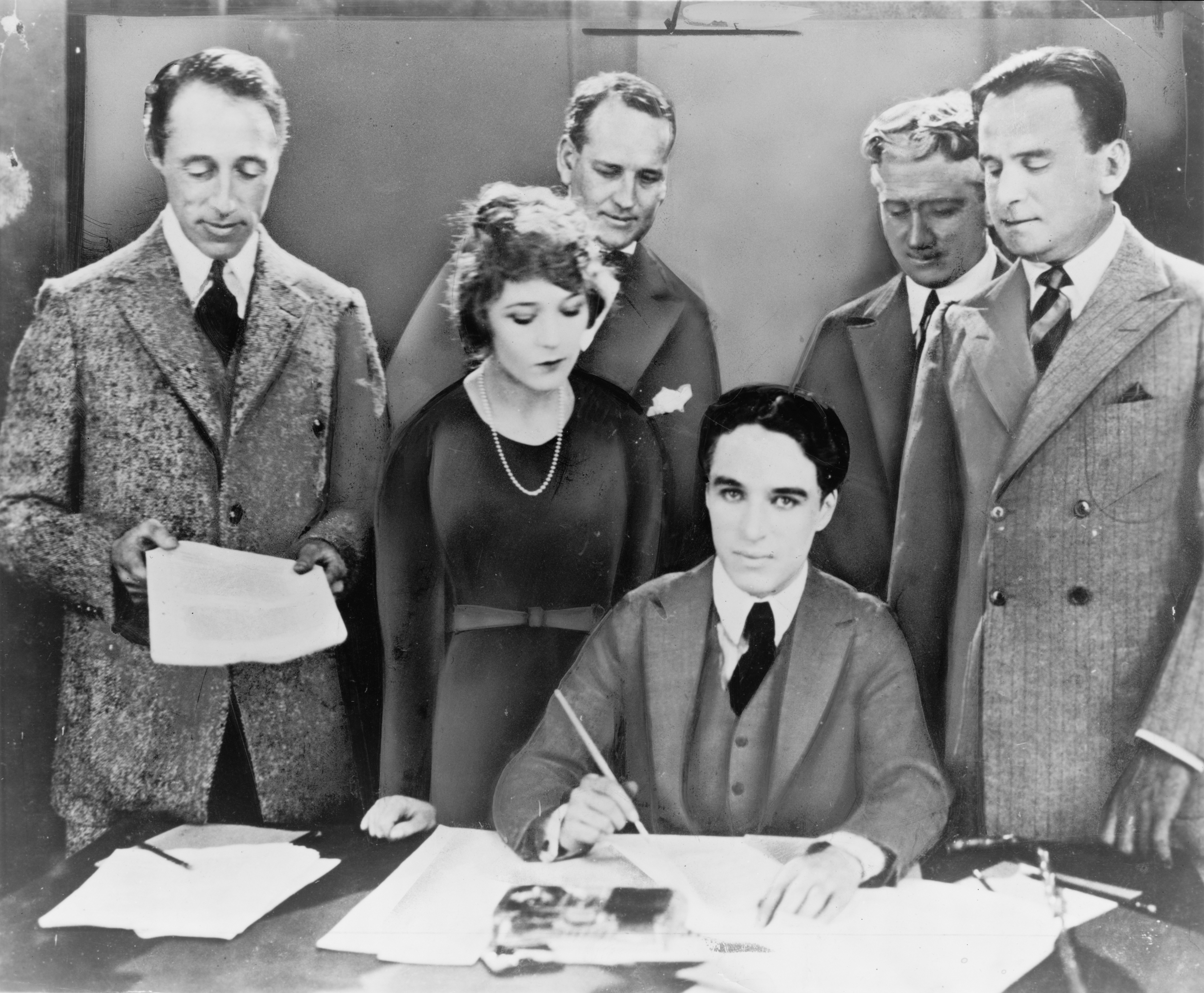
The founding of United Artists. Front row, left to right: D. W. Griffith, Mary Pickford, Charlie Chaplin and Douglas Fairbanks with two lawyers (rear)

The lyrics talk about the 1910s film actress Mary Pickford and other founders of United Artists. Mentioned in the song are Douglas Fairbanks, Charlie Chaplin, D. W. Griffith, United Artists and Pickfair.

The song can be seen as a pastiche of the classic silent era Joseph H. Santly song At the Moving Picture Ball since they have a similar rhythm, similar subject matter and indeed they list the same silent-era movie stars. However, the song may also be seen as a simple literary archetype having nothing whatsoever to do with the Santly tune, and instead being a reflection upon things in life that, for whatever reason and with whatever lofty components assembled, never seem to work. Furthermore, since United Artists and its cadre were all of the same era and predominantly visible in their day, it's reasonable to conclude that any song written about the era would include Fairbanks, Pickford, Chaplin, et al., not as a borrowed vignette of someone else's work, but from the verified history.
