= Katie Melua =

British singer (born 1984)

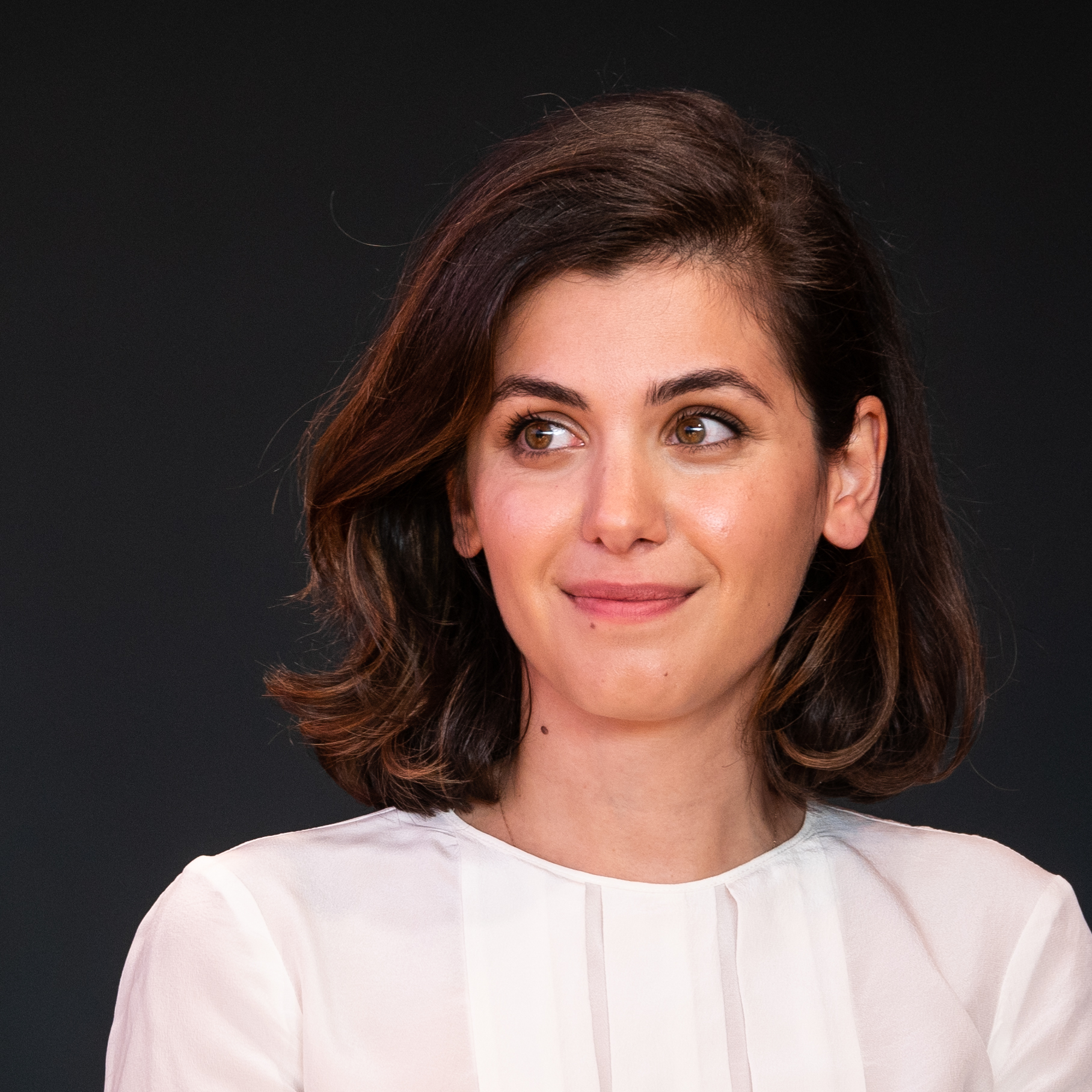
- Melua in 2017

Background information
- Born: Ketevan Melua; 16 September 1984 (age 42); Kutaisi, Georgian SSR, Soviet Union
- Origin: London, England
- Genres: Blues; folk-pop; jazz; easy listening
- Occupations: Singer; musician
- Instruments: Vocals; guitar; piano
- Years active: 2000–present
- Labels: Dramatico; BMG
- Spouse: James Toseland (m. 2012; div. 2020)
- Website: katiemelua.com

Ketevan "Katie" Melua (/ˈmɛluːə/; Georgian: ქეთევან "ქეთი" მელუა, IPA: [kʰetʰevan melua]; born 16 September 1984) is a singer from the United Kingdom. She was born in Kutaisi, Georgia and raised in Belfast and London. Under the management of composer Mike Batt, she was signed to the small Dramatico record label. She made her musical debut in 2003 and within three years, she was the United Kingdom's best-selling female artist as well as Europe's highest-selling female artist.

In November 2003, Melua released her first album, Call Off the Search, which reached the top of the United Kingdom album charts and sold 1.8 million copies in its first five months of release. Her second album, Piece by Piece, was released in September 2005, and to date has gone platinum (one million units sold) four times. She released her third studio album Pictures in October 2007.

According to the Sunday Times Rich List 2008, Melua had amassed a fortune of £18 million, making her the seventh-richest British musician under the age of 30.

== Early life ==
Ketevan Melua was born on 16 September 1984 to Amiran and Tamara Melua in Kutaisi, Georgia, which was then part of the Soviet Union. She is also partly of Canadian and Russian ancestry. She was baptised into the Georgian Orthodox Church. Melua spent her first years with her grandparents in Tbilisi before moving with her parents and brother to the city of Batumi, where her father worked as a heart specialist. During this time, she sometimes had to carry buckets of water up five flights of stairs to her family's flat and according to her, "Now, when I'm staying in luxurious hotels, I think back to those days".

In 1993, the family emigrated to Belfast, Northern Ireland in the aftermath of the Georgian Civil War. Her father, a heart surgeon, took up a position at the Royal Victoria Hospital. The family remained in Belfast, living close to Falls Road, until she was 14. During her time in Northern Ireland, she attended the Roman Catholic schools St Catherine's Primary School and Dominican College, Fortwilliam, while her younger brother attended state schools.

The family then moved to Sutton, London and some time later moved again to Redhill, Surrey. In 2008, Melua moved out of her parents' home in Maida Vale to an apartment in Notting Hill, where she transformed the spare bedroom into a recording studio.

After completing her GCSEs at the all-girls' grammar school Nonsuch High School in Cheam, she attended the BRIT School for the Performing Arts in the London Borough of Croydon, undertaking a BTEC with an A-level in music.

== Nationality ==
On 10 August 2005, just before she turned 21, Melua became a British citizen along with her parents and brother. The citizenship ceremony took place in Weybridge, Surrey. Becoming a British citizen meant that Melua had held three citizenships before she was 21; first Soviet, Georgian and currently, British.

After the ceremony, Melua stated her pride at her newest nationality. "As a family, we have been very fortunate to find a happy lifestyle in this country and we feel we belong. We still consider ourselves to be Georgian, because that is where our roots are, and I return to Georgia every year to see my uncles and grandparents, but I am proud to now be a British citizen".

== Personal life ==
Melua is fluent in English and speaks some Russian; despite still speaking her native Georgian fluently she has said that she cannot write songs in the language.

Melua has been referred to as an 'adrenaline junkie' because she enjoys roller coasters and funfairs and often paraglides and hang glides. She has skydived four times and taken several flying lessons, and in 2004 she was lowered from a 200-metre (660 ft) building in New Zealand at 60 mph (97 km/h). When asked about Melua being an 'adrenaline junkie', Mike Batt said, "she enjoys extremes, but in life her emotions are always in check". In November 2009, Melua nearly drowned while diving in a lake near Heathrow Airport.

In September 2010, Melua was ordered by her doctors to stop working for a few months after suffering a nervous breakdown, resulting in her hospitalisation for six weeks. As a result, all touring and promotional activities were postponed until the following year.

Melua opened up about the breakdown years later in an interview with The Independent, saying that it ended up being one of the best things that had ever happened to her, as she said it helped to quash a feeling of superiority she felt by being a successful musician in the music industry. "It was petrifying, but it put a stop to fantasies of being able to do anything. The oddest thing about this job is the sense of superiority you get. It was a huge wake-up call. I was completely out of it for two weeks, and in hospital for six. There was a bunch of things going on, things at home and crazy work schedules, and you really believe the world revolved around you and it doesn't."

In January 2012, Melua confirmed her engagement to World Superbike racer and musician James Toseland. The couple married on 1 September 2012 in the Nash Conservatory at the Royal Botanic Gardens in Kew, southwest London. A 2020 interview with the national Swedish news agency TT revealed that the couple had separated. Interviewed on ITV's Lorraine live from West London on 16 October 2020, Melua confirmed that the couple had divorced.

In August 2022, Melua announced her pregnancy with her first child and gave birth to her son, Sandro, in November. Speaking to ITV News in March 2023 ahead of her European tour, Melua said that she should not have to choose between childcare and her career and that Sandro would accompany her throughout the tour.. In November 2026, Melua announced the birth of her second son, Max.

== Career ==
=== Early stage ===
After an upbringing in politically unstable Georgia, Melua planned initially to become either an historian or a politician. This changed in 2000, at the age of 15, when Melua took part in a talent competition on British television channel ITV called "Stars Up Their Noses" (a spoof of Stars in Their Eyes) as part of the children's programme Mad for It. Melua won the contest by singing Badfinger's "Without You". The prize was £350 worth of MFI vouchers, with which she bought a chair for her father. Had she lost the contest, she would have been gunged.

=== BRIT School and Mike Batt ===
After completing her GCSEs, Melua attended the BRIT School for the Performing Arts in the London Borough of Croydon, undertaking a BTEC with an A-level in music. When studying at the school, Melua began to write songs and met her future manager and producer, Mike Batt.

While performing at BRIT School showcase, Melua caught the eye of songwriter and producer Mike Batt. Batt was originally looking for an acid-rock band, bass player and a singer capable of singing "jazz and blues in an interesting way". After hearing Melua sing "Faraway Voice" (a song she wrote about the death of her idol Eva Cassidy) Batt signed the 18-year-old Melua to his small Dramatico recording and management company and took her into the studio, producing her first three albums during the subsequent years, plus her fifth and sixth albums.

=== William Orbit ===
For her fourth album, The House (2010), Melua worked with producer William Orbit. She said about the experience: "The whole thing has been really exciting. It was the same feeling I had the first time I went skydiving. I was really quite nervous, but I knew all I had to do was let myself go and it was going to feel amazing. I wasn't trying to get away from anything. It was more about going towards something. I wanted the music to be inspired by the future, something unknown that's never been heard before, but at the same time hold on to the values of the music of the past, to try and tap into something that's so ancient and old that it's kind of forgotten. I thought that, if we went far enough in both directions, we could end up in the same place". Melua would collaborate again with Orbit over a decade later on Orbit's 2022 album, The Painter, on the opening track "Duende".

== Recordings ==
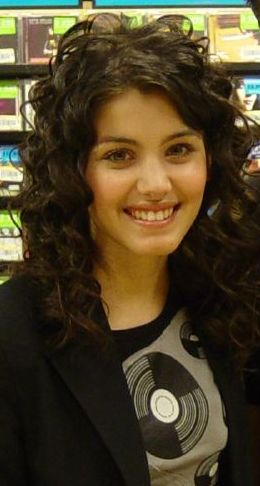
Melua at a signing in 2004

=== Call off the Search (2003) ===
Melua's debut album, Call Off the Search, was released on 3 November 2003 and featured two songs written by Melua: "Belfast (Penguins and Cats)", a song about Melua's experience of her time in the troubled capital of Northern Ireland, and "Faraway Voice", a song about the death of Eva Cassidy. Melua also covered songs by Delores J. Silver ("Learnin' the Blues"), John Mayall ("Crawling up a Hill"), Randy Newman ("I Think It's Going to Rain Today") and James Shelton ("Lilac Wine", originally a UK hit for singer Elkie Brooks). The other six songs on the album were written by Mike Batt.

It was initially difficult for Melua and Batt to obtain airplay for the album's lead single, the Mike Batt song "The Closest Thing to Crazy". This changed when BBC Radio 2 producer Paul Walters heard the single and played it on the popular Sir Terry Wogan breakfast show. Wogan played "The Closest Thing to Crazy" frequently in the summer of 2003. Wogan's support raised Melua's profile and when Call Off the Search was released in November 2003 supported by a TV campaign financed by Batt, it entered the top 40 UK albums chart. The single achieved the number 10 spot in the UK chart. After an appearance on the Royal Variety Show the album was further boosted and Batt continued a relentless marketing campaign which saw the album hit the number one spot in January 2004. Call Off the Search reached the top five in Ireland, top 20 in Norway and top 30 in a composite European chart. In the UK the album sold 1.9 million copies, making it six times platinum, and spent six weeks at the top of the UK charts. Subsequent singles from the album did not repeat the success of the first – the second single and album title track "Call Off the Search" reached number 19, and the third single "Crawling up a Hill" got to number 41.

Melua released a 20th Anniversary Edition of the album on 3 November 2023.

=== Piece by Piece (2005) ===
Melua's second album, Piece by Piece, was released on 26 September 2005. Its lead single was the Mike Batt song, "Nine Million Bicycles", which was released a week before the album on 19 September and was number three in the UK singles chart. The album contains four songs written by Melua, four by Batt (including "Nine Million Bicycles"), one Batt/Melua collaboration and three more songs described as new versions of "great songs". The band line-up was the same as on the first album. The album debuted at the number one spot on the UK Albums Chart in the week of 3 October 2005. This album broke Melua across Europe where it sold 1 million copies in Germany alone and achieved the number one position in Billboard's "European" albums chart.

On 30 September 2005, Melua came under criticism in The Guardian from writer and scientist Simon Singh for the lyrics (written by Mike Batt) of the track "Nine Million Bicycles". Batt's disputed lyrics were:

We are 12 billion light-years from the edge. That's a guess – no-one can ever say it's true, but I know that I will always be with you.

They were interpreted by Singh as an assault on the accuracy of the work of cosmologists which sparked a series of letters from other Guardian readers, agreeing or disagreeing. On 15 October, Melua and Singh appeared on the BBC's Today programme, and Melua light-heartedly performed the song during the interview, including Singh's tongue-in-cheek amendments to the lyrics:

We are 13.7 billion light-years from the edge of the observable universe / That's a good estimate with well-defined error bars / And with the available information / I predict that I will always be with you.

Both sides amicably agreed that the new lyrics were less likely to achieve commercial success, amidst a discussion about scientific accuracy versus artistic licence. Melua said that she "should have known better" because she used to be a member of the astronomy club at school.

A double A-side of the Melua-penned "I Cried for You" and a cover of The Cure's "Just Like Heaven" (1988), which also appeared on the soundtrack to the film Just Like Heaven, was released in the UK on 5 December and peaked at number 35. "I Cried for You" was inspired by a meeting with Michael Baigent, one of the writers of Holy Blood, Holy Grail.

A third single, "Spider's Web" was released on 17 April 2006 and peaked at number 52 in the UK. Melua embarked on a concert tour in support of Piece by Piece, the UK leg of which started in Aberdeen, Scotland on 20 January 2006. Towards the end of 2006, Melua released the single, "It's Only Pain", which was written by Mike Batt. This was followed by the release of "Shy Boy", also written by Batt.

=== Pictures (2007) ===
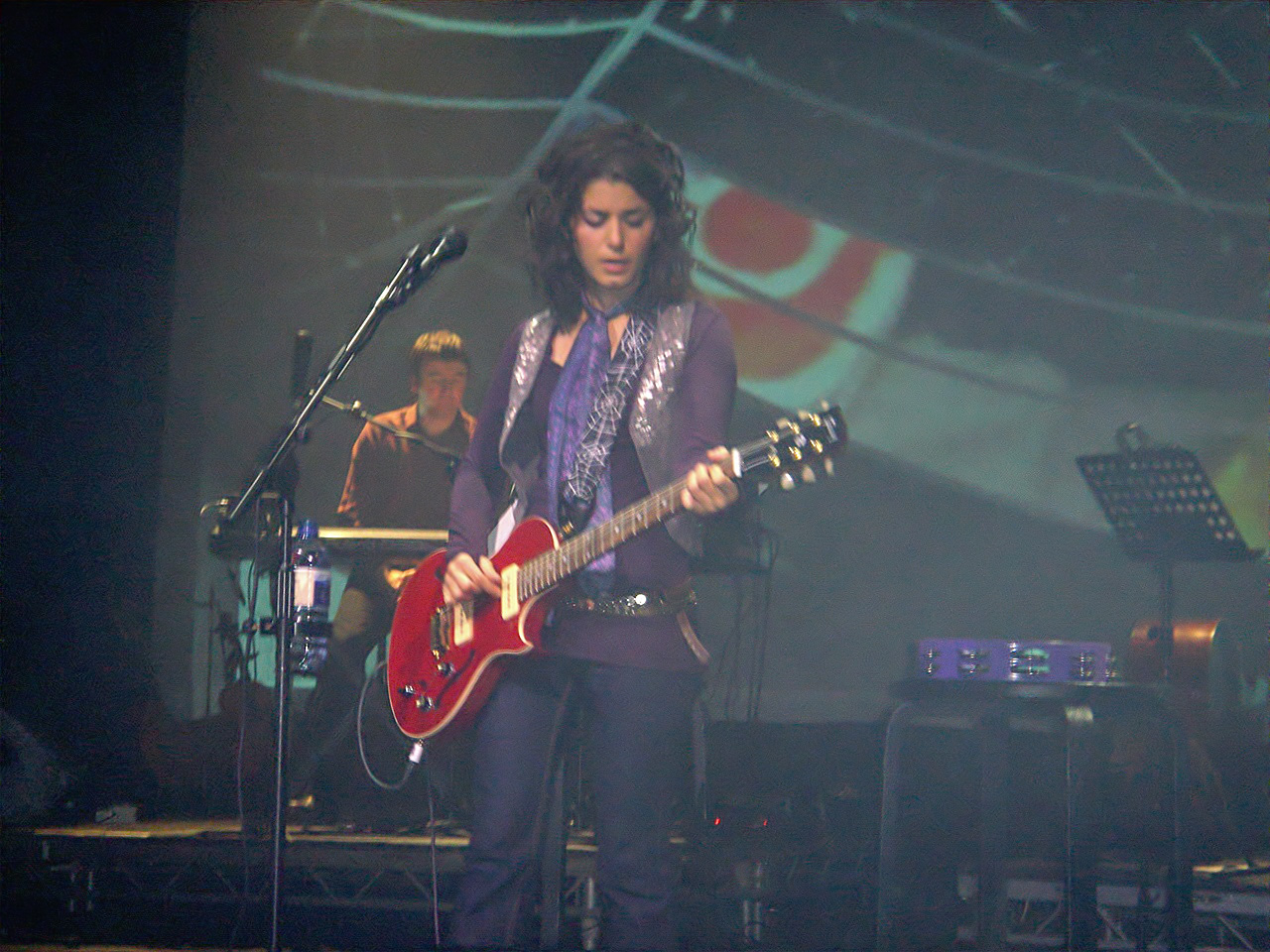
Melua at Cambridge Corn Exchange, part of her 2006 UK concert tour

Melua's third album, Pictures, was released in the UK on 1 October 2007 and was announced to be, at least temporarily, the last of her albums in collaboration with Mike Batt as lead writer and producer. It also features Melua's friend Molly McQueen, the former frontwoman of The Faders, as co-writer of "Perfect Circle". Melua also collaborated with Andrea McEwan on the album, who wrote the lyrics for "What I Miss About You" and "Dirty Dice". The album also featured a cover of "In My Secret Life" by Leonard Cohen and Sharon Robinson. Melua said of the cover, "[It] completely got to me, about how we all have great ideals but in reality we end up conforming, following everyone else."

Melua released four singles from the album: "If You Were a Sailboat", "Mary Pickford", "If the Lights Go Out", and "Ghost Town". "Mary Pickford", written by Mike Batt, was about the silent film star of the same name and the formation of United Artists along with Charlie Chaplin, D W Griffith and Douglas Fairbanks . "Ghost Town" was Melua's first reggae-sounding song.

The iTunes version of the album includes a cover of the Prince song "Under the Cherry Moon" as a bonus track.

=== The House (2010) ===
Melua's fourth album, The House, was released on 24 May 2010. Songwriters include Lauren Christy, Guy Chambers and Rick Nowels, with William Orbit producing. Three singles anticipated the release: the first one was "The Flood", released on 17 May 2010. The second one, "A Happy Place", was released in July of the same year: the third and last single "To Kill You With A Kiss" (I'd Love To Kill You on the album) was released at the end of November.

=== Secret Symphony (2012) ===
Melua's fifth studio album, Secret Symphony was released on 5 March 2012 and also debuted high in the UK album chart. The album was produced, arranged and conducted by Mike Batt. Melua said in a statement: "This album was going to be my 'singer's album'. I had always wanted to do this one day; singing other people's songs brings something out of you and your voice that isn't perhaps where you would have gone vocally with your own material."

=== Ketevan (2013) ===
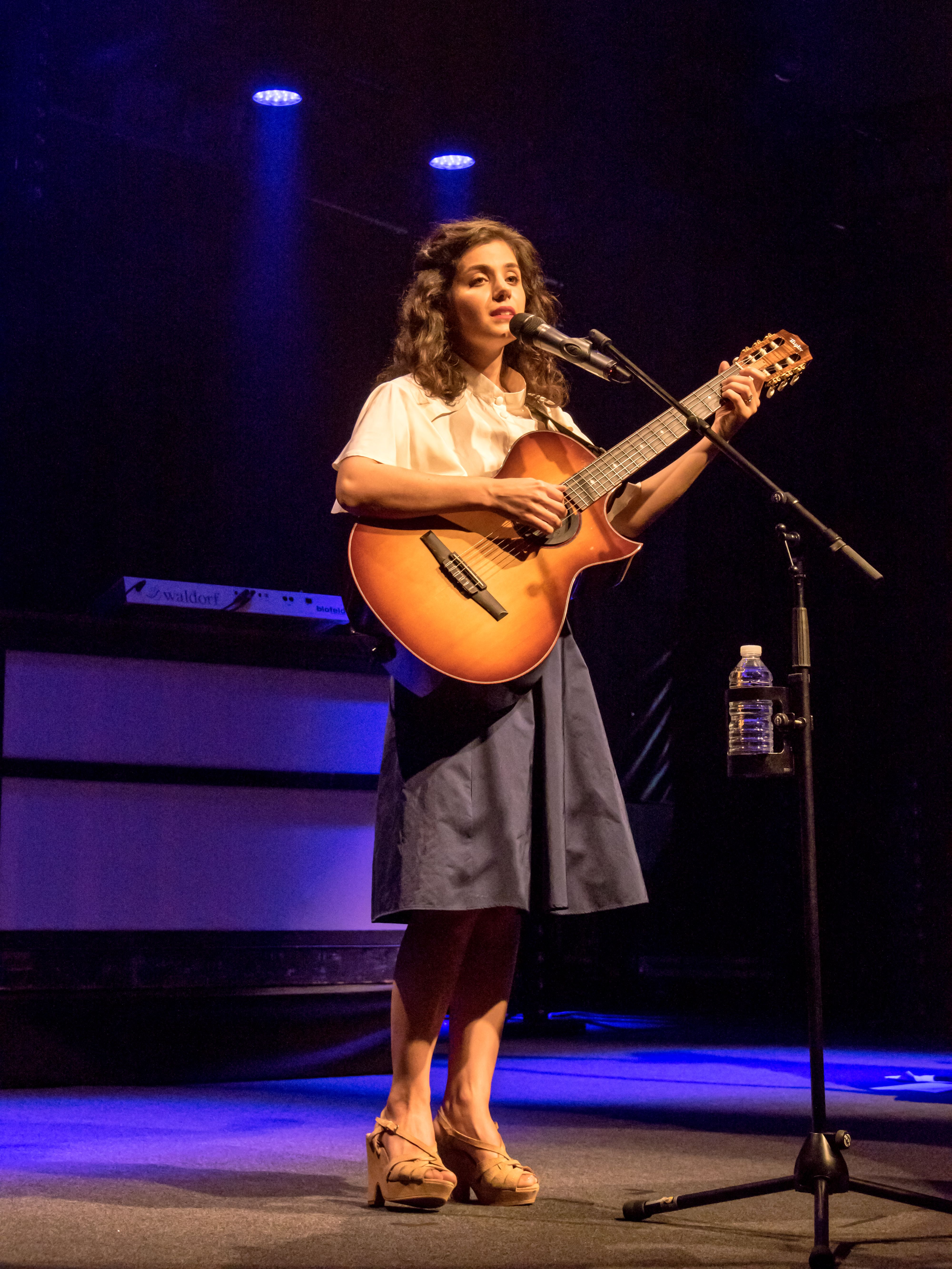
Zelt-Musik-Festival 2016 in Freiburg, Germany

Melua's sixth studio album, Ketevan, was released on 16 September 2013. It was co-produced by Mike Batt and his son, singer-songwriter Luke Batt, both of whom contributed songs, separately and in collaboration with Melua. Melua debuted a full orchestral version of the first single, "I Will Be There", during the Coronation anniversary gala for Queen Elizabeth II at Buckingham Palace in July 2013. Described as a "tender and heart-warming ballad which is underpinned by Melua’s beautifully compassionate vibrato and an orchestral arrangement that builds majestically", the song was composed by Mike Batt.

Ketevan entered the UK charts at number 6, and with this accomplishment, Melua joined a very small group of female artists, which includes Madonna and Kate Bush, who have scored six consecutive UK top 10 studio albums. Ketevan also entered the top 10 in France, Poland, Denmark, Germany, the Netherlands and Switzerland in its first week of release.

=== Wonderful Life (2014) ===
Melua recorded a cover of Black's "Wonderful Life" in 2014 for the BBC Radio 2's Sounds of the 80s compilation album. The song was produced by Luke Batt, whom she also worked with for the Ketevan album the year before.

On 25 August 2015, the cover was released as a charity single on BMG, in aid of Great Ormond Street Hospital and Sheffield Children's Hospital. The release coincided with an advertisement campaign for Premier Inn featuring Melua's cover, which launched on ITV on 30 August. The song reached number 73 on the UK singles chart.

=== In Winter (2016) ===
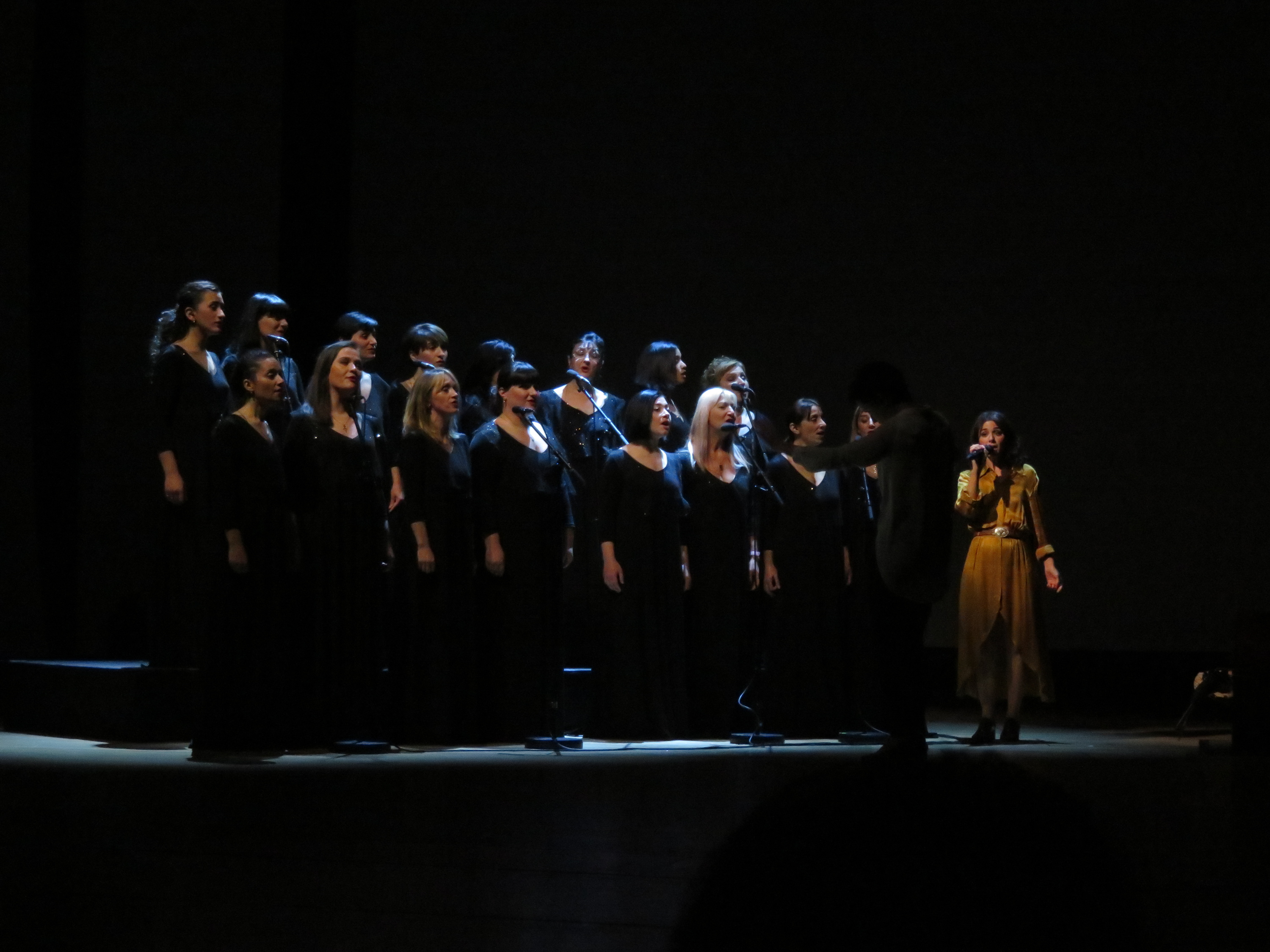
Melua with the Gori Women's Choir, 2018

Melua's seventh album, In Winter, was released on 14 October 2016. For this record, Melua went back to her native Georgia to record an album with the Gori Women's Choir, a native Georgian all-woman singing troupe. Melua revealed during an interview with The Guardian that her partnership with Mike Batt had come to an end after her last album, as it was a six-album deal with Batt's Dramatico records.

In 2017, she released a cover version of "Fields of Gold", the official song for Children in Need.

=== Album No. 8 (2020) & Aerial Objects (2022) ===
In June 2020, Melua supported the Georgian Red Cross Society in their efforts to assist the vulnerable population in Georgia during the COVID-19 pandemic by performing a live charity concert featuring songs that were requested by her followers on her social media accounts. Melua released her eighth studio album, Album No. 8, on 16 October 2020. The lead single off the album, "A Love like That", which was produced by Leo Abrahams, received its first airplay on 30 June 2020 on BBC Radio 2. The video for the song features British actor Billy Howle and was directed by Charlie Lightening, who has directed videos for the likes of Paul McCartney, Jamiroquai and Liam Gallagher. The second single, "Airtime" premiered on 24 July 2020. The video for 'Airtime', which again featured actor Billy Howle and was also directed by Charlie Lightning, was shot around Herne Bay over two days and was filmed according to COVID-19 lockdown guidelines.

In the summer of 2022, Melua revealed a new collaborative album with Grammy award-winning sound engineer Simon Goff, Aerial Objects. The album was released via BMG on CD and digital formats on 15 July 2022. Goff said of the album: "The process of making this album has been one of discovery and giving space to each other. The sensitivity needed for this kind of process has allowed many things to surface, from us discovering the differences in how we listen to and hear music and lyrics, to our own deeply personal life experiences. The record for me is a representation of us exploring the space that exists between us and discovering a common voice from within it." Melua also embarked on a 10 date concert tour in 2022, during which she announced her first pregnancy via Instagram.

=== Love & Money (2023) ===
In January 2023, Melua announced that her new album Love & Money would be released via BMG on 24 March 2023. Leo Abrahams, who worked with Melua on her 2020 record, Album No. 8, returned to produce the record. Love & Money was recorded at Peter Gabriel's Real World Studios in the summer of 2022 when Melua was pregnant with her first child.

Melua embarked on a 27 date spring tour throughout Europe and the UK, titled the Love & Money Tour, including a headline performance at the Royal Albert Hall. The first single and video from the record "Golden Record" debuted on 12 January 2023. Melua has said of the song: "Writing Golden Record, it was like I was finally making peace with it all, accepting how things have changed in the industry, being happy with my lot at home and ready to face the fear of letting go of the forever funfair of the music industry." Other singles released from the album included "Those Sweet Days" and "Quiet Moves".

In September 2023, Melua released a re-recorded version of the album track "14 Windows", which served as a charity single for the Royal Medical Benevolent Fund. The track is dedicated to the memory of her psychiatrist, who treated her during her 2010 mental breakdown and committed suicide in 2022. Melua said, "This song is a dedication to a doctor who saved my life. He gave me back a quality of life which I'll be forever grateful for by helping me through a severe mental health crisis. I was off all my medication after two years of being under his care. And when I heard last year that he took his own life I was floored."

Melua recorded the English-language track, "End of Summer", for the soundtrack to the Polish film The Peasants with Polish rapper and producer L.U.C and international collective Rebel Babel Film Orchestra. The track features additional production from Geoff Foster and debuted on 25 January 2024 on various streaming services. In March 2024, Melua performed at the 35th anniversary of Byron Bay Bluesfest in Byron Bay, Australia. Melua also subsequently performed in Sydney and Melbourne. These musical performances had marked Melua's first Australian shows in 19 years.

== Other work ==
=== Acting and modelling ===
Melua appeared in a segment of the 2007 film Grindhouse, written by Quentin Tarantino and Robert Rodriguez. The segment in which Melua appeared, entitled "Don't", was a faux trailer, directed by Edgar Wright and produced in the style of a 1970s' Hammer House of Horror film trailer.

In 2009, Melua was named as the new face of the leading French cashmere designer, Éric Bompard.

=== World record holder ===
On 2 October 2006, Melua entered the Guinness Book of Records for playing the deepest underwater concert 303 metres below sea level on the Norwegian Statoil's Troll A platform in the North Sea. Melua and her band underwent extensive medical tests and survival training in Norway before flying by helicopter to the rig.

Melua later described achieving the record as "the most surreal gig I have ever done". Melua's concert is commemorated in the DVD release Concert Under the Sea, released in June 2007.

=== Charity work ===
In November 2004 Melua was asked to take part in Band Aid 20 in which she joined a chorus of British and Irish pop singers to create a rendition of "Do They Know It's Christmas?" to raise money for famine relief in Africa. Then in March 2005, Melua sang "Too Much Love Will Kill You" with Brian May at the 46664 concert in George, South Africa for Nelson Mandela's HIV charity. Melua had been a fan of Queen since her childhood in Georgia when her uncles played the band's music, so performing with May was a realisation of a childhood dream. Later in 2005, through her role as a goodwill ambassador to the charity Save the Children, Melua went to Sri Lanka where she observed the work the charity was doing for children in the area after the civil war and Indian Ocean tsunami. In 2006 Melua donated all the proceeds from her single "Spider's Web" to the charity.

On 7 July 2007, Melua performed at the German leg of Live Earth in Hamburg and in December of that year, Melua released a cover of the Louis Armstrong song "What a Wonderful World" in which she sang with a recording of the late Eva Cassidy. All profits from the single, which entered the UK singles chart at No. 1 on 16 December 2007, went to the Red Cross.

Melua has visited Oxfam charity shops for many years, using them frequently to buy her clothing. She has stated that this is related as much to her dislike of spending and glamour as it is to her support for the charity, and admits that she looks "like a tramp" and that her hairdresser playfully calls her look "the Romanian window cleaner".

Melua is a patron of Fair Trees, the organisation that is trying to stop exploitation of cone pickers in Ambrolauri, Georgia, by the European Christmas tree industry. The local people in this region of Georgia are paid a pittance to risk their lives climbing 30 m high fir trees to collect the cones from which the seeds are extracted and sent to Christmas tree nurseries in Europe. Until Fair Trees came along these cone pickers were given no safety equipment or training, no health insurance and very little pay; every year people are injured and even killed doing this work. Fair Trees grow and sell the only fair trade Christmas trees in the world (certified by the WFTO).

Melua is a patron of the Manx Cancer Help charity, which offers support to cancer sufferers and is based on the Isle of Man. She attended the 2013 fundraising ball for the charity.

Melua released a re-recorded version of her Love & Money album track "14 Windows" in support of the Royal Medical Benevolent Fund, which offers support to doctors, medical students and their families with vital services in times of hardship. All of the proceeds from the single go towards the work of the charity.

=== Musical influences ===
Melua has stated that the rock band Queen were a huge influence on her as a child/teenager, with one of her memories of music being her uncle playing records by Queen and Led Zeppelin. She performed with Queen at the 46664 concert in South Africa in March 2005.

Melua appeared on the BBC's The Culture Show in November 2006 advocating Paul McCartney as her choice in the search for Britain's greatest living icon.

== Discography ==
=== Studio albums ===
- Call Off the Search (2003)
- Piece by Piece (2005)
- Pictures (2007)
- The House (2010)
- Secret Symphony (2012)
- Ketevan (2013)
- In Winter (2016)
- Album No. 8 (2020)
- Love & Money (2023)

=== Collaborative albums ===
- Aerial Objects with Simon Goff (2022)

=== Appearances on soundtracks ===
Year	Film	Song
2005	Just Like Heaven	"Just Like Heaven"
2006	Mía Sarah	"Call Off the Search", "Tiger in the Night"
2006	Miss Potter	"When You Taught Me How to Dance"
2007	Nancy Drew	"Looking for Clues"
2009	Faintheart	"Toy Collection"
2010	The Tourist	"No Fear of Heights"
2011	5 Days of War	"No Fear of Heights"
2023	The Peasants	"End of Summer"

=== Acting roles ===
Year	Film	Role
2007	Grindhouse	Murder Victim's Friend (segment "Don't")

== Honours and awards ==
Year	Ceremony	Category	Result
2005	EBBA Awards	European Border Breaker Award	
2005	ECHO Award	Best International Newcomer	Won
2006	ECHO Award	Best International Female Artist	Nominated
2006	BRIT Awards	Best Pop Act	Nominated
2006	BRIT Awards	Best British Female Solo Artist	Nominated
2007	Goldene Kamera	Pop International Solo	Won
2007	ECHO Award	Best International Female Artist	Won

- Melua was the best-selling UK female artist of 2004 and 2005.
- In 2006, Melua had a tulip named after her.
- According to VH1, Call Off the Search is the 87th best-selling British album in history.
- Asteroid 25131 was named Katiemelua.
