= Dramatico =

Dramatico is a record label founded by Mike Batt in 2000. Artists on the label include Mike Batt, Robert Meadmore, Sarah Blasko, Katie Melua, Leddra Chapman and Alistair Griffin. Dramatico has also established a publishing company in New York City and Germany.

Artists signed to Dramatico Publishing include Reyna Larson, FL Jones, and The Paper Scissors.

== See also ==
- Lists of record labels
