= Shy Boy (Katie Melua song) =

Single by Katie Melua

from the album Piece by Piece
- Released: 20 November 2006
- Genre: Jazz/Blues
- Length: 3:29
- Label: Dramatico
- Songwriter: Mike Batt
- Producer: Mike Batt

Katie Melua singles chronology
"It's Only Pain" (2006)	"Shy Boy" (2006)	"If You Were a Sailboat" (2007)

"Shy Boy" is the eighth single by Georgian-born singer Katie Melua and the fifth from her second album, Piece by Piece (2005).

In the UK the single was released as download-only single, whereas in some European countries there was a physical CD release. The song was then released in Poland, where Melua's preceding singles "Spider's Web" and "It's Only Pain" reached the top five on the airplay chart, and Piece by Piece lead single "Nine Million Bicycles" topped the chart.

After 3 weeks on charting below the Top 20, the single finally peaked at #1 in Polish National Top 50, making "Shy Boy" her second number one single in Poland.

== Track listings ==
1. "Shy Boy"
2. "Fancy" (live)
3. "Have Yourself a Merry Little Christmas"

== Charts ==
Weekly chart performance for "Shy Boy"
Chart (2006–07)	Peak position
Netherlands (Dutch Top 40)	16
Netherlands (Single Top 100)	29

Year-end chart rankings for "Shy Boy"
Chart	Position
Netherlands (Dutch Top 40, 2006)	180
Netherlands (Dutch Top 40, 2007)	269
