= Steenhuis =

Steenhuis is a surname. Notable people with the surname include:

- Guusje Steenhuis (born 1992), Dutch judoka
- Mark Steenhuis (born 1980), Canadian professional lacrosse player
- Wout Steenhuis (1923–1985), Dutch multi-instrumentalist
