= Pepe (song) =

Shirley Jones song

Single by Shirley Jones

from the album Pepe
- B-side: "Lovely Day"
- Released: December 1960
- Recorded: 1960
- Genre: Pop, Easy Listening
- Length: 1:53
- Label: Colpix Records
- Songwriters: Hans Wittstatt, Dory Previn
- Producer: George Sidney

Shirley Jones singles chronology
"Clover in the Meadow" (1957)	"Pepe" (1960)	"I've Still Got My Heart Joe" (1971)

"Pepe" is a 1960 song written by Hans Wittstatt and Dory Previn for the musical comedy film Pepe, featuring Mario Moreno ("Cantinflas") in the lead role. It was first recorded by Shirley Jones for the movie. Duane Eddy covered the song the same year. There have also been several other cover versions of this song.

== Shirley Jones version ==
The song was originally performed in the movie by Shirley Jones. It was released as a single in 1960 on Colpix Records CP 15013. Jones' recording reached No. 4 in Spain.

== Duane Eddy version ==
"Pepe"

Single by Duane Eddy

from the album $1,000,000.00 Worth of Twang, Volume 2
- B-side: "Lost Friend"
- Released: December 1960
- Genre: Rockabilly
- Length: 2:11
- Label: Jamie Records
- Songwriters: Hans Wittstatt, Dory Previn

Duane Eddy singles chronology
"Kommotion" (1960)	"Pepe" (1960)	"Theme from Dixie" (1961)

Duane Eddy covered the song in 1960 on Jamie Records 1175. His version charted at number 18 on the Billboard Hot 100. However, it was a much bigger hit in the United Kingdom, where it peaked at Number 2 in January 1961.

=== Charts ===
Chart (1961)	Peak position
Belgium (Ultratop 50 Flanders)	6
Belgium (Ultratop 50 Wallonia)	6
Canada (CHUM Chart)	17
New Zealand (Lever Hit Parade)	5
Netherlands (Single Top 100)	14
UK Singles (OCC)	2
US Billboard Hot 100	18
West Germany (GfK)	3

== Other versions ==
- Dalida covered it in French as "Pépé". It appeared on her 1961 album "Garde-moi la dernière danse" and one single from same year. It reached number 3 on the German chart, and number 10 on the Dutch chart.
- Jorgen Ingmann took a cover to number 6 in 1961 on the Norwegian Singles Chart.
- In the UK, pianist Russ Conway took his cover version to number 19 in the British charts during January 1961.
- Bert Weedon covered it in his 1976 compilation album 22 Golden Guitar Greats, which made him the first solo guitar player to top the UK Album Chart.
