= 22 Golden Guitar Greats =

Compilation album by Bert Weedon
- Released: 1976
- Genres: Pop, rock, folk
- Labels: Warwick; WW5019
- Producers: Brian Matthew, Chris Harding

22 Golden Guitar Greats is a compilation album by guitarist Bert Weedon released in 1976 on the Warwick label. It reached number one in the UK Albums Chart in November 1976 making Weedon the first solo guitarist to have a number-one album. The album received both a gold disc and platinum disc for sales.

== Track listing ==
No.	Title	Writer(s)	Length
1.	"Dance On!"	Valerie Murtagh, Elaine Murtagh, Ray Adams
2.	"Wipe Out"	Bob Berryhill, Pat Connolly, Jim Fuller, Ron Wilson
3.	"Wheels"	Richard Stephens, Jimmy Torres, Norman Petty
4.	"Diamonds"	Jerry Lordan
5.	"Forty Miles of Bad Road"	Duane Eddy
6.	"Yakety Axe"	Chet Atkins
7.	"Kon Tiki"	Michael Carr
8.	"Ginchy"	Bert Weedon
9.	"Pepe"	Hans Wittstatt and D. Langdon
10.	"Sleep Walk"	Santo Farina and Johnny Farina
11.	"Guitar Boogie Shuffle"	Arthur "Guitar Boogie" Smith
12.	"Walk, Don't Run"	Johnny Smith
13.	"Scarlett O'Hara"	Jerry Lordan
14.	"F.B.I."	Peter Gormley
15.	"Sorry Robbie"	Bert Weedon
16.	"Maria Elena"	Lorenzo Barcelata
17.	"Shazam!"	Duane Eddy
18.	"Perfidia"	Alberto Domínguez
19.	"Man of Mystery"	Michael Carr
20.	"Hava Nagila"	Traditional
21.	"Albatross"	Peter Green
22.	"Apache"	Jerry Lordan
