= Warwick Records =

Warwick Records is the name of:

- An American record label, Warwick Records (United States)
- A British record label, Warwick Records (United Kingdom)
