= F.B.I. (instrumental) =

1961 single by the Shadows

Single by The Shadows
- B-side: "Midnight"
- Released: 3 February 1961
- Recorded: 13 September 1960
- Studio: EMI Studios, London
- Genre: Instrumental rock
- Length: 2:18
- Label: Columbia
- Composers: Hank Marvin; Bruce Welch; Jet Harris
- Producer: Norrie Paramor

The Shadows singles chronology
"Man of Mystery" / "The Stranger" (1960)	"F.B.I." (1961)	"The Frightened City" (1961)

"F.B.I." is an instrumental rock tune recorded by the British group the Shadows and released as a single in February 1961. It spent 19 weeks in the UK Singles Chart reaching number 6 in mid-February and mid-March 1961.

== Release and reception ==
"F.B.I." was written by the Shadows' Hank Marvin, Bruce Welch and Jet Harris, but due to complicated publishing contracts it was credited to their manager Peter Gormley. The actual composers' names never appeared on the credits. It was released as a single by EMI on the Columbia label, with the B-side "Midnight", written by Marvin and Welch. It was released in the United States and Canada in July 1961 on Atlantic Records with "The Frightened City", written by Norrie Paramor, as the B-side.

Reviewing for Disc, Don Nicholl described "F.B.I." as "a quick moving melody that may not quite live up to the implications of the title – but which is a very contagious thing all the same". He also wrote the "Midnight" "seems pretty obviously to have been inspired (consciously or not) by "Sleep Walker". The same sliding electric guitar technique is used for a similarly lazy melody".

== Track listing ==
7": Columbia / DB 4580

1. "F.B.I." – 2:18
2. "Midnight" – 2:30

7": Atlantic / 2111 (US and Canada)

1. "FBI" – 1:52
2. "The Frightened City" – 2:21

== Musicians ==
- Hank Marvin – lead guitar
- Bruce Welch – rhythm guitar
- Jet Harris – bass guitar
- Tony Meehan – drums and percussion

== Charts ==
Chart (1961)	Peak position
Australia (Kent Music Report)	60
Belgium (Ultratop 50 Flanders)	18
Belgium (Ultratop 50 Wallonia)	16
France	3
Netherlands (Single Top 100)	18
New Zealand (Lever Hit Parade)	3
UK Singles (OCC)	6

== Covers ==
- A cover version of "F.B.I." with "Wheels" as the B-side (cat. WB 436) was released in February 1961 on the UK Embassy Records budget label – sold exclusively in Woolworths stores. It was credited to "Bud Ashton" (a generic pseudonym used to represent whatever session musician had actually made the recording).
- English guitarist Bert Weedon covered the song on his 1976 compilation album 22 Golden Guitar Greats.
- Queen guitarist Brian May covered "F.B.I." with Francis Rossi and Rick Parfitt of Status Quo on the 1996 tribute album Twang!: A Tribute to Hank Marvin & the Shadows, and it later appeared as the B-side of his 1998 single "Why Don't We Try Again".
- Experimental rock group Massacre recorded a cover of "F.B.I." in 1981, which was released on their 2005 reissue of Killing Time.
- Ian Hunter and his band, featuring the guitarist Mick Ronson, covered "F.B.I." on the double live disc Welcome to the Club.
- The solo in Australian alternative rock group TISM's 1995 single "Greg! The Stop Sign!!" is a variation on the intro riff.
- Jethro Tull's "From a Deadbeat To an Old Greaser", a cut from the album Too Old to Rock 'n' Roll: Too Young to Die!, contained the line "When bombs were banned every Sunday and the Shadows did F.B.I."
