= Piece by Piece (Katie Melua album) =

Studio album by Katie Melua
- Released: 26 September 2005
- Studio: Ewshot Hall
- Genres: Jazz; pop; blues
- Length: 44:32
- Label: Dramatico
- Producer: Mike Batt

Katie Melua chronology
Call Off the Search (2003)	Piece by Piece (2005)	Pictures (2007)

Singles from Piece by Piece
- 1. "Nine Million Bicycles" Released: 19 September 2005; 2. "I Cried for You" Released: 2005; 3. "Spider's Web" Released: 17 April 2006; 4. "It's Only Pain" Released: 11 September 2006; 5. "Shy Boy" Released: 20 November 2006

Piece by Piece is the second studio album by British singer Katie Melua. It was released on 26 September 2005 by Dramatico Records. The album combines original material written by Melua and her longtime collaborator Mike Batt with several cover versions, featuring four songs by each writer and one co-written composition.

The album received mixed-to-positive reviews from critics, who praised Melua's voice, emotional delivery, and the album’s melancholy atmosphere, while some criticised its safe adult-contemporary approach and polished production. It was a major commercial breakthrough, reaching number one in the United Kingdom, Denmark, the Netherlands, Norway, and Poland, while peaking within the top five in several other European markets. The album earned multiple platinum certifications, including 4× Platinum in both the UK and Germany, and sold over three million copies across Europe.

== Background ==
Melua wrote the title song "Piece By Piece" after she broke up with her boyfriend Luke Pritchard, and "Half Way up the Hindu Kush" was written by Katie and Mike Batt playing on the unusualness of the title phrase, which cropped up in a conversation about scarves on a train journey. Alongside covers of "Blues in the Night" and Canned Heat's "On the Road Again", the album includes "Thank you, Stars", which was previously released as a B-side on Melua's debut single "The Closest Thing To Crazy" in 2003.

== Promotion ==
The album's lead single, "Nine Million Bicycles", written by Mike Batt, became Melua's first top-five hit in the UK. The song attracted attention following criticism from science writer Simon Singh, who argued that its lyrics reflected misunderstandings of cosmology and the scientific method. A good-natured public exchange followed, culminating in Melua recording an alternative version of the song incorporating scientifically accurate lyrics proposed by Singh.

The second single was a double A-side consisting of "I Cried for You" and a cover of The Cure's "Just Like Heaven". "I Cried for You" was inspired by Melua's meeting with the authors of The Holy Blood and the Holy Grail and explores the relationship between Jesus and Mary Magdalene, while "Just Like Heaven" was recorded for the soundtrack of the film Just Like Heaven (2005). The single peaked outside the UK top twenty. A third single, "Spider's Web," which Melua wrote at the age of eighteen during the Iraq War, failed to reach the UK top forty.

== Critical reception ==
Professional ratings
Review scores
Source	Rating
AllMusic	3/5 stars
Entertainment Weekly	B+
The Guardian	3/5 stars
The Independent	3/5 stars
Now	2/5 Ns
RTÉ	4/5 stars
Rolling Stone	2/5 stars
USA Today	3.5/4 stars
Yahoo! Music UK	7/10

Caroline Sullivan from The Guardian highlighted Piece by Piece for its departure from teenage pop norms, praising its "forlorn twang" and the "pleasantly melancholy" title track that blends "vocal technique and unfeigned wistfulness," though she also implied a restrained, MOR-leaning aesthetic. Dan Gennoe from Yahoo! Music UK characterised Piece by Piece as "practically an album of "The Closest Thing to Crazy" sound-alikes," observing its "sweetly melancholic easy listening" that "tugs so gracefully at the heart strings," while warning that its safer direction "smothers" some of Melua's original charm, despite standout moments such as "I Cried for You" and the title track, which are singled out as "beautifully desolate laments." Elysa Gardner of USA Today praised Melua's simplicity, restraint, and clear soprano, highlighting tracks such as "Nine Million Bicycles," "Blues in the Night," and "Spider's Web" as evidence of her vocal and songwriting strengths.

Entertainment Weekly's Clark Collis gave the record a B+ and framed Melua as a UK counterpart to Norah Jones, pointing out that while it lacks a song "as obviously delightful" as "The Closest Thing to Crazy," her performance remains "beguilingly soulful and flirtatious." Rolling Stone focused on the contrast between Melua's "distinct, seductive voice" and the material, calling much of it "mostly dull jazz- and blues-tinged," while criticising "Nine Million Bicycles" as "precious, lightweight adult-pop" and a cover of "On the Road Again" that "falls flat." Writing for Now, Bryan Borzykowski described Piece by Piece as a sophomore album of "smoky jazz numbers and a few upbeat blues tracks," suggesting it follows the same adult contemporary style as her debut, but is "not nearly as developed" as comparable works in the genre, and criticising the "unbearably cheesy" "Nine Million Bicycles" alongside a "misguided" cover of "On the Road Again." RTÉ editor Harry Guerin called Piece by Piece "slick and polished," noting that its "cuddly production" and orchestral pop sheen give it "grudging respect" for being "done well and memorably," despite criticism that its more ambitious material lacks presence and that Melua's voice was "wholesome, not wanton."

== Commercial performance ==
Piece by Piece marked Melua's international commercial breakthrough and significantly expanded on the success of her debut album, Call Off the Search (2003). The album reached number one on the UK Albums Chart, opening with 120,459 copies sold in its first week. It also topped the UK Independent Albums Chart, and achieved further chart-topping positions in Denmark, the Netherlands, Norway, Poland, and Scotland, while reaching the top five in several other major markets including Germany, Austria, Belgium, Ireland, and Switzerland. In the United States, it reached number 108 on the Billboard 200 but performed more strongly in genre-specific rankings, peaking at number two on the Heatseekers Albums chart and number three on the Top Jazz Albums chart.

The record sustained strong international chart performance over multiple years, appearing prominently on numerous year-end charts in 2005 and 2006, including a top-three placement in the Netherlands and a peak of number two in Germany for 2006. Commercially, the album was a major European success, earning multi-platinum certifications in several territories, including quadruple platinum status in both Germany (over one million copies sold) and the United Kingdom (over 1.2 million copies sold). It also achieved multi-platinum certification in France, the Netherlands, Ireland, Denmark, and Norway, and contributed to International Federation of the Phonographic Industry (IFPI) recognition of over three million units sold across Europe.

== Track listing ==
Piece by Piece track listing
No.	Title	Writer(s)	Length
1.	"Shy Boy"	Mike Batt	3:22
2.	"Nine Million Bicycles"	Batt	3:15
3.	"Piece by Piece"	Katie Melua	3:24
4.	"Halfway Up the Hindu Kush"	Melua; Batt	3:06
5.	"Blues in the Night"	Harold Arlen; Johnny Mercer	4:12
6.	"Spider's Web"	Melua	3:58
7.	"Blue Shoes"	Batt	4:39
8.	"On the Road Again"	Floyd Jones; Alan Wilson	4:38
9.	"Thank You, Stars"	Batt	3:39
10.	"Just Like Heaven"	Robert Smith; Porl Thompson; Simon Gallup; Lol Tolhurst; Boris Williams	3:35
11.	"I Cried for You"	Melua	3:38
12.	"I Do Believe in Love"	Melua	3:00

Special bonus edition – bonus tracks
No.	Title	Writer(s)	Length
13.	"It's Only Pain"	Batt	3:13
14.	"Lucy in the Sky with Diamonds" (acoustic version)	Lennon–McCartney	3:07
15.	"Sometimes When I'm Dreaming"	Batt	3:39

El Corte Inglés edition – bonus tracks
No.	Title	Writer(s)	Length
13.	"Esa Clase de Locura"	Batt	4:14
14.	"Otra Vez Tú"	Melua	3:13

US edition – bonus tracks
No.	Title	Writer(s)	Length
13.	"Jack's Room"	Melua; Batt	3:17
14.	"Market Day on Guernica"	Batt	4:02

== Personnel ==
Performers and musicians

- Katie Melua – vocals
- Katie Melua, Chris Spedding, Jim Cregan – guitar
- Mike Batt (Katie Melua on "I Do Believe in Love") – piano
- Tim Harries – bass
- Henry Spinetti – drums
- Dominic Glover – trumpet
- Mike Darcy – violin
- Martin Ditcham, Chris Karan – percussion
- Paul Jones – harmonica ("Blues in the Night")
- Adrian Brett – ethnic flute ("Nine Million Bicycles")
- Peter Knight – mandolin ("Thankyou, Stars")
- Craig Pruess – sitar ("Halfway up the Hindu Kush")
- The Irish Film Orchestra – orchestra; conductor: Mike Batt

Technical

- Mike Batt – arranger, production
- Steve Sale – engineer
- Simon Fowler – photography

== Charts ==
=== Weekly charts ===
Weekly chart performance for Piece by Piece
Chart (2005–06)	Peak position
Australian Albums (ARIA)	31
Austrian Albums (Ö3 Austria)	5
Belgian Albums (Ultratop Flanders)	4
Belgian Albums (Ultratop Wallonia)	9
Danish Albums (Hitlisten)	1
Dutch Albums (Album Top 100)	1
European Albums (Billboard)	2
Finnish Albums (Suomen virallinen lista)	23
French Albums (SNEP)	9
German Albums (Offizielle Top 100)	2
Hungarian Albums (MAHASZ)	33
Irish Albums (IRMA)	2
Italian Albums (FIMI)	17
New Zealand Albums (RMNZ)	16
Norwegian Albums (VG-lista)	1
Polish Albums (ZPAV)	1
Portuguese Albums (AFP)	16
Scottish Albums (Official Charts)	1
South African Albums (RISA)	5
Swedish Albums (Sverigetopplistan)	6
Swiss Albums (Schweizer Hitparade)	3
UK Albums (Official Charts)	1
UK Independent Albums (Official Charts)	1
US Billboard 200	108
US Heatseekers Albums (Billboard)	2
US Top Jazz Albums (Billboard)	3

=== Year-end charts ===
2005 year-end chart performance for Piece by Piece
Chart (2005)	Position
Belgian Albums (Ultratop Flanders)	76
Dutch Albums (Album Top 100)	1
European Albums (Billboard)	23
French Albums (SNEP)	134
German Albums (Offizielle Top 100)	56
Irish Albums (IRMA)	19
Swedish Albums (Sverigetopplistan)	76
Swiss Albums (Schweizer Hitparade)	91
UK Albums (OCC)	11

2006 year-end chart performance for Piece by Piece
Chart (2006)	Position
Austrian Albums (Ö3 Austria)	18
Belgian Albums (Ultratop Flanders)	30
Belgian Albums (Ultratop Wallonia)	38
Dutch Albums (Album Top 100)	3
European Albums (Billboard)	3
French Albums (SNEP)	41
German Albums (Offizielle Top 100)	2
South African Albums (RISA)	6
Swedish Albums (Sverigetopplistan)	70
Swiss Albums (Schweizer Hitparade)	7
UK Albums (OCC)	55

2007 year-end chart performance for Piece by Piece
Chart (2007)	Position
Dutch Albums (Album Top 100)	41
German Albums (Offizielle Top 100)	13
Swiss Albums (Schweizer Hitparade)	62

=== Decade-end charts ===
Chart (2000–09)	Position
UK Albums (OCC)	86

== Certifications and sales ==
Certifications for Piece by Piece
Region	Certification	Certified units/sales
Austria (IFPI Austria)	Platinum	30,000^{*}
Belgium (BRMA)	Platinum	50,000^{*}
Canada (Music Canada)	Gold	50,000^{^}
Denmark (IFPI Danmark)	4× Platinum	160,000^{^}
France (SNEP)	3× Platinum	300,000^{‡}
Germany (BVMI)	4× Platinum	1,000,000
Ireland (IRMA)	4× Platinum	60,000^{^}
Netherlands (NVPI)	2× Platinum	400,000
New Zealand (RMNZ)	Gold	7,500^{^}
Norway (IFPI Norway)	Platinum	175,000
Poland (ZPAV)	2× Platinum	40,000^{*}
Sweden (GLF)	Platinum	60,000^{^}
Switzerland (IFPI Switzerland)	3× Platinum	120,000^{^}
United Kingdom (BPI)	4× Platinum	1,200,000^{^}
United States	—	58,000
Summaries
Europe (IFPI)	3× Platinum	3,000,000^{*}
^{*} Sales figures based on certification alone.^{^} Shipments figures based on certification alone.^{‡} Sales+streaming figures based on certification alone.

== See also ==
- List of best-selling albums of the 2000s (decade) in the United Kingdom
