= Call Off the Search =

Call off the Search

Studio album by Katie Melua
- Released: 3 November 2003
- Genres: Jazz; blues
- Length: 41:14
- Label: Dramatico
- Producer: Mike Batt

Katie Melua chronology
Call off the Search (2003)	Piece by Piece (2005)

Singles from Call off the Search
- 1. "The Closest Thing to Crazy" Released: 1 December 2003; 2. "Call off the Search" Released: 15 March 2004; 3. "Crawling up a Hill" Released: 19 July 2004

Call off the Search is the debut studio album by British singer Katie Melua. It was released by Dramatico on 3 November 2003. The album was developed after Melua was signed by musician Mike Batt following a performance at a Brit School showcase in early 2003. Recording sessions followed shortly after, with Batt producing and contributing much of the material alongside songs by John Mayall, Delores J. Silver, Randy Newman, and James Shelton, as well as two tracks written by Melua herself.

The album received generally positive reviews from music critics, who praised Melua's vocal performance, maturity, and atmospheric delivery, while some noted the production as restrained or overly polished. It was a major commercial success, reaching number one in the United Kingdom and Denmark and peaking within the top ten in several countries including Ireland, Norway, New Zealand, the Netherlands, and Germany. It earned multiple platinum certifications, including 6× Platinum in the UK and 2× Platinum by International Federation of the Phonographic Industry (IFPI) for approximately 2 million European sales.

== Background ==
After completing her GCSEs, Katie Melua attended the BRIT School for the Performing Arts in the London Borough of Croydon, where she studied a BTEC with A-level music and began writing songs. While performing at a school showcase in early 2003, she was discovered by musician Mike Batt, who had been seeking a young artist capable of "performing jazz and blues in an interesting way." Impressed by her performance of "Faraway Voice," a song written in tribute to Eva Cassidy, Batt signed the 18-year-old to his Dramatico label and management company and soon brought her into the studio to begin recording her debut album. Batt produced the sessions and contributed material alongside songs by John Mayall, Delores J. Silver, Randy Newman, and James Shelton, while Melua also contributed her own songwriting, including "Faraway Voice" and "Belfast (Penguins and Cats)," the latter reflecting her upbringing in Belfast, Northern Ireland and referencing Protestants as "Penguins" and Catholics as "Cats."

== Promotion ==
The album was promoted through three singles: "The Closest Thing to Crazy," "Call Off the Search," and "Crawling up a Hill." Lead single "The Closest Thing to Crazy" was released in 2003 and became the most commercially successful, reaching the top ten in the United Kingdom and Ireland and charting in several other territories. The title track "Call Off the Search," released in 2004, achieved moderate chart success, including a top 30 position in the UK, while third single "Crawling Up a Hill," a cover of English blues and rock musician John Mayall, released on 18 July, saw more limited performance, charting lower in the UK and select European markets.

== Critical reception ==
Professional ratings
Review scores
Source	Rating
AllMusic	3.5/5 stars
Now	3/5 Ns
RTÉ	4/5 stars
Slant	3/5 stars

Slant Magazine's Sal Cinquemani described the album as an instantly attention-grabbing debut, noting her voice was "cupie-doll croon, part seasoned pro" with "dramatic yet fresh and precocious" phrasing, while praising standout tracks like "Blame It on the Moon" and "Lilac Wine" and suggesting she has "huge potential" as a future artist. Mark Fielding from musicOMH called Call Off the Search the "finest debut release" with a "voice that carries this album," noting her "maturity far far beyond her young age" and calling it a "light jazz" record whose instrumentation is "subtle and delicate," with standout tracks like "The Closest Thing to Crazy" and "Crawling Up a Hill."

Now editor Jason Richards felt that Melua's debut was an ideal restaurant-ambience album, praising its "crisp swingin' instrumentation with delicate strings" and calling it a "lazy, hypnotic affair," despite noting her "young voice smacks of inexperience." RTÉ critic Linda McGee described Call Off the Search as a "moving and evocative" debut with a "deep sultry voice" that evokes a "dimly lit blues club," praising her "vocal musicality" and control over "brash orchestral accompaniment" while calling her a promising "future star." Writing for AllMusic, Johnny Loftus found that the album was a "comfortable, lightly melodic affair" that "drinks red wine safely in the middle of the road," placing her "pristinely in between pop, adult contemporary, and traditional American musical forms." He noted her "velvety" voice and "beguiling accent," calling the album a "promising debut" despite some "easy street" detours.

== Chart performance ==
Call Off the Search achieved widespread commercial success across multiple international markets. In the United Kingdom, the album peaked at number one on the UK Albums Chart, and became the fifth best-selling album of 2004 with 1,356,962 copies sold. By January 20113, it had sold over 1.9 million copies domestically. Elsewhere, it reached number one in Denmark, number two in Ireland and Norway, number four in New Zealand, number six in the Netherlands, and number eight in Germany. Call Off the Search also entered the US Billboard 200, peaking at number 161, and reached number seven on the US Heatseekers Albums chart.

It received extensive certifications worldwide based on high shipment and sales figures, including 6× Platinum in the United Kingdom (1.9 million copies sold), 2× Platinum in Germany (400,000 copies sold), 2× Platinum in Denmark (80,000 copies sold), Platinum in Australia (70,000 copies sold), the Netherlands (80,000 copies sold), New Zealand (15,000 copies sold), Switzerland (40,000 copies sold), Sweden (30,000 copies sold), and South Africa (50,000 copies sold). In Norway, it was certified 3× Platinum, representing 145,000 copies sold, while across Europe it was certified 2× Platinum by International Federation of the Phonographic Industry (IFPI), corresponding to approximately 2 million copies sold.

== Track listing ==
Call Off the Search track listing
No.	Title	Writer(s)	Length
1.	"Call Off the Search"	Mike Batt	3:24
2.	"Crawling Up a Hill"	John Mayall	3:25
3.	"The Closest Thing to Crazy"	Batt	4:12
4.	"My Aphrodisiac Is You"	Batt	3:34
5.	"Learnin' the Blues"	Delores J. Silver	3:23
6.	"Blame It on the Moon"	Batt	3:47
7.	"Belfast (Penguins and Cats)"	Katie Melua	3:21
8.	"I Think It's Going to Rain Today"	Randy Newman	2:30
9.	"Mockingbird Song"	Batt	3:06
10.	"Tiger in the Night"	Batt	3:07
11.	"Faraway Voice"	Melua	3:13
12.	"Lilac Wine"	James Shelton	4:11
Total length:			41:14

Bonus tracks
No.	Title	Writer(s)	Length
13.	"Downstairs to the Sun"	Melua	3:34
14.	"Deep Purple"	Peter DeRose; Mitchell Parish	3:48

== Personnel ==
- Katie Melua – guitar, vocals
- Mike Batt – organ, piano, conducting, arrangements, production
- Jim Cregan – guitar
- Tim Harries – bass
- The Irish Film Orchestra – orchestra
- Michael Kruk – drums
- Alan Smale – leader
- Chris Spedding – guitar
- Henry Spinetti – drums

Technical

- Steve Sale – engineering
- Simon Fowler – photography
- Michael Halsband – cover photo

== Charts ==
=== Weekly charts ===
Weekly chart performance for Call Off the Search
Chart (2003–04)	Peak position
Australian Albums (ARIA)	13
Belgian Albums (Ultratop Flanders)	76
Belgian Albums (Ultratop Wallonia)	76
Danish Albums (Hitlisten)	1
Dutch Albums (Album Top 100)	6
French Albums (SNEP)	41
German Albums (Offizielle Top 100)	8
Irish Albums (IRMA)	2
Japanese Albums (Oricon)	13
New Zealand Albums (RMNZ)	4
Norwegian Albums (VG-lista)	2
Polish Albums (OLiS)	19
Portuguese Albums (AFP)	17
Swedish Albums (Sverigetopplistan)	22
Swiss Albums (Schweizer Hitparade)	29
UK Albums (Official Charts)	1
US Billboard 200	161
US Heatseekers Albums (Billboard)	7

=== Year-end charts ===
2003 year-end chart performance for Call Off the Search
Chart (2003)	Position
UK Albums (OCC)	110

2004 year-end chart performance for Call Off the Search
Chart (2004)	Position
Australian Albums (ARIA)	60
Dutch Albums (Album Top 100)	26
German Albums (Offizielle Top 100)	21
New Zealand Albums (RMNZ)	35
UK Albums (OCC)	5

2005 year-end chart performance for Call Off the Search
Chart (2005)	Position
Dutch Albums (Album Top 100)	37
German Albums (Offizielle Top 100)	40
UK Albums (OCC)	94

=== Decade-end charts ===
Chart (2000–09)	Position
UK Albums (OCC)	34

== Certifications ==
Certifications for Call Off the Search
Region	Certification	Certified units/sales
Australia (ARIA)	Platinum	70,000^{^}
Denmark (IFPI Danmark)	2× Platinum	80,000^{^}
France	—	100,000
Germany (BVMI)	2× Platinum	400,000^{^}
Netherlands (NVPI)	Platinum	80,000^{^}
New Zealand (RMNZ)	Platinum	15,000^{^}
Norway (IFPI Norway)	3× Platinum	145,000
South Africa (RISA)	Platinum	50,000^{*}
Sweden (GLF)	Gold	30,000^{^}
Switzerland (IFPI Switzerland)	Platinum	40,000^{^}
United Kingdom (BPI)	6× Platinum	1,900,000
United States	—	66,000
Summaries
Europe (IFPI)	2× Platinum	2,000,000^{*}
^{*} Sales figures based on certification alone.^{^} Shipments figures based on certification alone.

== See also ==
- List of best-selling albums of the 2000s (decade) in the United Kingdom
