= Nine Million Bicycles =

2005 single by Katie Melua

Single by Katie Melua

from the album Piece by Piece
- B-side: "Market Day in Guernica", "Stardust"
- Released: 19 September 2005
- Length: 3:15
- Label: Dramatico
- Songwriter: Mike Batt
- Producer: Mike Batt

Katie Melua singles chronology
"Crawling Up a Hill" (2004)	"Nine Million Bicycles" (2005)	"I Cried for You" / "Just like Heaven" (2005)

"Nine Million Bicycles" is a song written and produced by Mike Batt for British singer Katie Melua's second album, Piece by Piece. It was released as the album's first single in September 2005 and reached number five on the UK Singles Chart, becoming Melua's first top-five hit as a solo artist. It was a finalist for The Record of the Year prize, losing to "You Raise Me Up" by Westlife.

== Background ==
According to Melua, the inspiration for the song came during a visit to Beijing with her manager Mike Batt. Their interpreter showed them around the city and told them that there are supposedly nine million bicycles in the city. Batt wrote a song based around the title "Nine Million Bicycles" after returning to England two weeks later, and it was one of the last songs to be recorded for Piece by Piece. Adrian Brett, who played the ethnic flutes on Batt's album Caravans (1978), contributed to the song; an ocarina was used for the low sounds, and a Chinese bamboo flute for the high sounds.

Melua said that she liked the song "because it is a simple juxtaposition of a trivial idea ('Nine Million Bicycles') against an important idea ('I will love you till I die')". The website indieLondon named it one of the "highlights" of Piece by Piece, describing it as "genuinely sweet ... The meandering blasts of flute that weave their way throughout lend the song a Chinese feel and make it quite enticing".

== Music video ==
The single's music video, directed by Kevin Godley, shows Melua lying on the grass during a picnic in a park with her friends, before being dragged across the floor through a variety of settings, including a brief shot of the Summer Palace in Beijing, until she returns to the park at the end of the video.

== Alternative version ==
In 2005, Melua was criticised by writer and scientist Simon Singh for inaccurate lyrics referring to the size of the observable universe ("We are 12 billion light-years from the edge. That's a guess — no one can ever say it's true"). Melua and Singh met, and Melua re-recorded a tongue-in-cheek version of the song for BBC Radio 4's Today program that had been written by Singh:

"We are 13.7 billion light-years from the edge of the observable universe; that's a good estimate with well-defined error bars/and with the available information, I predict that I will always be with you".

Melua later said that she 'should have known better' as she used to be a member of the Astronomy club at school.

== Track listing ==
1. "Nine Million Bicycles" (Mike Batt) – 3:15
2. "Market Day in Guernica" (Batt) – 4:02
3. "Stardust" (Hoagy Carmichael, Mitchell Parish) – 4:10

== Personnel ==
- Katie Melua – vocals, guitar
- Dominic Glover – trumpet
- Adrian Brett – flute
- Mike Batt – piano
- Jim Cregan – guitar
- Chris Spedding – guitar
- Mike Darcy – violin
- Tim Harries – bass guitar
- Henry Spinetti – drums
- Martin Ditchman – percussion
- Chris Karan – percussion
- The Irish Film Orchestra

Production

- Mike Batt – producer, arranged
- Steve Sale – engineer

== Charts ==
=== Weekly charts ===
Weekly chart performance for "Nine Million Bicycles"
Chart (2005–2006)	Peak position
Belgium (Ultratop 50 Flanders)	4
Canada AC (Billboard)	21
Europe (Eurochart Hot 100)	19
France (SNEP)	56
Germany (GfK)	31
Ireland (IRMA)	11
Italy (FIMI)	17
Netherlands (Dutch Top 40)	2
Netherlands (Single Top 100)	2
Norway (VG-lista)	10
Scottish Singles Sales (Official Charts)	5
Switzerland (Schweizer Hitparade)	43
UK Singles (Official Charts)	5
UK Indie (Official Charts)	2

=== Year-end charts ===
2005 year-end chart performance for "Nine Million Bicycles"
Chart (2005)	Position
Netherlands (Dutch Top 40)	17
Netherlands (Single Top 100)	11
UK Singles (OCC)	63

2006 year-end chart performance for "Nine Million Bicycles"
Chart (2006)	Position
Belgium (Ultratop 50 Flanders)	42
Netherlands (Dutch Top 40)	76
Netherlands (Single Top 100)	91

== Certifications ==
Certifications for "Nine Million Bicycles"
Region	Certification	Certified units/sales
Denmark (IFPI Danmark)	Gold	4,000^{^}
United Kingdom (BPI)	Silver	200,000^{‡}
^{^} Shipments figures based on certification alone.^{‡} Sales+streaming figures based on certification alone.
