= Maton =

Australian musical instrument manufacturer

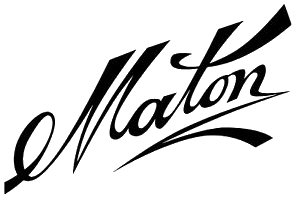

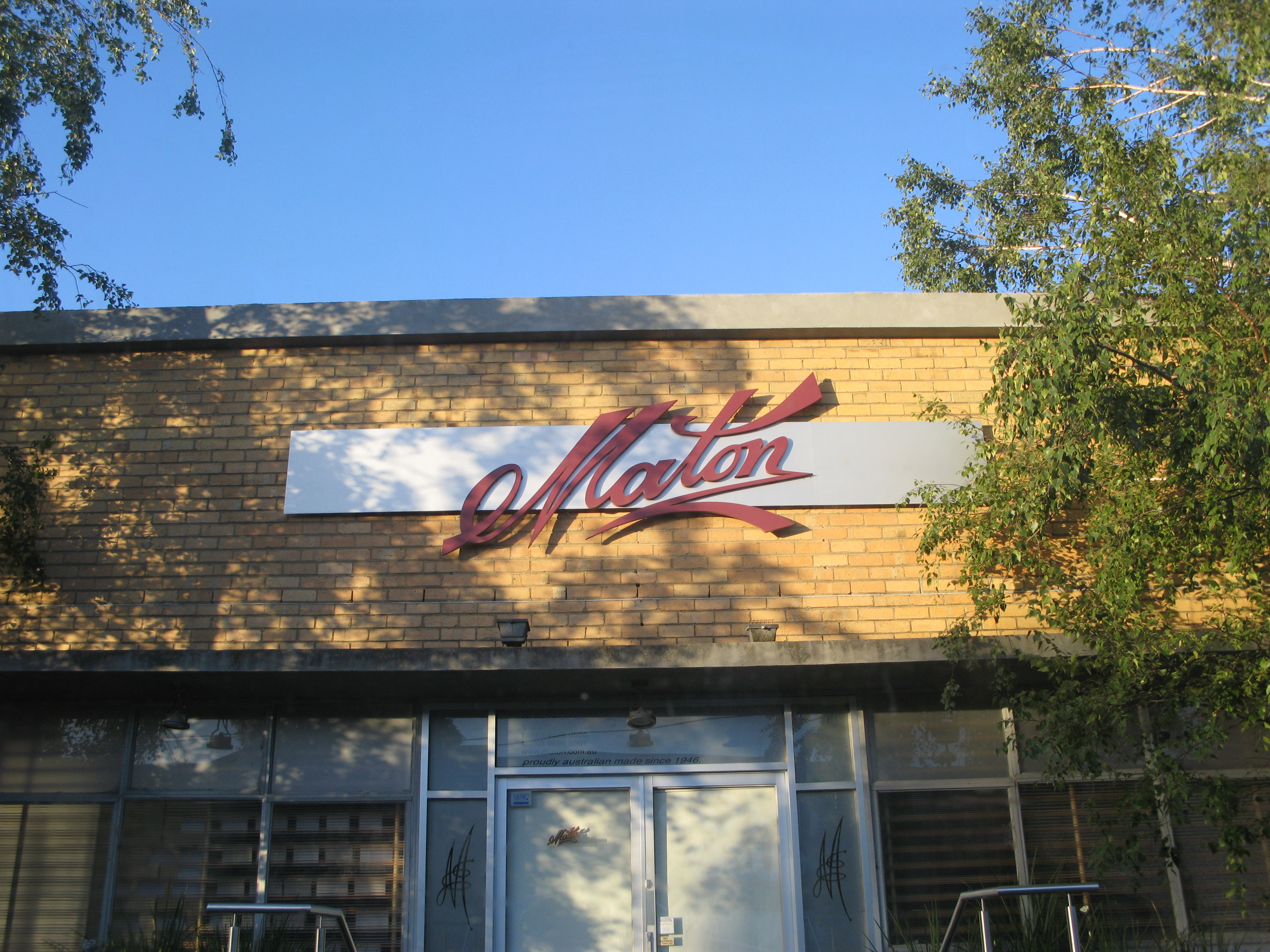
- Entrance to the Maton Guitar factory, 2010
- Company type: Private
- Industry: Musical instruments
- Founded: 1946; 80 years ago
- Founder: Bill and Reg May
- Headquarters: Box Hill, Melbourne, Australia
- Area served: Worldwide
- Products: Electric and acoustic guitars, ukuleles, guitar pickups
- Website: maton.com.au

Maton is an Australian musical instruments manufacturing company based in Box Hill, Melbourne. It was founded in 1946 by Bill May and his brother Reg. The name "Maton" came from the words "May Tone" and is pronounced May Tonne.

Products currently manufactured by Maton include acoustic guitars and guitar pickups.

== History ==
The company was founded in 1946 as the "Maton Musical Instruments Company" by Bill May and his brother Reg. Reg was a wood machinist, while Bill was a jazz musician, woodwork teacher and luthier who had for some years operated a custom guitar building and repair business under the name Maton Stringed Instruments and Repairs.

At first the company produced high-quality acoustic instruments for students and working professionals, aiming at providing good value for money and experimenting with the use of Australian woods. In the 1960s they expanded into electric instruments and instrument amplifiers, at first under the name Magnetone. The early catalogues noted that the warranties on amplifiers and loudspeakers were void if used in situations of "overload or distortion", reflecting May's jazz background but essential to modern electric guitarists of any style.

Maton established itself early on the Australian rock scene in the late 1950s, assisted by Australia's tariff regime, which made imported guitars far more expensive than the local equivalents. Maton guitars were used by many well-known Australian pop and rock groups including Col Joye & The Joy Boys. The company also made one of the first sponsorship deals in Australian rock, supplying Melbourne band The Strangers with a full set of the distinctive 'El Toro' model guitars and basses (notable for their outlandish 'horned' body shape) while the group was working as the house band on the TV pop show The Go!! Show in the mid-Sixties.

Maton earned international renown for their superb acoustic and electric guitars and basses, which have been played by scores of famous performers from The Easybeats to The Wiggles. George Harrison owned one of their MS500 models, which were introduced in 1957 and famed British session guitarist Big Jim Sullivan owned and used a Maton 'Cello' guitar for many years during the peak of his career, playing it on recordings with Sarah Vaughan, Sammy Davis Jr., Johnny Keating and his Big Band. Neil Finn from Crowded House is often seen playing Maton guitars.

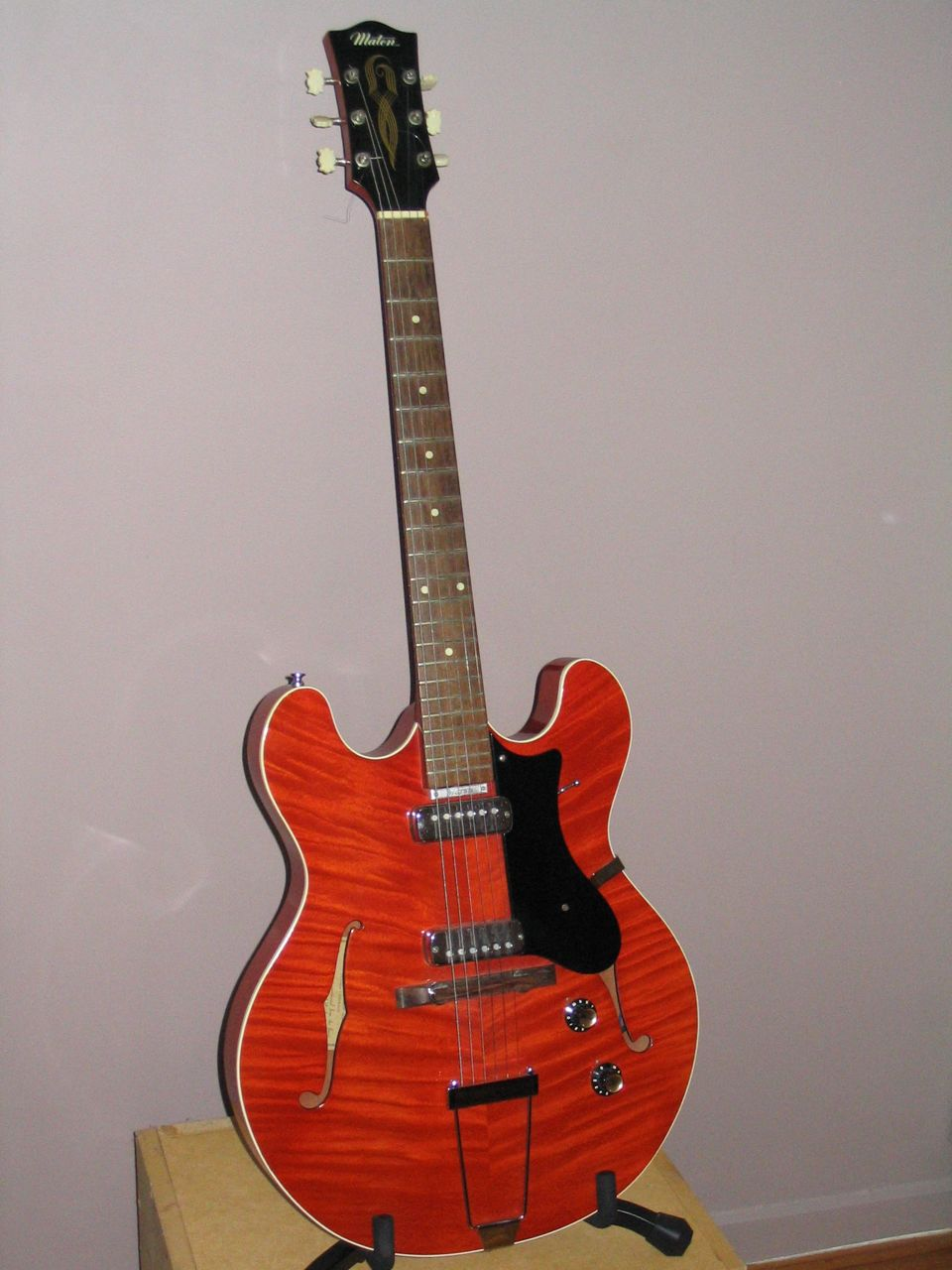
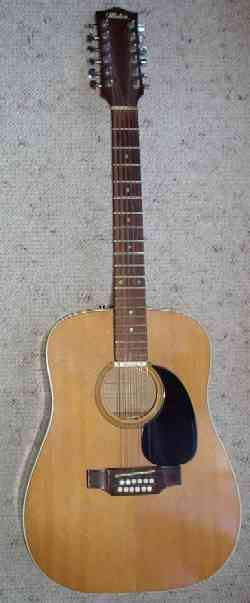
Electric 6-string and acoustic 12-string guitars

Australian singer Frank Ifield also owned and used a Maton guitar, which he later had fitted with a custom-made scratch plate, made in the shape of a map of Australia. Frank gave this instrument to his guitarist Ray Brett when he returned to Australia, and it has been featured on an episode of the BBC programme Antiques Roadshow. Although these guitars are now normally worth around £2,000, expert Bunny Campione valued Ifield's guitar at between £10,000 and £15,000, because Ifield had used it in songs featured in a compilation album alongside The Beatles' first two singles.

Easybeats lead guitarist Harry Vanda is probably the best-known Maton player of the Sixties, and his famous red Maton Sapphire semi-acoustic 12-string (which he donated to the Powerhouse Museum in Sydney in 1999) was an integral part of the Easybeats' sound throughout their career, and features prominently on hit singles like "I'll Make You Happy".

Australian guitarist, Tommy Emmanuel, owns many Matons and almost exclusively uses the BG808 acoustic model on his latest albums. Maton has even constructed a Tommy Emmanuel "TE series" according to Tommy's specifications. His understudy Kieran Murphy also uses Matons. Joe Robinson plays Maton guitars and was the company's featured performer at the Frankfurt Musikmesse in 2009.

Ben Harper and Jack Johnson use Matons. Renowned guitar instructor Justin Sandercoe uses Maton acoustic guitars. Australian singer-songwriter Vance Joy regularly uses the Maton guitar The Maton Heritage ECW80

== Custom Shop ==
Established in 2008, the Maton Custom Shop produced over 1,000 guitars, all hand made by master luthier Andy Allen until he left the company in 2024. Andy is now selling guitars under his own name. It is not clear whether further Maton Custom Shop guitars will be made.

== Products ==
Current products manufactured by Maton include steel-string acoustic guitars and guitar pickups. Maton no longer makes electric guitars. The last electric model from Maton was the BB1200-JH a signature guitar of Josh Homme. Some of the current acoustic models include:

- Mini Maton: Maton's small body acoustic guitar. It uses Maton's AP5 pickup system.
- Maton EBG808TE: The TE series guitars are designed in conjunction with guitar virtuoso Tommy Emmanuel. Other models in the TE series are EBG808TEC, TE1 and the TE Personal.
- Maton SRS70C: A hollow body single cut acoustic guitar with a tortoiseshell pickguard and a rosewood neck. The SRS70C comes in both 6 and 12 string form.
- The Performer: A slim bodied 808 size guitar designed for on-stage use.
- ER90: Originally made for the US market this is the only regular model available with the popular combination of a spruce top with rosewood back and sides. Available in traditional (808) or dreadnought size.

== See also ==
- List of acoustic guitar brands
- List of electric guitar brands
- Manufacturing in Australia
