= Twang! =

Compilation album
- Released: 1996
- Label: Pangǽa Records

Twang!: A Tribute to Hank Marvin & The Shadows is a tribute CD released in 1996 on Pangǽa Records. The collection features mostly guitar players performing songs popularised by The Shadows, which featured their lead guitar player Hank Marvin. The Shadows were largely a British phenomenon, so most of the artists on the collections are British or from Commonwealth countries.

The liner notes were written by Pete Townshend. The album concept was by Miles Copeland.

== Track listing ==
1. Apache by Ritchie Blackmore
2. FBI by Brian May
3. Wonderful Land by Tony Iommi
4. The Savage by Steve Stevens
5. The Rise and Fall of Flingel Bunt by Hank Marvin
6. Midnight by Peter Green and the Splinter Group
7. Spring is Nearly Here by Neil Young and Randy Bachman
8. Atlantis by Mark Knopfler
9. The Frightened City (theme from the film The Frightened City) by Peter Frampton
10. Dance On by Keith Urban
11. Stingray by Andy Summers
12. The Stranger by Bela Fleck and the Flecktones
