= Call Off the Search (song) =

2004 single by Katie Melua

Single by Katie Melua

from the album Call Off the Search
- Released: 15 March 2004
- Length: 3:22
- Label: Dramatico
- Songwriter(s): Mike Batt
- Producer(s): Mike Batt

Katie Melua singles chronology
"The Closest Thing to Crazy" (2003)	"Call Off the Search" (2004)	"Crawling Up a Hill" (2004)

"Call Off the Search" is the second single of Georgian-born singer Katie Melua. It is the title song of her debut album, Call Off the Search. The single had two versions that both came out on the same day. The B-side of the second version, "Turn to Tell", was composed by Melua's guitar teacher, Justin Sandercoe. The song peaked at number 19 on the UK Singles Chart and number 27 in Ireland.

== Track listings ==
Version one

1. "Call Off the Search" (Mike Batt)
2. "Shirt of a Ghost" (Katie Melua)
3. "Deep Purple" (Mitchell Parish / Peter De Rose)

Version two

1. "Call Off the Search" (Mike Batt)
2. "Turn to Tell" (Justin Sandercoe)

== Personnel ==
- Katie Melua – guitar, vocals
- Mike Batt – organ, piano, conductor, production, arrangement
- Jim Cregan – guitar
- Tim Harries – bass
- Irish Film Orchestra – orchestra
- Michael Kruk – drums
- Alan Smale – leader
- Chris Spedding – guitar you
- Henry Spinetti – drums
- Justin Sandercoe – production
- Steve Sale – engineering

== Charts ==
Chart (2004)	Peak position
Ireland (IRMA)	27
Scotland (OCC)	20
UK Singles (OCC)	19
UK Indie (OCC)	2
