= The Frightened City (song) =

1961 single by the Shadows

Single by The Shadows
- B-side: "Back Home"
- Released: 28 April 1961
- Recorded: 18 February 1961
- Studio: EMI Studios, London
- Genre: Instrumental rock
- Length: 2:22
- Label: Columbia
- Composer(s): Norrie Paramor
- Producer(s): Norrie Paramor

The Shadows singles chronology
"F.B.I." (1961)	"The Frightened City" (1961)	"Kon-Tiki" (1961)

"The Frightened City" is a song by British group the Shadows, released as a single in April 1961. It peaked at number 3 on the UK Singles Chart.

== Background and release ==
"The Frightened City" was composed by Norrie Paramor as title music to the gangster film The Frightened City, and it was performed by a studio orchestra. Prior to the film's release, the Shadows recorded and released their own version of the tune in April 1961. It was released with the B-side "Back Home", written by Jim Goff, Hank Marvin, Bruce Welch and Jet Harris. "The Frightened City" was the group's second recording of a film tune, having released a version of "Man of Mystery" in November 1960.

Reviewing for Disc, Don Nicholl wrote that "The Frightened City" "has the sort of steady dark drama in it which fits their kind of music perfectly". He also wrote that "Back Home" "has the Latin in it. Gently tuneful and away from the conventional Shadows sound here and there".

== Track listing ==
7": Columbia / DB 4637

1. "The Frightened City" – 2:22
2. "Back Home" – 2:41

== Personnel ==
- Hank Marvin – electric lead guitar
- Bruce Welch – acoustic rhythm guitar
- Jet Harris – electric bass guitar
- Tony Meehan – drums

== Charts ==
Chart (1961)	Peak position
Belgium (Ultratop 50 Wallonia)	35
Ireland (Evening Herald)	7
New Zealand (Lever Hit Parade)	7
South Africa (South African & Lourenço Marques Radio)	6
UK Singles (OCC)	3

== Cover versions ==
- In 1965, Norrie Paramor and His Orchestra covered the song on his album Shadows in America.
- In 1996, Peter Frampton covered the song on the various artists tribute album Twang!: A Tribute to Hank Marvin & the Shadows.
