= Man of Mystery =

1960 single by the Shadows

Single by The Shadows
- B-side: "The Stranger"
- Released: 4 November 1960
- Recorded: 7 October 1960
- Studio: EMI Studios, London
- Genre: Instrumental rock
- Length: 1:58
- Label: Columbia
- Composer: Michael Carr
- Producer: Norrie Paramor

The Shadows singles chronology
| "Apache" (1960) | "Man of Mystery" (1960) | "F.B.I." (1961) |

"Man of Mystery" is an instrumental rock piece by the Shadows, released as a single in November 1960. It peaked at number 5 on the UK Singles Chart.

== Background and release ==
"Man of Mystery" was written by Michael Carr for the theme tune for the film series Edgar Wallace Mysteries, based on the books by Edgar Wallace. For the first three series, "Man of Mystery" was a "slow and haunting arrangement featuring flute, accordion and string section". However, from the fourth series, an up-tempo beat version featuring an electric guitar and percussion was used.

The Shadows recorded their version of "Man of Mystery" in October 1960 and it was released as a double A-sided single with "The Stranger" in November. "Man of Mystery" was released in the US and Canada by Atlantic Records in February 1962, with the flip side "Kon Tiki", which had been released as a single in the UK in September 1961.

Reviewing for Disc, Don Nicholl wrote of "Man of Mystery" that the "melody is forceful without being complicated. The instrumentalists play it with inbuilt excitement that ought to have jukes rattling everywhere". He also described "The Stranger" as "another fairly solid instrumental with a theme that's rather reminiscent of some western tunes which have gone before".

== Track listing ==
7": Columbia / DB 4530

1. "Man of Mystery" – 1:58
2. "The Stranger" – 2:37

7": Atlantic / 2135 (US and Canada, 1962)

1. "Man of Mystery" – 2:00
2. "Kon Tiki" – 1:55

== Charts ==
"Man of Mystery"

| Chart (1960–61) | Peak position |
|---|---|
| Netherlands (Single Top 100) | 14 |
| UK Singles (Official Charts) | 5 |

"The Stranger"

| Chart (1961) | Peak position |
|---|---|
| Australia (Kent Music Report) | 88 |

== Cover versions ==
- In 1961, American musician Chet Atkins released a cover of the song as a single.
- In 1965, American guitarist Al Caiola covered the song on his album Sounds for Spies and Private Eyes.
- In 1976, English guitarist Bert Weedon covered the song on his compilation album 22 Golden Guitar Greats.
- In 1981, English producer Nigel Wright, as Mojo, sampled the song on his Shadows medley single "Dance On", which peaked at number 70 on the UK Singles Chart.
- In 1994, Danish singer Tommy Seebach, as Seebach Band, covered the song on his album Instrumental Megahits 1.
- In 2007, Muse released a cover of the song for the CD included with the 13 June edition of NME magazine. The edition was to promote their Wembley Stadium concerts the same week. The song was recorded remotely using their laptops whilst working overnight on their tour bus.
- In 2016, French guitarist Noël Akchoté covered the song on his album Shot Gun – Plays the Shadows.
- In 2024, French Gypsy Jazz group Basilic Swing covered this song on its album Caravane.
- In 2026, French underground punk and electro-rock project Sandie Trash sampled the opening of the song for their single Poupée Panik (feat. Eric Débris & Richard Belgium) .
