= It's Only Pain =

Single by Katie Melua

from the album Piece by Piece
- Released: September 11, 2006
- Genre: Jazz/Blues
- Length: 3:16
- Label: Dramatico
- Songwriter: Mike Batt
- Producer: Mike Batt

Katie Melua singles chronology
"Spider's Web" (2006)	"It's Only Pain" (2006)	"Shy Boy" (2006)

"It's Only Pain" is the seventh single by Georgian-born singer-songwriter Katie Melua and the fourth from her second album, Piece by Piece. The song had been thought to be about her pain at breaking-up with her boyfriend, Luke Pritchard. This is not true. The song was written in New York by Mike Batt as a single for her but with no reference to Melua's own life events.

== Music video ==
In the music video, (directed by Melua's producer and songwriter Mike Batt and shot in the old Alexandra Palace Theatre before its refurbishment), shows Melua walking forward slowly into the disused auditorium. She sits on a wooden chair in front of the stage and observes a version of herself dressed as a doll-like vaudeville/dance character. The character's hair is sticking out at odd angles and her make-up is eccentric, complete with a teardrop. She wears a shabby red dance costume. As the "doll" character sings to the real Melua, a ghostly dancer appears and starts to dance around behind her. The ghost is that of Giselle, the ballet character, played by Georgian ballerina Elena Glurdjidze, who wears the traditional Giselle character costume while sadly dancing choreography drawn from the Giselle ballet.

Occasionally we see a glimpse of the prince from Giselle lying motionless, stage left. The ghost dancer goes over to the prince. Reaching her hands down to him, he and she come back to life and the pair dance gracefully, while the sad shabby dancer can only skip awkwardly.

The Katie in the auditorium has been watching this with empathy. Near the end of the video, the stage Melua comes down off the stage, and steps forward to embrace the audience Melua. But the "real" Katie vanishes during the embrace, so that the doll character ends up almost hugging herself. The camera then tilts down to her fidgeting black-nailed fingers, and the video ends.

== Track listings ==
1. "It's Only Pain" (Mike Batt)
2. "Lucy in the Sky with Diamonds" (John Lennon, Paul McCartney)
3. "It's Only Pain" (acoustic version)

== Recorded ==
- It's Only Pain was recorded when Melua was in New York City.
- Lucy in the Sky with Diamonds was recorded at Abbey Road Studio 2 during a BBC Radio 2 tribute to John Lennon.

== Charts ==
Chart (2006)	Peak Position
Netherlands (Single Top 100)	39
Norway (VG-lista)	15
UK Singles (OCC)	41
UK Indie (OCC)	6
