= Crawling Up a Hill =

1964 single by John Mayall & the Bluesbreakers

Single by John Mayall & the Bluesbreakers
- B-side: "Mr. James"
- Released: May 1964
- Length: 2:15
- Label: Decca
- Songwriter(s): John Mayall

John Mayall & the Bluesbreakers singles chronology
| "Crawling Up a Hill" (1964) | "Crocodile Walk" (1965) |

"Crawling Up a Hill" is the debut single by English blues rock band John Mayall & the Bluesbreakers, released in 1964. It was written by the band's founder and singer-songwriter John Mayall. A live version is included on the band's 1965 live album, John Mayall Plays John Mayall. The single was the first released recording to feature future Fleetwood Mac core member John McVie on bass.

== Personnel ==
Single version

- John Mayall - vocals, organ, harmonica
- Bernie Watson - guitar
- John McVie - bass
- Martin Hart - drums

John Mayall Plays John Mayall live version

- John Mayall - vocals, organ, harmonica
- Roger Dean - guitar
- John McVie - bass
- Hughie Flint - drums

== Katie Melua version ==
"Crawling Up a Hill"

Single by Katie Melua

from the album Call Off the Search
- B-side: "Crawling up a Hill" (live version); "Jack's Room"
- Released: 19 July 2004
- Length: 3:29
- Label: Dramatico
- Songwriter(s): John Mayall
- Producer(s): Mike Batt

Katie Melua singles chronology
| "Call Off the Search" (2004) | "Crawling Up a Hill" (2004) | "Nine Million Bicycles" (2005) |

The song was covered by Georgian-British singer Katie Melua for her debut album, Call Off the Search (2003). It was released as a single in 2004 and peaked at number 46 in the United Kingdom and number 88 in the Netherlands.

=== Track listing ===
1. "Crawling Up a Hill" 3:28
2. "Crawling Up a Hill" (Live Version) 3:18
3. "Jack's Room" 5:48
4. "Crawling Up a Hill" (Video) 3:19

=== Charts ===
| Chart (2004) | Peak position |
|---|---|
| Netherlands (Single Top 100) | 88 |
| Scotland (OCC) | 49 |
| UK Singles (OCC) | 46 |
| UK Indie (OCC) | 7 |
