= I Cried for You (Katie Melua song) =

2005 single by Katie Melua

Single by Katie Melua

from the album Piece by Piece
- A-side: "Just like Heaven"
- B-side: "Pictures on a Video Screen"
- Released: 5 December 2005
- Genre: Jazz, blues
- Length: 3:39
- Label: Dramatico
- Songwriter(s): Katie Melua
- Producer(s): Mike Batt

Katie Melua singles chronology
"Nine Million Bicycles" (2005)	"I Cried for You" / "Just like Heaven" (2005)	"Spider's Web" (2006)

"I Cried for You" is a song by Georgian-born singer Katie Melua, released as the second single from her second album, Piece by Piece, on 5 December 2005. The single is a double A-side consisting of "I Cried for You", which is one of Melua's own compositions, and a cover of the Cure's song "Just Like Heaven", the latter of which was the theme song of the film Just like Heaven. "I Cried for You" is inspired by the idea of Jesus and Mary Magdalene having been in a close relationship, and the loss she would have felt.

== Video ==
The "I Cried for You" music video takes place in a room similar to a salon/dressing room, except it is surrounded by darkness and is desolate apart from a man in a chair and a woman. When the music begins, the man lip synchs to Melua's voice, and the woman begins to perform incisions in his skin and take, piece by piece, parts of his face away, revealing Melua. The man continues to sing, unperturbed until his mouth and neck are removed (at which point his hands grip the chair handles tightly), and he stops singing and Melua's lips are singing underneath. Melua's entire face is eventually revealed, her hair loosened, and the pieces of the man's face are disposed of in a bin.

Then, after a short part in which Melua sings and can move her head again, the woman performs similar incisions and begins to remove Melua's face, revealing the man underneath her again. Again, Melua sings unperturbed until the mouth and neck are removed (the man's hands grip the chair again). When the entire face is removed, the man seems relieved. Instead of him taking over the song as the mouth is removed, Melua's lips continue to sing the song and her eyes continue to blink until the very end, when the pieces of her face are put in the bin.

== Track listings ==
1. "I Cried for You" (Katie Melua)
2. "Just Like Heaven" (Simon Gallup, Robert Smith)
3. "Pictures On A Video Screen" (Mike Batt)

== Personnel ==
- Vocals: Katie Melua
- Guitars: Katie Melua, Chris Spedding, Jim Cregan
- Piano: Mike Batt
- Bass: Tim Harries
- Drums: Henry Spinetti
- Solo Trumpet: Dominic Glover
- Solo violin: Mike Darcy
- Percussion: Martin Ditchman, Chris Karan
- Orchestra: The Irish Film Orchestra; conductor: Mike Batt

== Production ==
- Producers: Mike Batt
- Engineer: Steve Sale
- Arranger: Mike Batt

== Charts ==
Chart (2005–2006)	Peak position
Belgium (Ultratop 50 Flanders)	50
Netherlands (Single Top 100)	32
UK Singles (OCC) "I Cried for You" / "Just Like Heaven"	35
UK Indie (OCC)	9
