= Warwick Records (United Kingdom) =

British record label

Warwick Records is a British record label active in the 1970s and early 1980s, established by Ian Miles, which specialised in producing song compilations that were sometimes given away as 'promos' with other products, such as magazines. Warwick was also a TV-advertised budget record label, and was distributed by Multiple Sound Distributors in the UK.

== History ==
In the late 1970s, Warwick became closely associated with CBS Records, releasing compilations from their catalogue such as Tony Bennett's 20 Greatest Hits by Tony Bennett, with Pye Records for three Acker Bilk albums, and The Hit album series. Promoted on TV at budget prices, many issues appeared in the UK album charts.

== Artists ==
- Ronnie Price
- Bev-Phillips Orchestra
- Sidney Sax
- Kenny Baker
- Stan Roderick
- Tony Fisher
- Keith Bird
- Hamilton 'Pops' Orchestra
- Vic Flick
- Brian Daly
- Neil Richardson Orchestra
- Jack Emblow
- Sidney Blair
- Terry Walsh and the Phantoms
- Sandy Blair
- The Mellotronics
- Gordon Langford
- The Hammermen
- The Don Lusher Trio and Orchestra
- Steam Heat
- Ronnie Hughes
- Bert Ezzard
- Humphrey Lyttleton
- John Wilbraham
- Maurice Platt
- Johnny Edwards
- Jackie Armstrong
- Bill Geldard
- Roy Wilcox
- Ray Swinfield
- Derek Collins
- Ronnie Ross
- Brian Dee
- Stan Barrett
- Bobby Orr
- Joe Mudele
- Tristram Fry
- Leslie Pearson
- Wout Steenhuis
- Bert Weedon – the influential English guitarist and composer released the TV-advertised compilations 22 Golden Guitar Greats and Let The Good Times Roll on Warwick, licensed by Polydor Ltd (UK) Ltd.
- Acker Bilk – the clarinettist composer released the TV-advertised compilations Sheer Magic, Evergreen and Mellow Music on Warwick, licensed by Pye Records Ltd.
- Harry Secombe – the Welsh entertainer released the TV-advertised compilations Bless This House and Golden Memories: A Treasury of 20 Unforgettable Songs (with Moira Anderson) on Warwick
- Adrian Brett – the golden flute player released the TV-advertised compilations Echoes of Gold and Stepping Stones on Warwick
- Don Gibson – the American songwriter and country musician released the TV-advertised compilations Country Number One and Country My Way on Warwick
- Des O'Connor – building on his successful career as a singer, Warwick released the TV-advertised compilations Just For You: 20 Special Songs and Remember Romance – 20 Great Love Songs
- Brotherhood of Man – the British pop group released two albums with the label: Sing 20 Number One Hits (1980) and 20 Disco Greats / 20 Love Songs (1981)

== Albums ==
Year	Name	Cat.No
1974	All The Best From Scotland: Various Artists	WW 5000
1975	Bernard Manning & Joe Henderson: 40 All-Time Singalong Party Hits	WW 5001
1975	Best of British Brass: Various Artists	WW 5002
1975	Salute To Wales: Ivor Emmanual with the Voices of the Frocysylite Male Voice Choir	WW 5004
1975	Ed Stewart: Stewpot's Pop Party	WW 5005
1975	30 Smash Hits of the War Years Vol.2: Band of Her Majesty's Guards Division	WW 5006
1975	Gracie Fields: The Golden Years of Gracie Fields	WW 5007
1975	Freddie Staff And His Sensational Swing Band: Swinging Stereo Sensation – 20 Great Hits of the Swing Era	WW 5008
1975	Graham Todd's Harmonising Hammond – 40 All Time Greats	WW 5009
1975	Bernard Manning: My Kind of Music	WW 5011
1976	Instrumental Gold: 20 Instrumental Hits	WW 5012
1976	David Hamilton's Hot Shots: Various Artists	WW 5014
1976	Anita Harris: Love To Sing	WW 5015
1976	The Cliff Adams Singers: Sing Something Simple '76	WW 5016–7
1976	Gold on Silver: Beverley-Phillips Orchestra – 20 Gold Hits From The Silver Screen	WW 5018
1976	Bert Weedon's 22 Golden Guitar Greats	WW 5019
1976	Songs of Praise: An Hour of Favourite Hymns	WW 5020
1976	The Very Best of Tony Bennett: 20 Greatest Hits	PR 5021
1976	The Best of the Wombles: 20 Wombling Greats	PR 5022
1976	Hit Scene 76: Various Artists	PR 5023
1977	The Magic of Rodgers And Hammerstein: 22 Show Stoppers	WW 5024
1977	The Everly Brothers: Living Legends – 24 Original Golden Greats	WW 5027
1977	Acker Bilk And His Clarinet: Sheer Magic – 20 Hits	WW 5028
1977	Strictly Instrumental: 20 All Gold Instrumental Hits	WW 5029
1977	22 Golden Piano Greats: Various Artists	WW 5030
1977	The Incomparable Brook Benton: 20 Greatest Hits	WW 5031
1977	The Very Best of Frankie Laine: 20 Greatest Hits	PR 5032
1977	22 Golden Trumpet Greats: Various Artists	WW 5033
1977	Little Richard: 22 Original Hits	WW 5034
1977	Bert Weedon: Let The Good Times Roll – 55 Rock 'N Party Greats	WW 5035
1977	The Remarkable Ray Stevens: 20 Incredible Hits	WW 5036
1977	Fonzie Favorites: Various Artists	WW 5037
1977	The Salvation Army: By Request	WW 5038
1977	Country Girl Meets Country Boy: Various Artists	PR 5039
1977	Tammy Wynette: 20 Country Classics	PR 5040
1978	Christina Gregg: Music 'N Motion	WW 5041
1978	Robert Mandell / Melachrino Orchestra: Beyond The Blue Horizon	WW 5042
1978	Liberace: Mr. Entertainment	WW 5043
1978	Ray Conniff: 20 Number One Hits	PR 5044
1978	Acker Bilk: Evergreen – 20 All-Time Greats	PW 5045
1978	Love Songs – 20 Songs of Love: Various Artists	WW 5046
1978	Black Velvet – 20 Greatest Hits: Various Artists	WW 5047
1978	One Hit Wonders: Various Artists	WW 5048
1979	Double Delight: Various Artists	WW 5049
1978	Lemon Popsicle: Various Artists	WW 5050
1978	Les Reed Orchestra: You Should Be Dancing – 20 Dance And Party Greats	WW 5051
1978	Harry Secombe: Bless This House – 20 Songs of Joy	WW 5052
1978	Doris Day: 20 Golden Greats	PR 5053
1978	The Biddu Orchestra: Disco Gold	PR 5054
1978	Yankee Doodle Disco: Liberty Belle	WW 5055
1978	The Alexander Brothers: Two Highland Lads	WW 5056
1979	Country Portraits: Various Artists	WW 5057
1979	The Spinners: Meet The Spinners – 21 Great Songs	WW 5058
1979	Jonathan King: Hit Millionaire	WW 5059
1979	Rockabilly Dynamite: Various Artists	WW 5060
1979	The Bitch – 20 Smash Disco Hits: Various Artists	WW 5061
1979	Adrian Brett: Echoes of Gold – 22 All Time Greats	WW 5062
1979	Andy Stewart: Welcome To Scotland	WW 5063
1979	The Buddy Holly Story: Original Soundtrack	WW 5064
1979	Johnnie Ray: 20 Golden Greats	PR 5065
1979	Guy Mitchell: 20 Golden Greats	PR 5066
1979	The Mantovani Golden Collection: 20 Masterpieces of Music	WW 5067
1979	The Bachelors: 25 Golden Greats	WW 5068
1979	Acker Bilk: Mellow Music – 20 All-Time Greats	WW 5069
1979	Country Guitar: 20 Country Instrumental Greats	WW 5070
1979	Des O'Connor: Just For You – 20 Special Songs	WW 5071
1979	Mary O'Hara: Tranquility – 20 Songs of Life	WW 5072
1979	Andy Stewart: Sing A Song of Scotland	WW 5073–4
1979	Yesterday's Hero: Various Artists	WW 5075
1979	The Boppers: 20 Rock 'N Boppin' Hits	WW 5076
1979	Francesca Annis & Leo McKern: The Country Diary of an Edwardian Lady	WW 5077
1980	Going Steady: Various Artists	WW 5078
1980	Don Gibson: Country Number One! – 22 Country Classics	WW 5079
1980	The Best of Gallagher And Lyle: 20 Beautiful Songs	WW 5080
1980	The Very Best of Val Doonican: 20 Great Songs	WW 5081
1980	Country Welcome: Various Artists	WW 5082
1980	Brenda Lee: Little Miss Dynamite – 22 Sensational Hits	WW 5083
1980	Boxcar Willie: King of the Road – 20 Great Tracks	WW 5084
1980	Barbara Woodhouse: Training Dogs Her Way	WW 5085
1980	Robin Sarstedt: You Must Remember This	PW 5086
1980	Brotherhood of Man: Sing 20 Number One Hits	WW 5087
1980	Joan Collins: Beauty And Exercise Record	WW 5088
1980	The Best of Pat Boone: 22 Original Hits	WW 5089
1980	The Max Jaffa Orchestra: Reflections in Gold	WW 5090
1980	Adrian Brett: Stepping Stones – 22 All Time Greats	WW 5091
1980	Kiki Dee's Greatest Hits	WW 5092
1980	The National Philharmonic Orchestra: Golden Overtures	WW 5093/4/5
1980	The Very Best of Lulu – 20 Great Songs	WW 5097
1980	Ken Dodd: 20 Golden Greats of Ken Dodd	WW 5098
1980	Dana: Everything Is Beautiful – 20 Songs of Inspiration	WW 5099
1980	Des O'Connor: Remember Romance- 20 Great Love Songs	WW 5100
1981	George Hamilton IV: 20 Country Classics	WW 5101
1981	Conway Twitty: It's Only Make Believe – 20 Great Songs	WW 5102
1981	Don Gibson: Country My Way – 22 Great Tracks	WW 5103
1981	Colm Wilkinson: 16 Years of Irish Eurovision Born To Sing	WW 5104
1981	International Festival of Country Music: Various Artists	WW 5105
1981	Wout Steenhuis and the Kontikis: Hawaiian Christmas	HXS 100
1981	Wout Steenhuis and the Kontikis: Hawaiian Paradise – 24 Golden Hawaiian Guitar Greats	WW 5106
1981	Harry Secombe & Moira Anderson: Golden Memories – A Treasury Of 20 Unforgettable Songs	WW 5107
1981	Disco Erotica: 20 Sensual Disco Greats – Various Artists	WW 5108
1981	Billie Jo Spears: Country Girl – 22 Sensational Songs	WW 5109
1981	Brotherhood of Man: 20 Disco Greats / 20 Love Songs (double album)	WW 5111/0
1981	The Very Best of Louis Armstrong: 20 Golden Greats	WW 5112
1981	Adam Faith: 24 Golden Greats	WW 5113
1982	The Very Best of 5th Dimension	WW 5114
1982	Jungle Heat: 18 Tropical Songs – Various Artists	WW 5115
1981	Chas N Dave's Christmas Jamboree Bag	WW 5116
1982	Ray Price's Greatest Hits	WW 5117
1982	Moe Bandy: 20 Songs of the American Cowboy	WW 5118
1982	The Very Best of Oakridge Boys	WW 5119
1982	Country Rock: Various Artists	WW 5120
1982	P.S. I Love You: 18 Great Love Songs – Various Artists	WW 5121
1982	Sally Thomsett: The Lotte Berk Exercise Class – Get Physical!	WW 5122
1982	The Hit List: Various Artists	WW 5123
1982	The Hitlist Special: Various Artists	WEP 123
1982	Hits of the Screaming Sixties: Various Artists	WW 5124–5
1982	Bobby Crush: The Incredible Double Decker	WW 5126–7
1982	The Best of the Barron Knights: 27 Sidesplitters	WW 5128–9
1982	London Philharmonic Orchestra: A Classic Case of Funk	WW 5130
1982	The English Chorale: The English Chorale Sing Golden Gospel	WW 5131
1983	The English Chorale: The English Chorale Sing Christmas Gospel	WW 5132
1982	Roger Webb And His Orchestra: Midnight Magic	WW 5133
1982	Roger Webb and the Quartet: The Magic of Cole Porter	WW 5134
1982	Modern Rockers: Various Artists	WW 5135
1983	The Sleighriders: A Very Merry Disco – 32 Christmas Crackers	WW 5136
1984	Howard Keel: And I Love You So	WW 5137
1984	Bobby Crush: The Bobby Crush Singalong Party	WW 5138
1984	Carl Perkins: Rock N Roll Party	WW 5139
1984	Hymns Triumphant: London Philharmonic Choir & National Philharmonic Orchestra	WW 5140
1984	Merry Christmas To You: Various Artists	WW 5141
1985	The New Reflections Orchestra: The Best of Beautiful Music	WW 2000
1985	Country Harvest: 16 Golden Country Hits	WW 2008
1985	Hit Action: Various Artists	WW 1000
1985	Country Rainbow	WW 1001
1985	Yesterday When We Were...: Various Artists	WW 1002
1985	50 Fabulous Million Sellers: Various Artists	WW 1003
1985	Sounds Beautiful: Various Artists	WW 1004
1986	Frankie Laine: His Greatest Hits	WW 2014
1986	Harry Secombe & Moira Anderson: This Is My Lovely Day – 20 Golden Memories	WW 2036
1986	The Nicolas Sands Singers: The Joy of Christmas	WW 2038
1987	10th Anniversary: Bing Crosby	WW 1005
1987	Games That Lovers Play: The Nelson Riddle Orchestra	WW 2067
