= The Frightened City =

1961 British film by John Lemont

- Original film poster
- Directed by: John Lemont
- Written by: Leigh Vance
- Produced by: John Lemont; Leigh Vance
- Starring: Herbert Lom; John Gregson; Sean Connery; Alfred Marks; Yvonne Romain
- Cinematography: Desmond Dickinson
- Music by: Norrie Paramor
- Production company: Zodiac Productions
- Distributed by: Anglo Amalgamated Film Distributors
- Release date: 18 August 1961
- Running time: 97 minutes
- Country: United Kingdom
- Language: English

The Frightened City is a 1961 British neo-noir gangster film directed by John Lemont and starring Herbert Lom, John Gregson and Sean Connery. It was written by Leigh Vance. The film is about extortion rackets and gang warfare in the West End of London.

== Plot ==
Criminal accountant Waldo Zhernikov is involved in protection racketeering and plans to organise the six gangs that operate the rackets into a single organisation, under the control of crook Harry Foulcher. Burglar Paddy Damion is lured into the scheme by Foulcher as a money collector. When Alf Peters, one of the gang bosses, quarrels with Foulcher and walks out of the scheme, Foulcher murders him. Foulcher himself is killed by Damion, angry at Peters' death.

== Cast ==
- Herbert Lom as Waldo Zhernikov
- John Gregson as Detective Inspector Sayers
- Sean Connery as Paddy Damion
- Alfred Marks as Harry Foulcher
- Yvonne Romain as Anya Bergodin
- Olive McFarland as Sadie
- Frederick Piper as Sergeant Bob Ogle
- John Stone as Hood
- David Davies as Alf Peters
- Tom Bowman as Tanky Thomas
- Robert Cawdron as Nero
- George Pastell as Sanchetti
- Patrick Holt as Superintendent Dave Carter
- Martin Wyldeck as security officer
- Kenneth Griffith as Wally Smith
- Bruce Seton as Assistant Commissioner

== Production ==
The movie was the first production from a new company, Zodiac, and was from a writer and director who had made The Shakedown for Sydney Box. It was originally called Cry Wolf.

Filming started 5 December 1960. It was one of several crime films made by Anglo-Amalgamated.

== Music ==
The Shadows had a hit single, no. 3 on the British charts in May 1961, with their version of the theme song "The Frightened City" (Norrie Paramor). It was subsequently covered by Peter Frampton in the 1996 collection Twang!: A Tribute to Hank Marvin & the Shadows.

== Release ==
The London premiere of “The Frightened City” took place at the Odeon Marble Arch on 9 August 1961.

== Box office ==
The film performed well at the British box office.

== Critical reception ==
In a contemporary review, The Monthly Film Bulletin wrote: "A holding thriller, with a fairly plausible London background, racy direction, occasional laconic humour, and skilful though! familiar performances from John Gregson – doggedly and moodily honest – and Herbert Lom, suavely villainous."

Variety described it as "a conventional but brisk gangster yarn," concluding that "Herbert Lom plays the brains of the crooked organization with urbane villainy and equally reliable John Gregson makes a solid, confident job of the dedicated cop. Alfred Marks is cast offbeat as Lom’s gangster lieutenant. Marks gives a rich, oily, sinister and yet often amusing portrayal of an ambitious thug who is prepared to turn killer to get his own way. Comparative newcomer, rugged Sean Connery makes a distinct impression as an Irish crook, with an eye for the ladies. Connery combines toughness, charm and Irish blarney."

The Radio Times Guide to Films gave the film 2/5 stars, writing: "Limping along years after Hollywood's postwar exterior location thrillers such as The Naked City, this British attempt at the genre just about manages to hold the interest. The story is about London gangsters falling out over a protection racket, and features a young Sean Connery and a pre-Pink Panther Herbert Lom at his most seedily sinister."

According to a review on the AllMovie website: "The film itself is only of moderate interest, a gangster thriller that's engaging but not special; but the cast makes it worth watching."
