= 20 Disco Greats / 20 Love Songs =

20 Disco Greats

Studio album by Brotherhood of Man
- Released: November 1981
- Genre: Pop, MOR
- Length: 57:45 (Disco Greats); 59:01 (Love Songs)
- Label: Warwick
- Producer: Tony Hiller

Brotherhood of Man chronology
Sing 20 Number One Hits (1980)	20 Disco Greats (1981)	Lightning Flash (1983)

20 Love Songs
- Cover of 20 Love Songs

20 Disco Greats / 20 Love Songs is a double album released by British pop group Brotherhood of Man which was released as two separate albums, but sold together as a 'buy one get one free' package, as was the popular trend at the time.

== Background ==
This album was a collection of cover versions, following on from their successful Sing 20 Number One Hits album released a year earlier. The songs contained were cover versions of hit songs from the UK charts spanning the years 1972 to 1981. The album was released by Warwick Records (United Kingdom) in November 1981, but failed to replicate the success of the previous one, thus ending their contract with the label. Some months later, the group commented on the album; "we recorded [the album] to keep the group together and get our faces on the TV screen where they were advertised". On the lack of new material present they said "we didn't bother to release a single or record a proper album because we knew they wouldn't make any impact". One of the musicians used on the album was Barry Upton (playing keyboards) who would the following year become a member of Brotherhood of Man, after Lee Sheriden left the band.

The album contained no single releases. The label on the 20 Disco Greats record gives the title as Dance Yourself Dizzy, while the label on 20 Love Songs gives the title as In Love. Although listed separately, the songs "Copacabana" and "I'll Go Where Your Music Takes Me" merge into each other, and have been listed as one track on subsequent compilation releases. The song "She's out of My Life" is listed as such, but is sung (by member Sandra Stevens) as "He's out of My Life". A noticeable trend on the album was the tendency to reverse the sex of the original performer. Where songs had been originally performed by males, they were performed here by the female members, such as Rod Stewart's "Do Ya Think I'm Sexy" sung by Sandra and Nicky and Baccara's "Yes Sir I Can Boogie" by Martin and Lee.

Of the covers contained, the earliest was Harry Nilsson's version of "Without You", which was a No.1 hit in March 1972, while the most recent was Stevie Wonder's "Happy Birthday", which had reached No.2 in August 1981. Of the 40 tracks, 13 had been UK No.1s, while all the rest were UK top 20 hits apart from "Copacabana" and "I'll Go Where Your Music Takes Me", which reached No.42 and No.23 respectively. The album contained three songs by The Bee Gees, as well as Barbra Streisand's "Woman in Love", which was written by them. ABBA - a group Brotherhood of Man had been compared to many times during their career, were included with a cover of their song "Lay All Your Love On Me", which at the time was the group's most recent (although one of their less significant) hit.

The album was released on Vinyl and Cassette, and although has never been released on Compact Disc, many of the tracks have appeared on various compilation CDs of the group in recent years. The cover photos were taken at Tokyo Joe's night club (now defunct) in Mayfair, London. During the photo-shoot, the group were presented with gold discs of their previous album by Ian Miles, managing director of Warwick records.

== Track listing ==
=== 20 Disco Greats ===
Side One
No.	Title	Writer(s)	Original Artist, Year	Length
1.	"Dance Yourself Dizzy"	Adrian Baker / Eddie Seago	Liquid Gold, 1980	3:38
2.	"Use It Up and Wear It Out"	Sandy Linzer / L. Russel Brown	Odyssey, 1980	2:52
3.	"Blame It on the Boogie"	Mick Jackson / David Jackson / Elmar Krohn	Based on version by The Jacksons, 1978	2:44
4.	"Do Ya Think I'm Sexy"	Rod Stewart / Carmine Appice	Rod Stewart, 1978	3:07
5.	"Copacabana (At the Copa)"	Barry Manilow / Bruce Sussman / Jack Feldman	Barry Manilow, 1978	2:16
6.	"I'll Go Where Your Music Takes Me"	Biddu	Jimmy James & The Vagabonds, 1976	3:06
7.	"Feels Like I'm in Love"	Ray Dorset	Kelly Marie, 1980	2:43
8.	"Stayin' Alive"	Barry Gibb / Maurice Gibb / Robin Gibb	The Bee Gees, 1977	2:40
9.	"Singin' in the Rain"	Arthur Freed / Nacio Herb Brown	Based on version by Sheila B. Devotion, 1978	3:02
10.	"Y.M.C.A."	Henri Belolo / Jacques Morali / Victor Willis	The Village People, 1978	2:47

Side Two
No.	Title	Writer(s)	Original Artist, Year	Length
1.	"D.I.S.C.O."	Daniel Vangarde / Jean Kluger	Ottawan, 1980	3:09
2.	"Lay All Your Love on Me"	Benny Andersson / Björn Ulvaeus	ABBA, 1981	2:42
3.	"Night Fever"	Barry Gibb / Robin Gibb / Maurice Gibb	The Bee Gees, 1978	3:08
4.	"Brown Girl in the Ring"	Frank Farian, based on a Traditional	Boney M, 1978	2:58
5.	"Happy Birthday"	Stevie Wonder	Stevie Wonder, 1981	3:35
6.	"Yes Sir I Can Boogie"	Frank Dostal / Rolf Soja	Baccara, 1977	2:36
7.	"Ring My Bell"	Frederick Knight	Anita Ward, 1979	2:27
8.	"Knock on Wood"	Eddie Floyd / Steve Cropper	Based on version by Amii Stewart, 1979	2:24
9.	"Le Freak"	Nile Rodgers / Bernard Edwards	Chic, 1978	2:49
10.	"Pop Muzik"	Robin Scott	M, 1979	3:02

=== 20 Love Songs ===
Side One
No.	Title	Writer(s)	Original Artist, Year	Length
1.	"Silly Love Songs"	Paul McCartney	Wings, 1976	3:20
2.	"Woman in Love"	Barry Gibb / Maurice Gibb / Robin Gibb	Barbra Streisand, 1980	3:00
3.	"Tragedy"	Barry Gibb / Maurice Gibb / Robin Gibb	The Bee Gees, 1979	3:19
4.	"With You I'm Born Again"	David Shire / Carol Connors	Billy Preston and Syreeta, 1979	3:09
5.	"Crying"	Roy Orbison / Joe Melson	Based on version by Don McLean, 1980	2:58
6.	"One Day I'll Fly Away"	Joe Sample / Will Jennings	Randy Crawford, 1980	3:05
7.	"She's out of My Life"	Tom Bahler	Michael Jackson, 1980	2:39
8.	"Without You"	Peter Ham / Tom Evans	Based on version by Nilsson, 1972	2:49
9.	"More Than in Love"	Barry Leng / Simon May	Kate Robbins and Beyond, 1981	2:53
10.	"Evergreen"	Barbra Streisand / Paul Williams	Barbra Streisand, 1976	2:49

Side Two
No.	Title	Writer(s)	Original Artist, Year	Length
1.	"Miss You Nights"	Dave Townsend	Cliff Richard, 1976	3:08
2.	"My Eyes Adored You"	Bob Crewe / Kenny Nolan	Frankie Valli, 1974	2:52
3.	"How 'Bout Us"	Dana Walden	Champaign, 1981	3:00
4.	"Song Sung Blue"	Neil Diamond	Neil Diamond, 1972	2:39
5.	"Being with You"	Smokey Robinson	Smokey Robinson, 1981	2:46
6.	"Chanson D'Amour"	Wayne Shanklin	Based on version by The Manhattan Transfer, 1977	2:34
7.	"Woman"	John Lennon	John Lennon, 1981	2:56
8.	"A Little Bit More"	Bobby Gosh	Dr Hook, 1976	2:54
9.	"I Wanna Stay with You"	Benny Gallagher / Graham Lyle	Gallagher and Lyle, 1976	2:51
10.	"All by Myself"	Eric Carmen	Eric Carmen, 1975	3:21

== Personnel ==
- Martin Lee – vocals
- Lee Sheriden – vocals
- Nicky Stevens – vocals
- Sandra Stevens – vocals
- Tony Hiller – Producer
- Colin Frechter – Arranger
- Paul Chave – Photography
