= Grosvenor Road Studios =

Recording studios in Handsworth, Birmingham, England

Coordinates: 52.513611°N 1.912222°W

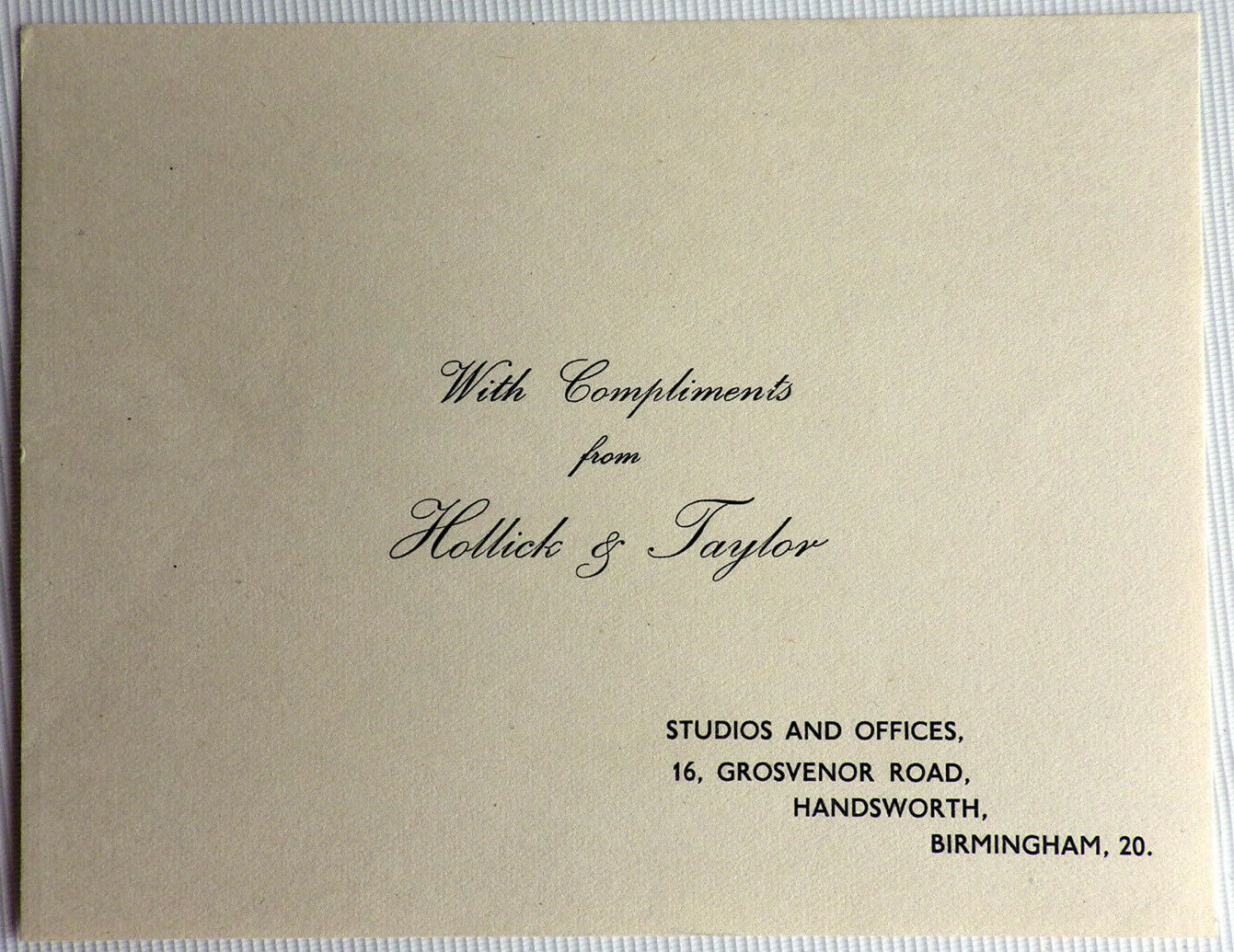
Hollick and Taylor compliments slip, used in 1951 - note "Handsworth" address

Grosvenor Road Studios (GRS), formerly known as Hollick and Taylor Studios, is a suite of recording studios in Handsworth, (Note: Some sources give the location as Perry Barr, the studio being much closer to its modern-day centre than to that of Handsworth. The studio's communications consistently gave its address as Handsworth; its modern postal address is also Handsworth.) Birmingham, England. It is the oldest extant recording studio in the city.

The studios are in a former five-bedroomed house, 16 Grosvenor Road, which was built in 1872. (Note: Until 1911, when it was absorbed into Birmingham, in Warwickshire, Handsworth was part of Staffordshire.) From 1945 the house was occupied by a married couple, John R. and Joan Taylor, who developed a recording studio there shortly after arriving. The studios became known as Hollick & Taylor when John set up a partnership with Charles Hollick, an engineer.

Both Noddy Holder (with Steve Brett & the Mavericks) and John Bonham (with The Senators) made their first recordings at Grosvenor Road. It was also used by Spencer Davis. Other bands to record there include The Applejacks, The Fortunes, The Moody Blues, The Move, The Rockin' Berries, Steel Pulse, Carl Wayne and the Vikings, and Pat Wayne & The Beachcombers, and others that were part of the city's Brum Beat movement. Jeff Wayne used the studios in 1971 or 1972 to record music for an Ansells beer television commercial, with Chris Spedding on guitar. The Brighouse and Rastrick Brass Band recorded their UK No. 2 hit "The Floral Dance" there, and Jasper Carrott's double A-side comedy single "Funky Moped"/"Magic Roundabout", a UK Top 5 chart hit, was produced by Jeff Lynne, with Bev Bevan on drums and backing vocals on the former track. Comedian Ken Dodd recorded his radio shows at GRS, and the actors Gordon Jackson, John le Mesurier and John Nettles all made recordings there. Cliff Richard used the studio to launch his 1976 I'm Nearly Famous album.

Studio clients also included school orchestras, brass bands, military bands, and cathedral choirs. Test pressings and performers' self-funded records were released on the Hollick & Taylor label, with some commercial releases - including a 1972 release by the Bert Weedon Quartet - on the Grosvenor label.

Working together in the studio, John and Joan Taylor also made foley recordings for film and television, including the Gerry Anderson series Thunderbirds and Stingray. Dubbing was also done there including for the 1961 film The Guns of Navarone.

The name Grosvenor Recording Studio Complex was adopted after Hollick's death. Eventually, the Taylor's sons, Christopher and Richard, were brought into the business. In 2003 John and Joan Taylor retired to Peterborough and the studios were acquired by Black Voices as a social enterprise, managed by a voluntary board. In 2008, £1.5 million in grant funding enabled a major refurbishment. The same year the gardens were redeveloped as a community facility, and in November a sculpture of a peony seed pod, by Juginder Lamba in Shropshire oak, was unveiled by Prince Edward, Duke of Kent. For a period from its refurbishment the studio operated under the name Centre for Music & Arts Technology.

As of 2015, the complex had three studios - the largest accommodating up to 50 performers - and was still using its 1950s microphones.
