= Sing 20 Number One Hits =

Studio album by Brotherhood of Man
- Released: 1 November 1980
- Genre: Pop, MOR
- Length: 60.12
- Label: Warwick
- Producer: Tony Hiller

Brotherhood of Man chronology
Good Fortune (1980)	Sing 20 Number One Hits (1980)	20 Disco Greats / 20 Love Songs (1981)

Singles from Sing 20 Number One Hits
- 1. "One Day at a Time" Released: 1981 (South Africa only)

Sing 20 Number One Hits is the tenth album by British pop group Brotherhood of Man. It was the first of two consecutive cover version albums by them. Released in 1980, it became the group's second biggest-selling album.

== Background ==
This album was a departure from their previous albums in that it was made up of cover versions. The songs featured were all UK No.1 hits from the years 1974 to 1980. The album was released in November 1980 on Warwick Records (United Kingdom) and reached No.14 in the UK Album Charts. It became the group's second biggest selling album, remaining in the top 20 over Christmas 1980. It was awarded a gold disc for sales of over 100,000 by the BPI on 17 December 1980. This was the group's first album (of two) for Warwick Records, which released a series of albums alongside this by various other artists in the lead up to Christmas - Sing 20 Number One Hits being one of the most successful of these and was TV advertised. The album also reached No.29 in the New Zealand album charts in May 1981.

This album, like the group's previous albums was produced by manager Tony Hiller. Commenting on the collection in 1995, Hiller commended their professionalism in the studio, stating; "They were tremendously fast, we could do an album in two weeks. They would bring up their own harmonies. They were a joy to work with and it shows".

Of the songs contained, the earliest number one was a cover of "When Will I See You Again" by The Three Degrees from August 1974 and the most recent being "What's Another Year" by Johnny Logan from May 1980. Other notable covers included "Mull of Kintyre" by Wings, which was the UK's biggest-selling single at that time, and ABBA's "Dancing Queen" - a group that Brotherhood of Man had been compared to many times over their career. Altogether, two songs were from 1974, two from 1975, three from 1976, three from 1977, two from 1978, five from 1979 and three from 1980. Brotherhood of Man themselves scored three British No.1s during this period.

No singles were released from the album in the UK, but track "One Day at a Time" was released as a single in South Africa. The album was released on Vinyl and Cassette, and although many of the tracks had been released on various compact disc compilations over the years, the album in its original form wasn't released on CD until 10 October 2011 via the Northworld label.

== Track listing ==
Side One

1. "We Don't Talk Anymore" (Alan Tarney) 3:11
  Original No.1: Cliff Richard, 1979
2. "Bright Eyes" (Mike Batt) 3:27
  Original No.1: Art Garfunkel, 1979
3. "When You're in Love with a Beautiful Woman" (Even Stevens) 2:39
  Original No.1: Dr Hook, 1979
4. "Don't Give Up on Us Baby" (Tony Macaulay) 3:01
  Original No.1: David Soul, 1977
5. "Together We Are Beautiful" (Ken Leray) 2:52
  Original No.1: Fern Kinney, 1980
6. "What's Another Year" (Shay Healy) 3:03
  Original No.1: by Johnny Logan, 1980
7. "I Will Survive" (Freddie Perren / Dino Fekaris) 2:56
  Original No.1: Gloria Gaynor, 1979
8. "I'm Not in Love" (Eric Stewart / Graham Gouldman) 3:13
  Original No.1: 10cc, 1975
9. "Working My Way Back to You" (Sandy Linzer / Denny Randell) 3:02
  Original No.1: The Detroit Spinners, 1980
10. "Mull of Kintyre" (Paul McCartney) 3:00
  Original No.1: Wings, 1977

Side Two

1. "Dancing Queen" (Benny Andersson / Björn Ulvaeus / Stig Anderson) 2:36
  Original No.1: ABBA, 1976
2. "When I Need You" (Albert Hammond / Carole Bayer Sager) 2:57
  Original No.1: Leo Sayer, 1977
3. "Rivers of Babylon" (Brent Dowe / Trevor McNaughton / Frank Farian / Reyam) 2:46
  Original No.1: Boney M, 1978
4. "If You Leave Me Now" (Peter Cetera) 2:49
  Original No.1: Chicago, 1976
5. "Don't Go Breaking My Heart" (Ann Orson / Carte Blanche) 3:02
  Original No.1: Elton John and Kiki Dee, 1976
6. "Three Times a Lady" (Lionel Richie) 3:08
  Original No.1: The Commodores, 1978
7. "One Day at a Time" (Marijohn Wilkin / Kris Kristofferson) 3:53
  Original No.1: Lena Martell, 1979
8. "When Will I See You Again" (Kenneth Gamble / Leon Huff) 2:37
  Original No.1: The Three Degrees, 1974
9. "Annie's Song" (John Denver) 3:06
  Original No.1 by John Denver, 1974
10. "Sailing" (Gavin Sutherland) 2:54
  Original No.1: Rod Stewart, 1975

== Personnel ==
- Martin Lee - vocals
- Lee Sheriden - vocals
- Nicky Stevens - vocals
- Sandra Stevens - vocals
- Tony Hiller - Producer
- Colin Frechter - Musical director
- Chris Dibble, Jonathan Miller - Engineers
- Denis King - Photography
- Recorded at Lansdowne Studios

== Chart performance ==
Country	Peak position
UK	14
New Zealand	29
