= Adrian Brett =

British flautist

- Born: 1945 (age 80–81); Deal, Kent
- Origin: United Kingdom
- Genres: Pop
- Occupation: Flautist
- Instrument: Flute
- Years active: 1959-present
- Label: Warwick Records

Adrian Brett is a British flautist.

In 1979, Brett released an album entitled Echoes of Gold, Warwick Records which appeared in the Top 20 of the UK Albums Chart. He received a gold disc for successful sales.

Another album, Stepping Stones, was later issued by Warwick. Stepping Stones peaked at number 53 in Australia in March 1982.

Brett also specialises in ethnic flutes and pipes. It was he who played the famous ocarina motif on Ennio Morricone's theme for "For A Few Dollars More". Years later he would play lead ethnic flutes on Mike Batt's score for the film "Caravans" starring Anthony Quinn and based on the James Michener novel. The exact same ocarina that he had used for Morricone's iconic hit was later used on Katie Melua's "Nine Million Bicycles" international hit, written and arranged by Batt
