= James Shelton =

James Shelton may refer to:

- James A. Shelton (1916–1942), Navy Cross recipient
- Jim Shelton, head of the Chan Zuckerberg Initiative's education division
- Jim Shelton (footballer) (1897–1970), Australian rules footballer
- James Shelton (songwriter), Broadway composer, songwriter of "Lilac Wine" (1950)
- James Alan Shelton (1960–2014), American bluegrass guitarist
- James Shelton Dickinson (1818–1882), American politician
