= Pangea Recordings =

Electronic music record label

- Founded: 2001
- Country of origin: United States

Pangea Recordings is an electronic music record label that has featured releases from artists such as Joshua Collins, Chris Lake, Andy Moor, Mick Wilson, Nine Below Zero, and Subsky. They currently have two sublabels, 1 Shot Recordings and Pangea UK.

== See also ==
- List of record labels
