= Kon-Tiki (song) =

1961 single by the Shadows

Single by The Shadows
- B-side: "36-24-36"
- Released: 1 September 1961
- Recorded: 27 January 1961
- Studio: EMI Studios, London
- Genre: Instrumental surf
- Length: 1:51
- Label: Columbia
- Songwriter(s): Michael Carr
- Producer(s): Norrie Paramor

The Shadows singles chronology
"The Frightened City" (1961)	"Kon-Tiki" (1961)	"The Savage" (1961)

"Kon-Tiki" is an instrumental tune by British group the Shadows, released as a single in September 1961. It was the group's fifth hit and their second to top the UK Singles Chart.

== Background and release ==
"Kon-Tiki" was written by Michael Carr, who had previously written "Man of Mystery" for the group. It refers to the raft used by Norwegian explorer Thor Heyerdahl on his 1947 Kon-Tiki expedition. It was released with the B-side "36-24-36", which was written by the four Shadows members.

== Track listing ==
7": Columbia / DB 4698

1. "Kon-Tiki" – 1:51
2. "36-24-36" – 1:42

== Personnel ==
- Hank Marvin – electric lead guitar
- Bruce Welch – acoustic rhythm guitar
- Jet Harris – electric bass guitar
- Tony Meehan – drums

== Charts ==
Chart (1961–62)	Peak position
Australia (Kent Music Report)	4
Belgium (Ultratop 50 Wallonia)	35
France	7
Germany (GfK)	29
New Zealand (Lever Hit Parade)	5
Norway (VG-lista)	7
UK Singles (OCC)	1
