= Spider's Web (song) =

2006 single by Katie Melua

Single by Katie Melua

from the album Piece by Piece
- Released: 17 April 2006
- Length: 3:58
- Label: Dramatico
- Songwriter(s): Katie Melua
- Producer(s): Mike Batt

Katie Melua singles chronology
"I Cried for You" (2005)	"Spider's Web" (2006)	"It's Only Pain" (2006)

"Spider's Web" is the sixth single from Georgian-born singer Katie Melua's second studio album, Piece by Piece (2005). The title song was written during the lead up to the Iraq War and is said to be about finding the difference between right and wrong. The single was a bigger success in continental Europe than in Britain, where it reached number 52 on the UK Singles Chart. In the video for this single, there is a visual reference to Schindler's List.

== Track listings ==
1. "Spider's Web" (Katie Melua)
2. "Spider's Web" - live version
3. "Cry Baby Cry" (John Lennon, Paul McCartney)

== Personnel ==
- Vocals: Katie Melua
- Guitars: Katie Melua, Chris Spedding, Jim Cregan
- Piano: Mike Batt
- Bass: Tim Harries
- Drums: Henry Spinetti
- Solo Trumpet: Dominic Glover
- Solo violin: Mike Darcy
- Percussion: Martin Ditchman, Chris Karan
- Orchestra: The Irish Film Orchestra
- Conductor: Mike Batt

== Production ==
- Producers: Mike Batt
- Engineer: Steve Sale
- Arranger: Mike Batt

== Charts ==
Chart	Peak position
Belgium (Ultratip Bubbling Under Flanders)	16
Netherlands (Single Top 100)	50
Poland (Polish Airplay Charts)	2
Switzerland (Schweizer Hitparade)	54
