= Dorita y Pepe =

- Origin: London, England
- Genres: Latin American music, folk
- Years active: 1950s–1970s
- Past members: Peter Sensier; Dorothy Sensier (later Beck)

Dorita y Pepe were the stage names of British musicians Dorothy and Peter Sensier. They made many appearances as a duo on British television in the late 1950s and 1960s, performing Spanish and Latin American folk music, and released several albums. Peter Sensier was also known as a guitar maker, writer and radio broadcaster.

== Biography ==
Peter Sensier (20 January 1918 – 24 September 1977) was a Brentford-born musician who played guitar in jazz and swing bands, and became a friend of bandleader Edmundo Ros. He and Essex-born Joyce Dorothy Hamberger (26 September 1923 – December 2003) married in London in 1948. Peter Sensier was an accomplished classical and Spanish guitar player, and shared with his wife a love of Latin American music. They began performing as a duo in London clubs in the mid-1950s. By 1957, they had begun recording together as Dorita y Pepe, featuring on the EP Ken Sykora's Guitar Club Vol.2. She sang and played rhythm guitar.

The couple divorced in 1957 but maintained their professional relationship. Their first LP, Dorita y Pepe, was released on the Columbia label in 1961. They toured often in South America, and became popular there. They also performed in Russia, China, and elsewhere, and their music featured in the film Guns of Darkness (1962). They appeared regularly on BBC radio, in programmes including Guitar Club. In 1962-63, they featured in their own ITV television series, Their Kind of Music, and appeared many times during the 1960s on The Benny Hill Show. The duo's later albums included Viva Dorita y Pepe! (1964), En Buenos Aires (1965), and Latin American Folk (1968).

Peter Sensier was also known as a maker of guitars, vihuelas, charangos, tiples and other exotic instruments. Under his real name, he wrote articles for the BMG (Banjo, Mandolin, Guitar) magazine, and presented programmes on BBC Radio in the 1960s and 1970s, including a regular monthly programme, The Classical Guitar.

After her divorce from Peter Sensier, Dorothy was married to Philip Beck from 1958 until her death. Peter's first marriage, from 1939 to 1948, was to Lily Lewis.
