= Just like Heaven (The Cure song) =

1987 single by the Cure

"Just Like Heaven"

Single by the Cure

from the album Kiss Me, Kiss Me, Kiss Me
- B-side: "Snow in Summer"; "Sugar Girl"; "Breathe"; "A Chain of Flowers"
- Released: 5 October 1987
- Recorded: Studio Miraval, France, 1987
- Genre: Gothic rock; post-punk; new wave; pop
- Length: 3:32
- Label: Fiction
- Composers: Robert Smith; Simon Gallup; Porl Thompson; Boris Williams; Lol Tolhurst
- Lyricist: Robert Smith
- Producers: David M. Allen; Robert Smith

The Cure singles chronology
"Catch" (1987)	"Just Like Heaven" (1987)	"Hot Hot Hot!!!" (1988)

Video
- "Just Like Heaven" on YouTube

"Just Like Heaven" is a song by English rock band the Cure. The group wrote most of the song during recording sessions in southern France in 1987. The lyrics were written by their frontman Robert Smith, who drew inspiration from a past trip to the sea shore with his future wife. Smith's memories of the trip formed the basis for the song's accompanying music video. Before Smith had completed the lyrics, an instrumental version of the song was used as the theme for the French television show Les Enfants du Rock.

"Just Like Heaven" was the third single released from their 1987 album Kiss Me, Kiss Me, Kiss Me. The song became the Cure's first American hit and reached number 40 on the Billboard charts in 1988. It has been praised by critics and covered by artists such as Dinosaur Jr. and Katie Melua. Smith has said he considers "Just Like Heaven" to be one of the band's strongest songs.

== Background and recording ==
In order to develop material for Kiss Me, Kiss Me, Kiss Me, Smith forced himself to write music for 15 days of each month. During this regimen, he developed the chords and melody which form the basis of "Just Like Heaven". Structurally, Smith found what he had written was similar to the Only Ones's 1979 hit "Another Girl, Another Planet". When he brought an instrumental demo of the song to the album recording sessions in Southern France, Cure drummer Boris Williams increased the tempo and added an opening drum fill which inspired Smith to introduce each instrument singularly and in sequence.

When the French TV show Les Enfants du Rock asked the Cure to provide a theme song, Smith offered the instrumental version. As he explained, "It meant the music would be familiar to millions of Europeans even before it was released". He completed the lyrics when the group moved the sessions to Studio Miraval, located in Le Val, Provence-Alpes-Côte d'Azur. The band completed the song quickly, and at the time Smith considered it to be the most obvious potential single from the songs the band had recorded during their two-week stay at Miraval.

== Composition and lyrics ==
"Just Like Heaven"
Sample of "Just Like Heaven", taken from the Cure's 1987 album Kiss Me, Kiss Me, Kiss Me. The song's guitar riff appears briefly as Robert Smith sings the lines, "That stole the only girl I loved/And drowned her deep inside of me."

"Just Like Heaven" is written in the key of A major and consists of an A–E–Bm–D chord progression which repeats throughout the song, except during the chorus when the band plays an F♯m–G–D progression. The song's central hook is formed from a descending guitar riff which appears between song verses and in parts of the bridge and the last verse. This guitar line contrasts with the "fuzzier mix" of the rhythm guitars.

According to Smith, "The song is about hyperventilating—kissing and fainting to the floor." The lyrics were inspired by a trip with his then-girlfriend (and later wife) Mary Poole to Beachy Head in southern England. Smith said the opening line of the song ("Show me, show me, show me how you do that trick") refers to his childhood memories of mastering magic tricks, but added "on another [level], it's about a seduction trick, from much later in my life".

== Reception ==
"Just Like Heaven" was the third single released from the band's Kiss Me Kiss Me Kiss Me album. Melody Maker's review of the single was undecided; writer David Stubbs described it as "a colourful, fluttery, fussy thing" and "unimpeachable", but added, "[it] turns my face green, as if having consumed too many truffles." The song was the Cure's eleventh top 40 hit in the UK, and stayed on the charts there for five weeks during October and November 1987, peaking at number 29. In the United States, "Just Like Heaven" became the Cure's first top 40 hit when it reached number 40 on the Billboard Hot 100 for one week in December 1987.

Stephen Thomas Erlewine of AllMusic said "the stately 'Just Like Heaven' [...] is remarkable and helps make the album [Kiss Me, Kiss Me, Kiss Me] one of the group's very best". Ned Raggett, also of AllMusic, wrote that the song was "instantly memorable, [and] sparkling with rough energy [...] it's a perfect showcase for Robert Smith's ear for wistful, romantic numbers. His main guitar line, a descending, gently chiming melody, contrasts perfectly against the fuzzier mix of the rhythm guitars, while Simon Gallup's bass and Boris Williams' strong, immediate drums make for a great introduction to the track." Barry Walsh of Slant magazine said the Cure "...is at the top of its game [...] on the simply stellar 'Just Like Heaven'. Glistening descending guitar lines, Gallup's throbbing bass line, and Williams' authoritative thumping frame a typically lovelorn Smith lyric, with the end result being one of the Cure's finest singles, and perhaps one of the best pop singles of the late '80s."

Although the later singles "Lovesong" and "Friday I'm in Love" reached higher chart positions, "Just Like Heaven" was the band's American breakthrough, and has been described as "in American terms, at least, the one Cure song everyone seems to know." The song inspired the name of, and was used in the 2005 film Just Like Heaven. In 2004, Rolling Stone magazine ranked it number 483 on their list of the "500 Greatest Songs of All Time", number 488 in 2010, and number 108 in 2021. In 2005, Entertainment Weekly ranked "Just Like Heaven" 25th on its list of "The 50 Greatest Love Songs", saying, "Turns out guys who wear black eyeliner can be happy." The following year the song placed at number 22 on VH1's poll "100 Greatest Songs of the 80s". In 2019, Billboard ranked the song number one on their list of the 40 greatest Cure songs, and in 2023, Mojo ranked the song number four on their list of the 30 greatest Cure songs.

Robert Smith said he considers "Just Like Heaven" to be one of the band's strongest works, and called it "the best pop song the Cure have ever done". Several high-profile fans have expressed their appreciation of the song. Musician Ben Folds told Blender "everything about it—the songwriting, the music—is state of the art. It's as good as it gets. Anytime I hear it on the radio or a mix tape, I jump around like a freak." J Mascis said his band Dinosaur Jr.'s affection for the song inspired them to record a cover version that was released in 1989. On 16 July 2006, "Just Like Heaven" was played as a wake-up call for the crew of Space Shuttle Discovery on their flight STS-121 at the request of astronaut Piers Sellers' family; Sellers told mission control centre that the song reminded him of "the wild, happy, beer-drinking years of my youth." Brandon Flowers, frontman of American rock band The Killers, credits the song for kickstarting his love of British music in the 1980s, and influencing his early work.

== Music video ==
Robert Smith and Roger O'Donnell (background) in the music video shot in studio to replicate the cliffs of Beachy Head in reference to the song's lyrics.

The music video for "Just Like Heaven" was directed by Tim Pope, who had directed all of the band's previous videos since 1982's "Let's Go to Bed". The video was filmed in England's Pinewood Studios in October 1987. Set on a cliff overlooking a sea, the video recreates many of the memories detailed in the song's lyrics. When a fanzine asked Smith what the song was about, he said it was inspired by "something that happened to me a long time ago—see the video!" While Smith had claimed for years that the video was shot at the same place that inspired the song, he later admitted that the bulk of it was filmed in a studio, utilising footage of the water and cliffs of Beachy Head taken for the band's 1985 video for "Close to Me".

During the song's piano solo the sky turns to nighttime and the band is shown clad in white shirts. Mary Poole appears in this sequence as a woman dressed in white dancing with Smith. As Smith explained, "Mary dances with me in the video because she was the girl [in the song], so it had to be her." Pope later commented, "[Poole] can honestly lay claim to being the only featured female in any Cure video, ever."

== Cover versions ==
A number of cover versions of "Just Like Heaven" have been released, including recordings in Spanish, French, and German.

Robert Smith's personal favourite is the cover recorded by American alternative rock band Dinosaur Jr., which was released as a single in the UK in 1989 (and 1990 in the US). Dinosaur Jr.'s version has a faster tempo and showcases the band's loud and distortion-heavy sound. The band's frontman J Mascis explained, "We recorded it for a compilation album, but when we finished it we liked it so much we didn't want to give it to them." Smith said, "J Mascis sent me a cassette, and it was so passionate. It was fantastic. I've never had such a visceral reaction to a cover version before or since", and even said the cover has "influenced how we play it live". Dinosaur Jr.'s cover reached No. 78 on the UK Singles Chart.

Katie Melua recorded a cover for the 2005 film of the same name, Just Like Heaven, which also appeared on her 2005 album Piece by Piece. In the UK, the cover was released as a double A-side single with "I Cried for You" in late 2005, which became a minor adult contemporary radio hit in the US in 2006.

Olivia Rodrigo performed a live version of the song with Smith during the 2025 edition of the Glastonbury Festival. The live version was later released as a double single along with Rodrigo's version of "Friday I'm in Love" with both songs included on the live album of her Glastonbury set. The single reached number one on the UK Physical Singles Chart. During the performance, Rodrigo wore a T-shirt that read "You know all the words to 'Just Like Heaven'," teasing her subsequent release of "Drop Dead," which includes that lyric and has Rodrigo relate to the feelings expressed through the song after meeting a man she finds herself attracted to.

== Track listing ==
7" – Fiction / Fics 27 (UK)

1. "Just Like Heaven" [edited remix] (3:17)
2. "Snow in Summer" (3:26)

7" – Polydor / 887-104-7 (FR)

1. "Just Like Heaven" [Remix] (3:17)
2. "Snow in Summer" (3:26)

7" – Elektra / 7 69443 (US)

1. "Just Like Heaven" [edited remix] (3:17)
2. "Breathe" (4:47)

7" – Polydor / 887 104-7 (FR)

1. "Just Like Heaven" (3:17)
2. "Breathe" (4:47)

12" – Fiction / Ficsx 27 (UK)

1. "Just Like Heaven" [remix] (3:29)
2. "Snow in Summer" (3:26)
3. "Sugar Girl" (3:14)
- also released on CD Fixcd 27

12" – Elektra / 0 66793 (US)

1. "Just Like Heaven" [remix] (3:29)
2. "Breathe" (4:47)
3. "A Chain of Flowers" (4:55)

== Charts ==
1987–1988 weekly chart performance for "Just Like Heaven"
Chart (1987–1988)	Peak position
Australia (Kent Music Report)	89
French Singles Chart	33
Irish Singles Chart	15
Dutch Top 100	82
New Zealand Singles Chart	31
Spain (AFYVE)	25
UK Singles (Official Charts)	29
US Billboard Hot 100	40
US Billboard Hot Dance Music/Club Play	28
US Billboard Hot Dance Music/Maxi-Singles Sales	27

== Certifications ==
Certifications and sales for "Just Like Heaven"
Region	Certification	Certified units/sales
Denmark (IFPI Danmark)	Gold	45,000^{‡}
Italy (FIMI)	Gold	50,000^{‡}
New Zealand (RMNZ)	2× Platinum	60,000^{‡}
Spain (Promusicae)	Gold	30,000^{‡}
United Kingdom (BPI)	2× Platinum	1,200,000^{‡}
^{‡} Sales+streaming figures based on certification alone.
