= Wout Steenhuis =

- Born: Wouter Jan Jelmer Steenhuis; 23 February 1923; The Hague, Netherlands
- Died: 9 July 1985 (aged 62) Broadstairs, Kent, England
- Genres: Jazz, Hawaiian Music. Exotica, Easy Listening
- Occupation: Musician
- Instruments: Guitar, Banjo, Ukulele
- Years active: 1943-1985

Wout Steenhuis (23 February 1923 – 9 July 1985) was a Dutch multi-instrumentalist.

== Biography ==
Steenhuis was born in The Hague, Netherlands. As a student in occupied Holland he listened to black market jazz records - banned by the Germans as "decadent" - every day, using "illegal" equipment centered around a radio glued under a bookshelf which he used as an amplifier. He helped to found the famous Dutch Swing College Band in 1943, played his guitar at secret parties, and moved into a flat with Peter Schilperoort, the band's leader, to start on the road to becoming one of the country's top jazz musicians. He had originally planned to pursue a science degree, but, in 1940, the Germans forbade him going to university because his father was in England. He became active in the Dutch Resistance and was captured by the Germans in December 1944 and sent to a concentration camp at Amersfoort. He was among a lorry load of prisoners condemned to death when he escaped by leaping over the side, running across a minefield, and hiding in a wood. Soon he was back with the resistance near his home town.

In May 1945, the day before the liberation of the Netherlands, Steenhuis's right elbow was shattered by a bullet in a battle with the Germans. He was unconscious for 4 days and awoke in a British military hospital to find that his arm had been set in such a way that he could never again play the guitar. Eventually he cajoled the busy surgeon into breaking the arm again and re-setting it so that he could return to music when he was discharged from the hospital.

In March 1946 he rejoined the Dutch Swing College Band, succeeding Otto Gobius as guitarist. His second tenure with the group was short-lived as he left the band in 1948 and relocated to England with his fiancé Leona to join his father as co-director of a fruit preserving business on the Kent coast. Steenhuis took over this post from his father but remained active as a guitarist. One of the unique features of his playing was that of his multi-tracking system whereby he played all the fretted instruments heard on record and on stage. All the backing instruments were recorded separately at his home studio and then put together.

Steenhuis' music was relegated to the position of a hobby until, encouraged by his wife, he sent some of his recordings to the BBC where they caught the interest of a radio producer, which led to him making his debut broadcast in 'Guitar Club'. After that Steenhuis appeared on several radio programmes (including Breakfast Special, Open House, Charlie Chester and Easy Beat) and hosted a radio program Quarter Wout Steenhuis on the offshore station Radio Veronica.

In 1963 he signed a recording contract with Denis Preston of Lansdowne Recording Studios and all his recordings then appeared on Columbia, Studio 2 and EMI labels. From 1962-63 he appeared on Southern Television in the series 'Three of a Kind' and 'Their Kind of Music' alongside popular duo Dorita y Pepe. On earlier albums Wout was backed by The Kontikis - a name given to his own backing of multi-tracked instruments. On later albums however, due to the expansion of orchestration, it became a lengthy and laborious job to play all the instruments himself so The Kontikis were made up of session musicians including Herbie Flowers / Tony Campo (bass), Alan Parker / Dick Abel (guitar) and Clem Cattini / Barry Morgan (drums) with Wout playing the main melody parts himself.

In addition to being a guitar virtuoso he was also a prolific composer. Under the pen name of Jelmer he is credited for such titles as Hawaiian Chimes, Blue Dolphin, Malihini March, Bora Bora, Lazy Guitar and Aroha Hawaii. The latter he sang in Maori. He also co-wrote Stop, a 1966 single released by Giorgio Moroder.

Wout Steenhuis continued to perform up until his death from cancer in 1985.

He was an active member of the community in the Isle of Thanet and was the founder of the Margate branch of the Round Table Club setting up links with a similar club in Vlaardingen near Rotterdam in Holland.
