= The Closest Thing to Crazy =

2003 single by Katie Melua

Single by Katie Melua

from the album Call Off the Search
- Released: 1 December 2003
- Length: 4:11
- Label: Dramatico
- Songwriter: Mike Batt
- Producer: Mike Batt

Katie Melua singles chronology
| "The Closest Thing to Crazy" (2003) | "Call Off the Search" (2004) |

Music video
- "The Closest Thing to Crazy" on YouTube

"The Closest Thing to Crazy" a song by Georgian-born singer Katie Melua, released as her debut single on 1 December 2003. It is included on her first studio album, Call Off the Search (2003). The song was written as part of the musical Men Who March Away, and appeared first in 1995 on Mike Batt's album Arabesque.

The single was originally due out in January 2004 but was released a month early in an attempt by Terry Wogan to make it that year's Christmas number one in the United Kingdom; it stalled at number 10 on the UK Singles Chart. However, owing to the success of the album reaching number one, the song climbed back into the top 20 during January and February and resulted in Melua's first nomination for the annual Record of the Year prize on ITV1. At the end of 2004, due to its longevity on the UK chart, the song came in at number 77 on the year-end ranking, making it the lowest-charting song to finish within the top 100 for that year.

== Composition and lyrics ==
The song is played in the key of E major at a tempo of 64 beats per minute. The vocal range is G♯_{3} to C♯_{5}. It has an irregular meter with a mix of 4/4, 3/4, and 2/4.

The lyrics of the song take the form of a series of rhetorical questions, describing the contradictory emotions of being in love. It appears that the object of the singer's love treats the singer unkindly, and may not return the emotion.

== Track listings ==
UK CD single 1

1. "The Closest Thing to Crazy" (Mike Batt)
2. "Faraway Voice" (Katie Melua)
3. "I Think It's Going to Rain" (Randy Newman)

UK CD single 2

1. "The Closest Thing to Crazy" (Batt)
2. "Downstairs to the Sun" (Melua)
3. "Thank You, Stars" (Batt)
4. "The Closest Thing to Crazy" (video)

European CD single

1. "The Closest Thing to Crazy" (Batt)
2. "Downstairs to the Sun" (Melua)
3. "The Closest Thing to Crazy" (video)

Australian CD single

1. "The Closest Thing to Crazy" (Batt)
2. "Downstairs to the Sun" (Melua)
3. "Thank You, Stars" (Batt)

== Personnel ==
- Katie Melua – guitar, vocals
- Mike Batt – organ, piano, conductor
- Jim Cregan – guitar
- Tim Harries – bass
- Irish Film Orchestra – orchestra
- Michael Kruk – drums
- Alan Smale – leader
- Chris Spedding – guitar
- Henry Spinetti – drums
- Mike Batt – producer
- Steve Sale – engineer
- Mike Batt – arranger

== Charts ==
=== Weekly charts ===
| Chart (2003–2004) | Peak position |
|---|---|
| Australia (ARIA) | 45 |
| Germany (GfK) | 49 |
| Ireland (IRMA) | 8 |
| Netherlands (Single Top 100) | 41 |
| Norway (VG-lista) | 15 |
| Scottish Singles Sales (Official Charts) | 10 |
| UK Singles (Official Charts) | 10 |
| UK Indie (Official Charts) | 1 |

=== Year-end charts ===
| Chart (2003) | Position |
|---|---|
| UK Singles (OCC) | 152 |
| Chart (2004) | Position |
| UK Singles (OCC) | 77 |

== Certifications ==
| Region | Certification | Certified units/sales |
|---|---|---|
| Denmark (IFPI Danmark) | Gold | 4,000^{^} |
| United Kingdom (BPI) | Silver | 200,000^{‡} |
^{^} Shipments figures based on certification alone.^{‡} Sales+streaming figures based on certification alone.

== Release history ==
| Region | Date | Format(s) | Label(s) | Ref. |
|---|---|---|---|---|
| United Kingdom | 1 December 2003 | CD | Dramatico | |
| United States | 3 May 2004 | Adult contemporary radio | Dramatico | |
| United States | 10 May 2004 | Triple A radio | Dramatico | |
