= Justin Sandercoe =

Australian guitarist (b. 1974)

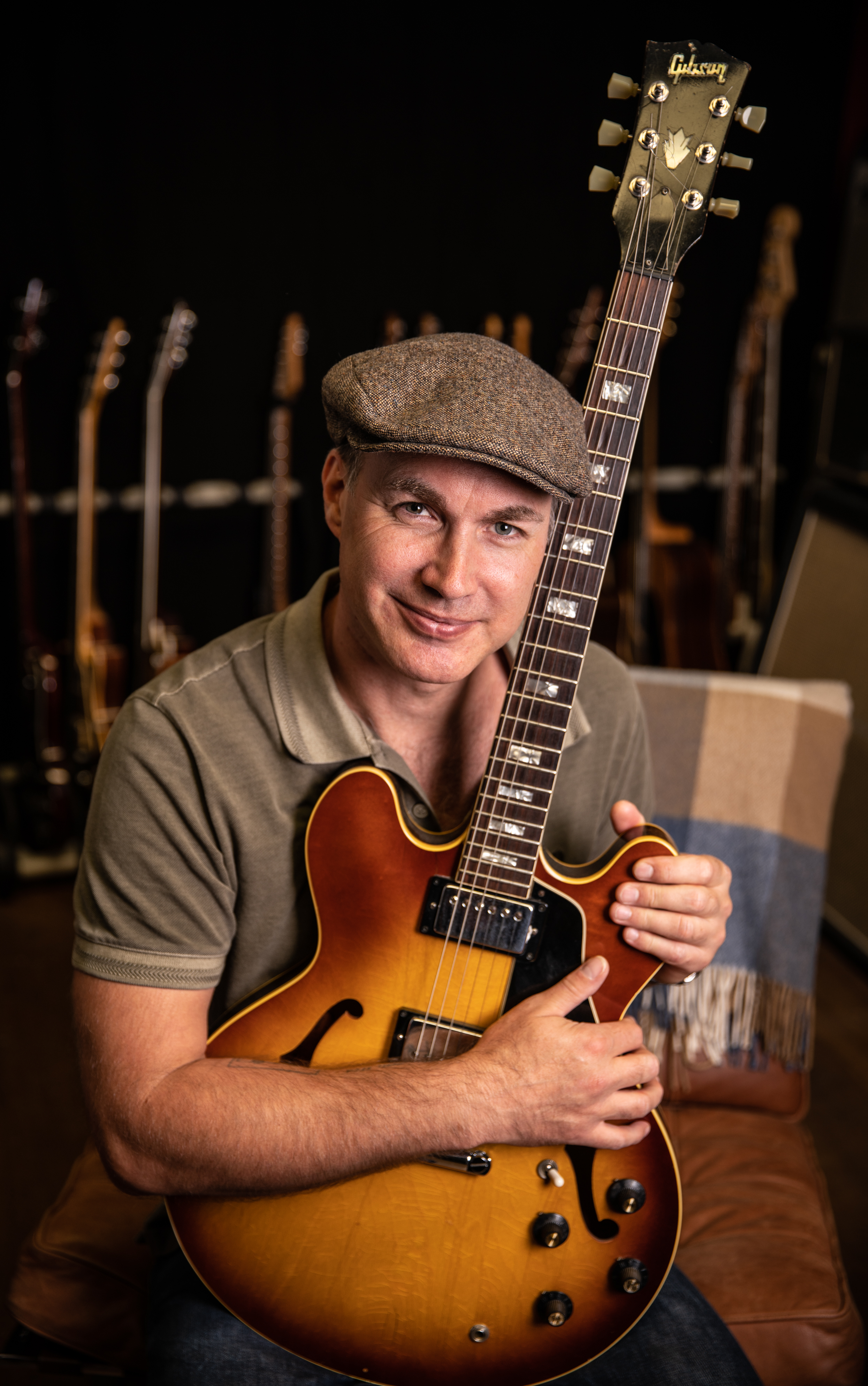
Sandercoe in 2020

Justin Sandercoe (born 27 March 1974) is an Australian guitarist, songwriter, performer, producer and educator. He was born and raised in Tasmania. He has been based in London, England since 1996.

== Teaching website background ==
Sandercoe's official website JustinGuitar was first launched on 31 July 2003, offering lessons as a sample to promote private one-on-one lessons. The site developed a modest following but once he began making instructional guitar videos for YouTube in December 2006, the site became one of the most popular guitar instruction web sites.

His videos on YouTube received 100 million views in August 2011, and on 20 July 2019 he reached 1,000,000 subscribers on the platform. The site runs on voluntary donations and purchases of products from the store from users and there are no fees for membership.

Sandercoe was named as one of the UK's Top 10 YouTube Celebrities on The Telegraph Newspaper and The Independent newspaper called him "one of the most influential guitar teachers in history" and he has received recommendations from guitarists like Brian May.

In 2007 he started Chocolate Cake Productions with friend Jed Wardley to release his instructional DVDs. By June 2012 there are 11 DVDs available, including "Master The Major Scale", "Really Useful Strumming Techniques", a "Solo Blues Guitar" series, "The JustinGuitar Beginner's Course" and "Intermediate Method". Sandercoe also publishes a number of electronic books in .pdf format, including "Practical Music Theory", "The Chord Construction Guide" and "Understanding Rhythm Notation", as well as an ongoing series of instructional songbooks, to which entries include the Vintage Songbook, the Rock Songbook, the Pop Songbook, and the Acoustic Songbook.

== Performing with Katie Melua ==
Sandercoe has produced and written for Katie Melua and played electric and acoustic guitar in her live band between 2005 and 2008.

Her performance of his song "Turn To Tell" was available as the B-side on the "Call Off The Search" UK single. The song can also be heard on the South African release of the album "Call Off The Search", which earned Sandercoe his first platinum disc. He is also featured in the video clip of the same song, found on the bonus DVD of the UK album release.

He taught Melua guitar.

== Live performances ==
Sandercoe has played concerts around the world with a variety of acts, including The Brit Awards 2004; The Johnny Vaughn house band 2005; live on the Today Show in the United States in 2006; the UK and European tour with Melua in 2006 & 2007 which included The World Music Awards, the Live Earth Concert in Hamburg, the North Sea Jazz Festival in Rotterdam and the German ECHO awards.

Between 2000 and 2005 he played over 1000 shows with The Counterfeit Stones—a Rolling Stones tribute band—including supporting Bryan Adams at the Amsterdam Arena in Amsterdam, a sold out Albert Hall show, The Shepherds Bush Empire and numerous television and radio appearances.

== Magazines ==
Sandercoe has been featured and written for Guitar Techniques magazine, and his popular column Food For Thought has been running since 2015. He also wrote the Led Zeppelin cover feature (issue GT108) and the Tasty Chord column. He has also been featured in Total Guitar and in Guitar magazine, with The Counterfeit Stones. He has been published in Guitar Tutor, the magazine of the Registry Of Guitar Tutors, and has instructed masterclasses about teaching transcribing at their annual conference. He has also given masterclasses for The Institute of Contemporary Music Performance and The International Guitar Federation.

== We Came As Strangers ==
Sandercoe was a founding member of the ongoing British rock / folk / avant garde group We Came As Strangers, along with vocalist Ellem, keyboardist Owen Thomas, bass player Tim Harries, and drummer Tom Meadows. The band has released three albums, Recipe for Adventure, Shattered Matter, and their latest, Eyedom, on 31 August 2015.

== Discography ==
Solo

- Small Town Eyes (2010)

with We Came As Strangers

- Recipe For Adventure (2013)
- Shattered Matter (2014)
- Eyedom (2015)
