= Bert Weedon =

English guitarist (1920–2012)

Bert Weedon OBE

Background information
- Born: Herbert Maurice William Weedon; 10 May 1920; East Ham, Essex, England
- Died: 20 April 2012 (aged 91) Beaconsfield, Buckinghamshire, England
- Genres: Jazz, blues, pop
- Occupations: Musician, guitarist
- Instrument: Guitar
- Years active: 1939–2012
- Labels: Dansan Records; Parlophone; Top Rank; His Master's Voice; Fontana; Grosvenor; Polydor
- Website: http://www.bertweedon.com

Herbert Maurice William Weedon (10 May 1920 – 20 April 2012) was an English guitarist whose style of playing was popular and influential during the 1950s and 1960s. He was the first British guitarist to have a hit record in the UK singles chart, in 1959, and his best-selling tutorial, Play in a Day, was a major influence on many leading British musicians, such as Eric Clapton, Brian May and Paul McCartney. He was awarded an OBE in 2001 for services to music.

== Biography ==
Weedon was born in Burges Road, East Ham, Essex (now part of the London Borough of Newham). He began learning classical guitar at the age of 12, and decided to become a professional musician. In his teens during the 1930s, he led groups such as the Blue Cumberland Rhythm Boys, and Bert Weedon and His Harlem Hotshots, before making his first solo appearance at East Ham Town Hall in 1939. He worked with leading performers including Stephane Grappelli and George Shearing, and performed with various big bands and orchestras, including those of Ted Heath and Mantovani.

He joined the BBC Show Band directed by Cyril Stapleton in the 1950s, when he began to be featured as a soloist. He also worked as a session musician on many early British rock and roll and other records for artists such as Marty Wilde, Tommy Steele, Billy Fury, Adam Faith and Kenny Lynch, and worked as an accompanist to visiting American singers such as Frank Sinatra, Judy Garland and Nat King Cole. It is estimated that he performed on over 5,000 BBC Radio broadcasts. He was also seen regularly on British television in the 1950s, including some of the most popular children's television programmes. In 1959 he was asked by Top Rank Records to make a record as a solo guitarist. He became the first British guitarist in the UK singles chart, with "Guitar Boogie Shuffle" in 1959, and was cited as an influence by many stars, including Eric Clapton, Brian May, Paul McCartney, George Harrison, John Lennon, Pete Townshend, Keith Richards, Sting, Hank Marvin, Robert Smith, Mike Oldfield, Mark Knopfler and Jimmy Page.

As well as his hits and TV appearances at a crucial time in modern music history, Weedon's best-known contribution to British guitar style is his tutorial guide Play in a Day, first published in 1957, which many stars claim was a major influence on their learning and playing. It sold over one million copies. He also wrote a follow-up, Play Every Day. His playing style focused on both rhythm and melody, and was influenced by the jazz guitarists of the 1950s, notably Les Paul. Weedon placed a lot of emphasis on control of tone, and wanted to make the guitar the star of his music. The style became best known through the music of the Shadows, especially Hank Marvin. The Bonzo Dog Doo-Dah Band mentioned Weedon in their song "We are Normal" on their album, The Doughnut in Granny's Greenhouse (1969). In November 1976, Weedon made number one, for one week, in the UK Albums Chart with 22 Golden Guitar Greats, a compilation album of guitar solos released on the Warwick label.

McCartney commented: "George and I went through the Bert Weedon books and learned D and A together." According to Clapton, "I wouldn't have felt the urge to press on without the tips and encouragement Bert's book gives you. I've never met a player of any consequence that doesn't say the same thing." Brian May stated: "There's not a guitarist in Britain from my generation who doesn't owe him a great debt of gratitude."

== Personal life ==
Married to Maggie Weedon, he had two sons, Lionel and Geoffrey, eight grandchildren (including Tors members Matt and Theo), and a great-grandson. As a Water Rat, Weedon was highly active in charity work and fundraising, especially for children and disabled people, and was elected King Rat in 1992. He was awarded an OBE in 2001 for his services to music. Weedon died on 20 April 2012, aged 91, following a long illness.

== Legacy ==
Neville Marten, editor of Guitar Techniques magazine, commented that Bert Weedon's contribution to the guitar world cannot be overstated: "With 'students' that number Eric Clapton, Brian May, Sting, Pete Townshend, John Lennon, Paul McCartney, and countless others, Weedon could well be described as the most genuinely influential guitarist of all time." The ARSC also noted that Weedon had been a big influence on Mike Oldfield. In 1999, Weedon performed at the Pipeline Instrumental Rock Convention in London.

== Discography ==
=== Chart singles ===
Year	Single	Chart Positions
Year	Single	UK
1959	"Guitar Boogie Shuffle"	10
1959	"Nashville Boogie"	29
1960	"Big Beat Boogie"	37
1960	"Twelfth Street Rag"	47
1960	"Apache"	24
1960	"Sorry Robbie"	28
1961	"Ginchy"	35
1961	"Mr Guitar"	47

=== Releases ===
==== Albums (Top Rank label) ====
- BUY026: Kingsize Guitar
- 35/101: Honky Tonk Guitar

Fontana 6438 031 Rockin' at the Roundhouse 1970

==== Singles (all labels) ====
- DB 3264: "April in Paris" / "Everything I Have Is Yours" ["With Max Jaffa"] 78 (Columbia: 1953)
- DB 3343: "Dancing Duck" / "Golden Violins" ["With Max Jaffa"] 78 (1953)
- DB 3484: "Petite Ballerina" / "Sally" ["With Max Jaffa"] 78 (1954)
- R 4113: "Stranger Than Fiction" / "China Boogie" 78 (Parlophone: 1956)
- R 4178: "The Boy with the Magic Guitar" / "Flannel Foot" 78 (1957)
- R 4256: "Theme From ITV’s 64,000 Question" / "Twilight Time" 78 (1957)
- R 4315: "Soho Fair" / "Jolly Gigolo" 78 (1957)
- R 4381: "Play That Big Guitar" / "Quiet Quiet Shh!" 78 (1957)
- R 4446: "Big Note Blues" / "Rippling Tango" 78 (1958)
- SAG 2906: "Fifi" / "Cat on a Hot Tin Roof" ["As The Rag Pickers"] 78 (Saga: 1959)
- JAR-117: "Guitar Boogie Shuffle" / "Bert's Boogie" 7"/78 (Top Rank: 1959)
- JAR-121: "Sing Little Birdie – Quickstep" / "The Lady is a Tramp – Quickstep" 7"/78 (1959)
- JAR-122: "Petite Fleur – Slow Foxtrot" / "My Happiness – Slow Foxtrot" 7"/78 (1959)
- JAR-123: "Charmaine – Waltz" / "It's Time to Say Goodnight – Waltz" 7"/78 (1959)
- JAR-136: "Teenage Guitar" / "Blue Guitar" 7"/78 (1959)
- JAR-210: "Jealousy – Tango / "Tango Tango" 7"/78 (1959)
- JAR-211: "Stardust – Slow Foxtrot" / "Summertime – Slow Foxtrot" 7"/78 (1959)
- JAR-221: "Nashville Boogie" / "King Size Guitar" 7"/78 (1959)
- JAR-300/TRS-1523: "Big Beat Boogie" / "Theme from a Summer Place" 7" (1960)
- JAR-360: "Twelfth Street Rag" / "Querida" 7" (1960)
- JAR-415: "Apache" / "Lonely Guitar" 7" (1960)
- JAR-517: "Sorry Robbie" / "Easy Beat" 7" (1960)
- JAR-537: "Ginchy" / "Yearning" 7" (1961)
- JAR-559: "Mr Guitar" / "Eclipse" 7" (1961)
- JAR-582: "Ghost Train" / "Fury" 7" (1961)
- JKP3008: "Weedon Winners" EP
- POP 946: "China Doll" / "Red Guitar" 7" (His Master's Voice: 1961)
- POP 989: "Twist A Napoli" / "Twist Me Pretty Baby" 7" (1962)
- POP 1043: "Some Other Love" / "Tune For Two" 7" (1962)
- POP 1077: "South of the Border" / "Poinciana 7 (1962)
- POP 1141: "Night Cry" / "Charlie Boy" 7" (1963)
- POP 1216: "Dark Eyes" / "Black Jackets" 7" (1963)
- POP 1248: "It Happened in Monterey" / "Lonely Nights" 7" (1964)
- POP 1302: "Gin Mill Guitar" / "Can’t Help Falling in Love 7" (1964)
- POP 1355: "Tokyo Melody" / "Theme From 'Limelight'" 7" (1964)
- POP 1381: "Twelve String Shuffle" / "Colour Him Folky" 7" (1965)
- POP 1485: "High Stepping" / "East Meets West" 7" (1965)
- POP 1535: "Kick Off" / "MacGregor’s Leap" 7" (1966)
- POP 1592: "Stranger Than Fiction" / "Malaguena" 7" (1967)
- 6007 012: "Rockin' At The Roundhouse" / "40 Miles of Bad Road" 7" (Polydor: 1970)
- GRS 1015: "Watch Your Step" / "Safe and Sound" ["As The Bert Weedon Quartet with Roy Edwards Vocal"] 7" (Grosvenor: 1972)
- 2058 832: "Rocking Guitar: (a) Guitar Boogie Shuffle/(b) See You Later Alligator/(c) What’d I Say/(d) Shake Rattle and Roll/ (e) Blue Suede Shoes/ (d) Rock Around The Clock" [medley] / "Bella Ciao" 7" (Polydor: 1977)
- 2058 891: "Blue Echoes" / "Romance" 7" (Polydor: 1977)
- ACS2: "Kisses in Spring" / "Plaisir D’amour" 7" (Celebrity: ND)
- OOSP 405: "Theme From Gallipoli" / "Blue Echoes" 7" (Polydor: 1977)
- POSP 41: "Cavatina" / "Song for Anna" ["As Savillia"] 7" (Polydor: 1979)
