= The Wombles discography =

- Studio albums: 5
- Soundtrack albums: 1
- Compilation albums: 11
- Singles: 15

The Wombles were a British novelty pop group, featuring musicians dressed as the characters from the children's TV show The Wombles, which in turn was based on the children's book series by Elisabeth Beresford. Their music was composed by Mike Batt, producing 6 albums and many more singles.

== Albums ==
=== Studio albums ===
List of studio albums, with selected chart positions
Title	Album details	Peak chart positions
Title	Album details	UK
Wombling Songs	Released: February 1974; Label: CBS (65803)	19
Remember You're a Womble	Released: July 1974; Label: CBS (80191)	18
Keep On Wombling	Released: December 1974; Label: CBS (80526)	17
Superwombling	Released: 19 September 1975; Label: CBS (80997)	—
Wombling Free	Released: 1978; Label: CBS	—

=== Soundtrack albums ===
Title	Album details
Wombling Free	Released: 1978; Label: CBS

=== Compilation albums ===
List of charting compilation albums, with selected chart positions
Title	Album details	Peak chart positions
Title	Album details	UK
The Wombles	Released: 1974; Label: CBS (66323)	—
The Best of The Wombles – 20 Wombling Greats	Released: 1975; Label: CBS (5022)	29
The Best of The Wombles – 20 Wombling Greats (reissue)	Released: 1976; Label: Warwick/CBS	—
The Wombles Christmas Party	Released: 1978; Label: SHM (977)	—
The Wombles Christmas Album	Released: 1983; Label: CBS (25805)	—
Wombling Hits	Released: 1989; Label: CBS (466118 1)	—
Underground, Overground – The Ultimate Wombles Collection	Released: 1997; Label: RDCD (2181–2)	—
The Best Wombles Album So Far - Volume One	Released: 16 March 1998; Label: Columbia (489562 4)	26
The Wombles Collection	Released: 20 November 2000; Label: Dramatico (DRAMCD0001)	—
The Very Best of the Wombles	Released: 3 October 2005; Label: Columbia (504418 2)	—
The W Factor	Released: 28 November 2011; Label: Dramatico (B0062JIBLS)	—

== Singles ==
List of charting singles, with selected chart positions
Year	Song	Peak chart Positions							Album
Year	Song	UK	AUS	CAN	GER	IRL	NZ	US	Album
1973	"The Wombling Song" / "Wombles Everywhere"	4	51	81	—	12	5	—	Wombling Songs
1974	"Remember You're a Womble" / "Bungo's Birthday" (from Wombling Songs)	3	—	—	22	6	—	—	Remember You're a Womble
1974	"Banana Rock" / "The Womble Square Dance"	9	—	—	45	10	—	—	Remember You're a Womble
1974	"Wombling Summer Party" / "Wimbledon Sunset"	—	—	70	—	—	—	55	Remember You're a Womble
1974	"Minuetto Allegretto" / "Womble Burrow Boogie"	16	—	—	—	—	—	—	Remember You're a Womble
1974	"Remember You're A Womble" / "Wellington Womble" (from Wombling Songs)	3	—	—	22	6	—	—	Remember You're a Womble
1974	"Wombling Merry Christmas" / "Madame Cholet (from Wombling Songs)"	2	—	—	—	—	—	—	Keep On Wombling
1975	"Wombling White Tie and Tails" / "The Wombling Twist" (from Keep On Wombling)	22	—	—	—	—	—	—	Superwombling
1975	"Super Womble" / "The Orinoco Kid" (from Keep On Wombling)	20	—	—	—	—	—	—	Superwombling
1975	"Let's Womble to the Party Tonight" / "Down At The Barber Shop"	34	—	—	—	—	—	—	20 Wombling Greats
1976	"The Womble Shuffle" / "To Wimbledon With Love"	—	—	—	—	—	—	—	Superwombling
1998	"Remember You're a Womble" (re-release) / "Remember You're A Womble (Dance Mix)"	13	—	—	—	—	—	—	The Best Wombles Album So Far - Volume One
1998	"The Wombling Song" (Underground version) / "The Orinoco Kid"	27	—	—	—	—	—	—	Non-album single
2000	"I Wish It Could Be a Wombling Christmas" (with Roy Wood) / "Wombling USA	22	—	—	—	—	—	—	The Wombles Collection
2011	"Wombling Merry Christmas" / "The Wombles Warning" / "Miss Adelaide (She's Got A Lot Of Knowledge)" / "The Jungle Is Jumping"	—	—	—	—	—	—	—	The W Factor

== Solo discography ==
=== Wellington Womble ===
==== Singles ====
1976 - "Rainmaker" / The Wombles – "Wombling in the Rain" (from Remember You're a Womble)
