= Secret Symphony =

Studio album by Katie Melua
- Released: 5 March 2012
- Genres: Acoustic pop; blues; jazz; easy listening
- Length: 37:32
- Label: Dramatico
- Producer: Mike Batt

Katie Melua chronology
The House (2010)	Secret Symphony (2012)	Ketevan (2013)

Singles from Secret Symphony
- 1. "Gold in them Hills" Released: 11 November 2011; 2. "The Bit That I Don't Get" Released: 10 February 2012; 3. "Better Than a Dream" Released: 9 March 2012; 4. "Moonshine" Released: 4 June 2012; 5. "The Walls of the World" Released: 17 September 2012; 6. "Forgetting All My Troubles" Released: 3 December 2012

Secret Symphony is the fifth studio album by British singer Katie Melua. It was released by Dramatico on 5 March 2012. Recorded at Air Studios in London and produced in collaboration with longtime musical partner Mike Batt, the album marked a departure from Melua's previous releases by focusing primarily on interpretations of songs written by other artists. Described by Melua as her "singer's album", it features orchestral arrangements of compositions by songwriters including Ron Sexsmith, alongside more familiar songs, while also incorporating two original compositions written by Melua and Batt.

The album received mixed reviews from critics, who praised Melua's vocal performances and several individual tracks but criticized its cautious approach and orchestral arrangements, with many viewing it as a retreat from the experimentation of The House (2010). Commercially, Secret Symphony reached number one in Poland and peaked within the top ten in numerous countries. The album earned Gold certifications in the United Kingdom, Germany, and Denmark, Platinum certification in Poland, and received a Diamond Award from IMPALA for European sales exceeding 200,000 copies.

== Background ==
Secret Symphony served as the follow-up to Melua's 2010 album The House, which reached number four on the UK Albums Chart. The album was recorded at Air Studios in London and produced in collaboration with orchestrator and conductor Mike Batt, who had worked extensively with Melua throughout her career. Conceived primarily as an album of interpretations, Secret Symphony marked a departure from Melua's previous releases by focusing largely on material written by other songwriters. Melua described the project as her "singer's album", explaining that performing songs written by others allowed her to explore different vocal approaches and artistic perspectives. Although the album predominantly consists of cover versions, Melua and Batt also contributed two newly written compositions. The track list includes interpretations of songs by acclaimed songwriters such as Ron Sexsmith's "Gold in Them Hills" and "Too Long at the Fair", originally recorded by Bonnie Raitt, alongside more widely known songs including "Keeping the Dream Alive". The recordings are characterized by their orchestral arrangements, performed by a symphony orchestra under Batt's direction.

== Promotion ==
The lead single, "Better Than a Dream", and the track "Walls of the World" were both originally recorded by Melua's longtime collaborator Mike Batt, for the British animated television series The Dreamstone and his 1977 solo album Schizophonia, respectively. "The Bit That I Don't Get" music video was filmed at several locations in Farnham, Surrey including the Lion and Lamb Yard, Guitar Village and 101 Collectors' Records. Farnham being the location for Mike Batt's studio where they made demo recordings.

== Critical reception ==
Professional ratings
Review scores
Source	Rating
AllMusic	3/5 stars
The Arts Desk	3/5 stars
Daily Express	3/5 stars
Evening Standard	2/5 stars
The Independent	2/5 stars
The Press	4/5 stars

Ian Sime of The Press praised Secret Symphony as "technically the best crafted album of the year to date," highlighting Batt's orchestral arrangements for creating a sound that was both "understated and lush". While noting that the album's reliance on cover versions meant it lacked the original songwriting of the Melua–Batt partnership, he commended the song selection, describing the album as "a welcome return to form". BBC Music critic Adrian Edwards described the album as "a fine fifth album” that successfully balances cover versions with original compositions. He argued that Melua "embraces songs old and new, cleverly chosen and winningly sung," praising her ability to make each cover seem as though it had been written specifically for her. Edwards also credited producer and songwriter Mike Batt, noting that his "long experience as a songwriter and producer is evident."

Jon O'Brien of AllMusic gave Secret Symphony a mixed review, calling it a "disappointing and frustrating retreat back to safety" after the experimentation of The House. While praising Melua's vocals and several individual tracks, he felt the album's arrangements were "overly polite and ultimately anodyne", concluding that it was "a clear step backwards" for the singer. Reviewing the album for The Arts Desk, Kieron Tyler similarly described the album as "lovely but cautious", arguing that it represented a return to Melua's comfort zone after the more adventurous The House. Evening Standard editor John Aizlewood gave Secret Symphony a negative review, describing it as a "crushing and chastening disappointment". He argued that Melua had abandoned the artistic progress of The House in favour of a "saccharine-engulfed orchestral album" weighed down by "syrupy, overbearing arrangements", though he singled out her version of Ron Sexsmith's "Gold in Them Hills" as a highlight. Writing for The Independent, Andy Gill criticized Secret Symphony for being emotionally restrained, arguing that Melua "seems emotionally constrained, stifling the songs in politesse". While he felt her subdued style worked on tracks such as "Gold in Them Hills" and "The Bit That I Don't Get", he found other performances overly proper and lacking in naturalness.

== Commercial performance ==
Secret Symphony achieved moderate commercial success across Europe. The album debuted at number eight on the UK Albums Chart with first week sales of 19,071 copies, becoming Melua's fifth consecutive top-ten album in the United Kingdom. It also reached the top five in several European markets, peaking at number two in Germany and Switzerland, number three in Austria, number four in Belgium and Denmark, and number one in Poland. Elsewhere, the album charted at number six in Finland, Netherlands and Norway, number seven in France, and number 23 in Ireland.

The album was certified Platinum by the Polish Society of the Phonographic Industry (ZPAV) for sales figures of over 20,000 units. It was also awarded Gold by the British Phonographic Industry (BPI) in the United Kingdom, the Bundesverband Musikindustrie (BVMI) in Germany, and IFPI Denmark, the Danish branch of the International Federation of the Phonographic Industry (IFPI). In France, Secret Symphony sold approximately 40,000 copies. In 2012, Secret Symphony was awarded a diamond certification from the Independent Music Companies Association (IMPALA) which indicated sales of at least 200,000 copies throughout Europe.

== Track listing ==
Standard listing
No.	Title	Writer(s)	Length
1.	"Gold in Them Hills"	Ron Sexsmith	3:31
2.	"Better Than a Dream"	Mike Batt	3:10
3.	"The Bit That I Don't Get"	Batt	3:12
4.	"Moonshine"	Francis Healy	2:41
5.	"Forgetting All My Troubles"	Melua	3:22
6.	"All Over the World"	Françoise Hardy	2:56
7.	"Nobody Knows You When You're Down and Out"	Jimmy Cox	4:33
8.	"The Cry of the Lone Wolf"	Melua; Batt	3:59
9.	"Heartstrings"	Melua; Batt	2:53
10.	"The Walls of the World"	Batt	3:25
11.	"Secret Symphony"	Batt	3:51

Special Bonus Edition
No.	Title	Writer(s)	Length
1.	"Gold in them Hills"	Ron Sexsmith	3:31
2.	"Better Than a Dream"	Mike Batt	3:10
3.	"The Bit That I Don't Get"	Batt	3:12
4.	"Moonshine"	Francis Healy	2:41
5.	"Forgetting All My Troubles"	Melua	3:22
6.	"All Over the World"	Françoise Hardy	2:56
7.	"Nobody Knows You When You're Down and Out"	Jimmy Cox	4:33
8.	"The Cry of the Lone Wolf"	Melua; Batt	3:59
9.	"Heartstrings"	Melua; Batt	2:53
10.	"The Walls of the World"	Batt	3:25
11.	"Secret Symphony"	Batt	3:51
12.	"Feels Like Home (The Secret Sessions)"	Randy Newman	4:50
13.	"Too Long At The Fair (The Secret Sessions)"	Joel Zoss	3:06
14.	"Love Me Tender (The Secret Sessions)"	Elvis Presley; Vera Matson	3:14
15.	"It's Over (The Secret Sessions)"	Roy Orbison; Bill Dees	3:20

== Charts ==
=== Weekly charts ===
Weekly chart performance for Secret Symphony
Chart (2012)	Peak position
Austrian Albums (Ö3 Austria)	3
Belgian Albums (Ultratop Flanders)	10
Belgian Albums (Ultratop Wallonia)	4
Canada Top Albums/CDs (RPM)	64
Danish Albums (Hitlisten)	4
Dutch Albums (Album Top 100)	6
Finnish Albums (Suomen virallinen lista)	6
French Albums (SNEP)	7
German Albums (Offizielle Top 100)	2
Irish Albums (IRMA)	23
Norwegian Albums (VG-lista)	6
Polish Albums (ZPAV)	1
Portuguese Albums (AFP)	13
Scottish Albums (Official Charts)	10
Spanish Albums (Promusicae)	46
Swedish Albums (Sverigetopplistan)	22
Swiss Albums (Schweizer Hitparade)	2
Taiwanese Albums (Five Music)	16
UK Albums (Official Charts)	8
UK Independent Albums (Official Charts)	2

=== Year-end charts ===
Year-end chart performance for Secret Symphony
Chart (2012)	Position
Austrian Albums (Ö3 Austria)	70
Belgian Albums (Ultratop Flanders)	77
Belgian Albums (Ultratop Wallonia)	34
Dutch Albums (Album Top 100)	66
German Albums (Offizielle Top 100)	35
Swiss Albums (Schweizer Hitparade)	24

== Certifications ==
Certifications for Secret Symphony
Region	Certification	Certified units/sales
Denmark (IFPI Danmark)	Gold	10,000^{^}
Germany (BVMI)	Gold	100,000^{^}
Poland (ZPAV)	Platinum	20,000^{*}
United Kingdom (BPI)	Gold	100,000^{‡}
^{*} Sales figures based on certification alone.^{^} Shipments figures based on certification alone.^{‡} Sales+streaming figures based on certification alone.
