= Superwombling =

Studio album by the Wombles
- Released: September 1975
- Recorded: February–June 1975
- Studio: Wessex Sound Studio, London; Olympic, London
- Length: 37:44
- Label: CBS
- Producer: Mike Batt

The Wombles chronology
Keep On Wombling (1974)	Superwombling (1975)

Singles from Superwombling
- 1. "Wombling White Tie and Tails (Foxtrot)" Released: April 1975; 2. "Superwomble" Released: July 1975; 3. "The Womble Shuffle" Released: April 1976

Superwombling was the fourth and final studio album released by The Wombles. The songs were recorded by Mike Batt (vocals/keyboards) with session musicians Chris Spedding (guitars), Les Hurdle (bass), Clem Cattini (drums), Ray Cooper (percussion), Rex Morris (sax), Eddie Mordue (sax) and Jack Rothstein (violin).

The various musical styles of the songs include rock, pop, blues, reggae, barbershop harmony and James Bond themes.

"The Myths And Legends Of King Merton Womble And His Journey To The Centre Of The Earth" is a parody of two contemporary concept albums – The Myths and Legends of King Arthur and the Knights of the Round Table and Journey to the Centre of the Earth – both by Rick Wakeman.

Despite having several successful singles, the album did not chart but did eventually go Silver.

== Track listing ==
All songs written by Mike Batt.

No.	Title	Length
1.	"The Womble Shuffle"	2:41
2.	"The Myths And Legends Of King Merton Womble And His Journey To The Centre Of The Earth"	5:28
3.	"Down At The Barber Shop"	2:10
4.	"The Empty Tidy-Bag Blues"	3:58
5.	"Wombling White Tie And Tails"	3:33
6.	"Superwomble"	3:26
7.	"Miss Adelaide [She's Got A Lot Of Knowledge]"	3:58
8.	"Wombles On Parade"	3:41
9.	"To Wimbledon With Love"	3:48
10.	"Nashville Wombles"	4:54
Total length:		37:43
