= Polymoog =

Synthesizer model manufactured by Moog Music

Polymoog and Polymoog Keyboard
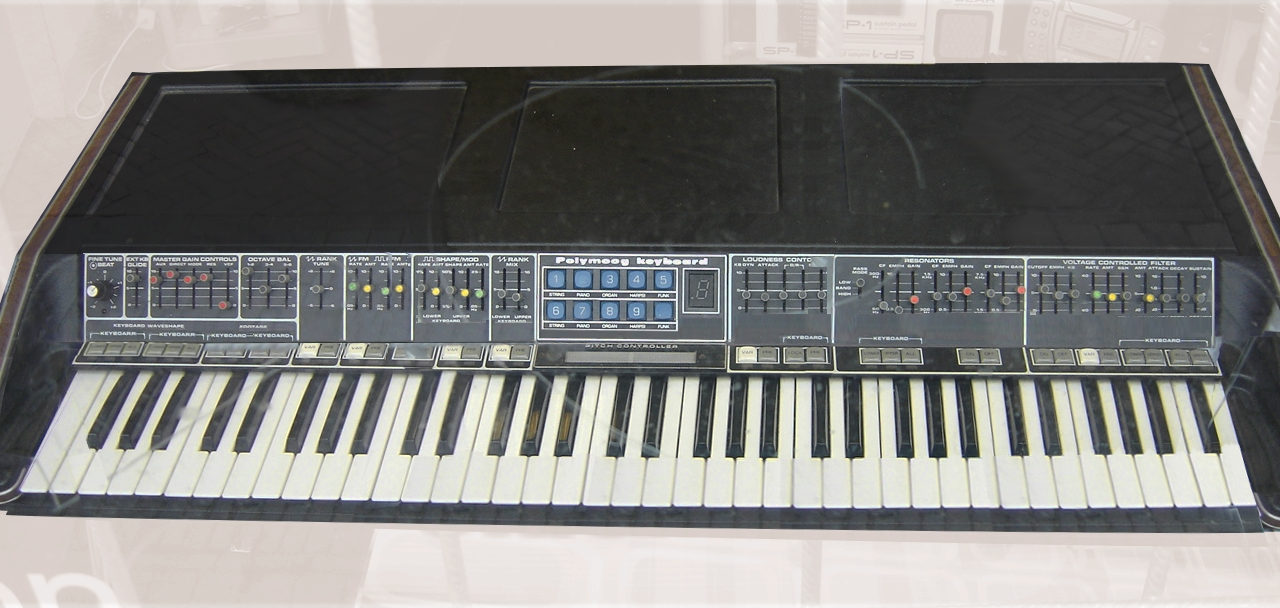
- Polymoog Synthesizer 203a
- Manufacturer: Moog Music
- Dates: 1975–80 (Polymoog); 1978–80 (Polymoog; Keyboard)
- Price: $5295 (Polymoog Synthesizer) $3995 (Polymoog Keyboard)

Technical specifications
- Polyphony: 71 (Maximum range of keyboard)
- Timbrality: Monotimbral
- Oscillator: 2 VCOs
- LFO: 4
- Synthesis type: Analog Subtractive
- Filter: Low-pass filter, high-pass filter
- Attenuator: 1
- Storage memory: 8 presets (Polymoog); 14 presets (Polymoog; Keyboard)
- Effects: 3-band EQ

Input/output
- Keyboard: 71 keys, velocity, split
- External control: CV/gate

Polymoog 280a Vox Humana
An example of the Polymoog 280a's "Vox Humana" preset, starting with the default mode and engaging variable options afterwards.

The Polymoog is a hybrid polyphonic analog synthesizer that was manufactured by Moog Music from 1975 to 1980. The Polymoog was based on divide-down oscillator technology similar to electronic organs and string synthesizers of the time.

== History ==
The name Polymoog can refer either to the original Polymoog Synthesizer (model 203a) released in 1975, or the largely preset Polymoog Keyboard (model 280a) released in 1978.

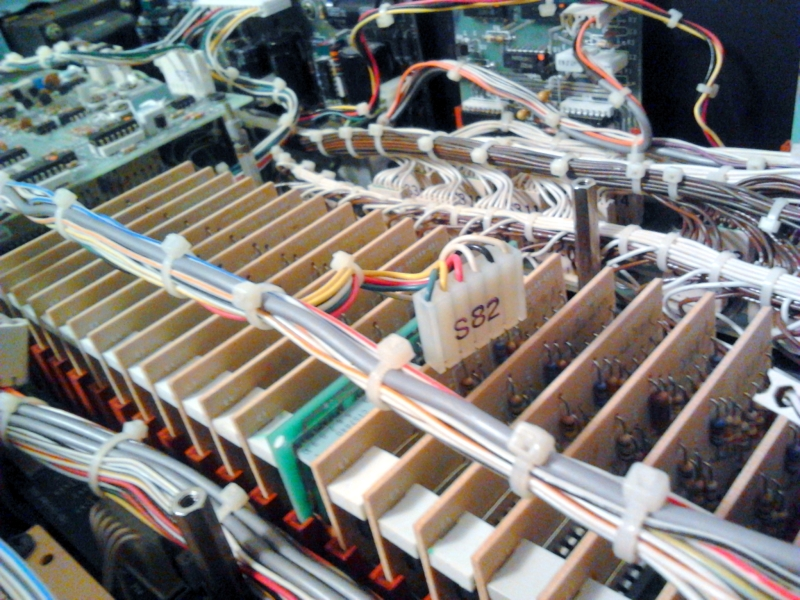
The Polymoog's "polycom" voice cards

The Polymoog has a 71-note weighted Pratt & Read touch-sensitive keyboard divided into three sections with a volume slider for each. It also has a three-band resonant graphic equalizer section, which can be changed to a low/bandpass/high-pass filter. The Moog-designed 24 dB/octave filter section allows modulation modulated from its own envelopes, low frequency oscillation and sample and hold circuit. Ranks and waveforms of all notes are also adjustable combining waveforms, octaves, tunings, and their own independent LFO rates and amounts. The user can adjust the instrument's sounds, and it offers presets named "strings", "piano", "organ", "harpsichord", "funk", "clav", "vibes", and "brass". Presets were factory created as physical circuit cards and may be modified for live performance using Var(iation) buttons, triggering a red dot next to the preset number in the display.

The design of the Polymoog is a hybrid of the electronic organ and the synthesizer using divide-down technology, much like other string synthesizers of the time. Unlike later 1970s polyphonic synthesizers, such as the Yamaha CS-80 and Sequential Circuits Prophet-5, the Polymoog cannot create each voice from individual oscillators and filters, or store sounds programmed by the user. Although criticized for its limited programmability, high purchase price of $5295 and reliability issues, the Polymoog Synthesizer was popular with musicians of the period, and its unlimited polyphony was considered revolutionary upon its initial release.

=== Polymoog Keyboard (1978–80) ===
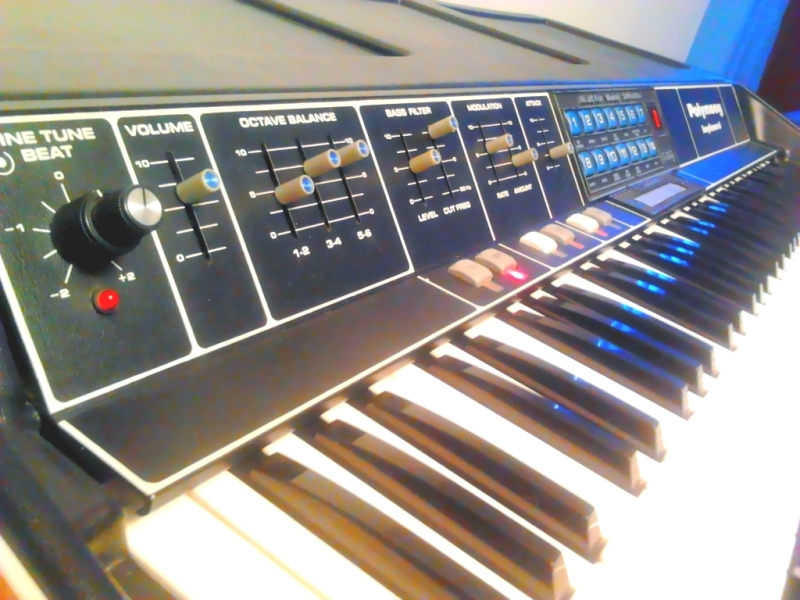
The Polymoog Keyboard model 280a

The Polymoog Keyboard 280a is a stripped-down version of the original 1975 Polymoog. The two are similar in appearance, sharing the same case and keyboard. The right-hand control panel is absent, while the left-hand panel has only a few sliders, giving the user less control over the sounds. The Polymoog Keyboard features more presets than its predecessor: "vox humana", "string 1", "string 2", "electric piano", "piano", "honky tonky", "clav", "harpsi", "brass", "chorus brass", "pipe organ", "rock organ", "vibes", and "funk". Control over these presets is limited to octave balance, envelope attack, and LFO modulation depth and rate. The lower two octaves may also be split off to play a separate bass tone, with some control over this tone allowed via a dedicated bass filter. Filter control of the main preset sounds is not user adjustable other than via an external controller. The Polymoog Keyboard was less expensive than its predecessor, being priced at $3995 in 1979. The best known of the presets on the Polymoog Keyboard is "Vox Humana", which was not present on the original Polymoog. This preset forms the basis of the electronic string sound in the work of Gary Numan.

=== Foot-operated controller ===
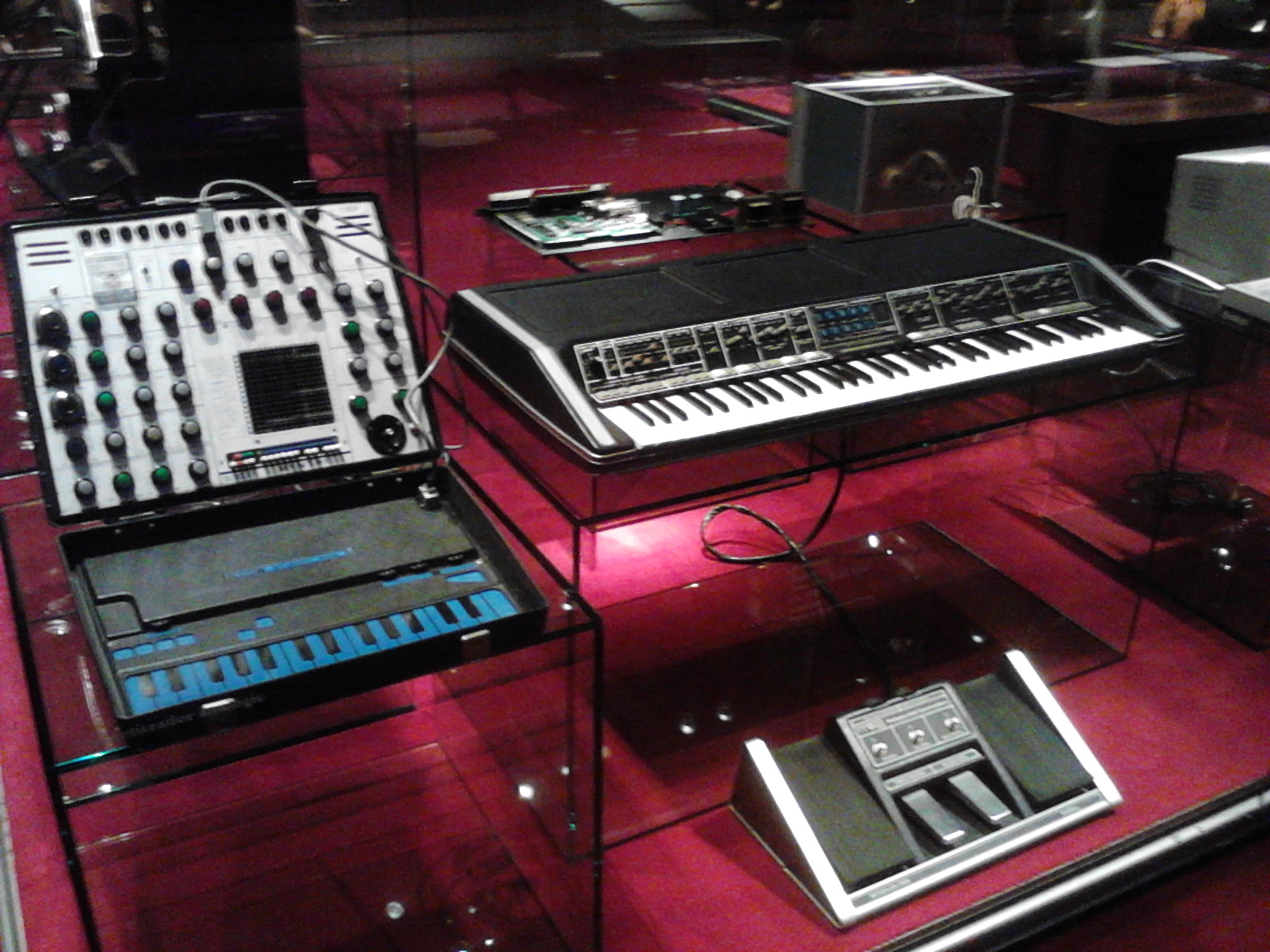
right: Polymoog with Polypedal

An optional foot-operated controller known as the Polypedal (model 285a), with control voltage jacks, interfaces with the back panel. It allows the user to switch between single and multiple triggering of envelopes, and controls for pitch, filter, and sustain.

== Notable users ==
Cat Stevens used the Polymoog on his 1977 album Izitso, including the song "(Remember the Days of the) Old Schoolyard". Gary Numan was one of the Polymoog's most recognizable users. The electronic string sound featured prominently on the track "Cars" and most of the album The Pleasure Principle (1979) became his signature sound in the late 1970s and early 1980s. A Polymoog is shown in his music video for "Cars" as well as in live performances on Top of the Pops and The Old Grey Whistle Test. French duo Space Art used a Polymoog during the recording of their second album, Trip in the Centre Head. Yellow Magic Orchestra used the Polymoog on their early albums and first world tour.

Prince used a Polymoog at Sound 80 recording studio on demo tapes for his first album For You (1978), and the Polymoog became a notable sonic element of the Minneapolis sound.

The Polymoog proved popular with various progressive rock musicians. Keith Emerson added an early prototype Polymoog (at the time, known as the Apollo) to his stage rig. Rick Wakeman used one during his second stint with Yes in the late 1970s and Tony Banks of Genesis used one between 1977 and 1981. Keith Godchaux used a Polymoog between 1976 and 1979 live with the Grateful Dead. Mike Oldfield used a Polymoog on "Sheba" (from his 1980 album QE2) in conjunction with a vocoder.

== See also ==
- List of Moog synthesizer players
- Moog Music
- Moog synthesizer
- Robert Moog
