= Remember You're a Womble =

Studio album by The Wombles
- Released: July 1974
- Recorded: February 1974
- Studio: Wessex, London
- Genre: Bubblegum pop, pop rock, novelty, surf rock
- Length: 32:24
- Label: CBS
- Producer: Mike Batt

The Wombles chronology
Wombling Songs (1973)	Remember You're a Womble (1974)	Keep On Wombling (1974)

Singles from Remember You're a Womble
- 1. "Remember You're a Womble" Released: March 1974; 2. "Banana Rock" Released: June 1974; 3. "Wombling Summer Party" Released: July 1974 (US); 4. "Minuetto Allegretto" Released: October 1974

Remember You're a Womble is the second album released by The Wombles. The songs were recorded by Mike Batt (vocals/keyboards) with session musicians Chris Spedding (guitars), Les Hurdle (bass), Clem Cattini (drums), Ray Cooper (percussion), Rex Morris (saxophone), Eddie Mordue (saxophone) and Jack Rothstein (violin).

After the success of the first album, Wombling Songs, Batt experimented with more character-based songs in a variety of musical styles. He described it as "really the first proper album for The Wombles as a group". The styles included pop, rock, calypso, classical (the music of "Minuetto Allegretto" was based on Mozart's Symphony No.41) and surf rock in the style of the Beach Boys.

The songs also developed the Womble characters further, for example "Wellington Goes To Waterloo" described Wellington Womble taking a rare day off and visiting London Waterloo station for a bit of trainspotting.

It was released in the US with a different tracklist, which added four songs from the previous album, Wombling Songs.

== Track listing ==
All tracks credited to Mike Batt on the LP label. However, other credits do exist as detailed below (source unknown).

=== Side One ===
1. Remember You're a Womble (Mike Batt), - 3:07
2. Minuetto Allegretto (Batt/Mozart) - 3:33
3. Non-Stop Wombling Summer Party (Batt) - 4:00
4. Wombling in the Rain (Batt) - 3:54
5. Womble Burrow Boogie (Batt) - 2:58

=== Side Two ===
1. Wellington Goes to Waterloo (Batt) - 3:30
2. The Return of Cousin Yellowstone (Batt) - 3:06
3. The Womble Square Dance (Batt) - 3:12
4. Wimbledon Sunset (Interlude) (Batt) - 1:48
5. Banana Rock (Batt) - 3:16

== Charts ==
Chart performance for Remember You're a Womble
Chart (1974)	Peak position
UK Albums (OCC)	18
