= Wonderful Land =

1962 single by The Shadows

Single by The Shadows
- B-side: "Stars Fell on Stockton"
- Released: 23 February 1962
- Recorded: 12 May, 6 July 1961 and 18 January 1962
- Studio: EMI Studios, London
- Genre: Instrumental surf
- Length: 2:02
- Label: Columbia
- Songwriter(s): Jerry Lordan
- Producer(s): Norrie Paramor

The Shadows singles chronology
"The Savage" (1961)	"Wonderful Land" (1962)	"Guitar Tango" (1962)

"Wonderful Land" is an instrumental piece written by Jerry Lordan and first recorded and released as a single by The Shadows in February 1962. It stayed at number one for eight weeks on the UK Singles Chart, a feat only Elvis Presley (in 1960), the Shadows and the Archies (in 1969) managed in the whole of the 1960s.

== Background and release ==
Lordan had previously written the hugely successful "Apache", which the Shadows had recorded. On writing the song, Lordan said "I got the first phrase and it took me six months to get to the middle. I knew it had to have a second part and I couldn't think of anything". The basic track was recorded on 12 May 1961, with tom-tom overdub and extra drumming recorded on 6 July. However, there was something missing with the song and the Shadows kept it unreleased. Whilst the group were on tour, producer and musician Norrie Paramor added French horns and strings on 18 January 1962. Hank Marvin came up with the title, "Wonderful Land", referring to America, but Lordan did not like it and "wish[ed] [he] could have come up with something better".

It was the last single to be recorded by drummer Tony Meehan for the group. By the time of the song's release, he had left the group and been replaced by Brian Bennett who co-wrote the B-side "Stars Fell on Stockton" with the rest of the group. The group was in a period of transition and whilst the song was at number one, Jet Harris left to be replaced by Brian Locking.

== Track listings ==
7": Columbia / DB 4790

1. "Wonderful Land" – 2:02
2. "Stars Fell on Stockton" – 2:17

== Personnel ==
- Hank Marvin – electric lead guitar
- Bruce Welch – acoustic rhythm guitar
- Jet Harris – electric bass guitar
- Tony Meehan – drums, tom-tom overdub
- Norrie Paramor Orchestra – French horns, strings

== Charts ==
Chart (1962)	Peak position
Australia (Kent Music Report)	2
Australia (Music Maker)	2
Belgium (Ultratop 50 Flanders)	13
Belgium (Ultratop 50 Wallonia)	26
Canada (Vancouver CFUN)	27
Germany (GfK)	26
Ireland (Evening Herald)	1
Israel (Kol Israel)	1
Netherlands (Single Top 100)	2
New Zealand (Lever Hit Parade)	1
Norway (VG-lista)	2
South Africa (Radio South Africa & Lourenço Marques)	1
UK Singles (OCC)	1

== Cover versions ==
"Wonderful Land" has been covered by a number of artists including Mike Oldfield, Mark Knopfler and Tony Iommi. Iommi's version appears on Twang!: A Tribute to Hank Marvin & the Shadows.

=== Mike Oldfield version ===
"Wonderful Land"

Single by Mike Oldfield

from the album QE2
- A-side: "Sheba"
- Released: 28 November 1980
- Recorded: Denham, 1980
- Length: 2:50
- Label: Virgin
- Songwriter(s): Jerry Lordan
- Producer(s): Mike Oldfield; David Hentschel

Mike Oldfield singles chronology
"Arrival" (1980)	"Wonderful Land" (1980)	"The Singles" (1981)

English musician Mike Oldfield covered "Wonderful Land" on his 1980 Virgin Records album, QE2. Oldfield's version was also released as a single and as the B-side for his "Sheba" single; in some countries, "Wonderful Land" was the A-side. The Shadows later covered one of Oldfield's songs, "Moonlight Shadow".

The video for "Wonderful Land" again shows Oldfield playing various instruments, including a violin, which he has claimed not to be able to play very well. The video is available on the Elements - The Best of Mike Oldfield video.

==== Charts ====
Chart (1981)	Peak position
Australia (Kent Music Report)	40

=== Hank Marvin and Mark Knopfler version ===
Two guitarists, Hank Marvin (of The Shadows) and Mark Knopfler (of Dire Straits) recorded a version of "Wonderful Land" on the 1993 album Heartbeat, produced by Jeff Lynne.
