= Better Than a Dream =

Single by Katie Melua

from the album Secret Symphony
- Released: 9 March 2012
- Recorded: 2011
- Genre: Acoustic/Blues
- Length: 3:10
- Label: Dramatico
- Songwriter(s): Mike Batt
- Producer(s): Mike Batt

Katie Melua singles chronology
"The Bit That I Don't Get" (2012)	"Better Than a Dream" (2012)	"Moonshine" (2012)

"Better Than a Dream" is a song performed by the Georgian-born, British singer Katie Melua, from her fifth studio album Secret Symphony. The song was written and originally recorded by Mike Batt whose version was used as the closing credits theme of the 1990s animated series, The Dreamstone. The single was released on 9 March 2012. The song has charted in Belgium.

== Track listing ==
No.	Title	Length
1.	"Better Than A Dream"	3:10

== Charts ==
Chart (2012)	Peak position
Belgium (Ultratip Bubbling Under Flanders)	48
Belgium (Ultratip Bubbling Under Wallonia)	23
UK Indie (OCC)	41

== Release history ==
Region	Date	Format	Label
Belgium	9 March 2012	Digital download	Dramatico
