= Keep On Wombling =

Studio album by the Wombles
- Released: December 1974
- Recorded: October 1974
- Studio: Wessex, London
- Length: 33.17
- Label: CBS
- Producer: Mike Batt

The Wombles chronology
Remember You're a Womble (1974)	Keep On Wombling (1974)	Superwombling (1975)

Singles from Keep On Wombling
- 1. "Wombling Merry Christmas" Released: November 1974

Keep On Wombling is the third album released by the Wombles. The songs were written and performed by Mike Batt (vocals/keyboards) with session musicians Chris Spedding (guitars), Les Hurdle (bass), Clem Cattini (drums), Ray Cooper (percussion), Rex Morris (sax), Eddie Mordue (sax) and Jack Rothstein (violin).

This was a departure from the first two albums, being a partial concept album with the first side (subtitled "Orinoco's Dream") following singer Orinoco Womble through a series of dreams. The styles included pop, rock and classical (Hall Of The Mountain Womble is an arrangement of In the Hall of the Mountain King by Edvard Grieg).

The album spent six weeks in the UK album charts, peaking at number 17.

== Track listing ==
All songs written by Mike Batt, unless otherwise noted.

=== Side One ===
ORINOCO'S DREAM (Fantasies of a sleeping Womble)

1. Womble Of The Universe (In which Orinoco dreams he is an ASTRONAUT) - 3:41
2. The Orinoco Kid (In which Orinoco dreams he is a COWBOY) - 3:17
3. The Jungle Is Jumping (In which Orinoco dreams he is a JUNGLE EXPLORER) - 3:21
4. Underground Overture (In which Orinoco dreams he is the CONDUCTOR) - 2:39
5. The Hall Of The Mountain Womble (Edvard Grieg, arr. Batt) (In which Orinoco's imaginary orchestra does a little turn) - 1:44
6. Look Out For The Giant (In which Orinoco imagines a litter crunching giant, GIANT POLU) - 2:24

=== Side Two ===
1. The Wombling Twist (At the Womble club down in West L.A.) - 3:00
2. Tobermory's Music Machine (In which the NEEDLE STICKS) - 2:18
3. Wipe Those Womble Tears From Your Eyes (A country Womble ballad) - 3:42
4. Invitation To The Ping-Pong Ball (In which we meet the Chinese Wombles, Shanghai Burrow) - 3:49
5. Wombling Merry Christmas (With virtuoso sleigh bell performance by Great Uncle Bulgaria) - 3:22

== Singles ==
"Wombling Merry Christmas" was released as single. "The Orinoco Kid" was later released on the B-side of "Superwomble". "The Wombling Twist" was later released on the B-side of "Wombling White Tie And Tails".

"Womble Of The Universe" was used in the soundtrack of the 1977 film Wombling Free.

== Charts ==
Chart performance for Remember You're a Womble
Chart (1974–75)	Peak position
UK Albums (OCC)	17
