= Arrival (composition) =

1976 composition by ABBA

Instrumental by ABBA

from the album Arrival
- Released: 11 October 1976
- Genre: Pop
- Length: 3:00
- Label: Polar
- Songwriters: Björn Ulvaeus; Benny Andersson
- Producers: Björn Ulvaeus; Benny Andersson

Audio video
- "Arrival" on YouTube

"Arrival" is a 1976 composition by Swedish pop group ABBA from their album Arrival. It is an instrumental piece, mainly the brainchild of member Benny Andersson. The most widely heard cover versions are ones by French singer Michèle Torr released under the title "J'aime", British musician Mike Oldfield on his album QE2, the singing duo Daniel Balavoine and Anni-Frid Lyngstad creating a French-language song titled "Belle", and the duo Frida and BA Robertson, as part of the UK musical Abbacadabra, performing an English-language version titled "Time".

The original Abba version is played as walk-on music for English rock band The Darkness (band).

== Background ==
"Arrival" was the second and last composition from the group not to contain lyrics, following "Intermezzo No. 1" the previous year. As with "Intermezzo No. 1", the choral tune, heavily influenced by traditional Swedish folk music, was written by Benny Andersson and Björn Ulvaeus. It was recorded on 30 August 1976 at Stockholm's Metronome Studio. The title of the album, Arrival, gave the instrumental its name, rather than vice versa. It was also one of the last tracks to be recorded for the album before its release on 11 October 1976.

== Cover versions ==
=== Mike Oldfield version ===
"Arrival"

Single by Mike Oldfield

from the album QE2
- Released: 12 September 1980
- Recorded: 1980
- Length: 2:46
- Label: Virgin
- Songwriters: Benny Anderson; Björn Ulvaeus
- Producers: Mike Oldfield; David Hentschel

Mike Oldfield singles chronology
"Blue Peter" (1979)	"Arrival" (1980)	"Sheba" (1980)

In 1980, Mike Oldfield recorded a cover version of the song for his album QE2, released as the lead single in September 1980. The artwork for Oldfield's single is a recreation of ABBA's Arrival album artwork, depicting the artist flying in a Bell 47G helicopter (as Oldfield is a licensed helicopter pilot); the "K" in "MIKE" is likewise mirrored as a nod to ABBA's ambigram logo.

==== Track listing ====
1. "Arrival" – 2:46
2. "Polka" (live on European tour 1980) – 3:34

==== Personnel (Oldfield version) ====
- Mike Oldfield – electric guitars, African drums, Celtic harp, bass guitar, mandolin, Spanish guitar, synthesizers, vocoder, Aboriginal rhythm sticks, vocals
- David Hentschel – synthesizers, drums, vocals
- Maggie Reilly – vocals
- David Bedford – arranger (strings and choir)
- Dick Studt – leader (strings)
- English Chorale – choir

=== Abbacadabra versions by Frida ===
==== Duet with Daniel Balavoine ====
As part of the French musical Abbacadabra, Daniel Balavoine and ABBA member Frida recorded a French-language cover of Arrival, titled "Belle" (lit. ''Beautiful'') in August 1983, with lyrics written by Alain and Daniel Boublil. Released by Barclay Records, the single, backed with B-side "C'est fini", sold 80,000 copies in France, and peaked at No. 28 in the French Top 50 charts.

==== English-language duet with BA Robertson ====
Shortly after "Belle", Frida and BA Robertson recorded an English-language version called “Time” for the British production of Abbacadabra, with lyrics by Don Black and Mike Batt. Batt also produced the song. Released on 9 December 1983 by Polar and Epic Records, A music video was created to promote the single. The single, backed with "I Am The Seeker" as B-side, entered the UK singles chart and peaked at No. 45.

=== Michèle Torr version ===
French singer Michèle Torr covered the song and added lyrics, under the title "J'aime". Released as a 1977 single, the song reached No.4 in Belgium.
