= Tarot Suite =

Studio album by Mike Batt
- Released: 1979
- Label: Epic
- Producer: Mike Batt

Mike Batt chronology
| Schizophonia (1977) | Tarot Suite (1979) | Waves (1980) |

Tarot Suite is the third solo album by English singer-songwriter Mike Batt, credited as "Mike Batt and Friends". It was released in 1979 by Epic Records.

== Background and content ==
Tarot Suite is a concept album, inspired by the 22 Major Arcana trump cards of the tarot deck, of which Batt had been fascinated by the artwork and tradition. The album's liner notes include a description of the various cards and how they individually relate to each track on the album.

Like his previous album Schizophonia (1977), Tarot Suite contains what Batt has described as an "experimental combination of rock and symphonic instruments.

== Critical reception ==
Professional ratings
Review scores
| Source | Rating |
|---|---|
| AllMusic | 4.5/5 stars |

In a review for AllMusic, Dave Sleger said that the album is "an artfully and literate collection of orchestrated rock & roll", and that it features an "impressive assemblage of musicians". He opined that on the track "Imbecile", guest singer Roger Chapman "has never appeared to have better control of his voice".

== Track listing ==
All tracks written by Mike Batt.

Side one

| No. | Title | Length |
|---|---|---|
| 1. | "Introduction (The Journey of a Fool)" | 4:26 |
| 2. | "Imbecile" (vocal: Roger Chapman) | 5:05 |
| 3. | "Plainsong" | 1:58 |
| 4. | "Lady of the Dawn" (vocal: Mike Batt) | 4:00 |
| 5. | "The Valley of Swords" | 5:30 |

Side two

| No. | Title | Length |
|---|---|---|
| 1. | "Losing Your Way in the Rain" (vocal: Colin Blunstone) | 3:33 |
| 2. | "Tarota" | 6:13 |
| 3. | "The Night of the Dead" | 3:30 |
| 4. | "The Dead of the Night" | 1:58 |
| 5. | "Run Like the Wind" (vocal: Roger Chapman) | 4:27 |

== Personnel ==
Adapted from the album's liner notes.

=== Musicians ===
- Mike Batt – vocals (side one: track 4), arranger, conductor
- Colin Blunstone – vocals (side two: track 1)
- Roger Chapman – vocals (side one: track 2; side two: track 5)
- Tony Carr – percussion
- B. J. Cole – pedal steel guitar
- Mel Collins – saxophone
- Ray Cooper – percussion
- Jim Cregan – lead guitar
- Harold Fisher – drums
- Mike Fry – percussion
- Rory Gallagher – lead guitar
- Ricky Hitchcock – rhythm guitar
- Chris Karan – percussion
- London Symphony Orchestra – orchestra (leader: Irvine Arditti)
- Frank McDonald – bass guitar
- Tony McPhee – lead guitar
- Trevor Morais – drums
- Roy Morgan – percussion
- Alan Parker – rhythm guitar
- Chris Spedding – lead guitar
- Les Thatcher – rhythm guitar
- Martin Kershaw – rhythm guitar

=== Technical ===
- Mike Batt – producer
- Mike Thompson – principal recording engineer
- Robert Butterworth – engineer
- Gary Langan – engineer
- Dick Lewsey – engineer
- Julian Mendelsohn – engineer
- Vaughan Rogers – engineer
- John Timperley – engineer
- Eric Tomlinson – engineer
- Sleeve design: Mike Batt & Simon Cantwell
- Artwork: Jack Richards
- Photography: Peter Lavery
- Typography: Richard Field

== Charts ==
Chart performance for Tarot Suite
| Chart (1979) | Peak position |
|---|---|
| Dutch Albums (Album Top 100) | 32 |
| German Albums (Offizielle Top 100) | 29 |
| New Zealand Albums (RMNZ) | 3 |
| Swedish Albums (Sverigetopplistan) | 47 |
