= Seaside Special =

European light entertainment show

- Genre: Entertainment
- Presented by: Various
- Theme music composer: Mike Batt
- Opening theme: "Summertime City"
- Countries of origin: United Kingdom; France; Switzerland; Belgium
- Original languages: English; French

Production
- Executive producer: Michael Hurll
- Producer: Michael Hurll

Original release
- Network: BBC1; ITV; TF1; TSR; RTB
- Release: 5 July 1975 – 20 August 1988

Related
- Show of the Week: The Young Generation Big Top (BBC2); Summertime Special

Seaside Special is a European light entertainment show broadcast from 1975 until 1979. It was an outside broadcast based at a big top around numerous British seaside resorts. Originally the big top belonged to various circuses (mainly Gerry Cottle's Circus), but in later seasons, the BBC bought its own to be the venue. The programme was developed by producer Michael Hurll. The series was developed after a short-lived, 6 part 'trial' aired on BBC2 in 1973, under the title Show of the Week: The Young Generation Big Top, starring the dance troupe The Young Generation and hosted by various personalities. The series was broadcast from various Pontin's Holiday Camps around the UK under the Gerry Cottle Big Top. The first show, airing on 6 August 1973, was hosted by Clodagh Rodgers. While this show was originally made in the United Kingdom, it was also co-produced in France, Switzerland and Belgium.

The format was revived by the BBC as Summertime Special with all eight episodes broadcast on BBC1 from Brighton, starting on 25 July 1981. The following year a further six episodes of Summertime Special were commissioned, this time broadcast from Eastbourne starting on 17 July 1982.

A final series was shown on BBC1 on 25 July 1987, this time called Seaside Special '87, all six episodes were broadcast from Jersey and hosted by Mike Smith.

Between 1986 and 1988, ITV broadcast their own incarnation of the format under the Summertime Special banner from Bournemouth, hosted by Bobby Davro & others and produced by TVS.

== The show ==
It was essentially a variety show, hosted by Radio 1 and Radio 2 DJs, consisting of a music act, a comedy act, and dancers New Edition. The 1977 series featured a beauty competition.

Typical acts were Little and Large, Keith Harris and Orville, Lena Zavaroni, The Jimmy Brown Dancers, The New Edition, Bernie Clifton, Showaddywaddy, The Wurzels, Sacha Distel, Peters and Lee, Val Doonican, Ronnie Corbett, The Goodies and Nana Mouskouri. Some segments of the show were shot outside the big top, including one occasion when the Brotherhood of Man sang "My Sweet Rosalie" sitting in a particularly unstable-looking lifeboat.

The show's theme, "Summertime City", written and sung by Mike Batt, was a UK Top 10 hit in 1975.
