= Abbacadabra =

French musical

ABBAcadabra
- Album cover for the 1983 French soundtrack album
- Music: Benny Andersson; Björn Ulvaeus
- Lyrics: Benny Andersson; Björn Ulvaeus
- Book: Alain Boublil; Daniel Boublil
- Productions: 1983 France; 1983 London; 1984 Portugal; 1985 Netherlands

ABBAcadabra is a French children's musical based on songs from the pop group ABBA. It was originally produced for French television in 1983 by Alain Boublil and Daniel Boublil, which was later also transferred to an English stage version and two other television programs. The story was not always the same as the selection of the chosen songs varied by productions.

== Productions ==
=== Original French production ===
The French television production consisted of 12 ABBA songs with new French lyrics by Alain and Daniel Boublil, and the story was based on classic fairy tales like Sleeping Beauty, Cinderella, Pinocchio, Snow White and others. The cast was made up of children and well known French speaking singers like Fabienne Thibeault, Daniel Balavoine, Plastic Bertrand, Maurice Barrier, Daniel Boublil (as 'Daniel Beaufixe'), Francoise Pourcel (as Marie Framboise), Catherine Ferry, Stéphane Le Navelan, Stéphane Boublil (son of Alain), Clémentine Autain and Emmanuelle Pailly. Anni-Frid Lyngstad from ABBA, also known as Frida, was invited to play the part of "Belle au bois dormant" (Sleeping Beauty), and recorded the song "Belle" (a cover of ABBA's 1976 instrumental track "Arrival") as a duet with Daniel Balavoine.

Abbacadabra was originally broadcast on the French TV channel TF1 over Christmas in 1983.

A soundtrack album, entitled ABBAcadabra: Conte musical, featuring songs and narration from the production, was produced in 1983 as well. According to liner notes on the album cover, arrangements and musical direction were provided by Raymond Donnez and production by Alain Boublil with assistance by Raymond Donnez, Daniel Boublil, and Françoise Pourcel. The album was released by WEA Filipacchi Music in France and WEA Music of Canada in Québec.

The album spawned several single releases in France, including "Mon Nez Mon Nez" by Plastic Bertrand, "L'Enfant Do" by Stéphane Boublil, and the Anni-Frid Lyngstad and Daniel Balavoine duet "Belle", which also saw release outside France in a few European countries and Canada.

==== French musical numbers ====
- Qu'est-ce que j'vais faire plus tard (What I'm gonna do later) / When I Kissed the Teacher
- Délivrés / The Visitors (Crackin' Up)
- Abbacadabra / Take a Chance on Me
- Mon nez mon nez (My nose my nose) / Money Money Money
- Tête d'allumette (Match head) / Super Trouper
- Imagine-moi (Imagine me) / I Wonder (Departure)
- Carabosse super show / Dancing Queen
- Pareils et mêmes (Same and same) / I Let the Music Speak
- L'enfant do (Children do) / Fernando
- Lâchez mes cassettes (Let go of my tapes) / I'm a Marionette
- Belle (Beautiful) / Arrival
- Envoyez le générique (Send the end credits) / Thank You for the Music

=== Original London production ===
Cameron Mackintosh decided to produce a live-action English stage version of the TV show with lyrics by David Wood, Mike Batt, and Don Black. Benny Andersson and Björn Ulvaeus, who wrote the songs in ABBA, contributed with one new song, "(I Am) The Seeker".

The musical premiered 8 December 1983 at the Lyric Hammersmith theatre in London, to mixed reviews and full houses for 8 weeks, closing on 21 January 1984. Among the actors were Elaine Paige, Michael Praed, Nigel Harman, Finola Hughes, BA Robertson, and Jenna Russell. A couple of singles were released from the show in several European countries. These were produced and arranged by Mike Batt. One featured Elaine Paige's recording of "Like an Image Passing By", a cover of ABBA's "My Love, My Life", with a B side of Finola Hughes singing "When Dreamers Close Their Eyes". Another single (also released in Australia) paired Anni-Frid Lyngstad and BA Robertson singing "Time", an English version of "Belle"/"Arrival", with Robertson solo on the B-side singing "I Am The Seeker".

==== English musical numbers ====
- Another World (Take A Chance On Me)
- Battle of The Brooms (Money, Money, Money)
- (I Am) The Seeker (new song)
- I Can Pull Some Strings (The Piper)
- Going Going Gone (On and On and On)
- Making Magic (Super Trouper)
- When Dreamers Close Their Eyes (Like An Angel Passing Through My Room)
- Belonging (I Let The Music Speak)
- Back Home Now (Fernando)
- Carabosse Supershow (Dancing Queen)
- Think Of Something Fast (I'm A Marionette)
- Time (Arrival)
- Like An Image Passing By (My Love, My Life)
- Thank You For The Magic (Thank You For The Music)
- Finale

=== Other productions ===
==== Dutch production ====
A Dutch version of this musical was recorded at the end of 1984 with José Hoebee and Marga Scheide (of Dutch girl group Luv') and aired on TV in 1985. Not all the songs were recorded, but the album released in Belgium on the Indisc label, featured the same songs as the French version. The album was recorded with Ron Brandsteder, Bonnie St. Claire, Benny Neyman, Marga Scheide, José Hoebee, Nico Haak, Willem Duijn, Bianca Folkers, & Nancy Dubbeldam. The frame story is that an evil "video fairy" wants to ban and imprison the figures of the Fairy Tale on a videotape.

===== Dutch musical numbers =====
- "Als Ik Later Groot Ben" (When I grow up) (When I Kissed The Teacher)
- "Wij Zijn Vrij" (We are free) (The Visitors (Cracking Up))
- Abbacadabra (Take A Chance On Me) Cinderella
- Me Neus, Me Neus (My nose, my nose) (Money Money Money) Pinocchio
- Het Liedje Van Alladin (The song of Aladdin) (Super Trouper) Aladdin
- Spiegel (Mirror) (I Wonder (Departure)) Snow White
- De Kokende Spoken Show (Cooking ghosts show) (Dancing Queen)
- Toen Ik Een Wolfje Was (When I was a wolfie) (I Let The Music Speak) Big Bad Wolf
- Naar Huis Toe (Homewards) (Fernando)
- Geef Die Banden Terug (Give back those tapes) (I'm A Marionette) The evil video fairy
- Bij Mij (With me) (Arrival) Sleeping Beauty
- Laat Het Feest Beginnen (Let the party begin!) (Thank You For The Music)

==== Portugal production ====
A Portuguese version was also made for television, adapted into Portuguese by Nuno Gomes dos Santos, and an album released in 1984 on the Orfeu record label in Portugal.

===== Portuguese songs =====
- Que Mal Fizemos Nós (What wrong have we done) (When I Kissed The Teacher)
- O Sonho De Joao (John's Dream) (The Visitors)
- Abbacadabra (Take A Chance On Me)
- O Nariz De Pinóquio (Pinocchio's Nose) (Money Money Money)
- Aladin Fanfarrão (Aladdin's fanfare) (Super Trouper)
- Branca De Neve E O Espelho (Snow White And The Mirror) (I Wonder (Departure))
- Rainha Má Superstar (Evil Queen Superstar) (Dancing Queen)
- Cinderela E O Soldadinho (Cinderella And The Soldier) (I Let The Music Speak)
- Os Amigos (The friends) (Fernando)
- Larguem A Cassette (Let Go Of The Cassette) (I'm A Marionette)
- Branca De Neve E O Principezinho (Snow White And The Little Prince) (Arrival)
- Não Basta Ralhar (Takes More Than Scolding) (Thank You For The Music)

===== Portuguese cast =====
- Aladino: Fernando
- Alice: Suzy Paula
- Branca de Neve: Maria João
- Cinderela: Helena Ramos
- Pinóquio: Nuno Gomes dos Santos
- Locutor: José Nuno Martins
- Principezinho: Antonio Manuel Ribeiro
- Raínha Má: Lenita Genti
- Soldadinho: Samuel
- Ana e Joana: As Gémeas
- João e Pedro: João e Pedro Cabeleira
- Rosas: Inês Martins, Teresa Marta e Isabel Campelo, Vanda e Ana Carvalho
- Cravos e Metralhas: Zé da Ponte, Luis de Freitas e Nuno Gomes dos Santos

== See also ==
- Mamma Mia!, another musical based on the songs of ABBA
