= Wombling Merry Christmas =

Single by The Wombles

from the album Keep On Wombling
- B-side: "Madame Cholet"
- Released: November 1974
- Genre: Glam rock, Christmas, children's music
- Length: 3:18
- Label: CBS
- Songwriter: Mike Batt
- Producer: Mike Batt

The Wombles singles chronology
"Minuetto Allegretto" (1974)	"Wombling Merry Christmas" (1974)	"Wombling White Tie and Tails (Foxtrot)" (1975)

Music video
- "Wombling Merry Christmas" on YouTube

"Wombling Merry Christmas" is a Christmas song written by Mike Batt, and recorded by British band the Wombles. Released in November 1974, the song rose to a peak of No. 2 on the UK Singles Chart in December that year, spending 8 weeks in the chart. The song was also released in West Germany, but failed to chart.

== Music video ==
The video was recorded in 2011 as part of a re-release that year and shows the Wombles dancing to the song. The band also appeared on Top of the Pops performing the song over Christmas 1974.

== Reception ==
Despite significant success, the song was widely mocked on release. However, the song, labelled as "innocent", and likened to "golden tears falling from heaven" was liked by many, and was described in 2011 as "actually sound[ing] good this time around". Bob Stanley described it as having "more bonhomie than a dozen boxes of crackers".

Later on, Mike Batt remarked on this criticism of the song, saying "...I wrote Wombling Merry Christmas, so I'm not scared of cliches", and that "back in the 1970s people were more in tune with the spirit of these songs".

== Chart performance ==
Chart (1974)	Peak position
UK Singles Chart	2

The song was prevented from reaching number one by Mud's "Lonely This Christmas" which (combined with a poor marketing campaign on behalf of the Wombles) 'more than halved' sales.

== 2011 re-release and Christmas number one campaign ==
In December 2011, after the Wombles performed at the Glastonbury Festival, Dramatico released a CD single of "Wombling Merry Christmas", and this was set for the Christmas number one, hoping to beat the X Factor winner.

=== Track listing ===
1. "Wombling Merry Christmas"
2. "The Wombles Warning"
3. "Miss Adelaide (She's Got a Lot of Knowledge)"
4. "The Jungle Is Jumping" (download and streaming only)

The release failed to reach the Christmas number one spot, which was achieved by the Military Wives Choir with "Wherever You Are".

== I Wish It Could Be a Wombling Merry Christmas Every Day ==
In 2000, the song was used as part of a medley with Wizzard's "I Wish It Could Be Christmas Everyday", titled "I Wish It Could Be a Wombling Merry Christmas Every Day". This song was described by Batt as a "very silly record"; however, it proceeded to reach No. 22 on the UK Singles Chart, and staying on the chart for 3 weeks.

=== Chart performance ===
Chart (2000)	Peak position
UK Singles Chart	22
