= Philharmania =

Studio album by Mike Batt
- Released: 1998
- Genre: Rock
- Producer: Mike Batt

Philharmania is an album produced, arranged and conducted by Mike Batt in 1998. Performers included the Royal Philharmonic Orchestra and guest singers including Roger Daltrey, Marc Almond, Bonnie Tyler, Status Quo, Huey Lewis, Kim Wilde, Lemmy, Justin Hayward, and others. The album was recorded at Abbey Road Studios.

== Track listing ==
1. Joey Tempest "Born to Run" (Springsteen) Bruce Springsteen Music
2. John Farnham "A Whiter Shade Of Pale" (Reid/Booker) Onward Music
3. Paul Carrack "No Face, No Name, No Number" (Winwood/Capaldi) Warner Chappell/Island Music
4. Bonnie Tyler "I Put A Spell On You" (Hawkins) EMI Music Publishing
5. Marc Almond "Paint It Black" (Jagger/Richards) Westminster Music/ABKCO Music
6. Mike Batt "Bright Eyes" (Batt) EMI Music Publishing
7. Roger Daltrey "Boys of Summer" (Henley/Campbell) Warner/Chappell Music
8. Lemmy "Eve Of Destruction" (P. F. Sloan) MCA Music Publishing
9. Justin Hayward "Nights In White Satin" (Hayward) Tyler Music
10. Huey Lewis "The Power Of Love" (Lewis/Hayes/Colla) MCA Music Publishing
11. Colin Blunstone "Owner Of A Lonely Heart" (Anderson/Rabin/Squire/Horn) Warner/Chappell/Unforgettable Songs/Carling Music
12. Kim Wilde "Because The Night" (Smith/Springsteen) Zomba Music Publishing
13. Status Quo "Not Fade Away" (Hardin/Petty) Melody Lane Publishers/MPL Communications
14. Midge Ure "Vienna" (Ure/Currie/Allen/Cann) Polygram Music

== Musicians ==
- Royal Philharmonic Orchestra
- Drums: Ray Cooper, Henry Spinetti
- Guitars: Chris Spedding, Mitch Dalton
- Bass Guitar: Tim Harries
- Lead Saxophone: Phil Todd
- Piano: Mike Batt
- Backing vocals: Mike Batt, David Bevan, George Michael, Carol Kenyon, Tessa Niles, Miriam Stockley
