= (I Am) The Seeker =

1983 show tune

"The Seeker" is a song written by ABBA composers Björn Ulvaeus and Benny Andersson towards the end of the group's career. The song was however not recorded by ABBA, but was 'given' by the composers to be included in the 1983 London staging of the originally French musical "Abbacadabra", based on 14 of the group's songs. The lyrics were altered for the show by Don Black and Mike Batt.

The song was performed by singer and actor B. A. Robertson, and recorded for the English language cast album. It was used as the B-side to the single "Time".

The song was re-recorded by Andersson's Orchestra in 2007 with a new chorus and completely new lyrics, as well as a new title "Upp Till Dig", and was performed by Helen Sjöholm.
