= The New Edition (British band) =

British pop band

New Edition
- Genres: Pop music
- Years active: 1974–77
- Labels: Epic
- Past members: Jackie Hall; Ricky Kirwin

The New Edition was a group of singers and dancers, who had a top 5 hit in the UK singles charts with Mike Batt in 1975.

== History ==
The group was put together as regular singers and dancers on the British Broadcasting Corporation show Seaside Special in 1974. By 1976, the troupe had 11 members, seven of whom had been members of previous BBC regulars The Young Generation.

The group was credited for its backing vocals on the Mike Batt single "Summertime City", the Seaside Special theme tune, which peaked at number 4 in the UK singles chart in September 1975. The New Edition (sometimes billed simply as New Edition) released three more singles and an album over the next 2 years, but none made the national charts.
