= The Planets (band) =

Classical crossover music band formed in 2001

The Planets, 2003.

The Planets was a classical crossover music band formed by Mike Batt in 2001. The Planets made their public debut supporting Deep Purple's 2002 UK tour.

The band was made of:

- Ruth Miller (flute)
- Ben Pugsley (electric, classical and flamenco guitars
- Jonathan Hill (violin)
- Anne-Kathrin Schirmer (guitar and clarinet)
- Lac-Hong Phi (cello)
- Salima Williams (oboe)
- Beverley Jones (bass, double bass)
- Michael Kruk (drums, percussion)

== Classical Graffiti ==
Their album Classical Graffiti with 17 tracks made up of original compositions as well as covers of well-known classical themes, all bearing Mike Batt's signature, was released in February 2002. The album went straight to number one on the UK classical music chart on the day of its release and remained there for three months. The album also peaked at number 34 in the UK Albums Chart.

Cover of album Classical Graffiti

Track listing

1. "Rodrigo" (3:26)
2. "Carmen Caprice" (5:57)
3. "Grassland Theme" (3:07)
4. "Classical Graffiti" (3:01)
5. "Love in Slow Motion" (3:12)
6. "Brandenburg Variation" (4:20)
7. "The Journey of a Fool" (4:27)
8. "Clair de Lune" (4:10)
9. "He Moved Through the Fair" (3:39)
10. "Contradanza" (3:11)
11. "A Letter from New England" (4:29)
12. "Bolero" (5:56)
13. "A One Minute Silence" (1:02)
14. "Carmen Caprice" (Acoustic Version) (5:55)
15. "Brandenburg Variation" (Acoustic Version) (4:20)
16. "Bolero Fantasy" (Acoustic Version) (5:56)
17. "Christmas Thingy" (2:54)

Videography

- 2002: "Contradanza"
- 2002: "Rodrigo

== John Cage dispute ==
The track "A One Minute Silence" is entirely silent. The song is credited to Batt/Cage, a reference to John Cage's 4′33″ and the Cage estate sued over royalties, resulting in an out-of-court settlement, although Batt has explained that, while he was inspired by Cage, he credited the track to himself and Clint Cage, a registered pseudonym of his. The court case was later revealed to be a ruse by Batt to stir up a discussion about copyright. The subsequent debate involved a musical duel between The Planets and a clarinettist from Cage’s publishers, with simultaneous performances of the Batt and Cage silences. “Mine is a much better silent piece,” asserted Batt. “I have been able to say in one minute what Cage could only say in four minutes and 33 seconds." The story was brought to a close when Batt made a £1,000 donation to the John Cage Trust, which supports young artists, via Nicholas Riddle, the managing director of Cage's publishers. Batt proposed that it should be an undisclosed amount paid in a sealed envelope on the steps of the high court, giving the impression it was a settlement. Batt claims journalists were shouting out sums, and when they reached six figures, Riddle nodded, either out of mischief or nervousness.
