= Wombling Songs =

Studio album by the Wombles
- Released: February 1974
- Recorded: 1973
- Studio: CBS Studios, Wessex Studios
- Genre: Children's music; bubblegum pop
- Length: 35:29
- Label: CBS
- Producer: Mike Batt

The Wombles chronology
Wombling Songs (1974)	Remember You're a Womble (1974)

Singles from Wombling Songs
- 1. "The Wombling Song" Released: October 1973

Wombling Songs is the first album released by the Wombles. "The Wombling Song" was released as a single. The album was written, arranged and performed by Mike Batt, with vocals credited to "the younger Wombles, assisted by Mike Batt".

== History and reception ==
According to Batt, the album is a simple compilation of character songs and background music for the television series. It has garnered a small cult following in the 21st century, with music journalist Bob Stanley calling it "something of a kid-rock masterpiece, a pre-teen Odessey and Oracle, chock-full of woodwinds, harpsichords, and minor-key McCartney-esque melodies". Staff writers of The Scotsman noted the album's "glimpses of pop sophistication – the clarinet figure in the theme tune, the wistful pop of Orinoco's song "Dreaming In The Sun"...".

In 2022, Batt revealed he destroyed the master tapes of Wombling Songs and the three subsequent Wombles albums, so "people can't fuck with them after I'm gone...if I wanted to go back and change it I would. They aren’t perfection but they are a faithful representation of what I offered to the world in 1974 and 1975."

== Track listing ==
All tracks are written by Mike Batt.

No.	Title	Length
1.	"The Wombling Song - TV Version"	1:47
2.	"Wombles Everywhere"	3:31
3.	"Exercise Is Good For You [Laziness Is Not]"	2:33
4.	"The Wombles Warning"	3:31
5.	"Tobermory"	3:39
6.	"Dreaming In The Sun"	4:12
7.	"Madame Cholet"	3:52
8.	"Great Uncle Bulgaria's March"	3:32
9.	"Wellington Womble"	3:58
10.	"Bungo's Birthday"	2:36
11.	"Wombling Along"	0:56
12.	"The Wombling Song - Full Version"	2:26
Total length:		36:37

== Charts ==
Chart performance for Wombling Songs
Chart (1974)	Peak position
UK Albums (OCC)	19
