= Sheba (song) =

Single by Mike Oldfield

from the album QE2
- A-side: "Wonderful Land"
- Released: 28 November 1980
- Recorded: Denham, 1980
- Genre: Progressive rock
- Length: 3:33
- Label: Virgin
- Songwriter(s): Mike Oldfield
- Producer(s): Mike Oldfield; David Hentschel

Mike Oldfield singles chronology
"Arrival" (1980)	"Sheba" (1980)	"The Singles" (1981)

"Sheba" is a single by musician Mike Oldfield, released in 1980. It is from the album QE2. In many countries the Shadows cover, "Wonderful Land", was the A-side, while the B-side was "Sheba".

Vocals on "Sheba" were performed by Maggie Reilly, and drum parts were played by Phil Collins; Oldfield plays all other instruments. The lyrics to "Sheba" are simply vocalisations set to the backing track.

"Wonderful Land" is an instrumental, and is a cover, originally released as a single by The Shadows in 1962.

== Track listing ==
1. "Sheba" – 3:33
2. "Wonderful Land" (edit) – 2:50

== "Wonderful Land" video ==
The video for "Wonderful Land" again shows Oldfield playing various instruments, including a violin, which he has claimed not to be able to play very well. The video is available on the Elements – The Best of Mike Oldfield video.
