= QE2 (album) =

Studio album by Mike Oldfield
- Released: 31 October 1980
- Recorded: Denham, 1980
- Genre: Progressive rock
- Length: 39:51
- Label: Virgin; Mercury (2012 reissue)
- Producer: David Hentschel, Mike Oldfield

Mike Oldfield chronology
| Platinum (1979) | QE2 (1980) | Five Miles Out (1982) |

Singles from QE2
- 1. "Arrival" Released: 12 September 1980; 2. "Sheba/Wonderful Land" Released: 28 November 1980

Professional ratings
Review scores
| Source | Rating |
|---|---|
| AllMusic | 3/5 stars |

QE2 is the sixth studio album by Mike Oldfield, released in 1980 on Virgin Records. The album was named after the ocean liner Queen Elizabeth 2.

The album contained both original Oldfield compositions as well as two cover versions of pieces recorded by other bands ("Arrival" by ABBA and "Wonderful Land" by The Shadows).

Though only reaching number twelve on the German album charts, the album became the best-selling album of 1981 in Germany.

== Album analysis ==
The longest tracks on the album are "Taurus I" and the title track, "QE2", lasting 10 minutes and 7 minutes respectively. Some years later The Shadows responded to Oldfield's cover of "Wonderful Land", by releasing a cover of Oldfield's "Moonlight Shadow". The cover songs were released as singles.

The album was the first Oldfield album to feature Maggie Reilly as a collaborator. Some tracks on the album feature vocals sung through vocoder. "Conflict" has an excerpt from J. S. Bach's "Badinerie" (the last part of Bach's Orchestral Suite No. 2 in B Minor). The lyrics for "Celt" were written by Tim Cross.

"Molly" was made for his daughter, Molly Oldfield, who would later play keyboards on The Songs of Distant Earth and play a part in the Songs for Survival project.

The European Adventure Tour 1981, which ran from March to August of that year, was in promotion of the album.

== Album title and artwork ==
The album QE2 and its title track "QE2" were named after the then 11-year-old Cunard Line ocean liner Queen Elizabeth 2. The album cover design appears to be a close-up of the front side of the ship, complete with Plimsoll Line in the lower left corner. The first pressing even had a porthole cut out in the sleeve. The inside of the original foldout LP sleeve featured a schematic of one of the Queen Elizabeth 2's decks as well as a stylised picture of her engine; these have not been reprinted in later reissues, except for the 2012 reissue by Mercury Records on CD and LP, which reinstates all the elements of the original artwork with the exception of the cut-out porthole.

== Track listing ==
=== Side one ===
1. "Taurus I" (Mike Oldfield) – 10:16
2. "Sheba" (Oldfield) – 3:33
3. "Conflict" (Oldfield) – 2:53
4. "Arrival" (Benny Andersson, Björn Ulvaeus) – 2:48

=== Side two ===
1. "Wonderful Land" (Jerry Lordan) – 3:38
2. "Mirage" (Oldfield) – 4:41
3. "QE2" (Oldfield, David Hentschel) – 7:38
4. "Celt" (Oldfield, Tim Cross) – 3:06
5. "Molly" (Oldfield) – 1:15

On the original vinyl label of the album, the title piece, "QE2" is listed as two tracks, "QE2" by Oldfield/Hentschel and "QE2 Finale" by Oldfield, but gives their running time as a single piece.

== Reissue ==
The album was re-released by Mercury Records on 30 July 2012. This came as part of a deal in which Oldfield's Virgin albums were transferred to the label. It was released on the same day as Platinum and a year after the last Universal reissue of Incantations.

The first disc is the original recording remastered with bonus material, and the second disc (available in the deluxe edition) is a live concert recorded at the time of the album's original release. The concert was recorded in April 1981 in Essen during Oldfield's European Adventure Tour.

Disc 1

1. "Taurus 1" (2012 remaster) 10:16
2. "Sheba" (2012 remaster) 3:32
3. "Conflict" (2012 remaster) 2:48
4. "Arrival" (2012 remaster) 2:45
5. "Wonderful Land" (2012 remaster) 3:37
6. "Mirage" (2012 remaster) 4:39
7. "QE2" (2012 remaster) 7:37
8. "Celt" (2012 remaster) 3:03
9. "Molly" (2012 remaster) 1:16
10. "Polka" 3:34
11. "Wonderful Land" (Single version) 2:50
12. "Shiva" 3:34

Disc 2 – Live from the European Adventure Tour

1. "Taurus 1" 11:11
2. "Sheba" 3:28
3. "Mirage" 5:01
4. "Conflict" 5:16
5. "Ommadawn" 21:45
6. "Punkadiddle" 5:24
7. "Tubular Bells (Part One)" 18:30
8. "QE2" 4:55
9. "Portsmouth" 2:28

== Charts ==
=== Weekly charts ===
| Chart (1980–1981) | Position |
|---|---|
| Austrian Albums (Ö3 Austria) | 8 |
| Belgian Albums (Ultratop Wallonia) | 196 |
| German Albums (Offizielle Top 100) | 12 |
| Norwegian Albums (VG-lista) | 23 |
| Spanish Albums (Promusicae) | 45 |
| UK Albums (OCC) | 27 |
| US Billboard 200 | 174 |

=== Year-end charts ===
| Chart (1981) | Position |
|---|---|
| German Albums (Offizielle Top 100) | 1 |

== Certifications ==
| Region | Certification | Certified units/sales |
|---|---|---|
| Germany (BVMI) | Gold | 250,000^{^} |
| Spain (Promusicae) | Gold | 50,000^{^} |
| United Kingdom (BPI) | Gold | 100,000^{^} |
^{^} Shipments figures based on certification alone.

== Personnel ==
- Mike Oldfield – electric guitars (all tracks), Spanish guitar ("Arrival", "Wonderful Land"), acoustic guitar ("Mirage"), double-speed guitar ("QE2"), bass guitar (all tracks except "QE2"), mandolin ("Taurus I", "Arrival", "Wonderful Land", "QE2"), banjo & piano ("Taurus I"), Celtic harp ("Taurus I", "Arrival"), bass pedals ("Taurus I", "QE2"), synthesizer ("Taurus I", "Sheba", "Arrival", "Wonderful Land", "Mirage", "QE2", "Celt"), vocoder ("Taurus I", "Sheba", "Arrival", "Mirage", "Molly"), Simmons ClapTrap & drum machine ("Taurus I"), timpani ("Taurus I", "Mirage", "QE2"), syndrums & chair ("Sheba"), African drums ("Sheba", "Arrival", "Wonderful Land"), Aboriginal rhythm sticks & vocals ("Arrival"), marimba ("Wonderful Land"), vibraphone ("Wonderful Land", "Mirage"), bass drum & tambourine & gong & Northumbrian pipes ("QE2")

with

- English Chorale – vocals ("Arrival")
- Guy Barker – trumpet ("Mirage", "QE2")
- Phil Collins – drums ("Taurus I", "Sheba")
- Tim Cross – piano & synthesizers ("Conflict", "Celt")
- Raul D'Olivera – trumpet ("Mirage", "QE2")
- Mike Frye – African drums ("Taurus I", "Conflict", "Celt"), vcoder ("Mirage"), drums ("Mirage"), timpani ("Conflict", "QE2", "Celt"), hi-hat ("Celt"), tambourine ("QE2")
- David Hentschel – synthesizer ("Taurus I", "Arrival", "QE2"), drums ("Arrival", "QE2"), vocals ("Arrival"), horn arrangements ("Mirage", "QE2"), synthesized Yamaha CS-80 steel drum & synthesized French horn ("Wonderful Land")
- Paul Nieman – trombone ("Mirage", "QE2")
- Morris Pert – drums ("Conflict")
- Maggie Reilly – vocals ("Taurus I", "Sheba", "QE2", "Celt")
- Dick Studt – strings ("Wonderful Land")
- Philip Todd – tenor saxophone ("Mirage", "QE2")
- David Bedford – string and choir arrangements ("Arrival")

Technical

- Simon Johnston – assistant engineer
- Peter Greenslade – assistant engineers
- Richard Barrie – technical advice
