= Schizophonia (Mike Batt album) =

Studio album by Mike Batt
- Released: 1977
- Label: Epic
- Producer: Mike Batt

Mike Batt chronology
Yoga for Health (1973)	Schizophonia (1977)	Tarot Suite (1979)

Professional ratings
Review scores
Source	Rating
AllMusic	3/5 stars

Schizophonia is the second solo album by English singer-songwriter Mike Batt, backed with the London Symphony Orchestra. It was released in 1977 by Epic Records.

== Background and content ==
According to Batt, Schizophonia was originally a concept album with the title The Adventures of God and His Pals, with God being like Lord Snooty from The Beano comic magazine. Having started writing songs for that album, Batt thought the theme was "a bit silly", before imagining an Arabic story and then discovering one "about Mohammed the Fifth and the Berber Revolt in the Encyclopædia Britannica."

Schizophonia partly contains a theme of Arabic music, which persuaded film producer Elmo Williams to commission Batt to write the score for the 1978 film Caravans.

== Track listing ==
All tracks written by Mike Batt, except where noted.

Side one

No.	Title	Length
1.	"The Ride to Agadir"	6:40
2.	"Berber's Prayer"	2:03
3.	"The Walls of the World"	3:19
4.	"Insh'Allah"	4:58
5.	"The Fires of Rabat"	2:56

Side two

No.	Title	Writer(s)	Length
1.	"It Seemed Like a Good Idea at the Time"		2:53
2.	"Bourrée"	Johann Sebastian Bach	1:35
3.	"Railway Hotel"		3:21
4.	"Voices in the Dark"		4:04
5.	"Don't Let Me Be Misunderstood"	Bennie Benjamin; Sol Marcus; Horace Ott	4:09

== Personnel ==
Adapted from the album's liner notes.

=== Musicians ===
- Mike Batt – vocals (side one: tracks 1, 3, 4; side two: tracks 1, 3–5), Wurlitzer electric piano (side one: track 3; side two: track 4), ARP synthesizer (side one: track 4; side two: track 4), Clavinet (side one: track 5), arrangement (side two: track 2), keyboards (side two: track 5), accordion (side two: track 5)
- Anthony Camden – oboe (side one: track 1), cor anglais (side two: track 3)
- Clem Cattini – drums (side one: tracks 1, 3, 4; side two: track 1)
- B. J. Cole – pedal steel guitar (side one: tracks 3, 5; side two: track 4)
- Ray Cooper – percussion (side one: tracks 1, 3–5; side two: tracks 1, 3–5)
- Terry Cox – drums (side one: track 5; side two: track 4)
- John Fiddy – bass guitar (side one: track 5; side two: tracks 1, 4)
- Chris Gent – saxophone (side two: track 5)
- Herbie Flowers – bass (side one: track 3)
- Warwick Hill – violin (side one: track 1)
- Les Hurdle – bass (side one: tracks 1, 4)
- Seoud Islam – spoken voice (side one: track 2)
- Kenney Jones – drums (side two: track 5)
- Chris Karan – tablas (side one: tracks 1, 4)
- Rick Kemp – bass (side two: tracks 3, 5)
- Peter Knight – fiddle (side one: track 1)
- London Symphony Orchestra – orchestra (arranged and conducted by Mike Batt)
- Roger McKew – guitar (side one: tracks 1, 3)
- Alan Parker – guitar (side one: tracks 1, 4, 5; side two: track 4)
- Chris Spedding – guitar (side one: tracks 1, 3–5; side two: tracks 1, 3–5)
- Richard Studt – violin (side one: track 1)
- Toose Taylor – guitar solo (side two: track 5)
- Les Thatcher – guitar (side one: track 3)

=== Technical ===
- Mike Batt – producer
- Tim Friese-Greene – principal recording engineer
- Mike Thompson – principal recording engineer
- Michael Hasted – cover paintings
- Peter Lavery – photography
- Maurice Wilson – typography
- Recorded mainly at Wessex Studios, London, England; also at Lansdowne, Olympic & CTS, London, England

== Charts ==
Chart performance for Schizophonia
Chart (1977)	Peak position
Swedish Albums (Sverigetopplistan)	46
