= The Dreamstone =

British animated television series, 1990–1995

- Created by: Michael Jupp
- Written by: Sue Radley; Martin Gates
- Starring: John Franklyn-Robbins; Stuart Lock; Nancy Hendry; Ellie Beaven; Derek Wright; Jacqueline Clarke; Gary Martin; Anthony Jackson; Melvyn Hayes; Richard Tate; Leonard Whiting; Peter Craze; Colin Marsh; Anne Rye; Sheila Steafel; Scarlett Strallen
- Country of origin: United Kingdom
- No. of series: 4
- No. of episodes: 52

Production
- Running time: 22 minutes
- Production companies: Martin Gates Productions; FilmFair

Original release
- Network: ITV (CITV)
- Release: 25 September 1990 – 28 March 1995

The Dreamstone is a British animated television series that aired from 1990 to 1995, with four series and 52 episodes. The series' original concept and artwork was created by Michael Jupp, and it was written by Sue Radley and Martin Gates and produced by Martin Gates Productions (MGP) for a wholly owned subsidiary of Central, a part of Independent Television, and FilmFair. Distribution rights for the Martin Gates catalogue, including The Dreamstone, are currently owned by Monster Entertainment.

The Dreamstone is set in the dream worlds of the Land of Dreams and the Land of Nightmares and follows the struggle between good, personified by The Dream Maker, and evil, personified by Zordrak, Lord of Nightmares.

== Principal characters ==
=== Land of Dreams ===
The Land of Dreams is populated by the humanoid Noops, whose lifestyle is similar to humans, and the Wuts, defenders of the realm who fly around on leaves and use staffs to communicate with each other and ward off Zordrak's forces.

- The Dream Maker (voiced by John Franklyn-Robbins): A wise and elderly wizard responsible for creating and sending dreams to the world.
- Albert (voiced by Richard Tate): The Dream Maker's pet dogfish, who is said to have been created when he saw him in a dream and liked him so much that he decided to make him real. Albert later became the mascot/logo for Martin Gates' production company.
- Rufus (voiced by Stuart Lock): The main protagonist of the series. A Noop who enjoys dreaming so much that he has vivid daydreams, which has caused him to have trouble finding a job. After being fired from the waxworks, Amberley suggests that Rufus apply for the position of the Dream Maker's assistant, which is ideal for him because of his daydreaming. Although his mind often wanders and he tends to get into things he should not, he is creative and imaginative. In the pilot episode he is voiced by Christian Bale.
- Amberley (voiced by Nancy Hendry): Rufus' best friend, who is practical and resourceful. However, her level-headedness is sometimes clouded by her short temper, which sometimes causes her to rush into situations. She was named after Amberley, West Sussex, a village that creator Mike Jupp visited regularly.
- Pildit (voiced by Derek Wright): The leader of the Wuts and a long-time friend of the Dream Maker, who is his most trusted ally and often called upon to defend the Land of Dreams from Zordrak's forces. He teaches Rufus and Amberley how to use the special leaves the Wuts use to fly. Pildit is rather mellow and deadpan, in contrast to his grandmother.
- Wildit (voiced by Jacqueline Clarke): Pildit's grandmother and the leader of the Wut Flying Squadron.
- Spildit (voiced by Ellie Beaven): Wildit's niece, who often gets into trouble and has a friendly rivalry with the Urpneys, often taking pity on them during their less antagonistic moments or unknowingly assisting in their schemes.
- Mr. Blossom (voiced by Anthony Jackson): An elderly Wut and the Dream Maker's gardener, whose dedication to his duty is more important to him than issues like the Dreamstone being stolen.
- Wottles (voiced by Ellie Beaven): Creatures that are similar to Wuts, but are smaller and have furry chests. Their job is to look after the Dream Bottle trees from underground and ensure that they are healthy. Notable Wottles are Hat and Egg, who often accompany Rufus and Amberley on their adventures.
- Planet Dreamstone (voiced by Jacqueline Clarke): A sentient planet that is an authority figure in the Council of Dreammakers and the source of power for all Dreamstones in the universe.

=== Land of Nightmares ===
Zordrak, Lord of Nightmares, first appeared in the pilot episode.

The Land of Nightmares is populated mainly by Urpneys, lizard-like humanoids who live in Viltheed, a mountainous wasteland that Zordrak inhabits. Although all Urpneys in Viltheed are male, female Urpneys do exist, as Urpgor has an aunt and a niece.

- Zordrak (voiced by Gary Martin): The Lord of Nightmares and the main antagonist of the series. Zordrak was once a Dream Maker, but was banished from the council for corrupting dreams into nightmares, after which he transformed into his current form and arrived in Viltheed, vowing vengeance on the Dream Maker. He rarely leaves his throne, instead relying on his henchman to carry out his work; he can also transform into a mist/apparition to leave Viltheed. His initial motive for stealing the stone is to freely send nightmares to the Sleeping World, but he later reveals his intention to use its powers to make himself Lord of the Universe. In Mike Jupp's original draft of the story, Zordrak was known as "Nasta Shelfim", an anagram for "Satan himself", but his name was changed to Zordrak due to the original name being too dark.
- Urpgor (voiced by Leonard Whiting (Series 1–3), Colin Marsh (Series 4)): The chief Urpney scientist, who hates the Urpneys and secretly seeks to take the throne for himself. While his inventions work, they are often hindered by their complexity and reliance on Urpney muscle power to operate them. He is the only Urpney shown to have relatives, having an aunt and a niece, Urpip.
- Sergeant Blob (voiced by Richard Tate): The military leader of the Urpneys, who takes over Operation Dreamstone after the former commanding officer, Captain Crigg, is executed. He usually has Nug and Frizz accompany him on missions, having appointed them his "elite squad" in the pilot episode because they were slow to flee with the others.
- Corporal Frizz (voiced by Melvyn Hayes): An Urpney who gained a position of responsibility because he could not run away as fast as the others. He dislikes Urpgor more than the other Urpneys, and occasionally tries to attack him, notably after meeting his aunt.
- Corporal Nug (voiced by Anthony Jackson): A member of Blob's Urpney squad. Though he can often come across as dimwitted, he is sometimes shown to be more perceptive than the other Urpneys, sometimes suggesting good ideas that are usually taken by Blob and passed off as his own.
- Captain Crigg: The original commander of the Urpneys, who questioned Zordrak's leadership and often fell behind schedule. As a result of his failures, Zordrak banished him to the Pit of No Return, where he was eaten by the Frazznats. After his death, Blob was promoted to the position of commander.
- Argorribles: Incorpereal purple clouds that Zordrak sends each night to deliver nightmares to the sleeping world. While often thwarted by the power of the Dreamstone, with the power of the Nightmare stone, they gain more power and are more likely to bypass the Dreamstone's defences.
- Zarag (voiced by Jacqueline Clarke): Zordrak's sister, who was sealed in a bottle for five hundred years until Nug accidentally releases her and is implied to have been romantically involved with the Dream Maker. She also seeks the Dreamstone, but to wear as a hair accessory rather than to unleash nightmares upon the world. Her last appearance was "The Substitute" where, as part of an arrangement with the Urpneys, she poses as a Dream Maker to corrupt the Noops' dream bottles with Argoribbles in an attempt to steal the Dreamstone.
- Frazznats: Creatures that live in the Pit of No Return and feed on Urpneys.

== Soundtrack ==
The show was notable for its musical score, which was unique among cartoons in that it was performed by a full-size professional orchestra, the London Philharmonic Orchestra. The score, by Mike Batt, was heavily characterised by the use of leitmotifs and thematic variations, particularly in the two main songs used in the series, "Better Than a Dream", which characterised the Noops and the Wuts, and "War Song of the Urpneys", which characterised the Urpneys.

Ozzy Osbourne, Frank Bruno, and Billy Connolly provided lead vocals on the "War Song of the Urpneys" single and album track, although the version heard in the series was mainly sung by composer Mike Batt. Other artists who sang for soundtrack included Bonnie Tyler, who recorded a duet with Mike entitled "Into the Sunset", which was intended to be used as the show's official love song, but went unused. Joe Brown and Gary Glitter performed "The Vile Brothers Mountain Band", which was used in the episode "Albert is Fishnapped".

The TV version of "Better Than a Dream" contained different lyrics than the version included on the soundtrack. The TV version reflected Rufus's personality, with the lyrics "I always dream myself to somewhere else each night" and "I know I dream much more than other people do". The soundtrack version instead has the lyrics "I used to dream myself to someone else each night" and "until I chanced upon this road that led to you", among other changed lyrics. Mike Batt re-recorded the chorus, which was used in the ending credits from the latter half of Series 1 until series 4, in which it was shortened. In 2012, Katie Melua released a version of "Better Than a Dream".

The soundtrack was re-released as part of the Mike Batt Music Cube release in December 2009 by Dramatico Records. However, instead of the TV soundtrack, the CD featured five newly recorded orchestral overtures, as well as "Better Than a Dream", "The War Song of the Urpneys", "Into the Sunset", and a shorter version of "The Dreamdance", which omits the vocal clips from the show. "The Vile Brothers Mountain Band" was omitted from the soundtrack due to the controversy surrounding Gary Glitter.

TV soundtrack album listing (original release):

1. "Better Than a Dream" - Mike Batt (3:04)
2. "The War Song of the Urpneys" - Billy Connolly, Ozzy Osbourne and Frank Bruno (4:44)
3. "Dreamdance (Theme from The Dreamstone)" (10:07)
4. "Into the Sunset" - Mike Batt and Bonnie Tyler (3:28)
5. "The Vile Bros Mountain Band" - Joe Brown and Gary Glitter (4:19)
6. "The Dreamstone (Main Title)" (2:10)
7. "Wack's Wicks Works" (2:15)
8. "The Dream Maker" (6:11)
9. "Whirlyped Launch" (5:21)
10. "The Dreamstone Is Stolen" (6:20)
11. "The Argorribles and the Egg of Death" (6:48)
12. "Rufus Succeeds" (5:20)

TV soundtrack album listing (Music Cube re-release):

1. "Better Than a Dream" - Mike Batt (3:08)
2. "The War Song of the Urpneys" - Billy Connolly, Ozzy Osbourne, and Frank Bruno (4:47)
3. "Dreamdance (Edited Version)" (4:53)
4. "Into the Sunset" - Mike Batt and Bonnie Tyler (3:32)
5. "Dreamstone Overture no.1" (6:57)
6. "Dreamstone Overture no.2" (4:48)
7. "Dreamstone Overture no.3" (5:31)
8. "Dreamstone Overture no.4" (4:49)
9. "Dreamstone Overture no.5" (4:03)
- This is not the only track to be called Dreamstone Overture no.5. The "Better Than a Dream" 7-inch vinyl and CD single versions features the track "Dreamstone Overture no.5", which is different from the Music Cube re-release and is an orchestral version of "Into the Sunset", while the Dreamstone Overtures on the Music Cube re-release are selections of orchestral tracks from the original series. The "Dreamstone Overture no.5" present on the single has a runtime of 6:48.

The Dreamstone soundtrack is currently out of print as of 2015. However, the five Overture tracks from the Music Cube re-release are included on Mike Batt's album A Classical Tale, released on CD on 24 July 2015 by Dramatico Records.

== Home media releases and online distribution ==
In the United Kingdom, there were several video releases from the Video Collection, covering all of series 1, including the unedited opening special, except for the episode "Megattack", as well as several releases of most episodes from Series 1 from Tring Video UK. BMG Video UK released one video release, which featured four episodes from Series 2.

The first two episodes were originally combined as one episode, the opening special, which contained extra footage that was removed from the 22-minute TV version of the special. The first six episodes of the series were released on DVD in the UK by Abbey Home Media, when the rights to the show were owned by Cookie Jar Entertainment, but these two volumes have since gone out of print. The company's Jaroo website used to stream episodes from the first two series.

There were six video releases by Australian company Reel Entertainment, which was released in Australia and featured the first 12 episodes of Series 3. There was also another video release by Video Distributors International in 1992, which featured the first three episodes of Series 1.

In the United States, Fisher-Price released a video release of The Dreamstone.

Pidax Film released the first 13 episodes on DVD in Germany, with English and German audio, on 23 February 2018. Series 2 was released on 18 May 2018. Series 3 was released on 27 July 2018, and Series 4 was released on 28 September 2018.,

The first series was available in the UK through Amazon Prime, but lacked the series finale, "Megattack". Since 2020, however, the episodes are no longer available on Amazon. iTunes has added the first 12 episodes to their service.

In late 2018, Monster Entertainment began the "Official Dreamstone" channel on YouTube and uploaded all 52 episodes, but in June 2019, they set most of the episodes to "private". As of January 2020, they have been re-uploaded.

In September 2022, the series was released on PZAZ TV Worldwide.

== Production ==
Although the show was produced in the United Kingdom, it was animated in the Philippines. As with American produced cartoons, Martin Gates Productions used foreign studios for the overall animation work. Fil-Cartoons, owned by Hanna-Barbera, did animation for series 1, while Moving Images International did animation for series 2–4.

In 1985, Mike Jupp and Martin Gates produced a pilot for the series, The Dream Thief. It was animated by the studio Mill Valley Animation in Novato, California, when Mike was working in America. The pilot has several differences from the TV series, most of which came from Jupp's original manuscript for the idea, and featured a 12-year-old Christian Bale as the voice of Rufus.

== Merchandise and other media ==
In 1991, London Edition published a comic book series based on episodes from the series. The first issue consisted entirely of screenshots, while the next five featured art drawn by Tim Perkins. The comic ran for six issues and adapted plotlines from the episodes "The Dreamstone/Into Viltheed", "The Daydream Bubble", "Albert Is Fishnapped", "The Knitted Balloon", "The Shrinking Stone", and "The Invisible Blob".

BMI (Print Division) Ltd. released a board game based on The Dreamstone in 1993, containing The Dreamstone Game, which involved rolling to move and collecting pieces of the Dreamstone, and Dream Chase, a variant of Snakes and Ladders. A jigsaw puzzle depicting the Dream Maker, Rufus, Amberley, and Albert walking through the Noops' town was also produced, along with other puzzles produced by British puzzle/board game manufacturer Waddingtons.

In October 2019, Oakbound Studio announced that it would produce a licensed miniatures range and game based on The Dreamstone to mark its 30th anniversary. The role-playing game, miniatures game, and a range of 27 initial collectable figurines based on the show were funded through Kickstarter and released on Oakbound's website in July 2021. Zordrak was also announced as a second Kickstarter project launching in December 2022, with a third miniatures release and supplement to the games being planned for 2022.
