= Jack Rothstein =

Polish-born English violinist (1925–2001)

Jack Rothstein (15 December 1925 – 16 November 2001) was a Polish-born violinist and conductor, living most of his life in England.

== Biography ==
=== Background ===
Rothstein was born in Warsaw, Poland, and moved to Mandatory Palestine with his family at the age of two. Later on, he was sent to live with his aunt in Cairo, Egypt, and attended a French school. During this time, he also started his music studies.

During World War II, Rothstein joined the British Army as a musician and performed in the Middle and Far East. Following the war, Rothstein settled in London. He married Linn Hendry.

=== Education ===
Rothstein studied at the Guildhall School of Music in the early 1950s, and took part in master classes by Sascha Lasserson, Leonid Kogan, Felix van Dyl and Henryk Szeryng. In the 1954 Carl Flesch Competition, Rothstein won the second prize.

=== Career ===
Rothstein co-led Yehudi Menuhin's Bath Festival Orchestra, the Boyd Neel Orchestra, and the Northern Sinfonia; he also led the Academy of St Martin in the Fields. As a conductor, Rothstein toured extensively with the Johann Strauss Orchestra and his own ensemble the Viennese Orchestra of London. For over 20 years, Rothstein was also a member of the London Czech Trio, in addition to other music ensembles, performing among others at The Dorchester and for the BBC.

Throughout his professional career, Rothstein also performed as a soloist, playing most of the well-known violin concertos with leading orchestras and giving solo recitals, appearing at the Royal Festival Hall and the Barbican Hall on various occasions.

In addition to his classical music career, Rothstein recorded many background tracks for film and television, including such British TV series as Birds of a Feather, The House of Elliot, Last of the Summer Wine, and Soldier, Soldier. He also played the violin on The Beatles songs "I Am the Walrus" and "Within You Without You"

=== Discography ===
Rothstein recorded versions of Tchaikovsky's Trio in A Minor, Sibelius's Voces intimae, and string quartets by Nielsen, Grieg and Sibelius. He also released a version of Schubert's Trout Quintet and numerous pieces of Viennese classicism. The Music Trade Association twice awarded him prizes for "Orchestral Record of the Year".
