= Eddie Mordue =

British musician

Edwin "Eddie" Mordue (5 January 1928 – 26 January 2011) was a British jazz saxophonist whose career spanned 70 years.

Born in South Shields in January 1928, Edwin Mordue moved to London in 1941 aged 13 and toured with Archie's Juvenile Band. During the Second World War, he played tenor saxophone with the Eric Winstone Band, where he met singer Julie Dawn, whom he married in 1950. The couple went on to record and perform with Frank Sinatra, Gene Kelly and Sammy Davis Jr. Mordue joined the Jack Nathan Band in 1951, a regular at the London Palladium and the emerging West End jazz scene, then worked as a freelance, loaning his sound to the benefit of Nat King Cole, Judy Garland, and Billie Holiday's last concert.

Many recordings followed in the 1960s, including tracks with Dusty Springfield, Alexis Korner and Shirley Bassey. Mordue remarried in 1967, and his wife, Gudrun, bore him three sons.

During the 1970s, Mordue played on a number of television shows, including Top of the Pops, The Generation Game, The Two Ronnies, The Morecambe and Wise Show The Eurovision Song Contest, The Royal Variety Performance, and Roy Castle's Record Breakers, on which Mordue played the world's smallest sopranino saxophone. He was also a member of The Wombles.

Mordue recorded on a number of film soundtracks, including The Pink Panther with Henry Mancini and the James Bond films with John Barry. The Talk Of The Town was also a regular gig, and he played with Ronnie Hazelhurst's band on television theme tunes such as Only Fools and Horses, The Fall and Rise of Reginald Perrin, and Last of the Summer Wine, amongst others.

In his later years, Mordue performed in concert halls and theatres on tour with the Ted Heath and Glenn Miller tribute bands.

Mordue died in January 2011.
