= The Wombles (band) =

British novelty pop group

- Origin: Wimbledon Common, London, England
- Genres: Novelty; bubblegum pop; pop rock
- Years active: 1973–1976, 1994–2001, 2010–2017, 2024
- Labels: CBS Records, Dramatico
- Past members: Mike Batt; Chris Spedding; Les Hurdle; Clem Cattini; Simon Chandler-Honnor; Paul Peabody; Rex Morris; Jack Rothstein; Eddie Mordue; Robin Le Mesurier

The Wombles were a British novelty pop group, featuring musicians dressed as the characters from the children's TV show The Wombles, which in turn was based on the children's book series by Elisabeth Beresford. Songwriter and record producer Mike Batt wrote and also performed many commercially successful singles and albums as 'The Wombles', including the TV series' theme tune. British Hit Singles & Albums jokingly referred to them as the "furriest (and possibly the tidiest) act... are natives of Wimbledon Common, London". In 2011, the band played at The Glastonbury Festival.

== History ==
Filmfair acquired the television rights to The Wombles and commissioned Batt to write the theme song. He waived the flat fee for writing a single song and instead secured the rights to write songs under the name 'The Wombles'.

The band released several albums and singles. All four studio albums went gold, and four of the singles reached the Top 10 in the UK Singles Chart. The Wombles were the most successful music act of 1974 in the UK, with singles in the UK charts for more weeks than any other act.

A song called "Wombling U.S.A.", written specifically to break into the American market, was recorded in 1975 but was not released until 2000 when it was included on the cassette version of "I Wish It Could Be a Wombling Merry Christmas Every Day". However, a previous single entitled, "Wombling Summer Party" which was also written specifically to try to break into the American market charted on the USA Billboard Hot 100 Charts, peaking at No. 55 during August 1974.

== Live performances ==
In January 1974 Batt appeared on an edition of Cilla Black's BBC television series as Orinoco, having been accompanied onstage by guest Bernard Cribbins, to plug "The Wombling Song". Consequently, when the single charted, the "band" were invited to perform on Top of the Pops. Additional Womble suits of the other main characters were hastily made for the live performance.

When appearing as a band, the Wombles were always played by experienced musicians dressed in full costume. Batt continued to perform as Orinoco, regularly accompanied by drummer Clem Cattini dressed as Bungo and guitarist Chris Spedding dressed as Wellington. Both had previously recorded with Batt. On one edition of Top of the Pops, the costumes were filled by members of Steeleye Span.

Tim and Andy Renton, who had worked with Batt in the latter incarnation of Hapshash and the Coloured Coat also donned the costumes, along with Robin Le Mesurier, who was later expelled from the band following his arrest for possession of cannabis.

The band appeared as the interval act at the Eurovision Song Contest 1974, staged at the Brighton Dome, at which ABBA became internationally known after winning.

== The Wombles' split and Wellington's solo career ==
The Wombles 'split' in 1976 and, following a severe drought that summer, a single called "Rainmaker" (credited solely to Wellington Womble rather than the entire band) was released.

== Legacy ==
Although Batt was sensitive about the legacy of the band for a long time, more recently he has talked of their music with pride. In a 2008 interview, he said: "It is hard to be taken seriously with the Wombles hanging around my neck like a furry anvil." In a programme with Aled Jones on the BBC in 2010 Batt pointed out that, in balance, the Wombles also served as a "furry balloon" as it gave him his first chart success. In 2021, interviewed by Mark Ellen and David Hepworth, Batt stated: "I kept the momentum going by changing the style of the records. I used it as an exercise in teaching myself to arrange music...The Wombles were perfect for me because the very necessity to have to change from single to single, style to style...meant I could be as adventurous as I wanted. It was uncool but it was fun, and fun is often uncool...People remember it now with a lot more affection than I got for it at the time."

In 2022, Batt revealed that he had destroyed the multitrack tapes from The Wombles' recording sessions so that the band's music could not be remixed after his death.

== Glastonbury Festival ==
The Wombles played the Avalon tent at the Glastonbury Festival in June 2011 with Chris Spedding joining them as a guest guitarist for the final song. Michael Eavis, the founder of the Glastonbury Festival, had said that booking the Wombles was "a bit of a mistake". Batt quipped that Uncle Bulgaria had been offended by Eavis' comments and had withdrawn an offer to tidy up the site after the festival.

== Personnel ==
=== The Wombles ===
- Orinoco (Mike Batt) – vocals, piano
- Wellington (Chris Spedding) – lead guitar
- Tomsk (Les Hurdle) – bass
- Bungo (Clem Cattini) – drums, percussion
- Tobermory (Simon Chandler-Honnor) – piano, keyboards
- Madame Cholet (Rex Morris) – saxophone
- Great Uncle Bulgaria (Paul Peabody) – violin

=== Additional personnel ===
- Amy Adkins – percussion, violin, vocals
- Eric Bulger – keyboards, saxophone, vocals
- Richard Kingston – keyboards, percussion, vocals
- Simon DeMarco - the local postie, Band PA
- Morgan Kent - Drums [Top of The Pops 1974]

== Parodies ==
The BBC Four comedy program Don't Watch That, Watch This showed a dubbed footage of The Wombles from TOTP2, of the Wombles purportedly performing "Anarchy in the U.K." live in June 1988. The scrolling caption during the song read "During the early eighties the Wombles reformed as a funk soul fusion. But the project soon failed and the group disbanded, only to come together again as the Dixie Minstrel Wombles. In 1988 the original line up were reunited for the third time to record their version of this Sex Pistols classic.... for a Pot Noodle commercial. Later released as a single it reached 57 on the charts".

The comedy film The Rutles featured a Ringo Starr-inspired character named Barrington Womble who "shortened his name to save time...he simply became Barry Wom."

The Yorkshire-based comedy folk band The Bar-Steward Sons of Val Doonican parodied Remember You're A Womble to poke fun at a host of British and American celebrities and politicians, including Donald Trump, Kanye West, Michael Gove and Jeremy Clarkson amongst others. A rather tongue-in-cheek representation of the anti-celebrity in the form of The Cockwombling Song was recorded for their independently released eighth album. Lead singer Scott Doonican, in a local radio interview, stated that "Mike Batt was the soundtrack to my childhood. He was, in my mind, the English equivalent of Brian Wilson. I think many of his generation initially, unfairly, wrote him off as a novelty, but he could actually play and arrange at a staggering level, and that really excited me as a young musician. He wasn't just knocking out 'novelty' songs, they were beautifully crafted vignettes and the number of hits The Wombles had cemented that fact, and hammered it home that Batt was one of the best songwriters our country had to offer".
