= Mike Batt =

English singer-songwriter and director (born 1949)

Mike Batt LVO
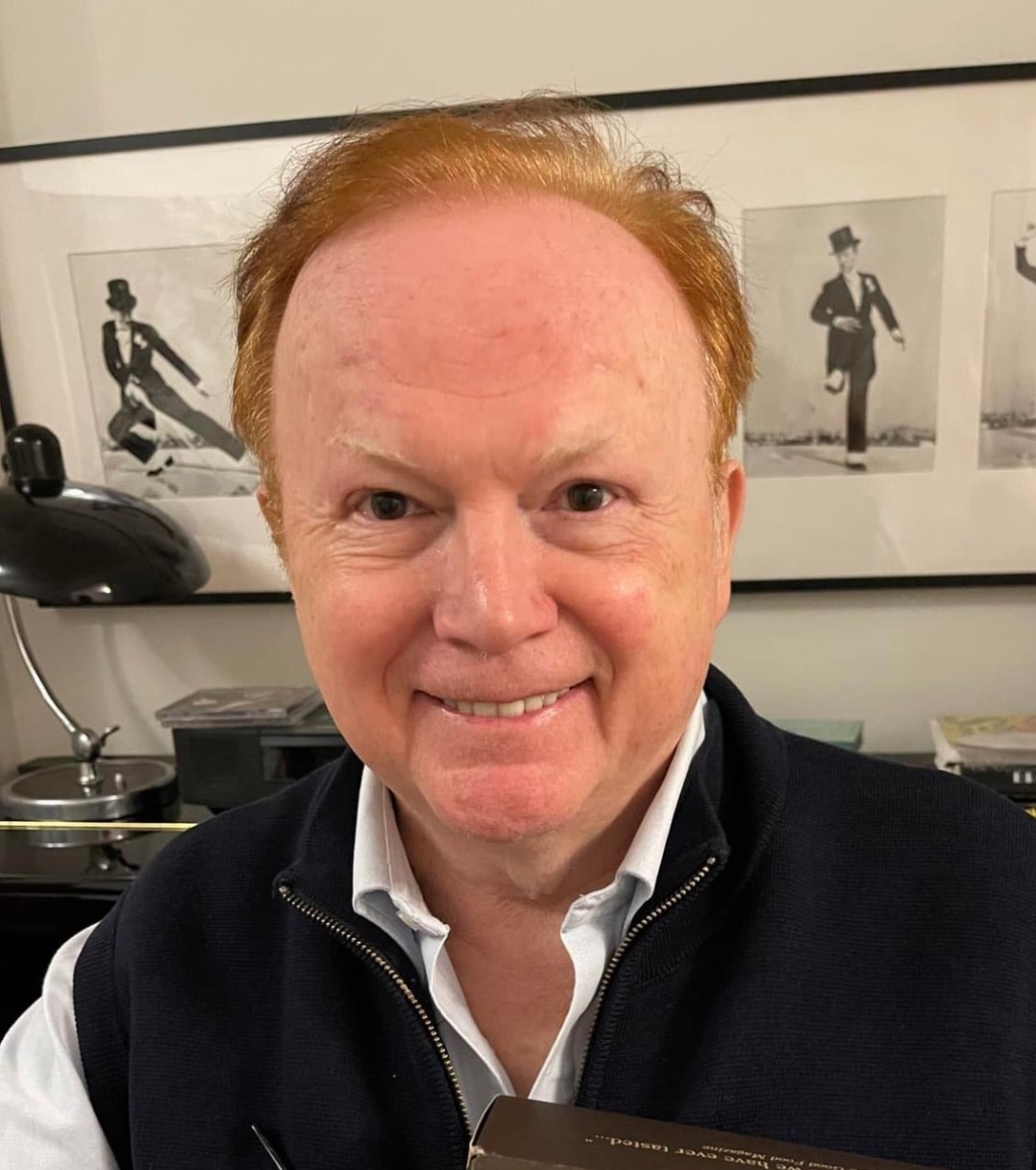
- Mike Batt in 2024

Background information
- Born: Michael Philip Batt; 6 February 1949 (age 77); Southampton, England
- Genres: Rock; pop; classical
- Occupations: Singer-songwriter; musician; record producer; arranger; director; conductor
- Instruments: Vocals; piano; guitar; keyboards
- Years active: 1969–present
- Labels: Epic; Sony; Dramatico
- Website: mikebatt.com

Michael Philip Batt (born 6 February 1949) is an English singer-songwriter, musician, arranger, record producer, director, and conductor. He served as the Deputy Chairman of the British Phonographic Industry.

Batt created the novelty pop band the Wombles, after recording the theme song for the animated BBC series of the same name. He also composed the song "Bright Eyes" for the 1978 animated film Watership Down. Batt promoted the early career of singer Katie Melua after signing her to his label, Dramatico. He wrote, arranged and produced her debut album Call Off the Search and her following two albums.

Batt has conducted the London Symphony, Royal Philharmonic, London Philharmonic, Sydney Symphony and Stuttgart Philharmonic.

== Early life ==
Michael Philip Batt was born in Southampton, England, and attended Peter Symonds School, in Winchester.

== Career ==
Batt began his career in pop music when he was 18 by answering an advertisement placed by Ray Williams in the New Musical Express on behalf of Liberty Records. He was initially signed as a songwriter and artist to Liberty, but at the age of 19 became the head of A&R for the label.

He signed and produced Tony (TS) McPhee's band, the Groundhogs and produced their first album, Scratching the Surface. He produced, co-wrote and played piano on Hapshash and the Coloured Coat's second album, Western Flier. Additionally, in 1969, Batt was credited as producer/artist on a Liberty single covering the Beatles' "Your Mother Should Know".

=== 1970s ===
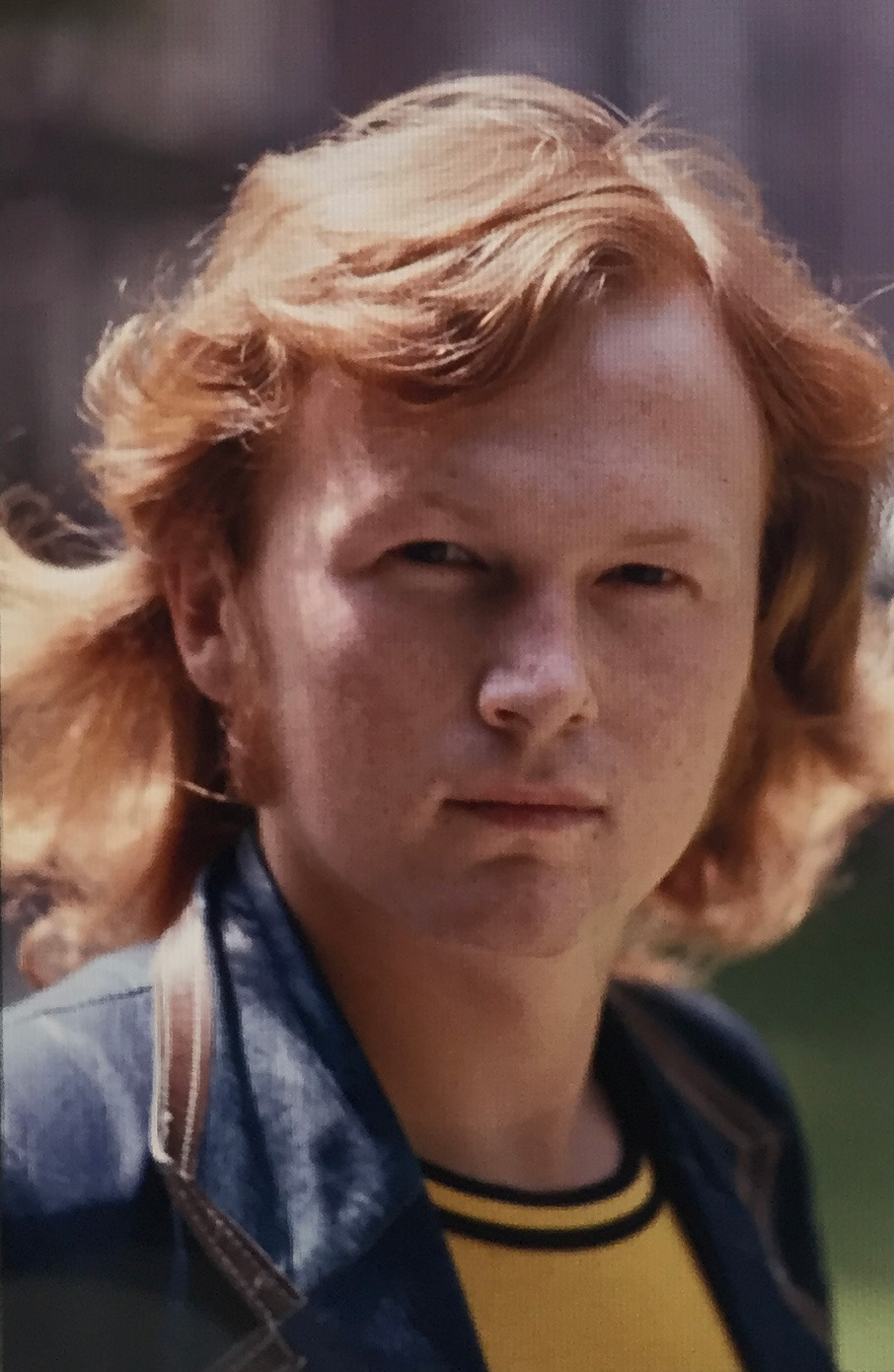
Mike Batt in 1970

In the early 1970s, Batt was asked by the producers of a new children's television programme to write the theme music. Instead of taking his £200 fee, Batt asked for the character rights for musical production. He produced his first hits as a singer-songwriter/producer with the Wombles in 1974. The collaboration resulted in eight singles and albums that achieved gold certification.

Batt worked with various artists as a songwriter and producer, including Steeleye Span on their album All Around My Hat (1975). Also in 1975, at the end of the summer, he entered the UK Singles Chart with the only hit under his own name "Summertime City" (credited to "Mike Batt with the New Edition"). The song, used as the theme music for the BBC series Seaside Special, reached number 4.

Batt produced Elkie Brooks' version of "Lilac Wine" in 1978. The song was a hit in the UK and across Europe. He also wrote the song "Bright Eyes" for the animated film version of Watership Down. Recorded by Art Garfunkel, it reached the number 1 spot on the UK Singles Chart and was number 1 in six countries. Batt also wrote the score for the film Caravans, released in 1978.

=== 1980s ===
As a singer, Batt's solo albums included Schizophonia and Tarot Suite (1979, Epic Records) (both with the London Symphony Orchestra). From these albums came the European hit songs "Railway Hotel", "Lady of the Dawn" and "Ride to Agadir". He worked on these recordings with such fellow artists as Colin Blunstone and Roger Chapman as singers on Tarot Suite. A version of "Introduction (The Journey of a Fool)" from Tarot Suite was used as the theme for the Sydney radio station Triple M, from its first broadcast in 1980 until the 1990s. Over the course of May 2010, this theme tune, still based on the main central riff from "Introduction (The Journey of a Fool)" was re-recorded by Slash, former Guns N' Roses guitarist, as a new theme to mark the 30th anniversary of Triple M in Sydney. This was released to air at the end of June 2010.

In 1980, Batt released the solo album Waves, recorded at Wisseloord Studios in Hilversum, Netherlands. In the same year, he sailed with his family aboard his boat, Braemar, ending up in Australia after two and a half years, travelling via France, the West Indies, South America, Central America, Mexico, Los Angeles, Hawaii and Fiji.

In 1981, on the Los Angeles–Sydney leg of the sea voyage, he was commissioned to write a piece for the 50th anniversary of the Australian Broadcasting Corporation which became the musical fantasy production Zero Zero. Batt designed, co-directed and starred in the studio-based production of Zero Zero shot at Gore Hill studios in Sydney and aired by Channel 4 TV in the UK in the week of the channel's broadcast launch in 1982. The album, featuring Batt with the Sydney Symphony Orchestra, was released on Epic as a Mike Batt solo album. Batt's character Number 17 falls in love and is sent to an emotional decontamination centre called Zero Zero. The single, "Love Makes You Crazy", was released by Sony on Epic Records.

Returning to the UK in 1983, Batt wrote, produced and arranged three more Top Ten hits, "Please Don't Fall in Love" (for Cliff Richard), "A Winter's Tale" (for David Essex, with lyrics co-written by Tim Rice) and "I Feel Like Buddy Holly" (for Alvin Stardust). In the same year, he helped write lyrics for Abbacadabra. In 1983, he wrote and produced "Ballerina (Prima Donna)", which, recorded by Steve Harley, peaked at number 51 in the UK.

With Richard Stilgoe, Batt co-wrote the lyrics to the title song of Andrew Lloyd Webber's "Phantom of the Opera", producing and arranging the single by Steve Harley and Sarah Brightman. Batt's and Stilgoe's lyrics were later partially replaced by those of Charles Hart. Batt's arrangement of the song is still used in the stage version.

The album The Hunting of the Snark, based on Lewis Carroll's poem, was recorded in 1984. However, the album was withheld from sale after a dispute with Sony Music, to whom Batt had leased the self-financed masters. Batt went ahead with a promotional concert at the Royal Albert Hall in 1987, which he filmed at his own expense and was shown on BBC2.

In the late 1980s, Batt also produced, arranged and conducted Justin Hayward's album with the London Philharmonic Orchestra entitled Classic Blue and the music for The Dreamstone. A number of stars performed for the Dreamstone soundtrack; including Billy Connolly, Ozzy Osbourne, former British heavyweight boxing champion Frank Bruno, and Bonnie Tyler. Batt performed the programme's theme song, "Better Than A Dream". The first series was completed and broadcast in 1990 and lasted for three more series, ending in 1995.

=== 1990s ===
In January 1990, Batt was appointed joint musical director of the Melbourne Summer Music Festival with the State Orchestra of Victoria. Among the classical concerts and other programming he conducted, curated and performed on that visit to Australia, he programmed another costumed concert, The Hunting of the Snark, with narration by Michael Parkinson and the Bellman played by Keith Michell. On a second visit that year, Batt took the opportunity to mount a more ambitious version of the fully expanded show score at the Hills Centre in Castle Hill and at the State Theatre, Sydney. Having tried out the show in Australia, Batt moved towards securing funding and a theatre to mount the show in London's West End, and subsequently did so at the Prince Edward Theatre, opening on 24 October 1991.

The production was designed and directed by Batt and starred Philip Quast as the Bellman, David McCallum as Lewis Carroll, and Kenny Everett as the Billiard Marker. There was a 50 piece live orchestra on stage, hidden variously by venetian blinds and gauzes upon which the scenery was projected entirely from more than 200 projectors and involved 12,000 hand-prepared still slides often moving in rapid succession to create animation. This visual technique had been developed by Batt over the years since the launch of his first solo album Schizophonia and had been used in his Zero Zero TV production of 1982. The show ran for seven weeks at the Prince Edward Theatre.

In 1995, Batt made a solo album for Sony Germany, Arabesque. Batt was then commissioned to write the official anthem for the inauguration of the Channel Tunnel by the Queen, entitled "When Flags Fly Together". This was performed for the Queen and President Mitterrand, along with many senior politicians, by The Band of the Royal Engineers, and sung by Robert Meadmore.

Batt composed and produced the four million-selling album The Violin Player, which launched classical violinist Vanessa-Mae (EMI Classics, 1995) from which the top twenty single of his arrangement of J.S. Bach's "Toccata and Fugue" was taken.

In 1997, the year of Queen Elizabeth II and Prince Philip's golden wedding anniversary, he was commissioned by the military to compose a piece, "Royal Gold," for the massed bands of the Coldstream, Welsh, Irish, and Grenadier Guards, together with 100 pipers. The piece was performed in the presence of The Queen and Prince Philip at the Royal Tournament that year. Batt simultaneously dedicated the piece to his own parents, whose golden wedding anniversary happened to be in the same year.

The same year, Batt produced an album for the soprano Anna Maria Kaufmann, with the Royal Philharmonic Orchestra; an original dramatic song cycle called Blame It on the Moon, from which his song, "Running with a Dream" was taken as the theme for Germany's national football team at the 1998 World Cup.

In 1998, Batt produced, arranged and conducted the album Philharmania with the Royal Philharmonic and guest singers included Joey Tempest, Roger Daltrey, Marc Almond, Bonnie Tyler, Status Quo, Huey Lewis, Kim Wilde, Justin Hayward and others. Later the same year, Batt relaunched The Wombles pop group, with two hits, "Remember You’re A Womble" and "The Wombling Song". In 2000, he collaborated with Roy Wood for a single which combined new versions of previous Christmas hits by Wizzard and The Wombles, released as "I Wish It Could Be a Wombling Merry Christmas".

Later, he composed, arranged and conducted the music for the 1999 TV series Watership Down with the Royal Philharmonic Orchestra. A soundtrack album starring Stephen Gately from Boyzone, Paul Carrack from Mike and the Mechanics, Cerys Matthews from Catatonia and the RPO was recorded but, owing to disagreements with the record label, was never released and subsequently acquired by Batt for his Dramatico label some years later. His orchestral suite "Watership Down" was recorded with the RPO at this time and was released on Dramatico, in a 2 CD set with the soundtrack to Caravans.

Also, for the 1999 release of XTC's album Apple Venus Volume 1, he wrote the orchestral arrangements for the tracks "Green Man" and "I Can't Own Her".

=== 2000s onwards ===
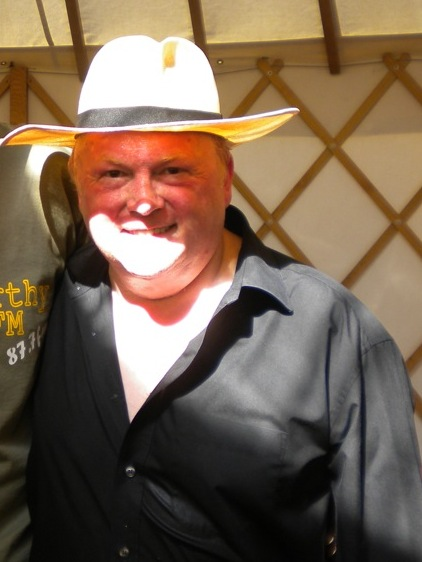
Batt in 2011

After conceiving and co-creating the all-girl string quartet, Bond, and producing their first single, he then created the eight-piece classical crossover band, the Planets. Their album Classical Graffiti was released in February 2002. It went to number one in the UK classical music chart on the day of release and remained there for three months.

Batt agreed to pay an undisclosed six-figure out-of-court settlement to the John Cage Trust after featuring a silent track on Classical Graffiti co-credited to Cage.

He formed his own record label, Dramatico, in 2000, working with a small group of artists including Katie Melua, Carla Bruni, Marianne Faithfull, Caro Emerald, Gurrumul, and Sarah Blasko. Batt discovered Katie Melua in 2002 while scouting for a new artist with whom to work. Melua's album Call Off The Search (containing six of Batt's songs including "The Closest Thing to Crazy") was released on Dramatico in November 2003.

After six weeks at number one in the UK Albums Chart, it sold six times platinum. Over 1.8 million copies were sold in the UK and three million copies worldwide, making Melua the biggest selling UK female artist of 2004. Her second album, Piece by Piece (including Batt's song "Nine Million Bicycles") was released in September 2005, and sold 3.5 million copies in Europe, going to number one in the UK, The Netherlands, Norway, Denmark, Iceland, and hitting top five chart positions in eight other countries. At this point, Melua had become the biggest female UK album artist in the world for that year according to official British Phonographic Industry sales figures.

In 2008, Batt performed and released A Songwriter's Tale, a compilation album of his hits, newly recorded with the Royal Philharmonic Orchestra, Henry Spinetti, Ray Cooper, Chris Spedding, Mitch Dalton and Tim Harries. The album reached number 24 in the UK albums chart. In 2011, his record label, Dramatico, released the album Deleted Scenes From the Cutting Room Floor by Caro Emerald, reaching more than 400,000 UK sales and paving the way for the release of The Shocking Miss Emerald by the same artist in 2013. This album went to number one in the UK album charts.

Melua departed Dramatico in January 2014 after a ten-year contract, during which she had recorded six albums for them.

In 2018, he produced and arranged Hawkwind's album The Road to Utopia, consisting primarily of new versions of their 1970s songs with a guest appearance from Eric Clapton. He arranged and conducted a series of concerts of Hawkwind songs featuring the band and orchestra in October and November 2018.

In September 2018, the GUILD classical label released a recording of 'Holst: The Planets Suite for Large Orchestra' played by the Royal Philharmonic Orchestra and conducted by Batt. The release coincided with the centenary of the composition's first performance.

In 2022, Batt launched Croix-Noire, an art project with Jean-Charles Capelli, intended to link music, comics and video games.

In 2025, Batt worked with Justin Hayward to cover "Life in a Northern Town", released on March 14.

== Personal life ==
In August 2014, Batt was one of 200 public figures who were signatories to a letter to The Guardian expressing their hope that Scotland would vote to remain part of the United Kingdom in September's referendum on that issue.

== Honours and awards ==
Batt has served on the boards of The Performing Right Society, the British Academy of Songwriters, Composers and Authors (BASCA) and the British Phonographic Industry (BPI), being Deputy Chairman of the BPI from 2007 until November 2015. He has been a member of the Society of Distinguished Songwriters (SODS) since 1976. His awards include five Ivor Novello Awards issued by The British Academy Of Songwriters, Composers And Authors, according to their records.

Batt was appointed Lieutenant of the Royal Victorian Order (LVO) in the 2013 Birthday Honours for services to the Royal Household.

In July 2019, Batt was made a Companion of the Liverpool Institute for Performing Arts by co-founder Paul McCartney.

== Discography ==
MBO – The Mike Batt Orchestra (1970–1972)

- 1970: Batt Tracks
- 1971: Portrait of The Rolling Stones
- 1971: Portrait of Elton John
- 1971: Portrait of Simon & Garfunkel
- 1971: Portrait of Bob Dylan
- 1972: Portrait of Cat Stevens
- 1972: Portrait of George Harrison
- 1974: Portrait of Mike Batt (Sampler 1971–1972)

The Wombles (1973–1978)

- 1973: Wombling Songs
- 1974: Remember You're a Womble
- 1974: Keep On Wombling
- 1975: Superwombling
- 1978: Wombling Free (Soundtrack)
- 2011: The W Factor
- 2024: Golden (50th Anniversary Celebration)

Synthesonic Sounds (1973)

- 1973: Moog at the Movies
- 1974: Ye Olde Moog

Mike Batt (Since 1973)

- 1973: Yoga for Health
- 1977: Schizophonia
- 1979: Tarot Suite
- 1980: Waves
- 1981: Six Days in Berlin
- 1982: Zero Zero
- 1988: Songs of Love and War
- 1995: Arabesque

Compilations / Reissues

- 1991: The Very Best of Mike Batt
- 1992: The Winds of Change: Mike Batt Greatest Hits
- 1999: The Ride to Agadir – Best (1977–1983)
- 2008: A Songwriter's Tale
- 2008: A Songwriter's Tale (Special Edition with DVD)
- 2009: Waves / Six Days in Berlin
- 2009: Songs of Love / Arabesque
- 2009: Schizophonia / Tarot Suite
- 2009: Zero Zero (Special Edition with DVD)
- 2009: The Hunting of The Snark (Special Edition with DVD)
- 2009: Caravans / Watership Down Orchestral Suite
- 2009: The Dreamstone / Rapid Eye Movement
- 2009: A Songwriter's Tale /The Orinoco Kid
- 2015: A Classical Tale – Compilation of some released and unreleased classical compositions
- 2020: The Penultimate Collection – Compilation of 34 released and 2 brand new recordings

Musicals

- 1982: Zero Zero (with Sydney Symphonic Orchestra)
- 1987: The Hunting of the Snark (with Friends and London Symphony Orchestra)

Soundtracks

- 1974–1975: Simon in the Land of Chalk Drawings – for the same-titled animated series
- 1978: Wombling Free
- 1978: Caravans (with London Philharmonic Orchestra) – for the same-titled film
- 1985: Dragon Dance (Theme of The Dragon)
- 1990: The Dreamstone (with Friends and London Philharmonic Orchestra) – for the same-titled animated series
- 1997: Keep the Aspidistra Flying (with London Philharmonic Orchestra) – for the same-titled film
  - Known as A Merry War (in USA and New Zealand)
- 2000: Watership Down (with Friends and Royal Philharmonic Orchestra) – for the same-titled animated series

Symphonies

- 2026: Symphony No. 1 "Ukraine" (with London Symphony Orchestra)

=== Productions ===
- 1975: All Around My Hat – Steeleye Span
- 1976: "Little Does She Know" – Kursaal Flyers
- 1976: Rocket Cottage – Steeleye Span
- 1979: Hacienda View – Linda Lewis
- 1980: "Soldier's Song" – The Hollies
- 1981: Rapid Eye Movements – Autopilot
- 1982: "A Winter's Tale" – David Essex
- 1983 "Please Don't Fall in Love" – Cliff Richard
- 1984: "I Feel Like Buddy Holly" – Alvin Stardust
- 1989: Classic Blue – Justin Hayward / London Philharmonic Orchestra
- 1995: The Violin Player – Vanessa Mae
- 1998: Philharmania – Royal Philharmonic Orchestra / Mike Batt
- 2000: The Wombles Collection (34 track Double CD)
- 2002: The Classical Graffiti – The Planets
- 2003: Call Off the Search – Katie Melua
- 2005: After a Dream – Robert Meadmore
- 2005: Piece by Piece – Katie Melua
- 2007: Pictures – Katie Melua
- 2008: The Katie Melua Collection – Katie Melua
- 2012: Secret Symphony – Katie Melua
- 2013: Ketevan – Katie Melua (with Luke Batt)

== Books ==
In 2019, Batt's fantasy-adventure novel The Chronicles Of Don't Be So Ridiculous Valley was published by London Street Books.

Mike Batt published his autobiography, The Closest Thing to Crazy: My Life of Musical Adventures, in 2024.
