= Gorillaz Live =

2001–02 concert tour by Gorillaz

- Tour by Gorillaz
- Location: Asia; Europe; North America
- Associated album: Gorillaz
- Start date: 22 March 2001
- End date: 20 July 2002
- Legs: 5
- No. of shows: 22
- Supporting act: Dan the Automator

Gorillaz concert chronology
- Gorillaz Live (2001–2002); Demon Days Live (2005–2006)

Gorillaz Live was the first concert tour by the British alternative rock virtual band Gorillaz, in support of their self-titled debut album.

== Visuals and production ==
The logistics of an animated band going on tour proved problematic, with Jamie Hewlett saying in a mid-2001 interview: "We've come to realize that we've come up with something that's a bit ahead of its time and the technology doesn't exist to do everything we want to do, so the live show was something we had to really think hard about." As a compromise between having a live and virtual stage presence, the band's musicians played behind a giant cinema screen, which projected music videos and visuals to the crowd. Lead singer Damon Albarn later expressed discomfort at this setup, confessing that he "was frustrated" behind the screen. Later still, Albarn called the screens "obtuse", believing the human element of the band necessitated a change. In a 2010 interview, Albarn voiced distaste at the concept of hiding collaborators behind a screen on the then-upcoming Escape to Plastic Beach Tour: "I couldn't entertain the idea of putting Lou Reed or Bobby Womack behind a screen. I'm not that daft." Gorillaz Live was ultimately the only tour to have the musicians silhouetted behind a screen.

The voice actors of the virtual band toured alongside the real band, speaking to the crowd and each other in-between songs. However, according to Haruka Kuroda, budgeting issues prevented most of the voice actors from participating in the concert's international legs; Kuroda was the only voice actor to tour with the band beyond Europe. American DJ Dan the Automator was the opening act for select dates.

== Set list ==
The following set list is obtained from the concert held in London on 22 March 2001.

1. "M1 A1"
2. "Tomorrow Comes Today"
3. "Slow Country"
4. "5/4"
5. "Starshine"
6. "Man Research (Clapper)"
7. "Sound Check (Gravity)"
8. "Latin Simone (¿Qué Pasa Contigo?)"
9. "Re-Hash"
10. "Clint Eastwood" (featuring Phi Life Cypher)
11. "Rock the House" (featuring Phi Life Cypher)
12. "Dracula"
13. "19-2000"
14. "Punk"

Encore

15. "Clint Eastwood" (featuring Sweetie Irie)

== Tour dates ==
List of 2001 concerts
Date	City	Country	Venue
22 March	London	England	Scala
22 June	Paris	France	La Cigale
24 June	Dublin	Ireland	Olympia Theatre
16 August	Osaka	Japan	IMP Hall
18 August (Note: The show on 18 August 2001 in Tokyo was part of the Summer Sonic Festival.)	Tokyo	Japan	Chiba Marine Stadium
25 August (Note: The show on 25 August 2001 in Liverpool was part of the Creamfields festival.)	Liverpool	England	Old Liverpool Airfield
24 September	Edinburgh	Scotland	Edinburgh Corn Exchange
25 September	Birmingham	England	Birmingham Academy
26 September	Manchester	England	Manchester Academy
28 September	London	England	London Forum

List of 2002 concerts
Date	City	Country	Venue
23 February	Toronto	Canada	Toronto Docks
25 February	Boston	United States	Avalon Ballroom
26 February	Washington, D.C.	United States	9:30 Club
28 February	New York City	United States	Hammerstein Ballroom
1 March	Philadelphia	United States	Electric Factory
3 March	Chicago	United States	Aragon Ballroom
5 March	Seattle	United States	Paramount Theatre
7 March	San Francisco	United States	Warfield Theatre
8 March	Los Angeles	United States	Hollywood Palladium
9 March	Los Angeles	United States	Hollywood Palladium
11 March	Mexico City	Mexico	Palacio de los Deportes
20 July (Note: The show on 20 July 2002 in Lisbon was part of the Isle of MTV festival.)	Lisbon	Portugal	Torre de Belém

== Personnel ==
- Damon Albarn – lead vocals, keyboards, rhythm guitar, piano, acoustic guitar, melodica
- Junior Dan – bass guitar
- Roberto Occhipinti – bass guitar (only during North American tour, replacing Junior Dan)
- Simon Katz – lead guitar
- Cass Browne – drums, percussion, drum machine
- Mike Smith – keyboards
- Darren Galea "DJ D-Zire" – turntables
- Phi Life Cypher – vocals on "Clint Eastwood" and "Rock the House" (Non-North American tour dates)
- Jamal Gray – vocals on "Clint Eastwood" and "Rock the House" (only during North American tour)
- D12 – vocals on "911" (New York City only)
- Sweetie Irie – vocals on "Clint Eastwood (Ed Case Refix)"
- Haruka Kuroda – backing vocals, speaking voice of Noodle (miming playing the second guitar to look like Noodle with the helmet; intermissions)
- Remi Kabaka Jr. – speaking voice of Russel (intermissions)
- Phil Cornwell – speaking voice of Murdoc (intermissions)
- Nelson De Freitas – speaking voice of 2-D (intermissions)
