= 5/4 (song) =

2001 song by Gorillaz

Song by Gorillaz

from the album Gorillaz
- Released: 26 March 2001
- Genre: Garage rock; pop
- Length: 2:42
- Label: EMI; Parlophone; Virgin
- Songwriter: Damon Albarn
- Producers: Dan the Automator; Gorillaz

Music video
- "5/4 (Animatic)" on YouTube

"5/4" is a song by British virtual band Gorillaz and is the second track on their 2001 self-titled debut album. According to the Gorillaz biography Rise of the Ogre, "5/4" was originally intended to follow "Clint Eastwood" as a single, but was instead replaced by "19-2000" at the "last minute." The storyboards Jamie Hewlett had started for the accompanying music video before the switch were later included on the DVD Phase One: Celebrity Take Down. The title is a reference to the 5/4 time signature of the guitar riff that appears throughout the track. The song was performed live by the band on their first tour, and was subsequently brought back on the Humanz Tour, with Jehnny Beth taking lead vocals.

== Music video ==
Although production for the track's music video was never finished, a storyboard from Gorillaz' 2002 compilation DVD, Phase One: Celebrity Take Down, includes an animatic for the scrapped "5/4" music video. The video opens with a brief image of a woman masturbating that is censored by the Gorillaz logo. Each of her breasts is covered by a blue star. It proceeds with Gorillaz performing for a crowd upon a raised platform (the platform is in the shape of a bone). Murdoc is playing with the band when he sees a group of women on a platform next to theirs; however, the platform is too far away to get to. Murdoc then takes off his clothes until he is in completely nude, then attempts to jump to the platform with the women on it, but he instead fails to reach it and he falls into the crowd below.

== Personnel ==
- Damon Albarn – vocals, guitars, synthesizers, bass guitars
- Miho Hatori – additional vocals
- Kid Koala – turntables
- Dan the Automator – producer
- Gorillaz – producer
- Tom Girling – co-producer, drum programming, Pro Tools, engineering
- Jason Cox – co-producer, drums, drum programming, engineering
- Tim Burrell – engineering
- Toby Whelan – engineering assistance
- Howie Weinberg – mastering
