= Phase One: Celebrity Take Down =

2002 video album by Gorillaz

Video by Gorillaz
- Released: 18 November 2002
- Recorded: 1998–2001
- Length: Void, multiple features
- Label: Parlophone
- Producer: Gorillaz

Gorillaz chronology
Phase One: Celebrity Take Down (2002)	Demon Days Live (2006)

Professional ratings
Review scores
Source	Rating
Pitchfork Media	5.6/10

Phase One: Celebrity Takedown is a compilation DVD by Gorillaz, released in November 2002. The DVD compiles the videos and animatics related to the release of the band's first album, Gorillaz, G-Sides, and Laika Come Home, as well as the related singles. The DVD came with an extra CD-ROM containing desktop wallpapers, screensavers and other such special features. Limited edition copies came packaged in a hard box with a map of Kong Studios, exclusive sticker sheet and a 52-page reprint of the original promotional booklet released in limited quantities three years prior.

== Overview ==
The DVD itself follows a small storyline, with the player being a police investigator sent to examine Kong Studios due to strange goings on. The studios look in a reasonably good state, which would change dramatically for Phase Two. Starting at the lobby, the player can turn on the jukebox and watch all four music videos, or explore the building using the icons at the bottom of the screen. If the player waits in a room for too long, they will get attacked and die, but resurrect back in the lobby. This DVD is mostly traditionally animated, while also maintaining some elements of three-dimensional animation as well.

Noodle's room

- "Tomorrow Comes Today" video
- "Game of Death" G-Bite

Murdoc's Winnebago

- "Clint Eastwood" video, animatic and storyboards
- Image Gallery
- "The Eel" G-Bite

2D's room

- "19/2000" video, animatic and storyboards
- 2D Interview
- "Free Tibet" G-Bite

Russel's room

- "Rock The House" video, animatic and storyboards
- "Jump The Gut" G-Bite

Toilet

- "5/4" unfinished animatic
- "Hey, Our Toys Have Arrived!" G-Bite

Box office

- "Clint Eastwood" Live at the Brits; Multi-angle performance
- "Clint Eastwood" Live at the Golden Music Awards
- "The Charts of Darkness" documentary – 24:55

Backend

- Live show visuals for "M1A1", "Tomorrow Comes Today", "Dracula", "Punk", "5/4" and "Sound Check (Gravity)"
- Website tour
- "Dr. Wurzel's Winnebago"
- "Lil' Dub Chefin" & DVD production credits (Hidden feature; Accessible after visiting all the other rooms at least once)

== Gorilla Bitez ==
- Jump the Gut – Noodle and Del are betting to see if 2-D will jump over Russel's 'gut'. 2-D is on a tricycle, speeding up with his hands firmly on the brakes, while Russel is on the ground asleep, scratching his crotch. 2-D pedals up a wooden ramp, but fails to jump over Russel's stomach and wakes him up, sending Del back into Russel's head and 2-D soaring through the air. Russel stands up with money in his ear (which was Del's betting money) while Noodle is grabbing the money that Del dropped. Angry, Russel picks 2-D up and tells him that "If you keep doing this, man, I'll be jumping you next time you're asleep," and judges that neither of them "are going to make it."
- Hey! Our Toys Have Arrived – The band is sitting before their model toys. 2-D says that they are useless, saying that his head doesn't wobble like the toy. Russel grabs hold of 2-D's neck and shakes it, revealing that it does. Noodle is amazed, while Murdoc encourages him to do it again.
- Game of Death – Russel and Noodle spar in a short sequence serving as an obvious homage to the movie Game of Death, with Noodle wearing Bruce Lee's distinctive yellow jumpsuit. When Noodle quickly wins, it is revealed that 2-D and Murdoc are using them as video game characters, and Murdoc complains that the Russel character "is rubbish" and that his controller is broken. Then Murdoc asks for a rematch, much to Russel's dismay.
- Free Tibet Campaign – In this bit, 2-D is sitting in meditation with other Tibetans outside the Chinese embassy in London, in protest at the treatment of Tibetans. At the end of the bite, a message is shown, which states "Free Tibet Campaign stands for the Tibetans' right to determine their own future. It campaigns for an end to the Chinese occupation of Tibet, and for the Tibetans' fundamental rights to be respected."
- The Eel – On orders from Russel, 2-D tries to prepare an eel for dinner by hitting it with a mallet. The noise awakens Murdoc, who grabs the eel from 2-D and goes to "melt its face". Russel comes in asking for the eel, and Murdoc says that it feels 'eel (ill)'.
- Fancy Dress – The band is taking a Halloween photo. Murdoc focuses the camera on them, and runs back to pose. Russel thinks Murdoc shouldn't go dressing up as a Nazi, because he has an appreciation for clothes. (This is an unfinished cartoon that would eventually appear on Slowboat to Hades)

== Charts ==
Chart (2002)	Peak position
UK Music Videos (OCC)	15
US Music Videos (Billboard)	28

== Certifications ==
Region	Certification	Certified units/sales
France (SNEP)	Gold	10,000^{*}
^{*} Sales figures based on certification alone.

== Release details ==
The DVD was released in various countries in November 2002.

Country	Date	Label	Format	Catalog
United Kingdom	18 November 2002	Parlophone	DVD	490 1310
United States	26 November 2002	Virgin Records	DVD	90132
Japan	26 February 2003	Toshiba-EMI	DVD	
