= G-Sides =

2001 compilation album by Gorillaz

Compilation album by Gorillaz
- Released: 12 December 2001
- Recorded: 1998–2001
- Genres: Trip hop; dub; lo-fi; alternative rock
- Length: 45:48 (Japan / UK); 44:31 (US)
- Languages: English; Japanese
- Label: Parlophone
- Producers: Gorillaz; Dan the Automator

Gorillaz chronology
| Gorillaz (2001) | G-Sides (2001) | Laika Come Home (2002) |

Damon Albarn chronology
| 101 Reykjavík (2001) | G-Sides (2001) | Mali Music (2002) |

G-Sides (sometimes spelt as G Sides) is a B-sides collection by Gorillaz from their first studio album session, Gorillaz and the Tomorrow Comes Today EP. The compilation was originally released only in Japan on 12 December 2001. The US edition, with a slightly different track listing, followed on 26 February 2002. The European version, released on 11 March 2002, features the original Japanese track listing. The Japanese and US editions are different because the songs "Dracula" and "Left Hand Suzuki Method" are included on the standard US edition of Gorillaz as bonus tracks. The Brazilian limited edition release incorporates all of the tracks from both the Japanese and US versions of the album. Most versions have the same cover, featuring Noodle holding a skeleton doll in her hand, named "Bonesy", although some—notably the Japanese version—have her holding a Godzilla figurine instead. On the top of the sleeve, the title is written in katakana: ジー サイズ (Jī Saizu). G-Sides reached number 65 on the UK Albums Chart and number 84 on the US Billboard 200.

"The Sounder" first appeared on the French limited edition bonus disc of Gorillaz and is 6:16 in length. On this album and the "Rock the House" single, it is edited to 4:29.

== Critical reception ==
Professional ratings
Aggregate scores
| Source | Rating |
|---|---|
| Metacritic | 65/100 |
Review scores
| Source | Rating |
| AllMusic | 3/5 stars |
| Blender | 2/5 stars |
| Encyclopedia of Popular Music | 3/5 stars |
| Hot Press | 6/12 |
| NME | 7/10 stars |
| PopMatters | 7/10 stars |
| Q | 3/5 stars |
| The Rolling Stone Album Guide | 3.5/5 stars |
| Uncut | 2.5/5 stars |

According to the review aggregator Metacritic, G-Sides received "generally favorable reviews" based on a weighted average score of 65 out of 100 from 11 critic scores.

== Track listings ==
All songs are written by Gorillaz.

G-Sides – Japanese / UK edition
| No. | Title | Length |
|---|---|---|
| 1. | "19-2000" (Soulchild remix) | 3:29 |
| 2. | "Dracula" | 4:41 |
| 3. | "Rock the House" (radio edit) (featuring Del the Funky Homosapien) | 3:03 |
| 4. | "The Sounder" (edit) (featuring Phi Life Cypher) | 4:29 |
| 5. | "Faust" | 3:51 |
| 6. | "Clint Eastwood" (Phi Life Cypher version) | 4:52 |
| 7. | "Ghost Train" | 3:54 |
| 8. | "Hip Albatross" | 2:42 |
| 9. | "Left Hand Suzuki Method" | 3:12 |
| 10. | "12D3" | 3:24 |
| 11. | "Clint Eastwood" (music video) | 4:28 |
| 12. | "Rock the House" (music video) | 3:43 |
| Total length: | | 45:48 |

G-Sides – US edition
| No. | Title | Length |
|---|---|---|
| 1. | "19-2000" (Soulchild remix) | 3:29 |
| 2. | "Latin Simone" | 3:38 |
| 3. | "19-2000" (The Wiseguys House of Wisdom remix) | 7:15 |
| 4. | "The Sounder" (edit) (featuring Phi Life Cypher) | 4:29 |
| 5. | "Faust" | 3:51 |
| 6. | "Clint Eastwood" (Phi Life Cypher version) | 4:52 |
| 7. | "Ghost Train" | 3:54 |
| 8. | "Hip Albatross" | 2:42 |
| 9. | "12D3" | 3:24 |
| 10. | "Tomorrow Comes Today" (music video) | 3:14 |
| 11. | "Rock the House" (music video) | 3:43 |
| Total length: | | 44:31 |

G-Sides – Brazilian limited edition
| No. | Title | Length |
|---|---|---|
| 1. | "19-2000" (Soulchild remix) | 3:29 |
| 2. | "Latin Simone" | 3:38 |
| 3. | "19-2000" (The Wiseguys House of Wisdom remix) | 7:15 |
| 4. | "The Sounder" (edit) (featuring Phi Life Cypher) | 4:29 |
| 5. | "Faust" | 3:51 |
| 6. | "Clint Eastwood" (Phi Life Cypher version) | 4:52 |
| 7. | "Ghost Train" | 3:54 |
| 8. | "Hip Albatross" | 2:42 |
| 9. | "12D3" | 3:24 |
| 10. | "Dracula" | 4:41 |
| 11. | "Rock the House" (radio edit) (featuring Del the Funky Homosapien) | 3:03 |
| 12. | "Left Hand Suzuki Method" | 3:12 |
| 13. | "Clint Eastwood" (music video) | 4:28 |
| 14. | "Rock the House" (music video) | 3:43 |
| 15. | "19-2000" (music video) | 4:00 |
| 16. | "Noodle Fight" (video game) | – – |

=== Song origins ===
- "19-2000" (Soulchild remix), "19-2000" (The Wiseguys House of Wisdom remix), "Hip Albatross", and "Left Hand Suzuki Method" are b-sides of "19-2000".
- "Dracula" and "Clint Eastwood" (Phi Life Cypher Version) are b-sides of "Clint Eastwood".
- "Rock the House" (radio edit), "The Sounder", "Faust", and "Ghost Train" are b-sides of "Rock the House".
- "Latin Simone" and "12D3" are b-sides of the Tomorrow Comes Today 2000 EP.
- "Ghost Train" was the first ever Gorillaz song, created in 1998.

== Charts ==
=== Weekly charts ===
| Chart (2002–2020) | Peak position |
|---|---|
| Austrian Albums (Ö3 Austria) | 24 |
| Hungarian Albums (MAHASZ) | 26 |
| New Zealand Albums (RMNZ) | 28 |
| Swiss Albums (Schweizer Hitparade) | 95 |
| UK Albums (Official Charts) | 65 |
| US Billboard 200 | 84 |
| US Top Alternative Albums (Billboard) | 11 |
| US Top Rock Albums (Billboard) | 13 |

=== Year-end charts ===
| Chart (2002) | Position |
|---|---|
| Canadian Alternative Albums (Nielsen SoundScan) | 190 |
| French Albums (SNEP) | 141 |

== Certifications ==
| Region | Certification | Certified units/sales |
|---|---|---|
| United Kingdom (BPI) | Silver | 60,000^{‡} |
^{‡} Sales+streaming figures based on certification alone.
