= 911 (Gorillaz and D12 song) =

Single by Gorillaz and D12 featuring Terry Hall

from the album Bad Company: Music from the Motion Picture
- Released: 7 December 2001
- Recorded: 12 September 2001
- Studio: Studio 13, London, UK
- Genre: Rap rock
- Length: 5:48; 5:00 (edit)
- Label: EMI; Parlophone; Hollywood
- Songwriters: Damon Albarn; Jamie Hewlett; Terry Hall; Denaun Porter; Von Carlisle; Ondre Moore; Rufus Johnson; DeShaun Holton
- Producers: Gorillaz; D12; Tom Girling; Jason Cox

Gorillaz singles chronology
"Rock the House" (2001)	"911" (2001)	"Tomorrow Comes Today" (2002)

D12 singles chronology
"Fight Music" (2001)	"911" (2001)	"My Band" (2004)

Terry Hall singles chronology
"I Saw the Light" (1997)	"911" (2001)	"Problem Is" (2003)

Audio
- "911" (reupload) on YouTube

"911" is a song by British virtual band Gorillaz and American hip-hop group D12 and features guest vocals from the Specials member Terry Hall. The song was recorded without Eminem during 2001 in West London, when D12 were left stranded in England after the 9/11 terrorist attacks on New York City. Bizarre renamed the song “London” on one of his compilation albums. The song was featured in the soundtrack of the 2002 action comedy film Bad Company.

== Background ==
The song was recorded without Eminem by Gorillaz and D12 in Damon Albarn's personal studio in West London. The track came about after the 9/11 terrorist attacks in New York City, leaving the band stranded in England; Albarn invited the band to his studio while they were there and played them an early demo of the track. Albarn had always wanted to experiment with Middle-Eastern music, and felt that this song would be perfect. D12 added additional production to the song, before laying down their verses. Terry Hall appears on the song as a vocal harmony with Albarn for the song's chorus. Albarn and Hall had previously spoken about collaborating, however when Hall revealed that he had been taking singing lessons from a Middle-Eastern singer, it inspired Albarn to take the song in a different direction.

An unused freestyle from Proof from the song's recording sessions was used later on the 2026 song "The Manifesto" from the band's ninth studio album The Mountain, which also features Argentine rapper, Trueno.

== Music video ==
The video features the same visuals as "Clint Eastwood" and "19-2000", but with a different background. The track features D12 running towards the camera. Terry Hall does not appear in the music video.

== Live performances ==
Played live only twice, at the New York City Hammerstein Ballroom concert of Gorillaz Live in 2002. The song was also performed with Luton-based rap group Phi Life Cypher, at the Isle of MTV Festival in Lisbon, Portugal.

== Track listing ==
Free download from gorillaz.com

1. "911" – 05:48
- Released on the original Gorillaz Kong Studios website, includes artwork in PDF format.

== Song credits ==
- Gorillaz – vocals
- Proof – vocals
- Kuniva – vocals
- Bizarre – vocals
- Swifty McVay – vocals
- Mr. Porter – vocals
- Terry Hall – vocals
- Tom Girling – engineering, Pro Tools
- Jason Cox – engineering, Pro Tools
