= Gorillaz (album) =

2001 studio album by Gorillaz

Studio album by Gorillaz
- Released: 26 March 2001
- Recorded: 1998–2000
- Studios: Unit 13 at Buspace (Studio 13), London, England: Geejam Studios, Port Antonio, Jamaica
- Genres: Trip hop; alternative rock; dub; lo-fi
- Length: 56:56
- Languages: English; Spanish
- Labels: Parlophone; Virgin; EMI
- Producers: Dan the Automator; Gorillaz; Tom Girling; Jason Cox

Gorillaz chronology
Tomorrow Comes Today (2000)	Gorillaz (2001)	G-Sides (2001)

Damon Albarn chronology
Blur: The Best Of (2000)	Gorillaz (2001)	101 Reykjavík (2001)

Singles from Gorillaz
- 1. "Clint Eastwood" Released: 5 March 2001; 2. "19-2000" Released: 25 June 2001; 3. "Rock the House" Released: 22 October 2001; 4. "Tomorrow Comes Today" Released: 25 February 2002

Gorillaz is the debut album by the English virtual band Gorillaz, released on 26 March 2001 in the United Kingdom by Parlophone and on 19 June 2001 in the United States by Virgin Records. The album was recorded between 1998 and 2000 at Damon Albarn's Studio 13 in London, as well as at Geejam Studios in Jamaica, and was produced by Dan the Automator, alongside the band themselves, Tom Girling, and Jason Cox. The album features guest contributions from Del the Funky Homosapien, Miho Hatori, Ibrahim Ferrer, and Tina Weymouth and Chris Frantz of Tom Tom Club, establishing the pattern of Gorillaz music involving a variety of featured guest collaborators.

Marking a departure from the distinct Britpop sound of Albarn's band Blur, Gorillaz incorporates an eclectic mix of stylistic influences, including trip hop, dub, Latin and punk rock. The album was preceded by the Tomorrow Comes Today EP (2000), which featured three songs that would later appear on the album. The album spawned four singles, including "Clint Eastwood" (featuring Del the Funky Homosapien), "19-2000" (featuring Miho Hatori and Tina Weymouth), "Rock the House" (featuring Del the Funky Homosapien) and "Tomorrow Comes Today". The release of the album was promoted across a variety of multimedia including interactive websites, animated music videos and short cartoons created by Gorillaz co-creator Jamie Hewlett, with the album's associated visual media later compiled and released as the video album Phase One: Celebrity Take Down (2002).

Fueled by the success of the "Clint Eastwood" single, Gorillaz was a major commercial success upon its release, going on to sell over seven million copies worldwide and being certified platinum in the US and triple platinum in the UK. The album's success earned the group an entry in the Guinness Book of World Records as the "Most Successful Virtual Band." The album was promoted via a 2001–2002 world tour, in which Albarn and a backing band performed obscured behind projection screens upon which Hewlett's visuals were displayed. The album received generally positive reviews from critics and has been ranked as among the best albums of the 2000s. B-sides and outtakes from the album's sessions were later released as the compilation album G-Sides, in December 2001. A 20th anniversary reissue of Gorillaz was released in 2021.

== Background ==
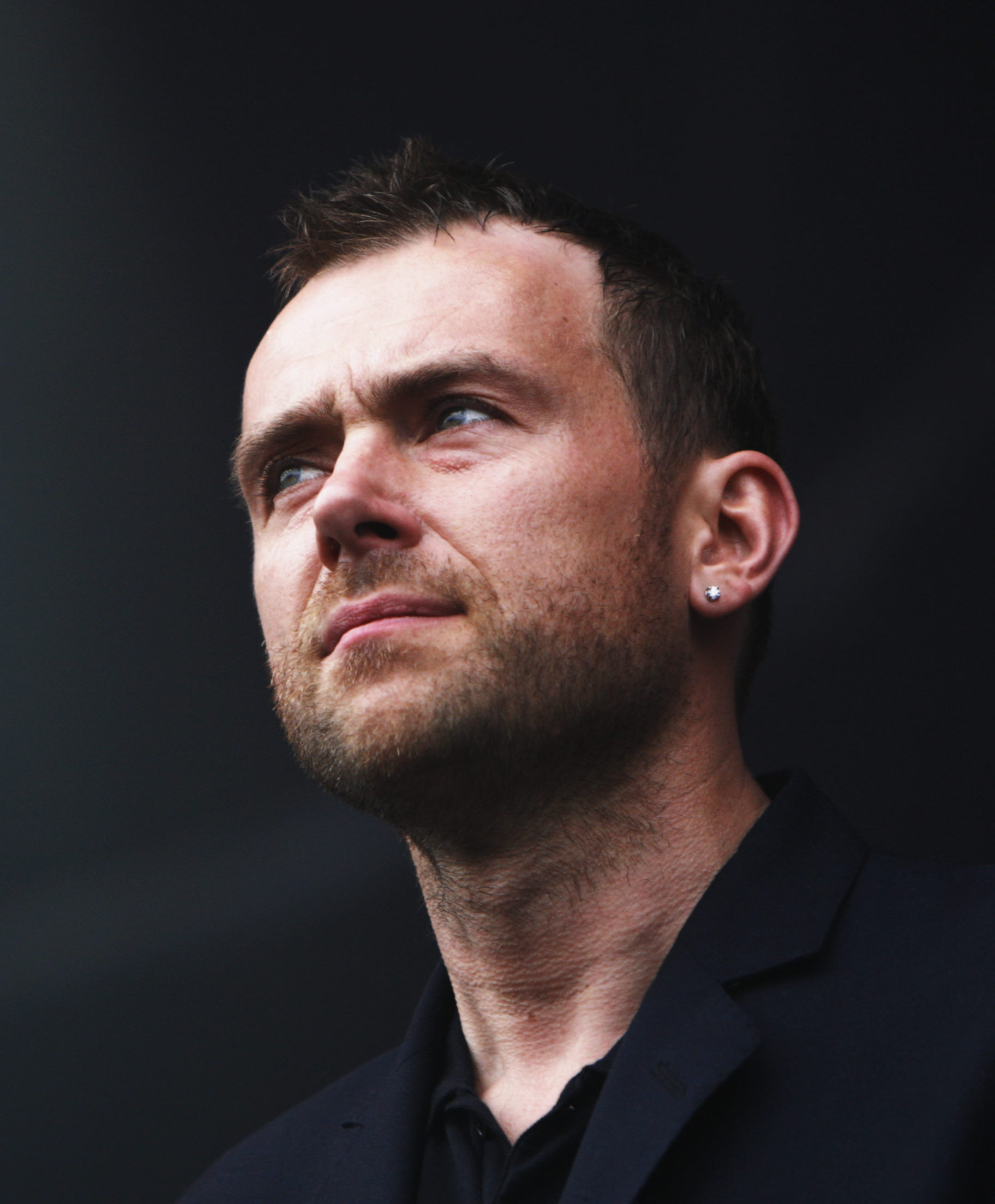
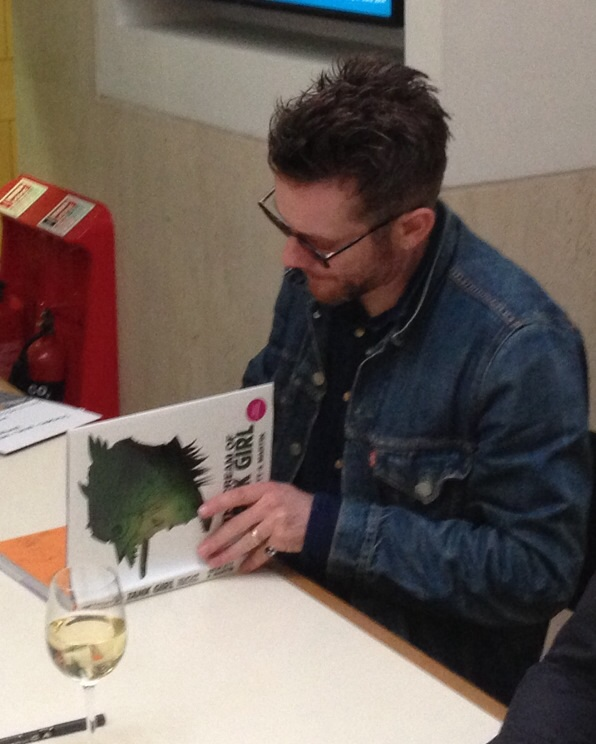
Musician Damon Albarn and artist Jamie Hewlett, the co-creators of Gorillaz

Musician Damon Albarn and comic book creator Jamie Hewlett met in 1990 when guitarist Graham Coxon, a fan of Hewlett's work, asked him to interview Blur, a band Albarn and Coxon had recently formed. The interview was published in Deadline magazine, home of Hewlett's comic strip, Tank Girl. Hewlett initially thought Albarn was "arsey, a wanker"; despite becoming acquaintances with the band, they often did not get on, especially after Hewlett began seeing Coxon's ex-girlfriend Jane Olliver. Despite this, Albarn and Hewlett started sharing a flat on Westbourne Grove in London in 1997. Hewlett had recently broken up with Olliver and Albarn was at the end of his highly publicised relationship with Justine Frischmann of Elastica.

The idea to create Gorillaz came about when Albarn and Hewlett were watching MTV. Hewlett said, "If you watch MTV for too long, it's a bit like hell – there's nothing of substance there. So we got this idea for a cartoon band, something that would be a comment on that." The band originally identified themselves as "Gorilla" and the first song they recorded was "Ghost Train" which was later released as a B-side on their single "Rock the House" and the B-side compilation G-Sides. The musicians behind Gorillaz' first incarnation included Albarn, Del the Funky Homosapien, Dan the Automator and Kid Koala, who had previously worked together on the track "Time Keeps on Slipping" for Deltron 3030's first album Deltron 3030.

Although not released under the Gorillaz name, Albarn has said that "one of the first ever Gorillaz tunes" was Blur's 1997 single "On Your Own", which was released for their fifth studio album Blur (1997).

=== 20th anniversary reissue ===
In March 2021, to celebrate the 20th anniversary of the album's release, a vinyl box set was announced. The first edition of the boxset, which was exclusive to the band's webstore, was released on 10 December 2021. The boxset includes previously released material, including the original album, the B-sides compilation album G-Sides, and the remix album Laika Come Home (which received its first reissue since its initial press) and previously unreleased material, including live performances from the 2001 London Forum concert and five demos. Additionally, it also includes notes and early sketches by Jamie Hewlett during the making of the album.

== Composition ==
Critics have described the album as alternative rock, lo-fi, dub, hip-hop, trip hop, and art pop, with elements of punk rock, rap rock, art rock, Britpop, Latin, and bubblegum pop. The album's first single "Clint Eastwood", is named after the famous movie actor. An interpolation of the "Rock 1" preset from the Omnichord OM-300 can be heard throughout the song. Years after the release of this album, it was revealed that the track "Starshine" has an alternative version, which features Luton-based rap group Phi Life Cypher. This version is not available on any releases, but it is available on the Phi Life Cypher SoundCloud channel and also on the video-sharing website YouTube.

All editions of the Gorillaz album feature an enhanced section that included screen savers, wallpaper and an autoplay, featuring a short movie which opens the user's web browser to a special section of the Gorillaz website, which gives the user full access to Murdoc's Winnebago. This website does not work anymore, and automatically redirects you to the Gorillaz website.

Del the Funky Homosapien collaborated on two songs on the album, "Clint Eastwood" and "Rock the House", both of which became singles and videos and achieved chart success. Del was not originally slated to collaborate on these songs. By the time Del came onto the project, the album was already finished, and Phi Life Cypher had recorded verses for "Clint Eastwood"; but when Del finished making Deltron 3030 with Dan the Automator, Automator asked if he could stay in the studio a little longer to record new verses for the Gorillaz songs. For the purposes of the music videos and the Gorillaz storyline canon, Del performed as Gorillaz character "Del the Ghost Rapper", who was said to be a spirit that was hiding from death within the band's drummer, Russel Hobbs. Del later commented in an interview on the success of "Clint Eastwood" by saying that he actually wrote his rap for the song using the book How to Write a Hit Song, a book that he bought with a coupon his mother gave him. After the song went platinum he gave the plaque to his mother. As part of Russel Hobbs' backstory, the character of Del was one of Russel's friends that was gunned down in a drive-by shooting, whose ghost possessed Russel.

In 2004, the album was packaged with 2002's Laika Come Home in a limited edition box set as part of EMI's "2CD Originals" collection. Other saw a release such as the reggae-dub "Dub Dumb", which features British-Jamaican artist Sweetie Irie; it is available on the PlayStation 2 game MTV Music Generator 2 rather than on G-Sides or the album itself. Other tracks include "Gor Beaten", which was another track that didn't make the album; however, elements of the track's instrumental were once available on one of the Gorillaz member's computers in Kong Studios.

== Critical reception ==
Professional ratings
Aggregate scores
Source	Rating
Metacritic	71/100
Review scores
Source	Rating
AllMusic	4.5/5 stars
Alternative Press	8/10
The Guardian	4/5 stars
Los Angeles Times	3/4 stars
NME	6/10
Pitchfork	7.0/10
Q	4/5 stars
Rolling Stone	3/5 stars
Slant Magazine	4/5 stars
Spin	7/10

According to the review aggregator Metacritic, Gorillaz received "generally favorable reviews" based on a weighted average score of 71 out of 100 from 18 critic scores. It was ranked sixth in both Spin's and Kludge's end-of-year lists, 48 on NME's 2001 year-end list and Q ranked it among the 50 best albums of the year. The album was nominated for the 2001 Mercury Music Prize (Gorillaz was bookmakers' favourite before the nomination was withdrawn at the band's request).

The album made some retrospective "best of" lists. Slant Magazine ranked the album number 96 in its best of the 2000s, Complex, Consequence Of Sound and Rhapsody ranked it among the top 100 albums of the 2000s and Gigwise included it in its 2013 best self-titled albums of all time. The album was given an entry in the book 1001 Albums You Must Hear Before You Die.

== Singles ==
- "Tomorrow Comes Today" was released as an EP before the album was released. A video for the single was also released.
- "Clint Eastwood" was the first single from the album, debuting on 4 March 2001. The single peaked at number 4 on the UK Singles Chart, number 57 on the Billboard Hot 100 and number 3 on the Billboard Hot Modern Rock Tracks chart.
- "19-2000" was the second single from the album, released in June 2001. The single peaked at number 6 on the UK Singles Chart and number 23 on the Billboard Hot Modern Rock Tracks.
- "Rock the House" was the third single from the album, released in October 2001. The single peaked at number 18 on the UK Singles Chart.
- "Tomorrow Comes Today" was the fourth and final single from the album, released almost a year after the album, in February 2002. It peaked at number 33 on the UK Singles Chart.
- "5/4" was repeatedly considered for a single but was edged out by "19-2000" and "Rock the House". A video was considered for this, but never got past the storyboarding stage.

== Track listing ==
All songs are written by Damon Albarn and performed by Gorillaz, except where noted. Produced by Dan the Automator and Gorillaz with the exception of track 13, produced by Tom Girling & Jason Cox.

Gorillaz – Standard version
No.	Title	Writer(s)	Performer(s)	Length
1.	"Re-Hash"			3:40
2.	"5/4"			2:42
3.	"Tomorrow Comes Today"			3:13
4.	"New Genious (Brother)" ( (Note: Changed to "New Genius (Brother)" in current streaming versions))	Damon Albarn; Odetta Gordon		3:59
5.	"Clint Eastwood"	Albarn; Teren Jones	Gorillaz; Del the Funky Homosapien	5:41
6.	"Man Research (Clapper)"			4:30
7.	"Punk"			1:36
8.	"Sound Check (Gravity)"			4:41
9.	"Double Bass"			4:45
10.	"Rock the House"	Albarn; Jones; Dan Nakamura; John Dankworth	Gorillaz; Del	4:08
11.	"19-2000"			3:27
12.	"Latin Simone (¿Qué Pasa Contigo?)"	Albarn; Ibrahim Ferrer; Lázaro Villa	Ibrahim Ferrer; Gorillaz	3:36
13.	"Starshine"			3:31
14.	"Slow Country"			3:34
15.	"M1 A1" ( (Note: Vinyl and Europe first edition CD includes hidden track "Clint Eastwood (Ed Case and Sweetie Irie refix)"))	Albarn; John Harrison		3:50
Total length:				56:56

Gorillaz – International hidden track and LP bonus track
No.	Title	Length
16.	"Clint Eastwood (Ed Case Refix)"	4:30

Gorillaz – Reissue bonus tracks
No.	Title	Length
16.	"Clint Eastwood (Ed Case Refix Edit)"	3:43
17.	"19-2000 (Soulchild Remix)"	3:29

Gorillaz – US bonus tracks
No.	Title	Length
16.	"Dracula"	4:42
17.	"Left Hand Suzuki Method"	3:12
18.	"Clint Eastwood (Ed Case Refix Edit)" ( (Note: Hidden track))	3:43

Gorillaz – US Reissue bonus tracks
No.	Title	Length
16.	"Dracula"	4:42
17.	"Left Hand Suzuki Method"	3:12
18.	"19-2000 (Soulchild Remix)"	3:29
19.	"Clint Eastwood (Ed Case Refix)"	4:28

=== Sample credits ===
- "New Genious (Brother)" contains samples of "Hit or Miss", written by Odetta Gordon and performed by Bo Diddley.
- "Man Research (Clapper)" contains samples of "In the Hall of the Mountain Queen" written and performed by Raymond Scott.
- "Rock the House" contains samples of "Modesty Blaise", written and performed by John Dankworth.
- "Slow Country" contains samples of "Ghost Town" written by Jerry Dammers and performed by The Specials.
- "M1 A1" contains samples of music from the film Day of the Dead, written by John Harrison.

=== 20th Anniversary super deluxe vinyl boxset ===
==== LP 3: G-Sides ====
No.	Title	Length
1.	"19-2000" (Soulchild Remix)	3:29
2.	"Dracula"	4:41
3.	"Rock the House" (radio edit) (featuring Del the Funky Homosapien)	3:03
4.	"The Sounder" (featuring Phi Life Cypher)	4:29
5.	"Faust"	3:51
6.	"Clint Eastwood" (Phi Life Cypher Version)	4:52
7.	"Ghost Train"	3:54
8.	"Hip Albatross"	2:42
9.	"Left Hand Suzuki Method (featuring Miho Hatori)"	3:12
10.	"12D3"	3:24
11.	"Space Monkeyz Theme (featuring Space Monkeyz)"	5:19
Total length:		45:48

==== LP 4 and 5: Laika Come Home (Spacemonkeyz vs Gorillaz) ====
No.	Title	Length
1.	"Jungle Fresh"	5:28
2.	"Strictly Rubbadub"	3:41
3.	"Bañana Baby"	5:29
4.	"Monkey Racket"	5:57
5.	"De-Punked"	5:20
6.	"P.45"	4:26
7.	"Dub Ø9"	5:17
8.	"Crooked Dub"	5:31
9.	"Mutant Genius"	5:02
10.	"Come Again"	6:04
11.	"A Fistful of Peanuts"	5:53
12.	"Lil' Dub Chefin'"	4:28
Total length:		62:36

==== LP 6 and 7: Live At The Forum, 2001 ====
No.	Title	Length
1.	"M1 A1"	4:08
2.	"Tomorrow Comes Today"	3:52
3.	"Slow Country"	3:58
4.	"5/4"	3:02
5.	"Starshine"	5:25
6.	"Man Research (Clapper)"	4:58
7.	"Sound Check (Gravity)"	5:13
8.	"Re-Hash"	4:14
9.	"Clint Eastwood"	5:00
10.	"Rock The House"	4:23
11.	"Dracula"	5:14
12.	"19/2000"	3:57
13.	"Punk"	4:36
14.	"5/4" (Reprise)	3:21
15.	"Clint Eastwood" (Reprise)	5:58
Total length:		67:35

==== LP 8: Demoz ====
No.	Title	Length
1.	"1st Idea"	2:41
2.	"Shaga Laga" (demo version of "Controllah")	3:05
3.	"Genious" (demo version of "New Genious (Brother)")	3:57
4.	"Hand Clapper" (demo version of "Man Research (Clapper)")	3:05
5.	"Acoustic 2" (demo version of "Latin Simone")	2:06
Total length:		14:54

== Personnel ==
Credits adapted from the liner notes of Gorillaz.

=== Musicians ===
- Damon Albarn – vocals, keyboards, piano, melodica, guitars, bass guitar (tracks 2–3, 7, 9), drum programming, flute (track 10)
- Junior Dan – bass guitar (tracks 4, 6, 8–15, "Dracula", "Left Hand Suzuki Method")
- Jason Cox – drums, drum programming
- Dan the Automator – sampled loops, drum programming (tracks 2, 8, 12–13), additional synthesizers
- Tom Girling – drum programming
- Kid Koala – turntables
- Miho Hatori – additional vocals (tracks 1–4, 6, 11–12, "Left Hand Suzuki Method")
- Del the Funky Homosapien – vocals (tracks 5, 10)
- Dave Rowntree – drums (tracks 7, 15) (Note: Dave Rowntree goes uncredited in the album's liner notes, but is seen playing drums for the album in the Gorillaz documentary film Bananaz)
- Tina Weymouth – additional vocals, additional percussion (track 11)
- Chris Frantz – additional percussion (track 11)
- Ibrahim Ferrer – vocals (track 12)
- Mike Smith – trumpet (track 12), saxophone ("Dracula")

=== Technical ===
- Dan Nakamura – production (tracks 1–12, 14–15)
- Gorillaz – production (tracks 1–12, 14–15)
- Tom Girling – production (track 13), co-production, engineering, Pro Tools
- Jason Cox – production (track 13), co-production, engineering
- Toby Whelan – engineering assistance
- Howie Weinberg – mastering

=== Artwork ===
- Jamie Hewlett – artwork
- Zombie Flesh Eaters – artwork
- Jow – photography
- Ed Reeve – photography

== Charts ==
=== Weekly charts ===
Chart (2001)	Peak position
Argentinian Albums (CAPIF)	9
Australian Albums (ARIA)	17
Australian Alternative Albums (ARIA)	1
Austrian Albums (Ö3 Austria)	4
Belgian Albums (Ultratop Flanders)	10
Belgian Albums (Ultratop Wallonia)	3
Canadian Albums (Billboard)	13
Chilean Albums Chart	1
Danish Albums (Hitlisten)	4
Dutch Albums (Album Top 100)	15
European Albums (Music & Media)	1
Finnish Albums (Suomen virallinen lista)	7
French Albums (SNEP)	7
German Albums (Offizielle Top 100)	3
Greek Albums (IFPI)	6
Hungarian Albums (MAHASZ)	6
Irish Albums (IRMA)	6
Italian Albums (FIMI)	10
Japanese Albums (Oricon)	49
New Zealand Albums (RMNZ)	2
Norwegian Albums (VG-lista)	2
Polish Albums (ZPAV)	21
Scottish Albums (Official Charts)	4
Slovak Albums (IFPI)	18
Spanish Albums (PROMUSICAE)	10
Swedish Albums (Sverigetopplistan)	14
Swiss Albums (Schweizer Hitparade)	6
Uruguayan Albums (CUD)	1
UK Albums (Official Charts)	3
US Billboard 200	14

Chart (2005)	Peak position
US Top Catalog Albums (Billboard)	31

Chart (2017)	Peak position
US Top Alternative Albums (Billboard)	19
US Top Rock Albums (Billboard)	30

Chart (2021)	Peak position
Portuguese Albums (AFP)	25

=== Year-end charts ===
Chart (2001)	Position
Australian Albums (ARIA)	43
Austrian Albums (Ö3 Austria)	10
Belgian Albums (Ultratop Flanders)	45
Belgian Albums (Ultratop Wallonia)	27
Belgian Alternative Albums (Ultratop Flanders)	22
Canadian Albums (Nielsen SoundScan)	84
Danish Albums (Hitlisten)	42
Dutch Albums (Album Top 100)	68
European Albums (Music & Media)	15
French Albums (SNEP)	25
German Albums (Offizielle Top 100)	22
Italian Albums (FIMI)	43
New Zealand Albums (RMNZ)	10
Swedish Albums (Sverigetopplistan)	54
Swedish Albums & Compilations (Sverigetopplistan)	73
Swiss Albums (Schweizer Hitparade)	33
UK Albums (OCC)	22
US Billboard 200	93
Worldwide Albums (IFPI)	18

Chart (2002)	Position
UK Albums (OCC)	158

Chart (2005)	Position
UK Albums (OCC)	185

Chart (2006)	Position
UK Albums (OCC)	202

== Certifications and sales ==
Region	Certification	Certified units/sales
Argentina (CAPIF)	Platinum	40,000^{^}
Australia (ARIA)	Platinum	70,000^{^}
Austria (IFPI Austria)	Gold	20,000^{*}
Belgium (BRMA)	Platinum	50,000^{*}
Canada (Music Canada)	Platinum	100,000^{^}
Denmark (IFPI Danmark)	Platinum	50,000^{^}
Finland (Musiikkituottajat)	Gold	15,169
France (SNEP)	Platinum	300,000^{*}
Germany (BVMI)	Gold	150,000^{^}
Iceland	—	3,000
Mexico (AMPROFON)	Gold	75,000^{^}
New Zealand (RMNZ)	2× Platinum	30,000^{^}
Norway (IFPI Norway)	Gold	25,000^{*}
Spain (Promusicae)	Gold	50,000^{^}
Sweden (GLF)	Platinum	80,000^{^}
Switzerland (IFPI Switzerland)	Platinum	40,000^{^}
United Kingdom (BPI)	3× Platinum	974,311
United States (RIAA)	Platinum	1,900,000
Uruguay (CUD)	Gold	3,000^{^}
Summaries
Europe (IFPI)	2× Platinum	2,000,000^{*}
Worldwide	—	7,000,000
^{*} Sales figures based on certification alone.^{^} Shipments figures based on certification alone.

== Release history ==
Region	Label	Catalog	Edition
United Kingdom	Parlophone	7243 5 32093 0	original
United Kingdom	Parlophone	7243 5 31138 0 3	reissue
France	Parlophone	7243 5 34488 0 6	limited
United States	Virgin	7243 5 33748 0 8	original
United States	Virgin	7243 5 33748 0 8	reissue
Malaysia	EMI	7243 5 38704 0 9	limited
USA	Warner Bros. Records	337480-2PRL	December 2013, reissued after Universal acquired EMI and Warner's acquisition of Parlophone.
