= 5/4 =

5/4 may refer to:

- May 4 (month-day date notation)
- 5 April (day-month date notation)
- 5/4, a time signature containing five quarter notes per measure, see quintuple meter
- Just major third
- "5/4", a song (with the above time signature) by Sunny Day Real Estate from their 1995 album Sunny Day Real Estate
- "5/4" (song), a song by Gorillaz from their 2001 album Gorillaz
- "5/4", an instrumental song by Rammstein from their 2002 single Mutter
- Five-quarter, or 1 1/4″, a common lumber dimension
- Sheet film of dimensions 5 inches by 4 inches
