= Bananaz =

2008 documentary film by Ceri Levy

- Directed by: Ceri Levy
- Written by: Ceri Levy; Jamie Hewlett
- Produced by: Ceri Levy; Rachel Connors
- Starring: Damon Albarn; Jamie Hewlett
- Cinematography: Screen International
- Music by: Gorillaz; Spacemonkeyz
- Production company: Head Film; Bananaz Productions; Parlophone
- Distributed by: EMI Music
- Release date: 7 February 2008 (Berlin Film Festival)
- Running time: 92 minutes
- Language: English

Bananaz is a 2008 British documentary film by Ceri Levy about Damon Albarn and Jamie Hewlett's virtual alternative band Gorillaz.

== Information ==
During the years from 2000 to 2006, the director Ceri Levy filmed the creators of the Gorillaz behind the scenes, from the very first drawings and animations, to the music and the musicians, as well as the faces behind the voices of the characters and other content such as interviews with various Gorillaz collaborators and backstage footage of live concert performances. This documentary features 92 minutes of behind the scenes footage of the creators making the visuals and recording the music for the Gorillaz albums Gorillaz and Demon Days that was recording over the course of six years.

== Release ==
- Bananaz premiered on 7 February 2008 at the Berlin Film Festival and to the rest of the world on 9 February 2008. The documentary was shown in the festival until 15 February.
- The documentary had its first North American premiere at the SXSW Film Festival in Austin, Texas showing at 12 and 15 March 2008 at Texas' Paramount Theater.
- The Indie Lisboa Film Festival held in Lisbon, Portugal twice screened the film on 24 April and 2 May 2008.
- The documentary was shown at the Edinburgh Film Festival that takes places in Edinburgh, United Kingdom in late June 2008.

== Home media ==
On 20 April 2009, it was released on PAL/Region 0 DVD format.
