= Tomorrow Comes Today =

2002 single by Gorillaz

EP by Gorillaz
- Released: 27 November 2000
- Recorded: 1998–2000
- Genres: Trip hop; dub; lo-fi; alternative rock
- Labels: Parlophone; EMI
- Producers: Gorillaz; Dan the Automator; Tom Girling; Jason Cox

Gorillaz chronology
Tomorrow Comes Today (2000)	Gorillaz (2001)

Professional ratings
Tomorrow Comes Today EP
Review scores
Source	Rating
Now	3/5 Ns

"Tomorrow Comes Today"

Single by Gorillaz

from the album Gorillaz
- B-side: "Film Music"
- Released: 25 February 2002 (UK); 12 March 2002 (US)
- Recorded: 1998–2000
- Genre: Trip hop; dub; lo-fi
- Length: 3:13
- Label: Parlophone; Virgin; EMI
- Songwriters: Damon Albarn; Jamie Hewlett
- Producers: Gorillaz; Dan the Automator; Tom Girling; Jason Cox

Gorillaz singles chronology
"911" (2001)	"Tomorrow Comes Today" (2002)	"Lil' Dub Chefin'" (2002)

Music video
- "Tomorrow Comes Today" on YouTube

"Tomorrow Comes Today" is a song from British virtual band Gorillaz's self-titled debut album Gorillaz and was their first release when issued as an EP in November 2000. The first three songs from the EP ended up on their debut album, however, "Latin Simone" was heavily edited, and dubbed into Spanish, for the album release. The new version was sung by Ibrahim Ferrer, and renamed "Latin Simone (¿Que Pasa Contigo?)". The original version is sung by 2-D (voiced by Damon Albarn) and appears along with "12D3" on some versions of the later-released compilation album G-Sides. The song itself was also the fourth and final single from that album, released on 25 February 2002. It peaked at number 33 on the UK Singles Chart. A demo version of the song, "I Got Law" was included as a bonus track of the Japanese edition of 13 by Blur, one of Damon Albarn's other musical projects.

== Formats and track listings ==
European and UK CD EP (2000)

1. "Tomorrow Comes Today" – 3:14
2. "Rock the House" – 4:09
3. "Latin Simone" – 3:38
4. "12D3" – 3:24
5. "Tomorrow Comes Today" (video) – 3:23

UK 12-inch vinyl EP (2000)

1. "Tomorrow Comes Today" – 3:14
2. "Rock the House" – 4:09
3. "Latin Simone" – 3:38
4. "12D3" – 3:24

European and UK CD maxi-single (2002)

1. "Tomorrow Comes Today" – 3:14
2. "Film Music" – 3:04
3. "Tomorrow Dub" – 5:30
4. "Tomorrow Comes Today" (video) – 3:23
5. "Jump the Gut Pt. 1" – 0:30
6. "Jump the Gut Pt. 2" – 0:30

UK 12-inch vinyl single (2002)

1. "Tomorrow Comes Today" – 3:14
2. "Film Music" (Mode remix) – 6:15
3. "Tomorrow Dub" – 5:30

European and UK DVD single (2002)

1. "Tomorrow Comes Today" (video) – 3:23
2. "Film Music" – 3:04
3. "Tomorrow Dub" – 5:30
4. "Jump the Gut Pt. 1" – 0:30
5. "Jump the Gut Pt. 2" – 0:30
- "Tomorrow Dub" mixed by Spacemonkeyz; Early version of "Bañana Baby".

== Personnel ==
- Damon Albarn – vocals, keyboards, melodica, bass guitar
- Miho Hatori – additional vocals
- Dan the Automator – sampled loops
- Jason Cox – engineering
- Tom Girling – Pro Tools, engineering
- Howie Weinberg – mastering

== Music video ==
Directed by Jamie Hewlett, the video for the title track consists mainly of static drawings of the band members placed against real photographs and time-lapsed video footage of London streets. Some of the drawings are animated, especially the ones featuring 2-D singing. This is due to the video having an extremely short deadline compared to its follow-up "Clint Eastwood".

The video begins with writing the band's logo on 2-D's left eye and ends with the logo being written in reverse on 2D's left eye. Graffiti artwork by Banksy can be seen halfway through the video. Trellick Tower is also seen, known for being the birthplace of Gorillaz and where creators of the band Hewlett and Damon Albarn met. The video finishes with the four band members, and 2-D's headache pills, flying across the screen during a fast-motion shot of a tunnel.

== Charts ==
=== Weekly charts ===
Chart (2001–2002)	Peak position
Canada (Nielsen SoundScan)	30
UK Singles (Official Charts)	33

Chart (2025)	Peak position
Hungarian Physical Albums (MAHASZ)	7
