= Rise of the Ogre =

2006 fictional autobiography by Cass Browne and Damon Albarn

- Rise of the Ogre (cover)
- Author: Cass Browne & Damon Albarn
- Illustrator: Jamie Hewlett & Zombie Flesh Eaters
- Cover artist: Jamie Hewlett
- Language: English
- Publisher: Michael Joseph Ltd. Riverhead Books
- Publication date: 26 October 2006; 2 November 2006
- Pages: 304
- ISBN: 1-59448-931-9
- OCLC: 75412673

Rise of the Ogre is an autobiography about the virtual band Gorillaz, ostensibly written by the four band-members in collaboration with (actual) Gorillaz musician and official scribe Cass Browne. It was released in the UK on 26 October 2006 by Michael Joseph Ltd. and in the US on 2 November 2006 by Riverhead Books. A paperback edition of the book was released in the US on 6 November 2007.

Rise of the Ogre has also been released as the world's first audiobook singles. The four part audiobook was narrated by Joss Ackland. Initially an iTunes exclusive, one part was released every week for four weeks beginning 4 December 2006. However, the audiobook on iTunes remains incomplete.

== Contents ==
The book details the life-stories of the band-members: Murdoc Niccals, 2-D, Russel Hobbs, and Noodle. It covers the band from 2000 and their first EP, Tomorrow Comes Today through their 2006 tour ending at the Apollo Theater. It contains previously unknown secrets of the band, such as future plans of the movie, new and rare art by Gorillaz co-creator Jamie Hewlett, the "low down" on Kong Studios, their headquarters, and the story of the truth behind the "El Mañana" video. The book blends fact and fiction throughout, interspersing commentary from the band members with actual quotes from their creators, collaborators and critics.

The front cover of the book, when flipped sideways, is a silhouette of Murdoc Niccals' pet raven 'Cortez'.
