= Sweetie Irie =

British reggae singer and DJ

Dean Bent (born January 1971), better known as Sweetie Irie, is a British reggae singer and deejay.

== Early life ==
Sweetie Irie began working on local sound systems as a teenager.

== Career ==
He gained the attention of Angus Gaye of Aswad, who recruited him to MC on the dancehall mix of their 1989 single "On and On". He was then signed by Island Records and in 1991 released his debut album DJ of the Future which went gold.

Sweetie achieved a No. 53 chart placing with Aswad on the song "Smile" and a No. 47 placing with Scritti Politti on "Take Me in Your Arms and Love Me". In 1999, Sweetie joined UK garage outfit Middle Row and in 2001 collaborated with Ed Case on a remix of Gorillaz' hit single "Clint Eastwood", which charted at number four and went platinum in the UK. He followed that with the top 30 single "Who" (also with Ed Case), which led him to signing with Sony BMG.

In 2016, Sweetie teamed up with contemporary artists Kideko and George Kwali featuring Nadia Rose to release the single "Crank It (Woah)" on the Ministry of Sound label which reached No. 31 in the UK.

In 2017, Sweetie performed on a special edition of Top of the Pops and also performed in the BBC proms as the first reggae artist to do so. In 2018, he collaborated with Redlight on the single "Zum Zum".

He has toured for three decades and has performed at festivals including Glastonbury, Wireless, Love Box and Boom Town.

As well as the artists mentioned above, he has collaborated with No Doubt, Ian Brown, Gwen Stefani, Sly and Robbie, Bobby Digital, Maxi Priest, Shy FX, Congo Natty, Roni Size, Redlight, Zinc and Ms Dynamite.

Sweetie teamed up with drum and bass producer Benny Page, mixing Sweetie's reggae dancehall roots and Page's drum and bass, yielding the album Purple.

Sweetie featured on Afrobeats producer Julz colour tape album, Radar.

In 2020, Sweetie teamed up with Blaise and Nono for the Jin Jin label (Good Body), and regularly appeared on Love Island. Since 2020, Sweetie has been touring with Gorillaz performing the "Clint Eastwood" garage remix.
