= Gorillaz =

British virtual band

- Gorillaz in 2020. Jamie Hewlett (far left) and Damon Albarn (far right) with animated members Murdoc Niccals (top left), Russel Hobbs (top right), 2-D (bottom right), and Noodle (bottom left).

Background information
- Origin: London, England
- Genres: Alternative rock; art pop; hip-hop; electronic; trip hop
- Works: Discography
- Years active: 1998–present (Note: Hiatus from 2012 to 2014)
- Labels: Parlophone; Virgin; Warner; Kong
- Spinoffs: Monkey
- Spinoff of: Blur
- Members: Virtual: 2-D; Murdoc Niccals; Russel Hobbs; Noodle; Non-virtual: Damon Albarn; Jamie Hewlett; Remi Kabaka Jr.
- Past members: Virtual: Paula Cracker; Cyborg Noodle; Ace
- Website: gorillaz.com

Gorillaz are an English virtual band formed in 1998 by the musician Damon Albarn and the artist Jamie Hewlett. The band primarily consists of four fictional members: 2-D (vocals, keyboards, melodica; vocals provided by Albarn), Murdoc Niccals (bass guitar), Noodle (guitar, keyboards, backup vocals) and Russel Hobbs (drums). Their universe is presented in media such as music videos, interviews, comic strips and short cartoons. Gorillaz's music has featured collaborations with a wide range of musicians and featured artists, with Albarn as the only permanent musical contributor.

With Gorillaz, Albarn departed from the distinct Britpop sound of his band Blur, exploring a variety of musical styles including hip-hop, electronic and world music. The band's 2001 debut album, Gorillaz, which features trip hop, punk rock, dub and Latin influences, went triple platinum in the UK and double platinum in Europe, with sales driven by the success of the lead single, "Clint Eastwood". Their second studio album, Demon Days (2005), went six times platinum in the UK, double platinum in the US, and spawned the successful lead single "Feel Good Inc.", along with other hit singles such as "Dare", "Dirty Harry" and "El Mañana". The band's third album, Plastic Beach (2010), featured environmentalist themes, synth-pop elements and an expanded roster of featured artists. Their fourth album, The Fall, was recorded on the road (mainly on Damon Albarn's iPad) during the Escape to Plastic Beach Tour and released on 25 December 2010.

In 2015, after over ten years providing the voice of Russel, Remi Kabaka Jr became a permanent percussionist and music producer for the band. Their fifth album, Humanz (2017), was the band's first in seven years and featured a wide array of guest artists, while its follow-up, The Now Now (2018), focused musically on Albarn. In 2020 Gorillaz started the Song Machine project, a music-based web series with episodes that consisted of standalone singles and accompanying music videos featuring different guests, which culminated with their seventh studio album, Song Machine, Season One: Strange Timez (2020). The band's eighth studio album, Cracker Island (2023), met generally positive reviews as a refinement of their usual style. The band's ninth studio album, The Mountain (2026), drew musical and thematic inspiration from India and was critically acclaimed, being regarded by several reviewers as their strongest work in years.

Gorillaz has presented itself live in a variety of different ways throughout its history, such as hiding the touring band from the audience's view in the early years of the project, projecting animated band members on stage via computer graphics and, since 2010, traditional live touring featuring a fully visible live band. They have won a Grammy Award, two MTV Video Music Awards, an NME Award and four MTV Europe Music Awards. They have also been nominated for 11 Brit Awards and won Best British Group at the 2018 Brit Awards.

== History ==
=== Creation and Gorillaz (1998–2002) ===
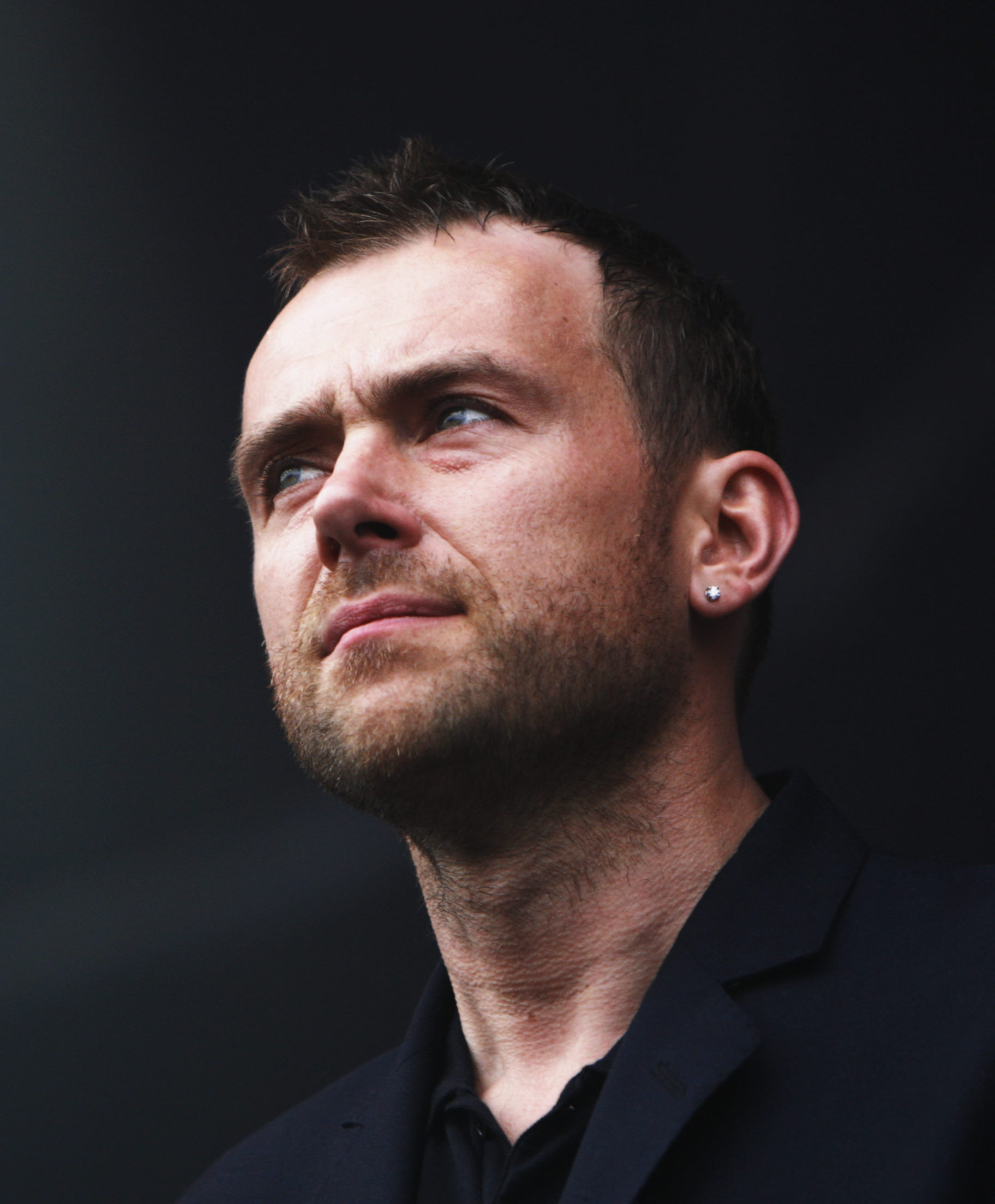
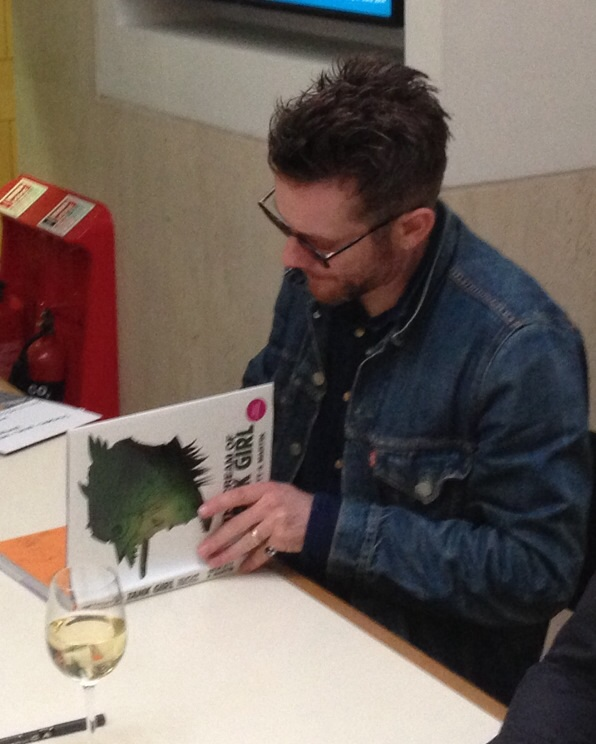
Musician Damon Albarn (left) and artist Jamie Hewlett (right), the co-creators of Gorillaz

Musician Damon Albarn and comic artist Jamie Hewlett met in 1990 when the guitarist Graham Coxon, a fan of Hewlett's work, asked him to interview Blur, which Albarn and Coxon had recently formed. The interview was published in Deadline, home of Hewlett's comic strip Tank Girl. Hewlett initially thought Albarn was "arsey, a wanker". Though Hewlett became acquaintances with the band, he and Albarn often clashed, especially after Hewlett began seeing Coxon's former girlfriend, Jane Oliver. Despite this, Albarn and Hewlett started sharing a flat on Westbourne Grove in London in 1997. Hewlett had recently broken up with Oliver and Albarn was at the end of his highly publicised relationship with Justine Frischmann of Elastica.

The idea to create Gorillaz came about when Albarn and Hewlett were watching MTV. Hewlett said, "If you watch MTV for too long, it's a bit like hell – there's nothing of substance there. So we got this idea for a virtual band, something that would be a comment on that." Albarn said: "This was the beginning of the boy band sort of explosion... and it just felt so manufactured. And we were like, well let's make a manufactured band but make it kind of interesting." The band originally identified themselves as "Gorilla" and the first song they recorded was "Ghost Train", which was later released as a B-side on their single "Rock the House". The band's visual style is thought to have evolved from The 16s, a rejected comic strip Hewlett conceived with the Tank Girl co-creator Alan Martin. Although not released under the Gorillaz name, Albarn has said that "one of the first ever Gorillaz tunes" was Blur's 1997 single "On Your Own", which was released for their fifth studio album Blur.

From 1998 to 2000 Albarn recorded Gorillaz' self-titled debut album at his newly opened Studio 13 in London as well as at Geejam Studios in Jamaica. The sessions resulted in the first Gorillaz release, the EP Tomorrow Comes Today, released on 27 November 2000. This EP consisted mostly of tracks which later appeared on the album, and it also included the band's first music video for "Tomorrow Comes Today", which introduced the virtual band members for the first time. With Gorillaz, Albarn explored genres he had not explored with Blur, such as hip-hop, dub and Latin music, a process he described as liberating: "One of the reasons I began Gorillaz is I had a lot of rhythms I never thought I could use with Blur. A lot of that stuff never really seemed to manifest itself in the music we made together as Blur."

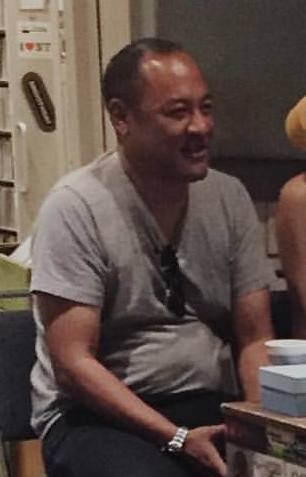
American hip-hop producer Dan "the Automator" Nakamura produced the band's debut album.

Albarn began work on the album by himself, but eventually invited the American hip-hop producer Dan "the Automator" Nakamura. He said: "I called Dan the Automator in after I'd done more than half of it and felt it would benefit from having somebody else's focus. So I just rang him and asked whether he was interested in helping me finish it off." Nakamura and Albarn had recently collaborated on Deltron 3030, the debut album by the hip-hop supergroup of the same name featuring rapper Del the Funky Homosapien and DJ Kid Koala, both of whom Nakamura recruited to assist in finishing Gorillaz material. Del featured on two tracks on the album, including the lead single "Clint Eastwood", while Kid Koala contributed turntables to various tracks. The album featured additional collaborations with Ibrahim Ferrer of Buena Vista Social Club, Miho Hatori of Cibo Matto and Tina Weymouth of Talking Heads and Tom Tom Club, representing a pattern of collaboration with a wide range of artists which later became a staple of Gorillaz.

Gorillaz was released on 26 March 2001 and was a major commercial success, debuting at No. 3 on the UK Albums Chart and No. 14 on the US Billboard 200, going on to sell over 7 million copies worldwide, powered by the success of the "Clint Eastwood" single. The album was promoted with the singles "Clint Eastwood", "19-2000", and "Rock the House", in addition to the previously released "Tomorrow Comes Today", with each single featuring a music video directed by Hewlett starring the virtual members. Hewlett also helmed the design of the band's website, which was presented as an interactive tour of the band's fictional "Kong Studios" home and recording studio, featuring interactive games and explorative elements. Following the release of the album, the band embarked on a brief tour of Europe, Japan and the United States to support the album in which a touring band featuring Albarn played completely obscured behind a giant screen on which Hewlett's accompanying visuals were projected. The virtual band member's voice actors were also present at some shows and spoke live to the audience to give the impression that the fictional band was present on stage. In later interviews, Albarn described the band's first tour as difficult due to the limitations imposed by the band playing behind a screen: "For someone who had just spent the last ten years out front being a frontman [with Blur], it was a really weird experience. And I have to say, some nights I just wanted to get a knife and just cut [the screen] and stick my head through." The album was followed by the B-sides compilation G-Sides released in December 2001.

On 7 December 2001 the band released the single "911", a collaboration with the hip-hop group D12 (without Eminem) and the singer Terry Hall of the Specials about the September 11 attacks. At the 2002 Brit Awards the virtual members of Gorillaz "performed" for the first time, appearing in 3D animation on four large screens along with rap accompaniment by Phi Life Cypher, a production which reportedly cost £300,000 to create. The band were nominated for four Brit Awards, including Best British Group, Best British Album and British Breakthrough Act, but did not win any awards.

On 1 July 2002 a remix album titled Laika Come Home was released, containing most of the tracks from Gorillaz remixed in dub and reggae style by the DJ group Spacemonkeyz. On 18 November 2002 the band released the DVD Phase One: Celebrity Take Down, which contained all of the band's released visual content up to that point along with other extras. After the success of the debut album, Albarn and Hewlett briefly explored the possibility of creating a Gorillaz theatrical film, but Hewlett claimed the duo later lost interest: "We lost all interest in doing it as soon as we started meeting with studios and talking to these Hollywood executive types, we just weren't on the same page. We said, fuck it, we'll sit on the idea until we can do it ourselves, and maybe even raise the money ourselves."

=== Demon Days (2005–2006) ===
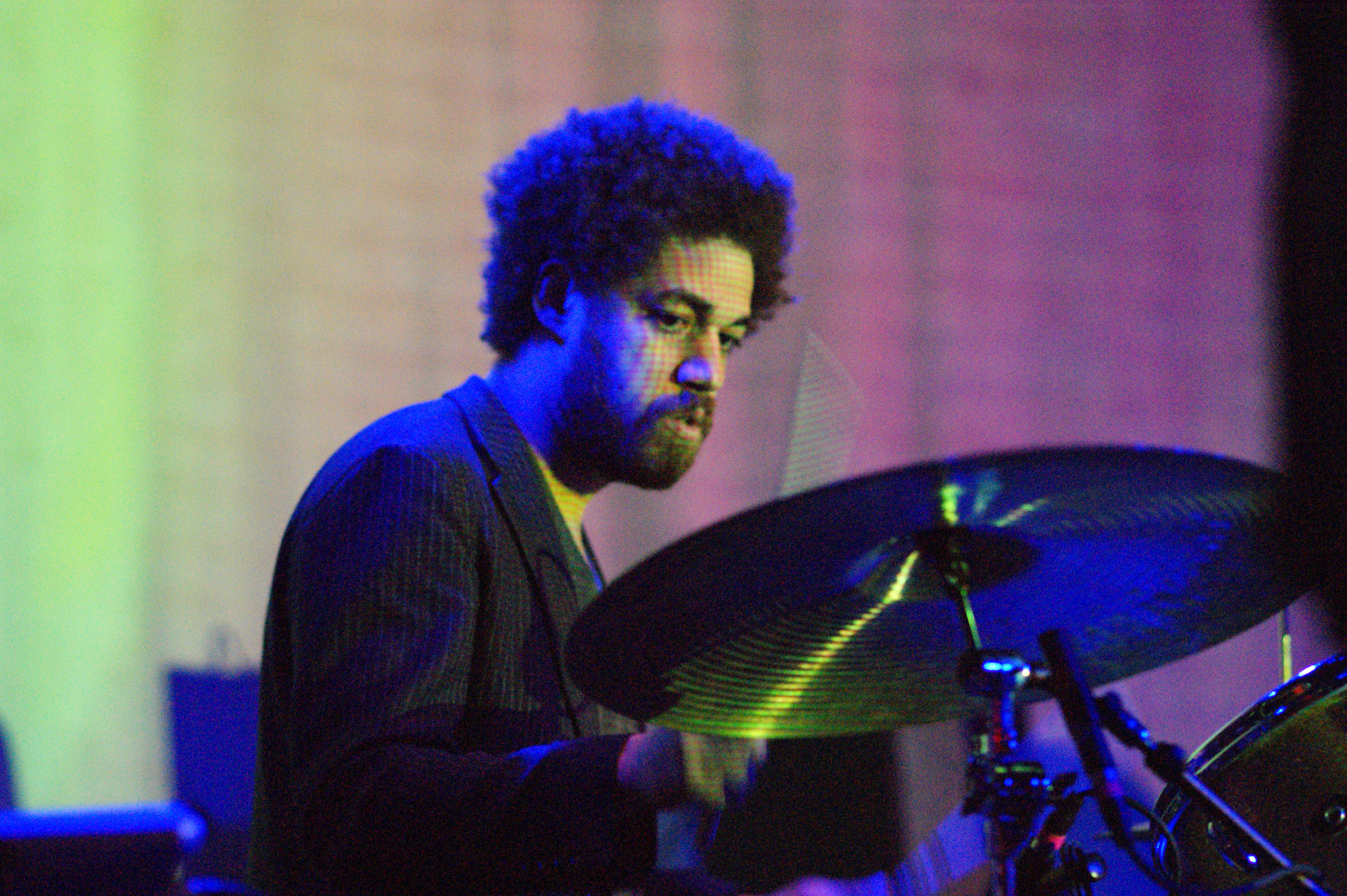
Albarn asked Danger Mouse to produce the band's second album Demon Days after hearing his mashup album The Grey Album.

Albarn spent the majority of 2003 on tour with Blur in support of their newly released album Think Tank; however, upon completion of the tour, he decided to return to Gorillaz, reuniting with Hewlett to prepare for a second album. Hewlett explained that the duo chose to continue Gorillaz to prove that the project was not "a gimmick": "If you do it again, it's no longer a gimmick, and if it works then we've proved a point." The resulting album Demon Days, released on 11 May 2005, was another major commercial success, debuting at No. 1 on the UK Albums Chart and No. 6 on the US Billboard 200, and has since gone six times platinum in the UK, double platinum in the United States, and triple platinum in Australia, outperforming sales of the first album and becoming the band's most successful album to date. The album's success was partially driven by the success of the lead single "Feel Good Inc." featuring the hip-hop group De La Soul, which topped Billboard's Alternative Songs chart in the US for eight consecutive weeks and was featured in a commercial for Apple's iPod. The album was also supported by the later singles "Dare", "Dirty Harry" and the double A-side "Kids with Guns" / "El Mañana".

Demon Days found the band taking a darker tone, partially influenced by a train journey Albarn had taken with his family through impoverished rural China. Albarn described the album as a concept album: "The whole album kind of tells the story of the night — staying up during the night — but it's also an allegory. It's what we're living in basically, the world in a state of night." Believing that the album needed "a slightly different approach" compared to the first album, Albarn enlisted American producer Brian Burton, better known by his stage name Danger Mouse, to produce the album, whom Albarn praised as "one of the best young producers in the world" after hearing his 2004 mashup album The Grey Album. Burton felt he and Albarn had a high degree of affinity with each other, stating in an interview on the creation of the album: "We never had any arguments. We even have that finish-each-other's-sentences thing happening. There are a lot of the same influences between us, like Ennio Morricone and psychedelic pop-rock, but he has 10 years on me, so I have some catching up to do. Where he can school me on new wave and punk of the late '70s/early '80s, I can school him on a lot of hip-hop. We're very competitive and pushed each other." Similar to the first album, Demon Days features collaborations with several different artists, including Bootie Brown, Shaun Ryder, Ike Turner, MF Doom (who was recording with Danger Mouse as Danger Doom at the time) and Martina Topley-Bird, among others.

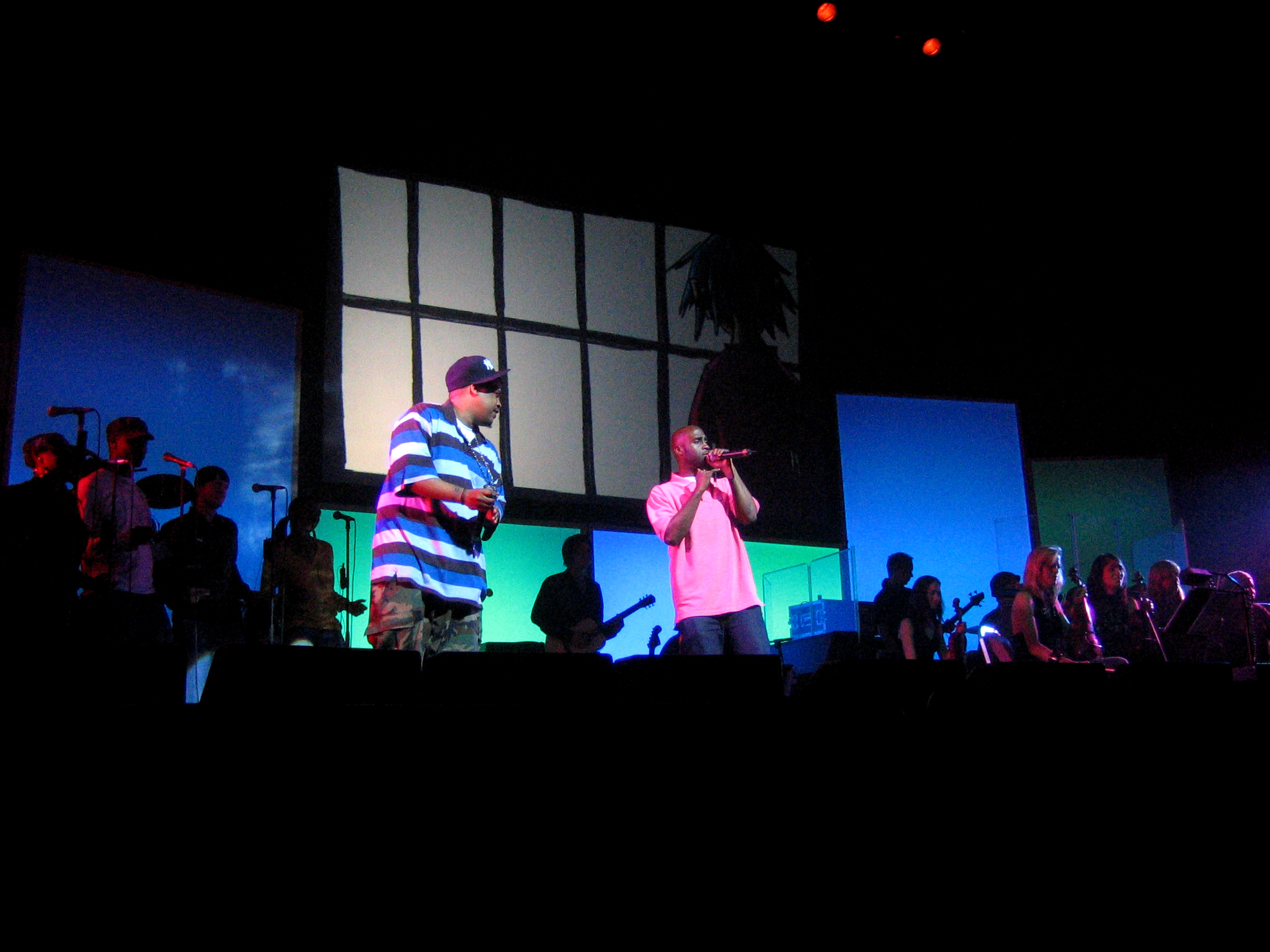
The band performed in silhouette during the Demon Days Live performances (pictured here with De La Soul on stage).

The band chose to forgo traditional live touring in support of Demon Days, instead limiting live performance during the album cycle to a five night residency in November 2005 at the Manchester Opera House billed as Demon Days Live. The concerts saw the band performing the album in full each night with most featured artists from the album present. Unlike the debut album's tour, the touring band was visible on stage in view of the audience but obscured by lighting in such a way that only their silhouettes were visible, with a screen above the band displaying Hewlett's visuals alongside each song. The residency was later repeated in April 2006 at New York City's Apollo Theater and the Manchester performances were later released on DVD as Demon Days: Live at the Manchester Opera House. As part of their promotion of the album in Latin America, the band was interviewed in September 2005 on the live-action Mexican show Rebelde. This episode also included the Latin American premiere of the music video for "Dare".

The virtual Gorillaz members "performed" at the 2005 MTV Europe Music Awards in November 2005 and again at the 48th Annual Grammy Awards in February 2006, appearing to perform on stage via Musion Eyeliner technology. Albarn later expressed disappointment at the execution of the performance, citing the low volume level required so as to not disturb the technology: "That was tough... They started and it was so quiet cause they've got this piece of film that you've got to pull over the stage so any bass frequencies would just mess up the illusion completely." At the Grammys, the band won Best Pop Collaboration with Vocals for "Feel Good Inc.", which was also nominated for Record of the Year. Albarn and Hewlett explored the idea of producing a full "live holographic tour" featuring the virtual Gorillaz appearing on stage with Musion Eyeliner technology after the Grammys performance, but the tour was ultimately never realised due to the tremendous expense and logistical issues that would have resulted.

In October 2006 the band released the book Rise of the Ogre. Presented as an autobiography of the band ostensibly written by the fictional members and expanding on the band's fictional backstory and universe, the book was actually written by official Gorillaz script writer and live drummer Cass Browne and featured new artwork by Hewlett. Later the same month, the band released another DVD, Phase Two: Slowboat to Hades, compiling much of the band's visual content from the album cycle. A second B-sides compilation, D-Sides was released in November 2007, featuring B-sides and remixes associated with Demon Days as well as unreleased tracks from the sessions for the album. In 2008 the documentary film Bananaz was released. Directed by Ceri Levy, it documents the behind-the-scenes history of the band from 2000 to 2006.

=== Plastic Beach and The Fall (2010–2012) ===
Albarn and Hewlett's next project together was the opera Monkey: Journey to the West based on the classical Chinese novel Journey to the West, which premiered at the 2007 Manchester International Festival. While not officially a Gorillaz project, Albarn mentioned in an interview that the project was "Gorillaz, really but we can't call it that for legal reasons".

After completing work on Monkey in late 2007, Albarn and Hewlett began working on a new Gorillaz project entitled Carousel, described by Albarn as being about "the mystical aspects of Britain". Hewlett described Carousel in a 2008 interview as "even bigger and more difficult than Monkey... It's sort of like a film but not with one narrative story. There's many stories, told around a bigger story, set to music, and done in live action, animation, all different styles. Originally it was a film but now we think it's a film and it's a stage thing as well. Damon's written around 70 songs for it, and I've got great plans for the visuals." The Carousel concept was eventually dropped with Albarn and Hewlett's work evolving into the third Gorillaz studio album, Plastic Beach.

Drawing upon environmentalist themes, Plastic Beach was inspired by the idea of a "secret floating island deep in the South Pacific... made up of the detritus, debris and washed up remnants of humanity" inspired by marine pollution such as plastic that Albarn had found in a beach near one of his homes in Devon as well as the Great Pacific Garbage Patch. Unlike previous Gorillaz albums, Albarn made the decision to produce Plastic Beach by himself, with no co-producer. The album was recorded throughout 2008 and 2009 in London, New York City and Syria although production of the album was briefly interrupted so that Albarn could join Blur for a reunion tour in the summer of 2009, with Albarn explaining "there's no way you can do that and that [Blur and Gorillaz] at the same time." Plastic Beach saw Gorillaz move into a more electronic pop sound, with Albarn describing the album as "the most pop record I've ever made" and saying that he took special care to make the album's lyrics and melodies clear and focused compared to previous albums. Plastic Beach also featured the largest cast of collaborators featured yet on a Gorillaz album, fulfilling Albarn's goal of "work[ing] with an incredibly eclectic, surprising cast of people" including artists such as Snoop Dogg, Mos Def, Bobby Womack, Little Dragon, the former Velvet Underground frontman Lou Reed and Gruff Rhys among others, and also included orchestral contributions from Sinfonia Viva and the Syrian National Orchestra for Arabic Music. Albarn explained the expanded roster of featured artists represented his and Hewlett's new vision of Gorillaz as a project, explaining in a July 2008 interview that "Gorillaz now to us is not like four animated characters any more – it's more like an organisation of people doing new projects... That's my ideal model."

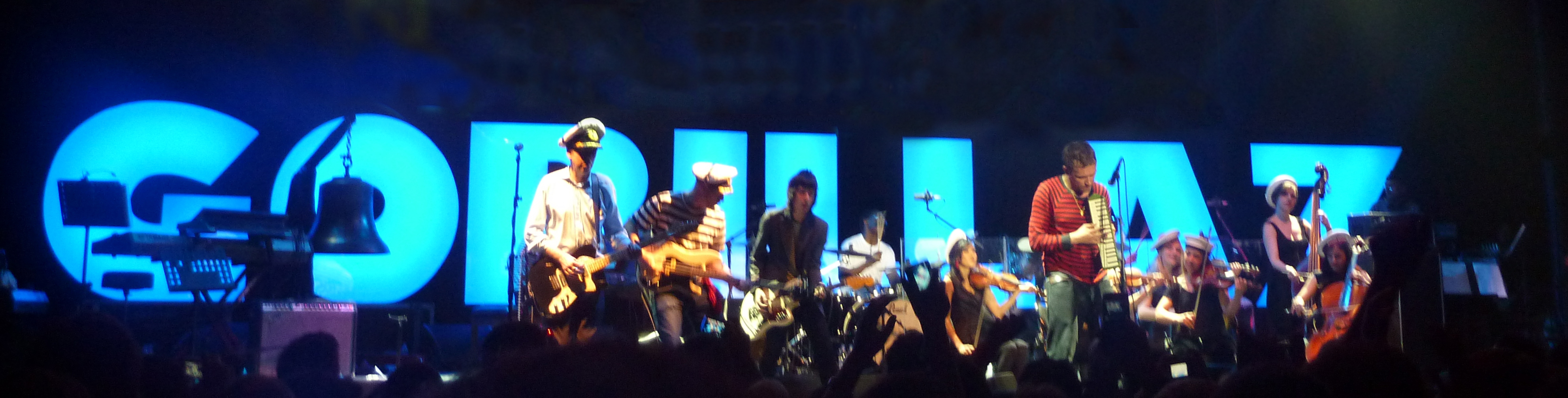
The 2010 live shows supporting Plastic Beach saw the touring band performing in full view of the audience for the first time.

Released on 3 March 2010, Plastic Beach debuted at No. 2 on both the UK Albums Chart and the US Billboard 200 chart, the band's highest placing debut chart position. The album was supported by the lead single "Stylo" featuring Mos Def and Bobby Womack (with Bruce Willis appearing in the music video) released in January 2010 and the later singles "On Melancholy Hill" and "Rhinestone Eyes". To promote the album, the band embarked on the Escape to Plastic Beach Tour, the band's first world tour and also their first live performances in which the touring band performed fully in view of the audience on stage with no visual obstructions. The tour, which featured many of the collaborative artists from Plastic Beach and saw the touring band wearing naval attire, was later described by Albarn as having been extremely costly to produce, with the band barely breaking even on the shows, saying "I loved doing it, but economically it was a fucking disaster." The tour was preceded by headline performances at several international music festivals, including the Coachella and Glastonbury festivals. On 21 November 2010, while still on tour, the band released the non-album single "Doncamatic" featuring British singer Daley.

During the North American leg of the Escape to Plastic Beach tour in the autumn of 2010, Albarn continued recording Gorillaz songs entirely on his iPad. The recordings were later released as the album The Fall, first released digitally on Christmas Day 2010 and later given a physical release on 19 April 2011. The Fall is also co-produced by Stephen Sedgwick, the mixer engineer of the band. Albarn said the album served as a diary of the American leg of the tour, explaining that the tracks were presented exactly as they were on the day they were written and recorded with no additional production or overdubs: "I literally made it on the road. I didn't write it before, I didn't prepare it. I just did it day by day as a kind of diary of my experience in America. If I left it until the New Year to release it then the cynics out there would say, 'Oh well, it's been tampered with', but if I put it out now they'd know that I haven't done anything because I've been on tour ever since." The band later released a "Gorillaz edition" of the Korg iElectribe music production app for iPad, featuring many of the same samples and sounds used by Albarn to create The Fall.

On 23 February 2012 Gorillaz released "DoYaThing", a single to promote a Gorillaz-branded collection of Converse shoes which were released shortly after. The song was a part of Converse's "Three Artists, One Song" project, with the two additional collaborators being James Murphy of LCD Soundsystem and André 3000 of Outkast. Two different edits of the song were released: a four-and-a-half minute radio edit released on Converse's website and the full 13-minute version of the song released on the Gorillaz website. Hewlett returned to direct the single's music video, featuring fictionalised animated versions of Murphy and André interacting with Gorillaz' virtual members. The song received positive reviews from critics, with particular praise given to André 3000's contributions to the track.

In April 2012 Albarn told The Guardian that he and Hewlett had fallen out and that future Gorillaz projects were "unlikely". Tension between the two had been building, partly due to a belief held by Hewlett that his contributions to Gorillaz were being minimised. Speaking to The Guardian in April 2017, Hewlett explained: "Damon had half the Clash on stage, and Bobby Womack and Mos Def and De La Soul, and fucking Hypnotic Brass Ensemble and Bashy and everyone else. It was the greatest band ever. And the screen on stage behind them seemed to get smaller every day. I'd say, 'Have we got a new screen?' and the tour manager was like, 'No, it's the same screen.' Because it seemed to me like it was getting smaller." Albarn gave his side of the story in a separate interview, saying "I think we were at a cross purposes somewhat on that last record [Plastic Beach], which is a shame. It was one of those things, the music and the videos weren't working as well together, but I felt we'd made a really good record and I was into it." In an April 2012 interview with Metro, Albarn was more optimistic about Gorillaz' future, saying that once he had worked out his differences with Hewlett, he was sure that they would make another record. In June 2013, Hewlett confirmed that he and Albarn planned to someday continue Gorillaz and record a follow-up album to Plastic Beach, saying "We'll come back to it when the time is right."

=== Hiatus and return with Humanz (2012–2018) ===
Following the release of "DoYaThing" and the making public of Albarn and Hewlett's fall-out in 2012, Gorillaz entered a multiyear hiatus. During that time, Albarn released a solo album, Everyday Robots, scored stage productions and continued to record and tour with Blur, while Hewlett held art exhibitions and attempted to create a film project which was ultimately never realised. While on tour in support of Everyday Robots in 2014, Albarn signalled openness to returning to Gorillaz, telling The National Post that he "wouldn't mind having another stab at a Gorillaz record". Two months later he reported that he had "been writing quite a lot of songs on the road for Gorillaz". and at the end of 2014 confirmed in an interview with The Sydney Morning Herald that he was planning to record another Gorillaz album. Speaking about his relationship with Hewlett, Albarn said that the pair's well-publicised fall-out had helped their relationship in the long term. Hewlett described the moment when he and Albarn agreed to continue Gorillaz at an afterparty after one of Albarn's solo shows in 2014: "We'd had a bit to drink, and he said, 'Do you want to do another one?' And I said, 'Do you?' and he said, 'Do you?' And I said, 'Yeah, sure.' I started work on it straight away, learning to draw the characters again. I played around by myself for eight months while he was performing with Blur in 2015."

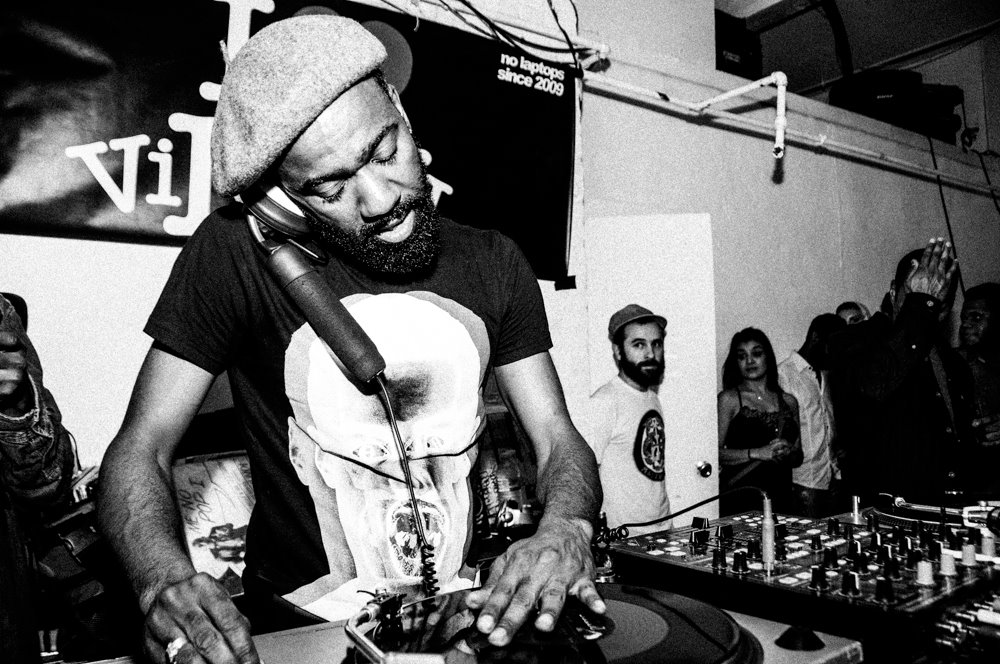
American hip-hop and house producer the Twilite Tone co-produced the band's fifth album Humanz.

Recording sessions for the band's fifth studio album, Humanz, began in late 2015 and continued through 2016, taking place in London, New York City, Paris and Jamaica. Albarn enlisted the American hip-hop and house producer Anthony Khan, known by his stage name the Twilite Tone, to co-produce the album. Albarn chose Khan from a list of possible producers compiled by Parlophone, the band's record label after Albarn and Khan spoke via Skype. Humanz was also co-produced by Remi Kabaka Jr, a friend of Albarn who had worked with him in the non-profit musical organisation Africa Express and also has been the voice actor for the Gorillaz virtual band member Russel Hobbs since 2000. In conceptualising the album, Albarn and Khan envisioned Humanz as being the soundtrack for "a party for the end of the world", with Albarn specifically imagining a future in which Donald Trump won the 2016 US presidential election as context for the album's narrative, explaining, "Let's use that as a kind of dark fantasy for this record, let's imagine the night Donald Trump wins the election and how we're all going to feel that night." Khan stated that "The idea of Donald Trump being president allowed us to create a narrative together. I suggested that the album should be about joy, pain and urgency. That was to be our state of mind before we even touched a keyboard or an MPC. Especially in American music, dare I say black music, there's a way of communicating joy that at the same time allows you to feel the struggle the person has been through. And the urgency is there because something needs to be done. So that was the mantra. I wanted to blend Damon, a Briton, with the joy and pain and struggle that African-American music can express." Humanz again featured a large cast of featured artists, including Popcaan, Vince Staples, DRAM, Jehnny Beth, Pusha T, Peven Everett, Danny Brown, Grace Jones and Mavis Staples, among others. The first track from the album released publicly was "Hallelujah Money" featuring Benjamin Clementine, released on 20 January 2017 with an accompanying video featuring Clementine. While not an official single, Albarn explained that the band chose to release the track on the day of Trump's inauguration because "It was meant to be something sung at the imaginary inauguration of Donald Trump, which turned out to be the real inauguration of Donald Trump, so we released it because we had imagined that happening and it did happen."

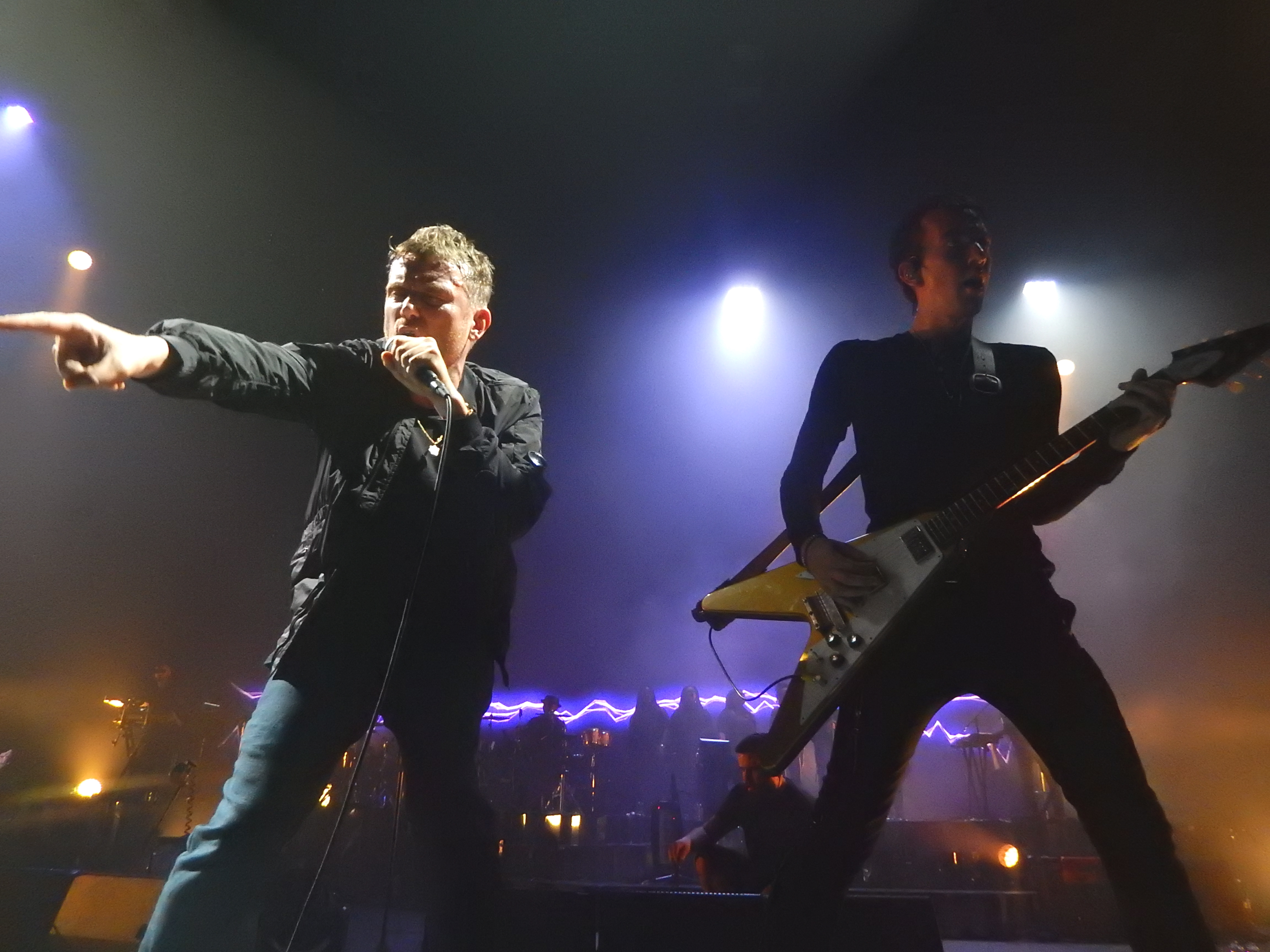
Gorillaz (with Albarn to the left) on stage at the Brixton Academy in London, June 2017

Humanz was released on 28 April 2017, the band's first new studio album in 7 years. Featuring a "modern-sounding urban hip-hop/R&B sensibility", the album debuted at number two on both the UK Albums Chart and the US Billboard 200. Humanz received generally positive reviews from critics, although received some criticism from fans and critics for what was perceived as a diminished presence from Albarn in contrast to the abundance of featured artists. The album was released in both standard and deluxe editions, with the deluxe edition featuring an additional 6 bonus tracks and was promoted by the lead single "Saturnz Barz" featuring Popcaan and the later single "Strobelite" featuring Peven Everett. The Hewlett-directed music video for "Saturnz Barz" made use of YouTube's 360-degree video format and reportedly cost $800,000 to create.

The band embarked on the Humanz Tour to support the album from the summer of 2017 to early 2018. Like the band's previous tour, the Humanz Tour featured the touring band in full view of the audience with a large screen behind them displaying Hewlett-created visuals and featured several of the different collaborative artists from the band's history. The tour was preceded by a handful of European warm-up shows, including the first Demon Dayz Festival held on 10 June 2017 at the Dreamland Margate theme park, a Gorillaz curated music festival which was later repeated in Los Angeles in October 2018. On 8 June 2017 the band released the non-album single "Sleeping Powder" with an accompanying music video and on 3 November 2017 a "Super Deluxe" version of Humanz, featuring an additional 14 unreleased tracks from the album's sessions, including alternative versions of previously released songs as well as the single "Garage Palace" featuring Little Simz.

During this tour, Gorillaz collaborated with German electric company E.ON. Using solar power, they created a music video for "We Got the Power". They too created an RV, also solar powered, used as a mobile recording studio. Gorillaz recruited aspiring local artists to create a three-track long EP titled Gorillaz x E.ON: A Solar Collaboration. Gorillaz's three stops were in Margate, England, where the artists Lao Ra, Lully, and Throwing Shade recorded "Frequency (No Dormir)"; Budapest, Hungary, where the artists Ress (rapper), Kapitány Máté, and Kram Berev recorded "Szél"; and Munich, Germany, where the artists MazeOne and RIP Swirl recorded "Meadows".

=== The Now Now (2018–2019) ===
Albarn continued recording while on the road during the Humanz Tour, and mentioned in an interview with Q Magazine in September 2017 that he was planning on releasing the material as a future Gorillaz album. Comparing the production of the album to The Fall, which was also recorded while the band was on tour, Albarn mentioned that "It will be a more complete record than The Fall, but hopefully have that spontaneity." Albarn signalled his desire to complete and release the album quickly, adding that "I really like the idea of making new music and playing it live almost simultaneously" and "If we're going to do more Gorillaz we don't want to wait seven years because, y'know, we're getting on a bit now. During a September 2017 concert in Seattle, the band debuted a new song, "Ode to Idaho", which was later included on the album as "Idaho". During the performance Albarn stated it had been written in the days prior.

During a break in the Humanz Tour in February 2018, Albarn returned to London, where he worked with the producer James Ford, known for his work with Arctic Monkeys and Florence and the Machine, and Kabaka Jr. to finish the newly written material, resulting in the band's sixth studio album, The Now Now, released on 29 June 2018. Featuring "simple, mostly upbeat songs" and 1980s new wave influences, the album was noted for its distinctly small list of featured artists compared to previous Gorillaz work, with only two tracks featuring any outside artists (the album's lead single "Humility" featuring George Benson and "Hollywood" featuring Snoop Dogg and Jamie Principle). Albarn mentioned that the few numbers of featured artists was partially due to the album's quick production, which in turn was a result of Albarn wanting to finish the album before the band's touring schedule resumed: "We've been very lucky to be offered all the festivals this year on the back of the last record [Humanz]... but I didn't want to do that unless I had something new to work with, so the only option was to make another record really quickly and not have lots of guests on it, because that takes a long time to organize; just do it all myself, really." Albarn also explained that with The Now Now he sought to make a Gorillaz album "where I'm just singing for once" and that the album is "pretty much just me singing, very sort of in the world of 2-D."

In the fictional Gorillaz storyline, the band introduced Ace from Cartoon Network's animated series The Powerpuff Girls as a temporary bassist of the band during The Now Now album cycle, filling in for the imprisoned Murdoc Niccals. Explaining the crossover in an interview with the BBC, Albarn said "We were massive fans of The Powerpuff Girls when they came out, the energy of that cartoon was really cool, and we kind of know the creator of it (Craig McCracken). It was a very organic thing."

The band's remaining 2018 live dates were billed as The Now Now Tour to support the album, and included a performance in Tokyo on 22 June 2018 billed as "The Now Now World Premiere" in which the band played the full album live for the first and only time, a performance which was later broadcast by Boiler Room. On 16 December 2019, the documentary Gorillaz: Reject False Icons was screened worldwide on a one-day theatrical release. Filmed and directed by Hewlett's son Denholm, the documentary showcases a behind-the-scenes look at the production of Humanz and The Now Now as well as the album's associated tours. One week after the film's theatrical release, a "Director's Cut" version of the film featuring additional footage was released on the official Gorillaz YouTube channel in three parts. In the credits for Reject False Icons, Kabaka Jr was listed as an official member of the band (labelled as "A&R/Producer") alongside Albarn and Hewlett for the first time.

=== Song Machine project and Meanwhile EP (2020–2021) ===
On 29 January 2020 the band announced its new project Song Machine. Eschewing the typical album format of releasing music, Song Machine is instead a web series that sees the band releasing one new song a month as "episodes" to the series, with 11 episodes released to comprise the first "season". Elaborating on the idea behind Song Machine in a radio interview shortly after the announcement of the project, Albarn explained that "We no longer kind of see ourselves as constrained to making albums. We can now make episodes and seasons." Each episode features previously unannounced guest musicians on new Gorillaz material, with the first being "Momentary Bliss", which was released on 31 January and features both the British rapper Slowthai and the Kent-based punk-rock duo Slaves. Upon the premiere of "Momentary Bliss", Albarn revealed that the group had been in the studio with Schoolboy Q and Sampa the Great among others, although he did say that these songs were likely to be saved for future episodes of Song Machine. The group also teased a possible collaboration with the Australian band Tame Impala on Instagram.

On 27 February the band released the second episode of Song Machine entitled "Désolé". The song features the Malian singer Fatoumata Diawara. The third episode, "Aries", released on 9 April and featured Peter Hook and Georgia. The fourth track "How Far?" featuring Tony Allen and Skepta was released 2 May. This song was released without an accompanying music video as a tribute to Allen, who died on 30 April. On 26 May Gorillaz announced the release of a new book titled Gorillaz Almanac. The book comes in three editions: standard, deluxe and super deluxe, all of which were set to release on 23 October but has since been delayed to 22 December with a physical release of season one of Song Machine included with each copy. On 9 June the band released "Friday 13th", the fourth episode of Song Machine. The track features the French-British rapper Octavian. On 20 July the band released "Pac-Man", the fifth episode of Song Machine, in honour of Pac-Man's 40th anniversary. The track features the American rapper Schoolboy Q.

On 9 September the band released "Strange Timez", the sixth episode of Song Machine. The track features Robert Smith, from the Cure. Gorillaz also announced the title and tracklist for Song Machine, Season One: Strange Timez, released on 23 October 2020, featuring further guest appearances from Elton John, 6lack, JPEGMafia, Kano, Roxani Arias, Moonchild Sanelly and Chai, among others. On 1 October the band released "The Pink Phantom", the seventh episode of Song Machine. The track features John and the American R&B recording artist 6lack. Before the release of Song Machine, Season One: Strange Timez, Gorillaz started a radio show on Apple Music called Song Machine Radio where each virtual character has a turn to invite special guests and play some of their favourite tunes. A few days ahead of the release of Song Machine, Season One: Strange Timez, Albarn revealed that he had written a song for the project's second season.

On 5 November the band released "The Valley of the Pagans", the eighth episode of Song Machine. The track features the American singer Beck. The music video is known for being the first major studio production filmed in Grand Theft Auto V. The video ends with a reference to previous album, Plastic Beach. For unknown reasons, the music video on the official Gorillaz YouTube channel was set to private just a few days after its initial premiere. On 9 March 2021 Gorillaz uploaded an alternative version of the music video to their official YouTube channel, which does not feature any gameplay from Grand Theft Auto V. On 24 December the band released "The Lost Chord", the ninth and final episode of the first season of Song Machine. The track features the British musician Leee John.

On 26 March 2021, the band celebrated its debut album's 20th anniversary with oncoming reissues of their catalogue and teases of non-fungible tokens; due to its impact on climate change, the latter was met with criticism by various sources and fans—some noting that the act contradicts the environmental themes of Plastic Beach. No non-fungible tokens have since released. The band also announced a boxset, the G Collection, containing six of their studio albums—excluding The Fall—for Record Store Day. On 10 August 2021, Gorillaz debuted three new songs, "Meanwhile" (featuring British rapper Jelani Blackman), "Jimmy Jimmy" (featuring the British rapper AJ Tracey), and "Déjà Vu" (featuring the Jamaican-British singer Alicaì Harley), during a free concert at the O_{2} Arena in London, England exclusively for National Health Service employees and their families. They then performed them again at the subsequent concert open to the public the next day (both of which served as the first live audience concerts of the Song Machine Tour). These three songs were announced to be tracks from a new EP entitled Meanwhile, with the cover originally published on TikTok.

=== World tour and Cracker Island (2022–2024) ===
On 17 September 2021, Albarn revealed that he had recorded a new Gorillaz song with Bad Bunny whilst in Jamaica, and, at the time, said it would be the first single for a new album, influenced by Latin America, released in 2022. The concept for the album would later change, with the song being announced at a later date. On 31 August 2022 the name of this song was revealed to be "Tormenta". In November 2021 Albarn announced that an animated film based on the band was being produced at Netflix, but by February 2023 it had been cancelled.

Throughout 2022 Gorillaz went on a world tour in South America, Europe, Australia and North America, where they debuted new material. In June 2022 the band began teasing the release of new material, with promotional displays and websites surfacing encouraging fans to sign up to be a part of "The Last Cult". The band released a new single (regularly performed on tour) called "Cracker Island", featuring Thundercat and produced with Greg Kurstin, on 22 June, with the music video being released on 28 July. Their scheduled performance at the first Splendour in the Grass festival in Queensland, Australia on 22 July was cancelled owing to torrential rain. In July 2022 they played at the Adelaide Entertainment Centre as part of Illuminate Adelaide, supported by Moonchild Sanelly. In August 2022 the band performed the new song "New Gold" (featuring Tame Impala and Bootie Brown) at All Points East in London, and released it as their second single for their eighth studio album, announced on the same day to be titled Cracker Island (released on 24 February 2023). The album, produced with Kurstin, also features appearances from Stevie Nicks, Bad Bunny, Beck, and Adeleye Omotayo. On 4 November the band released the third single from Cracker Island, "Baby Queen" (previously released on the FIFA 23 soundtrack). On 8 December the band released the album's fourth single, "Skinny Ape", alongside the announcement of two virtual shows in Times Square and Piccadilly Circus on 17 and 18 December, respectively. On 27 January 2023 the album's fifth single, "Silent Running" featuring Adeleye Omotayo, was released, with a music video following on 8 February. The album received mostly positive reviews, with Stephen Thomas Erlewine describing it as "less an exploration of new sonic territory so much as it is a reaffirmation of [Albarn's] strengths" with "a clean, efficient energy".

On 27 February 2023, a deluxe version of Cracker Island was released with five bonus tracks. The previous collaborators Del the Funky Homosapien and De La Soul appeared on the deluxe version, as well as the Brazilian artist MC Binn. The album was nominated for Best Alternative Music Album for the 66th Annual Grammy Awards in 2024.

=== 25th anniversary and The Mountain (2025–present) ===
To celebrate their 25th anniversary, Gorillaz released a video on 29 January 2025 titled Nostalgiaz, featuring clips from their music videos set to "Pirate's Progress" from Plastic Beach. In March, during an interview with the French magazine Les Inrockuptibles, Albarn said he was finishing a new Gorillaz album. On 8 August 2025 the band launched an exhibition at London's Copper Box called "House of Kong", which ran until 3 September. This included a set of daily live performances where they performed their first three albums and a fourth "mystery" show; their self-titled debut album on 29 August, Demon Days on 30 August, and Plastic Beach on 2 September. On 26 August the band were added to the video game Fortnite Festival as part of the game's tenth season. For the closing "mystery" show of the "House of Kong" exhibition on 3 September, the band revealed the new album in full, playing 15 songs from the album with no encores. The performance had multiple guests, including Sparks, Yasiin Bey, Omar Souleyman, Asha Bhosle and Johnny Marr, but the title of the album was not disclosed.

On 11 September 2025, the band officially announced their ninth album, The Mountain, with a release date of 27 February 2026. Its lead single, "The Happy Dictator", featuring Sparks, was released concurrently with the announcement. The album is being promoted during the Mountain Tour, with concerts in Europe, America and Asia between March 2026 and January 2027, including the band's first ever performances in India.

On 7 March 2026, the band played live on the American television programme Saturday Night Live, performing "Clint Eastwood" featuring Del the Funky Homosapien and "The Moon Cave" featuring Asha Puthli, Black Thought and Anoushka Shankar.

== Style and legacy ==
Writers and critics have variously described Gorillaz as art pop, alternative rock, hip-hop, electronic, trip hop, pop, dark pop, alternative hip-hop, rap rock, indie rock, bedroom pop, dance-rock, new wave, funk, worldbeat and experimental rock. The band's aesthetic and general approach have been described as postmodern. According to AllMusic, Gorillaz blend Britpop and hip-hop, while The Guardian described the band as "a sort of dub/hip-hop/lo-fi indie/world music hybrid". According to PopMatters, the band's early work foreshadowed "the melding of hip-hop, rock, and electronic elements in pop music" that grew in significance in the next decade.

"[Influencing] to us, is the greatest achievement of Gorillaz. It's that we know that a very large percentage of our audience are kids, who go on gorillaz.com, who go on gorillaz-unofficial.com, and through seeing the cartoons and hearing the tune, buying the record, are finding out about this stuff that they knew nothing about. So they're learning about Vlad The Impaler, or Ronald Searle, or The Specials... so it's like an education. They really get into it. And they discover it, the music we grew up on."

— Jamie Hewlett,

Gorillaz' main musical influences include Fishmans, Massive Attack, the Specials, Big Audio Dynamite, Public Image Ltd, Tom Tom Club, Fun Boy Three, Unkle, A Tribe Called Quest, and their fellow collaborators De La Soul, as well as the Human League, the Kinks, XTC, Simple Minds, Sonic Youth, Pavement, Ween, Portishead, Beck, Wire, Fela Kuti, Sly and the Family Stone, Earth Wind and Fire, Augustus Pablo, Zapp and DJ Kool Herc. Gorillaz' primary visual influences include Hanna-Barbera, Looney Tunes, Mad magazine, The Simpsons, 2000 AD and Métal hurlant (Heavy Metal). Furthermore, Hewlett has also cited European artists such as Carl Giles, Ronald Searle, Moebius, Tanino Liberatore, Mike McMahon and Brendan McCarthy. The idea for Gorillaz was inspired by the many cartoon bands that came before them in the 1960s such as the Banana Splits, the Archies, Josie and the Pussycats, and Alvin and the Chipmunks, and real bands with fictional stage personas like ABC (circa How to Be a ... Zillionaire!) and Silicon Teens.

Musical artists and bands who have been influenced by Gorillaz's work include Major Lazer, Dethklok, Rat Boy, Chromeo, Flume, Foster the People, the 1975, 5 Seconds of Summer, Awolnation, Paramore, Grimes, Kesha, A.G. Cook, Finneas, Oliver Tree, Flatbush Zombies, Vic Mensa, IDK, Trippie Redd, the Internet, ASAP Rocky, Lupe Fiasco, Brockhampton, Odd Future, Machine Gun Kelly and Billie Eilish, who was joined by Albarn to sing her song, "Getting Older", and Gorillaz' song, "Feel Good Inc." with Posdnuos of De La Soul.

== Band members ==
=== Virtual members ===
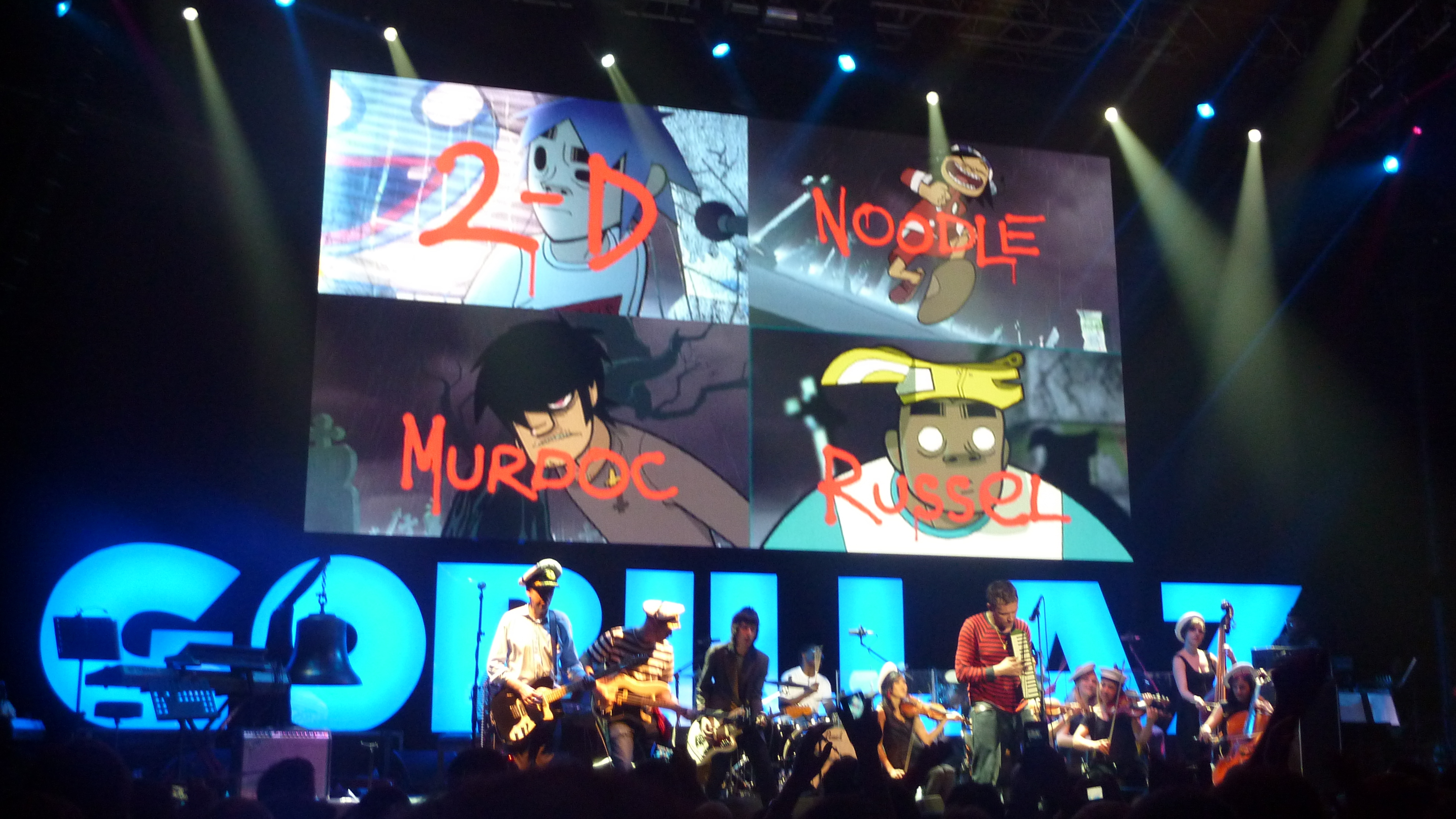
A graphic on-stage at the Escape to Plastic Beach Tour showing the virtual members.

Current

- 2-D – lead vocals, melodica, keyboards, piano, occasional rhythm guitar, music (1998–present)
- Murdoc Niccals – bass guitar (1998–present), drum machine (2008–2012) (Note: Murdoc was briefly in hiatus from the band in 2018 during the course of The Now Now due to being in jail, leading to Ace becoming his temporary replacement.)
- Noodle – guitar, keyboards, piano, backing and occasional lead vocals, occasional rhythm guitar (1998–2006; 2012–present)
- Russel Hobbs – drums, percussion, drum machine (1998–2006; 2012–present)

Murdoc Faust Niccals is the bassist for the band. He is voiced by Phil Cornwell and was created by Damon Albarn and Jamie Hewlett. Murdoc is based on the Rolling Stones guitarist Keith Richards, Victor Frankenstein and Creeper from Scooby-Doo. In particular, he was inspired by a photograph of the Rolling Stones taken in 1968 by the photographer David Bailey. Once described by Hewlett as being the "unpleasant villain of the band". Murdoc is a Satanist who is often depicted wearing an inverted cross necklace, with "Hail Satan" being a common catchphrase of his. He was created by Hewlett and Albarn in 1998, with his first official appearance being Gorillaz' debut EP, Tomorrow Comes Today, in 2000.

Stuart Harold "2-D" Pot provides the lead vocals and plays the keyboard for the band. 2-D's singing voice is provided by Albarn; while their speaking voice was provided by the actor Nelson De Freitas in various Gorillaz direct-to-video projects such as Phase One: Celebrity Take Down and Phase Two: Slowboat to Hades. In 2017, Kevin Bishop was cast as the new speaking voice of 2-D. 2-D was created by Albarn and Hewlett in 1998. In December 2025, Albarn and Hewlett revealed that 2-D was likely non-binary, using they/them pronouns for them for the first time in an interview with Dazed.

Noodle provides the lead guitar and keyboards, as well as some occasional vocals for the band. Like all other band members of Gorillaz, she was created in 1998 by Albarn and Hewlett. Originally from Japan, Noodle has been voiced by Haruka Kuroda, Miho Hatori of Cibo Matto, and Haruka Abe. Noodle was originally conceptualised by Hewlett as a 17-year-old girl named Paula Cracker, but Albarn noted that the character was too similar to the characters that Hewlett is typically known for drawing, and recommended he should attempt to create "something different". Taking Albarn's advice, Hewlett designed an illustration of a 10-year-old Japanese girl named Noodle who is a martial arts expert. In October 2016, Noodle became the global ambassador for Jaguar Racing, appearing in a short commercial advertising the company.

Russel Hobbs was originally conceptualised by Hewlett and Albarn in 1998 as a metafictional representation of the hip-hop aspects of Gorillaz, embodying the spirit of the band's collaborations with various rappers over the years. He is referenced in the lyrics to the Gorillaz track "Clint Eastwood". He was originally inspired by Hewlett's love for hip-hop artists like Ice Cube (the cousin of the rapper Del the Funky Homosapien, who raps on "Clint Eastwood" and "Rock the House" as Del the Ghost Rapper). Russel's speaking voice is provided by the percussionist and DJ Remi Kabaka Jr, who has been an actual percussionist and producer for Gorillaz since Humanz in 2017. Russel's fictional backstory of being possessed by the spirits of dead musicians is what originally inspired the usage of collaborators and guests on Gorillaz' albums.

Former

- Paula Cracker – guitar (1998)
- Cyborg Noodle – guitar, backing and occasional lead vocals, music (2008–2010)
- Ace – bass guitar (2018)

Ace, a character from the Gangreen Gang, a green-skinned gang from the Powerpuff Girls universe. Ace was Murdoc's substitute during the time Murdoc was in prison and is the bassist on The Now Now (2018). Cyborg Noodle, Noodle's substitute on guitar and a robotic version of herself, while the latter was lost somewhere in Japan. Cyborg Noodle's appearance is only used for the Plastic Beach phase. Paula Cracker was the band's earlier guitarist and 2-D's former girlfriend, when the band was named Gorilla, until Noodle's arrival on guitar.

=== Non-virtual members ===
Touring

2001–2002 (Gorillaz Live)	Damon Albarn – lead vocals, keyboards, rhythm guitar, piano, melodica; Mike Smith – keyboards; Cass Browne – drums, percussion, drum machine; Darren Galea – turntables; Simon Katz – lead guitar; Junior Dan – bass (2001); Roberto Occhipinti – bass (2002)
2005–2006 (Demon Days Live)	Damon Albarn – lead vocals, piano, melodica; Mike Smith – keyboards; Cass Browne – drums; Darren Galea – turntables; Simon Tong – guitar; Karl Vanden Bossche – percussion; Simon Jones – rhythm guitar; Morgan Nicholls – bass
2010 (Escape to Plastic Beach Tour)	Damon Albarn – lead vocals, keyboards, piano, melodica, acoustic guitar; Mike Smith – keyboards; Cass Browne – drums, drum machine; Simon Tong – lead guitar (replaced Jeff Wootton on some dates); Mick Jones – guitar, backing vocals; Paul Simonon – bass guitar, backing vocals; Jesse Hackett – keyboards; Jeff Wootton – lead guitar; Gabriel Wallace – drums, percussion
2017–2018 (Humanz Tour and the Now Now Tour)	Damon Albarn – lead vocals, piano, keyboards, rhythm guitar; Mike Smith – keyboards, backing vocals; Karl Vanden Bossche – electronic drums, percussion; Jesse Hackett – keyboards; Jeff Wootton – lead guitar; Gabriel Wallace – drums, percussion; Seye Adelekan – bass guitar, acoustic guitar, backing vocals
2020–2023 (Song Machine Tour and World Tour 2022)	Damon Albarn – lead vocals, piano, keyboards, rhythm guitar; Mike Smith – keyboards, backing vocals; Karl Vanden Bossche – drums, percussion; Jesse Hackett – keyboards (2020–2022); Jeff Wootton – lead guitar; Seye Adelekan – bass guitar, acoustic guitar, backing vocals; Remi Kabaka Jr. – percussion; Femi Koleoso – drums
2025–present (House of Kong and the Mountain Tour)	Damon Albarn – lead vocals, piano, keyboards, rhythm guitar; Mike Smith – keyboards, backing vocals; Karl Vanden Bossche – drums, percussion; Jeff Wootton – lead guitar; Seye Adelekan – bass guitar, acoustic guitar, backing vocals; Jaega Mckenna-Gordon – drums; Ruth O'Mahony-Brady – keyboards

== Discography ==
=== Studio albums ===
- Gorillaz (2001)
- Demon Days (2005)
- Plastic Beach (2010)
- The Fall (2010)
- Humanz (2017)
- The Now Now (2018)
- Song Machine, Season One: Strange Timez (2020)
- Cracker Island (2023)
- The Mountain (2026)

== Tours ==
- Gorillaz Live (2001–2002)
- Demon Days Live (2005–2006)
- Escape to Plastic Beach Tour (2010)
- Humanz Tour (2017–2018)
- The Now Now Tour (2018)
- Song Machine Tour (2020–2021)
- Gorillaz World Tour 2022 (2022)
- The Mountain Tour (2026–2027)
