= Rock the House (Gorillaz song) =

Single by Gorillaz featuring Del the Funky Homosapien

from the album Gorillaz
- B-side: "The Sounder"; "Faust"; "Ghost Train"
- Released: 22 October 2001 (UK); 20 November 2001 (US)
- Recorded: 2000
- Genre: Rap rock; pop rap
- Length: 4:09 (album version); 3:03 (radio edit)
- Label: Parlophone
- Songwriters: Damon Albarn; John Dankworth; Teren Jones; Daniel Nakamura
- Producers: Gorillaz; Dan the Automator; Jason Cox; Tom Girling

Gorillaz singles chronology
"19-2000" (2001)	"Rock the House" (2001)	"911" (2001)

Del the Funky Homosapien singles chronology
"Clint Eastwood" (2001)	"Rock the House" (2001)	"Workin' It" (2008)

Music video
- "Rock the House" on YouTube

"Rock the House" is a song from Gorillaz's self-titled debut album. It was released as the third single from the album in October 2001. It peaked at number 18 on the UK Singles Chart. The song features a horn section loop sampled from "Modesty Blaise", a piece by British jazz musician John Dankworth. Del the Funky Homosapien is the only artist to provide vocals for the song.

== Music video ==
The music video for "Rock the House" was directed by Jamie Hewlett and Pete Candeland. The inspiration for the video is said to have come from Hewlett's angst at the time, as the band was going through the process of being sued by another band named Monkey Tennis, nicknamed the Doppelgangerz in the book Rise of the Ogre, who claimed that Gorillaz was a stolen idea.

At the time we were being sued by someone who claimed he'd 'invented' Gorillaz and was demanding rights over my music, brain, image and face, which obviously made my blood boil. It felt like we were under attack from a hail of bullets. So we took that feeling and made it visual, into a video!

The video opens with a focused shot of Kong Studios' entrance, before transitioning to Noodle cycling through the building's corridors. The camera enters a room where the Gorillaz are engaged in a performance, when suddenly, a mysterious white fog envelops the stage, causing Russel to faint. Then the floor has turned into the ghost of Del, who rises up and throws the band to the ground. Del is outfitted with protective gear including a helmet. In Rise of the Ogre, it explains he is dressed as Mr. Freedom. He takes a few steps, when from behind a series of spring-loaded guns shoot billiard balls at him, but he diverts them with his glove. A series of inflatable female gorillas appear and start to do cheerleading. 2-D is dodging the balls being shot at him by doing dance moves, but then he is hit by a few balls and knocked out. Murdoc then begins to divert the balls with a padded jockstrap he is wearing, hitting them away with his pelvic thrusts. He is successful a dozen times until a ball ricochets off the wall and strikes his unprotected buttocks. The ball hits Russel in the head, waking him up and causing Del to vanish. The final shot is simply the first one played in reverse.

== Track listing ==
Benelux 2-track CD single

1. "Rock the House" (featuring Del the Funky Homosapien) (album version) – 4:09
2. "The Sounder" (featuring Phi Life Cypher) – 6:16

European and UK CD maxi-single 1; Australian CD maxi-single

1. "Rock the House" (featuring Del the Funky Homosapien) (radio edit) – 3:03
2. "The Sounder" (featuring Phi Life Cypher) (edit) – 4:29
3. "Faust" – 3:51
4. "Rock the House" (teaser trailer / video) – 0:29

European and UK CD maxi-single 2

1. "Rock the House" (featuring Del the Funky Homosapien) (album version) – 4:09
2. "Ghost Train" – 3:54
3. "19-2000" – 3:30
4. "19-2000" (video) – 4:00
5. "19-2000" (Geep Simulator trailer / video) – 0:10

UK cassette single

1. "Rock the House" (featuring Del the Funky Homosapien) (radio edit) – 3:03
2. "The Sounder" (featuring Phi Life Cypher) (edit) – 4:29
3. "Ghost Train" – 3:54

== Fictional background ==
In Rise of the Ogre, 2-D claims to have "played some divvy panpipes" for "Rock the House" during a track-by-track of the Gorillaz album. Murdoc is stunned by this and repeats his disbelief briefly during the section on the video. Though the track was selected for a single and received generally good reactions, Rise of the Ogre claims that Gorillaz were never particularly satisfied with "Rock the House", with Murdoc expressing his opinions by claiming he "won this song in a raffle" and 2-D thinking that the track should not have made it on the album at all. For the radio edit of the song, the line which features the words "Shake your ass-crack" is cut. Instead, the edit features the orchestral type sound, which features after the trumpet riff at the start of the song, so that the last two words are not heard.

== Personnel ==
- Del the Funky Homosapien – vocals
- Damon Albarn – flute, piano
- Dan the Automator – sampled loops
- Junior Dan – bass guitar
- Tom Girling – Pro Tools, engineering
- Jason Cox – engineering
- Howie Weinberg – mastering
