= 19-2000 =

2001 single by Gorillaz

Single by Gorillaz

from the album Gorillaz
- B-side: "Left Hand Suzuki Method"; "Hip Albatross"
- Released: 25 June 2001
- Genre: Trip hop; dub; funk
- Length: 3:30
- Label: Parlophone; EMI; Virgin America
- Songwriters: Damon Albarn; Jamie Hewlett
- Producers: Gorillaz; Dan the Automator; Tom Girling; Jason Cox

Gorillaz singles chronology
"Clint Eastwood" (2001)	"19-2000" (2001)	"Rock the House" (2001)

Music videos
- "19-2000" on YouTube
- "19-2000" (Soulchild Remix) on YouTube

"19-2000", sometimes written "19/2000" and also known as "Get the Cool Shoeshine", is a song from British virtual band Gorillaz' self-titled debut album Gorillaz. It was the second single from the album, released on 25 June 2001 in the United Kingdom. "19-2000" reached number six on the UK Singles Chart and number 34 on the US Billboard Mainstream Top 40 chart. It was particularly successful in New Zealand, where it reached number one for a week in September 2001.

== Background ==
"19-2000" was accompanied by a completely new version of the song, called the "Soulchild Remix", which was produced by music producers Damien Mendis and Stuart Bradbury. Mendis was asked to remix a track off the album in the hope that it would give it crossover potential, in the same way as the Ed Case remix of "Clint Eastwood" had. Mendis was given a copy of all their demos and finished tracks for the album, being told to "pick [a song] that you can produce, remix or whatever into a hit single". Mendis was unsure which track to choose, and only when he was told that Jamie Hewlett was already working on the video for "19-2000", did he make his decision. Tina Weymouth and Miho Hatori contributed backing vocals to "19–2000", whilst Damon Albarn performed the vocals on the verses.

== Music video ==
The video, directed by Jamie Hewlett and Pete Candeland, blends traditional animation with computer animation. It features the Gorillaz driving their Geep (as seen on the cover of the album) along a twisting highway. Their journey includes conquering a vertical loop, jumping over a gap in the road, and being pursued by a UFO. Eventually, they face a colossal moose, which Murdoc attempts to obliterate with a pair of missiles. However, the moose sneezes at the last second, redirecting the missiles towards the Geep. The resulting explosion sends the vehicle skidding down the road and leaves the Gorillaz covered in black ash.

Two versions of the video exist, one tailored to the original mix and another to the Soulchild remix. Within the video, road signs point towards Amity (a reference to Jaws), the Overlook Hotel (a reference to The Shining), and Camp Crystal (a reference to Friday the 13th). It was shown in the MTV Cribs tour of Kong Studios that the Geep is now parked in the studio's parking lot.

== Remixes ==
=== Gorillaz on My Mind ===
A remix titled "Gorillaz on My Mind" was recorded for the Blade II soundtrack. The remix featured multiple verses from American rapper Redman.

=== Soulchild Remix ===
A remix entitled "19-2000 (Soulchild Remix)" by Soulchild has appeared in a variety of media, including a TV commercial for Ice Breakers, as well as the title theme for the video game FIFA Football 2002.

== Track listings ==
Benelux 2-track CD single

1. "19-2000" (original mix) – 3:30
2. "19-2000" (Soulchild remix) – 3:29

Australian, European, German and UK CD maxi-single

1. "19-2000" – 3:30
2. "19-2000" (Soulchild remix) – 3:29
3. "Left Hand Suzuki Method" – 3:12
4. "19-2000" (2D Interview / video) - 0:30
5. "19-2000" (Computamatic Edit / video) - 3:45
6. "19-2000" (Teaser Trailer / video) - 0:26

European and UK 12-inch vinyl

A1. "19-2000" – 3:30
A2. "Left Hand Suzuki Method" – 3:12
B1. "19-2000" (The Wiseguys House of Wisdom remix) – 7:15

UK cassette single

1. "19-2000" – 3:30
2. "19-2000" (Soulchild remix) – 3:29
3. "Hip Albatross" – 2:42
- The three videos from the enhanced CD are part of "The Making of the Video: Realising the Dream".

== Personnel ==
Personnel are lifted from the UK enhanced CD single liner notes.

- Damon Albarn – vocals, synthesizers, guitar
- Miho Hatori – additional vocals
- Tina Weymouth – additional vocals
- Dan the Automator – sampled loops, additional synthesizers
- Chris Frantz – additional percussion
- Tom Girling – Pro Tools, engineering
- Jason Cox – engineering
- Howie Weinberg – mastering

== Charts ==
=== Weekly charts ===
Chart (2001–2002)	Peak position
Australia (ARIA)	39
Austria (Ö3 Austria Top 40)	16
Belgium (Ultratip Bubbling Under Flanders)	3
Belgium (Ultratop 50 Wallonia)	30
Croatia International Airplay (Top lista)	6
Europe (Eurochart Hot 100)	24
Germany (GfK)	29
Ireland (IRMA)	26
Italy (FIMI)	21
Netherlands (Dutch Top 40)	37
Netherlands (Single Top 100)	42
New Zealand (Recorded Music NZ)	1
Scottish Singles Sales (Official Charts)	5
Sweden (Sverigetopplistan)	24
Switzerland (Schweizer Hitparade)	36
UK Singles (Official Charts)	6
US Alternative Airplay (Billboard)	23
US Pop Airplay (Billboard)	34

=== Year-end charts ===
Chart (2001)	Position
UK Singles (OCC)	113

Chart (2002)	Position
Brazil Airplay (Crowley)	58

Chart (2025)	Position
Argentina Anglo Airplay (Monitor Latino)	74

== Certifications ==
Region	Certification	Certified units/sales
New Zealand (RMNZ)	Gold	15,000^{‡}
United Kingdom (BPI)	Gold	400,000^{‡}
^{‡} Sales+streaming figures based on certification alone.

== Release history ==
Region	Date	Format(s)	Label(s)	Ref.
United Kingdom	25 June 2001	12-inch vinyl; CD; cassette	Parlophone; EMI	
Europe	August 2001	12-inch vinyl; CD	Parlophone; EMI	
Australia	24 September 2001	Maxi-CD	Parlophone; EMI	
United States	11 January 2002	Contemporary hit radio	Virgin America	
