= Clint Eastwood (song) =

2001 single by Gorillaz

- Cover used for the UK, Europe, and some US single release.

Single by Gorillaz

from the album Gorillaz
- B-side: "Dracula"
- Released: 5 March 2001
- Studio: Studio 13 (London, England); Geejam (Jamaica); The Glue Factory (San Francisco, California)
- Genre: Trip hop; alternative hip-hop; alternative rock; rap rock
- Length: 5:41 (album version); 5:55 (original mix); 3:45 (original mix edit)
- Label: Parlophone; Virgin
- Songwriters: Damon Albarn; Teren Jones
- Producers: Gorillaz; Dan the Automator; Jason Cox; Tom Girling

Gorillaz singles chronology
"Clint Eastwood" (2001)	"19-2000" (2001)

Del the Funky Homosapien singles chronology
"If You Must" (2000)	"Clint Eastwood" (2001)	"Rock the House" (2001)

Alternative cover
- Artwork used for the US CD release.

Music video
- "Clint Eastwood" on YouTube

"Clint Eastwood" is a song by English virtual band Gorillaz, released as their debut single and the lead single from their self-titled debut album on 5 March 2001. The song is named after the actor Clint Eastwood due to its similarity to the theme music of the film The Good, the Bad and the Ugly. The song is a mix of electronic music, dub, hip-hop and rock. The verses are rapped by Del the Funky Homosapien, portrayed as a blue phantom in the video, while the chorus is sung by Damon Albarn (2-D in the video).

"Clint Eastwood" peaked at number four on the UK Singles Chart, reached number 57 on the US Billboard Hot 100, and entered the top 10 in nine other countries, including Italy, where it peaked at number one. The single sold 1,200,000 copies in the UK and was certified double Platinum by the British Phonographic Industry (BPI). Rolling Stone ranked it at number 38 on its list of the "100 Best Songs of the 2000s". In October 2011, NME placed it at number 141 on its list of the "150 Best Tracks of the Past 15 Years". The magazine also ranked it number 347 on their list of "The 500 Greatest Songs of All Time". In 2021, Double J ranked it as the 14th-best debut single.

== Recording ==
Demo versions of "Clint Eastwood" were originally recorded by Damon Albarn on a four-track using a drum machine and guitar. A re-recording similar to these demos was recorded into Logic for use as a backing track. According to engineer, Jason Cox, "Damon gave us the OK to set fire to it on stage, but we said 'No, you can't set fire to that! It's a classic!'", and it ended up being used on the song as well as some other tracks on the album. The drums are provided by a drum machine. Multiple keyboards were used including the Moog Rogue and Roland JV for bass parts, a piano, and the Solina String Ensemble for string sounds. The main instrument used in the song is the melodica, which Albarn used to make the basic track as well. The instrumental beat originated from the first preset of the Omnichord, an electronic instrument.

Rapper Del the Funky Homosapien was brought onto the track at the last minute. The rap verses had originally been recorded by British group Phi Life Cypher, but producer Dan the Automator asked Del to quickly record his own verses for the song during a recording session for the 2000 album Deltron 3030 which he was recording with Del and the group Deltron 3030 at the same time. Del then wrote and recorded his verses in 30 minutes, utilizing the book How to Write a Hit Song gifted to him by his mother. Del later said that he was completely unaware of the song's release on the album Gorillaz and its success until people he personally knew began telling him that it was being played all over the radio.

Of the song's title, Albarn explained during a Reddit Ask Me Anything: "We were recording in Jamaica and listening to a lot of dancehall music and we imagined a cool moniker to have would be Clint Eastwood. Also I'm a great fan of the actor and of Sergio Leone and Ennio Morricone".

== Alternative versions ==
=== Studio versions ===
Some of the single releases featured an alternative version of the song which featured British hip hop group Phi Life Cypher, who also feature on the group's B-side "The Sounder". This was the original version.

=== Live versions ===
For some live performances of the song, alternative rappers are used. At the Brit Awards 2002, the original version was performed, with Phi Life Cypher. For the 2005 Demon Detour Live shows, a version of the song featuring De La Soul, who have also appeared on "Feel Good Inc." and "Superfast Jellyfish", and Bootie Brown, who has also appeared on "Dirty Harry", was written and recorded. This version was released on the CD single of "Dare". During the Escape to Plastic Beach Tour, a third version of the track, featuring British rapper Tinie Tempah, was written and performed. During July 2010, when Tempah was unable to make tour performances, a fourth version of the song, featuring Tempah's verses performed by British grime MCs Kano and Bashy, was devised. Kano used verses from his song 'Bassment', which was originally recorded for Plastic Beach. Snoop Dogg also performed a rap during the group's 2010 Glastonbury performance. During the group's Asian tour dates, a fifth version of the song, featuring verses from his song with Damon Albarn, 'Alarm Chord' from Lebanese-Syrian rapper Eslam Jawaad, was performed.

During Gorillaz co-creator Damon Albarn's 2014 solo tour for Everyday Robots, he performed the song live with Dan the Automator and Del the Funky Homosapien for the first time. Later in the tour, he played the song with new guest rappers like Vic Mensa, while also bringing back rappers who have previously performed the song with Gorillaz like Bashy and Snoop Dogg.

Since Gorillaz' return in 2017, other rappers have performed the track, such as Little Simz and Vince Staples, with others like Kano and Del returning at select shows.

Argentine rap star and freestyler Trueno performed the song alongside Gorillaz at Quilmes Rock in 2022. Later that same year, American rapper Freddie Gibbs made a guest appearance onstage with Gorillaz where he performed his verse from "Thuggin'" off his 2014 album Piñata. On 7 March 2026, Gorillaz performed the song on ''Saturday Night Live'', marking the band's first appearance on the program; Del the Funky Homosapien returned for this performance.

== Reception ==
"Clint Eastwood" received widespread acclaim from critics, who praised the catchiness and the blend of hip-hop with alternative rock. Alex Needham of NME praised the Ed Case Remix, stating that it "hauls [the track] down the dancefloor of Twice As Nice, where all the disparate elements fall into place and the jarring culture clash suddenly makes perfect sense. A little shift in perspective and, suddenly, you've got a West London Basement Jaxx, embodying a more interesting – and accurate – vision of England than anything Blur (Albarn's other project) have dared to attempt."

In 2001, Jamie Hewlett and Albarn indicated that they had not received any feedback from Clint Eastwood himself over the song. Albarn expressed a desire to send the actor some of the band's merchandise as a mark of respect, and said, "I'm sure Clint Eastwood would like [the song]. He's an intelligent man."

== Music video ==
The animated music video was directed by Jamie Hewlett and Pete Candeland. It starts with the Gorillaz logo in red against a black screen, and the following quote from the 1978 film Dawn of the Dead: "Every dead body that is not exterminated, gets up and kills. The people it kills, get up and kill" in Japanese then in English. This phrase was deemed offensive in some countries and a censored version was produced that omits this intro. The video and song name is a reference to the famous Western starring actor Clint Eastwood, The Good, the Bad and the Ugly. An interpolation of the yell from the film's theme song, in particular that film's protagonist Tuco Ramirez (Eli Wallach)'s leitmotif, can be heard at the beginning of the video, followed by sinister laughter from Murdoc Niccals. The notes that the melodica plays are also based on the yell.

The band is seen playing their music against a completely white backdrop. 2-D is seen wearing a T-Virus shirt most likely referencing Resident Evil. Russel Hobbs' cap then begins to mysteriously rise on its own, and the ghost of Del appears to be emerging from under it. He begins to rap, leaving the other band members dumbfounded, and the backdrop slowly develops dark clouds in the sky. Enormous tombstones start to burst out of the ground, and the scene becomes that of a cemetery, as a shower of rain and thunderstorm begins. Shortly afterwards, zombie gorilla hands rise up from the ground. Murdoc is grabbed by the crotch and pulled to the ground, a reference to the Peter Jackson zombie film Braindead. Seconds later, the zombie gorillas themselves rise up. Murdoc immediately flees at the sight of them, with a number of them pursuing him. He then turns and glares at them out of frustration at his inability to escape, and the zombie apes engage in a bizarre dance routine before Murdoc is knocked back by a lightning bolt; this dance routine is similar to the choreography of Michael Jackson's music video "Thriller".

Noodle is then shown joyfully skipping along, almost as if she is completely unaware of her surroundings, and in her playful skipping, she delivers a hard kick to one of the zombie gorillas in the face. Immediately afterwards, Del is then sucked back into Russel's head as the gorillas all disintegrate, and the band members are left standing in the cemetery, now bright with sunlight. The video then concludes with a split screen showing each of the four band members and their names. The video has a running time of 4:32, which is significantly different from the album version, which runs for approximately 5:42, however, the album version features about 1:10 of the backing track playing with no vocals over the top. The BPM of the music video is also slightly slower than that of the album version, and the music video version has an ending after the last time "My future" is sung, whilst the album version fades out at the end.

The video for "Clint Eastwood" won an award at the Rushes Soho Short Film Festival Awards in 2001, defeating entries by Blur, Fatboy Slim, Radiohead and Robbie Williams.

== Track listings ==
- Benelux and French two-track CD single
1. "Clint Eastwood" – 5:54
2. "Dracula" – 4:41
- Australian, European and UK CD maxi-single
1. "Clint Eastwood" – 5:55
2. "Clint Eastwood" (Ed Case Refix edit) featuring Sweetie Irie – 3:41
3. "Dracula" – 4:41
4. "Clint Eastwood" (video) – 4:33
- Italian and UK 12-inch vinyl

A1. "Clint Eastwood" – 5:55
B1. "Clint Eastwood" (Ed Case Refix) featuring Sweetie Irie – 4:28
B2. "Clint Eastwood" (Phi Life Cypher version) – 4:52

- UK cassette single
1. "Clint Eastwood" – 5:41
2. "Clint Eastwood" (Ed Case Refix edit) featuring Sweetie Irie – 3:41
3. "Dracula" – 4:41

== Personnel ==
Personnel are adapted from the liner notes and Tidal.

- Damon Albarn (credited as Gorillaz) – vocals, all instruments, production
- Del tha Funky Homosapien – rap
- Kid Koala – turntables
- Dan the Automator – production
- Tom Girling – co-production, engineering, Pro Tools
- Jason Cox – co-production, engineering
- Toby Whelan – engineering assistance
- Tim Burrell – mastering engineer

== Charts ==
=== Weekly charts ===
Chart (2001)	Peak position
Australia (ARIA)	17
Austria (Ö3 Austria Top 40)	2
Belgium (Ultratop 50 Flanders)	21
Belgium (Ultratop 50 Wallonia)	11
Denmark (Tracklisten)	16
Europe (Eurochart Hot 100)	5
France (SNEP)	17
Germany (GfK)	2
Greece (IFPI)	10
Ireland (IRMA)	5
Ireland Dance (IRMA)	1
Italy (FIMI)	1
Netherlands (Dutch Top 40)	27
Netherlands (Single Top 100)	26
New Zealand (Recorded Music NZ)	12
Norway (VG-lista)	13
Polish Airplay Top 100 (ZPAV)	4
Portugal (AFP)	4
Scottish Singles Sales (Official Charts)	4
Sweden (Sverigetopplistan)	7
Switzerland (Schweizer Hitparade)	3
UK Singles (Official Charts)	4
US Billboard Hot 100	57
US Alternative Airplay (Billboard)	3
US Pop Airplay (Billboard)	32

Chart (2025)	Peak position
US Hot Rock & Alternative Songs (Billboard)	20

=== Year-end charts ===
Chart (2001)	Position
Australia (ARIA)	74
Austria (Ö3 Austria Top 40)	15
Belgium (Ultratop 50 Wallonia)	45
Brazil (Crowley)	74
Europe (Eurochart Hot 100)	16
France (SNEP)	47
Germany (Media Control)	14
Ireland (IRMA)	32
Sweden (Hitlistan)	42
Switzerland (Schweizer Hitparade)	18
UK Singles (OCC)	12
US Modern Rock Tracks (Billboard)	21

=== Decade-end charts ===
Chart (2000–2009)	Position
UK Top 100 Songs of the Decade	96

== Certifications and sales ==
Region	Certification	Certified units/sales
Australia (ARIA)	Gold	35,000^{^}
Austria (IFPI Austria)	Gold	20,000^{*}
Canada (Music Canada)	3× Platinum	240,000^{‡}
Denmark (IFPI Danmark)	Gold	45,000^{‡}
France (SNEP)	Gold	250,000^{*}
Germany (BVMI)	Gold	250,000^{^}
Italy (FIMI) sales since 2009	Gold	25,000^{‡}
New Zealand (RMNZ)	3× Platinum	90,000^{‡}
Sweden (GLF)	Gold	15,000^{^}
Spain (Promusicae)	Gold	30,000^{‡}
Switzerland (IFPI Switzerland)	Gold	20,000^{^}
United Kingdom (BPI)	2× Platinum	1,200,000^{‡}
United States	—	1,228,344
^{*} Sales figures based on certification alone.^{^} Shipments figures based on certification alone.^{‡} Sales+streaming figures based on certification alone.

== Release history ==
Region	Date	Format(s)	Label(s)	Ref(s).
United Kingdom	5 March 2001	12-inch vinyl; CD; cassette	Parlophone	
Australia	7 May 2001	CD	EMI	
United States	29 May 2001	Alternative radio	Virgin	
United States	30 July 2001	Contemporary hit radio	Virgin	

== See also ==
- List of number-one hits of 2001 (Italy)
