= The Singles Collection 2001–2011 =

2011 compilation album by Gorillaz

Compilation album by Gorillaz
- Released: 28 November 2011
- Recorded: 1998–2010
- Genres: Trip hop; alternative rock
- Length: 56:10
- Label: Parlophone
- Producer: Gorillaz

Gorillaz album chronology
The Fall (2010)	The Singles Collection 2001–2011 (2011)	Humanz (2017)

Damon Albarn chronology
Kinshasa One Two (2011)	The Singles Collection 2001–2011 (2011)	Rocket Juice & the Moon (2012)

Singles from The Singles Collection 2001–2011
- 1. "Doncamatic" Released: 21 November 2010

The Singles Collection 2001–2011 is a compilation album released by British virtual band Gorillaz on 28 November 2011. The album is a collection of the group's singles released between 2001 and 2011, except The Fall. The album is available in four different editions: standard, deluxe, 12" vinyl and 7" single box set.

== Critical reception ==
Professional ratings
Aggregate scores
Source	Rating
Metacritic	76/100
Review scores
Source	Rating
AllMusic	4/5 stars
The Boston Phoenix	3/4 stars
Clash	7/10
Drowned in Sound	6/10
MSN Music (Expert Witness)	A−
Pitchfork	7.9/10
Q	4/5 stars
Rolling Stone	3.5/5 stars
Uncut	4/5 stars
Under the Radar	8/10

According to the review aggregator Metacritic, The Singles Collection 2001–2011 received "generally favorable reviews" based on a weighted average score of 76 out of 100 from 13 critic scores.

== Track listing ==
No.	Title	Originally appears on	Length
1.	"Tomorrow Comes Today"	Gorillaz	3:13
2.	"Clint Eastwood" (featuring Del the Funky Homosapien)	Gorillaz	5:42
3.	"19-2000"	Gorillaz	3:27
4.	"Rock the House" (featuring Del the Funky Homosapien)	Gorillaz	4:09
5.	"Feel Good Inc." (single edit) (featuring De La Soul)	Demon Days	3:42
6.	"Dare" (single edit) (featuring Shaun Ryder)	Demon Days	3:33
7.	"Dirty Harry" (single edit) (featuring Bootie Brown and San Fernando Valley Youth Chorus)	Demon Days	3:50
8.	"Kids with Guns" (featuring Neneh Cherry)	Demon Days	3:46
9.	"El Mañana"	Demon Days	3:51
10.	"Stylo" (radio edit) (featuring Bobby Womack and Mos Def)	Plastic Beach	3:53
11.	"Superfast Jellyfish" (edit) (featuring De La Soul and Gruff Rhys)	Plastic Beach	2:58
12.	"On Melancholy Hill" (radio edit)	Plastic Beach	3:28
13.	"Doncamatic" (featuring Daley)	Single release only	3:20
14.	"Clint Eastwood" (Ed Case/Sweetie Irie Refix) (edit)	B-side to Clint Eastwood single	3:41
15.	"19-2000" (Soulchild remix)	B-side to 19-2000 single	3:29
Total length:			56:10

Japanese edition bonus tracks
No.	Title	Originally appears on	Length
16.	"Feel Good Inc." (Noodle's Demo)	B-side to Feel Good Inc. single	2:49
17.	"Stylo" (Labrinth SNES Remix)	B-side to Stylo single	4:11
Total length:			63:05

== Song origins ==
- "Tomorrow Comes Today", "Clint Eastwood", "19-2000" and "Rock the House", and also the remixes of "Clint Eastwood" and "19-2000" are from Gorillaz (2001)
- "Feel Good Inc.", "Dare", "Dirty Harry", "Kids with Guns" and "El Mañana" are from Demon Days (2005)
- "Stylo", "Superfast Jellyfish" and "On Melancholy Hill" are from Plastic Beach (2010)
- "Doncamatic" is a non-album single.

== Charts ==
=== Weekly charts ===
Chart (2011–2025)	Peak position
Australian Albums (ARIA)	85
Belgian Albums (Ultratop Flanders)	54
Belgian Albums (Ultratop Wallonia)	70
Canadian Albums (Billboard)	161
French Albums (SNEP)	111
Greek Albums (IFPI Greece)	20
Irish Albums (IRMA)	21
Italian Albums (FIMI)	75
Japanese Albums (Oricon)	44
Mexican Albums (Top 100 Mexico)	39
New Zealand Albums (RMNZ)	32
Portuguese Albums (AFP)	23
Scottish Albums (Official Charts)	58
Spanish Albums (Promusicae)	38
UK Albums (Official Charts)	42
US Top Alternative Albums (Billboard)	25
US Top Current Album Sales (Billboard)	176
US Top Rock Albums (Billboard)	37
US Indie Store Album Sales (Billboard)	20
US Vinyl Albums (Billboard)	8

=== Year-end charts ===
Chart (2015)	Position
Australian Hip Hop/R&B Albums (ARIA)	69

Chart (2016)	Position
Australian Hip Hop/R&B Albums (ARIA)	66

Chart (2017)	Position
Australian Hip Hop/R&B Albums (ARIA)	77

Chart (2018)	Position
Australian Hip Hop/R&B Albums (ARIA)	97
Mexican Albums (Top 100 Mexico)	99

== Certifications ==
Region	Certification	Certified units/sales
New Zealand (RMNZ)	Gold	7,500^{‡}
Poland (ZPAV)	Gold	10,000^{‡}
United Kingdom (BPI)	Platinum	300,000^{^}
^{^} Shipments figures based on certification alone.^{‡} Sales+streaming figures based on certification alone.
