= ITunes Session (Gorillaz EP) =

2010 EP by Gorillaz

iTunes Session

EP by Gorillaz
- Released: 22 October 2010
- Genres: Alternative rock; hip hop
- Length: 1:09:05
- Labels: Parlophone; Virgin

Gorillaz chronology
Plastic Beach (2010)	iTunes Session (2010)	The Fall (2010)

iTunes Session is a live EP by the British virtual band Gorillaz that was released exclusively through iTunes on 22 October 2010.

== Track listing ==
No.	Title	Length
1.	"Clint Eastwood"	4:32
2.	"Dirty Harry"	3:48
3.	"Feel Good Inc."	3:37
4.	"Kids With Guns"	3:47
5.	"Stylo"	4:32
6.	"Glitter Freeze"	4:04
7.	"On Melancholy Hill"	3:47
8.	"Rhinestone Eyes"	3:22
9.	"iTunes Interview"	37:36
Total length:		1:09:05

== Charts ==
Chart performance for iTunes Session
Chart (2010)	Peak position
US Billboard 200	154
US Digital Albums (Billboard)	25
