= Gorillaz World Tour 2022 =

World Tour 2022
- Tour by Gorillaz
- Promotional poster for the Australian dates
- Location: Europe; Latin America; North America; Oceania
- Start date: 28 April 2022
- End date: 23 October 2022
- Legs: 6
- No. of shows: 55
- Supporting acts: Barney Artist; Deki Alem; EarthGang; Jungle; Los Petit Fellas; Lous and the Yakuza; Moonchild Sanelly; Mr Jukes; Nathy Peluso; Toy Selectah; Zeballos

Gorillaz concert chronology
- Song Machine Tour (2021); World Tour 2022 (2022); The Mountain Tour (2026–2027)

The World Tour 2022 was a concert tour by the British alternative rock virtual band Gorillaz.

== Set list ==
The following set list is obtained from the concert held at the Primavera 0 Festival in Montevideo, Uruguay, on 28 April 2022. It is not a representation of all shows on the tour.

1. "M1 A1"
2. "Strange Timez"
3. "Last Living Souls"
4. "Tranz"
5. "Aries"
6. "Tomorrow Comes Today"
7. "Rhinestone Eyes"
8. "19-2000"
9. "Glitter Freeze"
10. "Cracker Island"
11. "O Green World"
12. "On Melancholy Hill"
13. "Pirate Jet"
14. "El Mañana"
15. "Silent Running"
16. "Andromeda"
17. "Rockit"
18. "Dirty Harry" (featuring Bootie Brown)
19. "Superfast Jellyfish" (featuring Posdnuos)
20. "Feel Good Inc." (featuring Posdnuos)
21. "Momentary Bliss"
22. "Plastic Beach"
  Encore
23. "The Tower of Montevideo" (Damon Albarn song)
24. "Stylo" (featuring Bootie Brown)
25. "Kids With Guns"
26. "Clint Eastwood" (featuring Sweetie Irie)
27. "Don't Get Lost in Heaven"
28. "Demon Days"

== Tour dates ==
List of 2022 concerts
Date (2022)	City	Country	Venue
28 April (Note: The show on 28 April 2022 in Montevideo was part of the Primavera 0 Festival.)	Montevideo	Uruguay	Antel Arena
30 April (Note: The show on 30 April 2022 in Buenos Aires was part of the Quilmes Rock Festival.)	Buenos Aires	Argentina	Tecnópolis
3 May	Santiago	Chile	Movistar Arena
7 May (Note: The show on 7 May 2022 in Querétaro City was part of the Pulso GNP Festival.)	Querétaro City	Mexico	Antiguo Aeropuerto de Querétaro
9 May	Monterrey	Mexico	Auditorio Citibanamex
12 May	Bogotá	Colombia	Movistar Arena
15 May (Note: The shows on 15 May 2022 in São Paulo and 21 May 2022 in Rio de Janeiro were part of the MITA Festival.)	São Paulo	Brazil	Spark Arena
18 May	Curitiba	Brazil	Pedreira Paulo Leminski
21 May	Rio de Janeiro	Brazil	Jockey Club Brasileiro
2 June (Note: The show on 2 June 2022 in Paris was part of the We Love Green Festival.)	Paris	France	Bois de Vincennes
4 June (Note: The shows on 4 and 9 June 2017 in Barcelona were part of the Primavera Sound Festival.)	Barcelona	Spain	Parc del Fòrum
9 June	Barcelona	Spain	Parc del Fòrum
11 June (Note: The show on 11 June 2022 in Porto was part of the NOS Primavera Sound Festival.)	Porto	Portugal	Parque da Cidade
15 June	Vienne	France	Théâtre Antique de Vienne
17 June (Note: The show on 17 June 2022 in Nîmes was part of the Nimes Festival.)	Nîmes	France	Arènes de Nîmes
19 June (Note: The show on 19 June 2022 in Werchter was part of the Werchter Boutique Festival.)	Werchter	Belgium	Werchterpark
22 June	Cologne	Germany	Palladium
24 June	Berlin	Germany	Parkbühne Wuhlheide
26 June	Esch-sur-Alzette	Luxembourg	Rockhal
2 July (Note: The show on 2 July 2022 in Nijmegen was part of the Down The Rabbit Hole Festival.)	Nijmegen	Netherlands	Groene Heuvels
5 July	Verona	Italy	Arena di Verona
16 July (Note: The show on 16 July 2022 in Cluj-Napoca was part of the Electric Castle Festival.)	Cluj-Napoca	Romania	Banffy Castle
24 July	Melbourne	Australia	John Cain Arena
26 July	Sydney	Australia	Qudos Bank Arena
28 July (Note: The show on 28 July 2022 in Adelaide was part of the Illuminate Adelaide Festival.)	Adelaide	Australia	Adelaide Entertainment Centre
4 August	Stockholm	Sweden	Skansen
6 August (Note: The show on 6 August 2022 in Skanderborg was part of the Smukfest.)	Skanderborg	Denmark	Bøgescenerne
10 August (Note: The show on 10 August 2022 in Oslo was part of the Øyafestivalen.)	Oslo	Norway	Tøyen Park
12 August (Note: The show on 12 August 2022 in Helsinki was part of the Flow Festival.)	Helsinki	Finland	Suvilahti
17 August	Dublin	Ireland	3Arena
19 August (Note: The show on 19 August 2022 in London was part of the All Points East Festival.)	London	England	Victoria Park
11 September	Vancouver	Canada	Rogers Arena
12 September	Seattle	United States	Climate Pledge Arena
14 September	Portland	United States	Moda Center
17 September (Note: The show on 17 September 2022 in Las Vegas was part of the Life Is Beautiful Music & Art Festival.)	Las Vegas	United States	Downtown Las Vegas
19 September	Salt Lake City	United States	Vivint Arena
21 September	San Francisco	United States	Chase Center
23 September	Inglewood (Note: Labeled as Los Angeles in promotional material)	United States	Kia Forum
25 September	Inglewood	United States	YouTube Theater
26 September	Phoenix	United States	Footprint Center
28 September	Denver	United States	Ball Arena
30 September	Austin	United States	Moody Center
1 October	Irving (Note: Labeled as Dallas in promotional material)	United States	The Pavilion at Toyota Music Factory
3 October	Chicago	United States	United Center
5 October	Detroit	United States	Little Caesars Arena
6 October	Toronto	Canada	Scotiabank Arena
8 October	Montreal	Canada	Bell Centre
11 October	Boston	United States	TD Garden
12 October	Brooklyn	United States	Barclays Center
14 October	Philadelphia	United States	The Met Philadelphia
15 October	Philadelphia	United States	The Met Philadelphia
17 October	Columbia	United States	Merriweather Post Pavilion
19 October	Alpharetta (Note: Labeled as Atlanta in promotional material)	United States	Ameris Bank Amphitheatre
21 October	Orlando	United States	Amway Center
23 October	Miami	United States	FTX Arena

=== Cancelled dates ===
List of cancelled concerts
Date (2022)	City	Country	Venue	Reason
8 July (Note: The show on 8 July 2022 in Moscow would be part of the Park Live Festival.)	Moscow	Russia	Gorky Park	Russian invasion of Ukraine
10 July (Note: The show on 10 July 2022 in Kyiv would be part of the UPark Festival.)	Kyiv	Ukraine	Sky Family Park	Russian invasion of Ukraine
22 July (Note: The show on 22 July 2022 in Byron Bay would be part of the Splendour in the Grass Festival.)	Byron Bay	Australia	North Byron Parklands	Cancelled due to bad weather

== Live band ==
- Damon Albarn – lead vocals, keyboards, piano, acoustic guitar, electric guitar, melodica, keytar
- Mike Smith – keyboards, backing vocals
- Jeff Wootton – lead guitar
- Seye Adelekan – bass guitar, acoustic guitar, backing vocals
- Femi Koleoso – drums, percussion
- Jesse Hackett – keyboards (select dates only)
- Remi Kabaka Jr. – percussion (select dates only)
- Karl Vanden Bossche – drums, percussion
- Angel Silvera – backing vocals
- Petra Luke – backing vocals, vocals on "Dare"
- Rebecca Freckleton – backing vocals, vocals on "Dare"
- Michelle Ndegwa – backing vocals, vocals on "Kids with Guns"
- Matthew Allen – backing vocals
- J Appiah – backing vocals (select dates only)
- Marcus Anthony – backing vocals (select dates only)

=== Guest collaborators and additional musicians ===
- Bootie Brown – rap on "Dirty Harry", "Stylo" and "New Gold"
- Sweetie Irie – rap on "Clint Eastwood"
- De La Soul – rap on "Superfast Jellyfish" and "Feel Good Inc." (Select dates only) (Note: Most part of the tour, Posdnuos was the only De La Soul member who joined Gorillaz, while Trugoy joined the band at some shows and Maseo didn't join the tour.)
- Del the Funky Homosapien – rap on "Clint Eastwood" and "Rock the House" (Select dates only)
- Hypnotic Brass Ensemble – brass on "Broken", "Sweepstakes", "Plastic Beach" and "With Love to an Ex" (Select dates only)
- Moonchild Sanelly – vocals on "With Love to an Ex" (Select dates only)
- EarthGang – rap on "Opium" (Select dates only)
- Mos Def – rap on "Stylo" (Barcelona and London shows only)
- Beck – vocals on "The Valley of the Pagans" and "Possession Island" (Porto and Inglewood shows only)
- Kevin Parker - vocals on "New Gold" (London and first Inglewood shows)
- Thundercat - vocals and bass on "Cracker Island" (First Inglewood and New York City shows)
- Little Simz – rap on "Garage Palace" (Porto only)
- Freddie Gibbs – rap on "Clint Eastwood" (Helsinki only)
- Popcaan – rap on "Saturnz Barz" (London only)
- Shaun Ryder – vocals on "Dare" (London only)
- Rowetta – vocals on "Dare" (London only)
- Paul Simonon – guitar on "Plastic Beach" (London only)
- Peven Everett – vocals on "Strobelite" and "Stylo" (Chicago only)
