= The Bravest Man in the Universe =

Studio album by Bobby Womack
- Released: June 11, 2012
- Studio: London, England; New York, US
- Genre: R&B; soul; neo soul; electronica; trip hop
- Length: 37:12
- Label: XL
- Producer: Damon Albarn; Kwes; Harold Payne; Richard Russell

Bobby Womack chronology
Christmas Album (2000)	The Bravest Man in the Universe (2012)

Singles from The Bravest Man in the Universe
- 1. "Please Forgive My Heart" Released: March 8, 2012

The Bravest Man in the Universe is the twenty-seventh and final studio album by the American soul artist Bobby Womack. Released on June 12, 2012, it was his first studio album since 2000 and his first album of original material since 1994's Resurrection. It was produced by Damon Albarn and Richard Russell and released on the UK-based XL Recordings label. The Bravest Man in the Universe is the final album to be released in Womack's lifetime, as The Best Is Yet to Come will be released posthumously.

Recording took place between October 3 and December 2, 2011, in London and New York studios, followed by a brief recording session in London on March 7, 2012. In the period between December and March recordings, Womack was admitted to hospital with pneumonia. In the period between the last recording session and the album's release he was diagnosed with colon cancer and successfully treated through surgery. The first song released from the album, "Please Forgive My Heart", was offered as a free download on XL Recordings's official website on March 8, 2012.

The album entered the charts at number 49 in the UK and number 181 in the US.

The album was listed at No. 36 on Rolling Stone's list of the top 50 albums of 2012. It was the winner of the UK's Q Award for Best Album of 2012, announced on October 22, 2012.

== Background ==
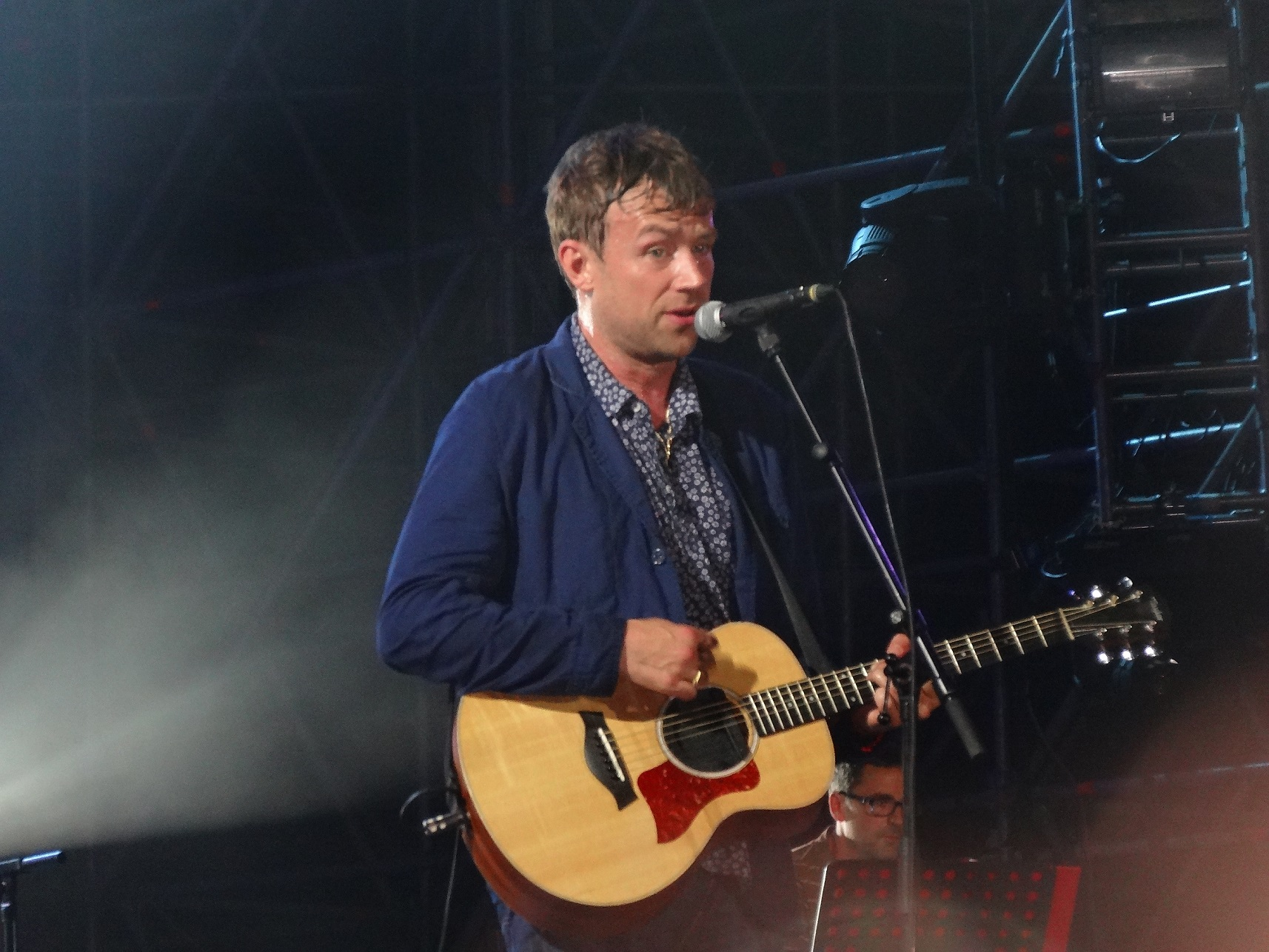
Damon Albarn, the album's co-producer, in 2013

The Bravest Man in the Universe is Womack's first studio album since 2000's Christmas Album and his first album of original material since 1994's Resurrection. "I'd just come off a heavy drugs scene and I'd been out 20 years", claimed Womack. "I stopped wanting to be a part of music when the Monkees retired." Womack explained that he had lost much of his desire and confidence to create music. Womack's daughter, GinaRe revealed that "there was a point in my dad's life when he didn't even want to write and make music. When I was younger he would, like, drink his tequila and play his guitar and think of new songs 24 hours a day, and then there came a point when he quit everything... He'd just watch TV and be in bed by 10pm every night; he had no passion for the music anymore." In 2009, Albarn contacted Womack during the recording sessions for the Gorillaz album, Plastic Beach. Albarn wanted to work with Womack due to him loving Womack's voice, comparing it to the voices of Curtis Mayfield and Marvin Gaye. GinaRe convinced him to collaborate with Gorillaz, stating that it would be a good way to return to music. Womack ended up singing on the tracks "Stylo" and "Cloud of Unknowing" and participated in their Escape to Plastic Beach Tour.

Womack became inspired to start writing music again, stating that "one day I was riding on the bus and I told my assistant to tell the driver to pull over and get my guitar and bring a pad and I wrote about 20 songs. My thoughts were running crazy. I was like, 'Thank God, that's the feeling I wanted back.'" Albarn approached Richard Russell about working on Womack's new album. The pair had recently worked together on Kinshasa One Two as part of DRC Music and Albarn had also contributed to Gil Scott-Heron's I'm New Here, which Russell had produced. "I had a gut feeling about the project", claimed Russell. "Firstly because Bobby's spirit is so strong. It's present in that incredible voice of his. I also know Damon is a do-er, he gets things done."

== Recording ==
Working in the studio was a total joy. It was a small team, with Bobby on guitar, Damon on keyboard and other instruments, myself on Drums and Samples and Harold Payne, who has worked with Bobby since the 1970s. It was open and free, with no egos involved... everyone was surprised how easy it was, really.

— Richard Russell

"This album was put together like we had worked on it for years", claimed Womack. "But we had only worked on it from the time we went in the studio. We just went in and said, 'Let's do a song.' And the songs kept on coming. We'd go in the studio each morning at 11am, and at 6pm every night, everyone wanted to go home and be with their family. Damon was very strict about that, and I respected that, because that was how I wanted to be, and I was persuaded in the past that you gotta hang out all night..." Richard Russell claimed that "working in the studio was a total joy" and described the atmosphere in the studio as "open and free, with no egos involved... everyone was surprised how easy it was, really." Damon Albarn revealed that on many occasions, he would give instrumental demos to Womack who would take them away outside studio hours and use them as a basis for writing lyrics. Womack said that Albarn encouraged him to push the boundaries with experimentation, with Albarn claiming that "the structure and approach [to recording] was unorthodox for Womack." On March 15, 2013 iTunes re-released the album under the moniker "The Expanded Edition" which features three new songs, "It's Been a Long Night", "Hold the River Down" and "Central Avenue", all of which were produced by Richard Russell and Damon Albarn.

The title track actually dates back to Womack's early career in the 1960s and 1970s. He told Uncut magazine: "I wrote that over 40 years ago. Damon and Richard were shocked when I told them, but it's a case of 'same attitude, different times.' When you tell the truth you never go out of style."

== Music ==
Retox Magazine's reviewer Jack Flahavan described the album's sound as "a cocktail of the old school and the new, a meeting between tradition and futurism, poetically entwined to create a soundscape in a sphere of its own." Simon Harper of Clash magazine, described "Please Forgive My Heart" as containing "paralyzing pain" as Womack "pleads over sparse piano and penetrating, warm beats".

== Artwork ==
The album cover, photographed by Jamie-James Medina, features Womack's hand with his thumb twisted backward, a capability of some double-jointed individuals. At Consequence of Sound, the reviewer Jon Hadusek writes, "What’s wrong with his thumb? On the cover—why is [it] like that? Is it broken? ... things are grey. Never has artwork so aptly prefaced the album it accompanies."

== Reception ==
Professional ratings
Aggregate scores
Source	Rating
AnyDecentMusic?	7.6/10
Metacritic	80/100
Review scores
Source	Rating
AllMusic	4.5/5 stars
Chicago Tribune	3/5 stars
Clash	8/10
Consequence of Sound	B
The Guardian	4/5 stars
NME	3.5/5 stars
Pitchfork	6.2/10
PopMatters	7/10
Rolling Stone	3.5/5 stars
Uncut	7/10

The Bravest Man in the Universe received positive reviews from most contemporary music critics. At Metacritic, which assigns a normalized rating out of 100 to reviews from mainstream critics, the album received an average score of 80 based on 34 reviews, equating to a tag of "generally favorable reviews". Matthew Bennett of Clash described the album as "a beautiful snapshot in time" and "completely beguiling", stating that it "serves up history on a plate for us to devour. You can feel the forces of time fall into formation as foreign auras rub in electric friction and the resultant sparks ignite a new musical canvas." Neil McCormick of The Telegraph wrote that "there have been a lot of attempts to drag soul music into the future but it rarely works as brilliantly (if crazily) as this." McCormick also claimed that "[Womack] doesn't just sound like the bravest man in the universe, but the maddest and baddest, roaring defiance and muttering regrets from a life lived on the edges, while synthetic life forms and plastic beats fizz and warp around him." Nate Knaebel of Dusted Magazine described Womack's vocals as "wonderfully rough" and as "heart-wrenching as ever", and stated that "given his recent scrap with cancer, we should be thankful." The Wire wrote that "the gift that this record has offered him is the gift of being who he is once again."

Albarn and Russell's production received a mixed reception. Steve Shaw of Fact magazine claimed that Womack's vocals "do not always get the right level of support" and that "a scatter-shot level of inconsistency throughout the record tending to rob songs of their enjoyability." Knaebel wrote that "the production here simply gets in the way. It intrudes on the songwriting, distracts the listener, and interferes with what are otherwise solid and sometimes deeply moving performances. Womack is the main event, and though Albarn and Russell are most likely more than respectful of this reality, they just don't deliver." David Dacks of Exclaim! stated that in, what he perceived as "Russell's second attempt at re-contextualizing a grizzled African-American musical icon, the concept doesn't fare quite as well" as it does on I'm New Here. Ryan Dombal, in a review for Pitchfork, wrote that "the album's tightly wound drums and repetitive rigidness [often] undo Womack's spontaneity, forcing him into an unsuitably cloistered space" and claimed that the album "rarely hits a similar [intimate] feeling [to his back catalogue], and while Womack does his best to step up to his alien surroundings, he can't help but sound like an out-of-place guest on his own album." Dombal however also stated that "the pairing pays off surprisingly well" on "Please Forgive My Heart" and "Whatever Happened to the Times". Dan Martin, writing for the NME claimed that "the only problem is that at times, it feels like all parties are a little intimidated by each other, stopping just short of going the whole way with the primal force that the best moments prove Womack is still capable of."

Some reviewers, however, were more positive about the production. Uncut described the results of "setting Womack's distinctive voice against stark electro backings and thunderous beats" as "startling". Kevin Ritchie of Now claimed that "it's eminently clear these producers know exactly when to assert themselves and when to stay out of the soul legend's way to achieve the most captivating results possible" and that the album "fearlessly fuses the old – grizzled gospel and swampy blues – with new twitchy, thumping electronics to create something that's both inspiringly original and comfortingly familiar. It's a dynamic reminiscent of Jack White's brilliant team-up with country icon Loretta Lynn a few years back." Jon Dolan of Rolling Stone said that Womack sounds "at home testifying over coolly throbbing beats" and praised the album as "a classic sentiment updated for the era of drone attacks and wiretaps."

== Accolades ==
The Bravest Man in the Universe topped Clash's list of the top 40 albums of 2012, being described by the publication as "an album that crowns his career, that bridges generations, genres and technologies, and one that nearly killed him." The album was listed at number 36 on Rolling Stone's year-end list, with the album being described as a "deeply soulful, startlingly modern R&B set. Like Russell's 2010 collaboration with Gil Scott-Heron, Bravest Man is mainly about magnified vocal grain and electronic rhythms." The Guardian ranked the album at number 10 in its year-end list, stating that despite the album being "only 37 minutes and 12 seconds long, it amounted to a career resurrection".

The album was the winner of the UK's Q Award for Best Album of 2012, announced on October 22, 2012.

== Track listing ==
All tracks composed by Bobby Womack, Damon Albarn, Harold Payne and Richard Russell; except where indicated

No.	Title	Writer(s)	Length
1.	"The Bravest Man in the Universe"		3:52
2.	"Please Forgive My Heart"		4:30
3.	"Deep River"	Traditional	1:49
4.	"Dayglo Reflection" (featuring Lana Del Rey)	Womack, Albarn, Payne, Russell, Sam Cooke, Elizabeth Grant	4:18
5.	"Whatever Happened to the Times"	Womack, Jim Ford	4:08
6.	"Stupid Introlude" (featuring Gil Scott-Heron)	Gil Scott-Heron	0:21
7.	"Stupid"		3:51
8.	"If There Wasn't Something There"		4:38
9.	"Love Is Gonna Lift You Up"		3:43
10.	"Nothin' Can Save Ya" (featuring Fatoumata Diawara)		3:47
11.	"Jubilee (Don't Let Nobody Turn You Around)"	Traditional	2:07

iTunes bonus track
No.	Title	Length
12.	"Please Forgive My Heart" (funk version)	4:59

iTunes expanded edition
No.	Title	Length
12.	"It's Been a Long Night"	3:36
13.	"Hold the River Down"	3:38
14.	"Central Avenue"	3:50
15.	"Please Forgive My Heart" (funk version)	4:59

Sample credits

- "Dayglo Reflection" contains a sample of an interview with Sam Cooke on American Bandstand and "Moonlight on Vermont" as written by Don Van Vliet and performed by Captain Beefheart & His Magic Band, from the album Trout Mask Replica.

== Personnel ==
- Damon Albarn – executive producer, backing vocals, piano, guitar, omnichord, additional production, drum machine, bass, composition, Korg M1, synthesizer, mixing, engineering
- Jason Cox – recording, engineering, mixing
- Fatoumata Diawara – guest vocals (track 10)
- Tom Girling – recording, engineering, mixing
- Gil Scott-Heron – guest vocals (sampled)
- Kwes – additional production (track 5)
- Lana Del Rey – guest vocals (track 4)
- Richard Russell – executive producer, drum programming, MIDI, drum machine, Akai MPC production, mixing, samples, Roland TR-909, engineer, various
- Stephen Sedgwick – recording, engineering, mixing
- Harold Payne – additional production
- Jessie Ware – backing vocals
- Bobby Womack – lead vocals, backing vocals, guitar, various

== Charts ==
Chart (2012)	Peak position
Austrian Albums (Ö3 Austria)	36
Belgian Albums (Ultratop Flanders)	28
Belgian Albums (Ultratop Wallonia)	48
Dutch Albums (Album Top 100)	79
French Albums (SNEP)	52
German Albums (Offizielle Top 100)	84
Swedish Albums (Sverigetopplistan)	35
Swiss Albums (Schweizer Hitparade)	32
UK Albums (OCC)	49
US Billboard 200	181
US Top Dance Albums (Billboard)	6
US Top R&B/Hip-Hop Albums (Billboard)	21
