= Please Forgive My Heart =

Single by Bobby Womack

from the album The Bravest Man in the Universe
- Released: 8 March 2012
- Recorded: 2011–2012
- Studio: Studio 13, London, UK; XL Recording, Ladbroke Grove, UK; Masterdisk, New York City, US
- Genre: R&B, soul, neo soul, electronica
- Length: 4:31
- Label: Parlophone, XL
- Songwriters: Damon Albarn, Bobby Womack
- Producers: Damon Albarn, Richard Russell & Bobby Womack

Bobby Womack singles chronology
"Stylo" (2010)	"Please Forgive My Heart" (2012)

"Please Forgive My Heart" is a single from American soul artist Bobby Womack for his album The Bravest Man in the Universe. Released on June 8, 2012, it was his first studio album since 2000 and his first album of original material since 1994's Resurrection. It was produced by Damon Albarn and Richard Russell and released on the UK-based XL Recordings label.

Recording took place between October 3 and December 2, 2011, in London and New York City studios, followed by a brief recording session in London on March 7, 2012. In the period between December and March recordings, Womack was admitted to hospital with pneumonia. In the period between the last recording session and the album's release he was diagnosed with colon cancer and successfully treated through surgery. The first song released from the album, "Please Forgive My Heart", was offered as a free download on XL Recordings's official website on March 8, 2012.

== Critical reception ==
Stephen M. Deusner of Pitchfork said: "Already an industry veteran by the time he broke out as a solo artist in the 1970s, Bobby Womack had a music personality to match his vocal chops. He inhabits his songs with a gruffness that cuts through even the most florid arrangements to communicate romantic agony or social outrage. Like so many of his contemporaries, he struggled in subsequent decades to match those early hits, eventually reappearing in 2010 on Gorillaz' Plastic Beach. On this first glimpse of his first album in nearly 20 years, The Bravest Man in the Universe, co-producers Damon Albarn and Richard Russell don't try to re-create the musical flourishes of his old material. Instead, they opt for a burbling piano and synth syncopation that sounds like futuristic R&B. The pair's sonic touches are hypnotic enough to sound unobtrusive, providing an intriguing contrast with Womack's coarsely textured voice, but also allowing him to sound as direct as ever. "Please Forgive My Heart" conveys regret as an existential state of being, which sounds all the more powerful for coming so late in a bold career: "Time is not commuted," he sings. "It lingers, lingers without a sound."

== Credits ==
- Damon Albarn – executive production, backing vocals, piano, drum machine, composition, synthesizer, mixing, engineering
- Jason Cox – recording, engineering, mixing
- Richard Russell – executive production, drum programming, MIDI, drum machine, MPC, AKAI MPC 500, production, mixing, engineering
- Stephen Sedgwick – recording, engineering, mixing
- Harold Payne – additional production
- Bobby Womack – lead vocals, backing vocals, guitar, various
