= Phoner to Arizona =

2010 song by Gorillaz

Song by Gorillaz

from the album The Fall
- Released: 24 December 2010
- Recorded: 3 October 2010 in Montreal
- Genre: Techno
- Length: 4:14
- Label: Parlophone
- Songwriter: Damon Albarn
- Producers: Gorillaz; Stephen Sedgwick

Music video
- "Phoner to Arizona" on YouTube

"Phoner to Arizona" is the opening track from Gorillaz's fourth studio album The Fall. The song is mostly an instrumental with distorted vocals and was recorded entirely on Gorillaz co-founder Damon Albarn's iPad during the American leg of the Escape to Plastic Beach World Tour in October 2010. The video—a compilation of footage and images taken from the tour and the phase—was posted on YouTube on 22 December as a way to promote the album.

== Personnel ==
- Damon Albarn – vocals
- Stephen Sedgwick – mixing, recording
- Geoff Pesche – mastering
