= The Fall (Gorillaz album) =

2010 studio album by Gorillaz

Studio album by Gorillaz
- Released: 25 December 2010
- Recorded: 3 October – 3 November 2010
- Genres: Lo-fi; electronic
- Length: 43:28
- Labels: Parlophone; Virgin; EMI
- Producers: Gorillaz; Stephen Sedgwick

Gorillaz chronology
iTunes Session (2010)	The Fall (2010)	The Singles Collection 2001–2011 (2011)

Damon Albarn chronology
iTunes Session (2010)	The Fall (2010)	Kinshasa One Two (2011)

Singles from The Fall
- 1. "Revolving Doors" / "Amarillo" Released: 14 March 2011

The Fall is the fourth studio album by British virtual band Gorillaz. It was first released as a download for members of the Gorillaz fan club on 25 December 2010, followed by a wider physical release on 19 April 2011 by Parlophone in the United Kingdom and Virgin Records in the United States.

Gorillaz co-founder Damon Albarn recorded The Fall during the North American leg of the Escape to Plastic Beach Tour in fall 2010 using only an iPad and a few additional instruments. Most of the album's tracks were each written and recorded in a single day, and Albarn did not make any later additions or overdubs, describing the album as "a kind of diary of my experience in America." Many of the songs and lyrics reference the locations in which they were recorded. Unlike other Gorillaz albums, The Fall features few guest artists; collaborators include Bobby Womack, and Mick Jones and Paul Simonon of The Clash. Its physical release was preceded by the double A-side single "Revolving Doors" / "Amarillo".

Critical reception for The Fall was mixed; some reviewers praised its experimental qualities and unique production process, while others felt it lacked the depth and qualities of previous Gorillaz albums. Significant attention was given to the fact that the album was produced on an iPad, with some critics referring to it as "the world's first iPad album." Commercially, it sold significantly less than its predecessors, peaking at number 12 on the UK albums chart and number 24 on the Billboard 200, partly due to limited promotion. The album was not supported by any live performances, and the band has rarely performed its songs live.

== Recording ==
The Fall was recorded on group co-founder Damon Albarn's iPad over 32 days during the North American leg of the Escape to Plastic Beach World Tour from October to November 2010 and mixed in England by Stephen Sedgwick. Other instruments that were used includes a qanun, a Korg vocoder, a ukulele, a microKORG, an Omnichord, a Minimoog Voyager, a melodica, a guitar, a piano and a Korg Monotron. Albarn said of the recording: "I literally made it on the road. I didn't write it before, I didn't prepare it. I just did it day by day as a kind of diary of my experience in America. If I left it until the New Year to release it then the cynics out there would say, 'Oh well, it's been tampered with', but if I put it out now they'd know that I haven't done anything because I've been on tour ever since".

The album includes four guest artists, three of which have worked with Albarn before. Mick Jones and Bobby Womack appeared on the previous Gorillaz album Plastic Beach, as did Paul Simonon, who also worked on Albarn's project The Good, the Bad & the Queen. American singer-songwriter Pharrell Williams of N.E.R.D. recorded a track with Albarn while touring together which did not appear on the album.

== Release and promotion ==
The album was first announced on 20 December 2010 as a holiday gift to fans. On 22 December, the music video for "Phoner to Arizona", which consists of a compilation of footage and images taken from the tour and the phase, was posted on YouTube as a way to promote the album. The album was first released to stream for free on the Gorillaz website on 25 December; it was available as a download for paying members of the band's Sub-Division club, a premium access campaign the band ran throughout 2010. The album was given an official release on 19 April 2011.

== Reception ==
Professional ratings
Aggregate scores
Source	Rating
AnyDecentMusic?	6.6/10
Metacritic	67/100
Review scores
Source	Rating
AllMusic	3/5 stars
The A.V. Club	B+
Consequence of Sound	3/5 stars
Entertainment Weekly	B−
The Guardian	3/5 stars
NME	8/10
Pitchfork Media	5.8/10
PopMatters	6/10 stars
Rolling Stone	3.5/5 stars
Slant Magazine	3/5 stars

According to the review aggregator Metacritic, The Fall received "generally favorable reviews" based on a weighted average score of 67 out of 100 from 25 critic scores. Aggregator AnyDecentMusic? gave the album a 6.6 out of 10, based on their assessment of the critical consensus. Praise focused on the album's unique qualities and experimental nature, with Rolling Stone stating that the album was "a wistfully spaced-out, subtly cheeky spin on the road-trip epic" and NME calling it "quiet but ambitious". However, some critics felt that it lacked the offerings of previous Gorillaz albums, with The Guardian stating that it was "oddly out of character" compared to Plastic Beach.

== Track listing ==
All tracks are written by Damon Albarn.

The Fall – Standard edition
No.	Title	Recorded	Length
1.	"Phoner to Arizona"	3 October, Montreal	4:14
2.	"Revolving Doors"	5 October, Boston	3:26
3.	"Hillbilly Man"	10 and 11 October, Camden and Fairfax	3:50
4.	"Detroit"	13 October, Detroit	2:03
5.	"Shy-Town"	15 October, Chicago	2:54
6.	"Little Pink Plastic Bags"	16 October, Chicago	3:09
7.	"The Joplin Spider"	18 October, Joplin	3:22
8.	"The Parish of Space Dust"	19 October, Houston	2:25
9.	"The Snake in Dallas"	20 October, Dallas	2:11
10.	"Amarillo"	23 October, Amarillo	3:24
11.	"The Speak It Mountains"	24 October, Denver	2:14
12.	"Aspen Forest"	25 October and 3 November, Santa Fe and Vancouver	2:50
13.	"Bobby in Phoenix" (featuring Bobby Womack)	26 October, Phoenix	3:16
14.	"California and the Slipping of the Sun"	30 October, Oakland	3:24
15.	"Seattle Yodel"	2 November, Seattle	0:38
Total length:			43:28

Sample credits

- "The Parish of Space Dust" contains samples of "Cowboy Town" as written by Ronnie Dunn, Larry Boone and Paul Nelson and performed by Brooks and Dunn, "Wichita Lineman", as written by Jimmy Webb and performed by Glen Campbell, and "Hawaiian War Chant (Ta-Hu-Wa-Hu-Wai)" as written by Prince Leleiohoku and performed by Spike Jones.
- "Seattle Yodel" features the Yodelling Pickle, made by the novelty retailer Archie McPhee.

== Personnel ==
Credits adapted from the liner notes for The Fall and Tidal.

=== Musicians ===
- Damon Albarn – vocals (all tracks), synthesizers (tracks 2–11, 13), vocoder (tracks 9–11), piano, guitar, Omnichord, ukulele, melodica
- Mick Jones – additional guitar (tracks 3, 10), additional conversations (track 14)
- Jesse Hackett – additional keyboards (track 6)
- Darren "Smoggy" Evans – additional conversations (tracks 7, 14)
- Mike Smith – piano (track 12)
- Paul Simonon – additional bass (track 12)
- James R Grippo – additional qanun (track 12)
- Bobby Womack – vocals, guitar (track 13)
- Jamie Hewlett – additional conversations (track 14)
- Tanyel Vahdettin – additional conversations (track 14)

=== Technical ===
- Damon Albarn – production (all tracks), recording (tracks 9–10, 13, 15)
- Stephen Sedgwick – production, recording, mixing
- Mike Smith – additional recording (track 11)
- Geoff Pesche – mastering

=== Artwork ===
- J. C. Hewlett – artwork, design, photography
- Zombie Flesh Eaters – artwork, design
- Mike Smith – photography
- Seb Monk – photography
- Oswald Lee Henderson – photography

== Charts ==
=== Weekly charts ===
Chart (2011)	Peak position
Australian Albums (ARIA)	41
Austrian Albums (Ö3 Austria)	33
Belgian Albums (Ultratop Flanders)	14
Belgian Albums (Ultratop Wallonia)	10
Canadian Albums (Billboard)	24
Danish Albums (Hitlisten)	25
Dutch Albums (Album Top 100)	21
French Albums (SNEP)	20
German Albums (Offizielle Top 100)	43
Irish Albums (IRMA)	21
Italian Albums (FIMI)	32
Japanese Albums (Oricon)	38
Mexican Albums (Top 100 Mexico)	63
Norwegian Albums (VG-lista)	24
Russian Albums (Lenta.ru/2M)	10
Scottish Albums (Official Charts)	12
South Korean Albums (Circle)	40
South Korean International Albums (Circle)	11
Spanish Albums (Promusicae)	57
Swiss Albums (Romandie)	14
Swiss Albums (Schweizer Hitparade)	13
UK Albums (Official Charts)	12
US Billboard 200	24
US Top Alternative Albums (Billboard)	3
US Top Dance Albums (Billboard)	1
US Top Rock Albums (Billboard)	5
US Indie Store Album Sales (Billboard)	6

Chart (2019)	Peak position
US Vinyl Albums (Billboard)	13

=== Year-end charts ===
Chart (2011)	Position
US Top Dance/Electronic Albums (Billboard)	15
