= Cracker Island =

Studio album by Gorillaz
- Released: 24 February 2023
- Recorded: 2020 – May 2022
- Studio: No Expectations (Los Angeles, California, US) (Note: All tracks); Studio 13 (London, UK) (Note: Tracks 1-6, 8-10); Fenixlab Multimedia Factory (Santiago de Querétaro, Mexico) (Note: Tracks 5-7); Various additional: ICP (Brussels, Belgium) (Note: Track 2); Woodshed (Malibu, California, US) (Note: Track 5); Kevin Parker Studio (Freemantle, UK); Geejam (Port Antonio, Jamaica) (Note: Track 8); Neon16 (Miami, Florida, US); IJland (Amsterdam, Netherlands)
- Genres: Pop; synth-pop; electropop; indie-funk
- Length: 37:26
- Languages: English; Spanish; Portuguese
- Labels: Parlophone; Warner
- Producers: Greg Kurstin; Gorillaz; Remi Kabaka Jr.; Kevin Parker; Tainy

Gorillaz chronology
Meanwhile EP (2021)	Cracker Island (2023)	The Mountain (2026)

Damon Albarn chronology
The Nearer the Fountain, More Pure the Stream Flows (2021)	Cracker Island (2023)	The Ballad of Darren (2023)

Singles from Cracker Island
- 1. "Cracker Island" Released: 22 June 2022; 2. "New Gold" Released: 31 August 2022; 3. "Baby Queen" Released: 4 November 2022; 4. "Skinny Ape" Released: 8 December 2022; 5. "Silent Running" Released: 27 January 2023

Cracker Island is the eighth studio album by the British virtual band Gorillaz, released on 24 February 2023. It is the band's last album to be released on Parlophone and Warner Records.

Cracker Island evolved from the shelved second season of the band's web series Song Machine, with the band instead choosing to release an entirely separate new studio album. Most of the album was recorded in 2021 in Los Angeles with Greg Kurstin producing, and was completed by May 2022. Musically, the album adopts a decidedly pop and synth-pop sound, and includes collaborations with Stevie Nicks, Thundercat, Tame Impala, Bad Bunny, Bootie Brown, and Beck. Gorillaz co-creator and frontman Damon Albarn has described Cracker Island as a loose concept album inspired by modern-day conspiracy theories and online echo chambers.

Cracker Island debuted at number one on the UK Albums Chart, becoming the first Gorillaz album to reach number one in the UK since Demon Days (2005). It also peaked at number three on the US Billboard 200 and reached the top 10 in 19 countries. The album received mostly positive reviews from critics, who praised its production and described it as a safe, but effective showcase of the band's style. It was nominated for Best Alternative Music Album at the 66th Annual Grammy Awards. The album's release was preceded by an extensive six-month world tour in 2022, the longest in the band's history, and was followed by performances at the 2023 Coachella Festival.

== Background ==
The majority of the work on the album began in 2021. "Tormenta", made in collaboration with Bad Bunny, was the first song completed. It was planned as the lead single for the second season of the Gorillaz web series Song Machine, before the project was shelved in favour of a traditional studio album (as was "New Gold", which became the second single). According to Damon Albarn, the co-creator of Gorillaz, the album was complete by May 2022. The main producer was Greg Kurstin, alongside British music producer Remi Kabaka Jr. "Baby Queen" was inspired by a 1997 meeting that Albarn had with Princess Siribha Chudabhorn at a concert in Bangkok for his band Blur.

== Promotion ==
Five singles were released from the album. Gorillaz released the first single, "Cracker Island" (featuring bassist Thundercat), on 22 June 2022. Along with this release, Gorillaz announced that the band would be following up the Meanwhile EP with a full new album. The name was announced as Cracker Island, with its release date, artwork and tracklist revealed on 31 August, alongside the release of the second single, "New Gold" (featuring Tame Impala and Bootie Brown). The third single, "Baby Queen", was released on the FIFA 23 soundtrack on 30 September, after being leaked earlier that month; it was released as a single on 4 November. The fourth single, "Skinny Ape", was released on 8 December, alongside the announcement of two virtual shows in Times Square and Piccadilly Circus on 17 and 18 December, respectively. The fifth single, "Silent Running" (featuring Adeleye Omotayo), was released on 27 January 2023, with a music video released on 8 February.

A deluxe edition of Cracker Island was released on 27 February featuring an additional five tracks: "Captain Chicken" featuring Del the Funky Homosapien (who collaborated with Gorillaz on their first album), "Controllah" featuring MC Bin Laden, "Crocadillaz" featuring De La Soul (with the late Trugoy the Dove) and Dawn Penn, a 2D piano version of "Silent Running" featuring Adeleye Omotayo, and a Dom Dolla remix of "New Gold" featuring Tame Impala and Bootie Brown.

== Critical reception ==
Professional ratings
Aggregate scores
Source	Rating
AnyDecentMusic?	7.1/10
Metacritic	80/100
Review scores
Source	Rating
AllMusic	4/5 stars
Clash	8/10
DIY	4/5 stars
Exclaim!	7/10
The Guardian	4/5 stars
The Independent	4/5 stars
NME	4/5 stars
Pitchfork	6.5/10
PopMatters	9/10
Slant Magazine	2.5/5 stars

According to the review aggregator Metacritic, Cracker Island received "generally favorable reviews" based on a weighted average score of 80 out of 100 from 23 critic scores. The aggregator website AnyDecentMusic? gave the album a 7.1 out of 10, based on their assessment of the critical consensus.

Reviewing Cracker Island for AllMusic, Stephen Thomas Erlewine called it "less an exploration of new sonic territory so much as it is a reaffirmation of [Damon Albarn's] strengths" and felt that "there's a clean, efficient energy propelling Cracker Island that gives the album a fresh pulse." Writing for Clash, Emma Harrison wrote that it "is more akin to a sprint as opposed to a marathon on the virtual virtuosos' eighth studio album ... despite its diminutive length, Cracker Island packs one hell of a punch and spans genres far and wide." In DIY, Lisa Wright declared the album "very much a set piece that prioritises concept and narrative, resulting in one of Gorillaz's most restrained, contemplative releases yet - one that will perhaps appeal to fans of Albarn's solo work more than devotees of his monkeys' more genre-hopping forays."

In Pitchfork, Ben Cardew said Cracker Island "walks a very thin line between playing to the band's strengths and relying too heavily on old tricks". In Slant Magazine, Paul Attard wrote: "When left to his own devices (and stripped of his usual slew of Tumblr-approved guests), Albarn engineers some of Cracker Island's most stand-out material, albeit ones that still vary greatly in quality. Songs like the Greg Kurstin-produced 'Tarantula' and 'Skinny Ape,' while still containing some unnecessary passages (most conspicuously the latter's ska breakdown), are comparatively barebones and cleanly produced. Even better is 'Baby Queen,' a gorgeous piece of dream-pop that cuts back on Albarn's worst theatrical tendencies."

== Track listing ==
All tracks are written by Damon Albarn and Greg Kurstin and produced by Greg Kurstin and Gorillaz, except where noted.

Cracker Island – Standard edition
No.	Title	Writer(s)	Producer(s)	Length
1.	"Cracker Island" (featuring Thundercat)	Albarn; Stephen Bruner; Kurstin	Kurstin; Gorillaz; Remi Kabaka Jr.	3:33
2.	"Oil" (featuring Stevie Nicks)		Kurstin; Gorillaz; Kabaka	3:50
3.	"The Tired Influencer"			3:31
4.	"Silent Running" (featuring Adeleye Omotayo)			4:26
5.	"New Gold" (featuring Tame Impala and Bootie Brown)	Albarn; Kevin Parker; Romye Robinson; Kurstin	Kurstin; Gorillaz; Parker	3:35
6.	"Baby Queen"		Kurstin; Gorillaz; Kabaka	3:40
7.	"Tarantula"			3:31
8.	"Tormenta" (featuring Bad Bunny)	Benito Martínez; Albarn; Kabaka	Gorillaz; Kabaka; Tainy	3:13
9.	"Skinny Ape"			4:41
10.	"Possession Island" (featuring Beck)	Albarn; Beck Hansen; Kurstin		3:26
Total length:				37:26

- On vinyl releases, "Tarantula" is placed as the fourth track, between "The Tired Influencer" and "Silent Running".

Cracker Island – Deluxe tracks
No.	Title	Length
1.	"Captain Chicken" (featuring Del the Funky Homosapien)	1:51
2.	"Controllah" (featuring MC Bin Laden)	2:30
3.	"Crocadillaz" (featuring De La Soul and Dawn Penn) (also on the Japanese release)	2:33
4.	"Silent Running (2D Piano Version)" (featuring Adeleye Omotayo)	4:23
5.	"New Gold (Dom Dolla Remix)" (featuring Tame Impala and Bootie Brown)	4:34
Total length:		15:51

== Personnel ==
Credits adapted from the liner notes.

Musicians

- Damon Albarn – vocals (all tracks), synthesisers (tracks 1–7, 9–10), electric guitar (tracks 2, 9), piano (tracks 3–4, 7, 10), bass, keyboards (track 8), acoustic guitar (track 9), Mellotron (track 10)
- Greg Kurstin – keyboards (tracks 1–9), synthesisers (tracks 1–7, 9–10), drums (tracks 1–4, 6–7, 9), percussion (tracks 1–3, 5–7, 9), bass (tracks 2–7, 10), electric guitars (tracks 3–4, 6–7, 10), piano (tracks 3–4, 6), marimba (track 3), guitars (track 5), vibraphone (tracks 6, 10), congas (track 7), Mellotron, acoustic guitar, pump organ (track 10)
- Thundercat – vocals, bass (track 1)
- Stevie Nicks – vocals (track 2)
- Adeleye Omotayo – vocals (track 4)
- Tame Impala – vocals, synthesisers, bass, guitar, drums, Wurlitzer (track 5)
- Bootie Brown – vocals (track 5)
- Bad Bunny – vocals, keyboards, percussion (track 8)
- Remi Kabaka Jr. – drum programming, percussion (track 8)
- Tainy – drum programming (track 8)
- Beck – vocals (track 10)

Technical

- Damon Albarn – production
- Greg Kurstin – engineering (all tracks), production (tracks 1–7, 9–10)
- Remi Kabaka Jr. – production (tracks 1–2, 6, 8)
- Kevin Parker – production, engineering (track 5)
- Tainy – production (track 8)
- Samuel Egglenton – engineering
- Julian Burg – engineering
- Matt Tuggle – engineering
- Henri Davies – engineering (tracks 2–3, 6, 10)
- Joel Workman – engineering (track 2)
- David Reitzas – engineering (track 5)
- Federico Foglia – engineering (track 5)
- Tim Visser – engineering (track 8)
- Mark "Spike" Stent – mixing
- Matt Wolach – mixing assistance
- Stephen Sedgwick – mixing assistance (track 8)
- Randy Merrill – mastering

Artwork

- Jamie Hewlett – artwork, design
- Stars Redmond – assistance

== Charts ==
=== Weekly charts ===
Weekly chart performance for Cracker Island
Chart (2023)	Peak position
Australian Albums (ARIA)	2
Austrian Albums (Ö3 Austria)	3
Belgian Albums (Ultratop Flanders)	2
Belgian Albums (Ultratop Wallonia)	3
Canadian Albums (Billboard)	6
Croatian International Albums (HDU)	1
Danish Albums (Hitlisten)	8
Dutch Albums (Album Top 100)	3
Finnish Albums (Suomen virallinen lista)	13
French Albums (SNEP)	3
German Albums (Offizielle Top 100)	2
Greek Albums (IFPI Greece)	34
Hungarian Albums (MAHASZ)	2
Icelandic Albums (Tónlistinn)	11
Irish Albums (Official Charts)	1
Italian Albums (FIMI)	17
Japanese Albums (Oricon)	49
Japanese Digital Albums (Oricon)	15
Japanese Hot Albums (Billboard Japan)	34
Lithuanian Albums (AGATA)	16
New Zealand Albums (RMNZ)	1
Norwegian Albums (VG-lista)	15
Polish Albums (ZPAV)	6
Portuguese Albums (AFP)	1
Scottish Albums (Official Charts)	2
Spanish Albums (Promusicae)	8
Swedish Albums (Sverigetopplistan)	19
Swiss Albums (Romandy)	1
Swiss Albums (Schweizer Hitparade)	4
UK Albums (Official Charts)	1
US Billboard 200	3
US Top Alternative Albums (Billboard)	1
US Top Rock Albums (Billboard)	1

=== Monthly charts ===
Monthly chart performance for Cracker Island
Chart (2023)	Peak position
Uruguayan Albums (CUD)	2

=== Year-end charts ===
Year-end chart performance for Cracker Island
Chart (2023)	Position
Australian Vinyl Albums (ARIA)	33
Belgian Albums (Ultratop Flanders)	164
UK Cassette Albums (OCC)	20
UK Vinyl Albums (OCC)	18
US Top Rock Albums (Billboard)	37

== Certifications ==
Region	Certification	Certified units/sales
United Kingdom (BPI)	Silver	60,000^{‡}
^{‡} Sales+streaming figures based on certification alone.
