= Sinfonia Viva =

British orchestra

Sinfonia Viva is a British orchestra based in Derby, England. It gives concerts in a number of cities and venues, including the following:

- Cleethorpes (Meridian Park)
- Derby (Cathedral, and the annual open-air concert in Darley Park)
- Grimsby
- Hereford (The Courtyard)
- Newark-on-Trent, Nottinghamshire (Palace Theatre)
- Nottingham (Royal Concert Hall)
- Pakefield
- Stamford (Stamford Arts Centre)

== History ==
Malcolm Nabarro founded the orchestra in 1982 as the East of England Orchestra in Nottingham, and served as its first artistic director through 1995. Peter Helps then became chief executive of the orchestra in 1995. In that year, the orchestra moved its residence from Nottingham to Derby, specifically to the Beaufort Business Centre. In 1996, Nicholas Kok became principal conductor of the orchestra.

The orchestra changed its name to Sinfonia Viva in 2000. Kok stood down as Sinfonia Viva's principal conductor in 2006, and then became the orchestra's principal guest conductor. André de Ridder became principal conductor of sinfonia Viva in 2007, with an initial contract of 3 years. In September 2010, the orchestra extended his contract through 2012. de Ridder concluded his tenure with sinfonia Viva after the 2011–2012 season. In September 2014, Sinfonia Viva announced the appointment of Duncan Ward as its next principal conductor, effective in January 2015, for an initial contract of 2 years. Ward concluded his tenure on 29 November 2017. In January 2018, the orchestra announced the appointment of Frank Zielhorst as its new principal conductor, with immediate effect.

The orchestra appointed its first resident composer, Anna Meredith, as part of the Royal Philharmonic Society's 'Composer in the House' scheme, in December 2009. She formally began her work with Sinfonia Viva in January 2010, and continued in the post through 2012.

Peter Helps retired as chief executive in 2021. In October 2021, the orchestra announced the appointment of Lucy Galliard as its next chief executive, effective January 2022.

Outside of conventional classical music, Sinfonia Viva made its first London appearance in May 2009 at King's Place, as part of the "East Meets West Festival", in collaboration with the Indian violinist Kala Ramnath. The orchestra has also worked with the group Gorillaz on their 2010 album Plastic Beach.

== Principal conductors ==
- Malcolm Nabarro (1982–1995) (Artistic Director, East of England Orchestra)
- Nicholas Kok (1996–2006)
- André de Ridder (2007–2012)
- Duncan Ward (2015–2017)
- Frank Zielhorst (2018–present)
