= Revolving Doors (song) =

2011 single by Gorillaz

Single by Gorillaz

from the album The Fall
- A-side: "Amarillo"
- Released: 14 March 2011
- Recorded: 5 October 2010 in Boston
- Length: 3:27
- Label: Parlophone
- Songwriter(s): Damon Albarn
- Producer(s): Gorillaz; Stephen Sedgwick

Gorillaz singles chronology
"Doncamatic" (2010)	"Revolving Doors" / "Amarillo" (2011)	"DoYaThing" (2012)

Audio
- "Revolving Doors" on YouTube

"Revolving Doors" is a double A-side single with "Amarillo" released by British virtual band Gorillaz from their fourth studio project, The Fall.

== Background ==
"Revolving Doors" was recorded in Boston, Massachusetts on 5 October 2010, during the North American leg of the band's Escape to Plastic Beach World Tour. During an interview on 5th Pirate Radio, fictional band member 2-D said of the song: "I wrote the song after I saw a set of revolving doors in a hotel. It reminded me of how far from home I was and how much I was out of place."

"Revolving Doors" was first performed live at the Leader Bank Pavilion in Boston, Massachusetts during the Humanz Tour on 12 July 2017, almost 7 years after its initial release. The performance marked the first time material from The Fall was played live.

== Personnel ==
- Damon Albarn – vocals, synthesizers
- Seye Adelekan – ukulele
- Stephen Sedgwick – mixing engineer, recording engineer
- Geoff Pesche – mastering engineer

== Charts ==
Chart (2011)	Peak position
Japan Hot Overseas (Billboard)	12
Mexico Ingles Airplay (Billboard)	34

== Critical reception ==
NME gave the single a positive review, stating: "Revolving Doors is very unlike anything Gorillaz have ever done before. As Damon's vocals introduce a fragile human touch to proceedings, Gorillaz' leader spins this lament over gentle guitars and hypnotic chants."
