= New Gold (song) =

Single by Gorillaz featuring Tame Impala and Bootie Brown

from the album Cracker Island
- Released: 31 August 2022
- Studio: No Expectations (Los Angeles, California, US); Studio 13 (London, UK); Fenixlab Multimedia Factory (Santiago de Querétaro, Mexico); Woodshed (Malibu, California, US); Kevin Parker Studio (Fremantle, Western Australia)
- Genre: Alternative pop; synth-pop; disco-funk; neo-psychedelia
- Length: 3:25
- Label: Parlophone; Warner
- Songwriters: Damon Albarn; Kevin Parker; Romye Robinson; Greg Kurstin
- Producers: Greg Kurstin; Gorillaz; Kevin Parker

Gorillaz singles chronology
"Cracker Island" (2022)	"New Gold" (2022)	"Baby Queen" (2022)

Tame Impala singles chronology
"Turn Up the Sunshine" (2022)	"New Gold" (2022)	"Wings Of Time" (2023)

Bootie Brown singles chronology
"Dirty Harry" (2005)	"New Gold" (2022)

Visualiser
- "New Gold" on YouTube

"New Gold" is a song by British virtual band Gorillaz, featuring Australian music project Tame Impala, and American rapper Bootie Brown, marking the latter's second collaboration with the band since "Dirty Harry" in 2005. The track was released on 31 August 2022 as the second single from their eighth studio album, Cracker Island. "New Gold" reached number four on the US Bubbling Under Hot 100 chart and peaked at number two on the US Alternative Airplay chart. At the APRA Music Awards of 2024, the song was shortlisted for Song of the Year.

== Background ==
"New Gold" has been in production since 2020, and its earliest teaser was a post on Noodle's Instagram from 1 February 2020. However, the track was not included on Song Machine, Season One: Strange Timez, because, according to Damon Albarn, they "never seemed to get [their] tune finished". He also hinted that the song might finally be released as a part of the second season of Song Machine. It was first played live during the Gorillaz World Tour 2022 on 19 August 2022. The song was eventually released on 31 August 2022 as the second single for Gorillaz' eighth studio album Cracker Island.

== Personnel ==
Gorillaz

- Damon Albarn – vocals, synthesisers

Additional musicians and personnel

- Tame Impala – vocals, synthesisers, bass, guitars, drums, Wurlitzer, engineering
- Bootie Brown – vocals
- Greg Kurstin – synthesisers, bass, guitars, keyboards, percussion, engineering
- Samuel Egglenton – engineering
- Julian Burg – engineering
- Matt Tuggle – engineering
- David Reitzas – engineering
- Federico Foglia – engineering
- Mark "Spike" Stent – mixing
- Matt Wolach – mixing assistance
- Randy Merrill – mastering

== Charts ==
=== Weekly charts ===
Weekly chart performance for "New Gold"
Chart (2022–2023)	Peak position
Australia (ARIA)	44
Canada Hot 100 (Billboard)	83
Canada Rock (Billboard)	8
Ireland (IRMA)	36
Lithuania (AGATA)	52
Netherlands (Single Tip)	7
Portugal (AFP)	196
Sweden Heatseeker (Sverigetopplistan)	1
UK Singles (OCC)	56
US Bubbling Under Hot 100 (Billboard)	4
US Alternative Airplay (Billboard)	2
US Hot Rock & Alternative Songs (Billboard)	15
US Rock & Alternative Airplay (Billboard)	9

=== Year-end charts ===
Year-end chart performance for "New Gold"
Chart (2023)	Position
US Alternative Airplay Songs (Billboard)	22
US Hot Rock & Alternative Songs (Billboard)	99

== Certifications ==
Certifications for "New Gold"
Region	Certification	Certified units/sales
Canada (Music Canada)	Gold	40,000^{‡}
New Zealand (RMNZ)	Platinum	30,000^{‡}
United Kingdom (BPI)	Silver	200,000^{‡}
^{‡} Sales+streaming figures based on certification alone.

== Release history ==
Release history for "New Gold"
Region	Date	Format	Label	Ref.
Various	August 31, 2022	Digital download; streaming	Parlophone; Warner	
United States	January 31, 2023	Alternative radio	Warner	
