= Baby Queen (song) =

2022 single by Gorillaz

Single by Gorillaz

from the album Cracker Island
- Released: 4 November 2022
- Studio: No Expectations (Los Angeles, California, US); Studio 13 (London, UK); Fenixlab Multimedia Factory (Santiago de Querétaro, Mexico)
- Genre: Dream pop
- Length: 3:40
- Label: Parlophone; Warner
- Songwriters: Damon Albarn; Greg Kurstin
- Producers: Greg Kurstin; Gorillaz; Remi Kabaka Jr.

Gorillaz singles chronology
"New Gold" (2022)	"Baby Queen" (2022)	"Skinny Ape" (2022)

"Baby Queen" is a song by British virtual band Gorillaz. The track was officially released on 4 November 2022 as the third single for the band's eighth studio album, Cracker Island. The track was first released on 30 September 2022 as a song in the 2022 video game FIFA 23.

== Background ==
The track was inspired by a dream frontman Damon Albarn had about a 1997 Blur concert. The concert had been attended by a then 14 year old Princess Siribha Chudabhorn. During the track "Song 2" she had gotten off her throne, which was right next to the venues mixing board and stage dived into the crowd. In a Los Angeles Times interview Albarn stated how the song is about the dream he had about the gig, where he revisited the concert as 2-D with a full-grown version of the princess where they then spent time together.

== Personnel ==
Gorillaz

- Damon Albarn – vocals, synthesisers

Additional musicians and personnel

- Greg Kurstin – keyboards, synthesisers, drums, percussion, bass, electric guitars, piano, vibraphone, engineering
- Samuel Egglenton – engineering
- Julian Burg – engineering
- Matt Tuggle – engineering
- Henri Davies – engineering
- Mark "Spike" Stent – mixing
- Matt Wolach – mixing assistant
- Randy Merrill – mastering

== Charts ==
Chart (2022)	Peak position
US Hot Rock & Alternative Songs (Billboard)	47
