= Amarillo (Gorillaz song) =

2011 single by Gorillaz

Single by Gorillaz

from the album The Fall
- A-side: "Revolving Doors"
- Released: 14 March 2011
- Recorded: 23 October 2010 in Amarillo
- Genre: Trip hop; electronica
- Length: 3:24
- Label: Parlophone
- Songwriter: Damon Albarn
- Producers: Gorillaz; Stephen Sedgwick

Gorillaz singles chronology
"Doncamatic" (2010)	"Revolving Doors" / "Amarillo" (2011)	"DoYaThing" (2012)

Audio
- "Amarillo" on YouTube

"Amarillo" is a double A-side single with "Revolving Doors" released by British alternative band Gorillaz from their iPad recorded album, The Fall. The word "amarillo" comes from Spanish and it translates to "yellow".

== Background ==
"Amarillo" was recorded in Amarillo, Texas on 23 October 2010. The song features instrumentals from The Clash band member Mick Jones.

== Personnel ==
- Damon Albarn – vocals, synthesizer, vocoder, recording engineer
- Mick Jones – guitar
- Stephen Sedgwick – mixing engineer, recording engineer
- Geoff Pesche – mastering engineer

== Critical reception ==
NME gave the single a positive review saying "Amarillo is a slow, yet euphoric song that finds Damon's reverb-laden voice evocatively recalling America's vast great interior. One of the more fully formed songs on the album, you get a vivid portrait of a songwriter from the British Isles getting his mind around one of the world's largest open spaces."
