= Empire Ants =

2010 song by Gorillaz featuring Yukimi Nagano

- Artwork used for the LP release of Doncamatic.

Song by Gorillaz and Yukimi Nagano

from the album Plastic Beach
- Released: 3 March 2010
- Studio: Studio 13, London
- Genre: Synth-pop; electro-funk; alternative dance
- Length: 4:43
- Label: Parlophone; Virgin
- Songwriters: Damon Albarn; Yukimi Nagano; Erik Bodin; Fredrik Wallin; Håkan Wirenstrand
- Producer: Gorillaz

Music video
- "Empire Ants" on YouTube

"Empire Ants" is a song by British virtual band Gorillaz, released on their third studio album Plastic Beach. It features guest vocals and instrumentation from Yukimi Nagano, the vocalist of the trip hop band Little Dragon.

== Overview ==
Gorillaz frontman Damon Albarn was first introduced to Little Dragon through his partner Suzi Winstanley, who was a fan of the band's music. Yukimi Nagano had not known of Gorillaz prior to collaborating, and was initially ambivalent towards the idea of collaboration; when Nagano's manager explained that Albarn was a member of English rock band Blur, she expressed mild surprise that Albarn still made music. Nagano later explained: "I definitely wasn’t as charged as I perhaps might have been if I knew who they were. Everyone was telling me it was a big deal."

Nagano and Albarn spent multiple days at Studio 13, Albarn's personal studio in London, England; Nagano's vocal contributions to "Empire Ants" and "To Binge" were recorded during this time. Albarn played several instrumental tracks for Nagano, allowing her to choose which would be used for the collaboration. Nagano enjoyed collaborating with Albarn, praising both the diversity of the tracks and the organic nature of the recording process.

== Personnel ==
- Damon Albarn – vocals, keyboards, rhythm guitars
- Yukimi Nagano – vocals
- Fredrik Walin – keyboards
- Håkan Wirenstand – keyboards
- Erik Bodin – drum programming
- Simon Tong – guitar
- Howie Weinberg – mastering
- Jason Cox – mixing, recording
- Stephen Sedgwick – recording, programming

== Reception ==
"Empire Ants" has received generally positive reviews. BBC Music described the song as "a trickling ballad to rank alongside Blur’s best", and Pitchfork characterized Little Dragon's contributions to Plastic Beach as "airy, elusive, and amazingly beautiful."

== Live performances ==
"Empire Ants" was performed live throughout the Escape to Plastic Beach Tour. Both Nagano and Little Dragon bassist Fredrik Wallin toured alongside Gorillaz for the North American leg of the tour, with the remainder of Little Dragon joining on for the European and Oceanic legs. The song was also performed at Coachella 2010, an event which Nagano would later claim was a turning point for her as an artist.

For the Humanz Tour, Nagano reunited with Gorillaz to perform "Empire Ants" at the Outside Lands Music Festival in San Francisco on 11 August 2017, her first performance of the song in nearly 7 years.
