= Cracker Island (song) =

Single by Gorillaz featuring Thundercat

from the album Cracker Island
- Released: 22 June 2022
- Studio: No Expectations (Los Angeles, California, US); Studio 13 (London, UK)
- Genre: Funk; synth-pop; disco
- Length: 3:33
- Label: Parlophone; Warner
- Songwriters: Damon Albarn; Stephen Lee Bruner; Greg Kurstin
- Producers: Greg Kurstin; Gorillaz; Remi Kabaka Jr.

Gorillaz singles chronology
"The Valley of the Pagans" (2020)	"Cracker Island" (2022)	"New Gold" (2022)

Thundercat singles chronology
"Fair Chance" (2020)	"Cracker Island" (2022)	"After Last Night" (2022)

Music video
- "Cracker Island" on YouTube

"Cracker Island" is a song by British virtual band Gorillaz, featuring American bassist, singer and songwriter Thundercat. The track was released on 22 June 2022 as the first single from their eighth studio album, Cracker Island. "Cracker Island" peaked at number two on the US Billboard alternative airplay chart, making it their highest charting song since "Feel Good Inc."

== Background ==
Damon Albarn stated that the song is about the idea that "people have kind of some mad ideas can all kind of live together happily in their own kind of echo chamber". "Cracker Island" was one of the five new songs that were performed live during their 2022 World Tour, before their official release, with the other songs being "Silent Running," "New Gold," "Skinny Ape," and "Possession Island".

== Music video ==
The animated music video, directed by Jamie Hewlett and Fx Goby, features the fictional bandmembers 2-D, Russel, and Noodle at the Los Angeles County Hospital on a rainy night. 2-D, seemingly intoxicated, and Noodle are being questioned by the police while 2-D hallucinates visions of Thundercat. In the middle of a dimly lit hallway, a white bed sheet with two eyeholes inexplicably rises. The sheet hovers as it slowly moves towards the main lobby. As it moves, an unknown slimy liquid can be seen left in its tracks. Meanwhile, a seemingly catatonic Russel stares at a TV, which is shown with a breaking news report regarding a "major incident below the Hollywood Sign," stating that the police "intervene[d] to stop [an] occult ceremony". Russel suddenly snaps out of his mesmerized state with a pink tint in his eyes and moves towards the others in the lobby. Just then, Murdoc arrives at the hospital in an occult robe and with a sinister smile. The other people in the lobby watch as the bed sheet ghost finally makes its way to the lobby and slowly towards Murdoc, who holds his hands out ready for an embrace. The sheet is removed to reveal a young lady underneath, who quickly ages into an elderly woman. Murdoc places his hand on her cheek endearingly before moving in for a kiss while the other people watch in shock and confusion.

== Personnel ==
Gorillaz

- Damon Albarn – vocals, synthesisers
- Jamie Hewlett – artwork, character design, video direction

Additional musicians and personnel

- Thundercat – vocals, bass
- Greg Kurstin – synthesisers, drums, keyboards, percussion, engineering
- Samuel Egglenton – engineering
- Julian Burg – engineering
- Matt Tuggle – engineering
- Mark "Spike" Stent – mixing
- Matt Wolach – mixing assistance
- Randy Merrill – mastering

== Charts ==
Chart performance for "Cracker Island"
Chart (2022)	Peak position
Canada Rock (Billboard)	4
Ireland (IRMA)	97
Mexico Ingles Airplay (Billboard)	19
New Zealand Hot Singles (RMNZ)	37
UK Singles (OCC)	94
US Alternative Airplay (Billboard)	2
US Hot Rock & Alternative Songs (Billboard)	20
US Rock & Alternative Airplay (Billboard)	5

=== Year-end charts ===
Year-end chart performance for "Cracker Island"
Chart (2022)	Position
US Alternative Airplay Songs (Billboard)	36
