= Doncamatic =

Single by Gorillaz featuring Daley

from the album The Singles Collection 2001–2011
- Released: 21 November 2010
- Recorded: September 2010
- Genre: R&B
- Length: 3:22
- Label: Parlophone
- Songwriter(s): Damon Albarn; Gareth Daley
- Producer(s): Gorillaz

Gorillaz singles chronology
"On Melancholy Hill" (2010)	"Doncamatic" (2010)	"Revolving Doors" / "Amarillo" (2011)

Daley singles chronology
"Doncamatic" (2010)	"Those Who Wait" (2012)

Music video
- "Doncamatic" on YouTube

"Doncamatic" is a song by British alternative band Gorillaz, featuring British singer Daley. It was released as a single on 21 November 2010 via digital download, with a physical release following the next day. It charted at No. 37 on the UK charts and as of 2024, remains as Gorillaz' last UK top 40 hit.

The track's title refers to Korg's Disc Rotary Electric Auto Rhythm Machine Donca Matic DA-20. Released in 1963, it was the first rhythm machine manufactured by Korg. A later version of this machine can be seen built onto the right side of the contraption behind Daley in the music video. The song, alongside the Joker remix are included as bonus tracks on the French CD reissue of Plastic Beach.

== Music video ==
The music video premiered worldwide on 15 November 2010 on Myspace. The video features a live-action Daley in a one-man submarine, on his journey to join Gorillaz and the rest of the collaborators on Plastic Beach. 2-D, dressed as a sailor, can be seen on a small screen inside the submarine whenever "talk to me" is sung in the song, as if he is trying to contact Daley. Daley travels all around the ocean to find Plastic Beach, seeing different kinds of fish, such as the Superfast Jellyfish seen in the "On Melancholy Hill", "Stylo", and "Superfast Jellyfish" music videos. He also finds the wreckage of the M. Harriet. At the end of the video, he travels around the island underwater and rises up on the surface, finally arriving at Plastic Beach.

== Track listing ==
UK CD single
No.	Title	Writers	Length
1.	"Doncamatic"	Gorillaz, Daley	3:22
2.	"Doncamatic" (Joker Remix)	Gorillaz, Daley	4:45

UK 7" picture disc
No.	Title	Writers	Length
1.	"Doncamatic"	Gorillaz, Daley	3:22
2.	"Empire Ants" (Paul Harris & Paul Rogers Vocal Mix featuring Little Dragon)	Gorillaz, Yukimi Nagano	3:53

Digital download
No.	Title	Writers	Length
1.	"Doncamatic"	Gorillaz, Daley	3:22
2.	"Doncamatic" (Joker Remix)	Gorillaz, Daley	4:46
3.	"Album Mixtape"	Gorillaz	8:29

Promotional single
No.	Title	Length
1.	"Doncamatic"	3:22
2.	"Doncamatic" (instrumental version)	3:22

== Personnel ==
- Daley – lead vocals
- Damon Albarn – background vocals, synthesizers, drum programming, sampled loops
- Geoff Pesche – mastering engineer
- Jason Cox – mixing engineer
- Stephen Sedgwick – engineering, programming

== Charts ==
Chart performance for "Doncamatic"
Chart (2010)	Peak position
Australia (ARIA)	60
Belgium (Ultratip Bubbling Under Flanders)	25
Netherlands (Single Top 100)	40
UK Singles (OCC)	37
