= Rhinestone Eyes =

2010 song by Gorillaz

Promotional single by Gorillaz

from the album Plastic Beach
- Released: 3 March 2010
- Recorded: 2009
- Studio: Studio 13 (London, UK); The Shrine (Lagos, Nigeria)
- Genre: Electro-funk
- Length: 3:20
- Label: Parlophone
- Songwriters: Damon Albarn; Jamie Hewlett
- Producer: Gorillaz

Music video
- "Rhinestone Eyes" (Storyboard) on YouTube

"Rhinestone Eyes" is a song from British virtual band Gorillaz featured on their third studio album, Plastic Beach.

== Background ==
The song was initially intended to receive a full release as the fourth single from Plastic Beach, with copies of the physical promotional single being sent to radio stations across the United States. However, just days after the copies were issued, the band made the decision to issue non-album single "Doncamatic" instead.

The song is featured in the video game FIFA 11.

== Live performances ==
The band performed the song live for the first time at the Wedgewood Rooms in Portsmouth, on 21 March 2010. The song was performed at all the shows of their Escape to Plastic Beach World Tour, held between October and December 2010. The band recorded a live set for Late Show with David Letterman on 8 October 2010. The set was released on the show's webcast, with "Rhinestone Eyes" being played on the main show.

Gorillaz also performed the song at their subsequent tours to the date.

== Music video ==
A storyboard version of a possible music video for the song was released on 4 October 2010 to the band's official YouTube channel. The storyboard begins by telling the story of how all four of the band members reunite on Plastic Beach, with the return of Russell and Noodle. The opening scene shows Russell and Noodle heading to Plastic Beach, with Noodle riding on the top of Russell's head, as he eats a hammerhead shark. The Boogieman then appears at the top of Plastic Beach, with Murdoc and Cyborg Noodle discovering him. Cyborg Noodle begins to shoot at the Boogieman, as he hides behind a statue of Pazuzu (the one on the cover of the band's album D-Sides). The Boogieman then jumps into the ocean, with 2-D noticing him from his room, and lands on an empty ship. The Boogieman then points to Murdoc and remembers a flashback in which what appear to be the Four Horsemen of the Apocalypse passing by in a desert setting, possibly Mexico, where Murdoc used to be an arms dealer, while the Boogieman is left behind on a donkey. A mysterious man approaches him and holds his hand out as a sign of friendship. As the Boogieman stretches out his hand, the man grabs his hand and the man is revealed to be Murdoc. The scene returns to normal with the Boogieman feeling outwitted as Murdoc grins. Cyborg Noodle blows up the entrance while holding a complete arsenal of weapons, surprising all of the fellow people who collaborated on Plastic Beach as her eyes start to water, similar to the Stylo video. The Boogieman then summons his own army to attack Plastic Beach while Cyborg Noodle and the collaborators try to defend the island. A whale begins to bite the bottom of Plastic Beach, scaring 2-D who is afraid of whales and puts his clown mask on his face, until Russel grabs its tail and tosses it into the sky, hitting a plane. Cyborg Noodle is startled to see Russel while Russel opens his mouth, revealing Noodle to be inside. Noodle takes off her mask and reveals some scars around her right eye.

A fan-made video featuring a fully animated, full-colour rendering of the aforementioned official storyboard was released on 31 August 2017 by South African-born Dutch American freelance animator Richard Van As, having been in production since 2011. The video was received positively by the official Gorillaz YouTube channel in the comments section of the video.

== Track listing ==
1. "Rhinestone Eyes" – 3:20
2. "Rhinestone Eyes" (instrumental) – 3:20

== Personnel ==
- Damon Albarn – vocals, synthesizers, guitar, sampled loops, drum programming
- Jason Cox – mixing, recording
- Stephen Sedgwick – recording, programming
- Gabriel Manuals Wallace – additional drums
- Howie Weinberg – mastering

== Charts ==
Chart (2010)	Peak position
Canada Rock (Billboard)	49
US Alternative Airplay (Billboard)	34
US Rock Digital Song Sales	49
Dance/Electronic Digital Song Sales	16

== Certifications ==
Region	Certification	Certified units/sales
Canada (Music Canada)	Platinum	80,000^{‡}
New Zealand (RMNZ)	Platinum	30,000^{‡}
United Kingdom (BPI)	Gold	400,000^{‡}
^{‡} Sales+streaming figures based on certification alone.
