= Meridian Park (Cleethorpes) =

Entertainment venue in North East Lincolnshire, England

Meridian Showground
- Interactive map of Meridian Showground
- Location: Cleethorpes, North East Lincolnshire, United Kingdom
- Coordinates: 53.543°N 0.006°W
- Owner: North East Lincolnshire Council
- Capacity: 5,000
- Type: Multi-purpose events
- Event: Visitor Entertainments

Construction
- Opened: 2009

Website
- {https://www.discovernortheastlincolnshire.co.uk/things-to-do/entertainment-and-arts/meridian-showground-events/}

Meridian Showground is a multi-purpose entertainment venue in Cleethorpes, North East Lincolnshire, United Kingdom. It hosted its first event organised by Solid Entertainments of Grimsby featuring The Zutons and The Proclaimers in August 2009 as part of the Cleethorpes Rocks Music Festival.

== Facilities ==
Meridian Showground was designed to be open plan, allowing promoters and organisers to design a bespoke layout for their event, also allowing for as wide range of events as possible and can accommodate all kinds of open-air entertainment in the 16,000m2 space. There is a three-story control tower with a box office, office space, PA system, first aid and lost children’s support area and two balconies overlooking the arena and queueing areas at the entrance. There are also two permanent customer toilet blocks.

== Events ==
It’s the home of a variety of events, many of which return year after year due to overwhelmingly popular demand. Meridian Showground plays host to numerous events throughout the year, from sporting events to festivals and outdoor cinema nights. The venue has seen a great uplift in events over the last few years. It hosted two concerts in 2009 and a laser display to celebrate Guy Fawkes Night in the same year. 2010's first event was the Lincolnshire Fine Food Festival, held over the weekend of 24 and 25 April. It has been the finishing point for the 2008, 2009 & 2010 Cleethorpes Carnival Parade and also hosted the 2011 1940s Weekend. More recently, the Meridian Showground (Park) hosts the annual dance festival The Gathering Fest which has international DJ's such as Judge Jules, Paul Oakenfold, Roger Sanchez, Giuseppe Ottaviani and Mauro Picotto. Due to the nature of the venue, it's ideal for sporting events, outdoor cinemas, festivals and music concerts.
