= Escape to Plastic Beach Tour =

2010 concert tour by Gorillaz

- Tour by Gorillaz
- Location: Asia; Europe; North America; Oceania
- Associated album: Plastic Beach
- Start date: 3 October 2010
- End date: 21 December 2010
- Legs: 4
- No. of shows: 37
- Supporting acts: De La Soul; Little Dragon; N.E.R.D.; We Are Wolves

Gorillaz concert chronology
- Demon Days Live (2005–06); Escape to Plastic Beach Tour (2010); Humanz Tour (2017–18)

The Escape to Plastic Beach Tour was a concert tour by the British alternative rock virtual band Gorillaz in support of their third studio album Plastic Beach. During the tour, Damon Albarn recorded The Fall, described by Albarn as a "diary of [his] experience" throughout its American leg. The album was released in late December 2010 to fan club members, and physically in April 2011. We Are Wolves, N.E.R.D., Little Dragon and De La Soul shared duties as opening acts.

== Production ==
The Escape to Plastic Beach Tour also featured new music videos and visuals on the big screen in the background while band members played up front. Visuals accompanied such songs as "Broken", "Welcome to the World of the Plastic Beach", "Dirty Harry", "Empire Ants", "Last Living Souls", "White Flag" and many others alongside the original music videos for the group's previous songs.

The poster used to promote the tour was highly influenced by the theatrical poster for the 1969 Sam Peckinpah western, The Wild Bunch.

The tour was later noted by Albarn to be an extremely costly endeavor; in a 2013 interview with Rolling Stone, Albarn explained: "I made about 20 pounds by the end of it, so I won't be going on another of those. It was incredible fun, I loved doing it, but economically it was an absolute fucking disaster."

== Set list ==
The following set list was obtained from the concert held at the Toyota Center in Houston, on 19 October 2010. It is not a representation of all shows on the tour.

1. "Orchestral Intro"
2. "Welcome to the World of the Plastic Beach" (with The Hypnotic Brass Ensemble)
3. "19-2000" (with Roses Gabor)
4. "Last Living Souls"
5. "Stylo" (with Bobby Womack & Bootie Brown)
6. "On Melancholy Hill"
7. "Rhinestone Eyes"
8. "Superfast Jellyfish" (with De La Soul)
9. "Tomorrow Comes Today"
10. "Empire Ants" (with Little Dragon)
11. "Broken" (with Hypnotic Brass Ensemble)
12. "Dirty Harry" (with Bootie Brown)
13. "El Mañana"
14. "White Flag" (with Kano & Bashy)
15. "To Binge" (with Little Dragon)
16. "Dare" (with Roses Gabor)
17. "Glitter Freeze"
18. "Plastic Beach"

Encore

20. "Cloud of Unknowing" (with Bobby Womack)
21. "Punk"
22. "Feel Good Inc." (with De La Soul)
23. "Clint Eastwood" (with Kano & Bashy)
24. "Don't Get Lost in Heaven"
25. "Demon Days"

== Tour dates ==
List of 2010 concerts
Date	City	Country	Venue
3 October	Montreal	Canada	Bell Centre
6 October	Boston	United States	Agganis Arena
8 October	New York City	United States	Madison Square Garden
10 October	Camden	United States	Susquehanna Bank Center
11 October	Fairfax	United States	Patriot Center
13 October	Detroit	United States	Fox Theatre
14 October	Toronto	Canada	Air Canada Centre
16 October	Chicago	United States	UIC Pavilion
17 October	Minneapolis	United States	Target Center
19 October	Houston	United States	Toyota Center
20 October	Grand Prairie	United States	Verizon Theatre
22 October	Austin	United States	Frank Erwin Center
24 October	Denver	United States	Wells Fargo Theatre
26 October	Phoenix	United States	Comerica Theatre
27 October	Los Angeles	United States	Gibson Amphitheatre
28 October	San Diego	United States	Viejas Arena
30 October	Oakland	United States	Oracle Arena
2 November	Seattle	United States	KeyArena
3 November	Vancouver	Canada	Rogers Arena
11 November (Note: The concert in Dublin on 11 November 2010 was originally scheduled to take place on 22 September 2010 but it was rescheduled.)	Dublin	Ireland	The O_{2}
12 November (Note: The concert in Manchester on 12 November 2010 was originally scheduled to take place on 12 September 2010 but it was rescheduled.)	Manchester	England	Manchester Evening News Arena
14 November (Note: The concert in London on 14 November 2010 was originally scheduled to take place on 14 September 2010 but it was rescheduled.)	London	England	The O_{2} Arena
15 November	Amsterdam	Netherlands	Heineken Music Hall
16 November (Note: The concert in London on 16 November 2010 was originally scheduled to take place on 15 September 2010 but it was rescheduled.)	London	England	The O_{2} Arena
17 November (Note: The concert in Birmingham on 17 November 2010 was originally scheduled to take place on 10 September 2010 but it was rescheduled.)	Birmingham	England	National Indoor Arena
18 November	Brighton	England	Brighton Centre
21 November (Note: The concert in Berlin on 21 November 2010 was originally scheduled to take place on 17 September 2010 but it was rescheduled.)	Berlin	Germany	Velodrom
22 November	Paris	France	Zénith de Paris
23 November (Note: The concert in Paris on 23 November 2010 was originally scheduled to take place on 14 September 2010 but it was rescheduled.)	Paris	France	Zénith de Paris
25 November	Antwerp	Belgium	Lotto Arena
3 December	Chek Lap Kok	Hong Kong	AsiaWorld–Arena
6 December	Perth	Australia	Burswood Dome
8 December	Adelaide	Australia	Adelaide Entertainment Centre
11 December	Melbourne	Australia	Rod Laver Arena
16 December	Sydney	Australia	Sydney Entertainment Centre
19 December	Brisbane	Australia	Brisbane Entertainment Centre
21 December	Auckland	New Zealand	Vector Arena

=== Cancelled shows ===
List of cancelled concerts
Date	City	Country	Venue
8 September 2010	Glasgow	Scotland	Glasgow SECC Arena
11 September 2010	Newcastle	England	Metro Radio Arena
5 October 2010	Hartford	United States	Toyota Oakdale Theatre
19 November 2010	Milan	Italy	Mediolanum Forum

=== Box office score data ===
Venue	City	Tickets sold / available	Gross revenue	Ref.
Lotto Arena	Antwerp	7,322 / 7,328 (99%)	$516,657	
Sydney Entertainment Centre	Sydney	9,677 / 11,651 (83%)	$950,425	
Brisbane Entertainment Centre	Brisbane	5,907 / 6,380 (92%)	$687,449	

== Live band ==
- Damon Albarn – lead vocals, keyboards, piano, acoustic guitar, melodica
- Paul Simonon – bass guitar, background vocals
- Mick Jones – rhythm guitar, background vocals
- Jeff Wootton – lead guitar (Certain dates)
- Simon Tong – lead guitar (replaced Jeff Wootton on certain dates)
- Cass Browne – drums, drum machine
- Mike Smith – keyboards
- Gabriel "Manuals" Wallace – drums, percussion
- Jesse Hackett – keyboards
- Wendi Rose - Choir direction and backing vocals

Guest collaborators and additional musicians

- Bashy – rap on "Clint Eastwood" and "White Flag"
- Kano – rap on "Clint Eastwood" and "White Flag"
- Mos Def – rap on "Stylo" and "Sweepstakes" (select dates only)
- Lou Reed – guitar and vocals on "Some Kind of Nature" (New York City and Los Angeles only)
- Bobby Womack – vocals on "Stylo", "Cloud of Unknowing" and "Demon Days"
- Neneh Cherry – vocals on "Kids with Guns" (select dates only)
- Bootie Brown – rap on "Dirty Harry" and "Stylo"
- MF Doom – rap on "Clint Eastwood" and "November Has Come" (select dates only)
- Miho Hatori – vocals on "19-2000" (select dates only)
- Yukimi Nagano – vocals on "Empire Ants" and "To Binge" (select dates only)
- De La Soul – rap on "Feel Good Inc." and "Superfast Jellyfish"
- Daley – vocals on "Doncamatic" (select dates only)
- Mark E. Smith – vocals on "Glitter Freeze" (select dates only)
- Roses Gabor – vocals on "19-2000" and "Dare"
- Members of Syrian National Orchestra for Arabic Music – orchestration on "White Flag"
- The Hypnotic Brass Ensemble – brass on "Welcome to the World of the Plastic Beach", "Broken", "Sweepstakes" and "Plastic Beach"
- Demon Strings – strings
