= On Melancholy Hill =

2010 single by Gorillaz

Single by Gorillaz

from the album Plastic Beach
- Released: 12 June 2010
- Studio: Studio 13 (London, UK)
- Genre: Synth-pop; new wave; bubblegum pop
- Length: 3:53 (album version); 3:28 (radio edit)
- Label: Parlophone
- Songwriter: Damon Albarn
- Producer: Gorillaz

Gorillaz singles chronology
"Superfast Jellyfish" (2010)	"On Melancholy Hill" (2010)	"Doncamatic" (2010)

Music video
- "On Melancholy Hill" on YouTube

"On Melancholy Hill" is the third single from British virtual band Gorillaz's third studio album, Plastic Beach. The single was released on 12 June 2010. "On Melancholy Hill" is certified Platinum in the UK.

== Background ==
The song was originally written by Damon Albarn during the production of The Good, the Bad & the Queen's self titled album. Fellow Gorillaz member Murdoc Niccals stated the following about "On Melancholy Hill" in an interview:

The Melancholy Hill – it's that feeling, that place, that you get in your soul sometimes, like someone's let your tyres down. It's nice to break up the album with something a little lighter. It's good to have something that's a genuine pop moment on every album. And this is one of those.

== Promotion ==
Part of the promotion for the single included an internet scavenger hunt for various images of the band which, when completed, gave successful hunters an exclusive remix of the track by Josh Wink. The song has been performed in almost every Gorillaz concert since the Escape to Plastic Beach Tour. In 2019, the song was featured in the third episode of the video game Life Is Strange 2. In 2024, the song was featured in the Christmas adverts for British supermarket Tesco.

== Music video ==
The music video was released worldwide on 14 June 2010. It was originally made exclusively available via iTunes, but was uploaded to the band's official YouTube channel a few days later. A teaser for the video was released on 9 June 2010, and stills of the video were published on writteninmusic.com on 11 June 2010. The video begins with huge ocean liner M. Harriet under attack by two Vought F4U Corsair fighter planes. A ship attendant finds Noodle in her room, offering to escort her to the lifeboats. Noodle says nothing, but walks over to a briefcase containing a Thompson sub machine gun and walks down the hall past the attendant with the gun. The song begins with Noodle opening fire with the sub machine gun at the two oncoming fighter planes opening fire the ship right in her direction. Noodle manages to shoot one plane down, but doesn't have enough time to shoot the other. The other plane drops a bomb on the ship. As the ship sinks, Noodle is shown to have survived and climbs into a lifeboat with only her guitar and some supplies. Later on, a gigantic Russel Hobbs lifts out of the water underneath Noodle's lifeboat. The rest of the video shows Murdoc Niccals, 2-D, and Cyborg Noodle traveling through the deep ocean with a fleet of submarines, crewed by all of the collaborators that helped make the album, including Lou Reed, De La Soul, Snoop Dogg, Mick Jones, Paul Simonon, and Gruff Rhys. As they travel, a swarm of "Superfast Jellyfish" are seen and inadvertently sucked into some of the submarines. The submarines then rise to the surface, where a large manatee is sitting atop a tall sea stack. Murdoc spots the Boogieman leaning over the creature and, shocked by the sight, orders Cyborg Noodle to attack it. Cyborg Noodle pulls out a pump-action shotgun and shoots at the Boogieman, but she misses, hitting his clothes. He grabs the manatee and dives into the ocean. When the fog behind the plateau clears, it reveals Plastic Beach.

== Chart performance ==
"On Melancholy Hill" entered the UK Singles Chart at #133 on 28 June 2010, before peaking at #78 on 4 July 2010. After entering at #20 on the UK Dance Chart, the single peaked at #13 on 4 July 2010. On 26 January 2011, "On Melancholy Hill" entered the Triple J Hottest 100, 2010 at #42.

== Personnel ==
- Damon Albarn – vocals, synthesizers, acoustic guitar, drum programming
- Stephen Sedgwick – recording, programming
- Jason Cox – mixing, recording
- Howie Weinberg – mastering

== Track listing ==
- Digital download / iTunes LP
1. "On Melancholy Hill" (album version) – 3:53
2. "On Melancholy Hill" (The Japanese Popstars Remix) (edit) – 7:35
3. "On Melancholy Hill" (She Is Danger Remix) – 4:21
4. "Stylo" (Labrinth SNES Remix) (featuring Tinie Tempah) – 4:15
5. "On Melancholy Hill" (video) – 4:26
6. "On Melancholy Hill" (storyboard animatic) – 3:30
7. "Welcome to the World of the Plastic Beach" (live visuals) – 3:35
- Promotional CD single
1. "On Melancholy Hill" (radio edit) – 3:28 (2:58 on the UK promo)
2. "On Melancholy Hill" (album version) – 3:53
3. "On Melancholy Hill" (instrumental) – 3:53
- Promotional CD single - Remixes
1. "On Melancholy Hill" (Josh Wink Remix) – 5:03
2. "On Melancholy Hill" (Josh Wink Dub) – 7:40
3. "On Melancholy Hill" (The Japanese Popstars Remix) (edit) – 7:35
4. "On Melancholy Hill" (She Is Danger Remix) – 4:21
5. "On Melancholy Hill" (We Have Band Remix) – 5:13
- Promotional 2011 Gorillaz scavenger hunt
1. "On Melancholy Hill" (Baby Monster Remix) – 4:02

== Charts ==
Chart (2010)	Peak position
Australia (ARIA)	94
Belgium (Ultratip Bubbling Under Flanders)	22
Belgium (Ultratip Bubbling Under Wallonia)	22
Mexico Ingles Airplay (Billboard)	14
UK Singles (Official Charts)	78
UK Dance (Official Charts)	13

Chart (2025)	Peak position
US Hot Rock & Alternative Songs (Billboard)	25

== Certifications ==
Region	Certification	Certified units/sales
Denmark (IFPI Danmark)	Platinum	90,000^{‡}
New Zealand (RMNZ)	2× Platinum	60,000^{‡}
Spain (Promusicae)	Gold	30,000^{‡}
United Kingdom (BPI)	Platinum	600,000^{‡}
^{‡} Sales+streaming figures based on certification alone.
