= Superfast Jellyfish =

Single by Gorillaz featuring Gruff Rhys and De La Soul

from the album Plastic Beach
- Released: 9 May 2010
- Recorded: 2009
- Studio: Studio 13 (London, UK)
- Genre: Hip hop; funk
- Length: 2:54
- Label: Parlophone
- Songwriters: Damon Albarn; Gruff Rhys; David Jolicoeur; Kelvin Mercer
- Producer: Gorillaz

Gorillaz singles chronology
"Stylo" (2010)	"Superfast Jellyfish" (2010)	"On Melancholy Hill" (2010)

Gruff Rhys singles chronology
"Gyrru Gyrru Gyrru" b/w "Y Creadur" (2007)	"Superfast Jellyfish" (2010)	"Shark Ridden Waterw" b/w "I Totally Understand" (2010)

De La Soul singles chronology
"Thou Shalt Always Kill" (2009)	"Superfast Jellyfish" (2010)	"Get Away" (2013)

Music video
- "Superfast Jellyfish" - a visual accompaniment on YouTube

"Superfast Jellyfish" is the second single released from British alternative band Gorillaz' third studio album, Plastic Beach. The single was released on 9 May 2010.

== Background ==
The song features vocals from Gruff Rhys, lead singer of Super Furry Animals, and from De La Soul, who were previously featured on "Feel Good Inc.". The song contains samples from a 1986 commercial for Swanson's microwave "Great Starts Breakfasts" and an episode of Natural World, "Sperm Whales: Back from the Abyss", narrated by David Attenborough.

== Release history ==
The track premiered on BBC Radio 1's Zane Lowe show on 25 February 2010. About an hour later, it was uploaded to the official Gorillaz YouTube channel. The first official remix of the track, by Unicorn Kid, was premiered on BBC Radio 1's Zane Lowe show on 12 April 2010. On 27 April 2010, the group performed the song live on "Later... with Jools Holland."

== Music video ==
The official music video for "Superfast Jellyfish" was uploaded to YouTube by Jamie Hewlett on 8 March 2010. The video shows a man waking up at the sound of an alarm, going downstairs, and cooking a box of Superfast Jellyfish in his microwave. Once ready, he begins to eat one of the jellyfish, however, he is sent into a trance in which the jellyfish perform a dance around his head. The song received over two million views on Gorillaz' official YouTube channel before the release of the official video.

== Track listing ==
- Promotional CD single
1. "Superfast Jellyfish" – 2:54
2. "Superfast Jellyfish" (instrumental) – 2:47
- Promotional CD single - Remixes
1. "Superfast Jellyfish" (Unicorn Kid Remix) – 3:34
2. "Superfast Jellyfish" (Evil Nine Remix) – 6:09
3. "Superfast Jellyfish" (Mighty Mouse Remix) – 6:48

== Personnel ==
- Damon Albarn – vocals, synthesizers, sampled loops, drum programming
- De La Soul – vocals
- Gruff Rhys – vocals, additional guitar
- Jason Cox – mixing, recording
- Gabriel Manuals Wallace – additional drums
- Howie Weinberg – mastering
- Stephen Sedgwick – recording, programming

== Charts ==
Chart (2010)	Peak position
Australian ARIA Urban Singles Chart	33
Danish Dance Chart	50
Japan (Japan Hot 100)	90
Mexico Ingles Airplay (Billboard)	17
UK Dance Chart	28
