= Plastic Beach =

2010 studio album by Gorillaz

- Standard edition cover

Studio album by Gorillaz
- Released: 3 March 2010
- Recorded: June 2008 – November 2009
- Studios: Studio 13 (London, England) (Note: All tracks); Rolls-Royce Factory (Derby, England) (Note: Tracks 1, 13 and 15); Capitol (Hollywood, California) (Note: Track 2); Chung King (New York City) (Note: Tracks 2, 5, 9, 12 and 15); Dar al-Assad for Culture and Arts (Damascus, Syria) (Note: Track 3); The Shrine (Lagos, Nigeria) (Note: Track 4)
- Genres: Pop; electronic; funk; hip hop; trip hop
- Length: 56:46
- Labels: Parlophone; Virgin; EMI
- Producer: Gorillaz

Gorillaz chronology
D-Sides (2007)	Plastic Beach (2010)	iTunes Session (2010)

Damon Albarn chronology
All the People: Blur Live at Hyde Park (2009)	Plastic Beach (2010)	iTunes Session (2010)

Singles from Plastic Beach
- 1. "Stylo" Released: 26 January 2010; 2. "Superfast Jellyfish" Released: 9 May 2010; 3. "On Melancholy Hill" Released: 12 June 2010

Plastic Beach is the third studio album by British virtual band Gorillaz, released on 3 March 2010 by Parlophone internationally and by Virgin Records in the United States.

Plastic Beach evolved from an unfinished project entitled Carousel, which Gorillaz co-creators Damon Albarn and Jamie Hewlett began conceptualizing in late 2007 after collaborating on the stage production Monkey: Journey to the West. Unlike previous Gorillaz albums which were recorded with outside producers, Albarn chose to self-produce Plastic Beach, recording from June 2008 to November 2009 in various locations including London, New York City, and Damascus. The album features a larger roster of guest artists compared to previous Gorillaz albums, including Snoop Dogg, Gruff Rhys, De La Soul, Bobby Womack, Mos Def, Lou Reed, Mark E. Smith, Bashy, Kano and Yukimi Nagano from Little Dragon.

A concept album, Plastic Beach adopts environmentalist themes, presenting the titular Plastic Beach as a "secret floating island deep in the South Pacific... made up of the detritus, debris, and washed-up remnants of humanity," inspired by marine pollution such as the Great Pacific Garbage Patch. Musically, the album adopts a primarily electronic, synth-pop sound, with additional influences including hip-hop, funk and orchestral. As with other Gorillaz albums, Plastic Beach was promoted through various multimedia created by Hewlett, including interactive websites, animated music videos and short cartoons. The album produced three singles: "Stylo", "Superfast Jellyfish" and "On Melancholy Hill". Further single releases and promotion for the album were planned, but ultimately canceled due to budgetary issues.

Plastic Beach received mostly positive reviews upon release and was later named by several critics as one of the best albums of the 2010s. The album debuted at number two on both the UK Albums Chart and the US Billboard 200 and reached the top 10 in 22 countries, though its sales ultimately underperformed those of the band's previous two albums. The album was supported with the Escape to Plastic Beach Tour and performances at various global music festivals, the band's first live performances performed in full, unobscured view of the audience.

== Background ==
=== Carousel ===
The creators of Gorillaz, musician Damon Albarn and artist Jamie Hewlett, began working on a new project in late 2007 titled Carousel, which later evolved into Plastic Beach, the group's third studio album. When asked about his top priority for 2008, Albarn replied, "Well, I'm doing the next Gorillaz thing, but it won't be called Gorillaz." Hewlett further elaborated in a February 2008 Gorillaz-Unofficial interview, likening their vision to "how the Who presented their movies – Tommy and Quadrophenia and so on" with their films "presented as by 'the Who', even though none of the members of the band were in the movies. ... But it's the same people working on it". In a July 2008 interview with The Observer, Hewlett added that Gorillaz became "more of an organisation of people doing new projects", and that Carousel would be "bigger and more difficult" than their previous endeavor Monkey: Journey to the West; he also stated Albarn had already written around "70 songs" during this time. Carousel was to be about the mystical aspects of Britain.

Well... originally [Carousel] was a film but now we think it's a film and it's a stage thing as well and... look, it's basically us doing what the fuck we want without worrying about whether it's for a record company or a film company or whatever.

— Co-creator Jamie Hewlett on Carousel

=== Concept ===
Damon Albarn got the idea for Plastic Beach while on a beach next to his house: "I was just looking for all the plastic within the sand", he said. On 17 September 2008, Albarn and Jamie Hewlett announced that they would be doing another Gorillaz album in an interview with CBC News. Hewlett said that from their work on Monkey, "we just learned more about what we do, musically and artistically. That's a great place to come at when we come to another Gorillaz album. It doesn't have to be animation and music". Hewlett also expressed annoyance at having to draw the band members again: "I'm so f---ing [sic] bored of drawing those characters. But then we had a moment where we had a new angle on it... I'm gonna adapt them". In a later interview Hewlett said: "they'll be the same characters, but a little bit older and told in a different way".

The first time Albarn went to Mali, he was taken to a landfill where he observed how differently rubbish was dealt with compared to England; he had previously visited a landfill outside London to record the sound of seagulls for the album. In Mali, the landfill had "more snakes... like adders, grass snakes, slow worms, toads, frogs, newts, all kinds of rodents, all kinds of squirrels, a massive number of squirrels, foxes, and obviously, seagulls. [...] This is part of the new ecology. And for the first time I saw the world in a new way. I've always felt, I'm trying to get across on this new record, the idea that plastic, we see it as being against nature but it's come out of nature. We didn't create plastic, nature created plastic. And just seeing the snakes like living in the warmth of decomposing plastic bags. They like it. It was a strange kind of optimism that I felt... but trying to get that into pop music is a challenge, anyway. But important."

Albarn said in September 2008 that he wanted "to work with an incredibly eclectic, surprising cast of people". As with previous Gorillaz albums, Plastic Beach features collaborations with several artists; it features Snoop Dogg, Hypnotic Brass Ensemble, Kano, Bashy, Bobby Womack, Mos Def, Gruff Rhys, De La Soul, Little Dragon, Mark E. Smith, Lou Reed, Mick Jones, Paul Simonon, sinfonia Viva and the Syrian National Orchestra for Arabic Music.

=== Possible sequel ===
In October 2020, Albarn stated that he had "loads and loads of songs" for a direct sequel to Plastic Beach, citing "the need to keep reminding people that we need to change our habits" as his main reason for revisiting the album's themes. He added, "I'd like to just have an album called Clean Beach, but at the moment it's still Plastic Beach."

== Recording ==
Albarn began recording material for a new Gorillaz album around June 2008. He travelled to Beirut in March 2009 to record with the National Orchestra for Oriental Arabic Music. The following month, he recorded with Derby-based orchestra sinfonia Viva. Grime MCs Kano and Bashy, who feature on "White Flag", both had the flu during recording. Kano said, "We weren't feeling great, the music was out of our comfort zone, it could have been a complete disaster". Bobby Womack knew nothing about Gorillaz and was initially unsure about the collaboration, however, his daughter liked Gorillaz and convinced him to do it. Womack was told to sing whatever was on his mind during the recording of "Stylo". "I was in there for an hour going crazy about love and politics, getting it off my chest", said Womack. After an hour of recording, Womack, a diabetic, started to pass out. He was sat down and given a banana, before waking up minutes later. "Sweepstakes", the first song Mos Def recorded with Gorillaz, was done in one take. Mos Def described the song as "one of the greatest things as an MC that I've ever done". Mick Jones and Paul Simonon completed their portion of the title track "Plastic Beach" in a day.

Over the course of a year, Albarn had emailed Lou Reed a total of three times about a possible collaboration for the album, and Reed declined each time, citing a lack of interest with the song ideas that he was sent. On the fourth attempt, Albarn sent a demo version of "Some Kind of Nature", to which Reed responded more positively, and he finally accepted the band's invitation to working with him. Once the trio of Albarn, Hewlett and producer Remi Kabaka Jr. arrived to record with Reed at Chung King Studios in New York, Reed declined the latter two's entry and only let Albarn in. After the two sat down and drank tea together, Reed left for a short period, got in a taxi, wrote lyrics for the song during a ride uptown, and subsequently returned with "[his] thoughts on plastic".

"This record has only scratched the surface of [that] period of work and the sort of adventures we went on," Albarn said. The unreleased material is "some really out-there stuff, which hopefully will see the light of day at some point". Among these is a song Gorillaz wanted to record with Engelbert Humperdinck. "He was supposed to do it, but then he declined, which was a real shame", Albarn explained to New York magazine. "It's a very dramatic song, very moving. Arabic strings. It's imagining Earth losing its gravitational pull and starting to fall". As it turned out, Humperdinck's manager had listened to the proposed selection and declined the offer for him without his knowing. Humperdinck later stated in an interview that his manager declining the collaboration offer was "the most grievous sin ever committed", and that he would have gladly collaborated with Gorillaz if he had known they asked. With or without Humperdinck, Albarn insists the tune will eventually be released. "I'm going to finish that off", he said. "It just needs the vocal. We've made contact with Indian singer Asha Bhosle and I think it's definitely going to happen. I'll maybe duet with her; the song has these answering phrases". The band were also rebuffed by former Sex Pistols' frontman John Lydon and Tom Waits.

Several musicians who collaborated on songs for the album did not end up having all or any of their songs appear on the final album; some guests announced to have collaborated with the band do not feature on the album. British garage rock band The Horrors were invited to play on the album after Albarn heard their 2009 album Primary Colours. They recorded a track with Albarn, but no songs with the band appear on the final album. In an interview with Entertainment Weekly, Posdnuos of De La Soul said that the group had provided vocals on two songs for the album, "Electric Shock" and "Sloped Tropics". De La Soul only features on one song on the album, titled "Superfast Jellyfish". Gruff Rhys recorded two songs – "Superfast Jellyfish" and "Leviathan". The latter, described by Rhys as "more of a night-time song, a three o'clock in the morning, speeding down the autobahn evading West German police-type track", does not feature on the album. Mos Def said that he collaborated with Albarn on three songs; however, Def only appears on two songs on the album. In a 2023 interview with Zane Lowe, Albarn confirmed the third song was called "Fresh Arrivals" and additionally featured Syrian dabke artist, Omar Souleyman – the song was later re-worked as "Damascus" from the band's 9th studio album, The Mountain with both artists. Elements of the unreleased song "Float Tropics", which featured De La Soul, were also used on The Mountain on the song "The Moon Cave", with some of the late David Jolicoeur's vocals from the unreleased song mixed in. Albarn had previously announced that musician Barry Gibb would feature on the album but Gibb did not turn up to any recording sessions.

== Music ==
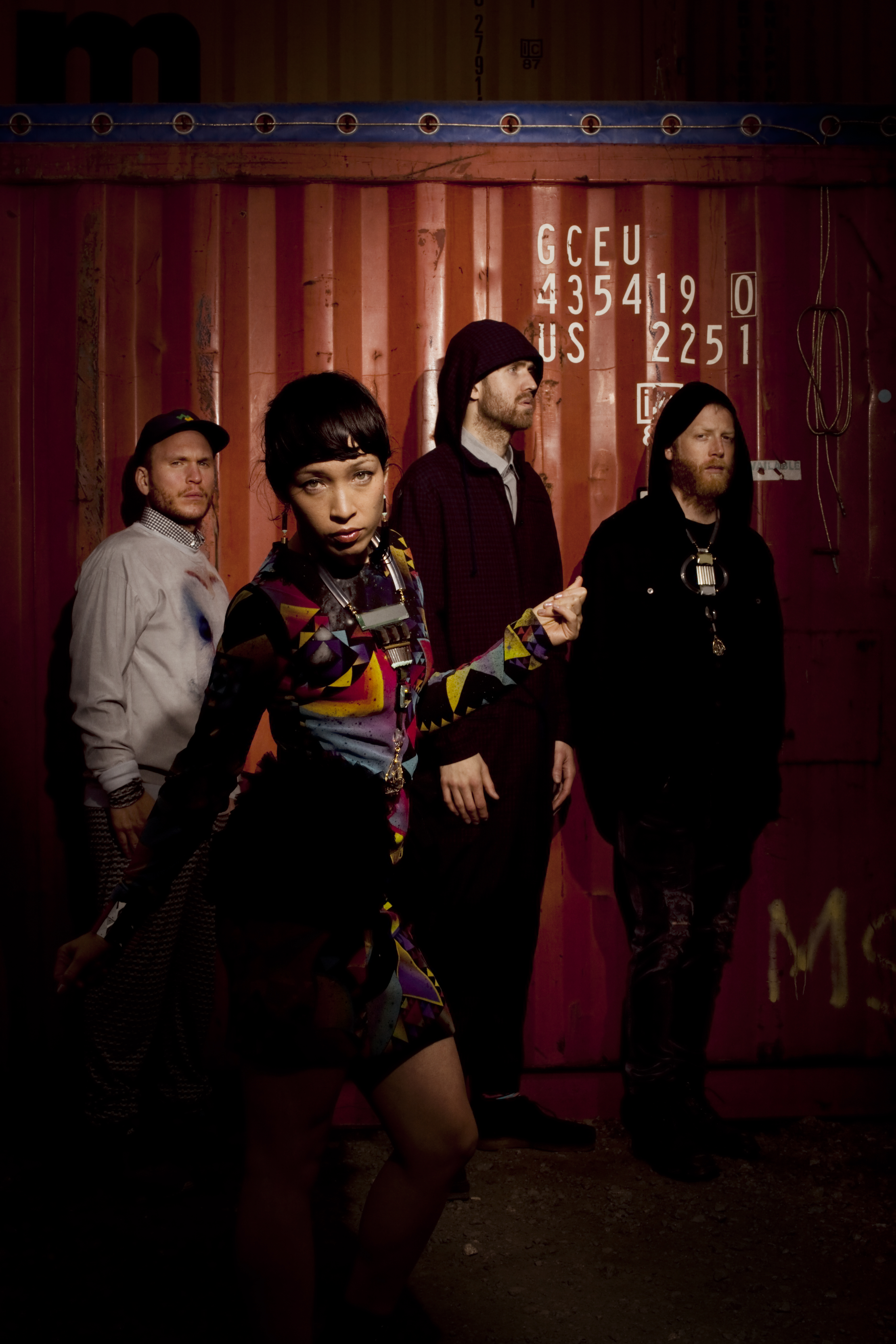
Yukimi Nagano of Little Dragon features on the track "Empire Ants", with instrumental support from the whole group. Nagano (second from left) also contributes vocals on "To Binge".

According to The Times journalist Peter Paphides, Plastic Beach is a pop and concept album, while AllMusic editor Stephen Thomas Erlewine said that "Damon's painstaking pancultural pop junk-mining" on the album posits hip hop with Britpop and "accentuates moody texture over pop hooks". Pitchfork's Sean Fennessey wrote that "ornate Village Green Preservation Society-style pop" is the dominant style on Plastic Beach, but that Albarn also "dips into Krautrock, funk, and dubstep, as well as the weary, more melodic music he's been perfecting for much of last decade" on an album that serves as "sort of an electronic take on baroque pop." According to Mojo magazine's Danny Eccleston, the album reprises the "combination of stupid-fresh pop melody, 21st-century hip hop substructure and catholic cast of collaborators" featured on Demon Days, while Miles Marshall Lewis of The Village Voice observed "funky electroclash" and hip hop elements in the music. Lawrence Vaughan of DIY saw it as combining "world music and a more subdued lo-fi electronic sound. AbsolutePunk called Plastic Beach as a "full-blown trip hop/hip hop album", while HipHopDX observed elements of soft rock and surf rock. Kitty Empire described it as "rolling from space-age electro to mournful soul and back again." Jessicka Lee Loduca of Exclaim! saw it as a demonstration of the band's "picturesque mishmash of rhymes, pop, disco, orchestration, blues and dark electronic beats. Wired observed classical influences and world music overtones. Noel Murray of The A.V. Club wrote that the record “chops up Bollywood, space-age lounge, stoner funk, and wistful music-hall.” Nora Harun of PAN M 360 said of the album "A common theme and the injection of electronic rhythms give a beautiful unity to this eclectic tapestry. Albarn delivers some of his best orchestrations with the dreamlike synths of 'On Melancholy Hill' and 'Rhinestone Eyes'," while describing it as electropop, hip hop and alternative rock.

Albarn said in an interview, "I'm making this one the most pop record I've ever made in many ways, but with all my experience to try and at least present something that has got depth." He added, "I suppose what I've done with this Gorillaz record is I've tried to connect pop sensibility with ... trying to make people understand the essential melancholy of buying a ready made meal in loads of plastic packaging. People who watch X Factor might have some emotional connection to these things, this detritus that accompanies what seems to be the most important thing in people's eyes, the celebrity voyeurism."

Albarn says the album maintains a lot of the melancholy from Carousel. He worked hard on making his lyrics and melodies clear on the album. "Loads of orchestral stuff" was recorded but only a fraction made it onto the final album. On 14 January 2009, Damon Albarn appeared on BBC Radio 1 with animated bass player Murdoc Niccals, and played a selection of songs including four demos for Plastic Beach: "Electric Shock", which features Derby-based Orchestra sinfonia ViVA (a song which does not appear on the album, although certain elements of it were used in "Rhinestone Eyes"), the demo for "Stylo" (which was named "Binge" at that point) and the demo for "Broken".

== Release and promotion ==
The Plastic Beach logo used in promotional videos

A new picture of the band was published on 9 December 2009 on the cover of the UK edition of Wired magazine. On 14 January 2009, Albarn made an appearance as a guest DJ on BBC Radio 1, premiering demos of three new Gorillaz songs – "Electric Shock", "Broken" and "Stylo". "Stylo" was heavily edited for its final version, while "Broken" remained mostly unchanged. "Electric Shock" did not make the album, though samples of the song were used in "Rhinestone Eyes", as well as the intro orchestral separated into bonus track "Three Hearts, Seven Seas, Twelve Moons".

On 20 January 2010, the official Gorillaz website was heavily revamped to fit the Plastic Beach theme. Over a period of time, numerous short clips were posted on the site, mainly showing various shots of a large Plastic Beach model backed by segments of new Gorillaz music. Out of the 13 short clips, only two of the clips had audio that would eventually end up on the album. The tracks were "White Flag" and "Pirate's Progress" (an extended version of the Orchestral Intro found on the album). Also on the website was a countdown timer, which on 23 February 2010 counted down to zero. After a significant delay, a new full Kong studios-esque interactive Plastic Beach "Beachsite" was uploaded onto the website, opening certain sections of Plastic Beach to be visited by guests.

On 21 January 2010, Gorillaz member Murdoc "took over" NME Radio and Yahoo! Radio. He played a 45-minute set of songs while providing exposition on the story of Gorillaz. A total of four broadcasts were uploaded online, leading to the release of the album. All four were available on the official Gorillaz website.

Similar to the previous album, short animated "idents" were released for fictional band members Murdoc, 2-D, Russel, and the Noodle cyborg. The first depicted Murdoc fleeing from an unknown, rifle-wielding assailant (featuring a clip of "Three Hearts, Seven Seas, Twelve Moons" in the background), and the second depicted 2-D's abduction and transportation to Plastic Beach by a masked figure, later revealed to be the Boogeyman (with a snippet of the instrumental version of "Rhinestone Eyes"). The track can be found as a bonus track along with "Pirate's Progress" on the iTunes Deluxe edition. Russel's ident had him stomping off of the edge of a pier and diving into the ocean, presumably headed to Plastic Beach for reasons unknown. The fourth featured a zoom in on Cyborg Noodle with its face plate open. A fifth ident was also released, showing a luxury cruise sail being bombarded by torpedoes coming from planes flying above it. A crew member rushes over to cabin 13 to warn a passenger, who is revealed to be Noodle (wearing the oni mask), that the cruise is under attack by pirates and he was told to escort her to the lifeboats. Noodle then grabs her briefcase and opens it, revealing a gun, and passes the crew member while heading out, presumably to face the pirates. Noodle's ident acts as a trailer to the "On Melancholy Hill" music video, which was released on 15 June.

On 26 February 2010, a "minimix" of the album was made available on the official website to download for free. The minimix is an eight-minute composition of songs from the album, a number of which had not been previously released.

"Welcome to the World of the Plastic Beach", "Rhinestone Eyes" and "White Flag" were premiered on the Australian radio station Triple J on 28 February 2010, in respective order, at one-hour intervals. On 1 March 2010, NPR debuted the entire album via streaming. Later that same day, the album also became available for streaming at Guardian.co.uk.

=== Singles ===
The album spawned three singles.

- "Stylo" peaked at number 24 on the Billboard Alternative Songs chart.
- "Superfast Jellyfish" peaked at number 28 on the UK Dance Chart.
- "On Melancholy Hill" peaked at number 78 on the UK Singles Chart.

Originally, "Rhinestone Eyes" and "To Binge" were both slated to release as the 4th and 5th singles respectively. However, both releases were cancelled in favor of the non-album single "Doncamatic". A storyboard version of a possible music video for "Rhinestone Eyes" was released on 4 October 2010 to the band's official YouTube channel. Although it wasn't released commercially, the song peaked at number 35 on the Billboard Alternative Songs chart.

== Reception ==
Professional ratings
Aggregate scores
Source	Rating
AnyDecentMusic?	8.0/10
Metacritic	77/100
Review scores
Source	Rating
AllMusic	5/5 stars
The A.V. Club	B+
Entertainment Weekly	B
The Guardian	4/5 stars
The Independent	4/5 stars
NME	7/10
Pitchfork	8.5/10
Q	5/5 stars
Rolling Stone	3.5/5 stars
Spin	7/10

Plastic Beach debuted at number two on the UK Albums Chart, selling 74,432 copies in its first week. The album also debuted at number two on the US Billboard 200 with first-week sales of 112,000 copies, of which 62,000 were digital copies. As of 25 March 2010, Plastic Beach sold 8,136 copies in Japan and debuted at number 17 on the Oricon Albums Chart. Selling 13,822 copies in France, Plastic Beach debuted at number two on the SNEP albums chart.

According to the review aggregator Metacritic, Plastic Beach received "generally favorable reviews" based on a weighted average score of 77 out of 100 from 34 critic scores. In Rolling Stone, Rob Sheffield called it "Gorillaz's third excellent album in a row". while Q magazine's David Everley described it as "some of the most forward-thinking pop you'll hear this or any year", and Uncut's John Lewis said it was "a brilliant concept album, full of perfect pop singles." Michael Kabran of PopMatters wrote that "the band's trademark brand of electro-funk-hip-pop is more focused, with tighter production and more sure-fire hooks." Kitty Empire wrote for The Guardian that though the album's "electronic pop songs are more sneaky than sure-fire ... it is probably Gorillaz's most engrossing project so far." AllMusic's Stephen Thomas Erlewine said the album's success depends on Albarn's growth as a composer: "he's a master of subtly shifting moods and intricately threaded allusions, often creating richly detailed collages that are miniature marvels." Pete Paphides wrote in The Times, "this concept group has delivered its most fully realised concept album". In the Chicago Tribune, Greg Kot was impressed by Albarn's ability to produce exceptional music using "seemingly mismatched elements from different cultures, genres and generations". Alexis Petridis also of The Guardian commended Albarn for his "kaleidoscopic musical ambition" and said despite some failed experiments, "there's something hugely impressive about Albarn's ability to coax artists out of their comfort zone."

In a negative review, Los Angeles Times writer Mikael Wood said that "too many of these 16 hazy, half-crazy tracks sound like undercooked studio goofs", panning its second half as "one long, jammy drone, with none of Albarn's melodic or lyrical gifts on display". Danny Eccleston from Mojo commented that "Albarn and co's eco-parable is loud but not clear." Entertainment Weekly's Leah Greenblatt viewed its "sonic drift" as "dull, and even dispiriting" in the album's second half, stating "In the end, Beach offers a vision of the future as digitised kitsch: groovy, yes, but lonely too". Jon Caramanica of The New York Times viewed its music as "thin and inconsequential, car-commercial electronic funk and tension-free hip-hop", while writing "It's an appealing mess, moving at a fever pitch until swelling to something like an enthused climax. But still, a mess". Writing for MSN Music, Robert Christgau singled out "Some Kind of Nature" and "Superfast Jellyfish" as "choice cuts", indicating good songs on an album that he felt was otherwise unworthy of listeners' money or time.

At the end of 2010, Plastic Beach appeared on several critics' top-ten lists of the year's best albums. The album was ranked tenth best by both Hot Press and Slant Magazine, ninth by Rockdelux, seventh by Q, sixth by Filter, fifth by State, fourth by Consequence of Sound, and third by both Beats Per Minute and The Age. It was also voted the 30th best record of 2010 in the Pazz & Jop, an annual poll of American critics published by The Village Voice. In 2020, the album was ranked at 66 on the 100 Best Albums of the Century list by Stacker.

== Track listing ==
Plastic Beach – Standard edition
No.	Title	Writer(s)	Length
1.	"Orchestral Intro"	Gorillaz	1:09
2.	"Welcome to the World of the Plastic Beach" (with Snoop Dogg)	Gorillaz; Snoop Dogg	3:35
3.	"White Flag" (with Bashy and Kano)	Gorillaz; Bashy; Kano	3:43
4.	"Rhinestone Eyes"	Gorillaz	3:20
5.	"Stylo" (with Mos Def featuring Bobby Womack)	Gorillaz; Mos Def	4:30
6.	"Superfast Jellyfish" (with Gruff Rhys featuring De La Soul)	Gorillaz; De La Soul; Gruff Rhys	2:54
7.	"Empire Ants" (with Yukimi Nagano)	Gorillaz; Nagano	4:43
8.	"Glitter Freeze" (with Mark E. Smith)	Gorillaz; Smith	4:03
9.	"Some Kind of Nature" (with Lou Reed)	Gorillaz; Reed	2:59
10.	"On Melancholy Hill"	Gorillaz	3:53
11.	"Broken"	Gorillaz	3:17
12.	"Sweepstakes" (with Mos Def)	Gorillaz; Mos Def	5:20
13.	"Plastic Beach"	Gorillaz	3:47
14.	"To Binge" (with Yukimi Nagano)	Gorillaz; Nagano	3:55
15.	"Cloud of Unknowing" (featuring Bobby Womack)	Gorillaz; Womack	3:06
16.	"Pirate Jet"	Gorillaz	2:32
Total length:			56:46

Plastic Beach – iTunes Store bonus tracks
No.	Title	Length
17.	"Pirate's Progress" (also on the Japanese edition)	4:01
18.	"Three Hearts, Seven Seas, Twelve Moons"	2:14
19.	"Stylo" (music video)	5:02
Total length:		68:03

=== Sample credits ===
- "Superfast Jellyfish" contains samples from a Swanson advertisement for Great Starts frozen breakfast sandwiches and an episode of Natural World, "Sperm Whales: Back from the Abyss", narrated by David Attenborough.

== Personnel ==
Credits adapted from the liner notes of the Experience Edition of Plastic Beach.

=== Musicians ===
- Gorillaz – performers
- Sinfonia Viva – orchestra (tracks 1, 15)
- André de Ridder – conducting, orchestral arrangements (tracks 1, 15)
- James Redwood – orchestral arrangements (tracks 1, 15)
- Snoop Dogg – vocals (track 2)
- Gabriel Manuals Wallace – additional drums (tracks 2, 4, 6, 9, 12, 16)
- Hypnotic Brass Ensemble – additional brass (tracks 2, 12)
- Bashy – vocals (track 3)
- Kano – vocals (track 3)
- National Orchestra for Arabic Music – orchestra (track 3)
- Essam Rafea – conducting, orchestral arrangements (track 3)
- Mos Def – vocals (tracks 5, 12)
- Bobby Womack – vocals (tracks 5, 15)
- De La Soul – vocals (track 6)
- Gruff Rhys – vocals, additional guitar (track 6)
- Yukimi Nagano – vocals (tracks 7, 14)
- Håkan Wirenstrand – additional keyboards (tracks 7, 14)
- Fredrik Wallin – additional keyboards (tracks 7, 14)
- Simon Tong – additional guitar (tracks 7–8, 15)
- Mark E. Smith – vocals (track 8)
- Lou Reed – vocals, additional guitar (track 9)
- The Purple, the People, the Plastic Eating People (Note: The Purple, the People, the Plastic Eating People consist of Wayne Hernedez, Janet Ramus, Wendi Rose, John Gibbons, Ladonna Harley-Peters, Sharlene Hector, Lucy Randell, Marion Powell, The Bullitts, Yvonne Stevens and Gruff Rhys.) – choir (tracks 9, 16)
- Mick Jones – additional guitar (track 13)
- Paul Simonon – additional bass
- David Coulter – additional Jew's harp (track 16)
- Stephen Sedgwick – programming

=== Technical ===
- Gorillaz – production
- Jason Cox – recording, mixing
- Stephen Sedgwick – recording
- Josh Shultz – recording (track 2)
- Chris Jackson – recording (track 2)
- Ted Chung – recording (track 2)
- Michael Makowski – recording assistance (tracks 5, 9, 12)
- Howie Weinberg – mastering

=== Artwork ===
- J.C. Hewlett – artwork, design
- Zombie Flesh Eaters – artwork, design

== Charts ==
=== Weekly charts ===
2010 weekly chart performance
Chart (2010)	Peak position
Australian Albums (ARIA)	1
Australian Urban Albums (ARIA)	1
Austrian Albums (Ö3 Austria)	1
Belgian Albums (Ultratop Flanders)	1
Belgian Albums (Ultratop Wallonia)	2
Canadian Albums (Billboard)	3
Croatian Albums (HDU)	25
Czech Albums (ČNS IFPI)	6
Danish Albums (Hitlisten)	1
Dutch Albums (Album Top 100)	8
European Albums (Billboard)	1
Finnish Albums (Suomen virallinen lista)	37
French Albums (SNEP)	2
German Albums (Offizielle Top 100)	3
Greek Albums (IFPI)	3
Icelandic Albums (Tónlist)	8
Irish Albums (IRMA)	4
Italian Albums (FIMI)	12
Japan Hot Albums (Billboard Japan)	22
Japanese Albums (Oricon)	17
Japanese International Albums (Oricon)	7
Mexican Albums (Top 100 Mexico)	10
New Zealand Albums (RMNZ)	4
Norwegian Albums (VG-lista)	6
Polish Albums (ZPAV)	7
Portuguese Albums (AFP)	4
Russian Albums (2M)	11
Scottish Albums (Official Charts)	4
South Korean Albums (Circle)	94
South Korean International Albums (Circle)	6
Spanish Albums (Promusicae)	24
Swedish Albums (Sverigetopplistan)	10
Swiss Albums (Romandie)	2
Swiss Albums (Schweizer Hitparade)	2
UK Albums (Official Charts)	2
UK Dance Albums (Official Charts)	1
US Billboard 200	2
US Top Alternative Albums (Billboard)	1
US Top Rock Albums (Billboard)	1
US Indie Store Album Sales (Billboard)	2

2016 weekly chart performance
Chart (2016)	Peak position
US Top Catalog Albums (Billboard)	45

2017 weekly chart performance
Chart (2017)	Peak position
US Vinyl Albums (Billboard)	18

2026 weekly chart performance
Chart (2026)	Peak position
Croatian International Albums (HDU)	9

=== Year-end charts ===
2010 year-end chart performance
Chart (2010)	Position
Australian Albums (ARIA)	65
Australian Urban Albums (ARIA)	10
Belgian Albums (Ultratop Flanders)	45
Belgian Alternative Albums (Ultratop Flanders)	20
Belgian Albums (Ultratop Wallonia)	60
Danish Albums (Hitlisten)	71
Dutch Albums (Album Top 100)	87
European Albums (Billboard)	30
French Albums (SNEP)	56
Russian Albums (2M)	122
Swiss Albums (Schweizer Hitparade)	38
UK Albums (OCC)	40
US Billboard 200	89
US Top Alternative Albums (Billboard)	17
US Top Rock Albums (Billboard)	22

2018 year-end chart performance
Chart (2018)	Position
Mexican Albums (Top 100 Mexico)	92

== Certifications ==
Certifications
Region	Certification	Certified units/sales
Australia (ARIA)	Gold	35,000^{^}
Belgium (BRMA)	Gold	15,000^{*}
Canada (Music Canada)	Gold	40,000^{^}
Denmark (IFPI Danmark)	2× Platinum	60,000^{^}
France (SNEP)	Platinum	100,000^{*}
Germany (BVMI)	Gold	100,000^{‡}
Ireland (IRMA)	Gold	7,500^{^}
Italy (FIMI)	Gold	25,000^{‡}
New Zealand (RMNZ)	Platinum	15,000^{‡}
United Kingdom (BPI)	Platinum	345,223
^{*} Sales figures based on certification alone.^{^} Shipments figures based on certification alone.^{‡} Sales+streaming figures based on certification alone.

== Release history ==
Release dates
Date	Country
3 March 2010	Japan
5 March 2010	Australia
5 March 2010	Germany
5 March 2010	Ireland
8 March 2010	New Zealand
8 March 2010	Norway
8 March 2010	Sweden
8 March 2010	Denmark
8 March 2010	France
8 March 2010	United Kingdom
9 March 2010	South Africa
9 March 2010	Canada
9 March 2010	United States
9 March 2010	Mexico
11 March 2010	South Korea
12 March 2010	Brazil

Plastic Beach was released in a total of six editions, many of which contain a multitude of exclusive features. These are shown below:

	Standard edition	Experience edition	Japanese standard edition	Japanese experience edition	iTunes standard edition	iTunes deluxe edition	Vinyl edition
Standard 16 tracks	Yes	Yes	Yes	Yes	Yes	Yes	Yes
Bonus track: "Pirate's Progress"	No	No	Yes	Yes	No	Yes	No
Bonus track: "Three Hearts, Seven Seas, Twelve Moons"	No	No	No	No	No	Yes	No
Stickers and poster	No	No	Yes	Yes	No	No	No
Making of Plastic Beach DVD	No	Yes	No	Yes	No	No	No
Access to exclusive online content (Note: Content such as wallpapers and screensaver(s) offered may vary depending on the edition.)	No	Yes	No	Yes	No	Yes	No
Lyrics	No	No	Yes (physical booklet)	Yes (physical booklet)	Yes (digital)	Yes (digital)	No
Notebook	Partial	Yes	Partial	Yes	Partial	Yes	No
"Stylo" music video	No	No	No	Yes	Yes		
Access to iTunes LP features	No	No	No	No	No	Yes	No
T-shirt (Note: The T-shirt offered varies depending on the edition.)	Depends	Depends	No	No	No	No	No
