= Stylo (song) =

2010 single by Gorillaz featuring Bobby Womack and Mos Def

Single by Gorillaz featuring Bobby Womack and Mos Def

from the album Plastic Beach
- Released: 26 January 2010
- Recorded: 2009
- Studio: Studio 13 (London, UK); Chung King (New York City, US)
- Genre: Electro-funk; synth-pop; trip hop; hip-hop; techno
- Length: 4:30 (album version); 3:53 (radio edit)
- Label: Parlophone
- Songwriters: Damon Albarn; Mos Def; Bobby Womack
- Producer: Gorillaz

Gorillaz singles chronology
"Kids with Guns" / "El Mañana" (2006)	"Stylo" (2010)	"Superfast Jellyfish" (2010)

Mos Def singles chronology
"Casa Bey" (2009)	"Stylo" (2010)	"Just Begun" (2010)

Bobby Womack singles chronology
"It's a Man's Man's Man's World" (1995)	"Stylo" (2010)	"Please Forgive My Heart" (2012)

Audio sample
- file; help

Music video
- "Stylo" on YouTube

"Stylo" is the first single from British virtual band Gorillaz's third studio album Plastic Beach. The song features guest vocals from Bobby Womack and Mos Def. The single was released on 26 January 2010.

== Production ==
Bobby Womack knew nothing about Gorillaz and was initially unsure about the collaboration; however, his daughter liked Gorillaz and convinced him to do it. Womack was told to sing whatever was on his mind during the recording of "Stylo". "I was in there for an hour going crazy about love and politics, getting it off my chest", said Womack. After an hour of recording, Womack, a diabetic, started to pass out. He was sat down and given a banana, before waking up minutes later.

According to frontman Damon Albarn, Barry Gibb was originally going to be featured on the song, but due to an ear infection, had to back out.

== Music and lyrical content ==
Fictional band member Murdoc Niccals stated the following about "Stylo" in a track-by-track commentary:

This is a new sound for Gorillaz. An electro-ish 'crack funk' sound, with a little bit of politics and a lot of soul going down. With 'Stylo', I wanted the music to feel euphoric, whilst still putting across how precarious our tightly packed situation is now, worldwide. Where we're at as a species on this overpopulated planet ("Coming on to the Overload. Overload. Overload"). Bobby Womack's chorus, he just explodes into the track. How good is it to get Bobby Womack on the record? This was the first recording he's made in 15, 20 years, so what an honour. Bobby said he only returned to do this Gorillaz track because his granddaughter said Gorillaz were cool. Which is true. We are.

Reggae singer Eddy Grant claimed that this song bears similarities to his 1977 song "Time Warp" stating that "I am outraged that the Gorillaz have infringed the copyright of my song Time Warp, claiming their song Stylo to be an original composition" and within weeks of its release he began consulting lawyers.

== Release ==
A demo form of the track, then just a rough beat, was premiered on the Zane Lowe show on 14 January 2009, along with "Electric Shock" and "Broken". About a week before the official premiere, Parlophone president Miles Leonard described the song as "a dark, twisted track that sounds like the 'Saturday Night Fever' soundtrack on MDMA". The single was leaked onto the internet on 20 January 2010. Murdoc stated on his Twitter account, "A leak! A leak! Plastic Beach has sprung a leak! One of those Russian pirates has put a bullet hole on my island! My single's leaked! 'STYLO!'" He later added, "If anyone's going to leak my single, it'll be me!" The song's official premiere was on NME Radio that same day, shortly followed by its addition onto the Gorillaz official website. Gorillaz manager Chris Morrison said of the leak, "I just think that illegal downloading and pirating could be stopped, without a doubt. We have to take the gloves off and say it has to be stopped." On 26 January 2010 "Stylo" was released for digital download on iTunes. When the video was released, it received regular airplay on MTV and Viva. However, the video no longer received significant airplay after failing to make the Top 100 in the UK. The song was performed on the 22 April 2010 episode of The Colbert Report by members of the band. "Stylo" is a playable song in DJ Hero 2.

== Reception ==
"Stylo" was met with mainly positive reviews, as well as noticed as one of the key points of the album. Pitchfork gave it a 7 out of 10, saying "There's not a Gorillaz song that can trace its lineage to one geographic place, and "Stylo" feels drawn from the time when people thought hip-hop might turn the Bronx into a borderless musical melting pot."

Rolling Stone gave the song a positive 4/5 star review.

It charted on the "bubbling under" chart of the Billboard Hot 100 at number 103. It was the first Gorillaz song to reach any Japanese chart, rising to number eight on the Japan Hot 100. It was also successful in Mexico where it reached number 7 on the Ingles Airplay chart. In other countries, it was near the bottom or middle of the chart.

The song reached number 78 on the Triple J Hottest 100, 2010.

In February 2011, music video blog Yes, We've Got a Video! ranked the song's music video at number eight in their top 30 videos of 2010. The video was praised as "awesome" and "thrilling".

== Live performances ==
"Stylo" was performed live throughout the Escape to Plastic Beach world tour. Bobby Womack toured alongside Gorillaz for the duration of the tour, with Mos Def appearing for select dates. Rapper Bootie Brown, who had previously collaborated with Gorillaz on their single "Dirty Harry", frequently performed Mos Def's verses in his absence.

For the Humanz Tour and the Now Now Tour, the late Bobby Womack's verses were performed by Peven Everett, who featured in the Gorillaz single "Strobelite".

== Music video ==
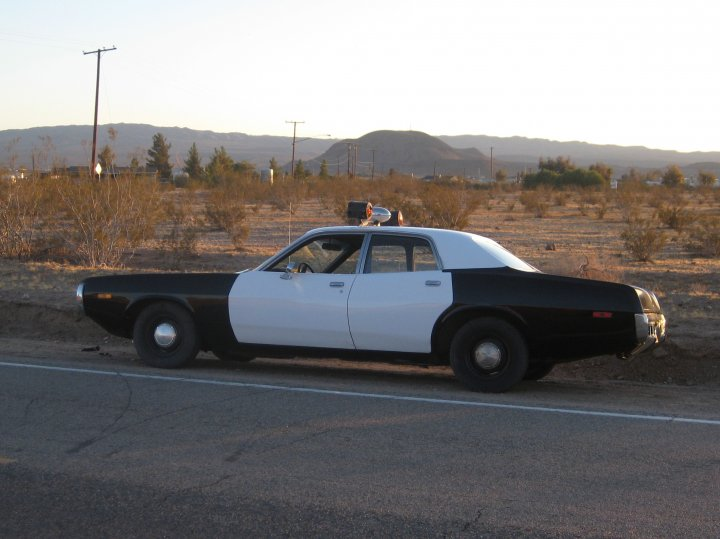
Stylo police car on location at Calico, California

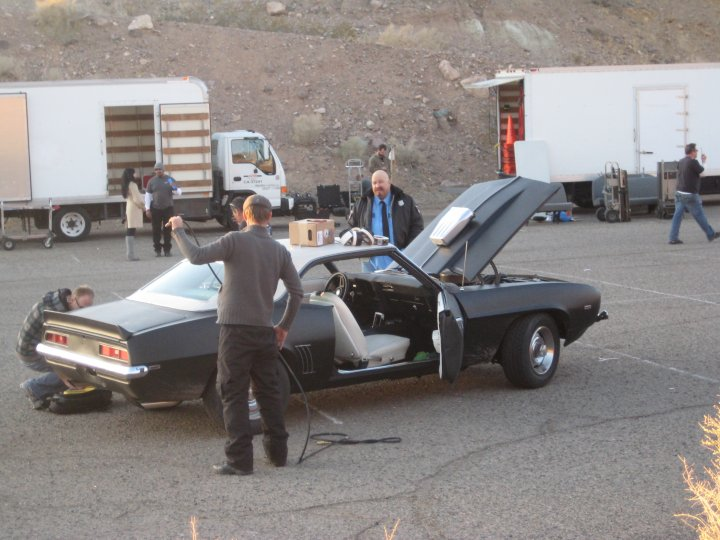
Stylo hero car on location at Calico, California

On 14 December 2009, California-based newspaper Desert Dispatch reported that a Gorillaz video shoot had taken place on 12 December in Calico, a ghost town in San Bernardino County, California. A representative from the production company said the video had a Mad Max theme. The first preview of the video was a set of animated storyboards that were shown in a press-only Plastic Beach exhibition in London. On 15 February 2010 Murdoc made a series of posts in Twitter about the upcoming video before releasing a trailer for it. The posts described him, Cyborg Noodle, and 2-D being chased through a Californian desert by an antagonist referred to only as "HIM". A second trailer was released on 27 February, revealing the animation style to be 3D CGI, a first for the band. Babelgum was expected to premiere the video on February. The premiere took place on September 7, 2010, on the official Gorillaz YouTube page.

The video was nominated at the 53rd Annual Grammy Awards in the category of Best Short Form Music Video. The ceremony took place on 13 February 2011. The video lost to Lady Gaga's "Bad Romance".

=== Synopsis ===
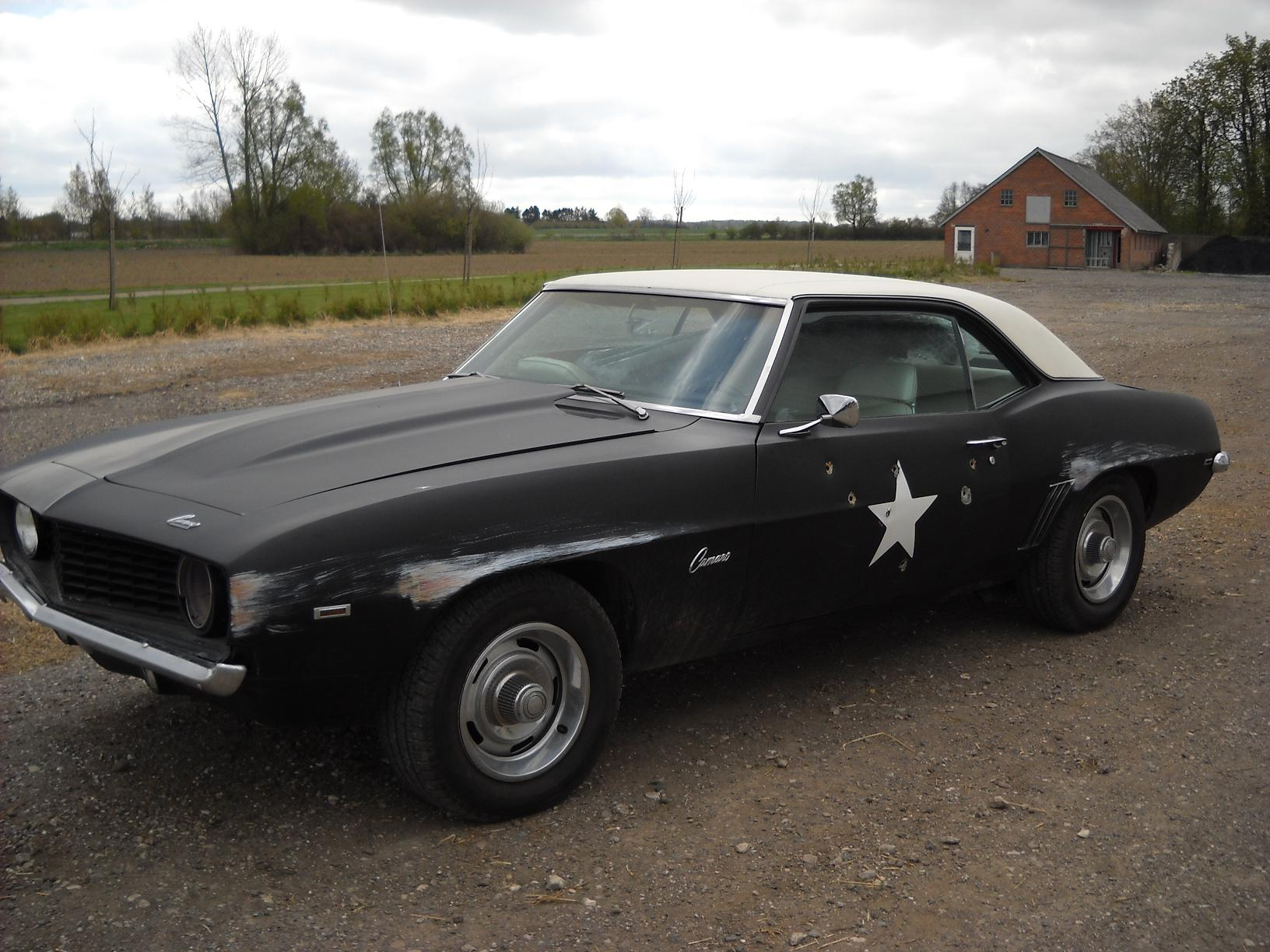
Jakob Klug's original 69 Stylo Camaro, Denmark

The music video depicts Murdoc, 2-D, and Cyborg Noodle speeding down a Californian desert highway in a 1969 Chevrolet Camaro with the word "Stylo" on the front grille. A policeman (played by Jason Nott) pursues the band in a Dodge Coronet police car; Cyborg Noodle opens fire at the police car, sending it careening off the road. Bruce Willis then appears, chasing the band in a red 1968 Chevrolet El Camino as an eerie black fog appears in the sky. Cyborg Noodle suddenly malfunctions and collapses in the passenger seat. As Willis chases the Gorillaz, the policeman crawls towards his spilled box of doughnuts, but before he can reach it, a shadowy figure appears out of the earth and envelops him in a cloud of dark vapor. Eventually, the Camaro runs off the highway and into the ocean, where it turns into a shark-shaped submarine and swims out of view.

The video was directed by Jamie Hewlett and produced by Cara Speller. The live action was created through HSI Productions in Los Angeles and the animation by Passion Pictures in London.

== Track listing ==
- Promotional CD single
1. "Stylo" (radio edit) – 3:53
2. "Stylo" (album version) – 4:30
3. "Stylo" (instrumental) – 4:30
- Promotional CD single – remixes
1. "Stylo" (Labrinth SNES Remix) (featuring Tinie Tempah) – 4:15
2. "Stylo" (Alex Metric Remix) – 6:15
3. "Stylo" (DJ Kofi Remix) – 3:44
4. "Stylo" (Chiddy Bang Remix) – 3:36
- 10" vinyl
1. "Stylo" (radio edit) – 3:53
2. "Stylo" (instrumental) – 4:30
- 12" vinyl

A1. "Stylo" (radio edit) – 3:53
A2. "Stylo" (Labrinth SNES Remix) (featuring Tinie Tempah) – 4:15
A3. "Stylo" (Tenkah Remix) – 4:48
A4. "Stylo" (Alex Metric Remix) – 6:15
A5. "Stylo" (Chiddy Bang Remix) – 3:36
A6. "Stylo" (Death Metal Disco Scene Remix) – 7:53
B1. "Stylo" (instrumental) – 4:30
B2. "Stylo" (Annie Mac Minimix) – 5:05
B3. "Stylo" (DJ Kofi Remix) – 3:44
B4. "Stylo" (Yuksek Remix) – 5:07
B5. "Stylo" (Tong and Rogers Wonderland Mix) – 4:12
B6. "Stylo" (Louis La Roche 'Better Late Than Never' Remix) – 3:28

== Personnel ==
- Damon Albarn – vocals, keyboards
- Mos Def – vocals
- Bobby Womack – vocals
- Stephen Sedgwick – programming, recording
- Jason Cox – mixing, recording
- Howie Weinberg – mastering
- Michael Makowski – recording assistance

== Charts ==
Weekly chart performance for "Stylo"
Chart (2010)	Peak position
Australia (ARIA)	48
Austria (Ö3 Austria Top 40)	40
Belgium (Ultratop 50 Flanders)	31
Belgium (Ultratop 50 Wallonia)	25
Canada Rock (Billboard)	42
Denmark (Tracklisten)	20
Mexico Ingles Airplay (Billboard)	7
Netherlands (Single Top 100)	56
Japan Hot 100 (Billboard)	8
Switzerland (Schweizer Hitparade)	56
US Bubbling Under Hot 100	3
US Alternative Airplay (Billboard)	24
US Hot Rock Songs (Billboard)	39
US Rock Airplay (Billboard)	39
US Rock Digital Song Sales (Billboard)	12

Annual chart rankings for "Stylo"
Chart (2010)	Rank
Japan Adult Contemporary (Billboard)	99
