= Humanz Tour =

2017–18 concert tour by Gorillaz

- Tour by Gorillaz
- Poster for the November 2017 Paris shows
- Location: Asia; Europe; Latin America; North America
- Associated album: Humanz
- Start date: 8 July 2017
- End date: 30 March 2018
- Legs: 6
- No. of shows: 53
- Supporting acts: Atlas; Danny Brown; DRAM; Hypnotic Brass Ensemble; Juana Molina; Kelela; Little Simz; Remi Kabaka; Vince Staples

Gorillaz concert chronology
- Escape to Plastic Beach Tour (2010); Humanz Tour (2017–2018); The Now Now Tour (2018)

The Humanz Tour was a concert tour by the British alternative rock virtual band Gorillaz, in support of their fifth studio album Humanz.

== Visuals ==
Described as "a totally immersive interactive experience with the audience" by frontman Damon Albarn, the Humanz Tour utilized a large screen behind the band to project music videos and visuals alongside live music, much like the band's previous tours. Humanz collaborators who were unable to present themselves for the concerts were represented by pre-recorded video, a technique previously utilized in Demon Days Live. The set and production for the tour was designed by London-based design studio Block9.

== Set list ==
The following set list was obtained from the concert held at the Huntington Bank Pavilion in Chicago, on 8 July 2017. It is not a representation of all shows on the tour.

1. "Ascension" (featuring Vince Staples)
2. "Last Living Souls"
3. "Saturnz Barz"
4. "Charger"
5. "Rhinestone Eyes"
6. "Sex Murder Party" (featuring Jamie Principle and Zebra Katz)
7. "She's My Collar"
8. "Busted and Blue"
9. "El Mañana"
10. "Carnival" (featuring Anthony Hamilton)
11. "Broken" (featuring Hypnotic Brass Ensemble)
12. "Andromeda"
13. "Strobelite" (featuring Peven Everett)
14. "Out of Body" (featuring Zebra Katz and Imani Vonshà)
15. "Garage Palace" (featuring Little Simz)
16. "We Got the Power" (featuring Noel Gallagher, Jehnny Beth and Little Simz)

Encore

17. "Stylo" (featuring Peven Everett)
18. "Kids with Guns"
19. "Clint Eastwood" (featuring Del the Funky Homosapien)
20. "Don't Get Lost in Heaven"
21. "Demon Days"

== Tour dates ==
List of 2017 concerts
Date	City	Country	Venue	Opening act	Ref.
8 July	Chicago	United States	Huntington Bank Pavilion	Little Simz; Hypnotic Brass Ensemble	
10 July	Toronto	Canada	Air Canada Centre	Vince Staples	
12 July	Boston	United States	Blue Hills Bank Pavilion	Vince Staples	
13 July	Philadelphia	United States	Penn's Landing	Vince Staples	
15 July (Note: The show on 15 July 2017 in Quebec City was part of the Festival d'été de Québec.)	Quebec City	Canada	Plains of Abraham	Kelela; Danny Brown	
17 July	Columbia (Note: Labeled as Washington, D.C. in promotional material)	United States	Merriweather Post Pavilion	Vince Staples; Danny Brown	
28 July (Note: The show on 28 July 2017 in Yuzawa was part of the Fuji Rock Festival.)	Yuzawa	Japan	Naeba Ski Resort	—N/a	
30 July (Note: The show on 30 July 2017 in Icheon was part of the Jisan Valley Rock Festival.)	Icheon	South Korea	Jisan Forest Resort	—N/a	
11 August (Note: The show on 11 August 2017 in San Francisco was part of the Outside Lands Music and Arts Festival.)	San Francisco	United States	Golden Gate Park	—N/a	
16 September (Note: The show on 16 September 2017 in New York City was part of The Meadows Music & Arts Festival.)	New York City	United States	Citi Field	—N/a	
18 September	Detroit	United States	Fox Theatre	Vince Staples	
20 September	Saint Paul (Note: Labeled as Minneapolis in promotional material)	United States	Roy Wilkins Auditorium	Vince Staples; Danny Brown	
22 September	Kansas City	United States	Sprint Center	Vince Staples; Danny Brown	
24 September (Note: The show on 24 September 2017 in Las Vegas was part of the Life Is Beautiful Music & Art Festival.)	Las Vegas	United States	Downtown Las Vegas	—N/a	
26 September	Morrison (Note: Labeled as Denver in promotional material)	United States	Red Rocks Amphitheatre	Vince Staples	
30 September	Seattle	United States	KeyArena	Vince Staples	
4 October	San Francisco	United States	Bill Graham Civic Auditorium	Vince Staples; Danny Brown	
5 October	Inglewood (Note: Labeled as Los Angeles in promotional material)	United States	The Forum	Vince Staples	
8 October (Note: The shows on 8 and 15 October 2017 in Austin were part of the Austin City Limits Music Festival.)	Austin	United States	Zilker Park	—N/a	
11 October	Duluth (Note: Labeled as Atlanta in promotional material)	United States	Infinite Energy Arena	DRAM	
13 October (Note: The show on 13 October 2017 in Miami was part of the III Points Music, Art, and Technology Festival.)	Miami	United States	Mana Wynwood Convention Center	—N/a	
15 October	Austin	United States	Zilker Park	—N/a	
27 October (Note: The show on 27 October 2017 in Dubai was part of the Fiesta De Los Muertos Festival.)	Dubai	United Arab Emirates	Autism Rocks Arena	—N/a	
1 November	Esch-sur-Alzette	Luxembourg	Rockhal	Little Simz	
2 November	Vienna	Austria	Wiener Stadthalle	Little Simz	
4 November	Copenhagen	Denmark	Royal Arena	Little Simz	
5 November	Oslo	Norway	Oslo Spektrum	Little Simz	
6 November	Stockholm	Sweden	Hovet	Little Simz	
8 November	Zürich	Switzerland	Samsung Hall	Little Simz	
9 November	Geneva	Switzerland	SEG Geneva Arena	Little Simz	
11 November	Munich	Germany	Kulturhalle Zenith	Little Simz	
13 November	Budapest	Hungary	László Papp Budapest Sportaréna	Remi Kabaka	
14 November	Prague	Czech Republic	O_{2} Arena	Remi Kabaka	
17 November	Berlin	Germany	Max-Schmeling-Halle	Little Simz	
18 November	Düsseldorf	Germany	Mitsubishi Electric Halle	Little Simz	
19 November	Hamburg	Germany	Alsterdorfer Sporthalle	Little Simz	
21 November	Amsterdam	Netherlands	Ziggo Dome	Little Simz	
22 November	Brussels	Belgium	Forest National	Little Simz	
24 November	Paris	France	Zénith Paris	Little Simz	
25 November	Paris	France	Zénith Paris	Little Simz	
27 November	Brighton	England	Brighton Centre	Little Simz	
29 November	Glasgow	Scotland	The SSE Hydro	Remi Kabaka	
1 December	Manchester	England	Manchester Arena	Little Simz	
2 December	Birmingham	England	Arena Birmingham	Little Simz	
4 December	London	England	The O_{2} Arena	Little Simz	
5 December	London	England	The O_{2} Arena	Little Simz	
13 December (Note: The show on 13 December 2017 in Montevideo was part of the Primavera 0 Festival.)	Montevideo	Uruguay	Velódromo Municipal de Montevideo	Juana Molina; Atlas	
16 December (Note: The show on 16 December 2017 in Buenos Aires was part of the BUE Festival.)	Buenos Aires	Argentina	Tecnópolis	—N/a	

List of 2018 concerts
Date	City	Country	Venue	Opening act	Ref.
18 March (Note: The show on 18 March 2018 in Mexico City was part of the Vive Latino festival.)	Mexico City	Mexico	Foro Sol	—N/a	
20 March	Santiago	Chile	Movistar Arena	—N/a	
24 March (Note: The show on 24 March 2018 in Bogotá was part of the Estéreo Picnic Festival.)	Bogotá	Colombia	Parque Deportivo de Bogotá	—N/a	
27 March (Note: The show on 27 March 2018 in Asunción was part of the Asunciónico festival.)	Asunción	Paraguay	Espacio Idesa	—N/a	
30 March	São Paulo	Brazil	Jockey Club de São Paulo	—N/a	

=== Box office score data ===
Venue	City	Tickets sold / available	Gross revenue	Ref.
Air Canada Centre	Toronto	12,640 / 12,640 (100%)	$852,557	
Blue Hills Bank Pavilion	Boston	4,777 / 4,945 (96%)	$400,401	
Penn's Landing	Philadelphia	9,000 / 9,358 (96%)	$400,950	
Bill Graham Civic Auditorium	San Francisco	8,500 / 8,500 (100%)	$552,500	
The Forum	Inglewood	13,275 / 13,275 (100%)	$1,000,191	
The SSE Hydro	Glasgow	10,555 / 10,900 (96%)	$628,387	
The O2 Arena	London	27,549 / 29,787 (92%)	$2,072,630	
Jockey Club de São Paulo	São Paulo	10,822 / 13,000 (83%)	$672,797	

== Personnel ==
- Damon Albarn – lead vocals, keyboards, piano, acoustic guitar, electric guitar, melodica, keytar
- Mike Smith – keyboards, backing vocals
- Jeff Wootton – lead guitar
- Seye Adelekan – bass guitar, ukulele, acoustic guitar, backing vocals
- Gabriel Wallace – drums, percussion
- Jesse Hackett – keyboards
- Karl Vanden Bossche – drums, percussion
- Angel Silvera – backing vocals
- Petra Luke – backing vocals, vocals on "Dare"
- Rebecca Freckleton – backing vocals, vocals on "Dare"
- Michelle Ndegwa – backing vocals, vocals on "Out of Body" and "Kids with Guns"
- Matthew Allen – backing vocals
- Marcus Anthony Johnson – backing vocals (Select dates only)
- Adeleye Omotayo – backing vocals (Select dates only)
- Demon Strings – strings (Birmingham and London shows only)

Guest collaborators and additional musicians

- Jamie Principle – vocals on "Sex Murder Party" and "Hollywood" (Select dates only)
- Peven Everett – vocals on "Strobelite" and "Stylo" (Select dates only)
- Vince Staples – vocals on "Ascension" and "Clint Eastwood" (Select dates only)
- Zebra Katz – vocals on "Sex Murder Party" and "Out of Body" (Select dates only)
- Kilo Kish – vocals on "19-2000" and "Out of Body" (Select dates only)
- Little Simz – vocals on "Garage Palace", "We Got the Power" and "Clint Eastwood" (Select dates only)
- Anthony Hamilton – vocals on "Carnival" (Chicago and first San Francisco show only)
- Hypnotic Brass Ensemble – brass on "Broken" and "Sweepstakes" (Chicago and London shows only)
- Pusha T – vocals on "Let Me Out" (Select dates only)
- Del the Funky Homosapien – vocals on "Clint Eastwood" (Select dates only)
- De La Soul – vocals on "Momentz", "Superfast Jellyfish" and "Feel Good Inc." (Select dates only)
- Bootie Brown – vocals on "Dirty Harry" and "Stylo" (Select dates only)
- Carly Simon – vocals on "Ticker Tape" (Boston only)
- Kali Uchis – vocals on "She's My Collar" (Select dates only)
- Kelela – vocals on "Busted and Blue" and "Submission" (Quebec City only)
- Danny Brown – rap on "Submission" (Select dates only)
- Yukimi Nagano – vocals on "Empire Ants" (First San Francisco show only)
- DRAM – vocals on "Andromeda" and "We Got the Power" (Select dates only)
- Jehnny Beth – vocals on "We Got the Power" (Select dates only)
- Mos Def – vocals on "Stylo" and "Sweepstakes" (New York City and London shows only)
- Eslam Jawaad – vocals on "Clint Eastwood" (Dubai only)
- Malikah Lynn – vocals on "Clint Eastwood" (Dubai only)
- Faia Younan – vocals on "Busted and Blue" (Dubai only)
- Popcaan – vocals on "Saturnz Barz" (Paris shows only)
- Pauline Black – vocals on "Charger" - Alternate version (Select dates only)
- Gruff Rhys – vocals and guitar on "Superfast Jellyfish" (London shows only)
- Noel Gallagher – vocals and guitar on "We Got the Power" (London shows only)
- Graham Coxon – guitar on "We Got the Power" (London shows only)
- Roses Gabor – vocals on "Dare" (London shows only)
- Shaun Ryder – vocals on "Dare" (London shows only)
