= The Mountain Tour =

2026–2027 concert tour by Gorillaz

- Tour by Gorillaz
- Promotional poster for North American tour dates
- Location: Asia; Europe; Latin America; North America
- Associated album: The Mountain
- Start date: 20 March 2026
- End date: 31 January 2027
- Legs: 5
- No. of shows: 71
- Supporting acts: Deltron 3030; Little Simz; Luisa Almaguer; Nave Ascensor; Omar Souleyman; Sparks; Trueno

Gorillaz concert chronology
- World Tour 2022 (2022); The Mountain Tour (2026–2027)

The Mountain Tour is a concert tour by the British alternative rock virtual band Gorillaz, in support of their ninth studio album The Mountain.

== Background and promotion ==
Gorillaz have performed three gigs at Copper Box Arena in London to perform their first three studio albums in entirety between late August and early September 2025. As well, the group has performed a fourth show at the venue under the title "Mystery Show", where they played a new material with several guests. In this one, the attendees have to lock their phones away to prevent any leaks.

On 11 September 2025, the band announced the title of the new album, The Mountain, and released its first single, "The Happy Dictator", featuring Sparks. On the same day, the first dates of the tour were announced in UK and Ireland, including the first Gorillaz stadium concert as a headliner act at Tottenham Hotspur Stadium in London on 20 June 2026. Due to high demand, extra dates in Manchester and Dublin were added later. Omar Souleyman and Trueno supported the band in the UK and Ireland dates between March and April, while Trueno and Sparks have supported Gorillaz at the London gig in June.

Later, dates at European festivals were announced, including Primavera Sound in Barcelona, We Love Green in Paris, Roskilde in Denmark, Rock Werchter in Belgium and many others.

On 27 February 2026, the same day of the worldwide release of the album, the first dates for the Latin American leg were announced. Later, other dates in the region were announced, including festivals such as Corona Capital in Mexico and both Primavera Sound editions in Brazil and Argentina.

On 3 March 2026, the band revealed the dates for the North American leg, with support of Deltron 3030 and Little Simz.

On 9 April 2026, Gorillaz announced their debut in India, where The Mountain was based, with two dates in Bengaluru and Mumbai. On 10 September 2026, a third date in Guwahati was also confirmed.

== Setlist ==
The following information is obtained from the concert held at the Co-op Live in Manchester, on 20 March 2026. It is not a representation of all shows of the tour.

1. "The Mountain"
2. "The Happy Dictator"
3. "Tranz"
4. "Tomorrow Comes Today"
5. "19-2000"
6. "Rhinestone Eyes"
7. "The God of Lying" (featuring Joe Talbot)
8. "The Moon Cave"
9. "El Mañana"
10. "On Melancholy Hill"
11. "The Empty Dream Machine"
12. "New Genius (Brother)"
13. "Saturnz Barz"
14. "Delirium"
15. "Andromeda"
16. "Stylo" (featuring Yasiin Bey)
17. "Damascus" (featuring Omar Souleyman and Yasiin Bey)
18. "Dirty Harry" (featuring Bootie Brown)
19. "Casablanca"
20. "The Sad God"
  Encore
21. "The Hardest Thing"
22. "Orange County" (featuring Kara Jackson)
23. "Feel Good Inc." (featuring Posdnuos)
24. "Clint Eastwood"

== Tour dates ==
List of 2026 concerts
Date (2026)	City	Country	Venue
20 March	Manchester	England	Co-op Live
21 March	Manchester	England	Co-op Live
22 March	Birmingham	England	bp pulse LIVE
24 March	Glasgow	Scotland	OVO Hydro
25 March	Leeds	England	First Direct Bank Arena
27 March	Cardiff	Wales	Utilita Arena Cardiff
28 March	Nottingham	England	Motorpoint Arena
29 March	Liverpool	England	M&S Bank Arena
31 March	Belfast	Northern Ireland	The SSE Arena
1 April	Dublin	Ireland	3Arena
2 April	Dublin	Ireland	3Arena
5 June (Note: The show in 5 June 2026 in Paris was part of We Love Green)	Paris	France	Bois de Vincennes
6 June (Note: The show in 6 June 2026 in Barcelona was part of Primavera Sound)	Barcelona	Spain	Parc del Fòrum
10 June (Note: The show in 10 June 2026 in Hradec Králové was part of Rock for People)	Hradec Králové	Czech Republic	Festivalpark
12 June (Note: The show in 12 June 2026 in Porto was part of Primavera Sound Porto)	Porto	Portugal	Parque da Cidade
14 June (Note: The show in 14 June 2026 in Hilvarenbeek was part of Best Kept Secret)	Hilvarenbeek	Netherlands	Beekse Bergen Lake Resort
20 June	London	England	Tottenham Hotspur Stadium
23 June (Note: The show in 23 June 2026 in Zagreb was part of INmusic Festival)	Zagreb	Croatia	Jarun Lake
25 June (Note: The show in 25 June 2026 in Kallithea was part of Release Athens)	Kallithea	Greece	Plateia Nerou
27 June (Note: The show in 27 June 2026 in Lido di Camaiore was part of La Prima Estate)	Lido di Camaiore	Italy	Bussola Domani Park
2 July (Note: The show in 2 July 2026 in Roskilde was part of Roskilde Festival)	Roskilde	Denmark	Roskilde Dyreskueplads
4 July (Note: The show in 4 July 2026 in Werchter was part of Rock Werchter)	Werchter	Belgium	Festivalpark
5 July	Luxembourg	Luxembourg	Luxexpo Open-Air
9 July (Note: The show in 9 July 2026 in Trenčín was part of Pohoda Festival)	Trenčín	Slovakia	Trenčín Airport
11 July (Note: The show in 11 July 2026 in Aix-les-Bains was part of Musilac Music Festival)	Aix-les-Bains	France	Lac du Bourget
14 July (Note: The shows in 14 July and 16 July 2026 in Istanbul were part of Pozitif Vibrations)	Istanbul	Turkey	Parkorman
16 July	Istanbul	Turkey	Parkorman
18 July (Note: The show in 18 July 2026 in Plovdiv was part of Phillgood Festival)	Plovdiv	Bulgaria	Rowing Canal
23 July (Note: The show on 23 July 2026 in Nyon was part of Paléo Festival.)	Nyon	Switzerland	Plaine de l'Asse
25 July	Trieste	Italy	Piazza Unità d'Italia
13 August (Note: The show in 13 August 2026 in Poznań was part of Bittersweet Festival)	Poznań	Poland	Citadel Park
15 August (Note: The show in 15 August 2026 in Poznań was part of Way Out West Festival)	Gothenburg	Sweden	Slottsskogen
22 August (Note: The show in 22 August 2026 in Almaty was part of Park Live Festival)	Almaty	Kazakhstan	Pervomaisky Ponds
29 August (Note: The show in 29 August 2026 in Stradbally was part of Electric Picnic)	Stradbally	Ireland	Stradbally Hall
17 September	Orlando	United States	Kia Center
18 September	Miami	United States	Kaseya Center
20 September (Note: The show in 20 September 2026 in Atlanta was part of Shaky Knees Music Festival)	Atlanta	United States	Piedmont Park
23 September	Charlotte	United States	Spectrum Center
26 September	Washington, D.C.	United States	Capital One Arena
27 September	Camden	United States	Freedom Mortgage Pavilion
29 September	New York City	United States	Madison Square Garden
1 October	Boston	United States	TD Garden
3 October	Montreal	Canada	Bell Centre
4 October	Toronto	Canada	Scotiabank Arena
6 October	Cleveland	United States	Rocket Arena
7 October	Detroit	United States	Little Caesars Arena
8 October	Chicago	United States	United Center
15 October	Austin	United States	Moody Center
16 October	Fort Worth	United States	Dickies Arena
18 October	Denver	United States	Ball Arena
20 October	Salt Lake City	United States	Delta Center
23 October	Phoenix	United States	Mortgage Matchup Center
24 October	Inglewood (Note: Labeled as Los Angeles in promotional material)	United States	Kia Forum
25 October	San Diego	United States	Pechanga Arena
28 October	Oakland	United States	Oakland Arena
30 October	Portland	United States	Moda Center
31 October	Seattle	United States	Climate Pledge Arena
14 November	Alajuela (Note: Labeled as San José in promotional material)	Costa Rica	Parque Viva
17 November	Cota (Note: Labeled as Bogotá in promotional material)	Colombia	Coliseo MedPlus
20 November (Note: The show in 20 November 2026 in Mexico City is part of Corona Capital)	Mexico City	Mexico	Autódromo Hermanos Rodríguez
23 November (Note: The concert in Lima on 23 November 2026 was originally set to take place at the Arena 1 Park, but it was relocated due to the venue closing.)	Lima	Peru	Lurín Live
26 November	Córdoba	Argentina	Playón from Estadio Mario Alberto Kempes
28 November (Note: The show in 28 November 2026 in Buenos Aires is part of Primavera Sound Buenos Aires)	Buenos Aires	Argentina	Club Ciudad de Buenos Aires
1 December	Asunción	Paraguay	Jockey Club del Paraguay
4 December	Santiago	Chile	Estadio Bicentenario de La Florida
6 December (Note: The show in 6 December 2026 in São Paulo is part of Primavera Sound São Paulo)	São Paulo	Brazil	Autódromo de Interlagos
9 December	Zapopan (Note: Labeled as Guadalajara in promotional material)	Mexico	Coliseo GNP Seguros
11 December	Mexico City	Mexico	Palacio de los Deportes

List of 2027 concerts
Date (2027)	City	Country	Venue
23 January	Bengaluru	India	District Arena at Terraform
27 January	Mumbai	India	Jio World Garden
31 January	Guwahati	India	Indira Gandhi Athletic Stadium

== Live band ==
- Damon Albarn – lead vocals, keyboards, piano, acoustic guitar, electric guitar, melodica, keytar
- Mike Smith – keyboards, backing vocals
- Jeff Wootton – lead guitar
- Seye Adelekan – bass guitar, acoustic guitar, backing vocals
- Jaega Mckenna-Gordon – drums
- Ruth O'Mahony Brady – keyboards, piano on "Clint Eastwood"
- Karl Vanden Bossche – drums, percussion
- Angel Silvera – backing vocals
- Rebecca Freckleton – backing vocals
- Michelle Ndegwa – backing vocals, vocals on "Kids with Guns"
- J. Appiah – backing vocals

=== Guest collaborators and additional musicians ===
- 6lack – rap on "The Pink Phantom" (Atlanta only)
- Ajay Prasanna – flute
- Anoushka Shankar – sitar on "The Mountain", "The Moon Cave", "The Sad God" and "Orange County" (London and Gothenburg shows only)
- Asha Puthli – vocals on "The Moon Cave" (Select dates only)
- Ayaan Ali Bangash – percussion
- Bashy – rap on "White Flag" (London only)
- Black Thought – rap on "The Moon Cave", "The Sad God" and "November Has Come" (Select dates only)
- Bootie Brown – rap on "Dirty Harry", "Stylo" and "New Gold"
- D12 – rap on "911" (Detroit only)
- Danny Brown – rap on "Submission" (Detroit and Austin shows only)
- Del the Funky Homosapien – rap on "Clint Eastwood", "Rock the House", "Phoner to Arizona" and "Ghost Train" (North American leg only)
- DRAM – vocals on "Andromeda" (Select dates only)
- EarthGang – rap on "Opium" (Select dates only)
- Fatoumata Diawara – vocals on "Désolé" (Select dates only)
- Gruff Rhys – vocals on "Superfast Jellyfish" and "The Shadowy Light" (Cardiff and London shows only)
- Hypnotic Brass Ensemble – brass on "Broken", "Plastic Beach" and "Welcome to the World of the Plastic Beach" (New York City and Chicago shows only)
- Jamie Principle – vocals on "Hollywood" (Chicago and Inglewood shows only)
- Joe Talbot – vocals on "The God of Lying" (Select dates only)
- Johnny Marr – guitar on "Casablanca", "The Empty Dream Machine" and "Plastic Beach" (London and first Mexico City shows only)
- Kali Uchis – vocals on "She's My Collar" (Inglewood only)
- Kano – rap on "White Flag" (London only)
- Kara Jackson – vocals on "Orange County"
- Kid Koala – turntables (North American leg only)
- Leee John – vocals on "The Lost Chord" (Stradbally only)
- Little Simz – rap on "Garage Palace" (Select dates only)
- Luisa Almaguer – vocals on "Latin Simone (¿Qué Pasa Contigo?)" (Select dates only)
- Miho Hatori – vocals on "19-2000" and "Re-Hash" (New York City and Inglewood shows only)
- Moonchild Sanelly – vocals on "With Love to an Ex" (Select dates only)
- Omar Souleyman – vocals on "Damascus" (Select dates only)
- Paul Simonon – guitar on "Casablanca" and "Plastic Beach" (London only)
- Pauline Black – vocals on "Charger" (Select dates only)
- Peven Everett – vocals on "Strobelite" and "Stylo" (Chicago only)
- Popcaan – rap on "Saturnz Barz" (Select dates only)
- Pusha T – rap on "Let Me Out" (New York City only)
- Posdnuos – rap on "Feel Good Inc." and "Superfast Jellyfish" (Select dates only)
- Roses Gabor – vocals on "Dare" (London only)
- ScHoolboy Q – rap on "Pac-Man" (Inglewood only)
- Shaun Ryder – vocals on "Dare" (London only)
- Sparks – piano and vocals on "The Happy Dictator" (London and Inglewood shows only)
- Sweetie Irie – rap on "Clint Eastwood" (Select dates only)
- Trueno – rap on "The Manifesto" and "Clint Eastwood" (Select dates only)
- Yasiin Bey – rap on "Stylo and "Damascus" (Select dates only)
- Yukimi Nagano – vocals on "Empire Ants" and "To Binge" (Select dates only)
- Zanai Bhosle – vocals on "The Shadowy Light" (London only)
