= The Now Now Tour =

2018 concert tour by Gorillaz

- Tour by Gorillaz
- Promotional poster for North American tour dates
- Location: Asia; Europe; North America
- Associated album: The Now Now
- Start date: 1 June 2018
- End date: 24 October 2018
- Legs: 4
- No. of shows: 29
- Supporting acts: Bonobo; De La Soul; Hypnotic Brass Ensemble; The Internet; Jupiter & Okwess; Little Dragon; Little Simz; Oscar and the Wolf

Gorillaz concert chronology
- Humanz Tour (2017–2018); The Now Now Tour (2018); Song Machine Tour (2021)

The Now Now Tour was a concert tour by the British alternative rock virtual band Gorillaz, in support of their sixth studio album The Now Now.

== Set list ==
The following set list was obtained from the concert held in Toronto on 8 October 2018. It is not a representation of all shows on the tour.

1. "M1 A1" (with "Lil' Dub Chefin'" outro)
2. "Tranz"
3. "Last Living Souls"
4. "Rhinestone Eyes"
5. "Saturnz Barz"
6. "Tomorrow Comes Today"
7. "Sorcererz"
8. "Every Planet We Reach Is Dead"
9. "19-2000"
10. "Humility"
11. "Superfast Jellyfish" (featuring De La Soul)
12. "On Melancholy Hill"
13. "El Mañana"
14. "Fire Flies"
15. "Strobelite" (featuring Peven Everett)
16. "Andromeda"
17. "Hollywood" (featuring Jamie Principle, and Snoop Dogg via video)
18. "Stylo" (featuring Bootie Brown and Peven Everett)
19. "Magic City"
20. "Dirty Harry" (featuring Bootie Brown)
21. "Feel Good Inc." (featuring De La Soul)
22. "Souk Eye"
23. "Plastic Beach"

Encore

24. "Lake Zurich"
25. "Latin Simone" / "Latin Simone (¿Qué Pasa Contigo?)" (medley, featuring Ibrahim Ferrer via video)
26. "Kids with Guns"
27. "Clint Eastwood" (featuring Del tha Funkee Homosapien via video)
28. "Don't Get Lost in Heaven"
29. "Demon Days"

== Tour dates ==
List of 2018 concerts
Date	City	Country	Venue	Opening act
1 June (Note: The show on 1 June 2018 in Nuremberg was part of the Rock im Park festival.)	Nuremberg	Germany	Zeppelinfeld	—N/a
3 June (Note: The show on 3 June 2018 in Nürburg was part of the Rock am Ring festival.)	Nürburg	Germany	Nürburgring	—N/a
9 June	Dublin	Ireland	Malahide Castle	Little Simz; De La Soul; Hypnotic Brass Ensemble
15 June (Note: The show on 15 June 2018 in Barcelona was part of the Sónar festival.)	Barcelona	Spain	Fira de Barcelona	—N/a
21 June	Chiba	Japan	Makuhari Messe	—N/a
22 June	Tokyo	Japan	Zepp DiverCity	—N/a
5 July (Note: The show on 5 July 2018 in Werchter was part of the Rock Werchter festival.)	Werchter	Belgium	Werchterpark	—N/a
6 July (Note: The show on 6 July 2018 in Gdynia was part of the Open'er Festival.)	Gdynia	Poland	Gdynia-Kosakowo Airport	—N/a
7 July (Note: The show on 7 July 2018 in Roskilde was part of the Roskilde Festival.)	Roskilde	Denmark	Festivalpladsen	—N/a
11 July (Note: The show on 11 July 2018 in Bern was part of the Gurtenfestival.)	Bern	Switzerland	Gurten	—N/a
12 July (Note: The show on 12 July 2018 in Lucca was part of the Lucca Summer Festival.)	Lucca	Italy	Piazza Napoleone	—N/a
14 July (Note: The show on 14 July 2018 in Bilbao was part of the Bilbao BBK Live festival.)	Bilbao	Spain	Mount Cobetas	—N/a
19 July (Note: The show on 19 July 2018 in Nyon was part of the Paléo Festival.)	Nyon	Switzerland	Plaine de l'Asse	—N/a
21 July (Note: The show on 21 July 2018 in Carhaix was part of the Vieilles Charrues Festival.)	Carhaix	France	La Prairie de Kerampuilh	—N/a
22 July (Note: The show on 22 July 2018 in Paris was part of the Lollapalooza festival.)	Paris	France	Longchamp Racecourse	—N/a
25 July (Note: The show on 25 July 2018 in Kyiv was part of the U-Park Festival.)	Kyiv	Ukraine	People's Friendship Arch	—N/a
28 July (Note: The show on 28 July 2018 in Moscow was part of the Park Live Festival. This show wasn't finished due a constant thunderstorm.)	Moscow	Russia	Gorky Park	—N/a
9 August (Note: The show on 9 August 2018 in Budapest was part of the Sziget Festival.)	Budapest	Hungary	Hajógyári Island	Oscar and the Wolf; Bonobo
11 August (Note: The show on 11 August 2018 in Winchester was part of the Boomtown festival.)	Winchester	England	Matterley Estate Farm	—N/a
16 August (Note: The show on 16 August 2018 in Sankt Pölten was part of the FM4 Frequency Festival.)	Sankt Pölten	Austria	VAZ St. Pölten	—N/a
17 August (Note: The show on 17 August 2018 in Biddinghuizen was part of the Lowlands festival.)	Biddinghuizen	Netherlands	Walibi Holland	—N/a
8 October	Toronto	Canada	Scotiabank Arena	The Internet
9 October	Montreal	Canada	Bell Centre	The Internet
11 October	Philadelphia	United States	Wells Fargo Center	The Internet
13 October	Brooklyn	United States	Barclays Center	The Internet
14 October	Boston	United States	TD Garden	Little Dragon
16 October	Chicago	United States	United Center	The Internet
20 October (Note: The show on 20 October 2018 in Pico Rivera was part of the Demon Dayz Festival LA.)	Pico Rivera	United States	Pico Rivera Sports Arena	—N/a
24 October	Mexico City	Mexico	Palacio de los Deportes	Jupiter & Okwess

== Personnel ==
- Damon Albarn – lead vocals, keyboards, piano, acoustic guitar, electric guitar, melodica, keytar
- Mike Smith – keyboards, backing vocals
- Jeff Wootton – lead guitar
- Seye Adelekan – bass guitar, acoustic guitar, backing vocals
- Gabriel Wallace – drums, percussion
- Jesse Hackett – keyboards, additional percussion on "Latin Simone (¿Qué Pasa Contigo?)"
- Karl Vanden Bossche – drums, percussion
- Angel Silvera – backing vocals
- Petra Luke – backing vocals
- Rebecca Freckleton – backing vocals, vocals on "Sorcererz"
- Michelle Ndegwa – backing vocals, vocals on "Out of Body" and "Kids with Guns"
- Matthew Allen – backing vocals
- Adeleye Omotayo – backing vocals

Guest collaborators and additional musicians

- Jamie Principle – vocals on "Hollywood"
- Peven Everett – vocals on "Strobelite" and "Stylo" (Select dates only)
- De La Soul – vocals on "Superfast Jellyfish" and "Feel Good Inc." (Select dates only)
- Del the Funky Homosapien – vocals on "Clint Eastwood" (Select dates only)
- Bootie Brown – vocals on "Dirty Harry" and "Stylo" (Select dates only)
- Little Simz – vocals on "Garage Palace" and "We Got the Power" (Select dates only)
- Hypnotic Brass Ensemble – brass on "Broken" and "Sweepstakes" (Dublin and Pico Rivera only)
- Moonchild Sanelly – vocals on "Out of Body" (Roskilde only)
- Benjamin Clementine – vocals on "Hallelujah Money" (Bilbao only)
- Jehnny Beth – vocals on "We Got the Power" (Paris only)
- Noel Gallagher – vocals and guitar on "We Got the Power" (Paris only)
- Yukimi Nagano – vocals on "Empire Ants" and "To Binge" (Moscow and Boston only)
- Gruff Rhys – vocals and guitar on "Superfast Jellyfish" (Winchester only)
- Shaun Ryder – vocals on "Dare" (Winchester only)
- Roses Gabor – vocals on "Dare" (Winchester only)
- Mos Def – vocals on "Stylo" (New York City only)
- DRAM – vocals on "Andromeda" (Pico Rivera only)
- Graham Coxon – guitar on "Song 2" (Pico Rivera only)
- George Benson – guitar on "Humility" (Pico Rivera only)
