= Ticker tape (disambiguation) =

A Ticker tape was the earliest electrical dedicated financial communications medium, transmitting stock price information over telegraph lines.

Ticker tape may refer to:

- Ticker Tape (record label), a record label founded in 2011 by the English band Radiohead
- Ticker Tape (Gorillaz song), a track on the album Humanz by the British virtual band Gorillaz

== See also ==
- Ticker tape parade, a celebratory parade
