= She's My Collar =

2017 song by Gorillaz featuring Kali Uchis

Song by Gorillaz featuring Kali Uchis

from the album Humanz
- Released: 28 April 2017
- Length: 3:29
- Label: Parlophone; Warner Bros.
- Songwriters: Damon Albarn; Karly-Marina Loaiza
- Producers: Gorillaz; Remi Kabaka Jr.; Anthony Khan

"She's My Collar" is a song by British virtual band Gorillaz, released on their fifth studio album Humanz. It features guest vocals by Kali Uchis, who accompanies lead singer Damon Albarn throughout the track.

== Live performances ==
During the United States leg of the The Mountain Tour, the song was added to the setlist.

== Charts ==
Chart (2017)	Peak position
US Hot Rock & Alternative Songs (Billboard)	36

Chart (2021)	Peak position
Lithuania (AGATA)	95

== Certifications ==
Region	Certification	Certified units/sales
New Zealand (RMNZ)	Gold	15,000^{‡}
United Kingdom (BPI)	Silver	200,000^{‡}
^{‡} Sales+streaming figures based on certification alone.
