= Humanz =

2017 studio album by Gorillaz

- Standard digital edition cover

Studio album by Gorillaz
- Released: 28 April 2017
- Recorded: September 2015 – December 2016
- Studios: Studio 13 (London) (Note: All tracks); Mission Sound (Brooklyn) (Note: Tracks 2–5, 7, 17, 19); JM Jarre (Paris) (Note: Tracks 5, 20); Geejam (Port Antonio) (Note: Tracks 4, 16) Various additional: Feng Shui (Hollywood) (Note: Track 2); Upstairs (Atlanta) (Note: Track 5); Chicago Recording (Chicago) (Note: Track 14); Thomas Crown (Virginia Beach) (Note: Track 14)
- Genres: Art pop; R&B; hip hop; dance; electro; funk
- Length: 49:23
- Languages: English; Arabic; Spanish; Bambara
- Labels: Parlophone; Warner Bros.
- Producers: Gorillaz; The Twilite Tone; Remi Kabaka Jr.

Gorillaz chronology
The Singles Collection 2001–2011 (2011)	Humanz (2017)	The Now Now (2018)

Damon Albarn chronology
The Orchestra of Syrian Musicians (2016)	Humanz (2017)	The Now Now (2018)

Singles from Humanz
- 1. "Saturnz Barz" Released: 23 March 2017; 2. "We Got the Power" Released: 23 March 2017; 3. "Ascension" Released: 23 March 2017; 4. "Andromeda" Released: 23 March 2017; 5. "Let Me Out" Released: 6 April 2017; 6. "Strobelite" Released: 4 August 2017

Humanz is the fifth studio album by British virtual band Gorillaz, released on 28 April 2017 by Parlophone in the United Kingdom and Warner Bros. Records in the United States. It was the band's first studio album released in seven years, following a multiyear hiatus. The album was produced by The Twilite Tone and Remi Kabaka Jr., with Kabaka Jr. making his first contribution as a permanent producer for the band.

Following media reports of a fall out between Gorillaz co-creators Damon Albarn and Jamie Hewlett, Gorillaz entered a multiyear hiatus after the release of the 2012 non-album single "DoYaThing". During this time, Albarn released his debut solo record, Everyday Robots (2014), and recorded and toured with his band Blur, while Hewlett worked on film projects. Albarn and Hewlett reconciled and decided to return to Gorillaz in late 2014, with Albarn beginning to write songs for the album while still on the Everyday Robots tour. Recording officially began around September 2015 and continued through December 2016, taking place across various locations worldwide, including London, Paris, New York City and Jamaica.

The album features political themes, taking inspiration from the 2016 United States presidential election. Albarn has described the album as the soundtrack to "a party for the end of the world," envisioning a "dark fantasy" in which Republican candidate Donald Trump won the election, which was still considered a remote possibility at the time of recording. Musically, the album embraces an electronic "modern-sounding urban hip-hop/R&B sensibility", and features an expansive roster of guest artists, including Jehnny Beth, Grace Jones, Kali Uchis, Vince Staples, Popcaan, D.R.A.M., Anthony Hamilton, De La Soul, Danny Brown, Kelela, Mavis Staples, Pusha T, and Benjamin Clementine. Several songs from the album were released as singles, most notably lead single "Saturnz Barz" and "Strobelite". A "Super Deluxe" edition of the album was later released in November 2017, featuring an additional 14 tracks.

Humanz debuted at number two on the UK Albums Chart and the US Billboard 200, and reached the top 10 in 23 countries. The album received generally positive reviews from critics, who praised its energetic tone and political themes, though some criticized the abundance of guest artists, feeling it resulted in a bloated track list and a reduced presence from Albarn. The album was nominated for the Grammy Award for Best Alternative Music Album at the 60th Annual Grammy Awards. It was supported by the Humanz Tour from 2017 to 2018, the band's longest tour to date at the time, during which Albarn began recording the band's follow up studio album The Now Now (2018).

== Background ==
After the release of their 2010 album The Fall, rumours began to circulate on the internet that Gorillaz creators Damon Albarn and Jamie Hewlett had fallen out, and that this had led to the band split; People subsequently reported this to be true. Representatives for the band denied the rumours in a statement to Pitchfork. Gorillaz released a single with James Murphy and André 3000 commissioned by Converse, titled "DoYaThing", on 23 February 2012. In April 2012, in an interview with The Guardian, Albarn stated that Gorillaz were "unlikely" to release new music, citing Hewlett's dissatisfaction that his animation had become less central to the band and their performances. In June 2013, Hewlett said that he "believe[s] there is a future for the Gorillaz. But Gorillaz is quite a complicated and expensive thing to produce. So, I think we need to wait a little bit to see what happens because usually in the music industry everything changes."

On 25 April 2014, Albarn released the solo album Everyday Robots. Hewlett revealed that he and Albarn decided to revive Gorillaz after Albarn had played a gig, stating: "...we were at a party afterwards. We'd had a bit to drink, and he said, 'Do you want to do another one?' And I said, 'Do you?' and he said, 'Do you?' And I said, 'Yeah, sure.' I started work on it straight away, learning to draw the characters again. I played around by myself for eight months while he was performing with Blur in 2015." In October 2014, Albarn was said to be "in the process of reactivating Gorillaz for a 2016 release." In an Instagram post on 30 January 2015, Hewlett posted new drawings of fictional band members Murdoc and Noodle. He also responded to a fan's query by stating, "Yes Gorillaz Returns." Albarn's band Blur released their eighth studio album The Magic Whip on 27 April 2015. Before Blur's tour in support of The Magic Whip, Albarn said, "I'm starting recording in September for a new Gorillaz record." On 19 January 2017, Gorillaz released the first track from the album, "Hallelujah Money" featuring Benjamin Clementine, accompanied by a music video as a non-commercial single on Uproxx's YouTube channel.

== Recording ==
Prior to studio recording, Albarn made use of iPad applications such as GarageBand to create the framework for each song. Albarn had previously utilised his iPad as an audio workstation for The Fall, touting its convenience over the 4-Track recorder he'd previously used for preliminary music production.

To guide collaborators into the "dark fantasy" setting that Albarn envisioned for Humanz, Albarn instructed guest artists to imagine a future in which Donald Trump had won the 2016 United States presidential election. As recording for Humanz began well before Trump had secured the Republican presidential nomination, much less the presidency, the possibility of a Trump presidency was still considered remote by many; collaborator Pusha T (who recorded his contribution in early 2016) later commented on Albarn's inadvertent foresight, saying: "I wrote from the perspective of this day, I was writing from the perspective of a Trump win. When this really happened, I was like 'Wait a minute, what type of crystal ball did this guy have? Why are you even asking me to think along these lines?' I don't think he thought that [Trump] would win, I'm not gonna go that far, but he definitely conceptualized this whole thing." In April 2016, Hewlett uploaded two video clips onto his Instagram showing the continued work on the album. The first clip featured Liam Bailey and the Twilite Tone. The second clip was a time-lapse video featuring Albarn, Remi Kabaka Jr, the Twilite Tone and Jean-Michel Jarre. On 17 May 2016, Gorillaz were in the studio with Chicago-based hip hop artist Vic Mensa, although Bailey and Mensa's contributions were ultimately left off of the finished album.

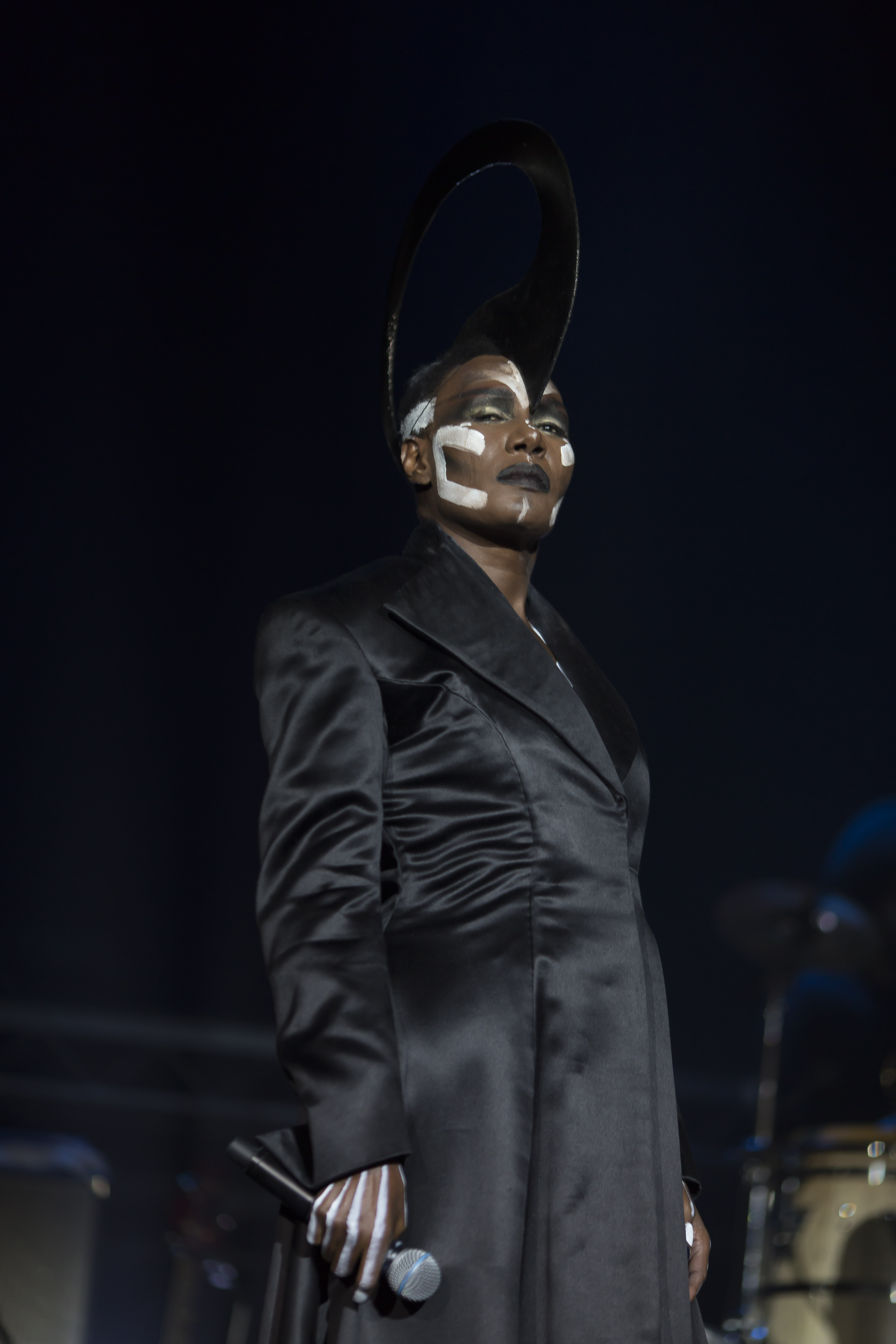
Jamaican singer and supermodel Grace Jones, one of the many collaborators on the album, features on the song "Charger". The song was a result of hours of ad-libbing over an instrumental.

In an interview with Q magazine, Albarn revealed that he reached out to collaborate with a number of different artists, many of whom turned him down, including English musician Morrissey, Dionne Warwick – who was unwilling to collaborate as some lyrics on the record conflicted with her religious views, singer Sade, and American rapper Rick Ross. Albarn also revealed in an interview with Song Exploder, that the song "Andromeda", featured a more prominent role for rapper D.R.A.M and at one point, featured contributions from Rag'n'Bone Man (which was ultimately discarded) and with French singer-songwriter Christine and the Queens, which was also unsuccessful. The group also reportedly recorded with Erykah Badu, whom Albarn had previously worked with on his Rocket Juice & the Moon project. The song "Charger" with Grace Jones was a result of Jones singing over the song's instrumental for four hours, ad-libbing and vibing to it. Overwhelmed by the length of the vocals recorded, Albarn had his studio floor covered in cut up pieces of paper with everything Jones had recorded, finding the fragments that worked and eventually crafting the song from there. A photo of this was also uploaded to Kabaka's Instagram, with the album's other executive producer the Twilite Tone, attempting to place the lyrics in an order for the song. Albarn also revealed that an unnamed collaborator's original vocals were removed from the song, so as to accommodate Jones' vocals. Album recording engineer Stephen Sedgwick's final mix session of "Charger" contains 90 separate tracks.

"We Got the Power" features guest vocals from Jehnny Beth, the lead singer of the British rock band Savages, as well as backing vocals from American rapper D.R.A.M and English singer Noel Gallagher. Albarn welcomed the arrival of Beth as the album was meant to be "a series of conversations between men and women". He hailed her performance, saying: "She sounds like herself, but there are also strong echoes of Siouxsie Sioux. She's brilliant." The song is a particular landmark for Albarn and Gallagher, after their public dislike of each other during what was dubbed by the media as "The Battle of Britpop" in the 1990s. At one point, the song featured backing vocals from Albarn's Blur bandmate Graham Coxon, however his vocals were removed from the final version of the song. "At one point this song had Graham, Noel and me on it and it was sort of heading slightly in the wrong direction. It was becoming almost retro in its sort of spirit and way too rocky for this record so I kind of stripped it right back down again. We play it slightly different live than how it is on the record. It's sort of the song that comes on during the final titles of a film. The climax. I thought Jehnny would take a bit of the testosterone off", Albarn said in an interview with Radio X. He also spoke of working with Gallagher for the first time, which Albarn was very complimentary: "He's fantastic in the studio. It's nice when you see how someone goes about their business. He's great". The song itself started after Albarn was given a Casio MT-40 for his birthday and he began composing the barebones of a demo, which was later fleshed out to become "We Got the Power". The idea to include Jehnny Beth came about after XL Recordings founder Richard Russell said that Gallagher and Albarn "were two rich middle-aged men singing about having the power, which is not a good look". Beth wrote her own lyrics to be included on the song as well as the lyrics that Albarn and Gallagher had also written.

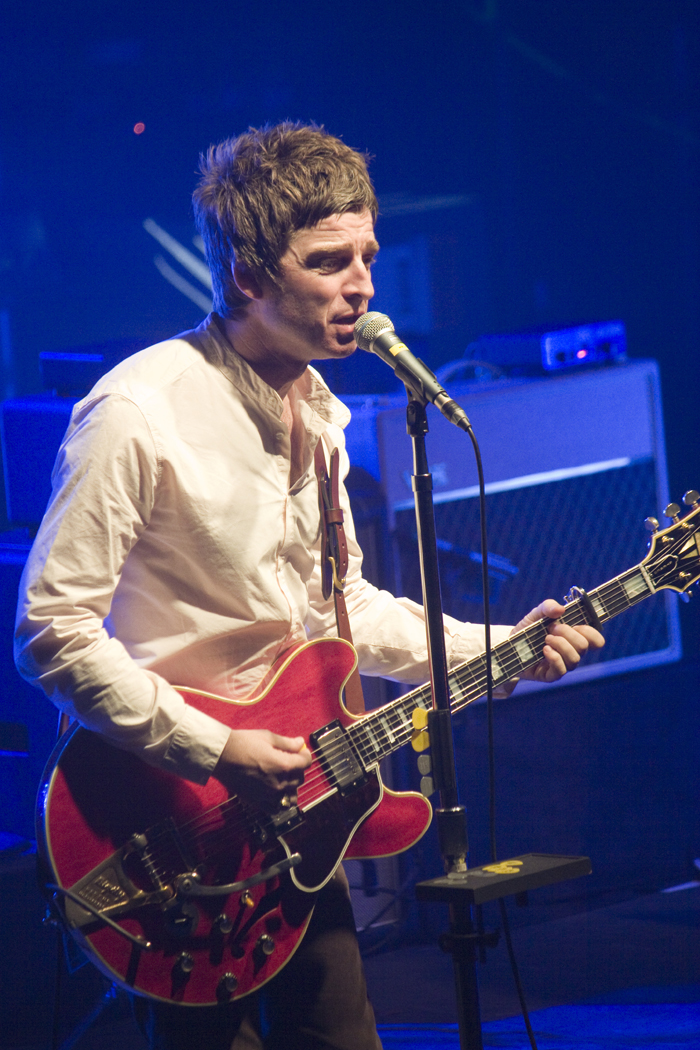
Noel Gallagher performing live in 2012. Gallagher's appearance on the song "We Got The Power" was an important feat for him and Albarn, as Albarn's previous project Blur and Gallagher's Oasis had participated on a conflict dubbed by "The Battle of Britpop", where they mutually insulted and competed against each other.

"Andromeda", the album's fourth single, was dedicated to Ethel, the mother of Albarn's longtime partner Suzi Winstanley, who died while Albarn was writing the song. Ethel's death reminded Albarn of Bobby Womack, who had appeared on the group's single "Stylo" and "Cloud of Unknowing" from their album Plastic Beach and appeared on the song "Bobby in Phoenix" from The Fall. Albarn and Russell had also produced Womack's comeback album The Bravest Man in the Universe, prior to Womack's death in June 2014. The sentimentality Albarn felt for lost family and friends was instrumental in the creation of "Andromeda", with Albarn commenting on the song's message: "Take the worst possible outcome, be brave, and remember all the goodness that preceded that... all the beauty that preceded that." Albarn also stated that after a conversation with producer the Twilite Tone, he tried to evoke the sound of Michael Jackson's 1983 single "Billie Jean" from his iconic Thriller album and Hall & Oates' single "I Can't Go for That (No Can Do)", from their album Private Eyes. Twilite Tone produced the song, while Albarn took care of lyrics. The song features D.R.A.M, who originally had a more prominent feature on the song, with a full chorus and verse, however, Albarn stripped the vocals back as the song felt more complete. At one point, the song's name was "I Can't Go for Billie Jean", as a reference to the aforementioned Michael Jackson song and Hall and Oates' song.

De La Soul had previously appeared on Gorillaz previous albums Demon Days and Plastic Beach on the songs "Feel Good Inc." and "Superfast Jellyfish" respectively, and appear on the album's fifth track "Momentz". Albarn revealed that the song was initially supposed to feature American stand-up comedian and actor Dave Chappelle, however, he became convinced after chatting to De La Soul member, Posdnuos. "I didn't hear De La Soul for that. Posdnous shows up. He said, 'I want to do something.' We were trying to get Dave Chappelle to do that. But he knows Pos, and somehow, that's how that happened."

Albarn revealed that there would be alternate versions of songs that would be released, one included an extended version of "Andromeda" with rapper D.R.A.M. and a Middle-Eastern version of "Busted and Blue", which was discovered to feature Syrian musician Faia Younan, who had previously collaborated with Albarn on the Africa Express project The Orchestra of Syrian Musicians and Guests, on which she was featured on the song "Yah Mahla El Fus'ha". While alternate versions of songs also exists, there are also songs that did not make the album, which were registered online by the group, which revealed that the band had collaborated further with Sidiki Diabaté, Little Simz and Azekel (who has backing vocals on the song "Momentz"). These songs were eventually released as the bonus tracks of the "Super Deluxe" edition of Humanz which was released on 3 November 2017.

In an interview with Sound on Sound, recording engineer Stephen Sedgwick and executive producer the Twilite Tone revealed some more of the stories behind the songs on the record. Such as the song "Strobelite", which came from an initial drum pattern made by Albarn on a SEIKO drum machine watch. While the drum pattern was being recorded, the production team were having a conversation, which ended up being recorded and was kept on the final track. The Anthony Hamilton-featuring "Carnival" originated from Albarn's experiences of visiting a carnival in Trinidad and Tobago, which inspired Hamilton in both his lyrics and vocal performance, while song and title "Sex Murder Party" came from a newspaper headline that Twilite Tone and Albarn read, which prompted the song's creation.

While promoting the album Merrie Land by the Good, the Bad & the Queen, Albarn revealed that he had reached out to singer Morrissey, from the Smiths, to appear on the song "Circle of Friendz", which ended up as a bonus track on the album's deluxe edition featuring Brandon Markell Holmes, but was unable to convince him to appear on the song.

== Themes ==
Albarn has said that with Humanz he set out to create something not overtly political, but "an emotional response to politics". The album's overarching theme is the emotional aftermath of an unexpected world-changing event. Albarn removed all references to Donald Trump on the album, saying "There's no references to [Trump] on the record – in fact, any time when anyone made any reference, I edited it out. I don't want to give the most famous man on earth any more fame, particularly. He doesn't need it!" There is however, a bonus track called "The Apprentice", referencing his former reality show. At one point, the album was titled Transformerz, although this was later abandoned, for fear of confusion with the film series of the same name.

Albarn was honoured at the Ivor Novello Awards where he picked up the lifetime achievement award for his work with Blur, Gorillaz, The Good, the Bad & the Queen, as well as his myriad of soundtracks and other work. During his acceptance speech, he spoke out about his love of the band Simple Minds and how they may be shaping the new Gorillaz record: "From someone who grew up in Leytonstone, it was a culture shock to say the least. Anyway, we were in this band and we had a guitarist who was an Edge from U2 obsessive, but we had a more kind of loose bass player who was really Simple Minds. Graham and me were a bit kind of more mercurial about what we like and what we don't like, but they were more adamant. Looking back at it now, I loved pretending that I was in U2, but I just think that Simple Minds were cooler. "Promised You a Miracle" – I listened to it when I started doing this new Gorillaz record and it just blew my mind, and it blew everyone who I was working with's mind. They hadn't even heard of Simple Minds, and they loved it – so that's testament to it being incredible."

== Release and promotion ==
On 6 March 2017, Gorillaz announced they were headlining their own festival called "Demon Dayz" at Margate, England. It took place on 10 June at the Dreamland amusement park, with free access to rides, and was also broadcast live, via Red Bull TV. The tickets were put on sale in the morning of 10 March, at 9:00am, and they sold out hours later. The festival was revealed to feature a number of collaborators from the album and other musicians that influenced the band, such as Vince Staples, De La Soul, Fufanu, Danny Brown, Little Simz, Kali Uchis, Popcaan and Kilo Kish.

On 23 March 2017, four new songs were premiered on various radio stations: "Saturnz Barz" and "Andromeda" on BBC Radio 1, "We Got the Power" on Radio X, and "Ascension" on Beats 1. The same day, all four songs were released for download, and a 360 Virtual Reality music video for "Saturnz Barz" was released in partnership with YouTube, being the first music video featuring the Gorillaz characters since 2012's "DoYaThing".

The same day, Gorillaz redesigned their website and announced a secret live concert at Printworks Nightclub, London, on the evening of 24 March 2017, featuring the first full performance of the album, and made a livestream on their Facebook page at the event.

The fifth single "Let Me Out", featuring Mavis Staples and Pusha T, was released on 6 April 2017.

A Gorillaz-themed augmented reality app created in collaboration with Electronic Beats was released on 10 April 2017, in which users interact with the band members, tour the studios, and listen to playlists made by the members. The next day, Gorillaz announced that the app would also be used to host the "Humanz House Party", a listening event touted as the "largest ever geo-specific listening experience". It took place on 21 April through 23, a week before the album release, and allowed fans to be the first to hear the new album in full. At the same time, Jamie Hewlett revealed in an interview with Q magazine that a 10-episode Gorillaz TV show was in the works.

On 17 April 2017, the Humanz Tour was formally announced on the band's official website, with concerts in Europe, Asia, North and South America. A copy of the album was included with a ticket purchase.

On 31 October 2017, "Garage Palace" featuring Little Simz was released as a single from the "Super Deluxe" Edition of Humanz, which includes 14 additional songs and was released on 3 November 2017.

== Reception ==
Professional ratings
Aggregate scores
Source	Rating
AnyDecentMusic?	7.4/10
Metacritic	77/100
Review scores
Source	Rating
AllMusic	3.5/5 stars
The A.V. Club	B
The Daily Telegraph	4/5 stars
The Guardian	4/5 stars
The Independent	4/5 stars
NME	4/5 stars
Pitchfork	6.9/10
Q	4/5 stars
Rolling Stone	3.5/5 stars
Uncut	7/10

According to the review aggregator Metacritic, Humanz received "generally favorable reviews" based on a weighted average score of 77 out of 100 from 32 critic scores. Common points of praise from reviewers pertain to the album's political themes, as well as its dark, yet playful "party" sound. Josh Gray of Clash felt that the band had "created their most youthful album yet; a vibrant record which paints a picture of the near future so vivid it seems convincingly real." Kenneth Partridge from Paste gave it an 8.5 rating and wrote "The result: the most vibrant, consistently engaging Gorillaz album yet". Writing for Exclaim!, Cam Lindsay posited that despite the album lacking any "Apple-friendly jingles", it "makes up for it with palatably overarching political themes and sequencing that gives it the wildly entertaining feel of a circus show." Stephen Thomas Erlewine of AllMusic gave the album 4/5 stars (which he would later change to 3.5/5) and stated that he thought of it as more wild and unruly than the band's 2010 album, Plastic Beach, due to the bigger focus on individual tracks as opposed to an overarching concept. He also noted that despite the album's very heavy R&B vibe and political undercurrent, he felt the album overall was "strangely uplifting, as if every musician who entered the studio found solace in the act of creation."

Niall Doherty of Q magazine pointed out Albarn's diminished vocal influence on the album compared to the two albums he had been involved with prior, Everyday Robots and The Magic Whip, concluding the review with "What Humanz lacks in memorable hooks, it makes up for in fist-clenching spirit – and 'We Got The Power' sums that up best. A defiant anthem featuring a thrilling turn from Savages' singer Jehnny Beth, it ensures an album about wading through the dark days ends on a triumphant note." Some reviewers overall felt that much of the band itself and its "cartoon image" fell to the wayside in the wake of its many collaborators. Consequence of Sound writer Nina Corcoran gave Humanz a B− grade, stating "In the end, Humanz structures itself like we’re watching Gorillaz host a party in a trendy club, all while the world burns. By positioning its four digital members just outside of the line of vision, though, it feels like an outlier in the band's catalog — which isn't necessarily a bad thing."

The structure of the album has had some critics draw comparisons to Drake's More Life. In terms of the album structure, critics have been more mixed. In a generally positive review, Alexis Petridis of The Guardian acknowledged the album as a "scattershot collection of tracks, rather than a coherent album." Record Collector thought of it both as a flaw but also its strength, stating that "the album throws it all at you in one gloriously delirious barrage that has no real anchor." Will Hermes of Rolling Stone wrote "If it's an uneven LP, it's fairly brilliant by mixtape standards, which may be the best way to measure it."

The album earned the band the award for British group at the Brit Awards 2018.

=== Accolades ===
Publication	Accolade	Year	Rank	Ref.
NME	NME's Albums of the Year 2017	2017	18	
Q Magazine	Q Awards Best Album 2017	2017	1	

== Commercial performance ==
In the United Kingdom, the album debuted at number two on the UK Albums Chart.

In the United States, Humanz debuted at number two on the US Billboard 200 behind Kendrick Lamar's Damn, with 140,000 album-equivalent units, of which 115,000 were pure album sales. It serves as Gorillaz's fourth top-ten album in the United States.

== Track listing ==
Adapted from liner notes:

Humanz – Standard edition
No.	Title	Writer(s)	Length
1.	"Intro: I Switched My Robot Off"		0:24
2.	"Ascension" (featuring Vince Staples)	Gorillaz; V. Staples	2:35
3.	"Strobelite" (featuring Peven Everett)	Gorillaz; Everett	4:32
4.	"Saturnz Barz" (featuring Popcaan)	Gorillaz; Andrae Sutherland	3:01
5.	"Momentz" (featuring De La Soul)	Gorillaz; Kelvin Mercer; David Jude Jolicoeur; Vincent Mason	3:16
6.	"Interlude: The Non-Conformist Oath"		0:21
7.	"Submission" (featuring Danny Brown and Kelela)	Gorillaz; Daniel Sewell; Kelela Mizanekristos	3:21
8.	"Charger" (featuring Grace Jones)	Gorillaz; Jones	3:34
9.	"Interlude: Elevator Going Up"		0:04
10.	"Andromeda" (featuring D.R.A.M.)	Gorillaz; Shelley Massenburg-Smith	3:17
11.	"Busted and Blue"	Gorillaz	4:37
12.	"Interlude: Talk Radio"		0:19
13.	"Carnival" (featuring Anthony Hamilton)	Gorillaz; Hamilton	2:15
14.	"Let Me Out" (featuring Mavis Staples and Pusha T)	Gorillaz; M. Staples; Terrence Thornton	2:55
15.	"Interlude: Penthouse"		0:11
16.	"Sex Murder Party" (featuring Jamie Principle and Zebra Katz)	Gorillaz; Principle; Ojay Morgan	4:19
17.	"She's My Collar" (featuring Kali Uchis)	Gorillaz; Karly-Marina Loaiza	3:29
18.	"Interlude: The Elephant"		0:11
19.	"Hallelujah Money" (featuring Benjamin Clementine)	Gorillaz; Clementine	4:23
20.	"We Got the Power" (featuring Jehnny Beth)	Gorillaz; Beth; Noel Gallagher	2:19
Total length:			49:23

Humanz – Deluxe tracks — Disc two
No.	Title	Length
21.	"Interlude: New World"	1:23
22.	"The Apprentice" (featuring Rag'n'Bone Man, Zebra Katz and Ray BLK)	3:55
23.	"Halfway to the Halfway House" (featuring Peven Everett)	3:57
24.	"Out of Body" (featuring Kilo Kish, Zebra Katz and Imani Vonshà)	3:44
25.	"Ticker Tape" (featuring Carly Simon and Kali Uchis)	4:29
26.	"Circle of Friendz" (featuring Brandon Markell Holmes)	2:11
Total length:		19:39

Humanz – Super deluxe vinyl tracks
No.	Title	Length
3.	"Long Beach"	3:23
5.	"Colombians"	3:57
7.	"Duetz"	2:43
9.	"Midnite Float" (featuring Azekel)	3:58
12.	"Grilling with His Face"	2:14
14.	"Charger (Alternate Version)" (featuring Pauline Black)	2:57
17.	"Andromeda (D.R.A.M. Special)" (featuring D.R.A.M.)	4:00
19.	"Busted and Blue (Faia Younan Special)" (featuring Faia Younan)	3:41
22.	"Carnival (2D Special)" (featuring Anthony Hamilton)	3:49
24.	"Five Whales in a Dream"	2:40
27.	"Garage Palace" (featuring Little Simz)	2:31
29.	"She's My Collar (Kali Uchis Spanish Special)" (featuring Kali Uchis)	2:52
32.	"Phoenix on the Hill" (featuring Sidiki Diabaté)	3:25
34.	"Tranzformer"	2:40
Total length:		44:50

Bonus tracks from the super deluxe vinyl edition are interspersed between the tracks of the standard edition. Tracks from the digital deluxe edition don’t appear on the super deluxe edition.

All together, these tracks run up to 1:53:52.

== Personnel ==
Credits adapted from the liner notes of the Super Deluxe edition of Humanz.

Gorillaz

- Damon Albarn – production, vocals, synthesizers, drums, keyboards, programming, guitar
- Jamie Hewlett – artwork, design
- Stephen Sedgwick – mixing, engineering
- Remi Kabaka Jr. – production, drum programming, percussion (all tracks), drums (track 27)
- John Davis – mastering
- Samuel Egglenton – assistance (tracks 2, 4, 6, 8, 11, 16, 18, 21, 23, 26, 28, 31, 33), additional engineering (track 13)

Additional musicians

- Ben Mendelsohn – narration (tracks 1, 8, 10, 15, 20, 25, 30, "Interlude: New World")
- Vince Staples – vocals (track 2)
- The Humanz^{[a]} – choir (tracks 2, 4, 6, 8, 11, 23, 31, "Halfway to the Halfway House", "Out of Body", and "Circle of Friendz")
- Peven Everett – vocals, additional keyboards (tracks 4, "Halfway to the Halfway House")
- Popcaan – vocals (track 6)
- De La Soul – vocals (track 8)
- Azekel – additional vocals (tracks 8, 9, 11)
- Jean-Michel Jarre – synthesizers (tracks 8, 9, 33, "Halfway to the Halfway House")
- The Twilite Tone – production, drums (tracks 9, 14, 17, 22, 24, 29), synthesizers (tracks 9, 14), bass (tracks 9, 17, 22, 24), drum programming (track 14)
- Kelela – vocals (track 11), additional vocals (track 18)
- Danny Brown – vocals (track 11)
- Graham Coxon – guitars (track 11)
- Grace Jones – vocals (track 13)
- Pauline Black – vocals (track 14)
- DRAM – vocals (tracks 16, 17), additional vocals (track 33)
- Roses Gabor – additional vocals (tracks 16, 17)
- Cheick Tidiane Seck – additional synthesizers (tracks 17, "Ticker Tape")
- Faia Younan – vocals (track 19)
- Anthony Hamilton – vocals (tracks 21, 22)
- Mavis Staples – vocals (track 23)
- Pusha T – vocals (track 23)
- Jamie Principle – vocals (track 26)
- Zebra Katz – vocals (tracks 26, "The Apprentice", "Out of Body")
- Little Simz – vocals (track 27)
- Kali Uchis – vocals (tracks 28, 29, "Ticker Tape")
- Benjamin Clementine – vocals (track 31)
- Sidiki Diabaté – vocals and kora (track 32)
- Jehnny Beth – vocals (track 33)
- Noel Gallagher – additional vocals (track 33)
- Rag'n'Bone Man – vocals (track "The Apprentice")
- Ray BLK – vocals (track "The Apprentice")
- Kilo Kish – vocals (track "Out of Body")
- Imani Vonzhà – vocals (track "Out of Body")
- Carly Simon – vocals (track "Ticker Tape")
- Brandon Markell Holmes – additional vocals (track "Circle of Friendz")

Additional technical

- Fraser T. Smith – production consulting (all tracks), additional production (track "The Apprentice")
- Michael Law Thomas – additional engineering (tracks 2, "Out of Body")
- KT Pipal – assistance (tracks 2, 4, 6, 8, 11, 28, 31, "The Apprentice", "Halfway to the Halfway House", "Out of Body", "Ticker Tape", "Circle of Friendz")
- Casey Cuyao – assistance (track 2)
- John Foyle – engineering (track 3)
- Morgan Garcia – additional engineering (track 8)
- J.U.S. – additional engineering (track 11)
- Paul Bailey – additional engineering (track 23)
- Alex Baez – assistance (track 23)
- Jonathan Lackey – assistance (track 23)
- Manon Grandjean – assistance (track "The Apprentice")

Additional artwork

- LuckyMe Studios – assistance art

Notes

- ^{^[a]}"The Humanz" consist of Rasul A-Salaam, Starr Busby, Melanie J-B Charles, Drea D'Nur, Giovanni James, Marcus Anthony Johnson, Janelle Kroll, Brandon Markell Holmes, and Imani Vonshà

== Singles ==
- On 23 March 2017, four singles were released onto Gorillaz YouTube channel and onto streaming services.
- The first single, "Saturnz Barz" bubbled under the Hot 100 at 101 and peaked at 5 on the US Hot Rock Song chart. In the UK, the single peaked at 87.
- "We Got The Power", the second single, peaked at 13 on the Hot Rock Songs chart and 38 on the Alternative Songs chart.
- "Ascension", the third single, peaked at 11 on the Hot Rock Songs chart. In the UK, the single peaked at 91.
- "Andromeda", the fourth single, peaked at 9 on the Hot Rock Songs chart.
- "Let Me Out", the fifth single, was released on 6 April 2017. It bubbled under the Hot 100 at 115 and peaked at 7 on the Hot Rock Songs chart.
- "The Apprentice", the sixth single, was released on 24 April 2017. It peaked at 18 on the Hot Rock Songs chart.
- "Strobelite", the seventh single, was released on 7 August 2017. It peaked at 22 on the Hot Rock Songs chart.
- "Garage Palace", the eighth single, and "Andromeda (D.R.A.M Special)", the ninth single, were released on 31 October 2017 and 1 December 2017, respectively. They were both released as a part of the "Super Deluxe" edition.

== Charts ==
=== Weekly charts ===
Chart (2017)	Peak position
Australian Albums (ARIA)	4
Austrian Albums (Ö3 Austria)	1
Belgian Albums (Ultratop Flanders)	1
Belgian Albums (Ultratop Wallonia)	3
Canadian Albums (Billboard)	2
Czech Albums (ČNS IFPI)	8
Danish Albums (Hitlisten)	6
Dutch Albums (Album Top 100)	6
Finnish Albums (Suomen virallinen lista)	10
French Albums (SNEP)	2
German Albums (Offizielle Top 100)	3
Greek Albums (IFPI)	11
Hungarian Albums (MAHASZ)	7
Irish Albums (IRMA)	2
Italian Albums (FIMI)	3
Japanese Albums (Oricon)	32
Mexican Albums (Top 100 Mexico)	3
New Zealand Albums (RMNZ)	3
Norwegian Albums (VG-lista)	4
Polish Albums (ZPAV)	16
Portuguese Albums (AFP)	3
Scottish Albums (Official Charts)	1
Slovak Albums (ČNS IFPI)	6
Spanish Albums (Promusicae)	4
Swedish Albums (Sverigetopplistan)	9
Swiss Albums (Schweizer Hitparade)	1
UK Albums (Official Charts)	2
US Billboard 200	2
US Top Alternative Albums (Billboard)	1
US Top Rock Albums (Billboard)	1

=== Year-end charts ===
Chart (2017)	Position
Australian Albums (ARIA)	76
Belgian Albums (Ultratop Flanders)	33
Belgian Albums (Ultratop Wallonia)	62
French Albums (SNEP)	160
Hungarian Albums (MAHASZ)	57
Mexican Albums (Top 100 Mexico)	52
Swiss Albums (Schweizer Hitparade)	88
UK Albums (OCC)	69
US Billboard 200	139
US Tastemakers Albums (Billboard)	6
US Top Alternative Albums (Billboard)	11
US Top Rock Albums (Billboard)	15

== Certifications ==
Region	Certification	Certified units/sales
Canada (Music Canada)	Gold	40,000^{‡}
Denmark (IFPI Danmark)	Gold	10,000^{‡}
France (SNEP)	Gold	50,000^{‡}
New Zealand (RMNZ)	Gold	7,500^{‡}
Poland (ZPAV)	Gold	10,000^{‡}
United Kingdom (BPI)	Gold	100,000^{‡}
Summaries
Worldwide	—	500,000
^{‡} Sales+streaming figures based on certification alone.
