= Luisa Almaguer =

Mexican singer and actress

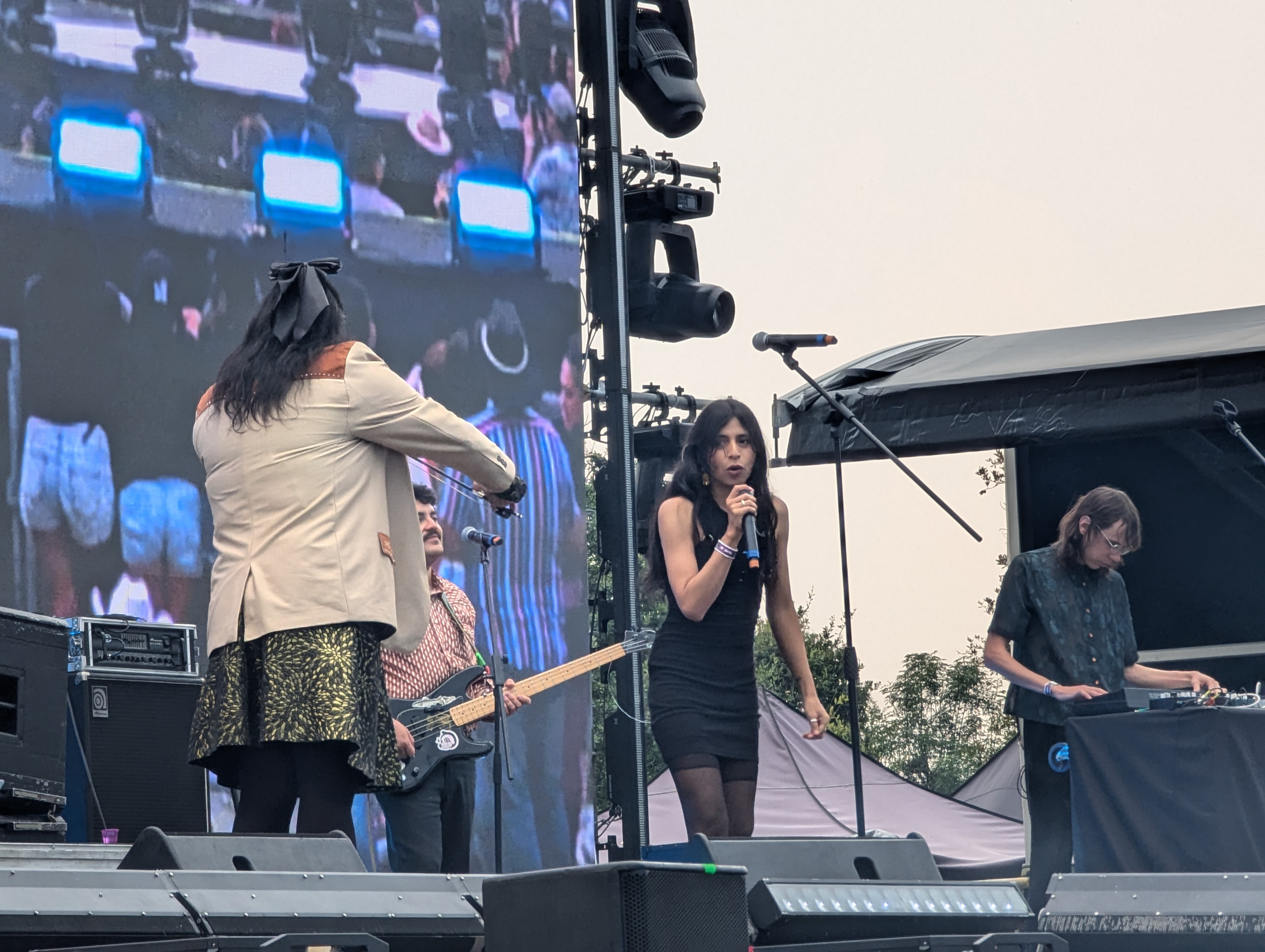
- Almaguer at the Mexcla Festival 2024

Background information
- Born: Azcapotzalco, Mexico City, Mexico
- Occupations: Singer; actress; communicator
- Instrument: Vocals
- Partner: Julián Name

Luisa Almaguer is a Mexican singer, actress and communicator. Her sound encompasses trova, shoegaze, hyperpop and grunge, among others. She has participated in various musical projects, as well as in different music festivals such as FICUNAM, Festival Marvin, Museo Tamayo, MUAC, Multiforo Alicia, Centro de Cultura Digital. She was also part of the REMEXCLA festival, the first organized by Spotify in Mexico. She has also collaborated with Damon Albarn and founded the first Latin American podcast of trans experiences, called La hora trans (The Trans Hour). For Almaguer, it is important to present herself as a trans singer because of the violence and stigmatization that this community experiences in Latin America.

In her music, Almaguer talks about trans experiences, as well as the violence that this community experiences and her experience as a victim of it. During her time as an actress, she has contributed to The Gigantes, Una mano bajo la nieve y otras historias, and Padre Pablo.

== Discography ==
- Mijillo (2016)
- Mataronomatar (2019)
- Azotea (2024)
