= Garage Palace =

Single by Gorillaz featuring Little Simz

from the album Humanz (Super Deluxe Edition)
- Released: 31 October 2017
- Genre: Bassline house; grime; hip hop; UK funky
- Length: 2:31
- Label: Parlophone; Warner
- Songwriter(s): Gorillaz; Simbiatu Ajikawo
- Producer(s): Gorillaz; The Twilite Tone; Remi Kabaka Jr.

Gorillaz singles chronology
"Strobelite" (2017)	"Garage Palace" (2017)	"Andromeda (D.R.A.M Special)" (2017)

Little Simz singles chronology
"The Book" (2017)	"Garage Palace" (2017)	"Bombo Fabrika Remix" (2017)

Visualiser
- "Garage Palace" on YouTube

"Garage Palace" is a song by English virtual band Gorillaz featuring British rapper Little Simz, who had been touring with the band and played at the first Demon Dayz Festival with the band where they performed the track and "Clint Eastwood". It was released on 31 October 2017 as a single from the Super Deluxe edition of the band's fifth studio album Humanz alongside a music video. It is one of the 14 outtakes from the Humanz sessions that didn't make it to the final album.

== Promotion ==
The song was first premiered by Damon Albarn on the Zane Lowe's Beats 1 radio show where he would also tease the track "Hollywood". During this, he also talked a bit about the collaboration stating, "I just was really struck by her kind of individualism, she's just not part of a scene, and I think that's great for her."

== Music video ==
A music video was released alongside the release of the single on 31 October 2017. It was directed by Noah Harris, and features the band and Little Simz in a 16-bit video game fighting enemies and reaching checkpoints. At the end of the song, they take to the sky where they reach the final boss.

== Charts ==
It charted as an "extra tip" on the Ultratip charts.

Chart (2017)	Peak position
US Hot Dance/Electronic Songs (Billboard)	37

== Personnel ==
- Damon Albarn – production, vocals, synthesizers, drums, keyboards, programming, guitar
- Remi Kabaka Jr. – production, drum programming, percussion, drums
- Little Simz – vocals
- Stephen Sedgwick – mixing, engineering
- John Davis – mastering
