= Let Me Out (song) =

Single by Gorillaz featuring Pusha T and Mavis Staples

from the album Humanz
- B-side: "Five Whales in a Dream"
- Released: 6 April 2017
- Genre: Hip hop; glitch; gospel
- Length: 2:56
- Label: Parlophone; Warner Bros.
- Songwriters: Damon Albarn; Mavis Staples; Terrence Thornton
- Producers: Gorillaz; Remi Kabaka Jr.; Anthony Khan

Gorillaz singles chronology
"Andromeda" (2017)	"Let Me Out" (2017)	"The Apprentice" (2017)

Pusha T singles chronology
"Circles" (2016)	"Let Me Out" (2017)	"Good Goodbye" (2017)

Mavis Staples singles chronology
"I Give You Power" (2017)	"Let Me Out" (2017)	"Witness" (2017)

Audio
- "Let Me Out" on YouTube

"Let Me Out" is a song by British alternative rock virtual band Gorillaz, featuring Pusha T and Mavis Staples. The song was released on 6 April 2017. It was released as the fifth single from their fifth studio album Humanz.

== Background and recording ==
"Let Me Out" is the fifth single from the band's album Humanz and was produced by Damon Albarn, Remi Kabaka and the album's executive producer The Twilite Tone. The song features guest vocals from gospel singer Mavis Staples and rapper Pusha T. The song was written by Albarn, on a train journey, when conceptualising the album, Pusha T wrote his verse upon meeting Albarn and Gorillaz co-collaborator Jamie Hewlett in London. When speaking to Zane Lowe, who premiered the song on his Apple Music Beats 1 radio show, Pusha said "When I get over there, Damon begins to tell me to conceptualize the album as a party for the end of the world, like if Trump were to win. … I didn’t want to think about it, but that did give me a very colorful backdrop … I wrote from the perspective of this day … from the perspective of a Trump win."

== Track listing ==
Digital release single

1. "Let Me Out" – 2:56

== Personnel ==
- Damon Albarn – vocals, synthesizer
- Pusha T – vocals
- Mavis Staples – vocals
- The Twilite Tone – synthesizer, additional vocals
- Remi Kabaka Jr. – drum programming
- John Davis – mastering engineer, engineering
- Jonathan Lackey – assistant
- Alex Baez – assistant
- Samuel Egglenton – assistant
- Stephen Sedgwick – engineering
- Paul Bailey – additional engineering
- The Humanz (Rasul A-Salaam, Starr Busby, Drea D'Nur, Giovanni James, Marcus Anthony Johnson, Janelle Kroll, Brandon Markell-Holmes, Imani Vonshà) – additional vocals

== Charts ==
Chart (2017)	Peak position
France (SNEP)	155
New Zealand Heatseekers (RMNZ)	6
Scottish Singles Sales (Official Charts)	75
UK Singles Downloads (Official Charts)	78
US Bubbling Under Hot 100 (Billboard)	15
US Hot Rock & Alternative Songs (Billboard)	7
