= Hallelujah Money =

2017 song by Gorillaz featuring Benjamin Clementine

Song by Gorillaz featuring Benjamin Clementine

from the album Humanz
- B-side: "Phoenix on the Hill"
- Released: 19 January 2017
- Genre: Gospel; electronica
- Length: 4:23
- Label: Parlophone; Warner Bros.
- Songwriter(s): Damon Albarn; Benjamin Clementine
- Producer(s): Gorillaz; Remi Kabaka Jr.; Anthony Khan

Music video
- "Hallelujah Money" on YouTube

"Hallelujah Money" is a song by British alternative rock virtual band Gorillaz, featuring Benjamin Clementine. The song was released on 19 January 2017. The song marks the group's musical comeback, and their first musical release since 2012's "DoYaThing". "Hallelujah Money" is a political song with gospel-style vocals on top of avant garde/electronic music. The song features English artist and musician Benjamin Clementine, marking Clementine's first collaboration with Gorillaz.

== Music video ==
The music video was uploaded to the UPROXX official YouTube channel on 19 January 2017. The video has Clementine singing in a gold-plated elevator, and features a cameo from Gorillaz lead singer 2D, who appears in puppet form at various points through the song. Various video clips, including from Animal Farm, Fantastic Planet, Village of the Damned, a spaghetti western starring Clint Eastwood, CCTV footage of an evil clown, documentary footage of tribal dancers, and a procession wearing white capirotes, are projected behind Clementine. The video ends abruptly with a clip from the episode "Karate Choppers" of the TV series SpongeBob SquarePants, although this is not present on the album version.

== Personnel ==
- Damon Albarn – vocals, synthesizer, programming
- Benjamin Clementine – vocals
- The Twilite Tone – drums
- John Davis – mastering engineer, engineering
- Stephen Sedgwick – engineering, mixing engineer
- Samuel Egglenton – assistant
- KT Pipal – assistant
- The Humanz (Rasul A-Salaam, Starr Busby, Melanie J-B Charles, Drea D'Nur, Giovanni James, Marcus Anthony Johnson, Janelle Kroll, Brandon Markell Holmes, Imani Vonshà) – additional vocals
