= Faia Younan =

Syrian singer

Faia Younan فايا يونان ܦܵܝܵܐ ܝܘܿܢܵܢ
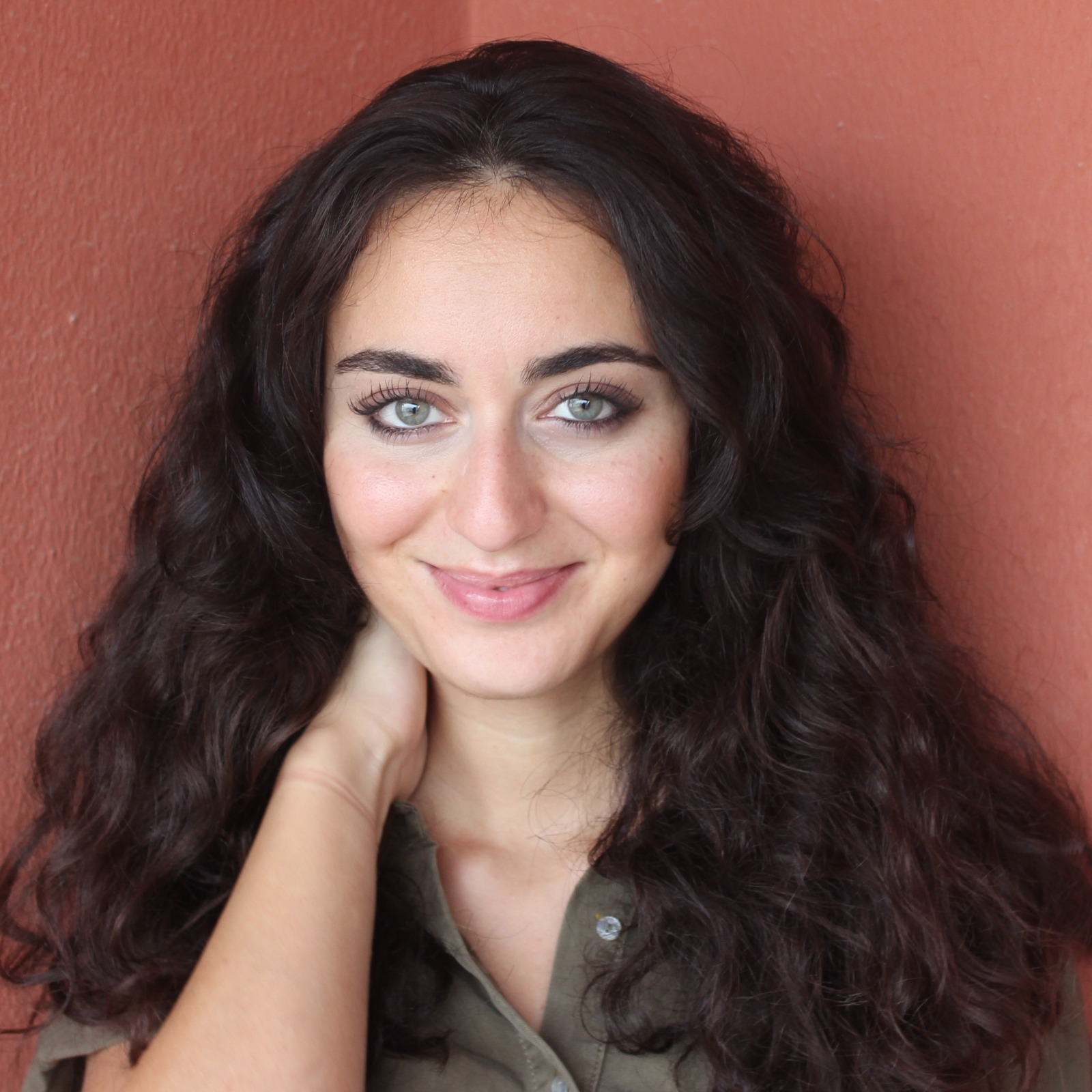
- Faia Younan

Background information
- Born: Faia Younan; 20 June 1992 (age 33); Tell Tamer, Syria
- Origin: Syria
- Genres: Arabic music, Syrian, Oriental
- Occupation: Singer and song writer
- Instrument: Vocals
- Years active: 2014–present
- Labels: Faya Younan sings during an interview with Al-Aan Arabic television on the fifteenth of March 2017.
- Website: Official website

Faia Younan (Arabic: فايا يونان; born 20 June 1992) is a Syrian-Assyrian singer, considered the first Middle Eastern artist ever to crowdfund her debut.

== Early life ==
Younan was born on June 20, 1992 to an Assyrian Christian family in the town of Tell Tamer, Syria, and grew up in the city of Aleppo. At the age of eleven she moved to Sweden with her family and settled there until she moved to Scotland in 2010 to study Social Sciences; Economics and Business in the Glasgow University. After graduating she moved back to Sweden. Younan was a volunteer in the Swedish Red Cross and sang in local events.

== Career ==
In October 2014, inspired by the political atmosphere in her native Syria and its neighboring Arab countries which she described as "loaded and hopeless", Younan published a video that she created with her sister Rihan, titled "To Our Countries". The video, which addresses the political reality of the Middle East and features Younan's rendition of several songs by Lebanese diva Fairuz, went viral on YouTube and received exceptional attention, encouraging Younan to continue pursuing a career in music. The success of the video had the biggest impact on her decision on turning singing from merely a hobby to a full-time commitment.

After a successful crowdfunding campaign, Younan released her debut single "Ohebbou Yadayka" (I Love Your Hands) followed by two other singles. "Ohebbou Yadayka" crowd funding campaign got Younan, in association with her manager Houssam Abdul Khalek, to Guinness World Records as the first Middle Eastern artist to crowd fund her debut song. This makes Younan the first female artist from the Arab World to enter the Guinness World Records Book. In 2017, she released her debut album, A Sea Between Us.

She was featured on the single "Busted and Blue" (Faia Younan Special)" from virtual band Gorillaz' which appears on two versions of their Humanz album.

In March 2019, Younan started releasing her second album Tales of the HEart digitally. The album contains 8 songs, referred to as tales, since each song is unique in musical genre and topic.

== Discography ==
=== Albums ===
Album	Details
A Sea Between Us	Release: March 25, 2017; Format: Digital download; CD
Tales of the Heart	Release: March 7, 2019; Format: Digital download; CD

=== Singles ===
Year	Title
2015	"Ohebbou Yadayka"
2015	"Nohebbou Al Bilad"
2015	"Nam Ya Habibi"
2017	"Shababik"
2018	"Hob Al Akwiyaa"
2018	"Baghdad"
2021	"Metel Elyom"
2022	"Kun Ashiqan"
