= Ascension (Gorillaz song) =

Single by Gorillaz featuring Vince Staples

from the album Humanz
- B-side: "Long Beach"
- Released: 23 March 2017
- Genre: Hip hop; grime
- Length: 2:36
- Label: Parlophone; Warner Bros.
- Songwriters: Damon Albarn; Vincent Staples; Anthony Khan
- Producers: Gorillaz; Remi Kabaka Jr.; Anthony Khan

Gorillaz singles chronology
"We Got the Power" (2017)	"Ascension" (2017)	"Andromeda" (2017)

Vince Staples singles chronology
"BagBak" (2017)	"Ascension" (2017)	"Big Fish" (2017)

Audio
- "Ascension" on YouTube

"Ascension" is a song by British alternative rock virtual band Gorillaz, featuring Vince Staples. The song was released on 23 March 2017. It was released as the third single from their fifth studio album Humanz.

== Background and recording ==
"Ascension" is Gorillaz' third single from their album Humanz and marks the group's first collaboration with American rapper Vince Staples. The song received its premiere on Apple Music's Beats 1 radio station.

The music video leads into "Saturnz Barz". The house from the latter is shown at the end.

== Track listing ==
Digital release single

1. "Ascension" – 2:36

== Personnel ==
- Damon Albarn – vocals, synthesizer, keyboards, drums, programming
- The Twilite Tone – synthesizer, drums, additional vocals
- Remi Kabaka Jr. – drum programming
- Stephen Sedgwick – recording engineer, mixing engineer
- John Davis – mastering engineer
- Michael Law Thomas – additional engineering
- Vince Staples – vocals
- Casey Cuyao – assistant
- Samuel Egglenton – assistant
- KT Pipal – assistant
- The Humanz (Rasul A-Salaam, Starr Busby, Melanie J-B Charles, Drea D'Nur, Giovanni James, Marcus Anthony Johnson, Janelle Kroll, Brandon Markell Holmes, Imani Vonshà) – additional vocals

== Charts ==
Chart (2017)	Peak position
Ireland (IRMA)	89
UK Singles (OCC)	91
US Hot Rock & Alternative Songs (Billboard)	11
