= Charger (song) =

2017 song by Gorillaz featuring Grace Jones

Song by Gorillaz featuring Grace Jones

from the album Humanz
- B-side: "Charger (Alternative Version)"
- Released: 28 April 2017
- Genre: Electro; rock; alternative rock; acid punk; electro-punk
- Length: 3:34
- Label: Parlophone; Warner Bros.
- Songwriters: Damon Albarn; Grace Jones
- Producers: Gorillaz; Remi Kabaka Jr.; Anthony Khan

Audio
- "Charger" on YouTube

"Charger" is a song by British virtual band Gorillaz, released on their fifth studio album Humanz. It features guest vocals by Grace Jones, who accompanies lead singer Damon Albarn throughout the track.

== Composition and recording ==
=== Origins ===
One of Damon Albarn's goals during the production of Humanz was to represent female artists more thoroughly. Speaking in an interview, Albarn listed Bobby Womack, Ike Turner, and Ibrahim Ferrer as examples of musical "patriarchs" who he'd already collaborated with; Albarn desired to collaborate with "matriarchs" as well, believing it necessary for an album titled "Humanz".

According to Albarn, he and Jones had met several times before recording "Charger" together: "I'd met her once in her nightclub, where I made the mistake of saying she looked like Little Red Riding Hood because she was wearing a red cape. She turned around and said 'Little Black Riding Hood,' and turned back. I didn't speak to her again." Despite the misstep in introductions, Jones later attended a performance of Albarn's Monkey: Journey to the West, admitting to Albarn that she enjoyed it. Jones and Albarn were acquainted through mutual management affiliates, though Albarn emphasized that it didn't make the process of collaborating with her any easier.

=== Recording ===
Scheduling proved difficult from the onset, with Albarn claiming that it took about four months to secure a recording day with Jones. During this period, Albarn continued work on "Charger"; by the time Jones was available to record, Albarn had already constructed an instrumental onto which an unnamed vocalist sang over, presumed to be Pauline Black, as she is featured on the Super Deluxe version of the song.

Once Jones and Albarn had gathered in the studio, Albarn played the song to her. Jones was initially ambivalent, complaining about a "noise." Albarn repeatedly questioned Jones on what the noise might be, eventually coming to his conclusion that Jones wasn't satisfied with the other vocalist's singing. After Albarn removed the unnamed singer's vocals from "Charger," Jones was prepared to begin recording. Commenting on the moment, Albarn said: "She wouldn't say it was this other person's voice. Once the voice had been taken off, the track was ready to work on. Some people don't necessarily want to be on the same tune with somebody else."

Jones' recording session was prolonged and frenetic, lasting four hours. Jones ad-libbed much of the session, and with such intensity that Albarn was taken aback: "It's slightly supernatural, her energy. Not entirely of this world." Some time after the recording session, Albarn covered the studio floor with pieces of paper with Jones' lyrics printed on them, crafting the lyrics to "Charger" from whichever fragments he felt were suitable. Album recording engineer Stephen Sedgwick's final mix session of "Charger" contains 90 separate tracks.

== Critical reception ==
"Charger" has received generally positive reviews: both Q Magazine and Consequence of Sound listed it as one of Humanz' highlight tracks, with the latter commenting: "Sure, Grace Jones' insidious laughter on 'Charger' while industrial beats scratch behind her may seem out of place, but it's one of Gorillaz's best songs to date, pushing the dance playlist setup of the album into a decidedly disordered flash of color and sound." Some critics took pleasure in the dichotomy between Albarn and Jones' vocals, with NME characterizing "Charger" as a track "where Grace Jones bares some sphinx-like teeth over a distorted two-note line [...] while Albarn's bewildered vocals splutter out in flouncy dribs and drabs. So strange, it's fantastic."

== Personnel ==
- Damon Albarn – vocals, guitar, drums, synthesizer
- Grace Jones – vocals
- Remi Kabaka Jr. – drum programming
- The Twilite Tone – drums, additional synthesizer
- John Davis – mastering engineer
- Samuel Egglenton – additional engineering
- Stephen Sedgwick – mixing engineer, recording engineer

== Charts ==
Chart (2017)	Peak position
US Hot Rock & Alternative Songs (Billboard)	28
