= We Love Green =

French music festival

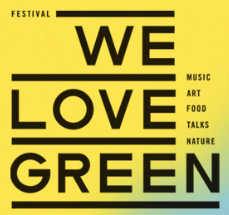
- Genre: Musique Indépendante, Indie, Rock, Rap, Hip-Hop, Dance, Electronique
- Locations: Plaine de Saint Hubert, Bois de Vincennes, Paris (since 2016)
- Years active: Since 2016
- Founded: 2010
- Founders: Marie Sabot (director); Emmanuel de Buretel
- Capacity: Debut: 40,000 / day (Capacity: Plaine de Saint Hubert, Bois de Vincennes)
- Organiser: Because Group (Because Music, Corida), We Love Art, Sony Music
- Website: http://www.welovegreen.fr

We Love Green is a French electro-pop music festival organized in Paris since 2010, taking place in June.

== History ==
Marie Sabot founded We Love Art in the mid-2000s with Alexandre Jaillon (Trax). This organization allowed for the hosting of events and nights related to art, music, or commercial brand promotion. A few years later, in 2011, the festival, primarily featuring electronic music, was launched at parc de Bagatelle 13,000 attendees. Year after year, the musical lineup diversified as the festival moved to Bois de Vincennes. In 2018, the festival had a permanent team of about fifteen people and a budget of €4.6 million. Despite minimal subsidies, it remained unprofitable and challenging to organize due to logistical issues imposed by the protected site of Bois de Vincennes.

In July 2025, the festival was acquired by the Combat group and AEG Presents France, who take an 80% stake. We Love Art and Because retain a 20% share.

== Concept ==
The festival was launched to demonstrate that it is possible to combine major musical events with environmental respect, a concept integrated from the start. It is organized by the event communication agency We Love Art founded by Marie Sabot, the music label Because] represented by Emmanuel de Buretel, and the tour organizer Corida. The team strives to implement good environmental and energy practices already widespread abroad into the festival; the goal is to then spread these practices through the technicians employed for the event. The organization also aims to raise awareness among festival-goers about these issues. The themes explored include both waste management and sustainable food for the festival-goers, and powered by a renewable energy supply. Additionally, the festival reserves spaces for associations engaged in these issues and since 2015, an entire stage dedicated to interventions and debates on ecological transition.

== Attendance ==
Year	Attendants
2011	13,000
2014	22,700
2016	47,000
2017	58,000
2018	74,000
2019	80,000
2022	100,000
2023	93,000
2024	110,000

== Editions ==
The represented musical styles are primarily electro, pop rock, and hip-hop.

== Controversies ==
=== Impact on Biodiversity ===
Christine Nédélec, president of the ecological association France Nature Environnement Paris, denounces the ecological inconsistency of the festival within Vincennes Wood, classified as a Zone of Ecological, Fauna, and Flora Interest. She accuses the festival of greenwashing practices. She highlights the impact of the festival on biodiversity, which includes over 300 wild species of lichens and mushrooms, nearly 500 wild plants, and 959 wild animals. She criticizes the presence of tens of thousands of festival-goers and the acoustic impact with sound levels reaching up to 102 decibels.

The organizers claim to have conducted an impact study with Ligue pour la protection des oiseaux (League for the Protection of Birds), but they have not published the results. The LPO recommends "large-scale research on reproduction" to truly assess its impact and advocates for a date change. The month of June "coincides with the bird reproduction period" at a time when "nearly half of the world's bird species are in decline".

Marie Sabot considers it "difficult" to change the festival dates because they are scheduled in consultation with the industry to avoid competition with Solidays at the end of June, Lollapalooza Paris in July, Rock en Seine in August and September, and the Fête de l'Humanité. She believes she does not have "the decision-making power".

In spring 2023, We Love Green commissioned an annual impact study on the flora and fauna of Bois de Vincennes in response. The festival follows the recommendations from the Paris City Hall.

Marie-Noëlle Bernard, head of the local branch of Groupe national de surveillance des arbres (the National Tree Monitoring Group) and the collective Sauvons le Bois de Vincennes (Save Vincennes Wood), points out the responsibility of the Paris City Hall, which manages the woods and selected this location for the festival following a call for projects in 2016. The 12th arrondissement of Paris subsidizes We Love Green and the Peacock Society Festival to the tune of €22,000. In return, the city hall receives a fee equivalent to 8% of its revenue under a public domain occupancy agreement, amounting to between €200,000 and €300,000.
