= Strobelite =

Single by Gorillaz featuring Peven Everett

from the album Humanz
- B-side: "Colombians"
- Released: 4 August 2017
- Genre: Disco; funk; soul
- Length: 4:32
- Label: Parlophone; Warner Bros.
- Songwriters: Damon Albarn; Peven Everett
- Producers: Gorillaz; Remi Kabaka Jr.; Anthony Khan

Gorillaz singles chronology
"Sleeping Powder" (2017)	"Strobelite" (2017)	"Garage Palace" (2017)

Peven Everett singles chronology
"Feelin' You In and Out" (2017)	"Strobelite" (2017)

Music video
- "Strobelite" on YouTube

"Strobelite" is a single by British virtual band Gorillaz, released on their fifth studio album Humanz. It features guest vocals by Peven Everett. The single was released on 4 August 2017, with an accompanying music video released three days later.

== Music video ==
The music video to "Strobelite" was released on 7 August 2017. It was created by Passion Pictures.

The video is set in a dance club, featuring animated band members 2-D and Noodle dancing center stage amongst a crowd of clubgoers as collaborator Peven Everett sings from the sidelines. A combination of live-action and 3D CGI shots were used to create the video, much like the music video for Gorillaz' 2010 single "Stylo". Motion capture was utilized to animate the virtual band members. The video features cameos by several Gorillaz collaborators, including Vince Staples, Posdnuos of De La Soul, Savages' Jehnny Beth, Phil Cornwell, the voice of Gorillaz band member Murdoc Niccals, and Jamie Hewlett, the co-creator of Gorillaz.

== Personnel ==
- Damon Albarn – vocals, synthesizer
- Peven Everett – vocals, additional keyboards
- The Twilite Tone – additional vocals, synthesizer, drums, bass guitar
- Remi Kabaka Jr. – drum programming
- Stephen Sedgwick – sampled loops, additional drum programming, engineering, mixing engineer, recording engineer
- John Davis – mastering engineer
- KT Pipal – assistant
- Samuel Egglenton – assistant
- The Humanz (Rasul A-Salaam, Starr Busby, Melanie J-B Charles, Drea D'Nur, Giovanni James, Marcus Anthony Johnson, Janelle Kroll, Brandon Markell Holmes, Imani Vonshà) – additional vocals

== Charts ==
Chart (2017)	Peak position
Belgium (Ultratip Bubbling Under Flanders)	24
Belgium (Ultratip Bubbling Under Wallonia)	35
US Hot Rock Songs (Billboard)	22
