= Saturnz Barz =

Single by Gorillaz featuring Popcaan

from the album Humanz
- B-side: "Duetz"
- Released: 23 March 2017
- Genre: Dancehall; trip hop; reggae; electro-dub
- Length: 3:01
- Label: Parlophone; Warner Bros.
- Songwriters: Damon Albarn; Andrae Sutherland
- Producers: Gorillaz; Remi Kabaka Jr.; Anthony Khan

Gorillaz singles chronology
| "DoYaThing" (2012) | "Saturnz Barz" (2017) | "We Got the Power" (2017) |

Popcaan singles chronology
| "Should've Been Me" (2016) | "Saturnz Barz" (2017) | "One You Love" (2017) |

Music videos
- "Saturnz Barz (Spirit House)" on YouTube
- "Saturnz Barz (Spirit House)" (360° Version) on YouTube

"Saturnz Barz" is a song by British virtual band Gorillaz, featuring Jamaican dancehall artist Popcaan. The song was released on 23 March 2017. It was released as the lead single from their fifth studio album Humanz. The song marks the group's comeback since 2012's "DoYaThing", although 2017 had seen the non-single release of the song "Hallelujah Money" which features English singer Benjamin Clementine. "Saturnz Barz" was produced by frontman Damon Albarn, Remi Kabaka Jr. and producer The Twilite Tone, and marks the group's second collaboration with Popcaan.

"Saturnz Barz" reached number one on the US Bubbling Under Hot 100 chart and number five on the US Hot Rock Songs chart. In November 2017, the staff of Rolling Stone ranked the song number 38 on their list of the 50 Best Songs of 2017.

== Background and recording ==
"Saturnz Barz" was recorded by Damon Albarn, Remi Kabaka and Anthony Khan (The Twilite Tone) in Jamaica. In an interview with MistaJam on BBC Radio 1, Albarn revealed that the planned collaboration with Popcaan almost did not come to fruition, stating "He (Popcaan) came with quite a few of his friends. The session started about midnight, 1:00 in the morning...We worked all into the night but at the end of it I wasn't really feeling it, I don't know why. Next day, we had a chat, communicated and he came in and he did this. I think this is quite different to anything else he'd ever done. It's very personal. It tells a kind of alternate narrative to a lot of the ideas within modern dancehall."

Gorillaz have always been known for their collaborations, as has been seen across their various albums, including their self-titled debut album, Demon Days and Plastic Beach. Albarn stated that the art of collaboration and the process of picking featured guests, however, was not merely a "random selection", but was only people with whom he connects. "After spending a few studio sessions together in Jamaica, we became fast friends. Necessity is the mother of invention...and he came out with this. It just fitted perfectly...And we've got this crazy tune. I mean it doesn't sound like anything else!" he said in the same interview. On 1 May 2022, the music video was re-uploaded to the Gorillaz YouTube channel with commentary from virtual band member Murdoc Niccals.

== Music video ==
The video for the song, subtitled "Spirit House", was released on 27 March 2017 in YouTube. Two versions of the video were created; one takes advantage of YouTube's 360-degree video feature, while the other does not. According to Albarn, the music video cost $800,000 to produce.

In the video, the band drives up to an abandoned house. As they approach the front porch, Murdoc rings the doorbell, but as he does, the weather changes from sunny to a thunderstorm. It is revealed that this house is the band's new home into which they had just moved. The band splits up and explores the house individually with Noodle going down to the basement where she finds a record player and some old records, 2-D a fridge in the kitchen that opens up by itself, Russel taking a nap in one of the bedrooms, and Murdoc taking a bath. Over the course of the video, strange things begin to happen. As the song begins, 2-D is shown outside the fridge, looking at a cake inside from the perspective of the cake. Murdoc submerges himself in the bath, seen floating through a black void when the perspective of the video dives into the bath. Russel is then shown sleeping, but he is attacked by a black snake-like creature who constantly harasses him in the bed. Noodle is attacked and constricted by a large blue one-eyed worm, and 2-D finds a cake in the fridge and attempts to eat it, but is launched away from the fridge by the food in it with a slice of pizza hovering to the viewer and singing the phrase "All my life," a phrase repeated constantly in the song. Both the snake-like creature and the large blue worm recite lyrics to the song while harassing the characters. Most of the video following is Murdoc floating through a field of tiny asteroids with Saturn in the background. Later, the video ends with the weather changing back to sunny and the house returning to normal. The band is shown in the car, with Murdoc and Russel agreeing to get breakfast, though 2-D remarks he only wants a peppermint tea, and they drive off.

The Spirit House depicted in the video is based on a house at 220 Hendrie Street in Detroit, Michigan. The band's car, based on a 1961 Cadillac convertible, carries the Michigan license plate "Bass Tzar Run", an anagram of "Saturnz Bars".

== Song references ==
- As the band drives up to the house at the beginning of the video, "Ascension" can be heard playing from the car.
- As the band drives away at the very end of the video, both "Andromeda" and "We Got the Power" can be heard playing from the car.

== Track listing ==
Digital download single

1. "Saturnz Barz" – 3:09

Banx & Ranx remix

1. "Saturnz Barz (Banx & Ranx Remix) - 3:15

Baauer remix

1. "Saturnz Barz" (Baauer Remix) – 3:49

Cadenza remix

1. "Saturnz Barz" (Cadenza Remix) [feat. Assassin, Mad Cobra, Killa P, & Teddy Bruckshot] - 4:39

== Personnel ==
- Damon Albarn – vocals, synthesizer, keyboards, programming
- John Davis – mastering engineer
- Remi Kabaka Jr. – drum programming
- The Twilite Tone – additional drums, additional synthesizer
- Stephen Sedgwick – mixing engineer, recording engineer
- The Humanz (Melanie J-B Charles, Marcus Anthony Johnson, Brandon Markell Holmes, Imani Vonshá, Starr Busby, Rasul A-Salaam, Drea D'Neur, Giovanni James, Janelle Kroll) – additional vocals
- Popcaan – vocals
- KT Pipal – assistant
- Samuel Egglenton – assistant

== Charts ==
=== Weekly charts ===
| Chart (2017) | Peak position |
|---|---|
| Canada Hot 100 (Billboard) | 75 |
| France (SNEP) | 114 |
| Hungary (Single Top 40) | 33 |
| Ireland (IRMA) | 88 |
| Mexico (Mexico Ingles Airplay) | 48 |
| New Zealand Heatseekers (RMNZ) | 5 |
| Portugal (AFP) | 81 |
| Sweden Heatseeker (Sverigetopplistan) | 18 |
| UK Singles (Official Charts) | 87 |
| US Bubbling Under Hot 100 (Billboard) | 1 |
| US Hot Rock & Alternative Songs (Billboard) | 5 |

=== Year-end charts ===
| Chart (2017) | Position |
|---|---|
| US Hot Rock Songs (Billboard) | 44 |

== Certifications ==
| Region | Certification | Certified units/sales |
|---|---|---|
| United Kingdom (BPI) | Silver | 200,000^{‡} |
^{‡} Sales+streaming figures based on certification alone.
