= We Got the Power (Gorillaz song) =

Single by Gorillaz featuring Jehnny Beth

from the album Humanz
- B-side: "Tranzformer"
- Released: 23 March 2017
- Genre: Rock; electropunk; power pop; new wave; synth-pop
- Length: 2:20
- Label: Parlophone; Warner Bros.
- Songwriters: Damon Albarn; Jehnny Beth; Noel Gallagher
- Producers: Gorillaz; Remi Kabaka Jr.; Anthony Khan

Gorillaz singles chronology
"Saturnz Barz" (2017)	"We Got the Power" (2017)	"Ascension" (2017)

Jehnny Beth singles chronology
"We Got the Power" (2017)	"I'm the Man" (2019)

Audio
- "We Got the Power" on YouTube

"We Got the Power" (referred to as "We Got the Power (Version 2:18:482)" in the tracklist and the booklet) is a song by British alternative rock virtual band Gorillaz, featuring Jehnny Beth of British post-punk band Savages and backing vocals from Oasis guitarist and songwriter Noel Gallagher and American rapper D.R.A.M., who also appears on the group's single "Andromeda". The song was released on 23 March 2017. It was released as the second single from their fifth studio album Humanz.

== Background and recording ==
"We Got the Power" is the second single from the band's album Humanz and was produced by Damon Albarn, Remi Kabaka, and the album's executive producer The Twilite Tone. The song features guest vocals from Jehnny Beth, the lead singer of the British band Savages as well as backing vocals from American rapper D.R.A.M. and Noel Gallagher. The song is a particular landmark for Albarn and Gallagher, after their public feud during what was dubbed by the media as "The Battle of Britpop" in the 1990s. At one point, the song featured backing vocals from Albarn's Blur bandmate Graham Coxon; however, his vocals were removed from the final version of the song.

In an interview with Radio X, Albarn spoke of the song, saying "At one point this song had Graham, Noel and me on it and it was sort of heading slightly in the wrong direction. It was becoming almost retro in its sort of spirit and way too rocky for this record so I kind of stripped it right back down again. We play it slightly different live than how it is on the record. It's sort of the song that comes on during the final titles of a film. The climax. I thought Jehnny would take a bit of the testosterone off". He also spoke of working with Gallagher for the first time, which Albarn was very complimentary: "He's fantastic in the studio. It's nice when you see how someone goes about their business. He's great."

== Music video ==
On 26 May, in collaboration with e.on, a music video for the song was released. The video shows a number of electrical toys and gadgets dancing in tune with the song with a toy version of the band appearing near the end of the song for the climax.

== Track listing ==
Digital release single

1. "We Got the Power" – 2:20
2. "We Got the Power" (Claptone Remix) – 6:05

== Personnel ==
- Damon Albarn – vocals, synthesizer, drums
- Jean-Michel Jarre – synthesizer
- Stephen Sedgwick – mixing engineer
- The Twilite Tone – drums
- Samuel Egglenton – bells, assistant
- John Davis – mastering engineer, engineering
- Jehnny Beth – vocals
- Noel Gallagher – additional vocals
- DRAM – additional vocals

== Charts ==
Chart (2017)	Peak position
Czech Republic Airplay (ČNS IFPI)	57
France (SNEP)	158
Mexico (Mexico Ingles Airplay)	43
Scottish Singles Sales (Official Charts)	89
UK Singles Downloads (Official Charts)	78
US Hot Rock & Alternative Songs (Billboard)	13
US Alternative Songs (Billboard)	38
