= DoYaThing =

Single by Gorillaz featuring James Murphy and André 3000
- Released: 23 February 2012
- Recorded: Autumn 2011
- Studio: Studio 13 London
- Genre: Alternative hip hop; alternative dance; electronica; krautrock
- Length: 4:26 (radio edit); 13:04 (full version)
- Label: Converse; EMI
- Songwriters: Damon Albarn; André Benjamin; James Murphy
- Producers: Gorillaz; André Benjamin; James Murphy

Gorillaz singles chronology
"Revolving Doors" / "Amarillo" (2011)	"DoYaThing" (2012)	"Saturnz Barz" (2017)

James Murphy singles chronology
"DoYaThing" (2012)

André 3000 singles chronology
"I Do" (2012)	"DoYaThing" (2012)	"Sorry" (2012)

Music video
- "DoYaThing" on YouTube

"DoYaThing" is a single by British alternative rock virtual band Gorillaz, featuring LCD Soundsystem frontman James Murphy and André 3000 of Outkast. The single was released on 23 February 2012. It was commissioned by Converse as a part of their "Three Artists. One Song" project where three artists collaborate on a track. The song is also the starting point for a limited edition Chuck Taylor All-Stars collection designed by Gorillaz artist Jamie Hewlett. The shoe designs feature artwork from other projects related to Gorillaz. It was released in two different versions: the approximately 4-and-a-half-minute radio edit, and the explicit 13-minute version. The former was released as a free download on Converse's website, while the latter was released for streaming on Gorillaz's website.

== Background and recording ==
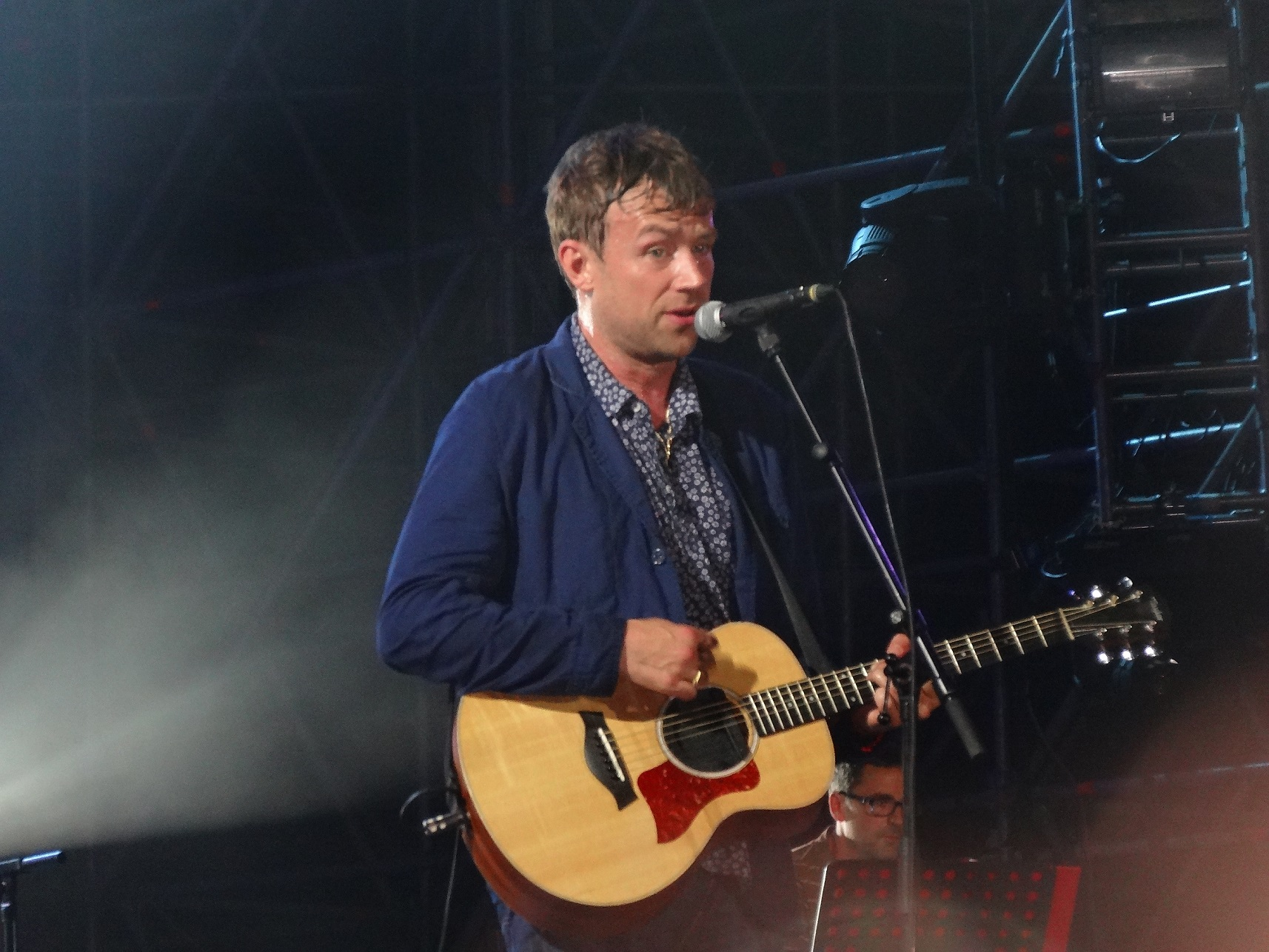
Damon Albarn

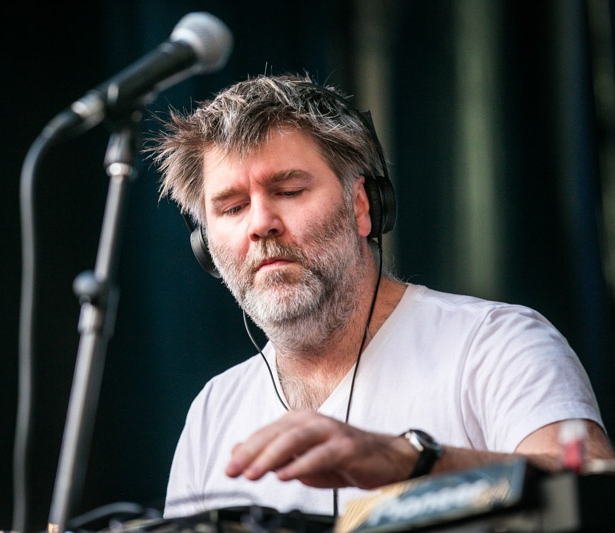
James Murphy

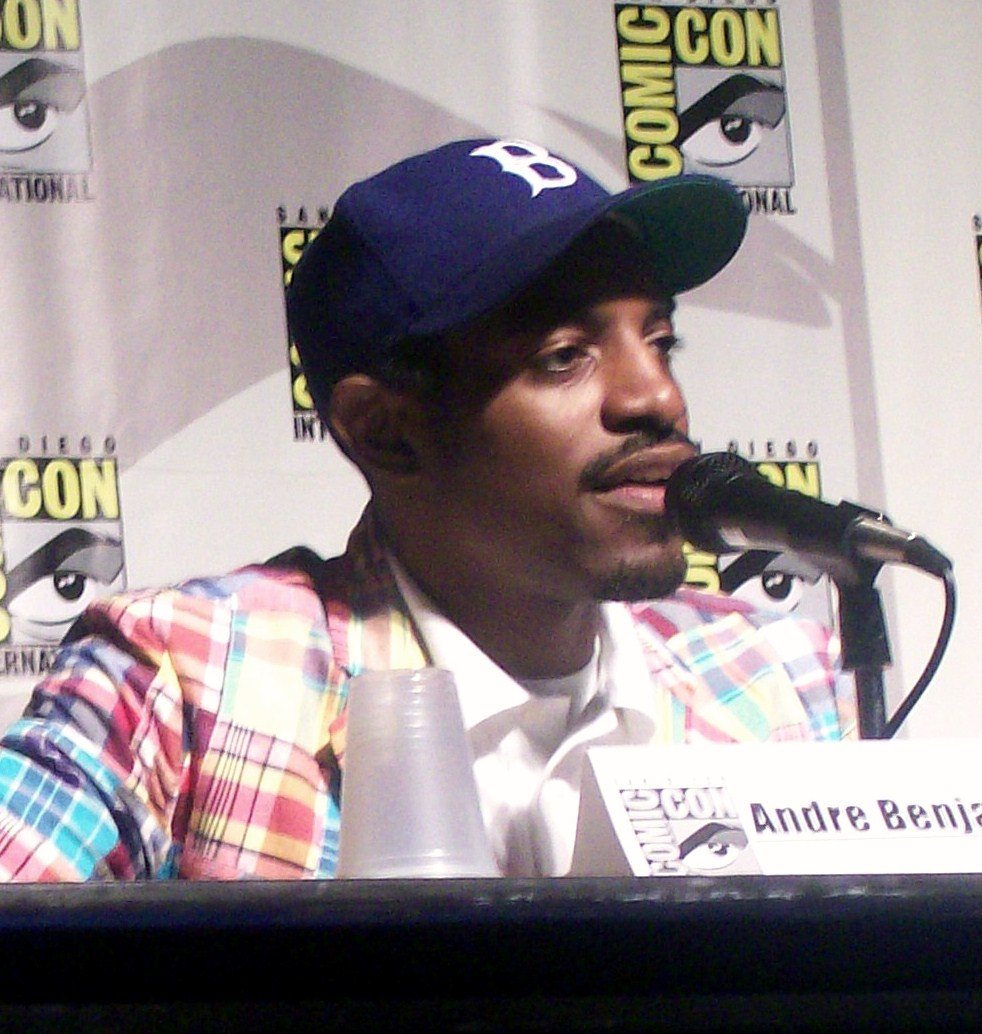
André 3000

The idea for "DoYaThing" started when Converse asked Gorillaz creators Damon Albarn and Jamie Hewlett to design an exclusive shoe collection that would feature artwork influenced by Gorillaz. After the design was finished, Converse and Cornerstone, the company that promotes products from the "Three Artists. One Song." campaign, persuaded Albarn to broaden their partnership to a collaborative track. Albarn accepted, and invited LCD Soundsystem leader James Murphy and Outkast member André 3000, who both signed on.

Instead of recording the song by sending it via e-mail, as Murphy initially feared, the three met in Albarn's London studio to record the track. Despite the three only knowing each other through their music, Albarn described the experience of meeting them as "very natural", saying "We were comfortable with each other immediately." The song was written and recorded over three days, with the 13-minute version being recorded on the last one.

Speaking further about the collaboration Albarn said: "I only knew these guys through their work before we got together. The 12-minute version represents what we did over three days-- it's quite an insane progression. That version evolved out of just a drum beat and a guitar, and then André just started going, and there was no sense that he was ever going to stop, it was a very exhilarating ride. It's live: I'm playing guitar, the drum machine is going, James is playing bass, and André just goes off. And what he's saying just gets more and more ridiculous. It finished on its own will, we really had nothing to do with it."

== Composition ==
"DoYaThing"
This 26-second sample of the song highlights Murphy's hook and André 3000's singing.

The song features Albarn playing guitar, Murphy playing bass guitar, and André 3000 rapping with a drum machine in the background. The song's lyrics are abstract, as Albarn said it was hard to write them based on a shoe. Albarn starts the song rapping in his "2-D voice", ad-libbed. Murphy then sings the chorus in falsetto with an organ playing in the background. His vocals on the song have been likened to Alexis Taylor of Hot Chip. Two minutes into the song, André 3000 starts rapping around the title line "Do ya damn thang."

The song was originally only a drum beat and a guitar. Because of this, the 13 minute version of the song was seen as a progression of the song by Albarn. It was recorded on the trio's last day of recording together. This version of DoYaThing continues from the 5 minute edit, with André 3000 improvising and the song building to a noisy, krautrock-esque climax, reminiscent of Murphy's band, LCD Soundsystem's "Yeah" (Crass Version). During the five-minute climax, André 3000 repeatedly yells the phrase "I'm the shit", followed by boasts like "The Moon is jealous of me, The Sun is jealous of me". The lyric was based on an encounter Albarn had with Brian Eno (whom Albarn would later collaborate with on his debut solo album Everyday Robots, on the tracks "You and Me" and "Heavy Seas of Love") who responded to Albarn's "How's it going Brian?" by telling him "Everything I'm working on is coming out great." The three likened the response to saying "Oh, it's great – I'm the shit." Albarn and Murphy both thought this version was a good representation of their work on the song; Albarn stated "It's a nice narrative."

== Reception ==
The song received positive reviews from music critics. Jon Dolan of Rolling Stone gave the song three and a half stars out of five, writing "Putting this many visionary types in one studio could’ve made for a mess, but they lock in for a three-man weave – like the Bird-McHale-Parish of avant-R&B." The Michigan Daily criticized the beat as "awkward", Albarn's rapping as a "fail[ure]", and Murphy's chorus as "weird and warbling". However, the newspaper highly praised André 3000's rapping, as they stated "His lines are sick, his pacing is Gatling-gun quick, and he dominates in comparison [to Murphy and Albarn]." As a whole, they gave the track three and a half stars out of five.

In a positive review, NME complimented the duo of Damon Albarn and André 3000. Writer Priya Elan stated "Murphy makes a brilliant backstage star, but the song is all about the Damon and Andre moment." Beats Per Minute named the track the best one so far of the "Three Artists. One Song." project, calling it "a potent reminder of the power of collaborative music." They gave the track 9 out of 10, saying the artists "play off of each other remarkably well." The Huffington Post wrote that the track was "one of the best collaborations we've heard in a while," saying it "merges three genre pools, but still highlights the traits distinctive to each musician."

== Music video ==
The video for "DoYaThing" was directed by Jamie Hewlett and was released on 29 February 2012. The video uses a mix of 2-dimension and CGI characters combined with live-action footage. The house used for filming is 212 Hammersmith Grove, in Hammersmith, West London.

The video opens with live-action footage of a crocodile scaring a herd of antelope before transitioning to 2-D waking up in a London flat. After getting dressed, 2-D checks on a sleeping Noodle, then finds a masked figure representing André 3000 in the bathroom. He then opens another door to find a darkened room filled with the sounds of farm animals and a man crying (a reference to a Motorola commercial which Murdoc appeared in). Murdoc emerges from the room and descends the stairs using a stair lift. In the living room, 2-D finds the Boogeyman reading a newspaper (while the music video for "Dare" plays on the TV). He proceeds to the kitchen and makes toast, unknowingly placing a severed human ear on his plate. At the dining table, 2-D reads a comic strip in the newspaper about Murdoc hugging him, an event that is then subverted when Murdoc arrives and strikes him with a Converse shoe. Realizing his toast has an ear on it, 2-D turns off the radio and goes outside, where he receives a notice of eviction from a baboon mailman representing James Murphy, which is based on a 2004 artwork by Hewlett titled Hog Boy. The camera pans up, revealing Russel sleeping on the roof of the house and the remains of the windmill island from the "Feel Good Inc." and "El Mañana" music videos floating in the sky.

== Track listing ==
Promotional CD single

1. "DoYaThing" (radio edit) – 4:26
2. "DoYaThing" (full-length version) – 13:04

10" Record Store Day vinyl

1. "DoYaThing" (full-length version) – 13:04

== Personnel ==
Song personnel

- James Murphy – vocals, bass guitar, synthesizer, keyboards, drums
- Damon Albarn – vocals, synthesizer, keyboards, guitar, programming
- André 3000 – vocals, keyboards, synthesizer

Video personnel

- Jamie Hewlett – director
- Passion Pictures – production
- Fortiche – animation

== Charts ==
Chart (2012)	Peak position
UK Physical Singles Chart (OCC)	35
Mexico Ingles Airplay (Billboard)	35
