= Andromeda (Gorillaz song) =

Single by Gorillaz featuring DRAM

from the album Humanz
- B-side: "Andromeda (DRAM Special)"
- Released: 23 March 2017
- Genre: Electropop; funk
- Length: 3:17
- Label: Parlophone; Warner Bros.
- Songwriter(s): Damon Albarn; Shelley Massenburg-Smith
- Producer(s): Gorillaz; Remi Kabaka Jr.; The Twilite Tone

Gorillaz singles chronology
"Ascension" (2017)	"Andromeda" (2017)	"Let Me Out" (2017)

DRAM singles chronology
"Cash Machine" (2016)	"Andromeda" (2017)	"I'm On 3.0" (2017)

Audio
- "Andromeda" on YouTube

"Andromeda" is a song by British virtual band Gorillaz, featuring American rapper DRAM, the song was released on 23 March 2017. It was released as the fourth single from their fifth studio album Humanz. It was nominated for Best Dance Recording at the 2018 Grammy Awards.

== Composition and recording ==
"Andromeda" is set in the key of A minor and moves at a tempo of 130.101 beats per minute.

Damon Albarn has said that "Andromeda" is a song very personal to him; Andromeda itself is the name of a Colchester nightclub that Albarn often visited in his youth. Speaking on the Andromeda nightclub, Albarn said: "It was the only place in the whole of the town that played soul music, so there's a connection between the music I used to hear there and the feeling and spirit of the music I was trying to evoke."

"Andromeda" is dedicated to Ethel, mother of Albarn's longtime partner Suzi Winstanley, who died while Albarn was writing the song. Ethel's death reminded Albarn of Bobby Womack, with whom Albarn had collaborated on Plastic Beach and Womack's The Bravest Man in the Universe, and who died in June 2014. The sentimentality Albarn felt for lost family and friends was instrumental in the creation of "Andromeda", with Albarn commenting on the song's message: "Take the worst possible outcome, be brave, and remember all the goodness that preceded that... all the beauty that preceded that."

Albarn also stated that after a conversation with producer The Twilite Tone, he tried to evoke the sound of Michael Jackson's 1983 single "Billie Jean" from his iconic Thriller and Hall and Oates' single "I Can't Go for That (No Can Do)", from their album Private Eyes. Twilite Tone produced the song, while Albarn took care of lyrics, The song features rapper DRAM, who also has uncredited backing vocals on the single "We Got the Power". DRAM originally had a more prominent feature on the song, with a full chorus and verse, however, Albarn stripped the vocals back as the song felt more complete. At one point, the song's name was "I Can't Go for Billie Jean", as a reference to the aforementioned Michael Jackson and Hall & Oates songs.

Albarn also revealed that there were alternate versions of the song that he felt "Just didn't work out", such as a collaboration with English singer Rag'n'Bone Man, who appears on the song "The Apprentice" on the deluxe version of the album and a failed collaboration with French singer-songwriter Christine and the Queens, however, he ultimately opted for the collaboration with DRAM.

The music video features the planet from the Saturnz Barz video.

== Track listing ==
Digital release single

1. "Andromeda" – 3:17

== Personnel ==
- Damon Albarn – vocals, synthesizer
- DRAM – vocals
- The Twilite Tone – synthesizer, drums
- Stephen Sedgwick – engineering
- Samuel Egglenton – assistant
- John Davis – engineering
- Roses Gabor – additional vocals

== Charts ==
=== Weekly charts ===
Chart (2017)	Peak position
Belgium (Ultratip Bubbling Under Flanders)	1
Belgium (Ultratip Bubbling Under Wallonia)	24
France (SNEP)	121
New Zealand Heatseekers (RMNZ)	7
US Hot Dance/Electronic Songs (Billboard)	16
US Hot Rock & Alternative Songs (Billboard)	9

=== Year-end charts ===
Chart (2017)	Position
US Hot Dance/Electronic Songs (Billboard)	60
US Hot Rock Songs (Billboard)	80
