= Hollywood (Gorillaz song) =

Single by Gorillaz featuring Snoop Dogg and Jamie Principle

from the album The Now Now
- Released: 21 June 2018
- Recorded: 2017–2018
- Studio: Studio 13, London; The Compound, Los Angeles, CA; Mondrian Hotel, West Hollywood, CA
- Genre: Funk; hip hop; electropop
- Length: 4:53
- Label: Parlophone; Warner Bros.
- Songwriter(s): Damon Albarn; Calvin Broadus Jr.; Jamie Principle
- Producer(s): Gorillaz; James Ford; Remi Kabaka Jr.

Gorillaz singles chronology
"Fire Flies" (2018)	"Hollywood" (2018)	"Tranz" (2018)

Snoop Dogg singles chronology
"One More Day" (2018)	"Hollywood" (2018)	"Smile Bitch" (2018)

Jamie Principle singles chronology
"Touch Your Body" (2016)	"Hollywood" (2018)

Audio sample
- file; help

Visualiser
- "Hollywood" on YouTube

"Hollywood" is a song by British virtual band Gorillaz featuring American rapper Snoop Dogg and American house musician Jamie Principle. It was released on 21 June 2018, as the fifth single from their sixth studio album, The Now Now.

== Pre-release ==
The original demo for the song was recorded in late 2017 at the Mondrian Hotel in West Hollywood, California, while the band was on the Humanz Tour, with additional recording occurring at The Compound in Los Angeles and Studio 13 in London. Its existence was first made public during an October 2017 interview with Gorillaz creator Damon Albarn, where he stated that it had been rehearsed for a potential live performance, and the band played it during their soundcheck in Atlanta, but that he and the Gorillaz live band did not believe it was ready. Due to this, the song did not make its début until March of the following year, when it was performed at a concert in Santiago, Chile. Snoop Dogg was not present; his vocals were provided through a backing track.

== Visualiser ==
The modified Hollywood sign seen at the end of the video

The visualiser for the song begins with a spinning visual depicting the virtual members of Gorillaz against a moving spiral background, a feature used in visualisers for other songs on the album. However, unlike these, the video's visuals have their own unique red-green color scheme. During Jamie Principle's section of the song, the center of the spinning visual flashes select words from his lyrics. During the chorus sections, an animation of fictional Gorillaz frontman 2-D singing against red-and-green-tinted footage of a generic cityscape and a sequence consisting of words from the chorus flashing against a black background are interspersed. However, during Snoop Dogg's section, he is shown rapping in live-action form (albeit in black and white like 2-D) against the same cityscape footage. Towards the end of the song, the spinning visual can be seen once again zooming out into the background. Just before the video ends, a modified Hollywood sign reading "GORILLAZ" is shown.

== Personnel ==
- Damon Albarn – vocals, synthesiser, guitar
- Jamie Principle – vocals
- Snoop Dogg – vocals
- James Ford – bass guitar, drums
- Karl Vanden Bossche – percussion
- Remi Kabaka Jr. – drum programming
- Samuel Egglenton – assistant engineer
- Stephen Sedgwick – mixing engineer, recording engineer

== Charts ==
Chart (2018)	Peak position
US Hot Rock & Alternative Songs (Billboard)	26
