= The Twilite Tone =

American record producer and DJ

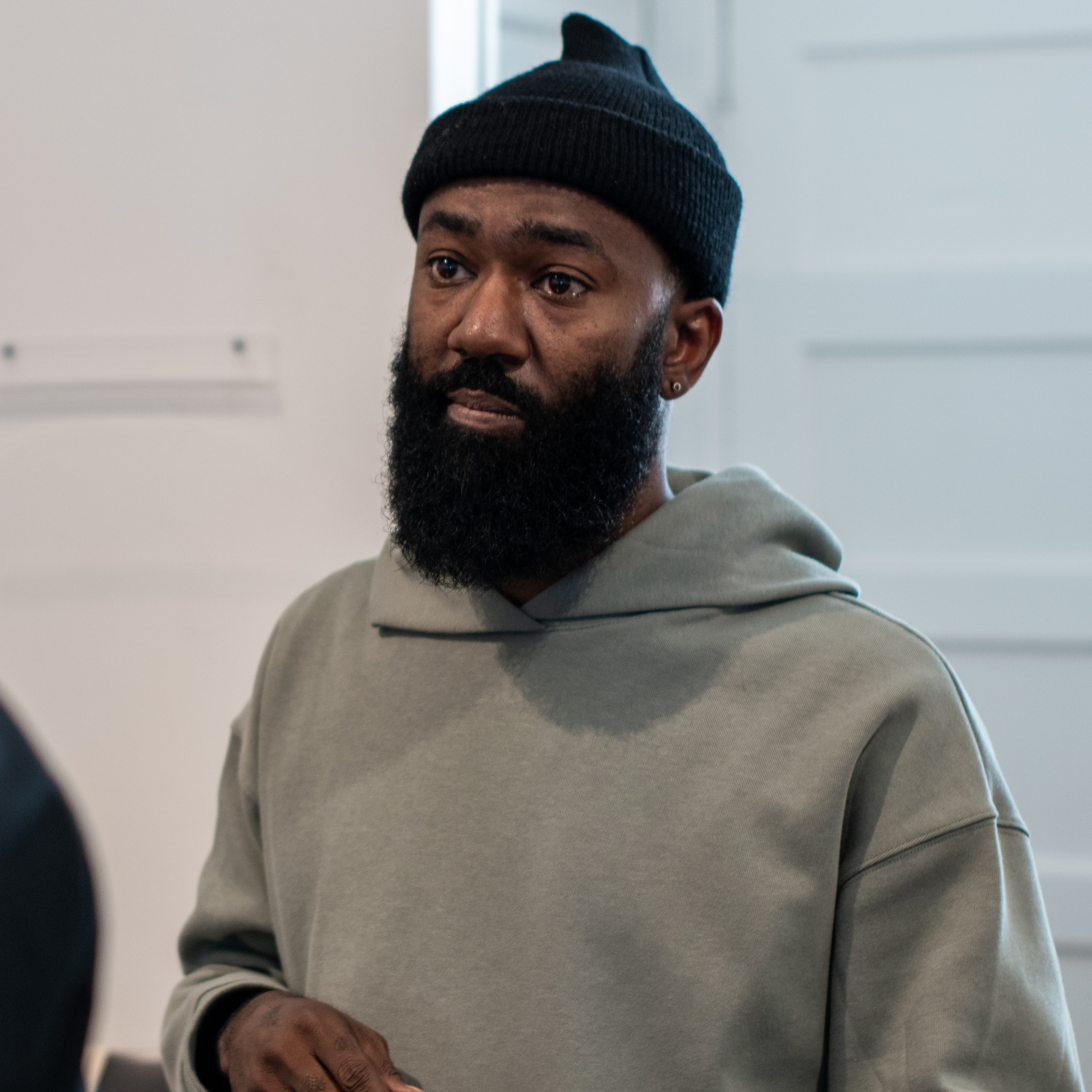
- The Twilite Tone in 2020

Background information
- Also known as: Ynot the Best; Master Ynot NeverTheLess; Master Khan; Great Weekend; Two, Two(2!2!)
- Born: Anthony Christopher Craig; July 13, 1971 (age 54); Chicago, Illinois, U.S.
- Genres: Electronic; house; hip-hop; R&B; soul
- Occupations: Record producer; rapper; songwriter; disc jockey; radio host; composer
- Years active: 1987–present
- Labels: Stones Throw; Rush Hour; UNO NYC; Throne of Blood; Wurst; Do-Over; Brownswood; GOOD; Downtown; Dance Mania; Muzique; Relativity; Sony; MCA; Def Jam; Warner Bros.; Parlophone; Ubiquity; ABB; BBE\Puma 5X12; Frank Radio
- Website: soundcloud.com/thetwilitetone

Anthony Christopher Khan (né Craig; born July 13, 1971), known by his stage name the Twilite Tone, is an American record producer, rapper, DJ, and radio host. He has worked with Kendrick Lamar, Gorillaz, Kanye West, Common, Big Sean, John Legend, My Brightest Diamond and U-God among others.

== Early life ==
Tone was born in Chicago, Illinois, United States, to parents Indria Khan and Anthony Christopher Craig. Tone was born with the surname Craig (his father's name), which was later changed to Khan, his family's surname. He was influenced by his uncle, Hassan Khan, who married Chaka Khan in 1970. Tone is a cousin of jazz bassist Richard Davis. He learned to play the trumpet in 3rd grade, and soon after learned to play percussion instruments. He was the drum section leader in his high school band, and DJ'd for the first time as a sophomore at a Kenwood Academy event.

== Career ==
Tone was first introduced to NO I.D. and Chicago rapper Common in 1987, and soon became the DJ for both in their collective group "CDR". The group recorded an LP together and it was released in 1989, under the name 1015 or 326 later dubbed Dion & Tony.

In 1989, Tone met two dancers, Reggie and Clay, and together they formed Dem Dare (a.k.a. Darians), to promote both house and hip-hop events. Tone DJ'd at the first show Dem Dare promoted, which took place at Club Alcatraz in Chicago. During this period Tone created the term Go-Ill and Chic-Chic, as reference for Chicago. In 1990, Tone started working on Common demos.

In 1992, Tone produced Can I Borrow a Dollar the debut album by Common (then known as Common Sense), contributing to 12 of the album's 13 tracks. Tone, along with co-producer No I.D. produced the first and best-charting single was 1992's "Take It EZ". It reached No. 5 on the Hot Rap Singles chart while his next two singles, "Breaker 1/9"" and "Soul by the Pound" reached No. 10 and No. 7 respectively.

In 1993, Tone produced "Can I Bust", which was the first time that Tone rhymed on a record.

In 1994, Tone, under the alias Ynot (Master Ynot Never The Less), produced "Chapter 13" and "Sum Shit I Wrote" off Common's album Resurrection. Tone was also featured on Chapter 13 rapping under the name Ynot.

In 1997, Tone produced the track "Reminding Me (Of Sef)" off of Common's One Day It'll All Make Sense album.

From 1995 until 2000, Tone focused on DJing. In 1999, he produced and rhymed on a track called "Get The Doe", which had ears buzzing and wanting to hear a full LP from Tone.

In 2006, Tone moved to New York, and continued heavy on the DJ scene, while getting back into mainstream production. From 2007 to 2009, Tone executive-produced, mixed, and produced two tracks of U-God third solo album Dopium, which features Rims Poking Out and Hips.

In 2010, Tone produced the Just Write Mixtape series for the movie, starring Queen Latifah and Common.

In 2012, Tone co-produced and co-wrote three tracks on Kanye West's & GOOD Music's Cruel Summer "Don't Like", and "The One" and the lead single "Mercy.

In 2013, Tone contributed on the tracks "MILF" and "Mona Lisa" on Big Sean’s second album, Hall of Fame, released by GOOD Music and Def Jam Recordings. He also produced "Who Do We Think We Are" and "What If I Told You (Interlude)" on John Legend's Grammy-nominated album, Love in the Future. Continuing on his GOOD Music stretch, Tone contributed to Pusha T's "Nosetalgia" featuring Kendrick Lamar, from the album My Name Is My Name.

In 2015, Tone produced "Put the Guns Down", to inspire the city's youth to end gun violence in Chicago, with an all-star cast featuring Common, King Louie, G Herbo, Katie Got Bandz, Saba, Tree, Noname, Mic Terror, and Nick Jr. of Treated Crew.

In 2016, Tone was selected from a handful of names to co-produce Gorillaz's 2017 album, Humanz, and is credited with production on all 19 of the album's tracks. Footage of Tone's involvement with Gorillaz is featured in the 2019 Gorillaz documentary film Reject False Icons.

In 2018, My Brightest Diamond announced the release of a new album to be co-produced by The Twilite Tone.

In 2020, The Twilite Tone released his debut solo album The Clearing on Stones Throw. The Clearing showcases a sound that The Twilite Tone describes as "trans-genre" — a mixture of house, electronic funk, and instrumental hip-hop that continues Stones Throw's beatmaker legacy — informed by the musical history and spirit of his home town.

== Selected discography ==
Year	Single	Artist	Label	Credit
1988	Gene Hunt presents Chicago Dance Tracks	Dion and Tony		Producer
1992	Can I Borrow a Dollar?	Common	Relativity	Producer
1992	Take it EZ	Common	Relativity	Co-Producer
1992	Breaker 1/9	Common	Relativity	Producer
1992	Soul by the Pound	Common	Relativity	Producer
1993	Can I Bust	Common	Relativity	Producer
1994	Sum Shit I wrote	Common	Relativity	Producer
1994	Chapter 13 (Rich Man Vs. Poor Man)	Common	Relativity	Recorded as Ynot
1997	Reminding Me of Self	Common	Relativity	Producer
1999	Get the Doe Theme	The Twilight Tone	Released Digitally	Rhymes, producer
2009	Hip	U-God	Babygrande	Producer
2009	Rims Pokin Out	U-God	BabyGrande	Producer
2010	Just Write mixtape series	Queen Latifah and Common	Released Digitally various websites	Producer
2012	Don't Like	Kanye West	GOOD Def Jam	Co-Producer
2012	The One	Kanye West	GOOD Def Jam	Co-Producer
2012	Mercy	Kanye West	GOOD Def Jam	Co-Producer
2013	MILF	Big Sean	GOOD Def Jam	Co-Producer
2013	Mona Lisa	Big Sean	GOOD Def Jam	Co-Producer
2013	Who Do We Think We Are	John Legend	GOOD Def Jam	Co-Producer
2013	What If I told you	John Legend	GOOD Def Jam	Producer
2013	Nosetalgia	Pusha T	GOOD Def Jam	Contributor
2015	Put The Guns Down	Common, King Louie, G Herbo, Katie Got Bandz, Saba, Tree, No Name Gypsy, Mic Terror, & Nick Jr. of Treated Crew		Producer
2017	Hallelujah Money	Gorillaz and Benjamin Clementine	Warner Bros.	Producer
2017	Andromeda	Gorillaz and DRAM	Warner Bros.	Producer
2017	Saturnz Barz	Gorillaz and Popcaan	Warner Bros.	Producer
2017	We Got the Power	Gorillaz, Jehnny Beth and Noel Gallagher	Warner Bros.	Producer
2017	Busted and Blue	Gorillaz	Warner Bros.	Producer
2017	Ascension	Gorillaz and Vince Staples	Warner Bros.	Producer
2018	Champagne	My Brightest Diamond	Rhyme & Reason Records	Co-producer
2020	The Clearing	The Twilite Tone	Stones Throw Records	Artist/Producer
2021	Praise God	Kanye West, Travis Scott, Baby Keem	GOOD Def Jam	Co-Producer
2021	Life of the Party	Kanye West, Andre 3000	GOOD Def Jam	Co-Producer
