= Gorillaz discography =

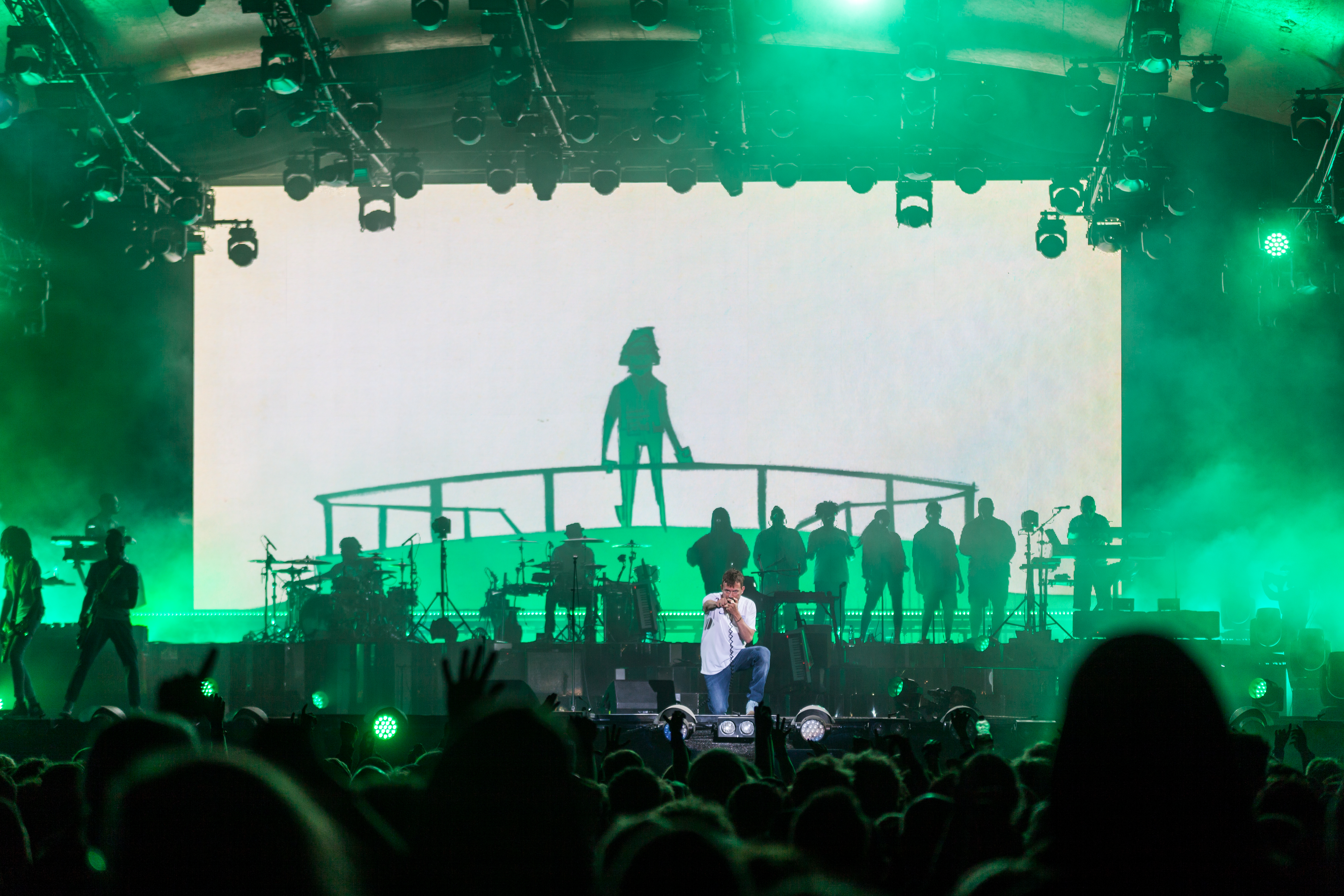
- Gorillaz performing at Roskilde Festival, 2018
- Studio albums: 9
- Extended plays: 11
- Live albums: 1
- Compilation albums: 3
- Singles: 51
- Video albums: 4
- Music videos: 36
- Remix albums: 1

The discography of British virtual band Gorillaz consists of nine studio albums, three compilation albums, 11 extended plays, one remix album, and 51 singles.

Gorillaz were formed in 1998 by Damon Albarn of alternative rock band Blur, and Jamie Hewlett, co-creator of the comic book Tank Girl. In 2001, the band released their first studio album, Gorillaz, followed by Demon Days in 2005, Plastic Beach in 2010, The Fall in 2011, Humanz in 2017, The Now Now in 2018, Song Machine, Season One: Strange Timez in 2020, Cracker Island in 2023, and The Mountain in 2026. In November 2011, Gorillaz released The Singles Collection 2001–2011. In August 2021, Gorillaz released their Meanwhile EP. As of 2021, Gorillaz have accumulated 3,872,838 album sales in the UK.

== Albums ==
=== Studio albums ===
List of studio albums, with selected chart positions, sales figures and certifications
Title	Album details	Peak chart positions										Sales	Certifications
Title	Album details	UK	AUS	AUT	CAN	FRA	GER	IRL	NZ	SWI	US	Sales	Certifications
Gorillaz	Released: 26 March 2001 (UK); Label: Parlophone, Virgin; Formats: CD, LP, cassette, digital download	3	17	3	13	7	3	6	2	6	14	UK: 974,311 (Note: Sales as of March 2021); US: 1,900,000 (Note: Sales as of January 2010)	BPI: 3× Platinum; ARIA: Platinum; BVMI: Gold; IFPI AUT: Gold; IFPI SWI: Platinum; MC: Platinum; RIAA: Platinum; RMNZ: 2× Platinum; SNEP: Platinum
Demon Days	Released: 11 May 2005 (JP), 23 May 2005 (UK); Label: Parlophone, Virgin; Formats: CD, LP, cassette, digital download	1	2	3	5	1	2	2	3	1	6	UK: 2,053,211 (Note: Sales as of March 2026); US: 2,200,000	BPI: 6× Platinum; ARIA: 3× Platinum; BVMI: 3× Gold; IFPI AUT: Platinum; IFPI SWI: Gold; IRMA: 5× Platinum; MC: 2× Platinum; RIAA: 2× Platinum; RMNZ: 6× Platinum; SNEP: Platinum
Plastic Beach	Released: 3 March 2010 (JP), 8 March 2010 (UK); Label: Parlophone, Virgin; Formats: CD, LP, digital download	2	1	1	3	2	3	4	4	2	2	UK: 345,223 (Note: Sales as of May 2017)	BPI: Platinum; ARIA: Gold; BVMI: Gold; IRMA: Gold; MC: Gold; RMNZ: Platinum; SNEP: Platinum
The Fall	Released: 25 December 2010 (digital), 19 April 2011 (UK); Label: Parlophone, Virgin; Formats: CD, LP, digital download	12	41	33	24	20	43	21	—	13	24	UK: 30,272	
Humanz	Released: 28 April 2017; Label: Parlophone, Warner Bros.; Formats: CD, LP, digital download	2	4	1	2	2	3	2	3	1	2		BPI: Gold; MC: Gold; RMNZ: Gold; SNEP: Gold
The Now Now	Released: 29 June 2018; Label: Parlophone, Warner Bros.; Formats: CD, LP, cassette, digital download	5	4	8	4	6	10	4	9	3	4		BPI: Silver
Song Machine, Season One: Strange Timez	Released: 23 October 2020; Label: Parlophone, Warner; Formats: CD, LP, cassette, digital download	2	5	9	18	19	9	2	5	8	12		BPI: Silver
Cracker Island	Released: 24 February 2023; Label: Parlophone, Warner; Formats: CD, LP, cassette, digital download	1	2	3	6	3	2	1	1	4	3		BPI: Silver
The Mountain	Released: 27 February 2026; Label: Kong; Formats: CD, LP, cassette, digital download	1	4	2	15	4	2	1	3	1	7		BPI: Silver
"—" denotes a recording that did not chart in that territory.

=== Live albums ===
List of live albums, with selected chart positions
Title	Album details	Peak chart positions			
Title	Album details	UK	NLD	SCO	US Sales
Demon Days (Live from the Apollo Theater)	Released: 12 April 2025; Label: Parlophone; Format: 2×LP	91	37	14	25

=== Compilation albums ===
List of compilation albums, with selected chart positions
Title	Album details	Peak chart positions										Certifications
Title	Album details	UK	AUS	AUT	BEL	CAN	FRA	IRL	NZ	SWI	US	Certifications
G-Sides	Released: 12 December 2001 (JP), 11 March 2002 (UK); Label: Parlophone, Virgin; Formats: CD, LP, cassette, digital download	65	—	24	—	—	—	—	28	95	84	BPI: Silver
D-Sides	Released: 19 November 2007 (UK); Label: Parlophone, Virgin; Formats: CD, LP, cassette, digital download	63	—	—	—	—	102	—	—	66	71	
The Singles Collection 2001–2011	Released: 28 November 2011; Label: Parlophone, Virgin; Formats: CD, LP, digital download	42	85	—	54	161	111	21	32	—	— (Note: The Singles Collection 2001–2011 did not enter the Billboard 200, but peaked at number 25 on the Top Alternative Albums, 20 on Tastemaker Albums, 37 on Top Rock Albums and 8 on Vinyl Albums.)	BPI: Platinum; RMNZ: Gold
"—" denotes a recording that did not chart or was not released in that territory.

=== Remix albums ===
List of remix albums, with selected chart positions
Title	Album details	Peak chart positions		
Title	Album details	UK	FRA	US
Laika Come Home (with Spacemonkeyz)	Released: 1 July 2002 (UK); Label: Parlophone, EMI, Astralwerks, Caroline, Virgin; Formats: CD, LP, cassette, digital download	108	118	156

=== Video albums ===
List of video albums, with selected chart positions and certifications
Title	Album details	Peak chart positions			Certifications
Title	Album details	UK Video	AUS DVD	US Video	Certifications
Phase One: Celebrity Take Down	Released: 18 November 2002 (UK); Label: Parlophone, Virgin; Format: DVD	15	—	28	
Demon Days Live	Released: 27 March 2006 (UK); Label: Parlophone, Virgin; Format: DVD	3	5	11	BPI: Gold; ARIA: Gold
Phase Two: Slowboat to Hades	Released: 25 October 2006 (JP), 30 October 2006 (UK); Label: Parlophone, Virgin; Format: DVD	4	—	—	
Bananaz	Released: 20 April 2009 (UK); Label: Parlophone, Virgin; Format: DVD	14	—	—	
"—" denotes a recording that did not chart or was not released in that territory.

== Extended plays ==
List of extended plays, with selected chart positions
Title	Extended play details	Peak chart positions
Title	Extended play details	US
Tomorrow Comes Today	Released: 27 November 2000 (UK); Label: EMI; Format: CD	—
Feel Good Inc. EP	Released: 9 May 2005; Label: Parlophone; Format: Digital download	—
iTunes Session	Released: 22 October 2010; Label: Parlophone, Virgin; Format: Digital download	154
A Solar Collaboration	Released: 2018; Not on label; Format: Vinyl, streaming	—
Song Machine, Ep. 1	Released: 30 January 2020; Label: Parlophone, Warner; Format: Digital download, streaming	—
Song Machine, Ep. 2	Released: 27 February 2020; Label: Parlophone, Warner; Format: Digital download, streaming	—
Song Machine, Ep. 3	Released: 9 April 2020; Label: Parlophone, Warner; Format: Digital download, streaming	—
Song Machine, Ep. 4	Released: 9 June 2020; Label: Parlophone, Warner; Format: Digital download, streaming	—
Song Machine, Ep. 5	Released: 20 July 2020; Label: Parlophone, Warner; Format: Digital download, streaming	—
Song Machine, Ep. 6	Released: 9 September 2020; Label: Parlophone, Warner; Format: Digital download, streaming	—
Song Machine, Ep. 7	Released: 1 October 2020; Label: Parlophone, Warner; Format: Digital download, streaming	—
Song Machine, Ep. 8	Released: 5 November 2020; Label: Parlophone, Warner; Format: Digital download, streaming	—
Meanwhile EP	Released: 26 August 2021; Label: Parlophone; Format: Digital download, streaming	—
"—" denotes a recording that did not chart or was not released in that territory.

== Singles ==
List of singles, with selected chart positions and certifications, showing year released and album name
Title	Year	Peak chart positions										Certifications	Album
Title	Year	UK	AUS	BEL	GER	IRL	ITA	NLD	NZ	SWI	US	Certifications	Album
"Clint Eastwood" (featuring Del the Funky Homosapien)	2001	4	17	11	2	5	1	26	12	3	57	BPI: 2× Platinum; ARIA: Gold; BVMI: Gold; FIMI: Gold; IFPI SWI: Gold; RMNZ: 3× Platinum	Gorillaz
"19-2000"	2001	6	39	30	29	26	21	42	1	36	—	BPI: Gold; RMNZ: Gold	Gorillaz
"Rock the House" (featuring Del the Funky Homosapien)	2001	18	—	— (Note: "Rock the House" did not enter the Ultratop 50, but peaked at number 17 on the Ultratip chart.)	90	—	—	—	—	—	—		Gorillaz
"911" (with D12 & featuring Terry Hall)	2001	—	—	—	—	—	—	—	—	—	—		Bad Company: Music from the Motion Picture
"Tomorrow Comes Today"	2002	33	—	—	—	—	—	—	—	—	—		Gorillaz
"Lil' Dub Chefin'" (with Spacemonkeyz)	2002	73	—	—	—	—	—	—	—	—	—		Laika Come Home
"Feel Good Inc." (featuring De La Soul)	2005	2	3	36	8	4	5	87	2	12	14	BPI: 5× Platinum; ARIA: Platinum; BVMI: 3× Gold; FIMI: Platinum; RIAA: Gold; RMNZ: 8× Platinum	Demon Days
"Dare" (featuring Shaun Ryder)	2005	1	11	— (Note: "Dare" did not enter the Ultratop 50, but peaked at number two on the Ultratip chart.)	37	7	11	98	5	22	87	BPI: 2× Platinum; ARIA: Gold; RMNZ: 3× Platinum	Demon Days
"Dirty Harry" (featuring Bootie Brown)	2005	6	15	— (Note: "Dirty Harry" did not enter the Ultratop 50, but peaked at number eight on the Ultratip chart.)	77	19	26	100	—	88	—	BPI: Platinum; RMNZ: Platinum	Demon Days
"Kids with Guns" / "El Mañana"	2006	27	31	—	94	39	—	—	—	—	—	BPI: Silver; RMNZ: Gold	Demon Days
"Stylo" (featuring Bobby Womack and Mos Def)	2010	—	48	25	63	—	37	56	—	56	— (Note: "Stylo" did not enter the Billboard Hot 100, but peaked at number 3 on the Bubbling Under Hot 100 Singles chart, which acts as a 25-song extension to the Hot 100.)		Plastic Beach
"Superfast Jellyfish" (featuring Gruff Rhys and De La Soul)	2010	—	—	—	—	—	—	—	—	—	—		Plastic Beach
"On Melancholy Hill"	2010	78	94	— (Note: "On Melancholy Hill" did not enter the Ultratop 50, but peaked at number 22 on the Ultratip chart.)	—	—	—	—	—	— (Note: "On Melancholy Hill" did not enter the Swiss Singles chart, but charted at number 85 on the Swiss Airplay chart.)	— (Note: "On Melancholy Hill" did not enter the Billboard Hot 100, but peaked at number 2 on the Hot Singles Sales chart.)	BPI: Platinum; RMNZ: 2× Platinum	Plastic Beach
"Doncamatic" (featuring Daley)	2010	37	60	— (Note: "Donchromatic" did not enter the Ultratop 50, but peaked at number 25 on the Ultratip chart.)	—	—	—	40	—	— (Note: "Doncamatic" did not enter the Swiss Singles chart, but charted at number 83 on the Swiss Airplay chart.)	—		The Singles Collection 2001–2011
"Revolving Doors" / "Amarillo"	2011	—	—	—	—	—	—	—	—	—	—		The Fall
"DoYaThing" (featuring André 3000 and James Murphy)	2012	— (Note: "DoYaThing" did not enter the UK Singles Chart, but peaked at number 35 on the UK Physical Singles Chart.)	—	—	—	—	—	—	—	—	—		Non-album single
"Saturnz Barz" (featuring Popcaan)	2017	87	—	—	—	88	—	—	— (Note: "Saturnz Barz" did not enter the NZ Top 40 Singles Chart, but peaked at number five on the NZ Heatseeker Singles Chart.)	—	— (Note: "Saturn Barz" did not enter the Billboard Hot 100, but peaked at number 1 on the Bubbling Under Hot 100 Singles chart, which acts as a 25-song extension to the Hot 100.)	BPI: Silver	Humanz
"We Got the Power" (featuring Jehnny Beth)	2017	— (Note: "We Got the Power" did not enter the UK Singles Chart, but peaked at number 78 on the UK Singles Sales Chart.)	—	— (Note: "We Got the Power" did not enter the Ultratop 50, but charted as an "extra tip" on the Ultratip chart.)	—	—	—	—	—	—	—		Humanz
"Ascension" (featuring Vince Staples)	2017	91	—	—	—	89	—	—	—	—	—		Humanz
"Andromeda" (featuring DRAM)	2017	— (Note: "Andromeda" did not enter the UK Singles Chart, but peaked at number 79 on the UK Video Streaming Chart.)	—	— (Note: "Andromeda" did not enter the Ultratop 50, but peaked at number two on the Ultratip chart.)	—	—	—	—	— (Note: "Andromeda" did not enter the NZ Top 40 Singles Chart, but peaked at number seven on the NZ Heatseekers Singles Chart.)	— (Note: "Andromeda" did not enter the Swiss Singles chart, but charted at number 84 on the Swiss Airplay chart.)	—		Humanz
"Let Me Out" (featuring Pusha T and Mavis Staples)	2017	— (Note: "Let Me Out" did not enter the UK Singles Chart, but peaked at number 78 on the UK Singles Sales Chart.)	—	—	—	—	—	—	— (Note: "Let Me Out" did not enter the NZ Top 40 Singles Chart, but peaked at number six on the NZ Heatseekers Singles Chart.)	—	— (Note: "Let Me Out" did not enter the Billboard Hot 100, but peaked at number 15 on the Bubbling Under Hot 100 Singles chart, which acts as a 25-song extension to the Hot 100.)		Humanz
"The Apprentice" (featuring Rag'n'Bone Man, Ray BLK and Zebra Katz)	2017	— (Note: "The Apprentice" did not enter the UK Singles Chart, but peaked at number 97 on the UK Singles Sales Chart.)	—	—	—	—	—	—	—	—	—		Humanz
"Sleeping Powder"	2017	—	—	—	—	—	—	—	—	—	—		Non-album single
"Strobelite" (featuring Peven Everett)	2017	—	—	— (Note: "Strobelite" did not enter the Ultratop 50, but peaked at number 24 on the Ultratip chart.)	—	—	—	—	—	—	—		Humanz
"Garage Palace" (featuring Little Simz)	2017	—	—	— (Note: "Garage Palace" did not enter the Ultratop 50, but charted as an "extra tip" on the Ultratip chart.)	—	—	—	—	—	—	—		Humanz
"Andromeda (D.R.A.M. Special)" (featuring DRAM)	2017	—	—	—	—	—	—	—	—	—	—		Humanz
"Humility" (featuring George Benson)	2018	81	—	49	—	72	—	—	— (Note: "Humility" did not enter the NZ Top 40 Singles Chart, but peaked at number six on the NZ Heatseeker Singles Chart.)	— (Note: "Humility" did not enter the Swiss Singles chart, but charted at number 92 on the Swiss Airplay chart.)	85		The Now Now
"Lake Zurich"	2018	—	—	—	—	—	—	—	—	—	—		The Now Now
"Sorcererz"	2018	—	—	—	—	—	—	—	—	—	—		The Now Now
"Fire Flies"	2018	—	—	—	—	—	—	—	—	—	—		The Now Now
"Hollywood" (featuring Snoop Dogg and Jamie Principle)	2018	—	—	— (Note: "Hollywood" did not enter the Ultratop 50, but charted as an "extra tip" on the Ultratip chart.)	—	—	—	—	— (Note: "Hollywood" did not enter the NZ Top 40 Singles Chart, but peaked at number 33 on the NZ Hot Singles Chart.)	—	—		The Now Now
"Tranz"	2018	— (Note: "Tranz" did not enter the UK Singles Chart, but peaked at number 45 on the UK Video Streaming Chart.)	—	— (Note: "Tranz" did not enter the Ultratop 50, but charted as an "extra tip" on the Ultratip chart.)	—	91	—	—	— (Note: "Tranz" did not enter the NZ Top 40 Singles Chart, but peaked at number 22 on the NZ Hot Singles Chart.)	—	—		The Now Now
"Momentary Bliss" (featuring Slowthai and Slaves)	2020	58	—	— (Note: "Momentary Bliss" did not enter the Ultratop 50, but peaked at number 29 on the Ultratip chart.)	—	74	—	—	— (Note: "Momentary Bliss" did not enter the NZ Top 40 Singles Chart, but peaked at number 17 on the NZ Hot Singles Chart.)	—	—		Song Machine, Season One: Strange Timez
"Désolé" (featuring Fatoumata Diawara)	2020	—	—	— (Note: "Désolé" did not enter the Ultratop 50, but peaked at number 34 on the Ultratip chart.)	—	—	—	—	—	—	—		Song Machine, Season One: Strange Timez
"Aries" (featuring Peter Hook and Georgia)	2020	—	—	— (Note: "Aries" did not enter the Ultratop 50, but peaked at number 42 on the Ultratip chart.)	—	—	—	—	— (Note: "Aries" did not enter the NZ Top 40 Singles Chart, but peaked at number 29 on the NZ Hot Singles Chart.)	—	—		Song Machine, Season One: Strange Timez
"How Far?" (featuring Tony Allen and Skepta)	2020	—	—	— (Note: "How Far?" did not enter the Ultratop 50, but charted as an "extra tip" on the Ultratip chart.)	—	—	—	—	—	—	—		Song Machine, Season One: Strange Timez
"Friday 13th" (featuring Octavian)	2020	—	—	— (Note: "Friday 13th" did not enter the Ultratop 50, but charted as an "extra tip" on the Ultratip chart.)	—	—	—	—	—	—	—		Song Machine, Season One: Strange Timez
"Pac-Man" (featuring Schoolboy Q)	2020	—	—	—	—	—	—	—	— (Note: "Pac-Man" did not enter the NZ Top 40 Singles Chart, but peaked at number 30 on the NZ Hot Singles Chart.)	—	—		Song Machine, Season One: Strange Timez
"Strange Timez" (featuring Robert Smith)	2020	—	—	— (Note: "Strange Timez" did not enter the Ultratop 50, but charted as an "extra tip" on the Ultratip chart.)	—	—	—	—	— (Note: "Strange Timez" did not enter the NZ Top 40 Singles Chart, but peaked at number 36 on the NZ Hot Singles Chart.)	—	—		Song Machine, Season One: Strange Timez
"The Pink Phantom" (featuring Elton John and 6lack)	2020	—	—	— (Note: "The Pink Phantom" did not enter the Ultratop 50, but charted as an "extra tip" on the Ultratip chart.)	—	—	—	—	—	—	—		Song Machine, Season One: Strange Timez
"The Valley of the Pagans" (featuring Beck)	2020	—	—	— (Note: "The Valley of the Pagans" did not enter the Ultratop 50, but peaked at number 31 on the Ultratip chart.)	—	—	—	—	— (Note: "The Valley of the Pagans" did not enter the Official New Zealand Music Chart, but peaked at number 27 on the Hot 40 Singles chart.)	—	—		Song Machine, Season One: Strange Timez
"Cracker Island" (featuring Thundercat)	2022	94	—	—	—	97	—	—	— (Note: "Cracker Island" did not enter the NZ Top 40 Singles Chart, but peaked at number 37 on the NZ Hot Singles Chart.)	—	—		Cracker Island
"New Gold" (featuring Tame Impala and Bootie Brown)	2022	56	44	—	—	36	—	— (Note: "New Gold" did not enter the Dutch Single Top 100, but peaked at number seven on the Single Tip chart.)	— (Note: "New Gold" did not enter the NZ Top 40 Singles Chart, but peaked at number two on the NZ Hot Singles Chart.)	—	— (Note: "New Gold" did not enter the Billboard Hot 100, but peaked at number four on the Bubbling Under Hot 100 Singles chart, which acts as a 25-song extension to the Hot 100.)	BPI: Silver; RMNZ: Platinum	Cracker Island
"Baby Queen"	2022	—	—	—	—	—	—	—	— (Note: "Baby Queen" did not enter the NZ Top 40 Singles Chart, but peaked at number 21 on the NZ Hot Singles Chart.)	—	—		Cracker Island
"Skinny Ape"	2022	—	—	—	—	—	—	—	—	—	—		Cracker Island
"Silent Running" (featuring Adeleye Omotayo)	2023	97	—	—	—	—	—	—	—	—	—		Cracker Island
"The Happy Dictator" (featuring Sparks)	2025	73	—	—	—	77	—	—	— (Note: "The Happy Dictator" did not enter the NZ Top 40 Singles Chart, but peaked at number 13 on the NZ Hot Singles Chart.)	—	—		The Mountain
"The Manifesto" (featuring Trueno and Proof)	2025	—	—	—	—	—	—	—	— (Note: "The Manifesto" did not enter the NZ Top 40 Singles Chart, but peaked at number 34 on the NZ Hot Singles Chart.)	—	—		The Mountain
"The God of Lying" (featuring Idles)	2025	—	—	—	—	—	—	—	— (Note: "The God of Lying" did not enter the NZ Top 40 Singles Chart, but peaked at number 19 on the NZ Hot Singles Chart.)	—	—		The Mountain
"Damascus" (featuring Omar Souleyman and Yasiin Bey)	2025	—	—	—	—	—	—	—	— (Note: "Damascus" did not enter the NZ Top 40 Singles Chart, but peaked at number 29 on the NZ Hot Singles Chart.)	—	—		The Mountain
"The Hardest Thing" (featuring Tony Allen) / "Orange County" (featuring Bizarrap, Kara Jackson, and Anoushka Shankar)	2026	— (Note: "The Hardest Thing" did not enter the UK Singles Chart, but peaked at number 26 on the UK Singles Sales Chart.)	—	—	—	—	—	—	—	—	—		The Mountain
"The Hardest Thing" (featuring Tony Allen) / "Orange County" (featuring Bizarrap, Kara Jackson, and Anoushka Shankar)	2026	94	—	—	—	—	—	—	— (Note: "Orange County" did not enter the NZ Top 40 Singles Chart, but peaked at number 19 on the NZ Hot Singles Chart.)	—	—		The Mountain
"—" denotes a recording that did not chart or was not released in that territory.

== Other charted and certified songs ==
List of other charted songs
Title	Year	Peak chart positions										Certifications	Album
Title	Year	UK	IRL	LTU	MEX	NZ Hot	PER	SPA	US	US Rock	WW	Certifications	Album
"White Flag" (with Bashy and Kano)	2010	— (Note: "White Flag" did not enter the UK Singles Chart, but peaked at number 24 on the UK Physical Singles Chart.)	—	—	—	—	—	—	— (Note: "White Flag" did not enter the Billboard Hot 100 or Bubbling Under Hot 100 Singles charts, but peaked at number 24 on the Hot Singles Sales chart.)	—	—		Plastic Beach
"Rhinestone Eyes"	2010	—	—	—	—	—	—	—	—	— (Note: "Rhinestone Eyes" did not enter the Hot Rock Songs chart, but peaked at number 49 on the Rock Digital Songs chart.)	—	BPI: Gold; RMNZ: Platinum	Plastic Beach
"Momentz" (featuring De La Soul)	2017	—	—	—	—	—	—	—	—	20	—		Humanz
"Submission" (featuring Kelela and Danny Brown)	2017	—	—	—	—	—	—	—	—	21	—		Humanz
"Charger" (featuring Grace Jones)	2017	—	—	—	—	—	—	—	—	28	—		Humanz
"Busted and Blue"	2017	—	—	—	—	—	—	—	—	27	—		Humanz
"Carnival" (featuring Anthony Hamilton)	2017	—	—	—	—	—	—	—	—	42	—		Humanz
"Sex Murder Party" (featuring Jamie Principle and Zebra Katz)	2017	—	—	—	—	—	—	—	—	47	—		Humanz
"She's My Collar" (featuring Kali Uchis)	2017	—	—	95	—	—	—	—	—	36	—	BPI: Silver; RMNZ: Gold	Humanz
"Kansas"	2018	—	—	—	—	33	—	—	—	37	—		The Now Now
"Meanwhile" (featuring Jelani Blackman and Barrington Levy)	2021	— (Note: "Meanwhile" did not enter the UK Singles Chart, but peaked at number 76 on the UK Singles Sales Chart.)	—	—	—	—	—	—	—	—	—		Meanwhile EP
"Oil" (featuring Stevie Nicks)	2023	— (Note: "Oil" did not enter the UK Singles Chart, but peaked at number 74 on the UK Singles Sales Chart.)	—	—	—	12	—	—	—	32	—		Cracker Island
"The Tired Influencer"	2023	—	—	—	—	26	—	—	—	46	—		Cracker Island
"Tormenta" (featuring Bad Bunny)	2023	—	—	—	11	18	6	20	— (Note: "Tormenta" did not enter the Billboard Hot 100, but peaked at number one on the Bubbling Under Hot 100 Singles chart, which acts as a 25-song extension to the Hot 100.)	9	33	PROMUSICAE: Gold	Cracker Island
"Whiskey (Release Me)" (A$AP Rocky featuring Gorillaz and Westside Gunn)	2026	—	—	71	—	—	—	—	88	—	—		Don't Be Dumb
"The Mountain" (featuring Dennis Hopper, Ajay Prasanna, Anoushka Shankar, Amaan Ali Bangash and Ayaan Ali Bangash)	2026	—	—	—	—	14	—	—	—	—	—		The Mountain
"The Moon Cave" (featuring Asha Puthli, Bobby Womack, Dave Jolicoeur, Jalen Ngonda and Black Thought)	2026	72	76	—	—	9	—	—	—	24	—		The Mountain
"The Empty Dream Machine" (featuring Black Thought, Johnny Marr and Anoushka Shankar)	2026	—	—	—	—	22	—	—	—	—	—		The Mountain
"—" denotes a recording that did not chart or was not released in that territory.

== Guest appearances ==
List of non-single guest appearances, with other performing artists, showing year released and album name
Title	Year	Other performer(s)	Album
"Let's Get Dirty (I Can't Get in da Club)" (Gorillaz Remix)	2001	Redman	N/A
"Gorillaz on My Mind"	2002	Redman	Blade II: The Soundtrack
"Small Time Shot Away"	2003	Massive Attack	100th Window
"FM"	2003	Nathan Haines	Squire For Hire
"Hong Kong"	2005	N/A	Help: A Day in the Life
"Soldier Boy"	2008	Martina Topley-Bird & Roots Manuva	"Poison" single
"Sumthin Like This Night"	2011	Snoop Dogg	Doggumentary
"In My Dreams"	2018	Kali Uchis	Isolation
"Whiskey (Release Me)"	2026	A$AP Rocky & Westside Gunn	Don't Be Dumb

== Videography ==
=== Music videos ===
Title	Year	Director(s)
"Tomorrow Comes Today"	2000	Jamie Hewlett
"Clint Eastwood"	2001	Jamie Hewlett, Pete Candeland
"19-2000"	2001	Jamie Hewlett, Pete Candeland
"Rock the House"	2001	Jamie Hewlett, Pete Candeland
"19-2000 (Soulchild Remix)"	2002	Jamie Hewlett, Pete Candeland
"Lil' Dub Chefin'"	2002	Jamie Hewlett, Matt Watkins
"Rockit"	2004	Zombie Flash Eaters
"Feel Good Inc."	2005	Jamie Hewlett, Pete Candeland
"Dare"	2005	Jamie Hewlett, Pete Candeland
"Dirty Harry"	2005	Jamie Hewlett, Pete Candeland
"El Mañana"	2006	Jamie Hewlett, Pete Candeland
"Stylo"	2010	Jamie Hewlett
"Superfast Jellyfish"	2010	Jamie Hewlett
"On Melancholy Hill"	2010	Jamie Hewlett
"Doncamatic"	2010	Jamie Hewlett
"Phoner to Arizona"	2010	Jamie Hewlett
"DoYaThing"	2012	Jamie Hewlett
"Hallelujah Money"	2017	Jamie Hewlett, Giorgio Testi
"Saturnz Barz"	2017	Jamie Hewlett
"Sleeping Powder"	2017	Jamie Hewlett
"Strobelite"	2017	Raoul Skinbeck
"Humility"	2018	Jamie Hewlett, Tim McCourt, Max Taylor, Evan Silver
"Humility (Superorganism Remix)"	2018	Robert Strange
"Tranz"	2018	Jamie Hewlett, Nicos Livesey
"Momentary Bliss"	2020	Jamie Hewlett, Tim McCourt, Max Taylor
"Désolé"	2020	Jamie Hewlett, Tim McCourt, Max Taylor
"Aries"	2020	Jamie Hewlett, Tim McCourt
"Friday 13th"	2020	Jamie Hewlett, Tim McCourt, Max Taylor
"Pac-Man"	2020	Jamie Hewlett, Tim McCourt, Max Taylor
"Strange Timez"	2020	Jamie Hewlett, Tim McCourt, Max Taylor
"The Pink Phantom"	2020	Jamie Hewlett, Tim McCourt, Max Taylor
"The Valley of the Pagans"	2020	Jamie Hewlett, Tim McCourt, Max Taylor
"The Lost Chord"	2020	Jamie Hewlett, Tim McCourt, Max Taylor
"Cracker Island"	2022	Jamie Hewlett, Fx Goby
"Silent Running"	2023	Jamie Hewlett, Fx Goby
"The Mountain, The Moon Cave, and The Sad God"	2026	Jamie Hewlett, Max Taylor, Tim McCourt

=== Cancelled videos ===
Title	Year
"5/4"	2001
"Rhinestone Eyes"	2010

=== Documentaries ===
Title	Details
Bananaz	Released: 7 February 2008 (Berlin International Film Festival), 9 February 2008 (worldwide); Distributor: Parlophone, Head Film, Bananaz Productions; Director: Ceri Levy; Note: Released on DVD on 20 April 2009
Reject False Icons	Released: 16 December 2019; Distributor: Warner Music Records, Trafalgar Releasing, Eleven Films, Gorillaz Productions; Director: Denholm Hewlett; Note: Exhibited on only one night sessions at select cinemas worldwide
Song Machine Live From Kong	Released: 8 December 2021; Distributor: Warner Music Records, Trafalgar Releasing, Eleven Films, LIVENow; Note: Exhibited on only one night sessions at select cinemas worldwide

== See also ==
- Blur discography
- Damon Albarn discography
- The Good, the Bad & the Queen discography
