= NOS Primavera Sound 2022 =

Music festival in Porto, Portugal

- Dates: 9–11 June 2022
- Locations: Parque da Cidade, Porto, Portugal
- Website: www.primaverasound.com/porto

The NOS Primavera Sound 2022 was held on 9 to 11 June 2022 at the Parque da Cidade, Porto, Portugal. The festival was headlined by Tame Impala, Nick Cave and the Bad Seeds, Pavement, Beck and Gorillaz.

== Lineup ==
Headline performers are listed in boldface. Artists listed from latest to earliest set times.

NOS Stage
| Thursday, 9 June 2022 | Friday, 10 June 2022 | Saturday, 11 June 2022 |
|---|---|---|
| **Tame Impala**; **Nick Cave and the Bad Seeds**; Stella Donnelly; Pedro Mafama | **Pavement**; **Beck**; Slowdive; Beach Bunny | **Gorillaz**; Interpol; Dinosaur Jr. Helado Negro |

Headlining set lists
Tame Impala
1. "One More Year"
2. "Borderline"
3. "Nangs"
4. "Mind Mischief"
5. "Breathe Deeper"
6. "Elephant"
7. "Lost in Yesterday"
8. "Apocalypse Dreams"
9. "Let It Happen"
10. "Feels Like We Only Go Backwards"
11. "Eventually"
12. "Runway, Houses, City, Clouds"

Encore

13. "The Less I Know the Better"
14. "New Person, Same Old Mistakes"
Nick Cave & the Bad Seeds
1. "Get Ready for Love"
2. "There She Goes, My Beautiful World"
3. "From Her to Eternity"
4. "O Children"
5. "Jubilee Street"
6. "Bright Horses"
7. "I Need You"
8. "Waiting for You"
9. "Carnage"
10. "Tupelo"
11. "Red Right Hand"
12. "The Mercy Seat"
13. "The Ship Song"
14. "Higgs Boson Blues"
15. "City of Refuge"
16. "White Elephant"

Encore

17. "Into My Arms"
18. "Vortex"
19. "Ghosteen Speaks"
Pavement
1. "Grounded"
2. "Grave Architecture"
3. "Gold Soundz"
4. "Embassy Row"
5. "Trigger Cut"
6. "Shoot the Singer"
7. "In the Mouth a Desert"
8. "Stereo"
9. "Transport Is Arranged"
10. "Date w/ IKEA"
11. "Harness Your Hopes"
12. "Two States"
13. "Spit on a Stranger"
14. "Fight This Generation"
15. "Cut Your Hair"
16. "Type Slowly"
17. "Serpentine Pad"
18. "The Hexx"
19. "Range Life"
20. "Unfair"
21. "Shady Lane"
22. "Fin"
Beck
1. "Hyperlife / Movie Theme"
2. "Mixed Bizness"
3. "Devils Haircut"
4. "Dreams"
5. "Up All Night"
6. "Colors"
7. "The New Pollution"
8. "The Valley of the Pagans"
9. "Wow"
10. "Hollywood Freaks"
11. "Hell Yes"
12. "Novacane"
13. "Qué onda güero"
14. "Nicotine & Gravy"
15. "Girl"
16. "Hotwax"
17. "Dear Life"
18. "Cycle"
19. "Morning"
20. "Lost Cause"
21. "Night Running"
22. "E-Pro"
23. "Everybody's Got to Learn Sometime"
24. "One Foot in the Grave"
25. "Loser"
26. "Where It's At"
Gorillaz
1. "M1 A1"
2. "Strange Timez"
3. "Last Living Souls"
4. "Tranz"
5. "19-2000"
6. "Tomorrow Comes Today"
7. "Rhinestone Eyes"
8. "The Valley of the Pagans" with Beck
9. "Cracker Island"
10. "O Green World"
11. "Pirate Jet"
12. "On Melancholy Hill"
13. "El Mañana"
14. "Kids with Guns"
15. "Stylo" with Bootie Brown
16. "Désolé" with Fatoumata Diawara
17. "Andromeda"
18. "Garage Palace" with Little Simz
19. "Dirty Harry" with Bootie Brown
20. "Feel Good Inc." with Pos
21. "Momentary Bliss"
22. "Clint Eastwood"

Cupra Stage
| Thursday, 9 June 2022 | Friday, 10 June 2022 | Saturday, 11 June 2022 |
|---|---|---|
| Cigarettes After Sex; Jhay Cortez; DIIV; Derby Motoreta's Burrito Kachimba | Arnaldo Antunes; King Krule; Rina Sawayama; Holy Nothing | Grimes (DJ set); Little Simz; Khruangbin; Dry Cleaning |

Super Bock Stage
| Thursday, 9 June 2022 | Friday, 10 June 2022 | Saturday, 11 June 2022 |
|---|---|---|
| Mura Masa; Sky Ferreira; Spellling; Throes + The Shine | 100 gecs Amaia; María José Llergo; Montanhas Azuis | Bad Gyal; Pabllo Vittar; Paloma Mami; David Bruno |

Binance Stage
| Thursday, 9 June 2022 | Friday, 10 June 2022 | Saturday, 11 June 2022 |
|---|---|---|
| Black Coffee; Caroline Polachek; Black Midi; Kim Gordon; Penelope Isles | Chico da Tina; Jehnny Beth; Rolling Blackouts Coastal Fever; Shellac; Rita Vian | Earl Sweatshirt; Squid; Jawbox; Jamila Woods; Pile |

Bits Stage
| Thursday, 9 June 2022 | Friday, 10 June 2022 | Saturday, 11 June 2022 |
|---|---|---|
| Octo Octa B2B Eris Drew; Sherelle; Nídia; Arrogance Arrogance | Avalon Emerson; Special Request; Aurora Halal; D. Tiffany; Mvria | Mina & Bryte; Joy Orbison; Sangre Nueva (DJ Python + Kelman Duran + DJ Florentino); DJ Marcelle; DJ Firmeza |
