= How Far? =

2020 single by Gorillaz featuring Tony Allen and Skepta

Single by Gorillaz featuring Tony Allen and Skepta

from the album Song Machine, Season One: Strange Timez (Deluxe edition)
- Released: 2 May 2020
- Recorded: March 2020
- Studio: Studio 13, London, UK
- Genre: Hip hop; rock
- Length: 2:46
- Label: Parlophone; Warner
- Songwriters: Damon Albarn; Tony Allen; Remi Kabaka Jr.; Joseph Adenuga
- Producers: Gorillaz; Remi Kabaka Jr.

Gorillaz singles chronology
"Aries" (2020)	"How Far?" (2020)	"Friday 13th" (2020)

Skepta singles chronology
"Waze" (2020)	"How Far?" (2020)	"Show Out" (2020)

Tony Allen singles chronology
"Gun to the Head" (2018)	"How Far?" (2020)

Audio
- "How Far?" on YouTube

"How Far?" is a song by British virtual band Gorillaz, featuring Tony Allen and Skepta. The track was released on 2 May 2020 without any prior announcement as the fourth single for Gorillaz' seventh studio album, Song Machine, Season One: Strange Timez. The song was part of the Song Machine project, a web series which involved the release of various Gorillaz tracks featuring different guest musicians over the course of 2020, though it is not considered an official episode of the series. The single marks the first posthumously released material featuring Tony Allen (released two days after Allen's death), as well as the final song to be recorded during Allen's lifetime.

== Background ==
"How Far?" was written and recorded in the weeks prior to lockdown as a result of the COVID-19 pandemic. It was the last song from the album to be recorded in studio before lockdown was ordered.

On 30 April 2020, Tony Allen, an afrobeat drummer featured on the song, died of abdominal aortic aneurysm at the age of 79. Allen had previously worked with Gorillaz founder, Damon Albarn, through a band called The Good, the Bad & the Queen, where both participated as members of through the 2000s.

Without any prior announcement, "How Far?" released a few days later on 2 May 2020, as a standalone audio with no accompanying video or episodic EP like other Song Machine releases. According to a press release, the song was released as an official tribute to Allen.

== Track listing ==
No.	Title	Writer(s)	Producers	Length
1.	"How Far?" (featuring Tony Allen and Skepta)	Damon Albarn; Remi Kabaka Jr.; Allen; Joseph Adenuga	Gorillaz; Kabaka	2:46
Total length:				2:46

== Personnel ==
Gorillaz

- Damon Albarn – instrumentation, director, keyboards, guitar, melodica
- Jamie Hewlett – artwork, character design, video direction
- Stephen Sedgwick – mixing engineer, engineering
- Remi Kabaka Jr. – percussion
- John Davis – mastering engineer
- Samuel Egglenton – engineering

Additional musicians

- Tony Allen – vocals, drums
- Skepta – vocals
- Kotono Sato – violin
- Stella Page – viola
- Ciara Ismail – violin
- Izzi Dunn – cello

Additional artwork

- Bernard Benant – photography
