= The Pink Phantom =

2020 single by Gorillaz featuring Elton John and 6lack

Single by Gorillaz featuring Elton John and 6lack

from the album Song Machine, Season One: Strange Timez and The Lockdown Sessions
- Released: 1 October 2020
- Recorded: 2020
- Studio: Studio 13 (London, UK); The Barn (Devon, UK); LVRN (Atlanta, Georgia, US); Rocket Entertainment (London, UK)
- Genre: Psychedelic pop; R&B; chillwave; pop rock; glam rock
- Length: 4:13
- Label: Parlophone; Warner
- Songwriters: Damon Albarn; Remi Kabaka Jr.; Ricardo Valentine Jr.
- Producers: Gorillaz; Remi Kabaka Jr.

Gorillaz singles chronology
"Strange Timez" (2020)	"The Pink Phantom" (2020)	"The Valley of the Pagans" (2020)

Elton John singles chronology
"Learn to Fly" (2020)	"The Pink Phantom" (2020)	"Chosen Family" (2021)

6lack singles chronology
"Touch & Go (Remix)" (2020)	"The Pink Phantom" (2020)	"Stay Down" (2020)

Music video
- "The Pink Phantom" on YouTube

"The Pink Phantom" is a song by British virtual band Gorillaz, featuring British singer Elton John and American singer 6lack. The track was released on 1 October 2020 as the eighth single for Gorillaz' seventh studio album, Song Machine, Season One: Strange Timez, and the seventh episode of the Song Machine project, a web series which involved the release of various Gorillaz tracks featuring different guest musicians over the course of 2020. The song was later included on John's 2021 album The Lockdown Sessions.

== Background ==
The song was recorded in 2020 during the COVID-19 pandemic, with Elton John recording from London, and Gorillaz singer Damon Albarn recording from Devon. The song was originally planned to be made solely with Elton John in Atlanta, where Albarn was meeting with 6lack and EarthGang. After the pandemic prevented these sessions, however, 6lack was added to the track.

== Music video ==
The video, directed by Jamie Hewlett, Tim McCourt, and Max Taylor, features 2-D, Elton John, and 6lack performing a lavishly pink and emotional song inside Kong Studios during a thunderstorm. Prior to the video, the group used the portals seen in "Désolé" to evade the COVID-19 travel restrictions; the journey inadvertently warped Elton John and 6lack's appearances, turning the former into an animated character and the latter into a semi-holographic state. However, the two decide to continue with the shoot regardless. Meanwhile, Murdoc tries to catch the Pink Phantom with a butterfly net. After the song ends, Murdoc, dressed as a matador and strumming a guitar, attempts to join the others, but realises he missed the entire number.

The video is based on the opening credits of the 1975 comedy film, The Return of the Pink Panther. Elton John was presented in animated form in this music video as per his personal request to Jamie Hewlett.

== Track listing ==
No.	Title	Writer(s)	Producers	Length
1.	"Machine Bitez #14" (with 2-D, Murdoc, Russel and Noodle)			0:46
2.	"The Pink Phantom" (featuring Elton John and 6lack)	Damon Albarn; Remi Kabaka Jr.; Ricardo Valentine Jr.	Gorillaz; Kabaka	4:13
3.	"Machine Bitez #15" (with 2-D, Murdoc, Russel and Noodle)			0:45
4.	"Machine Bitez #16" (with 2-D, Murdoc, Russel and Noodle)			0:37
Total length:				6:21

== Personnel ==
Gorillaz

- Damon Albarn – vocals, instrumentation, director, bass, keyboards, piano
- Jamie Hewlett – artwork, character design, video direction
- Remi Kabaka Jr. – drum programming

Additional musicians and personnel

- Elton John – vocals, piano
- 6lack – vocals, engineering
- Stephen Sedgwick – mixing engineer, engineering
- Samuel Egglenton – engineering
- John Davis – mastering engineer
- Matt Doughty – engineering
