= The Lockdown Sessions (Elton John album) =

2021 collaborative album by Elton John

Studio album by Elton John and various artists
- Released: 22 October 2021
- Recorded: 2020–2021
- Genre: Pop
- Length: 65:32
- Labels: EMI; Interscope
- Producers: Pnau; Andrew Watt; Louis Bell; Surfaces; Charlie Puth; Danny L. Harle; Damon Albarn; Remi Kabaka Jr; Stuart Price; Pet Shop Boys; SG Lewis; Taylor Bird; Bruce Roberts; John Cunningham; Jasper Sheff; Julian Raymond; Steve Mac; Cirkut

Elton John chronology
Regimental Sgt. Zippo (2021)	The Lockdown Sessions (2021)	Who Believes in Angels? (2025)

Singles from The Lockdown Sessions
- 1. "Cold Heart (Pnau remix)" Released: 13 August 2021; 2. "After All" Released: 22 September 2021; 3. "Finish Line" Released: 30 September 2021

The Lockdown Sessions is the fourth collaborative studio album by British musician Elton John, released through EMI in the United Kingdom and Interscope Records in the United States on 22 October 2021. It was recorded during the COVID-19 pandemic, after John was forced to pause his Farewell Yellow Brick Road tour due to lockdown, hence the album's title. The album includes three singles: "Cold Heart (Pnau remix)" with Dua Lipa, "After All" with Charlie Puth, and "Finish Line" with Stevie Wonder. A 2022 reissue of the album includes "Merry Christmas" with Ed Sheeran and "Hold Me Closer" with Britney Spears.

The Lockdown Sessions was a critical and commercial success, being praised for its performances and diversity. "Cold Heart (Pnau remix)" topped the UK singles chart while "Hold Me Closer" reached number three; both singles also reached the top 10 in the US.

== Background ==
The album features several previously released tracks: "Learn to Fly", released in June 2020; "Chosen Family", John's duet with Rina Sawayama on her Sawayama album; Gorillaz' track "The Pink Phantom" from their 2020 album Song Machine, Season One: Strange Timez, on which John appears as a guest alongside 6lack; John's cover of the Pet Shop Boys' "It's a Sin" along with Years & Years, released in May 2021; Miley Cyrus' version of "Nothing Else Matters" featuring John alongside various other guests (including Andrew Watt, Yo-Yo Ma, Robert Trujillo and Chad Smith), released in June 2021 from the Metallica tribute album The Metallica Blacklist; and John's collaboration with Lil Nas X "One of Me", from Lil Nas X's debut studio album Montero.

Besides these, the record also features collaborations with other artists including Pearl Jam frontman Eddie Vedder, Brandi Carlile, Charlie Puth, Stevie Wonder, Nicki Minaj, Young Thug, Stevie Nicks, and Glen Campbell.

John explained the project in a statement: "Some of the recording sessions had to be done remotely, via Zoom, which I'd obviously never done before. Some of the sessions were recorded under very stringent safety regulations: working with another artist, but separated by glass screens. But all the tracks I worked on were really interesting and diverse, stuff that was completely different to anything I'm known for, stuff that took me out of my comfort zone into completely new territory. And I realised there was something weirdly familiar about working like this. At the start of my career, in the late 60s, I worked as a session musician. Working with different artists during lockdown reminded me of that. I'd come full circle: I was a session musician again. And it was still a blast."

When talking about his collaboration with Surfaces on the song "Learn to Fly", John tweeted: "When the guys first sent me the song, I just loved it. It was an honour to lend my vocals and some piano." In a statement, Surfaces said: "After a series of Zoom studio sessions, we were able to record together from quarantine. Working with Elton felt like the idea of winning a Grammy. He was so passionate and driven and we couldn't have wished for a more effortless collaboration." A music video to accompany the release of "Learn to Fly" was released onto YouTube on 24 June 2020. It was made in collaboration with director and illustrator Ivan Dixon, who also provided the visuals for Surfaces' song "Bloom", and was produced by Sean Zwan from Studio Showoff.

When the album hit number-one in the UK Albums Chart on 29 October 2021, John said "I am so proud of what we have created" and wrote on his social media accounts:

"This album is all about the capacity for music to bring people together to form new friendships and connections and right now I couldn't feel more connected to my amazing fans in the UK who made this happen.

When I started collaborating with some of my favourite artists at the start of the pandemic, I couldn't have dreamt in my wildest dreams it would lead to a number one album. I am so proud of what we have created and thrilled that it has connected with our fans to such a degree. It shows the spirit of collaboration and togetherness that can still happen in the most trying circumstances.

Thank you to everyone who helped bring this album to life—I love you all. ❤"

— Elton John

== Singles ==
The lead single, "Cold Heart (Pnau remix)" with Dua Lipa, combines elements of John's 1989 song "Sacrifice", his 1972 single "Rocket Man", his 1976 album track "Where's the Shoorah?" from Blue Moves and his 1983 single "Kiss the Bride", and was released on 13 August 2021. On 15 October 2021, the single peaked at number one on the UK singles chart. This was John's first UK number one in 16 years, since 2005's posthumous Tupac Shakur collaboration "Ghetto Gospel".

The album's official second single, "After All", is a collaboration with American singer Charlie Puth. It was released on 22 September 2021.

The album's official third single, "Finish Line", is a collaboration with American singer Stevie Wonder. It was released on 30 September 2021. "Finish Line" failed to chart on the Official UK Top 100, but debuted at number 73 on the Official UK Singles Sales Chart Top 100 on 28 January 2022

== Critical reception ==
Professional ratings
Aggregate scores
Source	Rating
AnyDecentMusic?	6.8/10
Metacritic	70/100
Review scores
Source	Rating
AllMusic	3/5 stars
The Independent	3/5 stars
Mojo	4/5 stars
MusicOMH	3.5/5 stars
NME	4/5 stars
The Observer	3/5 stars
PopMatters	8/10
Rolling Stone	3/5 stars
Uncut	6/10

The Lockdown Sessions received generally positive reviews from music critics. According to the review aggregator Metacritic, The Lockdown Sessions received "generally favorable reviews" based on a weighted average score of 70 out of 100 from 10 critic scores. Aggregator AnyDecentMusic? gave it 6.8 out of 10, based on their assessment of the critical consensus.

Stephen Thomas Erlewine of AllMusic said, "The record is at its best when it's close to an old-fashioned duet album." Helen Brown of The Independent said, "There are a couple of stunning vocal performances. Rina Sawayama sings like a galleon in full sail on the big, bold ballad "Chosen Family". ... Grim moments include Young Thug's sleazy sex rap on "I Will Always Love You." ... In the middle ground are a few hummable collaborations ("Learn to Fly" with Surfaces, "Finish Line" with Stevie Wonder)." John Aizlewood of Mojo said, "Probably his most varied album. ... The extremes work better still, be it Cyrus's eyebrow-raising raw trawl through Metallica's Nothing Else Matters or the vocal pyrotechnics which course through Young Thug & Nicki Minaj's Always Love You." John Murphy of MusicOMH called the album "an album that could have easily come off as a millionaire's vanity project with his rich mates is actually a surprising, creatively rich endeavour." Gary Ryan of NME said, "All in all, The Lockdown Sessions all-bets-off stylistic game of spin-the-bottle feels attuned to 2021's post-genre Spotify world, as Elton continues to further his musical universe. The Rocketman remains in orbit." Kate Hutchinson of The Observer said, "It's all fun, though a little disjointed – and the less said about Elton's trap song, Always Love You, with Nicki Minaj and Young Thug, the better." Rich Wilhelm of PopMatters said, "The Lockdown Sessions is an engaging series of snapshots of time well-spent." Jon Dolan of Rolling Stone said, "Even if this project probably won't give us any fresh entrants into the large canon of classic Elton songs, The Lockdown Sessions is still a glowing testament to his enduring pop gravitas." Stephen Troussé of Uncut called the album "a rum selection of Zoom collaborations with everyone from Dua Lipa to Lil Nas X, that old keenness is still there, though only on "It's a Sin," his Brits team-up with Olly Alexander." Annie Zaleski of Variety said, "John's open-hearted vocals and sincerity make The Lockdown Sessions a charming listen."

== Commercial performance ==
The album was released on 22 October 2021, and in the OCC's UK midweek chart update on 25 October, the album was described as being in a "four way battle" with Duran Duran's Future Past, Lana Del Rey's Blue Banisters and Biffy Clyro's The Myth of the Happily Ever After for the number-one position. It later became John's eighth number-one album in the UK on 29 October 2021, his first number-one album since 2012's Good Morning to the Night.

The Lockdown Sessions achieved 31,000 chart sales in the UK, 84% of which were physical (CD and vinyl) sales in the first week. It was John's second number one in the UK in less than a month – "Cold Heart (Pnau remix)" with Dua Lipa reached number one on the UK Singles Chart earlier in the month. In the United States, the album debuted at number ten on the Billboard 200 with first-week sales of 29,000 album-equivalent units, 17,000 of that sum were pure album copies, it went straight to number four on the U.S. Top Album Sales chart.

== Track listing ==
The Lockdown Sessions track listing
No.	Title	Writer(s)	Producer(s)	Length
1.	"Cold Heart (Pnau remix)" (with Dua Lipa)	Elton John; Bernie Taupin; Peter Mayes; Nicholas Littlemore; Sam Littlemore	Pnau	3:39
2.	"Always Love You" (with Young Thug and Nicki Minaj)	John; Andrew Wotman; Ali Tamposi; Louis Bell; Jeffery Lamar Williams; Billy Walsh; Onika Maraj	Andrew Watt; Bell	4:17
3.	"Learn to Fly" (Surfaces featuring Elton John)	Forrest Frank; Colin Padalecki	Frank; Padalecki	3:31
4.	"After All" (with Charlie Puth)	John; Puth; Jacob Kasher Hindlin	Puth	3:28
5.	"Chosen Family" (with Rina Sawayama)	Sawayama; Jonny Lattimer; Danny L Harle	Harle	4:40
6.	"The Pink Phantom" (Gorillaz featuring Elton John and 6lack)	Damon Albarn; Remi Kabaka Jr.; Ricardo Valdez Valentine Jr.	Gorillaz; Kabaka Jr.	4:13
7.	"It's a Sin" (with Years & Years)	Neil Tennant; Chris Lowe	Stuart Price; Pet Shop Boys	4:44
8.	"Nothing Else Matters" (Miley Cyrus featuring Watt, Elton John, Yo-Yo Ma, Robert Trujillo and Chad Smith)	James Hetfield; Lars Ulrich	Watt	6:35
9.	"Orbit" (with SG Lewis)	John; Samuel George Lewis; Sophie Frances Cooke	SG Lewis	3:28
10.	"Simple Things" (with Brandi Carlile)	John; Wotman; Roman Campolo	Watt	4:11
11.	"Beauty in the Bones" (with Jimmie Allen)	Allen; Taylor Bird; Phil Bentley; Bruce Roberts	Bird; Roberts	3:50
12.	"One of Me" (Lil Nas X featuring Elton John)	Montero Hill; John Cunningham; Jasper Sheff; Ilsey Juber	Cunningham; Sheff	2:41
13.	"E-Ticket" (with Eddie Vedder)	John; Vedder; Wotman	Watt	3:18
14.	"Finish Line" (with Stevie Wonder)	John; Wotman; Tamposi; Campolo	Watt	4:24
15.	"Stolen Car" (with Stevie Nicks)	John; Wotman; Tamposi	Watt	5:37
16.	"I'm Not Gonna Miss You" (with Glen Campbell)	Campbell; Julian Raymond	Raymond	2:56
Total length:				65:32

Japanese version bonus track
No.	Title	Writer(s)	Producer(s)	Length
17.	"Cold Heart" (PS1 remix, with Dua Lipa)	John; Taupin; Mayes; N. Littlemore; S. Littlemore	Mayes; N. Littlemore; S. Littlemore	2:47
Total length:				68:19

Christmas edition track listing
No.	Title	Writer(s)	Producer(s)	Length
1.	"Merry Christmas" (with Ed Sheeran)	John; Sheeran; Steve Mac	Mac	3:28

Deluxe Christmas edition bonus tracks
No.	Title	Writer(s)	Producer(s)	Length
1.	"Hold Me Closer" (with Britney Spears)	John; Taupin; Watt; Wotman; Henry Walter	Watt; Cirkut	3:22
18.	"Merry Christmas" (with Ed Sheeran)	John; Sheeran; Steve Mac	Mac	3:28
Total length:				72:22

== Charts ==
=== Weekly charts ===
Weekly chart performance for The Lockdown Sessions
Chart (2021)	Peak position
Australian Albums (ARIA)	2
Austrian Albums (Ö3 Austria)	6
Belgian Albums (Ultratop Flanders)	22
Belgian Albums (Ultratop Wallonia)	3
Canadian Albums (Billboard)	5
Czech Albums (ČNS IFPI)	35
Danish Albums (Hitlisten)	26
Dutch Albums (Album Top 100)	19
French Albums (SNEP)	8
German Albums (Offizielle Top 100)	5
Irish Albums (Official Charts)	9
Italian Albums (FIMI)	15
Japan Hot Albums (Billboard Japan)	58
Japanese Albums (Oricon)	57
Lithuanian Albums (AGATA)	30
New Zealand Albums (RMNZ)	4
Norwegian Albums (VG-lista)	14
Polish Albums (ZPAV)	19
Portuguese Albums (AFP)	30
Scottish Albums (Official Charts)	2
Spanish Albums (Promusicae)	25
Swedish Albums (Sverigetopplistan)	41
Swiss Albums (Schweizer Hitparade)	4
UK Albums (Official Charts)	1
US Billboard 200	10

=== Year-end charts ===
2021 year-end chart performance for The Lockdown Sessions
Chart (2021)	Position
Belgian Albums (Ultratop Wallonia)	191
Swiss Albums (Schweizer Hitparade)	68
UK Albums (OCC)	39

2022 year-end chart performance for The Lockdown Sessions
Chart (2022)	Position
Canadian Albums (Billboard)	29
French Albums (SNEP)	169
US Billboard 200	185

== Certifications ==
Certifications for The Lockdown Sessions
Region	Certification	Certified units/sales
Italy (FIMI)	Gold	25,000^{‡}
New Zealand (RMNZ)	Platinum	15,000^{‡}
Poland (ZPAV)	2× Platinum	40,000^{‡}
Switzerland (IFPI Switzerland)	Gold	10,000^{‡}
United Kingdom (BPI)	Gold	100,000^{‡}
^{‡} Sales+streaming figures based on certification alone.

== Release history ==
Release dates and formats for The Lockdown Sessions
Region	Date	Format	Label	Ref.
Various	22 October 2021	Cassette; CD; digital download; streaming; Vinyl	EMI; Interscope	
Japan	22 October 2021	CD	Universal Music Japan	
Brazil	3 December 2021	CD	Universal Music Brasil	
