= Friday 13th (song) =

2020 single by Gorillaz featuring Octavian

Single by Gorillaz featuring Octavian

from the album Song Machine, Season One: Strange Timez
- Released: 9 June 2020
- Studio: Studio 13 (London, UK)
- Genre: Neo R&B; trip hop; downtempo
- Length: 3:35
- Label: Parlophone; Warner
- Songwriters: Damon Albarn; Octavian Godji; Remi Kabaka Jr.
- Producers: Gorillaz; Remi Kabaka Jr.

Gorillaz singles chronology
"How Far?" (2020)	"Friday 13th" (2020)	"Pac-Man" (2020)

Octavian singles chronology
"Poison" (2020)	"Friday 13th" (2020)	"Rari" (2020)

Music video
- "Friday 13th" on YouTube

"Friday 13th" is a song by British virtual band Gorillaz featuring French-British rapper Octavian. The track was released on 9 June 2020 as the fifth single for Gorillaz' seventh studio album, Song Machine, Season One: Strange Timez, and the fourth episode of the Song Machine project, a web series which involved the release of various Gorillaz tracks featuring different guest musicians over the course of 2020.

== Music video ==
The video, directed by Jamie Hewlett, Tim McCourt, and Max Taylor, was recorded while Gorillaz' virtual members were in quarantine due to the COVID-19 pandemic and features their likenesses, which are noticeably scarred and bruised which Jamie Hewlett stated was the result of their fight in the music video for "Aries", as well as footage of Octavian performing the track set against footage of moving roads and tunnels. The video ends with a quote from playwright James Baldwin.

== Track listing ==
No.	Title	Writer(s)	Producers	Length
1.	"Machine Bitez #8" (with 2-D, Murdoc and Russel)			0:49
2.	"Friday 13th" (featuring Octavian)	Damon Albarn; Remi Kabaka Jr.; Octavian Godji	Gorillaz; Kabaka	3:35
Total length:				4:24

== Personnel ==
Gorillaz

- Damon Albarn – vocals, instrumentation, director, bass, keyboards, guitar
- Jamie Hewlett – artwork, character design, video direction
- Remi Kabaka Jr. – drum programming

Additional musicians and personnel

- Octavian – vocals
- John Davis – mastering engineer
- Samuel Egglenton – engineering
- Stephen Sedgwick – mixing engineer, engineering

== Charts ==
Weekly chart performance for "Friday 13th"
Chart (2020)	Peak position
US Hot Rock & Alternative Songs (Billboard)	49
