= Meanwhile EP =

2021 EP by Gorillaz

EP by Gorillaz
- Released: 26 August 2021
- Genre: Reggae
- Length: 9:53
- Labels: Parlophone; Warner
- Producers: Gorillaz; Remi Kabaka Jr.

Gorillaz chronology
Song Machine, Season One: Strange Timez (2020)	Meanwhile EP (2021)	Cracker Island (2023)

Damon Albarn chronology
Song Machine, Season One: Strange Timez (2020)	Meanwhile EP (2021)	The Nearer the Fountain, More Pure the Stream Flows (2021)

Professional ratings
Review scores
Source	Rating
Clash	8/10
NME	4/5 stars

Meanwhile EP is an extended play by English virtual band Gorillaz, released on 26 August 2021. The EP was released as a celebration of Notting Hill Carnival in London, England, an annual event that was cancelled in 2021 due to the COVID-19 pandemic.

The cover art is the south facing side of Trellick Tower.

== Background ==
On 29 June 2021, Damon Albarn revealed in an interview with NME that Gorillaz was working on new "carnival-themed music", saying that their upcoming record would return to the band's roots.

On 10 August 2021, Gorillaz debuted three new songs, "Meanwhile" (featuring British rapper Jelani Blackman), "Jimmy Jimmy" (featuring British rapper AJ Tracey), and "Déjà Vu" (featuring Jamaican singer Alicaì Harley), during a free concert at The O_{2} Arena in London, England exclusively for National Health Service employees and their families. They then performed them again at the subsequent concert open to the public the next day (both of which served as the first live audience concerts of the Song Machine Tour).

== Track listing ==
All tracks are written by Damon Albarn, Remi Kabaka Jr., and the tracks' respective guest(s).

Meanwhile – Standard edition
No.	Title	Length
1.	"Meanwhile" (featuring Jelani Blackman and Barrington Levy)	3:09
2.	"Jimmy Jimmy" (featuring AJ Tracey)	3:03
3.	"Déjà Vu" (featuring Alicaì Harley) (Live from NW10)	3:41
Total length:		9:53

== Personnel ==
Gorillaz

- Damon Albarn – vocals, production (all tracks), bass, keyboards (tracks 1–2), steelpans (track 1), guitar, melodica (track 2)
- Jamie Hewlett – artwork, design
- Stephen Sedgwick – mixing (tracks 1–2)
- Remi Kabaka Jr. – production, percussion (all tracks), drum programming (tracks 1–2)
- John Davis – mastering
- Samuel Egglenton – engineering (tracks 1–2)
- Femi Koleoso – drums (tracks 1, 3)
- Mike Smith – keyboards (track 3)
- Jeff Wootton – guitar (track 3)
- Jesse Hackett – keyboards (track 3)
- Karl Vanden Bossche – percussion (track 3)
- Seye Adelekan – bass (track 3)

Additional musicians

- Jelani Blackman – vocals (track 1)
- Barrington Levy – vocals (track 1)
- Jorja Smith – additional vocals (track 1)
- Isabelle Dunn – cello (track 1)
- Nina Foster – violin (track 1)
- Oli Langford – violin (track 1)
- Sarah Tuke – violin (track 1)
- AJ Tracey – vocals (track 2)
- Alicaì Harley – vocals (track 3)
- Ade Omotayo – additional vocals (track 3)
- Angel Silvera – additional vocals (track 3)
- Matt Maijah – additional vocals (track 3)
- Michelle Ndegwa – additional vocals (track 3)
- Petra Luke – additional vocals (track 3)
- Rebecca Freckleton – additional vocals (track 3)

Additional technical

- Alicaì Harley – programming (track 3)
- Dave Guerin – engineering (track 3)
- Matt Butcher – engineering, mixing (track 3)

== Charts ==
Chart (2021)	Peak position
UK Singles Downloads (Official Charts)	76
