= Pac-Man (song) =

2020 single by Gorillaz featuring Schoolboy Q

Single by Gorillaz featuring Schoolboy Q

from the album Song Machine, Season One: Strange Timez
- Released: 20 July 2020
- Recorded: January 2020
- Studio: Studio 13 (London, UK); Paul's Coffee Shop (Long Island, New York, US); Fire Garden (Philadelphia, Pennsylvania, US)
- Genre: Funk; hip hop; G-funk; downtempo
- Length: 3:12
- Label: Parlophone; Warner
- Songwriters: Jon Smythe; Paul Huston; Remi Kabaka Jr.; Damon Albarn; Quincy Hanley; Elvin Shahbazian; Joel McNeill; John McNeill
- Producers: Gorillaz; Remi Kabaka Jr.; Paul Huston

Gorillaz singles chronology
"Friday 13th" (2020)	"Pac-Man" (2020)	"Strange Timez" (2020)

Schoolboy Q singles chronology
"Chase the Money" (2019)	"Pac-Man" (2020)	"Gang Signs" (2021)

Music video
- "PAC-MAN" on YouTube

"Pac-Man" (stylised as "PAC-MAN") is a song by British virtual band Gorillaz featuring American rapper Schoolboy Q. The track was released on 20 July 2020 as the sixth single for Gorillaz' seventh studio album, Song Machine, Season One: Strange Timez, and the fifth episode of the Song Machine project, a web series which involved the release of various Gorillaz tracks featuring different guest musicians over the course of 2020.

== Background ==
The song was recorded in London, prior to the COVID-19 pandemic. It was released to commemorate the 40th anniversary of the arcade game, Pac-Man.

== Music video ==
The video, directed by Jamie Hewlett, Tim McCourt, and Max Taylor, features the band members inside Kong Studios, the band's fictional headquarters. 2-D is in the game room playing the Pac-Man arcade game, Russel is boxing with a punching bag, Murdoc is in the basement, sitting inside an orgone accumulator, and Noodle is on the recording studio couch with her mobile phone while Schoolboy Q records his verse. As 2-D continues to play for nine hours, all of his bandmates feel the effects of the arcade game, such as Murdoc looking outside his accumulator, Russel pausing from punching as though he heard something, and Noodle changing art styles, switching to an anime style and then a Peanuts-like character. At the end of the video, Noodle goes down to the game room and unplugs the Pac-Man arcade game, leaving 2-D confused.

The video incorporates many references to the arcade game, including:

- The arcade cabinet artwork is sightly redrawn with 2-D as the ghost and Murdoc as Pac-Man.
- Murdoc is wearing Pac-Man underwear.
- The arcade game portrays the band members as 8-bit characters, with 2-D as Pac-Man and Inky, Blinky, Pinky and Clyde replaced with the faces of Murdoc, Russel, and Noodle.

== Track listing ==
No.	Title	Writer(s)	Producers	Length
1.	"Machine Bitez #9" (with 2-D, Murdoc and Russel)			0:44
2.	"Pac-Man" (featuring Schoolboy Q)	Damon Albarn; Remi Kabaka Jr.; Quincy Hanley; Elvin Shahbazian; Jon Smythe; Paul Huston; Joel McNeill; John McNeill	Gorillaz; Huston; Kabaka	3:12
3.	"Machine Bitez #10" (with 2-D, Murdoc and Russel)			0:44
4.	"Machine Bitez #11" (with 2-D and Schoolboy Q)			1:38
Total length:				6:18

== Personnel ==
Gorillaz

- Damon Albarn – vocals, backing vocals, instrumentation, director, keyboards, bass, guitar, synthesizer, drums, percussion
- Jamie Hewlett – artwork, character design, video direction
- Remi Kabaka Jr. – percussion, drums

Additional musicians and personnel

- Schoolboy Q – vocals
- Prince Paul – backing vocals, engineering
- John Smythe – guitar
- Weathrman – bass, keyboards, synthesizer
- Stephen Sedgwick – mixing engineer, engineering
- Samuel Egglenton – engineering
- John Davis – mastering engineer
- Elvin "Wit" Shahbazian – engineering

== Charts ==
Chart (2020)	Peak position
New Zealand Hot Singles (RMNZ)	30
US Hot Rock & Alternative Songs (Billboard)	33
