= Aries (song) =

2020 single by Gorillaz featuring Peter Hook and Georgia

Single by Gorillaz featuring Peter Hook and Georgia

from the album Song Machine, Season One: Strange Timez
- Released: 9 April 2020
- Recorded: 2019
- Studio: Studio 13, London
- Genre: Alternative rock; post-punk; synth-pop; new wave
- Length: 4:13
- Label: Parlophone; Warner
- Songwriters: Damon Albarn; Peter Hook; Remi Kabaka Jr.; Richard Isong
- Producers: Gorillaz; James Ford; Remi Kabaka Jr.; P2J

Gorillaz singles chronology
"Désolé" (2020)	"Aries" (2020)	"How Far?" (2020)

Peter Hook singles chronology
"Aries" (2020)

Georgia singles chronology
"24 Hours" (2020)	"Aries" (2020)	"Get Me Higher" (2021)

Music video
- "Aries" on YouTube

"Aries" is a song by British virtual band Gorillaz featuring drummer Georgia and bassist Peter Hook of the bands Joy Division and New Order. The track was released on 9 April 2020 as the third single for Gorillaz' seventh studio album, Song Machine, Season One: Strange Timez. It was part of the Song Machine project, a web series which involved the release of various Gorillaz tracks featuring different guest musicians over the course of 2020.

Louder Than War observed, "'Aries' comes in all funked up... Hooky's in there with that familiar low slung bass sound accompanied by the onslaught of old style drum machines, a trip back into 80's territory here from the school of OMD, Depeche Mode and of course New Order."

== Music video ==
The video, directed by Jamie Hewlett and Tim McCourt, features the band members driving vehicles across a highway landscape in Morocco. 2-D and Murdoc are riding together on a motorcycle, followed by Noodle in a dune buggy (where just prior she is texting someone about 2-D's whereabouts and has grown concerned for him) and finally Russel in a golf kart. Near the end of the video all four of them ride up close to one another. As 2-D continues to sing, Murdoc pulls out a syringe and smiles in a sinister fashion.

On 4 September 2020, Gorillaz released an online driving game based on the "Aries" music video on their website.

== Tracklist ==
No.	Title	Writer(s)	Producers	Length
1.	"Machine Bitez #6" (with 2-D, Murdoc and Russel)			0:54
2.	"Aries" (featuring Peter Hook and Georgia)	Damon Albarn; Remi Kabaka Jr.; Hook; Richard Isong	Gorillaz; James Ford; Kabaka; P2J	4:13
3.	"Machine Bitez #7" (with 2-D, Noodle, Murdoc and Russel)			0:35
Total length:				5:42

== Personnel ==
Gorillaz

- Damon Albarn – vocals, instrumentation, director, guitar, synthesizer
- Jamie Hewlett – artwork, character design, video direction
- Remi Kabaka Jr. – drum programming, percussion, drums

Additional musicians and personnel

- Peter Hook – bass
- Georgia – drums, percussion
- John Davis – mastering engineer
- P2J – drum programming
- James Ford – synthesizers, live drums, percussion, drum programming
- Stephen Sedgwick – mixing engineer, engineering
- Samuel Egglenton – engineering

== Charts ==
Chart (2020)	Peak position
Belgium (Ultratip Bubbling Under Flanders)	42
Mexico Ingles Airplay (Billboard)	12
New Zealand Hot Singles (RMNZ)	29
US Hot Rock & Alternative Songs (Billboard)	13
