= Sleeping Powder =

2017 single by Gorillaz

Single by Gorillaz
- Released: 8 June 2017
- Genre: Alternative rock; psychedelic disco
- Length: 2:46
- Label: Parlophone
- Songwriter: Damon Albarn
- Producer: Gorillaz

Gorillaz singles chronology
"The Apprentice" (2017)	"Sleeping Powder" (2017)	"Strobelite" (2017)

Music video
- "Sleeping Powder" on YouTube

"Sleeping Powder" is a song by British virtual band Gorillaz. The song and its accompanying music video were released on 8 June 2017 via YouTube, with a live debut occurring that same day. It was later released for streaming via Spotify and iTunes on 16 June 2017.

== Production ==
"Sleeping Powder" was the first song to be recorded and released after the release of Humanz. Through deliberate design (and in contrast to Humanz), it doesn't feature any musical collaborators. Damon Albarn, speaking through the perspective of fictional band member 2-D, explained this decision: "2-D felt maybe he was unrepresented on Humanz. It wasn't a problem, but maybe he was a bit too generous, you know? So he thought he'd do a song just by himself, and make a video just with him, and not tell anyone else."

"Sleeping Powder" was written only three days before its June 8 debut, and its video was completed a day prior to release. To facilitate such a speedy turnaround for a music video, motion capture (provided by Albarn) was used for 2-D's animation. Backgrounds were largely composed of assorted stock footage.

== Music video ==
The music video opens with a clip from the 1987 anti-drug PSA, This Is Your Brain on Drugs.

2-D sits at a grand piano, playing along with the song's opening. As the song progresses, the room begins to warp, with the walls and furniture floating away to reveal a blue void. With every scene transition, the background shifts through several clips of stock footage while 2-D dances to the music. The music video ends as it started, with the room reconstructing itself as 2-D plays the piano once more.

== Track listing ==
Digital release single

1. "Sleeping Powder" – 2:46

== Personnel ==
- Damon Albarn – vocals, synthesizer, bass guitar, drums
- Remi Kabaka Jr. – drum programming
- John Davis – mastering engineer
- Stephen Sedgwick – mixing engineer

== Charts ==
Chart (2017)	Peak position
Mexico Ingles Airplay (Billboard)	47
US Hot Rock & Alternative Songs (Billboard)	22
