= The Valley of the Pagans =

2020 single by Gorillaz featuring Beck

Single by Gorillaz featuring Beck

from the album Song Machine, Season One: Strange Timez
- Released: 5 November 2020
- Recorded: 2020
- Studio: Studio 13 (London, UK); The Barn (Devon, UK)
- Genre: Alternative rock; electronic; funk rock; synthwave; disco; dark wave
- Length: 3:01
- Label: Parlophone; Warner
- Songwriters: Damon Albarn; Remi Kabaka Jr.; Beck Hansen
- Producers: Gorillaz; Remi Kabaka Jr.

Gorillaz singles chronology
"The Pink Phantom" (2020)	"The Valley of the Pagans" (2020)	"Cracker Island" (2022)

Beck singles chronology
"No Distraction (Khruangbin Remix)" (2020)	"The Valley of the Pagans" (2020)	"Find My Way" (2021)

Music videos
- "The Valley of the Pagans" (Original Version; Reupload) on YouTube
- "The Valley of the Pagans" (Alternate Version) on YouTube

"The Valley of the Pagans" is a song by British virtual band Gorillaz featuring Beck. The track was released on 5 November 2020 as the ninth and final single for Gorillaz' seventh studio album, Song Machine, Season One: Strange Timez, and the eighth episode of the Song Machine project, a web series which involved the release of various Gorillaz tracks featuring different guest musicians over the course of 2020.

== Background ==
The demo version of the song, titled "West Hollywood", was leaked on 2 August 2020. It was recorded at Damon Albarn's home studio in Devon, England in 2020 during the COVID-19 pandemic.

== Music video ==
The video, directed by Jamie Hewlett, Tim McCourt, and Max Taylor, opens up in the Kong Studios garage where Noodle is driving a similar car from the "Stylo" music video, but a portal opens up behind them and Noodle backs up into it. The portal transports the band into Grand Theft Auto V where Noodle speeds down various streets in the game. Beck appears in a smartphone seen on the bottom right of the screen and 2-D is shown talking to him in the back seat of the car. The video ends with the band driving through another portal that sends the car crashing into the ocean at Point Nemo, where Plastic Beach remains.

The music video on the band's YouTube page was taken down five days after it premiered. An alternative version of the video without the Grand Theft Auto V footage was uploaded in its place on 9 March 2021 instead pitting them into the roads seen in the 19-2000 music video.

== Track listing ==
No.	Title	Writer(s)	Producers	Length
1.	"The Valley of the Pagans" (featuring Beck)	Damon Albarn; Remi Kabaka Jr.; Beck Hansen	Gorillaz; Kabaka	3:01
2.	"Machine Bitez #17" (with 2-D, Murdoc, Russel and Noodle)			0:36
3.	"Machine Bitez #18" (with 2-D, Murdoc, Russel and Noodle)			0:36
Total length:				4:13

== Personnel ==
Gorillaz

- Damon Albarn – vocals, instrumentation, director, keyboards, bass, guitar, drum programming
- Jamie Hewlett – artwork, character design, video direction
- Remi Kabaka Jr. – drum programming

Additional musicians and personnel

- Beck – vocals
- Rudy Albarn – drums, percussion
- David Greenbaum – engineering
- Dylan Herman – engineering
- Stephen Sedgwick – mixing engineer, engineering
- Samuel Egglenton – engineering
- John Davis – mastering engineer

== Charts ==
Weekly chart performance for "The Valley of the Pagans"
Chart (2020)	Peak position
US Hot Rock & Alternative Songs (Billboard)	45
US Rock & Alternative Airplay (Billboard)	42
