= Humility (song) =

- Remixes cover art

Single by Gorillaz featuring George Benson

from the album The Now Now
- Released: 31 May 2018
- Genre: Indie rock; funk; pop; jazz pop; yacht rock
- Length: 3:17
- Label: Parlophone; Warner Bros.
- Songwriters: Damon Albarn; George Benson
- Producers: Gorillaz; James Ford; Remi Kabaka Jr.

Gorillaz singles chronology
| "Andromeda (D.R.A.M. Special)" (2017) | "Humility" (2018) | "Lake Zurich" (2018) |

George Benson singles chronology
| "Show Me the Love" (2010) | "Humility" (2018) |

Audio sample
- file; help

Music video
- "Humility" on YouTube

"Humility" is a single by British virtual band Gorillaz featuring American jazz guitarist George Benson. It was released on 31 May 2018 along with "Lake Zurich" as the first single from their sixth studio album, The Now Now. On 12 July 2018, two remixes of the song by Superorganism and DJ Koze were released. It charted in a total of 8 countries reaching number 85 on the US Billboard Hot 100, with its highest position in any chart being number 7 on Billboard's Hot Rock Songs chart.

== Promotion and release ==
The song was first announced on 30 May 2018 when Zane Lowe confirmed The Now Now's release and stated that Damon Albarn would be debuting the song on the Beats 1 program the following day. The next day, the song debuted with a music video featuring Jack Black and was digitally released along with another single, "Lake Zurich". On 13 May 2022, the music video was re-uploaded to the Gorillaz YouTube channel with commentary from virtual band member Murdoc Niccals.

== Music video ==
2-D and Black as seen in the video.

The music video for the song was filmed in Venice Beach, Los Angeles, California and features Jack Black.

It begins with footage of 2-D roller-skating around Venice Beach interspersed with shots of Black playing a guitar. This sequence appears multiple times throughout the video, mainly in between the appearances of the different Gorillaz members. After the opening sequence, Noodle is shown checkmating Remi Kabaka, one of the producers for The Now Now and the voice actor of Russel, during a round of chess. Ace Copular, Murdoc's temporary replacement, is then seen observing two men play basketball in front of a mural of George Benson. After a player makes a successful dunk, Ace deflates the ball with a pocketknife, ending the game. After this, various video clips of local residents are shown. Near the end of the video, Russel can be seen standing on the side of the boardwalk. When 2-D skates in his direction, he extends his leg and trips him. When 2-D recovers, his white eyes turn black, and he attempts to skate again, only to end up falling.

The video was produced by The Line in collaboration with Blinkink and Ruffian, with rotoscoping by Trace VFX. It was directed by Gorillaz co-creator Jamie Hewlett and co-directed by Tim McCourt, Max Taylor, and Evan Silver.

== Remixes ==
On 12 July 2018, a single containing two remixes of the song by British indie pop band Superorganism and German EDM producer DJ Koze was released. The Superorganism remix adds lead singer Orono Noguchi's voice to the song along with a snippet of rap lyrics from another Gorillaz song, "Clint Eastwood", while the DJ Koze remix is mostly instrumental.

== Personnel ==
- Damon Albarn – vocals, synthesizer, guitar, additional drum programming
- George Benson – guitar, additional vocals
- James Ford – bass guitar, synthesizer, drums
- Remi Kabaka Jr. – percussion, drum programming
- John Davis – mastering engineer
- Mark DeCozio – additional engineering
- Samuel Egglenton – engineering assistant
- Stephen Sedgwick – mixing engineer, recording engineer, engineering

== Charts ==
=== Weekly charts ===
| Chart (2018) | Peak position |
|---|---|
| Argentina Anglo (Monitor Latino) | 16 |
| Belgium (Ultratop 50 Flanders) | 49 |
| Belgium (Ultratip Bubbling Under Wallonia) | 45 |
| Canada Hot 100 (Billboard) | 74 |
| France (SNEP) | 93 |
| Ireland (IRMA) | 72 |
| Japan Hot Overseas (Billboard) | 17 |
| Mexico Ingles Airplay (Billboard) | 32 |
| New Zealand Heatseekers (RMNZ) | 6 |
| UK Singles (Official Charts) | 81 |
| US Billboard Hot 100 | 85 |
| US Adult Alternative Airplay (Billboard) | 14 |
| US Hot Rock & Alternative Songs (Billboard) | 7 |
| US Rock & Alternative Airplay (Billboard) | 41 |

=== Year-end charts ===
| Chart (2018) | Position |
|---|---|
| US Hot Rock Songs (Billboard) | 52 |
