= Tranz =

2018 single by Gorillaz

Single by Gorillaz

from the album The Now Now
- Released: 14 September 2018
- Studio: Studio 13, London
- Genre: Krautrock; new wave; synth-pop; synth rock
- Length: 2:42
- Label: Parlophone; Warner Bros.
- Songwriter: Damon Albarn
- Producers: Gorillaz; James Ford; Remi Kabaka Jr.

Gorillaz singles chronology
"Hollywood" (2018)	"Tranz" (2018)	"Momentary Bliss" (2020)

Music video
- "Tranz" on YouTube

"Tranz" (Note: Pronounced "trance".) is a song by British virtual band Gorillaz. It was released on 14 September 2018 with a music video as the sixth and final single from their sixth studio album, The Now Now. On 28 September 2018, a remix of the song by British electronic musician Poté was released. The song charted at #16 on the Billboard's Hot Rock Songs.

== Music video ==
The music video begins with a neon title card that says "Gorillaz TRANZ" that lights up before going back to dark. The video then transitions to the band doing a performance of the song in a live setting with a psychedelic background featuring various patterns and shapes. It begins with a close up of 2-D's face that zooms out as the song begins to start. It then zooms out to the full band in the order of Russel, Noodle, and finally Ace all playing their respective instruments. As the chorus starts, the background begins to change faster, into more colourful patterns, as 2-D spreads his arms and bright lights begin to shine out of his eyes. There is then a sequence of each member playing an instrument, starting with 2-D on the keyboard, Russel on drums, Ace on bass, and Noodle on guitar. The video becomes distorted and transitions to 2-D's arms spread out and eyes glowing. The sequence of characters playing their instrument plays again, but this time heavily distorted. Then, a close up of 2-D's face blowing in the wind is shown. It then shows the two 2-Ds facing each other with another 2-D coming out the mouth of one and into the other, followed by 2-D bending and flopping to the rhythm of the music. There is then a stop motion claymation sequence of 2-D with a runny nose and another of 2-D with a rotting tongue. At the end of the video, the bending 2-D figure falls to the ground.

The music video for "Tranz" was directed by Blinkink and Eddy, and was directed by Jamie Hewlett & Nicos Livesey. The video also features original claymation portions from Lee Hardcastle, and 3D animation by Marco Mori, Erik Ferguson, and Oliver Latta. Hewlett revealed in an interview that the music video was planned to have a spoken introduction where Ace would have a conversation with 2-D, but the process of getting Cartoon Network's approval for Ace's dialogue as well as the cost of bringing in voice actor Jeff Bennett proved too expensive.

The video is the first Gorillaz music video to show all four Gorillaz members playing their respective instruments since "Feel Good Inc." in 2005.

In 2019, Superplastic released a 2-D vinyl figure based on his appearance in the video.

== Personnel ==
- Damon Albarn – vocals, synthesizers, guitar
- James Ford – bass guitar, guitar, drums
- Remi Kabaka Jr. – production, drum programming
- John Davis – mastering engineer
- Samuel Egglenton – engineering assistant
- Stephen Sedgwick – mixing engineer, recording engineer, engineering

== Charts ==
Chart (2018)	Peak position
US Hot Rock & Alternative Songs (Billboard)	16
