= Désolé (Gorillaz song) =

2020 single by Gorillaz featuring Fatoumata Diawara

Single by Gorillaz featuring Fatoumata Diawara

from the album Song Machine, Season One: Strange Timez
- Language: English; French; Bambara
- Released: 27 February 2020
- Recorded: 2019
- Studio: Studio 13 (London, UK); La Seine (Paris, France); Edac (Como, Italy)
- Genre: R&B; bossa nova
- Length: 3:56 (single version); 5:33 (album version)
- Label: Parlophone; Warner
- Songwriters: Damon Albarn; Fatoumata Diawara; James Ford; Remi Kabaka Jr.
- Producers: Gorillaz; James Ford; Remi Kabaka Jr.

Gorillaz singles chronology
"Momentary Bliss" (2020)	"Désolé" (2020)	"Aries" (2020)

Fatoumata Diawara singles chronology
"Cameroon" (2019)	"Désolé" (2020)	"Douha (Mali Mali)" (2020)

Music video
- "Désolé" on YouTube

"Désolé" (English: "Sorry") is a song by British virtual band Gorillaz featuring Malian singer Fatoumata Diawara. The track was released on 27 February 2020 as the second single for Gorillaz' seventh studio album, Song Machine, Season One: Strange Timez. The song was part of the Song Machine project, a web series which involved the release of various Gorillaz tracks featuring different guest musicians over the course of 2020.

== Music video ==
2-D as seen in the video

The video, directed by Jamie Hewlett, Tim McCourt, and Max Taylor, was filmed at Lake Como in Italy and mainly features band members 2-D, Noodle and Russel Hobbs boating with Diawara and Gorillaz co-creator Damon Albarn after having been transported to the lake via a portal inside Kong Studios, the band's fictional headquarters. Throughout the video, virtual bassist Murdoc Niccals can be seen inside Kong Studios, attempting and failing to cross the portal.

== Release ==
In a press release, fictional band member Russel said of the song's recording: "Making 'Désolé' with Fatou was a real moment for me, you know. She's an African Queen. This lady made the song what it is, beautiful, like life. What can I say about 'Désolé'? They say sorry is the hardest word, but that's not true... Try saying antidisestablishmentarianism with a mouth full of gluten-free cronuts on a speed boat without licking your lips."

== Track listing ==
No.	Title	Writer(s)	Producers	Length
1.	"Machine Bitez #4" (with 2-D and Murdoc)			0:35
2.	"Désolé" (featuring Fatoumata Diawara)	Damon Albarn; Remi Kabaka Jr.; Diawara; James Ford	Gorillaz; Ford; Kabaka	3:56
3.	"Machine Bitez #5" (with 2-D and Fatoumata Diawara)			0:45
Total length:				5:16

== Personnel ==
Gorillaz

- Damon Albarn – vocals, instrumentation, director, keyboards, bass, guitar, drum programming
- Jamie Hewlett – artwork, character design, video direction
- Remi Kabaka Jr. – percussion

Additional musicians & personnel

- Fatoumata Diawara – vocals
- Voice Messengers (Note: The "Voice Messengers" consist of Sylvain Bellegarde, Emmanuel Laniece, Augustin Ledieu, Vanina de Franco, and Neima Naouri) – backing vocals
- James Ford – keyboards, percussion, balafon, drums, zither
- Davide Rossi – strings, string arranger
- Alice Pratley – violin
- Ciara Ismail – violin
- Izzi Dunn – cello
- Nicola Hicks – viola
- Sébastien Blanchon – horn
- Adrien Libmann – engineering
- Andrea Fognini – engineering
- Davide Lasala – engineering
- John Davis – mastering engineer
- Nora Fedrigo – engineering
- Samuel Egglenton – engineering
- Stephen Sedgwick – mixing engineer, engineering
- Sylvain Mercier – engineering

== Charts ==
Chart (2020)	Peak position
Belgium (Ultratip Bubbling Under Flanders)	34
US Hot Rock & Alternative Songs (Billboard)	16
