= Strange Timez =

2020 single by Gorillaz featuring Robert Smith

Single by Gorillaz featuring Robert Smith

from the album Song Machine, Season One: Strange Timez
- Released: 9 September 2020
- Recorded: 2020
- Studio: Studio 13 (London, UK); The Barn (Devon, UK); RS@Home (Sussex, UK)
- Genre: Electropop; post-punk; synth-pop; dark wave
- Length: 3:47
- Label: Parlophone; Warner
- Songwriters: Damon Albarn; Remi Kabaka Jr.; Robert Smith
- Producers: Gorillaz; Remi Kabaka Jr.; Robert Smith

Gorillaz singles chronology
"Pac-Man" (2020)	"Strange Timez" (2020)	"The Pink Phantom" (2020)

Robert Smith singles chronology
"It Never Was the Same" (2015)	"Strange Timez" (2020)	"How Not to Drown" (2021)

Music video
- "Strange Timez" on YouTube

"Strange Timez" is a song by British virtual band Gorillaz featuring The Cure frontman, Robert Smith. The track was released on 9 September 2020 as the seventh single for Gorillaz' seventh studio album, Song Machine, Season One: Strange Timez, and the sixth episode of the Song Machine project, a web series that involved the release of various Gorillaz tracks featuring different guest musicians over the course of 2020.

== Background ==
The song was first teased at the end of the "Pac-Man" music video, where the opening tune of the song played over an announcement that Song Machine would return in September. It is the first single from Song Machine to be recorded during the COVID-19 pandemic, with Albarn mentioning that the track was recorded over email with Smith.

== Music video ==
The video, directed by Jamie Hewlett, Tim McCourt, and Max Taylor, features the band members going on a trip to the Moon. 2-D stares at the Earth, Noodle blows up a billboard on the Moon, Russel performs donuts with the vehicle on the Moon's surface, and Murdoc discovers a Monolith on the Moon. When he stepped through it, it teleported him back to Earth, right outside of Kong Studios. The video ends with the message "Be the Change" written out of craters on the Moon's surface.

== Track listing ==
No.	Title	Writer(s)	Producers	Length
1.	"Machine Bitez #12" (with 2-D, Murdoc, Russel and Noodle)			0:30
2.	"Strange Timez" (featuring Robert Smith)	Damon Albarn; Remi Kabaka Jr.; Smith	Gorillaz; Smith; Kabaka	3:47
3.	"Machine Bitez #13" (with 2-D, Murdoc, Russel and Noodle)			0:46
4.	"Strange Timez" (Robert Smith AURORA Remix)			4:58
Total length:				10:01

== Personnel ==
Gorillaz

- Damon Albarn – vocals, instrumentation, director, keyboards, bass
- Jamie Hewlett – artwork, character design, video direction
- Remi Kabaka Jr. – drum programming, percussion

Additional musicians and personnel

- Robert Smith – vocals, guitar, keyboards, bass guitar, music box
- Etta Albarn Teulon – trumpet
- John Davis – mastering engineer
- Samuel Egglenton – engineering
- Stephen Sedgwick – mixing engineer, engineering
