= Momentary Bliss =

Single by Gorillaz featuring Slowthai and Slaves

from the album Song Machine, Season One: Strange Timez
- Released: 30 January 2020
- Recorded: November 2019
- Studio: Studio 13 (London, UK); Dean's List House of Hits (Cypress, Texas, US)
- Genre: Punk rock; electronic; pop-punk; ska; hip hop; Britpop; reggae rock
- Length: 3:41
- Label: Parlophone; Warner
- Songwriters: Damon Albarn; Tyron Frampton; Isaac Holman · Laurie Vincent; Remi Kabaka Jr.; Mike Dean
- Producers: Gorillaz; Mike Dean; Remi Kabaka Jr.

Gorillaz singles chronology
"Tranz" (2018)	"Momentary Bliss" (2020)	"Désolé" (2020)

Slowthai singles chronology
"Deal Wiv It" (2019)	"Momentary Bliss" (2020)	"Enemy" (2020)

Slaves singles chronology
"Magnolia" (2018)	"Momentary Bliss" (2020)	"One More Day Won't Hurt" (2020)

Music video
- "Momentary Bliss" on YouTube

"Momentary Bliss" is a song by British virtual band Gorillaz, featuring British rapper Slowthai and the Kent-based punk rock duo Slaves. The song was the first song to be released for Gorillaz' Song Machine initiative, a web series consisting of singles and music videos released over the course of the year from the band, with each episode featuring different guest musicians. The song was also the first single released for their seventh studio album, Song Machine, Season One: Strange Timez. This was the final single before Slaves changed their band name to "Soft Play".

== Background and recording ==
"Momentary Bliss" was recorded in the summer of 2019 at Damon Albarn's Studio 13 in West London. Albarn had previously worked with Slaves as part of the Africa Express project, with the band also previously working with Slowthai on his album Nothing Great About Britain, on the song "Missing".

The song was announced as being the first of eleven tracks to be released from Gorillaz' Song Machine initiative, which sees the band release a new song every month with previously unannounced collaborators. Damon Albarn and Remi Kabaka spoke to BBC Radio 1's Annie Mac for the song's official premiere, saying that Song Machine "may have an obtuse narrative arc at the end of each season, but it's more Ozark, than Designated Survivor. You just keep going until you run out of ideas."

A press release was put out to explain the initiative further, with virtual Gorillaz member Russel Hobbs saying: "Song Machine is a whole new way of doing what we do, Gorillaz breaking the mould 'cos the mould got old. World is moving faster than a supercharged particle, so we've gotta stay ready to drop. We don't even know who's stepping through the studio next. Song Machine feeds on the unknown, runs on pure chaos. So whatever the hell's coming, we're primed and ready to produce like there's no tomorrow."

== Composition ==
Critics have described the single as punk rock, electronic, pop-punk, ska, hip hop, britpop and reggae rock. Mark Beaumont of The Independent described the song as “sci-fi ska”. Thereafter, Thomas Smith of NME noted the punk timbre, describing the song as a “punk rager”.

Damon Albarn utilizes an interpolation of the chorus of "Lovely Rita" by The Beatles; this interpolation takes place before Slowthai's first verse, before 2-D's verse, and in both Holman's intro and ending chorus.

== Music video ==
The song's music video was filmed at Albarn's studio in West London, featuring both Slowthai and Slaves. The video which premiered on 30 January 2020 features the band's animated characters recording the song with guests. The video also marked the return of Murdoc Niccals, who had been absent from the band's sixth studio album The Now Now.

In the video, directed by Jamie Hewlett, Tim McCourt, and Max Taylor, Murdoc attempts to poison Albarn's drink during a recording session but ends up becoming sick after observing no side effects and testing the poison on himself.

== Tracklist ==
No.	Title	Writer(s)	Producers	Length
1.	"Machine Bitez #1" (with 2-D, Murdoc and Russel)			0:43
2.	"Momentary Bliss" (featuring Slowthai and Slaves)	Damon Albarn; Remi Kabaka Jr.; Tyron Frampton; Laurie Vincent · Isaac Holman; Mike Dean	Gorillaz; Dean; Kabaka	3:41
3.	"Machine Bitez #2" (with 2-D and Slaves)			0:56
4.	"Machine Bitez #3" (with 2-D and Slowthai)			1:01
Total length:				6:21

== Personnel ==
Gorillaz

- Damon Albarn – vocals, instrumentation, director, guitar
- Jamie Hewlett – artwork, character design, video direction
- Remi Kabaka Jr. – drum programming

Additional musicians and personnel

- Slowthai – vocals
- Laurie Vincent – guitar, vocals
- Isaac Holman – drums, vocals
- Mike Dean – drum programming
- Stephen Sedgwick – mixing engineer, engineering
- Samuel Egglenton – engineering
- John Davis – mastering engineer

== Charts ==
Chart (2020)	Peak position
Belgium (Ultratip Bubbling Under Flanders)	29
Ireland (IRMA)	74
New Zealand Hot Singles (RMNZ)	17
UK Singles (Official Charts)	58
US Hot Rock & Alternative Songs (Billboard)	3
