= Song Machine =

Gorillaz web series

- Song Machine title card
- Genre: Music video
- Created by: Gorillaz
- Directed by: Jamie Hewlett; Tim McCourt; Max Taylor
- Voices of: Phil Cornwell; Kevin Bishop; Haruka Abe; Remi Kabaka Jr.
- Theme music composer: Gorillaz
- Opening theme: "Song Machine Theme Tune"
- Composer: Gorillaz
- Country of origin: United Kingdom
- Original language: English
- No. of seasons: 1
- No. of episodes: 9

Production
- Executive producer: Jamie Hewlett
- Producers: Eva Dahlqvist; Samia Ahmed; Laurence Moss; Lisa A. Smith; Skye van der Walt
- Animators: Venla Linna; Simone Cirillo; Setareh Seto; Diego Porral; Amanda Holm; Alvise Zennaro; Tim McCourt; Marc Valls; Peter Baynton; Kristian Antonelli; Pierre Rutz; Mattieu Petit
- Editor: Jamie Hewlett
- Camera setup: Camera phone; single-camera
- Running time: 4–6 minutes
- Production companies: The Line; Gorillaz Productions

Original release
- Network: YouTube
- Release: 30 January – 24 December 2020

Song Machine is an audiovisual project by English virtual band Gorillaz. It is a music video web series consisting of a collection of music videos and singles that are released monthly by the band as episodes of the series, with each episode featuring additional guests. Each episode is released with accompanying interludes called "Machine Bitez", a series of skits consisting of short conversations and interviews with Song Machine's guests from Gorillaz' virtual band members. The project was officially launched on 30 January 2020. Season one of Song Machine consists of 9 episodes and was released as an album titled Song Machine, Season One: Strange Timez on 23 October 2020. A second season was announced in 2020, though it was later scrapped in favor of Cracker Island.

== Background ==
=== Premise ===
Song Machine centers around the adventures of British virtual band Gorillaz and the various events they experience through their haunted headquarters at a newly revamped and relocated Kong Studios, which contains various portals through which the band visit the guests and transport them to Kong, while recording music for their newest project, Song Machine.

Episodes of Song Machine are accompanied by short segments called "Machine Bitez", a series of character skits featuring snippets of conversations and interviews with Song Machine's guests from Gorillaz' virtual band members. Some episodes take on an interview format between 2-D and a Song Machine collaborator, while others involve the Gorillaz band members discussing the production and process of creating the music or the events that took place in an episode.

=== Characters ===
Gorillaz from left to right: 2-D, Murdoc, Noodle, and Russel

- 2-D (voiced by Kevin Bishop) – The lead vocalist and keyboardist of Gorillaz. Gorillaz' actual co-founder Damon Albarn provides 2-D's singing voice.
- Murdoc Niccals (voiced by Phil Cornwell) – The bassist and leader of Gorillaz.
- Noodle (voiced by Haruka Abe) – The lead guitarist and occasional backup vocalist of Gorillaz.
- Russel Hobbs (voiced by Remi Kabaka Jr.) – The drummer and percussionist of Gorillaz.

=== Setting ===
Song Machine is mainly set in Gorillaz' haunted headquarters at Kong Studios, relocated to West London from its original location in West Sussex. In Song Machine, Kong Studios contains various portals that can teleport Gorillaz to various locations across the world. The characters will sometimes refer to these portals as a Phantom Tollbooth, in reference to the 1970 film and 1961 book of the same name. More often than not, these portals are used to gather guests for Song Machine, but have been used for other purposes as well. In "Aries", the band are transported through the portal to the North African country of Morocco for a race. This version of Kong Studios, like the previous incarnation, is subject to paranormal activity, the most prominent example being The Pink Phantom from the episode of the same name. This version of Kong Studios is based on Gorillaz' recording studio at Studio 13, which was created in 1998 by Damon Albarn for he and Gorillaz co-creator Jamie Hewlett to produce their material. Studio 13 was originally going to be a part of the main setting of Gorillaz during Humanz, where Gorillaz were going to record material in a fictional replica of Studio 13 that was set next to it called Studio 14.

== Production ==
Song Machine began production in summer of 2019, with "Momentary Bliss" being the first episode produced. All episodes of Song Machine are produced by Gorillaz Productions, a production company formed by Damon Albarn and Jamie Hewlett that has been used since the 2019 Gorillaz documentary Reject False Icons to produce and release new material. As with other media, Song Machine's production was mildly affected by the COVID-19 pandemic, with work on the series continuing to be done remotely through e-mails and Zoom sessions, starting with "Strange Timez".

=== Music ===
According to Albarn, the original idea for Song Machine's music was for there to be two collaborators recording with Gorillaz for a track on separate floors at Studio 13, without hearing either of each other's contributions. Song Machine eventually became an album, but this was not Albarn and Hewlett's original intention and they initially created Song Machine to be purely episodic, with Albarn stating that listening to the album was "like listening to an entirely different entity". Albarn has stated that Song Machine was created because he became tired of the typical six-month time period that making an album takes. While older guests for Song Machine are mainly chosen by Albarn and Hewlett, younger guests are chosen by Gorillaz drummer Remi Kabaka Jr., an official non-virtual member of the band since Humanz. Albarn says of the album version of season one, "It's one of the best albums I've ever made. It's really strong because every tune has that single intention to it. To make an album of singles is such a rigorous pursuit you don't normally do it – but accidentally, we have." Albarn has also mentioned that there will eventually be a season two, and that it could possibly begin as early as February 2021, with seasons potentially being released back to back. Music from season one of Song Machine features additional co-production from Mike Will Made It, Prince Paul, James Ford, P2J, Mike Dean, Robert Smith, Joan As Police Woman, and Marzeratti. As per Gorillaz' usual approach, Song Machine explores a multitude of different musical genres, thus far including punk rock, hip-hop, R&B, bossa nova, reggae, synth-pop, electronic, acid house, and downtempo.

=== Animation ===
Song Machine is directed by Gorillaz co-creator Jamie Hewlett and produced by UK-based animation studio The Line, being co-directed by animators Tim McCourt and Max Taylor, who previously worked on the music video for "Humility". The videography and camera work on the episodes "Momentary Bliss" and "Désolé" are provided by Gorillaz co-creator Damon Albarn's daughter Missy Albarn along with Hewlett. The episodes are edited by Hewlett himself. Song Machine was originally inspired by 60s children's series like The Banana Splits, and by the binge-watching format of online streaming services. Gorillaz co-creator Jamie Hewlett has mentioned that the art style for Song Machine was inspired by the artwork for the first Gorillaz album, which was inspired by classic Hanna-Barbera cartoons and Looney Tunes animator Chuck Jones. As per Gorillaz' usual visual approach, Song Machine blends various styles of animation with live-action. While Gorillaz themselves appear in Song Machine in their usual two-dimensional animated form, guests are generally filmed in live-action and episodes are typically set in a live-action or CGI environment. Elton John has been the only guest on Song Machine to appear in animated form. Song Machine was originally going to be set around Kong Studios (Studio 13) with the animation of the characters added into filmed footage of Song Machine's recording sessions, but this was later made impossible after work had to be done remotely due to the COVID-19 pandemic and Hewlett ran out of Studio 13 footage. This caused Hewlett to change the setting of the storyline for Song Machine, starting with "Strange Timez" being set in space. "The Valley of the Pagans" was created using the director mode of Grand Theft Auto V.

== Release ==
On 28 January 2020, the band officially released images via social media teasing a concept entitled Song Machine. A 23-second promotional single entitled "Song Machine Theme Tune" was released on streaming services with an accompanying video. On 29 January 2020, the first "Machine Bitez" was posted on YouTube and music streaming services. Song Machine's first episode, "Momentary Bliss" officially premiered on YouTube on 30 January 2020, and the single was subsequently released on music streaming platforms. After the premiere, additional "Machine Bitez" featuring interviews with "Momentary Bliss" collaborators Slowthai and Slaves by Gorillaz' virtual frontman 2-D were also uploaded to YouTube and music streaming services. A limited edition art print and additional merchandise was then put up for sale on Gorillaz' online shop following the episode's premiere. Each episode of Song Machine is proceeded by a 10-second snippet teasing the next episode. Episode three, "Aries", ends with a snippet followed by a brief message from Gorillaz virtual band member 2-D informing viewers to stay safe amid the COVID-19 pandemic.

Damon Albarn and Remi Kabaka Jr. spoke to BBC Radio 1's Annie Mac for the official premiere of the series, with Albarn saying that Song Machine "may have an obtuse narrative arc at the end of each season, but it's more Ozark, than Designated Survivor. You just keep going until you run out of ideas." He also revealed that the group had been in the studio with Schoolboy Q and Sampa the Great among others, although he did say that these songs were likely to be saved for future series of Song Machine. The group also teased a possible collaboration with Australian band Tame Impala on Instagram. A press release was put out to explain Song Machine further, with virtual Gorillaz member Russel Hobbs saying: "Song Machine is a whole new way of doing what we do, Gorillaz breaking the mould 'cos the mould got old. World is moving faster than a supercharged particle, so we've gotta stay ready to drop. We don't even know who's stepping through the studio next. Song Machine feeds on the unknown, runs on pure chaos. So whatever the hell's coming, we're primed and ready to produce like there's no tomorrow."

On 9 September 2020, during the premiere of "Strange Timez", it was announced that Song Machine was going to be released as a full studio album called Song Machine, Season One: Strange Timez with eleven tracks (seventeen on the deluxe edition), featuring guest appearances from artists such as Elton John, Robert Smith, Peter Hook, Beck, St. Vincent, Schoolboy Q, Octavian, 6lack, JPEGMafia, Chai, and various others. In an interview with Albarn on 15 October 2020, he revealed that he planned for season two to begin in the future, hinting at a possible February 2021 window, and expressing excitement for the potential of more seasons being recorded and released "back to back". However February did not see season two being released, with soon the project was scrapped, and instead released as a stand-alone studio album Cracker Island in 2023.

=== Promotion ===
On 12 September 2019, Gorillaz began posting a series of postcards attributed to the characters to their social media pages, with each postcard from a different part of the world, mentioning a machine and asking if the others were ready to start it. They would later begin to post a series of playlists attributed to each character on Spotify entitled “Wish You Were Ear”, and later another series of character-attributed Spotify playlists themed around a fictional festival called the Maydeup Festival, with an imaginary poster featuring a fake lineup for the festival made for the playlists. On 26 November 2019, Gorillaz put a set of holiday merchandise featuring the characters in a new look up for sale on their official online store. Afterwards, "Song Machine Theme Tune" was posted on the band's social media pages on 28 January 2020 and the series made its premiere two days later.

"Momentary Bliss" was accompanied by the first in a series of threads on Gorillaz band member Murdoc's official Twitter account called "Debunked With Murdoc Niccals", where Murdoc interacted with fans on Twitter to questions about episodes of the series. This lasted until the episode "Aries". On 7 April 2020, Gorillaz announced "Get Lost with Gorillaz", a series of fictional telegrams following the characters and the activity they've partaken in while social distancing during quarantine. A series of behind-the-scenes footage called "NoodleCam" which featured seconds long behind-the-scenes clips of the Song Machine sessions interspersed with a still image of Noodle were published on the band's Instagram stories and accompanied the release of each episode up until "Pac-Man". When Song Machine episodes are premiered live on YouTube, there are usually appearances from the characters in the live chat and comments section of the episodes. An online driving game based on "Aries" was published to Gorillaz' official website on 4 September 2020.

Song Machine went on a two month long hiatus after the release of "Pac-Man". Leading up to the premiere of "Strange Timez", the band began posting a series of recaps of previous episodes on social media and uploading lyric videos of the previous episodes on YouTube soon afterwards. On 15 October 2020, the band began posting snippets of Song Machine, Season One: Strange Timez' cassette editions online, starting with Noodle's.

== Episodes ==
=== Season 1 (2020) ===
No.	Title	Directed by	Release date	Ref
1	"Momentary Bliss"	Jamie Hewlett, Tim McCourt, and Max Taylor	30 January 2020	
In the series premiere of Song Machine, Murdoc tries to poison Damon Albarn's drink during the recording session, but when he sees no side effects, he tests the poison on himself, causing him to get very sick. "Machine Bitez #2 and #3" are interviews by 2-D with "Momentary Bliss" guests Slaves and Slowthai.
2	"Désolé"	Jamie Hewlett, Tim McCourt, and Max Taylor	27 February 2020	
"Désolé" – the second episode of Song Machine – features guest Fatoumata Diawara and depicts Gorillaz as they teleport to Lake Como through a portal in Kong Studios. Being Episode 2, it accompanies 2-D, Noodle, and Russel, boating on Lake Como, while leaving bandmate Murdoc behind. "Machine Bitez #5" is an interview by 2-D with Diawara.
3	"Aries"	Jamie Hewlett and Tim McCourt	9 April 2020	
After 2-D, Noodle, and Russel abandon Murdoc to visit Lake Como through a portal in Kong Studios in "Désolé", Murdoc and 2-D team up (much to Noodle's concern) in a race around Morocco against bandmates Noodle and Russel, with 2-D oblivious to Murdoc's plans to inject him with a truth serum. The cover artwork for the "Aries" single depicts the immediate aftermath of the episode, with an injured 2-D exposing his scar from Murdoc's syringe injection and Russel beating up Murdoc in response, as Noodle pulls him off of him to de-escalate the situation.
4	"Friday 13th"	Jamie Hewlett, Tim McCourt, and Max Taylor	9 June 2020	
"Friday 13th" features footage of 2-D, Noodle, Murdoc and Russel that was self-filmed at home during lockdown shortly following the fight that took place proceeding "Aries". The episode shows the characters with significant injuries on their bodies, placed against a live-action backdrops of street roads and tunnels. The guest of this episode is French-British rapper and singer Octavian.
5	"Pac-Man"	Jamie Hewlett, Tim McCourt, and Max Taylor	20 July 2020	
2-D becomes addicted to a Gorillaz-themed Pac-Man arcade machine built by Murdoc while he builds a portal of his own after being left behind in "Désolé". "Machine Bitez #11" is an interview by 2-D with "Pac-Man" guest Schoolboy Q
6	"Strange Timez"	Jamie Hewlett, Tim McCourt, and Max Taylor	9 September 2020	
"Strange Timez" shows 2-D, Murdoc, Russel, and Noodle as they voyage to outer space to explore the Moon and embellish it with the message "Be the Change" for the world to see. In the midst of their journey, Murdoc enters a portal that appears on the Moon which leads him into a void that lands him back to Kong Studios, with the rest of the bandmates then flying back to Earth.
7	"The Pink Phantom"	Jamie Hewlett, Tim McCourt, and Max Taylor	1 October 2020	
In a homage to 1960s MGM cartoon The Pink Panther, 2-D, an animated Elton John, and a holographic 6lack perform in a dark lit room in Kong Studios as Murdoc attempts to capture a ghost that's been haunting Kong called The Pink Phantom. Russel and Noodle do not appear in the music video, but are in all of the episode's accompanying "Machine Bitez".
8	"The Valley of the Pagans"	Jamie Hewlett, Tim McCourt, and Max Taylor	5 November 2020	
Gorillaz and Beck go on a road trip on a highway through a Kong Studios portal as "The Valley of the Pagans" plays through the car stereo. Afterwards, the band re-enters the portal to go home, but the portal instead takes them to Plastic Beach and the car crashes into the sea.
9	"The Lost Chord"	Jamie Hewlett, Tim McCourt, and Max Taylor	24 December 2020	
Following the events of "The Valley of the Pagans", Gorillaz find themselves on Plastic Beach, where the island is destroyed by Leee John in the form of a giant humanoid sea creature. At the last second, a portal opens and Russel, Noodle, and 2-D enter it, leaving Murdoc behind briefly, but the portal reopens with 2-D saving Murdoc.

== Reception ==
Song Machine has been noted by critics for its unique approach to releasing music.

Brian Hillsman of The Cosmic Clash gave Song Machine a positive review and called it the band's best work, saying of the project "As Song Machine gradually releases to the public, it will certainly morph into an addiction, a cultural phenomenon that will have listeners hooked and eagerly awaiting each successive episode.". Affinity Magazine called Song Machine one of Gorillaz' most ambitious projects to date, saying that it's "a testament to their unique take on the music industry". Meanwhile, DIY Mag calls Song Machine "the greatest new music TV series going".

== Related media ==
=== Book ===
Gorillaz Almanac is a graphic novel based on Gorillaz published in partnership with comic book publisher Z2 Comics. Announced on 26 May 2020 via social media, Gorillaz Almanac was released in December 2020. Inspired by the famous British hardcover annual of the same name, Gorillaz Almanac contains over 200 pages, featuring extra content such as comic strips, new and old artwork, puzzles, games, and special guest appearances from various Gorillaz collaborators from throughout the years. Gorillaz Almanac comes in three editions: standard edition, deluxe edition, and super deluxe edition. The deluxe edition of the Gorillaz Almanac was limited to 6,666 copies and includes four additional art prints and a sticker sheet signed by the characters, while the super deluxe edition was limited to 200 copies and comes in a unique package signed by Jamie Hewlett. Each edition of Gorillaz Almanac comes with a physical copy of Song Machine, Season One: Strange Timez' standard edition on CD.

=== Album ===
Song Machine, Season One: Strange Timez is a studio album by Gorillaz that contain the eleven episodes of the Song Machine web series as tracks on the album, plus several bonus tracks. The bonus tracks for the album are tracks that will not be released as episodes of the web series. A physical copy of the Song Machine, Season One: Strange Timez standard edition will also be included with all copies of the upcoming Gorillaz graphic novel Gorillaz Almanac. Song Machine, Season One: Strange Timez comes in various editions, and will be released on CD, vinyl, and cassette. The deluxe vinyl edition of Song Machine, Season One: Strange Timez comes with three 12" art prints, a 20-page hardback art book with original art by Jamie Hewlett, and a Song Machine CD. The exclusive super deluxe vinyl box set includes eleven 7" singles with instrumentals and eleven 12" art prints, as well as a music box that plays "Song Machine Theme Tune". Four exclusive cassette editions featuring alternate track list orders were made only available on the official Gorillaz store, with each cassette attributed to a different Gorillaz character.

=== Radio show ===
On 16 October 2020, the band announced a broadcast radio show on Apple Music named Song Machine Radio with Gorillaz, which premiered on 19 October 2020. Song Machine Radio with Gorillaz is a monthly hour-long four-part Apple Music program hosted by the characters, with each episode featuring personalized music selections, special guests appearances and various discussions. The series also contains segments featuring Gorillaz co-creators Damon Albarn and Jamie Hewlett, and provides hands-on information regarding the making of Song Machine, Season One: Strange Timez.

=== Tour ===
Song Machine was first played live through a set of three international virtual live gigs called Song Machine Live. Officially announced on 17 September 2020, Song Machine Live first broadcast on 12 December 2020, with the performance live streamed across three different time zones. Song Machine Live's first performance was broadcast to Asia, Australia, and New Zealand on 8 pm JST, with its second being for North & South America and starting at 4 pm PST, with its final being set for broadcast to Europe, United Kingdom, and Africa at 7 pm GMT, all of which are broadcast live from London, UK. The concert was performed by the Gorillaz live band in Kong Studios and featured augmented reality appearances from the characters as they were shown in previous Song Machine episodes. The band also announced dates in 2021 for festivals such as Rock Werchter and Splendour in the Grass. On 18 October 2020, an interview with Albarn revealed that Song Machine Live would eventually show Gorillaz' virtual members performing on stage with the live band members, with the performances switching focus back and forth between the two throughout them. On October 23, 2020, Gorillaz announced the Song Machine Tour in support of season one, beginning in June 2021, with dates in Cologne, Berlin, Luxembourg and London.

=== Merchandise ===
Song Machine has had various merchandise produced for it since "Momentary Bliss" premiered on 30 January 2020. The merchandise for Song Machine is usually a limited edition art print, t-shirt, or sticker sheet that is released on the official online Gorillaz store with the premiere each episode. On 26 November 2019, a month before Song Machine was officially launched, a set of limited edition holiday merchandise featuring artwork of the characters as they appear on the Song Machine title card was released.
