= Song Machine, Season One: Strange Timez =

- Standard edition artwork. Deluxe edition features a pink background and a blue keyboard.

Studio album by Gorillaz
- Released: 23 October 2020
- Recorded: October 2019 – May 2020
- Studio: Studio 13 (London, UK) (Note: All tracks); The Barn (Devon, UK) (Note: Tracks 1-2, 5); Various additional: RS@Home (Sussex, UK) (Note: Track 1); Paul's Coffee Shop (Long Island, New York, US) (Note: Track 4); Fire Garden (Philadelphia, Pennsylvania, US); Compound Fracture (Los Angeles, California, US) (Note: Track 5); LVRN (Atlanta, Georgia, US) (Note: Track 6); Rocket Entertainment (London, UK); Wxllxm (Atlanta, Georgia, US) (Note: Track 9); La Seine (Paris, France) (Note: Track 10); Edac (Como, Italy); Dean's List House of Hits (Cypress, Texas, US) (Note: Track 11)
- Genres: Alternative rock; hip hop; electronic
- Length: 42:55
- Languages: English; Spanish; French; Bambara; Xhosa; Japanese; Yoruba
- Labels: Parlophone; Warner
- Producers: Damon Albarn; Remi Kabaka Jr.; Mike Dean; Mike Will Made It; Marzeratti; James Ford; P2J; Joan As Police Woman; Prince Paul

Gorillaz chronology
The Now Now (2018)	Song Machine, Season One: Strange Timez (2020)	Meanwhile EP (2021)

Damon Albarn chronology
Egoli (2019)	Song Machine, Season One: Strange Timez (2020)	Meanwhile EP (2021)

Singles from Song Machine, Season One: Strange Timez
- 1. "Momentary Bliss" Released: 30 January 2020; 2. "Désolé" Released: 27 February 2020; 3. "Aries" Released: 9 April 2020; 4. "How Far?" Released: 2 May 2020; 5. "Friday 13th" Released: 9 June 2020; 6. "Pac-Man" Released: 20 July 2020; 7. "Strange Timez" Released: 9 September 2020; 8. "The Pink Phantom" Released: 1 October 2020; 9. "The Valley of the Pagans" Released: 5 November 2020

Song Machine, Season One: Strange Timez is the seventh studio album by British virtual band Gorillaz, released on 23 October 2020 through Parlophone and Warner Records.

The album was released as the culmination of Gorillaz's Song Machine project, a web series consisting of singles and music videos featuring various guest artists released episodically throughout 2020. Guest contributors on the album include Slowthai, Slaves, Fatoumata Diawara, Peter Hook, Georgia, Octavian, ScHoolboy Q, Robert Smith, Elton John, 6lack, Beck, Leee John, St. Vincent, and Kano, among others. Seven of the album’s eleven tracks were released as Song Machine episodes prior to the album's release. The album showcases an eclectic mix of genres and influences, reflecting both the diversity of its guest artists and the individualized nature of its recording. The album's producers include James Ford, Prince Paul, Robert Smith, Mike Dean, Mike Will Made It and P2J.

The album debuted at number two on the UK Albums Chart and number twelve on the US Billboard 200. It received positive reviews from critics, who praised its stylistic diversity and high-profile roster of guest collaborators. Due to the COVID-19 pandemic, the album was not supported by a live tour; instead, the band performed in-studio performances broadcast live in December 2020 as "Song Machine Live From Kong."

== Background ==
On 28 January 2020, the band officially released images via social media teasing a concept entitled Song Machine. A 23-second promotional single entitled "Song Machine Theme Tune" was released on streaming services with an accompanying video. Damon Albarn and Remi Kabaka Jr spoke to BBC Radio 1's Annie Mac for the official premiere, saying that Song Machine "may have an obtuse narrative arc at the end of each season, but it's more Ozark, than Designated Survivor. You just keep going until you run out of ideas."

Upon the premiere of Episode One on 30 January, Albarn revealed that the group had been in the studio with Schoolboy Q among others, although he did say that these songs were likely to be saved for future series of Song Machine. A press release was put out to explain Song Machine further, with virtual Gorillaz member Russel Hobbs saying: "Song Machine is a whole new way of doing what we do, Gorillaz breaking the mould 'cos the mould got old. World is moving faster than a supercharged particle, so we've gotta stay ready to drop. We don't even know who's stepping through the studio next. Song Machine feeds on the unknown, runs on pure chaos. So whatever the hell's coming, we're primed and ready to produce like there's no tomorrow."

Episode Two released on 27 February 2020. Despite an initially revealed monthly schedule, no singles were released in March due to the spike of the COVID-19 pandemic. On March 24, the band released a statement via Instagram, reassuring fans that despite "serious times" Song Machine would proceed. Episode Three was then released on 9 April.

On 2 May, a standalone single called "How Far?" was released without any prior announcement in the middle of Season One's release schedule as a tribute to Tony Allen, who died on 30 April, and was a frequent collaborator with Albarn. As a result, Episode Four, originally teased to be up next at the end of the music video for Aries, delayed its release to 9 June. On 13 June, the album was revealed on the Gorillaz website under the name Almanac CD, said to be a 10 track album that would be packaged with the Gorillaz Almanac in October 2020.

After the premiere of Episode Five on 20 July, it was stated that the project would commence a brief hiatus, lasting until an unspecified date in September. On 7 September, it was revealed the band's next single would be titled "Strange Timez", and would feature Robert Smith. Episode Six, the first of the singles to have had its music fully recorded during the pandemic, was released on 9 September, alongside the announcement of the album's title and tracklist.

Episode Seven was released on 1 October. Episode Eight was released on 5 November. Episode Nine was released on 24 December; unlike previous Song Machine releases, the song was not released as a single.

== Musical style ==
Critics have primarily described the record as alternative rock, hip hop, and electronic music. Critics also noted pop, punk rock, indie rock, electropop, psychedelic pop, R&B, funk, soul, bossa nova, reggae, acid house, and downtempo influences in various specified tracks.

Soey Kim of Vogue commented that the record "is an ambitious and chaotic amalgamation of sounds and genres", and further specified that the sound ranged from "punk rock to R&B to hip-hop." Thomas Smith of NME also noted the album's stylistic diversity, stating that the record is a "varied affair that pulls from Albarn and the band's perchance [sic] for exploration: punk rock sits effortlessly next to glitzy piano ballads, while playful hip-hop and melancholic post-rave ambience soothe our pounding heads."

== Critical reception ==
Professional ratings
Aggregate scores
Source	Rating
AnyDecentMusic?	7.6/10
Metacritic	81/100
Review scores
Source	Rating
AllMusic	3.5/5 stars
Clash	4/5 stars
Consequence of Sound	B
Entertainment Weekly	7.5/10
Gigwise	7/10 stars
The Guardian	4/5 stars
The Independent	4/5 stars
Mojo	4/5 stars
NME	4/5 stars
Rolling Stone	3.5/5 stars

According to the review aggregator Metacritic, Song Machine, Season One: Strange Timez received "universal acclaim" based on a weighted average score of 81 out of 100 from 15 critic scores. Aggregator AnyDecentMusic? gave the album a 7.6 out of 10, based on their assessment of the critical consensus.

In a positive review, The Guardian's Alexis Petridis lauded the album’s guest artists, stating "It's not just that the guests demonstrate Albarn's excellent taste in music, although they do – from St Vincent to Octavian to Georgia to Unknown Mortal Orchestra, at least in the deluxe edition tracks – it's what he chooses to do with their voices." Consequence of Sound's Jordan Blum also praised the guest artists, commenting that the album "encapsulates Gorillaz's trademark tongue-in-cheek bizarreness, stylistic flexibility, and enticing incorporation of guest musicians." Blum also praised the album's pacing, stating that the album "flows very smoothly nonetheless, maintaining fluid pacing while also shifting styles with consistent regularity."

== Track listing ==
All tracks are written by Damon Albarn, Remi Kabaka Jr., and the tracks' respective guest(s) and produced by Gorillaz and Remi Kabaka Jr., except where noted.

Song Machine, Season One: Strange Timez – Standard edition
No.	Title	Writer(s)	Producer(s)	Length
1.	"Strange Timez" (featuring Robert Smith)		Gorillaz; Smith; Remi Kabaka Jr.	3:47
2.	"The Valley of the Pagans" (featuring Beck)			3:01
3.	"The Lost Chord" (featuring Leee John)	Damon Albarn; Kabaka; James Ford; Leslie John	Gorillaz; Ford; Kabaka	4:03
4.	"Pac-Man" (featuring Schoolboy Q)	Albarn; Kabaka; John Smythe; Paul Huston; Quincy Hanley; Elvin Shahbazian; Joel McNeill; John McNeill	Gorillaz; Prince Paul; Kabaka	3:12
5.	"Chalk Tablet Towers" (featuring St. Vincent)			3:02
6.	"The Pink Phantom" (featuring Elton John and 6lack)	Albarn; Kabaka; Ricardo Valentine Jr.		4:13
7.	"Aries" (featuring Peter Hook and Georgia)	Albarn; Kabaka; Hook; Richard Isong	Gorillaz; Ford; Kabaka; P2J^{[a]}	4:13
8.	"Friday 13th" (featuring Octavian)			3:37
9.	"Dead Butterflies" (featuring Kano and Roxani Arias)	Albarn; Kabaka; Darryle Gayle; Matthew Middlebrooks; Kane Robinson; Michael Williams II; Arias	Gorillaz; Mike Will Made It; Marzeratti; Kabaka	4:33
10.	"Désolé" (Extended version) (featuring Fatoumata Diawara)	Albarn; Kabaka; Ford; Diawara	Gorillaz; Ford; Kabaka	5:33
11.	"Momentary Bliss" (featuring Slowthai and Slaves)	Albarn; Kabaka; Tyron Frampton; Isaac Holman · Laurie Vincent; Mike Dean	Gorillaz; Kabaka; Dean^{[b]}	3:41
Total length:				42:55

Song Machine, Season One: Strange Timez – Deluxe edition – Disc two
No.	Title	Writer(s)	Producer(s)	Length
1.	"Opium" (featuring EarthGang)	Albarn; Kabaka; Olu Fann · Eian Parker; Isong	Gorillaz; P2J; Kabaka	6:50
2.	"Simplicity" (featuring Joan As Police Woman)		Gorillaz; Joan Wasser; Kabaka	2:44
3.	"Severed Head" (featuring GoldLink and Unknown Mortal Orchestra)			3:34
4.	"With Love to an Ex" (featuring Moonchild Sanelly)			3:01
5.	"MLS" (featuring JPEGMafia and Chai)			3:13
6.	"How Far?" (featuring Tony Allen and Skepta)			2:46
Total length:				22:08

Song Machine, Season One: Strange Timez – Japanese deluxe edition – Disc two bonus track
No.	Title	Length
7.	"Taxi Back to 80s Reykjavik"	2:42
Total length:		24:50

Notes

- ^{^[a]} indicates an additional producer
- ^{^[b]} indicates a co-producer

== Personnel ==
Credits adapted from the liner notes and Tidal.

Gorillaz

- Damon Albarn – production (all tracks), vocals (tracks 1–14, 16), keyboards (tracks 1–6, 8–10, 12–18), bass (tracks 2, 3, 5, 6, 8, 10, 13–14, 18), guitar (tracks 2, 4–5, 7, 8, 10–14, 16–18), drum programming (tracks 2, 10, 16), synthesizer (tracks 4, 7), backing vocals, drums, percussion (track 4), piano (tracks 6, 12), melodica (tracks 16–17)
- Jamie Hewlett – artwork, design
- Remi Kabaka Jr. – production (all tracks), drum programming (tracks 1–2, 5–9, 11–16), percussion (tracks 1, 3–5, 7, 10, 12–13, 15, 17), drums (tracks 3–4, 7)
- Stephen Sedgwick – mixing (all tracks), engineering (tracks 1–4, 6–18)
- John Davis – mastering (tracks 1–12, 14–18)
- Samuel Egglenton – engineering (tracks 1–14, 16–18)
- James Ford – production, drums, percussion (tracks 3, 7, 10), keyboards (tracks 3, 10), guitar (track 3), synthesizer, drum programming (track 7), balafon, zither (track 10)

Additional musicians

- Robert Smith – vocals, guitar, keyboards, bass guitar, music box (track 1)
- Etta Albarn Teulon – trumpet (track 1), additional vocals (track 12)
- Beck – vocals (track 2)
- Rudy Albarn – drums (tracks 2, 18), percussion (track 2)
- Leee John – vocals (track 3)
- Schoolboy Q – vocals (track 4)
- Prince Paul – backing vocals (track 4)
- John Smythe – guitar (track 4)
- Weathrman – bass, keyboards, synthesizer (track 4)
- St. Vincent – vocals, keyboards (track 5)
- Elton John – vocals, piano (track 6)
- 6lack – vocals (track 6)
- Peter Hook – bass (track 7)
- Georgia – drums, percussion (track 7)
- P2J – drum programming (track 7, 12)
- Octavian – vocals (track 8)
- Kano – vocals (track 9)
- Roxani Arias – vocals (track 9)
- Mike Will Made It – drum programming (track 9)
- Fatoumata Diawara – vocals (track 10)
- Voice Messengers^{[c]} – backing vocals (track 10)
- Alice Pratley – violin (track 10)
- Ciara Ismail – violin (tracks 10, 17)
- Davide Rossi – strings, string arranger (track 10)
- Izzi Dunn – cello (tracks 10, 17)
- Nicola Hicks – viola (track 10)
- Sébastien Blanchon – horn (track 10)
- Slowthai – vocals (track 11)
- Slaves – vocals, guitar, drums (track 11)
- Mike Dean – drum programming (track 11)
- EarthGang – vocals (track 12)
- Roberto Fonseca – piano (track 12)
- Joan As Police Woman – vocals, erhu, guitar, keyboards, upright bass (track 13)
- GoldLink – vocals (track 14)
- Unknown Mortal Orchestra – vocals, bells (track 14)
- Moonchild Sanelly – vocals (track 15)
- JPEGMafia – vocals (track 16)
- Chai – vocals, keyboards, drums (track 16)
- Tony Allen – vocals, drums (track 17)
- Skepta – vocals (track 17)
- Kotono Sato – violin (track 17)
- Stella Page – viola (track 17)

Additional technical

- Robert Smith – production (track 1)
- David Greenbaum – engineering (track 2)
- Dylan Herman – engineering (track 2)
- Elvin "Wit" Shahbazian – engineering (track 4)
- Paul Huston – production, engineering (track 4)
- Annie Clark – engineering (track 5)
- Ricardo Valentine Jr. – engineering (track 6)
- Matt Doughty – engineering (track 6)
- Richard Isong – additional production (track 7, 12)
- Michael Williams II – production (track 9)
- Marzeratti – production (track 9)
- Darryle "Rell" Gayle – engineering (track 9)
- Adrien Libmann – engineering (track 10)
- Andrea Fognini – engineering (track 10)
- Davide Lasala – engineering (track 10)
- Sylvain Mercier – engineering (track 10)
- Nora Fedrigo – engineering (track 10)
- Mike Dean – co-production (track 11)
- Raul Chirinos – engineering (track 12)
- Joan Wasser – production (track 13)
- Ruban Nielson – engineering (track 14)
- Osamu Shu Imamoto – engineering (track 16)
- Stuart Lowbridge – track sequencing

Additional artwork

- Stars Redmond – assistance

Notes

- ^{^[c]} "Voice Messengers" consist of Sylvain Bellegarde, Emmanuel Laniece, Augustin Ledieu, Vanina de Franco, and Neima Naouri

== Charts ==
=== Weekly charts ===
Chart (2020)	Peak position
Australian Albums (ARIA)	5
Austrian Albums (Ö3 Austria)	9
Belgian Albums (Ultratop Flanders)	6
Belgian Albums (Ultratop Wallonia)	12
Canadian Albums (Billboard)	18
Croatian International Albums (HDU)	4
Danish Albums (Hitlisten)	12
Dutch Albums (Album Top 100)	6
French Albums (SNEP)	19
German Albums (Offizielle Top 100)	9
Greek Albums (IFPI Greece)	19
Hungarian Albums (MAHASZ)	4
Irish Albums (IRMA)	2
Italian Albums (FIMI)	23
Japanese Albums (Oricon)	65
New Zealand Albums (RMNZ)	5
Polish Albums (ZPAV)	41
Portuguese Albums (AFP)	2
Scottish Albums (Official Charts)	2
Spanish Albums (Promusicae)	24
Swiss Albums (Schweizer Hitparade)	8
UK Albums (Official Charts)	2
US Billboard 200	12
US Top Alternative Albums (Billboard)	2
US Top Rock Albums (Billboard)	3

=== Year-end charts ===
Chart (2020)	Position
US Top Alternative Albums (Billboard)	50
US Top Rock Albums (Billboard)	83

== Certifications ==
Region	Certification	Certified units/sales
United Kingdom (BPI)	Silver	60,000^{‡}
^{‡} Sales+streaming figures based on certification alone.
