= The Child of Lov =

- Also known as: Cole Williams
- Born: Martijn William Zimri Teerlinck; 31 March 1987; Lendelede, Belgium
- Origin: Amsterdam, Netherlands
- Died: 10 December 2013 (aged 26)
- Genres: R&B; funk; psychedelic soul
- Occupations: Poet, musician
- Years active: 2012–2013
- Labels: Domino Records, Double Six Records
- Formerly of: MF Doom, Damon Albarn, Thundercat

Martijn William Zimri Teerlinck (31 March 1987 – 10 December 2013), known as Cole Williams, or The Child of Lov, was a Dutch poet and musician born in Lendelede Belgium, but raised in Amsterdam and Alkmaar, The Netherlands.

== Career ==
The debut single "Heal" was released by Domino Recording Company's sister label Double Six on 26 November 2012. The accompanying video was shot in Atlanta, Georgia by the LA-based duo Focus Creeps (who have previously directed videos for Arctic Monkeys and Girls). His second single "Give Me", was released on 7 January 2013, after a demo leaked online sometime in 2012. Williams' debut album The Child of Lov was released in June 2013 and features contributions from Doom, Thundercat and Damon Albarn.

He suffered from Marfan syndrome and died of complications of surgery on 10 December 2013.

== Discography ==
=== Studio albums ===
- The Child of Lov (2013)

=== EPs ===
- Crying Thunder (2013)
