= The Child of Lov (album) =

Studio album by the Child of Lov
- Released: 6 May 2013
- Genre: R&B; funk; psychedelic soul
- Length: 38:33
- Label: Double Six

The Child of Lov is the only studio album by Belgian artist the Child of Lov. It was released on 6 May 2013 through Double Six.

== Critical reception ==
Upon release the album was met with generally positive reviews from music critics. At Metacritic the album received an average score of 74, based on 12 reviews, indicating "generally favorable reviews".

DIY wrote: "It’s at once timeless, decidedly retro yet oddly futuristic, a true album of contradictions enjoyable on a completely shallow level of catchy songs and memorable riffs but offering depth often lacking in a debut."

The Observer said it was full of "myriad ideas" but had "too much going on."

== Track listing ==
The Child of Lov track listing
No.	Title	Length
1.	"Call Me Up"	3:53
2.	"Heal"	3:23
3.	"One Day" (featuring Damon Albarn)	4:38
4.	"Living the Circle"	3:32
5.	"Give Me"	3:39
6.	"Go with the Wind"	4:34
7.	"Owl" (featuring MF Doom)	3:06
8.	"Fly"	3:58
9.	"Warrior"	4:24
10.	"Give It to the People"	3:26

Sample credits

- "One Day" contains a sample of "Una Stanza Vuota" by Calibro 35.

== Charts ==
Chart performance for The Child of Lov
Chart (2013)	Peak position
Belgian Albums (Ultratop Flanders)	94
Belgian Albums (Ultratop Wallonia)	143
Dutch Albums (Album Top 100)	18
UK Independent Albums (OCC)	47
