= Demon Strings =

British orchestral group

- Origin: England
- Genres: Orchestral; Classical
- Years active: 2005–present
- Members: Isabelle Dunn; Kotono Sato; Stella Page; Antonia Pagulatos; Ciara Ismail; Sarah Tuke
- Past members: Oli Langford; Alice Pratley

Demon Strings are a British stringed instrument group. They are best known for being the in-house string section for musician Damon Albarn, having recorded and performed live for several of his projects including The Good, the Bad & the Queen, Gorillaz, Blur and Monkey: Journey to the West.

== Career ==
Formed in 2005 by cellist Isabelle Dunn (aka. Izzi Dunn) and manager Tee Bowry, Demon Strings is composed of some of the UK's finest string players specializing in live, television and recorded work.

As Damon Albarn's "in-house" string section, Demon Strings worked closely with him on several of his projects. These included the Gorillaz album Demon Days, a run of shows at The Manchester Opera House and the Apollo Theater and several TV performances. Continuing the relationship, 2007 saw Demon Strings tour Europe and the US with Albarn's The Good, the Bad & the Queen. They have also performed the orchestration for Blur's eight studio album The Magic Whip.

Another of Albarn's projects, Monkey: Journey to the West saw the Demon Strings as part of the orchestra for runs at the Royal Opera House, Palace Theatre Manchester, Théâtre du Châtelet and culminated in a three-month run at The O2.

In 2007, Demon Strings performed with Madness on their Christmas tour. The following year, they joined producer Mark Ronson on his world tour promoting his Version album, headlining many festivals including Glastonbury, Big Day Out (Australia) and Coachella (US).

In 2014, Demon Strings, were given an official credit for strings on Albarn's debut solo studio album Everyday Robots and have featured in several live performances from Albarn promoting the album, including The One Show.

As of the release of Everyday Robots, the group has consisted of Stella Page, Isabelle Dunn, Ollie "Oli" Langford, Alice Pratley, Kotono Sato and Antonia Pagulatos. Isabelle, Stella and Antonia all featured on the Demon Days album by Gorillaz prior to the formation of Demon Strings.

== Discography ==
- 2005 – Gorillaz – Demon Days
- 2007 – The Good, the Bad & the Queen – The Good, the Bad & the Queen
- 2008 – Damon Albarn – Journey to the West
- 2010 – Gorillaz – Plastic Beach
- 2014 – Damon Albarn – Everyday Robots
- 2015 – Blur – The Magic Whip
- 2018 – The Good, the Bad & the Queen – Merrie Land
- 2020 – Gorillaz – Song Machine, Season One: Strange Timez
- 2021 – Gorillaz – Meanwhile EP
