= Stephen Sedgwick (engineer) =

British mix engineer

Stephen Sedgwick is a British mix engineer, best known for his work with Damon Albarn and Gorillaz.

== Career ==
Sedgwick began his career in 2002 at Pierce Rooms in London, and met Damon Albarn there while working on the second Gorillaz studio album, Demon Days, in 2004. In 2006, Albarn invited Sedgwick to work at the first incarnation of Studio 13 and in 2010, Sedgwick was appointed head engineer at the current location near Ladbroke Grove.

Sedgwick has recorded and mixed each of Albarn's albums and music projects since 2004. Sedgwick has received multiple Grammy nominations and has worked with artists including Amy Winehouse, Benjamin Clementine, Blur, Bobby Womack, Chaka Khan, De La Soul, Erykah Badu, Lana Del Rey, Lou Reed, Major Lazer, Massive Attack, Mura Masa, Rex Orange County, Snoop Dogg, The Clash and Tony Allen.

== Selected credits ==
Music projects
Year	Artist	Project title	Credit	Format
2005	Gorillaz	Demon Days	Engineer	Album
2010	Gorillaz	Plastic Beach	Programming, recording	Album
2010	Gorillaz	The Fall	Mixing, recording, producer	Album
2010	Martina Topley-Bird	Some Place Simple	Mixing, Recording	Album
2011	Rocket Juice & the Moon	Rocket Juice & the Moon	Recording, engineer	Album
2011	DRC Music	Kinshasa One Two	Engineer, Mixing	Album
2012	Bobby Womack	The Bravest Man in the Universe	Mixing, Recording	Album
2013	The Child of Lov	The Child of Lov	Mixing	Album
2014	Damon Albarn	Everyday Robots	Mixing, Recording	Album
2015	Songhoy Blues	Music in Exile	Mixing	Album
2015	Blur	The Magic Whip	Mixing, Recording	Album
2015	ALA.NI	You and I	Mixing	Album
2017	Gorillaz	Humanz	Mixing, engineer	Album
2017	Benjamin Clementine	I Tell a Fly	Mixing, Recording	Album
2017	Rex Orange County	Best Friend	Mixing	Single
2017	Rat Boy	Scum	Mixing	Album
2018	Gorillaz	The Now Now	Mixing, recording, engineer	Album
2018	Fatoumata Diawara	Fenfo (Something to Say)	Mixing	Album
2018	The Good, The Bad & The Queen	Merrie Land	Mixing, Recording	Album
2019	Africa Express	Egoli (Africa Express album)	Mixing	Album
2020	The Shapeshifters	Finally Ready Feat. Billy Porter	Mixing	Single
2020	Afel Bocoum	Lindé	Mixing	Album
2020	Gorillaz	Song Machine, Season One: Strange Timez	Mixing, engineer	Album
2021	Sad Night Dynamite	Sad Night Dynamite	Mixing	Album
2021	Gorillaz	Meanwhile EP	Mixing	EP
2021	Damon Albarn	The Nearer the Fountain, More Pure the Stream Flows	Mixing	Album
2021	Paul McCartney	Long Tailed Winter Bird (Damon Albarn Remix)	Mixing	Single
2021	The Million	Why We'll Never Be Together	Mixing	EP
2021	Kaktus Einarsson	Kick The Ladder	Mixing	Album
2021	Artemas	I’m Tryna Tell U That I Love U	Mixing	Single
2021	Artemas	Real Life	Mixing	Single
2021	Elton John, Gorillaz, 6LACK	The Pink Phantom	Mixing	Track
2022	The Million	No One's Home	Mixing	Single
2022	The Million	Therapy	Mixing	Single
2022	Bulgarian Cartrader	Motor Songs	Mixing	Album
2022	Cariño	CARIÑO	Mixing	Album
2022	The Away Days	Seninle Sonbahar	Mixing	Single
2022	Sad Night Dynamite	Volume II	Mixing	Album
2022	Tshegue	Mais	Mixing	Single
2022	Franc Moody	Into The Ether	Mixing	Album
2022	Reverend and the Makers	Heatwave In The Cold North	Mixing	Album
2023	Emily Saunders	Rugged Waves	Mixing	Single
2023	Cassyette	BOOM	Mixing	Single
2023	Atka	Eye In The Sky	Mixing	Single
2023	Atka	Lenny	Mixing	Single
2023	Atka	Desiring Machines	Mixing	Single
2023	WALKER.	TOMMY	Mixing	Single
2023	Gorillaz	Tormenta feat. Bad Bunny	Mixing	Single
2023	breathe.	One More Try	Mixing	Single
2023	breathe.	All Figured Out	Mixing	Single
2023	breathe.	Cathedral	Mixing	Single
2023	Fatoumata Diawara	London Ko	Mixing	Album
2024	Coruja Blu	Sugar Rush	Mixing	Single
2024	Cassyette	Friends in low places	Mixing	Single
2024	Cassyette	Four Leaf Clover	Mixing	Single
2024	Cassyette	Over It	Mixing	Single
2024	Cassyette	When She Told Me	Mixing	Single
2024	Cassyette	Ipecac	Mixing	Single
2024	Bulgarian Cartrader	Soul is the Price	Mixing	EP
2024	Yuneki	Like Honey	Mixing	Single

Soundtracks
Title	Director	Year
Monkey: Journey To The West	Chen Shi-Zheng	2008
Dr Dee	Rufus Norris	2012
Broken	Rufus Norris	2012
Lucy	Luc Besson	2014
Paddington	Paul King	2014
Wonder.land	Rufus Norris	2016
Jawbone	Thomas Q. Napper	2017
Paddington 2	Paul King	2017
