= Remi Kabaka Jr. =

British music producer, art director, and percussionist

- Born: 11 April 1970 (age 56)
- Occupations: Record producer; art director; percussionist
- Years active: 1998–present
- Notable work: Gorillaz
- Parents: Remi Kabaka (father); Bala Malan-Kabaka (mother)

Remi Kabaka Jr. (born 11 April 1970) is a British record producer, art director, and percussionist best known as the drummer and producer for British virtual band Gorillaz. He became a music producer for the band in 2015 after several years of providing the voice of Russel Hobbs and was listed as an A&R producer alongside Damon Albarn and Jamie Hewlett in the 2019 documentary Gorillaz: Reject False Icons. In 2007, Kabaka created the audiovisual collective Gorillaz Sound System.

== Career ==
Along with his work with Gorillaz, Kabaka has collaborated further with the band's frontman Damon Albarn and artist Jamie Hewlett on other projects including DRC, Africa Express and Bobby Womack's album The Bravest Man in the Universe.

Kabaka is also a manager of Steve Lazarides's London art gallery, which regularly exhibits work by the artist Banksy.
