= Phase Two: Slowboat to Hades =

2006 video album by Gorillaz

Video by Gorillaz
- Released: 30 October 2006
- Recorded: Kong Studios & 13
- Length: 163 min
- Label: Parlophone
- Producer: Gorillaz

Gorillaz chronology
Demon Days Live (2006)	Phase Two: Slowboat to Hades (2006)	Bananaz (2008)

Phase Two: Slowboat to Hades is a compilation DVD by Gorillaz, released in October 2006. The DVD is similar to the band's first DVD, Phase One: Celebrity Take Down, but compiles the videos and animatics related to the release of the band's second album, Demon Days, as well as the related singles.

The DVD includes most of the materials released by Gorillaz from 2004 to 2006, which includes the full videos for "Rock It", "Feel Good Inc.", "Dare", "Dirty Harry" and "El Mañana". It includes the MTV EMAs, and Brits live performances. Also included is the Gorillaz' MTV Cribs episode, the Phase Two Gorillaz bites, a new Kong Studios guide, a gallery, and short interviews. Plus, it features a few hidden extras found in certain rooms. The DVD is bundled with a CD-ROM featuring games and wallpapers. Strangely, on the DVD, Kong Studios appears to be in a bad state, with holes in walls, floors, and blood splatterings, along with litter. Unlike the previous Phase One: Celebrity Take Down, there is a floor directory, due to the fact there are more items on this DVD. In Rise of the Ogre, the aftermath states that now Noodle has left, the spiritual peace and happiness left with her, causing the building to begin finally giving in to the dark forces which have been plaguing it, due to Murdoc stating he was bigger than Satan, a parody of what the Beatles reportedly said during their fame. The DVD also includes the event of Murdoc's rebirth which happened 6/6/06 on the Gorillaz official website as a hidden feature. The Phase Two Kong Studios contains less animated backgrounds, this time being completely computerized. The website took on this new view when it was reopened, though it was less damaged.

== DVD listing ==
1. "Feel Good Inc." Video
2. "Dare" Video
3. "Dirty Harry" Video
4. "El Mañana" Video
5. Feel Good Inc. Animatic
6. Dare Animatic
7. Dirty Harry Animatic
8. El Mañana Animatic
9. The Swagga
10. Bill Murray
11. Spitting Out the Demons
12. "Kids with Guns"
13. People
14. Samba at 13
15. Murdoc Is God
16. Demon Days Album Ad
17. Demon Days Live DVD Ad
18. Demon Days Live Manchester Mash Up
19. Dare Ringtone Ad
20. GES mobile games trailer
21. Celebrity Take Down DVD trailer
22. MTV Europe Music Awards performance
23. Feel Up live performance
24. BRIT Awards 2006 performance
25. El Mañana Live in Harlem
26. BRIT Awards rehearsals
27. Gorillaz Live in Harlem Sting
28. Hip Hop Machine Ident
29. Mexican Jailer Ident
30. Fairground Ident
31. Capsule Hotel Ident
32. On the Island (G-Bite)
33. The Lost G-Bite
34. Noodle VMA acceptance speech
35. Murdoc Alternative Queen's Speech
36. Murdoc Record Company Thank You
37. Noodle's Dance Moves
38. MTV Cribs
39. Monk's Montage
40. Polar Bear Gags
41. End Credits
42. Hidden Extras

== Hidden extras ==
1. Murdoc's Alternative Queen's Speech (Outtakes)
2. New York Live Puppet Intro
3. We Are Happy Landfill
4. Kong Studios Tour 2.0
5. 2-D and Murdoc in New York
6. Feel Good Inc. (Audio Commentary)
7. Murdoc 6.6.6 Animation

== CD-ROM features ==
- 16 full-screen games from Gorillaz' website: Russel's Animal Kwackers, Bowling, Russel's Cookie Eating, Darts, Dirty Harry, Helly-Drop, Identikit, Operation, Potato, Santa Sleigher, Pumpomatic, Shooting Range, Mahjong, Murdoc's Attache, Tiles of the Unexpected and Bonesy Apple Bobbing.
- 8 screensavers
- 45 wallpapers

Plus hidden and achievement-based extras.

== Notes ==
- Although Samba at 13 has a clip in this DVD, it is not in the track listing of the normal version of the album D-Sides, it is only available on the Japanese version, and as a standalone single on the iTunes Store.

== Release details ==
The DVD was released in various countries in October and November 2006.

Country	Date	Label	Format	Catalog
Japan	25 October 2006	Toshiba-EMI	DVD/CD-ROM	TOBW3307
United Kingdom	30 October 2006	Parlophone	DVD/CD-ROM	3744629 / 0946 3 74462 9 4
United States	31 October 2006	Parlophone, Virgin Records	DVD/CD-ROM	0946 3 75665 9 6
Australia	11 November 2006	EMI, Capitol Records	DVD/CD-ROM	0946 3 75874 9 2

== Charts ==
Chart (2006)	Peak position
UK Music Videos (OCC)	4

== Certifications ==
Region	Certification	Certified units/sales
France (SNEP)	Gold	10,000^{*}
^{*} Sales figures based on certification alone.
