= Demon Days Live (film) =

2006 video album by Gorillaz

Demon Days: Live at the Manchester Opera House

Video by Gorillaz
- Released: 27 March 2006
- Recorded: 1–5 November 2005
- Venue: Manchester Opera House
- Genres: Alternative rock; art rock; electronic; hip hop; pop
- Length: 69:50
- Label: Parlophone
- Producer: Gorillaz

Gorillaz chronology
Phase One: Celebrity Take Down (2002)	Demon Days: Live at the Manchester Opera House (2006)	Phase Two: Slowboat to Hades (2006)

Professional ratings
Review scores
Source	Rating
Rolling Stone	3.5/5 stars

Demon Days: Live at the Manchester Opera House is a live DVD by Gorillaz, released 27 March 2006 in the UK (see 2006 in British music). It compiles the live performances from 1 to 5 November 2005 at the Manchester Opera House that recreated the Demon Days studio album and was directed by David Barnard and Grant Gee.

Nearly all of the album's performers were available to participate in the event, including Neneh Cherry, Bootie Brown, Shaun Ryder and Ike Turner. MF Doom and Dennis Hopper appeared through video and audio narration, respectively. Local Manchester choirs were hired for the performances.

Included as an encore are "Hong Kong", a song written for the War Child album Help!: A Day in the Life, and "Latin Simone (¿Qué Pasa Contigo?)" from the Gorillaz album, as a tribute to the memory of Ibrahim Ferrer, who died before the event took place. Also included are the visuals seen on the large screen for all but three of the performances, as those songs featured single cover art for the duration of each respective song. The visuals for "Kids with Guns" are the contribution by the "Search for a Star" video winner "Carlos".

During the performance, 2-D and Murdoc appeared (as puppets) in a box and were motioning for the encore toward the end.

The live performances in Manchester were a pre-festival commission for the Manchester International Festival, which took place in 2007. The DVD peaked at number 3 on the UK DVD charts.

The film was nominated for a Grammy Award for Best Music Film.

In 2011, an audio-only version of the show was released on Spotify.

== Track listing ==
1. "Intro" – 1:11
2. "Last Living Souls" – 3:21
3. "Kids with Guns" (featuring Neneh Cherry) – 4:04
4. "O Green World" – 5:17
5. "Dirty Harry" (featuring Bootie Brown) – 4:00
6. "Feel Good Inc." (featuring De La Soul) – 3:56
7. "El Mañana" – 4:07
8. "Every Planet We Reach Is Dead" (featuring Ike Turner) – 5:30
9. "November Has Come" (featuring Doom) (footage) – 2:58
10. "All Alone" (featuring Roots Manuva and Martina Topley-Bird) – 3:52
11. "White Light" – 2:26
12. "Dare" (featuring Roses Gabor and Shaun Ryder) – 4:38
13. "Fire Coming Out of the Monkey's Head" – Read by Dennis Hopper – 3:32
14. "Don't Get Lost in Heaven" (featuring The London Community Gospel Choir) – 2:07
15. "Demon Days" (featuring The London Community Gospel Choir) – 4:52
16. "Hong Kong" (featuring Zeng Zhen) – 6:37
17. "Latin Simone (¿Qué Pasa Contigo?)" (featuring Ibrahim Ferrer) (footage) – 3:53

== Personnel ==
- Vocals/piano/melodica – Damon Albarn
- MD/keyboards – Mike Smith
- Guitar – Simon Tong
- Guitar – Simon Jones
- Bass – Morgan Nicholls
- Drums – Cass Browne
- Percussion - Karl Vanden Bossche
- Turntable – Darren Galea

=== Backing vocalists ===
- Wayne Hernandez
- Sharlene Hector
- Rosie Wilson
- Wendi Rose
- Aaron Sokell

=== String section ===
- Cello – Isabelle Dunn
- Cello – Dan Keane
- Bass – Emma Smith
- Viola – Amanda Drummond
- Viola – Nina Kapinsky
- Violin – Antonia Pagulatos
- Violin – Jennifer Berman
- Violin – Kirsty Mangan
- Viola – Gary Pomeroy
- Cello – Deborah Chandler

=== Guests ===
- Neneh Cherry – Guest vocals on "Kids with Guns"
- Bootie Brown – Guest rap on "Dirty Harry"
- De La Soul – Guest raps on "Feel Good Inc"
- Ike Turner – Guest piano on "Every Planet We Reach is Dead"
- MF Doom – Guest rap on "November Has Come"
- Roots Manuva – Guest rap on "All Alone"
- Martina Topley-Bird – Guest vocals on "All Alone"
- Rosie Wilson – Guest vocals on "Dare"
- Shaun Ryder – Guest vocals on "Dare"
- Dennis Hopper – Spoken word vocals on "Fire Coming Out of the Monkey's Head"
- The London Community Gospel Choir – Guest vocals on "Don't Get Lost in Heaven" and "Demon Days"
- Zeng Zhen – Guest guzheng on "Hong Kong"
- Ibrahim Ferrer – Guest vocals on "Latin Simone (¿Qué Pasa Contigo?)"

== Charts ==
Chart (2006)	Peak position
Australian Music DVD (ARIA)	5
Austrian Music DVD (Ö3 Austria)	7
Belgian Music DVD (Ultratop Flanders)	10
Danish Music DVD (Hitlisten)	3
Greek Music DVD (IFPI)	4
Italian Music DVD (FIMI)	12
Japanese Music DVD (Oricon)	143
New Zealand Music DVD (RMNZ)	2
Portuguese Music DVD (AFP)	3
UK Music Videos (Official Charts)	3
US Music Videos (Billboard)	11

== Certifications ==
Region	Certification	Certified units/sales
Australia (ARIA)	Gold	7,500^{^}
United Kingdom (BPI)	Gold	25,000^{^}
^{^} Shipments figures based on certification alone.

== Release history ==
The DVD was released in various countries.

Country	Date	Label	Format	Catalog
United Kingdom	27 March 2006	Parlophone	DVD	0946 3 59355 9 2
Australia	27 March 2006	Capitol	DVD	356 2449
Australia	27 March 2006	Capitol	DVD: Deluxe Edition	359 3559
Canada	28 March 2006	Parlophone	DVD	0946 3 59354 9 3
Japan	29 March 2006	Toshiba-EMI	DVD	TOBW3294
United States	4 April 2006	Parlophone, Virgin	DVD	0946 3 56243 9 7
