= Danger Mouse discography =

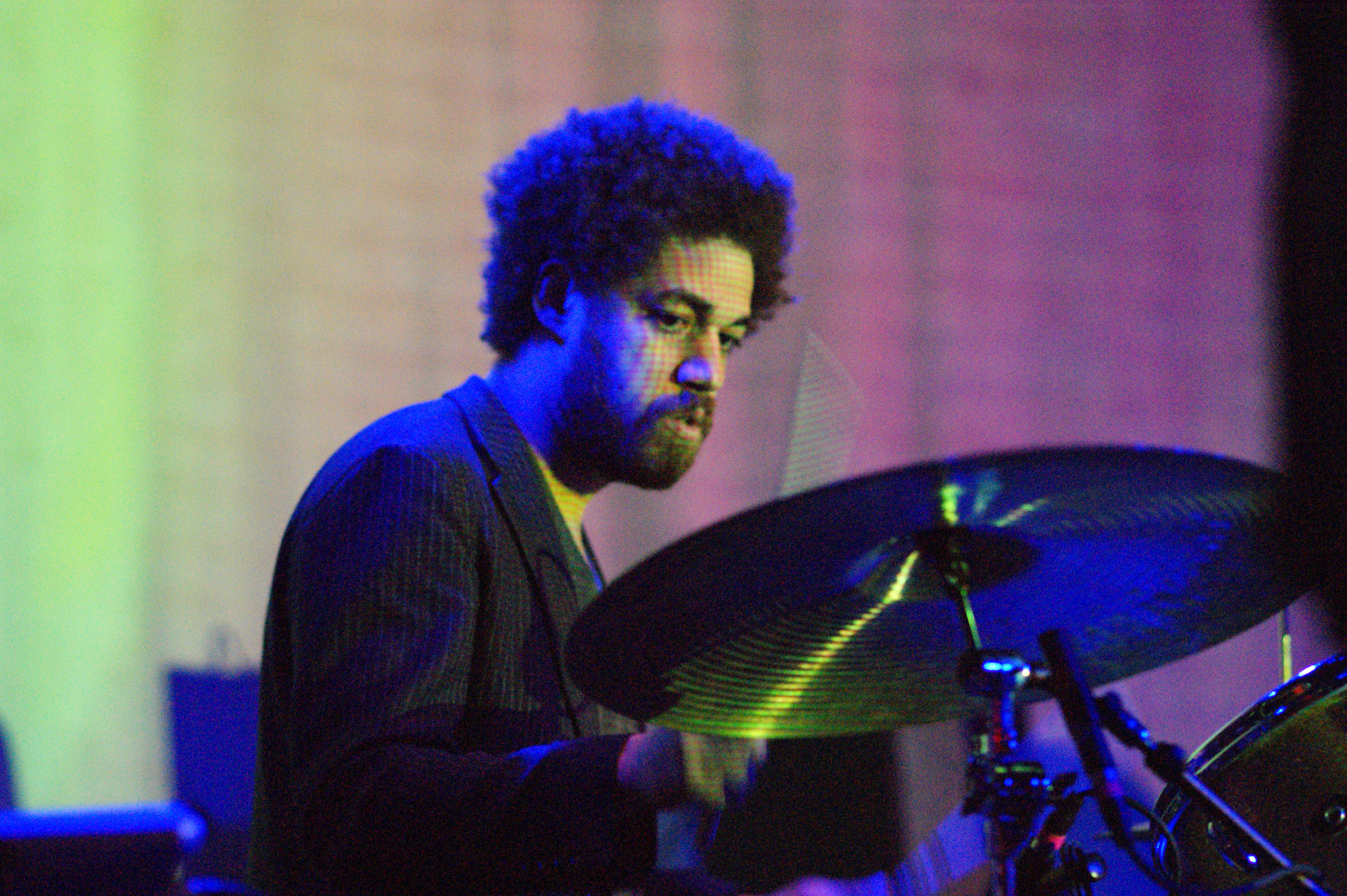
- Danger Mouse performing with Broken Bells in 2010
- Studio albums: 18
- Singles: 3

The discography of American musician, songwriter, and record producer Danger Mouse (Brian Burton) consists of studio albums released as a solo artist, member of a group, and extensive production credits for other artists. Burton first rose to prominence in 2004 with the release of The Grey Album, a critically acclaimed mashup record that combined vocal tracks from Jay-Z’s The Black Album with instrumentals from the Beatles' White Album. Despite legal controversies regarding copyright, the project went viral, establishing Burton as a significant figure in the remix and sampling culture and launching his career as a highly sought-after producer.

Following his solo breakthrough, Burton co-founded several successful musical duos. Most notably, he formed Gnarls Barkley with singer CeeLo Green, achieving international commercial success with their debut album St. Elsewhere (2006) and the Grammy-winning single "Crazy." He also formed the indie rock band Broken Bells with James Mercer of The Shins, releasing a self-titled debut in 2010. Burton's collaborative nature has led to project-specific partnerships with a wide range of artists, including the hip-hop collaboration Danger Doom with MF Doom, Rome with Italian composer Daniele Luppi, and Lux Prima with Karen O of the Yeah Yeah Yeahs.

Beyond his own groups, Danger Mouse has built a prolific catalog as a producer for A-list artists across multiple genres. He is credited with producing Gorillaz's multi-platinum album Demon Days (2005), as well as significant works for The Black Keys (Attack & Release, El Camino, Turn Blue), Beck (Modern Guilt), and Portugal. The Man (Woodstock). His production portfolio also includes albums for U2, Red Hot Chili Peppers, Norah Jones, and A$AP Rocky. Burton has won multiple Grammy Awards, including the award for Producer of the Year, Non-Classical, in 2011, recognizing his distinctive, cinematic, and often retro-inspired production style.

== Studio albums ==
List of albums where Danger Mouse was a primary artist or key contributor
Artist	Title	Release date	Additional details
Pelican City	The Chilling Effect Original Motion Picture Score	1999	LP
Pelican City	Rhode Island	2000	LP
Pelican City	Pelican City vs. Scanner	2002	EP
Danger Mouse and Jemini	Ghetto Pop Life	2003	LP
Danger Mouse	The Grey Album	2004	LP
Danger Doom	The Mouse & The Mask	2005	LP
Danger Doom	Occult Hymn	2005	EP
Gnarls Barkley	St. Elsewhere	2006	LP
Gnarls Barkley	The Odd Couple	2008	LP
Joker's Daughter	The Last Laugh	2009	LP
Danger Mouse and Sparklehorse	Dark Night of the Soul	2010	LP
Broken Bells	Broken Bells	2010	LP
Broken Bells	Meyrin Fields	2011	EP
Danger Mouse and Daniele Luppi	Rome	2011	LP
Broken Bells	After the Disco	2014	LP
Karen O and Danger Mouse	Lux Prima	2019	LP
Danger Mouse and Black Thought	Cheat Codes	2022	LP
Broken Bells	Into the Blue	2022	LP
Danger Mouse and Jemini	Born Again	2023	LP
Gnarls Barkley	Atlanta	2026	LP

== Solo singles ==
List of singles where Danger Mouse was a primary artist or key contributor
Year	Single	Peak chart			Album
Year	Single	Hot 100	US Alt.	US Rock	Album
2006	"Crazy" (Gnarls Barkley)	2	7	—	St. Elsewhere
2006	"Gone Daddy Gone" (Gnarls Barkley)	—	26	—	St. Elsewhere
2008	"Going On" (Gnarls Barkley)	88	—	—	The Odd Couple
2008	"Run" (Gnarls Barkley)	—	35	—	The Odd Couple
2010	"The High Road" (Broken Bells)	—	10	15	Broken Bells
2010	"The Ghost Inside" (Broken Bells)	—	22	42	Broken Bells
2011	"Two Against One" (w/Daniele Luppi featuring Jack White)	—	20	33	Rome
2011	"Black" (w/Daniele Luppi featuring Norah Jones)	—	—	—	Rome
2014	"Holding On For Life" (Broken Bells)	—	16	22	After The Disco
2014	"After The Disco" (Broken Bells)	—	—	34	After The Disco
2017	"Chase Me" (featuring Run the Jewels and Big Boi)	—	—	—	Baby Driver (Music from the Motion Picture)

== Produced albums ==
List of albums Danger Mouse produced in whole or in part
Artist	Title	Release date
Prince Po	The Slickness	2004
Gorillaz	Demon Days	2005
Busdriver	Fear of a Black Tangent	2005
Tha Alkaholiks	Firewater	2006
The Rapture	Pieces of the People We Love	2006
Sparklehorse	Dreamt for Light Years in the Belly of a Mountain	2006
The Good, the Bad & the Queen	The Good, the Bad & the Queen	2007
Gorillaz	D-Sides	2007
The Black Keys	Attack & Release	2008
The Shortwave Set	Replica Sun Machine	2008
Martina Topley-Bird	The Blue God	2008
Beck	Modern Guilt	2008
The Black Keys	Brothers	2010
The Black Keys	El Camino	2011
Electric Guest	Mondo	2012
Norah Jones	Little Broken Hearts	2012
Portugal. The Man	Evil Friends	2013
The Black Keys	Turn Blue	2014
U2	Songs of Innocence	2014
ASAP Rocky	At.Long.Last.ASAP	2015
Raury	All We Need	2015
Adele	25	2015
Michael Kiwanuka	Love & Hate	2016
Red Hot Chili Peppers	The Getaway	2016
Various Artists	Resistance Radio: The Man in the High Castle Album	2017
Portugal. The Man	Woodstock	2017
Parquet Courts	Wide Awake!	2018
Sam Cohen	The Future's Still Ringing in my Ears	2019
Michael Kiwanuka	Kiwanuka	2019
MGMT	Loss of Life	2024
Michael Kiwanuka	Small Changes	2024

== Produced singles ==
List of singles Danger Mouse produced in whole or in part
Artist	Track name	Release date	Album title
Gorillaz	"Feel Good Inc."	2005	Demon Days
Gorillaz	"Dare"	2005	Demon Days
Gorillaz	"Dirty Harry"	2005	Demon Days
Dinah Washington	"Baby, Did You Hear? Danger Mouse Remix"	2005	Verve Remixed 3
Gorillaz	"El Mañana"	2006	Demon Days
Gorillaz	"Kids with Guns"	2006	Demon Days
The Rapture	"Get Myself Into It"	2006	Pieces of the People We Love
The Good, the Bad & the Queen	"Herculean"	2006	The Good, the Bad & the Queen
The Good, the Bad & the Queen	"Kingdom of Doom"	2007	The Good, the Bad & the Queen
The Good, the Bad & the Queen	"Green Fields"	2007	The Good, the Bad & the Queen
The Black Keys	"Strange Times"	2008	Attack & Release
The Black Keys	"I Got Mine"	2008	Attack & Release
Beck	"Chemtrails"	2008	Modern Guilt
Beck	"Gamma Ray"	2008	Modern Guilt
The Black Keys	"Oceans & Streams"	2008	Attack & Release
The Black Keys	"Same Old Thing"	2008	Attack & Release
Beck	"Youthless"	2008	Modern Guilt
Kid Cudi	"Save My Soul (The CuDi Confession)"	2008	A Kid Named Cudi
The Black Keys	"Tighten Up"	2010	Brothers
John Cale	"I Wanna Talk 2 U"	2012	Shifty Adventures in Nookie Wood
ASAP Rocky	"Phoenix"	2013	Long. Live. ASAP
Adele	"River Lea"	2015	25
Iggy Pop	"Gold"	2016	Gold
Red Hot Chili Peppers	"Dark Necessities"	2016	The Getaway
A$AP Rocky	"Sundress"	2018	Sundress

== Promos ==
- Danger Mouse Promo: Volume 1 (1998)
- Danger Mouse Promo: Volume 2 (1999)
- Danger Mouse Promo: Volume 3 (2000)
- Danger Mouse Promo: Volume 4 (2000)
- Danger Mouse Promo: Remix EP 12" White (2001)
- Danger Mouse Promo: Remix EP 12" Red (2002)
- Danger Mouse Promo: Remix EP 12" Yellow (2003)

== Contributions ==
- Toonami Blackhole Megamix (2003) – As Pelican City
- Toonami Supernova Megamix (2012) – As Pelican City
- Remix of To a Black Boy by The Free Design on The Now Sound Redesigned (2005) – Danger Mouse and Murs remix
