= List of awards and nominations received by Gorillaz =

Gorillaz awards and nominations
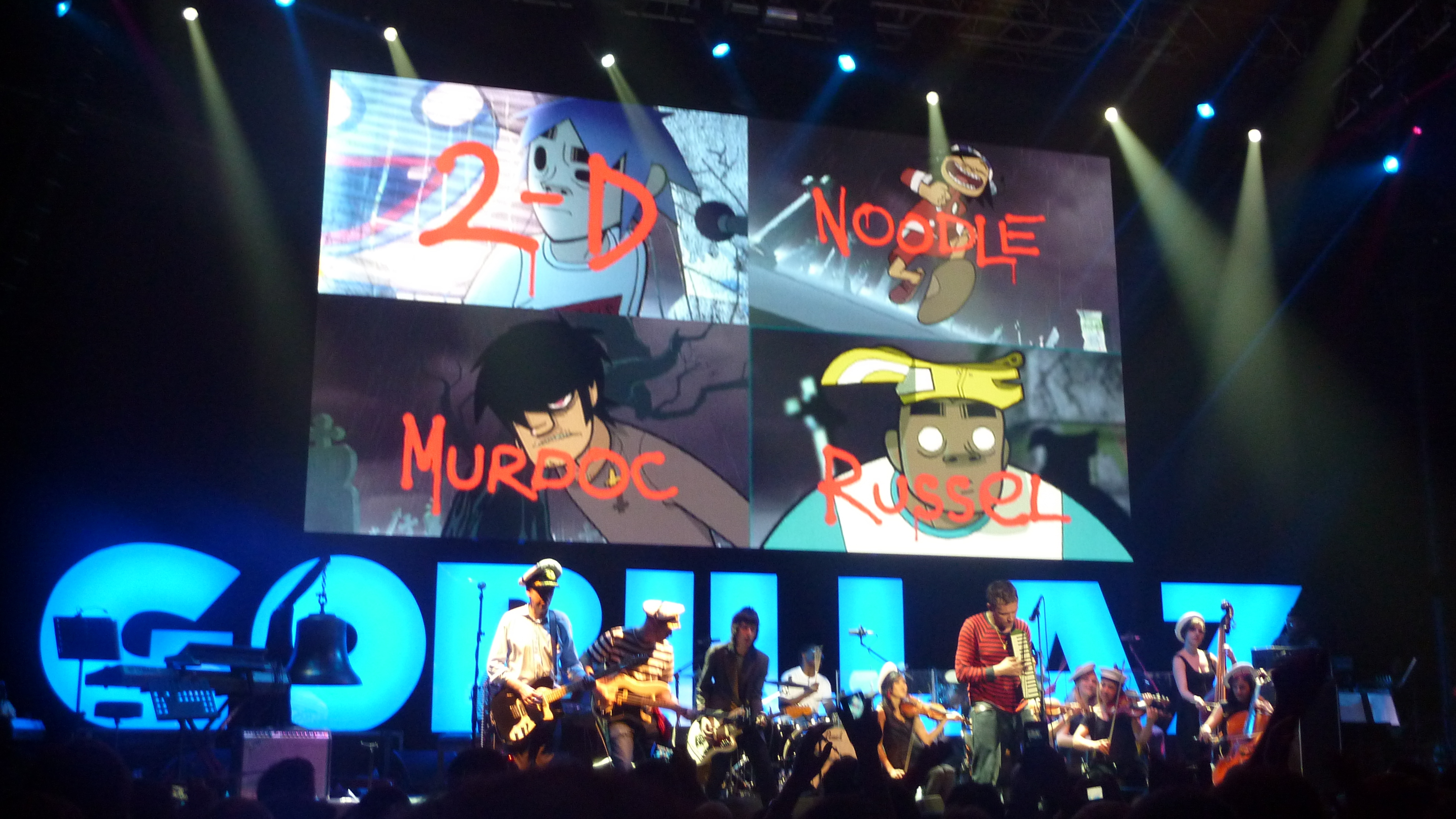
- Gorillaz performing in 2010
Awards and nominations
| Award | Wins | Nominations |
| Brit | 1 | 11 |
| Grammy | 1 | 13 |
| MTV Europe | 4 | 15 |
| MTV VMA | 2 | 6 |
| NME | 1 | 5 |
| Q | 4 | 7 |
| Emmy Awards | 0 | 1 |
| GQ Awards | 1 | 1 |

Totals (Note: Certain award groups do not simply award one winner. They acknowledge several different recipients, have runners-up, and have third place. Since this is a specific recognition and is different from losing an award, runner-up mentions are considered wins in this award tally. For simplification and to avoid errors, each award in this list has been presumed to have had a prior nomination.)
- Wins: 27
- Nominations: 83

Gorillaz are a British virtual band created in 1998 by Damon Albarn of rock band Blur, and Jamie Hewlett, co-creator of the comic book Tank Girl. While watching MTV, Hewlett came up with the idea to create the band, and later commented, "If you watch MTV for too long, it's a bit like hell – there's nothing of substance there. So we got this idea for a cartoon band, something that would be a comment on that." Gorillaz is a virtual band consisting of four cartoon characters: 2D, Murdoc, Noodle, and Russel. They are used in promotional material such as album covers, posters, and in concerts, during which holographic versions of the characters are used. The band's music is usually a collaboration between various musicians; Albarn is the only permanent musical contributor. Gorillaz have released eight studio albums, all on the Parlophone and Virgin record labels: Gorillaz (2001), Demon Days (2005), Plastic Beach (2010), The Fall (digital in 2010, physical in 2011), Humanz (2017), The Now Now (2018), Song Machine, Season One: Strange Timez (2020), and Cracker Island (2023).

Gorillaz have received eleven BRIT Award nominations: six in 2002, two in 2006, one in 2011, one in 2018 and one in 2019. In 2006, Gorillaz received their only Grammy Award, the Best Pop Collaboration with Vocals award for the song "Feel Good Inc." The band has received fifteen nominations from the MTV Europe Music Awards, winning four of them: Best Dance Act and Best Song for "Clint Eastwood" in 2001, and Best Group in 2005. At the MTV Video Music Awards, Gorillaz received both the Best Special Effects and Breakthrough Video awards for "Feel Good Inc." in 2005. In 2023, at the 75th Primetime Emmy Awards, Gorillaz received a nomination in the category of Outstanding Emerging Media Program for Song Machine, a series of music videos made to accompany their seventh studio album, Song Machine, Season One: Strange Timez. Overall, Gorillaz have received 27 awards from 81 nominations.

== Mercury Prize Award ==
The Mercury Prize are the annual awards by the British Phonographic Industry and British Association of Record Dealers. In 2001, their debut album, Gorillaz, was nominated for a Mercury Prize, but it was later withdrawn at the band's request. Murdoc Niccals, the virtual bassist of the band, described the nomination as, "It's like carrying a dead albatross round your neck for eternity". This is the only time that Gorillaz has ever withdrawn for an award nomination.

== BMI London Awards ==
| Year | Nominee / work | Award | Result | Ref. |
|---|---|---|---|---|
| 2002 | "Clint Eastwood" | Pop Award | Won | |
| 2002 | "Clint Eastwood" | College Award | Won | |
| 2003 | "19-2000" | College Award | Won | |
| 2006 | "Feel Good Inc." | College Award | Won | |
| 2006 | "Feel Good Inc." | Pop Award | Won | |
| 2007 | "Dare" | Dance Award | Won | |
| 2007 | "Dare" | Pop Award | Won | |

== Billboard Video Music Awards ==
| Year | Nominee / work | Award | Result |
|---|---|---|---|
| 2001 | "Clint Eastwood" | Maximum Vision Award | Won |
| 2001 | "Clint Eastwood" | Best Modern Rock New Artist Clip | Won |
| 2001 | "Clint Eastwood" | Best Rap/Hip-Hop New Artist Clip | Won |
| 2001 | Jamie Hewlett/Pete Candeland | Director of the Year (for "Clint Eastwood") | Nominated |

== Brit Awards ==
The Brit Awards are the British Phonographic Industry's annual pop music awards. Gorillaz have received one award from ten nominations.

| Year | Nominee / work | Award | Result |
|---|---|---|---|
| 2002 | Gorillaz | British Group | Nominated |
| 2002 | Gorillaz | British Dance Act | Nominated |
| 2002 | Gorillaz | British Breakthrough Act | Nominated |
| 2002 | "Clint Eastwood" | British Single of the Year | Nominated |
| 2002 | "Clint Eastwood" | British Video of the Year | Nominated |
| 2002 | Gorillaz | British Album of the Year | Nominated |
| 2006 | Demon Days | British Album of the Year | Nominated |
| 2006 | Gorillaz | British Group | Nominated |
| 2011 | Gorillaz | British Group | Nominated |
| 2018 | Gorillaz | British Group | Won |
| 2019 | Gorillaz | British Group | Nominated |

== GAFFA Awards ==
=== Denmark GAFFA Awards ===
Delivered since 1991, the GAFFA Awards are a Danish award that rewards popular music by the magazine of the same name.

| Year | Nominee / work | Award | Result | Ref. |
|---|---|---|---|---|
| 2001 | Gorillaz | Best Foreign New Act | Nominated | |
| 2010 | "Stylo" | Best Foreign Video | Won | |
| 2019 | Gorillaz | Best Foreign Band | Nominated | |

=== Sweden GAFFA Awards ===
Delivered since 2010, the GAFFA Awards (Swedish: GAFFA Priset) are a Swedish award that rewards popular music awarded by the magazine of the same name.

| Year | Nominee / work | Award | Result | Ref. |
|---|---|---|---|---|
| 2018 | Gorillaz | Best Foreign Band | Nominated | |

== Grammy Awards ==
The Grammy Awards are awarded annually by the National Academy of Recording Arts and Sciences of the United States. Gorillaz have received one award from thirteen nominations.

| Year | Nominee / work | Award | Result |
|---|---|---|---|
| 2002 | "Clint Eastwood" | Best Rap Performance by a Duo or Group | Nominated |
| 2004 | Phase One: Celebrity Take Down | Best Music Video, Long Form | Nominated |
| 2006 | "Feel Good Inc." (with De La Soul) | Best Pop Collaboration with Vocals | Won |
| 2006 | "Feel Good Inc." (with De La Soul) | Record of the Year | Nominated |
| 2006 | "Feel Good Inc." (with De La Soul) | Best Music Video, Short Form | Nominated |
| 2006 | "Dirty Harry" | Best Urban/Alternative Performance | Nominated |
| 2007 | Demon Days Live | Best Music Video, Long Form | Nominated |
| 2011 | "Orchestral Intro" | Best Pop Instrumental Performance | Nominated |
| 2011 | "Stylo" (with Mos Def & Bobby Womack) | Best Music Video, Short Form | Nominated |
| 2018 | Humanz | Best Alternative Music Album | Nominated |
| 2018 | "Andromeda" | Best Dance Recording | Nominated |
| 2024 | Cracker Island | Best Alternative Music Album | Nominated |
| 2027 | The Mountain | Best Alternative Music Album | Pending |

== GQ Awards ==
The GQ Awards is an annual awards ceremony founded by the men's magazine GQ. Gorillaz have received one award from one nomination.

| Year | Nominee / work | Award | Result |
|---|---|---|---|
| 2010 | Gorillaz | Band of the Year | Won |

== MTV Europe Music Awards ==
The MTV Europe Music Awards is an annual awards ceremony established in 1994 by MTV Europe. Gorillaz have received four awards from fifteen nominations.

| Year | Nominee / work | Award | Result |
|---|---|---|---|
| 2001 | Gorillaz | Best Group | Nominated |
| 2001 | Gorillaz | Best New Act | Nominated |
| 2001 | Gorillaz | Best Dance | Won |
| 2001 | Gorillaz | Web Award | Nominated |
| 2001 | Gorillaz | Best UK and Ireland Act | Nominated |
| 2001 | "Clint Eastwood" | Best Song | Won |
| 2001 | "Clint Eastwood" | Best Video | Nominated |
| 2005 | Gorillaz | Best Group | Won |
| 2005 | Gorillaz | Best Pop | Nominated |
| 2005 | Gorillaz | Best UK and Ireland Act | Nominated |
| 2005 | "Feel Good Inc." | Best Song | Nominated |
| 2005 | "Feel Good Inc." | Best Video | Nominated |
| 2010 | Gorillaz | Best Alternative | Nominated |
| 2010 | Gorillaz | Best World Stage Performance | Nominated |
| 2022 | Gorillaz | Best Alternative | Won |

== MTV Video Music Awards ==
The MTV Video Music Awards is an annual awards ceremony established in 1984 by MTV. Gorillaz have received two awards from six nominations.

| Year | Nominee / work | Award | Result |
|---|---|---|---|
| 2001 | "Clint Eastwood" | Breakthrough Video | Nominated |
| 2001 | "Clint Eastwood" | Best Art Direction | Nominated |
| 2001 | "Clint Eastwood" | MTV2 Award | Nominated |
| 2005 | "Feel Good Inc." | Best Special Effects | Won |
| 2005 | "Feel Good Inc." | Breakthrough Video | Won |
| 2010 | "Stylo" | Breakthrough Video | Nominated |

== NME Awards ==
The NME Awards is an annual awards ceremony founded by the music magazine NME. Gorillaz have received one award from five nominations.

| Year | Nominee / work | Award | Result |
|---|---|---|---|
| 2006 | Gorillaz | John Peel Award for Innovation | Won |
| 2006 | "Dare" | Best Video | Nominated |
| 2011 | "Stylo" | Best Track | Nominated |
| 2011 | "Stylo" | Best Video | Nominated |
| 2011 | "Plastic Beach" | Best Album Artwork | Nominated |

== Popjustice Twenty Quid Music Prize ==
The Popjustice £20 Music Prize, also known as the Popjustice Twenty Quid Prize, is an annual prize awarded by music website Popjustice to recognise the best British pop single of the previous year. The prize was conceived by Popjustice founder Peter Robinson in 2003 as a reaction to what he perceived as the pompous and elitist nature of the existing Mercury Prize, which recognises the best album of the previous year, and in particular its exclusion of pop music acts in favour of those from more esoteric genres. The shortlist for the Popjustice prize is announced in September of each year and the winner named the following month, to coincide with the presentation of the Mercury Prize. Popjustice gives a token prize of £20 to the winner of its award, in contrast to the £20,000 given to the winner of the Mercury Prize.

| Year | Nominee / work | Award | Result |
|---|---|---|---|
| 2006 | "Dare" | Best British Pop Single | Nominated |

== Q Awards ==
The Q Awards is an annual awards ceremony founded by the music magazine Q. Gorillaz have received four awards from seven nominations.

| Year | Nominee / work | Award | Result |
|---|---|---|---|
| 2001 | "Clint Eastwood" | Best Video | Won |
| 2001 | Gorillaz | Best Producer (Dan Nakamura) | Nominated |
| 2005 | "Feel Good Inc." | Best Video | Won |
| 2005 | Gorillaz | Best Producer (Gorillaz/Danger Mouse) | Won |
| 2010 | Plastic Beach | Best Album | Nominated |
| 2010 | "Stylo" | Best Video | Nominated |
| 2017 | Humanz | Best Album | Won |

== BT Music Digital Awards ==
The BT Digital Music Awards were created in the UK in 2001 and are held annually. Gorillaz have received four awards from seven nominations.

| Year | Nominee / work | Award | Result |
|---|---|---|---|
| 2005 | Gorillaz | Artist of the Year | Won |
| 2005 | Gorillaz | Best Dance Artist | Won |
| 2010 | Gorillaz | Artist of the Year | Won |
| 2010 | Gorillaz "Plastic Beach App" | Best Music App | Nominated |
| 2010 | Gorillaz "Escape to Plastic Beach" Game | Best Music App | Nominated |
| 2010 | Gorillaz "Escape to Plastic Beach" Game | Best Artist Promotion | Won |
| 2010 | Gorillaz "Plastic Beach" iTunes album | Best Artist Promotion | Nominated |

== UK Music Video Awards ==
The UK Music Video Awards is an annual award ceremony founded in 2008 to recognise creativity, technical excellence and innovation in music videos and moving images for music. Gorillaz has received one award from three nominations.

| Year | Nominee / work | Award | Result |
|---|---|---|---|
| 2010 | "On Melancholy Hill" | Best Animation | Won |
| 2012 | "DoYaThing" | Best Animation | Nominated |
| 2017 | "Saturnz Barz (Spirit House)" 360 | Best Interactive Video | Nominated |

== Webby Awards ==
A Webby Award is an award for excellence on the Internet presented annually by The International Academy of Digital Arts and Sciences.

| Year | Nominee / work | Award | Result |
|---|---|---|---|
| 2006 | Gorillaz | Special Achievement - Artist of the Year | Won |
| 2018 | GORILLAZ X E.ON: A SOLAR COLLABORATION | Online Film & Video - Music (Branded) | Won |
| 2019 | Gorillaz - #FreeMurdoc chatbot | Games & Entertainment - Apps, Mobile, and Voice | Won |

== Electronic Music Awards ==
| Year | Nominee / work | Award | Result | Ref |
|---|---|---|---|---|
| 2017 | Humanz | Album of the Year | Nominated | |

== Jim Henson Honors ==
The Jim Henson Honors is an awards program founded by The Jim Henson Company in 2005. Gorillaz have received one award from one nomination.

| Year | Nominee / work | Award | Result |
|---|---|---|---|
| 2005 | Gorillaz | The Jim Henson Creativity Honor | Won |
