= D-Sides =

2007 compilation album by Gorillaz

Compilation album by Gorillaz
- Released: 19 November 2007
- Recorded: 2004–2005
- Studio: Studio 13, London, England and Hong Kong
- Genre: Alternative rock; electronic
- Length: 117:07
- Language: English; Chinese
- Label: Parlophone, Virgin
- Producer: Gorillaz; Jason Cox; James Dring; Danger Mouse

Gorillaz album chronology
Demon Days (2005)	D-Sides (2007)	Plastic Beach (2010)

Damon Albarn chronology
The Good, the Bad & the Queen (2007)	D-Sides (2007)	Journey to the West (2008)

D-Sides is a 2007 compilation album by the British virtual band Gorillaz. The album contains B-sides and remixes from singles and bonus tracks for the band's second studio album Demon Days, as well as previously unreleased tracks recorded during the same sessions. It was released on 19 November 2007 in the UK and on 20 November in the United States and is available in standard and deluxe editions. The Japanese deluxe edition includes three extra tracks, plus the video for 'Rockit'. D-Sides performed similarly to its 2002 predecessor, G-Sides, reaching No. 63 on the UK Albums Chart, while it reached No. 71 on the US Billboard 200 chart.

== Background ==
In an interview with Verbicide magazine, band members were asked if a new remix album would be produced for Demon Days as there was for Gorillaz. They answered that it was a possibility and that might involve the Spacemonkeyz again. In the same interview, they were asked if there might also be another G-Sides. Again, their answer was that it might be possible. In January 2007, websites began listing a March release date for a Phase 2 B-sides album. One of the websites, musictap.net, later pushed this back to 3 April. According to Gorillaz-Unofficial, the reaction of official parties behind Gorillaz is that the release date is just a rumour for now. On 29 August, musictap.net reported that the B-side album would be titled D-Sides and would be released on 20 November. On 18 September 2007, the official Gorillaz fan site confirmed the release of the album, as well as unveiling the album artwork and track listing. D-Sides was released on 19 November 2007 in the UK and on 20 November 2007 in the United States.

== Critical reception ==
Professional ratings
Aggregate scores
Source	Rating
Metacritic	69/100
Review scores
Source	Rating
AllMusic	4/5 stars
The A.V. Club	B−
Drowned in Sound	5/10
Entertainment Weekly	B−
Mojo	2/5 stars
NME	8/10
Pitchfork	6.0/10
PopMatters	8/10 stars
Uncut	3/5 stars
Under the Radar	7/10

According to the review aggregator Metacritic, D-Sides received "generally favorable reviews" based on a weighted average score of 69 out of 100 from 15 critic scores.

== Track listing ==
All songs are written by Gorillaz.

D-Sides – Standard edition – Disc one
No.	Title	Original release	Length
1.	"68 State"	Feel Good Inc.	4:48
2.	"People"	Dare	3:28
3.	"Hongkongaton"	Dirty Harry	3:35
4.	"We Are Happy Landfill"	Demon Days (limited edition exclusive)	3:39
5.	"Hong Kong"	Re-recorded; originally released as part of Help: A Day in the Life compilation	7:13
6.	"Highway (Under Construction)"	Dare	4:17
7.	"Rockit"	Promotional single	3:33
8.	"Bill Murray" (featuring The Bees)	Feel Good Inc.	3:51
9.	"The Swagga"	Demon Days (limited edition exclusive)	4:57
10.	"Murdoc Is God"	Feel Good Inc. / Dirty Harry	2:26
11.	"Spitting out the Demons"	Feel Good Inc.	5:10
12.	"Don't Get Lost in Heaven" (Original Demo Version)	El Mañana / Kids with Guns	2:29
13.	"Stop the Dams" (featuring Ghostigital)	El Mañana / Kids with Guns	5:39
Total length:			55:05

D-Sides – Standard edition – Disc two
No.	Title	Original release	Length
1.	"Dare" (DFA Remix)	Promotional single	12:14
2.	"Feel Good Inc." (Stanton Warriors Remix)	Promotional single	7:24
3.	"Kids with Guns" (Jamie T's Turns to Monsters Mix)	Promotional single	4:22
4.	"Dare" (Soulwax Remix)	Dare	5:48
5.	"Kids with Guns" (Hot Chip Remix)	Promotional single	7:09
6.	"El Mañana" (Metronomy Remix)	Promotional single	5:44
7.	"Dare" (Junior Sanchez Remix)	Promotional single	5:26
8.	"Dirty Harry" (Schtung Chinese New Year Remix)	Promotional single	3:53
9.	"Kids with Guns" (Quiet Village Remix)	Promotional single	10:02
Total length:			62:02

== Charts ==
=== Weekly charts ===
Chart (2007–2020)	Peak position
Belgian Albums (Ultratop Wallonia)	99
French Albums (SNEP)	102
Hungarian Albums (MAHASZ)	30
Japanese Albums (Oricon)	184
Swiss Albums (Schweizer Hitparade)	66
UK Albums (Official Charts)	63
US Billboard 200	71
US Top Alternative Albums (Billboard)	8
US Top Dance Albums (Billboard)	2
US Top Rock Albums (Billboard)	9

=== Year-end charts ===
Chart (2008)	Position
US Top Dance/Electronic Albums (Billboard)	23
