= Demon Days Live =

2005–06 concert tour by Gorillaz

- Tour by Gorillaz
- Promotional poster for Manchester dates
- Location: Europe; North America
- Associated album: Demon Days
- Start date: 1 November 2005
- End date: 6 April 2006
- Legs: 2
- No. of shows: 10

Gorillaz concert chronology
- Gorillaz Live (2001–2002); Demon Days Live (2005–2006); Escape to Plastic Beach Tour (2010)

Demon Days Live was a limited concert tour performed by the British alternative rock virtual band Gorillaz, in support of their second studio album Demon Days. Demon Days Live consisted of two residencies, with five shows played at the Manchester Opera House in England, and another five played at New York City's Apollo Theater. The Manchester residency was later released onto DVD as Demon Days: Live at the Manchester Opera House. One of the New York shows was broadcast on MHD (now MTV Live) as Gorillaz: Live in Harlem. The Manchester Opera House film was later nominated for a Grammy Award for Best Music Film.

A live recording of the Apollo Theater performance was released as a double LP for Record Store Day in April 2025.

== Production ==
While guest artists performed under spotlights, Damon Albarn and bandmates were kept silhouetted for the entire concert.

Demon Days Live marked the first Gorillaz concert where the live band performed in full view of the audience, forgoing the "behind-the-screen" setup of Gorillaz' previous tour. Visuals and music videos tailor-made for the shows played on a large screen above the band, while the band themselves were kept silhouetted by a combination of dim lighting and colorful, illuminated back-paneling. Puppets of 2-D and Murdoc were utilized during intros and intermissions, addressing the audience and commenting on the show from the venues' balconies. The lifesize puppets were created by Jim Henson's Creature Shop; the Jim Henson Company would later award Gorillaz with the "Jim Henson Creativity Honor".

A Las Vegas residency was considered, but the "astronomical" production cost of previous shows dissuaded the band from continuing the concerts. Speaking on tour expenses, Gorillaz co-creator Jamie Hewlett explained: "The idea of putting it on in Vegas really appealed, but in the end it would have cost too much. The Demon Days Live shows actually ended up costing Damon and I money overall."

== Set list ==
The following set list was obtained from the concert held in Manchester on 1 November 2005. This set list remained the same for all shows on the tour.

Demon Days

1. "Intro"
2. "Last Living Souls"
3. "Kids with Guns" (with Neneh Cherry)
4. "O Green World"
5. "Dirty Harry" (with Bootie Brown)
6. "Feel Good Inc." (with De La Soul)
7. "El Mañana"
8. "Every Planet We Reach Is Dead" (with Ike Turner)
9. "November Has Come" (with MF Doom)
10. "All Alone" (with Roots Manuva and Martina Topley-Bird)
11. "White Light"
12. "Dare" (with Roses Gabor and Shaun Ryder)
13. "Fire Coming Out of the Monkey's Head" (Read by Dennis Hopper)
14. "Don't Get Lost in Heaven" (with The London Community Gospel Choir)
15. "Demon Days" (with The London Community Gospel Choir)

Encore

16. "Hong Kong" (with Zeng Zhen)
17. "Latin Simone (¿Qué Pasa Contigo?)" (with Ibrahim Ferrer)

== Tour dates ==
List of 2005 concerts
Date	City	Country	Venue
1 November	Manchester	England	Manchester Opera House
2 November	Manchester	England	Manchester Opera House
3 November	Manchester	England	Manchester Opera House
4 November	Manchester	England	Manchester Opera House
5 November	Manchester	England	Manchester Opera House

List of 2006 concerts
Date	City	Country	Venue
2 April	New York City	United States	Apollo Theater
3 April	New York City	United States	Apollo Theater
4 April	New York City	United States	Apollo Theater
5 April	New York City	United States	Apollo Theater
6 April	New York City	United States	Apollo Theater

== Live band ==
- Damon Albarn – vocals, piano, melodica
- Mike Smith – keyboards
- Simon Tong – guitar
- Simon Jones – guitar
- Morgan Nicholls – bass
- Cass Browne – drums
- Darren Galea – turntable
- Karl Vanden Bossche – percussion
- Wayne Hernandez – backing vocals
- Sharlene Hector – backing vocals
- Rosie Wilson – backing vocals
- Wendi Rose – backing vocals
- Aaron Sokell – backing vocals
- Isabelle Dunn – cello
- Dan Keane – cello
- Deborah Chandler – cello
- Emma Smith – bass
- Amanda Drummond – viola
- Nina Kapinsky – viola
- Gary Pomeroy – viola
- Antonia Pagulatos – violin
- Jennifer Berman – violin
- Kirsty Mangan – violin

Guest collaborators and additional musicians

- Neneh Cherry – vocals on "Kids with Guns"
- Bootie Brown – vocals on "Dirty Harry"
- De La Soul – vocals on "Feel Good Inc"
- Ike Turner – piano on "Every Planet We Reach is Dead"
- MF Doom – vocals on "November Has Come" (video only)
- Roots Manuva – vocals on "All Alone"
- Martina Topley-Bird – vocals on "All Alone"
- Rosie Wilson – vocals on "Dare"
- Shaun Ryder – vocals on "Dare"
- Dennis Hopper – narration on "Fire Coming Out of the Monkey's Head" (New York dates only)
- London Community Gospel Choir – vocals on "Don't Get Lost in Heaven" and "Demon Days"
- Zeng Zhen – guzheng on "Hong Kong"
- Ibrahim Ferrer – vocals on "Latin Simone (¿Qué Pasa Contigo?)" (video only)
