= Budni =

Budni may refer to:

- Budhni, a town in India
  - Budhni railway station
- Budnikowsky, a German drugstore chain
