= Proximus mobility =

Defunct American advertising company

- Company type: Privately held company LLC
- Industry: Marketing
- Founded: 2009; 16 years ago in Naples, Florida
- Founder: Michael Zeto and David Rippetoe
- Defunct: June 4, 2013
- Fate: Acquired
- Successor: MobileBits
- Headquarters: Atlanta, Georgia, United States
- Area served: United States
- Products: Proximity advertising systems
- Owner: MobileBits
- Number of employees: 11 (2012)
- Website: proximusmobility.com

Proximus Mobility was an American software-as-a-service (SaaS) company that has developed a proximity marketing service for retailers, malls and venues to deliver content to mobile devices via Bluetooth and Wi-Fi within 200–900 feet of the point of purchase. It was acquired by another American marketing technology company, MobileBits in 2013.

== History ==
=== Foundation and early history ===
Proximus Mobility was founded in Naples, Florida in 2009 by Michael Zeto and David Rippetoe.

After presenting at the Florida Venture Forum in September 2010, Proximus Mobility received the Newcomer of the Year Award from the Naples Economic Development Council. Citing a lack of incentives for tech companies from the Florida government, Michael Zeto began searching for office space in Boston and Atlanta. At that point in time, Proximus Mobility was closing on a $2 million round of venture capitalist funding.

One of Proximus Mobility clients while headquartered in Naples, Florida was the ACE Group Classic.

=== Move to Atlanta ===
Proximus Mobility moved to Atlanta in the summer of 2011, where the company's offices currently reside within Georgia Tech's Advanced Technology Development Center (ATDC) building on campus.

Georgia governor Nathan Deal touted Proximus Mobility's decision to move its headquarters to Atlanta as a "great credit to [the state of Georgia's] established infrastructure for high-tech companies that provides them with access to intellectual capital and some of the nation’s brightest talent for this industry." Governor Deal also stated that Proximus Mobility would bring at least 100 jobs to the state of Georgia.

=== Acquisition ===
The company was acquired by MobileBits in 2013.
