= Hypertag =

Software companies of the United Kingdom

- Company type: Private company
- Industry: Marketing
- Founded: 2001; 25 years ago
- Defunct: 2011
- Fate: Acquired
- Successor: Proxama
- Headquarters: Norwich, United Kingdom
- Products: Wireless technology, digital content

Hypertag was a British marketing technology company founded in 2001 that supplied proprietary proximity marketing technology to brands. The company was purchased by Proxama Ltd in 2011.

== History ==
The company was established in 2001 and headquartered in Norwich. The company aimed for consumer's mobile phones based on their proximity to a physical location through the utilization of short-range mobile wireless technologies including Bluetooth, Infrared, Wi-Fi, and NFC.

Hypertag's offered free downloading of digital content directly to consumer's mobile phones, such as, wallpapers, video clips, games, music clips, vouchers, documents, web links, or mobile applications. Hypertag also attempted to integrate its systems with certain third-party infrastructure providers, such as in-store advertising display screen providers, and was utilized by brands like O2, Vodafone, Peugeot, and CNN. The company also implemented it's systems at visitor attractions, owned by the Royal Institution and English Heritage.

As an example, a campaign in 2005 ran posters advertising a new Gorillaz single DARE were established in Sydney and Melbourne, Australia in September 2005. The posters contained Hypertag technology allowing passers-by to download a 40-second ringtone of the song DARE to their mobile phones.

The technology was also used by the band New Order in advertisements for their album Waiting for the Sirens' Call, and in 2008, Hypertag won a gold award for best location-based advertising technology at the Mobile Advertising and Marketing Awards.

Hypertag was bought by Proxama Ltd on 14 January 2011.

== See also ==
- Proximity marketing
- Mobile marketing
