= MobileBits =

MobileBits Corporation
- Industry: Mobile marketing and engagement
- Founded: 2010; 16 years ago
- Headquarters: Sarasota, Florida
- Key people: Walter Kostiuk, Founder.
- Products: Samy Mobile app, Pringo Social Media Software, Proximus Mobile Marketing Solution
- Number of employees: 78
- Website: mobilebits.com

MobileBits Corporation is an American marketing technology/advertising company that operated a pure brand mobile marketing and engagement network called Samy and which markets a software platform for developing mobile shopping applications.

== History ==
MobileBits Corporation is a United States mobile technology company. Walter Kostiuk, a former BlackBerry executive, founded the company in 2010 Between 2011 and 2013, MobileBits acquired 3 companies to help accelerate grow of its IP holdings, product platform and software development resources starting with the merger of Pringo Inc. on July 1, 2011 bringing a social media integrated development platform called Pringo Connect. MobileBits then acquired Aixum Tec on August 20, 2012 bringing it an enterprise back-end software system developed for retailers to market exclusive offers, deals and coupons as well as deliver digital loyalty and rewards cards on mobile devices called Samy4me. The Company also acquired the assets of Proximus Mobility, an Atlanta-based hyperlocal proximity based marketing software company on June 4, 2013 bringing the Samy product enhanced proximity and geofencing capabilities.

== Product ==
On August 30, 2012, MobileBits introduced SAMY, a shopping application for iPhone and Android. A store, merchant, or retailer can upload vouchers, offers, create loyalty cards and create messages in the application. Those vouchers, offers and loyalty cards can be viewed by users of the application. Users can select specific companies that are listed in the application to add to their, 'My Samy' section of the mobile application. SAMY supports over 35,000 merchants in Switzerland, Canada, and the United States. Due to the success of the Samy mobile application and business model, MobileBits Inc, in 2016 subsequently introduced a white label version of their technology for third party partners to deploy in local markets. It is defined as a mobile commerce Network platform.

== Partners ==
In 2012, Quantum Group partnered with MobileBits to provide access to SAMY for all of Quantum Groups merchants through their existing Point of Sale systems.

In May 2013, MobileBits signed a strategic agreement with DDR Corp. (now SITE Centers), a real estate investment trust. The agreement provided for the acquisition of DDR's proprietary location-based mobile marketing solution called ValuText and the opportunity for MobileBits to distribute Samy through 450 shopping centers.

MobileBits-owned marketing and engagement network Samy, finalized an exclusive multi-year agreement with Ignivia Technologies on July 8, 2013 to provide Samy services in Turkey, the United Arab Emirates (UAE), Kuwait, Bahrain, Qatar, Oman, Saudi Arabia, Jordan and Lebanon.

In 2013, MobileBits received a job creation grant from Sarasota County FL with support of the Economic Development Council of Sarasota (EDC).

== Awards ==
MobileBits has received numerous awards for its Mobile Commerce Network and Samy products including a being recognized by the Local Search Association and Local Media Associations as having the "Best New Revenue Solution in Mobile" for the local media industry. There was a 3rd-place finish at the 2013 CTIA E-Tec for best Mobile Apps, Money, Payments, Banking, Mobile Commerce, Shopping & Rewards.

Finalist at the 2013 Tampa Bay Business Journals 2013 BizTech Awards.

Winner of the 2012 Effective Mobile Marketing Awards for Most Effective Mobile Couponing or Barcode Campaign - McDonald's Euro 2012 Campaign.

Three Super Star first-place finishes at MobileVillage Mobile Star Awards in 2012 for Best SUCCESS STORIES: Mobile Marketing – McDonald's & SAMY; Best ENTERPRISE SOLUTIONS: Marketing; Best CONSUMER APPS: Shopping or Sales.

== See also ==
- Mobile advertising
- Mobile marketing
