= Close range marketing =

Close range marketing, commonly referred to as CRM, is a form of proximity marketing. Close Range Marketing is an emerging technology that allows businesses to both promote goods and services and involve their customers in interacting with the business. It commonly uses bluetooth technology to transfer content to cellular devices or laptops within the range of the transmitter. While Bluetooth is the most common means of transmitting, other signal types such as Wi-Fi and FM are becoming more common.

In order for close range marketing to work effectively, a person needs to have some sort of application installed to his mobile device that accepts push notifications. One example of CRM use is the use of coupons. A user receives a coupon notification from an application that he previously installed saying that there is a store nearby that he can make use of that coupon. Another example of CRM includes the usage of beacons. Setting up beacons throughout the store makes it possible to track the customer while they are inside. The beacons can show which areas of the store are least or most popular.
