= Democrazy =

EP by Damon Albarn
- Released: 8 December 2003
- Recorded: June–July 2003, various US hotels
- Genres: Lo-fi; electronic; indie rock
- Length: 29:30
- Label: Honest Jon's
- Producer: Damon Albarn

Damon Albarn chronology
Think Tank (2003)	Democrazy (2003)	Demon Days (2005)

Damon Albarn solo chronology
Democrazy (2003)	Dr Dee (2012)

Singles from Democrazy
- 1. "A Rappy Song" Released: 8 November 2004

Democrazy is a 2003 vinyl-only double EP of demos by Damon Albarn, frontman of English rock band Blur and the virtual band Gorillaz. It was released through Honest Jon's record label.

== Background ==
Albarn recorded these songs, which are little more than demos, during the US leg of Blur's tour for Think Tank in various hotel rooms. He then decided to issue the result, on 8 December that year, in a double 10" vinyl set on his Honest Jon's label. On 22 December Albarn showcased the demos at a live gig in London's Neighbourhood club.

Some of the EP's tracks were later finished and repurposed for Albarn's other projects; the track "I Need a Gun" was used as the basis for the Gorillaz song "Dirty Harry", which appeared on their 2005 album Demon Days, while the track "Half a Song" was repurposed 20 years later as "The Ballad" appearing on Blur's ninth studio album The Ballad of Darren (2023). The track "A Rappy Song" has often been mis-labeled as an unnamed Gorillaz' track featuring Bootie Brown and Cee-Lo Green, however the song is little more than a remix made by a fan.

== Critical reception ==
Professional ratings
Aggregate scores
Source	Rating
Metacritic	45/100
Review scores
Source	Rating
Cokemachineglow	25%
Dotmusic	3/10
The Guardian	3/5 stars
Mojo	3/5 stars
NME	2/10
Pitchfork	3.2/10
Q	3/5 stars
Stylus	F
Uncut	6/10

The EP received mixed-to-negative reviews from music critics. At Metacritic, which assigns a normalized rating out of 100 to reviews from critics, the album received an average score of 45, which indicates "mixed or average reviews", based on 9 reviews. Alexis Petridis of The Guardian described the album as "occasionally brilliant and frequently irritating beyond belief" and wrote: "It is packed with interesting ideas, but is founded in an appalling self-importance." Mark Beaumont of NME panned the album, describing it as "the half conceived, cottonmouthed rubbish." Pitchfork Media critic Jedediah Gilchrist stated: "He's already recorded such a wealth of great material that no mystique remains, leaving no real reason for anyone—including the most dedicated fan—to seek out these poorly produced musical shreds." Scott of Stylus Magazine wrote: "Serving as nothing more than a temporary diversion or side note to his fully realised work, this is worth a cursory listen for the insight alone."

== Track listing ==
=== Disc one ===
1. "I Need a Gun" (demo version of "Dirty Harry") – 1:25
2. "Reedz" – 1:22
3. "Half a Song" (demo version of "The Ballad") – 1:06
4. "Five Star Life" – 2:45
5. "A Rappy Song" – 1:40
6. "Back to Mali" – 1:04
7. "I Miss You" – 2:21
8. "Hymn to Moon" – 1:01

=== Disc two ===
1. "Dezert" – 2:51
2. "Sub Species of an American Day" – 2:25
3. "American Welfare Poem" – 3:06
4. "Saz Theory Book" – 2:35
5. "Gotta' Get Down With the Passing of Time" – 2:17
6. "End of Democrazy" – 3:39
