= Proximity marketing =

Localized distribution of advertising content

Proximity marketing is the localized Wireless distribution of advertising content associated with a particular place. Transmissions can be received by individuals in that location who wish to receive them and have the necessary equipment to do so.

Distribution may be via a traditional localized broadcast, or more commonly is specifically targeted to devices known to be in a particular area.

The location of a device may be determined by:

- A cellular phone being in a particular cell
- A Bluetooth- or Wi-Fi-enabled device being within range of a transmitter
- An Internet enabled device with GPS enabling it to request localized content from Internet servers
- A NFC enabled phone can read a RFID chip on a product or media and launch localized content from internet servers

Communications may be further targeted to specific groups within a given location, for example content in tourist hot spots may only be distributed to devices registered outside the local area.

Communications may be both time and place specific, e.g. content at a conference venue may depend on the event in progress.

Uses of proximity marketing include distribution of media at concerts, information (weblinks on local facilities), gaming and social applications, and advertising.

== Bluetooth-based systems ==
Bluetooth, a short-range Wireless system supported by many mobile devices, is one transmission medium used for proximity marketing. The process of Bluetooth-based proximity marketing involves setting up Bluetooth "broadcasting" equipment at a particular location and then sending information which can be text, images, audio or video to Bluetooth enabled devices within range of the broadcast server. These devices are often referred to as beacons. Other standard data exchange formats such as vCard can also be used. This form of proximity marketing is also referred to as close range marketing.

It used to be the case that due to security fears, or a desire to save battery life, many users keep their Bluetooth devices in OFF mode, or ON but not set to be 'discoverable'. Because of this, often regions where Bluetooth proximity marketing is in operation it is accompanied by advising via traditional media - such as posters, television screens or field marketing teams - suggesting people make their Bluetooth handsets 'discoverable' in order to receive free content - this is often referred to as a "Call-to-Action." A 'discoverable' Bluetooth device within range of the server is automatically sent a message asking if the user would like to receive the free content.

Current mobile phones usually have bluetooth switched ON by default, and some users leave bluetooth switched on for easy connection with car kits and headsets.

== Wi-Fi-based systems ==
There are systems capable of detecting certain signals periodically emitted by any electronic devices equipped with Wi-Fi or Bluetooth technology, and the subsequent use of gathered information to detect the position or presence of, and/or flows of information to and from, said devices, in a statistical or aggregate form.

This technology is used in a manner equivalent to other systems, such as Radio-frequency Identification (RFID), which serve for locating devices within a controlled environment; it works in conjunction with signals from Wi-Fi issuers (also called wireless tags) and receiving antennas, in different locations, so that the movements and presence of Wi-Fi-equipped devices can be analyzed in terms of arrival time, length of visit per zone, paths of movement, general flows, etc.

The continuously increasing use of smartphones and tablets has fueled a boom in Wi-Fi tracking technology, specially in the retail environment. Such technology can be used by managers of a physical business to ascertain how many devices are present in a given area, and to observe or optimize business marketing and management.

Technically, such technology is based on two main models:

1. Re-use of standard Access Point (AP) technologies with a Captive Portal, already deployed in numerous locations (airports, malls, shops, etc.).

2. Use of antennas for the detection of signals in the 2.4 or 5 GHz frequency bands, positioning the detected devices within strategic areas, in order to obtain a unique identifier about every mobile device is detected in such locations, and with the corresponding HTML5, iOS and Android SDKs integrated in any APP or Web, allowing interaction by proximity with the users through the mobile devices.

The first option manifests weaker ability to detect and send messages to the public, because AP devices were created for purposes other than wireless tracking and operate by extracting information only from select devices (smartphones or tablets which have previously connected to the AP in question). In practice, and depending on the environment, as many as 10-20% of visitors access to the captive portal when they visit a point of sale

The second option is to analyze all signals detected within the bands used by the Wi-Fi and Bluetooth technology, offering a higher detection ratio of total visitors (about 60%-70%) and extracting behavior patterns that allow the assignment of a unique identifier, each time a device is detected. Such identifiers are not linked to any data present on the device, nor to any information from the device manufacturer, so that relation to any particular user of the device cannot be made. Unlike in the above case, visitor security (in the sense of anonymity) is total.

Assignment of the same unique identifier to tracking information obtained by the antennas, APP and Webs APIs remains a challenge, and allows to have both online and offline behaviour information to optimize proximity communication campaigns in a non-intrusive way.

== NFC-based systems ==
Near Field Communication (NFC) tags are embedded in the NFC Smart Poster, Smart Product or Smart Book. The tag has a RFID chip with an embedded command. The command can be to open the mobile browser on a given page or offer. Any NFC-enabled phone can activate this tag by placing the device in close proximity. The information can be anything from product details, special accommodation deals, and information on local restaurants.

The German drugstore chain, Budnikowsky, launched the first NFC-enabled Smart Poster in October 2011 which allowed train commuters to tap their phones on the poster to shop and find more information. in November 2011, Atria Books/Simon & Schuster launched the Impulse Economy, the first NFC-enabled Smart Book.

In the UK NFC is being adopted by most of the outdoor poster contractors. Clear Channel have installed over 25,000 Adshel posters with NFC tags (and QR codes for Apple phones).

Retailers are also looking at NFC as it offers a cost-effective method by which consumers can engage with brands but doesn't require integrating the technology into their IT systems - which is a barrier to many new technologies like BLE. A number of retailers have already started using NFC to enhance the shopping experience, Casino in France and Vic in Holland.

Proximity Marketing Strategy using NFC Technology has been widely adopted in Japan and uses 'pull' rather than 'push' marketing allowing the consumer the choice of where and when they receive marketing messages.

There are a number NFC-enabled phones entering the market spurred by NFC mobile wallet trials globally. NFC wallets include the Google Wallet and ISIS (mobile payment system). While mobile payment is the driver for NFC, proximity marketing is an immediate beneficiary in-market.

Apple did not include this technology in their initial smartphone models. Apple added NFC to the iPhone 6 and iPhone 6 Plus.

== GSM-based systems ==
Proximity Marketing via SMS relies on GSM 03.41 which defines the Short Message Service - Cell Broadcast. SMS-CB allows messages (such as advertising or public information) to be broadcast to all mobile users in a specified geographical area. In the Philippines, GSM-based proximity broadcast systems are used by select Government Agencies for information dissemination on Government-run community-based programs to take advantage of its reach and popularity (Philippines has the world's highest traffic of SMS). It is also used for commercial service known as Proxima SMS. Bluewater, a super-regional shopping centre in the UK, has a GSM based system supplied by NTL to help its GSM coverage for calls, it also allows each customer with a mobile phone to be tracked though the centre which shops they go into and for how long. The system enables special offer texts to be sent to the phone.

== See also ==
- Mobile marketing
- Narrowcasting
- Geotargeting
- Sideloading
- Low-power broadcasting
- Locative media
- Location-based service
- Hypertag
- Spamming
