= Budnikowsky =

German drug store chain

- Type: Private
- Industry: Retail (Drugstore)
- Founded: 1912
- Headquarters: Hamburg, Germany
- Website: http://www.budni.de/

Budnikowsky (Budni for short) is a German drugstore chain based in Hamburg. It is Germany's fourth largest drugstore retailer after dm-drogerie markt, Rossmann, and Müller.

The company's first store was established by Ivan Budnikowsky in 1912, in Harburg, Hamburg. Budnikowsky started franchising in 2007 at a time when they had 108 stores, seen as a rather small drugstore chain for Germany. Today, the company operates over 170 stores, many of which are based in the Hamburg Metropolitan Region. In 2019, it collaborated with the supermarket chain Edeka.
