= Demon Days =

2005 studio album by Gorillaz

Studio album by Gorillaz
- Released: 11 May 2005
- Recorded: 2004
- Studios: Unit 13 at Buspace, London; Pierce Entertainment (Pierce Room Studios), London
- Genres: Alternative rock; hip hop; trip hop; pop; art rock
- Length: 50:47
- Labels: Parlophone; Virgin; EMI
- Producers: Gorillaz; Danger Mouse; Jason Cox; James Dring

Gorillaz album chronology
| Laika Come Home (2002) | Demon Days (2005) | D-Sides (2007) |

Damon Albarn chronology
| Democrazy (2003) | Demon Days (2005) | The Good, the Bad & the Queen (2007) |

Singles from Demon Days
- 1. "Feel Good Inc." Released: 9 May 2005; 2. "Dare" Released: 29 August 2005; 3. "Dirty Harry" Released: 21 November 2005; 4. "Kids with Guns" / "El Mañana" Released: 10 April 2006

Demon Days is the second studio album by the British virtual band Gorillaz. It was released on 11 May 2005 in Japan, 23 May 2005 in the United Kingdom by Parlophone, and 24 May 2005 in the United States by Virgin Records. The album was recorded at Studio 13, based in London, United Kingdom, and was primarily produced by Danger Mouse, alongside the band themselves, Jason Cox, and James Dring. The album features guest appearances from De La Soul, Neneh Cherry, Martina Topley-Bird, Roots Manuva, MF Doom, Ike Turner, Bootie Brown of The Pharcyde, Shaun Ryder, and Dennis Hopper.

The album continues the band's musical approach of incorporating a wide variety of genres and styles, including alternative rock, hip-hop, pop, trip hop and art rock. Its lyrics and tone are darker than those of the band's eponymous debut album (2001), addressing apocalyptic and post-9/11 political themes. Gorillaz frontman and co-creator Damon Albarn has described it as a loose concept album exploring "the world in a state of night", citing as inspiration a trip he took through impoverished areas of rural China. As with the band's previous album, the release of Demon Days was promoted across various multimedia, including interactive websites, animated music videos, and animatics created by Gorillaz co-creator Jamie Hewlett and his production company Zombie Flesh Eaters. The album produced four singles: "Feel Good Inc.", "Dare", "Dirty Harry", and the double A-side "El Mañana" / "Kids with Guns".

Demon Days was a major commercial success, debuting at number one on the UK Albums Chart and number six on the US Billboard 200. The album has sold eight million copies worldwide, surpassing sales of the band's debut album. It was later certified six times platinum in the UK and double platinum in the US. Lead single "Feel Good Inc." topped the US Billboard Modern Rock Tracks chart for eight consecutive weeks and won the band its sole Grammy Award in 2006 for Best Pop Collaboration with Vocals. Forgoing a traditional tour, the band promoted the album with concert residencies in Manchester and New York City billed as Demon Days Live, performing the album in full across five shows in each city. During these performances, which featured almost all of the guest artists on the album, Albarn and the band performed on stage in silhouette alongside a screen displaying Hewlett's visuals. As with the band's first album, B-sides and outtakes from the album's sessions were later released as a compilation album, D-Sides (2007), while the album's music videos and assorted multimedia were compiled into the video album Phase Two: Slowboat to Hades (2006).

Demon Days received positive reviews upon release, with reviewers noting that the album established Gorillaz as a serious musical project as opposed to a one-off side effort. It has since garnered further acclaim as one of the best Gorillaz albums and one of the greatest albums of the 21st century, with particular praise for its eclectic genre-bending musical style, prescient postmodern themes and dark, haunting atmosphere. In 2023, Rolling Stone ranked Demon Days number 437 on its list of the 500 Greatest Albums of All Time.

== Background ==
While Jamie Hewlett was working with his team on a script for a possible Gorillaz movie, Damon Albarn was still recording Think Tank with Blur. By the time Albarn was ready to start writing and recording material for the Gorillaz movie, the whole idea had already been scrapped, although ideas from the movie's script were still used, including the themes of being driven by ego and the world being trapped in an endless night. Despite this, the album's main source of inspiration actually came about as a result of Albarn's train journey from Beijing to Mongolia where he, his partner and six-year-old daughter spent a day travelling through what Albarn describes as a "weird, unspoken, forgotten part of China. It was basically dead trees as far as the eye can see." Albarn recalls:

Dust bowls, loose earth rapidly turning into desert. There are little satellite towns in the middle of these semi deserts that are absolutely on their knees. And it's the size of Europe this area. And then you wake up in the morning with this nightmare in your head and it's blue sky and beautiful sand, which looks fantastic now but was probably something else millions of years ago. And that will happen to us in our lifetime.

Albarn stated in an interview with MTV News that "Gorillaz make dark pop; that's what they always set out to achieve. The whole album kind of tells the story of the night – staying up during the night – but it's also an allegory. It's what we're living in basically, the world in a state of night."

Hewlett was excited by the prospect of a second Gorillaz album, saying, "Let's repeat the same process, but do it better. Because everyone thought it was a gimmick. If you do it again, it's no longer a gimmick, and if it works then we've proved a point. And instantly, all of us got excited".

== Recording ==
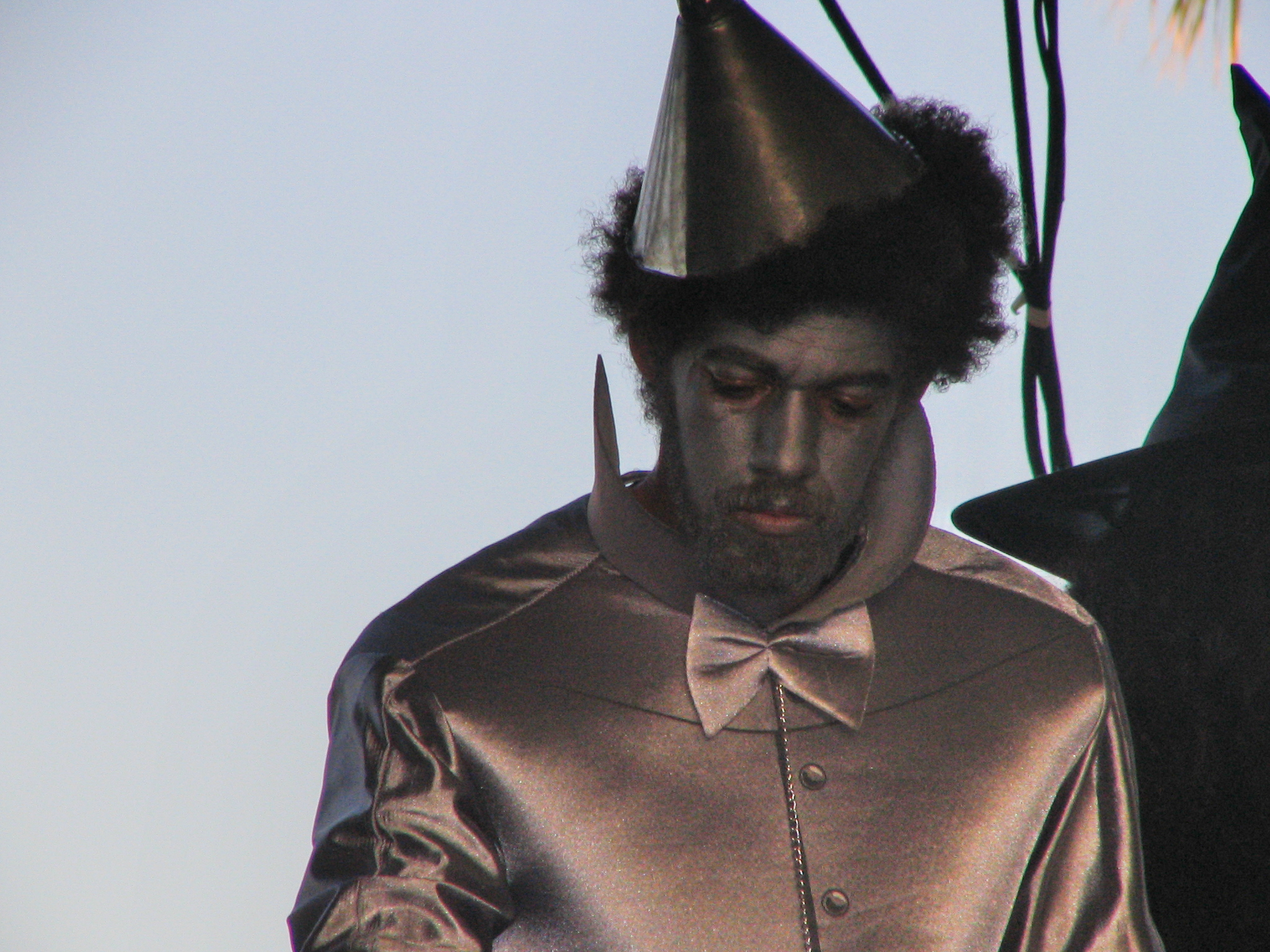
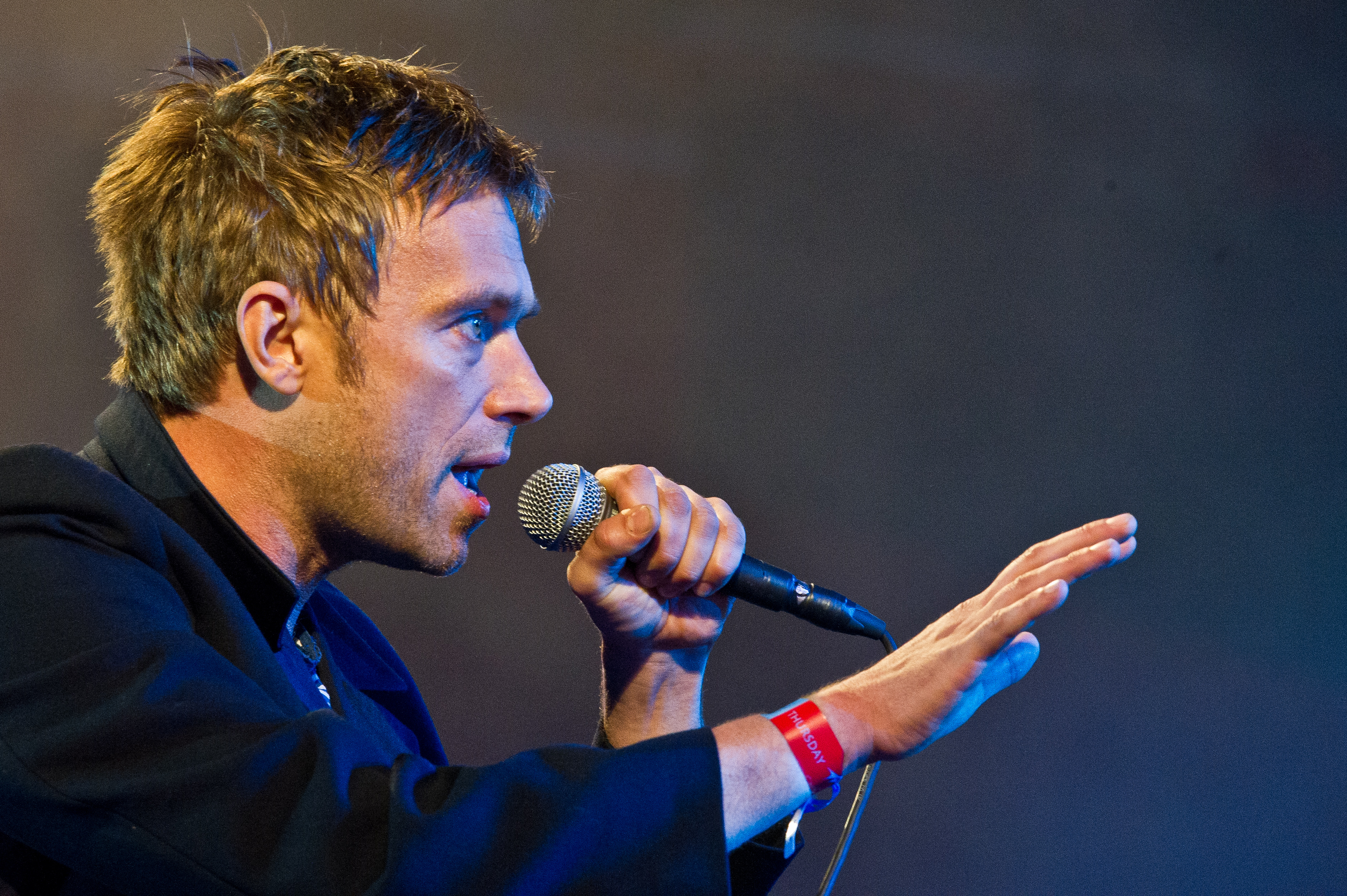
The album was produced by Danger Mouse alongside Gorillaz lead singer Damon Albarn.

The most obvious difference on the band's second offering is the absence of Dan "the Automator" Nakamura as the acting musical producer. Instead, Albarn reached out to Danger Mouse based on the strength of The Grey Album, which brought Danger Mouse to prominence for mixing Jay-Z's The Black Album. "Dan [the Automator] wasn't busy, the project just needed a slightly different approach," Albarn explained. "Danger Mouse, in my opinion, is one of the best young producers in the world. I think the last record was a lot more simplistic. It was virgin territory – animated hip-hop, reggae, stroke-rock, Latin rock – there's a lot more intricacy with this record." For the major part of recording Demon Days, Albarn returned to Unit 13 at Buspace Studios, where he recorded a huge part of Gorillaz' self-titled debut album. Danger Mouse joined the project on 7 April 2004. Danger Mouse was a longtime fan of Albarn's other band Blur, the feelings of admiration and respect were mutual. "It was a no-brainer when there was interest there from Damon," Burton said. "I heard demos of the new record, but the biggest part was getting the chance to be a part of something that's so strong – you just gotta jump on it. I had a very up-and-down year [in 2004], but it was definitely a big up when I got a chance to [work with Gorillaz]."

"I learned so much working on the record with Damon", claimed Danger Mouse. "...and it was sink or swim. You just pick it up. At the end of the day, the people you're working with – whether it's the choir or string section or guitarist – are specialized in what they do. All you have to do is figure out the best thing they're doing and how it's going to fit within the context of the whole project. That goes back to putting together a song on a computer-based program. You're looking for all the parts that are going to make something sound right. It's also being able to communicate. I had done stuff before Gorillaz – like the Pelican City stuff – where I worked with musicians, so it wasn't completely foreign to me."

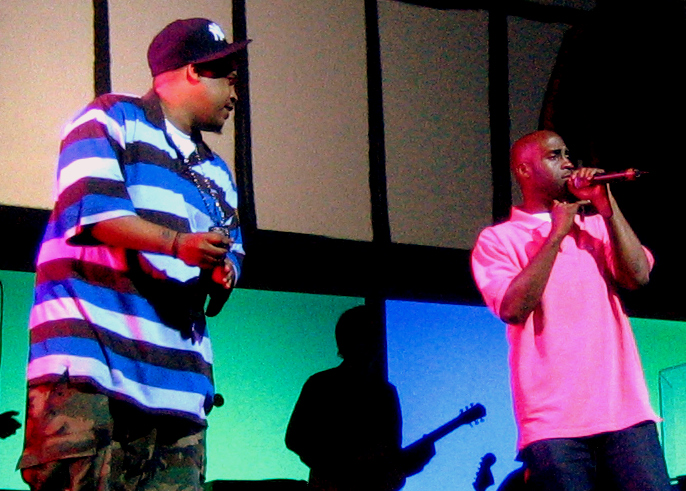
De La Soul is featured on the most successful Gorillaz song, "Feel Good Inc.".

As on Gorillaz, there are plenty of guest collaborators, including rappers De La Soul, Bootie Brown from the Pharcyde, and MF Doom along with Ike Turner on keyboards, the singer Shaun Ryder from Happy Mondays and the actor and director Dennis Hopper, who narrates a parable ("Fire Coming Out of the Monkey's Head") about innocence, greed and retribution set to a droll reggae bounce. That song leads into a stretch of ethereal vocal harmonies, in a clear homage to the Beach Boys. Albarn said he couldn't make the vocal parts sound right until he had a minor revelation. "If you've ever seen the Beach Boys in footage, they're all smiling, desperately keeping the upbeat Beach Boy thing alive, while Brian Wilson is just absolutely glum as hell. So I did three harmonies smiling with my face. And then one just being really miserable, which was Brian. Now it's got that vibe." Hopper can also be heard on the title track of the band's ninth studio album The Mountain, which utilises an unused outtake from Hopper's appearance on "Fire Coming Out of the Monkey's Head".

The recording of Dennis Hoppers narration was done at EMI Music Publishing Studio, also known as EMI Demo studio, which can be seen in the Gorillaz' documentary Bananaz. When asked in a Reddit AMA about working with Hopper, Albarn said "we did it in a cobbled back street in a basement studio owned by emi pubilshing next to the Astoria theatre in London which is sadly no more...To be honest i was incredibily shy to talk to him. i was given the opportunity to meet him at an award ceremony at hackney empire, and when my chance came i hid behind a pillar in the theatre, and when i thought the coast was clear i stepped out from behind it and accidently bumped into him and then i had to pop the question , it turned out his son Henry was a big fan and i think thats why he did it. He was very sweet and a absolutely lovely guy.."

"Kids with Guns" was inspired by a boy in Albarn's daughter's class who turned up to school with a knife. "A nice boy", said Albarn, "just decided to pick up a knife and show it to his friends at lunchtime. It's a very real problem, but I'm not treating it as a problem. It's part of the brutalisation of a generation that's going on at the moment". "Fire Coming Out of the Monkey's Head", meanwhile, is a parable read by Dennis Hopper that seems to have clear parallels with the war for oil.

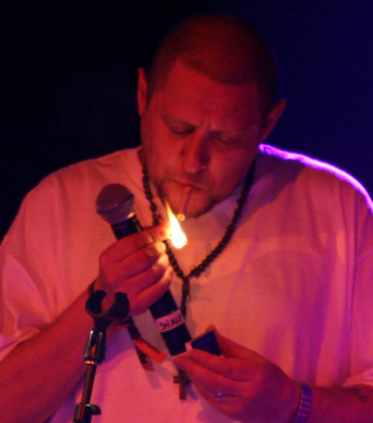
Happy Mondays singer Shaun Ryder is featured on "Dare", the only Gorillaz song to peak number one in United Kingdom.

Regarding the song "Dare" and the collaboration with Shaun Ryder, Albarn also said: "I love Shaun Ryder. During the whole Oasis thing, he and Bernard Sumner were the only two who cared about what I was going through. Being constantly taken the piss out of by Noel & Liam (Gallagher). How can you fight when you've got the tabloids and a working class attitude on your back? You're fucked. But Shaun was really sweet to me and made me feel a whole lot better about it. Because I did get quite upset about it, so was selecting Shaun karma in action, then? Yeah, definitely". The song's title is purported to have come about due to Ryder's thick Mancunian accent; he was unable to say the phrase "It's There", which was the song's original title, so it was changed simply to "Dare". Roses Gabor takes over the role of Noodle from Miho Hatori, who provided the vocals for her on the first album. Albarn provides backing vocals; however, to blend his vocals with Gabor's, his voice was toned down to be slightly covered up. Albarn's full vocalization can be heard on the D-Sides remix album. D-Sides features a demo version of "Dare" entitled "People". This version contains the same background beat while lacking the majority of the keyboards and effects in the final recording. Unlike the final version, it is completely sung by Albarn and features an Omnichord breakdown.

Rapper Roots Manuva and Martina Topley-Bird appear on the track "All Alone" (the instrumental of which was partially recorded in Africa) and also recorded another track entitled "Snakes and Ladders". The track does not appear on the album or D-Sides, however, the track was sampled by Topley-Bird for her song "Soldier Boy", which appears as a B-side for her song "Poison" which features Roots Manuva and features a production credit for Gorillaz. Although the track was not used on Demon Days or D-Sides, the line "Who put the chemicals in food chain?", said by Manuva in the song, was sampled on the album track 'Intro'. The recording of 'Snakes and Ladders' can be seen on the Gorillaz documentary Bananaz where the sampled line is called "an amazing hook" by Albarn.

Then from October to November 28th 2004, the team working on Demon Days moved Pierce Room Studios, also known as Pierce Entertainment, to complete overdubs and final mixing. From January 10th to 12th, the album was mastered at Masterdisk, in New York, by Howie Weinberg.

== Musical style and themes ==
Sputnikmusic wrote that the album's style "is a strong foray into the melding of hip hop into pop and rock music." Vice called the album a "British pop masterpiece", and wrote that its music "flits between UK rap, alternative rock, piano-pop, trip-hop, reggae, and Beach Boys psychedelia". The Unapologists called the album "both a typical post-9/11 political statement and mid-2000s alt-rock masterpiece". Spin described the album as a "slinky folk-disco-hip-hop-Afro-pop-punk expedition". Robert Christgau labelled the album "pop trip-hop", while Happy Mag listed it as a key work in the art rock style.

Demon Days prominently makes use of string sections, which were organized under the lead of Isabelle Dunn, who formed Demon Strings for the album and its later live performances. Choirs are also incorporated, including the San Fernandez Youth Chorus on "Dirty Harry", and the London Community Gospel Choir on the album's final two tracks, "Don't Get Lost in Heaven" and "Demon Days".

Albarn has said that the album is meant to be a depiction of a journey through the night in which each track represents a confrontation with a personal "demon". The album also has many lyrical themes centered on the destruction humans are causing worldwide; speaking about the track "Fire Coming Out of the Monkey's Head", Albarn explained, "That came from a very naive idea, which is: what is going to happen when they've taken all of the oil out of the earth? Aren't there going to be these vast holes? Surely those holes shouldn't be empty. Surely there is a reason why they had all of this in. It's like bad plastic surgery, eventually it collapses." Mike Schiller of PopMatters wrote that Demon Days "[provides] its listeners not with a story arc, but a "music arc" [which] starts off slow, and honestly, not all that strange", describing the first few tracks as "[sounding] a bit like the Casioed version of a mid-'90s trip-hop album." The album's opener, "Intro" contains a sample from "Dark Earth", from the soundtrack to the 1978 film Dawn of the Dead.

== Release and marketing ==
Demon Days was first mentioned in articles detailing the reopening of Gorillaz' website in early December 2004. Initially, a March or April 2005 release date was announced, but this date was later pushed back. In an article for Q in February 2005, it was reported that the album was to be titled We Are Happy Landfill. Another early title was reported to be Reject False Icons, which is also the title of Gorillaz' culture jamming project. In January 2005, a promo for the song "Dirty Harry" was released as a white label 12", and an exclusive video was released online entitled "Rockit". It was later reported that the track would not appear on the album, although it later appeared on D-Sides, a collection of remixes, rare songs and B-sides released in November 2007. Demon Days' lead single "Feel Good Inc." became Gorillaz' biggest hit at the time, while the album's second single, "Dare" featuring Shaun Ryder, was a big hit as well and gave the band their first number one single in the UK. Since its release, Demon Days has been certified double platinum in the US and 6× platinum in the UK.

The limited edition of the album includes a DVD containing the video, audio commentary and an animatic for the music video "Feel Good Inc.", short animated films featuring the band, an exclusive audio track titled "The Swagga" and online access to exclusive sections of the band's website, with various wallpapers and screensavers, as well as a crowbar, facilitating the opening of a locked cupboard in the kitchen on Gorillaz.com in order to download the song, "Happy Landfill". This content is no longer available, however, the track appears on D-Sides (re-titled "We Are Happy Landfill").

=== Reject False Icons ===
The phrase "Reject False Icons" was first mentioned on 24 November 2004 on a Gorillaz mail out to fans. On 8 December, the Gorillaz website was re-opened with a brand new music video, "Rockit", which has the saying "Reject False Icons" at the end. On 19 December, the "Reject False Icons" campaign kicked off with the launch of rejectfalseicons.com. Fans could submit their photos of ways to spread the message by using graffiti or by sticking "Reject False Icons" stickers that were available for a limited period from the site and from selected record shops in the UK.

=== Search for a Star ===
In December 2004, Gorillaz launched their own talent contest, Search for a Star, to find an artist to collaborate with. There were on average over 100 entries per week whittled down to around 10 to be put forward for the public vote. The 200+ entries were viewed over a million times. A gallery room was added to Kong Studios which displayed all of the entries. Gorillaz' competition was initially run to pick just one winner from entries submitted to Gorillaz.com. However, at the end of the competition, it was announced that two further entries – one from the submitted images, and one from the submitted audio files – would be chosen by online vote.

All three collaborated on the fourth single release of Phase Two, "Kids with Guns" / "El Mañana". Sourbee provided his animated incarnation of the "Don't Get Lost in Heaven (Original Demo Version)" B-side, featured on the DVD version of the single. Asidus made a "Dirty Harry" remix called "Uno Quatro" featured on the Gorillaz website. Irina Bolshakova aka Schneeflocke created her own artistic interpretation of "El Mañana", featured on an insert included on the DVD version of the single. The winners were also originally supposed to have their own rooms in Kong Studios, but that never came to pass.

== Singles ==
- "Feel Good Inc." was the first single released from the album. It was released as a single in the UK and Australia on 9 May 2005, and charted at number two in the UK, number 14 on the Billboard Hot 100 and number one on the Billboard Hot Modern Rock Tracks.
- "Dare" was the second single released from the album. It was released on 29 August 2005 in the UK. The single charted at number one on the UK Singles Chart, number eight on the Billboard Modern Rock Tracks and number 87 on the Billboard Hot 100.
- "Dirty Harry" was the third single released from the album. It was released on 21 November 2005 in the UK, and charted at number six on the UK Singles Chart.
- "Kids with Guns" / "El Mañana" was the fourth, fifth, and final single released from the album. It was released on 10 April 2006 in the UK. The winners for the Search for a Star competition collaborated with Gorillaz in various ways on the single. The single charted at number 27 on the UK Singles Chart.

== Reception ==
Professional ratings
Aggregate scores
| Source | Rating |
|---|---|
| Metacritic | 82/100 |
Review scores
| Source | Rating |
| AllMusic | 5/5 stars |
| Entertainment Weekly | B |
| The Guardian | 4/5 stars |
| Los Angeles Times | 3.5/4 stars |
| Mojo | 4/5 stars |
| NME | 8/10 |
| Pitchfork | 6.9/10 |
| Q | 4/5 stars |
| Rolling Stone | 3/5 stars |
| Spin | B |

According to the review aggregator Metacritic, Demon Days received "universal acclaim" based on a weighted average score of 82 out of 100 from 37 critic scores. AllMusic editor Stephen Thomas Erlewine wrote that Demon Days "is unified and purposeful in a way Albarn's music hasn't been since The Great Escape" and "stands alongside the best Blur albums, providing a tonal touchstone for this decade the way Parklife did for the '90s." Paul Mardles of The Observer felt that, compared to Gorillaz, the songs on Demon Days were more "fully realised and pregnant with ideas", and that the album may prove to be Albarn's "masterwork". Writing in Entertainment Weekly, David Browne called it "spookier, blippier, and more on edge." Los Angeles Times critic Robert Hilburn stated that Albarn's "evocative words, compelling if understated melodic sense and subdued vocals" are at the emotional center of Demon Days, "transcending the gimmick even more than on the first Gorillaz album." Ian Wade of BBC Music described the album as "concise and enjoyable", and "a triumph for all concerned".

Rob Mitchum of Pitchfork felt that while Demon Days was uneven, Albarn's experiments "fit together just often enough to again make Gorillaz more than mere Adult Swim novelty." In a mixed assessment, Alex Mar of Rolling Stone described Demon Days as "hit-or-miss" and felt that Albarn's "phoned-in and incredibly flat" vocals weighed the record down. In contrast, Uncut stated that the album featured "great beats, brilliant production, top tunes and some of Albarn's best singing." Robert Christgau of The Village Voice gave Demon Days a three-star honourable mention, indicating "an enjoyable effort consumers attuned to its overriding aesthetic or individual vision may well treasure", and selected "All Alone" and "Dare" as highlights.

=== Accolades ===
"Feel Good Inc.", the lead single from Demon Days, won the Best Pop Collaboration with Vocals accolade at the 48th Grammy Awards. The album was nominated for British Album of the Year at the 2006 Brit Awards, but lost to Coldplay's X&Y. Demon Days won the accolade for Best International Album at 2006 Danish Music Awards and made the band win the accolade for Best Group at 2005 MTV Europe Music Awards.

Demon Days was voted the 21st best album of the year in The Village Voice's annual Pazz & Jop critics poll for 2005. The album was chosen as the tenth best album of 2005 by NME and the 2nd one for Q magazine. Glide Magazine listed the album on its Best Albums of the Decade, ranking it at 46. Spin ranked Demon Days as the fourth best album of 2005, while Mojo ranked it at number eighteen on their year-end list and hailed the album as a "genre-busting, contemporary pop milestone." NME placed it 98th on their list of 100 greatest albums of the decade. Uncut ranked it at 75 on their list of top 150 albums of the decade. Complex included it on their list of 100 Best Albums of the Complex Decade, placing it at number 43. The Guardian listed the album on its Top 50 Albums of the decade, ranking it at 11. Spin later included it in their list of The 300 Best Albums of 1985–2014. In 2016, Q ranked Demon Days as one of The Greatest Albums of the Last 30 Years. In 2020, the album was included at the 100 Best Albums of the 21st Century list of Stacker, being ranked at 27.

== Legacy ==
Despite its only modestly positive reception at release, Demon Days is now considered to have left an indelible mark on alternative music and has since been variously hailed as "iconic", "classic", "timeless" and a "modern masterpiece".

Multiple writers have noted how Demon Days' commentary was prescient for outlining social and environmental issues in the following years of the 21st century. In an eleventh-anniversary retrospective, Angus Harrison wrote for Noisey UK that while at the time the record was perceived as "corny, ranty, and hysterical," and even "pretentious twaddle," it is now viewed as "scarily prescient" and "a thrilling allegory set on the precipice of an increasingly dark stretch of modern history." In Vinyl Me, Please's Liner Notes series, Kyle Kramer called the "tormented, large-scale questions" of the album "more relevant than ever," whether in "2017 or much further down the line." John of audiosnobbery pens that "this doomsday scenario was simply viewed as a self-indulgent and pretentious move from Albarn, but, 14 years later, the messages and problems explored in Demon Days are more pertinent than ever: overpopulation, false gods, guns, violence, depression, corruption and greed. The world is not better than it was, and this is precisely why listening to Demon Days today is even more interesting than in 2005 – these are the true Demon Days." Hatim Hafid of River Beats Dance describes that "Demon Days acts as a direct societal critique on colonialism and invasion. It highlights the negative practices used to exploit countries in the name of democracy and peace", and "...Demon Days remains as one of the most politically charged pieces of the era." Tim Karan of Diffuser has called Demon Days "one of the most innovative albums of the 21st century". He also classified the album as "dense and atmospheric". Sean Craig from Mixed Frequencies said that Demon Days is "as dense as a 50-minute album can be, packed with hit after hit, feature after feature, and changes in musical style so fast that it can give you whiplash if you're not prepared for it. It's a dark, apocalyptic album that brims with energy and funk, a pop music oxymoron in every fiber of its being. It's an idiosyncrasy made manifest, something that uses sounds from every possible corner of the musical world and blends them together, in turn sounding almost entirely its own." Celebrating the 20th anniversary of the album, Ryan Leas of Stereogum said: "it didn't just establish Gorillaz as an ongoing prospect. It laid groundwork for the argument that Albarn's seeming lark could become as important, or even more so, than the generation-defining work he'd already made with Blur (...) Demon Days had a sweeping, unified aesthetic even as it veered from funky pop-rap hybrids to dubby choir refrains. (...) It was on Demon Days where Gorillaz truly became a project about end times — set in a fantasy post-apocalypse as a way to discuss the various ways humans were wrecking the world around us.(...) Though not universally lauded at the time, Demon Days’ legacy musically is arguably the broadest of anything Albarn has done. Arriving in the mid-'00s, Demon Days was one of those albums that taught us how to listen wider and wider, setting the stage for genre elision becoming the norm further into the '10s and '20s. The exact balance wouldn't ever quite be replicated. (...) In its final moments, Demon Days talks about seeking oblivion through drugs and entertainment, with a final, surging plea carried on gospel melodies: "Pick yourself up, it's a brand new day… Turn yourself around into the sun." Twenty years on, it might be harder to embrace those parting words than ever." According Michael King of Medicine Box Mag, "‍Demon Days is more than just one of the best albums from one of the most popular bands on the planet. It was a watershed moment for popular music, setting new precedents and pushing boundaries like few albums before it. (...) Demon Days helped prove that side projects can be massively successful, helped artists feel confident in switching musical styles, bridged the gap between rock and hip hop in popular music, showed what a strong media presence can do for an artist, and helped display the power of subtlety. The album has been influential for almost 20 years, and it likely will be for many more to come."

Artists including Kali Uchis, ASAP Rocky, and Trippie Redd have suggested Demon Days specifically as an influence on their work (among many others who have cited the project as a whole), with the latter saying it provides him with inspiration to create "timeless" work. Mura Masa commented how Demon Days has influenced him to invite Damon Albarn to work in his track "Blu": "...Demon Days was the first album I bought, so getting to meet up and actually work with him was crazy."

The music videos for singles from Demon Days, "Feel Good Inc.", "Dare", and "El Mañana" have amassed millions of views on YouTube; in 2011, Rolling Stone clocked "Feel Good Inc." as the 99th best song of the 2000s. In 2020, the song "Dirty Harry" trended on video-sharing platform TikTok, featured by users conceptualizing themselves as cartoon characters (referencing Gorillaz' virtual nature). The track "O Green World" was used for the announcement teaser for the 2026 film Digger starring Tom Cruise.

== Track listing ==
Demon Days – Standard edition
| No. | Title | Writer(s) | Length |
|---|---|---|---|
| 1. | "Intro" | Damon Albarn; Jamie Hewlett; Don Harper | 1:03 |
| 2. | "Last Living Souls" | Albarn; Hewlett | 3:10 |
| 3. | "Kids with Guns" | Albarn; Hewlett; Brian Burton | 3:46 |
| 4. | "O Green World" | Albarn; Hewlett; Burton | 4:32 |
| 5. | "Dirty Harry" (featuring Bootie Brown) | Albarn; Hewlett; Burton; Romye Robinson | 3:44 |
| 6. | "Feel Good Inc." (featuring De La Soul) | Albarn; Hewlett; Burton; David Jolicoeur | 3:41 |
| 7. | "El Mañana" | Albarn; Hewlett; Burton | 3:50 |
| 8. | "Every Planet We Reach Is Dead" | Albarn; Hewlett | 4:53 |
| 9. | "November Has Come" (featuring MF Doom) | Albarn; Hewlett; Daniel Dumile | 2:41 |
| 10. | "All Alone" (featuring Roots Manuva) | Albarn; Hewlett; Burton; Rodney Smith; Simon Tong | 3:30 |
| 11. | "White Light" | Albarn; Hewlett | 2:08 |
| 12. | "Dare" (featuring Shaun Ryder) | Albarn; Hewlett; Burton; Ryder | 4:04 |
| 13. | "Fire Coming Out of the Monkey's Head" | Albarn; Hewlett | 3:16 |
| 14. | "Don't Get Lost in Heaven" | Albarn; Hewlett | 2:00 |
| 15. | "Demon Days" | Albarn; Hewlett | 4:29 |
| Total length: | | | 50:47 |

== Personnel ==
Credits adapted from the liner notes of Demon Days.

=== Musicians ===
- Damon Albarn – lead vocals, keyboards, acoustic guitar, bass, synthesizers
- Danger Mouse – percussion, drum programming, sampled loops
- Jason Cox – drums, drum programming
- James Dring – drums, drum programming
- Cass Browne – drums
- Simon Tong – guitars (tracks 2, 4, 6–7, 10)
- Sally Jackson – violin (tracks 2, 5, 7–8, 10, 15)
- Stella Page – viola (tracks 2, 5, 7–8, 10, 15)
- Amanda Drummond – viola (tracks 2, 5, 7–8, 10, 15)
- Isabelle Dunn – cello (tracks 2, 5, 7–8, 10, 15)
- Al Mobbs – double bass (tracks 2, 5, 7–8, 10, 15)
- Emma Smith – double bass (tracks 2, 5, 7–8, 10, 15)
- Prabjote Osahn – violin (tracks 2, 5, 8, 10, 15)
- Neneh Cherry – additional vocals (track 3)
- Bootie Brown – vocals (track 5)
- San Fernandez Youth Chorus – choir (track 5)
- De La Soul – vocals (track 6)
- Antonia Pagulatos – violin (track 7)
- Ike Turner – piano (track 8)
- MF Doom – vocals (track 9)
- Roots Manuva – vocals (track 10)
- Martina Topley-Bird – vocals (track 10)
- Shaun Ryder – vocals (track 12)
- Rosie Wilson – vocals (track 12)
- Dennis Hopper – vocals (track 13)
- London Community Gospel Choir – choir (tracks 14–15)

=== Technical ===
- Damon Albarn – production
- Brian Burton – mixing, production
- Jason Cox – engineering, mixing, production
- James Dring – production
- Steve Sedgwick – mixing assistance
- Howie Weinberg – mastering

=== Artwork ===
- J.C. Hewlett – artwork, design
- Zombie Flesh Eaters – artwork, design

== Charts ==
=== Weekly charts ===
| Chart (2005–2006) | Peak position |
|---|---|
| Australian Albums (ARIA) | 2 |
| Australian Hip-Hop/R&B Albums (ARIA) | 1 |
| Austrian Albums (Ö3 Austria) | 3 |
| Belgian Albums (Ultratop Flanders) | 4 |
| Belgian Albums (Ultratop Wallonia) | 2 |
| Canadian Albums (Billboard) | 5 |
| Danish Albums (Hitlisten) | 3 |
| Dutch Albums (Album Top 100) | 15 |
| European Albums (Billboard) | 1 |
| Finnish Albums (Suomen virallinen lista) | 10 |
| French Albums (SNEP) | 1 |
| German Albums (Offizielle Top 100) | 2 |
| Greek Albums (IFPI) | 1 |
| Hungarian Albums (MAHASZ) | 23 |
| Icelandic Albums (Tónlist) | 5 |
| Irish Albums (IRMA) | 2 |
| Italian Albums (FIMI) | 5 |
| Japanese Albums (Oricon) | 7 |
| Mexican Albums (Top 100 Mexico) | 4 |
| New Zealand Albums (RMNZ) | 3 |
| Norwegian Albums (VG-lista) | 7 |
| Polish Albums (ZPAV) | 13 |
| Portuguese Albums (AFP) | 5 |
| Scottish Albums (Official Charts) | 1 |
| Singaporean Albums (RIAS) | 3 |
| Spanish Albums (Promusicae) | 22 |
| Swedish Albums (Sverigetopplistan) | 25 |
| Swiss Albums (Schweizer Hitparade) | 1 |
| Taiwanese Albums (Five Music) | 1 |
| UK Albums (Official Charts) | 1 |
| US Billboard 200 | 6 |
| US Top Dance Albums (Billboard) | 1 |
| US Top Rock Albums (Billboard) | 6 |

| Chart (2017) | Peak position |
|---|---|
| US Top Alternative Albums (Billboard) | 7 |
| US Top Catalog Albums (Billboard) | 12 |

| Chart (2018) | Peak position |
|---|---|
| US Indie Store Album Sales (Billboard) | 7 |
| US Vinyl Albums (Billboard) | 5 |

| Chart (2025–2026) | Peak position |
|---|---|
| Argentine Albums (CAPIF) | 1 |
| Croatian International Albums (HDU) | 10 |

=== Year-end charts ===
| Chart (2005) | Position |
|---|---|
| Australian Albums (ARIA) | 14 |
| Australian Hip Hop/R&B Albums (ARIA) | 2 |
| Austrian Albums (Ö3 Austria) | 21 |
| Belgian Albums (Ultratop Flanders) | 39 |
| Belgian Alternative Albums (Ultratop Flanders) | 29 |
| Belgian Albums (Ultratop Wallonia) | 31 |
| Danish Albums (Hitlisten) | 26 |
| Dutch Albums (Album Top 100) | 93 |
| European Albums (Billboard) | 11 |
| French Albums (SNEP) | 42 |
| German Albums (Offizielle Top 100) | 28 |
| Irish Albums (IRMA) | 13 |
| Italian Albums (FIMI) | 51 |
| Mexican Albums (Top 100 Mexico) | 64 |
| New Zealand Albums (RMNZ) | 11 |
| Swiss Albums (Schweizer Hitparade) | 31 |
| UK Albums (OCC) | 5 |
| US Billboard 200 | 41 |
| US Electronic Albums (Billboard) | 1 |
| Worldwide Albums (IFPI) | 11 |

| Chart (2006) | Position |
|---|---|
| Australian Albums (ARIA) | 46 |
| Australian Hip Hop/R&B Albums (ARIA) | 3 |
| Belgian Albums (Ultratop Flanders) | 94 |
| European Albums (Billboard) | 50 |
| French Albums (SNEP) | 106 |
| UK Albums (OCC) | 42 |
| US Billboard 200 | 67 |
| US Dance/Electronic Albums (Billboard) | 3 |

| Chart (2007) | Position |
|---|---|
| Australian Hip Hop/R&B Albums (ARIA) | 26 |
| Belgian Midprice Albums (Ultratop Flanders) | 36 |
| Belgian Midprice Albums (Ultratop Wallonia) | 34 |
| US Dance/Electronic Albums (Billboard) | 11 |

| Chart (2010) | Position |
|---|---|
| Australian Hip Hop/R&B Albums (ARIA) | 30 |

| Chart (2016) | Position |
|---|---|
| Australian Hip Hop/R&B Albums (ARIA) | 70 |

| Chart (2017) | Position |
|---|---|
| Australian Hip Hop/R&B Albums (ARIA) | 86 |
| Mexican Albums (Top 100 Mexico) | 86 |
| US Dance/Electronic Albums (Billboard) | 7 |

| Chart (2018) | Position |
|---|---|
| Mexican Albums (Top 100 Mexico) | 66 |
| US Dance/Electronic Albums (Billboard) | 7 |

| Chart (2019) | Position |
|---|---|
| Mexican Albums (Top 100 Mexico) | 96 |
| US Dance/Electronic Albums (Billboard) | 13 |

| Chart (2020) | Position |
|---|---|
| US Dance/Electronic Albums (Billboard) | 13 |

| Chart (2021) | Position |
|---|---|
| US Dance/Electronic Albums (Billboard) | 4 |

| Chart (2022) | Position |
|---|---|
| US Dance/Electronic Albums (Billboard) | 3 |

| Chart (2023) | Position |
|---|---|
| US Dance/Electronic Albums (Billboard) | 6 |

| Chart (2024) | Position |
|---|---|
| US Dance/Electronic Albums (Billboard) | 7 |

| Chart (2025) | Position |
|---|---|
| US Dance/Electronic Albums (Billboard) | 5 |

=== Decade-end charts ===
| Chart (2000–09) | Position |
|---|---|
| Australian Albums (ARIA) | 90 |
| UK Albums (OCC) | 45 |
| US Dance/Electronic Albums (Billboard) | 1 |

| Chart (2010–19) | Position |
|---|---|
| US Dance/Electronic Albums (Billboard) | 37 |

== Certifications ==
| Region | Certification | Certified units/sales |
|---|---|---|
| Argentina (CAPIF) | Gold | 20,000^{^} |
| Australia (ARIA) | 3× Platinum | 210,000^{^} |
| Austria (IFPI Austria) | Platinum | 30,000^{*} |
| Canada (Music Canada) | 2× Platinum | 200,000^{‡} |
| Denmark (IFPI Danmark) | 4× Platinum | 80,000^{‡} |
| France (SNEP) | Platinum | 200,000^{*} |
| Germany (BVMI) | 3× Gold | 300,000^{‡} |
| Ireland (IRMA) | 5× Platinum | 75,000^{^} |
| Italy (FIMI) sales since 2009 | Platinum | 50,000^{‡} |
| Japan (RIAJ) | Gold | 100,000^{^} |
| Mexico (AMPROFON) | Gold | 50,000^{^} |
| New Zealand (RMNZ) | 6× Platinum | 90,000^{‡} |
| Poland (ZPAV) | Platinum | 20,000^{‡} |
| Portugal (AFP) | Platinum | 20,000^{^} |
| Russia (NFPF) | Gold | 10,000^{*} |
| Switzerland (IFPI Switzerland) | Gold | 20,000^{^} |
| United Kingdom (BPI) | 6× Platinum | 2,053,211 |
| United States (RIAA) | 2× Platinum | 2,200,000 |
Summaries
| Europe (IFPI) | 2× Platinum | 2,000,000^{*} |
| Worldwide | — | 8,000,000 |
^{*} Sales figures based on certification alone.^{^} Shipments figures based on certification alone.^{‡} Sales+streaming figures based on certification alone.

== See also ==
- List of best-selling albums of the 2000s (decade) in the United Kingdom
