= Kids with Guns =

2006 single by Gorillaz

Single by Gorillaz featuring Neneh Cherry

from the album Demon Days
- A-side: "El Mañana"
- Released: 10 April 2006
- Genre: Alternative rock; electronic; new wave
- Length: 3:45
- Label: Parlophone
- Songwriter(s): Damon Albarn
- Producer(s): Gorillaz; Danger Mouse; Jason Cox; James Dring

Gorillaz featuring Neneh Cherry singles chronology
"Dirty Harry" (2005)	"Kids with Guns" / "El Mañana" (2006)	"Stylo" (2010)

Alternate covers
- Double A-side cover

Music video
- "Kids With Guns" on YouTube

"Kids with Guns" is a song from the British virtual band Gorillaz' second album, Demon Days (2005). It was released on 10 April 2006 in the United Kingdom as a double A-side as the fourth and final singles from the album. "Kids with Guns" and its other A-side "El Mañana", reached number 27 upon its release in the United Kingdom, a significantly lower position than its predecessors.

"Kids with Guns" features Neneh Cherry on guest vocals. A remix by Hot Chip was included on the release of The Inbetweeners Soundtrack in 2009.

== Overview ==
"Kids with Guns" was inspired by a child at Damon Albarn's daughter's school, who had arrived one day with a knife. Albarn said, "A nice boy just decided to pick up a knife and show it to his friends at lunchtime. It's a very real problem, but I'm not treating it as a problem. It's part of the brutalization of a generation that's going on at the moment."

== Music video ==
Although "Kids with Guns" does not have an official promo video, live visuals were shown during the Demon Days Live show at Manchester Opera House in November 2005. The visuals are a slideshow of guns, appearing in red, white and black. Sometimes a "23 mm" sign or a slide of the guns is positioned to make a windmill, representing Noodle's floating island.

On The Singles Collection DVD, the video used for the song was the live performance from Demon Days Live at the Manchester Opera House.

== Track listings ==
UK CD single

1. "Kids with Guns" – 3:45
2. "El Mañana" – 3:50
3. "Stop the Dams" – 5:39

UK DVD single

1. "El Mañana" (music video) – 3:54
2. "Kids with Guns" (music video) – 3:46
3. "Don't Get Lost in Heaven" (Original Demo Version) – 2:29
4. "El Mañana" (animatic) – 3:57

UK 7-inch single

1. "Kids with Guns" – 3:45
2. "El Mañana" – 3:50

European CD single

1. "Kids with Guns" – 3:45
2. "El Mañana" – 3:50
3. "Stop the Dams" – 5:39
4. "El Mañana" (music video) – 3:54

Japanese CD single

1. "El Mañana" – 3:50
2. "Kids with Guns" – 3:45
3. "Stop the Dams" – 5:39
4. "Don't Get Lost in Heaven" (Original Demo Version) – 2:29
5. "El Mañana" (music video) – 3:54

US digital single

1. "El Mañana" – 3:50
2. "Hong Kong" (Live in Manchester) – 6:36

US digital E.P.

1. "El Mañana" – 3:50
2. "Stop the Dams" – 5:39
3. "Hong Kong" (Live in Manchester) – 6:36
4. "Kids with Guns" (music video) – 3:46
5. "El Mañana" (Live in Harlem video) – 3:59

== Personnel ==
- Damon Albarn – vocals, guitars, keyboards
- Neneh Cherry – additional vocals
- Danger Mouse – drum programming, mixing
- James Dring – drums, drum programming
- Jason Cox – mixing, engineering
- Steve Sedgwick – mixing assistance
- Howie Weinberg – mastering

== Charts ==
Chart (2006)	Peak position
Australia (ARIA)	31
Germany (GfK)	94
Ireland (IRMA)	39
Italy (FIMI)	33
Scotland (OCC)	17
UK Singles (OCC)	27

== Certifications ==
Region	Certification	Certified units/sales
New Zealand (RMNZ)	Gold	15,000^{‡}
United Kingdom (BPI)	Silver	200,000^{‡}
^{‡} Sales+streaming figures based on certification alone.

== Release history ==
Region	Date	Format(s)	Label(s)	Ref.
United Kingdom	10 April 2006	7-inch vinyl; CD; DVD	Parlophone	
Australia	8 May 2006	CD	Parlophone	
