= El Mañana (song) =

2006 single by Gorillaz

Single by Gorillaz

from the album Demon Days
- A-side: "Kids with Guns"
- Released: 10 April 2006
- Genre: Trip hop; dub
- Length: 3:50
- Label: Parlophone
- Songwriter: Damon Albarn
- Producers: Gorillaz; Danger Mouse; Jason Cox; James Dring

Gorillaz singles chronology
"Dirty Harry" (2005)	"Kids with Guns" / "El Mañana" (2006)	"Stylo" (2010)

Alternate covers
- Double A-side cover

Music video
- "El Mañana" on YouTube

"El Mañana" (Spanish for "The Tomorrow" or "The Future") is a song by British band Gorillaz. It was released on 10 April 2006 in the United Kingdom as a double A-side, and the fourth and final single from their album Demon Days. "El Mañana", along with its other A-side "Kids with Guns", reached number 27 upon its release in the UK.

The song's music video brings back certain elements from the band's music video for "Feel Good Inc.", released the year before.

== Music video ==
The animated music video for "El Mañana" was released on 11 March 2006 from Passion Pictures, and directed by Jamie Hewlett and Pete Candeland. The video opens to Noodle on the same floating island seen in the music video for "Feel Good Inc." Two helicopters, similar in design to the RAH-66 Comanche and the Bell AH-1Z Viper, intercept the island. The helicopters spot Noodle out in the open, and open fire upon her with rotary cannons, but fail to hit her. Noodle flees into the cover of the windmill, narrowly avoiding the rounds which penetrate the walls. The two helicopters smash into the windmill's sails, destroying them. The helicopters continue to strafe the floating island, setting fire to the foliage and the windmill. Noodle stumbles outside as the helicopters appear to break off and fly away, but is spotted. The helicopters turn around and strafe Noodle, but she again narrowly escapes the incoming fire, taking refuge in the burning windmill. The island, now heavily damaged, plunges into a canyon below. The camera pans up and away as the island crashes into the ground, exploding. Above the crash zone, both helicopters hover. One of the helicopters opens its bomb bay doors, and drops an unguided bomb into the wreckage. The helicopters disengage, and the video fades to black.

== Track listings ==
UK CD single

1. "Kids with Guns" – 3:45
2. "El Mañana" – 3:50
3. "Stop the Dams" – 5:39

UK DVD single

1. "El Mañana" (music video) – 4:03
2. "Kids with Guns" (music video) – 3:46
3. "Don't Get Lost in Heaven" (Original Demo Version) – 2:29
4. "El Mañana" (animatic) – 3:57

UK 7-inch single

1. "Kids with Guns" – 3:45
2. "El Mañana" – 3:50

European CD single

1. "Kids with Guns" – 3:45
2. "El Mañana" – 3:50
3. "Stop the Dams" – 5:39
4. "El Mañana" (music video) – 4:03

Japanese CD single

1. "El Mañana" – 3:50
2. "Kids with Guns" – 3:45
3. "Stop the Dams" – 5:39
4. "Don't Get Lost in Heaven" (Original Demo Version) – 2:29
5. "El Mañana" (music video) – 4:03

UK digital single

1. "Kids with Guns" (Hot Chip Remix) – 7:09

US digital single

1. "El Mañana" – 3:50
2. "Hong Kong" (Live in Manchester) – 6:36

US digital E.P.

1. "El Mañana" – 3:50
2. "Stop the Dams" – 5:39
3. "Hong Kong" (Live in Manchester) – 6:36
4. "Kids with Guns" (music video) – 3:46
5. "El Mañana" (Live in Harlem video) – 3:59

== Personnel ==
- Damon Albarn – vocals, synthesizers, electric guitar, string arrangements
- Simon Tong – acoustic guitar
- Al Mobbs – double bass
- Emma Smith – double bass
- Amanda Drummond – viola
- Stella Page – viola
- Antonia Pagulatos – violin
- Sally Jackson – violin
- Isabelle Dunn – cello
- Danger Mouse – drum programming, mixing
- Jason Cox – mixing, engineering
- Steve Sedgwick – mixing assistance
- James Dring – drum programming
- Howie Weinberg – mastering

== Charts ==
Chart (2006)	Peak position
Australia (ARIA)	31
Germany (GfK)	94
Ireland (IRMA)	39
Italy (FIMI)	33
Scottish Singles Sales (Official Charts)	17
UK Singles (Official Charts)	27

== Certifications ==
Region	Certification	Certified units/sales
United Kingdom (BPI)	Silver	200,000^{‡}
^{‡} Sales+streaming figures based on certification alone.

== Release history ==
Region	Date	Format(s)	Label(s)	Ref.
United Kingdom	10 April 2006	7-inch vinyl; CD; DVD	Parlophone	
Australia	8 May 2006	CD	Parlophone	
