= Feel Good Inc. =

2005 single by Gorillaz featuring De La Soul

Single by Gorillaz featuring De La Soul

from the album Demon Days
- B-side: "Spitting Out the Demons"; "Bill Murray"; "68 State"; "Murdoc Is God"
- Released: 9 May 2005
- Studio: Kong (Essex, England); 13 (London, England)
- Genre: Alternative rock; hip-hop; rap rock; funk rock
- Length: 3:42 (album version); 3:28 (radio edit)
- Label: Parlophone; Virgin
- Songwriters: Gorillaz; David Jolicoeur
- Producers: Gorillaz; Danger Mouse; Jason Cox; James Dring

Gorillaz singles chronology
| "Lil' Dub Chefin'" (2002) | "Feel Good Inc." (2005) | "Dare" (2005) |

De La Soul singles chronology
| "Rock Co.Kane Flow" (2004) | "Feel Good Inc." (2005) | "Thou Shalt Always Kill" (2009) |

Music video
- "Feel Good Inc." on YouTube

"Feel Good Inc." is a song by British virtual band Gorillaz featuring American hip-hop group De La Soul. Released on 9 May 2005 as the lead single from the band's second studio album, Demon Days, the single peaked at No.2 in the United Kingdom and No.14 in the United States, topping the US Billboard Modern Rock Tracks chart for eight consecutive weeks and appearing on the Billboard Hot 100 year-end rankings for both 2005 and 2006. The song peaked within the top 10 in 16 countries, reaching No.1 in Spain, Poland and Greece. The song has been certified eight-times platinum in New Zealand, five-times platinum in Canada, and five-times platinum in the United Kingdom.

The song was listed in Pitchfork Media and Rolling Stone's Best Songs of the 2000s. "Feel Good Inc." was nominated for three Grammys at the 48th Annual Grammy Awards in 2006, including Record of the Year, ultimately winning for Best Pop Collaboration. Popdose ranked it 26th on their list of 100 best songs of the decade.

== Chart performance ==
The song entered the UK singles chart at number 22 on 17 April 2005, the first week that legal downloads were included. As the rules required a physical release in order to be eligible for the chart, a limited edition of 300 picture discs were issued; on physical sales alone, the song would have entered at number 197. Jason King and Joel Ross, at the time the co-hosts of The Official Chart, praised Gorillaz' use of the loophole as "guerrilla tactics". After its full release, the song jumped to number two on 16 May 2005.

== Writing ==
Damon Albarn wrote "Feel Good Inc." on the way to perform at Coachella with Blur in 2003. It was the first time he had been through the "amazing windmill valley", as Albarn recalls it, which inspired the song's chorus "windmill, windmill for the land".

De La Soul, who were finishing up The Grind Date, were linked through a few mutual connections with Gorillaz. Having known of their song "Clint Eastwood" with Del the Funky Homosapien, they agreed to collaborating. Albarn had sent De La Soul member Kelvin Mercer a few tracks; Kelvin liked "Kids with Guns", which would go onto to feature Neneh Cherry in the final version. Kelvin and fellow De La Soul member, David Jolicoeur, would write a few rhymes to "Kids with Guns" before flying to London. On the second day of recording, after working on "Kids with Guns", Albarn showed David the instrumental to "Feel Good Inc.", which David loved and wanted to perform on. With the song being worked on with De La Soul in the summer of 2004, and a hand in date of November, Damon wanted Kelvin to write a verse while David was writing his, but Kelvin wanted to contribute to it later, since he was busy working on the De La Soul song "Shopping Bags (She Got from You)" around the same time; he ultimately did not perform on "Feel Good Inc." According to Kelvin, David's verse was written the night after hearing "Feel Good Inc." for the first time.

The laugh featured in the song was performed by De La Soul member Vincent Mason, who, according to Albarn, was just "laughing at the music that was happening that today". It was David's idea to have Vincent's laugh on the track. Vincent also worked with Albarn with some extra production during De La Soul's stay in the studio.

According to Noodle, the song started out as an upbeat 80s track. Eventually she moved towards a more acoustic sound. The windmill imagery was partly inspired by the poem "And did those feet in ancient time" by William Blake. They also represent a "note of optimism, a reminder of a simpler time. Like maybe, a snapshot of an older world, more innocent."

I had the main tune, the bit that 2-D sings. But I'd left a big space for where a rapper would do their part. It was Danger Mouse that originally suggested De La Soul. He was good friends with them and sent them the track and they agreed to fly over. Although at first when they arrived they were just messing around, trying to make each other laugh. Fortunately, we recorded most of that, and that's how we got the crazy-sounding laugh that you hear on the track. The whole thing worked amazingly, but most of it was an accident.

— Noodle

The production on 2-D's vocals reflect that sensibility "like an image beaming at you from the past… a ghost of a memory."

== Music video ==
=== Background ===
The main themes of the "Feel Good Inc." video are intellectual freedom and the media's dumbing down of mass culture. Jamie Hewlett said in an interview that some scenes in the video were inspired by Hayao Miyazaki, specifically the windmill-powered landmass, which has been compared to the flying island of Laputa from Miyazaki's 1986 film Castle in the Sky. On 26 April 2022, the video was re-uploaded to the Gorillaz YouTube channel with commentary from virtual band member Murdoc Niccals. The music video was filmed in February 2005.

=== Synopsis ===
At the beginning of the video, the camera rises up to the top of the Feel Good Inc. tower, and a sample of the Spacemonkeyz dub of "Clint Eastwood", entitled "A Fistful of Peanuts", can be heard. The camera focuses into the tower, where 2-D yearns for the freedom to join Noodle on her floating island. The characters lying on the floor represent those who have already been "dumbed down", while the band members are the ones who have awakened. 2-D attempts to awaken all the people lying on the floor from their half-dead state by yelling at them through his megaphone, in the style of a political activist. Ominous helicopters, which closely resemble Korean War-era Bell H-13s, chase the floating island, monitoring the behaviour inside and ensuring that no one escapes. It is unclear whether they are preventing Noodle's escape or are chasing her away.

Back in the tower, De La Soul appear as larger-than life, seemingly omnipotent images on surrounding television screens, taunting the Gorillaz band members and driving 2-D into a wild, hypnotic frenzy as he tries to resist the urge to be dumbed down. At the end of the video, 2-D, beaten by his surroundings, returns to the state he was in when the video began, repeating the words "feel good" until the video finally ends, in an exact reversal of the intro. The repetition of "feel good" represents that 2-D is convincing himself that everything is okay (as if he is brainwashing himself to believe it), instead of confronting the harsh truth of the situation. The music video for "El Mañana" continues the narrative, depicting two helicopter gunships catching up to Noodle's floating windmill island.

== Awards and nominations ==
=== Awards ===
- 2005 MTV Video Music Awards
  - Breakthrough Video
  - Best Special Effects in a Video
- 2006 Grammy Awards
  - Best Pop Collaboration with Vocals

=== Nominations ===
- 2006 Grammy Awards
  - Record of the Year
  - Best Short Form Music Video

== Formats and track listings ==
Australian, European and UK 2-track CD single

1. "Feel Good Inc." – 3:42
2. "Spitting Out the Demons" – 5:10

European CD maxi-single

1. "Feel Good Inc." – 3:42
2. "Spitting Out the Demons" – 5:10
3. "Bill Murray" – 3:51
4. "Feel Good Inc." (video) – 4:13

Japanese CD EP

1. "Feel Good Inc." – 3:42
2. "Spitting Out the Demons" – 5:10
3. "Bill Murray" – 3:51
4. "Murdoc Is God" – 2:26
5. "Feel Good Inc." (video) – 4:13

European and UK DVD single

1. "Feel Good Inc." (video) – 4:13
2. "Spitting Out the Demons" – 5:10
3. "Bill Murray" – 3:51

European and UK 7-inch picture disc

A. "Feel Good Inc." – 3:42
B. "68 State" – 4:48

European digital single 1

1. "Feel Good Inc." (instrumental) – 3:42

European digital single 2

1. "Feel Good Inc." – 2:49
2. "68 State" – 4:48

US digital EP

1. "Feel Good Inc." – 3:42
2. "Spitting Out the Demons" – 5:09
3. "Bill Murray" – 3:52
4. "Dare" featuring Shaun Ryder (Soulwax remix) – 5:44

== Credits and personnel ==
Credits are lifted from the European CD single and Demon Days liner notes.

Studios

- Recorded at Kong Studios (Essex, England) and 13 (London, England)
- Mixed at Pierce Rooms (London, England)
- Mastered at Masterdisk (New York City, United States)

Song personnel

- Gorillaz – writing, production, mixing
- De La Soul – featured vocals
  - David Jolicoeur – writing
- Simon Tong – additional guitar
- Danger Mouse – production, mixing, programming
- Jason Cox – additional production, mixing, engineering
- James Dring – additional production, programming
- Howie Weinberg – mastering
- Jamie Hewlett J.C. Hewlett – artwork and design
- Zombie Flesh Eaters – artwork and design

Video personnel

- Jamie Hewlett – director
- Pete Candeland – director
- Passion Pictures – production
- Rushes – post production
- Chu-Li Shewring – sound design
- Sebastian Monk – sound design

== Charts ==
=== Weekly charts ===
2005–2006 weekly chart performance for "Feel Good Inc."
| Chart (2005–2006) | Peak position |
|---|---|
| Australia (ARIA) | 3 |
| Australian Urban (ARIA) | 2 |
| Austria (Ö3 Austria Top 40) | 4 |
| Belgium (Ultratip Bubbling Under Flanders) | 2 |
| Belgium (Ultratop 50 Wallonia) | 36 |
| Canada (Nielsen SoundScan) | 6 |
| Canada CHR/Pop Top 30 (Radio & Records) | 13 |
| Canada Hot AC Top 40 (Radio & Records) | 22 |
| Canada Rock Top 30 (Radio & Records) | 26 |
| CIS Airplay (TopHit) | 7 |
| Czech Republic (IFPI) | 5 |
| Denmark (Tracklisten) | 19 |
| Europe (Eurochart Hot 100) | 2 |
| Finland (Suomen virallinen lista) | 4 |
| France (SNEP) | 26 |
| Germany (GfK) | 8 |
| Greece (IFPI) | 1 |
| Hungary (Rádiós Top 40) | 27 |
| Hungary (Dance Top 40) | 28 |
| Hungary (Single Top 40) | 7 |
| Iceland (Tónlist) | 3 |
| Ireland (IRMA) | 4 |
| Ireland Dance (IRMA) | 1 |
| Italy (FIMI) | 5 |
| Netherlands (Dutch Top 40 Tipparade) | 20 |
| Netherlands (Single Top 100) | 87 |
| New Zealand (Recorded Music NZ) | 2 |
| Norway (VG-lista) | 4 |
| Polish Airplay Top 100 (ZPAV) | 1 |
| Russia Airplay (TopHit) | 12 |
| Scottish Singles Sales (Official Charts) | 2 |
| Spain (Promusicae) | 1 |
| Sweden (Sverigetopplistan) | 14 |
| Switzerland (Schweizer Hitparade) | 12 |
| UK Singles (Official Charts) | 2 |
| US Billboard Hot 100 | 14 |
| US Adult Pop Airplay (Billboard) | 18 |
| US Alternative Airplay (Billboard) | 1 |
| US Dance Airplay (Billboard) | 4 |
| US Pop Airplay (Billboard) | 13 |

2025–2026 weekly chart performance for "Feel Good Inc."
| Chart (2025–2026) | Peak position |
|---|---|
| Global 200 (Billboard) | 57 |
| Greece International (IFPI) | 54 |
| Ireland (IRMA) | 26 |
| Portugal (AFP) | 100 |
| UK Singles (Official Charts) | 22 |
| US Hot Rock & Alternative Songs (Billboard) | 11 |

=== Year-end charts ===
2005 year-end chart performance for "Feel Good Inc."
| Chart (2005) | Position |
|---|---|
| Australia (ARIA) | 9 |
| Australian Urban (ARIA) | 6 |
| Austria (Ö3 Austria Top 40) | 25 |
| CIS Airplay (TopHit) | 36 |
| Europe (Eurochart Hot 100) | 20 |
| Germany (Media Control GfK) | 43 |
| Italy (FIMI) | 45 |
| New Zealand (RIANZ) | 18 |
| Russia Airplay (TopHit) | 27 |
| Sweden (Hitlistan) | 100 |
| Switzerland (Schweizer Hitparade) | 71 |
| UK Singles (OCC) | 14 |
| US Billboard Hot 100 | 37 |
| US Adult Top 40 (Billboard) | 72 |
| US Hot Dance Airplay (Billboard) | 28 |
| US Mainstream Top 40 (Billboard) | 66 |
| US Modern Rock Tracks (Billboard) | 4 |
| Venezuela Pop Rock (Record Report) | 4 |

2006 year-end chart performance for "Feel Good Inc."
| Chart (2006) | Position |
|---|---|
| US Billboard Hot 100 | 97 |

2025 year-end chart performance for "Feel Good Inc."
| Chart (2025) | Position |
|---|---|
| Global 200 (Billboard) | 137 |
| UK Singles (OCC) | 92 |

=== Decade-end charts ===
Decade-end chart performance for "Feel Good Inc"
| Chart (2000–2009) | Position |
|---|---|
| US Hot Alternative Songs (Billboard) | 18 |

== Certifications ==
Certifications for "Feel Good Inc."
| Region | Certification | Certified units/sales |
|---|---|---|
| Australia (ARIA) | Platinum | 70,000^{^} |
| Canada (Music Canada) | 5× Platinum | 400,000^{‡} |
| Denmark (IFPI Danmark) | 2× Platinum | 180,000^{‡} |
| Germany (BVMI) | 3× Gold | 450,000^{‡} |
| Italy (FIMI) sales since 2009 | Platinum | 50,000^{‡} |
| New Zealand (RMNZ) | 8× Platinum | 240,000^{‡} |
| Portugal (AFP) | 3× Platinum | 30,000^{‡} |
| Spain (Promusicae) | Platinum | 60,000^{‡} |
| United Kingdom (BPI) | 5× Platinum | 3,000,000^{‡} |
| United States (RIAA) Mastertone | Gold | 500,000^{^} |
| United States Digital | — | 2,924,479 |
Streaming
| Greece (IFPI Greece) | 2× Platinum | 4,000,000^{†} |
^{^} Shipments figures based on certification alone.^{‡} Sales+streaming figures based on certification alone.^{†} Streaming-only figures based on certification alone.

== Release history ==
Release dates and formats for "Feel Good Inc."
| Region | Date | Format(s) | Label(s) | Ref. |
|---|---|---|---|---|
| United States | 4 April 2005 | Alternative radio | Virgin | |
| United States | 9 May 2005 | Digital download | Virgin | |
| Australia | 9 May 2005 | CD | Parlophone | |
| United Kingdom | 9 May 2005 | 7-inch vinyl; CD; DVD | Parlophone | |
| United States | 17 May 2005 | Contemporary hit radio | Virgin | |
