= Dirty Harry (song) =

2005 single by Gorillaz

Single by Gorillaz featuring Bootie Brown

from the album Demon Days
- B-side: "Hongkongaton"; "All Alone" (live)
- Released: 21 November 2005
- Genre: Funk; hip hop
- Length: 3:50 (album version); 2:42 (radio edit)
- Label: Parlophone
- Songwriters: Damon Albarn; Romye Robinson
- Producers: Gorillaz; Danger Mouse; James Dring; Jason Cox

Gorillaz singles chronology
"Dare" (2005)	"Dirty Harry" (2005)	"Kids with Guns" / "El Mañana" (2006)

Bootie Brown singles chronology
"Dirty Harry" (2005)	"New Gold" (2022)

Music video
- "Dirty Harry" on YouTube

"Dirty Harry" is a song by British alternative rock virtual band Gorillaz, featuring Bootie Brown, from their second studio album, Demon Days (2005). "Dirty Harry" peaked at number six on the UK Singles Chart, and number fifteen on the ARIA Singles Chart.

== Song history ==
"Dirty Harry" was first released as a promotional single on iTunes before being released as the third single from the album on 21 November 2005, peaking at number six in the United Kingdom. An early version entitled "I Need a Gun" was included on Damon Albarn's album Democrazy. In 2006, the song was nominated for "Best Urban/Alternative Performance" at the 48th Annual Grammy Awards. It became Gorillaz' 3rd consecutive top 10 hit and last song to make it on the top 10 to this date.

== Music video ==
The video was released on 25 October 2005, sent to those on the e-mail list on Gorillaz' official website. A thematic follow-up to the band's "Clint Eastwood", it refers to the film of the same name, Clint Eastwood being the lead actor in the movie. "Dirty Harry" was the first Gorillaz music video to be shot on location, with filming taking place in the Namib Desert in Namibia. The group had initially planned to use a computer-animated desert, but found it more practical and cost-effective to film in a real one.

The video mainly features 2-D and an animated version of the San Fernando Valley Youth Chorus stranded in the desert, following what appears to have been a helicopter crash. The survivors keep themselves entertained with the song while awaiting the arrival of rescuers, portrayed by Noodle and Murdoc crewing a Windhoeker Maschinenfabrik Wer’wolf MKII mine-proof vehicle driven by Russel. Bootie Brown appears in the video, leaping out of a sand dune in military fatigues to perform his verse of the song. The video concludes with Gorillaz, the children, and Bootie Brown departing the crash site in the Wer'wolf, which breaks down a short distance away.

== Track listings ==
UK CD1 and digital download 1

1. "Dirty Harry" – 3:52
2. "All Alone" (live) – 3:39

UK CD2 and digital download 2

1. "Dirty Harry" (single edit) – 3:51
2. "Hongkongaton" – 3:33
3. "Dirty Harry" (Chopper remix) – 3:40

UK DVD single

1. "Dirty Harry" (video) – 5:00
2. "Murdoc Is God" – 2:26
3. "Dirty Harry" (animatic with "Dirty Harry" instrumental) – 4:21

European and Australian CD single

1. "Dirty Harry" – 3:50
2. "Dirty Harry" (Chopper remix) – 3:40
3. "Hongkongaton" – 3:35
4. "Dirty Harry" (music video) – 5:00
5. "Dirty Harry" (animatic with "Dirty Harry" instrumental) – 4:21

Japanese CD single

1. "Dirty Harry" – 3:50
2. "All Alone" (live) – 3:40
3. "Hongkongaton" – 3:35
4. "Dirty Harry" (Chopper remix) – 3:40
5. "Dirty Harry" (video) – 5:00

== Personnel ==
- Damon Albarn – vocals, synthesizers, guitars, string arrangements
- Bootie Brown – vocals
- Jason Cox – mixing, engineering
- James Dring – drum programming
- Al Mobbs – double bass
- Emma Smith – double bass
- Amanda Drummond – viola
- Stella Page – viola
- Prabjote Osahn – violin
- Sally Jackson – violin
- Isabelle Dunn – cello
- Danger Mouse – sampled loops, percussion, drum programming, mixing
- Howie Weinberg – mastering
- Steve Sedgwick – mixing assistance
- The San Fernandez Youth Chorus – additional vocals

== Charts ==
=== Weekly charts ===
Chart (2005–2006)	Peak position
Australia (ARIA)	15
Australian Urban (ARIA)	5
Austria (Ö3 Austria Top 40)	69
Belgium (Ultratip Bubbling Under Flanders)	8
Belgium (Ultratip Bubbling Under Wallonia)	15
Czech Republic Airplay (ČNS IFPI)	43
Denmark (Tracklisten)	20
Germany (GfK)	77
Ireland (IRMA)	19
Italy (FIMI)	26
Netherlands (Single Top 100)	100
Scottish Singles Sales (Official Charts)	7
Switzerland (Schweizer Hitparade)	88
UK Singles (Official Charts)	6

=== Year-end charts ===
Chart (2005)	Position
UK Singles (OCC)	105

Chart (2006)	Position
Australian Urban (ARIA)	29
Lebanon (Airplay Top 100)	71
UK Singles (OCC)	191

== Certifications ==
Region	Certification	Certified units/sales
New Zealand (RMNZ)	Platinum	30,000^{‡}
United Kingdom (BPI)	Platinum	600,000^{‡}
^{‡} Sales+streaming figures based on certification alone.

== Release history ==
Region	Date	Format(s)	Label(s)	Ref(s).
United Kingdom	21 November 2005	CD; DVD; digital download	Parlophone	
Japan	7 December 2005	CD	Parlophone	
Australia	16 January 2006	CD	Parlophone	

== See also ==
- List of anti-war songs
