= Dare (song) =

2005 single by Gorillaz

Single by Gorillaz

from the album Demon Days
- B-side: "Samba at 13"; "People"; "Highway (Under Construction)"
- Released: 29 August 2005
- Studio: Sarm West (London, England)
- Genre: Funk; electropop; disco; trip hop; alternative rock
- Length: 4:05 (album version); 3:33 (radio edit)
- Label: Parlophone; Virgin
- Songwriters: Damon Albarn; Jamie Hewlett; Brian Burton
- Producers: Danger Mouse; Jason Cox; James Dring

Gorillaz singles chronology
"Feel Good Inc." (2005)	"Dare" (2005)	"Dirty Harry" (2005)

Shaun Ryder singles chronology
"Dare" (2005)

Music video
- "Dare" on YouTube

"Dare" (stylised as "DARE" and "挑戦 (DARE)") is a song by the English virtual band Gorillaz and is the second single from their second studio album, Demon Days (2005). The track includes vocals by Happy Mondays and Black Grape frontman Shaun Ryder, and is sung by Rosie Wilson (also known as Roses Gabor) as Noodle, with backing vocals from Damon Albarn. It peaked at number one on the UK singles chart in September 2005, becoming the band's only UK number one. "Dare" peaked at number 11 in Australia and Italy. It also reached the top 10 in the Commonwealth of Independent States (CIS), Iceland, Ireland, Poland, and New Zealand.

== Background and release ==
The CD single of "Dare" was released in the United Kingdom on 29 August 2005. It reached number one in the United Kingdom on 4 September 2005. In the US, it peaked at number 87 on the Billboard Hot 100 on 14 January 2006 and at number eight on the Modern Rock Tracks chart on 4 March 2006.

For this song, English vocalist Roses Gabor (birth name Rosemary "Rosie" Wilson) took over the role of Noodle from Miho Hatori, who had previously sung as the character on the first Gorillaz studio album.

Chris Evans stated at the 2006 Brit Awards that the song was initially called "It's There", but the title was changed due to Shaun Ryder's Mancunian accent making the phrase sound like "it's dare". In a 2017 interview with Chris Moyles on Radio X, Ryder claimed that it was him requesting a change to his headphone level, "it's going up, it's going up, it's there!" and that originally there was no title to the track at all. In August 2019, Ryder told NME that the claim about the title being changed because of his accent was "an urban myth":

Don't forget, I'm dyslexic and I've been writing in text since I was fuckin' four years old. R u ok? B4. It's der! Now we're all finally coming around to how I've been fuckin' writing all my life!

In 2016, vocals of the song were interpolated in Friction's song "Dare (Hold It Down)". In 2017, the song was featured in an episode of the British soap opera EastEnders. The song was also featured in the video game Just Dance (2009).

== Music video ==
In the music video for "Dare," Noodle and Shaun Ryder are the main focus, with Ryder portrayed as a giant, disembodied head that is kept alive by machinery in Noodle's closet. They are shown performing the song, while Russel reads the newspaper on a toilet directly below and 2-D listens into the room by pressing his ear to the floor. As the video draws to a close, Ryder awakens in a bed, apparently having dreamt up the entire sequence. A voice beside him growls, "Go back to sleep, honey," and Murdoc is revealed to be the speaker; a few seconds after this scene, Murdoc is shown to be waking up in his own bed, albeit seemingly shaken up and gasping for air. The music video filmed in June 2005.

In the commentary, Noodle claims that Murdoc initially protested her doing the entire video by herself, but she countered that she wrote the song and she had seen him show off too much in the "Feel Good Inc." music video. Additionally, Noodle adds that Murdoc was asleep in his Winnebago for the entirety of the shoot up until the final scene.

The video was directed by Jamie Hewlett and Pete Candeland. The video was leaked a few days prior to its 17 July 2005 release on the official Gorillaz website. The video was later recalled from other websites and the final scene was tweaked slightly; Murdoc's Confederate Naval Jack flag was replaced with that of the Jolly Roger. (The version with the Naval Jack is played in some countries, including Canada.) The video had its first UK play on Channel 4 on 16 July 2005 at 11.45pm, just hours before its release online.

This video calls back to classic horror movies. In the very beginning of the video the Gorillaz' 'reject false icons' statue is shown, which is Pazuzu, the figurine from The Exorcist (1973) and son of the devil. Crows are flying around the building, in a tribute to Alfred Hitchcock's The Birds (1963). Shaun Ryder is depicted as a Frankenstein-like monster who is brought to life as the music begins. Amongst the contraptions that are part of the life-support system appear to be two Atari joysticks and a Speak & Spell from the early 1980s. Ryder's head being kept alive is a reference to the movie The Brain That Wouldn't Die (1962). The tube attached to Ryder's cheek switches from side to side as a tribute to the goofs commonly made in early horror movies. When we see Russel sitting on the toilet, he is holding a newspaper with a headline that reads CANNIBAL MASSAKREN, the Danish title of Cannibal Holocaust (1980). The zoom on Noodle's eye at the end of the video is taken directly from Ring (1998) and its American remake, The Ring (2002).

== Track listings ==
UK CD1

1. "Dare" – 4:05
2. "Clint Eastwood" (live) – 4:31

UK CD2

1. "Dare" – 4:05
2. "Highway (Under Construction)" – 4:17
3. "Dare" (Soulwax remix) – 5:48

UK DVD single

1. "Dare" (music video) – 4:47
2. "Samba at 13" – 6:24
3. "People" – 3:28
4. "Dare" (animatic) – 4:20

UK digital single

1. "Dare" (DFA remix) – 12:14

European CD maxi-single

1. "Dare" – 4:05
2. "Highway (Under Construction)" – 4:17
3. "Dare" (Soulwax remix) – 5:48
4. "Dare" (music video) – 4:47

Japanese CD single

1. "Dare" – 4:05
2. "Highway (Under Construction)" – 4:17
3. "Dare" (Soulwax remix) – 5:48
4. "Clint Eastwood" (live) – 4:31
5. "Dare" (music video) – 4:47

Australian limited-edition CD single

1. "Dare" – 4:05
2. "Highway (Under Construction)" – 4:17
3. "Dare" (Soulwax remix) – 5:48
4. "Feel Good Inc." – 3:42
5. "Dare" (music video) – 4:47

US digital single

1. "Dare" (Soulwax remix) – 5:48

== Personnel ==
- Roses Gabor – vocals
- Shaun Ryder – additional vocals
- Damon Albarn – additional vocals, synthesizers
- James Dring – drums, drum programming
- Jason Cox – drum programming, mixing, engineering
- Danger Mouse – drum programming, sampled loops, mixing
- Howie Weinberg – mastering
- Steve Sedgwick – mixing assistance

== Charts ==
=== Weekly charts ===
2005–2006 weekly chart performance for "Dare"
Chart (2005–2006)	Peak position
Australia (ARIA)	11
Australian Club Chart (ARIA)	2
Australian Urban (ARIA)	4
Austria (Ö3 Austria Top 40)	29
Belgium (Ultratip Bubbling Under Flanders)	3
Belgium (Ultratip Bubbling Under Wallonia)	2
CIS Airplay (TopHit)	18
Czech Republic Airplay (ČNS IFPI)	16
Europe (Eurochart Hot 100)	4
Germany (GfK)	37
Greece (IFPI)	28
Hungary (Editors' Choice Top 40)	23
Iceland (Tónlist)	8
Ireland (IRMA)	7
Italy (FIMI)	11
Netherlands (Single Top 100)	98
New Zealand (Recorded Music NZ)	5
Polish Airplay Top 100 (ZPAV)	3
Russia Airplay (TopHit)	17
Scottish Singles Sales (Official Charts)	2
Switzerland (Schweizer Hitparade)	22
UK Singles (Official Charts)	1
US Billboard Hot 100	87
US Alternative Airplay (Billboard)	8
US Dance Club Songs (Billboard)	4
US Dance Airplay (Billboard)	4

2025 weekly chart performance for "Dare"
Chart (2025)	Peak position
US Hot Rock & Alternative Songs (Billboard)	21

=== Year-end charts ===
2005 year-end chart performance for "Dare"
Chart (2005)	Position
Australia (ARIA)	64
Australian Club Chart (ARIA)	13
Brazil (Crowley)	191
CIS Airplay (TopHit)	163
Europe (Eurochart Hot 100)	70
Italy (Musica e dischi)	67
New Zealand (RIANZ)	33
Russia Airplay (TopHit)	149
UK Singles (OCC)	26
Venezuela (Record Report)	28

2006 year-end chart performance for "Dare"
Chart (2006)	Position
CIS Airplay (TopHit)	169
US Hot Dance Airplay (Billboard)	21
US Modern Rock Tracks (Billboard)	26
Russia Airplay (TopHit)	156

== Certifications ==
Certifications for "Dare"
Region	Certification	Certified units/sales
Australia (ARIA)	Gold	35,000^{^}
Denmark (IFPI Danmark)	Gold	45,000^{‡}
New Zealand (RMNZ)	3× Platinum	90,000^{‡}
United Kingdom (BPI)	2× Platinum	1,200,000^{‡}
^{^} Shipments figures based on certification alone.^{‡} Sales+streaming figures based on certification alone.

== Release history ==
Release dates and formats for "Dare"
Region	Date	Format(s)	Label(s)	Ref.
United Kingdom	29 August 2005	CD; DVD	Parlophone	
Australia	5 September 2005	CD	Parlophone	
Japan	7 September 2005	CD	Parlophone	
United States	10 October 2005	Alternative radio	Virgin America	
United States	21 February 2006	Contemporary hit radio	Virgin America	
