= Andrew Savage =

American musician & painter (born 1986)

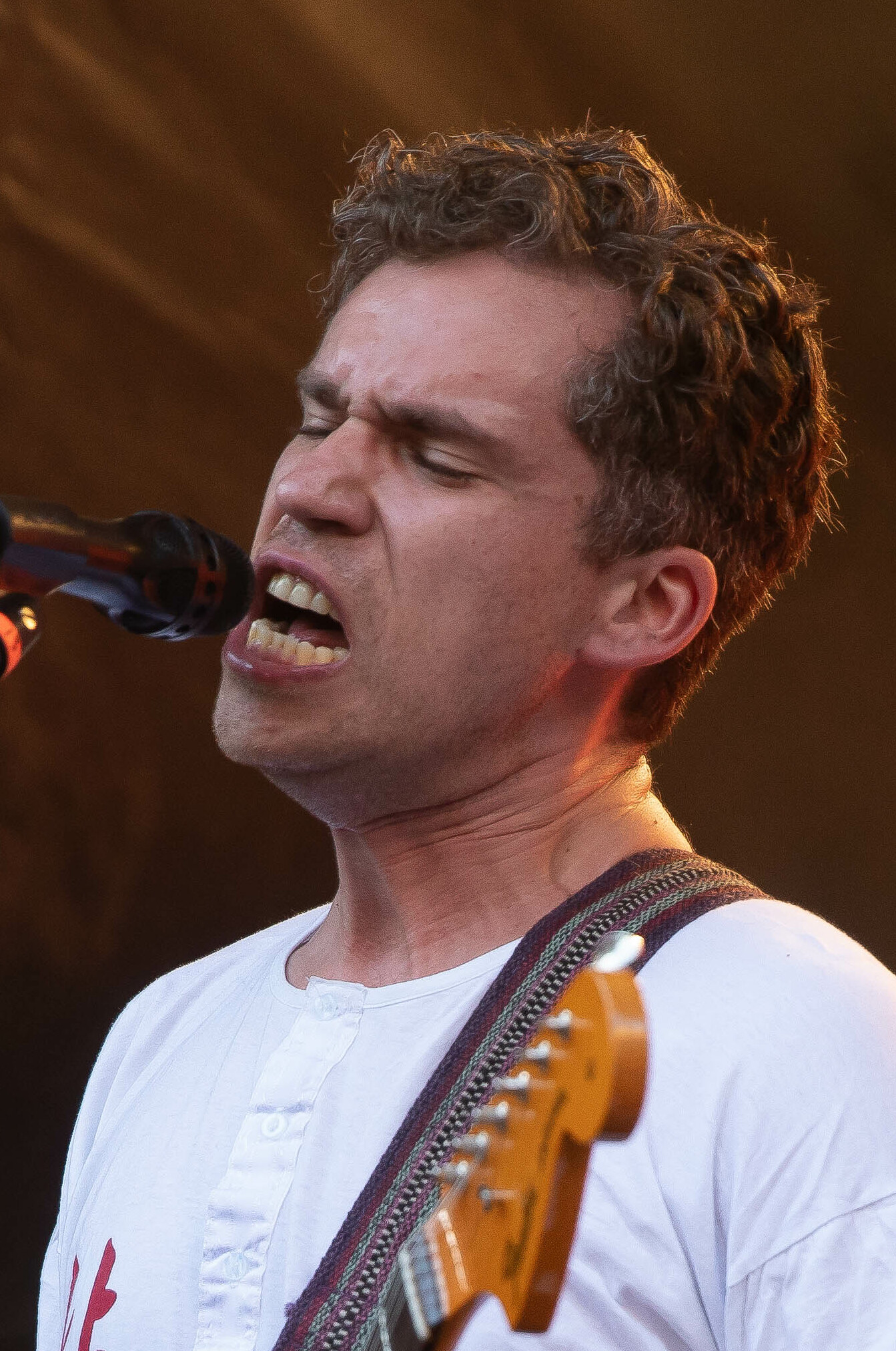
- Andrew Savage in 2019
- Born: March 13, 1986 (age 40); Denton, Texas, U.S.
- Education: University of North Texas
- Occupations: Musician, producer, painter, visual artist
- Years active: 2006–present
- Musical career
- Genres: Indie rock, post-punk, art punk, garage punk, experimental rock
- Instruments: Vocals; guitar; bass; keyboards
- Labels: Dull Tools, Rough Trade
- Website: a-savage.com

Andrew Savage (born March 13, 1986), or A. Savage, is an American singer, songwriter, musician, and painter, best known for his work as co-frontman for the rock band Parquet Courts.

In addition to his work for Parquet Courts, Savage is also a solo artist. In 2017, he released his first album, Thawing Dawn, under the stage name A. Savage.

Savage is also a painter and visual artist, and has created all Parquet Courts' album art. Savage received a Grammy Awards nomination for Best Recording Package for the album art of his band's 2016 album Human Performance.

== Music career ==
In 2006, Savage founded Teenage Cool Kids, and was later joined by Daniel Zeigler, who Savage met at the University of North Texas. The two were later joined by Chris Pickering and Bradley Kerl. The group went on a United States tour in 2007 and 2008. The band disbanded shortly after the release of their third album, Denton After Sunset, in 2011.

In 2008, Savage formed the duo Fergus & Geronimo with friend Jason Kelly. The two met while working on the Teenage Cool Kids album, Foreign Lands. In January 2011, the duo released their first album, Unlearn. A year later, the duo released their second and final album, Funky Was the State of Affairs.

In 2010, Savage relocated to Brooklyn, New York, and soon after started the group Parquet Courts with his friend and University of North Texas classmate Austin Brown, in addition to Sean Yeaton and Andrew's brother, Max Savage.

In 2011, Parquet Courts independently released their debut studio album, American Specialties. The record was later reissued in 2021 by Rough Trade Records.

Just over one year later in 2012, Parquet Courts released Light Up Gold.

In 2013, Parquet Courts released their first EP, titled Tally All the Things That You Broke. Since two of the band members were unable to assist with producing the record, it was released under the moniker Parkay Quarts.

In 2014, Parquet Courts released two albums, Sunbathing Animal and Content Nausea. The latter was released as Parkay Quarts.

In 2015, Parquet Courts released their second EP, Monastic Living.

In 2016, Parquet Courts released their fifth studio album, Human Performance. Savage received a Grammy Awards nomination for his work on the record packaging and album art.

In 2017, Savage released his debut solo album, Thawing Dawn, under the stage name A. Savage.

Just two weeks after Savage's solo album release, Parquet Courts released the collaborative album Milano. The band teamed up with Italian musician Daniele Luppi to produce the record. The album featured Yeah Yeah Yeahs lead singer Karen O on a number of tracks.

In 2018, the band released the album Wide Awake!. The album received generally high regards, and was named album of the year by Australian radio station Double J and second-best album of the year by American music magazine Paste.

In 2021, Parquet Courts released their seventh album titled Sympathy for Life.

Savage's second solo album, Several Songs About Fire, was released in October 2023. It features guest vocals from Cate Le Bon.

== Personal life ==
Andrew Savage was born in Denton, Texas. He attended and graduated from Denton's University of North Texas, where he received a degree in painting.

== Discography ==
As a member of Parquet Courts

- Studio albums
  - American Specialties (2011)
  - Light Up Gold (2012)
  - Sunbathing Animal (2014)
  - Content Nausea as Parkay Quarts (2014)
  - Human Performance (2016)
  - Wide Awake! (2018)
  - Sympathy for Life (2021)
- Collaborative albums
  - Milano with Daniele Luppi (2017)
- Live albums
  - Live at Third Man Records (2015)
- EPs
  - Tally All the Things That You Broke as Parkay Quarts (2013)
  - Monastic Living EP (2015)

As A. Savage

- Studio albums
  - Thawing Dawn (2017)
  - Several Songs About Fire (2023)

== Awards ==
Year	Nominee / work	Award	Result	Ref.
2017	"Human Performance" (Parquet Courts)	Best Recording Packaging - Grammy Awards	Nominated	
2016	"Human Performance" (Parquet Courts)	Best Art Vinyl - Best Art Vinyl	Nominated	

== See also ==
- List of Musicians from Denton, TX
- Music of Denton, TX
