= Black (disambiguation) =

Black is a color corresponding to the absence of light.

Black(s), Black's or The Black(s) may also refer to:

== People and fictional characters ==
- Black people or blacks, a racial categorization of humans mostly used for people of Sub-Saharan African descent, Indigenous Australians and Melanesians
- Black (singer) (1962–2016), a stage name for Colin Vearncombe
- Black (surname), a list of people and fictional characters
- List of people known as the Black, various people, real or fictional

== Places ==
=== Terrestrial ===
- Black, Alabama, a town, United States
- Black, Illinois, an unincorporated community, United States
- Black, Missouri, an unincorporated community, United States
- The Black-E, a community arts centre in Liverpool, England
- Zamora, California, formerly called Blacks and Black's

=== Extraterrestrial ===
- Black (crater), a lunar crater
- 11207 Black, a main-belt asteroid

== Art and entertainment ==
=== Film and television ===
- Black (2004 film), a Malayalam film directed by Ranjith Balakrishnan
- Black (2005 film), a Hindi film directed by Sanjay Leela Bhansali
- Black (2008 film), a French heist film directed Pierre Laffargue
- Black (2015 Belgian film), a Belgian crime film by Adil El Arbi and Bilall Fallah
- Black (2015 Bengali film), a Bengali film directed by Raja Chanda
- Black (2024 film), a Tamil sci-fi horror film directed by KG Balasubramani
- The Blacks (film), a 2009 Croatian film
- Black (South Korean TV series), a 2017 South Korean TV series
- Black (Indian TV series), a 2009 Hindi-language Indian television series
- Pacific Rim: The Black, a 2021 Netflix animated television series
- "Black" (Supernatural), a 2014 television episode of the Supernatural fantasy U.S. TV show

=== Games ===
- Black (video game), a 2006 first-person shooter
- Pokémon Black and White, 2011 video games for the Nintendo DS
- Twisted Metal: Black, a 2001 vehicle combat video game
- White and Black in chess
- Black & White (video game), a 2001 god game
  - Black & White 2, the 2005 sequel

=== Literature ===
- Black (novel), a novel in the Circle Trilogy by Ted Dekker
- Black (play), a play by Joyce Carol Oates
- The Blacks (play), a 1958 play by the French dramatist Jean Genet

=== Music ===
- Black (event), a Dutch hardstyle event
- Black (singer), stage name of English singer Colin Vearncombe
- Black (video), a live performance video by Psychic TV
- Black (Bangladeshi band), a Bangladeshi rock band
- The Black (American band), an American rock band
- The Blacks (band), an American alt country band formed in 1993

==== Albums ====
- Black (band Black album), 2011
- Black (1987 singer Black album), a retrospective compilation released by Warner
- Black (1991 singer Black album), a studio album released by A&M
- Black (Dierks Bentley album) or the title song (see below), 2016
- Black (Lee Hyori album) or the title song, 2017
- Black (Lita Ford album) or the title song, 1994
- Black (Project Pitchfork album), 2013
- The Black (Asking Alexandria album) or the title song, 2016
- The Black (Imminence album), 2024
- The Black (EP), by William Control, 2017

==== Songs ====
- "Black" (Dierks Bentley song), 2016
- "Black" (Norah Jones song), 2011
- "Black" (Pearl Jam song), 1991
- "Black" (Sevendust song), 1997
- "Black" (Trivium song), 2012
- "Black" (YoungBoy Never Broke Again song), 2023
- "Black", by Basement from Colourmeinkindness, 2012
- "Black", by Danger Mouse and Daniele Luppi from Rome, 2011
- "Black", by Dave from Psychodrama, 2019
- "Black", by Guru Randhawa, 2019
- "Black", by Motionless in White from The Whorror, 2007
- "Black", by Neurosis from Pain of Mind, 1987
- "Black", by Sarah McLachlan from Solace, 1991
- "Black", by Will Oldham from I See a Darkness, 1999

== Other uses ==
- Black (horse), a coat color of horse
- Black (turkey), a breed of domestic turkey
- Black (automobile), a 19th-century U.S. automobile
- Black's Law Dictionary
- Black's Medical Dictionary
- Black Motor Company, an American automobile manufacturer from 1908 to 1910
- Royal Black Institution, also known as "The Black", a Loyal Order from Northern Ireland
- Blacks Photo Corporation, or Blacks, a defunct photography store chain
- Boeing Black, a phone by Boeing
- Blacks Outdoor Retail, a British retail store
- A slang for a Black & Mild, a tobacco product
- Shades of black color

== See also ==
- All Blacks, New Zealand rugby union team
- 6LACK (pronounced black), a stage name for Ricardo Valentine
- Blak (disambiguation)
- Blacc (disambiguation)
- Black and pink (disambiguation)
- Black and white (disambiguation)
- Black hole (disambiguation)
- Black Mirror, British anthology television series
- Black Saturday (disambiguation)
- White, opposite of black
