= Blackton =

Blackton may refer to:

- Blackton (surname), a surname
- Blackton, Arkansas, a location in unincorporated Monroe County, Arkansas, United States
- Blackton Reservoir, a reservoir in County Durham, England, United Kingdom

== See also ==
- Black Township (disambiguation)
- Blacktown (disambiguation)
- Black (disambiguation)
- Black Town in India
