= Zach Richter =

American creative director and designer (born 1984)

Zachary Richter
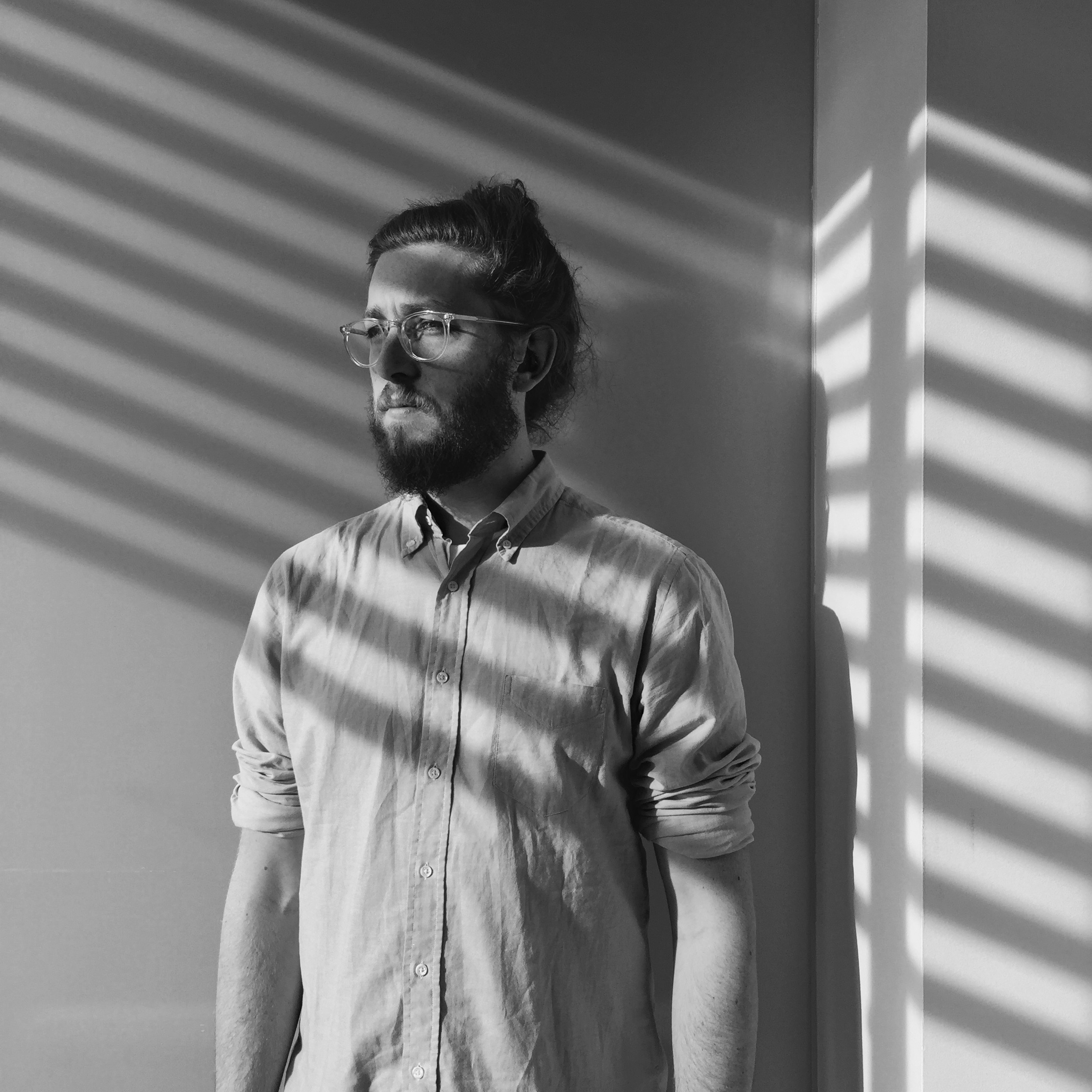
- Richter in 2015
- Born: 1984 (age 41–42); Chicago, Illinois, U.S.
- Occupations: Creative director, designer
- Website: zacharyrichter.com

Zach Richter (born 1984) is an American director, creative director and designer, best known for his work in virtual reality and interactive media.

== Biography ==
Born 1984, Richter attended Maryland Institute College of Art (MICA) and received a B.F.A.

From 2009 to 2014, Richter gained recognition as a Creative Director with Saatchi & Saatchi and Stopp/LA (USA), where he worked closely with adidas, Toyota, Google, Intel, Starbucks and others to help create and launch their global integrated campaigns.

In 2013, Richter collaborated with Chris Milk and musician Beck to create the world's first ever 360° live action virtual reality film, "Sound & Vision" which premiered at Sundance Film Festival.

In 2015, Richter and Milk directed The New York Times virtual reality documentary "Walking New York" about French artist JR (artist).

In 2017, Richter directed 'Hallelujah', the world's first Light Field VR music experience, shot with over 550 cameras using Lytro Immerge technology. Hallelujah premiered nationally at Tribeca Film Festival and Internationally at Cannes Film Festival. In 2017, he was also nominated for an Emmy for an interactive music video he directed for The Chemical Brothers called "Under Neon Lights".

Richter's work has been shown at Sundance, Tribeca, SXSW and Cannes film festivals, and has been honored with the highest awards in creativity and technology at Cannes Lions, The Webby Awards, and Clio Awards.

Richter is currently the creative director of Within, a virtual reality company founded by Chris Milk and Aaron Koblin. Since 2019, he has worked on 'Supernatural,' a first-of-its-kind Virtual Reality fitness experience for the Oculus Quest. Supernatural was named one of Time Magazine's "Best Inventions of 2020" and was the winner of Fast Company's "Best App or Game of 2020."

== Virtual Reality experiences and films ==
VR/AR experiences and films
Year	Title	Role	Technology	Notes
2019–present	Supernatural	Creative Director	Virtual Reality	VR Fitness experience for the Oculus Quest. One of Time Magazine's Best inventions of 2020 and winner of Fast Company's "Best App or Game" of 2020.
2019	Clio's Cosmic Quest	Creative Director	Augmented Reality (iOS) and Magic Leap	In collaboration with Preloaded
2018	Wonderscope	Creative Director	Augmented Reality	iOS app for kids that uses Augmented Reality to transform ordinary spaces into extraordinary stories
2017	The Chemical Brothers & St. Vincent: "Under Neon Lights"	Director	Web VR	Interactive VR music video that can be viewed on Experiments with Google. Nominated for an Emmy Award.
2017	Hallelujah	Director	Lytro Immerge technology	VR experience, based on the Leonard Cohen's song reimagined.
2017	The Possible VR Series	Director / Creative Director	Virtual Reality	In collaboration with David Gelb & GE
2016	Matsanjeni (The Bones)	Director	Virtual Reality	In collaboration with Thirst Project
2015	The New York Times: "Walking New York"	Co-director with Chris Milk	Vrse VR	Can be viewed on Google Cardboard or Samsung Gear VR.
2014	Evolution of Verse	Creative director and designer, through his work at Stopp/LA	Virtual Reality	In collaboration with Chris Milk & Vrse.works.
2013	Beck: "Sound & Vision"	Creative director and designer, through his work at Stopp/LA	Virtual Reality	In collaboration with Chris Milk & Radical Media

== Selected interactive works for brands ==
- General Electric: "The Possible" (2017)
- Intel: "What Lives Inside" (2015)
- Adidas: "I am Brazuca" (2014)
- Adidas: "miZXFlux" (2014)
- Starbucks: "Meet Me at Starbucks" (2014)
- Chrysler: "Beneath The Surface" (2014)
- Honda: "Project Drive-In (2013)
- Lincoln: "Hello, Again" (2012)
- Range Rover: "The Trail Less Traveled (2012)
