= Parquet Courts =

American rock band

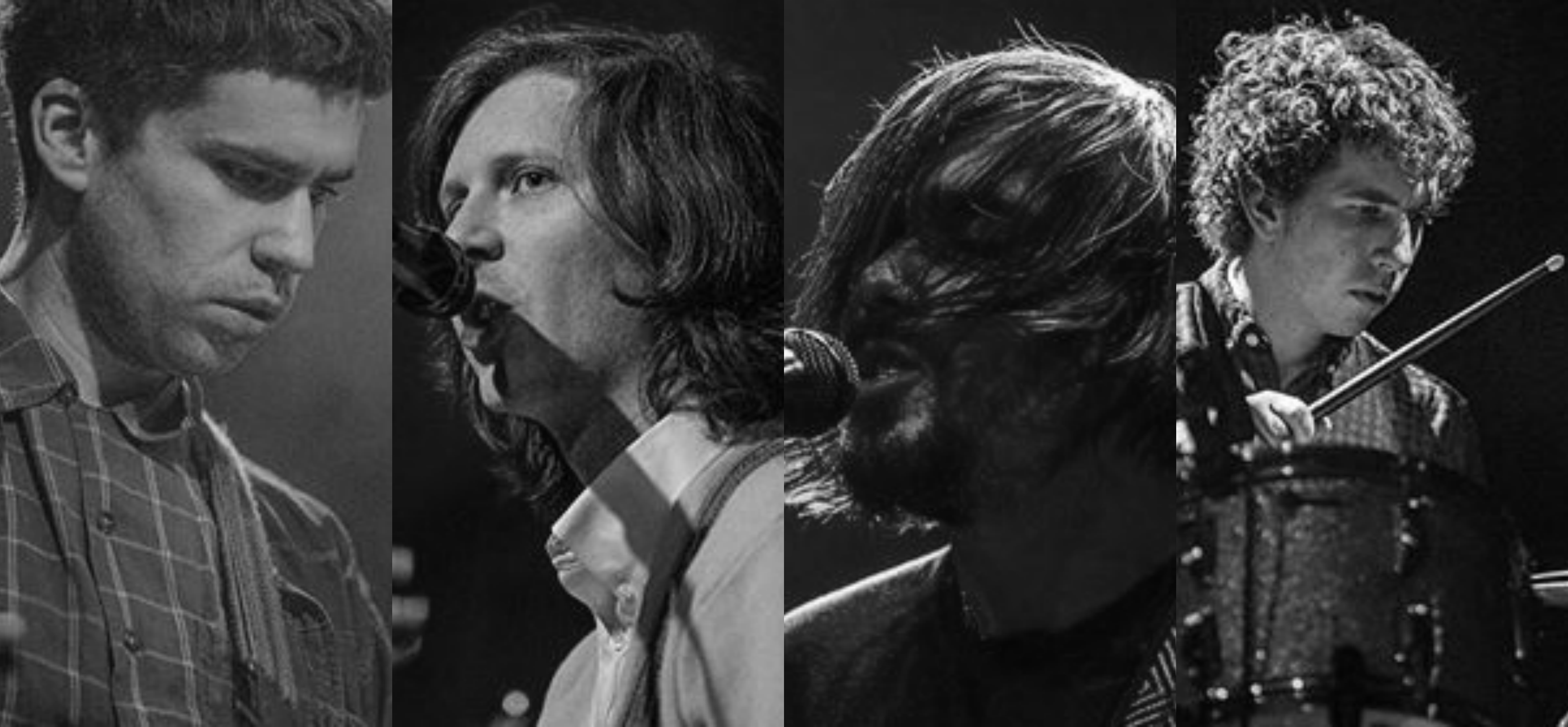
- Parquet Courts from left to right: Andrew Savage, Austin Brown, Sean Yeaton, Max Savage

Background information
- Also known as: Parkay Quarts
- Origin: New York City, U.S.
- Genres: Indie rock; post-punk; art punk; garage punk
- Years active: 2010–2022 (hiatus)
- Labels: What's Your Rupture?; Dull Tools; Rough Trade; Third Man
- Spinoffs: PCPC, Iconic Fugues
- Spinoff of: Teenage Cool Kids, Fergus & Geronimo
- Members: Andrew Savage; Austin Brown; Sean Yeaton; Max Savage
- Website: https://parquet-courts.com/

Parquet Courts is an American rock band from New York City that formed in 2010. The band has consisted of Andrew Savage (vocals, guitar, keyboards), Austin Brown (vocals, guitar, keyboards), Sean Yeaton (bass, vocals), and Max Savage (drums) for its entire duration. The band have released seven studio albums to date; the most recent, Sympathy for Life, was released in October 2021. The band has been inactive since 2022.

== History ==
Band members Andrew Savage and Austin Brown met in Denton, Texas while both students at the University of North Texas, in a student club named Knights of the Round Turntable, where they listened to and shared new records. Andrew had a number of musical projects during college, including Teenage Cool Kids and Fergus & Geronimo. Andrew and brother Max Savage, Parquet Courts' drummer, were both born and raised in Denton. The three relocated to Brooklyn after college and soon started Parquet Courts.

The band released their debut album, American Specialties, as an independent, limited cassette release in 2011. The album was later reissued with Rough Trade Records in 2021.

The band's second studio album, Light Up Gold (2012), was initially released on Savage's Dull Tools label and later reissued on What's Your Rupture? in 2013. Light Up Gold received critical acclaim, and entered the UK Record Store chart.

In 2014, the band reached number 55 on the UK albums chart with its third studio album, Sunbathing Animal. In May, the band made their network television debut with a performance of "Black and White" on Late Night with Seth Meyers; they were joined by the show's bandleader Fred Armisen on rhythm guitar for the performance.

Later in 2014, the band released "Uncast Shadow of a Southern Myth" as a single under an alternative name, Parkay Quarts. The moniker was carried over onto the band's next studio album, Content Nausea; this was done due to the album being created solely by Andrew Savage and Brown while Yeaton and Max Savage were occupied with other projects.

The following year the band released a collaboration LP Ramsgate with PC Worship under the name PCPC. They also released a mostly instrumental, experimental EP, entitled Monastic Living.

On February 4, 2016, the band announced their fifth studio album, entitled Human Performance. The album was released on April 8 through Rough Trade. Savage received a Grammy Award nomination for his work on the album's artwork, marking the band's only award nomination to date.

On October 13, 2017, Andrew Savage released his first solo album Thawing Dawn through Dull Tools, under the stage name A. Savage. That same month the band released Milano, a collaboration album with Daniele Luppi featuring Yeah Yeah Yeahs lead singer Karen O.

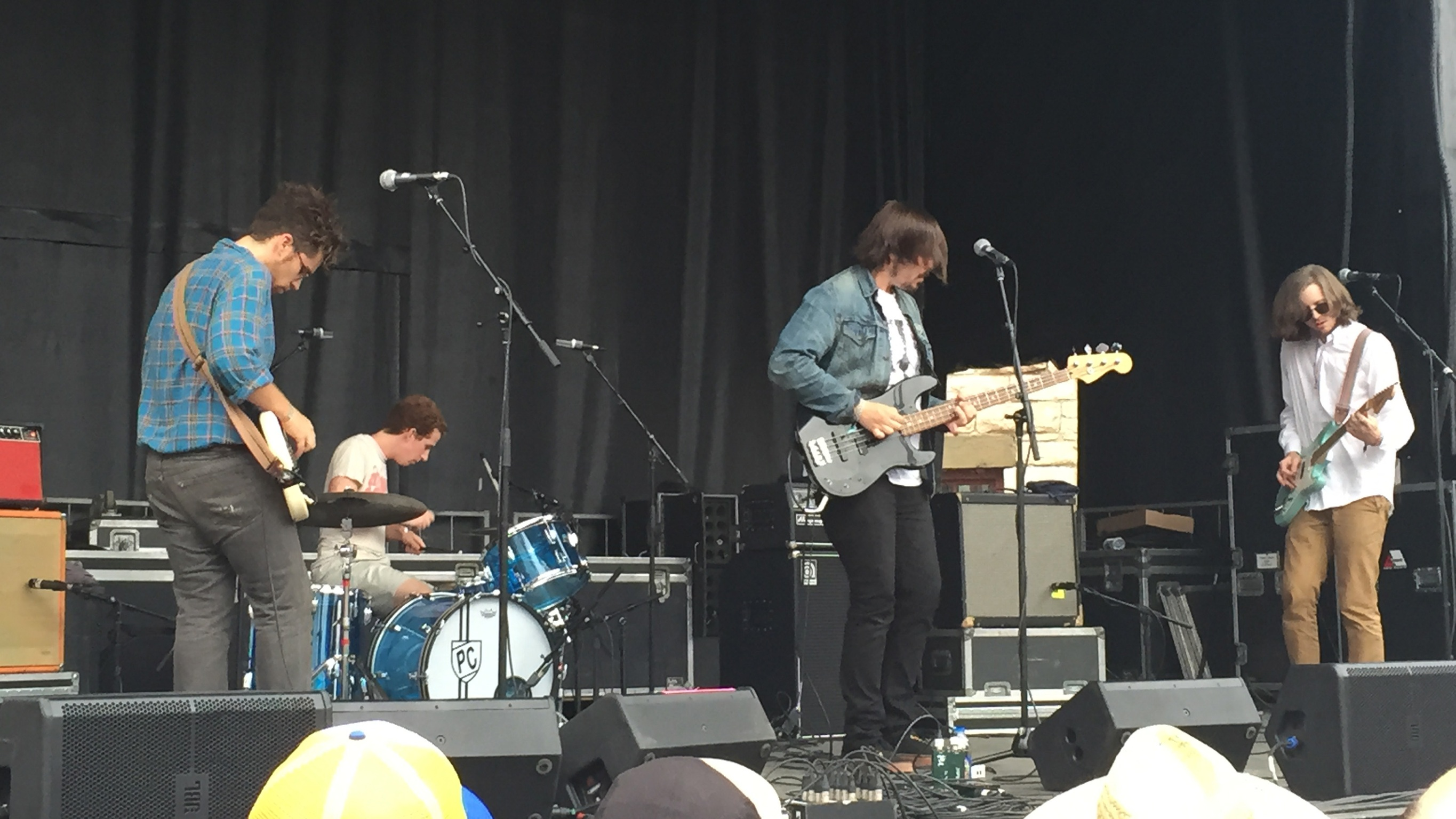
Parquet Courts at Solid Sound Festival, 2015

On May 18, 2018, the band released their sixth LP, Wide Awake! It was named Album of the Year by Australian radio station Double J. Their song "Almost Had to Start a Fight/In and Out of Patience" is featured in the video game EA Sports NHL 19, "One Man No City" was featured in an Episode of The Blacklist, and "Wide Awake" appeared as soundtrack in Konami football game eFootball Pro Evolution Soccer 2020. The band performed the title track of the album on The Ellen Degeneres Show on April 24, 2018, a television appearance that Pitchfork described as "unexpected". They were joined by Mary Lattimore and members of Destruction Unit, Woods, The Ukiah Drag, and Drawing Boards on backing vocals and auxiliary percussion.

The band's seventh full-length album, Sympathy for Life, was released on October 22, 2021. In January 2022, the band released the stand-alone single "Watching Strangers Smile", a previously-recorded version of which had only existed as a B-side to the "Black Widow Spider" 7-inch. They returned to The Ellen Degeneres Show to perform the song, as well as a seven-minute version of "Stoned and Starving" that featured snippets of "American Specialties" and "Light Up Gold".

Between February and March 2022, Parquet Courts headlined a North American tour, with Nigerien afro-psychedelic guitarist Mdou Moctar as their opening act. The band played their final show to date in August 2022 at Green Man Festival in Crickhowell. The following year, Savage resumed his solo career with the album Several Songs About Fire. In an interview with Post Trash, he also confirmed that although the band had entered a hiatus, they had not broken up.

It's different being in a band when we're the age we're now, compared to when we started. When we started three of us were 24, and Max was 18. Our twenties were spent touring. I'm 37 now, and I'm probably the one that's most eager to tour. The other guys have wives and children, and children get older and need a bit more attention. We're all artists outside of the band who do other projects, as well. I'm not the only one kind of doing their own thing here. [...] We will definitely do something again. Rest assured.

In October 2026, when launching a new project dubbed Iconic Fugues, Savage noted that Parquet Courts were "not active at the moment, but still a band."

== Musical style ==
Their musical style has been described as indie rock, post-punk, art punk, and garage punk.

== Band members ==
- Andrew Savage – lead vocals, lead guitar, keyboards
- Austin Brown – lead vocals, rhythm guitar, keyboards
- Sean Yeaton – bass guitar, backing and occasional lead vocals
- Max Savage – drums, percussion, backing vocals

== Discography ==
=== Albums ===
==== Studio albums ====
Title	Album details	Peak chart positions									
Title	Album details	US	AUS	BEL (FL)	BEL (WA)	FRA	GER	NLD	SCO	SWI	UK
American Specialties	Released: 2011; Label: Play Pinball!	—	—	—	—	—	—	—	—	—	—
Light Up Gold	Released: August 18, 2012; Label: Dull Tools, What's Your Rupture?	— (Note: Light Up Gold did not enter the US Billboard 200, but peaked at number 25 on the US Heatseekers Albums Chart.)	— (Note: Light Up Gold did not enter the Australian ARIA Albums Chart but peaked at number 19 on the ARIA Hitseekers Chart.)	—	—	—	—	—	—	—	—
Sunbathing Animal	Released: June 3, 2014; Label: What's Your Rupture?, Rough Trade (UK)	55	— (Note: Sunbathing Animal did not enter the Australian ARIA Albums Chart but peaked at number five on the ARIA Hitseekers Chart.)	69	181	—	—	—	65	—	55
Content Nausea (as Parkay Quarts)	Released: November 28, 2014; Label: What's Your Rupture?	—	—	—	—	—	—	—	—	—	—
Human Performance	Released: April 8, 2016; Label: Rough Trade	118	— (Note: Human Performance did not enter the Australian ARIA Albums Chart but peaked at number four on the ARIA Hitseekers Chart.)	84	—	109	—	—	42	—	50
Wide Awake!	Released: May 18, 2018; Label: Rough Trade	122	93	42	117	106	—	116	19	64	27
Sympathy for Life	Released: October 22, 2021; Label: Rough Trade	— (Note: Sympathy for Life did not enter the US Billboard 200, but peaked at number 19 on the Top Album Sales Chart.)	26	49	118	160	96	94	14	—	42
"—" denotes a recording that did not chart or was not released in that territory.

==== Collaborative albums ====
Title	Album details
Milano (with Daniele Luppi)	Released: October 27, 2017; Label: Columbia

==== Live albums ====
- Live at Third Man Records (2015)

=== EPs ===
- Tally All the Things That You Broke (2013) (as Parkay Quarts) number 15 US Heat
- Monastic Living (2015)

=== Singles ===
List of singles as lead artist, with selected chart positions, showing year released and album name
Title	Year	Peak chart positions				Album
Title	Year	US AAA	BEL (FL)	MEX	UK Phys.	Album
"Picture of Health"	2012	—	—	—	99	Light Up Gold
"Borrowed Time"	2013	—	—	—	—	Light Up Gold
"Black & White"	2014	—	—	41	—	Sunbathing Animal
"Sunbathing Animal"	2014	—	—	—	23	Sunbathing Animal
"This is Happening Now"	2014	—	—	—	—	Non-album single
"Dust"	2016	—	— (Note: "Dust" did not enter the Flanders Ultratop Top 50, but charted as an "extra tip" on the Flanders Ultratop Bubbling Under chart.)	43	—	Human Performance
"Human Performance"	2016	—	—	42	11	Human Performance
"Captive of the Sun"	2016	—	—	—	8	Human Performance
"Almost Had to Start a Fight/In and Out of Patience"	2018	—	—	37	—	Wide Awake!
"Wide Awake!"	2018	—	—	48	10	Wide Awake!
"Mardi Gras Beads"	2018	—	—	—	9	Wide Awake!
"Total Football"	2018	—	—	—	2	Wide Awake!
"Hey Bug"	2020	—	—	—	—	Non-album single
"Plant Life"	2021	—	—	—	58	Sympathy for Life
"Walking at a Downtown Pace"	2021	—	—	—	—	Sympathy for Life
"Black Widow Spider"	2021	—	—	—	—	Sympathy for Life
"Homo Sapien"	2021	—	—	—	—	Sympathy for Life
"Watching Strangers Smile"	2022	33	—	—	—	Non-album single
"—" denotes releases that did not chart or were not released in that region.

=== Other ===
- Ramsgate, PCPC (2015) (collaboration with PC Worship)
