= Blak =

Blak may refer to:

== People ==
=== Given name ===
- Blak Douglas, Aboriginal Australian artist

=== Surname ===
- Blak (rapper), stage name of Henrik Blak, Danish rapper and songwriter
- Edouard Blak (1824–1895), Ottoman diplomat
- Kristian Blak (born 1947), Danish composer
- Rahim Blak, Macedonian artist

== Other uses ==
- Bläk, a defunct Finnish private club
- Blak culture, an identity used by some Indigenous Australians
- Coca-Cola BlāK, a discontinued coffee-flavoured soft drink

== See also ==
- Blak Greens, or Australian Greens First Nations Network
- Blak sovereignty
- Black (disambiguation)
- Blake (disambiguation)
