= Fergus & Geronimo =

- Origin: Denton, Texas
- Genres: Indie rock; lo-fi; noise pop; northern soul
- Years active: 2008–2011
- Labels: Hardly Art, Woodsist, Tic Tac Totally
- Members: Andrew Savage; Jason Kelly

Fergus & Geronimo were an experimental rock band from Denton, Texas. The duo had a multi-genre approach to songwriting, with influences including soul, pop, proto-punk, garage rock and psychedelic pop.

The band started in late 2008 when Andrew Savage and Jason Kelly were working on the Teenage Cool Kids' album Foreign Lands, which Kelly was recording/mixing. Andrew was attending University of North Texas at the time.

The initial idea for the band was to draw from such influences as Mothers of Invention and The Four Tops. Praise for recordings leaked on the internet helped garner attention early in the band's career. In July 2009 Woodsist released the first single, "Harder Than It's Ever Been".

On recording, Savage and Kelly are the main performers, but are joined live by a rotating personnel of musicians.

== Discography ==
=== Albums ===
- Unlearn (2011) Hardly Art
- Funky Was the State Of Affairs (2012) Hardly Art

=== Singles ===
- "Never Satisfied", 2010, Hardly Art
- "Harder Than It's Ever Been", 2009, Woodsist
- "Blind Muslim Girl", 2009, Tic Tac Totally
- "Tell It (In My Ear)", 2009, Transparent
