= Blacktown (disambiguation) =

Blacktown is a suburb of Sydney, New South Wales, Australia.

Blacktown may also refer to:

- City of Blacktown, Local Government Area
- Electoral district of Blacktown, New South Wales state electoral district
- Blacktown railway station, in Blacktown, New South Wales, Australia
- Blacktown (film), a 2005 Australian film
- Blacktown (Lapinot), a 1995 The Spiffy Adventures of McConey comics collection by Lewis Trondheim

== See also ==
- Black (disambiguation)
- Black Township (disambiguation)
- Blackton (disambiguation)
- Black Town, in India
