= Chris Milk =

American entrepreneur

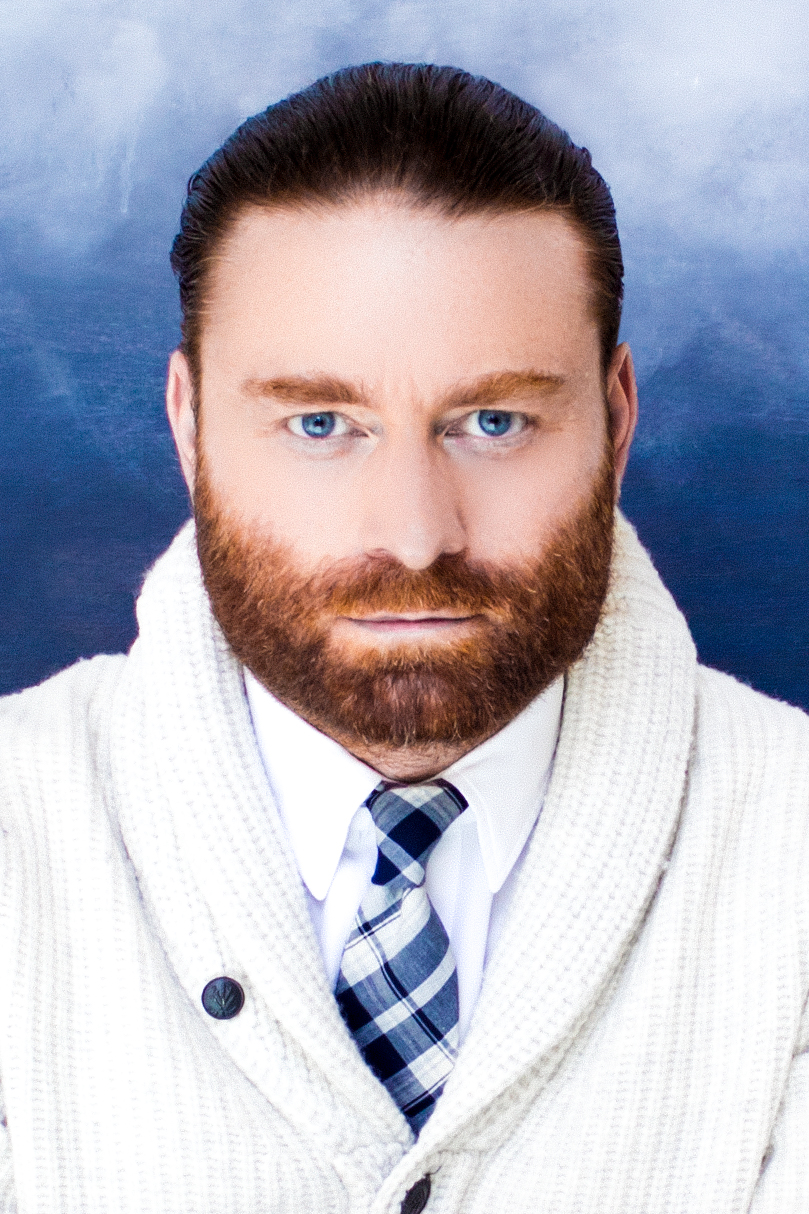
- Milk in 2015
- Born: 1975 or 1976 (age 50–51); Glen Cove, New York, U.S.
- Occupations: Entrepreneur, immersive artist, filmmaker, music video director
- Employer: Within
- Known for: Virtual reality, immersive art, music videos
- Website: Milk.co

Chris Milk (born 1975 or 1976) is an American entrepreneur, filmmaker, music video director, and immersive artist. He is co-founder and CEO of Within (Virtual Reality) (formerly Vrse), a virtual reality technology company, and co-founder of Here Be Dragons (formerly Vrse.works), a virtual reality production company. Milk began his career directing music videos and commercials, and in subsequent years became best known for bridging the gap between emerging technologies and new mediums for storytelling.

== Early life and education ==
Chris Milk was born in 1975 or 1976 in Glen Cove, New York. After attending Friends Academy High School, Milk studied Music and Film at the University of California, Santa Barbara, and then earned a B.F.A. in Film, Photography and Computer Graphics at the Academy of Art University in San Francisco, California.

== Career ==
=== Music videos, commercials, short films and interactive ===
Milk began his career directing music videos and commercials for artists and brands including Arcade Fire, U2, Kanye West, Green Day, Johnny Cash, Gnarls Barkley, The Chemical Brothers, John Mellencamp, Courtney Love, Modest Mouse, Nike, O2, Chevy and Nintendo.

Milk's collaboration with Kanye West on the single "All Falls Down" was shot entirely in first person perspective, a technique he utilized again in a commercial for O2's "Can Do" campaign and his short film "The Last Day Dream", signaling his future affinity for virtual reality and subjective storytelling. Milk collaborated again with Kanye West on the video for "Touch The Sky", which was in part an homage to Evel Knievel, a childhood hero of Milk's.

Milk's collaboration with Arcade Fire, Aaron Koblin and Google Creative Lab on "The Wilderness Downtown" in 2010 was one of his first interactive videos that utilized emerging technologies to create new, more personal ways for viewers to connect with digital experiences. The browser based video uses HTML5, satellite imagery and Google Street View to incorporate images from a viewer's childhood home mixed with digital footage and CGI elements. At the end of the video, viewers are encouraged to write a postcard to their younger selves. "The Wilderness Downtown" was named as one of Time's 30 Best Music Videos of all time, saying, "It's the first video that truly harnesses the digital age — and one of the most personal you'll ever watch." It was also exhibited at MoMA in New York in 2011.

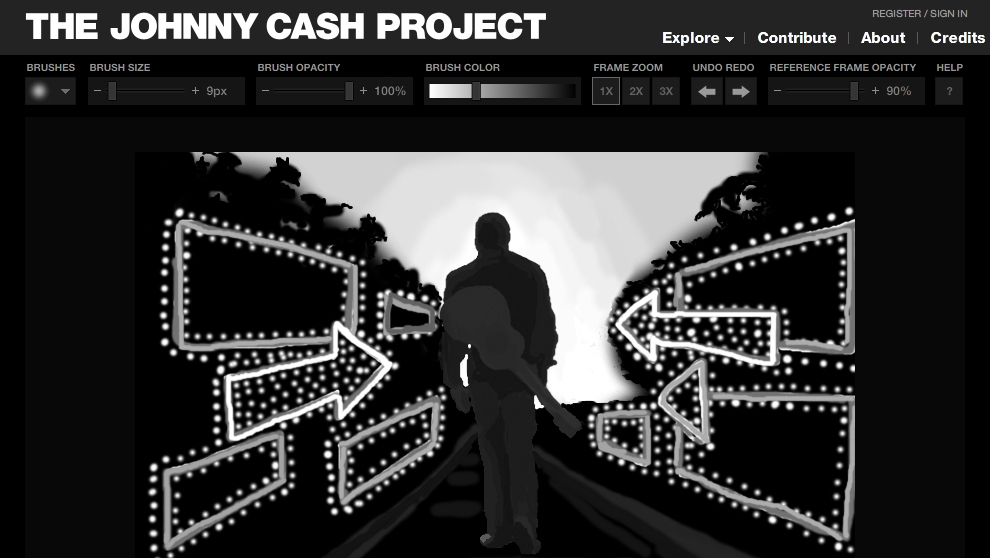
Screen capture from "The Johnny Cash Project"

Also in 2010, Milk created "The Johnny Cash Project", a collaboration with Aaron Koblin set to the Johnny Cash song "Ain't No Grave". In the interactive music video, users can submit drawn frames to be curated into an animated short film built upon a myriad of frames submitted by different users. As a result, the video constantly evolves and can be arranged by a set of various criteria. Users can elect to view the highest rated frames, or all frames that are done in a pointillist or abstract style, for example. NPR suggested that the digital experience allowed fans to connect with Cash posthumously.

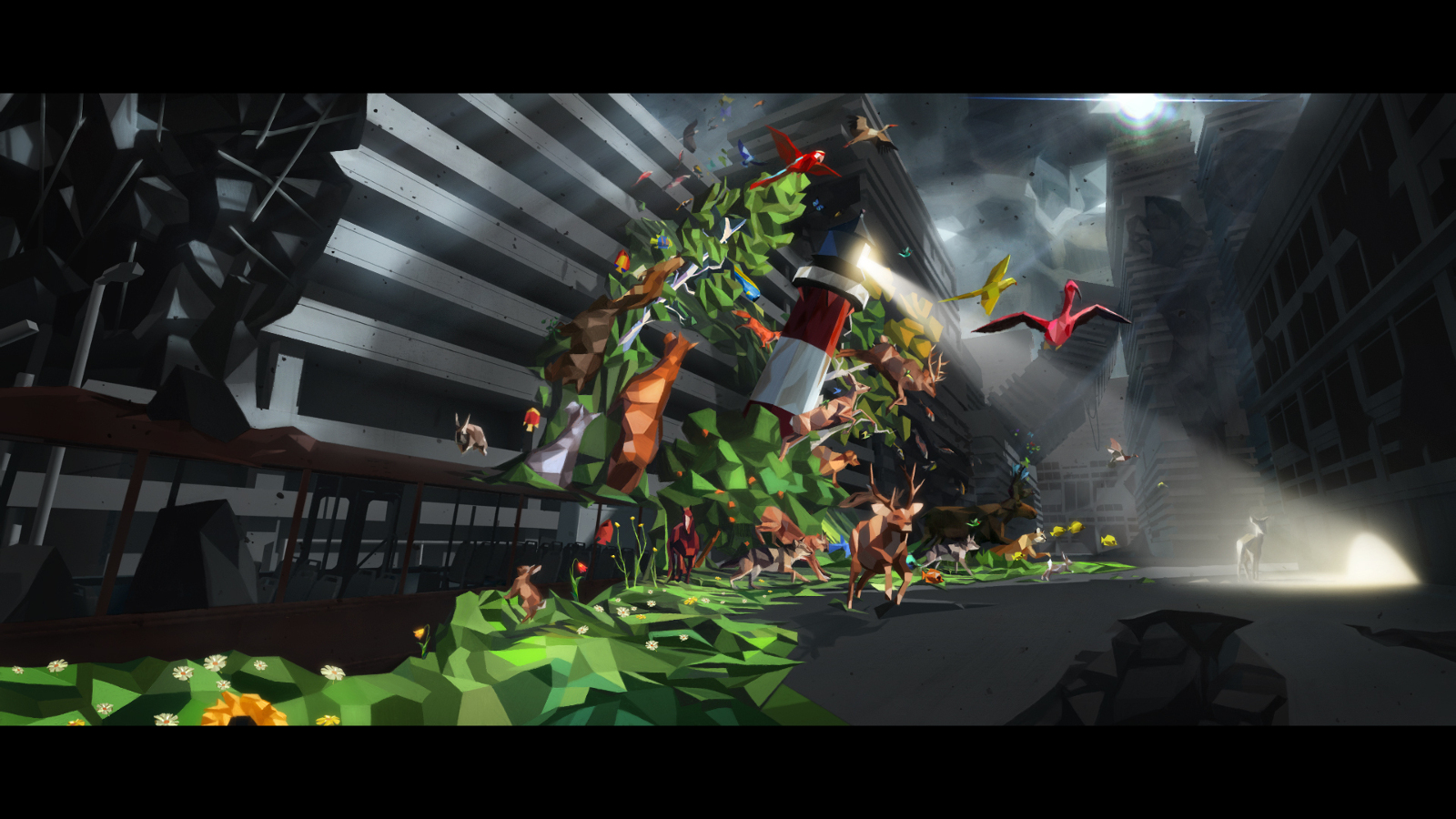
Still Image from "3 Dreams of Black"

In 2011, Milk collaborated again with Aaron Koblin and Google Creative Lab on the interactive short film "3 Dreams of Black" based on the track ""Black"" from the Danger Mouse album Rome, which features Daniele Luppi, Jack White and Norah Jones. Here, Milk used WebGL to turn a user's web browser into a canvas for creating 3D objects within an interactive, CGI setting. When viewing the film, which is also told from first person perspective, users can control the vantage point with the use of their mouse. As the user's mouse hovers over the browser window playing the film, 3D objects appear and proliferate within the world of the film. Users can create additional 3D objects to add to the film within the film's website.

In 2008, Milk directed Second Unit for "A Mother's Promise", the film that introduced Barack Obama at the Democratic National Convention.

=== Immersive installations ===
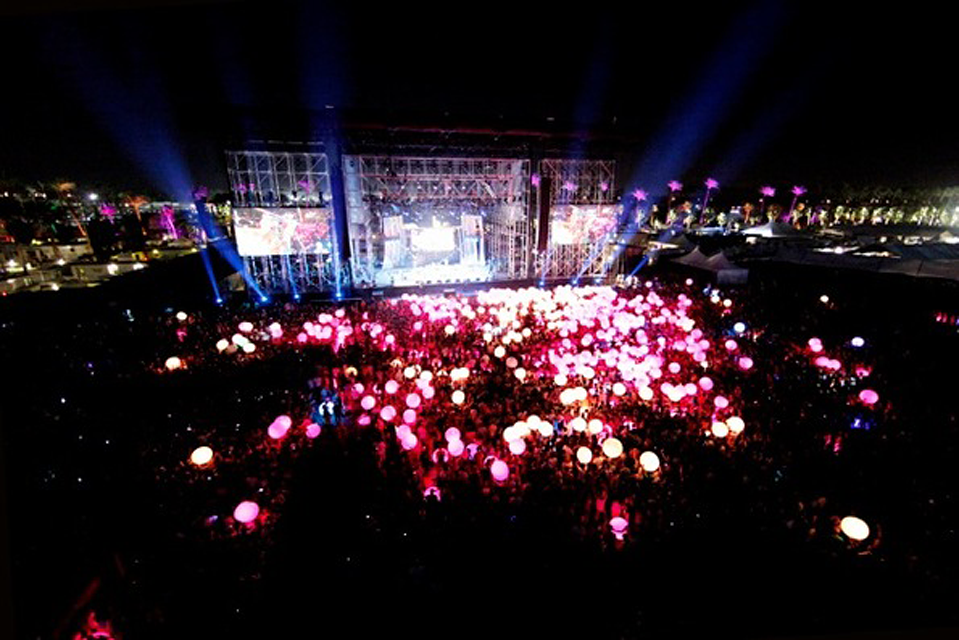
"Summer Into Dust" at Coachella 2011

Milk collaborated with Arcade Fire, ESKI and Moment Factory in 2011 to create an interactive experience called "Summer Into Dust" for concert goers at the closing of the 2011 Coachella Music Festival. During Arcade Fire's final song, "Wake Up", cascades of beach balls were released onto the crowd. Milk and his team had fit LEDs and IR transmitters into each ball to light paint kaleidoscopic patterns across the audience. The balls physically connected the audience with the band and their performance, and the moment has been widely credited as the highlight of the festival.

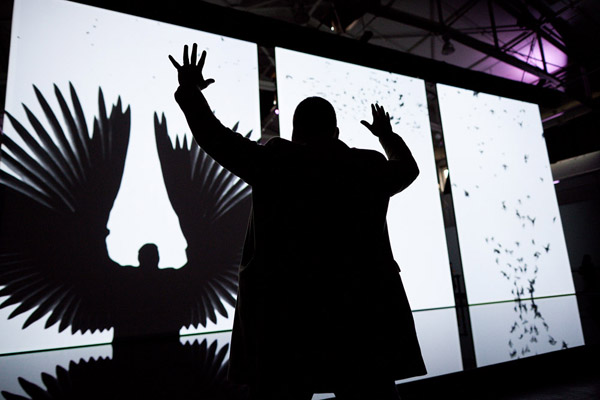
"The Treachery of Sanctuary"

In 2012, Milk created "The Treachery of Sanctuary", an interactive immersive art installation currently touring the world with The Creators Project. It is a large-scale interactive installation that utilizes the Microsoft Kinect to project and manipulate a participant's shadow onto a triptych. In the first panel, shadows of birds congregate to form the participant's shadow. In the second panel, the participant's shadow is torn apart by the birds. In the third, the participant's shadow sprouts wings, allowing the shadow to fly out of the frame as the participant flaps their arms. The triptych created a cycle that according to Milk interprets the universal human experience of birth, death and transfiguration. "The Treachery of Sanctuary" was exhibited at the Onassis Cultural center in Greece, and was selected to be a part of the Sundance Film Festival's New Frontier exhibition in January 2016.

Also in 2012, Milk collaborated with Aaron Koblin to create "The Exquisite Forest", a collaborative online experience that allows participants to create branching animated narratives. In the piece, a series of trees represent a series of narratives, each beginning with the seed of an initial animation. As participants create new animations to add to the narrative, the animated trees branch out, creating a representation of the multiple narratives spawned by user input. The piece was exhibited at the Tate Modern in London between 2012 and 2013.

=== Virtual reality ===
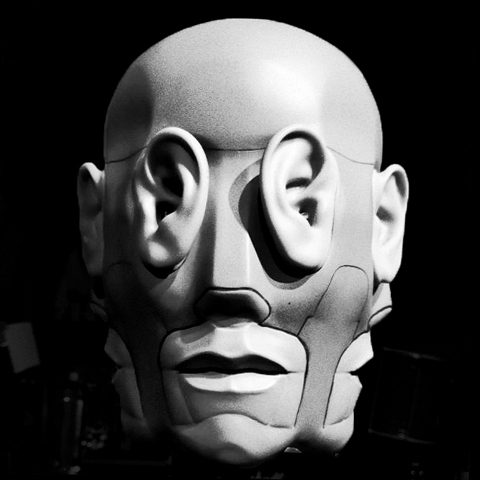
Milk's binaural audio recording instrument

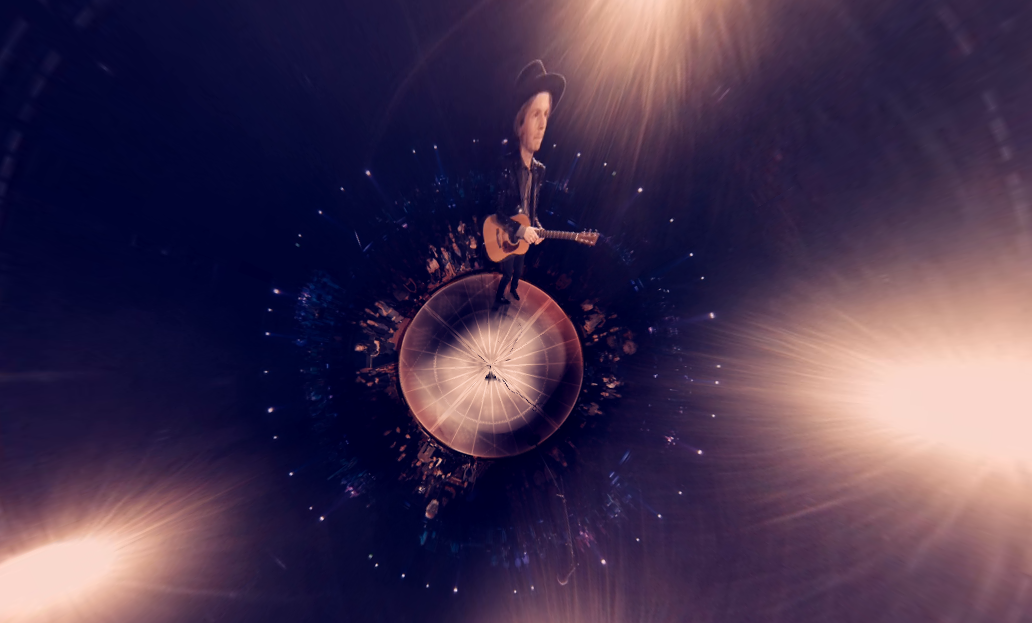
Beck in "Sound and Vision"

Milk's first virtual reality production was a collaboration with musical artist Beck entitled "Sound and Vision". The project was initially released online, giving viewers the choice to watch Beck perform from the vantage point of different 360 degree cameras, and further allowed viewers to use their computer's mouse to change their viewing perspective. Milk invented a binaural audio recording instrument in order to capture sound in a 3D environment to mimic real life human experience. The result allows the audio to shift perspective in accordance with what the viewer is seeing, creating a natural virtual experience for the audience member. In the tradition of his work on "The Wilderness Downtown" and Rome, Milk utilized modern technologies to further expand the viewing experience: viewers could enable their computer's webcam to shift the perspective of the 360 video up, down, left and right with the tilt of their head.

In 2014, Milk and Aaron Koblin founded Within (Virtual Reality) (formerly Vrse). Here Be Dragons (formerly Vrse.works) has partnered with top talent in film and television and represents roster of directors for virtual reality content creation. The company has produced award-winning content including Clouds Over Sidra with the United Nations, and work with The New York Times, Vice, NBC, and Nike. Vrse.farm is working in partnership with Megan Ellison's Annapurna Pictures to develop original cinematic work in virtual reality.

=== Virtual reality projects ===
Through Within and Vrse.works, Milk has explored Virtual Reality as a means to tell documentaries, narratives, and share live experiences.

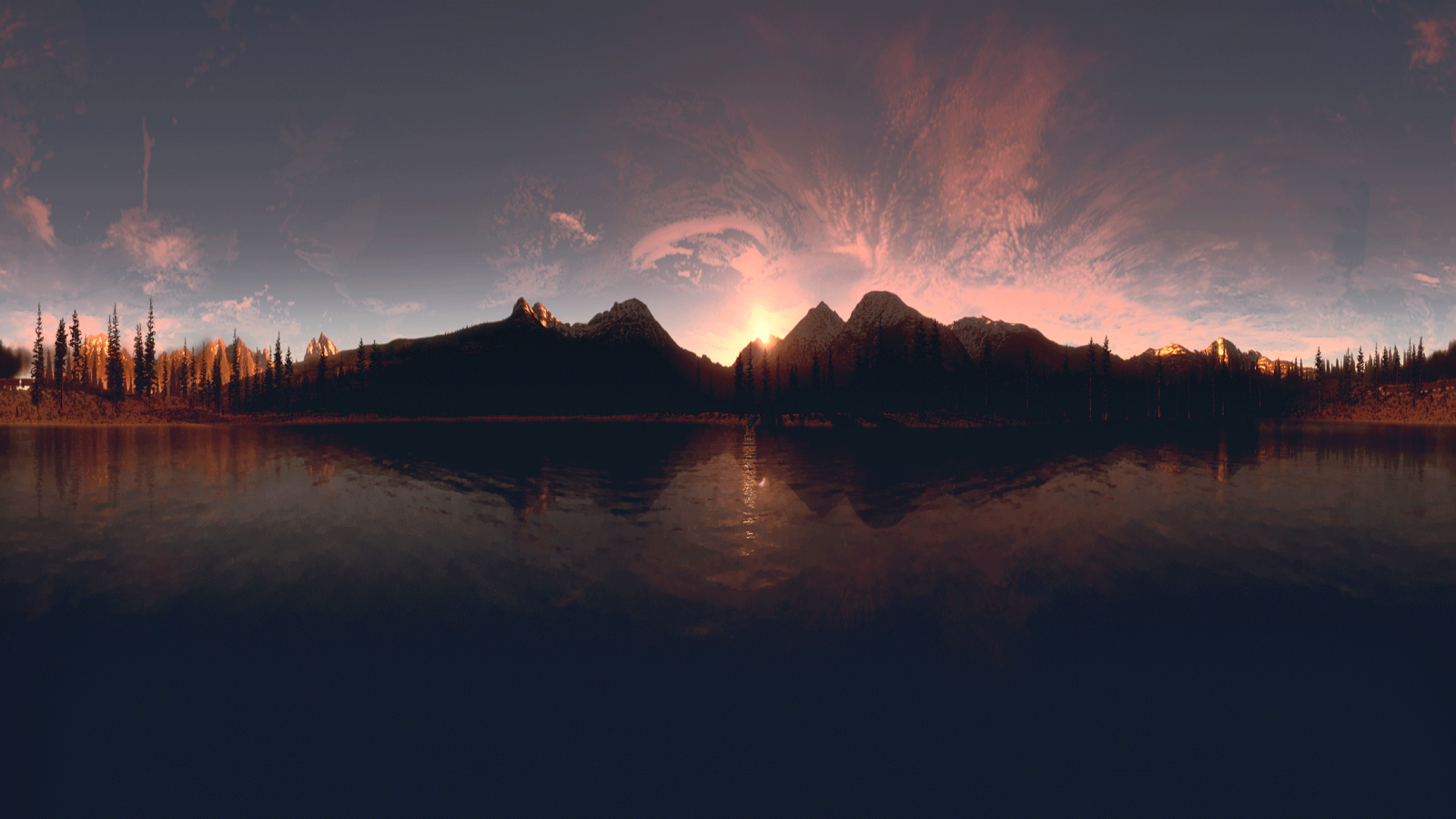
Still Image from "Evolution of Verse"

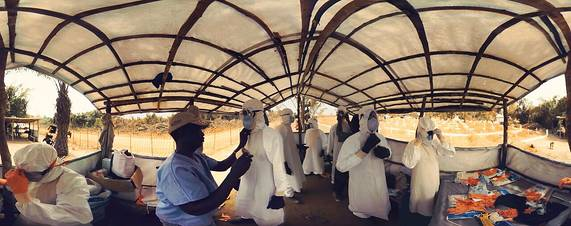
Still Image from "Waves of Grace"

In December 2014, Milk and Spike Jonze captured the Millions March in New York, which protested police brutality for Vice News. Milk launched the Within app platform at the 2015 Sundance Film Festival in addition to "Evolution of Verse", a photo-realistic CGI-rendered 3-D virtual reality film, and "Clouds Over Sidra", a virtual reality documentary made in partnership with the United Nations which follows a 12-year-old girl's life in a Syrian refugee camp. After the Sundance launch, Vrse.works captured Saturday Night Live's 40th Anniversary special in VR. Milk created "Walking New York" with Zach Richter, a VR experience made in partnership with The New York Times which follows French artist JR and his making of a 150-foot-tall portrait of a recent immigrant to NYC that was wheat pasted across the Flatiron Building Pedestrian Plaza for less than 24 hours. Vrse.works recently partnered again with the United Nations to create the VR experience Waves of Grace. The film transports viewers to West Point, the most populous slum in the capital of Liberia, and follows the experience of Decontee Davis, an Ebola survivor who uses her immunity to help others affected by the disease. Most recently, Milk and his team have released music videos for U2 and Muse in partnership with Apple Music. In the video for U2's "Song for Someone," singers from around the world sing alongside U2 within the virtual environment. In Muse's "Revolt," viewers watch from the point of view of multiple drones as the music spawns a revolution.

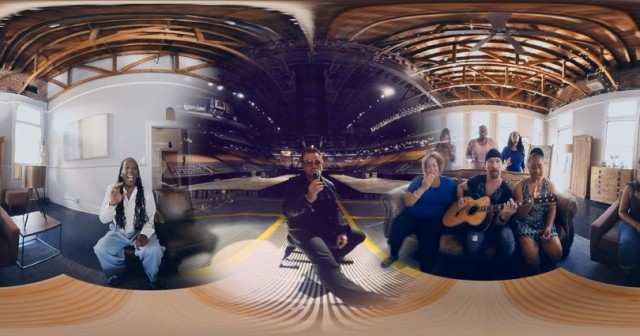
Bono in a still image from "Song For Someone"

== Other activities ==
Milk presented at TED in 2015 on the power of virtual reality as a medium to advance humanity, and again in 2016 on the birth of virtual reality as a new art form.

== Recognition and awards ==
Milk's work has been exhibited in museums worldwide, including the Museum of Modern Art in New York, the Tate Modern in London, the Barbican Centre in London, Cent Quatre in Paris, and the Ullens Center for Contemporary Art in Beijing.

Milk has been honored twice with the Grand Prix Cannes Lions, the D&AD Black Pencil, the Grand Clio, and SXSW's 'Best of Show' alongside multiple Grammy nominations, MTV Moon Men, and the UK MVA Innovation Award.

Milk was named one of WIRED's 100 Most Influential People in 2016, one of The Hollywood Reporter's L.A.'s 25 Most Powerful Digital Players in 2016, Adweek's Creative 100 list in 2015, as one of the 50 Most Creative People by Advertising Age in 2011 and 2015, and one of the "100 Most Creative People in Business" by Fast Company in 2012.

== Videography ==
=== Music videos ===
2015

- U2 - "Song for Someone"

2013

- Beck - "Sound and Vision"

2011

- Rome - "3 Dreams of Black"
- Rome - "Two Against One"

2010

- Arcade Fire - "We Used to Wait/The Wilderness Downtown"
- Johnny Cash - "Ain't No Grave/The Johnny Cash Project"

2008

- Gnarls Barkley - "Who's Gonna Save My Soul"

2006

- Kanye West featuring Lupe Fiasco - "Touch the Sky"
- Gnarls Barkley - "Gone Daddy Gone"
- U2 & Green Day - "The Saints Are Coming"

2005

- Natasha Bedingfield - "These Words" (North American Version – Boom Boxes)
- Audioslave - "Doesn't Remind Me"

2004

- Courtney Love - "Mono"
- Kanye West featuring Syleena Johnson - "All Falls Down"
- Kanye West - "Jesus Walks" (Version 2 – Chain Gang/KKK Burning Cross)
- Jet - "Rollover DJ"
- Modest Mouse - "Ocean Breathes Salty"
- John Mellencamp - "Walk Tall"

2003

- The Chemical Brothers featuring The Flaming Lips - "The Golden Path"

=== Television commercials ===
2007

- Nike "Monument", "Practice", "Grundle", "Leaving", "Passion", "Nicknames"

2006

- L.L.Bean "Testing for Life", "Mt. Washington", "The Search"

2004

- UPN Safe Sex PSA "Jimmy & Stiffy"

2003

- Philips "Vinyl", "Walking the Dog"

2002

- Nintendo GameCube "Rush Holiday"

2001

- Nintendo Paper Mario "CutOut"

2000

- Telstra "Betty (Greyhounds)"

1999

- 3DO BattleTanx: Global Assault "The Six Million Dollar Bear"
- Terminate "Vendomatic"

year unknown

- Sprite "Extreme Is Dead" (spec ad)
- Calve "Gas Station"
- CA Energy Conservation "Supermarket"

== Personal life ==
Of his practice of Transcendental Meditation Milk said in 2016, "There's a really transcendental quality to virtual reality. ... TM is a really great portal into exploring those states within yourself. Virtual reality is basically an authored dream state."
