= Sympathy for Life =

Studio album by Parquet Courts
- Released: October 22, 2021
- Genres: Garage rock; dance-punk; post-punk; synth-rock
- Length: 45:05
- Language: English
- Label: Rough Trade
- Producers: Rodaidh McDonald; John Parish

Parquet Courts chronology
Wide Awake! (2018)	Sympathy for Life (2021)

Singles from Sympathy for Life
- 1. "Plant Life" Released: June 29, 2021; 2. "Walking at a Downtown Pace" Released: August 18, 2021; 3. "Black Widow Spider" Released: September 24, 2021; 4. "Homo Sapien" Released: October 19, 2021

Sympathy for Life is the seventh studio album by the American rock band Parquet Courts. The album was released on October 22, 2021, on Rough Trade Records. Produced by Rodaidh McDonald and John Parish, the album was preceded by the singles, "Plant Life", "Walking at a Downtown Pace", "Black Widow Spider" and "Homo Sapien".

The vast majority of the album was written and recorded before the COVID-19 pandemic, with the band working on long, improvised compositions before arranging them into songs influenced by clubbing and nightlife.

== Background ==
With the release of their sixth studio album, Wide Awake!, in May 2018, the band embarked on an extensive tour which lasted until November 2019. During this time, co-lead vocalists and guitarists Austin Brown and Andrew Savage became more interested in dance and techno music, becoming tired of the expectations of rock bands. Austin Brown noted: "I didn’t really feel like making another rock record. This whole scene of these massive indie rock festivals, seeing the way musicians are treated like faux celebrities, and the way minor indie musicians get worshiped in this unidirectional way — there’s the group on stage, everyone’s looking at them, and thinking they’re the most important people just because they happen to be the loudest. I got really into dance music and realized in those environments, the music is the thing that connects everybody."

Brown started attending nights out at the famed dance party venue The Loft in New York City, describing his experiences as "subversive, anti-establishment, progressive, and also the most enriching American psychedelic experience that has been created. This was something I really wanted to carry into the process of creating our new record." Savage's own songwriting contributions were influenced by taking the drug acid while attending the gym: "It all started one day when I went to the gym on acid. I just felt like, 'I'm a fucking machine here, I'm killing it'. Something about the psychedelic experience gives you this mind over matter thing. I not only have my wonderful physique to be thankful for, but it also started this songwriting process for me. I guess it could be considered a performance-enhancing drug to some degree."

== Recording ==
To record the album, the band recorded in the Catskill Mountains, in upstate New York, where they had previously worked on Sunbathing Animal (2014) and Human Performance (2016): "It’s an area of sacredness. A magic and fertile place with clean air, mountain water, and a lot of protected land." Working on long, improvised jams that could reach up to 40 minutes in length, the band recorded with several producers during the sessions, but ultimately chose only to include those they worked on with Rodaidh McDonald and John Parish.

During the recording process, the band actively sought to evolve their sound, with co-lead vocalist and guitarist Austin Brown noting: "Being a band for so long, there's lots of bands that can write a Parquet Courts song, and I’ve heard some that were not written by us. That stresses to me how important it is to evolve and move past what might be popularly considered a Parquet Courts sound." The band was influenced by the Primal Scream album, Screamadelica (1991), which fused indie rock with house music, and wanted to recreate the feeling of clubbing culture and nightlife in the studio: "We very much wanted to make a record that embodied a live music experience but more like at a club or party level with DJs, not necessarily a live band. As a live band, we wanted to capture DJ music." Co-lead vocalist and guitarist Andrew Savage, in particular, was inspired by the bands, Can, Canned Heat and This Heat.

Producer Rodaidh McDonald would record the entirety of the band's long jam sessions, which he would then hone into shorter songs. Andrew Savage recalled, "Roddy’s definitely down to burn the midnight oil. I’d go take a nap, and a few hours later I’d come back, and the same song would still be being laboured over. There was an intensity there - that kind of fourth wind you can only get out of extreme energy loss." Despite traditionally playing guitar and keyboards in the band, Austin Brown would often operate a 16-channel dub station instead during the jam sessions, rotating and implementing different effects throughout. Band member Andrew Savage would describe Brown as "the control master of the jam". Regarding working with John Parish on two of the album's tracks, Savage noted: "The reason I wanted to work with him was because he has this remarkable talent of sending a mic directly into a tape machine with no interference of components and making it sound amazing.

Recording of the album had wrapped by March 2020, with the exception of "Marathon of Anger", which was influenced by the Black Lives Matter protests of June 2020 and written and recorded during the events.

== Release ==
With the release of the album delayed due to the ongoing COVID-19 pandemic, the unexpected extra time allowed Andrew Savage to focus on aspects of the release that he otherwise wouldn't have: "You know, one of the saving graces of the whole [pandemic] was this record because, truth be told, I’ve worked on it every day since in some form or another. The album art, I had a ton more time to work on that, and it’s the best I’ve done. And we had time to mix it, we had time to work on these 11 different music videos and these 11 different events to promote the record. I’ve been doing merch and tour posters, this, that, and the other. So I really used this project to focus my attention on something. I’ve always got something to do, but this was a really good way to distract from the hellscape that was 2020."

== Composition ==
Sympathy for Life works in garage rock "designed for the dance-floor", as well as dance-punk and synth-rock sounds. However, among the dance-inspired songs, the quartet's "expected [and] nervy" post-punk sound also appears.

== Critical reception ==
Professional ratings
Aggregate scores
Source	Rating
AnyDecentMusic?	7.6/10
Metacritic	78/100
Review scores
Source	Rating
AllMusic	4/5 stars
DIY	3.5/5 stars
Exclaim!	7/10
The Line of Best Fit	6/10
Mojo	4/5 stars
NME	4/5 stars
Paste	8.4/10
Pitchfork	7.6/10
The Skinny	4/5 stars
Slant Magazine	3.5/5 stars

Sympathy for Life was well received by music critics. On Metacritic, it holds a score of 78 out of 100, indicating "generally favorable reviews", based on 19 reviews.

== Track listing ==
All music is composed by Parquet Courts.

No.	Title	Length
1.	"Walking at a Downtown Pace"	4:46
2.	"Black Widow Spider"	2:50
3.	"Marathon of Anger"	4:35
4.	"Just Shadows"	3:56
5.	"Plant Life"	5:50
6.	"Application/Apparatus"	4:36
7.	"Homo Sapien"	2:55
8.	"Sympathy for Life"	2:50
9.	"Zoom Out"	3:02
10.	"Trullo"	3:01
11.	"Pulcinella"	6:44
Total length:		45:05

Japanese edition (bonus track)
No.	Title	Length
12.	"Watching Strangers Smiles"

== Charts ==
Chart performance for Sympathy for Life
Chart (2021)	Peak position
Australian Albums (ARIA)	26
Belgian Albums (Ultratop Flanders)	49
Belgian Albums (Ultratop Wallonia)	118
Dutch Albums (Album Top 100)	94
German Albums (Offizielle Top 100)	96
Scottish Albums (Official Charts)	14
UK Albums (Official Charts)	42
UK Independent Albums (Official Charts)	4
