= Black Joy =

Black Joy may refer to:

- Black Joy (album), a video album by Psychic TV
- Black Joy (film), a 1977 British film
