= Black Township =

Black Township may refer to:

- Black Township, Posey County, Indiana
- Black Township, Somerset County, Pennsylvania

== See also ==
- Black Town in India
- Blacktown (disambiguation)
- Blackton (disambiguation)
- Black (disambiguation)
- Township (South Africa)
