= Mountain Time (disambiguation) =

The Mountain Time Zone is a time zone in the United States and Canada.

Mountain Time may also refer to:

- "Mountain Time", a song by A. Savage from Several Songs About Fire
- "Mountain Time", a song by Gentle Giant from The Missing Piece
