= Content Nausea =

Studio album by Parkay Quarts
- Released: November 28, 2014
- Genres: Indie rock, post-punk, experimental rock
- Length: 35:00
- Label: What's Your Rupture?

Parkay Quarts chronology
Sunbathing Animal (2014)	Content Nausea (2014)	Monastic Living (2015)

Content Nausea is the fourth studio album by American indie rock band Parquet Courts, released on November 28, 2014 under the name Parkay Quarts. Recorded chiefly by bandmates Andrew Savage and Austin Brown, the album was released less than six months after its predecessor, Sunbathing Animal.

== Background and recording ==
Bass guitarist Sean Yeaton and drummer Max Savage were largely absent from the recording process for Content Nausea, due to Yeaton starting a family and Savage focusing on a mathematics degree.

The album was recorded, mixed and mastered in less than two weeks, on a four-track cassette, by vocalists and guitarists Andrew Savage and Austin Brown.

== Reception ==
Professional ratings
Aggregate scores
Source	Rating
AnyDecentMusic?	7.6/10
Metacritic	76/100
Review scores
Source	Rating
AllMusic	3.5/5 stars
American Songwriter	3/5 stars
Clash	8/10
Consequence	B–
Cuepoint (Expert Witness)	A–
The Line of Best Fit	8.5/10
NME	3.5/5 stars
Pitchfork	7.7/10
PopMatters	7/10
Rolling Stone	3.5/5 stars

In a positive review for Pitchfork, Mike Powell wrote: "Nausea is easier to listen to than Sunbathing Animal in part because it seems less ambitious. Four of its tracks are around a minute long; one is a so-so cover of "These Boots are Made For Walkin’" (itself a punk staple as ubiquitous as the safety pin); one is basically spoken word over noise—a reminder that for all the band’s nervous intensity, they’re basically bookworms."

== Track listing ==
No.	Title	Length
1.	"Everyday It Starts"	2:56
2.	"Content Nausea"	3:04
3.	"Urban Ease"	0:55
4.	"Slide Machine" (The 13th Floor Elevators cover)	4:22
5.	"Kevlar Walls"	0:59
6.	"Pretty Machines"	4:41
7.	"Psycho Structures"	2:53
8.	"The Map"	2:55
9.	"These Boots" (Nancy Sinatra cover)	3:31
10.	"Insufferable"	1:35
11.	"No Concept"	0:43
12.	"Uncast Shadow of a Southern Myth"	6:26
