= Monastic Living =

EP by Parquet Courts
- Released: November 27, 2015
- Genre: Experimental rock
- Length: 32:46
- Language: English
- Label: Rough Trade

Parquet Courts chronology
Content Nausea (2014)	Monastic Living (2015)	Human Performance (2016)

Monastic Living is an EP by the American indie rock band Parquet Courts, released on November 27, 2015, on Rough Trade Records. The release features mostly improvised instrumental and experimental recordings.

== Background and recording ==
Comparing the EP to the band's first studio album, American Specialties (2011), Andrew Savage noted that the release marked a deliberate departure from their previous work: "Monastic Living felt like a cycle in the band starting over again. [Monastic Living and American Specialties] have a very similar relationship in that they are very different sounding than anything else the band has done. [...] It became apparent that we’ve got all this material that is experimental and drone-y and less song-based and more concept-based, so obviously these songs need to have their own record."

The release was mostly improvised by the band, with Savage stating: "The first Parquet Courts practice was me and Austin [Brown] getting together and playing guitar at the same time and stumbling into these ideas. Improvisation has always been part of Parquet Courts. We’ve had songs that have been written onstage, like "Bodies Made Of" was written onstage in Portland. Monastic Living was our first time doing pure improvisation."

== Critical reception ==
Professional ratings
Aggregate scores
Source	Rating
AnyDecentMusic?	4.8/10
Metacritic	56/100
Review scores
Source	Rating
AllMusic	3/5 stars
Consequence	C
DIY	4/5 stars
Exclaim!	6/10
NME	2/5 stars
Paste	6.5/10
Pitchfork	4.9/10
The Skinny	3/5 stars
Spin	7/10
Under the Radar	4/10

In a negative review for Pitchfork, Jazz Monroe criticized the band's change in direction, writing: "The band are touring the album and we can buy it, though I’m unsure why anyone would—perhaps its existence as a paid-for product is part of the statement. What it means for the band’s future is, for now, a mystery, though not the kind it is fun to unravel." In a slightly more positive review, Ben Carney of Exclaim! wrote that "ultimately, the project serves best as a check-in, letting fans know where the band's heads are at after a year on the road. And although both fans and newcomers alike would benefit from a more substantial, cohesive project, it's enough for now."

== Track listing ==
All tracks are written by Parquet Courts.

No.	Title	Length
1.	"No, No, No!"	1:10
2.	"Monastic Living I"	6:25
3.	"Elegy of Colonial Suffering"	1:20
4.	"Frog Pond Plop"	1:32
5.	"Vow of Silence"	5:51
6.	"Monastic Living II"	6:33
7.	"Alms for the Poor"	0:45
8.	"Poverty and Obedience"	1:10
9.	"Prison Conversion"	8:00
Total length:		32:46
