= Black (Norah Jones song) =

Single by Norah Jones

from the album Rome
- Released: 2011
- Genre: Indie rock; folk rock
- Length: 3:32
- Songwriter: Brian Burton

"Black" is a 2011 single sung by Norah Jones and written by Brian Burton for the Spaghetti Western-inspired album Rome by Danger Mouse and Daniele Luppi.

== Media ==
A music video was filmed for the song in 2012. The video's director, Chris Milk, shot the piece with a minimalist crew on a pair of Canon 5D SLR cameras. Milk described the video in Rolling Stone magazine as an "an experiment in raw minimalism."

The director of the "Black" music video, Chris Milk, also created an online interactive experience for the song, titled "3 Dreams of Black"

The song "Black" accompanied the ending of "Face Off", the final episode of Breaking Bad's fourth season.

== Critical reception ==
Complex.com, "The album was inspired by spaghetti westerns (read: Ennio Morricone, the GAWD of all sounds Western) but with Danger Mouse at the helm, the album has a decidedly modern sound," and, ""Black," one of the tracks to feature Norah Jones, follows the aforementioned model well with production that channels a brightly lit dystopian atmosphere. Jones is casted perfectly as she croons with little effort of a world gone asunder."

The Atlantic, "On "Black," Jones channels a sensual femme fatale from decades past. Imagine big landscapes, devastating stakes, and morose characters trapped in a tragedy. The lyrics convey hopeless despair in a casual tone, as Jones sings of being punished for her misdeeds, of dead ends, of being pursued."

Time, "The plaintive guitar, menacing beat and dreamy vocals had me immediately breaking out Shazam to figure out what it was. The track is "Black," from Danger Mouse's 2011 album Rome, with vocals by Norah Jones."

Spin, "A gorgeous slow-burner, with the singer delivering one of her sultriest vocal performances in years over organ washes and lush string orchestration."
