= Blac =

Blac or BLAC may refer to:

- Blaç, a village in Kosovo
- Suzzan Blac (born 1960), English artist
- Beijing Light Automobile Company
- Kimora Blac (born 1988), American drag queen

== See also ==
- Aloe Blacc (born 1979), American musician
