= Wide Awake! =

Studio album by Parquet Courts
- Released: May 18, 2018
- Recorded: Sonic Ranch (Tornillo, Texas); Electric Lady Studios (New York City)
- Genres: Indie rock; punk rock; art punk; dance-punk
- Length: 38:37
- Language: English
- Label: Rough Trade
- Producer: Danger Mouse

Parquet Courts chronology
Milano (2017)	Wide Awake! (2018)	Sympathy for Life (2021)

Singles from Wide Awake!
- 1. "Almost Had to Start a Fight/In and Out of Patience" Released: February 22, 2018; 2. "Wide Awake" Released: March 8, 2018; 3. "Mardi Gras Beads" Released: April 30, 2018; 4. "Total Football" Released: June 8, 2018

Wide Awake! (stylized as WIDE AWAAAAAKE! on the album cover) is the sixth studio album by American indie rock band Parquet Courts, released on May 18, 2018, on Rough Trade Records.

The album was preceded by the singles "Almost Had to Start a Fight/In and Out of Patience", "Wide Awake", and "Mardi Gras Beads", and succeeded by the single "Total Football".

== Background ==
The album was first announced in February 2018 and recorded from December 2017 to January 2018 at Sonic Ranch studios outside Tornillo, Texas. The band recruited Danger Mouse to produce the album, as the band claimed, as a way to push themselves outside of their comfort zone. On recruiting Danger Mouse for the album, Andrew Savage said, "I was writing a record that indebted to punk and funk, and Brian's a pop producer who's made some very polished records. I liked that it didn’t make sense."

In an interview with Billboard, Savage described the album having a funk influence, saying, "there's this duality between joy and anger that I find to be really interesting, and that's something the record kind of deals with at large. ... [H]ardcore could be such an angry music form but could make you feel so positive. There's a lot of moments on the record when all of us are singing at the same time and... that's something I kind of associate with hardcore, or Funkadelic."

Savage characterized opening song, "Total Football", as "a bit like a manifesto; it's got that bold and declarative language, with each line emphasizing the larger ideology". Savage said that the song addresses the "duality of collectivity and individuality", referencing in its title the Total Football system in association football. The title of the album was intended as a "tongue-in-cheek" response to "wokeness". Savage described the closing track, "Tenderness", as being complimentary to the opener, sharing its "manifesto-like" lyrical style. Other songs concern endemic violence, addiction, dysfunction, environmental disaster, and the normalization of these things. Austin Brown said: "In such a hateful era of culture, we stand in opposition to that – and to the nihilism used to cope with that – with ideas of passion and love."

== Critical reception ==
Professional ratings
Aggregate scores
Source	Rating
AnyDecentMusic?	8.3/10
Metacritic	82/100
Review scores
Source	Rating
AllMusic	3.5/5 stars
The A.V. Club	B+
The Independent	5/5 stars
NME	4/5 stars
The Observer	4/5 stars
Pitchfork	8.0/10
Q	4/5 stars
Rolling Stone	4/5 stars
Uncut	8/10
Vice (Expert Witness)	A

Wide Awake! received critical acclaim upon its release. At Metacritic, which assigns a normalized rating out of 100 to reviews from mainstream publications, the album received an average score of 82, based on 28 reviews, indicating "universal acclaim". In a five-star review, Emma Swan of DIY called the album, "a gut-punch of an immediate classic". Writing for Exclaim! magazine, Vish Kanna said that Wide Awake! "is a letter-perfect musical contemplation of modern times, where social uprisings are actually affecting positive change. It's urgent and potent music that's thought-provoking and danceable, and whose rage is measured by a pointed optimism." Roy Trakin, in a rave review for Variety, praised the album for its social conscience in its day and age, stating it "may be the most woke punk-rock record since the heyday of the Clash." Will Hermes in Rolling Stone named Violence as a standout track and described it as "an epic rant about normalized barbarity". In Pitchfork, Mike Powell wrote that at the "heart of the album" is "a tension between the individual and the group, between the angst of freedom and the lull of dependence".

In a more mixed review, Chris Nelson of Mojo wrote that "unsurprisingly, it flies the Wire and Minutemen flags high. More surprising are the occasional nods to funk and '60s bubblegum."

Wide Awake! was named 'album of the year' in an end-of-year list by Australian radio station Double J, and the second-best album of 2018 by Paste. It was named 51st best album of the 2010s by NME.

=== Accolades ===
Accolades for decade
Publication	Accolade	Rank
NME	Top 100 Albums of the 2010s	51

Accolades for year
Publication	Accolade	Rank
EarBuddy	Top 50 Albums of 2018	1
Double J	Top 50 Albums of 2018	1
Drift	Top 100 Albums of 2018	11
Flavorwire	Top 25 Albums of 2018	5
Flood Magazine	Top 25 Albums of 2018	5
Fopp	Top 100 Albums of 2018	13
God Is in the TV	Top 100 Albums of 2018	15
The Music	Top 10 Albums of 2018	2
MusicOMH	Top 50 Albums of 2018	17
NME	Top 100 Albums of 2018	17
No Ripcord	Top 50 Albums of 2018	7
OOR	Top 20 Albums of 2018	15
Paste	Top 50 Albums of 2018	2
The Skinny	Top 50 Albums of 2018	2
Spin	Top 51 Albums of 2018	11
Thrillist	Top 40 Albums of 2018	2
Treble	Top 50 Albums of 2018	17
Under the Radar	Top 100 Albums of 2018	8

== Track listing ==
All tracks are written by Parquet Courts.

No.	Title	Lead vocals	Length
1.	"Total Football"	A. Savage	4:01
2.	"Violence"	A. Savage	4:05
3.	"Before the Water Gets Too High"	A. Savage	4:05
4.	"Mardi Gras Beads"	Brown	2:43
5.	"Almost Had to Start a Fight/In and Out of Patience"	A. Savage	3:14
6.	"Freebird II"	A. Savage	2:55
7.	"Normalisation"	A. Savage	2:11
8.	"Back to Earth"	Brown	3:54
9.	"Wide Awake"	Brown, M. Savage, A. Savage, Yeaton	2:38
10.	"NYC Observation"	A. Savage	1:22
11.	"Extinction"	A. Savage	1:41
12.	"Death Will Bring Change"	Brown	2:42
13.	"Tenderness"	A. Savage	3:06
Total length:			38:37

== Personnel ==
=== Parquet Courts ===
- Austin Brown – guitar, vocals, keyboards on "Death Will Bring Change," "Back to Earth," and "Mardi Gras Beads"
- A. Savage – guitar, vocals, keyboards on "Violence," "Freebird II," "Before the Water Gets Too High"
- Max Savage – percussion, vocals, synthesizer on "Total Football" and "Normalisation"
- Sean Yeaton – bass, vocals

=== Additional personnel ===
- Frank LoCrasto – piano on "Tenderness"
- Eleanor Adams, Minelle Jeddy, Lucie Bismuth Berger, Rita Bochi, Julian Cohen, Mia Nikov, Kofi Dufu, Ava DiFelice, Caden Castro-Kudler, and Ariane Bourdain – additional vocals on "Death Will Bring Change"
- Danger Mouse – production
- Kennie Takahashi – engineering
- Joe LaPorta – mastering
- Claudius Mittendorfer – mixing
- Jonathan Schenke – engineering

== Charts ==
Chart (2018)	Peak position
Australian Albums (ARIA)	93
Belgian Albums (Ultratop Flanders)	42
Belgian Albums (Ultratop Wallonia)	117
New Zealand Heatseeker Albums (RMNZ)	9
Scottish Albums (Official Charts)	19
Swiss Albums (Schweizer Hitparade)	64
UK Albums (Official Charts)	27
US Billboard 200	122
