= Black and pink =

Pink and black, black and pink, pink-black, black-pink, or a variation thereof, may refer to:

- Black and Pink, a United States prison abolitionist organization
- Blackpink, a South Korean girl group
  - Blackpink (EP), a 2017 record by the eponymous K-pop group
- Pink and Black Records, a U.S. record label, an imprint of Fat Wreck Chords
- Dark pink, a color of pink

== See also ==
- Black (disambiguation)
- Pink (disambiguation)
