= Aaron Koblin =

American digital media artist

- Aaron Koblin in 2013
- Born: January 14, 1982 (age 44); Santa Monica, California, U.S.
- Known for: Digital art

Aaron Koblin (born January 14, 1982) is an American digital media artist and entrepreneur best known for his use of data visualization and his work in crowdsourcing, virtual reality, and interactive film. He is co-founder and president of virtual reality company Within (formerly Vrse), founded with Chris Milk. The company created the popular virtual reality fitness app Supernatural, which was acquired by Meta in 2023. Formerly he created and lead the Data Arts Team at Google in San Francisco, California from 2008 to 2015.

== Biography ==
Koblin received his MFA from UCLA's Design | Media Arts MFA program and BA from UC Santa Cruz. He is on the advisory board for the UCLA School of Arts and Architecture, and was previously on the board of the non-profit Gray Area Foundation For The Arts GAFFTA in San Francisco. He was the Abramowitz Artist in Residence at MIT in 2010 and the Annenberg Innovator in residence at USC in 2013.

Koblin's artworks are part of the permanent collections of the Victoria and Albert Museum (V&A), the Museum of Modern Art (MoMA), and the Centre Georges Pompidou. He has presented at TED, and The World Economic Forum, and his work has been shown at international festivals including Ars Electronica, SIGGRAPH, and the Japan Media Arts Festival. In 2006, his Flight Patterns project received the National Science Foundation's first place award for science visualization. In 2009, he was named to Creativity Magazine's Creativity 50, in 2010 he was one of Esquire Magazine's Best and Brightest and Fast Company's Most Creative People in Business, and in 2011 was one of Forbes magazine's 30 under 30. Koblin was an Eyebeam exhibiting artist.

In 2014, Koblin was awarded the National Design Award for Interactive Design.

== Works ==
- The Johnny Cash Project, a music video for Johnny Cash
- This Exquisite Forest, displayed 2012–2013 at Tate Modern
- Radiohead's House of Cards music video with James Frost
- The Wilderness Downtown, for Arcade Fire's We Used to Wait
- Three Dreams of Black, for "Black" on Danger Mouse and Daniele Luppi's album Rome
