= Thawing Dawn =

Studio album by A. Savage
- Released: October 13, 2017
- Genres: Indie rock, alternative, alternative country, noise rock
- Length: 45:57
- Label: Dull Tools

A. Savage chronology
Thawing Dawn (2017)	Several Songs About Fire (2023)

Professional ratings
Review scores
Source	Rating
Exclaim!	6/10
Paste	9.1/10
Pitchfork	7.2/10
Texas Monthly	(favorable)
Tiny Mix Tapes	4/5
Under the Radar	8/10 stars
Vice (Expert Witness)	A–

Thawing Dawn is the first solo studio album by Andrew Savage under the stage name A. Savage, the co-frontman of the New York City-based rock band Parquet Courts. The album was released on October 13, 2017, on the Dull Tools label.

== Track listing ==
1. "Buffalo Calf Road" – 3:30
2. "Eyeballs" – 2:54
3. "Wild, Wild, Wild Horses" – 4:36
4. "Indian Style" – 4:11
5. "What Do I Do" – 7:52
6. "Phantom Limbo" – 3:53
7. "Winter in the South" – 3:21
8. "Ladies from Houston" – 7:03
9. "Untitled" – 3:27
10. "Thawing Dawn" – 5:05
