= Milano (album) =

Studio album by Daniele Luppi and Parquet Courts
- Released: October 27, 2017
- Genre: Art punk; jazz-funk
- Length: 29:58
- Label: 30th Century; Columbia
- Producer: Daniele Luppi

Daniele Luppi chronology
Rome (2014)	Milano (2017)	Charm of Pleasure (2022)

Parquet Courts chronology
Human Performance (2016)	Milano (2017)	Wide Awake! (2018)

Professional ratings
Aggregate scores
Source	Rating
Metacritic	77/100
Review scores
Source	Rating
AllMusic	4/5 stars
And It Don't Stop	A−
DIY	3/5 stars
The Line of Best Fit	8/10
Pitchfork	7.5/10
Tom Hull – on the Web	B+

Milano is a collaborative studio album by Italian composer Daniele Luppi and American rock band Parquet Courts. Produced by Luppi, it was released on October 27, 2017, on 30th Century Records and Columbia Records, and features several lead vocal contributions from Yeah Yeah Yeahs' singer Karen O.

It is a concept album, complete with songs that are fictionalized stories about misfits, fashionistas, outcasts and junkies in mid-1980s Milan. Daniele teamed up with Parquet Courts and Yeah Yeah Yeahs vocalist Karen O to help deliver his vision of an emerging youth culture struggling to be heard amidst the rapid gentrification of old Milan. The song "Soul and Cigarette" is a tribute to Milanese poet Alda Merini.

== Critical reception ==
Reviewing in his "Consumer Guide" column, Robert Christgau regarded the album as a minor work dominated by Andrew Savage's "clever" lyrics and vocal performance.

Publication	Accolade	Year	Rank	Ref.
Rough Trade	Albums of the Year	2017	16	

== Track listing ==
All tracks are written by Daniele Luppi and Parquet Courts.

No.	Title	Length
1.	"Soul and Cigarette"	3:28
2.	"Talisa" (featuring Karen O)	2:20
3.	"Mount Napoleon"	3:26
4.	"Flush" (featuring Karen O)	4:26
5.	"Memphis Blues Again"	3:15
6.	"Pretty Prizes" (featuring Karen O)	3:05
7.	"The Golden Ones" (featuring Karen O)	2:06
8.	"Lanza"	2:47
9.	"Café Flesh"	5:05
