= Sunbathing Animal =

Studio album by Parquet Courts
- Released: June 3, 2014
- Studio: Seaside Lounge, Brooklyn; Outlier Inn, Woodridge
- Length: 46:13
- Label: Mom + Pop; What's Your Rupture? (US); Rough Trade (UK)
- Producer: Jonathan Schenke

Parquet Courts chronology
Tally All the Things That You Broke (2013)	Sunbathing Animal (2014)	Content Nausea (2014)

Singles from Sunbathing Animal
- 1. "Sunbathing Animal" Released: April 1, 2014; 2. "Black & White" Released: May 1, 2014; 3. "Instant Disassembly" Released: May 15, 2014

Sunbathing Animal is the third studio album by the American punk rock band Parquet Courts, released on June 3, 2014, on What's Your Rupture? and Rough Trade Records.

== Recording ==
Sunbathing Animal was recorded in 2013, over the course of three sessions. The first of these sessions yielded the EP, Tally All the Things That You Broke (2013), with vocalist and guitarist Austin Brown stating, “We had to kind of squeeze [recording] in between long runs of touring; whenever we had a couple of weeks off, we’d try to arrange a few days in the studio. The first session more or less produced the EP that we put out last year, Tally All the Things That You Broke; that was all brand new stuff, that we just laid down and got out right off the bat. We had a few more songs back then that we saved for the record, and we put all of it down later last year. It wasn't a stretch at all; we were never rushing to get anything finished."

== Writing and composition ==
The band began writing material for Sunbathing Animal shortly after recording its predecessor, Light Up Gold (2012), with vocalist and guitarist Austin Brown noting: "The truth is, we've been writing new material ever since we wrapped the last one up. If anything, we took our time".

Many of the album's lyrics were written whilst on tour in support of Light Up Gold, with Brown stating: "There’s a few prevailing themes going on, but the major one kind of involves a duality between freedom and captivity; that balance between the freedom that you find in being in a band - or just being a creative person in the world, that’s trying to leave their mark - and then the captivity that goes along with the constraints that you come up against when you’re trying to make shit work, and a lot of the time having it fail. I think [vocalist and guitarist] Andrew [Savage] saw that dichotomy in the story behind the title, and it works well in that respect, because it runs all the way through the record." Brown later elaborated, stating that the album's lyrical content is its most important aspect: "When we started out to make this record, the focus was – more than ever – on the lyrics. They came first in the process and are meant to be right at the front, so that you’re forced to listen to them. I mean, I don’t know if there’s a hook or chorus on the whole record; but that forces the audience to create their own, depending on which lyric pops out to them – so in its own way it becomes the chorus.”

=== Musical style ===
The songs on Animal take on "twitchy" garage rock and "literate" punk rock and shifts between "post-punk propulsion and slower, moodier experiments."

== Critical reception ==
Professional ratings
Aggregate scores
Source	Rating
AnyDecentMusic?	7.6/10
Metacritic	78/100
Review scores
Source	Rating
AllMusic	4/5 stars
The A.V. Club	B+
Cuepoint (Expert Witness)	A−
The Guardian	3/5 stars
The Independent	4/5 stars
Los Angeles Times	3.5/4 stars
NME	8/10
Pitchfork	8.6/10
Rolling Stone	4/5 stars
Spin	8/10

Sunbathing Animal received generally positive reviews from music critics. At Metacritic, which assigns a normalized rating out of 100 to reviews from mainstream critics, the album received an average score of 78, based on 35 reviews. Rolling Stone magazine's Rob Sheffield said the band has evolved musically since Light Up Gold, while Robert Christgau wrote in Cuepoint that "Andrew Savage has succeeded at composing songs with distinct hooks at differing lengths and tempos and constructing an album that reveals more goodies the more you play it." In a less enthusiastic review, Lanre Bakare of The Guardian felt their "twitchy garage-rock tales" about alienated characters make the album sound monotonous.

Pitchfork placed the album at 140 on their list of "The 200 Best Albums of the 2010s".

== Track listing ==
All tracks are written by Parquet Courts.

No.	Title	Length
1.	"Bodies Made Of"	3:21
2.	"Black & White"	3:02
3.	"Dear Ramona"	2:34
4.	"What Color Is Blood?"	3:24
5.	"Vienna II"	1:02
6.	"Always Back in Town"	2:37
7.	"She's Rolling"	6:33
8.	"Sunbathing Animal"	3:52
9.	"Up All Night"	1:02
10.	"Instant Disassembly"	7:12
11.	"Ducking & Dodging"	4:29
12.	"Raw Milk"	3:59
13.	"Into the Garden"	3:00
Total length:		46:13

== Personnel ==
Parquet Courts

- Andrew Savage – vocals, guitar
- Austin Brown – vocals, guitar, keyboards
- Sean Yeaton – bass guitar
- Max Savage – drums, percussion

Additional musicians

- Lea Cho – harmonica (7)

Recording personnel

- Jonathan Schenke – recording, mixing
- Joe Laporta – mastering

Artwork

- Andrew Savage – artwork
