= Tally All the Things That You Broke =

EP by Parquet Courts
- Released: October 8, 2013
- Genre: Garage rock, indie rock, punk rock, post-punk
- Language: English
- Label: What's Your Rupture?

Parquet Courts chronology
Light Up Gold (2012)	Tally All the Things That You Broke (2013)	Sunbathing Animal (2014)

Tally All the Things That You Broke is an EP by the American indie rock band Parquet Courts, released on October 8, 2013 on What's Your Rupture?. Released under the name Parkay Quarts, the EP was recorded during the initial sessions for the band's third studio album, Sunbathing Animal (2014).

Professional ratings
Aggregate scores
Source	Rating
AnyDecentMusic?	7.1/10
Metacritic	72/100
Review scores
Source	Rating
AllMusic	3.5/5 stars
Consequence of Sound	D
Cuepoint (Expert Witness)	A–
Pitchfork	7.5/10
PopMatters	6/10 stars
Rolling Stone	3.5/5 stars

== Track listing ==
All tracks are written by Parquet Courts.

No.	Title	Length
1.	"You've Got Me Wonderin' Now"	2:24
2.	"Descend (The Way)"	2:56
3.	"The More It Works"	5:04
4.	"Fall On Yr Face"	1:25
5.	"He's Seeing Paths"	7:38
