= Light Up Gold =

Studio album by Parquet Courts
- Released: August 18, 2012
- Genre: Indie rock
- Length: 33:06
- Label: Dull Tools; What's Your Rupture?
- Producer: Jonathan Schenke

Parquet Courts chronology
American Specialties (2011)	Light Up Gold (2012)	Tally All the Things That You Broke (2013)

Professional ratings
Aggregate scores
Source	Rating
AnyDecentMusic?	8.0/10
Metacritic	84/100
Review scores
Source	Rating
AllMusic	4.5/5 stars
The Guardian	5/5 stars
The Irish Times	4/5 stars
MSN Music (Expert Witness)	A−
NME	9/10
Pitchfork	8.0/10
Q	4/5 stars
Rolling Stone	4/5 stars
Spin	8/10
Uncut	8/10

Light Up Gold is the second studio album by American indie rock band Parquet Courts, initially released on August 18, 2012 on the lead frontman Andrew Savage's label Dull Tools. It was later released on a larger label, What's Your Rupture?, on January 15, 2013.

== Track listing ==
All tracks are written by Parquet Courts.

No.	Title	Length
1.	"Master of My Craft"	3:10
2.	"Borrowed Time"	2:32
3.	"Donuts Only"	1:21
4.	"Yr No Stoner"	1:50
5.	"Yonder Is Closer to the Heart"	2:59
6.	"Careers in Combat"	1:07
7.	"Light Up Gold I"	0:18
8.	"Light Up Gold II"	1:13
9.	"N Dakota"	2:19
10.	"Stoned and Starving"	5:11
11.	"No Ideas"	2:37
12.	"Caster of Worthless Spells"	1:18
13.	"Disney P.T."	1:12
14.	"Tears O Plenty"	3:16
15.	"Picture of Health"	2:45
Total length:		33:06

== Personnel ==
Parquet Courts

- Andrew Savage – vocals, guitar
- Austin Brown – vocals, guitar
- Sean Yeaton – vocals, bass guitar
- Max Savage – drums, percussion

Recording personnel

- Jonathan Schenke – recording, mixing, mastering
