= Rahim Blak =

Macedonian artist

Rahim Blak is a Macedonian artist.

== Biography ==
Rahim Blak was born in Skopje in Macedonia. He lives and works in Kraków. He studied at the Department of Painting at the Academy of Fine Arts in Kraków. His graduation works, Building investments 2006-2010 as sculptures in public space and Autobiography as Theory of Everything were both supervised by Andrzej Bednarczyk.

== Works ==
- "Excavations" - in the Main Market Square in Krakow (2006)
- "The Holy Picture of Kaaba" - in the National Museum in Krakow (2007)
- "Folia Concept, as an Artistic Formation and the Reactivation of Rahim Blak's Legacy" (since 2006) – performance, sculpture, video (a work in progress)
- "Motivation Letter" – "Projekt Warszawa/Wiener Projekt" – video-performance (a work in progress);
- "For the Brothers from Kosovo" (2006) – video;
- Building Investments as Sculptures in Public Space, including the Centre of Islamic Culture AL-FAN in Kraków, Folia Concept Club, and Siedlisko Niepołomice housing estate (2006-2010)

== Major solo exhibitions ==
- 2005 – Academy of Fine Arts in Krakow Gallery, Academy of Fine Arts in Poznań Gallery – "Ten Thousand"
- 2006 - "XXXVII Wystawa Indywidualna" F.A.I.T Gallery in Kraków
- 2007 - "Projekt Warszawa" Sekcja Magazine’s Gallery, Warsaw
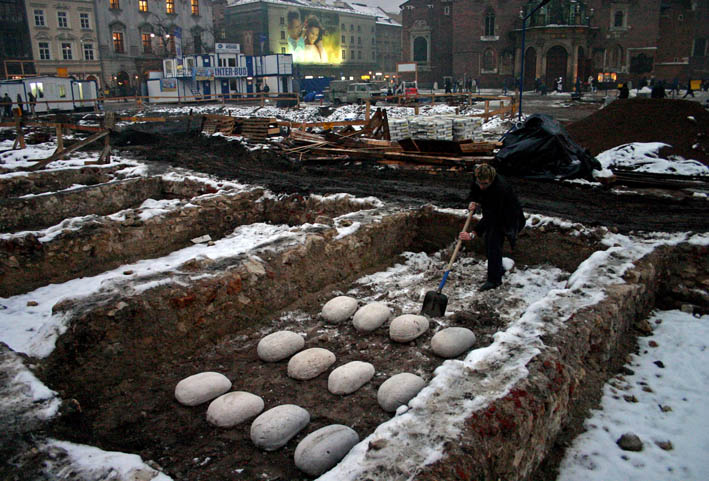
Wykopaliska happening 2005 zakopanie baków pod płytą Rynku Głównego w Krakowie

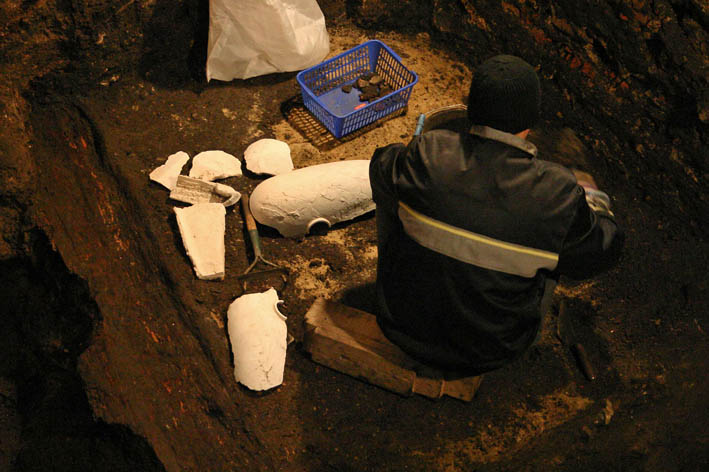
Wykopaliska happening 2005 zakopanie baków pod płytą Rynku Głównego w Krakowie
