= Blackton (surname) =

Blackton is a surname most common in the United States; but there is a high density of people with the last name in Canada as well. Notable people with such a surname include:

- J. Stuart Blackton (1875–1941), English-American film producer, considered the "father of American animation"
- Paula Blackton (1881–1930), American actress
