= Suzzan Blac =

English female painter (born 1960)

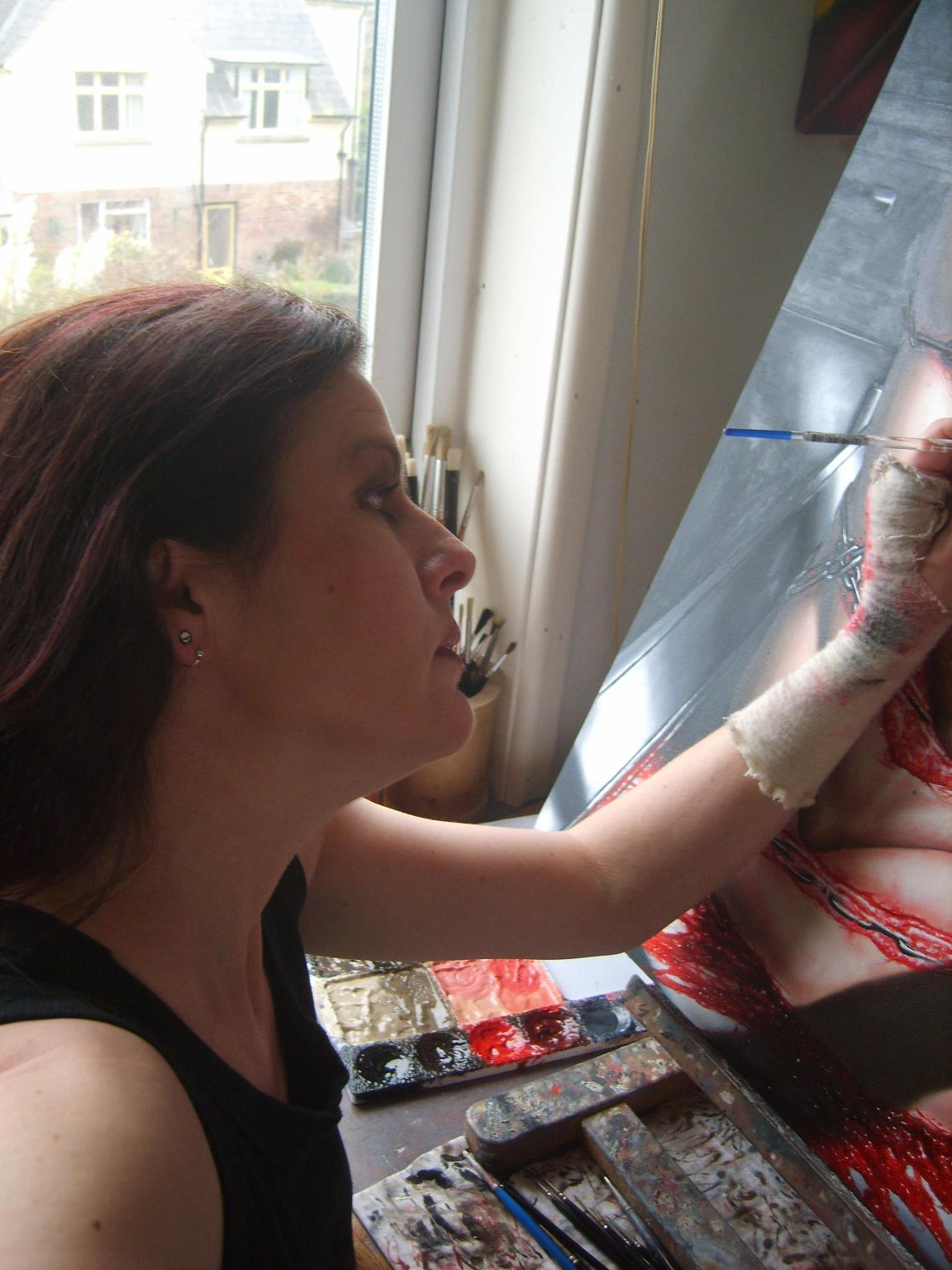
Suzzan Blac painting “Your suffering is real”

Suzzan Blac (born Birmingham, UK, 1960) is an English surreal painter whose work depicts physical, mental and sexual abuse based on personal experience.

== Profile ==
=== Artwork ===
In 2009, Blac exhibited at Resistance Gallery in London, a show entitled "A Basement of Dolls". The exhibition focused on pornography and the body images of girls and women. Her art has also been shown in Berlin.

Her visual art was included in Metamorphosis 2: 50 Contemporary Surreal, Fantastic and Visionary Artists by Jon Beinart, Meg Woodsworth, and Hilary Simmons.

Blac's work is being used in social worker training, and to help abuse-victims in group therapy.

=== Writing ===
An autobiography entitled The Rebirth of Suzzan Blac (Bettie Youngs Books, 2012) tells of the writer's troubled childhood of poverty and sexual abuse and her use of her artwork to heal herself.

Blac contributed "My canvas, my pain, my healing" to Prostitution Narratives: Stories of Survival in the Sex Trade by Melinda Tankard Reist and Caroline Norma.
