= Bläk =

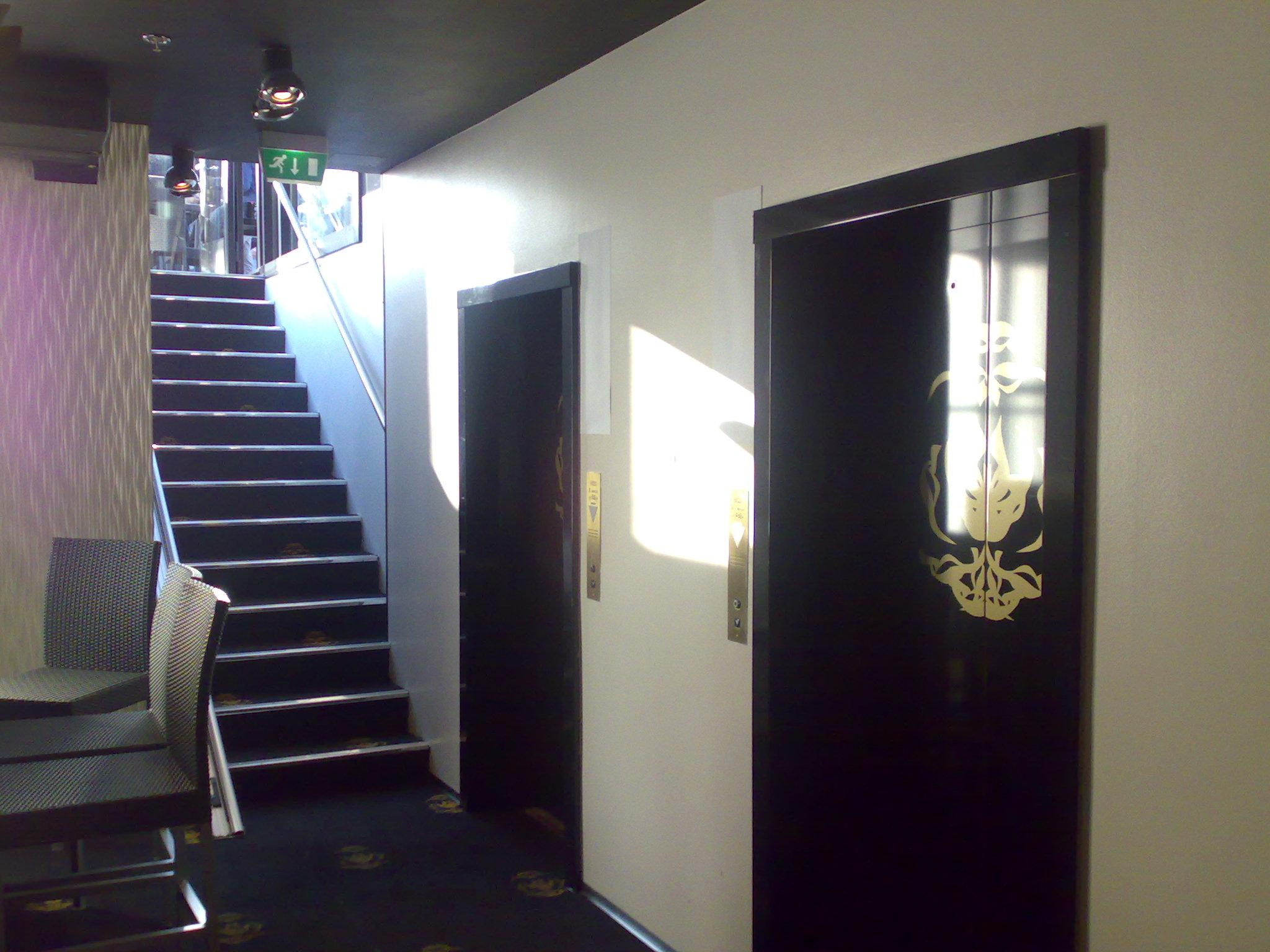
The entrance to Bläk.

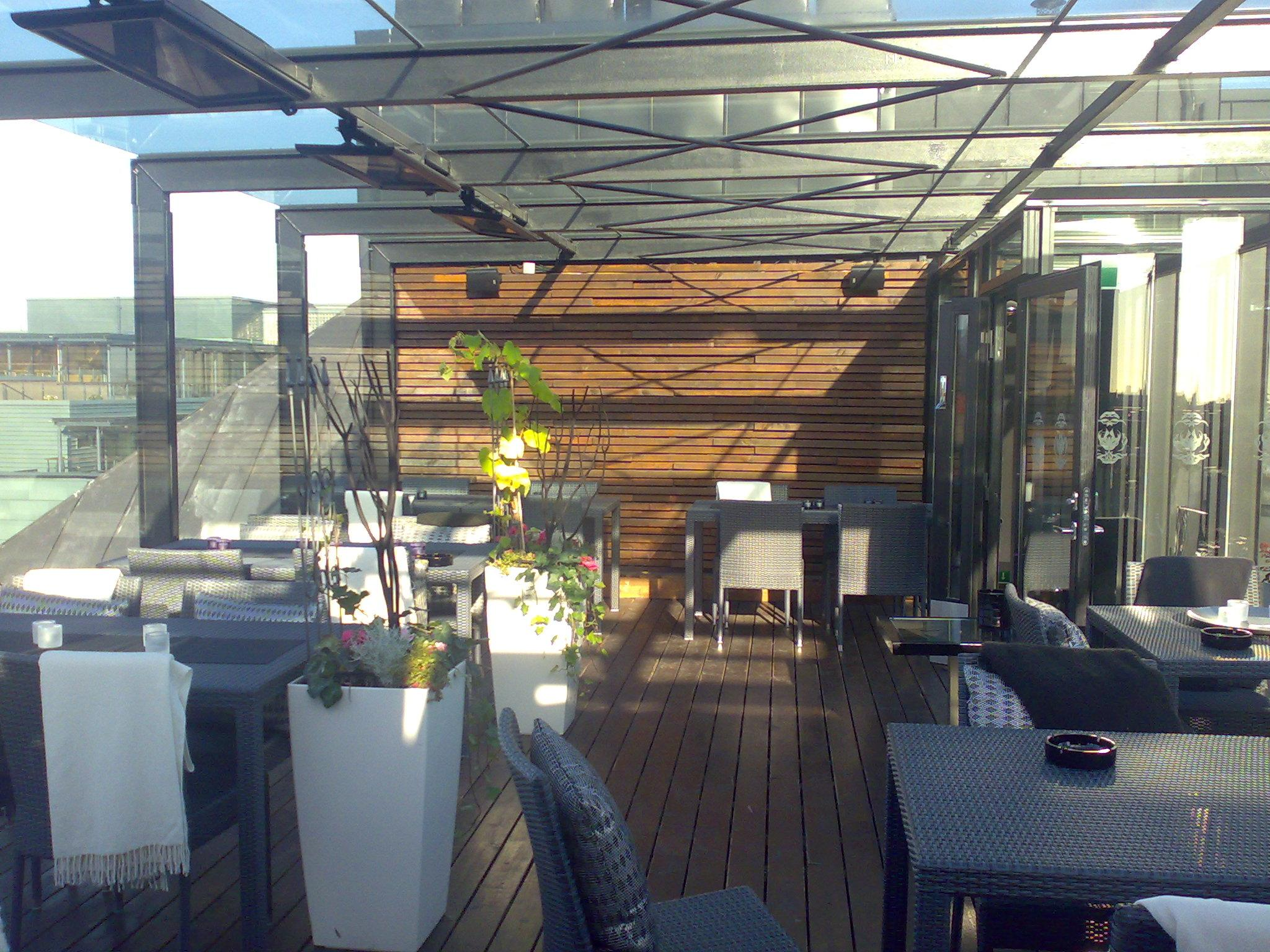
The rooftop terrace of Bläk.

Bläk was a private club and restaurant in Helsinki, Finland that opened in 2007 and closed in 2015. The club was located on the 8th floor of the Koitto house and had a total area of 250 square metres. It also included a partly covered rooftop terrace with an area of 70 square metres. The restaurant, which had 63 seats, was opened on 8 October 2007. The premises had previously hosted the offices of the Koitto Temperance Movement.

The club selected its members. The goal at first was to have 150 to 200 members. By opening day, this goal had already been exceeded. The membership fee in the opening year was 1,220 euros for private members and 3,000 euros for corporate members. In 2010, this was raised to 1,500 euros for private members and 3750 to 4750 euro for corporate members.

The restaurant was the first private club aimed at Finns. It gained publicity through its minority owner Jenni Dahlman-Räikkönen. Membership at the club required recommendation by existing members. Membership in the club offered a VIP taxi call number, a personal chauffeur and various concierge services, such as reservations of flights abroad and organisation of luxurious events.

The operations of Bläk were later handled by Aki Seppänen Club Oy. The operative company had to be changed as the old Bläk had run into financial difficulties. The previous owners had been the marketing company Louder and FS Holding with a total market share of 80%.

The club did not publish its member list. According to press information, its members included at least Susanna Penttilä, Vanessa and Jari Kurri, Emilia and Mikko Leppilampi, Jari Litmanen, Jaana Pelkonen, Kirsi Ylijoki and Eicca Toppinen.

The club closed down in 2015.
