= Boeing Black =

Boeing governmental cellphone

Boeing Black is a secure Android smartphone built by Boeing and BlackBerry Limited, targeted for the United States government and military defense communities as well as people "that need to keep communications and data secure." On February 27, 2014, Boeing filed with the U.S. Federal Communications Commission.

== Features ==
According to Boeing Defense, Space & Security Division, The Black has embedded hardware security features, can be configured through software policies, and has endless modularity capabilities. The phone can self-destruct if it is tampered with, and will feature two slots for SIM cards.

== See also ==
- Boeing Black Smartphone
