= Black (automobile) =

Defunct American motor vehicle manufacturer

Overview
- Manufacturer: C.H. Black Manufacturing Company
- Production: Indianapolis, Indiana
- Model years: 1896 – 1900

Powertrain
- Transmission: 2-speed manual

The C.H. Black Manufacturing Company built the Black phaetons, dos-à-dos and business waggons in 2½ to 8 HP models in Indianapolis, Indiana, from 1896 to 1900. There is some evidence that they built a vehicle as early as 1891. In 1900, the company sold its patents for $20,000.
