= Rome (Danger Mouse and Daniele Luppi album) =

Studio album by Danger Mouse & Daniele Luppi starring Jack White & Norah Jones
- Released: 16 May 2011
- Studio: Forum Studios
- Genre: Indie rock; folk rock; symphonic rock; psychedelic rock
- Length: 35:11
- Label: Parlophone; EMI; Lex; Third Man
- Producer: Danger Mouse; Daniele Luppi

Danger Mouse chronology
Meyrin Fields (2011)	Rome (2011)	El Camino (2011)

Daniele Luppi chronology
Malos Habitos (2011)	Rome (2011)	Milano (2017)

Norah Jones chronology
Here We Go Again (2011)	Rome (2011)	Little Broken Hearts (2012)

Professional ratings
Review scores
Source	Rating
AllMusic	3.5/5 stars
American Music Channel	4/5 stars
BBC	Positive
The Independent	Positive
Los Angeles Times	2.5/4 stars
Metro	4/5 stars
MusicOMH	4/5 stars
NME	8/10 stars
The Observer	3/5 stars
Pitchfork Media	7.0/10.0
Rolling Stone	3.5/5 stars

Rome is an album written by the American music producer Danger Mouse and the Italian composer Daniele Luppi. The album took five years to make and was inspired by the music from Spaghetti Westerns.

The album was recorded using vintage equipment and, as well as featuring musicians who recorded Spaghetti Western soundtracks, also features a reunited Cantori Moderni – the choir put together by Alessandro Alessandroni – that performed on the soundtrack to The Good, the Bad and the Ugly. The album also includes vocals by the American singers Jack White on the tracks "The Rose with the Broken Neck", "Two Against One" and "The World", and Norah Jones on the tracks "Season's Trees", "Black" and "Problem Queen." White additionally chose to provide lyrics for his three songs.

== Track listing ==
All music is composed by Daniele Luppi and Brian Burton.

No.	Title	Lyrics	Length
1.	"Theme of "Rome""		2:21
2.	"The Rose with the Broken Neck"	J. White	3:23
3.	"Morning Fog (interlude)"		0:39
4.	"Season's Trees"	B. Burton	3:12
5.	"Her Hollow Ways (interlude)"		0:57
6.	"Roman Blue"		3:13
7.	"Two Against One"	J. White	2:21
8.	"The Gambling Priest"		2:03
9.	"The World (interlude)"		1:02
10.	"Black"	B. Burton	3:32
11.	"The Matador Has Fallen"		1:47
12.	"Morning Fog"		2:06
13.	"Problem Queen"	B. Burton	2:37
14.	"Her Hollow Ways"		2:30
15.	"The World"	J. White	3:29

== Charts ==
Chart (2011)	Peak position
Canadian Albums Chart	15
UK Albums Chart	20
US Billboard 200	11
US Alternative Albums	5
US Top Rock Albums	5

== Credits ==
=== Musicians ===
- Gegè Munari – Drums and percussion
- Dario Rosciglione – Upright and electric bass
- Luciano Ciccaglioni – Acoustic and electric guitars
- Antonello Vannucchi – Celesta, harpsichord, organ and piano
- Roberto Podio – Percussion
- Gilda Buttà – Celesta and harpsichord
- Cantori Moderni – Choir
- Edda Dell'Orso – Soprano vocals
- Jack White – Vocals ("The Rose with a Broken Neck", "Two Against One" and "The World")
- Norah Jones – Vocals ("Season's Trees", "Black" and "Problem Queen")

=== Recording and arrangements ===
- Danger Mouse – Production, arrangements, mixing
- Daniele Luppi – Production, arrangements, mixing, orchestra and choir conductor
- Fabio Patrignani – Engineer, mixing

== Usage in other media ==
- An interactive web film, Rome: 3 Dreams of Black, was created for the song "Black" by Chris Milk with Aaron Koblin, using HTML5 technology including WebGL as part of Chrome Experiments.
- The song "Black" accompanied the ending of "Face Off", the final episode of Breaking Bad's fourth season.
- The song "Two Against One" peaked number 20 in Billboard Alternative Songs chart and was included on the soundtrack for 2 Guns, the 2013 film directed by Baltasar Kormákur. In 2015, the track was also used for an advertisement of long-running British soap opera Emmerdale to promote the show's big Summer Fate storyline.
