= Within (company) =

Technology company

Within Unlimited, Inc.
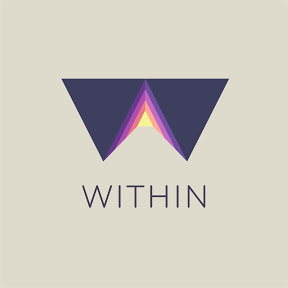
- Formerly: Vrse
- Type: Subsidiary
- Industry: Virtual reality
- Founded: 2014; 12 years ago
- Founders: Chris Milk; Aaron Koblin
- Headquarters: Los Angeles, California
- Key people: Chris Milk (CEO); Aaron Koblin (CTO)
- Products: Supernatural
- Parent: Meta Platforms
- Website: with.in

Within Unlimited, Inc., or commonly Within, is a studio based in Los Angeles developing the VR fitness service Supernatural on the Meta Quest. The company was founded by Chris Milk and Aaron Koblin in 2014 and initially created, acquired, and distributed 360-degree video, AR, and VR experiences across web, mobile, console, and headsets. In February 2023, Meta Platforms Inc. acquired the company.

== History ==
Originally named Vrse, Within was founded in 2014 by Chris Milk and Aaron Koblin, creators of Google’s Data Arts team. The company has produced and distributed augmented and virtual reality works including Clouds Over Sidra, in partnership with the United Nations (2015), Lambchild Superstar (2017), co-directed by Milk and OK Go's Damien Kulash, and the children's augmented reality reading app, Wonderscope (2018). In April 2020, after 2 years in development, Within released Supernatural, a home fitness, health, and wellness service for virtual reality, which combines footage of real-life trainers with rhythm-mapped exercises set in outdoor locations. In 2020, Within was named one of Fast Company's Most Innovative Companies.

In October 2021, Meta Platforms, Inc. agreed to acquire Within for an undisclosed amount. In July 2022, the U.S. Federal Trade Commission sued Meta to block the acquisition, arguing that "Meta could have chosen to try to compete. Instead, it chose to buy." In February 2023, the FTC lost its case against Meta in federal court, allowing Meta to acquire the company. The acquisition was completed the following week, and the FTC announced it would cancel an administrative proceeding against the acquisition later in the same month.

In October 2022, Within sold the Wonderscope app to Amira Learning for an undisclosed amount. In February 2023, the Within app shut down "to focus exclusively on building Supernatural."

=== Investors ===
On June 16, 2016, Within rebranded from Vrse and raised a $12.65 million Series A round led by Andreessen Horowitz, with participation from 21st Century Fox, WME, Tribeca Enterprises, Annapurna Pictures, Vice and Freelands Ventures. Current investors include Andreessen Horowitz, Temasek, Emerson Collective, 21st Century Fox, Raine Ventures, WME, Live Nation, Vice Media, Tribeca Enterprises, Annapurna Pictures, and Legendary Pictures.

In 2017, Within announced raising $40 million in a Series B round of funding led by Temasek and Emerson Collective including funding from existing investors Andreessen Horowitz, 21st Century Fox, and Raine Ventures and new investors WPP and Macro Ventures.

== Awards ==
Within was named the "Number 1" VR app for iOS by Apple Insider, and was the most downloaded and highest-rated cinematic VR app for Google Cardboard.

Within VR films were selected for the Tribeca Film Festival, and chosen for the Sundance Film Festival in both 2015 and 2016. The Within film The Displaced won the 2016 Cannes Lions Grand Prix in the Entertainment category. Within Founder Chris Milk's VR version of the Saturday Night Live 40th Anniversary Special won the Best Online Film & Video Award at the 2016 Webby Awards. In 2020, Within was named one of Fast Company's "Most Innovative Companies".
