= Teenage Cool Kids =

American indie rock group

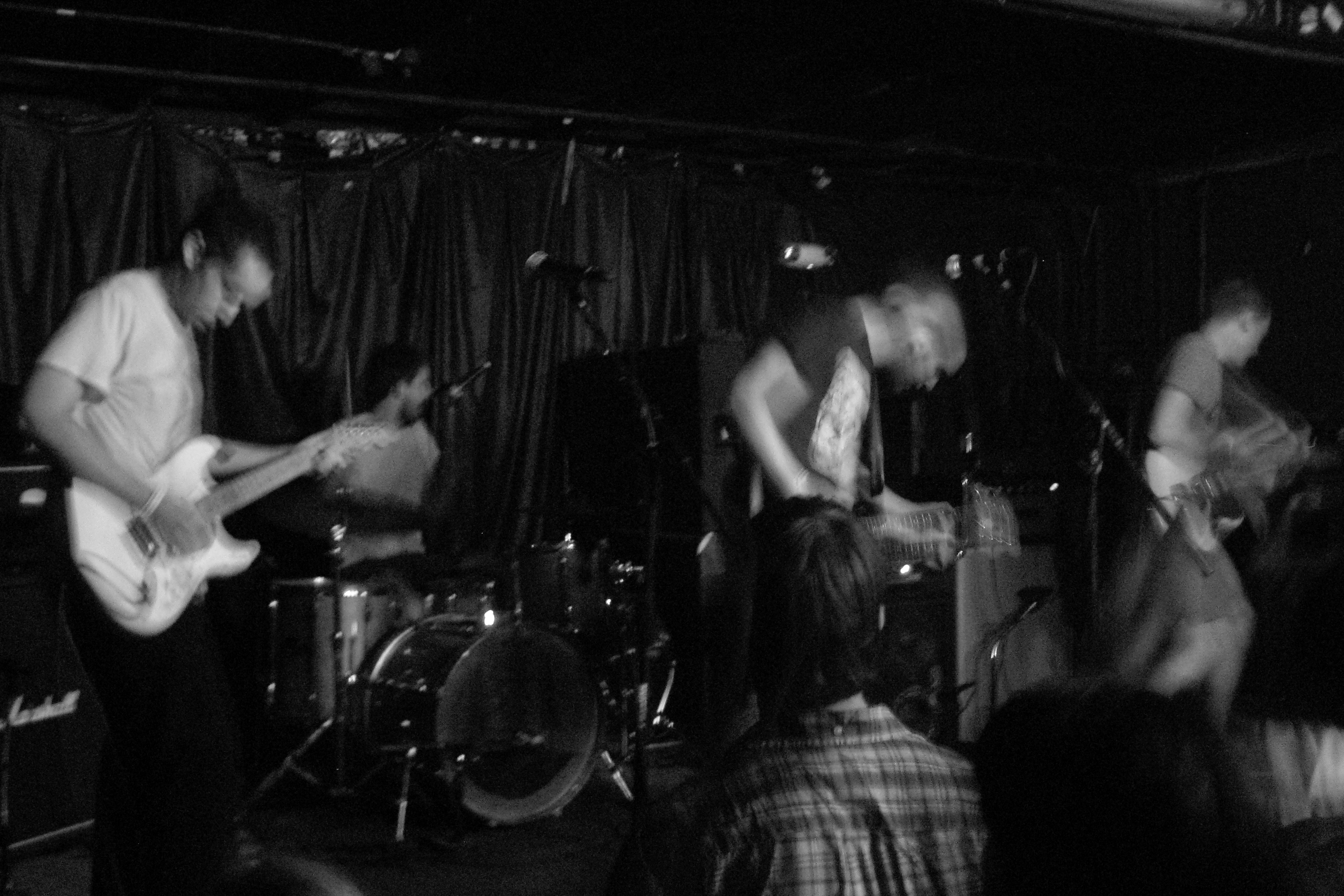

Background information
- Origin: Denton, Texas, U.S.
- Genres: Punk rock; indie rock; lo-fi
- Years active: 2006–2011
- Label: Protagonist Music
- Members: Andrew Savage; Bradley Kerl; Chris Pickering; Daniel Zeigler

Teenage Cool Kids were an American indie rock group from Denton, Texas.

== History ==
Teenage Cool Kids was established in summer 2006 by Andrew Savage, later joined by Daniel Zeigler whom Savage met while attending the University of North Texas in Denton.

The band's earlier material, from the self-released demo and "Remember Me as a Silhouette" 7", was lo-fi, poppy and often compared to early '90s indie rock. The band's first full length was Queer Salutations, released in 2007. Shortly after the release of Queer Salutations, the band embarked on its first tour. The band adhere to a DIY methodology, keeping all recording, songwriting, booking and visual art within the band.

Teenage Cool Kids spent much of 2008 touring the United States and recording their next album. In 2009, the band was issued a cease and desist by Chicago hip-hop duo The Cool Kids over alleged trade mark infringement. The dispute ended with a settlement initiated by the Cool Kids. The dispute delayed the band's second LP release by several months, but in June 2009 Foreign Lands was released by Protagonist Music.

The group officially disbanded in 2011, shortly after the release of their final album, Denton After Sunset. Savage had previously formed Parquet Courts in 2010.

== Discography ==
=== Albums ===
- Queer Salutations, 2007, Protagonist
- Foreign Lands, 2009, Protagonist
- Denton After Sunset, 2011, Dull Tools

=== Singles ===
- Remember Me As a Silhouette, 2007, C&C Music Factory
- Speaking in Tongues b/w Crucial Talk, 2009, Copper Lung
- Poison Sermons, 2009, Leroy St. Records

== See also ==
- Musicians from Denton, Texas
- Parquet Courts
