= American Specialties =

Studio album by Parquet Courts
- Released: 2011
- Recorded: 2011, New York City
- Genre: Indie rock
- Length: 27:27
- Label: Cut the Cord That... Records (cassette); Play Pinball! Records (vinyl)
- Producer: Parquet Courts

Parquet Courts chronology
American Specialties (2011)	Light Up Gold (2012)

American Specialties is the debut studio album by American indie rock band Parquet Courts, initially released in 2011 as a limited edition cassette on Cut the Cord That... Records. A vinyl version of the album was subsequently released on Pinball! Records in 2012.

The album was partly mixed by Woods multi-instrumentalist Jarvis Taveniere.

== Recording ==
In 2016, vocalist and guitarist Andrew Savage noted that the album stands mostly alone within the band's discography, in terms of its songwriting and overall aesthetic: "There’s a lot of stuff on American Specialties that didn’t really get revisited in the band, although its essence has informed everything the band has done."

== Release ==
Regarding American Specialties initial release on cassette, vocalist and guitarist Andrew Savage noted, "Cassettes force you to be patient and digest what you're listening to. People that are curious and go out and search for music are listening to cassettes because maybe there's only a hundred of them – and that's all the more incentive because they'd like to hear it before it becomes completely unavailable. I like to reward people's curiosity."

== Track listing ==
All tracks are written by Parquet Courts.

Side A
No.	Title	Length
1.	"Her Boyfriend's Band"	1:12
2.	"Food Stamps Office"	1:17
3.	"Mezzanine"	2:31
4.	"American Specialties"	1:21
5.	"Other Desert Cities"	6:31

Side B
No.	Title	Length
1.	"Square States"	2:53
2.	"College Chess Circuit"	3:49
3.	"Nation of Islam: Nunavut"	1:46
4.	"Largish/Dominant"	2:58
5.	"A.M. Reprise (Rebellious Outtake)"	0:41
6.	"Tidal Hisses"	2:28

== Personnel ==
Parquet Courts

- Austin Brown – vocals, guitar
- Andrew Savage – vocals, guitar
- Sean Yeaton – bass guitar
- Max Savage – drums

Recording personnel

- Parquet Courts – recording
- Jarvis Taveniere – mixing
- Jason Kelly – mixing
- David Willingham – mastering
