= Several Songs About Fire =

Studio album by A. Savage
- Released: October 6, 2023
- Length: 46:06
- Label: Rough Trade
- Producer: John Parish

A. Savage chronology
Thawing Dawn (2017)	Several Songs About Fire (2023)

Several Songs About Fire is the second solo studio album by Andrew Savage under the stage name A. Savage, released on October 6, 2023, through Rough Trade Records. It was preceded by the lead single "Elvis in the Army".

== Critical reception ==
Professional ratings
Aggregate scores
Source	Rating
Metacritic	72/100
Review scores
Source	Rating
Loud and Quiet	8/10
Mojo	3/5 stars
Pitchfork	7.4/10
Uncut	7/10

Several Songs About Fire received a score of 72 out of 100 on review aggregator Metacritic based on five critics' reviews, indicating "generally favorable" reception. Zara Hedderman of Loud and Quiet called the album "even more engaging than its predecessor" Thawing Dawn (2017), commenting that "the songs are densely (but deftly) penned, and his unhurried performance draws you closer in regardless of him sharing mundane details of a popcorn dinner or stark revelations about himself". Shaad D'Souza of The Saturday Paper described the album as "sharply attuned to the indignities of modern life", writing that "Savage is still more able than most songwriters in his milieu to write specifically and literally about 21st-century culture without resorting to hoary metaphors".

Reviewing the album for Pitchfork, Ryan Leas wrote that the album "plays less like an anxious lifeboat and more like a meditative breadcrumb trail from an old life to a new one, destination unknown" and that there is "nothing shaggy" about the music, as "most songs unspool slowly and with intent, as Savage takes time to refine both his melodies and his images". Mojo felt that it "traces lines to both Bill Callahan's downbeat philosophising and Jonathan Richman's crafted wit and primal rock'n'roll chug", while Uncut found there to be "subtle dynamic shifts and spikes throughout".

== Track listing ==
All tracks are written by Andrew Savage.

Several Songs About Fire track listing
No.	Title	Length
1.	"Hurtin' or Healed"	6:01
2.	"Elvis in the Army"	3:37
3.	"Le Grand Balloon"	6:09
4.	"My My My Dear"	5:01
5.	"Riding Cobbles"	1:52
6.	"Mountain Time"	5:23
7.	"David's Dead"	4:01
8.	"Thanksgiving Prayer"	4:53
9.	"My New Green Coat"	5:46
10.	"Out of Focus"	3:23
Total length:		46:06

== Personnel ==
- John Parish – production, mixing
- Heba Kadry – mastering
- Oliver Baldwin – mixing, engineering
- Jonathan Schenke – engineering (track 2)

== Charts ==
Chart performance for Several Songs About Fire
Chart (2023)	Peak position
UK Independent Albums (OCC)	20
