= Black Joy (album) =

Video by Psychic TV
- Released: 3 August 2004
- Length: 105 min

Psychic TV Official Video chronology
Time's Up Live (2001)	Black Joy (2004)

Black Joy is a DVD by Psychic TV. The DVD includes live and music videos. The DVD is composed of two prior VHS projects, Black and Joy.

== Chapters ==
Joy

1. "Your Body"
2. "We Kiss"
3. "She Was Surprised"
4. "RU Xperienced"
5. "Candy Says"
6. "Wicked"
7. "Just Like Arcadia"
8. "Joy"
9. "IC Water (promo)"

Black

10. "Intoxication"
11. "Surrender"
12. "Horror House"
13. "Jigsaw"
14. "Money For E"
15. "Black"
