= Human Performance =

Studio album by Parquet Courts
- Released: April 8, 2016
- Studio: Dreamland (Hurley, New York)
- Genre: Indie rock; art punk; experimental rock; post-punk; garage rock
- Length: 42:20
- Language: English
- Label: Rough Trade

Parquet Courts chronology
Monastic Living (2015)	Human Performance (2016)	Milano (2017)

Singles from Human Performance
- 1. "Dust" Released: February 4, 2016; 2. "Berlin Got Blurry" Released: February 25, 2016; 3. "Outside" Released: March 24, 2016; 4. "Human Performance" Released: April 6, 2016

Professional ratings
Aggregate scores
Source	Rating
AnyDecentMusic?	7.9/10
Metacritic	82/100
Review scores
Source	Rating
AllMusic	4/5 stars
The A.V. Club	A−
Entertainment Weekly	A−
The Guardian	4/5 stars
NME	4/5
Pitchfork	8.4/10
Q	4/5 stars
Rolling Stone	4/5 stars
Spin	8/10
Vice	A

Human Performance is the fifth studio album by American indie rock band Parquet Courts, released on April 8, 2016 on Rough Trade Records.

The album was preceded by the singles "Dust", "Berlin Got Blurry", "Outside", and "Human Performance". It received a nomination for Best Recording Package at the 2017 Grammy Awards.

== Background and recording ==
The band wrote much of Human Performance while recording the album at Dreamland Recording Studios in Hurley, New York, New York: "We were living there, working around the clock, and there was never any time where we couldn’t be loud. It created an environment where we all encouraged each other to explore." Vocalist and guitarist Andrew Savage likened the experience to recording The Beatles' White Album: "I imagine it’s what recording [that album] would’ve been like except the whole band was getting along and nobody’s girlfriend was there."

== Artwork ==
Receiving a nomination for Best Recording Package at the 2017 Grammy Awards, the album's artwork is by co-lead vocalist and guitarist A. Savage. Regarding its cover art, Savage noted: "I painted that in my own separate state of mind. I do a lot of artwork that has nothing to do with Parquet Courts, but it was around the same time that I started working on the Human Performance art, and it kind of just started screaming at me from the corner. It became apparent that it needed to be included, because so many of the same emotions were embedded within that painting were [also] within the lyrics of the record."

== Accolades ==
Publication	Accolade	Year	Rank	Ref.
Paste	The 50 Best Albums of 2016	2016	20	
Pitchfork	The 20 Best Rock Albums of 2016	2016	—	
Pitchfork	The 50 Best Albums of 2016	2016	26	
Rolling Stone	50 Best Albums of 2016	2016	17	
The Skinny	Top 50 Albums of 2016	2016	9	

== Track listing ==
All tracks are written by Parquet Courts.

No.	Title	Lead vocals	Length
1.	"Dust"	Brown and Savage	3:57
2.	"Human Performance"	Savage	4:15
3.	"Outside"	Savage	1:45
4.	"I Was Just Here"	Yeaton, Savage and Brown	1:48
5.	"Paraphrased"	Savage	3:01
6.	"Captive of the Sun"	Brown	2:03
7.	"Steady on My Mind"	Brown	3:38
8.	"One Man No City"	Brown	6:24
9.	"Berlin Got Blurry"	Savage	3:26
10.	"Keep It Even"	Brown	2:47
11.	"Two Dead Cops"	Savage	3:05
12.	"Pathos Prairie"	Savage	2:51
13.	"It's Gonna Happen"	Savage, Yeaton	3:20
Total length:			42:20

Digital bonus track
No.	Title	Lead vocals	Length
14.	"Already Dead"	Brown	3:51
Total length:			46:11

== Personnel ==
Parquet Courts

- Austin Brown - guitar, keys, vocals
- A. Savage - guitar, car, vocals
- Max Savage - drums, percussion, vocals
- Sean Yeaton - bass, vocals

Additional musicians:

- D. Crystal - flute on "Human Performance"
- Jeff Tweedy - additional guitar on "Dust" and "Keep it Even"
- Justin Pizzoferrato - additional car horn
- Jeff Tweedy appears courtesy of dBpm Records and Anti-

== Charts ==
Chart (2016)	Peak position
Belgian Albums (Ultratop Flanders)	100
French Albums (SNEP)	109
UK Albums (OCC)	50
US Billboard 200	118
