= Daniele Luppi =

Italian composer, musician and producer (born 1972)

- Born: 1 January 1972 (age 54); Padua, Veneto, Italy
- Occupations: Record producer; artist; musician
- Instruments: Piano; organ; electric bass; trumpet; Clavinet; Optigan; Minimoog; tubular bells
- Years active: 1996–present
- Labels: Rhino; Ipecac

Daniele Luppi (born 1 January 1972) is an Italian film composer, television composer, and record producer. He has been nominated for two Emmy Awards and has collaborated with artists including the Red Hot Chili Peppers, Gnarls Barkley, Depeche Mode, Danger Mouse, Jack White, and John Legend.

== Biography ==
Luppi has scored several films, including the American comedy Assassination of a High School President, starring Bruce Willis, and the Mexican independent film Bad Habits. In 2014 and 2015, he received Emmy nominations for "Outstanding Original Main Title Theme Music" for his work on STARZ's Magic City and Netflix's Marco Polo, respectively.

Luppi has also released a series of albums inspired by different eras of Italian music. His first album, An Italian Story, was published in 2004 and draws influence from vintage 1960s and 1970s soundstage compositions, while featuring contributions from members of Marc 4. A later album, Rome, published in 2011, features collaborations with Jack White, Norah Jones, and Danger Mouse. MILANO, Luppi's 2017 album, features Karen O and Parquet Courts and focuses on Luppi's experiences in Milan during the 1980s, offering a reflection on the city's cultural and social atmosphere during that period.

Luppi has written collaborative arrangements for The Getaway by the Red Hot Chili Peppers, Gnarls Barkley's debut St. Elsewhere, and the self-titled album from Broken Bells. Additionally, he contributed string arrangements to Dave Gahan and Soulsavers' Imposter, John Legend's Once Again and Get Lifted, and Mike Patton's Mondo Cane.

== Solo discography ==
Album	Label	Collaborators
Charm of Pleasure EP (2022)	Verve	Greg Gonzalez
Milano (2017)	30th Century Records / Columbia	Parquet Courts, Karen O
Feriado [OST] (2015)	Belmondo	
Rome (2011)	Capitol	Danger Mouse, Jack White, Norah Jones
Bad Habits [OST] (2010)	Ipecac	
An Italian Story (2004)	Rhino	

== Other appearances ==
Artist	Album	Notes
Broken Bells	After the Disco	String arrangements, string conductor
Broken Bells	Broken Bells	String conductor, string arrangements
CeeLo Green	"Piece Of My Heart" (Live Recording)	Producer, arranger
Danger Mouse / Karen O	Lux Prima	String arrangements, string conductor
Danger Mouse / Sparklehorse	Dark Night of the Soul	Arranger, clavioline, keyboards, programmer, string arrangements, strings
Dave Gahan / Dave Gahan & the Soulsavers	Angels & Ghosts	Horn arrangements, string arrangements
Gnarls Barkley	The Odd Couple	Arranger, conductor
Gnarls Barkley	St. Elsewhere	Arranger, organ, synthesizer bass, Minimoog, orchestration, synthesizer orchestration, organ arrangement, trumpet arrangement, bass arrangement
John Legend	Once Again / Get Lifted	Arranger, string arrangements
Red Hot Chili Peppers	The Getaway	String arrangements, string conductor
Soulsavers	The Light the Dead See	String arrangements
Soulsavers	Broken	String arrangements

== Filmography ==
=== Composer ===
The Outside Netflix’s Cabinets of Curiosities (2026)

Mona Lisa and the Blood Moon (2021)

Tyger Tyger (2020)
Feriado (2014)
Assassination of a High School President (2008)
Bad Habits (2007)
One Night with You (2006)
Pink Punch (2004)
Showboy (2002)
The Woman Chaser (1999)

=== Soundtrack ===
Undateable John (2019)	"The Gambling Priest"
The Lego Movie (2014)	Additional score arrangement
2 Guns (2013)	"Two Against One"
Big Mommas: Like Father, Like Son (2011)	"String Suite Giga"
Nine (2009)	"Quando Quando Quando"
The Nines (2007)	"Chopin Nocturne, 1 Opus 32"
Inside Deep Throat (2005)	"Fashion Party"
Under the Tuscan Sun (2003)	"Fashion Party"
Showboy (2002)	"Fashion Party", "Photochic", "Hypermodels"
Everything Put Together (2000)	"La Nudista"
Red Silk (1999)	"La Nudista"

== Television ==
=== Composer ===
Marco Polo (2014) (Netflix)	Composer (theme music)
Magic City (2012–2013) (Starz)	Composer (theme music), conductor, orchestration, producer

=== Soundtrack ===
I Am Groot (Disney+) (2022–2023)	10 episodes
How To Make It in America (HBO) (2011)	S2 - E8 "The Gambling Priest"
Breaking Bad (AMC) (2011)	S4 - E13 "Face Off"
Sex and the City (HBO) (2002)	S5 - E5 "Fashion Party"
