= Gnarls Barkley discography =

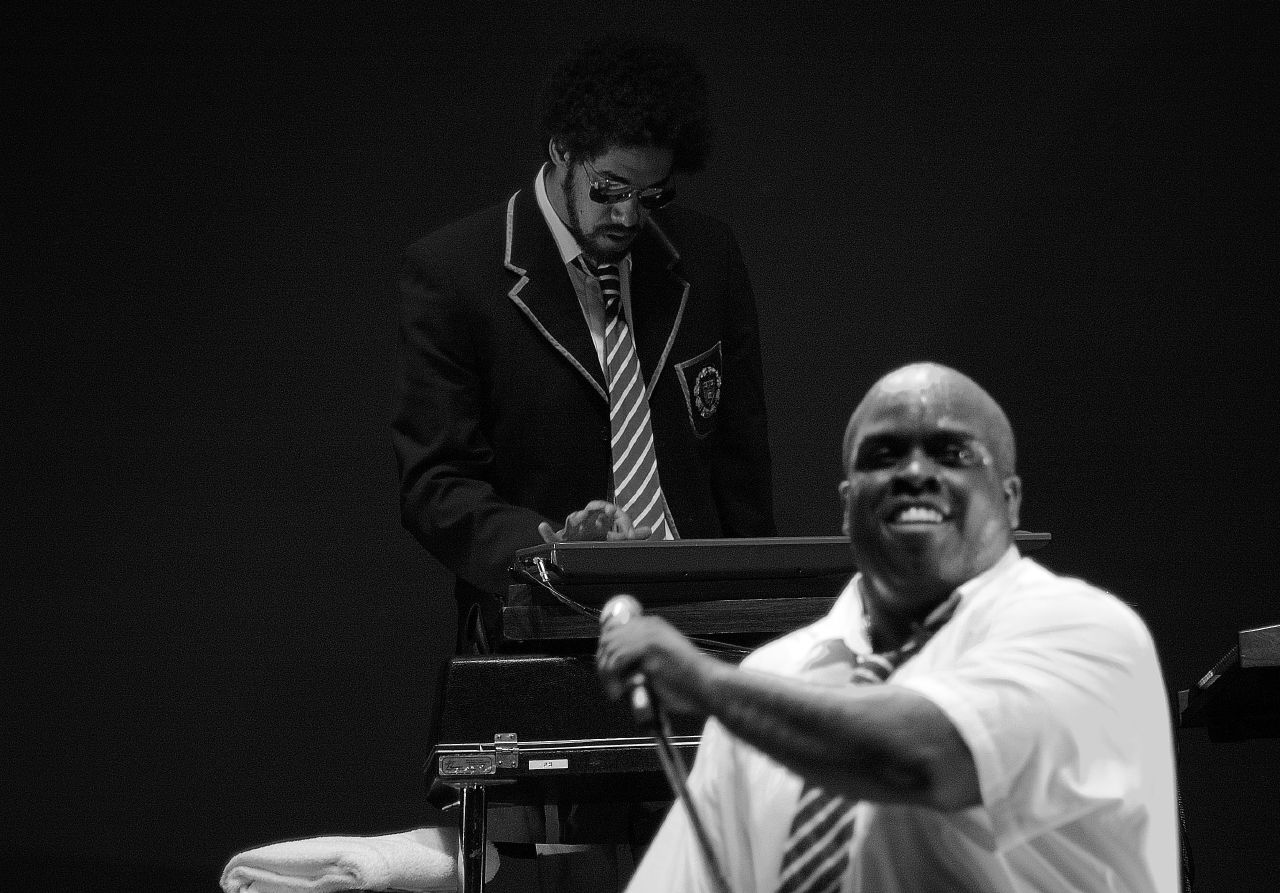
- Gnarls Barkley during a performance in Australia in 2007
- Studio albums: 3
- Extended plays: 2
- Singles: 7
- Music videos: 7

The discography of Gnarls Barkley, an American alternative hip-hop duo composed of record producer Danger Mouse and soul singer Cee Lo Green, consists of three studio albums, two extended plays, seven singles and seven music videos. The duo originally met in the late 1990s, and began to record music together in 2003 following the release of Danger Mouse's 2003 album Ghetto Pop Life. Their first single, "Crazy", was released in 2006; it achieved worldwide chart success, reaching number two on the US Billboard Hot 100 – where it was certified double platinum by the Recording Industry Association of America (RIAA) – and reaching the top ten of the Australian, New Zealand and Swiss singles charts, among others. It also topped the UK Singles Chart, attracting considerable attention for becoming the first song ever to top the chart on digital download sales alone, following a change to the chart's eligibility rules allowing songs to chart purely on digital sales providing that it was given a physical release the following week. The song appeared on Gnarls Barkley's debut studio album, St. Elsewhere, which peaked at number four on the US Billboard 200 as well as topping the New Zealand and United Kingdom albums charts. Three further singles – "Smiley Faces", which reached the top ten of the UK and Irish singles charts, "Who Cares?" and a cover of the Violent Femmes song "Gone Daddy Gone" – were released from St. Elsewhere, although none of them appeared on the Billboard Hot 100.

Gnarls Barkley's second studio album, The Odd Couple, was released on March 18, 2008 in the United States. Although it is stylistically similar to St. Elsewhere, The Odd Couple did not achieve the same commercial success as its predecessor, reaching number 12 on the Billboard 200 and the top 20 of a select few worldwide album charts. None of the singles from The Odd Couple matched the worldwide success of "Crazy": "Run (I'm a Natural Disaster)", The Odd Couple's first single, achieved minor success on several European singles charts, and "Going On", the second single, reached number 88 on the Billboard Hot 100. The album also spawned the single "Who's Gonna Save My Soul", which failed to appear on any major national chart.

On February 26, 2026, the duo released the single "Pictures", with the announcement of their third and final album, Atlanta, to be released on March 6, 2026. It is their first new music to be released in 18 years.

== Albums ==
=== Studio albums ===
List of studio albums, with selected chart positions, sales figures and certifications
Title	Album details	Peak chart positions										Sales	Certifications
Title	Album details	US	AUS	CAN	FRA	GER	IRL	NLD	SWE	SWI	UK	Sales	Certifications
St. Elsewhere	Released: May 9, 2006 (US); Label: Downtown, Atlantic; Formats: CD, LP, digital download	4	6	8	3	6	4	7	9	2	1	US: 1,345,000	RIAA: 2× Platinum; ARIA: Platinum; BPI: 2× Platinum; BVMI: Gold; IFPI SWI: Platinum; IRMA: Platinum; MC: Platinum; SNEP: Gold
The Odd Couple	Released: March 18, 2008 (US); Label: Downtown, Atlantic; Formats: CD, LP, digital download	12	20	21	63	58	31	60	59	16	19	US: 250,000	
Atlanta	Released: March 6, 2026; Label: 10K Projects, Atlantic; Formats: CD, LP, digital download	—	—	—	—	—	—	—	—	—	—		
"—" denotes a recording that did not chart.

== Extended plays ==
List of extended plays, with selected information
Title	EP details
iTunes Live from Soho	Released: August 12, 2008 (US); Label: Downtown, Atlantic; Formats: CD, digital download
Who's Gonna Save My Soul	Released: November 25, 2008 (US); Label: Downtown, Atlantic; Formats: CD, digital download

== Singles ==
List of singles, with selected chart positions and certifications, showing year released and album name
Title	Year	Peak chart positions										Certifications	Album
Title	Year	US	AUS	BEL	FRA	GER	IRL	NLD	SWE	SWI	UK	Certifications	Album
"Crazy"	2006	2	2	3	3	3	1	3	4	1	1	RIAA: 8× Platinum; ARIA: Gold; BPI: 4× Platinum; BRMA: Gold; BVMI: 3× Gold; IFPI SWE: Platinum; IFPI SWI: Gold	St. Elsewhere
"Smiley Faces"	2006	—	38	33	—	32	9	47	57	37	10	BPI: Silver	St. Elsewhere
"Who Cares?" / "Gone Daddy Gone" (Note: "Who Cares?" and "Gone Daddy Gone" charted as a double A-side single in the United Kingdom.)	2006	—	—	—	—	—	—	—	—	—	60		St. Elsewhere
"Who Cares?" / "Gone Daddy Gone"	2006	—	90	—	—	84	—	—	—	— (Note: "Gone Daddy Gone" did not enter the Swiss Singles chart, but charted at number 82 on the Swiss Airplay chart.)	60		St. Elsewhere
"Run (I'm a Natural Disaster)"	2008	— (Note: "Run (I'm a Natural Disaster)" did not enter the Billboard Hot 100, but peaked at number 14 on the Bubbling Under Hot 100 Singles chart, which acts as an extension to the Hot 100.)	—	— (Note: "Run" did not enter the Flanders Ultratop 50, but peaked at number six on the Ultratip chart.)	—	72	—	—	—	65	32		The Odd Couple
"Going On"	2008	88	79	—	— (Note: "Going On" did not enter the France Singles chart, but peaked at number four on the France Digital Song Sales chart.)	—	—	—	—	— (Note: "Going On" did not enter the Swiss Singles chart, but charted at number 77 on the Swiss Airplay chart.)	143		The Odd Couple
"Who's Gonna Save My Soul"	2008	— (Note: "Who's Gonna Save My Soul" did not enter the Billboard Hot 100, but peaked at number 14 on the Hot Singles Sales chart.)	—	—	—	—	—	—	—	—	—		The Odd Couple
"Pictures"	2026	—	—	—	—	—	—	—	—	—	—		Atlanta
"—" denotes a recording that did not chart or was not released in that territory.

== Music videos ==
List of music videos, with directors, showing year released
Title	Year	Director(s)
"Crazy"	2006	Robert Hales
"Smiley Faces"	2006	Robert Hales
"Gone Daddy Gone"	2006	Chris Milk
"Run (I'm a Natural Disaster)"	2008	Happy
"Going On"	2008	Wendy Morgan
"Who's Gonna Save My Soul"	2008	Chris Milk
"Mystery Man"	2008	Walter Robot
