= List of awards and nominations received by CeeLo Green =

CeeLo Green awards and nominations
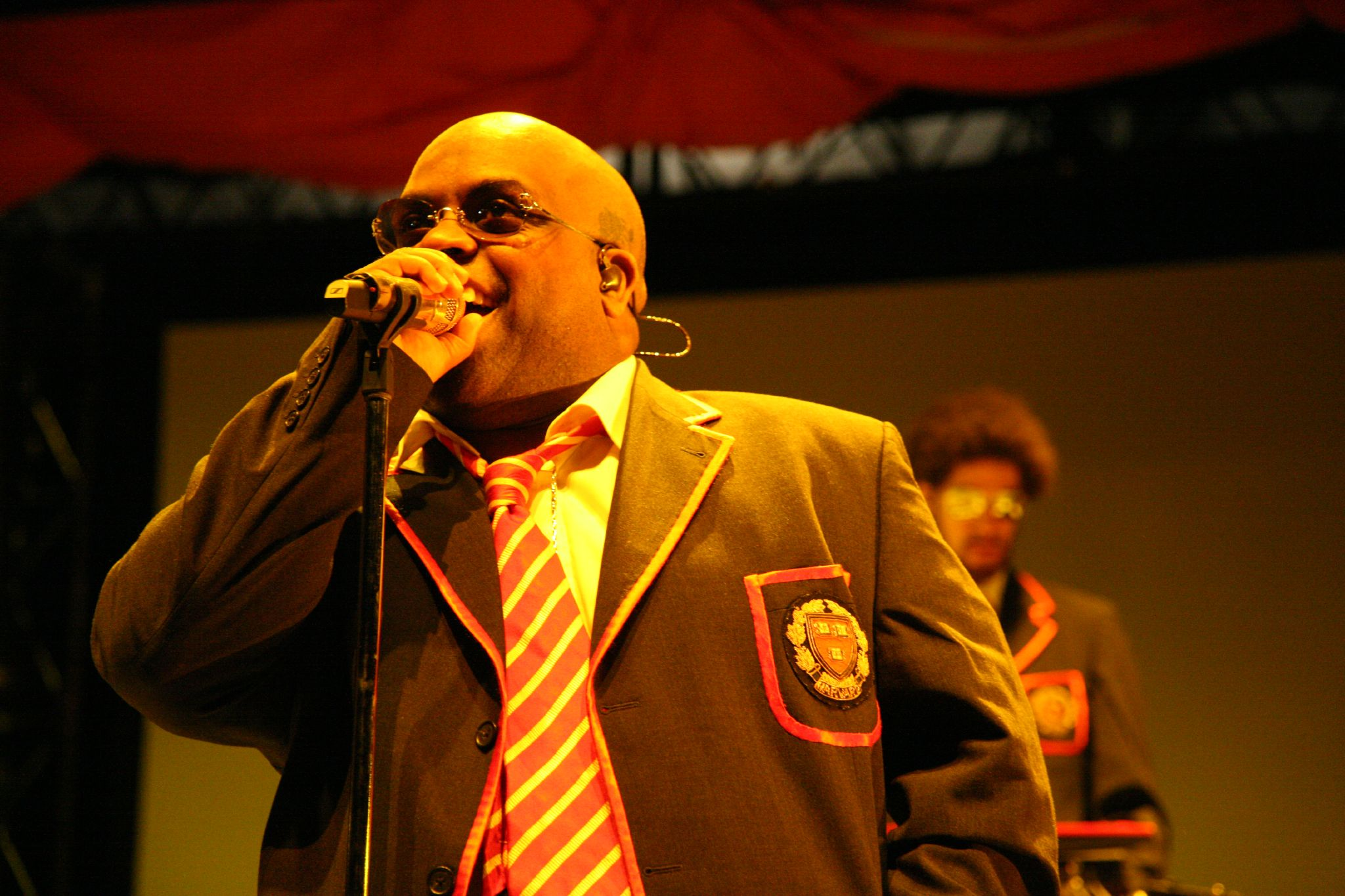
Awards and nominations
Award	Wins	Nominations
BET Awards	1	6
Billboard Music Award	1	2
Brit Awards	1	5
Grammy Award	5	18
NAACP Image Awards	1	8
Q Awards	1	3
NME Awards	0	1
Soul Train Music Awards	2	3
Teen Choice Awards	0	6
Slammy Award	1	1

Totals (Note: Certain award groups do not simply award one winner. They acknowledge several different recipients, have runners-up, and have third place. Since this is a specific recognition and is different from losing an award, runner-up mentions are considered wins in this award tally. For simplification and to avoid errors, each award in this list has been presumed to have had a prior nomination.)
- Wins: 13
- Nominations: 53

CeeLo Green (born 1975) is an American recording artist. He has received a multitude of awards and accolades in recognition of his success in the music industry. This includes five Grammy Awards, one BET Award, one Billboard Music Award, and one Brit Award.

== BET Awards ==
Year	Nominee / work	Award	Result
2007	"Crazy"	Video of the Year	Nominated
2007	Gnarls Barkley	Best New Artist	Nominated
2007	Gnarls Barkley	Best Group	Won
2008	Gnarls Barkley	Best Group	Nominated
2011	CeeLo Green	Best Male R&B Artist	Nominated
2011	CeeLo Green	Centric Award	Nominated

== Billboard Music Awards ==
Year	Nominee / work	Award	Result
2006	"Crazy"	Digital Song of the Year	Nominated
2011	CeeLo Green	Viral Innovator of the Year	Won
2012	CeeLo Green	R&B Artist of the Year	Nominated
2012	"Fuck You"	R&B Song of the Year	Nominated

== Brit Awards ==
Year	Nominee / work	Award	Result
2007	St. Elsewhere	International Album	Nominated
2007	Gnarls Barkley	International Breakthrough Act	Nominated
2007	Gnarls Barkley	International Group	Nominated
2011	The Lady Killer	International Album	Nominated
2011	CeeLo Green	International Male Solo Artist	Won

== Grammy Awards ==
Year	Nominee / work	Award	Result
2003	"Gettin' Grown"	Best Urban/Alternative Performance	Nominated
2007	"Crazy"	Record of the Year	Nominated
2007	"Crazy"	Best Urban/Alternative Performance	Won
2007	St. Elsewhere	Album of the Year	Nominated
2007	St. Elsewhere	Best Alternative Music Album	Won
2008	"Gone Daddy Gone"	Best Music Video	Nominated
2009	"Going On"	Best Pop Performance by a Duo or Group with Vocals	Nominated
2009	"Who's Gonna Save My Soul"	Best Music Video	Nominated
2009	The Odd Couple	Best Alternative Music Album	Nominated
2011	"Fuck You"	Record of the Year	Nominated
2011	"Fuck You"	Song of the Year	Nominated
2011	"Fuck You"	Best Urban/Alternative Performance	Won
2011	"Fuck You"	Best Music Video	Nominated
2012	"Fool for You" (featuring Melanie Fiona)	Best Traditional R&B Performance	Won
2012	"Fool for You" (featuring Melanie Fiona)	Best R&B Song	Won
2012	The Lady Killer	Best Pop Vocal Album	Nominated
2012	Doo-Wops & Hooligans (as featured artist)	Album of the Year	Nominated
2014	Cee Lo's Magic Moment	Best Traditional Pop Vocal Album	Nominated

== MOBO Awards ==
Year	Nominee / work	Award	Result
2015	CeeLo Green	Outstanding Achievement Award	Won

== MTV Europe Music Awards ==
Year	Nominee / work	Award	Result
2006	Gnarls Barkley	Best New Act	Won
2006	"Crazy"	Best Song	Won
2006	"Crazy"	Best Video	Nominated

== MTV Video Music Awards ==
Year	Nominee / work	Award	Result
2006	"Crazy"	Best Group Video	Nominated
2006	"Crazy"	Best Direction	Won
2006	"Crazy"	Best Editing	Won
2007	"Smiley Face"	Best Editing	Won
2008	"Run (I'm a Natural Disaster)"	Best Choreography	Won
2008	"Run (I'm a Natural Disaster)"	Best Art Direction	Won
2009	"Who's Gonna Save My Soul"	Breakthrough Video	Nominated
2009	"Who's Gonna Save My Soul"	Best Visual Effects	Nominated
2009	"Who's Gonna Save My Soul"	Best Art Direction	Nominated
2011	"F ck You"	Best Male Video	Nominated

== MTVU Woodie Awards ==
Year	Nominee / work	Award	Result
2006	Gnarls Barkley	Left Field Woodie	Won
2006	"Crazy"	Best Video Woodie – Animated	Nominated
2008	"Who's Gonna Save My Soul"	Best Video Woodie	Nominated

== NAACP Image Awards ==
Year	Nominee / work	Award	Result
2007	Gnarls Barkley	Outstanding Duo or Group	Nominated
2007	"Crazy"	Outstanding Song	Nominated
2011	CeeLo Green	Outstanding Male Artist	Nominated
2011	"Fuck You"	Outstanding Song	Nominated
2012	CeeLo Green	Outstanding Male Artist	Won
2012	CeeLo Green & Melanie Fiona	Outstanding Duo or Group	Nominated
2012	"Fool for You" (featuring Melanie Fiona)	Outstanding Song	Nominated
2013	"This Christmas"	Outstanding Music Video	Nominated

== NME Awards ==
Year	Nominee / work	Award	Result
2011	"Fuck You"	Best Track	Nominated

== Q Awards ==
Year	Nominee / work	Award	Result
2006	"Crazy"	Best Track	Won
2006	"Smiley Face"	Best Video	Nominated
2011	CeeLo Green	Best Male Artist	Nominated

== Slammy Awards ==
Year	Nominee / work	Award	Result
2011	CeeLo Green & Beyonce	WWE A-lister of the Year	Won

== Soul Train Music Awards ==
Year	Nominee / work	Award	Result
2007	St. Elsewhere	Best R&B/Soul Album – Group, Band or Duo	Nominated
2007	"Crazy"	Best R&B/Soul Single – Group, Band or Duo	Won
2011	CeeLo Green	Best R&B/Soul Male Artist	Won

== Teen Choice Awards ==
Year	Nominee / work	Award	Result
2006	Gnarls Barkley	Choice Music: Male Breakout Artist	Nominated
2006	"Crazy"	Choice Music: Summer Song	Nominated
2011	CeeLo Green	Choice Music: Male Artist	Nominated
2011	"Fuck You"	Choice Music: Break-Up Song	Nominated
2012	CeeLo Green	Choice TV: Male Personality	Nominated
2012	CeeLo Green	Choice Fashion Icon: Male	Nominated

== Filmography ==
Year	Nominee / work	Award	Result
1998	Hotel Transylvania	Murray the Mummy	voice role
1999	Begin Again	Troublegum	voice
