= 2009 MTV Video Music Awards =

American award ceremony

- Date: September 13, 2009
- Location: Radio City Music Hall (New York City)
- Country: United States
- Hosted by: Russell Brand
- Most awards: Beyoncé, Green Day and Lady Gaga (3)
- Most nominations: Beyoncé and Lady Gaga (9)
- Website: http://www.mtv.com/ontv/vma/2009/

Television/radio coverage
- Network: MTV and VH1
- Produced by: Jesse Ignjatovic; Dave Sirulnick
- Directed by: Hamish Hamilton

The 2009 MTV Video Music Awards, honoring the best music videos from the previous year between June 2008 to June 2009, were presented on September 13, 2009, at the Radio City Music Hall in New York City, and televised by MTV. The ceremony was hosted by Russell Brand for the 2nd consecutive year.

Beyoncé, Green Day, and Lady Gaga were tied for the most-awarded acts of the night, winning three awards each. Beyoncé's "Single Ladies (Put a Ring on It)" won the award for Video of the Year, while Beyoncé and Lady Gaga were both tied for the largest number of nominations with nine, followed by Britney Spears with seven. In the aftermath of his June 2009 death, the show featured various tributes to Michael Jackson, including an opening act featuring a medley of Jackson's biggest hits and a special appearance by Janet Jackson to perform her duet "Scream", a eulogy from Madonna, and the premiere of a trailer for the posthumous documentary film Michael Jackson's This Is It.

The ceremony was marred by an incident in which Kanye West interrupted Taylor Swift's acceptance of the award for Best Female Video, in order to proclaim that despite her victory, Beyoncé still had "one of the best videos of all time", referring to the aforementioned "Single Ladies (Put a Ring on It)". When Beyoncé was eventually awarded Video of the Year, she acknowledged the moment when she had won her first VMA as part of Destiny's Child, and invited Swift back onstage to finish her acceptance speech. The incident was highly publicized, with Rolling Stone naming it the "wildest" moment in the history of the VMAs in 2013.

The broadcast was seen by a total of 9 million viewers, a 17% increase over 2008, making it the most-watched VMAs since 2004.

== Performances ==
| Performer(s) | Song(s) |
Main show
| This Is It Backup Dancers; Janet Jackson | Tribute to Michael Jackson "Thriller" "Bad" "Smooth Criminal" "Scream" (with Jackson) |
| Katy Perry; Joe Perry | "We Will Rock You" |
| Taylor Swift | "You Belong with Me" |
| Lady Gaga | "Poker Face" (intro) "Paparazzi" |
| Green Day | "East Jesus Nowhere" |
| Beyoncé | "Sweet Dreams" (intro) "Single Ladies (Put a Ring on It)" |
| Muse | "Uprising" (from the Walter Kerr Theatre) |
| Pink | "Sober" |
| Jay-Z; Alicia Keys | "Empire State of Mind" |

=== House band performances ===
Rapper Wale and go-go band UCB served as the house band for the show, performing right before, during, and right after commercial breaks. Throughout the show they also had various special guests and performed the following songs:

- Wale and UCB – "Breakdown"
- Wale and UCB – "Chillin"
- 3OH!3, Wale and UCB – "Don't Trust Me"
- Wale and UCB – "Viva la Vida"
- Pitbull, Wale and UCB – "I Know You Want Me (Calle Ocho)"
- Solange, Wale and UCB – "Use Somebody"
- The All-American Rejects, Wale and UCB – "Gives You Hell"
- Kid Cudi, Wale and UCB – "Remembering DJ AM"
- Wale and UCB – "Pretty Girls"

== Winners and nominees ==
Winners are in bold text.

| Video of the Year | Best Male Video |
|---|---|
| **Beyoncé – "Single Ladies (Put a Ring on It)"**; Eminem – "We Made You"; Lady Gaga – "Poker Face"; Britney Spears – "Womanizer"; Kanye West – "Love Lockdown" | **T.I. (featuring Rihanna) – "Live Your Life"**; Eminem – "We Made You"; Jay-Z – "D.O.A. (Death of Auto-Tune)"; Ne-Yo – "Miss Independent"; Kanye West – "Love Lockdown" |
| Best Female Video | Best New Artist |
| **Taylor Swift – "You Belong with Me"**; Beyoncé – "Single Ladies (Put a Ring on It)"; Kelly Clarkson – "My Life Would Suck Without You"; Lady Gaga – "Poker Face"; Katy Perry – "Hot n Cold"; Pink – "So What" | **Lady Gaga – "Poker Face"**; 3OH!3 – "Don't Trust Me"; Drake – "Best I Ever Had"; Kid Cudi – "Day 'n' Nite"; Asher Roth – "I Love College" |
| Best Pop Video | Best Rock Video |
| **Britney Spears – "Womanizer"**; Beyoncé – "Single Ladies (Put a Ring on It)"; Cobra Starship (featuring Leighton Meester) – "Good Girls Go Bad"; Lady Gaga – "Poker Face"; Wisin & Yandel – "Abusadora" | **Green Day – "21 Guns"**; Coldplay – "Viva la Vida"; Fall Out Boy – "I Don't Care"; Kings of Leon – "Use Somebody"; Paramore – "Decode" |
| Best Hip-Hop Video | Breakthrough Video |
| **Eminem – "We Made You"**; Flo Rida – "Right Round"; Jay-Z – "D.O.A. (Death of Auto-Tune)"; Asher Roth – "I Love College"; Kanye West – "Love Lockdown" | **Matt and Kim – "Lessons Learned"**; Anjulie – "Boom"; Bat for Lashes – "Daniel"; Chairlift – "Evident Utensil"; Cold War Kids – "I've Seen Enough"; Death Cab for Cutie – "Grapevine Fires"; Gnarls Barkley – "Who's Gonna Save My Soul"; Major Lazer – "Hold the Line"; Passion Pit – "The Reeling"; Yeah Yeah Yeahs – "Heads Will Roll" |
| Best Direction | Best Choreography |
| **Green Day – "21 Guns" (Director: Marc Webb)**; Beyoncé – "Single Ladies (Put a Ring on It)" (Director: Jake Nava); Cobra Starship (featuring Leighton Meester) – "Good Girls Go Bad" (Director: Kai Regan); Lady Gaga – "Paparazzi" (Director: Jonas Åkerlund); Britney Spears – "Circus" (Director: Francis Lawrence) | **Beyoncé – "Single Ladies (Put a Ring on It)" (Choreographers: Frank Gatson Jr. and JaQuel Knight)**; Ciara (featuring Justin Timberlake) – "Love Sex Magic" (Choreographers: Jamaica Craft and Marty Kudelka); Kristinia DeBarge – "Goodbye" (Choreographer: Jamaica Craft); A. R. Rahman and The Pussycat Dolls (featuring Nicole Scherzinger) – "Jai Ho! (You Are My Destiny)" (Choreographers: Robin Antin and Mikey Minden); Britney Spears – "Circus" (Choreographer: Andre Fuentes) |
| Best Special Effects | Best Art Direction |
| **Lady Gaga – "Paparazzi" (Special Effects: Chimney Pot)**; Beyoncé – "Single Ladies (Put a Ring on It)" (Special Effects: VFX Effects and Louis Mackall V); Eminem – "We Made You" (Special Effects: Ingenuity Engine); Gnarls Barkley – "Who's Gonna Save My Soul" (Special Effects: Gradient Effects and Image Metrics); Kanye West (featuring Mr Hudson) – "Paranoid" (Special Effects: Wizardflex and Ghost Town Media) | **Lady Gaga – "Paparazzi" (Art Director: Jason Hamilton)**; Beyoncé – "Single Ladies (Put a Ring on It)" (Art Director: Niamh Byrne); Coldplay – "Viva la Vida" (Art Director: Gregory de Maria); Gnarls Barkley – "Who's Gonna Save My Soul" (Art Director: Zach Matthews); Britney Spears – "Circus" (Art Directors: Laura Fox and Charles Varga) |
| Best Editing | Best Cinematography |
| **Beyoncé – "Single Ladies (Put a Ring on It)" (Editor: Jarrett Fijal)**; Coldplay – "Viva la Vida" (Editor: Hype Williams); Miley Cyrus – "7 Things" (Editor: Jarrett Fijal); Lady Gaga – "Paparazzi" (Editors: Danny Tull and Jonas Åkerlund); Britney Spears – "Circus" (Editor: Jarrett Fijal) | **Green Day – "21 Guns" (Director of Photography: Jonathan Sela)**; Beyoncé – "Single Ladies (Put a Ring on It)" (Director of Photography: Jim Fealy); Coldplay – "Viva la Vida" (Director of Photography: John Perez); Lady Gaga – "Paparazzi" (Director of Photography: Eric Broms); Britney Spears – "Circus" (Director of Photography: Thomas Kloss) |
| Best Video (That Should Have Won a Moonman) | Best Performance in a Pepsi Rock Band Video |
| **Beastie Boys – "Sabotage"**; Björk – "Human Behaviour"; Dr. Dre – "Nuthin' but a 'G' Thang"; Foo Fighters – "Everlong"; George Michael – "Freedom! '90"; OK Go – "Here It Goes Again"; Tom Petty and the Heartbreakers – "Into the Great Wide Open"; Radiohead – "Karma Police"; David Lee Roth – "California Girls"; U2 – "Where the Streets Have No Name" | **Nerds in Disguise – "My Own Worst Enemy"**; Blaq Star – "Shining Star"; One (Wo)Man Band – "Bad Reputation"; The Sleezy Treezy – "Here It Goes Again"; Synopsis – "The Kill |

=== Best Breakout Artist Awards ===
Eight local MTV VMA Best Breakout Artist Awards were awarded. The table below lists the number of bands considered in each city, the three finalist nominees selected by MTV for each VMA, and the winner in bold. The winners were featured on MTV on local cable during the live VMAs and received featured coverage on MTV and MTV2 (or MTV Tr3́s in the case of the LA contest).

| New York City | Bay Area | Atlanta | Chicago | Boston | Philadelphia | Washington, DC | Los Angeles |
|---|---|---|---|---|---|---|---|
| **MeTalkPretty**; Red Directors; The Shells; of over 190 entries Presented by Time Warner Cable and MTV2 | The New Up; Oona; **Picture Me Broken**; of 129 entries Presented by Comcast and MTV2 | **Holla Front**; Rantings of Eva; Tone G; of over 150 entries Presented by Comcast and MTV2 | **Andrew Belle**; The Lifeline; Stoop Goodnoise; of over 150 entries Presented by Comcast and MTV2 | Air Traffic Controller; **Gentlemen Hall**; Twin Berlin; of over 150 entries Presented by Comcast and MTV2 | Atlantic Avenue; **DaCav5**; Rushmore; of over 150 entries Presented by Comcast and MTV2 | 23RAINYDAYS; RAtheMC; **Frank Sirius**; of over 170 entries Presented by Comcast and MTV2 | **La Banda Skalavera**; No Way Jose; South Central Skankers; of 116 entries Presented by Time Warner Cable and MTV Tr3́s |

== Artists with multiple wins and nominations ==
Artists who received multiple awards
| Wins | Artist |
|---|---|
| 3 | Beyoncé |
| 3 | Green Day |
| 3 | Lady Gaga |

Artists who received multiple nominations
| Nominations | Artist |
|---|---|
| 9 | Beyoncé |
| 9 | Lady Gaga |
| 7 | Britney Spears |
| 4 | Coldplay |
| 4 | Eminem |
| 4 | Kanye West |
| 3 | Gnarls Barkley |
| 3 | Green Day |
| 2 | Asher Roth |
| 2 | Cobra Starship |
| 2 | Jay-Z |

== Music videos with multiple wins and nominations ==
Music videos that received multiple awards
| Wins | Artist | Music Video |
|---|---|---|
| 3 | Beyoncé | "Single Ladies (Put a Ring on It)" |
| 3 | Green Day | "21 Guns" |
| 2 | Lady Gaga | "Paparazzi" |

Music videos that received multiple nominations
| Nominations | Artist | Music Video |
|---|---|---|
| 9 | Beyoncé | "Single Ladies (Put a Ring on It)" |
| 5 | Britney Spears | "Circus" |
| 5 | Lady Gaga | "Paparazzi" |
| 4 | Lady Gaga | "Poker Face" |
| 4 | Coldplay | "Viva la Vida" |
| 4 | Eminem | "We Made You" |
| 3 | Gnarls Barkley | "Who's Gonna Save My Soul" |
| 3 | Green Day | "21 Guns" |
| 3 | Kanye West | "Love Lockdown" |
| 2 | Asher Roth | "I Love College" |
| 2 | Britney Spears | "Womanizer" |
| 2 | Cobra Starship (featuring Leighton Meester) | "Good Girls Go Bad" |
| 2 | Jay-Z | "D.O.A. (Death of Auto-Tune)" |

== Appearances ==
=== Pre-show ===
- Buzz Aldrin – presented Breakthrough Video
- Sway Calloway – presented Best Video (That Should Have Won a Moonman)

=== Main show ===
- Madonna – opened the show with a speech about Michael Jackson
- Shakira and Taylor Lautner – presented Best Female Video
- Jack Black and Leighton Meester – presented Best Rock Video
- Miranda Cosgrove and Justin Bieber – introduced Taylor Swift
- Pete Wentz and Gabe Saporta – introduced Lady Gaga
- Nelly Furtado and Kristin Cavallari – presented Best Pop Video
- Megan Fox and Adam Brody – introduced Green Day
- Robert Pattinson, Kristen Stewart and Taylor Lautner – introduced an exclusive New Moon sneak peek preview
- Chace Crawford and Ne-Yo – introduced Beyoncé
- Diddy and Jamie-Lynn Sigler – presented Best Male Video
- Gerard Butler and Alexa Chung – introduced Muse
- Jennifer Lopez – presented Best Hip-Hop Video
- Eminem and Tracy Morgan – presented Best New Artist
- Serena Williams – introduced Pink
- Jimmy Fallon and Andy Samberg – presented Video of the Year

== Kanye West–Taylor Swift incident ==
West taking the microphone from Swift at the 2009 MTV Video Music Awards

As Taylor Swift was giving her Best Female Video acceptance speech for "You Belong with Me", Kanye West went on stage, took the microphone from her, and said: "Yo, Taylor, I'm really happy for you, I'mma let you finish, but Beyoncé had one of the best videos of all time! One of the best videos of all time!", referring to the music video for "Single Ladies (Put a Ring on It)". As the live audience booed, West shrugged his shoulders, handed the microphone back to Swift, and walked off stage as he raised his middle fingers toward the audience.

West was subsequently removed from the show. Later in the show, Beyoncé won Video of the Year for "Single Ladies" and called Swift back onstage to let her finish her speech.

Various celebrities and industry figures, as well as prominent political figures including then United States President Barack Obama, former President Jimmy Carter, and future President Donald Trump condemned West for his verbal outburst at Swift. West apologized on his blog and during an appearance on The Jay Leno Show.

Emil Wilbekin, managing editor of Essence magazine, argued that West went too far with his actions, compared to the past: "I think that it was not Kanye's place to speak for Beyoncé or to ruin Taylor Swift's moment... It's OK for Kanye to rattle off about himself, but I think he crossed the line when he decided to speak for other people." Los Angeles Times contributor Ann Powers opined that "from one vantage point, it was a case of chivalry gone horribly wrong" as West meant to "stand up for" Beyoncé. Powers was cynical about the onstage embrace Beyoncé and Swift shared, calling it "staged" and stating that it added "another layer of meaning to an already complicated moment. Now this controversy was about women sticking up for each other, too."

In 2013, Rolling Stone named the incident the wildest moment in VMA history. The outburst resulted in a meme consisting of images of West being superimposed onto other images with text in the style of his interruption as a snowclone ("X is one of the greatest Y of all time", or variants thereon, in some cases preceded by "I'm really happy for you" and/or "I'mma let you finish")." West later referenced the incident in his 2016 single "Famous", controversially claiming that he made Swift famous through it.

== See also ==
- 2009 MTV Europe Music Awards
