= Clayton James Cubitt =

American photographer

Clayton Cubitt
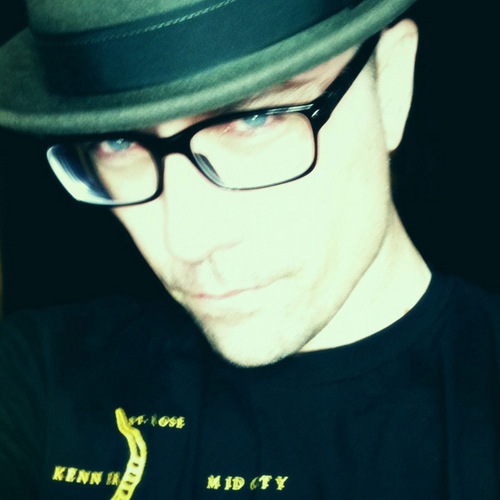
- Born: Clayton James Cubitt; March 2, 1972 (age 54); New Orleans, Louisiana, U.S.
- Known for: Photography

Clayton James Cubitt (born March 2, 1972), also known as Siege, is an American photographer, filmmaker and writer living in Brooklyn. He is known for applying an "arrestingly controlled and sleek sense of style" to art, portrait, erotic and fashion photography. He has been described as "one of a new breed of photographers no longer content to draw a distinction between the worlds of fashion, art, and porn."

== Early life ==
Cubitt grew up in New Orleans and other parts of the Gulf Coast. He was inspired to explore photography after seeing the photograph "Susie Smoking," shot by Nick Knight for a Yohji Yamamoto ad campaign. Cubitt also cites Helmut Newton's photograph "Green Room Murder" as an early inspiration. He moved north after high school, eventually settling in Brooklyn in early 2000.

== Career ==
=== Blogging for Nerve.com ===
From 2004 to 2008, Cubitt published a photography/confessional blog titled "The Daily Siege" at sex/culture online magazine Nerve. It was described by Eyemazing Journal as "one of the best sources of intelligent, open sexuality on the web.” In addition to erotic content, including images and podcasts, the blog featured Cubitt's writing on a variety of topics, including politics and his creative process.

=== Fashion photography ===
In 2005, Cubitt collaborated on a generative art fashion series with creative coder Tom Carden. To create the images, Cubitt used software that experimented with particles and attractors. The software was written by Carden using the alpha version of the Processing Programming Language, and the images were published in Metropop Magazine. Cubitt is also known for "Lagos Calling", an alternate-reality fashion story that reimagined the skinhead fashion movement as a product of late-1960s Lagos, Nigeria, rather than London. The images were presented as a set of resurfaced, damaged, faded anthropological portraits. The series was used as stylistic inspiration for the Gnarls Barkley music video for "Going On". Websites have mistakenly published the images as historical reference. Cubitt created a series called "Damaged Doll" that featured pornographic actress Justine Joli in a sexual, high-fashion context. Two of the images were included in The Playground, a collectible boxed set of fashion artwork. Two different printers refused to print the pieces due to their explicit nature, so the book publishers printed them manually. However, Barney's New York refused to stock the boxed set due to the inclusion of the two pieces.

=== Hurricane Katrina survivor portraits ===
In 2005, Cubitt traveled to Pearlington, Mississippi, ground zero for Hurricane Katrina, after hearing that his mother's home there had been destroyed. Upon arriving, Cubitt began to document the area's devastation. He set up a photography studio in order to interview and photograph Katrina's survivors and volunteers in Pearlington's former school gymnasium, which was serving as a distribution point for aid in the town. Cubitt published their stories and images on a blog he created, titled "Operation Eden." For a time, the blog became a central hub for volunteers and people seeking to send relief, and citizens who were curious about what the mainstream media wasn't covering. The blog has been described as "a powerful piece of citizen journalism." It was featured on MSNBC, LIFE Magazine, and Rolling Stone. Cubitt returned to the area subsequently to photograph survivors in Mississippi and New Orleans. His Katrina portraits were used by ad agency Grey Worldwide, in conjunction with SAMHSA and the Ad Council, to create a series of PSAs urging Katrina survivors to reach out for help.

=== Celebrity portraiture ===
Cubitt's celebrity portrait subjects include David Byrne , Peter Murphy, Xeni Jardin, Levon Helm, Shaun Ross, Big Freedia, Justine Joli, and Molly Crabapple. Cubitt is credited for initially discovering underground South African rap-rave group Die Antwoord, and subsequently shot their portrait and album cover for the band's debut$, O$.

=== Video art ===
In 2008–2009, Cubitt created a video series of Long Portraits, in which subjects were filmed sitting still for five minutes or more. The Long Portrait format became popular on Vimeo, inspiring many other photographers to create their own versions.

In 2012, Cubitt created a video series entitled Hysterical Literature. Shot clinically in black and white, each film shows a fully dressed woman reading a passage from a book of her choice while supposedly being brought to orgasm by an unseen assistant. The first installment in the video series featured adult performer Stoya reading Necrophilia Variations by Supervert, and has received over thirty-one million views on YouTube as of August 2025. Subsequent videos feature "friends and industry comrades" like Margaret Cho, Toni Bentley and others reading passages from books including Bret Easton Ellis' American Psycho and Walt Whitman's Leaves of Grass.

=== Veterans for Bernie Sanders ===
In 2016, Cubitt became a vocal supporter of senator Bernie Sanders' presidential campaign. Cubitt photographed war veterans and interviewed them about what Sanders' candidacy means to them. The images were used by the official Bernie Sanders campaign.

== Exhibitions ==
Group Shows

- 2003 SENT: America's First Phonecam Art Show, Los Angeles, CA
- 2008 Anonymous, New York, NY
- 2008 (Untitled) u = ____, New York, NY
- 2009 Talk Dirty to Me, New York, NY
- 2011 Fashioning Photography, Essex Junction, VT
- 2012 LEWD, New York, NY
