= List of Billboard number-one electronic albums of 2006 =

These are the albums that reached number one on the Billboard Dance/Electronic Albums chart in 2006.

== Chart history ==
Key
†	Indicates best-performing album of 2006

Issue date	Album	Artist	Reference
January 7	Confessions on a Dance Floor †	Madonna	
January 14	Confessions on a Dance Floor †	Madonna	
January 21	Confessions on a Dance Floor †	Madonna	
January 28	Confessions on a Dance Floor †	Madonna	
February 4	Confessions on a Dance Floor †	Madonna	
February 11	Confessions on a Dance Floor †	Madonna	
February 18	Demon Days	Gorillaz	
February 25	Demon Days	Gorillaz	
March 4	Demon Days	Gorillaz	
March 11	Demon Days	Gorillaz	
March 18	Confessions on a Dance Floor †	Madonna	
March 25	Confessions on a Dance Floor †	Madonna	
April 1	Demon Days	Gorillaz	
April 8	Demon Days	Gorillaz	
April 15	Demon Days	Gorillaz	
April 22	Demon Days	Gorillaz	
April 29	Demon Days	Gorillaz	
May 6	Demon Days	Gorillaz	
May 13	The Hardest Way to Make an Easy Living	The Streets	
May 20	Demon Days	Gorillaz	
May 27	St. Elsewhere	Gnarls Barkley	
June 3	St. Elsewhere	Gnarls Barkley	
June 10	St. Elsewhere	Gnarls Barkley	
June 17	St. Elsewhere	Gnarls Barkley	
June 24	St. Elsewhere	Gnarls Barkley	
July 1	St. Elsewhere	Gnarls Barkley	
July 8	St. Elsewhere	Gnarls Barkley	
July 15	St. Elsewhere	Gnarls Barkley	
July 22	St. Elsewhere	Gnarls Barkley	
July 29	St. Elsewhere	Gnarls Barkley	
August 5	St. Elsewhere	Gnarls Barkley	
August 12	St. Elsewhere	Gnarls Barkley	
August 19	St. Elsewhere	Gnarls Barkley	
August 26	St. Elsewhere	Gnarls Barkley	
September 2	St. Elsewhere	Gnarls Barkley	
September 9	St. Elsewhere	Gnarls Barkley	
September 16	St. Elsewhere	Gnarls Barkley	
September 23	St. Elsewhere	Gnarls Barkley	
September 30	St. Elsewhere	Gnarls Barkley	
October 7	St. Elsewhere	Gnarls Barkley	
October 14	Ta-Dah	Scissor Sisters	
October 21	St. Elsewhere	Gnarls Barkley	
October 28	St. Elsewhere	Gnarls Barkley	
November 4	St. Elsewhere	Gnarls Barkley	
November 11	St. Elsewhere	Gnarls Barkley	
November 18	St. Elsewhere	Gnarls Barkley	
November 25	St. Elsewhere	Gnarls Barkley	
December 2	St. Elsewhere	Gnarls Barkley	
December 9	St. Elsewhere	Gnarls Barkley	
December 16	St. Elsewhere	Gnarls Barkley	
December 23	St. Elsewhere	Gnarls Barkley	
December 30	St. Elsewhere	Gnarls Barkley	
