= Run (I'm a Natural Disaster) =

Single by Gnarls Barkley

from the album The Odd Couple
- Released: February 5, 2008
- Genre: R&B
- Length: 2:44
- Label: Warner Music
- Songwriters: Danger Mouse; Cee-Lo Green
- Producer: Danger Mouse

Gnarls Barkley singles chronology
"Who Cares?" / "Gone Daddy Gone" (2006)	"Run" (2008)	"Going On" (2008)

Audio sample
- file; help

Music video
- "Run (I'm a Natural Disaster)" on YouTube

"Run (I'm a Natural Disaster)", also known more commonly as "Run", is a song written and recorded by Gnarls Barkley. It is the first single to be released from the band's second album The Odd Couple. Released in February 2008 as a digital download in the UK and the US via the iTunes Store, a physical release of the single followed in the UK on March 31. The song features a sample from Keith Mansfield's "Junior Jet Set" from the KPM LP Flamboyant Themes and "Starting Out the Day" by Strawberry Alarm Clock.

The song is featured in the film X-Men: First Class, as a playable song in the video game Dance Central 2, and is heard in promos for Disney-Pixar's Cars 2 and the eight series of CBBC's Raven.

"Run" was number 34 on Rolling Stone's list of the 100 Best Songs of 2008.

== Commercial performance ==
"Run" entered the UK Singles Chart at number 63 based on first-week sales of the digital single but the following week, it fell to number 86 and then again to number 95 but the following week it jumped back up to number 69 and then jumped to a new peak of number 51 a week later. It officially debuted on the UK Top 40 at number 32 on downloads alone and stayed there the following week with physical sales added.

== Music video ==
The video premiered on MTV Overdrive on February 29, 2008. The video features Cee-Lo and Danger Mouse performing on a TV show called "City Vibin'", reminiscent of Graffiti Rock. Cee-Lo Green sings the song behind a microphone stand, while Danger Mouse plays the song's music on a turntable. Justin Timberlake appears in a cameo as the host of the show. The video features dizzying special effects such as hypnotic spirals, and as a result was banned from airplay in the United States after failing the Harding test (a test designed to protect sufferers of photosensitive epilepsy). The hypnotic spirals were later toned down upon request and the video premiered on TRL March 6, 2008. The video won for Best Choreography as well as Best Art Direction in a Video at the 2008 MTV Video Music Awards.

The music video was directed by Happy.

== Track listing ==
German CD single

1. "Run" (album version) – 2:40
2. "Who's Gonna Save My Soul" (instrumental) – 3:14

UK 7" vinyl picture disc

1. "Run" (album version) – 2:40
2. "Run" (instrumental) – 2:50
3. "Who's Gonna Save My Soul" (instrumental) – 3:14

== Charts ==
Chart (2008)	Peak position
German Singles Chart	72
Japan (Japan Hot 100)	48
UK Singles Chart	32
US Billboard Bubbling Under Hot 100 Singles	14
US Billboard Hot Modern Rock Tracks	35
US Billboard Pop 100	64
