= Sound Advice (disambiguation) =

Sound Advice was a 1994–2008 Canadian radio show.

"Sound Advice" may also refer to:

- Sound Advice, a Florida-based consumer electronics chain bought by Tweeter in 2001
- Sound Advice, a music group that produced the 2006 album Gnarls Biggie
- Sound Advice, a 2003 album by Daddy Kev
- Sound Advice, a 2006 album by The Shapeshifters
- Sound Advice, a 2011 album by Patti Austin
- "Sound Advice", a 1962 song by Elvis Presley from the film Follow That Dream
- "Sound Advice", a 2002 single by British DJ Roni Size
- "Sound Advice", a 2007 single by Finnish rock group Private Line from the album Evel Knievel Factor
- Sound Advice, a British radio show that aired on BBC Radio 5 in the early 1990s
- Sound Advice, a comedy web series starring Vanessa Bayer
- iTHINK Financial Amphitheatre, a Florida music venue named the "Sound Advice Amphitheatre" from 2003 to 2008
