= Here Where We Live Is Our Country =

2026 non-fiction book by Molly Crabapple

- Author: Molly Crabapple
- Genre: non-fiction
- Published: 2026 (One World/Random House)
- Publication date: April 7, 2026
- ISBN: 9780593229453

Here Where We Live Is Our Country: The Story of the Jewish Bund is a 2026 book by the American artist Molly Crabapple in which she narrates the history of The General Jewish Labour Bund, an anti-Zionist socialist party of the Eastern European Jewish working class founded by revolutionaries in Vilna in the Russian Empire in 1897. Crabapple describes the story of The Bund in her introduction as "a story of our own times, a blueprint for survival, a cautionary tale of death, and a philosophy that might yet save us."

== Background ==
Previous work on the subject from Crabapple includes her October 2018 piece "My Great-Grandfather the Bundist" published in the The New York Review of Books, her December 2018 piece "The War on Memory: Learning from the Jewish Labor Bund" in The Funambulist, and remarks delivered at the Symposium on the Jewish Left 2025.

Crabapple's narrative of the Bund contains references to her great-grandfather, the artist and Bundist Samuel Rothbort.

== Reviews ==
- Brody, Samuel Hayim (August 17, 2026). "Back to the Bund". Jewish Currents.
- Flakin, Nathaniel (August 14, 2026). "Bundism, Zionism, and Bolshevism: Review of Molly Crabapple's New Book". Left Voice.
- Green, Dominic (July 14, 2026). "'Here Where We Live Is Our Country' Review: Defiance in the Diaspora". Wall Street Journal. ISSN 0099-9660.
- Hochschild, Adam (May 28, 2026). "A Dream of a Socialist Commonwealth". The New York Review of Books. Vol. 73, no. 9. ISSN 0028-7504.
- Hodes, Ivan (July 20, 2026). "Here Where We Live Is a Home for Everyone". Liberal Currents.
- Krutikov, Mikhail (May 17, 2026). "Molly Crabapple's book is well researched but ideologically biased". The Forward.
- Marcus, Anthony (November 9, 2026). "Still seasick? The Jewish left, the Bund, and the Fiddler on the Roof problem" Dialectical Anthropology
- Strasser, Max (April 6, 2026). "What Does Judaism Look Like Without Zionism?". The New York Times. ISSN 0362-4331.
