= Smiley Faces =

2006 single by Gnarls Barkley

Single by Gnarls Barkley

from the album St. Elsewhere
- B-side: "Go-Go Gadget Gospel"
- Released: July 17, 2006
- Length: 3:05
- Label: Warner Music, Lex
- Songwriters: Brian Burton, Thomas Callaway
- Producer: Danger Mouse

Gnarls Barkley singles chronology
| "Crazy" (2006) | "Smiley Faces" (2006) | "Who Cares? / Gone Daddy Gone" (2006) |

Audio sample
- file; help

Alternative cover
- UK CD2 cover

Music video
- "Smiley Faces" on YouTube

"Smiley Faces" is a song by American soul music duo Gnarls Barkley from their debut studio album, St. Elsewhere (2006). It was released July 17, 2006, as the second single from that album in the United Kingdom and peaked at number 10 on the UK Singles Chart.

== Critical reception ==
"Smiley Faces" received positive reception from music critics. NME called the song the duo's "next inevitable Number One" after the single "Crazy", saying that they've "created more blazing Motown for the modern man, where searing, quasi-religious soul vocals flutter over dirty bass and pumped-up nods to spaceship electro." In a review of St. Elsewhere, Grant "Gumshoe" Purdum of Tiny Mix Tapes noted the song as an example of Danger Mouse's "production savvy" on the album, pointing out its "mid-song dolphin calls and opulent organ lines".

== Music videos ==
Like the single "Crazy", there are two different music videos for this song.

The mockumentary-style music video for "Smiley Faces", directed by Robert Hales shows a music historian (played by Dennis Hopper) and an A&R executive (played by Dean Stockwell) being interviewed about whether or not Gnarls Barkley (the person) exists and pondering over whether Barkley is behind the music scene. The video shows musical acts and cultural events from the 1920s to the 1990s, with Cee-Lo and producer Danger Mouse in the background. The effect is similar to that of Woody Allen editing himself into archival film footage in Zelig. (Danger Mouse has spoken of Woody Allen's films, and Allen's auteur approach as having an influence on his music.) In September 2007, the video won an MTV Video Music Award for Best Editing.

There was another music video made directed by Marc Klasfeld and animated by Edgar Reyes, featuring an instant messaging smiley with a gangster smileys' wife (who takes her top off for him), going to a sex dungeon, killing the gangster with a chainsaw, getting arrested and sent to prison, getting broken out of prison by the gangsters' wife, being at a Gnarls Barkley concert (who were also both in smiley form), drinking a lot and being sick, going home with the gangsters wife and then her getting three of her topless friends, with the main smiley being very happy. This video was originally put on British music channels before the mockumentary video but was banned due to sexual content and violence.

== Commercial performance ==
"Smiley Faces" entered the UK Official Download Chart on May 3, 2006, at number 152. It reached its peak at number 12 on July 9, 2006. It then entered the UK Singles Chart on July 16, 2006, at number 23 based on download sales alone, climbing to number 10 after the physical release was available.

== Track listings ==
UK CD1

1. "Smiley Faces"
2. "Smiley Faces" (live on Later with Jools Holland)

UK CD2

1. "Smiley Faces" (radio edit)
2. "Go-Go Gadget Gospel"
3. "Crazy" (video)
4. "Exclusive Microsite"

UK 12-inch vinyl

1. "Smiley Faces"
2. "Go-Go Gadget Gospel"
3. "Smiley Faces" (instrumental)

== Personnel ==
Credits adapted from Tidal.

- Danger Mouse – producer, writer, mixing engineer
- CeeLo Green – vocals, writer
- Menta Malone – backing vocals
- Tomika Walden – backing vocals
- Dr. President – bass guitar, electric guitar, organ
- Ben H. Allen – recording engineer, mixing engineer
- Kennie Takahashi – mixing engineer

== Charts ==
=== Weekly charts ===
| Chart (2006–2007) | Peak position |
|---|---|
| Australia (ARIA) | 38 |
| Austria (Ö3 Austria Top 40) | 37 |
| Belgium (Ultratop 50 Flanders) | 33 |
| Belgium (Ultratop 50 Wallonia) | 39 |
| Germany (GfK) | 32 |
| Hungary (Editors' Choice Top 40) | 18 |
| Ireland (IRMA) | 9 |
| Netherlands (Dutch Top 40 Tipparade) | 3 |
| Netherlands (Single Top 100) | 47 |
| Scottish Singles Sales (Official Charts) | 12 |
| Slovakia Airplay (ČNS IFPI) | 81 |
| Sweden (Sverigetopplistan) | 57 |
| Switzerland (Schweizer Hitparade) | 37 |
| UK Singles (Official Charts) | 10 |
| UK Hip Hop/R&B (Official Charts) | 3 |

=== Year-end charts ===
| Chart (2006) | Position |
|---|---|
| UK Singles (OCC) | 98 |

== Release history ==
| Region | Date | Format(s) | Label(s) | Ref. |
|---|---|---|---|---|
| United Kingdom | July 17, 2006 | CD | Warner Bros.; Lex | |
| Australia | August 28, 2006 | CD | Warner Music | |
