= Molly Crabapple =

American writer and artist

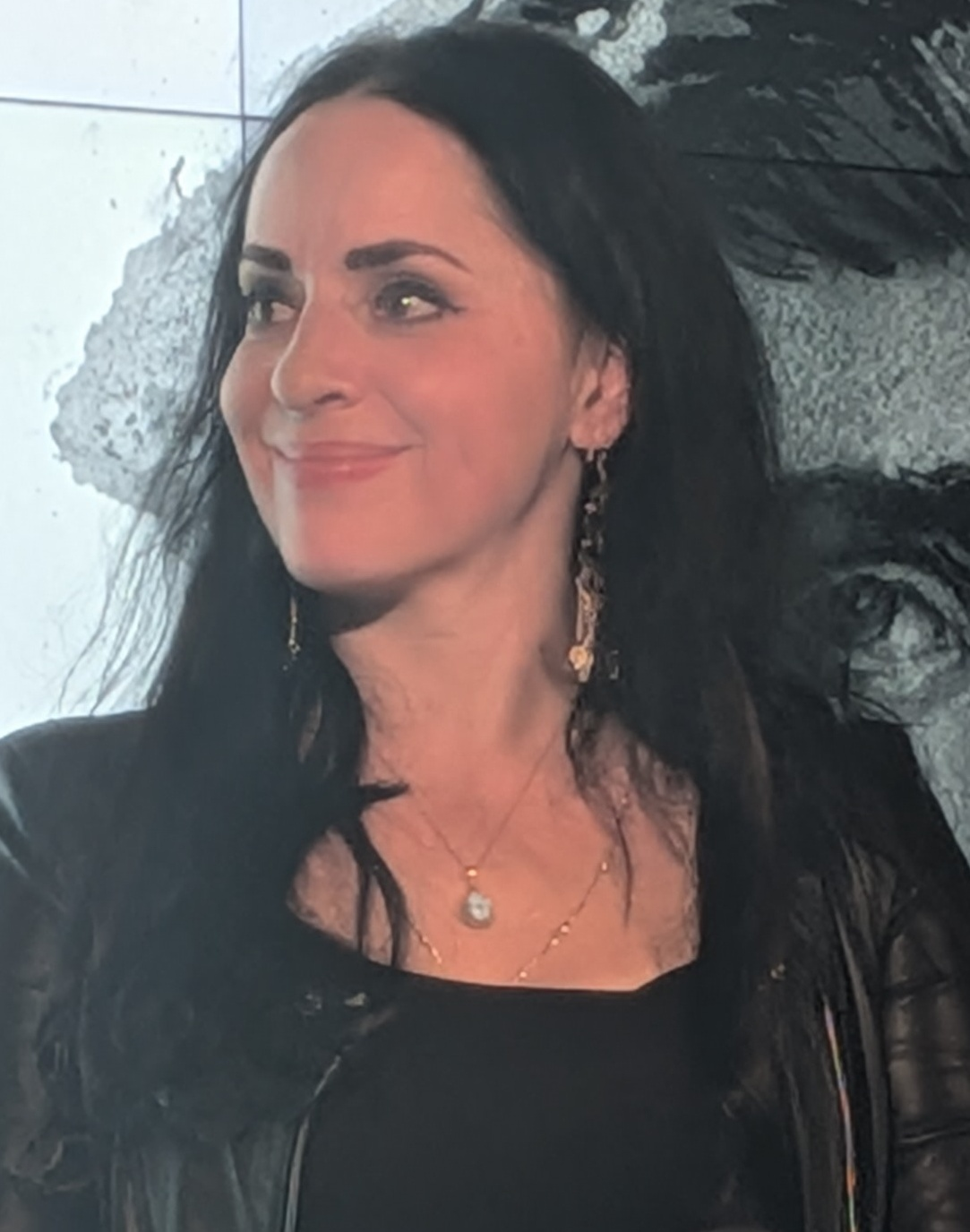
- Crabapple in 2026
- Born: Jennifer Caban; 1983 (age 42–43); Queens, New York, U.S.
- Known for: Fine art, illustration, writing
- Notable work: Shell Game (2013), Week in Hell (2012), Drawing Blood (2015), Brothers of the Gun (2018), Here Where We Live Is Our Country: The Story of the Jewish Bund (2026)
- Movement: Surrealism, steampunk
- Website: mollycrabapple.com

Molly Crabapple (born Jennifer Caban; 1983) is an American visual artist and writer.

She is a contributing editor for Vice and has written for a variety of other outlets, as well as publishing books, including the illustrated memoir Drawing Blood (2015), Discordia (with Laurie Penny) on the Greek economic crisis, the art books Devil in the Details and Week in Hell (2012), and a history of the Jewish Labor Bund called Here Where We Live Is Our Country (2026), which is a New York Times best seller.

Crabapple's works are held in the permanent collections of the Museum of Modern Art, the Barjeel Art Foundation, and the New-York Historical Society.

== Early life ==
Molly Crabapple was born Jennifer Caban in 1983 in Queens, New York City, New York, to a Puerto Rican father and a Jewish mother, who was the daughter of a Belarusian immigrant. Crabapple began drawing at the age of four with guidance from her mother, an illustrator who worked on toy product packaging.

Crabapple's school diagnosed her with oppositional defiant disorder (ODD), and she was expelled from the seventh grade. She never liked her given name, so she started using the name Molly Crabapple after a boyfriend suggested that it reflected her disposition.

After graduating from high school at age 17, Crabapple traveled to Europe. In Paris, she was welcomed by George Whitman, the proprietor of the English-language bookstore Shakespeare and Company. After receiving a notebook as a gift, she began drawing on a serious basis.

== Career ==
Crabapple went on to work as a life model and a burlesque performer, and modeled for the Society of Illustrators. At age 19, she was modeling for SuicideGirls and responding to Craigslist ads for nude photographic modeling. Crabapple earned more money modeling than at a typical day job and continued working on her illustrations. She briefly attended the Fashion Institute of Technology, withdrawing before completing her first year. For four years she worked as the house artist for the Box, a New York City nightclub.

=== Dr Sketchy's Anti-Art School ===
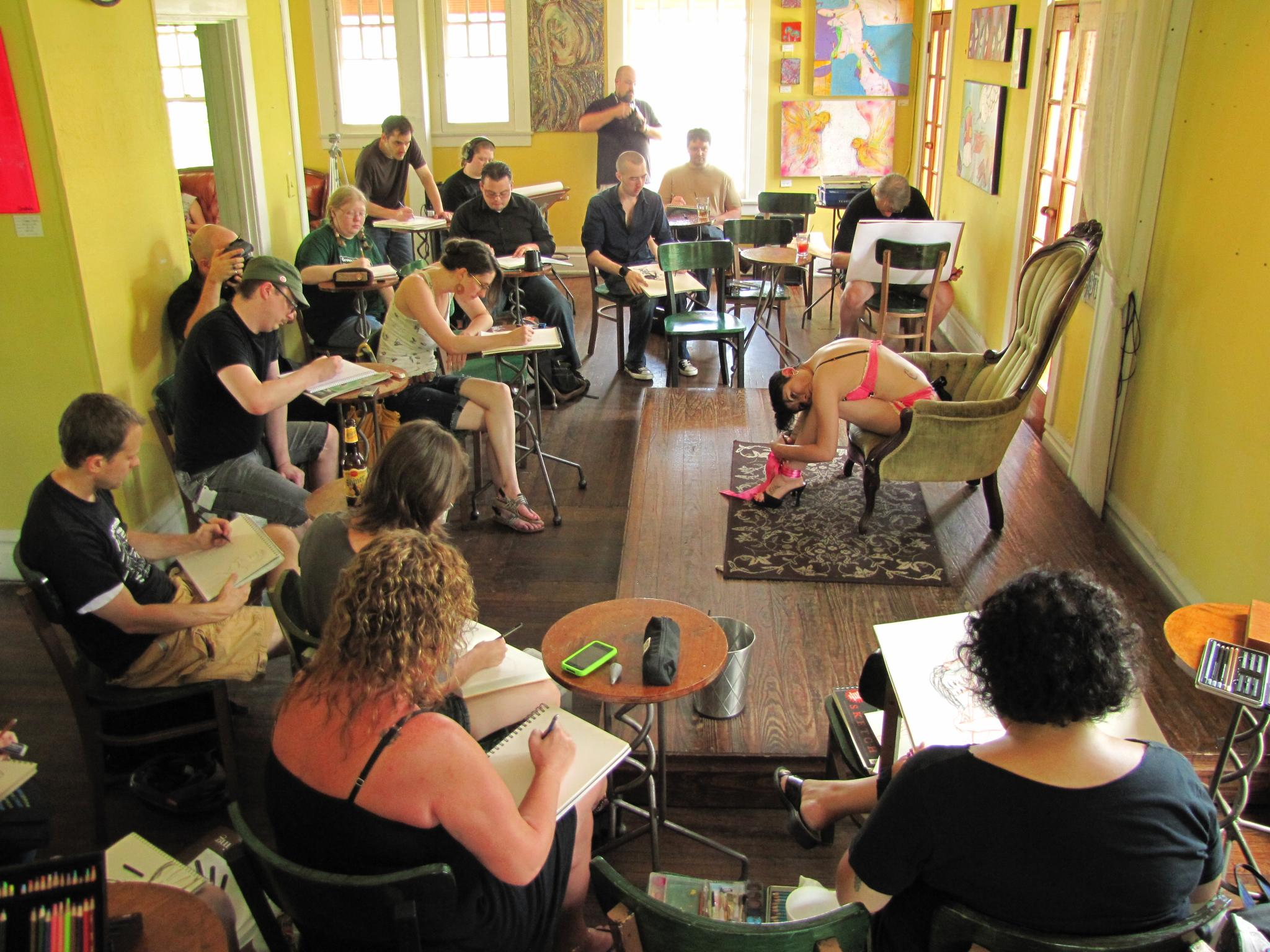
Dr Sketchy's at Avant Garden bar in Houston, Texas, 2010

After working as an artist's model, Crabapple became disenchanted with the structure of a formal sketch class. In 2005, she and illustrator A. V. Phibes founded Dr Sketchy's Anti-Art School, a burlesque life-drawing class. At a typical session, artists may drink alcohol while sketching burlesque models and play art games in venues ranging from bars to art museums. After an artist inquired about starting a Dr Sketchy's in Melbourne, Australia, it began to spread around the world. As of 2010, there are approximately 150 licensees using the Dr Sketchy's name.

=== Comics ===
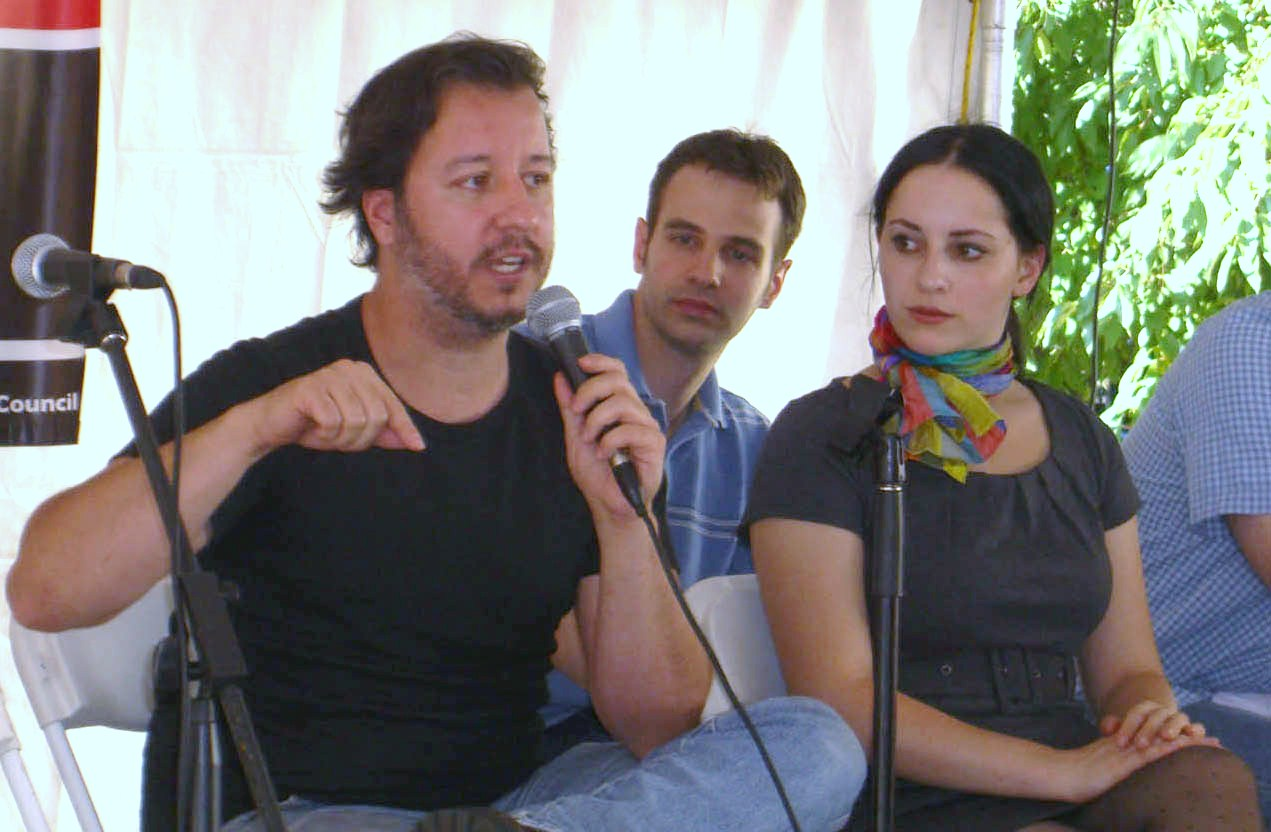
Crabapple (right) at the ACT-I-VATE panel at the 2009 Brooklyn Book Festival

Crabapple has contributed her illustrations to a number of comics, often with writer John Leavitt. They worked on Backstage (2008), a webcomic at Act-i-vate that tells the story of how fire eater Scarlett O'Herring was murdered. Scarlett Takes Manhattan (2009), a graphic novel published by Fugu Press, is a prequel to Backstage. Puppet Makers (2011), a steampunk webcomic that depicts an alternate history of the Industrial Revolution and the court of Versailles, was released for digital download by DC Comics. Crabapple also illustrated two Marvel anthologies, Strange Tales volume 2 and Girl Comics volume 2.

=== Occupy Wall Street ===
In September 2011, Crabapple was living in a studio near Zuccotti Park. Occupy Wall Street protesters had begun to use the park as a camp for their movement, artists began creating posters, and Crabapple contributed work and engaged in the movement. "Before Occupy I felt like using my art for activist causes was exploitive of activist causes," she told The Village Voice. "Occupy [...] allowed me to engage my art in politics."

Artists and journalists who had come from all over the world to report on the protests used Crabapple's apartment as an "impromptu salon" for the Occupy movement. In Discordia (2012), British journalist Laurie Penny recounts how Crabapple "perched at her desk churning out protest posters and handing them to activists to copy and wheat-paste all over the financial district [...] After three days, the word went out that there was an apartment near the protest camp where you could find hot drinks, basic medical attention and a place to charge your gadgets and file copy. The flat became a temporary sanctuary for stray activists and journalists."

Author Matt Taibbi called Crabapple "Occupy's greatest artist," noting the use of the "vampire squid" theme in her Occupy artwork. Crabapple had read Taibbi's 2009 Rolling Stone article "The Great American Bubble Machine," in which Taibbi called Goldman Sachs "a great vampire squid wrapped around the face of humanity". When Crabapple used Taibbi's metaphor as a stencil depicting a vampire squid and released it for anyone to use, it went viral throughout the Occupy movement.

On September 17, 2012, Crabapple was among a group of protesters arrested during a rally to mark the one-year anniversary of the Occupy Wall Street movement. She wrote about her experience in a CNN opinion piece. In 2013, the Museum of Modern Art acquired "Poster for the May Day General Strike, 2012" for its Occuprint Portfolio. The poster is a collaborative work by Crabapple, John Leavitt, and Melissa Dowell. It shows a woman holding a match, playing off the word "strike" as an homage to the London matchgirls' strike of 1888.

=== Art projects ===
In September 2011, Crabapple engaged in a week-long performance art piece, Week in Hell. She locked herself inside a hotel room, covered the walls with paper, and spent the next five days filling the paper with illustrations. The project was funded on Kickstarter, garnering 745 backers and over $20,000. In pitching the work, she wrote: "I'm interested in what happens when an artist leaves their studio, their cliches, and their comfort zone and draws beyond the limits of their endurance." Every day of the endeavor was live-streamed to backers. During the week she was continuously visited by friends and fellow artists. A book documenting the project, Art of Molly Crabapple Volume 1: Week in Hell, was released in March 2012.

In 2012, Crabapple raised $30,000 on Kickstarter for The Shell Game, a project involving the creation of ten paintings about the Great Recession. She met her goal in two days, ultimately raising $64,799. An exhibition was held at New York City's Smart Clothes Gallery in April 2013. The show sold out. Uzoamaka Maduka of The American Reader wrote that the paintings were reminiscent of political cartoons during the Gilded Age and the Tammany Hall period of American history, which depicted similar subjects, like "greed, corruption, and structural treason [...] around the American ideal, and how that ideal is both undone and constructed by these forces."

=== Illustrated journalism ===
Starting in 2013, Crabapple began to make trips to the Guantanamo Bay Naval Base to sketch Guantanamo military commission hearings. Her drawings, accompanied by written accounts, were first published in Vice magazine under the title "It Don't Gitmo Better Than This". Further articles and illustrations were released by Vice and The Paris Review.

In 2015, Crabapple collaborated with FUSION on an animation of a series of illustrations and a video which she wrote and narrated. The video portrays how the broken windows policing strategy has been incorporated in New York City and the way it discriminates against ethnic minorities.

Scenes from the Syrian War is a collection of illustrated articles serialized in Vanity Fair and made in collaboration with an anonymous source in Syria. Using photos sent via cellphone, Crabapple recreated rare glimpses of daily life in ISIS-occupied Syria. The series consists of "Scenes from Daily Life in the De Facto Capital of ISIS", which focuses on the city of Raqqa; "Scenes from Daily Life Inside ISIS-Controlled Mosul"; and "Scenes From Inside Aleppo: How Life Has Been Transformed by Rebel Rule".

The Paris Review also featured Crabapple's sketches of anarchist bikers who provided relief following Hurricane Maria.

Crabapple joined In These Times magazine as an artist-at-large in August 2026.

=== Books ===
External videos
- Presentation by Crabapple on Drawing Blood, November 30, 2015, C-SPAN
- Presentation by Crabbapple on Brothers of the Gun, May 25, 2018, C-SPAN

==== Drawing Blood ====
In December 2015, HarperCollins published Crabapple's illustrated memoir, Drawing Blood. Most of the book covers the period in her early and mid-20s, in which she supported herself by burlesque dancing and nude modeling for amateur photographers in rented hotel rooms and on the softcore porn website SuicideGirls. Her experiences of the September 11 attacks, the economic expansion of the early 2000s, the 2008 financial crisis, Occupy Wall Street, and Hurricane Sandy are also covered in the book, which Deb Olin Unferth, reviewing it for The New York Times, said, "reads like a notebook of New York, a cultural history of a certain set." The book emphasizes how these events were interpreted by Crabapple through her art, which includes original illustrations made specifically for the book. As Unferth observed: "What makes the book captivating and sets it apart from other descriptions of these much-reported events is how it is essentially one long glorious description of what Crabapple drew and why she drew it."

Brian Castner, reviewing the memoir for The Daily Beast, said that "Drawing Blood might be the sexiest thing you read this year," calling the book "a remarkable read, dripping in old-fashioned sex, drugs, and rock and roll [...] a rewarding creation story, the tale of how Jennifer Caban, a shy and shame-filled Puerto Rican-Jewish girl from Queens, became Molly Crabapple: empowered sex-positive feminist, resident-artist of a worldwide movement, and producer of murals that have been compared to Diego Rivera, Bruegel the Elder, and Cirque du Soleil."

==== Brothers of the Gun ====
In May 2018, Penguin Random House published Brothers of the Gun, co-written (and illustrated) by Crabapple and Marwan Hisham. The book offers an intimate view into the lives of three friends during the beginning of the 2011 Syrian protests through its descent into civil war and violent chaos. One friend is killed by regime forces, another becomes a revolutionary Islamist, and Hisham becomes a journalist in exile in Turkey.

Brothers of the Gun received several positive reviews, including a blurb from Angela Davis, who wrote: "A revelatory and necessary read on one of the most destructive wars of our time...In great personal detail, Marwan Hisham and Molly Crabapple poignantly capture the tumultuous life in Syria before, after, and during the war—from inside one young man's consciousness."

==== Here Where We Live Is Our Country ====
In September 2019, it was reported that Crabapple was working on a book on the Jewish Labor Bund, to be published by Random House. The book, Here Where We Live Is Our Country, was released in April 2026 and debuted in fourth position on The New York Times Best Seller list for hardcover non-fiction.

=== Animation ===
In 2010, Crabapple collaborated with Canadian singer Max Fractal and filmmaker Jim Batt on the crowdsourced, stop-motion animated film I Have Your Heart. The film is based on Fractal's song "The Organ Donor's March". They raised $17,000 on Kickstarter from over 400 backers in April 2011.

Crabapple continued her collaboration with Fractal and Batt to create a series of five videos on political topics in 2015 for the media website fusion.net. The videos combine live-drawing and animation with voice-over by Crabapple. Each one delves into a controversial or underreported issue and provides facts and commentary on it.

In 2015, Crabapple, Boekbinder, and Batt collaborated with the Equal Justice Initiative to create the video "Slavery to Mass Incarceration". Crabapple illustrated the animations, paired with executive director Bryan Stevenson's narration, which depict the history of mass enslavement and modern-day mass incarceration.

In 2016, Crabapple animated a video produced and narrated by Jay-Z, "The War on Drugs Is an Epic Fail", which presents a critical view of how federal drug laws instituted by the Nixon administration in 1971, as well as those implemented by New York Governor Nelson Rockefeller, targeted the Black community, resulting in the explosion of the nation's prison population.

In 2017, Crabapple collaborated with Fractal, the ACLU, Laverne Cox, and Zackary Drucker on a video about transgender history and resistance.

=== Other work ===
Crabapple learned Arabic and traveled to Turkey and Turkish Kurdistan. Near the Syrian border, she was briefly detained by police. Her impressions of the artistry and culture of the Ottoman Empire in the Near East influenced her style and work.

In 2012, Crabapple was one of several artists CNN commissioned to illustrate the theme of power for a digital art gallery pertaining to the 2012 presidential election, as well as the forces that drive debates over controversial issues such as money, health, race, and gender. Crabapple created the illustration "Big Fish Eat Little Fish Eat Big Fish" for the gallery.

== Political views ==
Crabapple is a self-identified socialist, and Anti-Zionist, who has expressed support and admiration for the Jewish Labour Bund and the concept of Doikayt. She opposes the Israeli government and is critical of their conduct in Gaza, calling Zionism "very much a fascist movement, as it is now". Crapabble's opposition to Zionism comes from a broader opposition to ethnonationalism, stating in an interview that "all ethno-nationalist ideologies rely on mass murder at the end". She has also said that Zionism has "colonised" Jewish history.

Crabapple is an active member of the Democratic Socialists of America (DSA) and has endorsed several DSA-backed candidates publicly throughout the 2020s, especially in the 2026 midterms. She is also a supporter of the Occupy Wall Street movement.

== Style and influence ==
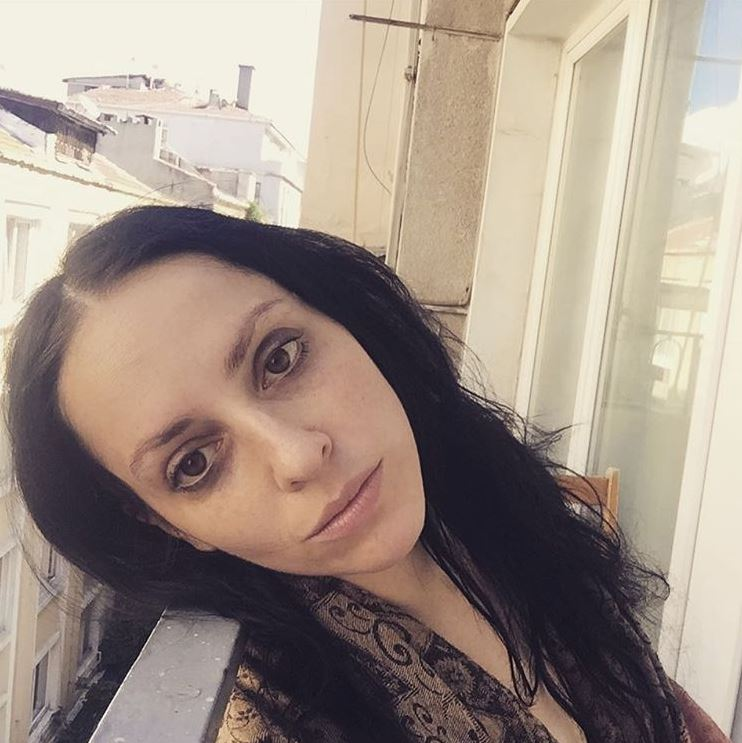
2016 self-portrait

Crabapple uses a crosshatch style of illustration based on Arthur L. Guptill's art technique found in Rendering in Pen and Ink (1976), originally published as Drawing with Pen and Ink (1928). Her style is influenced by Flemish Renaissance painter Pieter Bruegel the Elder, English illustrator Aubrey Beardsley, French painter Henri de Toulouse-Lautrec, Russian-American artist Zoetica Ebb, American artist Travis Louie, American photographer Clayton Cubitt, and American illustrator Fred Harper.

German newspaper Der Spiegel called her approach to writing unique, saying she had created a new role, that of the political journalist-artist ("die politische Journalistenkünstlerin"), and in October 2016 Time magazine named her one of its Next Generation Leaders, "sketching from the front lines of conflicts in the U.S. and around the world", writing: "Her work is a perfect slow-media commentary on our current fast-media climate."

Crabapple has also criticized the use of generative artificial intelligence in art and publishing. In 2022, she criticized the use of copyrighted artworks to train generative AI systems, arguing that datasets such as LAION-5B should be rebuilt using voluntarily submitted works. In 2023, she co-authored an open letter calling for restrictions on the use of AI-generated illustrations in publishing and newsrooms, and raised concerns about the use of artists' work to train generative AI systems without their consent or compensation, calling the use of images without the author's consent as "vampiric AI". In 2026, she expanded on these criticisms in an article for The Guardian, discussing the appropriation of artworks for AI training and its effects on illustrators and other creative workers.

== Publications ==
- Dr. Sketchy's Official Rainy Day Colouring Book (2006)
- Scarlett Takes Manhattan (2009)
- Art of Molly Crabapple Volume 1: Week in Hell (2012)
- Art of Molly Crabapple Volume 2: Devil in the Details (2012)
- Drawing Blood (2015)
- Brothers of the Gun (2018)
- Here Where We Live Is Our Country: The Story of the Jewish Bund (2026)
