= Who Cares? (Gnarls Barkley song) =

"Who Cares?" / "Gone Daddy Gone"
- CD1 cover

Single by Gnarls Barkley

from the album St. Elsewhere
- Released: November 6, 2006
- Genre: Indie rock
- Length: 2:27 ("Who Cares?"); 2:28 ("Gone Daddy Gone")
- Label: Warner Music
- Songwriters: Brian Burton; Thomas Callaway; Keith Mansfield; Gordon Gano; Willie Dixon
- Producer: Danger Mouse

Gnarls Barkley singles chronology
"Smiley Faces" (2006)	"Who Cares?" / "Gone Daddy Gone" (2006)	"Run (I'm a Natural Disaster)" (2008)

Audio sample
- file; help

"Who Cares?" and "Gone Daddy Gone" are songs performed by Gnarls Barkley and are featured on their debut studio album, St. Elsewhere. The songs were released on November 6, 2006 as a double A-side single from that album in the United Kingdom. A week later, on November 13, 2006, the single debuted at No. 60 on the UK Singles Chart. "Gone Daddy Gone" is a cover of the Violent Femmes song. The song peaked at No. 26 on Billboard's Modern Rock Tracks chart, and at No. 35 on Billboard's Adult Top 40 chart. The song "Gone Daddy Gone" is also featured in the soundtrack for the video game Tony Hawk's Project 8, the soundtrack for Forza Motorsport 2 and in the trailer for the Chris Rock film I Think I Love My Wife.

== Music videos ==
On September 29, 2006, the music video for "Gone Daddy Gone" premiered on MTV, MTV2 and Much Music. Directed by Chris Milk, the video features vocalist Cee-Lo, producer Danger Mouse, and the orchestra as fleas who spot a lovely giant woman (played by Danish model Nina Bergman) and chase her, getting slaughtered one by one. A video was also made for "Who Cares?", featuring Mario Van Peebles as a bored Blacula unsuccessfully hitting the bars for a victim, doing routine errands, and finally attacking a young man and watching TV with him. Gnarls Barkley's Myspace account featured screencaps of the video as the background to premiere with the video. The video has also premiered on Myspace's music video section.

== Track listings ==
UK CD1

1. "Who Cares?" (longer version) – 3:00
2. "Gone Daddy Gone" – 2:28

UK CD2

1. "Who Cares?" – 2:14
2. "Gone Daddy Gone" (live from Later with Jools Holland) – 2:40
3. "Who Cares?" (video) – 3:00
4. "Gone Daddy Gone" (video) – 2:36

== Charts ==
=== Weekly charts ===
2006 weekly chart performance for "Who Cares?"
Chart (2006)	Peak position
Scotland Singles (OCC)	36
UK Singles (OCC)	60
UK Hip Hop/R&B (OCC)	6

2006 to 2007 weekly chart performance for "Gone Daddy Gone"
Chart (2006–2007)	Peak position
Australia (ARIA)	90
Germany (GfK)	84
US Adult Pop Airplay (Billboard)	35
US Alternative Airplay (Billboard)	26
