= Gnarls Biggie =

Studio album (bootleg) by SoundAdvice
- Released: July 17, 2006
- Genres: Hip hop, Mashup
- Producer: Sound Advice

Gnarls Biggie is a hip hop mashup album created in the same vein as Danger Mouse's The Grey Album. It was produced by a group of Brooklyn-based DJs known as Sound Advice. The album features 11 songs in which the tracks of Gnarls Barkley are cut-up into beats and then layered with raps of The Notorious B.I.G. It was released on July 17, 2006 on the website gnotorious.com and was featured on the websites of the music magazines VIBE and Spin. There was also a promotional video released on YouTube. Its album cover parodies the cover of The Notorious B.I.G.'s Ready to Die by replacing the baby's head with Cee-Lo's head. All of the tracks on the album use beats that sample Gnarls Barkley's album St. Elsewhere.

The album was also reviewed in the August 10, 2006 issue of Rolling Stone.

== Track listing ==
1. "The Gnotorious B.I.G."
2. "The Last Nasty Boy"
3. "Smiley Faces Hypnotize"
4. "Who's Dead Wrong"
5. "Can I Get With Ya Crazy Butt"
6. "Necromancing Thugs"
7. "Gimme the Online Loot"
8. "Ten Feng Shui Commandments"
9. "Gone, Biggie, Gone"
10. "Just a Party and Bullshit"
11. "Victory Coming"

== See also ==
- Mashup (music)
- The Notorious B.I.G. discography
- St. Elsewhere
