= Atlanta (Gnarls Barkley album) =

Studio album by Gnarls Barkley
- Released: March 6, 2026
- Length: 44:54
- Labels: 10K Projects; Atlantic
- Producer: Danger Mouse

Gnarls Barkley chronology
Who's Gonna Save My Soul (2008)	Atlanta (2026)

Singles from Atlanta
- 1. "Pictures" Released: February 26, 2026

Professional ratings
Review scores
Source	Rating
Mojo	4/5 stars
RapReviews	8/10
Uncut	6/10

Atlanta is the third and final studio album by the American music duo Gnarls Barkley, released on March 6, 2026, by 10K Projects and Atlantic Records.

== Background ==
In 2008, Gnarls Barkley released their second studio album The Odd Couple, which peaked at number 12 on the Billboard 200. The duo went on hiatus for 18 years, until February 26, 2026, when they announced a third and final album. The same day as the announcement, the duo released one of the songs as a single, the song being "Pictures". The album was released on March 6, 2026.

== Release and promotion ==
Atlanta was first teased back in 2013, with CeeLo Green sporadically promising a third Gnarls Barkley album for the ensuing decade-plus. Atlanta was released on March 3, 2026, and has been billed as the duo's final album. The album has 13 tracks, including the single "Pictures".

Green stated of the song:

"Pictures" is like going back to square one, It's a full circle moment. The spirit of Gnarls Barkley is always self-discovery. The sweet, the sad, and the strange. The universe, the adventure inside of yourself [...] The song came from a childhood experience. I had a middle school principal who, every Friday would tell me to go when I would get to school. Without fail. I was in 8th grade and I would leave school and ride the train alone from 8 a.m. until 2:30 p.m. The hook of the song is literally about being on the train. When you are in transit it's like a motion picture passing you by… staring out the window of the MARTA train.

== Track listing ==
Atlanta track listing
No.	Title	Writer(s)	Length
1.	"Tomorrow Died Today"	Brian Burton; Thomas Callaway; Carlos Da Silva; Carlos Piazzoli; Luiz Thomaz	3:52
2.	"I Amnesia"	Burton; Callaway; Dan Auerbach; Jarrett Mumford	3:57
3.	"Pictures"	Burton; Callaway	3:56
4.	"Line Dance"	Burton; Callaway; Chuck Perrin	2:59
5.	"Turn Your Heart Back On"	Burton; Callaway; Lorin Brown; Solomon Cunningham	3:07
6.	"Let Me Be"	Burton; Callaway; Rod Lynton	3:09
7.	"Cyberbully (Yayo)"	Burton; Callaway; Trevor Bastow; Paul Beauregard; Jordan Houston; Barrett Strong; Norman Whitfield	4:00
8.	"Perfect Time"	Burton; Callaway; Christian Koerts; Hans Ziech	3:09
9.	"Sweet Evil"	Burton; Callaway; Samuel Cohen	4:51
10.	"Boy Genius"	Burton; Callaway	3:03
11.	"The Be Be King"	Burton; Callaway; Laurent Thibault; Alain Zisa	2:22
12.	"Sorry"	Burton; Callaway; Jason Lytle	3:52
13.	"Accept It"	Burton; Callaway; Cohen	2:37
Total length:			44:54

== Personnel ==
Credits adapted from Tidal.

=== Gnarls Barkley ===
- CeeLo Green – vocals (all tracks), additional engineering (track 5)
- Danger Mouse – production (all tracks), programming (1, 2, 4–13), synthesizer (1, 3–6, 8–13), organ (2, 3); drums, piano (3)

=== Additional contributors ===
- Kennie Takahashi – engineering, mixing
- Todd Monfalcone – engineering (2)
- Josh Connolly – additional engineering, additional programming (1–5, 7, 8, 10, 11)
- Sean Phelan – additional engineering (5)
- Joe LaPorta – mastering
- Dan Auerbach – bass, guitar (2)
- Jay Mumford – drums (2)
- Sam Cohen – bass (3, 5, 9, 12, 13); drums, guitar (12)
- Jason Lytle – piano (12)

== Charts ==
Chart (2026)	Peak position
Croatian International Albums (HDU)	15
Hungarian Physical Albums (MAHASZ)	19
