= Going On =

Single by Gnarls Barkley

from the album The Odd Couple
- Released: June 24, 2008
- Recorded: 2008
- Genre: Soul, R&B
- Length: 2:54
- Label: Warner Music
- Songwriters: Danger Mouse; Cee-Lo Green
- Producer: Danger Mouse

Gnarls Barkley singles chronology
"Run" (2008)	"Going On" (2008)	"Who's Gonna Save My Soul" (2008)

"Going On" is the second single taken from Gnarls Barkley's second studio album The Odd Couple. It is played in an upbeat hip hop and blues style. The track is also featured on the video game NBA 2K9 as well as the video game NBA 2K16. It was nominated at the 2009 Grammy Awards for 'Best Pop Performance'. "Going On" uses a sample from the track "Folder Man" by Please. The sample is repeated throughout the song, and comes from 1:30–1:35 from the original song. The song is also featured in a 2010 FIFA World Cup commercial by Puma AG, entitled 'The Journey of Football', featuring the Ghanaian national football team. The single was only released on a promotional format.

== Music video ==
The music video was released on May 9, 2008. It was shot in Jamaica and revolves around a group of people celebrating the discovery of a door that leads to another dimension. Gnarls Barkley does not appear in the video, but one of the main characters does the lip-synching of the song for the first verse. After that, the lead male and female in the video carry the door to a distant field. They then watch as the door opens. The female then throws a rock through the open doorway and, as it reaches the threshold, the space inside the frame splits into several shards of different colors. The two crouch down slowly in front of the door, exchange a glance, and then the male sprints toward the open door and disappears. On the other side of the door, where the male would have appeared had he not disappeared, the words "DON'T FOLLOW ME" appear. The female does not see the words and also sprints towards the door and likewise disappears.

The video was directed by Wendy Morgan – a music video and commercial director. The video draws stylistic inspiration from photographer Clayton James Cubitt's fashion series "Lagos Calling."

In July 2011, the music video was named one of "The 30 All-Time Best Music Videos" by Time.

== Track listing ==
1. "Going On" - 2:55

== Charts ==
Chart (2008)	Peak position
Australian ARIA Singles Chart	79
Canadian Hot 100	52
UK Singles Chart	143
U.S. Billboard Hot 100	88
U.S. Billboard Pop 100	64
Chart (2010)	Peak position
French Digital Singles Chart	8
