= The Odd Couple (album) =

2008 album by Gnarls Barkley

Studio album by Gnarls Barkley
- Released: March 18, 2008
- Recorded: 2007–2008
- Genre: Psychedelic soul; avant-pop
- Length: 39:12
- Label: Downtown; Atlantic; Warner Bros.; Lex
- Producer: Danger Mouse

Gnarls Barkley chronology
St. Elsewhere (2006)	The Odd Couple (2008)	Atlanta (2026)

Singles from The Odd Couple
- 1. "Run (I'm a Natural Disaster)" Released: February 5, 2008; 2. "Going On" Released: June 24, 2008; 3. "Who's Gonna Save My Soul" Released: September 4, 2008

Professional ratings
Aggregate scores
Source	Rating
Metacritic	76/100
Review scores
Source	Rating
AllMusic	3.5/5 stars
DJBooth.net	4/5 stars
The Guardian	4/5 stars
NME	8/10
The Observer	4/5 stars
Pitchfork	7.2/10
PopMatters	9/10
RapReviews	9/10
Rolling Stone	3.5/5 stars
Uncut	4/5 stars

The Odd Couple is the second studio album by Gnarls Barkley, released digitally on March 18 and physically on March 25, 2008. Due to an early leak of the album over the Internet in early March 2008, the duo decided to push up the release from April 8. The album was released to the iTunes Store and Amazon MP3 on March 18.

As of October 2010 the album has sold 250,000 copies in United States according to Nielsen SoundScan.

== Background ==
In late January, an assumed leaked track appeared on several music blogs. "Run (I'm a Natural Disaster)", the previously unknown song, was given positive reviews from most music outlets. "Run" was released as the album's first single as a digital download in the US on February 5, 2008. Despite "Run (I'm a Natural Disaster)" being the lead single at the time, "Going On" was the highest-charting album track on iTunes having made it as high as number 23 on the Top 100 chart as of March 25, subsequently debuting at number 88 on the Billboard Hot 100. The song was then released as the second single from the album, and the song's video premiered on March 20, 2008. In March 2008, the album's third single, "Who's Gonna Save My Soul" was premiered by hip hop band The Roots' drummer Questlove through a video uploaded to YouTube. The album also features Josh Klinghoffer, a touring musician for the band since 2006 and who would a year following the album's release join the Red Hot Chili Peppers as their guitarist.

An early leak of the album over the Internet in early March, 2008, prompted the duo to push the release of the album from April 8. Digital versions of The Odd Couple were released to the iTunes Store and Amazon MP3 on March 18. Physical copies of the album were slated for March 25; however, some copies hit independent record stores on March 18. The album was released in the United Kingdom on March 31, 2008. An instrumental reverse edition of the album, retitled elpuoc ddo eht, was released on April 17, 2008. The entire album is fused into one 38:44 track played completely in reverse, starting with the album's last song and ending with the album's first. This unorthodox edition was released officially by Danger Mouse and is legally available as a second disc on the vinyl edition of the album.

== Track listing ==
All tracks are written by Brian Burton and Thomas Callaway, with additional writers noted. All tracks produced by Danger Mouse, except "A Little Better", co-produced by Nigel Godrich.

No.	Title	Writer(s)	Length
1.	"Charity Case"		3:12
2.	"Who's Gonna Save My Soul"	Francesco De Masi	3:15
3.	"Going On"	Peter Dunton	2:54
4.	"Run (I'm a Natural Disaster)"	Keith Mansfield	2:44
5.	"Would Be Killer"	John Charles Alder	2:22
6.	"Open Book"		3:20
7.	"Whatever"	Ronald Blackwell	2:18
8.	"Surprise"	Gene Allen; Ron Dante; Bobby Feldman	3:50
9.	"No Time Soon"		2:55
10.	"She Knows"	Cy Payne	2:44
11.	"Blind Mary"		3:25
12.	"Neighbors"	Nico Fidenco	3:05
13.	"A Little Better"	Pierre Naçabal; Michel Yvon Goudy	3:07
Total length:			39:12

== Samples ==
- "Going On" samples "Folder Man" written by Peter Dunton and performed by Please
- "Run (I'm a Natural Disaster)" samples "Junior Jet Set" by Keith Mansfield
- "Would Be Killer" samples "Fluid" by Twink
- "Open Book" incorporates sampled elements from "Träume" by Françoise Hardy
- "Whatever" samples "The Hair On My Chinny Chin Chin" by Sam the Sham & the Pharaohs
- "Surprise" contains elements of "Building with a Steeple" written by Ron Dante, Gene Allen and Bobby Feldman and performed by The Eighth Day
- "She Knows" samples "Gentle Flute" performed by Cy Payne
- "A Little Better" incorporates elements of "Trying to Be Free" written by Nacabal and Yvon-Goudy and performed by T.N.T.H.

== Charts ==
=== Weekly charts ===
Chart (2008)	Peak position
Australian Albums (ARIA)	20
Austrian Albums (Ö3 Austria)	32
Belgian Albums (Ultratop Flanders)	26
Belgian Albums (Ultratop Wallonia)	96
Canadian Albums (Billboard)	21
Danish Albums (Hitlisten)	26
Dutch Albums (Album Top 100)	60
French Albums (SNEP)	63
German Albums (Offizielle Top 100)	58
Irish Albums (IRMA)	31
Scottish Albums (OCC)	29
Swedish Albums (Sverigetopplistan)	59
Swiss Albums (Schweizer Hitparade)	16
UK Albums (OCC)	19
UK R&B Albums (OCC)	7
US Billboard 200	12
US Top Dance Albums (Billboard)	1
US Top R&B/Hip-Hop Albums (Billboard)	14

=== Year-end charts ===
Chart (2008)	Position
US Top Dance/Electronic Albums (Billboard)	4
