= 2008 MTV Video Music Awards =

Award ceremony

- Date: Sunday, September 7, 2008
- Location: Paramount Pictures Studios (Los Angeles, California)
- Country: United States
- Hosted by: Russell Brand

Highlights
- Most awards: Britney Spears (3)
- Most nominations: The Pussycat Dolls (6)
- Website: http://www.mtv.com/ontv/vma/past-vmas/2008/

Television/radio coverage
- Network: MTV
- Produced by: Jesse Ignjatovic; Dave Sirulnick
- Directed by: Joe DeMaio

The 2008 MTV Video Music Awards took place on September 7, 2008, live from Paramount Pictures Studios (which, like MTV, is owned by Viacom), honoring the best music videos from the previous year. Nominations for a majority of the categories were announced on the MTV program FNMTV after being selected through viewer online voting at MTV.com. The remaining, professional categories were chosen by a panel of music industry professionals and announced via press release on August 27. When the nomination process was first announced, it mentioned a previously-unheard professional category named "Best Story;" however, this award did not come to fruition when the list of professional nominees was revealed the following month.

Unlike previous editions of the show, MTV announced the winners to the professional categories three days before the ceremony (September 4) via a press release, rather than on the pre-show or main show. The rest of the winners were announced during the ceremony. Comedian Russell Brand hosted the event.

This year's awards were a huge improvement ratings-wise, seeing a 19% rise on last year with 8.4 million viewers. It was also a 23% advance over the 5.76 million who saw the 2006 ceremony. Although ratings improved, this year's video music awards was hosted at its smallest venue of its 25-year history. Britney Spears became the main winner of the night, walking away with her first three Moonmen: Video of the Year, Best Female Video, and Best Pop Video all for "Piece of Me".

The Pussycat Dolls received the most nominations (6), followed by Chris Brown and Katy Perry (5).

== Winners and nominees ==
Winners are in bold text.

Video of the Year	Best Male Video
**Britney Spears – "Piece of Me"**; Chris Brown – "Forever"; Jonas Brothers – "Burnin' Up"; The Pussycat Dolls – "When I Grow Up"; The Ting Tings – "Shut Up and Let Me Go"	**Chris Brown – "With You"**; Flo Rida (featuring T-Pain) – "Low"; Lil Wayne (featuring Static Major) – "Lollipop"; T.I. – "No Matter What"; Usher (featuring Young Jeezy) – "Love in This Club"
Best Female Video	Best New Artist
**Britney Spears – "Piece of Me"**; Mariah Carey – "Touch My Body"; Katy Perry – "I Kissed a Girl"; Rihanna – "Take a Bow"; Jordin Sparks (featuring Chris Brown) – "No Air"	**Tokio Hotel – "Ready, Set, Go!"**; Miley Cyrus – "7 Things"; Katy Perry – "I Kissed a Girl"; Jordin Sparks (featuring Chris Brown) – "No Air"; Taylor Swift – "Teardrops on My Guitar"
Best Pop Video	Best Rock Video
**Britney Spears – "Piece of Me"**; Danity Kane – "Damaged"; Jonas Brothers – "Burnin' Up"; Panic at the Disco – "Nine in the Afternoon"; Tokio Hotel – "Ready, Set, Go!"	**Linkin Park – "Shadow of the Day"**; Fall Out Boy (featuring John Mayer) – "Beat It"; Foo Fighters – "The Pretender"; Paramore – "Crushcrushcrush"; Slipknot – "Psychosocial"
Best Hip-Hop Video	Best Dancing in a Video
**Lil Wayne (featuring Static Major) – "Lollipop"**; Mary J. Blige – "Just Fine"; Lupe Fiasco (featuring Matthew Santos) – "Superstar"; Flo Rida (featuring T-Pain) – "Low"; Kanye West (featuring Chris Martin) – "Homecoming"	**The Pussycat Dolls – "When I Grow Up"**; Chris Brown – "Forever"; Danity Kane – "Damaged"; Madonna (featuring Justin Timberlake and Timbaland) – "4 Minutes"; Ne-Yo – "Closer"
Best Direction	Best Choreography
**Erykah Badu – "Honey" (Directors: Erykah Badu and Mr. Roboto)**; Linkin Park – "Shadow of the Day" (Director: Joe Hahn); Panic at the Disco – "Nine in the Afternoon" (Director: Shane Drake); The Pussycat Dolls – "When I Grow Up" (Director: Joseph Kahn); Rihanna – "Take a Bow" (Director: Anthony Mandler)	**Gnarls Barkley – "Run" (Choreographer: Michael Rooney)**; Adele – "Chasing Pavements" (Choreographer: Marguerite Derricks); Chris Brown – "Forever" (Choreographers: Tone & Rich); Chris Brown (featuring T-Pain) – "Kiss Kiss" (Choreographer: Flii Stylz); The Pussycat Dolls – "When I Grow Up" (Choreographers: Robin Antin and Mikey Minden)
Best Special Effects	Best Art Direction
**Kanye West (featuring T-Pain) – "Good Life" (Special Effects: SoMe, Jonas & François)**; Erykah Badu – "Honey" (Special Effects: X1 FX); Coldplay – "Violet Hill" (Special Effects: Asa Mader); Missy Elliott – "Ching-a-Ling/Shake Your Pom Pom" (Special Effects: Les Umberger); Linkin Park – "Bleed It Out" (Special Effects: David Lebensfeld and Adam Catino)	**Gnarls Barkley – "Run" (Art Directors: Happy Massee and Kells Jesse)**; MGMT – "Electric Feel" (Art Director: Sophie Kosofsky); Katy Perry – "I Kissed a Girl" (Art Director: Benji Bamps); The Pussycat Dolls – "When I Grow Up" (Art Director: Marcelle Gravel); The White Stripes – "Conquest" (Art Director: David Fitzpatrick)
Best Editing	Best Cinematography
**Death Cab for Cutie – "I Will Possess Your Heart" (Editors: Aaron Stewart-Ahn and Jeff Buchanan)**; Erykah Badu – "Honey" (Editor: T. David Binns); Ne-Yo – "Closer" (Editor: Clark Eddy); Katy Perry – "I Kissed a Girl" (Editor: Tom Lindsay); Weezer – "Pork and Beans" (Editors: Jeff Consiglio and Colin Woods)	**The White Stripes – "Conquest" (Director of Photography: Wyatt Troll)**; Erykah Badu – "Honey" (Director of Photography: Karsten "Crash" Gopinath); Death Cab for Cutie – "I Will Possess Your Heart" (Directors of Photography: Aaron Stewart-Ahn and Shawn Kim); Katy Perry – "I Kissed a Girl" (Director of Photography: Simon Thirlaway); The Pussycat Dolls – "When I Grow Up" (Director of Photography: Christopher Probst)
Best UK Video
**The Ting Tings – "Shut Up and Let Me Go"**; Coldplay – "Violet Hill"; Duffy – "Warwick Avenue"; Estelle (featuring Kanye West) – "American Boy"; Leona Lewis – "Bleeding Love"

== Artists with multiple wins and nominations ==
Artists who received multiple awards
Wins	Artist
3	Britney Spears
2	Gnarls Barkley

Artists who received multiple nominations
Nominations	Artist
6	The Pussycat Dolls
5	Chris Brown
5	Katy Perry
4	Erykah Badu
3	Britney Spears
3	Linkin Park
2	Coldplay
2	Danity Kane
2	Death Cab for Cutie
2	Flo Rida
2	Gnarls Barkley
2	Jonas Brothers
2	Jordin Sparks
2	Kanye West
2	Lil Wayne
2	Ne-Yo
2	Panic! at the Disco
2	Rihanna
2	The Ting Tings
2	The White Stripes
2	Tokio Hotel

== Music Videos with multiple wins and nominations ==
Music Videos that received multiple awards
Wins	Artist	Music Video
3	Britney Spears	"Piece of Me"
2	Gnarls Barkley	"Run"

Music Videos that received multiple nominations
Nominations	Artist	Music Video
6	The Pussycat Dolls	"When I Grow Up"
5	Katy Perry	"I Kissed a Girl"
4	Erykah Badu	"Honey"
3	Britney Spears	"Piece of Me"
3	Chris Brown	"Forever"
2	Coldplay	"Violet Hill"
2	Danity Kane	"Damaged"
2	Death Cab for Cutie	"I Will Possess Your Heart"
2	Flo Rida (featuring T-Pain)	"Low"
2	Gnarls Barkley	"Run"
2	Jonas Brothers	"Burnin' Up"
2	Jordin Sparks (featuring Chris Brown)	"No Air"
2	Lil Wayne (featuring Static Major)	"Lollipop"
2	Linkin Park	"Shadow of the Day"
2	Ne-Yo	"Closer"
2	Panic! at the Disco	"Nine in the Afternoon"
2	Rihanna	"Take a Bow"
2	The Ting Tings	"Shut Up and Let Me Go"
2	The White Stripes	"Conquest"
2	Tokio Hotel	"Ready, Set, Go!"

== Performances ==
=== Pre-show ===
- Dance-off: Fanny Pak vs. Kaba Modern (winner, as chosen by the audience via online voting, got $25,000 for charity and the opportunity of presenting the award for Best Dancing in a Video during the main show)

=== Main stage ===
- Rihanna – "Disturbia"/"Seven Nation Army"
- Lil Wayne (featuring Leona Lewis and T-Pain) – "DontGetIt"/"Misunderstood"/"A Milli"/"Got Money"
- Paramore – "Misery Business"
- Christina Aguilera – "Genie 2.0"/"Keeps Gettin' Better"
- Kid Rock (featuring Lil Wayne) – "All Summer Long"
- Kanye West – "Love Lockdown"

=== Back lot (off stage) ===
- Jonas Brothers – "Lovebug"
- Pink – "So What"
- T.I. (featuring Rihanna) – "Whatever You Like" (back lot)/"Live Your Life" (main stage)

=== DJ AM and Travis Barker performances ===
DJ AM and Travis Barker performed small interludes consisting of remixes of past hits throughout the show, as well as teaming up with Katy Perry, The Ting Tings and Lupe Fiasco to perform their own singles and MTV classics from the past 25 years.

- Katy Perry – "Like a Virgin"/"I Kissed a Girl"
- The Ting Tings – "Shut Up and Let Me Go"
- LL Cool J – "Going Back to Cali"
- Lupe Fiasco (featuring Matthew Santos) – "Superstar"

==== Remixes ====
DJ AM and Travis Barker also played remixes of the following songs in the lead-up to or return from commercial breaks.

- Oasis – "Wonderwall"
- a-ha – "Take On Me"
- M.I.A. – "Bucky Done Gun"
- Rage Against the Machine – "Killing in the Name"

== Presenters ==
- Britney Spears – opened the show and welcomed the audience
- Jonah Hill – appeared in Spears's opening sketch
- Jamie Foxx – presented Best Female Video
- Pete Wentz, Heidi Montag and Spencer Pratt – introduced Best New Artist voting
- Demi Moore – presented Best Male Video
- Taylor Swift – introduced the Jonas Brothers. Co-hosted the pre-show.
- Michael Phelps – introduced Lil' Wayne
- Ciara, Lindsay Lohan and Fanny Pak – introduced winner of dance-off (Lohan and Ciara) and presented Best Dancing in a Video
- Pete Wentz and Danity Kane – introduced Best New Artist voting
- Robert Pattinson, Cam Gigandet, Taylor Lautner and Kristen Stewart – introduced Paramore
- Slash and Shia LaBeouf – presented Best Rock Video
- Miley Cyrus – introduced Pink
- Pete Wentz and Ashlee Simpson – introduced Best New Artist voting
- Slipknot (Corey Taylor, Jim Root and Shawn "Clown" Crahan) and Christopher Mintz-Plasse – presented Best Hip-Hop Video
- John Legend and Jordin Sparks – introduced T.I. and Rihanna
- Zac Efron, Vanessa Hudgens, Ashley Tisdale and Corbin Bleu – introduced Christina Aguilera
- Lauren Conrad and Chace Crawford – presented Best New Artist in a Video
- Paris Hilton – presented Best Pop Video
- Drake Bell and Josh Peck – introduced Kid Rock
- Kobe Bryant – presented Video of the Year

== Controversy ==
One of host Brand's jokes during the night centered around purity rings, specifically those worn by the Jonas Brothers. Jordin Sparks, who also wears a purity ring, began her introduction of T.I. and Rihanna by saying, "It's not bad to wear a promise ring because not everybody, guy or girl, wants to be a slut." Sparks was criticized for implying that those who do not wear purity rings or do not abstain are promiscuous.

Brand later described the experience, and aftermath, during his 2009 comedy special 'Scandalous - Live at the O2'.

== Censorship ==
In repeat airings all references to John McCain and George W. Bush were removed from Russell Brand's opening monologue.

== Promotion ==
Several Promos were made that featured host Russell Brand and MTV regulars Britney Spears, Pete Wentz, and LL Cool J. Britney Spears' promos were given a lot of attention. The promos featured Spears and Brand in a Paramount lot ad-libbing while an elephant was positioned in the background, reference to "the elephant in the room", rumored to be her criticized 2007 VMA performance, which they refrained from discussing in the commercials.

There was also a promotion that appeared on Nickelodeon, featuring the cast of iCarly.

During the program, the MTV networks VH1, MTV Hits, and MTV Jams did not air their usual programming at all, instead displaying full-screen cards guiding viewers to watch the ceremony on MTV, with VH1 using a rotating "billboard" of sponsors to promote 'sneak peeks' of the live ceremony which appeared in the top-left corner with false crowd noise in the background. During the VMA commercial breaks, VH1 also carried regular advertising.

== See also ==
- 2008 MTV Europe Music Awards
