= St. Elsewhere (album) =

2006 album by Gnarls Barkley

Studio album by Gnarls Barkley
- Released: April 24, 2006
- Recorded: 2005–2006
- Genres: Neo soul; psychedelic rock; psychedelic soul; hip hop
- Length: 37:20
- Labels: Downtown; Atlantic; Warner Bros.; Lex
- Producer: Danger Mouse

Gnarls Barkley chronology
St. Elsewhere (2006)	The Odd Couple (2008)

Singles from St. Elsewhere
- 1. "Crazy" Released: March 13, 2006; 2. "Smiley Faces" Released: July 17, 2006; 3. "Who Cares?" / "Gone Daddy Gone" Released: November 6, 2006

St. Elsewhere is the debut studio album by American soul duo Gnarls Barkley. It was released on April 24, 2006, in the United Kingdom, where it debuted at number one on the UK Albums Chart, and on May 9, 2006, in the United States, although it was available for purchase one week earlier as a digital download in the US iTunes Store. St. Elsewhere debuted at No. 20 on the US Billboard 200, and peaked at No. 4. It topped the Billboard Dance/Electronic Albums chart for 39 non-consecutive weeks in 2006 and 2007.

The album's first single, "Crazy", was the first song to become a UK number-one single based solely on downloads. The album was certified double platinum in the US by the RIAA, for shipping 2,000,000 units with "Crazy" receiving an eight-times platinum certification. A limited edition deluxe package of St. Elsewhere was released on November 7, 2006. The CD + DVD package includes a 92-page booklet, four music videos, and bonus songs from live performances. It was also released on vinyl.

== Background ==
The group created an elaborate backstory for the "Gnarls Barkley" persona, claiming to be close friends of Lester Bangs, Isaac Hayes, Gordon Gano, and lovers of Janet Jackson and Mariah Carey. The character taught the band Kraftwerk English, as well as set up a meeting between the group Wu-Tang Clan and members of the Stuckist art movement. In promotional photographs, the group wears costumes similar to the character Alex from A Clockwork Orange.

== Composition ==
In an interview with New York, Gnarls Barkley were asked if they intended to make a contemporary psychedelic record with St. Elsewhere. Producer Danger Mouse agreed, wishing to fuse melody with experimentation like late-1960s music he admired. Indeed, Elsewhere sees Cee-lo Green's neo soul style set against Mouse's psychedelic rock / soul-infused music. "Creepy-crawly" also features hip hop, yielding a "big [and] amorphous" take on the genre.

== Critical reception and awards ==
Professional ratings
Aggregate scores
Source	Rating
Metacritic	81/100
Review scores
Source	Rating
AllMusic	4.5/5 stars
The A.V. Club	B+
Entertainment Weekly	A
The Guardian	4/5 stars
The Independent	4/5 stars
Los Angeles Times	4/4 stars
NME	8/10
Pitchfork	7.7/10
Rolling Stone	3.5/5 stars
Spin	4/5 stars

The album received general acclaim from critics: At Metacritic, which assigns a normalized rating out of 100 to reviews from mainstream critics, the album received an average score of 81 out of 100, which indicates "universal acclaim", based on 37 reviews. It was rated the best release of 2006 by PopMatters. In 2007, the album won the Grammy Award for Best Alternative Music Album, with nominations for Album of the Year and Record of the Year for "Crazy". St. Elsewhere placed on Slant Magazine's list of best albums of the 2000s at number 92.

== Track listing ==
All tracks are written by Brian Burton and Thomas Callaway, with additional writers noted. All tracks are produced by Danger Mouse.

No.	Title	Writer(s)	Length
1.	"Go-Go Gadget Gospel"	Nicolas Flagello^{[a]}	2:19
2.	"Crazy"	Gian Franco Reverberi^{[b]}; Gian Piero Reverberi^{[b]}	2:58
3.	"St. Elsewhere"	Barry Clarke^{[c]}; David Costa^{[c]}; Celia Humphris^{[c]}; Stephen Brown^{[c]}	2:30
4.	"Gone Daddy Gone"	Gordon Gano; Willie Dixon	2:28
5.	"Smiley Faces"		3:05
6.	"The Boogie Monster"	Armando Trovaioli^{[d]}; Angelo Francesco Lavagnino^{[d]}	2:50
7.	"Feng Shui"	Nino Nardini^{[e]}	1:26
8.	"Just a Thought"	Kevin Peek^{[f]}	3:42
9.	"Transformer"	Marlene Moore^{[g]}	2:17
10.	"Who Cares?"	Keith Mansfield^{[h]}	2:27
11.	"Online"		1:48
12.	"Necromancer"		2:57
13.	"Storm Coming"		3:08
14.	"The Last Time"	Ian Langley^{[i]}	3:25
Total length:			37:20

iTunes bonus tracks
No.	Title	Length
15.	"Crazy" (Instrumental)	3:00
16.	"Go-Go Gadget Gospel" (Instrumental)	2:14

Amazon bonus tracks
No.	Title	Length
15.	"Transformer" (Instrumental)	2:10
16.	"The Boogie Monster" (Instrumental)	2:49

Deluxe edition bonus DVD
No.	Title	Length
1.	"Crazy" (Video)
2.	"Gone Daddy Gone" (Video)
3.	"Smiley Faces" (Video)
4.	"Go Go Gadget Gospel" (Video)
5.	"Gone Daddy Gone" (T4 Live)
6.	"Who Cares?" (T4 Live)
7.	"The Boogie Monster" (T4 Live)
8.	"Smiley Faces" (T4 Live)
9.	"Crazy" (T4 Live)
10.	"Crazy" (Live on Top of the Pops)
11.	"Gone Daddy Gone" (Live on Later... with Jools Holland)

Sample credits

- ^{^[a]} "Go-Go Gadget Gospel" contains samples from "Goin Down to Freedom's Land", written and performed by Nicolas Flagello.
- ^{^[b]} "Crazy" incorporates elements and samples of "Last Man Standing", written and performed by Gian Franco Reverberi and Gian Piero Reverberi.
- ^{^[c]} "St. Elsewhere" incorporates elements of "Geordie", arranged by Barry Clarke, David Costa, Celia Humphris, and Stephen Brown, and performed by Trees.
- ^{^[d]} "The Boogie Monster" incorporates elements and samples of "Ku Klux Klan Sequence", written and performed by Armando Trovaioli and Angelo Francesco Lavagnino.
- ^{^[e]} "Feng Shui" incorporates elements and samples of "Tropical", written and performed by Nino Nardini.
- ^{^[f]} "Just a Thought" incorporates elements of "A Touch of Class", written and performed by Kevin Peek.
- ^{^[g]} "Transformer" incorporates elements of "Rubber Solution", written by Marlene Moore and performed by Lee Mason.
- ^{^[h]} "Who Cares?" incorporates elements of "Mono Ski", written and performed by Keith Mansfield.
- ^{^[i]} "The Last Time" incorporates elements and samples of "Chicano Chaser", written and performed by Ian Langley.

== Personnel ==
Credits adapted from the album's liner notes.

Gnarls Barkley

- Danger Mouse – production, mixing
- Cee-Lo Green – vocals

Additional musicians

- Ced Keys International – piano (1), synthesizers (12)
- Daniele Luppi – arrangements (3, 8, 10—12), organ (3, 10), synth bass (3, 8), Minimoog (8, 11), orchestration (13)
- David Piltch – additional bass guitar (3), bass guitar (11)
- Ben H. Allen – guitar (4), bass guitar (4)
- Dr. President – keyboards (4), bass guitar (5, 6), organs (5), guitars (5, 12)
- Tomika Walden – background vocals (5)
- Menta Malone – background vocals (5)
- Eddie Reyes – acoustic guitar (8)
- Chris Tedesco – trumpets (10, 12)
- Eric Bobo – drums (11)

Technical

- Ben H. Allen – mixing, engineering
- Kennie Takahashi – mix engineering
- Mike Lazer – mastering
- Mark "Exit" Goodchild – additional engineering (5, 7, 9)

Artwork

- Tom Hingston – art direction
- Kam Tang – illustration
- Alex Kirzhner – design

=== Samples ===
Taken from the St. Elsewhere liner notes:

- "Go-Go Gadget Gospel" contains samples from "Goin' Down to Freedom's Land" written and performed by Nicolas Flagello.
- "Crazy" incorporates elements of "Last Man Standing" written and performed by Gian Franco Reverberi and co-written by Gian Piero Reverberi.
- "St. Elsewhere" incorporates elements of "Geordie" performed by Trees and arranged by Barry Clarke, David Costa, Celia Humphris and Stephen Brown.
- "The Boogie Monster" incorporates elements of "Ku Klux Klan Sequence" written and performed by Armando Trovaioli and Angelo Francesco Lavagnino.
- "Feng Shui" incorporates elements of "Tropicola" written and performed by Nino Nardini.
- "Just a Thought" incorporates elements of "A Touch of Class" written and performed by Kevin Peek.
- "Transformer" incorporates elements of "Rubber Solution" written by Marlene Moore.
- "Who Cares?" incorporates elements of "Mono Ski" written and performed by Keith Mansfield.
- "Online" incorporates elements of "Welcome to the Rain" written by Flip Davis and performed by Mid Day Rain.
- "The Last Time" incorporates elements of "Chicano Chaser" written and performed by Ian Langley.

== Charts ==
=== Weekly charts ===
Chart (2006)	Peak position
Australian Albums (ARIA)	6
Austrian Albums (Ö3 Austria)	2
Belgian Albums (Ultratop Flanders)	4
Belgian Albums (Ultratop Wallonia)	20
Canadian Albums (Billboard)	8
Danish Albums (Hitlisten)	3
Dutch Albums (Album Top 100)	7
Finnish Albums (Suomen virallinen lista)	6
French Albums (SNEP)	4
German Albums (Offizielle Top 100)	6
Irish Albums (IRMA)	4
Italian Albums (FIMI)	10
Japanese Albums (Oricon)	37
New Zealand Albums (RMNZ)	1
Norwegian Albums (VG-lista)	4
Portuguese Albums (AFP)	21
Scottish Albums (Official Charts)	2
Swedish Albums (Sverigetopplistan)	9
Swiss Albums (Schweizer Hitparade)	2
UK Albums (Official Charts)	1
UK R&B Albums (Official Charts)	1
US Billboard 200	4
US Top Dance Albums (Billboard)	1
US Top R&B/Hip-Hop Albums (Billboard)	4

=== Year-end charts ===
Chart (2006)	Position
Australian Albums (ARIA)	58
Austrian Albums (Ö3 Austria)	52
Belgian Albums (Ultratop Flanders)	40
Belgian Albums (Ultratop Wallonia)	96
Dutch Albums (Album Top 100)	54
French Albums (SNEP)	55
German Albums (Offizielle Top 100)	54
Swedish Albums (Sverigetopplistan)	54
Swiss Albums (Schweizer Hitparade)	24
UK Albums (OCC)	31
US Billboard 200	48
US Top Dance/Electronic Albums (Billboard)	2
US Top R&B/Hip-Hop Albums (Billboard)	43

Chart (2007)	Position
US Top Dance/Electronic Albums (Billboard)	1

=== Decade-end charts ===
Chart (2000–09)	Position
US Dance/Electronic Albums (Billboard)	4

== Certifications ==
Region	Certification	Certified units/sales
Australia (ARIA)	Platinum	70,000^{^}
Belgium (BRMA)	Gold	25,000^{*}
Canada (Music Canada)	Platinum	100,000^{^}
Denmark (IFPI Danmark)	Gold	20,000^{^}
France (SNEP)	Gold	100,000^{*}
Germany (BVMI)	Gold	100,000^{^}
Ireland (IRMA)	Platinum	15,000^{^}
New Zealand (RMNZ)	2× Platinum	30,000^{‡}
Switzerland (IFPI Switzerland)	Platinum	30,000^{^}
United Kingdom (BPI)	2× Platinum	600,000^{*}
United States (RIAA)	2× Platinum	2,000,000^{‡}
Summaries
Europe (IFPI)	Platinum	1,000,000^{*}
^{*} Sales figures based on certification alone.^{^} Shipments figures based on certification alone.^{‡} Sales+streaming figures based on certification alone.
