= Who's Gonna Save My Soul =

Single by Gnarls Barkley

from the album The Odd Couple
- B-side: "Mystery Man"
- Released: September 4, 2008
- Recorded: 2008
- Genre: Soul
- Length: 3:17
- Label: Warner Music
- Songwriters: Danger Mouse; Cee-Lo Green
- Producer: Danger Mouse

Gnarls Barkley singles chronology
"Going On" (2008)	"Who's Gonna Save My Soul" (2008)

Audio sample
- file; help

Music video
- "Who's Gonna Save My Soul" on YouTube

"Who's Gonna Save My Soul" is the third and final single taken from soul duo Gnarls Barkley's second studio album, The Odd Couple, released in late 2008. The song's official music video was directed by Chris Milk and was released on July 25, 2008. The video featured work by character animator Keith Sintay and mostly features dialogue from actors Jorma Taccone and Aasha Davis. The single was only released physically in America, in a special limited edition CD + DVD single package.

== Reception ==
The song found popular acclaim: Entertainment Weekly put the video on its "Must List" and Rolling Stone on its "Hot List" in August 2008. On December 3, 2008, the video was nominated for the Grammy Award for Best Short Form Music Video. Sintay won a 2009 D&AD Yellow Pencil Award for Music Video Animation.

Billboard magazine said of the single, "Cee-Lo scorches the vocal hook--"Who's gonna save my soul now?"—and it stops the moderately paced dance cut dead in its tracks." The magazine also said it "might be his finest performance to date." Entertainment Weekly called the song "dolefully paced: and "nearly dirgelike," while People called it "a gritty, gospel-infused plea." Performing Songwriter praised the song as "a stark song with plucked strings and bass so heavy and distant it could be a psychic echo." USA Today said of the single, "Nobody lays bare their broken heart more painfully or more plaintively than Cee-Lo," and named the tune its "Pick of the Week" in late January 2009. It was featured in the closing scene of the final episode of the first season of the AMC original series Breaking Bad and Detroit 1-8-7 in its 17th episode.

== Music video ==
A couple sits at a booth in a diner, while the woman (Aasha Davis) breaks up with her boyfriend (Jorma Taccone). After receiving the plate he requested from the waitress, the man stabs himself in the chest, and pulls out his heart, places it on the plate and gives it to the woman. He explains that his heart "is actually [hers] now," that he will never be able to get over her, and says "from now on every girl that I meet will be meticulously compared to the false memory of what you and I once 'had.'" The woman offers to return it after keeping it temporarily for a "shitty day" or when she needs to move something heavy, but the man insists that he is now "heartless" and thus will passively/aggressively ruin all his future relationships. The heart then comes to life, growing arms, legs and a mouth, and begins to sing the lyrics to the song on the counters of the diner using a piece of broccoli as a microphone before finally stabbing itself with a knife and pulling the man's head out of its body. The head looks around, staring off into space. The scene cuts back to the man staring out the window as the woman speaks. The woman finally asks, "Are you even listening to me?" The man simply replies "No." Cee-Lo and Danger Mouse also made cameos as chefs in the diner.

== Track listing ==
Disc 1 (CD)

1. "Who's Gonna Save My Soul" (Original Mix)
2. "Who's Gonna Save My Soul" (MTV Live 52 Version)
3. "Who's Gonna Save My Soul" (Demo Version)
4. "Mystery Man"
5. "Neighbors" (Live From The 40 Watt)
6. "Who's Gonna Save My Soul" (Instrumental)

Disc 2 (DVD)

1. "Who's Gonna Save My Soul" (Video)
2. "Who's Gonna Save My Soul" (Subtitled Version)
3. "Who's Gonna Save My Soul" (MTV Live 52 Version)
4. "Mystery Man"
5. "A Little Better" (MTV Live 52 Version)
6. "Who's Gonna Save My Soul" (Making Of The Video)
7. "Neighbors" (Live From The 40 Watt)
