= Gnarls Barkley =

American soul duo

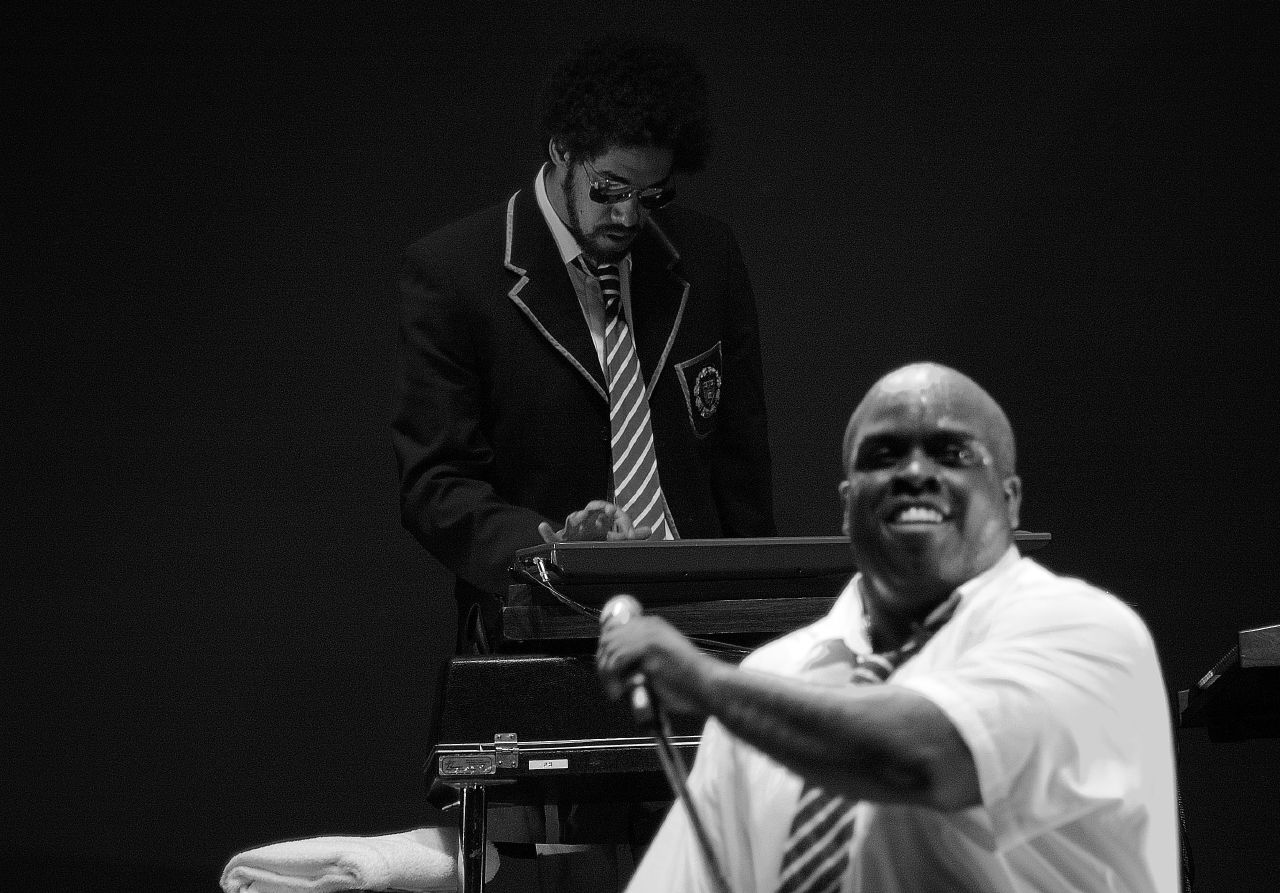
- Gnarls Barkley in 2007

Background information
- Origin: Atlanta, Georgia, U.S.
- Genres: Neo soul; psychedelic soul; alternative rock
- Years active: 2003–2008, 2026
- Labels: Downtown; Atlantic; Warner Bros.; 10K
- Members: Danger Mouse; CeeLo Green

Gnarls Barkley is an American soul duo, composed of singer-songwriter CeeLo Green and producer Danger Mouse. They released their debut studio album, St. Elsewhere, in 2006. It contained their hit single "Crazy", which peaked at number two on the US Hot 100 and topped the UK Singles Chart. It was nominated at the 2007 Grammy Awards for Record of the Year, and was platinum certified for shipping over 1,000,000 records. St. Elsewhere also received a nomination for Album of the Year. Their second studio album, The Odd Couple, was scheduled for release in April 2008, but due to a leak of the album over the internet, they decided to release it early. The album in its entirety received similarly positive reviews. The project was revived in 2026, where the duo released their third and final album Atlanta that March.

== History ==
=== Background ===
CeeLo Green first entered the scene as part of the Atlanta hip hop group Goodie Mob which had a large hand in the Dirty South movement of the 1990s. Green left the group after their third album in 1999 and started his solo career. That year he sang on "Do You Like the Way" along with Lauryn Hill on Santana's multi-platinum Supernatural album.

Brian Joseph Burton, better known by his stage name Danger Mouse, has produced albums for a number of hip hop and rock artists, including Gorillaz' Demon Days, and The Black Keys' Attack & Release, El Camino, and Turn Blue. He received international attention for his mash-up The Grey Album, which blended the a cappella edition of Jay-Z's The Black Album with samples from The Beatles' White Album.

The duo first crossed paths while Green was performing at the University of Georgia and Danger Mouse won a contest to DJ. They became musical partners and worked together on the songs that would become St. Elsewhere; prior to the release of that album they collaborated on the songs "What You Sittin' On?" for Lex Records in 2004, and "Benzi Box" from the Danger Doom album The Mouse and the Mask in 2005.

==== Band name ====
The band was named while Burton was in a cafe in Silver Lake, California, Burton and friends began playing a game of creating fake celebrity names such as Prince Gnarls and Bob Gnarly. When the name Gnarls Barkley was invented, Burton wrote it down. The name was chosen purely for its sound and not because of any basketball fandom by the duo. Despite this, Charles Barkley has said he is honored by the homage.

According to a Billboard article: "Burton and CeeLo have been cagey about what the name of the act means, and each live performance is an opportunity to play dress-up as tennis players, astronauts and chefs, among many other get-ups. The costuming extends to photo shoots, as Burton and Cee Lo would rather impersonate characters from such films as Back to the Future or Wayne's World." They also have dressed up as characters from films A Clockwork Orange and Napoleon Dynamite.

CeeLo Green said in an interview:

That is that electric industrial Euro soul, that's what I call it ... if I can call it anything. It truly is shapeless and formless. My style and my approach is still water, and it runs so deep. So, with that project I got a chance to be a lil' zany, of course a continuation of eccentricity, abstract and vague, and all of those wonderful things that make art exactly what it is. And that's subject to interpretation. As far as the artiste himself, it does cater to and extend the legacy of Cee Lo Green, and showcase the diversity and range and intention of Cee Lo Green. It is a great project that I'm very, very proud of.

=== St. Elsewhere (2006–2007) ===
Downtown/Atlantic in the United States and Warner Bros. Records in the United Kingdom signed the band after several songs, including "Crazy", were played for them by Danger Mouse's management company Waxploitation. "Crazy" was released as their first single on April 3, 2006, preceded by its release as digital download and 12" vinyl record single in March 2006. It gained some of its popularity due to its use on primetime BBC Radio 1 DJ Zane Lowe's television advert, and it was also made Record of the Week by Ken Bruce of BBC Radio 2, Scott Mills and Jo Whiley of BBC Radio 1 as well as being made "Weekend Anthem" by DJ Spoony and Sara Cox (also of Radio 1).

In the United Kingdom, "Crazy" became the first ever single to top the UK Singles Chart purely on download sales as it was released online a week before it was released as a CD single. It was also the first single to top the UK Singles Chart for nine weeks consecutively since 1994 when Wet Wet Wet's "Love Is All Around" was number one for fifteen weeks (the last song to spend exactly nine weeks on top was "Two Tribes" by Frankie Goes to Hollywood in 1984). It has also equaled the Queen 1975 classic "Bohemian Rhapsody", which also topped the UK Singles Chart for nine weeks. Gnarls Barkley announced that as the record had spent its ninth week at number one, it was to be deleted as a vinyl/CD listing from May 28, 2006, so people will "remember the song fondly and not get sick of it". "Crazy" is also the longest number-one on the UK Official Download Chart with its stay lasting eleven consecutive weeks. In late 2009 the song was voted as the best song of the decade by Rolling Stone magazine. It also peaked at number two on the Billboard Hot 100 and topped the charts in the Canada, Ireland, New Zealand, and several other countries.

The group released their debut album, St. Elsewhere, on April 24, 2006, in the United Kingdom and on May 9, 2006, in their native United States. For their American television debut on Late Night with Conan O'Brien, May 24, 2006, the band performed "Crazy".

They performed along with Christina Aguilera, AFI, and Wolfmother at the MTV Movie Awards 2006 on June 8, 2006. They were dressed as characters from the film series Star Wars. Rebel Alliance pilots, Imperial officers, Stormtroopers, Chewbacca, Jango Fett, Obi-Wan, with Cee-Lo singing as an unmasked Darth Vader.

In October 2006, Gnarls Barkley recorded a live session for Live from Abbey Road at Abbey Road Studios.

St. Elsewhere has been certified double platinum by the RIAA for selling over 2,000,000 albums in the United States and the single "Crazy" was certified eight-times platinum. A limited edition deluxe package of St. Elsewhere was released on November 7, 2006. The CD+DVD package includes a 92-page booklet, four music videos and bonus songs from live performance.

St. Elsewhere was nominated for four Grammy Awards in 2007 including for Record of the Year, and Album of the Year, winning two of them for Best Alternate Music Album, and Best Urban/Alternate Performance for "Crazy".

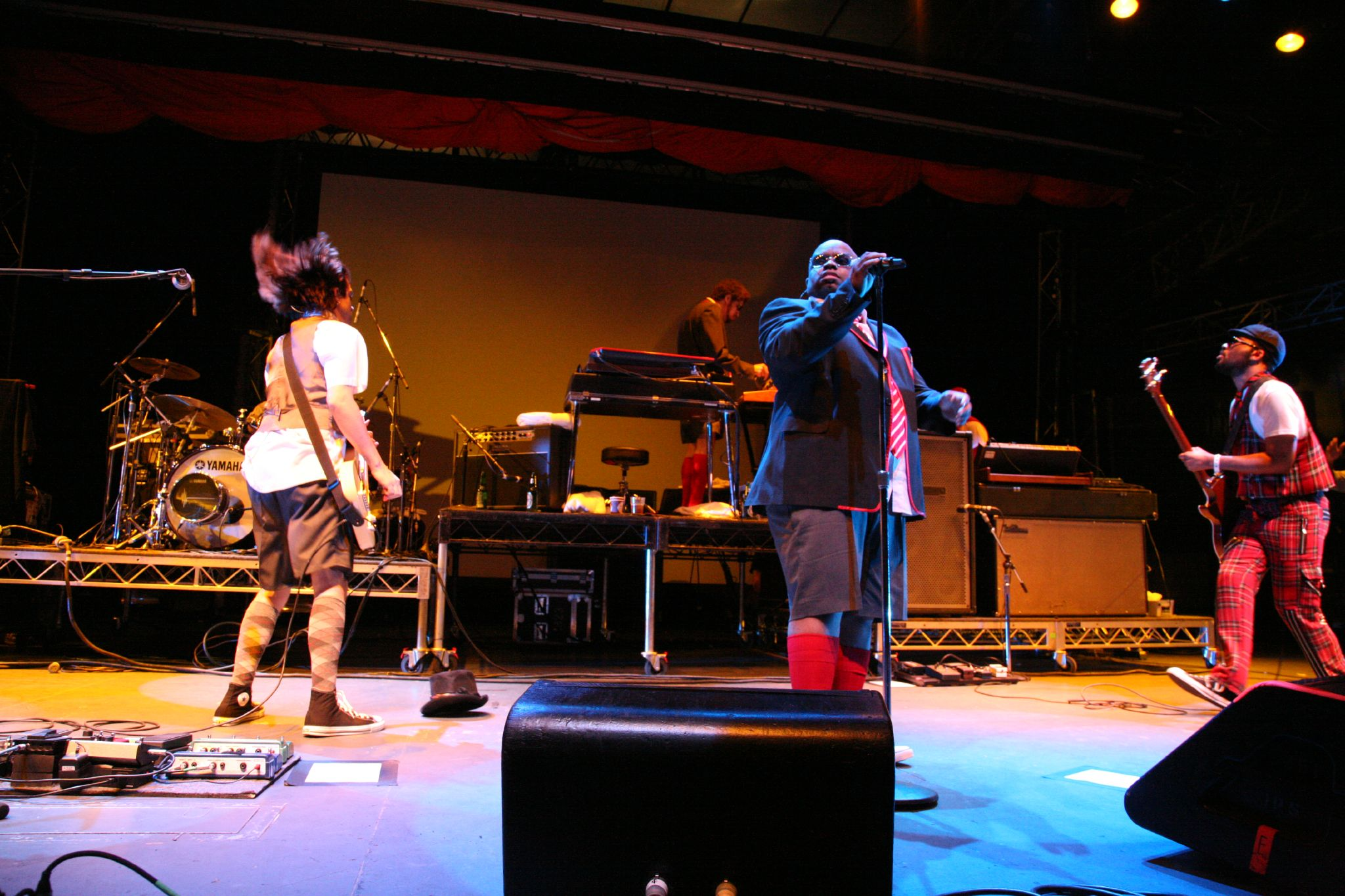
Gnarls Barkley at the Mini V festival in Melbourne, 2007

From January until March 2007, they toured with the Red Hot Chili Peppers through the U.S.

They did a collaborative short film in both the Spring of 2006 and 2007 with the international TV series Kung Faux which airs heavily on Channel V around the world, and they also toured Australia in March and April 2007 as part of the Channel V Festival.

=== The Odd Couple (2008) ===
In early March 2008, the duo's second album, The Odd Couple, was leaked over the internet prompting the duo to push the release date up from April 8. In an interview with Entertainment Magazine, Danger Mouse said that he "knew it [the leak] was coming...every day, I expected to get a call saying it leaked, and eventually I got a call saying it leaked." On March 18, 2008, the album became available via download on the iTunes Store and Amazon MP3. Hard copies of the album were released on March 25.

Prior to its official release, Green spoke to the album's anti-formulaic qualities, noting bluntly that "there's no formula to it," and that to expect the same wild success of St. Elsewhere is to neglect the ever-present "risk factor in any artistic endeavor." He called it something of an "act of faith" – a true, earnest attempt to create and disseminate a piece of art to those who would seek out its conception.

They appeared as the musical guest on the April 12, 2008 episode of NBC's Saturday Night Live. They were supposed to be in a Digital Short parodying amateur music videos according to the scrolled text but only appeared in the singing performances of the live broadcast.

On November 11, 2008, they released an EP, Who's Gonna Save My Soul, featuring four versions of the song which originally appeared on The Odd Couple, along with a live version of "Neighbors" and a previously unreleased song, "Mystery Man." A music video for "Mystery Man" was directed by Walter Robot and premiered on Yahoo! Music.

=== Post-split activity and Atlanta (2008–2026) ===
Gnarls Barkley played their final show to date on September 28, 2008, as part of that year's Austin City Limits. The project then entered hibernation, with both Green and Burton resuming their careers independent of one another. Green returned to his solo career in 2010, releasing the album The Lady Killer and once again achieving commercial success with the hit single "Fuck You!". Burton, meanwhile, formed the band Broken Bells with The Shins' James Mercer and undertook production work for artists such as The Black Keys, Norah Jones and Portugal. The Man.

In 2013, Green stated that Gnarls Barkley would eventually be releasing a third album sometime in the future. In late 2017, Green stated: "We have already started on a new [Gnarls Barkley] album, we're halfway in and we have some overtures from the other projects that may not have stood the test of time, we don't know yet." In July 2020, he revealed that the COVID-19 lockdown happened as he was working on this third effort. On April 20, 2025, Green reassured that new Gnarls Barkley was coming soon through a Facebook post which included a picture of himself and Danger Mouse. On February 25, 2026, the duo officially announced their reunion with a video shared to their YouTube channel and social media pages. The video announced their third album, which was also being billed as their last, titled Atlanta, which was released on March 6, 2026 via 10K Projects/Atlantic. Its lead single, "Pictures", was released the same day as the announcement.

== Discography ==
- St. Elsewhere (2006)
- The Odd Couple (2008)
- Atlanta (2026)

== Awards ==
BET Awards

Year	Nominee / work	Award	Result
2007	"Crazy"	Video of the Year	Nominated
2007	Gnarls Barkley	Best New Artist	Nominated
2007	Gnarls Barkley	Best Group	Won
2008	Gnarls Barkley	Best Group	Nominated

Brit Awards

Year	Nominee / work	Award	Result
2007	St. Elsewhere	International Album	Nominated
2007	Gnarls Barkley	International Breakthrough Act	Nominated
2007	Gnarls Barkley	International Group	Nominated

Grammy Awards

Year	Nominee / work	Award	Result
2007	St. Elsewhere	Album of the Year	Nominated
2007	St. Elsewhere	Best Alternative Music Album	Won
2007	"Crazy"	Record of the Year	Nominated
2007	"Crazy"	Best Urban/Alternative Performance	Won
2008	"Gone Daddy Gone"	Best Music Video	Nominated
2009	"Going On"	Best Pop Performance by a Duo or Group with Vocals	Nominated
2009	"Who's Gonna Save My Soul"	Best Music Video	Nominated
2009	The Odd Couple	Best Alternative Music Album	Nominated

MTV Europe Music Awards

Year	Nominee / work	Award	Result
2006	Gnarls Barkley	Future Sound	Won
2006	"Crazy"	Best Song	Won
2006	"Crazy"	Best Video	Nominated

MTV Video Music Awards

Year	Nominee / work	Award	Result
2006	"Crazy"	Best Group Video	Nominated
2006	"Crazy"	Best Direction	Won
2006	"Crazy"	Best Editing	Won
2007	"Smiley Face"	Best Editing	Won
2008	"Run (I'm a Natural Disaster)"	Best Choreography	Won
2008	"Run (I'm a Natural Disaster)"	Best Art Direction	Won
2009	"Who's Gonna Save My Soul"	Breakthrough Video	Nominated
2009	"Who's Gonna Save My Soul"	Best Visual Effects	Nominated
2009	"Who's Gonna Save My Soul"	Best Art Direction	Nominated

MTVU Woodie Awards

Year	Nominee / work	Award	Result
2006	Gnarls Barkley	Left Field Woodie	Won
2006	"Crazy"	Best Video Woodie - Animated	Nominated
2008	"Who's Gonna Save My Soul"	Best Video Woodie	Nominated

NAACP Image Awards

Year	Nominee / work	Award	Result
2007	Gnarls Barkley	Outstanding Duo or Group	Nominated
2007	"Crazy"	Outstanding Song	Nominated

Q Awards

Year	Nominee / work	Award	Result
2006	"Crazy"	Best Track	Won
2006	"Smiley Face"	Best Video	Nominated

Soul Train Music Awards

Year	Nominee / work	Award	Result
2007	St. Elsewhere	Best R&B/Soul Album – Group, Band or Duo	Nominated
2007	"Crazy"	Best R&B/Soul Single – Group, Band or Duo	Won

Teen Choice Awards

Year	Nominee / work	Award	Result
2006	Gnarls Barkley	Choice Music: Male Breakout Artist	Nominated
2006	"Crazy"	Choice Music: Summer Song	Nominated

- 2009 Rolling Stone 100 Best Songs of the Decade – No. 1 "Crazy"

== See also ==
- Broken Bells
- Gnarls Biggie
