= Good Luck (Broken Bells song) =

2019 single

Single by Broken Bells
- Released: September 27, 2019
- Genre: Indie rock; soul
- Length: 3:26
- Label: AWAL
- Songwriters: Brian Burton; Dave Morris; James Mercer; John Challenger
- Producer: Danger Mouse

Broken Bells singles chronology
"Shelter" (2018)	"Good Luck" (2019)	"We're Not in Orbit Yet..." (2022)

Music video
- "Good Luck" on YouTube

"Good Luck" is a song by the American indie rock duo Broken Bells, released as a non-album single on September 27, 2019, through AWAL. It was the band's first song since the 2018 standalone single "Shelter". James Mercer and Danger Mouse released a joint statement regarding the song, saying they "wanted to release ‘Good Luck’ while it felt timely and reflective of specific discussions between the two of us, questioning the state of things, as we do". The band recorded the track during sessions for their third studio album, Into the Blue, which was released just over 3 years later on October 7, 2022. The track features additional vocals from Portland, Oregon singer-songwriter Alexandra Savior.

== Critical reception ==
"Good Luck" received positive reviews from music critics. Online music magazine BrooklynVegan described the instrumental as "understated" and "psychedelic", and noted that it "could have fit well on the band’s last album". Billboard called the lyrics "moody" and noted that the song's "apocalyptic imagery bears a resemblance to songs like 'Holding On for Life'", a track from the band's 2014 album After the Disco. Australian radio station Double J called the song "[p]retty catchy" and said that "Good Luck" was "the same kind of soulful, cinematic fare they have always done so well." XS Noize said the track "bears ... the instantly recognizable audible fingerprints of both Mercer and Burton melded into something entirely other." Music publication Singersroom listed "Good Luck" as the 2nd best Broken Bells song in their 2023 ranking, calling the track "mesmerizing".

== Charts ==
Chart (2019)	Peak position
US Adult Alternative Airplay (Billboard)	34
