= Leave It Alone (Broken Bells song) =

Promotional single by Broken Bells
- Released: February 4, 2014
- Recorded: 2012–13
- Genre: Alternative rock
- Length: 5:30
- Label: Columbia
- Songwriters: James Mercer; Brian Burton
- Producer: Danger Mouse

Broken Bells singles chronology
| Perfect World (2014) | Leave It Alone (2014) | It's That Talk Again (2015) |

"Leave It Alone" is a song written by James Mercer and Brian Burton of the American alternative rock band Broken Bells. It was originally recorded by the band for their second studio album, After the Disco, where it appears as the fourth track on the album. A "Leave It Alone" promotional single was released for streaming on the Australian branch of commercial music streaming service Spotify on February 4, 2014, becoming the fourth release by the band in promotion of After the Disco, after singles "Holding on for Life", "After the Disco" and promotional single "Perfect World". The song can be found in the soundtrack of the movie Miss You Already starring Toni Collette and Drew Barrymore. The song is a playable track in the music video game Guitar Hero Live.

== Music video ==
No music video for "Leave It Alone" is known to be in production. However, a lyric video, reflecting the art style of the After the Disco short film series and featuring the band's "signature pink aesthetic", was premiered on music video hosting service Vevo on February 4, 2014, the day of After the Disco's release in the United States.

== Track listing ==
Spotify promotional single
| No. | Title | Writer(s) | Producer(s) | Length |
|---|---|---|---|---|
| 1. | "Leave It Alone" | James Mercer; Brian Burton | Burton | 5:31 |

== Personnel ==
Adapted from After the Disco liner notes.

Broken Bells

- Brian Burton – drums, organ, piano, synthesizer, percussion, bass, guitar
- James Mercer – Vocals, guitar, bass, organ, synthesizer, percussion

Vocals

- Elizabeth Berg – backing vocals
- Heather Porcaro – backing vocals
- Myla Balugay – backing vocals
- Rebecca Ann Stark – backing vocals

Technical personnel

- Brian Burton – production, programming
- Kennie Takahashi – programming, mixing, recording, engineering
- Todd Monfalcone – recording
- Jeff Peters – recording [strings]
- Jacob Dennis – assistant mixing, assistant engineering
- Michele Harrison – management
- Chris Kahn – assistant mixing, assistant engineering
- Stephen Marcussen – mastering
- Todd Monfalcone – mixing, second engineer
- Ian Montone – management
- Geoff Neal – assistant mixing
- Amy Schmalz – management
- Laura Sisk – second engineer
- Jeremy Underwood – assistant engineer [strings]

The Angel City String Orchestra

- Daniele Luppi – conductor, string arrangement
- Anton Riehl – score
- Peter Kent – concertmaster, violin
- Chris Tedesco – contractor
- Carolyn Osborn – violin
- Erika Walczak – violin
- Jennifer Walton – violin
- Judy Yoo – violin
- Julie Beavers – violin
- Norman Hughes – violin
- Shari Zippert – violin
- Sharon Jackson – violin
- Susan Chatman – violin
- Vladimir Polimatidi – violin
- Alisha Bauer – cello
- Stefanie Fife – cello
- Vanessa Freebairn-Smith – cello
- Adrianna Zoppo – viola
- Brianna Bandy – viola
- Jessica Van Velzen – viola

== Release history ==
| Country | Date | Format | Label | Catalog no. |
|---|---|---|---|---|
| Australia | February 4, 2014 | Stream | Columbia Records | none |
