= Perfect World (Broken Bells song) =

Promotional single by Broken Bells
- Released: February 4, 2014
- Recorded: 2012–13
- Genre: Alternative rock
- Length: 6:24
- Label: Columbia
- Songwriters: James Mercer, Brian Burton
- Producer: Danger Mouse

Broken Bells singles chronology
| After the Disco (2014) | Perfect World (2014) | Leave It Alone (2014) |

"Perfect World" is a song written by James Mercer and Brian Burton of the American alternative rock band Broken Bells. It was originally recorded by the band for their second studio album, After the Disco, where it appears as the opening track on the album. A "Perfect World" promotional single was released for streaming on the Australian branch of commercial music streaming service Spotify on February 4, 2014, becoming the third release by the band in promotion of After the Disco, after singles "Holding On for Life" and "After the Disco."

== Composition ==
The song was written in the context of After the Disco, where most of the lyrics and music center around a common theme of the party and the morning after, usually in the form of a metaphor for a break-up in a relationship. The song's hook, which had been described by vocalist James Mercer as having a sense of "shamefulness", were the first lyrics written for the song, serving as the inspirational basis for the rest of the song's lyrics. Mercer spoke to National Public Radio, stating:

"That hook came somewhere along the line. ... I remember when it did happen, though, that it felt like, okay, well, there's like a shamelessness to it, with the keyboard sound and the real, over-the-top melody. It was like, 'So what, man?' We grew up listening to things that were big, but they were sad, too. So, it was like, well, we can be big as long as it's as sad as [our music gets]. It's just there. So we didn't really dial it back too much."

== Recording ==
"Perfect World" was first written and recorded well into the recording sessions for After the Disco, borrowing elements from the title track, "After the Disco", a track which they had finished working on by the time "Perfect World" had been conceived. A chord progression for the song was the first written element of the song; instruments and vocals were recorded later on. Two versions of "Perfect World" were originally created by the band; one version presenting the song as a lighter, yet fast-paced melody and one presenting it as a heavier, slower melody. The final version of the track that appears as the opening track on After the Disco features elements of both of the original versions of the track, mixing it into a single track.

== Reception ==
Andy Gill of The Independent wrote, "'Perfect World' effectively re-creat[es] the sound of Factory Records circa 1981: the puttering sequencers and sleek-bleak synth lines recall OMD and early New Order, with Mercer doing a decent impression of Barney Sumner's wan-but-knowing vocal style. Blessed with an infernally catchy hook, it's the best thing they've done."

== Track listing ==
Spotify promotional single
| No. | Title | Writer(s) | Producer(s) | Length |
|---|---|---|---|---|
| 1. | "Perfect World" | James Mercer, Brian Burton | Burton | 6:24 |

== Personnel ==
Adapted from After the Disco liner notes.

Broken Bells

- Brian Burton – drums, organ, piano, synthesizer, percussion, bass, guitar
- James Mercer – vocals, guitar, bass, organ, synthesizer, percussion

Technical personnel

- Brian Burton – producer, programmer
- Kennie Takahashi – programmer, mixing, recording, engineer
- Todd Monfalcone – recording
- Jacob Dennis – assistant mixing, assistant engineer
- Michele Harrison – management
- Chris Kahn – assistant mixing, assistant engineer
- Stephen Marcussen – mastering
- Todd Monfalcone – mixing, second engineer
- Ian Montone – management
- Geoff Neal – assistant mixing
- Amy Schmalz – management
- Laura Sisk – second engineer

== Release history ==
| Country | Date | Format | Label |
|---|---|---|---|
| Australia | February 4, 2014 | Stream | Columbia Records |
