= Meyrin Fields =

EP by Broken Bells
- Released: March 29, 2011
- Genres: Indie rock, alternative rock, space pop
- Length: 11:41
- Label: Columbia
- Producer: Danger Mouse

Broken Bells chronology
Broken Bells (2010)	Meyrin Fields (2011)	After the Disco (2014)

Professional ratings
Aggregate scores
Source	Rating
Metacritic	(65/100)
Review scores
Source	Rating
Alternative Press	2.5/5 stars
Pitchfork Media	(6.7/10)
Rolling Stone	3/5 stars
Under the Radar	7/10 stars

Meyrin Fields is the first EP by the alternative rock band Broken Bells, made up of unreleased tracks from their debut album, Broken Bells. The instrumental version of "An Easy Life" was originally released as the b-side of "The High Road" single, and released with the vocals on the iTunes LP edition of their self-titled album, and "Meyrin Fields" was originally the b-side of "The Ghost Inside." "Heartless Empire" was originally released as an instrumental, with strings replacing the vocals, which could be heard upon opening the music box edition of their 2010 self-titled album.

== Track listing ==
All songs written by James Mercer and Brian "Danger Mouse" Burton.

No.	Title	Length
1.	"Meyrin Fields"	2:48
2.	"Windows"	3:13
3.	"An Easy Life"	2:56
4.	"Heartless Empire"	2:44
