= 12 oz. Mouse =

American adult animated television series

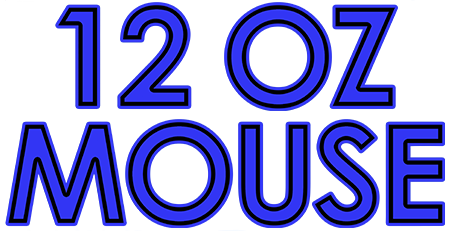
- Genre: Adult animation; Black comedy; Psychological thriller; Surreal humour; Mystery; Action
- Created by: Matt Maiellaro
- Written by: Matt Maiellaro; Matt Harrigan
- Directed by: Matt Maiellaro
- Voices of: Matt Maiellaro; Adam Reed; Kurt Soccolich; Nick Weidenfeld; Matt Harrigan; Vishal Roney; Scott Luallen
- Opening theme: "Main Theme" by Nine Pound Hammer (Season 1–2)
- Ending theme: "12 oz. Mouse" by Amaranthe ("Invictus" – Season 3)
- Country of origin: United States
- No. of seasons: 3
- No. of episodes: 31 (and 2 specials and 1 webisode) (list of episodes)

Production
- Executive producers: Keith Crofford; Mike Lazzo
- Producers: Matt Maiellaro; John Brestan
- Running time: 11–12 minutes
- Production company: Williams Street

Original release
- Network: Teletoon Detour; Adult Swim; Adult Swim Video (webisode)
- Release: June 20, 2005 – December 17, 2006
- Release: July 20 – July 31, 2020

12 oz. Mouse is an American adult animated television series about an alcoholic cartoon mouse. The show was created by Matt Maiellaro for Cartoon Network's late-night programming block Adult Swim.

The series revolves around Mouse Fitzgerald, nicknamed "Fitz" (voiced by Maiellaro), an alcoholic mouse who performs odd jobs so he can buy more beer. Together with his chinchilla companion Skillet, Fitz begins to recover suppressed memories that he once had a wife and a child who have now vanished. This leads him to seek answers about his past and the shadowy forces that seem to be manipulating his world.

In producing the series, Maiellaro crudely designed the characters as a cost-cutting measure; the series was originally animated by Radical Axis. He intended for the series to lack continuity starting from the pilot but established a serial format after starting the second episode. He had constructed an ending for the series as well as a detailed map of characters; however, the series finale concluded differently from planned. Maiellaro cast people around his office for the characters, starring himself as the protagonist and Nine Pound Hammer vocalist Scott Luallen as the voice of Roostre; the band also performs the opening theme.

The pilot episode for 12 oz. Mouse, "Hired", premiered on June 19, 2005. The series became a regular staple of Adult Swim's lineup on October 23 of that year and originally ended on December 17, 2006. A stand-alone webisode was released online on May 16, 2007. The series received positive reviews from critics, with praise for its deceptively complex story and humor. However, the show also grew criticism for its art style and slow pace.

In 2018, a double-length special, entitled "Invictus", aired on October 14 and it was announced that 12 oz. Mouse was also revived as a series. The third season, consisting of 11 episodes, premiered on July 20, 2020, and ended on July 31. The ending credits of both "Invictus" and the season 3 episodes feature a song by Amaranthe and animation by Awesome Inc. In February 2021, it was revealed that the show would not be picked up for a fourth season.

== Premise ==
The series' main characters, Skillet (left) and Mouse Fitzgerald (right)

The show revolves around a mouse named Mouse Fitzgerald (voiced by Matt Maiellaro), nicknamed "Fitz", who is fond of beer and caught in a world of espionage, love, and the delights of odd jobs. The show employs a serial format, and its ongoing storyline developed from absurdist comedy to include mystery and thriller elements. Fitz begins to recover suppressed memories that he once had a wife and a child who have now vanished. This leads him to seek answers about his past and the shadowy forces that seem to be manipulating his world.

Fitz suspects there is a sinister conspiracy involving fields of "asprind" pills beneath the city, and Shark (Adam Reed), Clock, and Rectangular Businessman's (Kurt Soccolich) attempt to control the nature of time and reality. Fitz and Skillet receive help from Liquor (Matt Harrigan), Roostre (Scott Luallen), Peanut Cop (Nick Weidenfeld) and others as they engage in gun battles, blow things up, and try to understand cryptic hints. The show also sometimes contains surreal "subliminal" images that flash across the screen during key plot moments, including skulls, mustached snake beasts and people screaming.

The series concludes with the revelation that Fitz has been kidnapped and placed into a simulation by the Shadowy Figure. He is about to be killed by Shark and the Rectangular Businessman, in their true forms outside the simulation, when he is rescued by the true form of Peanut Cop and a nurse who works in the simulation chamber. They kill Shark and Rectangle Businessman, but it is unknown if they are truly dead because the simulation in which most of the show takes place is probably taking place in another simulation. One of the purposes of the simulation seen in most of the show was to extract information from Fitz. The conclusion to episode 20 is ambiguous as to whether or not it is actually the end of the series, as some aspects of the plot remain unresolved – Golden Joe says "I thought this was done," to which Fitz replies, "I thought so too. I guess we're not."

One webisode was made in 2007, showing Fitz and his friends escaping the city to live in a desert. Golden Joe is carried away by birds, while later one night, Peanut Cop mysteriously disappears. Fitz and Skillet later meet a woman, Lee, who turns out to be a werewolf. Their fate at the end of the episode was unknown.

In 2018, a half-hour special episode aired, which continued the story. Fitz, now with a mustache and suffering from amnesia, is shown to be living in a new city during an unspecified amount of time after the original finale. Shark and Square Guy have returned somehow, and are trying to kidnap Fitz so they can return to the "real" world with the help of exterminator bee, Buzby (Dana Snyder). Skillet, Roostre, Peanut Cop, Golden Joe, and The New Guy (Mike Lazzo) must find and escape the simulation with Fitz before Shark and Square Guy do.

== Characters ==
=== Main ===
- Mouse "Fitz" Fitzgerald (voiced by Matt Maiellaro) is an alcoholic green mouse who suffers from amnesia.
- Shark (voiced by Adam Reed) is a blue shark who is the president of Cardboard City and Fitz's former employer.
- Skillet was Fitz's best friend and sidekick.
- Rectangular Businessman (voiced by Kurt Soccolich) was a businessman who owns a bank.

== Development ==
=== Production ===
According to Maiellaro, the series was pitched as a table read to the network. He jokingly stated that they accepted it after claiming that production costs would total "five dollars and will take some of the paper sitting in the copier." Maiellaro borrowed inspiration from surrealism and the films of David Lynch. He intended for the series to lack continuity starting from the pilot, but established a serial format after starting to work on the second episode. He had constructed an ending for the series as well as a detailed map of characters; however, the series finale concluded differently from planned. In November 2006, Maiellaro mentioned the possibility of continuing the series with webisodes, and he wrote five additional scripts for ending the series, but finally, he only produced one webisode, entitled "Enter the Sandmouse".

Radical Axis provided animation for the series using Final Cut Pro. Described as "lo-fi animation", Maiellaro crudely designed the characters as a cost-cutting measure, with the exception of Amalockh, a many-armed monster summoned in the season two episode "Corndog Chronicles", which was drawn and animated by Todd Redner at the studio, and Shark, whose model was borrowed from Hanna-Barbera's Sealab 2020 episode "The Shark Lover" and used in the Space Ghost Coast to Coast episode "Kentucky Nightmare". In a behind-the-scenes clip of the show, Maiellaro explained that to animate the series, he would first grab a nearby sheet of copy paper, draw something, and then scan it, followed by him sending the file to an animator. Rhoda, a character from the series, was drawn on the back of a script page for Perfect Hair Forever. A scan of the paper revealed the textual contents behind it, which Maiellaro decided to leave in.

=== Cast ===
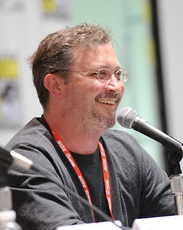
Series creator Matt Maiellaro (pictured in 2010), who also provided the voice of Mouse.

Maiellaro cast people around his office to voice the characters. He provides the voice of Mouse Fitzgerald. He originally only gave the scratch dialogue for the character during the production of the pilot episode but chose himself to voice Mouse regularly after hearing his lines assembled in the final cut. Kurt Soccolich was chosen by Maiellaro to voice Rectangular Businessman, who "already had that sort of smooth arrogance in his voice", making him a "perfect" fit for him. Matt Harrigan was selected to voice Liquor, who is "always looking to make light of a situation", according to Maiellaro.

Nick Weidenfeld provides the voice of Peanut Cop; Melissa Warrenburg portrays an annoying woman in a green sweater, who Maiellaro dubs "Robogirl". Bonnie Rosmarin voices Man/Woman, picked for what Maiellaro stated is a "pouty, stand-offish quality" in her delivery. Nick Ingkatanuwat voices The Eye and Adam Reed plays Shark. Vocalist of Nine Pound Hammer Scott Luallen voices Roostre; the band also composed the opening theme song for the series. Golden Joe is voiced by Vishal Roney; after hearing his first take on the character, Maiellaro explained that he was left unable to write any of his lines. He proceeded to only provide the basic structure of his lines in the script, instructing him to retroscript the rest.

=== Title sequence and music ===
Maiellaro spent three weeks working with Ingkatanuwat on putting together the set for the opening title sequence. The set was filmed with a motion control camera and was inserted with miniature explosives and smoke bombs for special effect. Nine Pound Hammer composed the opening theme song; Maiellaro sought a song representing the "carefree" lifestyle of Mouse who "does things like drive drunk, film porno and shoot guns." Maiellaro, who plays the electric guitar in his free time, also composed the song "F-Off", featured in both the first episode and in "Auraphull", which he wrote while working on Space Ghost Coast to Coast. Swedish heavy metal band Amaranthe performed the credits theme song for the 2018 special, "Invictus".

=== Revival ===
The June 14, 2018, episode of the Adult Swim streaming series Development Meeting featured a new clip from 12 oz. Mouse, which featured Seth Green as Fitz, hinting at a return to the series. It was later announced on September 18 of that year that the series would return for a half-hour special entitled "Invictus", which aired a month later on October 14. On the day of the special's airing, another announcement was made that the series would return for an 11-episode third season which aired in late July 2020. On March 31, 2020, the third-season premiere aired unannounced at 2:45 am EST with many other new episodes from Adult Swim shows as part of Adult Swim's annual April Fools Prank. The whole third season premiered on July 20, 2020, and ended on July 31. In February 2021, Maiellaro confirmed that the series was not picked up for a fourth season, citing management changes at Adult Swim.

== Episodes ==
Series overview
Season	Episodes	Originally released	
Season	Episodes	First released	Last released
1	7	June 19, 2005	January 1, 2006
"Spider-Man Special"		November 6, 2005	
2	13	September 25, 2006	December 18, 2006
Webisode		May 16, 2007	
"Invictus"		October 12, 2018	
3	11	July 20, 2020	July 31, 2020

The pilot episode for 12 oz. Mouse, "Hired", premiered in June 2005 and became a regular series in the Adult Swim lineup in October 2005. An Adult Swim bumper shown with the sixth installment claimed that twenty additional episodes were being produced and taunted viewers who had complained they couldn't understand the absurdist presentation. On December 31, 2005, a marathon of the series aired, replaying all six episodes followed by the premiere of the then-unfinished seventh episode "Adventure Mouse". The second season aired on Adult Swim on Monday mornings at 12:45 a.m. EST from September 24, 2006, to December 17, 2006. On May 16, 2007, the 21st episode, entitled "Enter the Sandmouse", premiered as a webisode. On October 14, 2018, a half-hour special titled "Invictus" premiered on TV after having been released online two days earlier. Simultaneously, Adult Swim announced the series would be returning for a third season. The third season premiered unexpectedly on March 31, 2020, as part of that year's Adult Swim's April Fools Prank.

== International broadcast ==
In Canada, 12 oz. Mouse previously aired on Teletoon's Teletoon at Night block, and formerly aired on the Canadian version of Adult Swim. The INVICTUS special aired on E4 on August 28, 2020.

== Reception ==
=== Ratings ===
The season two episodes "Auraphull" and "Meat Warrior" were respectively seen by 460,000 and 431,000 viewers upon broadcast. In addition, the episodes ranked as the thirteenth and twelfth most-watched episodes aired by the network for the week of October 23, 2006, also respectively.

=== Critical reception ===
The series has received generally positive critical reception; About.com's Nancy Basile gave the series four out of five stars, opining that the series is "what Adult Swim should be ... experimental, but in a cheap, simple, not-trying-to-be-cool way." She found the crude animation "refreshing" but joked that the series "can kill" viewers not used to the slow pace. Writing for AOL TV, Adam Finley regarded the show as "the most simplistically drawn of all the Adult Swim shows, and yet the most complex in terms of story." He contrasted it with other Williams Street productions, finding it "instead unravels slowly, revealing a little bit more of what's underneath the surface while also piling on more and more questions." Rob Mitchum of Pitchfork Media called it "the asymptote of the block's crude style".

Justin Heckert of Atlanta magazine opined that "the animation and art look like they were done by daycare students".

== Other appearances ==
The hip hop duo Danger Doom have produced a song inspired by 12 oz. Mouse entitled "Korn Dogz" from their EP Occult Hymn. The song uses audio clips from the episode "Rooster", with the line "Corn dogs for the pickin'" being recited by Danger Doom's MC MF Doom and Mouse Fitzgerald. A scene from the episode "Sharktasm" is visible in Aqua Teen Hunger Force Colon Movie Film for Theaters.

== Home media ==
A DVD release of the first 2 seasons was released on February 29, 2008 by Warner Home Video, exclusively on the Williams Street shop. The DVD cover depicts Leonardo's The Last Supper with the series' characters replacing Christ and the twelve apostles. However, under a black light, the cover depicts the skeletons of the characters, as well as letters and symbols which make out an email address. The series is presented as a single, continuous movie, with newly produced footage bridging the gaps between episodes. It also features production footage, new music, the episode "Auraphull" in its entirety, and collected fan art.
