= After the Disco (song) =

Single by Broken Bells

from the album After the Disco
- Released: January 7, 2014
- Recorded: 2012–13
- Genre: Alternative rock
- Length: 3:39
- Label: Columbia
- Songwriters: James Mercer, Brian Burton
- Producer: Danger Mouse

Broken Bells singles chronology
"Holding On for Life" (2013)	"After the Disco" (2014)	"Perfect World" (2014)

"After the Disco" is a song by American alternative rock band Broken Bells. Written by band members James Mercer and Brian Burton and produced by the latter, it was originally recorded by the band for their second studio album, After the Disco, where it appears as the second track. It was released as the second single from After the Disco in the United Kingdom on January 7, 2014. This song is included in Pro Evolution Soccer 2016 as part of its soundtrack.

== Track listing ==
Digital download
No.	Title	Writer(s)	Producer(s)	Length
1.	"After the Disco"	James Mercer, Brian Burton	Burton	3:39

== Personnel ==
Adapted from After the Disco liner notes.

Broken Bells

- Brian Burton – drums, organ, piano, synthesizer, percussion, bass, guitar
- James Mercer – vocals, guitar, bass, organ, synthesizer, percussion

Technical personnel

- Brian Burton – producer, programmer
- Kennie Takahashi – programmer, mixing, recording, engineer
- Todd Monfalcone – recording
- Jacob Dennis – assistant mixing, assistant engineer
- Michele Harrison – management
- Chris Kahn – assistant mixing, assistant engineer
- Stephen Marcussen – mastering
- Todd Monfalcone – mixing, second engineer
- Ian Montone – management
- Geoff Neal – assistant mixing
- Amy Schmalz – management
- Laura Sisk – second engineer

== Charts ==
Chart (2014)	Peak position
Belgium (Ultratip Bubbling Under Flanders)	85
US Hot Rock & Alternative Songs (Billboard)	34

== Release history ==
Country	Date	Format	Label
United Kingdom	January 7, 2014	Digital download	Columbia Records
United States	August 19, 2014	Modern rock radio	Columbia Records
