= Leave It Alone =

Leave It Alone may refer to:

- "Leave It Alone" (Broken Bells song), 2014
- "Leave It Alone" (The Forester Sisters song), 1989
- "Leave It Alone" (Hayley Williams song), 2020
- "Leave It Alone" (Living Colour song), 1993
- "Leave It Alone" (Moist song), 1996
- "Leave It Alone" (Operator Please song), 2007
- "Leave It Alone", a song by Disturbed from Asylum, 2010
- "Leave It Alone", a song by NOFX from Punk in Drublic, 1994
