= Broken Bells =

American rock band

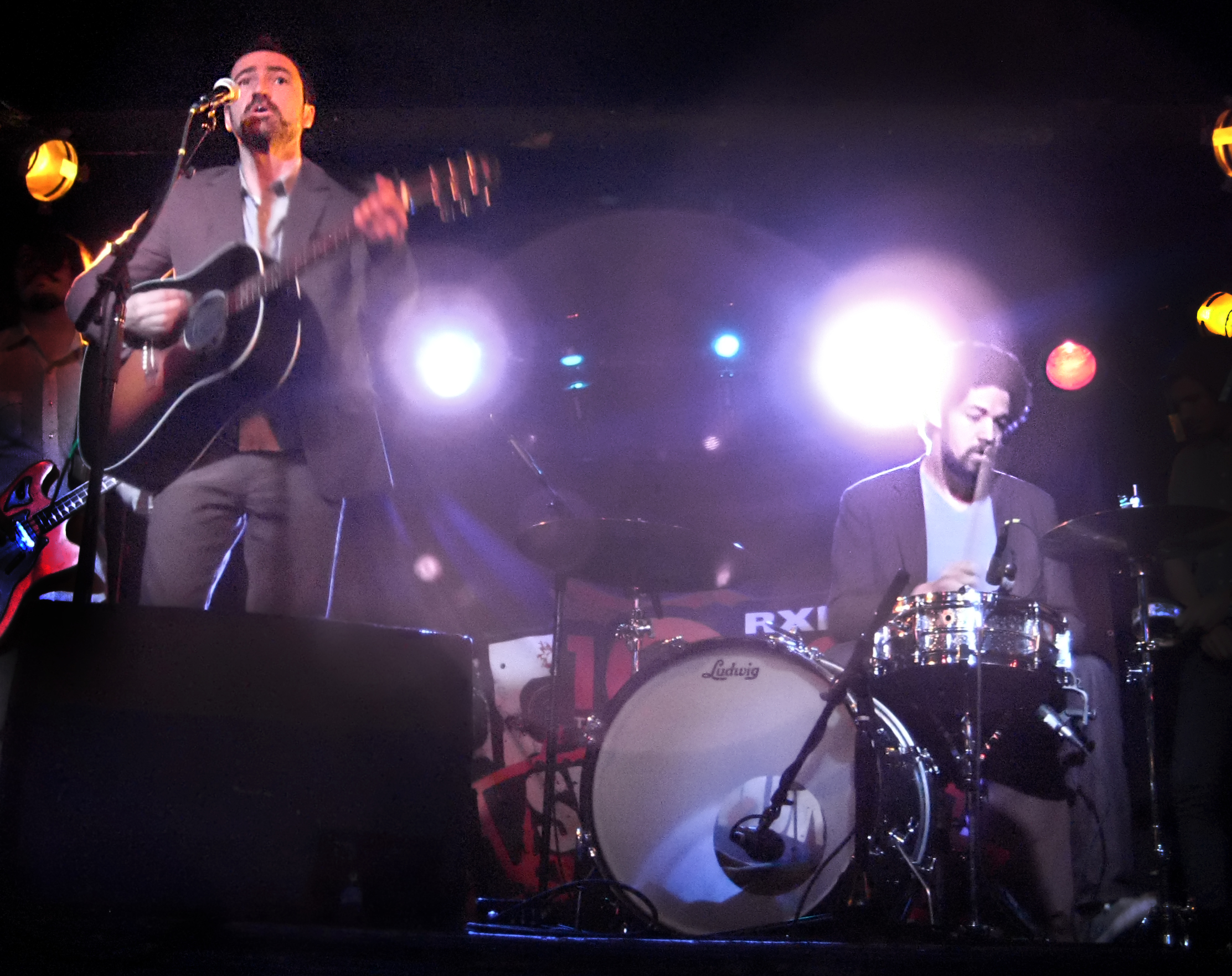
- Broken Bells performing in 2010

Background information
- Origin: Los Angeles, California, U.S.
- Genres: Indie rock; alternative rock; space rock
- Years active: 2004–present
- Label: Columbia
- Members: James Mercer; Brian Burton
- Website: brokenbells.com

Broken Bells is an American indie rock band composed of artist-producer Brian Burton (better known as Danger Mouse) and James Mercer, the lead vocalist and guitarist for the indie rock band The Shins. Broken Bells compose and create as a duo, but are joined by Dan Elkan and Jon Sortland when performing live. The previous live band included Conor Oberst and the Mystic Valley Band sidemen Nate Walcott and Nik Freitas, and Jonathan Hischke and Dan Elkan, both ex-members of Hella. Following their 2010 self-titled debut album, the duo released an EP, Meyrin Fields, in 2011 and their second studio album, After the Disco, in 2014. In 2022 they released a third studio album, Into the Blue.

== History ==
Brian Burton and James Mercer decided to work together after meeting at the Roskilde Festival in 2004 and finding they were fans of each other's work. By March 2008, Mercer and Burton began recording together in secret at Burton's Los Angeles–based studio. The project was first announced on September 29, 2009. Burton and Mercer described their material as "melodic, but experimental, too".

Prior to the formation of Broken Bells, Mercer and Burton worked together on the track "Insane Lullaby" on the album Dark Night of the Soul by Danger Mouse and Sparklehorse. Broken Bells have since performed the song several times, often as a tribute to the late Mark Linkous, the Sparklehorse frontman who died in early 2010.

Broken Bells' self-titled debut album was released in the United States and Canada on March 9, 2010 through Columbia Records, and has sold over 400,000 copies domestically, peaking at number 7 on the Billboard 200 chart. The album received positive reviews. Rolling Stone magazine gave it a four-star review and stated that it was "the year’s coolest left field pop disc." In addition to having one of the year’s highest-charting debut albums, the band sold out shows on their first-ever tour.

Broken Bells released an EP titled Meyrin Fields on March 18, 2011.

On February 14, 2012, in an interview with KINK.FM (a Portland, Oregon radio station), Mercer stated that he was currently working on Broken Bells' second album. On October 8, 2013, the band announced the release of its second album, After the Disco. Broken Bells released their lead single from the album, titled "Holding on for Life", on November 4, 2013. After the Disco was released on February 4, 2014. That same day the band covered "And I Love Her" alongside footage of Ringo Starr on an old television as part of the Late Show With David Letterman's "Beatles Week" to celebrate the 50th anniversary of the Beatles' debut appearance on The Ed Sullivan Show. The band performed "Holding on for Life" on the March 7, 2014 episode of The Tonight Show Starring Jimmy Fallon. On December 7, 2018, Broken Bells released "Shelter", their first single in three years. A follow-up single, "Good Luck", was issued on September 27, 2019.

"We're Not in Orbit Yet...", the first single from Broken Bells' third album, Into the Blue, was released on June 29, 2022 after an eight-year hiatus. The band released another single, "Saturdays", on August 10, 2022. On September 21, the band released "Love on the Run", the third single from the album.

== Members ==
Official members

- James Mercer (also of The Shins) – lead vocals, guitars, bass, keyboards
- Brian Burton (a.k.a. Danger Mouse) – keyboards, bass, drums, production

Touring members

- Dan Elkan – guitar, bass, keyboards, vocals
- Jon Sortland – drums, keyboards, bass, vocals

== Discography ==
=== Studio albums ===
Title	Album details	Peak chart positions										Certifications
Title	Album details	US	AUS	BEL (FL)	CAN	DEN	FRA	GER	SCO	SWI	UK	Certifications
Broken Bells	Released: March 9, 2010; Label: Columbia	7	20	72	16	14	88	67	60	17	47	RIAA: Gold; MC: Gold
After the Disco	Released: February 4, 2014; Label: Columbia	5	14	29	3	22	74	28	17	10	12	
Into the Blue	Released: October 7, 2022; Label: AWAL	— (Note: "Into the Blue" did not enter the Billboard 200 chart, but peaked at number 15 on the Album Sales chart.)	— (Note: Into the Blue did not enter the ARIA Albums Chart, but peaked at number 43 on the ARIA Digital Album Chart.)	—	—	—	—	—	66	51	— (Note: Into the Blue did not enter the UK Albums Chart, but peaked at number 22 on the UK Album Downloads Chart.)	
"—" denotes releases that did not chart or were not released in that country.

=== Extended plays ===
Title	EP details	Peak chart positions			
Title	EP details	US	US Alt.	US Rock	UK Sales
Meyrin Fields	Released: March 29, 2011; Label: Columbia	62	12	17	68

=== Singles ===
Title	Year	Peak chart positions										Certifications	Album
Title	Year	US Sales	US Rock	BEL (FL)	BEL (WA)	CAN	FRA	JPN Hot	MEX Eng. Air.	SWI	UK	Certifications	Album
"The High Road"	2009	12	15	—	—	75	—	60	11	50	— (Note: "The High Road" did not enter the UK Singles Chart, but peaked at number 61 on the UK Physical Singles Chart.)	RIAA: Platinum; MC: Gold	Broken Bells
"The Ghost Inside"	2010	23	42	—	—	—	—	—	26	—	— (Note: "The Ghost Inside" did not enter the UK Singles Chart, but peaked at number 38 on the UK Physical Singles Chart Top 100.)	RIAA: Gold	Broken Bells
"Meyrin Fields"	2011	25	—	—	—	—	—	—	—	—	— (Note: "Meyrin Fields" did not enter the UK Singles Chart, but peaked at number 68 on the UK Physical Singles Chart Top 100.)		Meyrin Fields
"Holding On for Life"	2013	9	22	53	80	—	—	—	38	88	173		After the Disco
"After the Disco"	2014	—	34	135	—	—	—	—	42	—	—		After the Disco
"Control"	2014	22	—	—	—	—	74	—	47	—	—		After the Disco
"It's That Talk Again"	2015	—	—	—	—	—	—	—	—	—	—		Non-album singles
"Shelter"	2018	—	— (Note: "Shelter" did not enter the Hot Rock & Alternative Songs chart, but peaked at number 16 on the Adult Alternative Airplay chart.)	— (Note: "Shelter" did not enter the Flanders Ultratop 50, but charted as an extra tip on the Flemish Ultratip chart.)	— (Note: "Shelter" did not enter the Wallonie Ultratop 50, but charted as an extra tip on the Wallonie Ultratip chart.)	—	—	—	—	—	—		Non-album singles
"Good Luck"	2019	—	— (Note: "Good Luck" did not enter the Hot Rock & Alternative Songs chart, but peaked at number 34 on the Adult Alternative Airplay chart.)	—	—	—	—	—	—	—	—		Non-album singles
"We're Not in Orbit Yet..."	2022	—	—	—	—	—	—	—	—	—	—		Into the Blue
"Saturdays"	2022	—	— (Note: "Saturdays" did not enter the Hot Rock & Alternative Songs chart, but peaked at number 49 on the Rock & Alternative Airplay chart.)	—	—	—	—	—	—	—	—		Into the Blue
"Love on the Run"	2022	—	—	—	—	—	—	—	—	—	—		Into the Blue
"—" denotes a release that did not chart.

==== Promotional singles ====
Title	Year	Peak chart positions		Album
Title	Year	US Rock DL	CAN	Album
"October" (radio)	2010	24	99	Broken Bells
"Vaporize" (radio)	2011	—	—	Broken Bells
"Perfect World" (stream)	2014	—	—	After the Disco
"Leave It Alone" (stream)	2014	—	—	After the Disco
"—" denotes a release that did not chart.

== Awards and nominations ==
Broken Bells were nominated at the 2011 Grammy Awards for Best Alternative Music Album.
