= The Mouse and the Mask =

Studio album by Danger Doom
- Released: 10 October 2005; 11 October 2005 (United States)
- Recorded: 2003–2005
- Genre: Underground hip-hop
- Length: 39:51
- Labels: Lex; Epitaph; Metalface
- Producer: Danger Mouse

Danger Doom chronology
| The Mouse and the Mask (2005) | Occult Hymn (2006) |

MF Doom chronology
| Mm..Food (2004) | The Mouse and the Mask (2005) | Occult Hymn (2006) |

Danger Mouse chronology
| The Grey Album (2004) | The Mouse and the Mask (2005) | Occult Hymn (2006) |

Alternative cover
- European cover

Singles from The Mouse and the Mask
- 1. "Sofa King" Released: 25 October 2005; 2. "Old School" Released: 10 July 2006 (UK only)

The Mouse and the Mask (stylized as THE MOUSE & THE MASK) is the only studio album by Danger Doom, a collaboration between the hip-hop artists Danger Mouse and MF Doom. It was released in Europe on 10 October 2005, and on 11 October 2005 by the independent punk label Epitaph Records in the United States. It was also released by Lex Records in the UK on 17 October 2005, with different cover art. The album was made in collaboration with Adult Swim, and features multiple characters and samples from the channel's respective shows.

== Concept ==
The album is composed almost entirely of raps by MF Doom, performed over beats created by Danger Mouse sampling music from various television shows airing on Cartoon Network's programming block Adult Swim. The whole cast of the Adult Swim show Aqua Teen Hunger Force all make appearances on The Mouse and the Mask. References to other Adult Swim shows are found in the song "El Chupa Nibre", in which the voices of Brak (from Space Ghost Coast to Coast and The Brak Show) and Lois Griffin (from Family Guy) are heard. Both the song's title and its lines "Chew an MC like El Chupa Nibre/Digest a group and sell the poop on eBay" reference the show Futurama.

Two songs, "Perfect Hair" and "A.T.H.F.", are direct references on the shows from which they derive their names, Perfect Hair Forever and Aqua Teen Hunger Force. The song "Basket Case" also has Harvey Birdman, Mentok the Mind Taker, and other characters in the show Harvey Birdman Attorney at Law, another show on Adult Swim. The song "Sofa King" is also an Aqua Teen Hunger Force reference. It features the Aqua Teen Hunger Force cast and BillyWitchDoctor.com from the episode "Video Ouija."

MF Doom disses MF Grimm in this album by referring to the Monsta Island Czars (aka M.I.C.) as 'Midgets Into Crunk' in the song "El Chupa Nibre" (on the paraphrased remix version the line is changed to 'Monkeys Into Crime'). Grimm responded by releasing an entire Doom diss track, titled "Book of Daniel" (which concludes his 2006 triple album American Hunger), in which he mainly accuses Doom of having sold out.

The rap that Meatwad performs at the end of "Bada Bing" is a verse from "Beef Rapp", the first song on MF Doom's album Mm..Food.

== Promotion ==
The album was heavily promoted by the network prior to its release. "Sofa King" was released as a 12-inch single on 4 November 2005, and was followed by "Old School" on 10 July 2006. An animated video for "A.T.H.F." was also made.

== Reception ==
Professional ratings
Aggregate scores
| Source | Rating |
|---|---|
| Metacritic | 81/100 |
Review scores
| Source | Rating |
| AllMusic | 4.5/5 stars |
| The Austin Chronicle | 4/5 stars |
| Entertainment Weekly | A− |
| The Guardian | 3/5 stars |
| Los Angeles Times | 3/4 stars |
| Pitchfork | 7.8/10 |
| Rolling Stone | 3/5 stars |
| Spin | B |
| Uncut | 4/5 stars |
| The Village Voice | A− |

The Mouse and the Mask was met with overwhelmingly favorable reviews from critics, scoring 81 out of 100 on the review aggregator Metacritic, indicating "universal acclaim". Spin ranked it 25 on their "40 Best Albums Of 2005", and said that "together, these two dudes are more animated than the cartoon characters who pop up on this disc.". Entertainment Weekly gave it an A−, calling it a "hip-hop tour-de-farce". Magnet said "wading deep into hip hop's rich history, they deliver a record that conjures the classics without sounding willfully retro". The Wire called it "[a] frenetic comedy both above and of a kind with its fratboy origins, admirably absurdist in some respects and coolly demented in others" and Vibe similarly said "[a] headphone-friendly soundtrack...[of] deliciously demented narratives." Mojo gave it 3 out of 5 stars, noting "the stoned, late-night hilarity is grounded by some deft soundtrack-funk production from Dangermouse..."

Danger Doom was awarded Hip-Hop Album of the Year by PLUG Independent Music Awards for their album The Mouse and the Mask. As of 6 November 2008 the album has sold 170,081 copies.

== In popular culture ==
Comedian Dave Chappelle created an iTunes Celebrity Playlist and selected the Danger Doom track "Mince Meat" for his Block Party Picks. He stated, "Two very consistently good artists collaborate to make my head nod. DOOM, Mouse - Thank You. Wherever you are, nice album." MF Doom mentions Chappelle in the song "Peoples, Places, and Things" (called "Name Dropping" on his CD "Live from Planet X"). Doom says "Rap cats act brave as hell/Get on the mic and turn 'Gangsta!' on some 'yeah, see' like Dave Chappelle", in reference to a bit Chappelle performed in his stand up "Killin' Them Softly".

== Track listing ==
All songs produced by Danger Mouse.

All tracks are written by Daniel Dumile and Brian Burton, with additional writers noted.

| No. | Title | Writer(s) | Performer(s) | Length |
|---|---|---|---|---|
| 1. | "El Chupa Nibre" | | MF Doom; Master Shake | 2:40 |
| 2. | "Sofa King" | | MF Doom; Aqua Teen Hunger Force | 2:57 |
| 3. | "The Mask" | Dennis Coles | MF Doom; Ghostface Killah; Brak and Zorak | 3:12 |
| 4. | "Perfect Hair" | | MF Doom; Master Shake | 2:03 |
| 5. | "Benzi Box" | Thomas DeCarlo Callaway | MF Doom; Cee Lo Green | 3:00 |
| 6. | "Old School" | Talib Kweli Greene | MF Doom; Talib Kweli; Aqua Teen Hunger Force | 2:40 |
| 7. | "A.T.H.F." | | MF Doom; Aqua Teen Hunger Force | 3:03 |
| 8. | "Basket Case" | | MF Doom; the cast of Harvey Birdman, Attorney at Law | 2:35 |
| 9. | "No Names" | | MF Doom; the cast of Sealab 2021 | 3:07 |
| 10. | "Crosshairs" | | MF Doom; Brak; Thundercleese | 2:27 |
| 11. | "Mince Meat" | | MF Doom | 2:33 |
| 12. | "Vats of Urine" | | MF Doom; Mooninites | 1:48 |
| 13. | "Space Ho's" | | MF Doom; Space Ghost | 3:29 |
| 14. | "Bada Bing" | | MF Doom; Aqua Teen Hunger Force | 4:35 |

== Release details ==
| Country | Date | Label | Format | Catalog |
|---|---|---|---|---|
| United States | 11 October 2005 | Epitaph Records | CD | 86775 |
| United States | 11 October 2005 | Epitaph Records | LP | 86775 |
| United Kingdom | 17 October 2005 | Lex Records | CD | LEX036CD |
| United Kingdom | 17 October 2005 | Lex Records | LP | LEX036LP |

In May 2017, MF Doom's label, Metalface Records, released The Mouse and the Mask: Metalface Edition. This deluxe vinyl reissue included the full original album, the Occult Hymn EP, and previously unreleased tracks "Spokesman" and "Mad Nice" featuring Black Thought.

== Chart positions ==
| Chart (2005) | Peak position |
|---|---|
| U.S. Billboard 200 | 41 |
| U.S. Top R&B/Hip-Hop Albums | 31 |
| U.S. Top Independent Albums | 2 |

== Personnel ==
- Mark Linkous – bass guitar (track 3)
- Money Mark – keyboards (track 9)
- Jason DeMarco – executive producer
- Michael Schmelling – photography
- Virginia Consea – photography
- George Ella Rose – artwork
- Jacob Escobedo – artwork
- Gene Grimaldi – mastering
