= After the Disco =

Studio album by Broken Bells
- Released: January 31, 2014
- Recorded: October 2012 – November 2013
- Studios: Mondo Studio and Sonora Recorders (Los Angeles, California); Glenwood Place Studios (Burbank, California); Firehouse Studios (Pasadena, California)
- Genres: Indie rock; psychedelic pop; space rock
- Length: 45:46
- Label: Columbia
- Producer: Danger Mouse

Broken Bells chronology
Meyrin Fields (2011)	After the Disco (2014)	Into the Blue (2022)

Singles from After the Disco
- 1. "Holding On for Life" Released: November 21, 2013; 2. "After the Disco" Released: January 7, 2014; 3. "Perfect World" Released: February 4, 2014; 4. "Leave It Alone" Released: February 4, 2014; 5. "Control" Released: April 14, 2014

After the Disco is the second studio album by American alternative rock band Broken Bells. Recorded with the seventeen-piece Angel City String Orchestra and a four-piece choir, the album was released by Columbia Records on January 31, 2014. The album follows the band's 2013 single, "Holding On for Life", which features as the third track on the album. After the Disco was written by band members James Mercer and Brian Burton, and produced by Burton.

== Recording ==
The album was primarily recorded by the band at Mondo Studio in Los Angeles, California. The album, which started recording in early 2012, was recorded with a four-piece choir. The album was also recorded at two secondary recording studios, Sonora Recorders, also located in Los Angeles, and Firehouse Studios, located in Pasadena, California.

Orchestral and string recordings were conducted at the Glenwood Place Studios, located in Burbank, California, with The Angel City String Orchestra. With an arrangement of eleven violins, three cellos and three violas, conducted by Daniele Luppi, the orchestra recorded music for "Leave It Alone", "The Changing Lights", "Lazy Wonderland", "The Angel and the Fool" and "The Remains of Rock and Roll". Additional musicians, respectively playing tenor saxophone, trombone and trumpet, were also recorded for the ninth track "No Matter What You're Told".

== Packaging ==
The album cover for After the Disco, designed by Jacob Escobedo, was originally sketched by Escobedo during the early stages of the creative process for After the Disco. The initial sketches of the artwork, which reflects psychedelic themes of the 1960s and '70s and synthetic space art, originally inspired Mercer and Burton to take on elements of retro-futurism in their work, which led to the band recording the album with instruments from the '60s/'70s time period. James Mercer stated to Australian radio station Triple J:

"The guy who did the artwork for the first record, Jacob Escobedo, came up with that concept for the artwork [for this album], and in that moment we began talking about retro-futurism: so if you were to go back and look at the science fiction books released in the fifties and just how fascinating it is to see what people thought about the future. And for us, that kind of became like a theme. Brian's got all of this ancient gear – synthesisers from the time that synthesisers were being made - and they were incredibly futuristic at that time. And then as we got more into it ... the whole aesthetic started to evolve from there."

== Promotion ==
After the Disco was officially unveiled by the band and Columbia Records on October 8, 2013, after much media and fan speculation. A teaser trailer for the album, sporting a January 2014 release date, was released the same day, featuring a snippet of the third track, "Holding On for Life". The announcement of After the Disco was accompanied by a series of short films with the same title starring Kate Mara and Anton Yelchin. The album itself was released on January 31, 2014, peaking at number 5 in the Billboard 200.

== Composition ==
Musically, Disco works in a psych-pop / space rock sound. It also looks to disco, new wave and synth-pop styles.

== Reception ==
Professional ratings
Aggregate scores
Source	Rating
Metacritic	72/100
Review scores
Source	Rating
AllMusic	3.5/5 stars
Alternative Press	4/5 stars
NME	8/10
Pitchfork	5.4/10
Rolling Stone	3.5/5 stars
Slant Magazine	2/5 stars
USA Today	3.5/4 stars

At Alternative Press, Mike Usinger rated the album four stars out of five, and felt the album was "the perfect soundtrack for the morning after" a night out hurling it up. Edna Gunderson of USA Today rated the album three-and-a-half stars out of four, writing that the band "raise their game" on the release "by simply delivering fatter hooks, juicier melodies, dreamier vocals and more of the dark shimmer that enveloped the duo's 2010 debut." At Rolling Stone, Jon Dolan rated the album three-and-a-half stars out of five, stating that the release "is at once sleek and world-weary, often homing in on that sexy moment of malaise when the Seventies wanted to turn into the Eighties so badly but didn't quite know how to do it yet."

Kevin Liedel of Slant rated the album two out of five stars, cautioning that the album is a "yawner made by two artists whose impressive discography makes its failure that much more confounding." Lachlan Vass at Puluche.com gave After the Disco a less than favorable review, saying "Mercer’s delivery is generally good, Danger Mouse’s production is generally tight, but it just never crosses that threshold into greatness, despite a few glimmers of that potential. Too often though, these glimmers are drowned out by mediocrity. This record just feels like it should’ve been better than it is." Puluche gave the album a 62.5 out of 100. Larry Fitzmaurice of Pitchfork echoed this sentiment, stating that "After the Disco is a more cohesive record, and that turns out to be the problem: Mercer and Burton's eccentricities have been sanded down to a single, flattened plane."

== Track listing ==
All songs written by James Mercer and Brian Burton and produced by Burton.

No.	Title	Length
1.	"Perfect World"	6:24
2.	"After the Disco"	3:39
3.	"Holding On for Life"	3:56
4.	"Leave It Alone"	5:30
5.	"The Changing Lights"	3:48
6.	"Control"	3:41
7.	"Lazy Wonderland"	3:21
8.	"Medicine"	3:28
9.	"No Matter What You're Told"	3:50
10.	"The Angel and the Fool"	3:15
11.	"The Remains of Rock & Roll"	4:54
Total length:		45:46

== Personnel ==
Adapted from After the Disco liner notes.

Broken Bells

- Brian Burton – drums, organ, piano, synthesizer, percussion, bass, guitar
- James Mercer – vocals, guitar, bass, organ, synthesizer, percussion

Vocals

- Elizabeth Berg – backing vocals (tracks 3–5, 7, 9–11)
- Heather Porcaro – backing vocals (tracks 3–5, 7, 9–11)
- Myla Balugay – backing vocals (tracks 3–5, 7, 9–11)
- Rebecca Ann Stark – backing vocals (tracks 3–5, 7, 9–11)

Orchestra

- The Angel City String Orchestra – strings (tracks 4, 5, 7, 10, 11)

Daniele Luppi – conductor, string arrangement
Anton Riehl – score
Peter Kent – concertmaster, violin
Chris Tedesco – contractor

- Carolyn Osborn – violin
- Erika Walczak – violin
- Jennifer Walton – violin
- Judy Yoo – violin
- Julie Beavers – violin
- Norman Hughes – violin
- Shari Zippert – violin
- Sharon Jackson – violin
- Susan Chatman – violin
- Vladimir Polimatidi – violin
- Alisha Bauer – cello
- Stefanie Fife – cello
- Vanessa Freebairn-Smith – cello
- Adrianna Zoppo – viola
- Brianna Bandy – viola
- Jessica Van Velzen – viola

Additional musicians

- Kamasi Washington – tenor saxophone (track 9)
- David Ralicke – trombone (track 9)
- Nathaniel Walcott – trumpet (track 9)

Technical personnel

- Brian Burton – producer, programmer
- Kennie Takahashi – programmer, mixing, recording, engineer
- Todd Monfalcone – recording
- Jeff Peters – string recording (tracks 4, 5, 7, 10, 11)
- Jacob Dennis – assistant mixing, assistant engineer
- Chris Kahn – assistant mixing, assistant engineer
- Stephen Marcussen – mastering
- Todd Monfalcone – mixing, second engineer
- Geoff Neal – mixing assistance
- Laura Sisk – second engineer
- Jeremy Underwood – assistant engineer (strings)

Artistic personnel

- Jacob Escobedo – artwork

== Charts ==
=== Weekly charts ===
Chart (2014)	Peak position
Australian Albums (ARIA)	14
Austrian Albums (Ö3 Austria)	31
Belgian Albums (Ultratop Flanders)	29
Belgian Albums (Ultratop Wallonia)	56
Canadian Albums (Billboard)	3
Danish Albums (Hitlisten)	22
Dutch Albums (Album Top 100)	27
Finnish Albums (Suomen virallinen lista)	47
French Albums (SNEP)	74
German Albums (Offizielle Top 100)	28
New Zealand Albums (RMNZ)	31
Norwegian Albums (VG-lista)	36
Spanish Albums (Promusicae)	99
Swiss Albums (Schweizer Hitparade)	10
UK Albums (Official Charts)	12
US Billboard 200	5
US Top Alternative Albums (Billboard)	1
US Top Rock Albums (Billboard)	1
US Indie Store Album Sales (Billboard)	1

=== Year-end charts ===
Chart (2014)	Position
US Top Rock Albums	52
US Alternative Albums (Billboard)	34

== Release history ==
Country	Date	Format	Label	Catalog no.
Germany	January 31, 2014	CD	Columbia	88883 77161 2
Germany	January 31, 2014	Digital download	Columbia	none
Germany	January 31, 2014	Vinyl	Columbia	88883 77161 1
United Kingdom	February 3, 2014	CD	Columbia	88883 77161 2
United Kingdom	February 3, 2014	Digital download	Columbia	none
United Kingdom	February 3, 2014	Vinyl	Columbia	88883 77161 1
Australia	February 4, 2014	Digital download	Columbia	none
United States	February 4, 2014	CD	Columbia	88883 77161 2
United States	February 4, 2014	Digital download	Columbia	none
United States	February 4, 2014	Vinyl	Columbia	88883 77161 1
