= List of 12 oz. Mouse episodes =

12 oz. Mouse is an American surreal humour and psychological thriller animated television series created by Matt Maiellaro for Cartoon Network's late-night programming block, Adult Swim. The series revolves around Mouse Fitzgerald, nicknamed "Fitz" (voiced by Maiellaro), an alcoholic mouse who performs odd jobs so he can buy more beer. Together with his chinchilla companion Skillet, Fitz begins to recover suppressed memories that he once had a wife and a child who have now vanished. This leads him to seek answers about his past and the shadowy forces that seem to be manipulating his world.

The pilot first aired as a special presentation on June 19, 2005, and the series later started officially airing from October 23, 2005, until ending on December 17, 2006, with a total of 20 episodes over the course of 2 seasons. A special, entitled "Spider-Man Special", aired on November 6, 2005, and a stand-alone webisode, entitled "Enter the Sandmouse", was later released online on May 16, 2007.

In 2018, a double-length special, entitled "Invictus", aired on October 14 and it was announced that 12 oz. Mouse had also been revived as a series. The final episode of the third season originally aired unannounced on April 1, 2020, as part of Adult Swim's annual April Fools Day stunt. The first 10 episodes from the third season premiered nightly (except weekends) from July 20 to July 31, 2020.

== Series overview ==
Series overview
Season	Episodes	Originally released	
Season	Episodes	First released	Last released
1	7	June 19, 2005	January 1, 2006
"Spider-Man Special"		November 6, 2005	
2	13	September 25, 2006	December 18, 2006
Webisode		May 16, 2007	
"Invictus"		October 12, 2018	
3	11	July 20, 2020	July 31, 2020

== Episodes ==
=== Season 1 (2005–06) ===
No. overall	No. in season	Title	Written by	Original release date	Prod. code
1	1	"Hired"	Matt Maiellaro	June 19, 2005	101
Mouse Fitzgerald is hired for a job by Shark. His first task is to transport a Rectangular Businessman to an important meeting, but Fitz instead takes him to a porno set and then blows up the building. After robbing a bank, Fitz and his friend Skillet buy large amounts of alcohol and cause mayhem all over town. Fitz then returns to Shark who reviews his failed assignment. After discovering Shark is bulletproof (by shooting him) Fitz decides to take Shark's next job. Note: This episode is the pilot which aired as a special presentation in the summer of 2005.
2	2	"Signals"	Matt Maiellaro	October 23, 2005	102
Shark gives Fitz his next job: to help Eye, a giant eye, get "50 mil" owed to him by the magical Golden Joe (voiced by Vishal Roney). Fitz approaches Joe at the bar and hatches a plan to trick Shark and Eye. Fitz and Joe spend the "50 mil" to buy a tank and break Skillet out of prison. Fitz then blows up the building. When Eye comes to reclaim his money, Fitz admits he "pissed it away" and sings about the sunset. But Eye uses a parachute and lands on the cannon of the tank.
3	3	"Rooster"	Matt Maiellaro	October 30, 2005	103
Fitz has mysterious dreams about his past, when he had a wife and a child. Skillet brings him a package containing a homing corndog. Meanwhile, Shark meets with Rectangular Businessman, Eye, and Man/Woman to show them a slideshow about "asprind", which he says, leads to rabies. The corndog leads Fitz to Roostre, a corndog farmer who seems to know things about Fitz's past. He mentions to Fitz that a person named C.J. Muff left Q109. The New Guy, a red ghost-like being, kidnaps Skillet and tortures him with exotica music and hula-hooping.
4	4	"Spider"	Matt Maiellaro	November 6, 2005	104
A giant spider appears in Fitz's house and weaves an arrow in its web. Skillet manages to escape from The New Guy and rejoins Fitz. When Fitz discovers new clues, the Clock appears and doses him with time gas, compelling him to destroy the evidence. Fitz and Skillet break into a music store and rock out. Peanut Cop and Producer Man show up, and Producer Man offers Fitz a record deal – until his head is mysteriously sliced in half. Meanwhile, Liquor reads a letter erroneously delivered to him written by someone named "Mosquitor". A large amount of blood drips from the letter. Fitz delivers the record he made to Shark. Its title is "F-Off". Back at home, Fitz finds a severed hand that Shark apparently left under his bed. Shark says it's also a record and tells him to "Spin it".
5	5	"Rememorized"	Matt Maiellaro	November 13, 2005	105
Shark threatens Fitz, introducing him to Pronto, a deadly archer. Fitz decides he's hungry and heads to the diner, where he and Skillet get into a gun fight with someone they don't even know. Meanwhile, Shark and the Rectangular Businessman gather a large crowd of people and place strange helmets on their heads. Fitz, Skillet and Man/Woman go to the bar where they find Rhoda, the bartender, dead, shot full of arrows.
6	6	"Spharktasm"	Matt Maiellaro	November 20, 2005	106
A new Rhoda appears and tries to pass off the dead Rhoda as "a joke". Fitz incapacitates Man/Woman and forces a reluctant Rhoda to give him answers about what's going on. Fitz travels to the corndog farm, taking Roostre, Golden Joe, and Peanut Cop captive, and has another flashback in which his wife encounters the Shadowy Figure. Roostre reveals that C.J. Muff's real name is Bermingham. At the farm, The New Guy appears and tries to hypnotize everyone with his music. Shark and Rectangular Businessman discover Rhoda is cooperating with Fitz.
7	7	"Adventure Mouse"	Matt Maiellaro	January 1, 2006	107
Rectangular Businessman executes Rhoda by telepathically slicing his head in half, revealing a fire-breathing snake inside. Fitz takes down The New Guy with a rocket-powered skateboard and helps Skillet and the rest escape the shack. Skillet discovers an invitation to a fancy party Shark is holding, and Fitz decides to crash it. Shark and Rectangular Businessman get fed up with the Eye and decide to punish him. Rectangular Businessman makes Pronto enter Fitz's house to free the Hand from his icebox. The Hand subsequently cuts off the Eye's leg with a pair of shears. At the party, Fitz is sucked into a passageway behind a bookshelf. As Skillet is shot with a dart and Eye collapses in a puddle of blood, Shark watches from his control room and laughs evilly. Note: This episode originally aired in an incomplete state. Lighting effects and end credits were added to the episode by the next replay.

=== Spider-Man Special (2005) ===
Title	Written by	Original release date	Prod. code
"12 oz. Mouse Spider-Man Special" "Spider-Man Special"	Matt Maiellaro	November 6, 2005	104b
An alternate version of "Spider" with several scenes shortened and Skillet's drum solo added in. Rhoda and Shark's conversation is cut down, thus removing Golden Joe's appearance, Mosquitor's letter was cut down and the dripping blood was removed, and Shark's conversation with Fitz about the record is shortened to "Don't look under your bed." These cuts made room for an extended drum solo which went on for about three and half minutes. This special aired directly following the premiere of the standard version of "Spider", it only aired twice, with a rerun later that night.

=== Season 2 (2006) ===
No. overall	No. in season	Title	Written by	Original release date	Prod. code
8	1	"Bowtime"	Matt Maiellaro	September 25, 2006	201
Roostre, Joe and Peanut Cop break out of the jetcar and crash Shark's party. Fitz is trapped in a series of illusions or artificial realities created by Shark, including one in which he is attacked by a bow tie robot. In another sequence, Fitz ponders the nature of memory and time travel, and sees a baby mouse morph into Spider. Back at his store, Liquor lures Roostre into the cellar, where he clubs him and traps him in Spider's web. Liquor cryptically warns that Roostre will "set the alarm." The New Guy saves Skillet from the Clock's time gas, and they, Fitz, and the injured Eye escape into the desert. Frustrated, Shark sends Pronto after them.
9	2	"Surgery Circus"	Matt Maiellaro	October 2, 2006	202
Fitz, Skillet, New Guy and the injured Eye travel through the desert. Peanut Cop and Golden Joe visit Liquor and fake his death in front of Shark's cameras. After Fitz and the rest arrive at the store, Liquor performs surgery on Eye. He also reveals a secret hidden behind his liquor shelf: a second Eye, identical to the first. Shark cruises around town in his customized car, exploding buildings and people. The Hand breaks down the door to Liquor's store and attacks Peanut Cop and Golden Joe. After the end credits of this episode, a text is shown backwards saying, "Rules Are The Rules"
10	3	"Booger Haze"	Matt Maiellaro	October 9, 2006	203
The Eye's surgery is a success, and his leg is repaired. Roostre, now cocooned, gets dragged to a cave by Spider. Peanut Cop and Golden Joe, still at Liquor's shop, attempt to fight off the Hand in vain until Liquor traps it in a jar. Spider plays "Booger Haze" on a piano, creating The Music, a swarm of musical notes. The Music flies to Roostre's farm and destroys one of the large corndogs. Shark and Rectangular Businessman, still in Shark's customized car, pick up the annoying Green-Sweatered Woman, which leads to Rectangular Businessman telepathically ripping her in half. Fitz devises a plan, and he and Skillet zoom off on the skateboard to Roostre's farm, where they are attacked by the Music and find themselves trapped in Roostre's basement with a large supply of firearms.
11	4	"Star Wars VII"	Matt Maiellaro	October 16, 2006	204
Fitz and Skillet discover a clock radio, a map, and a corndog-shaped rocketship in Roostre's basement. They load all the guns into the rocketship and take off, blowing up the remaining cache of bombs as they leave. Shark's car breaks down, and Rectangular Businessman decides to buy a gold-and-diamond-encrusted harmonica. Rectangular Businessman looks at harmonicas in a harmonica store for a long time. Shark tries to start his car for a very long time. Rectangular Businessman does not buy a harmonica; Shark's car does not start.
12	5	"Enjoy the Arm"	Matt Maiellaro	October 23, 2006	205
While in space, Fitz and Skillet look down toward their planet discover a "real city" some distance from the one they live in. The corndog rocket runs out of fuel in orbit, sending them crashing into the 750th floor of a tower. Roostre tells Spider about his Corn-Droid, which he wants to use to destroy everything. Shark continues to be frustrated by his car. Fitz and Skillet repair the Green-Sweatered Woman and turn her into a Terminator-style robot. Later, Fitz inserts the clock radio from Roostre's basement into a hole in the wall and discovers a massive hidden closet that contains every piece of clothing he's ever owned. At his store, Liquor performs a stand-up comedy routine for the Eyes. He then goes into a back room and talks to the Shadowy Figure, which seems to be a cardboard cutout with a light behind it. Meanwhile, one of the Eyes grows an arm and pulls out a gun.
13	6	"Auraphull"	Matt Maiellaro (credited as No One)	October 30, 2006	206
This episode is primarily composed of video sequences set to music from the show. Later, while stoned and drunk, Peanut Cop visits the hat store and decides to become a fireman.
14	7	"Meat Warrior"	Matt Maiellaro	November 6, 2006	207
Rectangular Businessman talks to the Clock about Shark. Peanut Cop, now a fireman, picks up Liquor and goes drunk driving in his jet-powered firetruck. Fitz and Skillet examine the map they found in Roostre's basement and discover a tunnel that leads out of their town. Pronto steals a necklace called the "Animal Chain" from Shark's control room. At Liquor's store, someone shoots Peanut Cop with darts and traps him in a room with the Shadowy Figure. On the 750th floor, Liquor meets up with Fitz and reveals that Rooster needs his missing hand to activate the Corn-Droid. In the sewers beneath the town, Roostre leads Spider to the hidden Corn-Droid.
15	8	"Meaty Dreamy"	Matt Maiellaro	November 13, 2006	208
After being attacked by Pronto, the Hand crawls into Producer Man's brain and controls his body from the inside. Shark and Rectangular Businessman load up a big gun and drive to the gas station that Fitz and Skillet previously set on fire. Rectangular Businessman mentions to Shark that the townspeople have lost their "program" and are going "out of their minds." Shark shoots one of them. Fitz, Skillet and Liquor use intravenous injections of meat to get to sleep, and Liquor is haunted by a strange dream, in which he's standing in a graveyard. Man/Woman is admiring a flower on a strange empty plain when Shark's face appears in the moon and speaks to her, then a snake slithers toward her and breathes fire into the air. Golden Joe shows Peanut Cop an unusual photo of the two Eyes, in which one of them appears to have grown a strange purple limb in place of a leg. Peanut Cop tells him that "the code is replicating itself in a bad way", and that "it's almost over." Liquor awakes, and Producer Man takes the elevator up to the 750th floor of the tower where Fitz, Skillet, Liquor, the Green-Sweatered Woman, and Shark's burning bug await him as Liquor commands everyone on the 750th floor to "all weapons cock." Note: At the end of the credits, it reads T minus 35 days, stating the number of days until the last televised episode.
16	9	"Corndog Chronicles"	N/A	November 20, 2006	209
Fitz has dreams about talking to Shark regarding other dreams in his office. He describes the dreams to Shark as being "about the end, with fragments of the beginning." Shark tells Fitz that they're "running out of time" and offers him a bottle of "Asprind" pills from Asprindland. Fitz wakes up, but Liquor promptly knocks him unconscious again. Fitz then dreams about talking to Roostre at his corndog farm. The two of them discuss Q109, "xenomorphinetation", a report chart, robots they built, and synthetic carbopolymers that "got them through." Fitz awakens and climbs the giant clothes closet to find a gold locket which resembles the Animal Chain that Pronto stole. Meanwhile, Pronto goes to a graveyard, where he gives the Animal Chain to an eight-armed beast named Amalockh. Amalockh grows enormous and begins destroying the city. Liquor tells Fitz the beast's name and that he's there to kill them all. Fitz resolves to "kill him back." Note: After the credits, a message appears that says "dne reven lliw esuom" or "mouse will never end." Fitz appears at the top, saying "Good thing I brought all this beer."
17	10	"Eighteen"	Matt Maiellaro	November 27, 2006	210
After traveling up the elevator to the 750th floor of the tower, Producer Man reaches Fitz, Skillet, and Liquor. Liquor x-rays his head to discover that the Hand is inside, translates the beeping sounds he is making, and claims that the Hand "wants to get back to his arm and kill the person that separated him." Liquor tells Fitz that the key he found is "the key to imagination" which they'll need the next day. Meanwhile, Shark kidnaps Golden Joe and the New Guy, stitches Golden Joe's mouth shut and brings them to his video monitoring room, where the Eye is shackled to a pipe. Rectangular Businessman delivers "Shark's Great Movie" to Fitz, in which Shark tells him, "You're just information. That's what we keep inside our heads." Fitz places a bone on Liquor's head, giving an easy target for the Cyber-Green-Sweatered-Woman if he doesn't comply, and makes him lead the way through the burning city. Shark explodes much of the city, including Fitz's jet car, the liquor store, Rhoda's bar, the Eye's island, and New Guy's home, after which he devours the New Guy. In the graveyard, Amalockh eats Pronto and begins performing the "breakdance of death." Shark watches this on his video monitor, and furiously demands that Rectangular Businessman bring him every "hovervac" and "tie-bot." Liquor leads Fitz to the sewer system that Roostre previously entered, while hundreds of hovervacs and tie-bots awaken elsewhere. The Shadowy Figure drives his shadowy van up to Peanut Cop who is standing on a street, setting things on fire. Peanut Cop asks for help, and the Shadowy Figure shoots him with an extra-strength dart. Note: During the credits, an anagram appears that reads "noso/ledlik/tegs/khsar." When unscrambled, it reads "Soon/Killed/Gets/Shark," or "Shark gets killed soon."
18	11	"Pre-Reckoning"	N/A	December 4, 2006	211
Fitz, Skillet, Liquor, Cyber-Green-Sweatered-Woman and Producer Man descend the sewer system's ladder to reach Roostre, as Fitz worries about his friends in the burning city above. Liquor explains to him that they've probably all been eaten by now, stating that "it" reads "...and the shark shall eat every creature that is friends of the green one." As Liquor, Roostre, and Fitz are talking, Liquor states that the language is "giving out" and the three of them begin speaking in jumbled, nonsensical sentences. Peanut Cop flies out of the Shadowy Figure's van onto the street when it comes to a stop, and he too begins speaking in jumbled phrases. Shark soon reveals that gas is being pumped into the city which causes an inability to communicate. The Eye and Shark discuss the fact that time in the city is frozen at 2:22, and that the Eye was waiting for his dad to pick him up at school when it froze. The Clock tells Shark that it has run out of the gas. The hovervacs and tie-bots wreak havoc on the city, killing people and destroying vehicles, buildings, dolls and other property. Peanut Cop enters the Tempus Putkhe Clock Shop while Amalockh spits out Pronto's burning remains and plucks a flower from the ground in the graveyard. Shark watches Amalockh on his video monitor, and states that "if that flower reaches the right person we're all dead, and that will be a great disappointment to me and all that me has become." Fitz, Skillet, and Cyber-Green-Sweatered Woman fight off the hovervacs and tie-bots until they reach the safety of the Clock Shop's back room. Inside, Peanut Cop hands Fitz a mask, which allows them to breathe "anti-anti-language gas" which Peanut Cop claims he made from propane. As the tie-bots attempt to break into the room, Peanut Cop throws a functional clock out the door, causing several tie-bots to explode. A hovervac quickly smashes the clock, and the tie-bots proceed to break down the door. However, Fitz, Skillet, Cyber-Green-Sweatered-Woman, and Peanut Cop have escaped through an air vent in the ceiling by the time they enter. Meanwhile, in the sewer system, Liquor karate chops off Roostre's hook and replaces it with The Hand so that he can activate Corn-Droid. Corn-Droid comes to life and unveils a plethora of guns which extend from a hole in its stomach. Note: This episode originally aired on Adult Swim Video with an unfinished mono audio mix, including missing sound effects and no reverb on Golden Joe's voice. Note: A secret message is at the end of the credits that reads: 14 32 21 37 28 54 30 19 45 29 20 45; 31 54 18 21 19 16; 54 28 35 19 28 32 54 45 21 14 39+49 The code is derived from a QWERTY keyboard, the letter Q being defined as 13 and all the other keys, including non-characters, numbered sequentially from there. Decoded, the message reads "Who's funding your slush now?"
19	12	"Farewell"	Matt Maiellaro	December 11, 2006	212
Fitz, Skillet, Cyber-Green-Sweatered-Woman, and Peanut Cop travel through the ventilation shaft and shoot several tie-bots inside. Peanut Cop throws a grenade and blasts his fireman's helmet off. Fitz, Skillet, and Cyber-Green-Sweatered-Woman burst out the end of the ventilation shaft, which opens into Shark's observation room. Together, they de-shackle the Eye, destroy the evil Eye, shoot Shark into bloody pieces, and set Golden Joe free. After hearing some faint music emanating from Shark's remains, Fitz digs inside of them and pulls out the New Guy, who has been partially digested. Fitz pulls a lever on Shark's video monitoring console, which opens a room containing a metal-plated, shark-shaped aircraft. The Eye says that he's afraid of flying, so he decides to walk to the river and carry the New Guy on top of him. Somewhere outside the burning city, Rectangular Businessman makes his bank/home appear by simply speaking the word "appear." Inside, he converses with the Shadowy Figure, telling it that "the clock shop was sealed off when this began," "Shark was just a pawn," "the 'aspirind' farms are near harvest," "Mouse has done everything exactly as predicted," and "Amalockh brings the darkness", among other things. The Shadowy Figure begins glowing, possibly in an attempt to reveal its "true form", but Rectangular Businessman transforms the Shadowy Figure into dark water and traps him in a jar. Rectangular Businessman then puts his home into "ship mode" and flies away. Meanwhile, Corn-Droid flies throughout the city, destroying hovervacs with ease. In the sewer system, Liquor discovers Roostre's eyeless, unconscious body, and Muff, a floating orb that glows blue. Muff inquires where Fitz is, and tells Liquor that the aspirind fields must be destroyed. Muff says they'll meet at the river, but they'll need Fitz. Liquor decides to follow the Corn-Droid. As Fitz steers the shark-shaped aircraft, Peanut Cop reveals that the hovervacs harvest aspirind, that it's "what they're protecting," and that fields of it are everywhere. Below, several tie-bots blow open a street, uncovering massive amounts of aspirind, which the hovervacs quickly suck into their arm-like appendages. In the shark-shaped aircraft, Skillet mans the gun turret and fights off several tie-bots before the aircraft is shot down by Rectangular Businessman, still flying his airship. Liquor watches as the shark-shaped aircraft crashes into a building before screeching to a halt on a city street. After exiting the burning wreckage, Fitz clutches Skillet's helmet and goggles, as he, Peanut Cop, and Golden Joe lament the loss of their friend, who is nowhere to be found. Meanwhile, Rectangular Businessman's ship is destroyed by the now gigantic Amalockh, sending the jar of water in which the Shadowy Figure is trapped flying out into the flames of the city. Note: When this episode aired on Adult Swim Fix, several sound effects and lines of dialog were absent, including the Cop's dialog before breaking out of the shaft, the Cop and Golden Joes' argument about who gets to drive, the squelching sound of the water Shadowy Figure and the reverb to Joe's voice in his final spoken line of dialog.
20	13	"Prolegomenon"	Matt Maiellaro	December 18, 2006	213
Fitz drops Skillet's helmet and goggles on the ground and wanders into the burning diner, where he walks up to a red-glowing pinball machine and starts playing. The pinball machine's bumpers are covered in cryptic red symbols. Soon, a pink cloud with orbiting musical notes descends from the sky outside and flashes brightly, causing the wrecked diner to return to pristine condition. The pink cloud says that her name is Archeus, after which Fitz tells her he can't read the symbols on the pinball machine. Archeus tells him he'd be able to read them, if he gives up the fight for "everything." Fitz says that she doesn't make sense, and Archeus responds "No one understands this." She tells him that his wife and child are alive, but they need his help and warns, "Don't believe what you haven't been shown." She tells him that "the square guy can afford technology to away the mind." Archeus insists that Fitz look to her, but Fitz tells her to leave. She says "Skillet needs you--" Then a tiny ball containing Skillet's image rises out of the pinball machine and floats in the air. Hurtling past planets and stars, the 'camera' zooms in on Earth, and into a forest in Georgia. Within the forest, on a tiny particle in the cap of mushroom, we are shown a four-story, weapon-guarded building. Within, a purple man and a pink man, both wearing glasses and business suits, converse over an unconscious Fitz. Fitz's head is shown to be attached to a giant orange machine, through which he is breathing. The purple man, who speaks in Shark's voice, asks the pink man, who speaks in Rectangular Businessman's voice, if he's prepared for the possibility that Fitz may awaken. They mention how they – as Shark and Rectangular Businessman – have been killed. The pink man tells the purple man that "money solves everything." The purple man says "that's great, but the rodent is still alive", referring to a liquid-filled tube in which Skillet floats. A man who speaks in the voice of the Eye is attached to another giant machine, with each of his eyes individually connected to the machine by tubes. The pink man tells the nurse (who speaks in the voice of Green-Sweatered-Woman) to give the mouse 1200 CC's of "steribolium." The nurse says that will kill him, but the pink man insists on her carrying out his orders. The pink man notes to the purple man that "she's there," referring to Archeus. The purple man says that's impossible because "we blew up the whole ship with my cool bombs." The pink man responds, "you can destroy the flesh, but you cannot destroy the faith." The purple man rants that he won't be taken down by religion, while the pink man says his god is his money. "I will not be responsible for an entire nation," the purple man states. "I can't, legally." The pink man says that the power of Archeus is drawing Fitz out. In another room, the nurse draws a gun and talks to a blue man, who speaks in the voice of Peanut Cop, telling him "Archeus lives in the stream." After this, the two of them shoot and kill the purple man. The pink man stops a bullet with his telekinetic powers, but the blue man appears behind him and shoots him in the back of the head. The nurse then turns to the blue man saying, "contact the new angel and tell her to come for us. Tell her it's time." After this, we see the Clock on the wall of the diner, as its minute hand moves to 2:23. Peanut Cop and Golden Joe are standing over Fitz, who has just woken up, asking him to go get a sandwich. After realizing that the time has changed, Fitz is surprised by Skillet, who jumps through the diner window and lands on top of him. Everyone walks outside, and Archeus departs, saying, "Believe in it, Fitz. We believe in you." Fitz tells Archeus, "I will." Golden Joe is confused by what Fitz said, and he and Peanut Cop say that they thought "this was finished." Fitz says he did too, "but I guess we're not." Fitz, Skillet, Golden Joe, and Peanut Cop walk down the street of the now-restored town, and above them the sun sets in a real sky. Elsewhere, after the credits, a glass jar falls out of the sky and breaks on the street. The Shadowy Figure emerges from it in liquid form, and hops away. Note: Credits weren't shown when the episode was originally aired. Credits were added to the next replay. A secret message is at the end of the credits that reads: Skillet Eats Extra Yummy Otter Uvula Over Nutmeg Tossed Huevos Especial With Every Breakfast. When reading the first letter of each word together, a secret message appears: SEE YOU ON THE WEB.

=== Webisode (2007) ===
Title	Written by	Original release date
"Enter the Sandmouse"	Matt Maiellaro	May 16, 2007 (online); October 12, 2018 (television)
Mouse, Skillet, Golden Joe and Peanut Cop trek through the desert after leaving the city behind. However, Golden Joe is carried away by a bird and Peanut Cop later vanishes in a flash of light. Now alone in the desert, Fitz and Skillet live in a house made of sand and their own spit. They get into a gunfight with a strange, gun-toting woman named Lee. After the woman mentions something about Square Guy and finding the new angel (or "new age-el") Fitz decides to trust her and invites her into his house. Lee gives Fitz a gift: a silver bullet which she warns is the only thing that can kill her when she turns into the She-Wolf. After the credits, a gunshot is heard, and Lee (as the She-Wolf) appears snarling in front of the screen. Note: This webisode officially aired on television on October 12, 2018.

=== "Invictus" (2018) ===
Title	Directed by	Written by	Original release date	US viewers (millions)
"Invictus"	Matt Maiellaro	Matt Maiellaro	October 12, 2018 (online); October 14, 2018 (television)	0.478 (TV debut)
Fitz returns to the simulation world he escaped from in order to save his friends, after a talking bee, voiced by Dana Snyder, who's working with Shark encourages him to.

=== Season 3 (2020) ===
No. overall	No. in season	Title	Directed by	Written by	Original release date	Prod. code	US viewers (millions)
21	1	"First 12"	Matt Maiellaro	Matt Maiellaro	July 20, 2020	302	0.429
After entering the portal in "Invictus", Fitz and his friends are scattered to different worlds. In Lotharganin, Fitz meets scientists Aria and Professor Wilx who are trying to escape to Outer Earth. Golden Joe performs in concert with Kiki, his DJ. Joe is abducted and locked in a room with Peanut Cop under the surveillance of pineapple guards. Roostre is trapped in the World of Muck. Buzby hears a radio transmission sent by Muff from Q109 (George Lowe).
22	2	"Awaken"	Matt Maiellaro	Matt Maiellaro	July 21, 2020	303	0.405
Skillet rescues Buzby, and they escape as Shark and Rectangular Businessman reconstitute themselves into a genetic abomination. Fitz's electric guitar shredding proves to Aria and Wilx that he is "The Core" and has the knowledge to escape from the artificial worlds. At Shyd Industries, Industry Man hires The New Guy for a dangerous job.
23	3	"Adrift"	Matt Maiellaro	Matt Maiellaro	July 22, 2020	304	0.407
Golden Joe and Peanut have trouble starting up their jet skis. A ship arrives at Lotharganin, and the T.O.P.A.Z. defense system fails to stop it.
24	4	"You Made This"	Matt Maiellaro	Matt Maiellaro	July 23, 2020	305	0.353
Eye emerges from the ship. Aria reveals that Fitz himself was the inventor of the 222 artificial worlds in which they are now trapped. On Outer Earth, the real version of Peanut Cop questions Manwoman about a strange box that appeared at her house. Joe and Peanut kill their pineapple captors with exploding tropical drinks. Wilx, who is secretly in league with Clock, announces that he has secured the Core.
25	5	"Because They Could"	Matt Maiellaro	Matt Maiellaro	July 24, 2020	306	0.313
Roostre escapes to a desert where he meets a precocious monster-killing Kid. Peanut and Joe escape their underwater prison and ride across the ocean on jet skis. Aria, Fitz, and Eye fend off a Tie-Bot attack. Manwoman witnesses the Box of Worlds opening, and it contains an image of Wilx.
26	6	"Reveal"	Matt Maiellaro	Matt Maiellaro	July 27, 2020	307	0.471
At Shyd Industries, the Shadowy Figure meets with Sirus the Architect who designed the locking system that made the Box of Worlds escape-proof. It is revealed that Shadowy Figure, Clock, and Industry Man are all aspects of the same being who controls Shyd Industries. Fitz receives an injection that recovers his memories of how he invented the Box and how to find the way out. Wilx betrays Aria, Fitz, and Eye, trapping them in a laser cage so he alone can escape the Box.
27	7	"Prime Time Nursery Rhyme"	Matt Maiellaro	Matt Maiellaro	July 28, 2020	308	0.394
Fitz realizes that the Box of Worlds is about to implode. Peanut and Golden Joe arrive at Lotharganin, and they're the only ones who can stop the base's nuclear reactor from melting down. Sirus transports Roostre to Shyd Industries and attempts to recruit him in a secret plot to stop the exploitation of the Box technology. Wilx teleports to the futuristic city near Shyd Industries, only to be killed by Kiki on a jet ski.
28	8	"Here We Come"	Matt Maiellaro	Matt Maiellaro	July 29, 2020	309	0.416
Industry Man resurrects Wilx and questions Roostre on the whereabouts of Fitz, whom he fears will expose Shyd Industries' secrets if he escapes from the Box. Peanut Cop stops the nuclear meltdown, but immediately steps on a bomb and is liquified. The Green-Sweatered Woman alerts the Castellica, an AI construct in the form of an outer space RV castle piloted by Elize and Olof (Elize Ryd and Olof Mörck of Amaranthe), and sends it to save Fitz and Aria.
29	9	"Portal to the Doorway"	Matt Maiellaro	Matt Maiellaro	July 30, 2020	310	0.407
Eye jetpacks up to the Castellica and stops it from crashing. Elize and Olof join forces with Aria, Fitz and the others, as they realize they're all working against Industry Man at the behest of Sirus. Roostre jumps off the Shyd tower and, realizing that death is an illusion, sinks through the ground and returns to the desert world. Elize and Olof perform their song "Portal to the Doorway" then summon a thunderstorm, which teleports their allies across multiple worlds.
30	10	"Final Beginning"	Matt Maiellaro	Matt Maiellaro	July 31, 2020	311	0.357
The thunderstorm transports all of Fitz's allies to the desert quadrant, where the Kid arms them with futuristic weapons. They then jump through a portal to Shyd Industries for the final confrontation with Industry Man. A video recording shows that Aria was complicit in trapping Fitz in the Box. Industry Man transforms into a monster and battles everyone, only to be killed by Kiki on a jet ski. Aria reveals she is "the one you've been looking for" and triggers an explosion that destroys the top of Shyd tower, leaving the fates of everyone unknown. Elsewhere, as a cliffhanger to end the season, Francis befriends Wilx, and they show up at Manwoman's house to claim the Box.
31	11	"Francis, Cheap & Out of Control"	Matt Maiellaro & Corey Sherman	Matt Maiellaro & Corey Sherman	April 1, 2020	301	0.335
A student named Francis interviews the inhabitants of Cardboard City for his school newspaper. Note: This episode originally aired out-of-order months before the rest of the season on April 1, 2020, as part of Adult Swim annual April Fools Day Stunt. It was also re-aired on July 31, 2020, in its correct placement in the season.

== New Years Marathon (2005) ==
A marathon aired on the night of New Year's Eve 2005 on Adult Swim, consisting of the first six episodes of season 1, and concluding with then unfinished season finale, "Adventure Mouse."

The bumps aired during the marathon featured new scenes, such as:

- Fitz and Skillet surfing.
- Fitz and Skillet shooting at a skeleton.
- Fitz & Skillet continue shooting at the skeleton to pieces.
- Peanut Cop getting blown up by a bomb at Rhoda's Bar.
- Peanut Cop gets blown up on streets by another bomb.
- Peanut Cop in a crudely drawn Jail Cell gets blown up by a bomb.
- Green Sweater Woman talking to Liquor in his liquor store.
- Green Sweater Woman complaining to the Producer Man with flowers.
- Eye tap dancing on an island.
  - In "Eighteen", Eye claims that this 'eyeland' is his home.
- Fitz playing his guitar at the Music Void.
- Golden Joe reading an excerpt from The Great Gatsby.

== See also ==
- 12 oz. Mouse
