= Broken Bells (album) =

Studio album by Broken Bells
- Released: March 9, 2010
- Recorded: 2009–2010
- Studio: Mondo Studio, Los Angeles, California; Glenwood Place Studios, Burbank, California (strings)
- Genre: Indie rock; alternative rock; space pop; folk rock; baroque pop
- Length: 37:30
- Label: Columbia
- Producer: Danger Mouse

Broken Bells chronology
Broken Bells (2010)	Meyrin Fields (2011)

Singles from Broken Bells
- 1. "The High Road" Released: December 21, 2009; 2. "The Ghost Inside" Released: June 28, 2010; 3. "October" Released: August 16, 2010; 4. "The Ghost Inside/Meyrin Fields" Released: October 25, 2010; 5. "Vaporize (US)" Released: January 25, 2011

Professional ratings
Aggregate scores
Source	Rating
AnyDecentMusic?	7.1/10
Metacritic	71/100
Review scores
Source	Rating
AllMusic	3/5 stars
The A.V. Club	B−
Chicago Tribune	3/4 stars
Entertainment Weekly	B+
The Guardian	3/5 stars
The Independent	4/5 stars
Los Angeles Times	3.5/4 stars
Pitchfork	7.2/10
Rolling Stone	4/5 stars
Spin	6/10

Broken Bells is the debut album from Broken Bells, consisting of James Mercer of indie rock band The Shins with producer and multi-instrumentalist Brian Burton (aka Danger Mouse), and was released on March 9, 2010.

In 2011 Broken Bells was nominated for Best Alternative Music Album at the 53rd Grammy Awards.

== Background ==
After forming in 2009, Broken Bells released their eponymous debut studio album, Broken Bells, in March 2010. Released to positive critical reception, Broken Bells was a success critically and commercially, peaking at No. 7 on the Billboard Billboard album chart, and appearing in the top 20 in Australia, Canada and Denmark. The album also appeared at No. 126 on the Billboard Hot 100 End-year chart for 2010. Two singles were released during the album's cycle. "The High Road", released in 2009 and featuring the Broken Bells track of the same name, peaked at No. 10 on the Billboard Alternative Songs chart, which is the highest peak by the band on the chart so far, and was certified Gold in Canada by Music Canada. "The Ghost Inside", also featuring the eponymous Broken Bells track and "Meyrin Fields", was released in 2010. The band also released an extended play during the album's cycle in 2011, entitled Meyrin Fields.

== Composition ==
Alongside space pop, Broken Bells leans into "sparkling [and] dense" folk rock. Baroque pop flourishes feature highly, from "Mongrel Heart"'s mariachi trumpet to the Beach Boys-recalling vocals of "Your Head Is On Fire".

== Release ==
In addition to the standard edition of the album, a deluxe version was released, designed as a music box. When opened, it played a track titled "The Overture," which was not included on the album. The box also contained stickers, posters, lobby cards and a leather book.

== Promotion ==
The first single from the album, "The High Road", was offered as a free download from the band's website on December 21, 2009, before being officially released on December 22, 2009.

The music video for "The Ghost Inside" featured actress Christina Hendricks and was inspired by 1970s science fiction and the "Golden Age of Hollywood".

== Track listing ==
All songs written by James Mercer and Brian Burton.

No.	Title	Length
1.	"The High Road"	3:52
2.	"Vaporize"	3:30
3.	"Your Head Is on Fire"	3:04
4.	"The Ghost Inside"	3:19
5.	"Sailing to Nowhere"	3:46
6.	"Trap Doors"	3:19
7.	"Citizen"	4:29
8.	"October"	3:40
9.	"Mongrel Heart"	4:24
10.	"The Mall & Misery"	4:07

Bonus Tracks
No.	Title	Length
11.	"An Easy Life"	2:44

- Instrumental version appeared as a B-side of "The High Road" single.
- Vocal version found through iTunes LP version.
- Extra track "Meyrin Fields" appeared as a B-side of "The Ghost Inside" single.

== Charts ==
=== Weekly charts ===
Chart (2010)	Peak position
Australian Albums (ARIA)	20
Austrian Albums (Ö3 Austria)	46
Belgian Albums (Ultratop Flanders)	72
Belgian Albums (Ultratop Wallonia)	57
Canadian Albums (Billboard)	16
Danish Albums (Hitlisten)	14
Dutch Albums (Album Top 100)	35
Finnish Albums (Suomen virallinen lista)	41
French Albums (SNEP)	88
German Albums (Offizielle Top 100)	67
Greek Albums (IFPI)	25
Norwegian Albums (VG-lista)	36
Swedish Albums (Sverigetopplistan)	40
UK Albums (OCC)	47
US Billboard 200	7
US Top Alternative Albums (Billboard)	2
US Top Rock Albums (Billboard)	3

=== Year-end charts ===
Chart (2010)	Position
US Billboard 200	126
US Top Rock Albums (Billboard)	34

== Certifications ==
Certifications for Broken Bells
Region	Certification	Certified units/sales
United States (RIAA)	Gold	500,000^{‡}
^{‡} Sales+streaming figures based on certification alone.

== Personnel ==
Broken Bells

- Brian Burton – organ, synthesizer, bass, piano, drums, programming, production
- James Mercer – bass, guitars, vocals

Additional personnel

- Margot Aldcroft – strings
- Jeff Antebi – artists and repertoire, artist development
- Peggy Baldwin – strings
- Alisha Bauer – strings
- Ruth Bruegger – strings
- Ronald Clark – strings
- Yvette Devereaux – strings
- Jacob Escobedo – artwork, design, layout
- Kirstin Fife – strings
- Stefanie Fife – strings
- Vanessa Freebairn-Smith – strings
- Ilona Geller – strings
- Neel Hammond – strings
- Kennie Takahashi – programming, engineer, mixing
- Peter Kent – strings
- Johana Krejci – strings
- Daniele Luppi – string conductor
- Stephen Marcussen – mastering engineer
- Miriam Mayer – strings
- Calabria McChesney – strings
- Todd Monfalcone – engineer, mixing assistant
- Michele Nardone – strings
- Frank W. Ockenfels – photography
- Carolyn Osborn – strings
- Anton Riehl – score preparation
- Christopher J. Tedesco – strings
- Philip Vaiman – strings
- Jessica van Velzen – strings
- Jennifer Walton – strings
- John Wittenberg – strings
- Alwyn Wright – strings
- Adriana Zoppo – strings
