= Occult Hymn =

EP by Danger Doom
- Released: 30 May 2006
- Genre: Hip-hop
- Length: 19:16
- Label: Adultswim.com
- Producers: Danger Mouse, Madlib

Danger Doom chronology
The Mouse and the Mask (2005)	Occult Hymn (2006)

MF Doom chronology
The Mouse and the Mask (2005)	Occult Hymn (2006)	Born Like This (2009)

Danger Mouse chronology
The Mouse and the Mask (2005)	Occult Hymn (2006)	St. Elsewhere (2006)

Professional ratings
Review scores
Source	Rating
Pitchfork Media	4.6/10
RapReviews	7.5/10

Occult Hymn is the only EP by Danger Doom, released in 2006 as the follow-up to their debut album, The Mouse and the Mask. It contains seven tracks and was released as a free download on Adult Swim's website on 30 May 2006. Its name is a reference to a line in Danger Doom's song "A.T.H.F.", and intentionally rhymes with "Adult Swim". The original EP contains two new tracks, three remixes, and two skits; on the re-release, two more new tracks were added.

== Track listing ==
No.	Title	Length
1.	"Skit 1" (featuring Master Shake from Aqua Teen Hunger Force)	1:11
2.	"El Chupa Nibre" (remix) (featuring characters from Squidbillies & the Sheriff)	2:46
3.	"Perfect Hair II" (featuring characters from Perfect Hair Forever)	2:17
4.	"Korn Dogz" (featuring characters from 12 oz. Mouse)	3:00
5.	"Skit 2" (featuring characters from Minoriteam)	3:17
6.	"Sofa King" (remix) (featuring characters from Aqua Teen Hunger Force)	2:50
7.	"Space Ho's" (Madlib remix)	3:50
8.	"Mad Nice" (featuring Vinny Price & Black Thought) (re-release bonus track)	3:11
9.	"Spokesman" (re-release bonus track)	2:26
