= Into the Blue (Broken Bells album) =

Studio album by Broken Bells
- Released: October 7, 2022
- Genre: Indie rock; trip hop
- Length: 41:20
- Label: AWAL
- Producer: Danger Mouse

Broken Bells chronology
After the Disco (2014)	Into the Blue (2022)

Singles from Into the Blue
- 1. "We're Not in Orbit Yet..." Released: June 29, 2022; 2. "Saturdays" Released: August 10, 2022; 3. "Love on the Run" Released: September 21, 2022

Into the Blue is the third studio album by American indie rock duo Broken Bells. It was released October 7, 2022, through AWAL.

== Background and recording ==
Broken Bells first started teasing new material in 2018, showing photos of the two recording in the studio and eventually releasing the non-album singles "Shelter" and "Good Luck". Into the Blue was the band's first studio album since 2014's After the Disco, marking the longest gap between studio albums to date.

== Release ==
The album's first single, "We're Not in Orbit Yet..." was released June 29, 2022 to positive critical reception, with Stereogum writer Chris DeVille calling it "a bit like cosmic soul crossed with chamber-pop". A followup single, "Saturdays", was released August 10. Mxdwn.com writer Federico Cardenas said the first two singles "[show] both a great diversity in terms of songwriting and tone, while developing a clear theme in the style and aesthetic they intend to portray in Into the Blue." A third and final single, "Love on the Run", was released September 21.

== Critical reception ==
Into the Blue was met with generally favorable reviews from listeners and music critics. At Metacritic, which assigns a normalised rating out of 100 to reviews from mainstream publications, the album received an average score of 75, based on 7 reviews. Aggregator AnyDecentMusic? gave it 7.3 out of 10, based on their assessment of the critical consensus. In a favorable review for Mojo, Stevie Chicks said the album "finds their bond as strong as ever" and compared certain songs to the sounds of Isaac Hayes and the Beatles.

Professional ratings
Aggregate scores
Source	Rating
AnyDecentMusic?	7.3/10
Metacritic	75/100
Review scores
Source	Rating
AllMusic	3.5/5 stars
DIY	3.5/5 stars
Glide Magazine	4/5 stars
The Observer	4/5 stars
Mojo	4/5 stars
NME	3/5 stars
Uncut	7/10
XS Noize	9/10

== Track listing ==
All tracks are written by Brian Burton and James Mercer except where noted.

Into the Blue track listing
No.	Title	Writer(s)	Length
1.	"Into the Blue"	Brian Burton; James Mercer; Sam Cohen	5:33
2.	"We're Not in Orbit Yet..."		5:10
3.	"Invisible Exit"		2:33
4.	"Love on the Run"	Brian Burton; Dean Josiah Cover; James Mercer; Sam Cohen	7:03
5.	"One Night"		3:49
6.	"Saturdays"	Brian Burton; James Mercer; James Milne	3:07
7.	"Forgotten Boy"	Brian Burton; Emil Thielhelm; James Mercer; Michael Esposito; Ralph Scala; Ronald Gilbert	3:44
8.	"The Chase"		5:29
9.	"Fade Away"		4:46
Total length:			41:20

== Personnel ==
Broken Bells

- James Mercer
- Danger Mouse

Production

- Danger Mouse

== Charts ==
Chart performance for Into the Blue
Chart (2022)	Peak position
Australian Digital Albums (ARIA)	43
Scottish Albums (OCC)	66
Swiss Albums (Schweizer Hitparade)	51
UK Album Downloads (OCC)	22
UK Independent Albums (OCC)	19
