= Holding On for Life =

Single by Broken Bells

from the album After the Disco
- Released: November 21, 2013
- Recorded: 2012–13
- Genre: Neo-psychedelia; dream pop; synthpop
- Length: 3:56
- Label: Columbia
- Songwriters: James Mercer; Brian Burton
- Producer: Danger Mouse

Broken Bells singles chronology
"Vaporize" (2011)	"Holding On for Life" (2013)	"After the Disco" (2014)

"Holding On for Life" is a song by American alternative rock band Broken Bells. Written by band members James Mercer and Brian Burton and produced by the latter, the song was originally recorded for the band's second studio album, After the Disco, on which it appears as the third track. It was released as the album's lead single on November 21, 2013. The song is featured in the soundtrack for the video game MLB 14: The Show.

== Reception ==
Kory Grow of Rolling Stone described the song as "a Bee Gees-like indie-disco number," a sentiment also expressed by NPR's Bob Boilen, who wrote that he "heard Bee Gees in something like this." In an interview with Boilen, Danger Mouse concurred with this comparison, saying, "It sounded kind of like the Bee Gees a little bit, but so what? The Bee Gees had some good choruses."

== Music video ==
A music video for the song was directed by Jacob Gentry, and stars Kate Mara and Anton Yelchin. The video serves as a sequel to the previously released video for the song "Angel and the Fool", also from After the Disco.

== Charts ==
=== Weekly charts ===
Chart (2014)	Peak position
Australia (ARIA Hitseekers)	16
Belgium (Ultratip Bubbling Under Flanders)	3
Belgium (Ultratip Bubbling Under Wallonia)	30
Canada Rock (Billboard)	41
CIS Airplay (TopHit)	197
US Hot Rock & Alternative Songs (Billboard)	22
US Rock & Alternative Airplay (Billboard)	27
US Adult Alternative Airplay (Billboard)	2
US Alternative Airplay (Billboard)	16
US Hot Singles Sales (Billboard)	9

=== Year-end charts ===
Chart (2014)	Position
US Hot Rock Songs (Billboard)	92
US Adult Alternative Songs (Billboard)	16
