= Danger Doom =

American hip-hop group

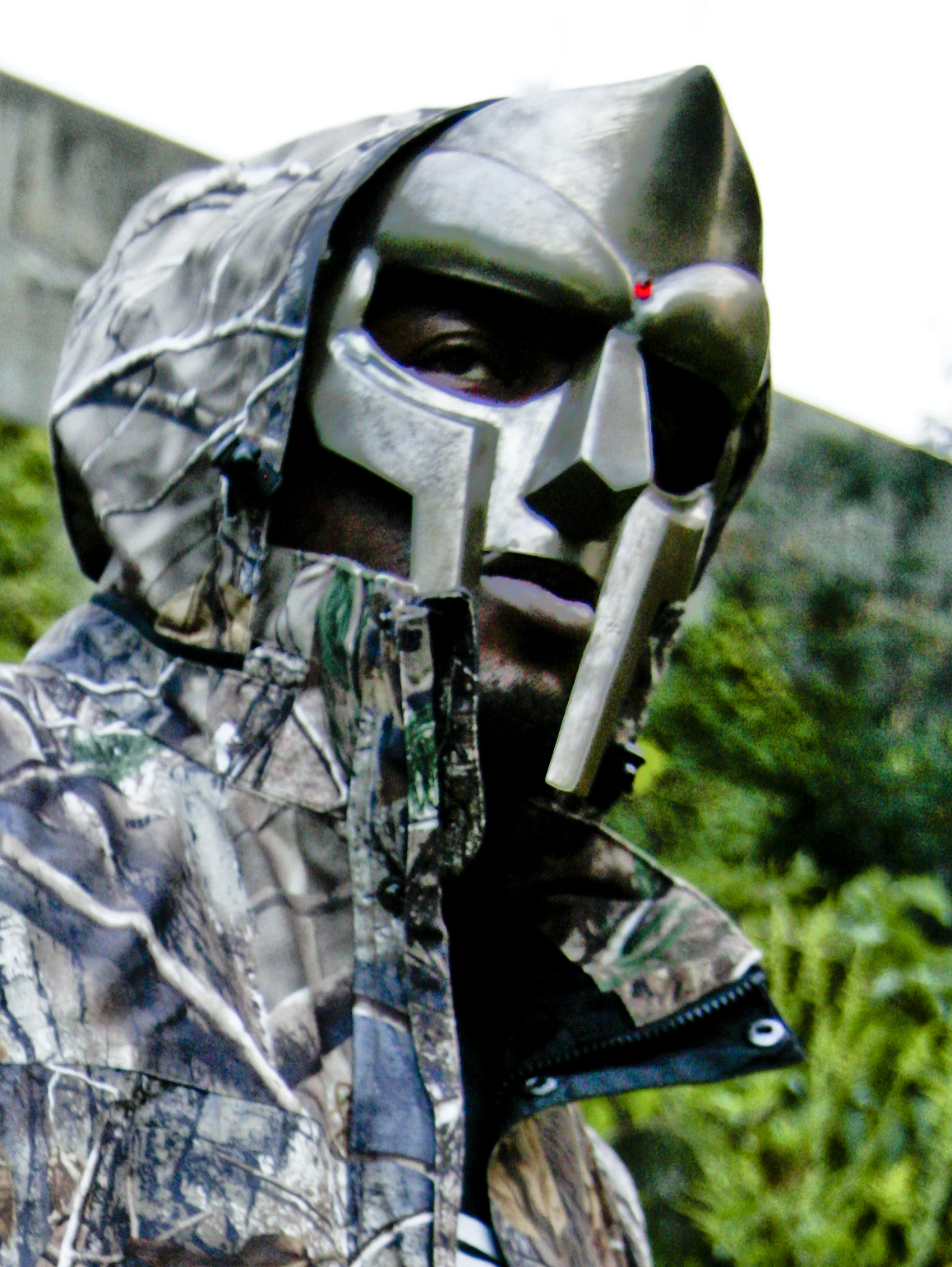
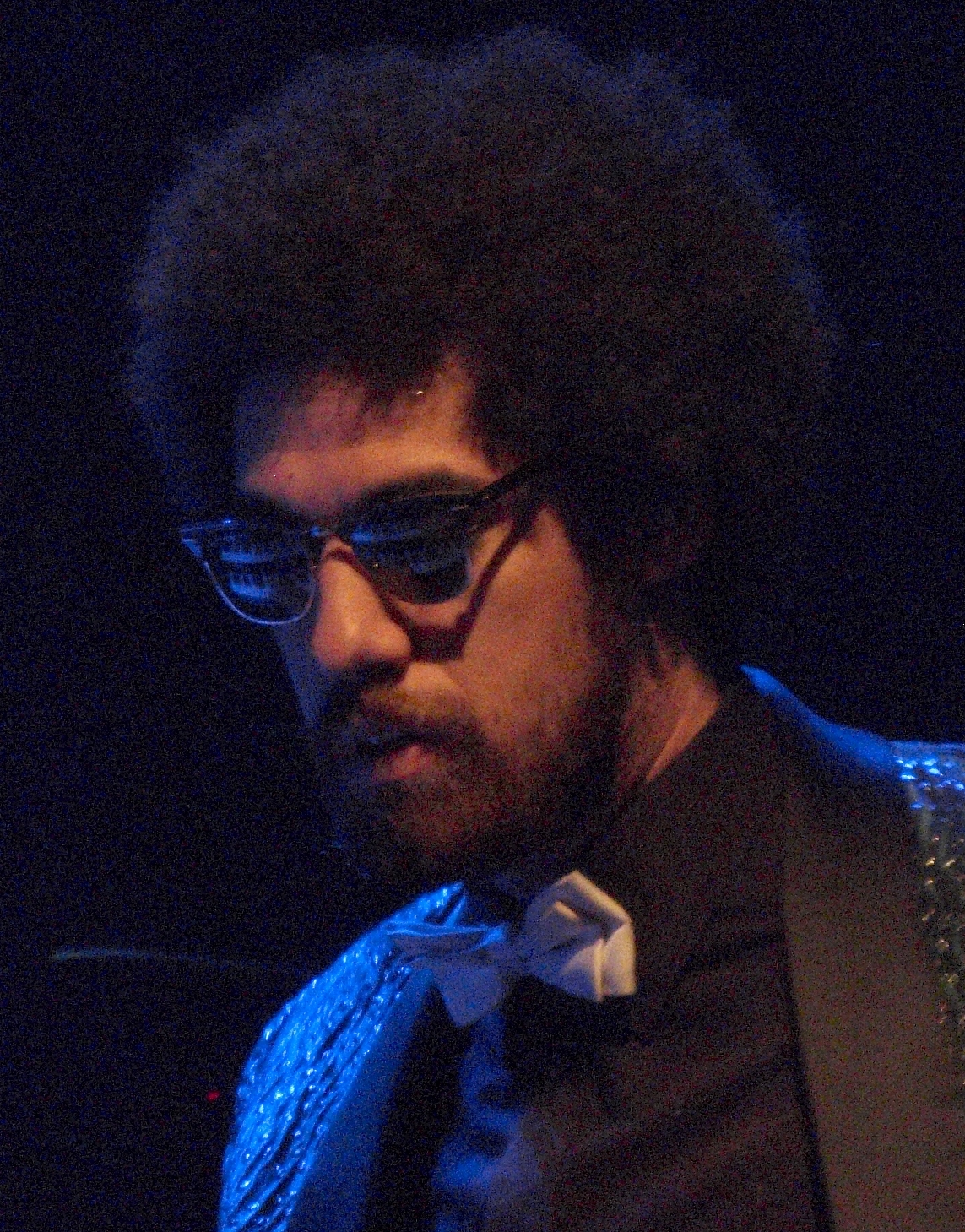
- MF Doom Danger Mouse

Background information
- Also known as: DANGERDOOM
- Origin: United States
- Genres: Hip-hop, underground hip-hop, alternative hip hop
- Years active: 2004–2006
- Labels: Epitaph; Lex; Waxploitation; Metalface
- Past members: Danger Mouse; MF Doom

Danger Doom (stylized as DANGERDOOM) was an American hip-hop supergroup composed of producer Danger Mouse and rapper MF Doom. The project was a collaboration with the Cartoon Network programming block Adult Swim. Their debut album, The Mouse and the Mask, was released in 2005 and integrated characters from animated series such as Aqua Teen Hunger Force, Sealab 2021, and Harvey Birdman, Attorney at Law.

== Background ==
Danger Mouse and MF Doom had previously collaborated on "Social Distortion" from Prince Po's The Slickness, Danger Mouse's remix of Zero 7's "Somersault", and the track "November Has Come" from Gorillaz' second studio album, Demon Days.

The Danger Doom project was initiated by Jason DeMarco, the creative director of Adult Swim. DeMarco, a fan of both artists, approached Danger Mouse with the concept of an album that utilized the network's sound archives. Danger Mouse agreed on the condition that he could recruit MF Doom for the vocals. The project was fully funded by Adult Swim to promote their fall 2005 programming schedule.

== The Mouse and the Mask (2005) ==
The duo recorded The Mouse and the Mask throughout 2005. Unlike traditional sampling methods, the voice work on the album was recorded specifically for the songs. Voice actors such as Dana Snyder (Master Shake), Dave Willis (Meatwad/Carl), and George Lowe (Space Ghost) recorded dialogue that interacted directly with Doom's lyrics.

The album featured guest appearances from Ghostface Killah, Talib Kweli, and Money Mark. The track "Benzi Box" featured CeeLo Green, with whom Danger Mouse would form the soul duo of Gnarls Barkley later that year.

The Mouse and the Mask was released on October 11, 2005, via Epitaph Records in the United States and Lex Records in the United Kingdom. It was supported by a marketing campaign on Cartoon Network featuring music videos and animated shorts.

== Occult Hymn and hiatus (2006–2010) ==
On May 30, 2006, the group released a follow-up EP, Occult Hymn, exclusively as a free digital download on the Adult Swim website. The seven-track collection included new songs such as "Korn Dogz" and remixes of tracks from the debut album.

Following the EP, the group entered an indefinite hiatus. Danger Mouse focused on the commercial success of Gnarls Barkley's St. Elsewhere and production work for The Black Keys and Beck. MF Doom continued his solo work and other collaborations. MF Doom had stated that he hoped there would be a second Danger Doom album in which he would "rap from the perspective of the cartoons and in their voices, rather than simply create stories around them". Danger Mouse was also slated to reunite with MF Doom in 2008, though ultimately no reunion projects occurred before MF Doom's death in 2020.

== Musical style and themes ==
Danger Doom's music is characterized by satiricial lyricism and up-tempo production. Danger Mouse's production utilized orchestral loops and cleaner mixing than the gritty, lo-fi aesthetic found on MF Doom's earlier releases like Operation: Doomsday.

Thematically, the album revolves around Adult Swim cartoons. The album includes skits featuring the character Master Shake leaving angry voicemails for the group, complaining about his lack of screen time and unpaid royalties. Despite the comedic premise, critics noted that MF Doom maintained his signature dense rhyme schemes and abstract wordplay.

== Reception and legacy ==
The Mouse and the Mask received generally favorable reviews. On Metacritic, it holds a score of 81 out of 100 based on 28 reviews. Entertainment Weekly called it "a hip-hop tour de farce." However, some critics felt the "cartoon gimmick" prevented the album from reaching the artistic heights of Madvillainy. Spin noted that while the album was entertaining, it was "strictly for the dorm room."

Commercially, the album was a success for the independent sector, peaking at number 41 on the US Billboard 200 and number 2 on the Top Independent Albums chart. The group was awarded Hip-Hop Album of the Year by PLUG Independent Music Awards for their album The Mouse and the Mask.

=== Reissues and posthumous works ===
In May 2017, MF Doom's label, Metalface Records, released The Mouse and the Mask: Metalface Edition. This deluxe vinyl reissue included the full original album, the Occult Hymn EP, and previously unreleased tracks "Spokesman" and "Mad Nice" featuring Black Thought.

Following MF Doom's death in October 2020, Danger Mouse released the album Cheat Codes (2022) with Black Thought. The track "Belize" featured a posthumous verse from MF Doom, reuniting the producer and rapper.

== Discography ==
=== Studio albums ===
Title	Album details	US	US R&B	US Ind.
The Mouse and the Mask	Released: October 11, 2005; Label: Epitaph, Lex; Format: CD, LP, digital download	41	31	2

=== EPs ===
Title	Album details
Occult Hymn	Released: May 30, 2006; Label: Adult Swim; Format: Digital download

=== Singles ===
Title	Release date	Album
"Sofa King"	November 4, 2005	The Mouse and The Mask
"Old School"	July 10, 2006	The Mouse and The Mask
