= James Mercer (musician) =

American singer-songwriter (born 1970)

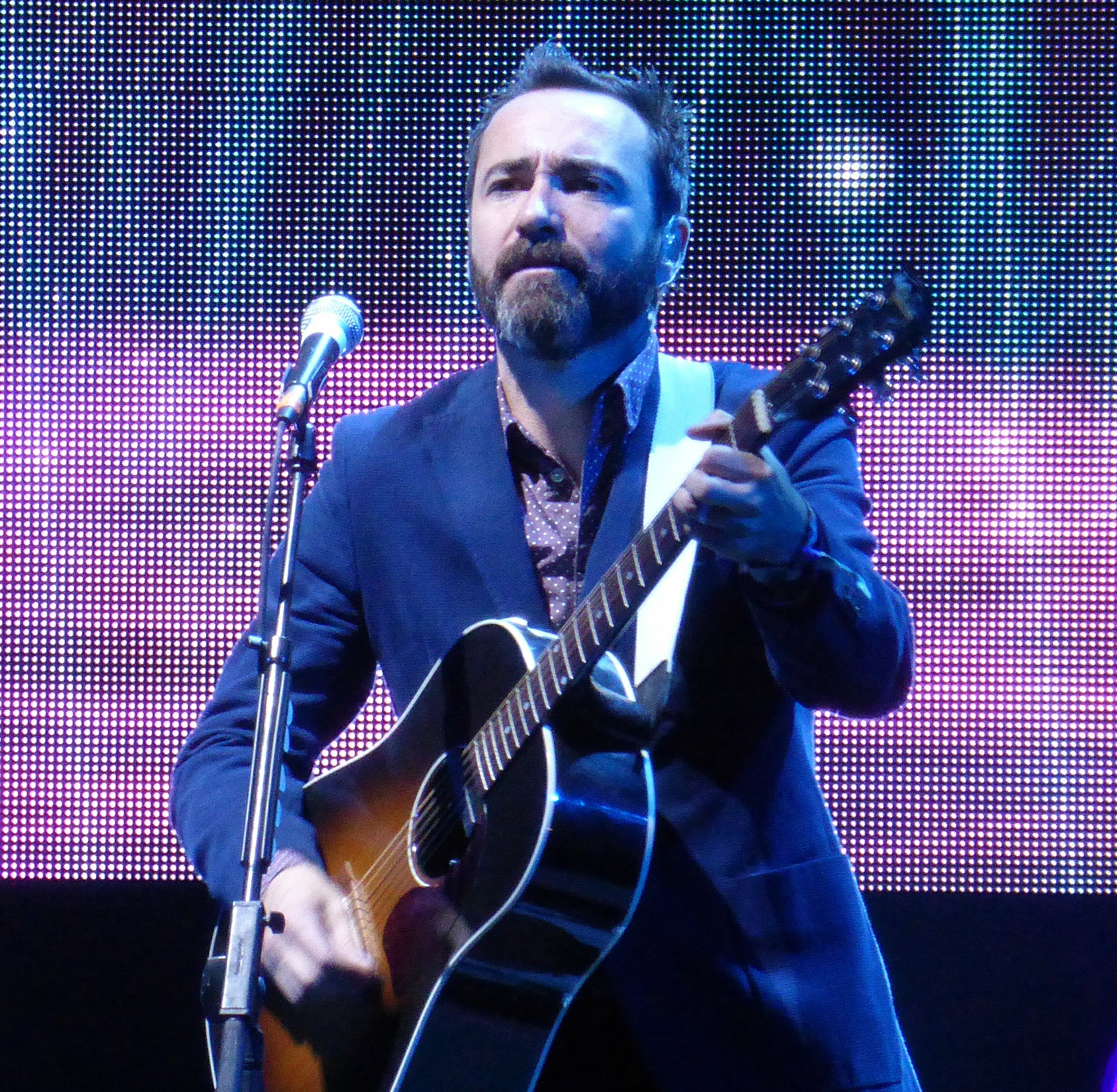
- James Mercer performing in 2014

Background information
- Born: James Russell Mercer; December 26, 1970 (age 55); Honolulu, Hawaii, U.S.
- Origin: Albuquerque, New Mexico, U.S.
- Genres: Indie rock; indie pop
- Occupations: Singer; songwriter; musician
- Instruments: Vocals; guitar; bass; piano; keyboards
- Years active: 1991–present
- Labels: Sub Pop; Transgressive
- Member of: The Shins; Broken Bells
- Formerly of: Flake Music; Blue Roof Dinner
- Spouse: Marisa Kula (m. 2006)
- Website: theshins.com www.brokenbells.com

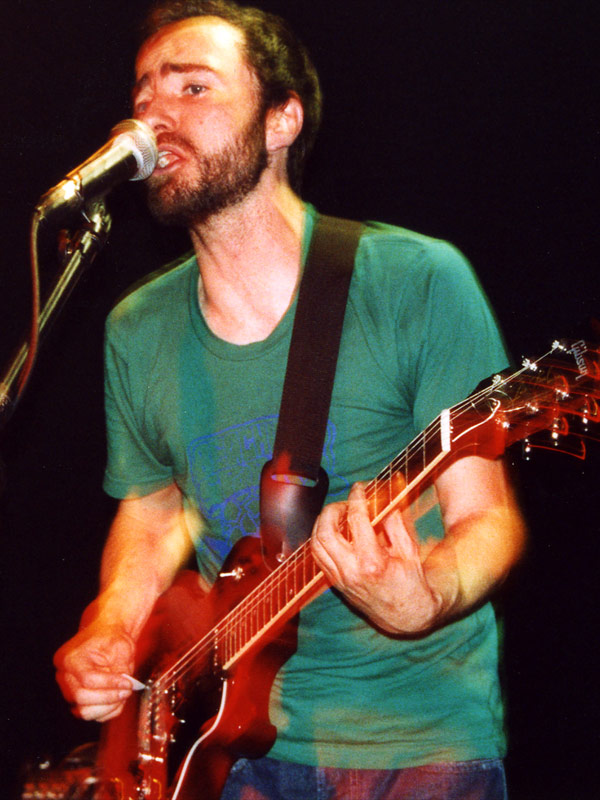
Mercer in 2004

James Russell Mercer (born December 26, 1970) is an American singer-songwriter and musician. He is the founder, vocalist, lead songwriter, and sole remaining original member of the indie rock group The Shins. In 2009, Mercer and producer Danger Mouse formed the side project Broken Bells, for which they released a self-titled album in March 2010, followed by After the Disco in 2014, and then Into the Blue in 2022. Mercer also has acted, appearing in Matt McCormick's feature film Some Days Are Better Than Others, which premiered in 2010.

== Early life ==
Born in Honolulu, Hawaii, Mercer was raised Roman Catholic but he became an atheist at age 10. His father was in the United States Air Force and was a nuclear weapons specialist. Because of his father's deployments, he attended high school in both England and Germany; he lived in England from 1985 to 1990. According to Mercer: "You know, my dad was a musician. He would [sing] in country western acts in nightclubs and things. And so, I grew up hearing a lot of music and seeing my father perform in the house and stuff." He attended the University of New Mexico and studied chemistry for a time before dropping out, saying that although he enjoyed the subject matter, he was not cut out for it because his head was "too in the clouds for stuff like that."

== Career ==
In the early 1990s, Mercer belonged to a group called Scared of Chaka where he played drums. Soon after he joined Blue Roof Dinner. In 1992, Mercer founded the band Flake Music (originally called Flake) with drummer Jesse Sandoval, keyboardist Marty Crandall, and bassist Neal Langford. Together they produced the well-received album When You Land Here, It's Time to Return touring with Modest Mouse and Califone.

Shortly after the release of When You Land Here, in 1996, Mercer formed The Shins in Albuquerque as a side project. Mercer named the band The Shins after the family in the musical The Music Man, a favorite of Mercer's father. The project began as a way to explore three-minute pop songs with conventional chord structure. Mercer recruited Sandoval to play drums and the two began performing as a duo. The Shins played with Cibo Matto and the American Analog Set with Mercer serving as the primary songwriter for the band. As The Shins rose to popularity, Flake Music eventually disbanded in 1999, leaving Mercer, Sandoval, and Langford, who joined after Flake Music's disbanding to focus completely on The Shins. In 2002, the band relocated to Portland, Oregon.

In 2007, Mercer sang backup vocals on the tracks "Florida," "Missed the Boat," and "We've Got Everything" on Modest Mouse's album We Were Dead Before the Ship Even Sank. Mercer has been credited with playing several instruments on The Shins' albums including guitar, bass, synthesizer, ukulele, banjo, harmonium, and percussion as well as beat and MIDI programming.

Mercer began collaborating with Danger Mouse in 2005 when he performed on the song "Insane Lullaby" featured on the Danger Mouse/Sparklehorse album Dark Night of the Soul, not released officially until July 2010. After working together on the album in September 2009, Mercer and Danger Mouse announced a new project called Broken Bells and on March 9, 2010 released their debut self-titled album, Broken Bells. They also released a second album together on February 4, 2014, titled After the Disco, and a third album on October 7th, 2022, titled Into the Blue.

In 2010, Mercer acted in Matt McCormick's feature film Some Days Are Better Than Others, playing the role of Eli, a directionless slacker. The film premiered at the 2010 SXSW Film and Music Festival. Also, in 2010, Mercer and Modest Mouse frontman Isaac Brock contributed original music to director Chris Malloy's 180° South, a documentary about adventurers in Patagonia. Mercer contributed two songs to the documentary and one was a cover of Neil Young's "Journey Through the Past."

== Musical style and influences ==
Musical influences he has mentioned include The Smiths, The Cure, Echo & the Bunnymen, The Beatles and Orchestral Manoeuvres in the Dark (OMD).

Mercer is known to play a worn yellow Gibson Les Paul Double cut faded and a Gibson J-45.

With Broken Bells, Mercer has mostly been seen using a Vox Wildcat.

== Personal life ==
Mercer married designer and home decorator Marisa Kula in April 2006 in a small ceremony on Waimānalo Beach in Hawaii, where Kula was born and raised. They had met when Kula, then a journalist, was assigned to interview Mercer for a story. They have three daughters together.
