= Danger Mouse (musician) =

American musician and producer (born 1977)

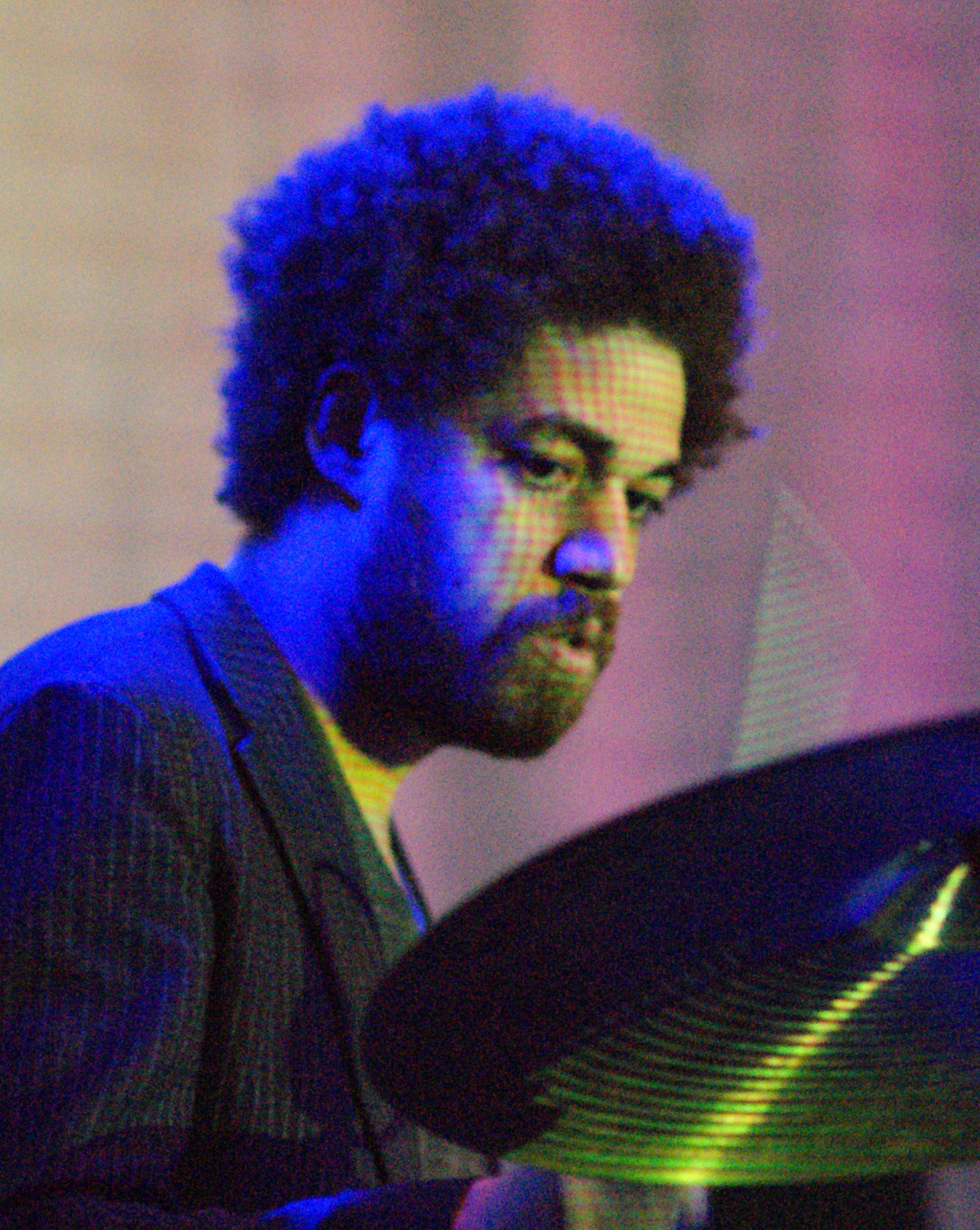
- Danger Mouse performing with Broken Bells in 2010

Background information
- Born: Brian Joseph Burton; July 29, 1977 (age 49); White Plains, New York, U.S.
- Genres: Trip hop; hip-hop; alternative rock; electronica
- Occupations: Musician; record producer; songwriter
- Instruments: Keyboards; bass; drums; percussion; guitar
- Years active: 1998–present
- Labels: 30th Century; BMG; Capitol; Lex Records; Parlophone
- Member of: Broken Bells
- Formerly of: Gnarls Barkley; Danger Doom

Brian Joseph Burton (born July 29, 1977), known professionally as Danger Mouse, is an American musician and record producer. He has been nominated for 22 Grammy Awards and has won six. He has been nominated in the Producer of the Year category five times, and won the award in 2011. In 2008, Esquire named him one of the "75 most influential people of the 21st century".

Danger Mouse came to prominence in 2004 when he released The Grey Album, which combined vocal performances from Jay-Z's The Black Album with instrumentals from the Beatles' The Beatles, also known as The White Album. He formed Gnarls Barkley with CeeLo Green in 2006 and produced its albums St. Elsewhere, The Odd Couple and Atlanta. In 2009, he collaborated with James Mercer of the indie rock band The Shins to form the band Broken Bells; the band released three albums since then, with Into the Blue (2022) being the most recent one. Burton collaborated with rapper MF Doom as Danger Doom on The Mouse and the Mask, with emcee Black Thought on Cheat Codes, and with singer Karen O on Lux Prima.

Danger Mouse produced the second Gorillaz album (2005's Demon Days), Beck's 2008 record Modern Guilt, and four albums with The Black Keys (Attack & Release, Brothers, El Camino, and Turn Blue). In 2016, he produced, performed on, and co-wrote songs for the eleventh studio album by the Red Hot Chili Peppers titled The Getaway. He has produced and co-written albums by Norah Jones (Little Broken Hearts), Electric Guest (Mondo), Portugal. The Man (Evil Friends), Adele (25), and ASAP Rocky (At.Long.Last.ASAP).

== Early life and music career ==
Brian Joseph Burton was born on July 29, 1977 in White Plains, New York. He grew up in Spring Valley, New York. Burton moved to Stone Mountain, Georgia, a suburb of Atlanta, where he attended and graduated from Redan High School. He lived in Athens, Georgia, where he pursued a degree in telecommunications at the University of Georgia on scholarship, and where his trip hop works (The Chilling Effect (1999), Rhode Island (2000), and Pelican City / Scanner – Pelican City vs. Scanner (2002)) were released while he was a student. While at the University of Georgia he was introduced to Nirvana, Pink Floyd, and Portishead, and came to know the indie rock scene in Athens, remixed work by several local artists, including Neutral Milk Hotel, and DJ'd for University of Georgia radio station WUOG-FM.

== Music career ==
=== 1998–2004 ===
While in Athens, Burton took second place in a 1998 talent contest and was asked to open for a concert at the University of Georgia featuring OutKast and Goodie Mob. Afterwards, Burton says he approached CeeLo Green, a member of Goodie Mob, and gave him an instrumental demo tape. He suggested and negotiated CeeLo's appearance on the 26' Remix of the Danger Mouse and Jemini record. When Burton met CeeLo for this project, he shared some beats which led them to collaborate as Gnarls Barkley.

From 1998 to 2003, Burton created a series of remix CDs and records under the stage name Danger Mouse. He performed in a mouse outfit because he was too shy to show his face, and took his name from the English cartoon series Danger Mouse.

Burton moved to Britain for a couple of years, living in New Cross in London and working at the Rose pub near London Bridge. While there, he sent a demo to Lex Records, which signed him. Burton relocated to Los Angeles; his first original releases under the name Danger Mouse were his collaborations with rapper Jemini, including the album Ghetto Pop Life, released in 2003 on Lex Records. The Danger Mouse debut was well received by critics, but he did not rise to fame until he created The Grey Album, mixing a cappella versions of Jay-Z's The Black Album over beats crafted from samples of the Beatles' eponymous album, also known as The White Album. The remix album, originally created just for his friends, spread over the Internet and became very popular with both the general audience and critics, with Rolling Stone calling it the ultimate remix record and Entertainment Weekly ranking it the best record of that year. He discussed his feelings about any controversy the album may have created in the documentary Alternative Freedom. Danger Mouse was named among the Men of the Year by GQ in 2004 and won a 2005 Wired Rave Award.

=== 2004–2007 ===
The Grey Album got the attention of Damon Albarn, who enlisted Danger Mouse to produce Gorillaz' second studio album, Demon Days. Demon Days earned Burton a Grammy Award nomination for Producer of the Year.

Danger Mouse's next project was The Mouse and the Mask, a collaboration with MF Doom (as Danger Doom) about and for Cartoon Network's Adult Swim. The two had previously collaborated on the Danger Mouse remix of Zero 7's "Somersault", on the Prince Po track "Social Distortion", and on Gorillaz' "November Has Come". A year later, Danger Doom released a follow-up EP called Occult Hymn. The 7-track EP features new songs, and remixes from The Mouse & The Mask, and was released as a free download on Adult Swim's site.

In 2006, Danger Mouse and CeeLo as Gnarls Barkley released their first album, St. Elsewhere, which includes the international hit single "Crazy". "Crazy" became the first UK number-one single based solely on downloads. Gnarls Barkley set out on tour and was one of the main opening acts on the Red Hot Chili Peppers' Stadium Arcadium World Tour. The Gnarls Barkley touring lineup featured future Chili Peppers guitarist, Josh Klinghoffer. He produced two tracks on The Rapture's 2006 album Pieces of the People We Love. In the autumn of 2006, Sparklehorse released his fourth album, Dreamt for Light Years in the Belly of a Mountain, a collaboration with Danger Mouse and Steven Drozd of The Flaming Lips. In August and September 2006, Danger Mouse collaborated with British graffiti artist Banksy to replace 500 copies of Paris Hilton's album Paris in British music stores with altered album artwork and a 40-minute instrumental song containing various statements she had made.

=== 2007–present ===
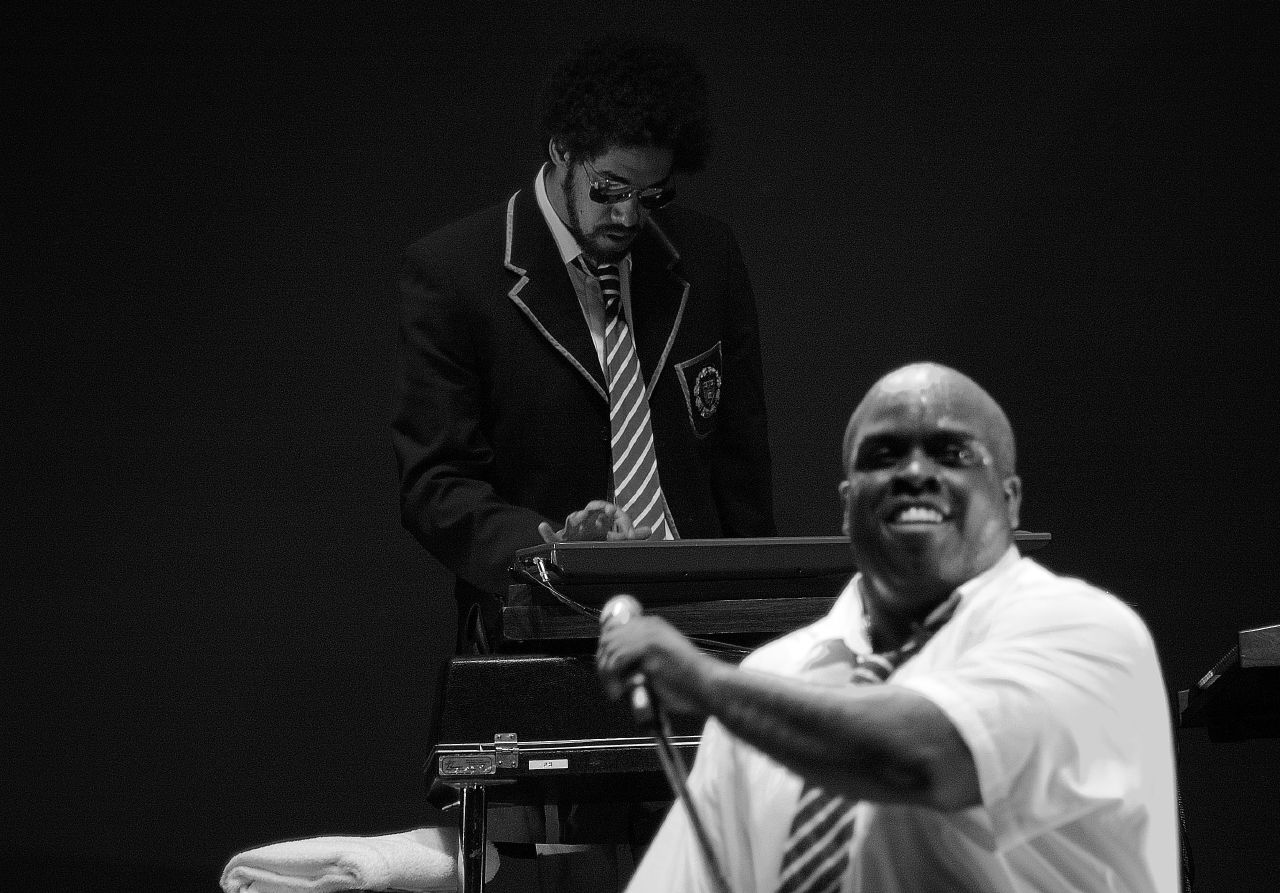
Danger Mouse and CeeLo Green performed as Gnarls Barkley in 2007.

In January 2007, Danger Mouse produced another collaboration with Damon Albarn on The Good, the Bad & the Queen, along with The Clash bassist Paul Simonon, former The Verve guitarist Simon Tong and afrobeat pioneer and Africa 70 drummer Tony Allen.

In March 2008, The Odd Couple, the second album of his and CeeLo Green's Gnarls Barkley project, was released. In May 2008, an album with Martina Topley-Bird, titled The Blue God, was released. Topley-Bird collaborated on "All Alone", one song on the Danger Mouse produced Gorillaz second LP, Demon Days. Also released in May 2008 was Replica Sun Machine, an album with the band The Shortwave Set, including a collaboration with Van Dyke Parks and the Velvet Underground's John Cale, according to British music magazine New Musical Express.

Upcoming releases include a follow-up to Ghetto Pop Life entitled Kill Your Heroes. It was scheduled to be released in summer of 2006, but its release was pushed back to an undetermined date. He was also working on an album with The Black Keys and Ike Turner. Turner's death was expected to cancel the album, but The Black Keys and Danger Mouse released Attack & Release in April 2008. Some songs must have been recorded by Turner, however, as a posthumous Danger Mouse produced album has been mentioned, and another collaboration with MF Doom.

Danger Mouse produced and crafted beat structures with Beck for Beck's album Modern Guilt, which was released in July 2008. In April 2009, he and Helena Costas released an album as Joker's Daughter titled The Last Laugh. Danger Mouse was listed as one of Esquire's 75 most influential people of the 21st century.

Danger Mouse and Sparklehorse were due to release an album in the summer of 2009 entitled Danger Mouse and Sparklehorse Present: Dark Night of the Soul (together with a 100+ photo book with photographs by David Lynch). Due to a dispute with EMI the album was not released officially until July 12, 2010. However, the BBC reported that Danger Mouse planned to release a full illustrated jewel case with a blank CD-R included in it. The CD-R was to be labeled: "For Legal Reasons, enclosed CD-R contains no music. Use it as you will."

On November 8, 2009, Paste magazine named Danger Mouse the "Best Producer of the Decade (2000–2009)."

Together with James Mercer, Danger Mouse (billed by his real name, Brian Burton) formed Broken Bells on September 29, 2009. On December 21, 2009, the band released their debut single "The High Road", which was made available as a free download on their official site. The self-titled debut album was released in the U.S. on March 9, 2010.

In 2010, Danger Mouse began producing U2's thirteenth studio album Songs of Innocence, released in 2014. U2's frontman, Bono, said in 2010, "We have about 12 songs with him. At the moment that looks like the album we will put out next because it's just happening so easily." Ultimately, Danger Mouse was credited as co-producer on 7 of the album's 11 tracks, and sole producer on "Sleep Like a Baby Tonight" and "This Is Where You Can Reach Me Now". During this period, he produced the band's single "Ordinary Love", released in 2013 as part of the soundtrack to Mandela: Long Walk to Freedom, and their single "Invisible", which was released on Super Bowl Sunday, February 2, 2014.

In 2005, Danger Mouse began composing a "Spaghetti Western" album with composer Daniele Luppi and main vocalists Jack White and Norah Jones. Instrumentation was done mainly by musicians who played on the original Ennio Morricone scores. Danger Mouse does not play any instruments on the album. The style of the album reflects much of Danger Mouse's work since 2005, such as segments of Beck's Modern Guilt, aspects of Dark Night of the Soul, and songs like "Mongrel Heart" off of the self-titled Broken Bells album. The album was titled Rome and was released on May 16, 2011.

On February 13, 2011, Danger Mouse won a Grammy for Best Producer for his work on the Black Keys' Brothers, Broken Bells' self-titled album, and the Danger Mouse and Sparklehorse album Dark Night of the Soul.

On November 1, 2011, Los Angeles-based indie band Electric Guest released their first single, "Troubleman/American Daydream", produced by Danger Mouse. Danger Mouse produced the band's whole debut album Mondo which was released on April 24, 2012.

On May 1, 2012, Norah Jones released her Danger Mouse-produced fifth studio album Little Broken Hearts (Blue Note/EMI).

Danger Mouse co-wrote the song "Keep It for Your Own" by POP ETC.

Danger Mouse produced Portugal. The Man's seventh studio album, Evil Friends, released in June 2013.

Danger Mouse produced At.Long.Last.ASAP, the 2015 album by rapper ASAP Rocky.

In November 2015, Danger Mouse launched his own record label, 30th Century Records.

Danger Mouse was announced as the producer for the Red Hot Chili Peppers eleventh album and that he would replace Rick Rubin, the producer of the band's previous six albums dating back to 1991. Production began in February 2015. The production was halted due to an injury the band's bassist Flea suffered during a skiing trip. It resumed in August 2015 and continued into early 2016. The Getaway was released in June 2016 with Danger Mouse performing on and having co-writing credits on many of the songs.

In March 2017, Red Hot Chili Peppers singer Anthony Kiedis indicated that the band would likely want to work again with Danger Mouse on the follow-up to The Getaway. Kiedis stated "I think it's good to work with the same guy again to um, you know you had your freshman experience. I think we owe it to ourselves to start from the beginning with this guy and see what we can accomplish." However, their follow-up albums, 2022's Unlimited Love and Return of the Dream Canteen, featured the return of longtime producer Rick Rubin.

In April 2017, Danger Mouse released Resistance Radio: The Man in The High Castle, a compilation produced alongside 30th Century Records-signee producer Sam Cohen. Connected to Amazon's eponymous TV series, this album contains covers of 1960s classics by contemporary artists like Beck, Norah Jones, Kelis, Andrew VanWyngarden, The Shins, and more.

In June 2017, Portugal. The Man released Woodstock, their follow-up to 2013's Evil Friends; both of which featured production from Danger Mouse.

In June 2017, Danger Mouse collaborated with Run the Jewels and Big Boi to create the song "Chase Me" for the 2017 film Baby Driver.

In May 2018, Danger Mouse produced the acclaimed album Wide Awake! by Parquet Courts and in 2019 he collaborated with Karen O to create the album Lux Prima. The album has been met with generally favorable review by critics.

On August 12, 2022, Danger Mouse released a collaborative studio album Cheat Codes with The Roots emcee Black Thought. The same year, he released a third Broken Bells album with James Mercer, entitled Into the Blue.

On March 6, 2026, Danger Mouse and CeeLo Green reunited for the Gnarls Barkley project to release their third and final album, Atlanta.

== Philosophy ==
In an interview for The New York Times magazine, Danger Mouse compared himself to a film auteur, basing his music production philosophy on the cinematic philosophy of directors like Woody Allen. "Woody Allen was an auteur: he did his thing, and that particular thing was completely his own", he said. "That's what I decided to do with music. I want to create a director's role within music, which is what I tried to do on this album (St. Elsewhere)... I can create different kinds of musical worlds, but the artist needs the desire to go into that world... Musically, there is no one who has the career I want. That's why I have to use film directors as a model."

== Awards ==
Since 2005, Danger Mouse (as a producer and as an artist with Gnarls Barkley) has been nominated for 12 Grammy Awards: Producer of the Year (2005, 2006 and 2008), Record of Year (2006), Album of Year (2006), Best Alternative Album (2006 and 2008), Best Urban Alternative Performance (2006), Best Short Form Music Video (2007 and 2008) and Best Pop Performance (2008). He won two Grammy Awards in 2006 for Best Alternative Album and Best Urban Alternative Performance. He won in 2017 for his work as a producer on Adele's 25.

=== Grammy Awards ===
Year	Nominee / work	Award	Result
2006	Danger Mouse	Producer of the Year, Non-Classical	Nominated
2006	"Feel Good Inc."	Record of the Year	Nominated
2007	"Crazy"	Record of the Year	Nominated
2007	"Crazy"	Best Urban/Alternative Performance	Won
2007	St. Elsewhere	Album of the Year	Nominated
2007	St. Elsewhere	Best Alternative Music Album	Won
2007	Danger Mouse	Producer of the Year, Non-Classical	Nominated
2008	"Gone Daddy Gone"	Best Short Form Music Video	Nominated
2009	"Who's Gonna Save My Soul"	Best Short Form Music Video	Nominated
2009	"Going On"	Best Pop Performance by a Duo or Group with Vocals	Nominated
2009	The Odd Couple	Best Alternative Music Album	Nominated
2009	Danger Mouse	Producer of the Year, Non-Classical	Nominated
2011	Broken Bells	Best Alternative Music Album	Nominated
2011	Danger Mouse	Producer of the Year, Non-Classical	Won
2012	Danger Mouse	Producer of the Year, Non-Classical	Nominated
2013	El Camino	Album of the Year	Nominated
2013	El Camino	Best Rock Album	Won
2013	"Lonely Boy"	Record of the Year	Nominated
2013	"Lonely Boy"	Best Rock Song	Won
2015	"Fever"	Best Rock Song	Nominated
2017	25	Album of the Year	Won
2018	"Chase Me"	Best Rap Song	Nominated
2020	"Woman"	Best Rock Performance	Nominated
2021	Kiwanuka	Best Rock Album	Nominated

=== Other awards ===
- 2004 Entertainment Weekly's Album of the Year (Danger Mouse – The Grey Album)
- 2004 GQ Magazine's "Men of the Year"
- 2005 Wired Magazine's Rave Award (Music)
- 2005 Q – Best Producer
- 2006 Entertainment Weekly's Album of the Year (Gnarls Barkley – St. Elsewhere)
- 2006 Q (Song of the Year – Gnarls Barkley's "Crazy")
- 2008 Rolling Stone – Best Producer in Rock
- 2009 Esquire – 75 Most Influential People of the 21st Century
- 2009 GQ Magazine's Album of the Year (Danger Mouse & Sparklehorse – Dark Night of the Soul)
- 2009 Paste – Producer of the Decade
- 2010 Rolling Stone – Song of the Decade (Gnarls Barkley – "Crazy")
- 2013 Music Producers Guild – International Producer of the Year
- 2014 71st Golden Globe Awards (winner) (Best Original Song – "Ordinary Love")
- 2016 74th Golden Globe Awards (nominee) (Best Original Song – "Gold")
- 2023 Berlin Music Video Awards (nominee) (Best Low Budget - Strangers)
