= The Good, the Bad & the Queen discography =

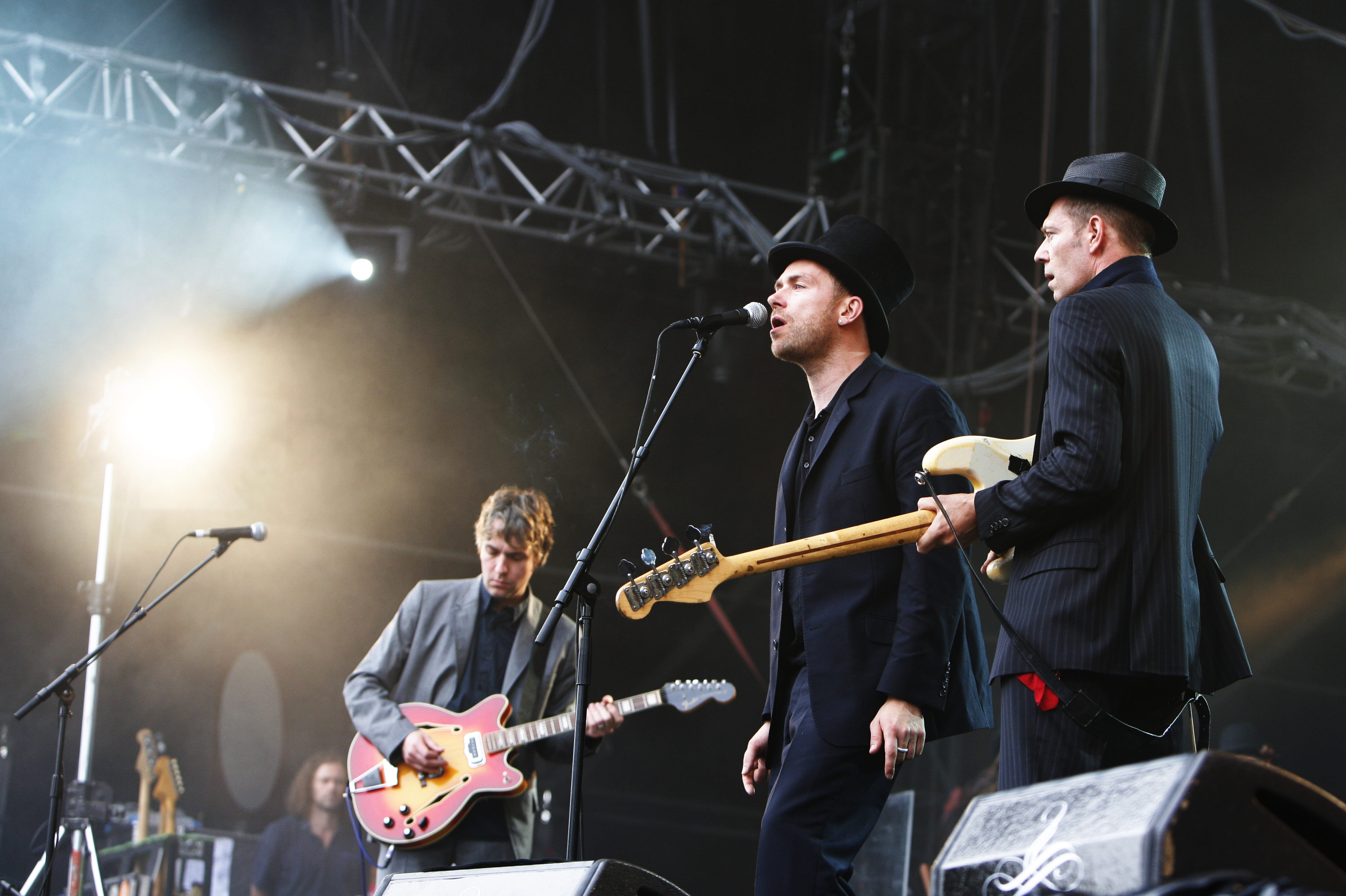
- The Good, the Bad & the Queen performing at Eurockéennes 2007
- Studio albums: 2
- EPs: 1
- Singles: 5
- Music videos: 4
- Box sets: 1
- Promotional music videos: 10

The discography of The Good, the Bad & the Queen, a British art rock supergroup formed in London in 2005. The group consisted of vocalist and instrumentalist Damon Albarn, bassist Paul Simonon, guitarist Simon Tong, and drummer Tony Allen. Consists of two studio albums, an extended play, five singles, a box set, four music videos and ten promotional music videos.

The members of the band had already worked in notorious bands, including Albarn (Blur's vocalist and co-creator of Gorillaz), Simonon (The Clash's bassist), Tong (The Verve's guitarist) and Allen (Fela Kuti's drummer). The Good, the Bad & the Queen has released two studio albums, The Good, the Bad & the Queen (2007) and Merrie Land (2018).

== Albums ==
=== Studio albums ===
List of studio albums, with selected chart positions, sales figures and certifications
Title	Album details	Peak chart positions										Certifications
Title	Album details	UK	AUT	BEL	GER	FRA	IRL	NLD	SCO	SWI	US	Certifications
The Good, the Bad & the Queen	Released: 22 January 2007; Label: Parlophone, Honest Jon's, EMI, Virgin; Formats: CD, LP, cassette, digital download	2	13	18	8	10	5	29	2	7	49	BPI: Gold; SNEP: Gold
Merrie Land	Released: 16 November 2018; Label: Studio 13; Formats: CD, LP, digital download	31	41	55	62	75	35	105	26	30	— (Note: Merrie Land did not enter the US Billboard 200, but peaked at number 10 on the Tastemaker Albums Chart.)	
"—" denotes a recording that did not chart or was not released in that territory.

=== Extended plays ===
List of extended plays
Title	Extended play details
Live From SoHo (iTunes Exclusive EP)	Released: 3 April 2007; Label: Parlophone; Formats: CD, digital download

== Box sets ==
List of compilation box sets
Title	Box set details
Merrie Land	Released: 14 December 2018; Label: Studio 13; Formats: CD box set, LP box set, DVD box set

== Singles ==
List of singles, with selected chart positions and showing the album name
Title	Year	Peak chart positions					Album
Title	Year	UK	AUS Hit.	BEL	POL	SCO	Album
"Herculean"	2006	22	20	—	—	17	The Good, the Bad & the Queen
"Kingdom of Doom"	2007	20	—	—	35	7	The Good, the Bad & the Queen
"Green Fields"	2007	51	—	—	—	17	The Good, the Bad & the Queen
"Merrie Land"	2018	—	—	— (Note: "Merrie Land" did not enter the Flanders Ultratop Top 50, but charted as an extra tip on the Flanders Ultratop Bubbling Under chart.)	—	—	Merrie Land
"Gun to the Head"	2018	—	—	—	—	—	Merrie Land
"—" denotes a recording that did not chart or was not released in that territory.

== Music videos ==
List of music videos, showing year released, director and album name
Title	Year	Directed by	Album
"The Good, the Bad & the Queen"	2007	Stephen Pook	The Good, the Bad & the Queen
"Kingdom of Doom"	2007	The Good, the Bad & the Queen	The Good, the Bad & the Queen
"Nineteen Seventeen" (Live Video)	2019	Gautier & Leduc	—N/a
"The Truce of Twilight" (Performance Video)	2019	Paul Simonon	Merrie Land

=== Promotional music videos ===
All promotional music videos are directed by The Good, the Bad & the Queen and were released in 2018 in Merrie Land album.

- "Merrie Land"
- "Gun to the Head"
- "Nineteen Seventeen"
- "The Great Fire"
- "Lady Boston"
- "Drifters & Trawlers"
- "The Truce of Twilight"
- "Ribbons"
- "The Last Man to Leave"
- "The Poison Tree"

== See also ==
- Blur discography
- The Clash discography
- Damon Albarn discography
- Fela Kuti discography
- Gorillaz discography
- The Verve discography
