= Damon Albarn discography =

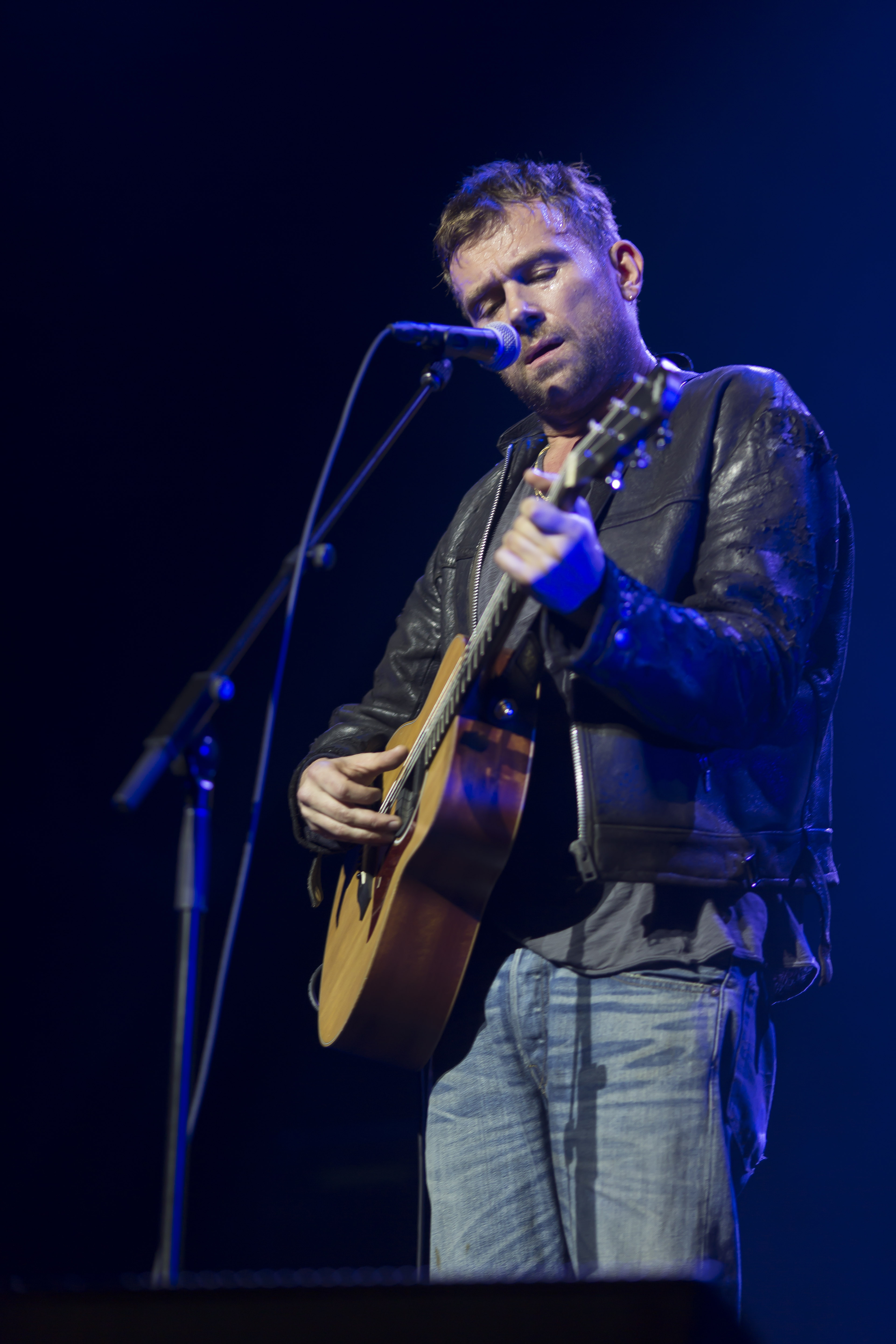
- Albarn performing at the Sydney Opera House in 2014
- Studio albums: 2
- Extended plays: 3
- Soundtrack albums: 5
- Live albums: 1
- Singles: 18
- Music videos: 4
- Collaboration albums: 4

The solo discography of British musician Damon Albarn consists of four collaboration albums, four soundtrack albums, three extended plays and twelve singles. Also included are releases by Albarn's various side-projects and groups such as Mali Music, The Good, the Bad and the Queen, Monkey, DRC Music and Rocket Juice & the Moon. Most of Albarn's work is either released by Honest Jon's Records (which is run by Albarn), Parlophone or EMI Records.

Since the late 1990s, Albarn began recording as a solo artist outside of Blur originally contributing music to film soundtracks such as Trainspotting (1996), Ravenous (1999), Ordinary Decent Criminal (2000) and 101 Reykjavík (2001). Aside from Gorillaz, Albarn has also recorded albums with various other side-projects and groups including Mali Music (2002) with Afel Bocoum, Toumani Diabaté and other Malian musicians, The Good, the Bad & the Queen with Tony Allen, Paul Simonon and Simon Tong, Kinshasa One Two (2011) as part of the collective DRC Music and Rocket Juice & the Moon (2012) with Tony Allen and Flea. Albarn has also composed the score for several theatre productions including Journey to the West (2008) recorded under the name Monkey and Dr Dee (2012).

== Albums ==
=== Solo albums ===
| Title | Details | Peak chart positions | | | | | | | | | | | Certifications (sales thresholds) |
| Title | Details | UK | AUS | AUT | DEN | FRA | GER | IRE | NZ | SCO | SWI | US | Certifications (sales thresholds) |
|---|---|---|---|---|---|---|---|---|---|---|---|---|---|
| Everyday Robots | Released: 28 April 2014; Label: Parlophone, Warner Bros.; Format(s): CD, LP, download | 2 | 26 | 12 | 4 | 6 | 7 | 3 | 15 | 2 | 6 | 32 | BPI: Silver |
| The Nearer the Fountain, More Pure the Stream Flows | Released: 12 November 2021; Label: Transgressive; Format(s): CD, LP, download | 7 | — | 37 | — | 15 | 35 | 24 | — | 5 | 20 | — | |

=== Live albums ===
List of albums, with selected details
| Title | Album details |
|---|---|
| Live at the De De De Der | Released: 15/16 November 2014; Label: Parlophone; Format: CD |

=== Collaboration albums ===
| Title | Details | Peak chart positions | Certifications (sales thresholds) |
| Title | Details | UK | Certifications (sales thresholds) |
|---|---|---|---|
| Mali Music (with Afel Bocoum, Toumani Diabaté & Friends) | Released: 15 April 2002; Label: Honest Jon's; Format(s): CD, download | 81 | |
| The Good, the Bad & the Queen (with Tony Allen, Paul Simonon & Simon Tong) | Released: 22 January 2007; Label: Parlophone, Honest Jon's; Format(s): CD, LP, download | 2 | BPI: Gold; SNEP: Silver |
| Kinshasa One Two (as DRC Music) | Released: 3 October 2011; Label: Warp; Format(s): CD, LP, download | — | |
| Rocket Juice & the Moon (with Tony Allen & Flea) | Released: 26 March 2012; Label: Honest Jon's; Format(s): CD, LP, download | 85 | |
| Maison Des Jeunes (as Africa Express) | Released: 9 December 2013; Label: Honest Jon's; Format(s): CD, LP, download | — | |
| Merrie Land (with Tony Allen, Paul Simonon & Simon Tong) | Released: 16 November 2018; Label: Studio 13; Format(s): CD, LP, download | 31 | |

=== Soundtracks ===
| Title | Details | Peak chart positions | |
| Title | Details | UK | IRE |
|---|---|---|---|
| Ravenous (with Michael Nyman) | Released: 9 March 1999; Label: EMI; Format(s): CD | — | — |
| 101 Reykjavík (with Einar Örn Benediktsson) | Released: 4 June 2001; Label: EMI; Format(s): CD | — | — |
| Journey to the West (as Monkey) | Released: 18 August 2008; Label: XL; Format(s): CD, LP, download | 5 | — |
| Dr Dee | Released: 8 May 2012; Label: Parlophone; Format(s): CD, download | 42 | 50 |
| Songs From Wonder.land (with Moira Buffini & Rufus Norris) | Released: 15 April 2016; Label: Parlophone; Format(s): CD, LP | — | — |

== EPs ==
- Democrazy (2003) (double-EP of demos)

== Singles ==
=== As lead artist ===
| Single | Year | Peak chart positions | Certifications (thresholds) | Album |
| Single | Year | UK | Certifications (thresholds) | Album |
|---|---|---|---|---|
| "Sunset Coming On" (as Mali Music) | 2002 | – | | Mali Music |
| "Herculean" (as the Good, the Bad & the Queen) | 2006 | 22 | | The Good, the Bad & the Queen |
| "Kingdom of Doom" (as the Good, the Bad & the Queen) | 2007 | 20 | | The Good, the Bad & the Queen |
| "Green Fields" (as the Good, the Bad & the Queen) | 2007 | 51 | | The Good, the Bad & the Queen |
| "Monkey Bee" (as Monkey) | 2008 | – | | Journey to the West |
| "Hallo" (as DRC Music) | 2011 | – | | Kinshasa One Two |
| "Manuela" (as Rocket Juice & the Moon featuring Erykah Badu) | 2012 | – | | Rocket Juice & the Moon |
| "Everyday Robots" | 2014 | – | | Everyday Robots |
| "Lonely Press Play" | 2014 | – | | Everyday Robots |
| "Hollow Ponds" | 2014 | – | | Everyday Robots |
| "Heavy Seas of Love" | 2014 | 70 | | Everyday Robots |
| "Mr. Tembo" (featuring the Leytonstone City Mission Choir) | 2014 | – | | Everyday Robots |
| "The Nearer the Fountain, More Pure the Stream Flows" | 2021 | – | | The Nearer the Fountain, More Pure the Stream Flows |
| "Polaris" | 2021 | – | | The Nearer the Fountain, More Pure the Stream Flows |
| "Particles" | 2021 | – | | The Nearer the Fountain, More Pure the Stream Flows |
| "Royal Morning Blue" | 2021 | – | | The Nearer the Fountain, More Pure the Stream Flows |
| "The Tower of Montevideo" | 2021 | – | | The Nearer the Fountain, More Pure the Stream Flows |

=== As featured artist ===
| Single | Year | Album |
|---|---|---|
| "Time Keeps on Slipping" (with Deltron 3030) | 2000 | Deltron 3030 |
| "Every Season" (with Tony Allen & Ty) | 2002 | HomeCooking |
| "FM" (with Nathan Haines) | 2003 | Squire for Hire |
| "Feel Free" (with Kano) | 2007 | London Town |
| "Repetition Kills You" (with The Black Ghosts) | 2008 | The Black Ghosts |
| "Saturday Come Slow" (Massive Attack) | 2010 | Heligoland |
| "Deep Blues" (with Kano) | 2016 | Made in the Manor |
| "Blu" (with Mura Masa) | 2017 | Mura Masa |
| "Perdu" (with Roméo Elvis) | 2019 | Chocolat |
| "Young Lies" (with Pote) | 2021 | A Tenuous Tale of Her |
| "Palaces" (with Flume) | 2022 | Palaces |
| "Nseraa" (with Fatoumata Diawara) | 2022 | London Ko |
| "Flags" (with Grian Chatten & Kae Tempest) | 2026 | Help(2) |

== Music videos ==
| Year | Song | Director(s) |
|---|---|---|
| 2007 | "Kingdom of Doom" (as The Good, the Bad & the Queen) | Giorgio Testi |
| 2008 | "Monkey Bee" (as Monkey) | Jamie Hewlett |
| 2011 | "Hallo" (as DRC Music) | |
| 2014 | "Everyday Robots" | Aitor Throup |
| 2014 | "Lonely Press Play" | Damon Albarn |
| 2014 | "Heavy Seas of Love" | Damon Albarn; Matt Cronin |
| 2014 | "Mr. Tembo" | Giorgio Testi |
| 2021 | "Royal Morning Blue" | Damon Albarn |

== Compilation appearances ==
- Trainspotting (1996) – "Closet Romantic"
- Random (1997) – "We Have a Technical" (with Matt Sharp)
- Ordinary Decent Criminal (2000) – "One Day at a Time" (with Robert Del Naja), "Kevin on a Motorbike", "Chase After Gallery", "Bank Job", "Dying Isn't Easy"
- This Is Where I Belong – The Songs of Ray Davies & The Kinks (2002) – "Waterloo Sunset" (with Ray Davies)
- Maestros of Cool: A Tribute to Steely Dan (2006) – "FM" (with Nathan Haines)
- Lucy (2014) – "Sister Rust"

== Guest appearances ==
- Elastica – Elastica (1995) (keyboard on "Car Song", "Indian Song" & "Waking Up")
- The Pretenders – The Isle of View (1995) (piano on "I Go to Sleep")
- Terry Hall – Rainbows EP (1995) (on "Chasing a Rainbow")
- Terry Hall – Laugh (1997) (on "A Room Full of Nothing")
- The Rentals – Seven More Minutes (2000) (on "Big Daddy C")
- Deltron 3030 – Deltron 3030 (2000) (on "State of the Nation")
- Elastica – The Menace (2000) (keyboard on "Da Da Da")
- Lovage – Music to Make Love to Your Old Lady By (2001) (on "Lovage (Love That Lovage, Baby)")
- Terry Hall & Mushtaq – The Hour of Two Lights (2002) (all over)
- Massive Attack – 100th Window (2003) (on "Small Time Shot Away")
- Fatboy Slim – Palookaville (2004) (on "Put It Back Together")
- Marianne Faithfull - Before the Poison (2004) (on "last song")
- Roots Manuva – Awfully De/EP (2005) (on "Awfully Deep (Lambeth Blues)")
- U-Cef – Halalwood (2008) (on "Stick")
- Eslam Jawaad – The Mammoth Tusk (2009) (on "Alarm Chord")
- Hypnotic Brass Ensemble – Hypnotic Brass Ensemble (2009) (synthesizer on "Rabbit Hop (Version)")
- Scratch – Loss 4 Wordz (2009) (on "Too Late")
- Massive Attack – Heligoland (2010) (on “Splitting the Atom”)
- Gil Scott-Heron – I'm New Here (2010) (keyboards on "Me and the Devil")
- Kano – Method to the Maadness (2010) (on "Bassment")
- Owiny Sigoma Band – Owiny Sigoma Band (2011)
- JJ Doom – Key to the Kuffs (2012) (on "Bite the Thong")
- Ghostigital – Division of Culture and Tourism (2012) (piano on "Numb")
- Deltron 3030 – Event 2 (2013) (on "What Is This Loneliness")
- Michael Horovitz – Bankbusted Nuclear Detergent Blues (piano on several songs)
- The Child of Lov – The Child of Lov (2013) (bass guitar on "Heal" and "One Day")
- Tony Allen – Film of Life (2014) (on "Go Back")
- De La Soul – And the Anonymous Nobody... (2016) (on "Here in After")
- Vince Staples – Big Fish Theory (2017) (on "Love Can Be...")
- Tony Allen – The Source (2017) (piano on "Cool Cats")
- Kali Uchis – Isolation (2018) (on "In My Dreams")
- Slingbaum – Slingbaum One (2020) (on "Morphine")
- Paul McCartney - McCartney III Imagined (2021) (on "Long Tailed Winter Bird")
- Joan as Police Woman, Tony Allen, Dave Okumu - The Solution is Restless (2021) (on "Get My Bearings")
- Bombay Bicycle Club - My Big Day (2023) (on "Heaven")
- Little Dragon - Slugs of Love (2023) (on "Glow")
- EarthGang - Perfect Fantasy (2024) (on "Godly")
- Kaktus Einarsson - Lobster Code (2024) (on "Gumbri")
- ASAP Rocky, Westside Gunn - Don't Be Dumb (2026) (on "Whiskey (Release Me)")

== Production discography ==
- Roots Manuva – Awfully De/EP (2005)
- Kano – London Town (2007)
- Abdel Hadi Halo – Abdel Hadi Halo & the El Gusto Orchestra of Algiers (2007)
- Amadou & Mariam – Welcome to Mali (2008)
- Bobby Womack – The Bravest Man in the Universe (2012)
- Damon Albarn – Everyday Robots (2014)
- Damon Albarn – The Nearer the Fountain, More Pure the Stream Flows (2021)
- Fatoumata Diawara - London Ko (2022)

== See also ==
- Blur discography
- The Good, the Bad & the Queen discography
- Gorillaz discography
- Graham Coxon discography
