= The Good, the Bad & the Queen (song) =

Song by The Good, the Bad & the Queen

from the album The Good, the Bad & the Queen
- Released: 22 January 2007
- Recorded: Studio 13: 5 October 2005
- Genre: Alternative rock
- Length: 7:00 (album version); 4:24 (live); 6:54 (video edit)
- Label: Parlophone, Honest Jon's
- Songwriter(s): Damon Albarn
- Producer(s): Danger Mouse

"The Good, the Bad & the Queen" is a song by British band the Good, the Bad & the Queen. It is the title song and final track on their 2007 debut album. A live version of the song recorded at the Tabernacle was also released as a B-side on the band's second single "Kingdom of Doom".

When the album was previewed by Uncut in November 2006, the magazine called the song "a surreal knees-up round a knackered old joanna that celebrates how the same sun cheers both Queen and crackheads - before building up to a psychotic guitar wig-out." Damon Albarn told NME in January 2007 that the song "had to be last" referring to the position in the album because "where do you go after that noisy bit at the end?"

In May 2007, the band posted an official video linked from YouTube for the song on their MySpace blog. This so-called "Sufi Video" was directed by Stephen Pook.
