= Before the Poison =

Studio album by Marianne Faithfull
- Released: 28 September 2004
- Recorded: June–October, 2003; The Fallout Shelter and Mayfair, London
- Genres: Rock, alternative rock
- Label: Anti-/Naïve
- Producers: PJ Harvey; Nick Cave; Hal Willner; Rob Ellis; Head

Marianne Faithfull chronology
Kissin Time (2003)	Before the Poison (2004)	Easy Come, Easy Go (2008)

Before the Poison is the sixteenth studio album by the English singer Marianne Faithfull, recorded in 2003 and released in France on 28 September 2004, and in the United States on 25 January 2005.

== Overview ==
The album has a dark and fatalistic mood, which Faithfull attributes partially to the post-9/11 world.

Faithfull enlisted musicians PJ Harvey and Nick Cave, as well as Damon Albarn and producer Jon Brion, with whom she had collaborated on her previous release, Kissin Time.

- Besides producing and performing on five tracks, Harvey gave her three songs ("The Mystery of Love", "My Friends Have" and "No Child of Mine"—an excerpt of the last one appears on Harvey's album, Uh Huh Her) and co-wrote another two with Faithfull.
- Cave co-produces with Hal Willner the three tracks on which he wrote the music over Faithfull's lyrics ("Crazy Love", "There Is a Ghost" and "Desperanto") and had his supporting band, The Bad Seeds, performing on all of them.
- Albarn, who appears with Blur in a song on Faithfull's previous album, Kissin Time, co-wrote "Last Song" with her. Another version of the song, with different lyrics on the verses, was later released as "Green Fields" on The Good, the Bad & the Queen's 2007 album, The Good, the Bad & the Queen.
- Jon Brion, also featured on Kissin Time, shares with the singer the songwriting credits of "City of Quartz", the last song of the album.

== Charts ==
Before the Poison reached number 37 at Billboard Top Independent Albums in 2005. It peaked at number 31 in France, number 36 in Denmark and number 61 in Switzerland.

In 2014 it was awarded a gold certification from the Independent Music Companies Association, which indicated sales of at least 75,000 copies throughout Europe.

== Reception ==
Professional ratings
Review scores
Source	Rating
AllMusic	4.5/5 stars
The Guardian	3/5 stars
Mojo	3.5/5 stars
Pitchfork Media	7.9/10
Rolling Stone	2/5 stars

Before the Poison received favorable review upon release, with an average score of 76/100 on Metacritic, indicating favorable reviews. Robb Webb from the BBC described the album as a "career high for Ms Faithfull and a timely release". Billboard described the album as a "winning collaborative combination [that] makes "Before the Poison" even stronger than its 2002 predecessor, "Kissin' Time", but with production and arrangements that are minimalist, dark and desolate". AllMusic described the album as "poetic and unnerving; it stands alone in her catalog in the same way that Broken English did—but this time, on the other side of the mirror". In his review for The New York Times, Jon Pareles wrote that "Most of the songs are elegiac, and Ms. Faithfull infuses them with desolate memories".

== Track listing ==
1. "The Mystery of Love" (PJ Harvey) – 3:53
2. "My Friends Have" (PJ Harvey) – 2:48
3. "Crazy Love" (Marianne Faithfull, Nick Cave) – 4:04
4. "Last Song" (Marianne Faithfull, Damon Albarn) – 3:19
5. "No Child of Mine" (PJ Harvey) – 6:15
6. "Before the Poison" (Marianne Faithfull, PJ Harvey) – 4:10
7. "There Is a Ghost" (Marianne Faithfull, Nick Cave) – 4:32
8. "In the Factory" (Marianne Faithfull, PJ Harvey) – 3:51
9. "Desperanto" (Marianne Faithfull, Nick Cave) – 4:22
10. "City of Quartz" (Marianne Faithfull, Jon Brion) – 4:04

== Charts ==
Chart (2004)	Peak position
Swiss Albums (Schweizer Hitparade)	61
Italian Albums (FIMI)	63
Danish Albums (Hitlisten)	36
French Albums (SNEP)	31
Belgian Albums (Ultratop Flanders)	29
Belgian Albums (Ultratop Wallonia)	39
US Independent Albums (Billboard)	37
UK Independent Albums (Official Charts)	24

== Production credits ==
- Tracks 1, 2, 5, 6 & 8:
  - Produced by PJ Harvey (June–July 2003)
  - Recorded and mixed by Head
  - Vocals and handclapping: Marianne Faithfull
  - Electric and acoustic guitars, bass, synth, backing vocals, piano, slide bass: PJ Harvey
  - Drums, piano, percussion, glockenspiel, handclapping: Rob Ellis
  - Synth bass, electric guitar, bass: Adrian Utley
- Tracks 3, 7 & 9:
  - Produced by Nick Cave and Hal Willner (October 2003)
  - Recorded and mixed by Rik Simpson
  - Vocals: Marianne Faithfull
  - Musicians: Nick Cave, Warren Ellis, Martyn P. Casey and Jim Sclavunos
- Tracks 4 & 10:
  - Produced by Rob Ellis and Head (September 2003)
  - Recorded and mixed by Head
  - Assistant engineers: Andrew Rugg and Rik Simpson
  - Vocals: Marianne Faithfull
  - Drums, piano, percussion, vibraphone, sound effects, string arrangements: Rob Ellis
  - Acoustic guitar, bass, toy piano, sampling: Adrian Utley
  - Violin: Catherine Browning
  - Cello: Andy Nice
  - Piano: Diana Gutkind
- Mastering: John Dent
- Photos: Jean Baptiste Mondino
