= Kingdom of Doom =

- Gatefold 7" and CD cover

Single by The Good, the Bad & the Queen

from the album The Good, the Bad & the Queen
- Released: 15 January 2007
- Recorded: 2005–2006
- Genre: Alternative rock
- Length: 2:42
- Label: Parlophone, Honest Jon's
- Songwriter(s): Damon Albarn
- Producer(s): Danger Mouse

The Good, the Bad & the Queen singles chronology
"Herculean" (2006)	"Kingdom of Doom" (2007)	"Green Fields" (2007)

Alternative cover
- Red vinyl 7" cover

"Kingdom of Doom" is a song by the British alternative rock supergroup the Good, the Bad & the Queen, made up of Damon Albarn, Paul Simonon, Simon Tong and Tony Allen and is the fourth track on their 2007 album The Good, the Bad & the Queen (see 2007 in British music).

The song was also released as the band's second single in January 2007. Note that the single release, issued a week before the album came out, quite clearly credits the artist as The Good, The Bad & The Queen, although Albarn later claimed the band was unnamed, and that The Good, The Bad & The Queen was simply the name of the album.

Upon release, the single charted at #20, the only one of the band's three singles to reach the Top 20.

== Track listings ==
- Promo CD CDRDJ6732
1. "Kingdom of Doom" - 2.42
- Gatefold 7" R6732
1. "Kingdom of Doom" - 2:42
2. "The Good, the Bad & the Queen" (live at The Tabernacle) - 4:22
- Red vinyl 7" RS6732
1. "Kingdom of Doom" - 2:42
2. "Start Point (Sketches of Devon)" - 4:47
- CD CDR6732
1. "Kingdom of Doom" - 2:42
2. "Hallsands Waltz (Sketches of Devon)" - 2:55
3. "The Bunting Song (live at The Tabernacle) - 3:57
- Download
1. "Kingdom of Doom" (live at The Roundhouse) - 3:20

== Packaging ==
The artwork for the red vinyl 7" format of the single was created by the band's bassist Paul Simonon, making reference to the building in which the group recorded the video.

== Chart positions ==
"Kingdom of Doom" - UK Singles Chart
Week	1	2
Position	20	44

== Personnel ==
- Damon Albarn: Vocals, Piano, Organ, Synthesizers
- Simon Tong: Guitars
- Paul Simonon: Bass Guitar
- Danger Mouse: Tambourine, Windchimes
- Tony Allen: Drums

== Track reviews ==
- NME.com - Reviews - The Good, The Bad & The Queen: Kingdom of Doom
- The Downloader
