= Green Fields =

- Green vinyl 7" cover

Single by The Good, the Bad & the Queen

from the album The Good, the Bad & the Queen
- Released: 2 April 2007
- Recorded: 2005–2006
- Genre: Alternative rock
- Length: 2:26
- Label: Parlophone, Honest Jon's
- Songwriter: Damon Albarn
- Producer: Danger Mouse

The Good, the Bad & the Queen singles chronology
"Kingdom of Doom" (2007)	"Green Fields" (2007)	"'Live from SoHo'" (2007)

"Green Fields" is the third single by British alternative rock band the Good, the Bad & the Queen. "Green Fields" is also the eleventh track on the group's 2007 debut album The Good, the Bad & the Queen.

The song was released on 2 April 2007 as the band's third single in the United Kingdom. The single debuted—and peaked—at #51 in the UK Singles Chart on 8 April, substantially lower than "Kingdom of Doom" which had reached the Top 20 upon release in January.

In the album's review for NME, Hamish MacBain called the song "the best thing Damon's ever written."

== Song background ==
Damon Albarn wrote the original version of the song following a night out with Blur bassist Alex James and Marianne Faithfull. That demo was recorded in a studio on Goldhawk Road, Hammersmith and Albarn gave the tape to Faithfull. It was later recorded by Faithfull with different lyrics in the verses and released on her 2005 album Before the Poison as "Last Song."

Alexis Petridis of The Guardian commented that as the album comes to a close "we find Damon Albarn reflecting on the passing of time." The reviewer explicitly described this song's lyrical beginning "years ago, somewhere on the Goldhawk Road" as more than a "reference to the west London thoroughfare whose traffic noise appears on the 1995 Blur album The Great Escape" (this London thoroughfare is the noise at the start of the song "Ernold Same" from that album). Petridis remarks that Albarn "suggests that "years ago" means the height of Britpop," especially when Albarn sings "how the world has changed."

The song makes reference to a "war" and a "tidal wave"; referencing the War on Iraq and the 2004 Boxing Day tsunami.

== The song and DRM ==
On the day the single was released, Apple Inc. and EMI announced a new deal to end that label's use of digital rights management. At the press conference, the band played a short set consisting of "Herculean" and "Nature Springs." The single for "Green Fields" became the first new release by the band to be issued without DRM. The album The Good, the Bad & the Queen was also the first album issued under the new plan. The remainder of EMI's online catalogue underwent upgrades to the same superior quality download rate (320 kbit/s) shortly thereafter.

== Track listings ==
Promo CD CDRDJ6738
No.	Title	Length
1.	"Green Fields"	2:26
Total length:		2:26

Gatefold 7" R6738
No.	Title	Length
1.	"Green Fields"	2:26
2.	"England, Summer (in black & white) Dog House"	4:06
Total length:		6:36

Green vinyl 7" RS6738
No.	Title	Length
1.	"Green Fields"	2:26
2.	"England, Summer (in black & white) Polling Day"	4:53
Total length:		7:19

Enhanced CD CDRS6738
No.	Title	Length
1.	"Green Fields"	2:26
2.	"England, Summer (in black & white) Polling Day"	4:53
3.	"Green Fields" (original demo)	2:40
4.	"Kingdom of Doom" (video)
Total length:		9:59

== Chart positions ==
"Green Fields" - UK Singles Chart
Week	1
Position	51
