= Simon Tong =

English guitarist and keyboardist

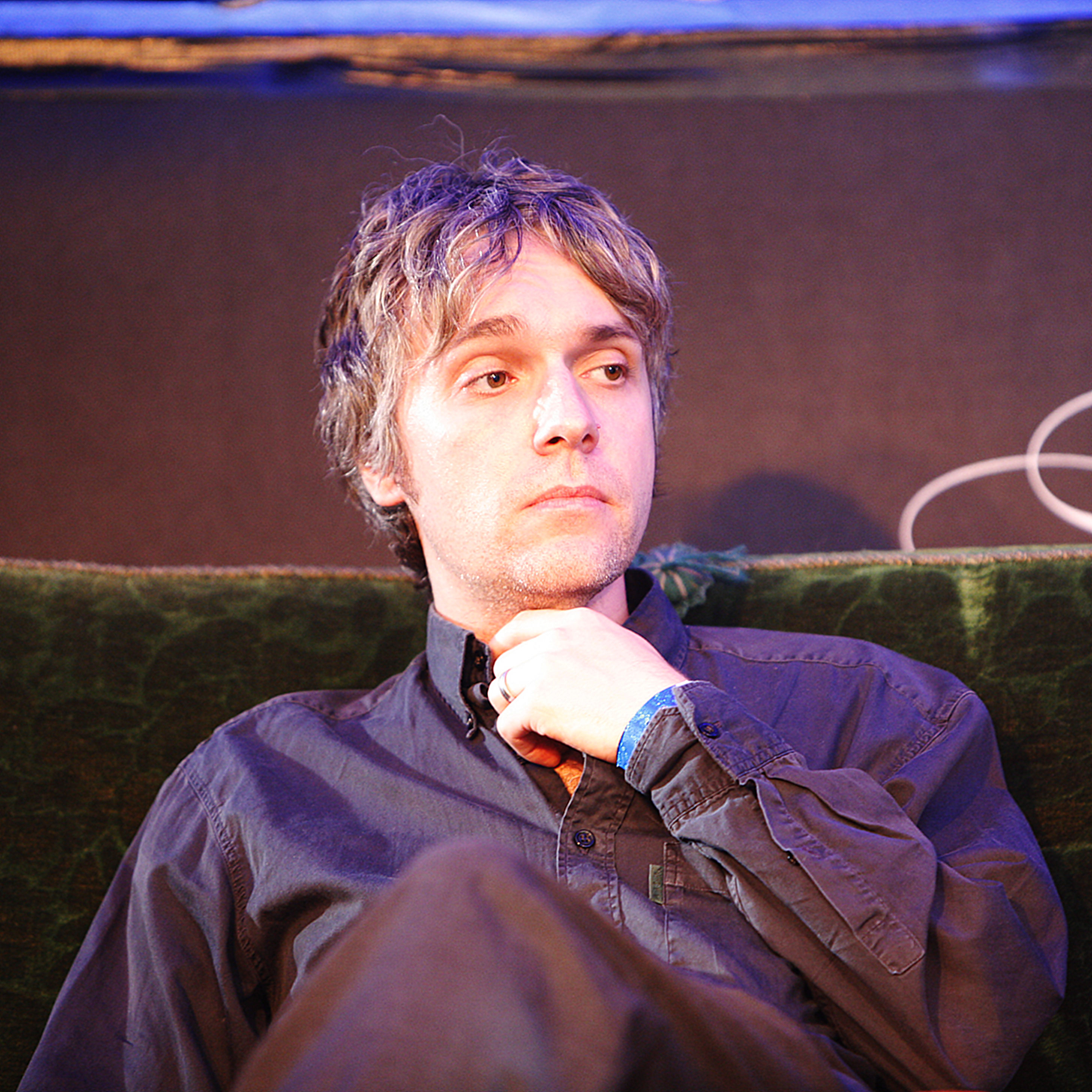
- Simon Tong in 2007

Background information
- Born: 9 July 1972 (age 54); Farnworth, Lancashire, England
- Genres: Alternative rock, Britpop, shoegazing, neo-psychedelia
- Occupations: Musician; producer
- Instruments: Guitar; keyboards
- Member of: Erland and the Carnival; Transmission; The Magnetic North
- Formerly of: The Verve; The Shining; Blur; Gorillaz; The Good, the Bad & the Queen

Simon Tong (born 9 July 1972) is an English guitarist and keyboardist who was a member of the Verve between 1996 and 1999. He has played with Damon Albarn on tour with his bands Blur and Gorillaz, and as a member of the Good, the Bad & the Queen. He ranks in BBC's "The Axe Factor" as the 40th greatest guitarist of the last 30 years.

Tong grew up in the Lancashire town of Skelmersdale, the subject of his most recent release, Prospect of Skelmersdale with his project The Magnetic North.

== Career ==
=== The Verve; 1996–1999 ===
From 1996 to 1999, Tong was a guitarist and keyboardist for The Verve. He was brought in to replace lead guitarist Nick McCabe after the band's first short-lived split, but remained with them when McCabe returned, and Tong acted as rhythm guitarist (also keyboardist) while McCabe as lead guitarist like he did before. Their third album was 1997's highly acclaimed Urban Hymns. He played on many of their hits from that time such as "The Drugs Don't Work", "Bitter Sweet Symphony" and "Sonnet". The Verve disbanded in 1999 and later reformed in 2007, this time without Tong, as Jones stated in an interview, "When we were getting the band back together we wanted to go back to the core members, he was cool with it, he understood. He would like to have been part of it but he understood the reasons." By 2009 they had disbanded again.

=== The Shining; 2002–2003 ===
After The Verve disbanded for second time, Tong and Simon Jones (The Verve) were members of short lived band The Shining from 2002 to 2003.

=== Blur/Gorillaz; 2002–2010 ===
Following Graham Coxon's departure from Blur in 2002, Tong was recruited as the guitarist for the band's live performances in support of the album Think Tank (2003). He continued the relationship formed with frontman Damon Albarn by contributing guitar to Gorillaz' 2005 album Demon Days and playing guitar in the Gorillaz live band for the Demon Days Live performances. Tong also contributed guitar to Gorillaz' 2010 album Plastic Beach and substituted for lead guitarist Jeff Wootton on certain dates of the Escape to Plastic Beach Tour.

=== Erland and the Carnival/The Good, the Bad and the Queen; 2006–2019 ===
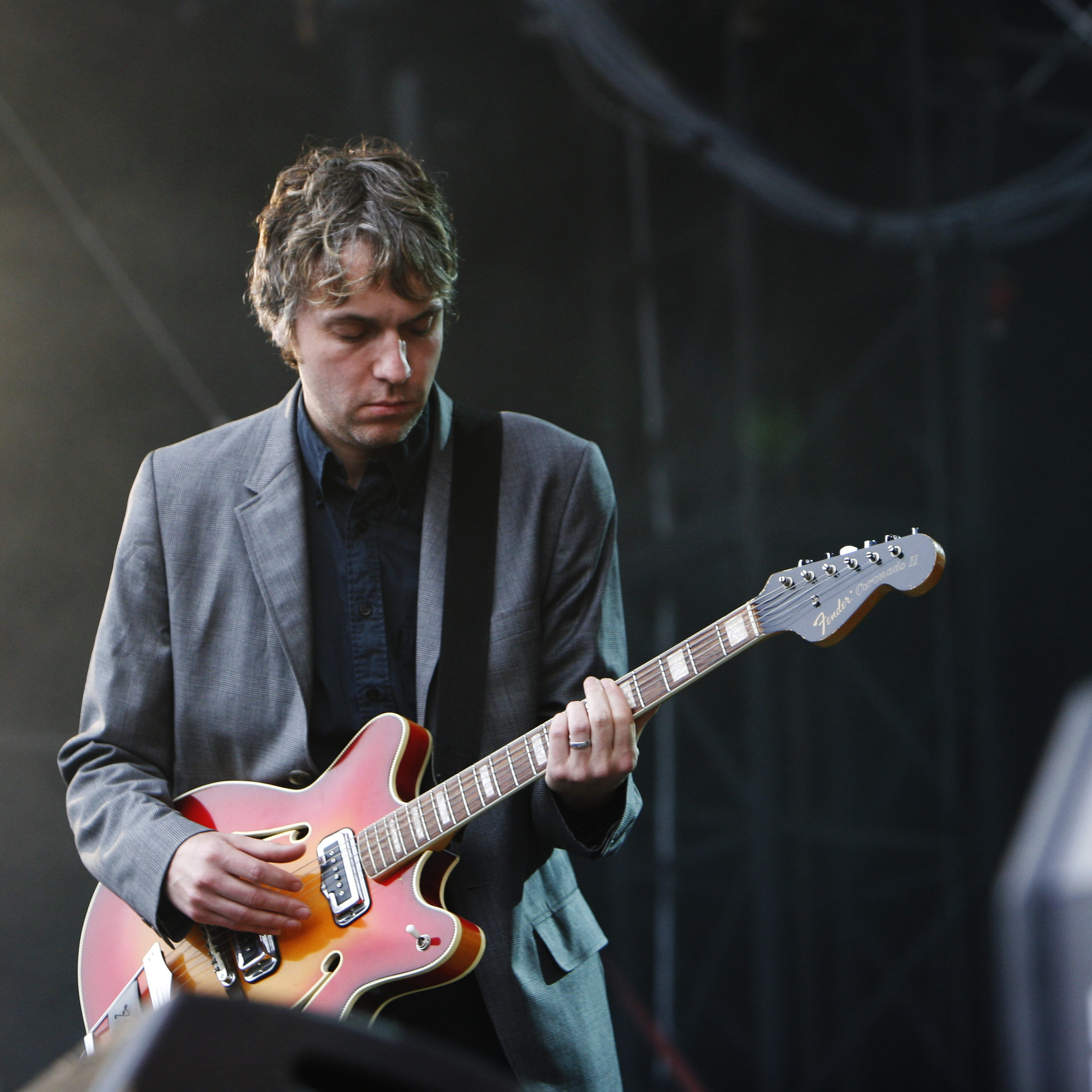
Tong performing in 2007

In July 2006, it was reported that Tong would again be working with Damon Albarn. NME reported that Albarn had foregone plans to record a solo album and instead formed a new group The Good, the Bad & the Queen, which featured Tong with Albarn, former Clash bassist Paul Simonon and drummer Tony Allen. The band released the single "Herculean" in October 2006 and later released their self titled debut studio album on 23 January 2007. The album enjoyed very good reviews and a second single, "Kingdom of Doom", was also released in January 2007 as part of their pan European tour.

The band was active again after a decade, releasing their second album, Merrie Land on 16 November 2018 to largely positive reviews. It was supported by a 2018 December tour in the UK and a European tour in 2019. However, the band was split again shortly after finished the UK and Europe tour.

In 2021, Tong contributed to Damon Albarn's solo album, The Nearer the Fountain, More Pure the Stream Flows.

=== The Magnetic North; 2012–present ===
Simon Tong co-created The Magnetic North with Erland Cooper of Erland and the Carnival, and Hannah Peel of John Foxx and the Maths. They originally planned on only releasing one album in 2012, Orkney: Symphony of the Magnetic North, but due to its popularity reconvened to release follow-up Prospect of Skelmersdale in 2016, a concept album about Tong's Transcendentalist hometown, Skelmersdale.

== Other projects ==
Tong also set up a record label with Youth (of Killing Joke) called Butterfly Recordings. The first acts to be released are Indigo Moss and Duke Garwood, along with a compilation entitled What the Folk.

In 2012 Simon contributed to the recording of the Dr Dee soundtrack, written by Damon Albarn, which was released on 7 May 2012.

He was a member of the band Transmission with Youth, Paul Ferguson (of Killing Joke) and Tim Bran (of Dreadzone) which has released a single called "Noctolucent" and an album, Beyond Light, in 2006. He has also played guitar on several tracks on the 2007 Client album Heartland.

Tong was asked to play guitar on the album Apriti sesamo by Italian composer Franco Battiato. After its 2012 release Tong toured with Battiato in Italy.

In 2020 Tong was involved in a project called Mirry with his brother-in-law Tom Fraser and Kirsteen McNish. It resulted in an album based around the 1950s piano recordings of Fraser's great aunt Mirry.

== Personal life ==
Tong grew up with fellow Verve member Richard Ashcroft and went to school with other members of The Verve. Tong is credited with teaching Ashcroft guitar.
