= Damon Albarn =

British musician (born 1968)

Damon Albarn OBE
- Albarn in 2026

Background information
- Born: 23 March 1968 (age 58); Whitechapel, London, England
- Genres: Alternative rock; art pop; Britpop; electronic; hip-hop
- Occupations: Singer; musician; songwriter; record producer
- Instruments: Vocals; keyboards; guitar
- Works: Discography
- Years active: 1988–present
- Labels: Food; SBK; Virgin; Parlophone; XL; Honest Jon's; Warner; Transgressive
- Member of: Blur; Gorillaz
- Formerly of: The Good, the Bad & the Queen; Rocket Juice & the Moon
- Partners: Justine Frischmann (1991–1998); Suzi Winstanley (1998–2023)
- Website: www.damonalbarnmusic.com

Damon Albarn (/ˈɔːlbɑːrn/ ALL-barn; born 23 March 1968) is an English musician. He is the main vocalist, keyboardist, and lyricist of the rock band Blur as well as the co-creator and primary musical contributor of the virtual band Gorillaz.

While attending the Stanway School, Albarn met Graham Coxon, with whom he formed Blur in 1988. They released their debut album, Leisure, in 1991. After spending long periods touring the US, Albarn's songwriting became increasingly influenced by British bands from the 1960s. The result was the Blur albums Modern Life Is Rubbish (1993), Parklife (1994) and The Great Escape (1995). All three received acclaim, while Blur gained mass popularity in the UK, aided by a Britpop chart rivalry with Oasis. Chart-topping albums such as Blur (1997), 13 (1999) and Think Tank (2003) incorporated influences from lo-fi, art rock, electronic and world music. These were followed by The Magic Whip (2015), Blur's first studio album in 12 years, and The Ballad of Darren in 2023.

Albarn formed the virtual band Gorillaz in 1998 with comic book artist Jamie Hewlett, drawing influences from electronic, hip-hop and world music, Gorillaz released their self-titled debut album in 2001 to worldwide success and have continued to release albums and tour. Albarn remains the group's only consistent musical contributor. His other projects include the supergroups the Good, the Bad & the Queen and Rocket Juice & the Moon. He co-founded the non-profit musical organisation Africa Express and has composed film soundtracks. Albarn also scored the stage productions Monkey: Journey to the West (2007), Dr Dee (2011) and Wonder.land (2015). His debut solo album, Everyday Robots, was released in 2014, followed by The Nearer the Fountain, More Pure the Stream Flows in 2021.

Albarn is widely regarded as one of the most influential British musicians of his generation. He is known for his prolific output, musical experimentation, and collaborations with artists from diverse genres. He was appointed Officer of the Order of the British Empire in the 2016 New Year Honours for services to music.

== Early life ==
Damon Albarn was born on 23 March 1968 in Whitechapel, London. He is the eldest child of artist Keith Albarn and his wife Hazel (née Dring). He has some Danish descent through his mother. Their daughter Jessica (born 1971) also went on to become an artist. Hazel, originally from Lincolnshire, was a theatrical set designer for Joan Littlewood's theatre company at the Theatre Royal Stratford East in London, and was working on the satirical play Mrs Wilson's Diary just before Damon was born. Keith, originally from Nottinghamshire, was briefly the manager of Soft Machine and was once a guest on BBC's Late Night Line-Up. He was head of the Colchester School of Art at Colchester Institute.

Damon's paternal grandfather Edward, an architect, had been a conscientious objector during the Second World War and was involved in a farming community in Lincolnshire, becoming a peace activist. In 2002 Edward Albarn died; Damon stated in an interview that Edward did not want to live any longer and decided to go on a hunger strike. In 1968, at the age of six months, Albarn was a "testing expert" for designs for educational aids and toys for children including fibreglass furniture and play-structures fancifully called "The Kissmequiosk". "The Apollo Cumfycraft" and "The Tailendcharlie" produced by his father's company "Keith Albarn & Partners Ltd" under the trade-name of "Playlearn, Ltd."

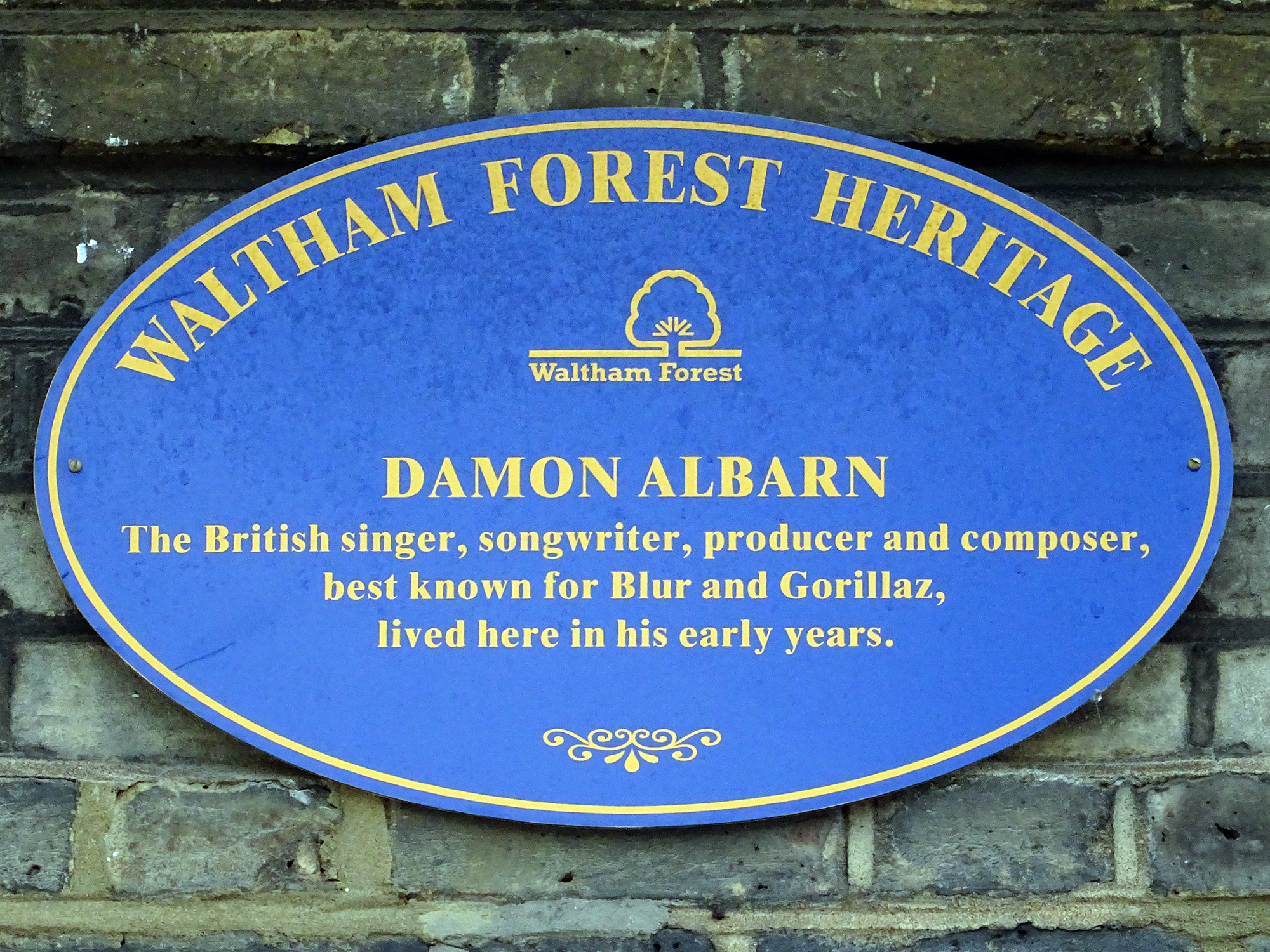
Commemorative plaque at 21 Fillebrook Road Leytonstone, east London, where Albarn was brought up

When Damon and Jessica were growing up, their family moved to Leytonstone, east London. The household was described as "bohemian" and their upbringing as "liberal". Damon and Jessica were also raised in the Quaker religion. Albarn agreed with his parents' views, later claiming, "I always thought my parents were absolutely dead right. I went against the grain in a weird way – by continually following them." His parents primarily listened to blues, Indian ragas and African music. When Albarn was nine years old, his family took a holiday trip to Turkey for three months before settling in Aldham Fordstreet, Essex, an area described by Albarn as "one of those burgeoning Thatcher experiments where they were building loads of small estates". The population of the area was predominantly white as opposed to the ethnically mixed part of London which he had become used to. He described himself as "not really fitting in with the politics of the place."

Albarn was interested in music from an early age, attending an Osmonds concert at the age of six. He started playing guitar, piano and violin in his youth and was interested in composing music, one of his compositions winning a heat in the nationwide Young Composer of the Year competition. Damon and Jessica both attended a primary school nearby which, according to Damon, was burnt down seven times over a period of 18 months by one of the teachers. After both siblings failed their Eleven-Plus exams, they started attending Stanway Comprehensive School, where Damon described himself as being "really unpopular" and "[irritating to] a lot of people". However, he developed an interest in drama and started acting in various school productions. It was at Stanway where he would meet future Blur guitarist Graham Coxon, who recalls seeing him act and feeling that he was a "confident performer" as well as a "show off". Albarn's first words directed at Coxon were "Your brogues are crap, mate. Look, mine are the proper sort" as he was showing off his leather shoes, fashionable footwear at the time influenced by the Mod Revival. Nevertheless, the pair went on to become good friends, owing to their shared passion for music, particularly bands such as the Jam, the Beatles, the Human League, XTC and Madness. Albarn has also credited the Specials and Fun Boy Three as some of his earliest influences, and John Lennon in his taking up songwriting.

He studied acting at the East 15 Acting School in Debden, but left after the first year. On leaving drama school he entered a production and management contract with Marijke Bergkamp and Graeme Holdaway, owners of the Beat Factory recording studio, where the members of Blur, then known as Seymour, did their first recordings. His first band was the synthpop group, Two's a Crowd. Before Blur, he played with the Aftermath and Real Lives.

== Music career ==
=== Blur ===
==== Formation and Leisure ====
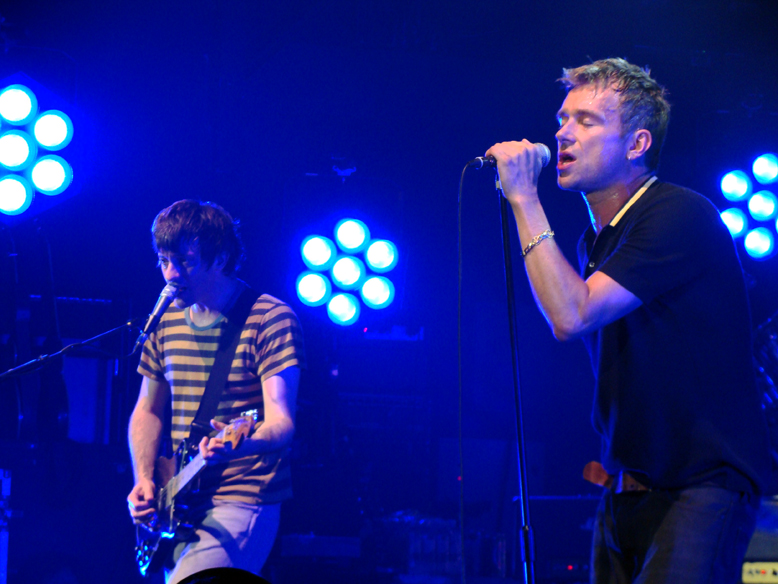
Albarn (right) and Graham Coxon (left) performing with Blur at Newcastle Academy in June 2009

Albarn enrolled on a part-time music course at London's Goldsmiths College in 1988, claiming that his sole intention was to gain access to the student union bar. Albarn was in a group named Circus alongside Coxon and drummer Dave Rowntree. Alex James, a fellow student at Goldsmiths, eventually joined as the group's bassist. They changed their name to Seymour in December 1988, inspired by J. D. Salinger's Seymour: An Introduction. In March 1990, after changing their name to Blur, they signed to Food Records.

In October 1990, Blur released their first single, "She's So High", which reached number 48 in the UK singles chart. The band had trouble creating a follow-up single, but made progress when paired with producer Stephen Street. The resulting single, "There's No Other Way", became a hit, peaking at number eight. As a result of the single's success, Blur became pop stars and were accepted into a clique of bands who frequented the Syndrome club in London dubbed the "Scene That Celebrates Itself". The recording of the group's debut album was hindered by Albarn having to write his lyrics in the studio. Although the resulting album Leisure (1991) peaked at number seven on the UK Albums Chart, it received mixed reviews, and according to journalist John Harris, "could not shake off the odour of anti-climax". Albarn has since referred to Leisure as "awful".

==== Britpop era ====
After discovering they were £60,000 in debt, Blur toured the US in 1992 in an attempt to recoup their losses. Albarn and the band became increasingly unhappy and homesick during the two-month American tour and began writing songs which "created an English atmosphere". Blur had undergone an ideological and image shift intended to celebrate their English heritage in contrast to the popularity of American grunge bands like Nirvana. Although sceptical of Albarn's new manifesto, Balfe gave his assent for the band's choice of Andy Partridge of the band XTC to produce their follow-up to Leisure. The sessions with Partridge proved unsatisfactory, but a chance reunion with Stephen Street resulted in him returning to produce the group.

The second Blur album, Modern Life Is Rubbish, was released in May 1993 and peaked at number 15 on the British charts, but failed to break into the US Billboard 200, selling only 19,000 copies. Despite the album's poor performance, Albarn was happy with the band's direction and wrote prolifically for Blur's next album. Parklife was released in 1994 and revived Blur's commercial fortunes, with the album's first single, the disco-influenced "Girls & Boys", achieving critical acclaim and chart success. Parklife entered the British charts at number one and stayed in the album charts for 90 weeks. Enthusiastically greeted by the music press, Parklife is regarded as one of Britpop's defining records. Blur won four awards at the 1995 Brit Awards, including Best British Group and British Album of the Year for Parklife. Coxon later pointed to Parklife as the moment when "[Blur] went from being regarded as an alternative, leftfield arty band to this amazing new pop sensation". Albarn was uncomfortable with fame, however, and he suffered from panic attacks.

Blur began working on their fourth album The Great Escape at the start of 1995. Building upon the band's previous two albums, Albarn's lyrics for the album consisted of several third-person narratives. James reflected, "It was all more elaborate, more orchestral, more theatrical, and the lyrics were even more twisted ... It was all dysfunctional, misfit characters fucking up." The release of the album's lead single "Country House" played a part in Blur's public rivalry with Manchester band Oasis termed the "Battle of Britpop". Partly due to increasing antagonism between the groups, Blur and Oasis decided to release their new singles on the same day, an event the NME called the "British Heavyweight Championship". The debate over which band would top the British singles chart became a media phenomenon, and Albarn appeared on News at Ten. At the end of the week, "Country House" outsold Oasis' "Roll With It" by 274,000 copies to 216,000, becoming Blur's first number-one single.

The Great Escape was released in September 1995 to positive reviews, and entered the UK charts at number one. However, opinion quickly changed and Blur found themselves largely out of favour with the media. BBC Music writer James McMahon recalled how the "critical euphoria" surrounding the album lasted "about as long as it took publishers to realise Oasis would probably shift more magazines for them". Following the worldwide success of Oasis' (What's the Story) Morning Glory?, the media quipped that Blur "wound up winning the battle but losing the war." Blur became perceived as an "inauthentic middle-class pop band" in comparison to "working-class heroes" Oasis, which Albarn said made him feel "stupid and confused". Bassist James said: "After being the People's Hero, Damon was the People's Prick for a short period ... basically, he was a loser – very publicly." In the New Statesman, Stuart Maconie noted "Albarn... was mocked as the posh boy of Britpop when in fact he’d gone to a comprehensive in Essex and his family was just mildly bohemian. Nowadays he’d be decidedly 'below stairs'".

==== Post-Britpop and hiatus ====
An early 1996 Q interview reported that relations between Blur members had become strained; journalist Adrian Deevoy wrote that he found them "on the verge of a nervous breakup." Coxon, in particular, began to resent his bandmates and, in a rejection of the group's Britpop aesthetic, made a point of listening to noisy American alternative rock bands such as Pavement. Albarn grew to appreciate Coxon's tastes in lo-fi and underground music, and recognised the need to change Blur's musical direction once again. "I can sit at my piano and write brilliant observational pop songs all day long but you've got to move on," he said, and decided to give Coxon more creative control over their new album. Albarn visited Iceland during this period: "I used to have a recurring dream, as a child, of a black sand beach. And one hazy, lazy day [laughs], I was watching the TV and I saw a programme about Iceland, and they had black beaches. So I got on a plane ... I was on my own. I didn't know anybody. I went into the street, Laugavegur, where the bars are, and that was it."

After initial sessions in London, the band left to record the rest of the album in Iceland, away from the Britpop scene. The result was Blur, the band's fifth studio album, released in February 1997. Although the music press predicted that the lo-fi sonic experimentation would alienate Blur's teenage girl fanbase, they generally applauded the effort. Pointing out lyrics such as "Look inside America / She's alright", and noting Albarn's "obligatory nod to Beck, [and promotion of] the new Pavement album as if paid to do so", reviewers felt the band had come to accept American values during this time – an about-face of their attitude during the Britpop years. Despite cries of "commercial suicide," the album and its first single, "Beetlebum", debuted at number one in the UK. Although the album could not match the sales of their previous albums in the UK, Blur became the band's most successful internationally, particularly in the US, helped by the successful single "Song 2". After the success of Blur, the band embarked on a nine-month world tour.

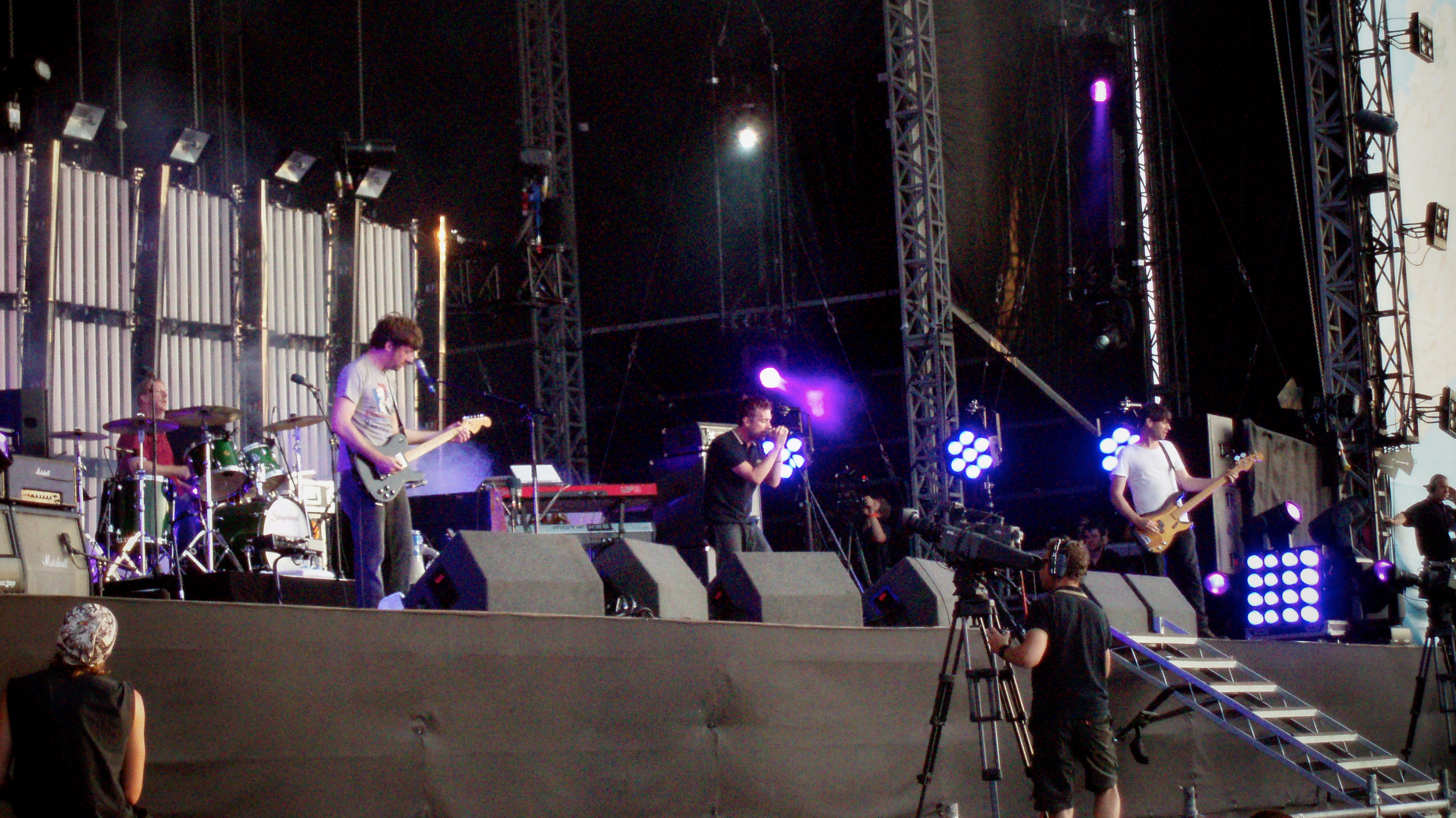
Blur performing at Hyde Park in July 2009

Blur's sixth studio album 13, released in March 1999, saw them drift further from Britpop. Albarn's lyrics – more heartfelt, personal and intimate than on previous occasions – were reflective of his break-up with Elastica frontwoman Justine Frischmann, his partner of eight years. Recording for Blur's next album began in London in November 2001. Not long after the sessions began, Coxon left the group. Coxon stated "there were no rows" and "[the band] just recognised the feeling that we needed some time apart". Think Tank, released in May 2003, was filled with atmospheric, brooding electronic sounds, featuring simpler guitar lines by Albarn, and largely relying on other instruments to replace Coxon. The guitarist's absence also meant that Think Tank was written mostly by Albarn. Its sound was seen as testament to Albarn's increasing interest in African and Middle Eastern music and to his control over the group's direction. Think Tank was another UK No. 1 and achieved Blur's highest US position of No. 56. The album was also nominated for best album at the 2004 Brit Awards.

==== Reunion ====
In December 2008, Blur announced they would reunite for a concert at London's Hyde Park on 3 July 2009. Days later, the band added a second date, for 2 July. A series of June preview shows were also announced, ending at Manchester Evening News arena on the 26th. All the shows were well received; The Guardian's music critic Alexis Petridis gave their performance at Goldsmiths College a full five stars, and wrote that "Blur's music seems to have potentiated by the passing of years ... they sound both more frenetic and punky and more nuanced and exploratory than they did at the height of their fame". Blur headlined the Glastonbury Festival on 28 June, where they played for the first time since their headline slot in 1998. Reviews of the Glastonbury performance were enthusiastic; The Guardian called them "the best Glastonbury headliners in an age".

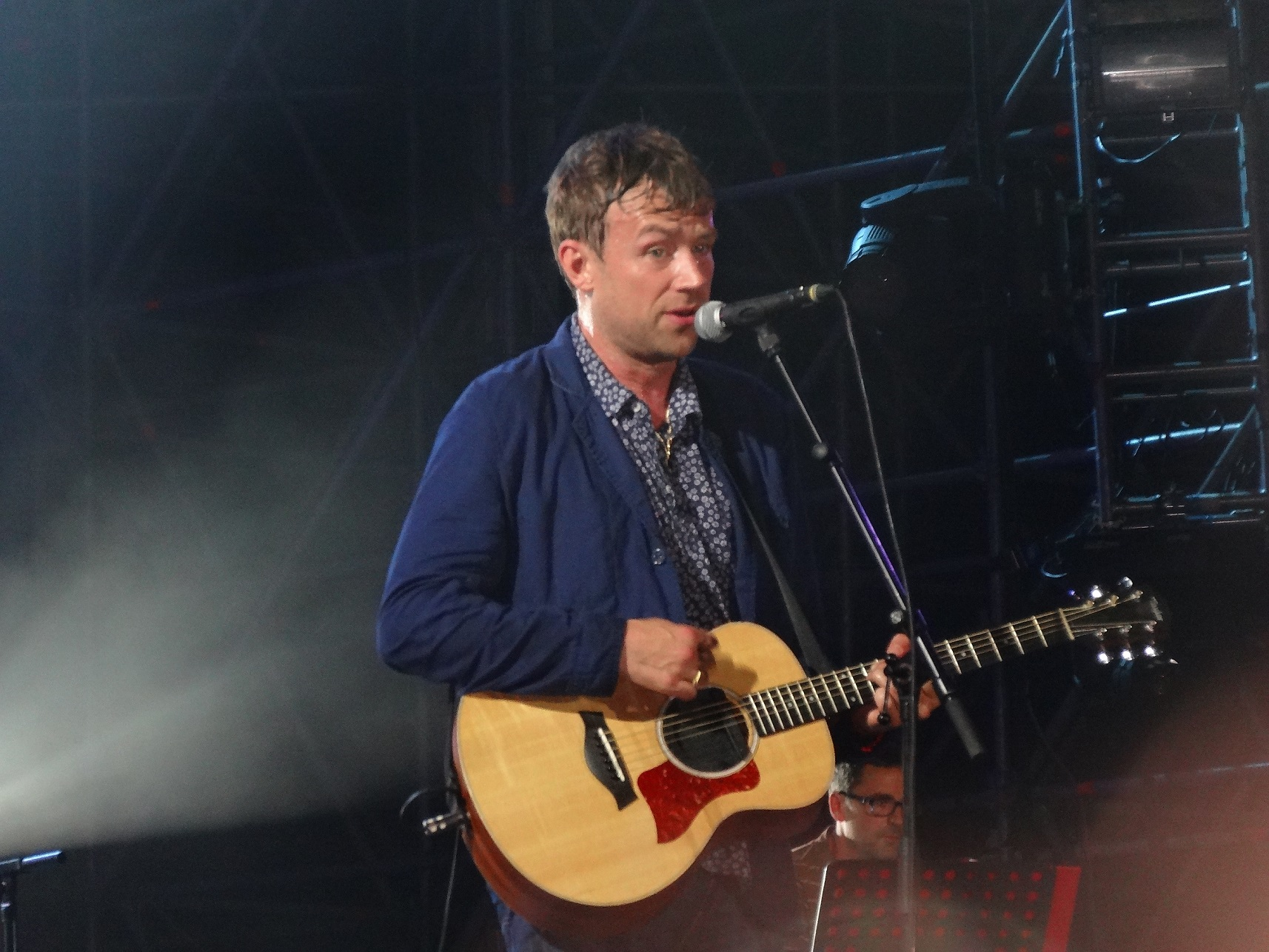
Albarn with Blur at the Rock in Roma, 2013

The band released their second greatest-hits album Midlife: A Beginner's Guide to Blur in June 2009. After the completion of the reunion dates, Albarn told Q that the band had no intention of recording or touring live again. He said, "I just can't do it anymore", and explained that the main motivation for participating in the reunion was to repair his relationship with Coxon, which succeeded.

In January 2010, No Distance Left to Run, a documentary about the band, was released in cinemas and a month later on DVD and was nominated as Best Long Form Music Video for the 53rd Grammy Awards, Blur's first-ever Grammy nomination. In April 2010, Blur released their first new recording since 2003, "Fool's Day" in April 2010 as part of the Record Store Day event as a vinyl record limited to 1000 copies; it was later made available as a free download on their website.

In February 2012, Blur were awarded the Outstanding Contribution to Music award at the 2012 Brit Awards. Later that month, Albarn and Coxon premiered a new track together live, "Under the Westway". Blur entered the studio early that year to record material for a new album, but in May producer William Orbit told the NME that Albarn had halted recording. Blur released two singles "The Puritan" and "Under the Westway" on 2 July. That August, Blur headlined a show at Hyde Park for the 2012 Summer Olympics closing ceremony which was followed by a world tour the following year. On 19 February 2015, Blur announced on social media that they would be releasing their eighth studio album on 27 April, titled The Magic Whip, Blur's first album in 12 years and first in 16 years in their original line-up.

=== Gorillaz ===
Albarn and Jamie Hewlett met in 1990 when Coxon, a fan of Hewlett's work, asked him to interview Blur. The interview was published in Deadline magazine, home of Hewlett's comic strip, Tank Girl. Hewlett initially thought Albarn was "arsey, a wanker", and despite becoming one of the band's acquaintances, Hewlett often did not get on with its members, especially after he started going out with Coxon's ex-girlfriend, Jane Olliver. Nonetheless, Albarn and Hewlett started sharing a flat on Westbourne Grove in London in 1997. Hewlett had recently broken up with Olliver and Albarn was also at the end of his highly publicised relationship with Frischmann.

The idea to create Gorillaz came about when the two were watching MTV: "If you watch MTV for too long, it's a bit like hell—there's nothing of substance there. So we got this idea for a cartoon band, something that would be a comment on that," Hewlett said. The band's music is a collaboration between various musicians, Albarn being the only permanent musical contributor, and incorporates influences including alternative rock, Britpop, dub, hip-hop, and pop music. In 2001, the band's eponymous debut album sold over seven million copies, and featured hits such as the songs "19-2000" and "Clint Eastwood," earning them an entry in the Guinness Book of World Records as the Most Successful Virtual Band.

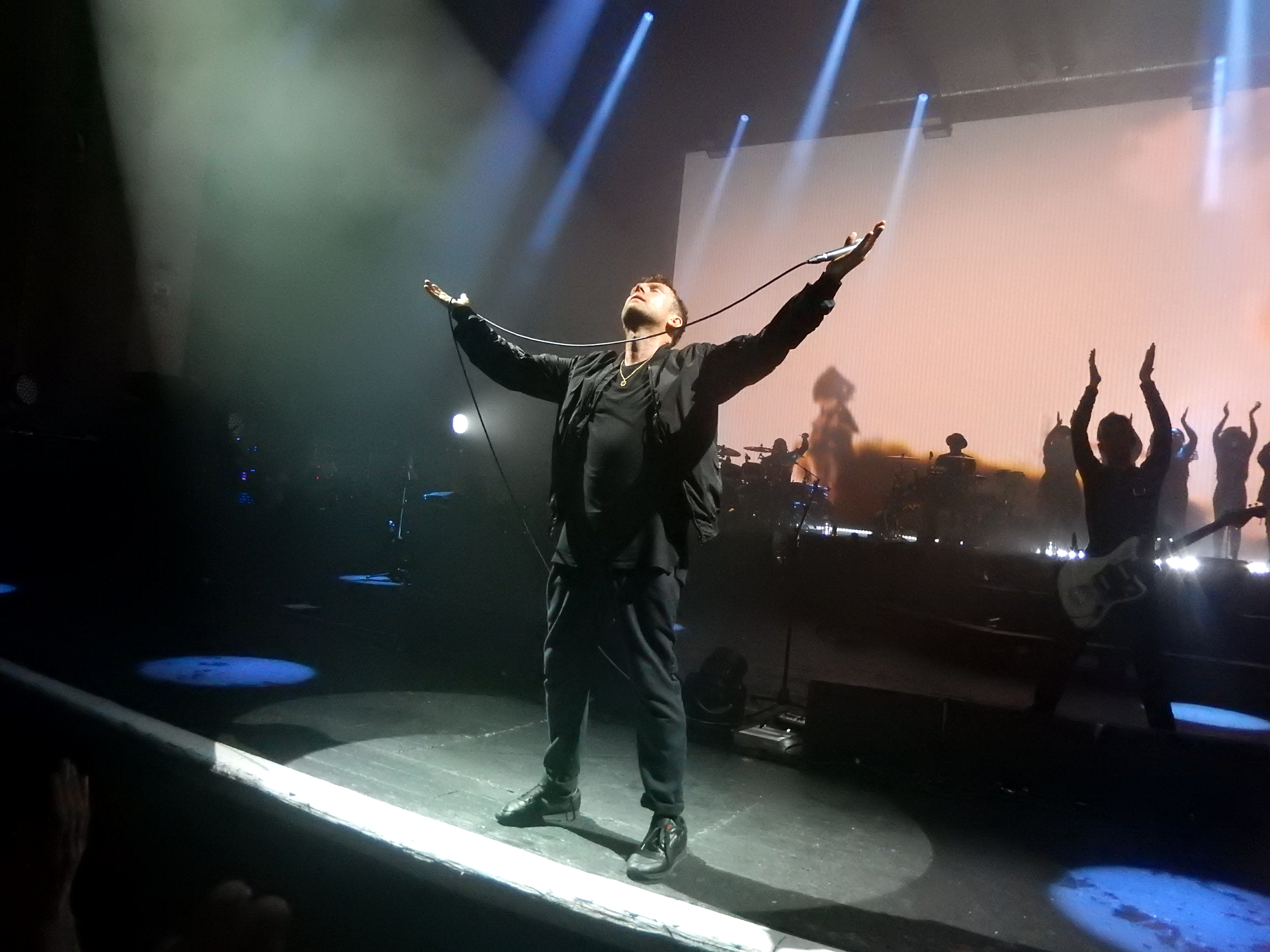
Albarn on stage with Gorillaz at the Brixton Academy in London, June 2017

The second Gorillaz studio album, Demon Days, was released in 2005 and included the singles "Feel Good Inc.", "Dare", "Dirty Harry", "Kids with Guns" and "El Mañana". Demon Days went five times platinum in the UK, double platinum in the United States and earned five Grammy Award nominations for 2006 and won one of them in the Best Pop Collaboration with Vocals category. The combined sales of Gorillaz and Demon Days had, by 2007, exceeded 15 million albums. Gorillaz released their third studio album, Plastic Beach, in early 2010, which was received with high praise. In December 2010, the group released The Fall, recorded over 32 days during their North American tour.

In a 2012 interview, Albarn talked about the unlikelihood of any future Gorillaz releases; his relationship with Hewlett had soured when Albarn chose to undercut the role of animation on their Escape to Plastic Beach World Tour. Albarn later rescinded this claim, stating "When Jamie [Hewlett] and I have worked out our differences, I'm sure we'll make another record." On 23 March 2017, the fifth Gorillaz studio album, Humanz, was announced and released worldwide on 28 April 2017. The sixth Gorillaz album, The Now Now, was announced on 31 May 2018 and released on 29 June 2018. In 2020, Gorillaz began a project called Song Machine, in which new songs with collaborations would be released as monthly "episodes". The first nine episodes were compiled together along with more songs in Gorillaz's seventh studio album, Song Machine, Season One: Strange Timez, which was released on 23 October 2020 to positive reviews. A second season of Song Machine was planned, though it was later scrapped. On 31 August 2022, their eighth studio album, Cracker Island was announced, and was later released on 24 February 2023. In September 2025, the band announced "The Happy Dictator" with American band Sparks as the lead single of their album The Mountain, which released on 27 February 2026.

=== Solo career and side projects ===
In 2000, Albarn participated in the soundtrack of Ordinary Decent Criminal. Albarn released Mali Music in 2002, recorded in Mali, during a trip he made to support Oxfam in 2000. He has visited Nigeria to record music with Nigerian drummer Tony Allen.

In 2003, Albarn released an EP, Democrazy, a compilation of demos he recorded in various hotel rooms during the United States portion of Think Tank's tour.

Albarn collaborated with producers Dan the Automator, XL Recordings, Richard Russell & Rodaidh McDonald, Jneiro Jarel, DJ Darren Cunningham aka Actress, Marc Antoine, Alwest, Remi Kabaka Jr., Totally Enormous Extinct Dinosaurs and Kwes as part of his week-long visit to Kinshasa, Democratic Republic of the Congo to record an album, Kinshasa One Two, released in 2011. All proceeds benefit Oxfam's work in the Democratic Republic of the Congo.

Maison Des Jeunes, an album for Albarn's project Africa Express, was released in 2013. In 2014, Albarn appeared in the song "Go Back" in Tony Allen's albums Film of Life and The Source.

In a 2013 interview with Rolling Stone, Albarn announced that a forthcoming solo record would be produced by Richard Russell of XL Recordings. He also said he would be taking his album on tour, and that he would play songs from all of his other bands, including Blur and Gorillaz. Albarn's debut solo album, Everyday Robots, was released on 25 April 2014 to generally positive reviews. The album peaked at No. 2 on the UK charts and produced five singles: "Everyday Robots", "Lonely Press Play", "Hollow Ponds", "Mr Tembo", and "Heavy Seas of Love". It was nominated for the 2014 Mercury Prize for Best Album.

In 2018, Albarn collaborated with Kali Uchis, taking co-writing credits and performing on the song "In My Dreams", which appears on Uchis' album Isolation.

In June 2021, Transgressive Records announced that they had signed Albarn and would be releasing his second solo album, after which Albarn revealed the title The Nearer the Fountain, More Pure the Stream Flows and 12 November release date alongside the title track's release.

==== The Good, the Bad & the Queen ====
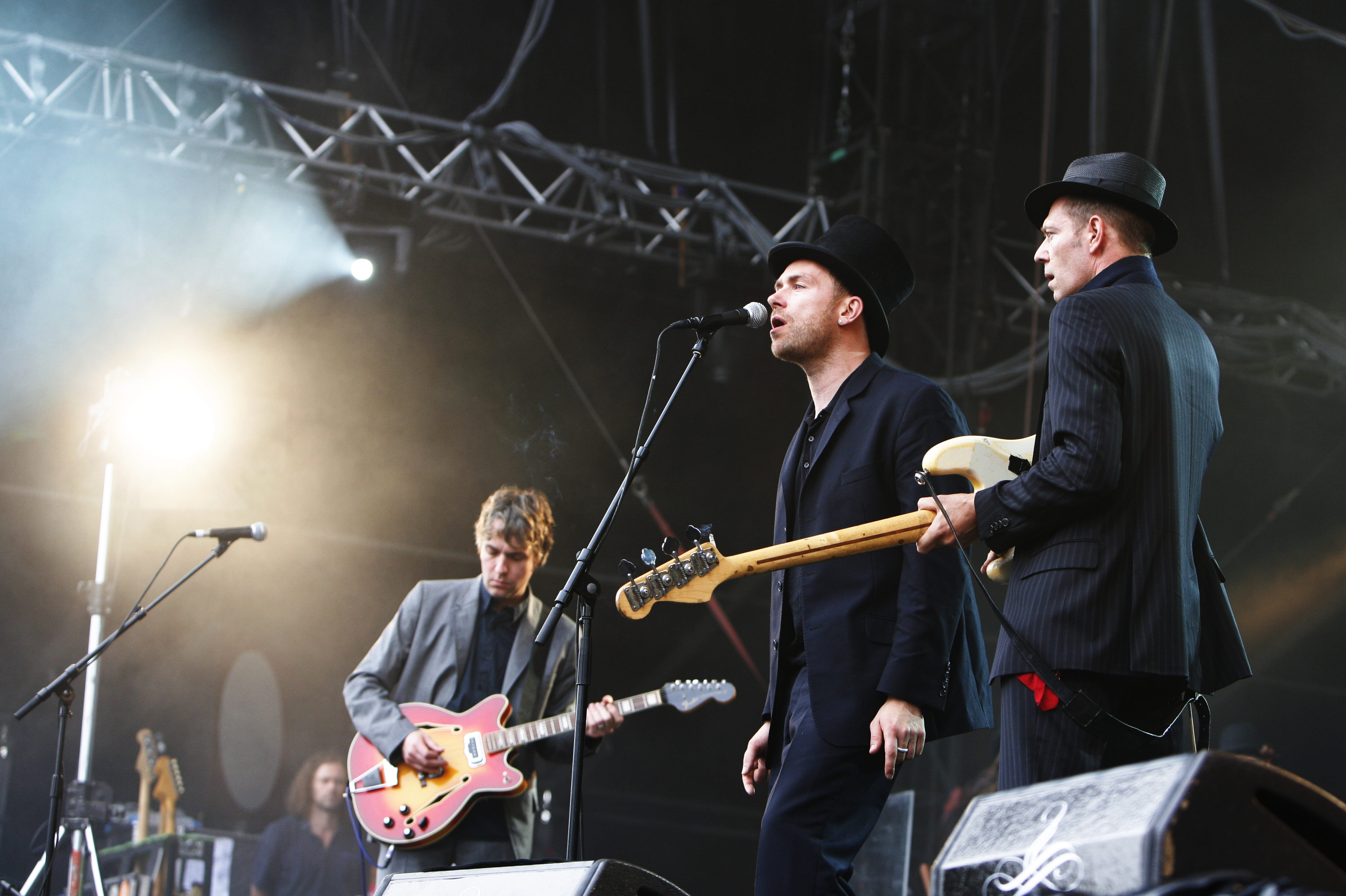
Albarn performing with the Good, the Bad & the Queen in 2007

In May 2006, NME reported that Albarn was working with Danger Mouse on his first solo album, with the group billed as the Good, the Bad & the Queen. It featured Paul Simonon, Simon Tong and Tony Allen. The album was awarded Best Album at the 2007 MOJO Awards on 18 June.

The first single by the line-up, "Herculean", was released in late October 2006, and peaked at No. 22 in the UK singles chart. A second single, "Kingdom of Doom", and the band's debut album were then released in January 2007. That single fared slightly better than "Herculean", peaking at No. 20, while the album peaked at No. 2 in the UK Albums Chart and went gold during its first week of release in the UK. "Green Fields" was released as the third single from the album in April 2007, just missing out on the Top 50. On 27 April 2008, the Good, the Bad & the Queen headlined the Love Music Hate Racism Carnival in Victoria Park where they introduced on stage several guests including ex-Specials keyboard player Jerry Dammers. He also worked with Syrian rapper and friend Eslam Jawaad on the song "Mr. Whippy", though the song does not appear on the album it is a B-side on the Herculean single.

==== Rocket Juice and the Moon ====
Rocket Juice & the Moon is the title of Albarn's side-project featuring Red Hot Chili Peppers bassist Flea and afrobeat legend Tony Allen. Albarn has stated that he is not responsible for the name; someone in Lagos did the sleeve design and that was the name it was given. Albarn has claimed that he is content with the outcome, as trying to come up with band names is difficult for him. The band performed together for the first time on 28 October 2011 in Cork, Ireland, as part of the annual Cork Jazz Festival. They performed under the moniker Another Honest Jon's Chop Up!. Their debut album was released on 26 March 2012.

==== Studio 13 ====
Albarn, along with Tom Girling and Jason Cox, established Studio 13, a recording studio for their own use, with the first projects at 13 being pre-production work for Blur's similarly-named album, as well as Albarn's contributions to the Ravenous soundtrack. Studio 13 has since been used not only for Albarn's projects, but also by other notable artists, including Paul Simonon, Jorja Smith, and others. The studio moved to a new, larger location in 2007.

==== Other projects ====
In 1998, Albarn and Michael Nyman recorded the song "London Pride" for the tribute album, Twentieth-Century Blues: The Songs of Noël Coward, a patriotic song Noël Coward had written in the spring of 1941 during the Blitz.

Collaboration with Terry Hall during 1994–2003: Having cited Hall as one of his early influences very often, Albarn and Hall went on and held a friendship for many years. They collaborated for multiple times including The Rainbows EP, in which Albarn co-wrote lead track "Chasing A Rainbow" with Hall. Later in Hall’s second solo album Laugh released in 1997, the two co-wrote "For The Girl" and "A Room Full Of Nothing". Hall also sang on a non-album track "911" by Gorillaz; they were both lead vocals on "Lil' Dub Chefin'" by Spacemonkeyz vs Gorillaz for both album and single version. In 2003, Hall and Mushtaq released The Hour of Two Lights, in which Albarn co-wrote and sang on the track "Ten Eleven". The album was also released on Albarn's label Honest Jon's Records in the UK.

In 2003, Albarn worked with the garage rock band the Strokes on their album Room on Fire. Producer Gordon Raphael claims that Albarn was experimenting with backing vocals on the record. In the end, however, Albarn's contributions did not make the record. "Well, I guess the songs are just perfect the way they are," Albarn stated. In the same year he performed "Fashion" live with David Bowie.

Albarn has contributed backing vocals to the songs "FM" on Nathan Haines' Squire for Hire and "Small Time Shot Away" on Massive Attack's 100th Window, which were released in 2003, however, for both tracks, credit was given to Gorillaz frontman 2-D instead. More recently, on Massive Attack's 2010 Heligoland album, he sang on the track "Saturday Come Slow" and contributed keyboards to the track "Splitting the Atom".

Albarn also produced soul singer Bobby Womack's twenty-seventh studio album The Bravest Man in the Universe, released in 2012. He recently performed on Jools Holland's Hootenanny on New Year's Eve, performing the track "Love is Gonna Lift You Up". Albarn appeared with Womack at the Glastonbury Festival 2013.

In 2016, Albarn appeared on De La Soul's studio album And the Anonymous Nobody... on the song "Here in After". Albarn had previously collaborated with the group on Gorillaz' albums Demon Days, Plastic Beach, and Humanz on the songs "Feel Good Inc", "Superfast Jellyfish", and "Momentz", respectively.

In 2017, Albarn sung with Alex Crossan (Mura Masa) on "Blu", the last track of their debut album.

In February 2025, Albarn contributed to Is This What We Want?, a fully silent album made by 1000 UK artists, in protest against copyright laws in the UK regarding artificial intelligence.

=== Film, theatre and soundtrack work ===
Albarn at the 2026 New York Film Festival for Artificial

"Closet Romantic" appeared on the soundtrack for Trainspotting alongside an early Blur recording, "Sing", which is from their debut album. Albarn composed the score with collaboration by Michael Nyman for the 1999 movie Ravenous, and was nominated for a Saturn Award for Best Music for his work.

In their first major work together since Gorillaz, Albarn and Hewlett, along with acclaimed Chinese theatre and opera director Chen Shi-zheng, adapted for stage the Chinese story Journey to the West as Monkey: Journey to the West, which received its world premiere as the opening show of the 2007 Manchester International Festival, on 28 June 2007 at the Palace Theatre, Manchester.

In collaboration with theatre director Rufus Norris, Albarn has created an opera for the 2011 Manchester International Festival based on the life of Elizabethan scientist John Dee and titled Doctor Dee.

Albarn recorded the film score for the film version of the book The Boy in the Oak, which was written by his sister, Jessica Albarn. The film was set for a spring 2011 release in select theatres.

In 2014, Albarn contributed the song "Sister Rust" to the soundtrack of science fiction film Lucy.

Albarn wrote the music for a musical based on Alice in Wonderland called Wonder.land with Rufus Norris and Moira Buffini, which officially premiered in the Manchester International Festival on 29 June 2015.

Albarn provided a track for the film The White Helmets called "Crashing Down", an abandoned track initially planned for the Gorillaz album Plastic Beach.

In 2026, Albarn revealed that he was working on the score to Luca Guadagnino's film Artificial.

=== The Heavy Seas ===
Albarn's live band is called the Heavy Seas, and features guitarist Seye, drummer Pauli the PSM, guitarist Jeff Wootton and Mike Smith on keyboards. Both Smith and Wootton had previously been a part of Gorillaz' Escape to Plastic Beach World Tour. With the exception of drummer Pauli, all members have played live with Gorillaz.

== Acting appearances ==
Albarn starred in Antonia Bird's 1997 film Face alongside Ray Winstone and Robert Carlyle. Albarn was also featured in Gunar Karlsson's 2007 film, Anna and the Moods, along with Terry Jones and Björk. Albarn played "Bull" in Joe Orton's Up Against It, a Radio 4 play originally written for the Beatles broadcast in 1998.

== Personal life ==
Albarn had a long-standing and publicised relationship with Elastica frontwoman Justine Frischmann from 1991 to 1998.

Albarn used heroin in the 1990s. In 2014, he said heroin had "freed him up" and made him "incredibly creative ... A combination of [heroin] and playing really simple, beautiful, repetitive shit in Africa changed me completely as a musician. I found a sense of rhythm. I somehow managed to break out of something with my voice." He became sober in later years. He referenced heroin in Blur lyrics.

Albarn began a relationship with the artist Suzi Winstanley in 1998. Winstanley gave birth to their daughter, Missy, named after rapper Missy Elliott, on 2 October 1999. Albarn described finally becoming a real father to a child as "witnessing a life force" and saying:

It massively changes you. It slowly sort of shaves off the unpleasant thorny bits and hopefully creates a nicely rounded... I don't know, having a kid, you just become far more, inevitably you look to the future far more and, you know, it's desperate sometimes when you have a particularly bad few weeks of the newspaper just reminding you about this is wrong, this is wrong. We've got ten more years everyone.

Albarn and Winstanley are speculated to have separated in 2023, with reviewers noting allusions to a breakup in the lyrics of Blur's ninth studio album The Ballad of Darren (2023). Albarn has declined to specify if these lyrics are related to his relationship status with Winstanley. However, in an interview with Paris Match, he stated that he had had a difficult breakup within the last few months, without mentioning anyone by name.

In 2006, Albarn was awarded an honorary Master of Arts degree from the University of East London, saying it was "great to receive [the] award from an institution where my dad used to work and which I, as a child, used to think of as that big building with lots of interesting people in".

In 2015, Albarn was made an Officer of the Most Excellent Order of the British Empire in the Queen's New Year Honours list of 31 December, which recognises British citizens for their achievements in public life and service to the United Kingdom. In 2016, Albarn, a long-time advocate of the music of Mali, titling his 2002 album Mali Music, has been given the title "Local King", and has had a school of music and dance named after him south of Bamako.

In 2020, Albarn was granted Icelandic citizenship. He visited Iceland in the mid-90s for recording and holidays, and subsequently bought a house in Reykjavík. Albarn has homes in the Notting Hill neighbourhood of London, and Devon.

Albarn is a fan of Chelsea F.C..

Albarn has said that he considers himself to be somewhere on the autism spectrum. Since 2023, he has discussed this in several interviews, associating it with his hyper-productivity and ability to juggle multiple musical projects, while acknowledging that it can also present challenges. He has described it as "a problem that I, that I choose not to approach as a problem," noting in Broken Record that he has chosen not to pursue a formal assessment.

=== Philanthropy ===
Albarn has been an active supporter of various charities and philanthropic efforts throughout his career as a musician and has been involved in various charity albums and singles. DRC Music, a collective formed by Albarn, released their debut album Kinshasa One Two as a charity album in which all of the money earned is given to Oxfam. Albarn has also formed a collective with Red Hot Chili Peppers bassist Flea, Yeah Yeah Yeahs guitarist Nick Zinner, and Franz Ferdinand frontman Alex Kapranos to make a charity single with the money earned from that single also donated to Oxfam. In 2013 Albarn, alongside fellow Blur bandmate Graham Coxon, performed live with former rival Noel Gallagher of Oasis and Paul Weller of The Jam to play Blur's 1999 single "Tender" in support of Teenage Cancer Trust.

== Politics and activism ==
In 2005, Albarn, among others, criticised the London Live 8 concert for not featuring enough black artists; among the few included were Ms. Dynamite, Snoop Dogg, and Youssou N'Dour. Eventually the organisers added a separate concert at the Eden Project in Cornwall to the programme to showcase African musicians. Albarn said he did not want to perform at Live 8 because he thought it was too "exclusive" and may have been motivated by self-promotion.

Albarn has been a vocal critic of celebrity culture, saying: "We need to dismantle very significant parts of our culture and really re-examine them. I suppose you start with the celebrity thing... you have to get rid of things like The X Factor immediately."

Albarn was a vocal critic of the United Kingdom's withdrawal from the European Union, describing it as "wrong" and saying that "it doesn't make any sense to [him] whatsoever". Albarn was a signatory on a 2018 editorial advocating for a "Citizen's Assembly" to resolve the parliamentary deadlock over withdrawal terms. Albarn stated that the Good, the Bad & the Queen album Merrie Land (2018) was inspired by Brexit and his reaction to it.

Albarn has been a vocal supporter of Palestinians, cancelling concerts in Israel following the Gaza flotilla raid in 2010 and played a concert at the Labour Friends of Palestine and the Middle East Gala Dinner in 2014. During Glastonbury Festival 2024, Albarn gave a pro-Palestine speech, labeling the Gaza war an "unfair war" and encouraging people to vote in the upcoming UK general election. Albarn performed at the Together for Palestine concert at Wembley Arena, organised by Brian Eno. Albarn criticised punk-rap duo Bob Vylan after frontman Bobby Vylan led a "Death, death to the IDF" chant during their performance at Glastonbury Festival 2025. Albarn described the incident as "one of the most spectacular misfires I’ve seen in my life. Especially when he started to goose-step in tennis gear. I mean I’ve had my moments — not quite as catastrophic as that but you do get carried away."

In an interview with El País as part of Gorillaz, Albarn declared: "I think we lean towards socialism, we are definitely 100% left-wing."

=== Anti-war activism ===
Albarn is anti-war, holding views shared by others in his family, including his grandfather Edward Albarn, who died during a hunger strike in 2002. In November 2001, shortly after the United States invasion of Afghanistan in response to September 11 attacks, the MTV Europe Music Awards were held in Frankfurt, where Gorillaz won awards for Best Song and Best Dance. As Albarn and Jamie Hewlett walked onto stage to make a speech after receiving the latter award, Albarn wore a T-shirt with the Campaign for Nuclear Disarmament logo on it. In his speech, he said:

"So, fuck the music. Listen. See this symbol here, [pointing to the T-shirt] this the symbol for the Campaign for Nuclear Disarmament. Bombing one of the poorest countries in the world is wrong. You've got a voice and you have got to do what you can about it alright?"

"Each individual has their own opinions about whether war is an answer to any problems. Personally I think it's a waste of time, but I think more importantly, that it's an issue that we haven't had any say in. That's why I feel so strongly about it. I don't feel like we've really been given any choice in this matter. I think if you had a referendum tomorrow, Tony Blair would have no choice but to call off the war."

— Albarn on Britain's involvement with the Iraq invasion

In 2002, Iraq was under threat of invasion from a United States-led coalition. Opposition to the planned invasion led to protests being organised by a number of organisations. Albarn spoke out against the invasion. Albarn teamed up with Robert "3D" Del Naja of Massive Attack and worked with Stop the War Coalition, CND and the Muslim Association of Britain to organise campaigns to oppose British involvement in the war. This included spending £15,000 on anti-war adverts which ran in the NME, featuring quotes from Tony Benn and the former US Attorney-General, Ramsey Clark.

Albarn revealed that originally, many people whom he knew were against the Iraq War were reluctant to take a stand, stating "to be honest with you when Robert Del Naja and myself started really stepping up prior to the war it was very difficult to find anyone. And I don't want to name any names because they are people who I respect but they were really, for some reason, very reticent to stand with us. A lot of people who you would now associate with being anti-war at that particular point didn't seem to be prepared to do it."

He was due to speak in Hyde Park on the rally in February 2003 when a million people took to the streets of London in protest at the imminent war. In the event, he was too emotional to deliver his speech. Albarn later revealed that he had "this image of my grandad in his slippers reading the paper, knowing that his grandson had been involved in something which he'd put so much of his life into" and "got over-emotional". He also stated that "it obviously wasn't the best moment to get in that state, when you're at the head of the biggest peace march in the history of this country." Albarn also attended a protest in November where he commented on the diversity of people in attendance, saying that "It represents everybody. It's the voice in our democracy and that's why we should be listened to." Speaking about the experience in 2008, Albarn stated:

I think in this case the only reason we went to war was the result of our individual apathy in the end. You know, our inability to really express what was I think was a consensus that this was a terrifying idea and a very badly thought-out one.

== Discography ==
Solo albums

- Everyday Robots (2014)
- The Nearer the Fountain, More Pure the Stream Flows (2021)

Collaboration albums

- Mali Music (2002) (with Afel Bocoum, Toumani Diabaté & Friends)
- The Good, the Bad & the Queen (2007) (with The Good, the Bad & the Queen)
- Kinshasa One Two (2011) (as part of DRC Music)
- Rocket Juice & the Moon (2012) (with Flea and Tony Allen as part of "Rocket Juice and the Moon")
- Maison Des Jeunes (2013) (as part of Africa Express)
- In C Mali (2014) (as part of Africa Express)
- The Orchestra of Syrian Musicians and Guests (2016) (with Africa Express)
- Merrie Land (2018) (with The Good, the Bad & the Queen)
- Molo (EP) (2019) (with Africa Express)
- Egoli (2019) (with Africa Express)
- Bahidorá (2025) (with Africa Express)

== Awards and nominations ==
=== Denmark GAFFA Awards ===
Year	Nominee / work	Award	Result
2022	Himself	International Solo Act	Pending
2022	The Nearer the Fountain, More Pure the Stream Flows	International Album	Pending

=== Mercury Prize ===
The Mercury Prize is a highly prestigious annual music prize awarded for the best album from the United Kingdom and Ireland. Nominations are chosen by a panel of musicians, music executives, journalists and other figures in the music industry in the UK and Ireland.

Year	Nominee / work	Award	Result
2014	Everyday Robots	Album of the Year	Nominated

=== Brit Awards ===
The Brit Awards are the British Phonographic Industry's annual popular music awards.

Year	Nominee / work	Award	Result
2013	Damon Albarn	British Producer of the Year	Nominated
2015	Damon Albarn	British Male Solo Artist	Nominated
