= Merrie Land =

Studio album by The Good, the Bad & the Queen
- Released: 16 November 2018
- Recorded: 2017–2018
- Studios: Studio 13, London, UK
- Genres: Folk; art rock; dub
- Length: 37:28
- Label: Studio 13
- Producers: Tony Visconti, The Good, the Bad & the Queen

The Good, the Bad & the Queen chronology
The Good, the Bad & the Queen (2007)	Merrie Land (2018)

Damon Albarn chronology
The Now Now (2018)	Merrie Land (2018)	Molo (2019)

Tony Allen chronology
The Source (2017)	Merrie Land (2018)	Rejoice (2020)

Paul Simonon chronology
Plastic Beach (2010)	Merrie Land (2018)	Can We Do Tomorrow Another Day? (2023)

Simon Tong chronology
Prospect of Skelmersdale (2016)	Merrie Land (2018)	Mirry (2020)

Singles from Merrie Land
- 1. "Merrie Land" Released: 23 October 2018; 2. "Gun to the Head" Released: 5 November 2018

Merrie Land is the second and final studio album by English art rock supergroup the Good, the Bad & the Queen. It was produced by Tony Visconti and released on 16 November 2018.

== Promotion ==
The band announced the album with the single "Merrie Land", and news that they would embark on a five-date tour of the UK in early December 2018. In an interview for The Scotsman, Albarn commented that the album is "a reluctant goodbye letter to the European Union following Brexit, and "a series of observations and reflections on Britishness in 2018." A video released for "Merrie Land" featured Albarn dressed as a ventriloquist's dummy, singing and gesturing in front of a backdrop of pastoral images and English landscapes.

The band released the second single from the album, "Gun to the Head", on 5 November 2018. The track features "organ, bassoon, recorder, and a British Invasion-style ensemble pop hook which lends the song a cheery boardwalk shine, undercut by Albarn's knotty lyrics of conspiratorial and repressive governance." The video released for "Gun to the Head" also featured Albarn dressed as a ventriloquist's dummy, but with backup dummies and a black backdrop. Three additional warm-up shows for the band in late November 2018 were announced alongside the release of the second single and its video.

== Recording ==
Sessions for the album started in January 2017, when Albarn, Simonon, and Tong spent time in Blackpool, which was originally going to be its main focus. However, Albarn expanded the focus of the album over the next two years while touring with Gorillaz for the albums Humanz and The Now Now.

In an interview with The Guardian, the band members admitted that Merrie Land shares creative attributes with its predecessor, The Good, the Bad & the Queen, but stylistically the two are dissimilar. Simonon characterised Merrie Land as "modern English folk music with a bit of rub-a-dub in it" while Allen noted, "this time around, people can dance". The interview, conducted by music critic John Harris, focused on the album's inspiration in the Brexit vote, and how that impacted the themes on Merrie Land. Where the band's first album was "murky" in its depiction of London, Merrie Land "evokes the contorted confusion of Brexit", and "widens its focus beyond the capital and has an even sharper sense of place." Simonon also highlighted the album's title as "kind of [alluding] to people's nostalgic, sentimental vision of how England used to be. And it never really existed."

== Artwork ==
The cover of the album features a shot of Michael Redgrave from the 1945 horror movie Dead of Night, in which he plays a ventriloquist taken over by his dummy.

== Reception ==
Professional ratings
Aggregate scores
Source	Rating
AnyDecentMusic?	7.2/10
Metacritic	77/100
Review scores
Source	Rating
AllMusic	4/5 stars
The Guardian	3/5 stars
The Independent	4/5 stars
The Irish Times	4/5 stars
Mojo	4/5 stars
NME	3/5 stars
Pitchfork	7.5/10
Q	4/5 stars
Rolling Stone	4/5 stars
Uncut	7/10

Reviews for the album were mostly positive, with The Independent calling the album "entertaining and theatrical" and stating that its lyrics "capture the social observation of [Blur album] Parklife", and Clash magazine labelling the album "curious twenty-first century folk about curious twenty-first century folk", adding that while Albarn's lyrics concerning Britain were a "proven formula", it was his collaboration with the rest of the band that made the album unique. At Metacritic, which assigns a normalised rating out of 100 to reviews from mainstream critics, the album received an average score of 77, indicating "generally favorable reviews". Some critics felt that the album was unfocused, with The Guardian stating that despite its rich instrumentation, its writing "never resolves into anything concrete". NME held a similar position, referring to it as "muddled" and stating that "beyond the title track and ‘Lady Boston’, it begins to wear thin quicker than a seagull nosediving to your soggy paper of chips". The Sunday Times named it ‘Album Of The Year’ for 2018 saying it is “…about England — Albarn perched, metaphorically, on the edge of the cliffs of Dover, his gaze focused not outwards but back, at a country he feels is about to plunge from them.”

== Track listing ==
All lyrics are written by Damon Albarn; all music is composed by Damon Albarn, Tony Allen, Paul Simonon, Simon Tong and Tony Visconti.

No.	Title	Length
1.	"Introduction"	0:13
2.	"Merrie Land"	4:46
3.	"Gun to the Head"	4:19
4.	"Nineteen Seventeen"	3:43
5.	"The Great Fire"	3:56
6.	"Lady Boston"	4:19
7.	"Drifters & Trawlers"	2:34
8.	"The Truce of Twilight"	4:22
9.	"Ribbons"	2:52
10.	"The Last Man to Leave"	2:38
11.	"The Poison Tree"	3:40
Total length:		37:28

Bonus tracks on Deluxe box set
No.	Title	Length
12.	"St. George And The Blackbird"
13.	"The Imperial"

Additional bonus tracks on Super Deluxe box set
No.	Title	Length
14.	"St. George And The Blackbird (Instrumental)"
15.	"The Imperial (Instrumental)"

Sample credits

- "Introduction" contains a sample of dialogue from the film A Canterbury Tale, as directed by Michael Powell and Emeric Pressburger.

== Personnel ==
Adapted from the Albums Liner Notes.

- Damon Albarn – lead vocal, lowery organ (2-8, 10, 11), piano (2, 3, 6-8, 11), recorder (3), mellotron (4, 7, 8, 10), theremin (4), arp quartet (5), farfisa (8), percussion (10), songwriting
- Paul Simonon – bass (all tracks), backing vocals, percussion (7), songwriting
- Simon Tong – guitar (all tracks), backing vocals, songwriting
- Tony Allen – drums (all tracks), songwriting
- Gareth Humphrey – bassoon (2, 3, 8, 10)
- Kate St. John – cor anglais (2, 9)
- Demon Strings – string quartett (2, 3, 4, 9-11)
- Gerry Diver – penny whistle (7)
- Tan Tan – trumpet (8)
- Chris Storr – trumpet (10, 11)
- Tony Visconti – producing, additional vocals (3), recorder (6, 7)
- Michael Rose – saxophone (8)
- Lucas Petter – trombone (8)
- Stephen Sedgwick – mixing
- John Davis – mastering
- Penrhyn Male Voice Choir - choir (6)

== Charts ==
Chart (2018)	Peak position
Austrian Albums (Ö3 Austria)	41
Belgian Albums (Ultratop Flanders)	55
Belgian Albums (Ultratop Wallonia)	106
French Albums (SNEP)	75
German Albums (Offizielle Top 100)	62
Irish Albums (IRMA)	35
Italian Albums (FIMI)	83
Scottish Albums (Official Charts)	26
Spanish Albums (PROMUSICAE)	86
Swiss Albums (Schweizer Hitparade)	30
UK Albums (Official Charts)	31
US Independent Albums (Billboard)	20
