= Herculean (song) =

Single by The Good, the Bad & the Queen featuring The Sixteen

from the album The Good, the Bad & the Queen
- B-side: "Back in the Day"; "Mr. Whippy"
- Released: 30 October 2006
- Recorded: 2005–2006
- Genre: Alternative rock
- Length: 3:59
- Label: Parlophone, Honest Jon's
- Songwriter(s): Damon Albarn
- Producer(s): Danger Mouse

The Good, the Bad & the Queen singles chronology
"Herculean" (2006)	"Kingdom of Doom" (2007)

"Herculean" is the debut single by the Good, the Bad & the Queen, an alternative rock band fronted by Damon Albarn. Though Albarn later claimed that the band was unnamed, and that "The Good, The Bad & The Queen" was merely the name of band's first album, this single clearly credits the artist as "The Good, The Bad & The Queen", and was released several months in advance of the album. At the time, neither Albarn nor anyone else was claiming the band was unnamed.

"Herculean" was first released as the band's debut single on 30 October 2006, following the band's performance at The Roundhouse in Camden on 26 October as part of the BBC's Electric Proms (see 2006 in British music). The single peaked at number 22 in the UK Singles Chart upon release, and was later released as the fifth track on the band's 2007 debut album The Good, the Bad and the Queen.

The song was released to the iTunes Store on 9 October 2006, and a stream of the song is available on the band's website. The artwork for the single was created by the band's bassist Paul Simonon.

== Track listings ==
- Promo CD
1. "Herculean" (radio edit)
2. "Herculean" (album version)
- 7" R6722
1. "Herculean" – 4:03
2. "Mr. Whippy" (featuring Eslam Jawaad) – 3:15
- Digipak Maxi-CD CDR6722
1. "Herculean" – 4:03
2. "Back in the Day" – 5:33
3. "Mr. Whippy" (featuring Eslam Jawaad) – 3:15

== Personnel ==
- Damon Albarn: vocals, piano, acoustic guitar
- Danger Mouse: synthesizers
- Simon Tong: electric guitar
- Paul Simonon: bass guitar
- James Dring: drum programming
- Tony Allen: drums
- Demon Strings: orchestration
- The Sixteen: additional vocals

== Chart performance ==
"Herculean" entered the UK Singles Chart at #22 in its first week of physical release (2006-11-05). The next week it retained a spot in the Top 75, at #72, but dropped out entirely the following week.

Chart (2006)	Peak position
UK Singles Chart	22
