= Paul Simonon =

English musician and artist (born 1955)

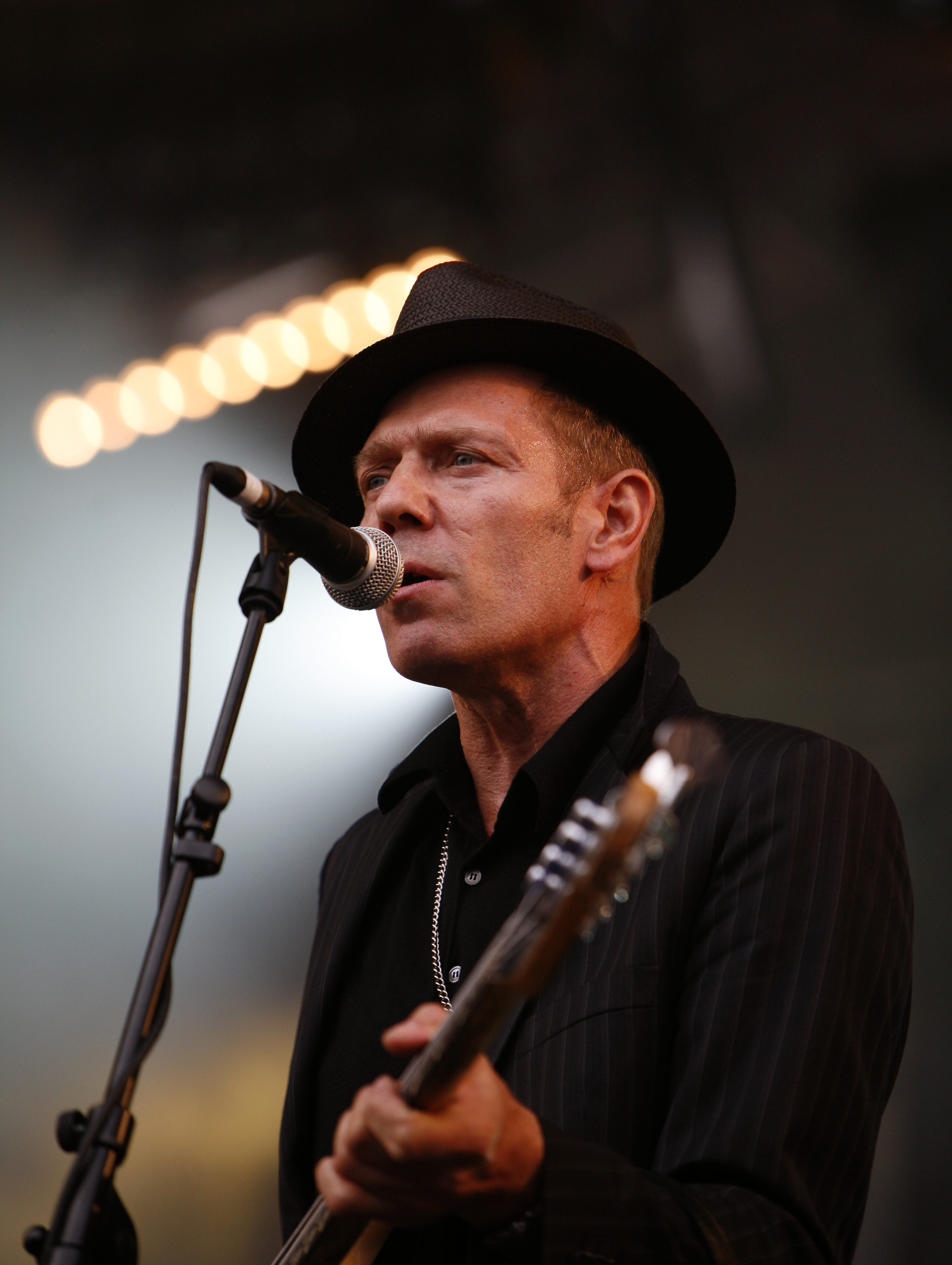
- Paul Simonon at the Eurockéennes 2007 with The Good, the Bad & the Queen

Background information
- Born: Paul Gustave Simonon; 15 December 1955 (age 70); Thornton Heath, Croydon, England
- Genres: Punk rock; new wave; post-punk; reggae; alternative rock; rock and roll
- Occupations: Musician; singer; songwriter; visual artist
- Instruments: Bass; vocals; guitar; harmonica
- Years active: 1976–1993, 2006–present
- Labels: CBS; Capitol; Parlophone
- Formerly of: The Clash; Havana 3am; The Good, the Bad & the Queen; Gorillaz

Paul Gustave Simonon (/ˈsɪmənən/; born 15 December 1955) is an English musician and artist best known as the bassist for the Clash. More recent work includes his involvement in the supergroup the Good, the Bad & the Queen and playing on the Gorillaz album Plastic Beach in 2010, which saw Simonon reunite with the Clash guitarist Mick Jones and Blur frontman Damon Albarn – and which also led to Simonon becoming the live band's touring bassist for Gorillaz's Escape to Plastic Beach Tour. Simonon is also an established visual artist.

== Early life ==
Simonon was born in Thornton Heath, Croydon, Surrey. (Note: AllMusic claims Simonon was born in Brixton.) His father, Gustave, was an amateur artist and his mother, Elaine, was a librarian. Simonon's paternal grandfather was a Belgian refugee who came to England during the First World War. Paul grew up in the London areas of Brixton and Ladbroke Grove. Before joining the Clash, he had planned to become an artist. He studied at Byam Shaw School of Art (then based in Campden St, Kensington), which he attended on a scholarship.

== Career ==
=== The Clash ===
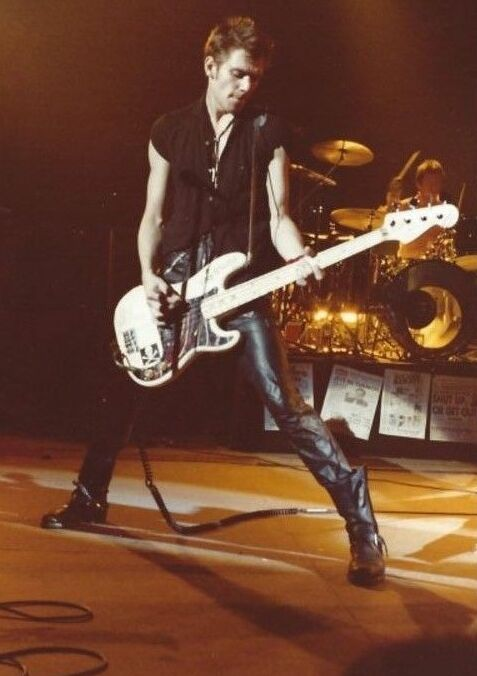
Simonon performing with the Clash at the New York City Palladium in 1979

In 1976, Mick Jones of protopunk band London SS was putting together a new band, inspired by the arrival of the Sex Pistols. London SS manager Bernard Rhodes recommended hiring Simonon due to his attitude and looks, despite Simonon not knowing how to play an instrument. Jones attempted to teach Simonon the guitar but gave up in a matter of hours and asked him to play bass instead. Six months later, the Clash was formed when vocalist and guitarist Joe Strummer completed the lineup. Strummer has since remarked that Simonon learned to play bass by playing along to the Ramones first album.

Simonon is credited with coming up with the name of the band and was mainly responsible for the visual aspects such as clothing and stage backdrops. Simonon was depicted on the front cover of the band's double album London Calling in Pennie Smith's now iconic photograph of him smashing his Fender Precision Bass guitar during a 1979 concert in New York City, undoubtedly one of the signature images of the punk era.

Simonon played bass on almost all of the Clash's songs. Recordings that he did not play on include: "The Magnificent Seven" and "Lightning Strikes (Not Once but Twice)" on Sandinista! (played by Norman Watt-Roy), "Rock the Casbah" on Combat Rock (played by Topper Headon), and Cut the Crap (played by Norman Watt-Roy). Sandinista! featured bass played by Jones or Strummer, some but possibly not all of which Simonon later re-recorded once he rejoined the sessions after filming Ladies and Gentlemen, The Fabulous Stains. Also, when performing "The Guns of Brixton" live he switched instruments with Joe Strummer, because it was easier for him to sing while playing guitar, instead of bass as he sings lead vocals on this track.

=== After the Clash ===
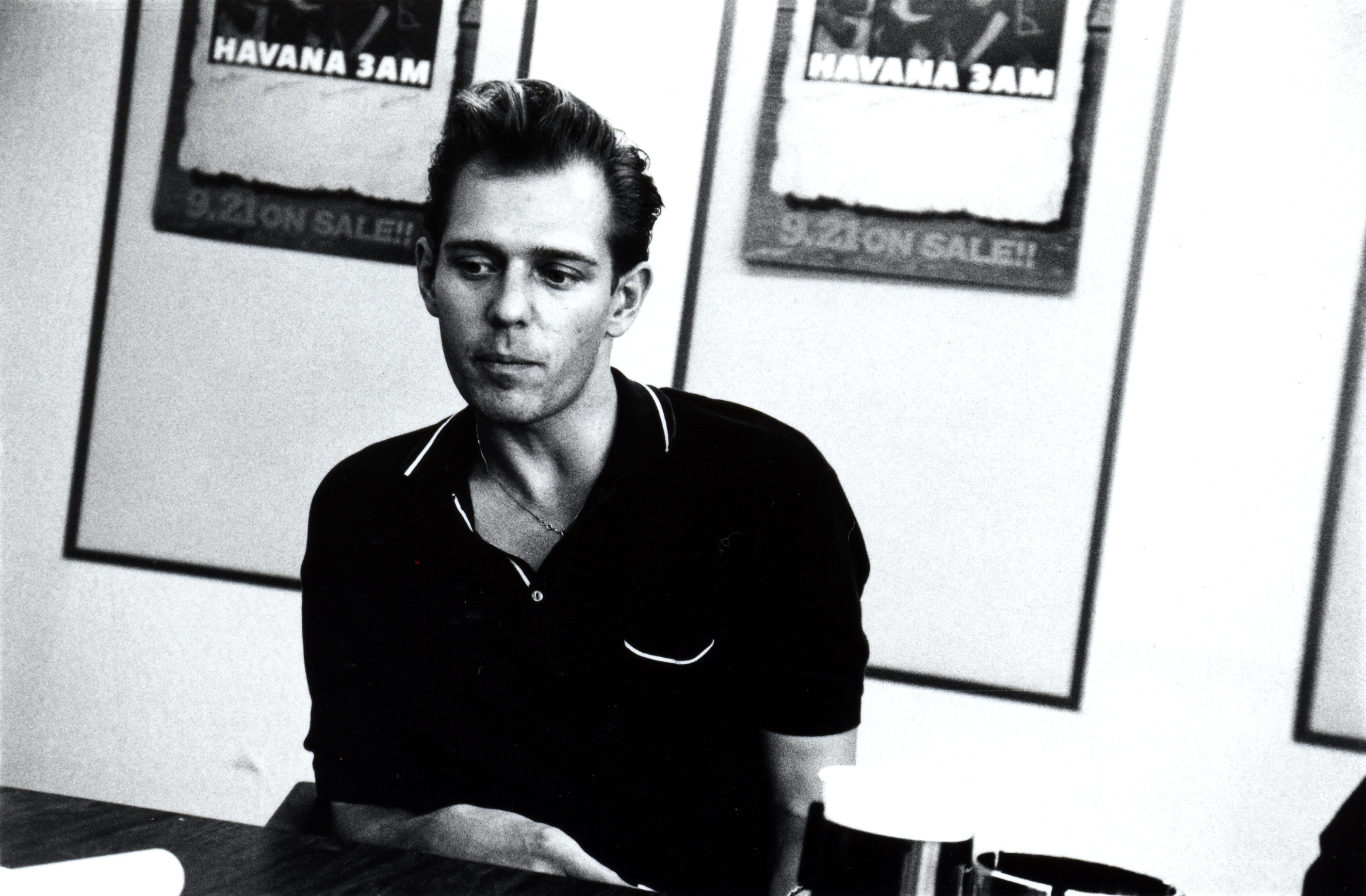
Simonon promoting the band Havana 3am in Tokyo, Japan

After the Clash dissolved in 1986, Simonon started a band called Havana 3am. He recorded one album with them. He also participated in a Bob Dylan session along with the Sex Pistols' Steve Jones that became part of the Dylan album Down in the Groove. Simonon also works as an artist – his first passion before joining the Clash. He has had several gallery shows, and designed the cover for Big Audio Dynamite's album, Tighten Up, Vol. 88, as well as the cover for "Herculean" from the album The Good, the Bad & the Queen, a project with Damon Albarn on which Simonon plays bass. Paul reunited with Damon Albarn and Mick Jones on the Gorillaz album Plastic Beach, and was also the bassist of the Gorillaz live band supporting Plastic Beach, along with Mick Jones on guitar. The band headlined the 2010 Coachella Festival, and took up residence at the Camden roundhouse for two nights in late April 2010.

In 2011, Simonon spent time aboard the Greenpeace vessel Esperanza incognito under the guise of "Paul the assistant cook" in response to Arctic oil drilling in Greenland by Cairn Oil. He joined other Greenpeace activists in illegally boarding one of Cairn's oil rigs; an action which earned him two weeks in a Greenland jail. His identity was revealed to other crew members after the voyage, and he joined Damon Albarn and the other members of the Good, the Bad & the Queen for a performance in London celebrating Greenpeace's 40th anniversary.

Actor Pete Morrow portrays Simonon in the 2016 film London Town. The film was met with mixed reviews.

In 2023, Simonon announced a new album, Can We Do Tomorrow Another Day?, in collaboration with singer Galen Ayers (daughter of Kevin Ayers). The project arose out of Simonon's time writing music in Mallorca during the COVID-19 lockdown and subsequently busking in front of cafes in Palma. The album was produced by Tony Visconti and featured a guest appearance by Damon Albarn. In 2024 he made a guest appearance with Patti Smith.

== Musicianship ==
Upon being recruited for the Clash, Simonon could not play an instrument. Jones unsuccessfully attempted to teach him guitar, and subsequently asked him to switch to bass, which Jones felt would be simpler to learn; he would later learn guitar and used the newfound skill to write "Guns of Brixton". Simonon, who idolized Pete Townshend of the Who, was initially disappointed by the switch and struggled in his attempt to learn the bass through playing along to Who records, as he could barely hear John Entwistle's parts over the guitar and drums. To keep up with his bandmates, Simonon painted notes on the neck of his bass and Jones would shout out the correct notes while the band performed. Simonon had greater success working out the basslines in reggae music—having grown up around London's Jamaican communities, he preferred how prominent and groove-oriented the basslines were in the genre: "Each bassline in Jamaican music, to me anyway, was a bit like how you move your feet. It's like how you dance to it." Simonon soon developed a contrapuntal reggae/ska-influenced style that set him apart from the bulk of other punk rock bassists of the era in the complexity and role of the bass guitar within the band.

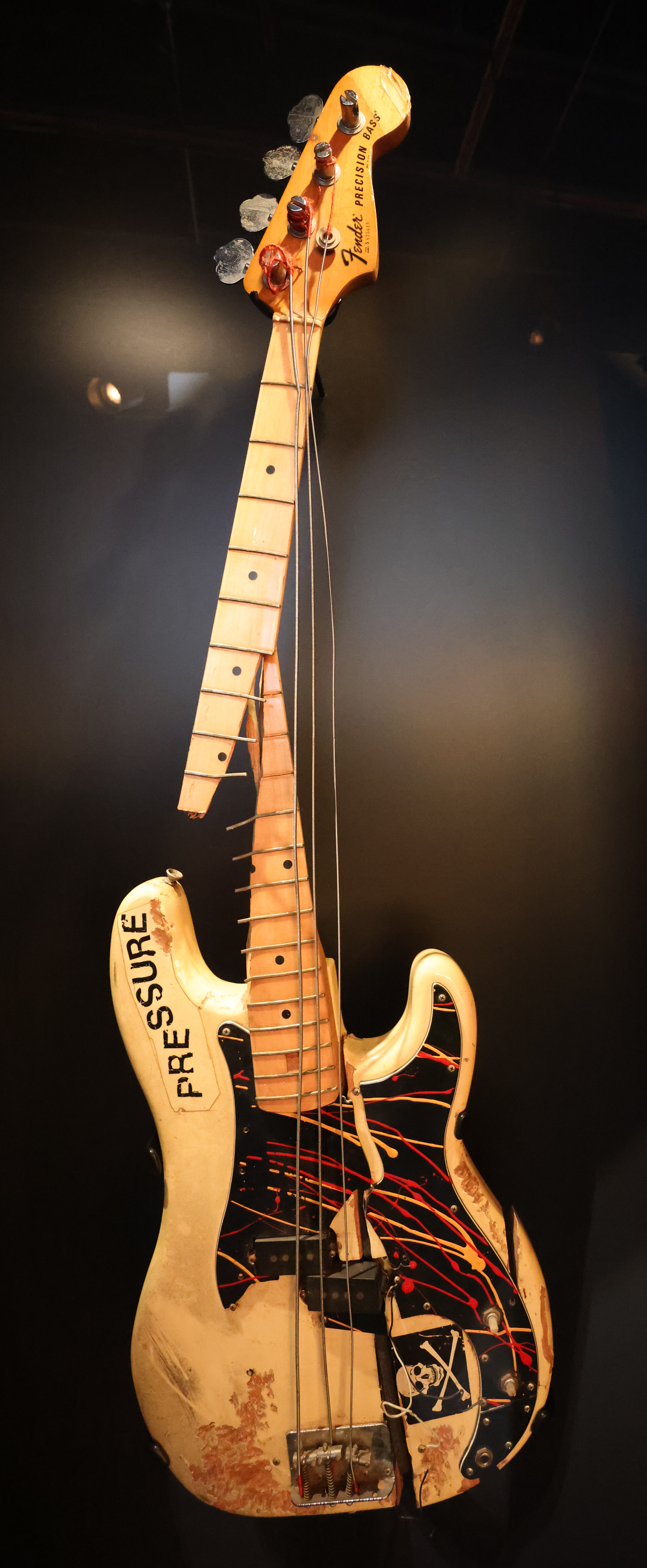
The white Precision Bass Simonon smashed in 1979, as depicted on the cover of London Calling.

Simonon primarily played a Fender Precision Bass into an Ampeg SVT. He was initially reluctant to play a white "P-Bass" he acquired as his main bass, since Sid Vicious and Dee Dee Ramone were already using white Precision Basses, but felt his had a uniquely "punchy" tone and hefty weight. He would use this bass—with a painted pickguard and the word "Pressure" inscribed on the body—as his main bass for live and studio use until smashing it at New York City's Palladium in 1979 out of frustration that the venue would not allow concertgoers to stand and dance to the music. A photograph of the moment captured by Pennie Smith was used for the cover of London Calling. Simonon quickly regretted destroying his favorite bass onstage, as he considered his backup Precision Bass inferior. He eventually found another pre-CBS era model, which he used from then on. The destroyed bass is on permanent display at the Museum of London as part of an exhibition on the city's history from the 1950s to the modern era.

== Discography ==
With the Clash

- The Clash (1977)
- Give 'Em Enough Rope (1978)
- London Calling (1979)
- Sandinista! (1980)
- Combat Rock (1982)
- Cut the Crap (1985)

With Havana 3 am

- Havana 3 am (1991)

With The Good, the Bad & the Queen

- The Good, the Bad & the Queen (2007)
- Merrie Land (2018)

With Gorillaz

- Plastic Beach (2010)
  Simonon reunites with Clash guitarist Mick Jones on the album's title track.
- The Mountain (2026)
  Simonon plays with Johnny Marr on "Casablanca".

With Galen & Paul (Galen Ayers & Paul Simonon)

- Can We Do Tomorrow Another Day? (2023)

== Art ==
=== Selected solo exhibitions ===
- From Hammersmith to Greenwich (2002)
- Paul Simonon Recent Paintings (2008)
- Wot no Bike, ICA Nash and Brandon Rooms (2015). To accompany the exhibition, Simonon published a limited edition hardback publication also titled Wot no Bike. Featuring 24 of the paintings, it includes an introduction by David Lancaster, a writer on classic bikes and culture and an interview between Simonon and Tim Marlow, Director of Artistic Programmes at the Royal Academy of Arts, London.

=== Selected group exhibitions ===
- John Martin Gallery (1996)
- Eyes of a Child (1998)
- Crusaid Edinburgh Art Centre (1998)
- Art Tube Exhibition London Underground (2001)
- Notting Hill Arts Exhibition (2001)
- Colony Room Show (2001)
