= The Good, the Bad & the Queen =

British supergroup

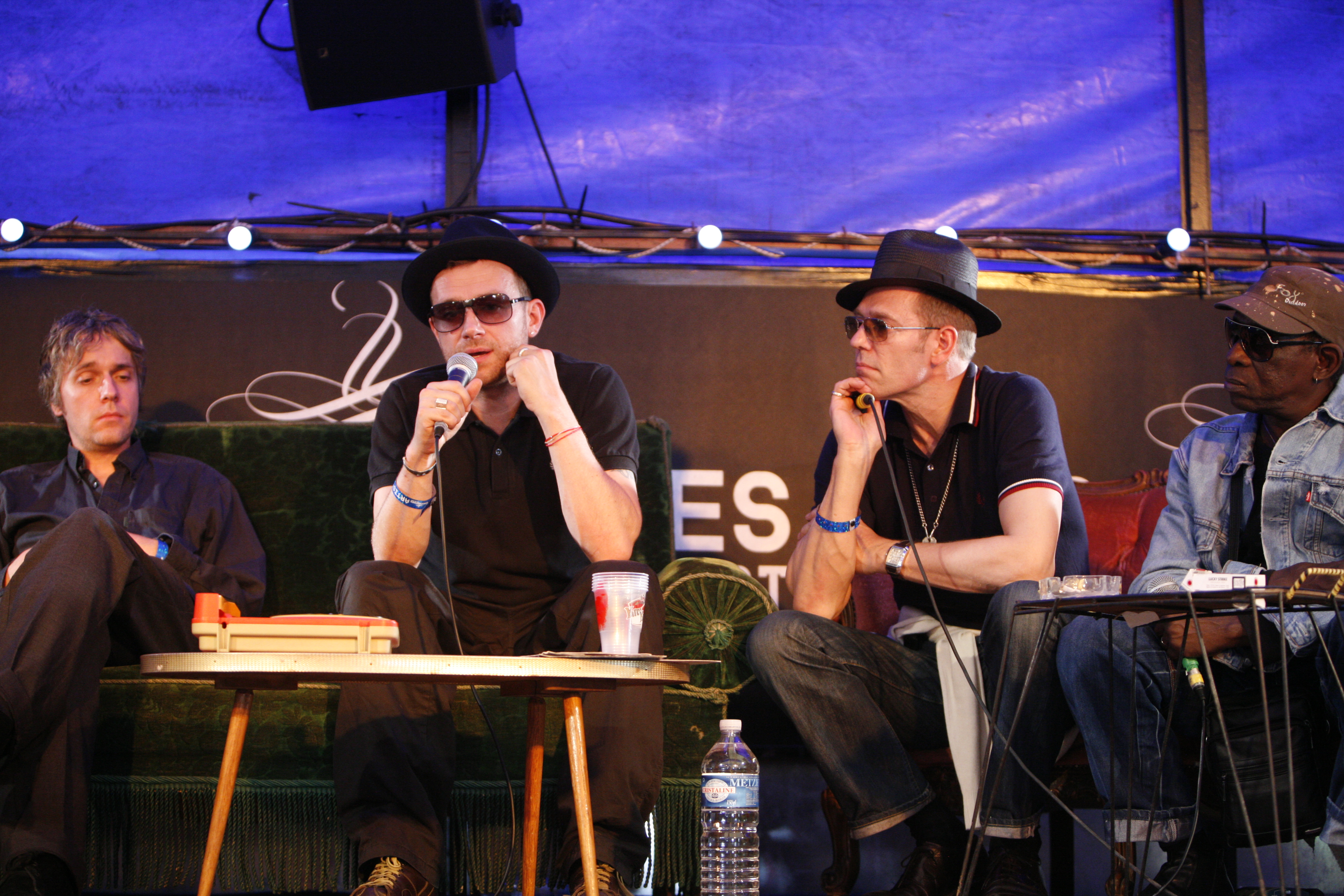
- The Good, the Bad & the Queen in 2007. From left to right: Simon Tong, Damon Albarn, Paul Simonon, Tony Allen.

Background information
- Genres: Art rock; art pop; folk; dub; reggae rock
- Years active: 2005–2008; 2011; 2014–2019
- Labels: Parlophone; Studio 13
- Past members: Damon Albarn; Paul Simonon; Simon Tong; Tony Allen
- Website: thegoodthebadandthequeen.com

The Good, the Bad & the Queen were an English art rock supergroup composed of singer Damon Albarn of Blur and Gorillaz, bassist Paul Simonon of the Clash, guitarist Simon Tong of the Verve, and drummer Tony Allen of Fela Kuti's band Africa '70. They released their self-titled debut album in 2007. Their second album, Merrie Land, coproduced with Tony Visconti, was released in 2018. They disbanded in 2019.

== History ==
=== Formation and debut album ===
The Good, the Bad & the Queen began as a solo project by Damon Albarn with production by Danger Mouse. However, by July 2006, the project had become a band, with bassist Paul Simonon of the Clash, guitarist Simon Tong of the Verve, and drummer Tony Allen of Fela Kuti's band Africa '70. Albarn met Simonon at the wedding of Clash singer Joe Strummer in 1997, and Tong had worked with Albarn on Blur's 2003 Think Tank tour, filling in as guitarist following the departure of Graham Coxon. Allen contacted Albarn after hearing the 2000 Blur single "Music Is My Radar", which references him.

The Good, the Bad & the Queen played their debut gig in a village pub in Devon on 20 October, followed by a performance at the London Roundhouse on 26 October as part of the BBC Electric Proms. They released their first single, "Herculean", on 30 October. On 12 December, the band performed a secret launch gig exclusive to 300 chosen fans for Myspace's new feature The List in Wilton's Music Hall, East London.

The band released their self-titled debut album on 22 January 2007. It was voted by the Observer Music Magazine as the Best Album of 2007. At this point, Albarn said The Good, the Bad & the Queen was only the album title and that the band was "nameless". Simonon said "we didn't properly name the band, because a name is for a marriage".

Albarn said the group had "permanently finished" in 2007; however, they reunited to perform at the 2008 Love Music Hate Racism carnival. Tong and Simonon appeared on Albarn's next project, the Gorillaz album Plastic Beach (2010), and participated in the Escape to Plastic Beach Tour. In November 2011, the Good, the Bad & the Queen played a show at London's Coronet Theatre for the 40th anniversary of Greenpeace, the first time they had played together in almost three years. Allen and Tong appeared on Albarn's soundtrack for the opera Dr Dee (2012), and Allen and Albarn collaborated on the 2012 album Rocket Juice & the Moon.

=== Merrie Land and disbandment ===
In October 2014, Albarn announced that a new album had been written and was waiting to be recorded. In April 2017, in a new interview with Q, it was reported that an album was still in the making but that recent events had caused the group to start afresh. Albarn told Q that Brexit had "given us a wonderful starting point".

Their second album, Merrie Land, produced by Tony Visconti, was released on 16 November, as “the right circumstances came about”, under the new label Studio 13 created by Albarn. Albarn described the album as "a series of observations and reflections on Britishness in 2018" and "a reluctant goodbye letter" following the Brexit vote.

The band performed the first gig for the album in Cullercoats on 26 November 2018, which was the start of an eight-date warm-up tour in UK. They toured Europe from March to August in 2019. At a performance at Lowlands Festival on 16 August 2019, the last show of the tour, Albarn told the crowd it would be the band's final performance. Allen died in April 2020.

== Discography ==
Studio albums

- The Good, the Bad & the Queen (2007)
- Merrie Land (2018)
