= Live at the De De De Der =

Live album by Damon Albarn and the Heavy Seas
- Released: 15 and 16 November 2014
- Recorded: 15 and 16 November 2014
- Venues: Royal Albert Hall in London, England
- Genre: Alternative rock
- Length: 2:08:01 (15 Nov); 2:09:48 (16 Nov)
- Label: Parlophone
- Producers: Will Shapland, Matt Butcher

Damon Albarn chronology
Everyday Robots (2014)	Live at the De De De Der (2014)	Terry Riley's In C Mali (2014)

Damon Albarn solo chronology
Everyday Robots (2014)	Live at the De De De Der (2014)	Songs from wonder.land (2016)

Live at the De De De Der is the name of two live albums by English musician Damon Albarn, recorded by Abbey Road Studios during his two consecutive dates at the Royal Albert Hall in London on the 15 and 16 November 2014, available for sale immediately after each show. The performances feature Albarn's band The Heavy Seas, and include guest appearances by artists such as Brian Eno, De La Soul, Kano, and Albarn's Blur bandmate Graham Coxon. The albums feature songs from a number of Albarn's projects, including songs by Gorillaz, Blur, The Good, the Bad & the Queen, and Mali Music. The albums were released exclusively for sale at the two performances and on the Abbey Road Studios website. Damon Albarn's long-term partner Suzi Winstanley designed the front cover.

== Track listing ==
Track listing and guest appearances are identical for both performances. Song lengths listed are according to the November 16 performance.

Disc one
No.	Title	Original artist	Length
1.	"Spitting Out the Demons"	Gorillaz	5:01
2.	"Lonely Press Play"	Damon Albarn	4:31
3.	"Everyday Robots"	Damon Albarn	4:06
4.	"Tomorrow Comes Today"	Gorillaz	4:01
5.	"Slow Country"	Gorillaz	4:30
6.	"Kids with Guns"	Gorillaz	4:11
7.	"Three Changes"	The Good, the Bad & the Queen	5:15
8.	"Bamako City" (featuring Afel Bocoum and Madou Sidiki Diabaté)	Mali Music	6:30
9.	"Sunset Coming On" (featuring Afel Bocoum and Madou Sidiki Diabaté)	Mali Music	6:08
10.	"Hostiles"	Damon Albarn	5:05
11.	"Photographs (You Are Taking Now)"	Damon Albarn	4:39
12.	"Kingdom of Doom"	The Good, the Bad, & the Queen	3:14
13.	"You and Me"	Damon Albarn	8:23
14.	"Hollow Ponds"	Damon Albarn	5:29

Disc two
No.	Title	Original artist	Length
1.	"El Mañana"	Gorillaz	4:44
2.	"Don't Get Lost in Heaven"	Gorillaz	2:33
3.	"Out of Time"	Blur	2:26
4.	"All Your Life"	Blur	6:26
5.	"End of a Century" (featuring Graham Coxon)	Blur	5:18
6.	"The Man Who Left Himself" (featuring Graham Coxon)	Blur	3:31
7.	"Tender" (featuring Graham Coxon)	Blur	8:38
8.	"Mr. Tembo" (featuring The Leytonstone City Mission Choir)	Damon Albarn	5:44
9.	"Clint Eastwood" (featuring Kano)	Gorillaz	6:40
10.	"Feel Good Inc." (featuring De La Soul)	Gorillaz	6:31
11.	"Heavy Seas of Love" (featuring Brian Eno, The Leytonstone City Mission Choir and Madou Sidiki Diabaté)	Damon Albarn	6:23

== Personnel ==
The Heavy Seas

- Damon Albarn - lead vocals, guitars, melodica, piano
- Mike Smith - piano, keyboards, backing vocals
- Jeff Wootton - lead guitar, six string bass, backing vocals
- Seye Adelekan - bass guitar, ukulele, rhythm guitar, backing vocals
- Pauli Stanley-McKenzie - drums, percussion, backing vocals

The Heavy Seas Choir

- Angel Williams-Silvera
- Teni Abosende
- Cherrelle Rose
- Tsega Tabege
- Geo Gabriel
- Lawrence Rowe

Demon Strings

- Izzi Dunn
- Antonia Pagulatos
- Kotono Sato
- Stella Page

Guest artists

- De La Soul
- Graham Coxon
- Kano
- Afel Bocoum
- Madou Sidiki Diabaté
- Richard Russell
- Brian Eno
- Kaktus Einarsson
- The Leytonstone City Mission Choir
