= Everyday Robots =

2014 debut studio album by Damon Albarn

Studio album by Damon Albarn
- Released: 25 April 2014
- Recorded: 2011–2013
- Studios: Studio 13, London, England
- Genres: Art pop; trip hop; folktronica; experimental rock
- Length: 46:32
- Labels: Parlophone; Warner Bros
- Producers: Damon Albarn; Richard Russell

Damon Albarn chronology
Maison Des Jeunes (2013)	Everyday Robots (2014)	Live at the De De De Der (2014)

Damon Albarn solo chronology
Dr Dee (2012)	Everyday Robots (2014)	Live at the De De De Der (2014)

Singles from Everyday Robots
- 1. "Everyday Robots" Released: 3 March 2014; 2. "Lonely Press Play" Released: 27 February 2014; 3. "Hollow Ponds" Released: 19 April 2014; 4. "Mr Tembo" Released: 16 April 2014; 5. "Heavy Seas of Love" Released: 27 April 2014

Everyday Robots is the debut solo studio album by English musician Damon Albarn, best known as the frontman of Blur and Gorillaz. Described by Albarn as his "most personal record", the album was co-produced by Richard Russell and released on 25 April 2014. It features guest contributions from musician and producer Brian Eno, singer Natasha Khan and the Leytonstone City Mission Choir. It was nominated for the 2014 Mercury Prize for best album.

The album produced five singles: "Everyday Robots", "Lonely Press Play", "Hollow Ponds", US-only release "Mr Tembo", and "Heavy Seas of Love". Everyday Robots received positive reviews from music critics, and debuted at number two on the UK Albums Chart.

== Background ==
The album was first announced in September 2011, when Albarn had confirmed he was working on a solo studio album to be released under his own name. He also stated that the concept of which is supposed to revolve around "empty club music". In a 2013 interview with Rolling Stone magazine, he said that the record would have a sound that he describes as a combination folk music and soul music. He also stated that he will be taking his album on tour, during which he will play songs from all of his other bands, such as Blur, Gorillaz and The Good, the Bad & the Queen.

In May 2012, Albarn told NME that he was recording a new solo studio album. Asked what he was currently working on, Albarn said: "This week we're mucking around with these Russian synthesizers in a very loose mind of doing some kind of record under my name. I suppose you could call it a solo record, but I don't like that word. It sounds very lonely – solo. I don't really want to be solo in my life. But yeah, I'm making another record."

On 18 January 2014, the Warner Music Store was updated to include Damon Albarn's new album and its name was revealed – Everyday Robots, which is also the name of the first single, set to be released as a limited edition 7" vinyl on 3 March along with a non-album B-side, "Electric Fences". The deluxe edition of the album will come packaged with a DVD of Albarn performing a few album tracks live at Fox Studios in Los Angeles. The DVD was filmed on 3 December 2013. Albarn himself said in his official Facebook page that this record is his most soul-searching and autobiographical yet, explores nature versus technology and features guests Brian Eno and Natasha Khan, professionally known as Bat for Lashes. The official promo video for the first single, "Everyday Robots", was directed by artist and designer Aitor Throup, and posted on the singer's YouTube page on 20 January.

The album was made available for free streaming on iTunes on Tuesday 22 April 2014, whereby people could listen to the standard edition of the album in its entirety, which is a similar strategy used by Justin Timberlake for his albums The 20/20 Experience & The 20/20 Experience – 2 of 2 and Daft Punk's Random Access Memories.

Episode four of the Craig Cash sitcom After Hours is titled Lonely Press Play, and the song features in the episode.

== Recording ==
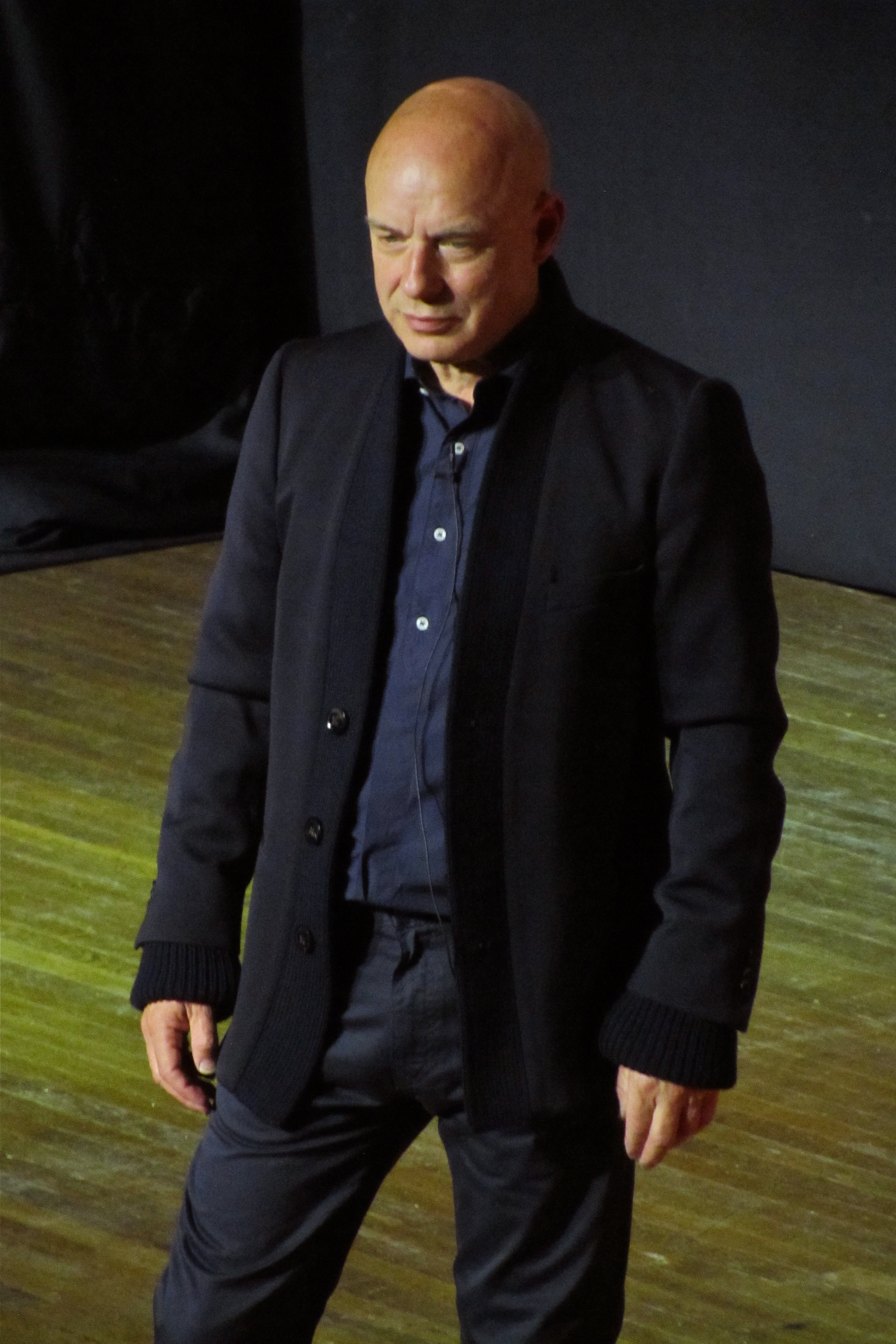
Brian Eno contributes synthesizers and backing vocals to "You and Me" and guest vocals on the song "Heavy Seas of Love".

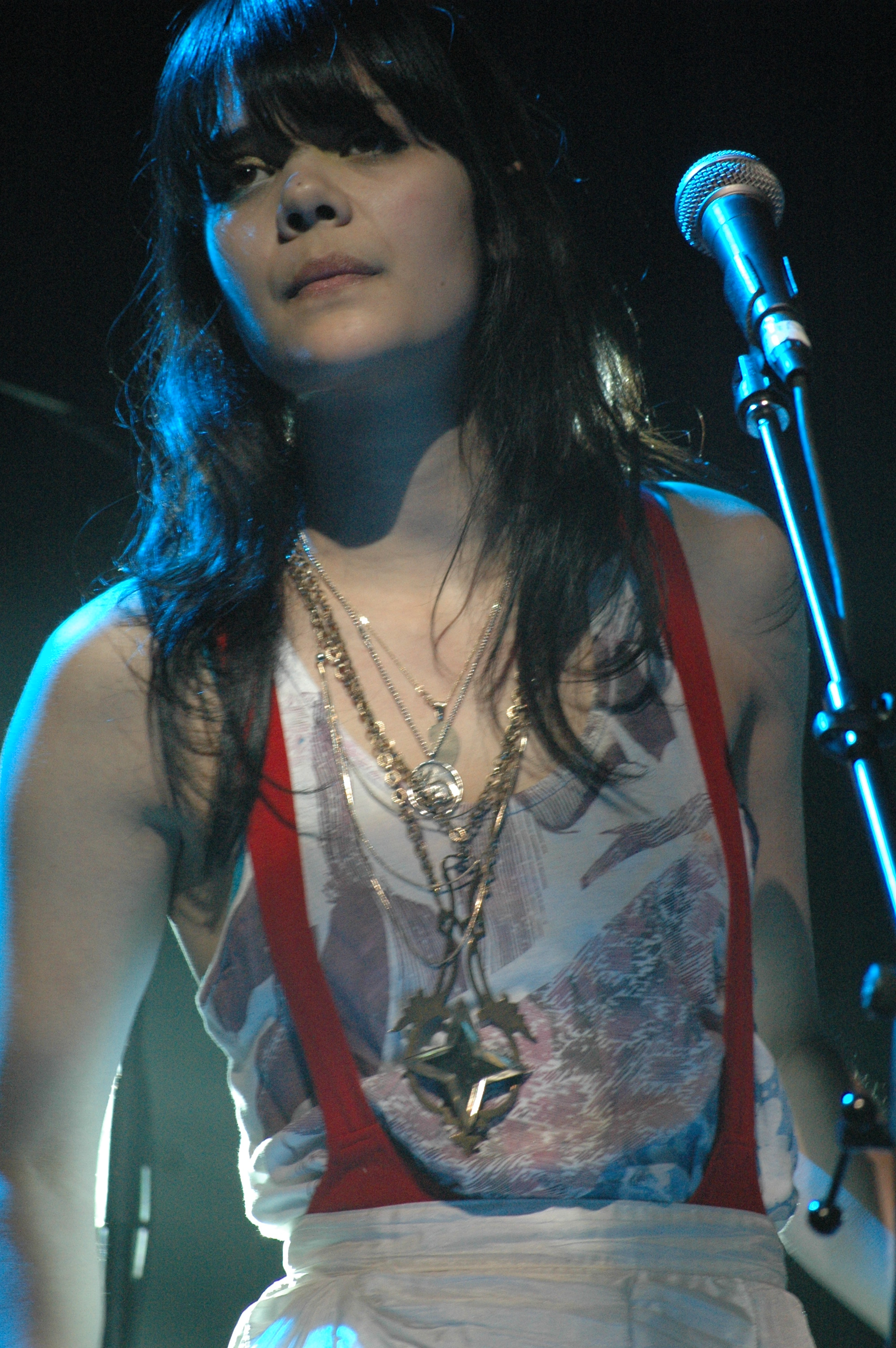
Natasha Khan (Bat for Lashes), appears on "The Selfish Giant"

In a January 2014 interview with Rolling Stone, Albarn revealed that Natasha Khan would appear on the track "The Selfish Giant" as a "ghostly echo", and that Brian Eno had collaborated on the album's final track. He also revealed that the track "Mr Tembo" was recorded for a baby elephant that Albarn met in a zoo in Mkomazi, Tanzania. He said: "It was recently orphaned and walked onto this aerodrome; the people I know took it in and called it Mr. Tembo. I was there, and I met this little elephant, and he was very sweet. I sang it to him." The track was played for the elephant in a demo form by Albarn and Paul Simonon, and recorded over a phone call between Albarn and Richard Russell.

As for the recording process of the album, Albarn started it with nearly 60 songs written down, and then would allow co-producer Richard Russell to pick his favourites, which would then become tracks on his album.

In an interview with NME about the album, Albarn explained that the lyrics were "the hardest part". He commented: "The lyrics were the hardest part. The music… leans towards my more melancholic, introspective soulful side, which is where I love to sing, but lyrically it took me a long time. I wanted it to be about my life, in a way, and I went right back to... it sort of starts in 1976." He added that every song on the record is rooted in a real life experience, saying: "every line on this record happened". The album will also tackle other issues such as "nature versus technology"

Addressing working with The Leytonstone City Mission Choir, Albarn felt that the choir held a nostalgic importance to him and asked the Church if he could record with the choir, "Back in Leytonstone, there was a Pentecostal Church at the end of my road that belonged to the city mission. I remember standing outside with my bicycle listening to the singing, but never being able to find an entry point. But it was a very strong childhood memory that I've carried with me. I got in contact with that church, and they've still got a small choir, so they very kindly agreed to sing on the record a bit."

Co-producer Richard Russell stated: "It's definitely a different sound to anything he's had before. He's been very conceptual for the past few records he's done whereas this is one is just a personal record that's about him. He worked very hard to express things that were very personal but to do it in an interesting way. That's what makes the record him. He brought me in to create a particular atmosphere and particular mood, so it's quite an atmospheric record with a certain palate of sounds and a certain rhythmic feel and very personal stuff." "Heavy Seas of Love", with Brian Eno and The Leytonstone City Mission Choir, was played live by Albarn at a YouTube event, however the original studio version also leaked online. The single was streamed via Tribecaon Tribeca.

Russell handled the drum programming while Albarn took on the singing, piano and guitar parts. "We did it in just three months at my studio," Albarn said of the process. "We'd work five days a week, 10:00 a.m. until 6:00 p.m." The drums and percussion on the record are from a musical instrument that Russell had picked up from Kinshasa in the Democratic Republic of Congo, which is made mostly of plastic and metal, a modified version of which can be seen on DRC Music's Kinshasa One Two record.

The song "Hollow Ponds" was played in its full form on XFM on 20 March 2014. On 24 March 2014 Albarn released "Heavy Seas of Love" in its full studio format without the audio watermark on the track, and released the single art cover as well. The cover art is of the Palacio Salvo in Plaza Independencia in Uruguay

== Lyrics ==
As stated in many interviews, the record will be "the most personal record I have ever done", the record also focuses on the idea of nature versus technology, and will tell certain significant moments in Albarn's life, including: "Hollow Ponds", which referenced key dates in Albarn's life, including the 1976 summer drought.

The album's first single "Everyday Robots", opens with the lyric: "We are everyday robots on our phones" – makes it clear this particular track focuses on the nature/technology dichotomy as opposed to anything deeply personal, as reported by Michael Cragg, of The Guardian. The track contains a sample of "The Gasser" by Lord Buckley, from his 1960 album "Best of Buckley", the sample itself is a hipsemantic rant about 15th Century Spanish Explorer, Álvar Núñez Cabeza de Vaca, who was a part of the Narváez expedition. The song opens with Buckley's lines of "They didn't know where they was going, but they knew where they was, wasn't it" The sample is used to question the position of humans in modern-day Earth. "They" are humans, in which Albarn claims that we know where we are right now but because of the violent and dramatic evolution of technology, we have no idea what could happen in the next few years.

"Lonely Press Play", the album's second single, features the lyrics: "'Cause you're not resolved in your heart, you're waiting for me, to improve, right here, when I'm lonely, I press play", which talks about isolation and the feeling of being alone. The song was previewed on Albarn's Culture Show documentary, and the Sundance Festival and is the album's second official single.

== Promotion ==
A series of trailers also appeared on Albarn's YouTube account as a way of promoting the album. The trailers featured a lot of images, mainly from Albarn's past and his previous projects. As well as a 21-second clip which featured Albarn at the piano and, before showing the title: Damon Albarn. First Solo Album. Coming Soon

Albarn premiered, "Lonely Press Play" at YouTube's pop-up venue at the Sundance Film Festival on 19 January. The invitation-only performance included acoustic versions of songs from the record itself as well as El Mañana by Gorillaz and an as of yet unknown Blur track. Albarn also played the song on Dermot O'Leary's BBC Radio 2 show, in a more "stripped-back acoustic" performance and also performed a cover of Terry Jacks' "Seasons in the Sun" And also previewed the song "Heavy Seas of Love" featuring Brian Eno and The Leytonstone City Mission Choir as well.

Albarn was the subject of a half-hour episode of The Culture Show broadcast on BBC Two in February 2014, which focused on his previous bands and his current work. In the programme he returned to his former homes in Leytonstone, East London, and Colchester, Essex. Speaking in the programme, he revealed that he found his first solo LP tough, saying: "I've spent so long in bands, playing to large groups of people, that doing a solo album is quite a difficult thing for me to do. That's why I put it off for so long". The documentary included clips of songs from his album as well, including "Hollow Ponds", "Hostiles" and "Mr Tembo".

Albarn also won the award for Innovation at the 2014 NME Awards and was presented with the award by Radio 1 DJ Zane Lowe. The awards took place at the O2 Academy Brixton in London and were hosted by BBC Radio 1 presenter and NME columnist Huw Stephens.

Although the record will be released under his name, he said he wanted himself and his backing band to be known as The Heavy Seas. The band's first performance was at BBC Radio 6 Festival. The gig saw the first exclusive plays of songs such as "The Selfish Giant" and "Mr Tembo", Albarn also played Tomorrow Comes Today from Gorillaz eponymous debut album and The Good, the Bad & the Queen single "Kingdom of Doom" as well as "El Mañana" from Demon Days and the Blur B-Side "All Your Life". Albarn and Kelis were among the acts that performed at the BBC Radio 6 Music Festival on Friday 28 February.

Albarn performed at the SXSW Festival in Austin, Texas, which was streamed live at NPR's website, as well as performing on the American TV Show, Jimmy Kimmel Live! and performed the singles "Lonely Press Play", and "Mr Tembo".

At the festival Albarn played various Gorillaz songs, including "Feel Good Inc" in which he was joined onstage by De La Soul. He also performed the hit song "Clint Eastwood" with the song's original collaborator Del the Funky Homosapien, marking the first time Albarn and Del played the song live together, being joined on stage by Dan the Automator and Snoop Dogg. "Tomorrow Comes Today", "Kingdom of Doom" and "All Your Life" were also performed during the festival.

Albarn played a series of "intimate gigs" in support of the album at the Rivoli Ballroom in Crofton Park on 30 April, followed by a show at the People's Palace in Mile End on 1 May, in which he played songs from many of his bands. Albarn also headlined the Saturday night of Latitude Festival, which took place between 17 and 20 July. He also played the Bonnaroo Music and Arts Festival in Tennessee, USA, 12–15 June. Tickets went on sale Saturday 22 February 2014.

Albarn also played Rock Werchter – which took place in Belgium 3–6 July. Albarn also played the Days Off Festival in Paris, France, on 9 July. Tickets went on sale on 6 March. Albarn headlined 2014's EXIT Festival in Serbia. He also topped the bill on the main stage on 12 July, joining a line-up that also included Disclosure, Rudimental and Skrillex. The event took place from 10 to 13 July 2014 at the Petrovaradin Fortress in Novi Sad. Albarn also appeared at the Fuji Rock Festival in Japan on 25–27 July 2014.

Albarn also appeared on the BBC TV programme Later...with Jools Holland on 2 May 2014 along with Coldplay, The Black Keys, Sharon Jones & The Dap-Kings & Aziza Brahim

Albarn was shortlisted for the 2014 Mercury Prize Award and performed at the live ceremony in which he performed "Hostiles". All nominees performed at the ceremony Albarn and Royal Blood's performances were the most well received performances of the evening. However, Albarn ended up losing the award to Edinburgh based hip-hop trio Young Fathers for their 2014 album Dead.

=== The Heavy Seas ===
Albarn's live band is called The Heavy Seas, and features guitarist Seye, drummer Pauli the PSM, guitarist Jeff Wootton and Mike Smith on keyboards. Both Smith and Wootton had previously been a part of Gorillaz' Escape to Plastic Beach World Tour. On 15–16 November 2014, Albarn & The Heavy Seas' performances at the Royal Albert Hall were recorded to be edited into a live album. The project was released as a two-disc album called Live at the De De De Der; it contains seven songs from Everyday Robots performed by Albarn and guest musicians, including De La Soul, Graham Coxon and Afel Bocoum.

== Singles ==
The first single from the record, is the title track, and was released on 3 March 2014.

The second single for the album was "Lonely Press Play", which was officially made available on iTunes. and had a music video that was released on 27 February 2014.

The album's third single is "Hollow Ponds" and was released on 19 April 2014, ten days before the release of the album itself. It is unknown if there will be a music video for the track.

The fourth single is "Mr Tembo", which features The Leytonstone City Mission Choir, the single was released purely in the US. On Tuesday 22 April guitarist Seye, tweeted that Albarn and his live band The Heavy Seas were filming a music video for the song.

The fifth single from the record is "Heavy Seas of Love" featuring Brian Eno and The Leytonstone City Mission Choir and will be released on 27 April 2014. On. Tuesday 22 April 2014 a music video was released, shot in the same vein as the "Lonely Press Play" music video. Neither Eno nor The Leytonstone City Mission Choir appear in the video.

== Release ==
The album is currently available for order on iTunes, in two editions: the standard edition of the album, which features the standard twelve tracks, and the "Special Edition", which features two bonus tracks, "Father's Daughter's Son" and "Empty Club", as well as a DVD Bonus which features live performances of "Everyday Robots", "Hostiles" and "Hollow Ponds", as well as a track-by-track interview with Albarn himself. The album is also available for order from Albarn's official website and other high-street retailers including Amazon. The album is also available in the form of a double LP Vinyl copy of the record, which the 12 tracks are split between two records.

== Critical reception ==
Professional ratings
Aggregate scores
Source	Rating
AnyDecentMusic?	7.6/10
Metacritic	76/100
Review scores
Source	Rating
AllMusic	4/5 stars
The Daily Telegraph	4/5 stars
The Guardian	4/5 stars
The Independent	4/5 stars
Los Angeles Times	3/4 stars
NME	8/10
Pitchfork	7.0/10
Q	4/5 stars
Rolling Stone	4/5 stars
Spin	8/10

Everyday Robots received generally positive reviews from critics. At Metacritic, which assigns a normalised rating out of 100 to reviews from mainstream critics, the album received an average score of 76, based on 36 reviews, which indicates "generally favourable reviews".

Rob Fitzpatrick at Q magazine said that the album is up there with his best. "As anyone who's ever interviewed Damon Albarn will tell you, he's an endlessly interesting chap. Try and get too close and personal, though, and he'll leave you in silence. However Everyday Robots is more personal than any of his other work, even more so than his early Blur days. 'Hollow Ponds' is a gloriously lazy lament where horses and passing trade 'reveal a pentangle', where 'dreams are shared on LCDs', and reveals more about Blur's second studio album Modern Life is Rubbish." Fitzpatrick also revealed the extent of the contributions that Brian Eno made to the record, after his appearance on both "Heavy Seas of Love" and "You and Me". He named songs like "You and Me" and "The Selfish Giant" as quietly introverted and exploring new depths of his songwriting, he also cited songs "Lonely Press Play", "Heavy Seas of Love" and "Hollow Ponds" as standouts from the album and gave the album a very high four star review.

Andy Gill of Uncut magazine wrote that the album's use of samples from Lord Buckley and Timothy Leary were some of the finer points of the album and praised producer, Richard Russell for his work on the album. He also mentioned the song "Photographs (You Are Taking Now)", as having "...particularly resonant lines...". Talking of the influences on the record, he spoke about how Albarn's track "The Selfish Giant", takes particular influence from Keith Jarrett. He also spoke about the "bubbiling sing-along 'Mr. Tembo'" as being a highlight of the record as well. "The History of a Cheating Heart" also vindicated the "...brave vulnerability characteristic of what is a predominantly melancholy album". In summary he wrote: "For the most part here, however, Everyday Robots is a less ebullient, more intimate and reflective affair, as befits the tentative revelation of a man's soul."

In Clash magazine's review of the album, Gareth James wrote: "What Everyday Robots is, however, is a subtle, textured patchwork covering Damon Albarn's 45 years to date, with lyrics capturing snapshots of his childhood in Leytonstone through to a song he made up for a baby elephant he met in Tanzania. Albarn opted to put himself in the solo spotlight and leave his friend (Richard Russell) behind the desk. Russell's signature stripped-back sound is all over Everyday Robots, but it serves the songs well. Little touches like the piano motif from the title track reappearing at the end of album-closing Brian Eno collaboration 'Heavy Seas of Love', or the gradual hastening of the beat at the end of 'Lonely Press Play' to cue in 'Mr. Tembo', are a delight. The phrase 'slow-burner' is tossed around rather carelessly, but Everyday Robots is a definite contender. Weeks on from the first listen, it feels like it's always been there. It doesn't burn out so much as creep up and these songs offer yet another new guise for a remarkable talent."

Fiona Shepard of The Scotsman gave the album three out of five stars. In her review she mentioned that lyrically it is just as good if not better than, Gorillaz' "On Melancholy Hill" and Rocket Juice & the Moon's "Poison". She also said: "Everyday Robots may be too consistently low-key for the Blur massive, but it is an exquisitely pitched solo flight from a self-confessed serial collaborator."

Andy Gill of The Independent gave the album a 4 out of 5 star review praising the use of Lord Buckley samples on tracks like "Everyday Robots" and "Mr Tembo". He compared Albarn's song-writing to that of rock legend Ray Davies and said: "It's a rare moment of extrovert cheer on an intimate, introspective album that takes tentative steps to reveal the soul behind the star." And recommended that songs like "Everyday Robots", "The History of a Cheating Heart", "Mr Tembo" and "Hollow Ponds" were the standouts of the record as a whole.

Larry Day of musicOMH gave the album four and a half stars out of five. Day wrote: "Everyday Robots is a multi-layered record, much like an aural pavlova, with gooey dollops of bittersweet, outright sweet, darkly morose and wistful reflection. It's rather strange tasting pavlova however, squishing sour pain with halcyon nostalgia." Though Day also pointed out his favourite tracks on the record as well: "'The Selfish Giant', featuring Bat For Lashes' Natasha Khan's dulcet pipes, is home to romantic-era piano motifs and glitchy beats. It's a kind of bare bones dance ballad, with bolshy pulses and simple-yet-sublime melodies. The Brian Eno and The Leytonstone Mission Choir-featuring 'Heavy Seas of Love' is perhaps the grandest cut on the record, with rickety percussion and illustrious piano embellishments."

Jon Dolan of Rolling Stone gave a very positive review, citing Albarn's ability to produce and write melancholic music as one of the album's standout features. Dolan wrote: "Albarn is an avid collaborator who has worked with greats like Bobby Womack and Lou Reed. But his pals stay low-key here. Producer Richard Russell sculpts alluring atmospheric beats; Bat for Lashes singer Natasha Khan lends a faint harmony to the fragile relationship autopsy 'The Selfish Giant'; Brian Eno adds synths to 'You and Me' and vocals to the woozy chanty 'Heavy Seas of Love'. The results can often recall Seventies Eno at his most meditative and Village Green-era Ray Davies at his most world-sick more than Gorillaz's bounce or Blur's guitar buzz."

Chris Schulz of The New Zealand Herald, was a little more critical of the album, writing: "'The hours pass by, just left on repeat,' he mourns on the shuffling broodiness of 'Hostiles'. 'I had a dream you were leaving ... when every atom in the universe is passing through our lives,' he mumbles grumpily on 'The Selfish Giant'. And he saves his biggest mopes for The History of a Cheating Heart, when he complains: 'I carry this on my back.' No wonder Albarn looks so hangdog on the album's cover. But Everyday Robots also comes with moments that are strangely addictive: 'Photographs (You Are Taking Now)' slow-motion throb sounds like something The xx would happily dance to, the title track combines a horror movie atmosphere with genuinely heartfelt lyrics, 'Lonely Press Play' sounds like a Gorillaz outtake that's just missing a De La Soul verse to elevate it to greatness, while the chirpy instrumentals 'Parakeet' and 'Seven High' deserve more exploration." He gave the album three out of five stars and concluded by saying: "He's either a sad man trying to release a happy album, or a happy man trying to release a sad one. Either way, it seems Albarn's tried on so many hats, he might have forgotten which one's his own."

Andrzej Lukowski of Drowned in Sound wrote: "Everyday Robots is a lovely record, and in its lack of duds or whimsical twattery it's probably one of most consistent things Albarn has ever put his name to. That doesn't make it the best, though: it doesn't take risks – not by Albarn's standards, anyway – and in the most literal sense it's not all that exciting. But if its prettiness is conventional, if it gives us what we expect, then you know, you'll listen to this a damn sight more than the Rocket Juice & the Moon album. Damon Albarn is at his best exploring pastures new, but that doesn't make this wordy wise stocktake of a record any less of a pleasure." He also praised the album's track "You and Me" saying: "Much has been made of how personal the record is, but there's nothing searing as Blur's rawest moments – the abiding sensation is one of intense intimacy. Shuffling seven-minute centrepiece "You and Me" contains a sleepy allusion to his past heroin use ("Tin foil and a lighter, the ship across"), but really it's just an honest allusion from a man done with being coy – it's not a song 'about' heroin like "Beetlebum" was, and for all the media fuss the line has generated, nobody actually listening to the song is likely to be shocked."

Alex Petridis of The Guardian wrote: "Beautiful, but subtle, cloudy and elusive, Everyday Robots certainly isn't the album it's purported to be. You come out of the other side not much the wiser about the man behind it. Never mind: the music is good enough that a lack of revelation doesn't really seem to matter while Everyday Robots is playing. Whoever Damon Albarn is, he's extremely good at what he does."

== Track listing ==
All tracks are written by Damon Albarn and produced by Damon Albarn and Richard Russell.

No.	Title	Length
1.	"Everyday Robots"	3:56
2.	"Hostiles"	4:10
3.	"Lonely Press Play"	3:42
4.	"Mr Tembo" (featuring The Leytonstone City Mission Choir)	3:43
5.	"Parakeet"	0:43
6.	"The Selfish Giant" (featuring Natasha Khan)	4:46
7.	"You and Me" (featuring Brian Eno)	7:05
8.	"Hollow Ponds"	5:00
9.	"Seven High"	1:00
10.	"Photographs (You Are Taking Now)"	4:43
11.	"The History of a Cheating Heart"	4:00
12.	"Heavy Seas of Love" (featuring Brian Eno & The Leytonstone City Mission Choir)	3:44

iTunes special edition bonus tracks
No.	Title	Length
13.	"Father's Daughter's Son"	3:39
14.	"Empty Club"	3:16

Everyday Robots DVD
No.	Title	Length
1.	"Track by Track Video" (Bundle Only)	15:42
2.	"Everyday Robots" (Live from Fox studios Los Angeles)	3:57
3.	"Hostiles" (Live from Fox studios Los Angeles)	4:34
4.	"Lonely Press Play" (Live from Fox studios Los Angeles)	4:04
5.	"Hollow Ponds" (Live from Fox studios Los Angeles)	4:40

Sample credits:

- "Everyday Robots" and "Heavy Seas of Love" contain a sample of "Cabenza de Gasca/The Gasser", from the 1960 album, Buckley's Best, as written and performed by Richard Buckley.
- "Mr Tembo" contains a sample of "Lions", from the 1959 album Way Out Humour as written and performed by Richard Buckley.
- "The Selfish Giant" contains a sample of "The Selfish Giant" composed by Kenny Clayton, written by Oscar Wilde and performed by Robert Morley.
- "You and Me" contains a field recording of Notting Hill Carnival and the Central line train leaving Leytonstone station on the London Underground.
- "Hollow Ponds" contains a sample of the Central line train leaving Leytonstone station on the London Underground and of the playground of Albarn's old school.
- "Photographs (You Are Taking Now)" contains a sample from the 1964 audiobook The Psychedelic Experience: A Manual Based on the Tibetan Book of the Dead as written and performed by Timothy Leary.

== Personnel ==
Credits adapted from Everyday Robots inside cover and from Allmusic

- Damon Albarn – vocals, piano, guitar, omnichord, ukulele, backing vocals, drum machine, bass, choir, Korg M1, synthesizer, executive production, additional production, mixing, engineering
- Richard Buckley – voice sample (tracks 1, 4 and 12), backing vocals
- Veona Byfield-Bowen – choir, chorus
- Dan Carpenter – trumpet
- Jamie Carter – director and editor
- Kris Chen – spoken word
- Demon Strings – strings
- Isabelle Dunn – strings
- Margurita Edwards – choir, chorus
- Ian Eason – audio
- Kaktus Einarsson – assistant engineer
- Brian Eno – guest vocals (tracks 7 and 12), backing vocals, synthesizers
- John Foyle – assistant engineer
- Conroy Griffiths – choir, chorus
- Nicholas Hougham – french horn
- Natasha Khan – guest vocals (track 6), backing vocals
- Ollie Langford – violin
- Yonni Lappin – camera operator
- Timothy Leary – voice sample (track 10), backing vocals
- The Leytonstone City Mission Choir – choir, guest vocals, backing vocals
- Charles Moriarty – photography technician
- Robert Morley – voice sample (track 6)
- Kevin Metcalfe – mixing, mastering
- Celia Murphy – choir, chorus
- Jerome O'Connell – steel pans
- Mary Oldacre – choir, chorus
- Passion Pictures – CGI Production
- Antonia Pagulatos – strings
- Pauli the PSM – live drums
- Alice Pratley – strings
- Richard Russell – executive production, drum programming, MIDI, drum machine, MPC, AKAI MPC 500, production, spoken word, mixing, sampling, Roland TR-909, engineering
- Kotono Sato – strings
- Stephen Sedgwick – recording, engineering, mixing
- Seye – live bass, live guitar
- Mike Smith – live keyboards, string arrangements
- Aitor Throup – packaging, creative director
- Simon Tong – additional guitar
- Patsy Walsh – choir, chorus
- Jeff Wootton – live guitar, live bass

== Charts and certifications ==
=== Weekly charts ===
Chart (2014)	Peak position
Australian Albums (ARIA)	26
Austrian Albums (Ö3 Austria)	12
Belgian Albums (Ultratop Flanders)	8
Belgian Albums (Ultratop Wallonia)	9
Canadian Albums (Billboard)	20
Danish Albums (Hitlisten)	4
Dutch Albums (Album Top 100)	19
French Albums (SNEP)	6
German Albums (Offizielle Top 100)	7
Greek Albums (IFPI)	65
Hungarian Albums (MAHASZ)	6
Irish Albums (IRMA)	3
Italian Albums (FIMI)	10
Japanese Albums (Oricon)	21
New Zealand Albums (RMNZ)	15
Polish Albums (ZPAV)	40
Portuguese Albums (AFP)	29
Scottish Albums (Official Charts)	2
Spanish Albums (Promusicae)	42
Swedish Albums (Sverigetopplistan)	44
Swiss Albums (Schweizer Hitparade)	6
UK Albums (Official Charts)	2
UK Album Downloads (Official Charts)	4
US Billboard 200	32
US Top Alternative Albums (Billboard)	5
US Top Rock Albums (Billboard)	12
US Indie Store Album Sales (Billboard)	5

=== Year-end charts ===
Chart (2014)	Position
Belgian Albums (Ultratop Flanders)	94
Belgian Albums (Ultratop Wallonia)	109
French Albums (SNEP)	172

=== Certifications ===
Region	Certification	Certified units/sales
United Kingdom (BPI)	Silver	60,000^{*}
^{*} Sales figures based on certification alone.

== Release history ==
Region	Date	Label	Format	Ref.
Australia	25 April 2014	Parlophone	CD, digital download	
Poland	28 April 2014	Warner Music	CD, LP, CD+DVD, digital download	
United Kingdom	28 April 2014	Parlophone	CD, digital download	
