= Heavy Seas of Love =

2014 single by Damon Albarn

Single by Damon Albarn

from the album Everyday Robots
- Released: 27 April 2014
- Recorded: 2013
- Studio: Studio 13 (West London)
- Genre: Indie pop
- Length: 3:44
- Label: Parlophone; Warner Bros.; XL
- Songwriters: Damon Albarn; Brian Eno
- Producers: Damon Albarn; Brian Eno; Richard Russell

Damon Albarn singles chronology
"Mr. Tembo" (2014)	"Heavy Seas of Love" (2014)	"Go Out" (2015)

Brian Eno singles chronology
"One Fine Day" (2009)	"Heavy Seas of Love" (2014)

The Leytonstone City Mission Choir singles chronology
"Mr. Tembo" (2014)	"Heavy Seas of Love" (2014)

"Heavy Seas of Love" is the fifth single by Damon Albarn, from his solo debut album, Everyday Robots. It was released as a single in digital formats on 27 April 2014, via Warner Bros. Records in the US. It features Brian Eno, Natasha Khan, and the Leytonstone City Mission Choir.

== Background ==
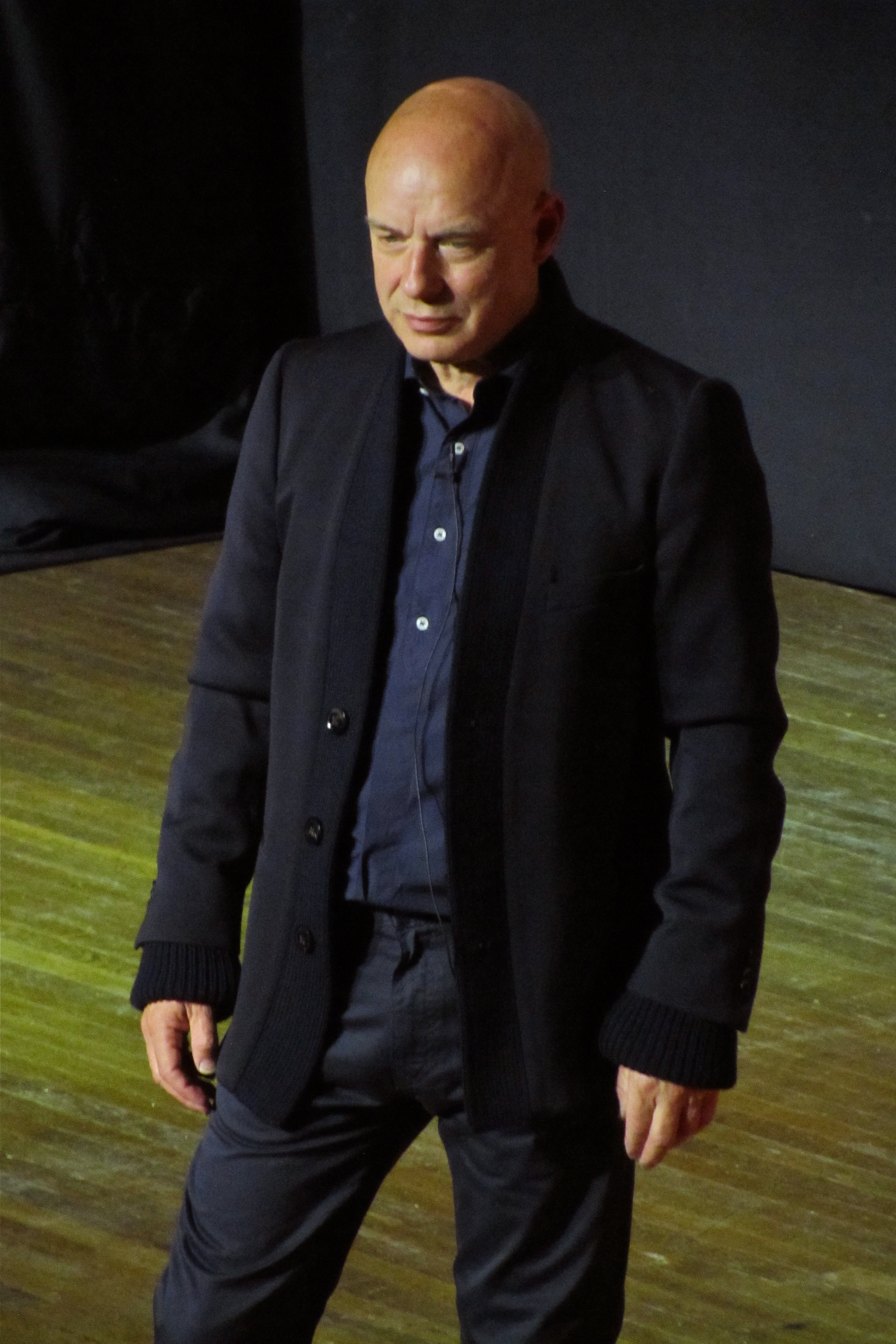
Brian Eno contributes vocals on the song "Heavy Seas of Love".

On 18 January 2014, the Warner Music Store was updated to include Damon Albarn's new album and its name was revealed – Everyday Robots, which is also the name of the first single. The deluxe edition of the album will come packaged with a DVD of Albarn performing a few album tracks live at Fox Studios in Los Angeles, California. The DVD was filmed on 3 December 2013. On the next day, the album's information was removed from the website, which made many believe it was not supposed to have leaked so soon. Albarn said in his Facebook page that this record is his most soul-searching and autobiographical yet, explores nature versus technology and features guests Brian Eno and Natasha Khan, also known as Bat for Lashes.

Speaking of Brian Eno, who appears on the album and has also been involved in Albarn's Africa Express project, Albarn said: "He's a neighbour: I used to go to a health club that he goes to as well, but he always did much more interesting things than I did. I'd be on a mind-numbing running machine, and he took water aerobics classes. He was very Eno about it."

On 24 March 2014, Albarn released the song in its full studio format without the audio watermark on the track, and released the single art cover as well. The cover art is of the Palacio Salvo in Plaza Independencia in Uruguay.

== Recording ==
Albarn gave an interview with Danielle Perry on XFM and he said that Eno was invited to come along and listen to the album and Albarn asked him if he would sing on a track for the record, as Albarn was a huge fan of Eno's earlier music and had wanted a collaboration with Eno for a very long time.

With regards to the lyric: "...Heavy Seas of Love, we come together in you" has been compared to US band The National and their single "Sea of Love", with Albarn painting the concept of "love" as a uniting, omnipresent force — as omnipresent as the seas that cover ¾'s of Earth. It's an optimistic view, but with the ever present threat of war and death, some may see love merely as the distractor to all the world's hate.

== Music video ==
Albarn and Aitor Throup, the creative director for the album, began a competition to direct Albarn's new video, in association with Tribeca Interactive. The Music Film Challenge, in collaboration with The Lincoln Motor Company, gives today's storytellers an unprecedented opportunity: to re-imagine storytelling for the digital age by creating interactive music films. To participate, filmmakers will use Treehouse – Interlude's self-service authoring suite – to create an interactive music film for the song with Treehouse's simple and intuitive interface, participants can design their interactive music films in a multi-branch, multi-layered, tree-structured style, which will allow viewers to play an active role in the storytelling process. The finalists' films will be showcased as part of the Tribeca Online Festival and displayed throughout 2014 Tribeca Film Festival official venues and lounges via interactive kiosks, in addition being made available on the Challenge website. Damon Albarn and Aitor Throup, Creative Director for 'Everyday Robots,' along with an esteemed jury, will select one winning filmmaker who will receive $10,000. They will also receive travel to New York, including accommodation, and tickets to attend and be showcased at the 2014 Tribeca Film Festival (16–27 April). The winner was Jakub Romanowicz from Poland.

However a "true music video" was released on 22 April 2014, featuring a similar approach as Albarn's "Lonely Press Play" music video, which was shot entirely on an iPad. The video is composed of mildly psychedelic travel footage shot by Albarn and edited by Matt Cronin. Neither The Leytonstone City Mission Choir or Brian Eno appear in the music video.

== Critical reception ==
Danny Eccelston of Mojo wrote: "Gospel sunshine streaked with London-grey melancholy, Heavy Seas of Love is one of the more in-your-face tunes off Damon Albarn's otherwise downbeat and reflective new album, Everyday Robots. Featuring the lovelorn sealion vocals of Albarn's fellow West London artisan pal Brian Eno, it's one of those songs with the strength to spirit you away and apply a balm to the cares of now. Hey, Damon's been there, too. Maybe even Brian. Well, maybe not Brian".

Matthew Horton of the NME wrote: "And it all ends with a big, skewed pop song as Brian Eno joins Albarn for fruity, comforting harmonies – 'When your soul isn't right/And it's raw to the night ... You're in safe hands' – that stick in your head like the verses to Michael Jackson's 'Heal the World'. There's a crunchy chorus too, that'll have them singing along at Glastonbury's Park Stage on a twilit Saturday evening. Probably."

== Promotion ==
Albarn apremièred, "Everyday Robots" and "Lonely Press Play" at YouTube's pop-up venue at the Sundance Film Festival on 19 January. The invitation-only performance included acoustic versions of five new songs including El Mañana by Gorillaz and an as yet unknown Blur track. Albarn also played the song on Dermot O'Leary's BBC Radio 2 show, in a more "stripped-back acoustic" performance and also performed a cover of Terry Jacks' "Seasons in the Sun" And also previewed the song "Heavy Seas of Love" featuring Brian Eno and The Leytonstone City Mission Choir as well.

It was also revealed by on Damon's official Twitter account, that his Live Band will be called The Heavy Seas, and will feature guitarist Seye, drummer Pauli the PSM, guitarist Jeff Wootton and Mike Smith on keyboards.

So far, the songs "Everyday Robots", which was the album's first single, "Photographs (You are Taking Now)" and "Lonely Press Play" have been heard in their full studio form, however, Albarn has performed the song "Heavy Seas of Love" live at several events, and the songs "Hollow Ponds", "Hostiles" and "Mr. Tembo", were previewed on Albarn's appearance on the BBC's Culture Show.

== Track listing ==
No.	Title	Length
1.	"Heavy Seas of Love" (featuring Brian Eno & The Leytonstone City Mission Choir)	3:44
2.	"Heavy Seas of Love" (Instrumental)	3:44

== Personnel ==
- Damon Albarn - lead vocals, piano, backing vocals, music video footage and director
- Seye Adelekan - guitar
- Jeff Wootton - six string bass guitar
- Richard Buckley - voice sample
- Matt Cronin - music video editor
- Brian Eno - guest vocals, harmonies, backing vocals, percussion
- The Leytonstone City Mission Choir - choir, harmonies, guest vocals, backing vocals
- Richard Russell - production, drum programming, drums
- Stephen Sedgwick – recording, engineering, mixing

== Charts ==
Chart (2014)	Peak position
Belgium (Ultratip Bubbling Under Flanders)	40
France (SNEP)	138
UK Singles (Official Charts)	70
