= The Selfish Giant (song) =

2013 song by Damon Albarn, featuring Natasha Khan

Song by Damon Albarn featuring Natasha Khan

from the album Everyday Robots
- Recorded: 2013; Studio 13 (West London)
- Genre: Folktronica; soul; trip hop; downtempo
- Length: 4:47
- Label: Parlophone, Warner. Bros., XL
- Songwriters: Damon Albarn & Natasha Khan
- Producers: Damon Albarn & Richard Russell

"The Selfish Giant" is a song recorded by English recording artist and songwriter and Blur frontman & Gorillaz creator, Damon Albarn, from his debut solo studio album Everyday Robots. The track features Natasha Khan, known professionally as Bat for Lashes. The track is produced by both Albarn and Richard Russell, whom Albarn has previously worked with on Bobby Womack's comeback album The Bravest Man in the Universe and on the DRC Music album Kinshasa One Two.

== Background ==
On 18 January 2014, the Warner Music Store was updated to include Damon Albarn's new album and its name was revealed – Everyday Robots. The deluxe edition of the album came packaged with a DVD of Albarn performing a few album tracks live at Fox Studios in Los Angeles. The DVD was filmed on 3 December 2013. On the next day, the album's information was removed from the website, which made many believe it was not supposed to have leaked so soon.

In a January 2014 interview with Rolling Stone, Albarn revealed that Natasha Khan will appear on the track "The Selfish Giant" as a "ghostly echo", and that Brian Eno had collaborated on the album's final track.

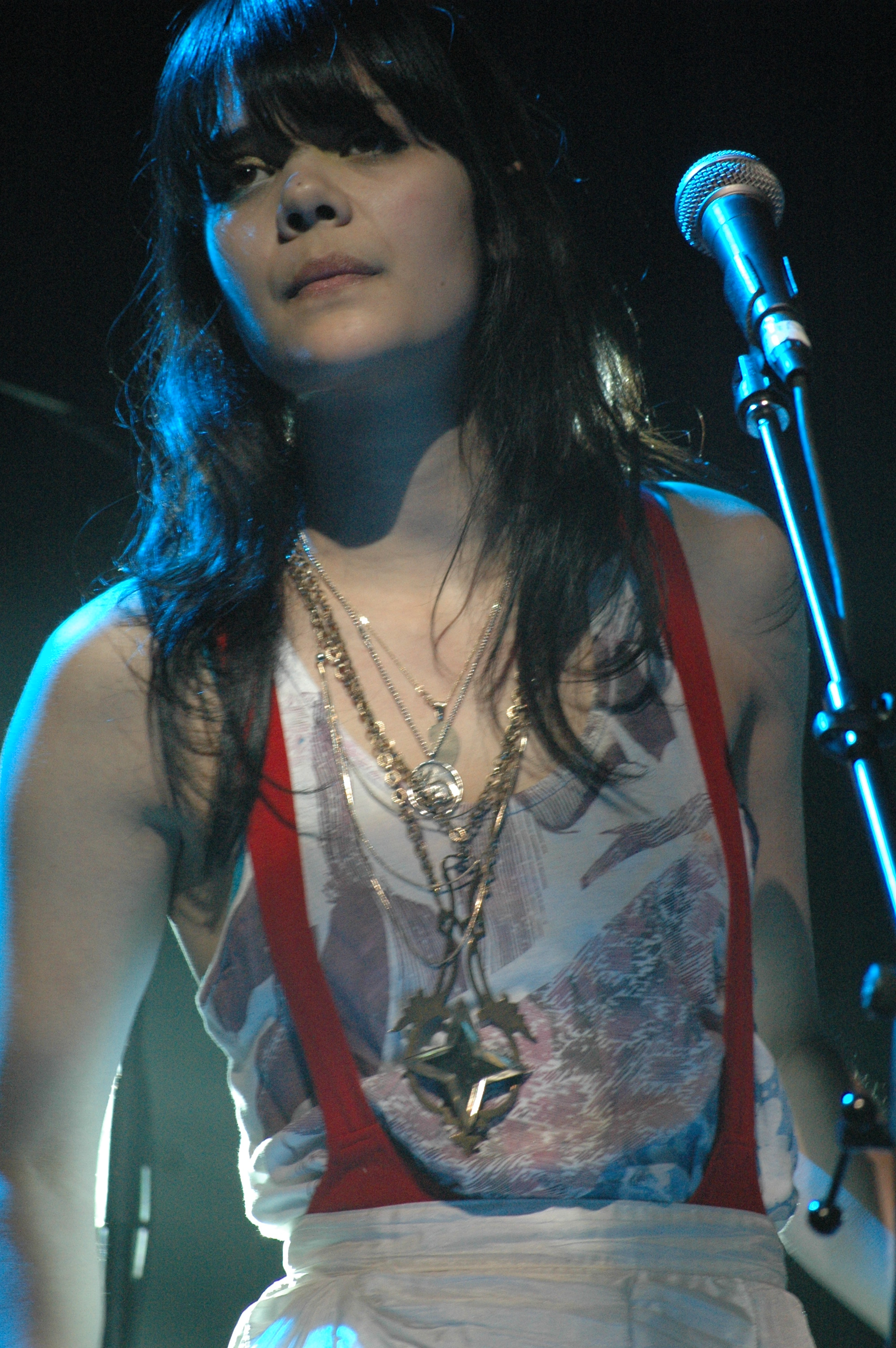
Natasha Khan (Bat for Lashes), appears as a "ghostly echo" on "The Selfish Giant"

Albarn said in an interview: "I wrote the songs, but Richard Russell was a fantastic editor and did a lot of the atmospheric stuff, so in a sense it's not entirely my record. It is my narrative, and my voice and my songs. I started off giving Richard a lot of songs, 60 or 60-plus – he had the editorship."

Speaking of her contribution to Everyday Robots, Bat for Lashes' Natasha Khan said: "If I could go back and tell the 15-year-old me that I'd just sang with Damon for his new record, she'd probably wet her pants with excitement, I had such a massive crush on him [...]". In 2013, Khan had supported Albarn's band Blur at the Irish Museum of Modern Art in Dublin, Ireland.

In 2014, Albarn revealed that the inspiration for the song came from Blur's visit to the Scottish town of Dunoon in 1995 and a view he had of the Holy Loch. "It was a beautiful misty evening," he remembers. "There was a single submarine in the loch – why it was there I don't know. I had a very strong image of the loch and submarines and walking down the main drag in Dunoon after the gig, going to someone's house for a party, and a song came out of it."

It is the second-longest song on the entire album, behind "You and Me".

The song contains a sample of "The Selfish Giant", composed by Kenny Clayton, written by Oscar Wilde and performed by Robert Morley.

== Promotion ==
Albarn also confirmed that he will play a series of "intimate gigs" in support of the album at the Rivoli Ballroom in Crofton Park on 30 April, followed by a show at the People's Palace in Mile End on 1 May, in which he will also play songs from his bands Blur, Gorillaz & The Good, the Bad & the Queen. Both dates would come shortly after the release of the album itself.

Albarn was the subject of a half-hour episode of The Culture Show broadcast on BBC Two in February 2014, which focused on his previous bands and his current work. In the programme he returned to his former homes in Leytonstone, East London, and Colchester, Essex. Speaking in the programme, he revealed that he found his first solo LP tough, saying: "I've spent so long in bands, playing to large groups of people, that doing a solo album is quite a difficult thing for me to do. That's why I put it off for so long." Speaking about being raised in London, he said: "Growing up in multi-cultural London in the 1970s played a big part of who I am." The documentary included clips of songs from his album as well, including 'Hollow Ponds', 'Hostiles' and 'Mr. Tembo'. It also featured a clip of Albarn's father, artist Keith Albarn, showcasing an interactive installation on a 1960s episode of Tomorrow's World.

It was also revealed by on Damon's official Twitter account, that his live band will be called The Heavy Seas, and will feature guitarist Seye, drummer Pauli the PSM, guitarist Jeff Wootton and Mike Smith on keyboards.

Although the record will be released under his name, he said he wanted himself and his backing band to be known as The Heavy Seas. The band's first performance was at the BBC Radio 6 Music Festival. "This is our first ever gig and it's quite nerve-wracking to be not only playing your first gig but playing it live on radio as well," he told the crowd at the venue and the audience of 6 Music listeners. "But I suppose I should be used to it after all these years." The gig also saw the first exclusive plays of songs such as "The Selfish Giant" and "Mr. Tembo", Albarn also played Tomorrow Comes Today from Gorillaz eponymous debut album and The Good, the Bad & the Queen single "Kingdom of Doom" as well as "El Mañana" from Demon Days and the Blur B-Side "All Your Life". "The Selfish Giant", itself was particularly well received, and many people praised Khan's vocals that ebbed through in the live performance.

== Critical reception ==
In his track-by-track review, Matthew Horton of NME said: ""Celebrate the passing drugs/Put 'em on the backseat while they're coursing through your blood" – yes, 'The Selfish Giant' is about a nuclear submarine. Well, that's hard to get a grip on ("Waiting for the final call that's coming down the line," maybe?), but what 'The Selfish Giant' really sounds like is a refined goodbye over dub bass and piping organ, drifting into a chorus that's devastating in its ordinary heartbreak: "I had a dream you were leaving/It's hard to be a lover when the TV's on/And nothing's in your eyes". The sort of thing you hope isn't autobiographical."

Dan Cains of The Sunday Times wrote: Featuring the treated voice of Bat for Lashes’ Natasha Khan on its chorus and opening with Albarn essaying a serpentine jazz motif on the piano, this track contains the album's deadliest lyric (“It’s hard to be a lover when the TV’s on and nothing’s in your eyes”), which Albarn fought to have edited out, being later over-ruled by Russell. “I’d be like ‘I can’t be singing this, Richard. I can’t deal with the responsibility of that line.” And he went, ‘No, no, no, that’s one of the best things you’ve written.’ My missus (the artist Suzi Winstanley) was always like, 'I don't like that line." I'm not surprised. I don't like it either. It's just not cool." Beneath the lyric, sonorous piano chords plod; above it, an eerie, bird-like clarinet screeches before dropping like a stone.

== Personnel ==
- Damon Albarn – main vocals, piano
- Jeff Wootton: six string bass guitar
- Mike Smith: keyboards
- Natasha Khan – backing vocals, featured guest
- Robert Morley – voice sample
- Richard Russell – production, sampling, drum programming, drums
- Stephen Sedgwick – recording, engineering, mixing
