= Mr Tembo =

Single by Damon Albarn featuring The Leytonstone City Mission Choir

from the album Everyday Robots
- Released: 16 April 2014
- Recorded: 2013; Studio 13 (West London)
- Genre: Pop rock; gospel
- Length: 3:43
- Label: Parlophone, Warner. Bros., XL
- Songwriter(s): Damon Albarn; Richard Buckley
- Producer(s): Damon Albarn; Richard Russell

Damon Albarn singles chronology
"Hollow Ponds" (2014)	"Mr Tembo" (2014)	"Heavy Seas of Love" (2014)

The Leytonstone City Mission Choir singles chronology
"Mr Tembo" (2014)	"Heavy Seas of Love" (2014)

"Mr Tembo" is the fourth single released by English recording artist, songwriter and Blur/Gorillaz frontman, Damon Albarn, from his debut solo studio album Everyday Robots. Its release as a single was limited to the United States. The track features The Leytonstone City Mission Choir and contains a sample of "Lions", from the 1959 album Way Out Humor as written and performed by Richard Buckley. The track is produced by both Albarn and Richard Russell, whom Albarn had previously worked with on Bobby Womack's comeback album The Bravest Man in the Universe and on the DRC Music album, Kinshasa One Two.

== Background ==
"Mr Tembo" was recorded for a baby elephant that Albarn met in a national park in Mkomazi, Tanzania. He said in an interview for Rolling Stone: "It was recently orphaned and walked onto this aerodrome; the people I know took it in and called it Mr. Tembo. I was there, and I met this little elephant, and he was very sweet. I sang it to him." "Tembo" in Swahili means "elephant".

On 17 February 2014, Albarn was the subject of an episode of The Culture Show, in which he talked about the album, and his own personal experiences from his earlier life and how they had a profound effect on his songwriting. Albarn spoke about "Mr Tembo", and said that the eponymous elephant had grown up around gospel music, as his owners were fans, so Albarn decided to incorporate The Leytonstone City Mission Choir, to offer a more gospel element to the track, saying in the programme: "If the elephant does hear the finished track, hopefully he'll like it..."

As for the recording process of the album, Albarn started it with nearly 60 songs written down, and then would allow co-producer Richard Russell to pick his favourites, which would then become tracks on his album. With regards to "Mr Tembo", Albarn said "It was recorded on a phone, and in a light-hearted moment, I put it on a list for Richard. He said, 'I'd really like you to try that,' so I did. I started off giving Richard a lot of songs, 60 or 60-plus – he had the editorship. Hence a song like 'Mr Tembo', which I never would have considered recording, because I put that in my 'songs I write for other things', like for kids' birthdays, or in this case, it was for a baby elephant I met in a place called Mkomazi, in Tanzania."

An article on the baby elephant that Albarn wrote "Mr Tembo" about was released. The baby elephant became separated from his mother and Albarn wrote the song as a tribute to the elephant. The track was played in a demo form, for the elephant by Albarn and Paul Simonon when they visited Tanzania. Despite his new carer's efforts, the elephant's mother was nowhere to be found, and Albarn dedicated the song to him. It was played live on Jimmy Kimmel Live!, and was very well received by critics, applauding the song for its upbeat nature. The sample used on the song is that of "Lions" by American comedian Lord Buckley, from the 1959 album Way Out Humor and features the lyrics: "Fred, will you take those lions off the front of the boat? Good God man, lets have some heart in you! Will you please...!? All right. I'm trying to run this expedition in a decent manner..."

When asked how the elephant responded to the track Albarn said: "To be honest to you, when I sang it to the elephant, it shat itself. Because it was on milk, it was white elephant baby poo, if you can imagine that. It’s quite something at close vicinity."

Speaking of the collaborations with The Leytonstone City Mission Choir, Albarn felt that the choir held a nostalgic importance to him and asked the Church if he could record with the choir, "Back in Leytonstone, there was a Pentecostal Church at the end of my road that belonged to the city mission. I remember standing outside with my bicycle listening to the singing, but never being able to find an entry point. But it was a very strong childhood memory that I've carried with me. I got in contact with that church, and they've still got a small choir, so they very kindly agreed to sing on the record a bit."

On Tuesday 25 March 2014, the track was heard in its full studio form, which features the prominent Lord Buckley sample and a spoken-word portion from Albarn as well.

According to Dan Cains of The Sunday Times, "Mr Tembo" was written for Albarn's daughter Missy: "The album's one anomaly, was intended as a birthday gift to his daughter, Missy, for whom Albarn has long written songs. 'I knew it was time to stop,' he deadpans, 'when my daughter cried when I played her one on one of her recent birthdays – out of embarrassment, not pleasure.' All that, plus a gospel choir and an Albarn rap."

== Live performances ==
The track has been performed live many times by Albarn; however the song was heard in its full form on Jimmy Kimmel Live! on 12 March 2014, when Albarn and his live band "Damon Albarn and the Heavy Seas" performed the track with a local American choir. Albarn's band consists of Seye, drummer Pauli the PSM, guitarist Jeff Wootton and Mike Smith on keyboards.

The band's first performance was at BBC Radio 6 Music Festival on 28 February 2014. Albarn told the audience, "This is our first ever gig and it's quite nerve-wracking to be not only playing your first gig but playing it live on radio as well, but I suppose I should be used to it after all these years." The gig also saw the first exclusive plays of songs such as "The Selfish Giant" and "Mr Tembo", Albarn also played "Tomorrow Comes Today" from Gorillaz eponymous debut album and The Good, the Bad & the Queen single "Kingdom of Doom" as well as "El Mañana" from Demon Days and the Blur B-side "All Your Life".

== Music video ==
On 22 April 2014, guitarist Seye updated on Tumblr that Albarn and his live band The Heavy Seas were filming a music video for the song. The music video was released on 13 May 2014. The video features Albarn and his band The Heavy Seas plus footage of the real Mr. Tembo – an orphaned baby elephant Albarn met while travelling in Tanzania. The studio-shot portions of the video were filmed in the Pentecostal City Mission Church in Leytonstone and features the church choir, who also sing on the album.

== Critical reception ==
Matthew Horton of NME wrote in his track-by-track review: "It takes a song about a baby elephant to inject a spring into the album's step, despite Mr. Tembo needing a 'helping hand' to get up the hill. At times, Mr. Tembo's African guitar bounce is so jaunty it feels as if it could launch into 'Upside Down', surf-bum folkie Jack Johnson's deathless theme to the venerated movie adaptation of Curious George. Lazy horns and a joyous choir take it somewhere a little more meaty."

== Track listing ==
No.	Title	Length
1.	"Mr Tembo" (featuring The Leytonstone City Mission Choir)	3:43
2.	"Mr Tembo" (instrumental)	3:43

== Personnel ==
- Damon Albarn – main vocals, ukulele, additional guitar, backing vocals
- Jeff Wootton – six string bass guitar
- Lord Buckley – voice sample
- Veona Byfield-Bowen – choir
- Margurita Edwards – choir
- Conroy Griffths – choir
- Richard Russell – production, sampling, drum programming, drums, effects
- Stephen Sedgwick – recording, engineering, mixing
- Ollie Langford – violin
- The Leytonstone City Mission Choir – choir, backing vocals, featured guest
- Celia Murphy – choir
- Mary Oldacre – choir
- Mike Smith – piano, string arrangements
- Paul Simonon: bass guitar arrangements
- Patsy Walsh – choir
- Dan Carpenter – trumpet
