= Everyday Robots (song) =

Single by Damon Albarn

from the album Everyday Robots
- B-side: "Electric Fences"
- Released: 3 March 2014
- Recorded: 2011–2013
- Studio: Studio 13, London, UK
- Genre: Downtempo
- Length: 3:57
- Label: Parlophone; Warner. Bros.; XL
- Songwriter: Damon Albarn
- Producers: Richard Russell; Damon Albarn

Damon Albarn singles chronology
"Hallo" (2011)	"Everyday Robots" (2014)	"Lonely Press Play" (2014)

"Everyday Robots" is a song by Damon Albarn, from his debut solo album, Everyday Robots. It was released as his debut solo single in digital and limited edition 7" vinyl formats on 3 March 2014, via Warner Bros. Records in the US. Moreover, the album's title track was released with a non-album B-side called "Electric Fences". The song also contains samples of 1940-1950s comic performer Lord Buckley's hipsemantic rant about Spanish explorer Álvar Núñez Cabeza de Vaca.

A music video for the song was released on 20 January 2014.

== Background ==
Albarn conceived the song while stuck in a traffic jam in California. He explained to XFM's John Kennedy. "I was just watching everyone around me and everyone is so lost in their little worlds: on the telephone, listening to music." One of the verses begins with the lyric, "Everyday Robots just touch thumbs," which Albarn admitted to Kennedy is his vision of years to come. "I always like to sing to the future and imagine it, I've always done that," he said. "I remember when I wrote 'The Universal' it was just when the idea of satellites were really fresh, and the lottery and everything, and now it's just such a part of everyone's reality. It's not a direct vision of the future it's just you feel that's what's going to happen," he added. "I like the idea of, in the future, we've only got thumbs. I don't like it, actually, it terrifies me."

== Critical reception ==
Marc Hogan of Spin wrote: "With not only strings and keyboard but also burbling electronics and non-Western flutters, the song is a stirring addition to a catalog of subdued stunners like Gorillaz' "On Melancholy Hill" or Bobby Womack's "Please Forgive My Heart" (which Albarn co-produced)." Michael Cragg of The Guardian also stated: "Opening with what sounds like strangely filtered strings, piano and creaking, muffled beats, the opening line – 'we are everyday robots on our phones' – makes it clear this particular track focuses on the nature/technology dichotomy as opposed to anything deeply personal." He also compared the work to Radiohead frontman Thom Yorke's solo works, most particularly to the songs in The Eraser, while also describing it as "paranoid and pretty."

In his track-by-track review, Matthew Horton of NME wrote: "The title track wheezes along, squeaking like a rocking chair – these robots need winding up. It's a sweet, mournful melody, stark in its appraisal of all of us as 'everyday robots on our phones/In the process of getting home'. We're 'out there on our own... in control/Or in the process of being so... getting old', and at this stage Albarn's not offering many shafts of light. It's as subdued an album opener as you're likely to hear and there are no euphoric techno bug-outs around the corner."

== Music video ==
The music video, which is directed by artist Aitor Throup, was released on 20 January 2014. It features a digital deconstruction and reconstruction of Albarn's head. Computer-generated imagery software, actual cranial scans and facial reconstruction techniques were used to produce the animated video. The video for the track also premiered on Sundance Channel.

The focus was to represent Damon Albarn as an individual: as a person and an artist, in the most direct way possible, showing the very tangible layers to his work, which merges authenticity and complexity with instant simplicity and a unique balance between nature and technology. The video is a metaphor of Albarn's work being the result of many elements informing the final product. Like an anatomical study, the result of the eventual piece is a direct result of everything that informs it, everything it represents. Throup commented, "I spent a lot of time with Damon in the studio, and I really wanted to capture his intentions and messages while proposing a unique way to convey them visually. There are specific lyrics that strike me, and particularly his analysis of how we are at times like robots, everyday on our phones 'looking like standing stones'. I was really interested in the idea of how the challenge of living with technology has turned us into repeats of the same. It's a sort of individual statement on the loss of individuality through technology, done in a way that at the same time not only embraces it, but is dependent on it.'

== Official remix ==
On 12 February 2014, on Albarn's official SoundCloud, a remix for the single was released called "Everyday Robots (Richard's Robotic Reduction)", although the track features the similar instrumental, there are almost no vocals from Albarn itself, and the remix uses the Lord Buckley sample many times. The track also features the exact dictionary definition of a remix and uses iPad apps for the voicework and uses a new drum machine for the instrumental as well. The song itself is closer to Gorillaz work than other Albarn projects.

== Track listing ==
Ltd 7" + HD Download Bundle

No.	Title	Length
1.	"Everyday Robots"	3:57
2.	"Electric Fences"	4:08

CD Promo

No.	Title	Length
1.	"Everyday Robots"	3:57
2.	"Everyday Robots (Instrumental)"	3:57

== Personnel ==
- Damon Albarn — main vocals, sampling, piano, backing vocals
- Mike Smith — keyboards, string arrangements
- Jeff Wootton — six string bass guitar
- Demon Strings — strings
- Isabelle Dunn — strings
- Giorgio Gremigni — music video Film editor
- Oli Langford — strings
- Kevin Metcalfe — mixing and mastering
- William Nichols — music video commissioner
- Stella Page — strings
- Antonia Pagulatos — strings
- Alice Pratley — strings
- Richard Russell — production, drum programming, drum machine
- Kotono Sato — strings
- Stephen Sedgwick — recording, engineering, mixing
- Aitor Throup — music video director, single packaging, creative director
