= Lonely Press Play =

Single by Damon Albarn

from the album Everyday Robots
- B-side: "Hollow Ponds" (7")
- Released: 27 February 2014
- Recorded: 2013
- Genre: Trip hop; art pop; indie pop
- Length: 3:43
- Label: Parlophone, Warner Bros., XL
- Songwriter: Damon Albarn
- Producers: Damon Albarn & Richard Russell

Damon Albarn singles chronology
"Everyday Robots" (2014)	"Lonely Press Play" (2014)	"Hollow Ponds" (2014)

"Lonely Press Play" is the second single by Damon Albarn, from his solo debut album Everyday Robots. It was released as a single in digital format on 27 February 2014. The song was made available to all who had pre-ordered Albarn's album from iTunes. The song was produced by Albarn & Richard Russell, the music video for the song was uploaded onto Albarn's official YouTube channel on the day of release.

== Music video ==
Albarn captured footage for the video guerilla-style in a variety of locations including Tokyo, London, Dallas, Utah, Iceland, Colchester, Devon, and North Korea. The video was shot using Albarn's iPad. Albarn told Rolling Stone that his interest in filming his surroundings was tied to a reflective mood he found himself in while working on Everyday Robots. "I started at the beginning by going back to the neighborhood where I grew up and walking around and filming stuff with my iPad," he said. "It was like my own archaeological dig, cordoning off areas that I wanted to concentrate on."

== Release ==
Albarn had performed two stripped-down acoustic versions of "Lonely Press Play" on BBC Radio 2, and at the Sundance Festival with a small string section. The video and track were both released on the same day and were made available on Albarn's official website and on iTunes.

== Critical reception ==
Marc Hogan of Spin gave a positive review of the song as well saying: "Damon Albarn is alone yet not alone in enough senses for a movie that might actually deserve an Oscar. The Blur frontman has unveiled the studio version of his upcoming solo album's "Lonely Press Play," which he previously performed at Sundance, and both the song and its accompanying video – filled with simple yet majestic shots of air travel and time-passing gadgets – stand out for the simultaneously humane and awe-filled way they address our engagement with technology. Even pre-Internet tech like, y'know, the jumbo jet." Dots & Dashes' review was very positive as well saying: "Inimitably brilliant cross-cultural polymath Damon Albarn has been inverting the conventional for so long that it should come as no surprise for him to have unravelled an acoustic revision of Everyday Robots cog Lonely Press Play long before most of us have been afforded the opportunity to hear the original edit. Session takes are, it goes without saying, something more of an afterthought, after all. Yet so much time, effort, thought and energy goes into Albarn's every work that, once more, it should be no wonder that the song's album edit is commensurately splendid, sprinklings of intimate piano tinkering and mumbled bass lines accentuating another typically exemplary recording. Don't know about you, but we've a couple thumbs itching to press play on Everyday Robots right now…"

In his track-by-track review for NME, Matthew Horton said: "And don't get the glow sticks out quite yet, even though there's a brighter dubby flow, prettified by tinkling bells and mysterious synth meanders that owe something to The Specials' "Ghost Town". Jazzy piano affects a devil-may-care atmosphere, but the lyric feels honest and open: "You're not resolved in your heart/You're waiting for me... to improve". It's a gorgeous song and unbearably tender when Albarn whispers the final "...to improve" at the close."

In his track-by-track review for The Sunday Times, Dan Cains wrote: "Like a funeral take on Gorillaz’ "Superfast Jellyfish" sprinkled with cabaret-lounge piano and disco strings, this combines a soul vocal, jarring, muffled beats and a chorus that begins with the work “arrhythmia.” It's at once utterly forlorn, cautiously optimistic and sonically warm, an Albarn trademark."

== Live performances ==
Albarn premièred, "Lonely Press Play" at YouTube's pop-up venue at the Sundance Film Festival on 19 January. The invitation-only performance included acoustic versions of five new songs including "El Mañana" by Gorillaz and "All Your Life" by Blur. Albarn also played the song on Dermot O'Leary's BBC Radio 2 show, in a more "stripped-back acoustic" performance and also performed a cover of Terry Jacks' "Seasons in the Sun" And also previewed the song "Heavy Seas of Love" featuring Brian Eno and The Leytonstone City Mission Choir as well.

== Track listing ==
No.	Title	Length
1.	"Lonely Press Play"	3:42
2.	"Hollow Ponds"	4:59

== Personnel ==
- Damon Albarn - main vocals, sampling, guitar, backing vocals
- Jeff Wootton - six string bass guitar
- Mike Smith: piano, organ, string arrangements
- Demon Strings - strings
- Richard Russell - production, drum programming, drums
- Stephen Sedgwick – recording, engineering, mixing
