= The Selfish Giant =

The Selfish Giant can refer to:

- One of the five stories in the collection The Happy Prince and Other Tales (1888) by Oscar Wilde.
- The Selfish Giant (1971 film), Canadian animated film adaptation
- The Selfish Giant (2013 film), British film
- "The Selfish Giant" (song), by Damon Albarn from the album Everyday Robots
- The Selfish Giant, a 1983 ballet with music by Graeme Koehne
