= You and Me (Damon Albarn song) =

Song by Damon Albarn featuring Brian Eno

from the album Everyday Robots
- Recorded: 2013
- Studio: Studio 13, London, UK
- Genre: Folktronica
- Length: 7:05
- Label: Parlophone, Warner. Bros., XL
- Songwriter: Damon Albarn
- Producers: Damon Albarn, Brian Eno & Richard Russell

"You and Me" is a song recorded by English singer-songwriter Damon Albarn for his solo studio album Everyday Robots. Albarn and producer Richard Russell had previously worked on Bobby Womack's comeback album The Bravest Man in the Universe and on the DRC Music album Kinshasa One Two.

== Background ==
Clocking in at seven minutes and five seconds, "You and Me" is the longest song on Everyday Robots, being an amalgamation of two different songs, the first being called "You" and the other being "Me", which was explained by Albarn when he played at the BBC Radio 6 Festival. The two songs were recorded by Albarn and the album's producer Richard Russell. Lyrically the songs reference the story of two people, each living separate lives and Albarn serving as a narrator over both lives.

In an interview with Q, Albarn, spoke about many influences for the song. Albarn, who has long since been clean of drugs, began his relationship with heroin "at the height of Britpop" after he came home from tour one evening and casually found it in his front room. "I just thought, 'Why not?' I never imagined it would become a problem." He then recites a line from the track "You and Me" to the reporter, which is a song on his forthcoming solo album, Everyday Robots. "Tin foil and a lighter, the ship across," he sang. "Five days on, two days off. I'm happy I found that poetry," Albarn went on to say. "I can move forward now without all the nudge nudge, wink wink innuendo I've had in the background for years."

== Critical reception ==
Matthew Horton of NME wrote about the track in his track-by-track review of the album: "Call it the fulcrum of the record. 'You And Me' is an elusive epic that, like other songs to come, seems to pick over Albarn's life and manor with shouts to All Saints Road and Westbourne Grove. "Jab, jab/Digging out a hole in Westbourne Grove/Tinfoil and a lighter/The ship across/Five days on and two days off" – he's probably not giving us details of his miracle diet. This is Albarn reliving 'My Heroin not-quite Hell; it was actually a rather creative period, now you ask'. As the song switches from yet another raw, lovely ballad to an unspeakably great coda ("You can blame me, blame me, blame me...) you're struck by the man's rare undiminished gifts and how it's really not fair."

== Personnel ==
- Damon Albarn – main and backing vocals, guitar, piano
- Jeff Wootton: six string bass guitar
- Demon Strings - strings
- Brian Eno - backing vocals, synthesizer, additional production
- Richard Russell – production, drum programming, drums
- Jerome O'Connell - steel pans
- Stephen Sedgwick – recording, engineering, mixing
- Mike Smith - steel drum, string arrangements
