= Fufanu =

Icelandic band

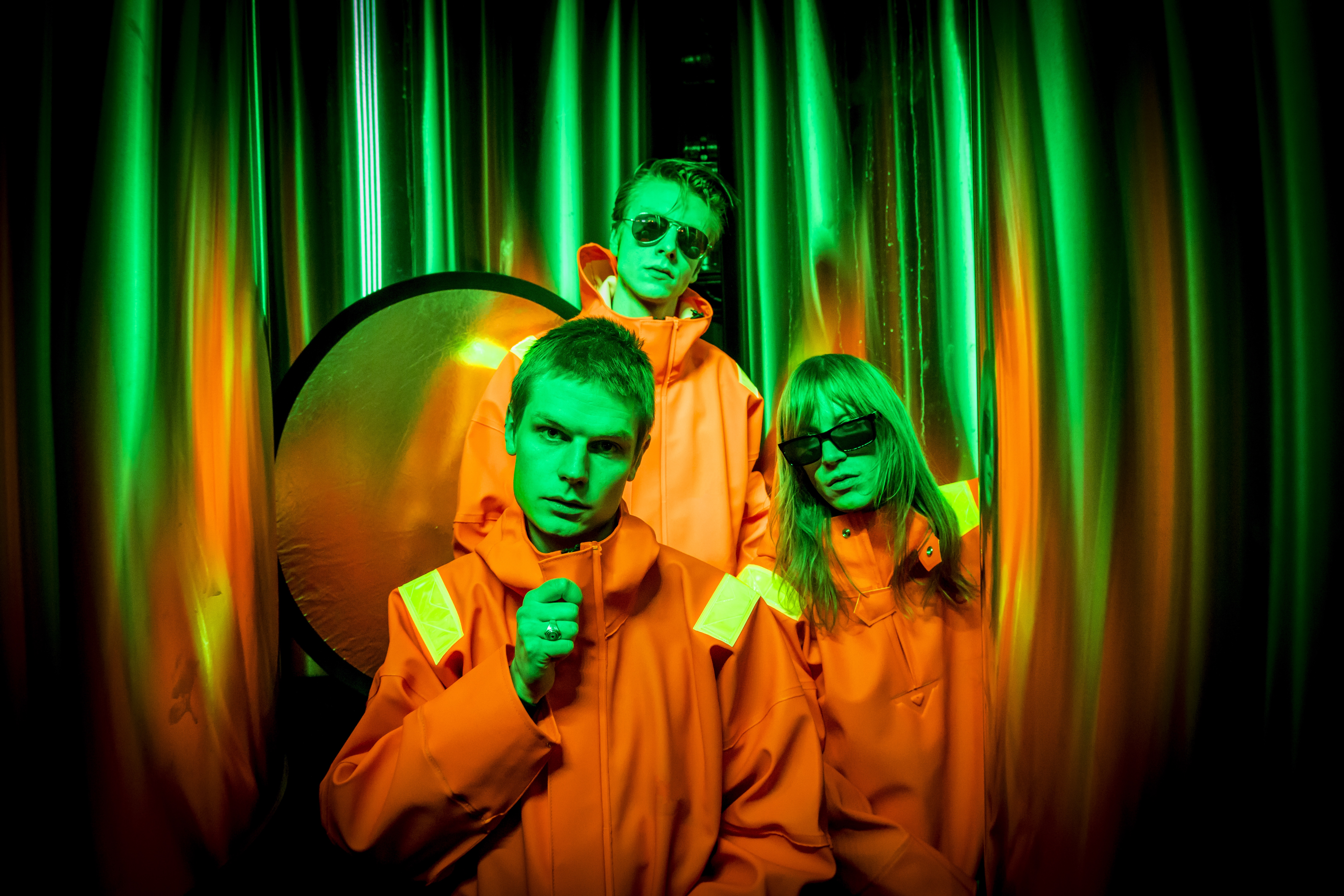

Background information
- Also known as: Captain Fufanu
- Origin: Reykjavík, Iceland
- Genres: Alternative rock, electronica, post-punk revival, art rock
- Years active: 2008–present
- Label: One Little Independent Records
- Members: Kaktus Einarsson; Guðlaugur Hörðdal; Erling Bang
- Website: www.fufanu.net

Fufanu is an alternative rock band from Iceland, formerly operating as a techno duo under the alias of Captain Fufanu, that draws influence from post-punk and electronic music. They've released three albums, Few More Days to Go, Sports, and a compilation album of three extended plays called The Dialogue Series, all of which were generally well received by critics.

== Background ==
Fufanu's vocalist Kaktus Einarsson, and guitarist/programmer Guðlaugur Hörðdal, were making music before Fufanu, operating as a techno duo under the alias of Captain Fufanu. the full ensemble Fufanu emerged after Captain Fufanu had an album recorded and prepared entirely, but the studios in which it was stored was burgled and the music was lost. When forming the band, Fufanu retained the electronic element with synth pads and bass, coupled with drums and two guitars.

In early 2015, they signed a recording contract with English record company One Little Independent Records, and released their debut album, Few More Days to Go, on the label later that year on 27 November.

The Iceland-based band have played festivals such as JaJaJa Festival and Iceland Airwaves, as well as playing alongside Damon Albarn at the Albert Hall and then playing with Blur at Hyde Park. They have also received substantial radio coverage as well live radio sessions, such as with John Kennedy of XFM.

In 2016, Fufanu completed recording their second album, Sports, with producer Nick Zinner of the Yeah Yeah Yeahs, and was released on 3 February 2017.

In February 2018, Fufanu went into their Reykjavík studio with producer Alap Momin. The outcome was 10 songs that were initially released in three extended plays throughout 2018. They were then compiled together to make up the album The Dialogue Series, which was released on 19 October 2018.

== Band members ==
Members

- Kaktus Einarsson – Vocals
- Guðlaugur Hörðdal – Guitar / Programming
- Erling Bang - Drums

== Discography ==
=== Studio albums ===
- Few More Days to Go (2015)
- Sports (2017)

=== EPs ===
- Adjust to the Light (2015)
- dialogue i (2018)
- dialogue ii (2018)
- dialogue iii (2018)

=== Compilation album ===
- The Dialogue Series (2018)

=== Singles ===
- "Circus Life" (2015)
- "Your Collection" (2015)
- "Ballerina in the Rain" (2016)
- "Sports" (2016)
- "Bad Rockets" (2016)
- "Liability" (2017)
- "Hourglass" (2018)
- "Listen to Me" (2018)
- "Typical Critical" (2018)
