= Photographs (You Are Taking Now) =

2014 folktronica song by Damon Albarn

Song by Damon Albarn

from the album Everyday Robots
- Recorded: 2013
- Studio: Studio 13, London, UK
- Genre: Folktronica
- Length: 4:43
- Label: Parlophone, Warner. Bros., XL
- Songwriter: Damon Albarn
- Producers: Damon Albarn; Richard Russell

"Photographs (You Are Taking Now)" is a song recorded by English recording artist and songwriter and frontman of both Blur and Gorillaz, Damon Albarn, from his debut solo studio album Everyday Robots (2014). The song was featured in a number of promotional teaser trailers for the album, featured on Albarn's official YouTube account in late 2013. The song contains a sample of late writer, Timothy Leary.

== Background ==
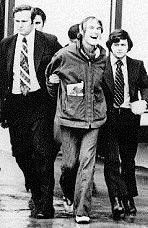
Timothy Leary, (Center), is sampled on "Photographs (You Are Taking Now)".

On 18 January 2014, the Warner Music Store was updated to include Damon Albarn's new album and its name was revealed – Everyday Robots, which is also the name of the first single. The deluxe edition of the album came packaged with a DVD of Albarn performing a few album tracks live at Fox Studios in Los Angeles. The DVD was filmed on 3 December 2013. On the next day, the album's information was removed from the website, which made many believe it was not supposed to have leaked so soon.

A series of trailers also appeared on Albarn's YouTube account as a way of promoting the album. The trailers featured a lot of images, mainly from Albarn's past and his previous projects. As well as a 21-second clip which featured Albarn at the piano and, before showing the title: Damon Albarn. First Solo Album. Coming Soon. A further trailer appeared on Albarn's YouTube channel, which featured footage of Albarn and Russell in Albarn's Studio 13 in West London recording the album itself, showing many instruments and song lyrics written onto pieces of paper.

"Photographs (You Are Taking Now)" contains a sample of writer Timothy Leary from the audiobook The Psychedelic Experience: A Manual Based on the Tibetan Book of the Dead. The sample itself is Leary talking the listener through a trip on LSD.

The use of samples is something that Richard Russell, the song's producer is well known for. Russell was the executive producer for Gil Scott-Heron's 2010 comeback album "I'm New Here", in which multiple samples were used on the album, Bobby Womack's "The Bravest Man in the Universe", features a sample of Gil Scott-Heron as well. Russell is an out-spoken advocate of sampling and has used the technique on the remix version of "I'm New Here" with Jamie xx of The xx.

== Live performances ==
Although the record will be released under his name, he said he wanted himself and his backing band to be known as The Heavy Seas. The band's first performance was at BBC Radio 6 Music Festival. "This is our first ever gig and it's quite nerve-wracking to be not only playing your first gig but playing it live on radio as well," he told the crowd at the venue and the audience of 6 Music listeners. "But I suppose I should be used to it after all these years." The gig also saw the first exclusive plays of songs such as "Photographs (You Are Taking Now)", "The Selfish Giant" and "Mr. Tembo", Albarn also played "Tomorrow Comes Today" from Gorillaz eponymous debut album and The Good, the Bad & the Queen single "Kingdom of Doom" as well as "El Mañana" from Demon Days and the Blur B-Side "All Your Life".

The song was also played by Albarn and his live band at the SXSW Festival, where he performed the song in its entirety in front of an American audience. The track featured the sample as a looped backing vocal as well and appears to be a very prominent feature on the song itself.

== Critical reception ==
In his track-by-track review for NME Matthew Horton said: ""This is a precious opportunity," declares a TV voice before resounding bass with almost techno depth takes us from the "patent courts of nature" to "the church of John Coltrane". A fairly circuitous route, sure, that sees time pass from the taking to the taking down of photographs. But the melancholy starts to give way to John Barry-esque strings – and suddenly our hero's sipping Martinis in a tux. More of an Alex James (Albarn's Blur bandmate) image, really."

== Personnel ==
- Damon Albarn – main vocals, piano, backing vocals
- Demon Strings - strings
- Timothy Leary – voice sample
- Richard Russell – production, sampling, drum programming, drums
- Stephen Sedgwick – recording, engineering, mixing
