= G-Star (company) =

Dutch designer clothing company

G-STAR
- Type: Subsidiary
- Industry: Fashion
- Founded: 1989; 37 years ago
- Founder: Jos van Tilburg
- Headquarters: Amsterdam, Netherlands
- Products: Apparel and accessories
- Parent: Independent (1989–2023); WHP Global (2023–present)
- Website: www.g-star.com

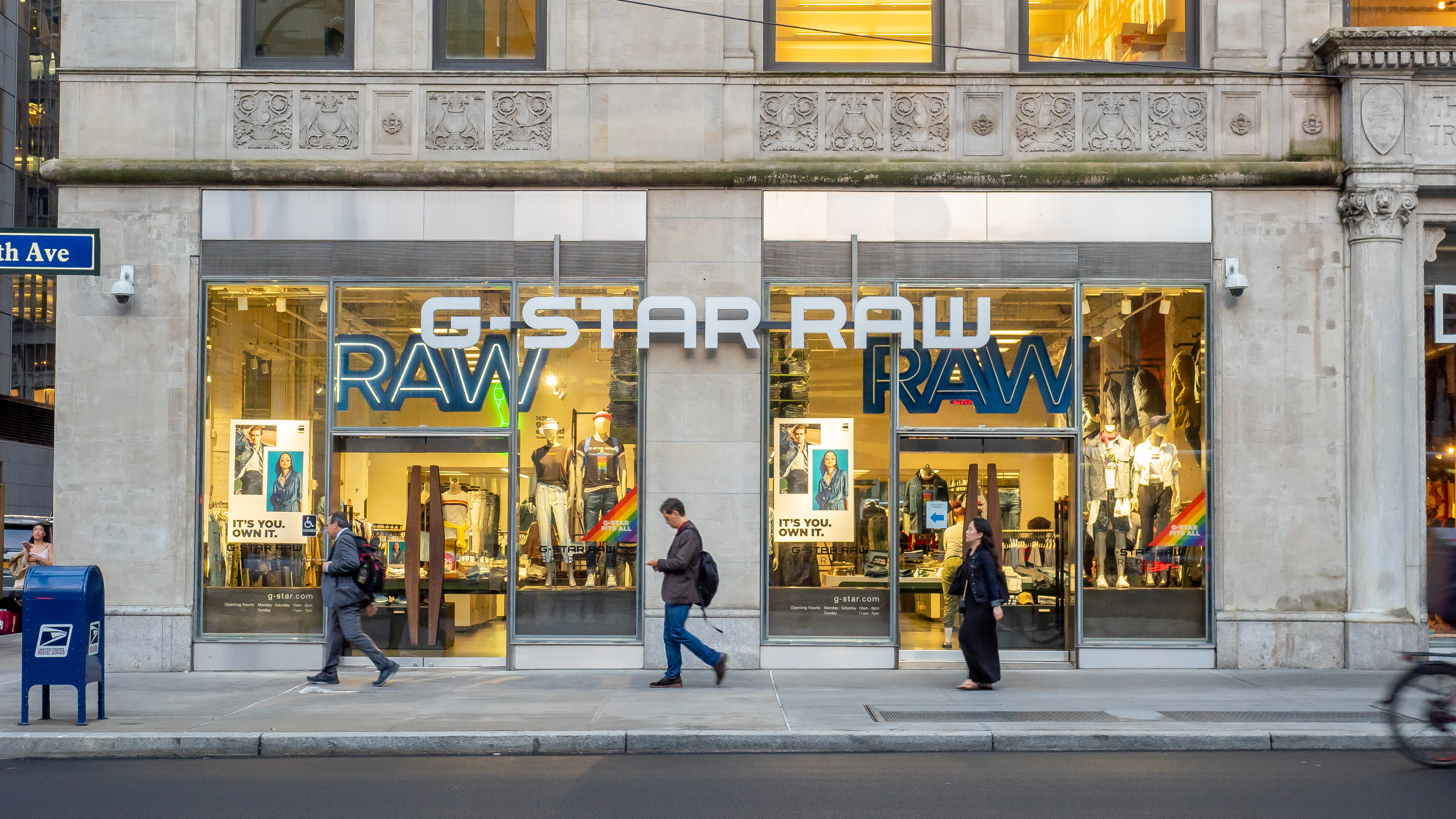
New York City flagship store

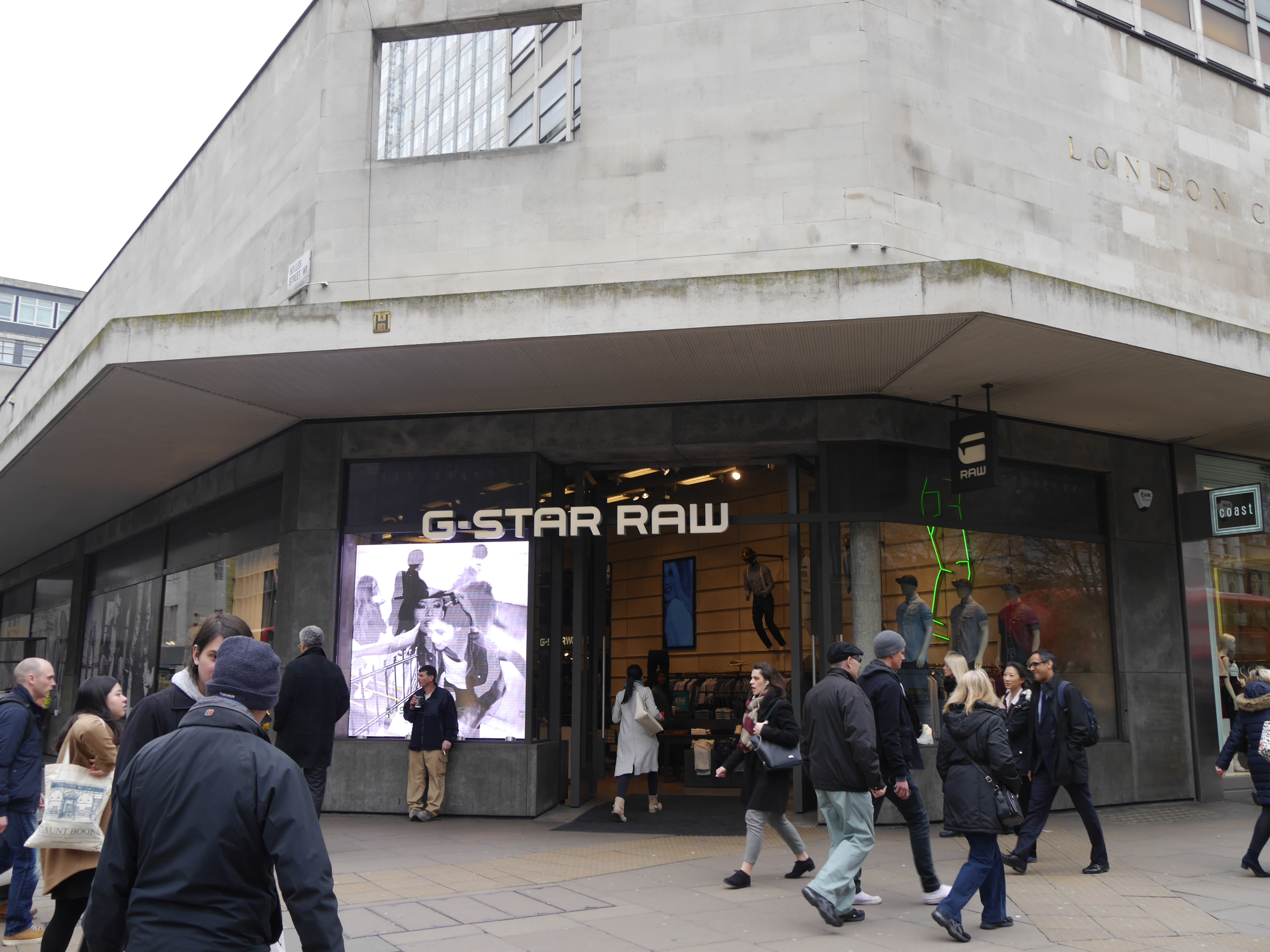
G-Star Raw store, Oxford Street, London, 2016

G-STAR (formerly known as G-Star RAW) is a Dutch designer clothing company, founded by Jos van Tilburg in Amsterdam in 1989.

The brand specializes in making raw denim—an unwashed, untreated denim. G-Star is influenced by military clothing. Inspirations of their designs come from vintage military apparel from around the world.

== History ==
G-Star was founded in 1989, specializing in denim clothing in the Netherlands. Jeans, shirts, and other articles of clothing were produced. It was originally named Gap Star but decided to change their name when going international to avoid confusion with the already established Gap.

In 1996, G-Star introduced raw denim jeans, which were untreated and directly from the factory.

In September 2023, it was announced that the company would be acquired by WHP Global. This transaction was completed in December.

== Stores ==
G-Star's flagship stores are located in New York City, Los Angeles, Edinburgh, Shanghai, Paris, London, Cardiff, Milan, Johannesburg, Santiago de Chile, Mumbai and the Netherlands as its home base in the most luxurious shopping street of Amsterdam, the P.C. Hooftstraat. In total, G-Star has more than 6,500 selling points worldwide.

G-Star's business in Australia went into voluntary administration in May 2020 following business challenges due to the COVID-19 pandemic. In August 2020, all 57 Australian stores were permanently closed after administrators failed to find a buyer for the business.

== Collaborations ==
Models for the brand include Liv Tyler, Max Verstappen, Mathias Ranegie, Girls' Generation, former World Chess Champion Magnus Carlsen, Clémence Poésy and musician Sergio Pizzorno. It was showcased at the New York Fashion Week from 2008 to 2011.

In February 2014, artist and music producer Pharrell Williams announced a collaboration between G-Star Raw and his textile company Bionic Yarn called "Raw for the Oceans," a collection of denim made from recycled plastic that is found in the ocean. The project was presented at the American Museum of Natural History in New York City.

In 2018, artist Jaden Smith also announced a collaboration with G-STAR.

In 2019, Formula 1 Driver Max Verstappen entered into a partnership agreement with G-STAR.

In Feb 2025, Walter Van Beirendonck x G-STAR, crafted a collaboration called "Denim with Balls". This campaign featured slogans including "Stitch Less", highlighting the fact that Beirendonck used glue to bring the clothes together.
