= Aitor Throup =

Argentinan artist, designer and creative director (born 1980)

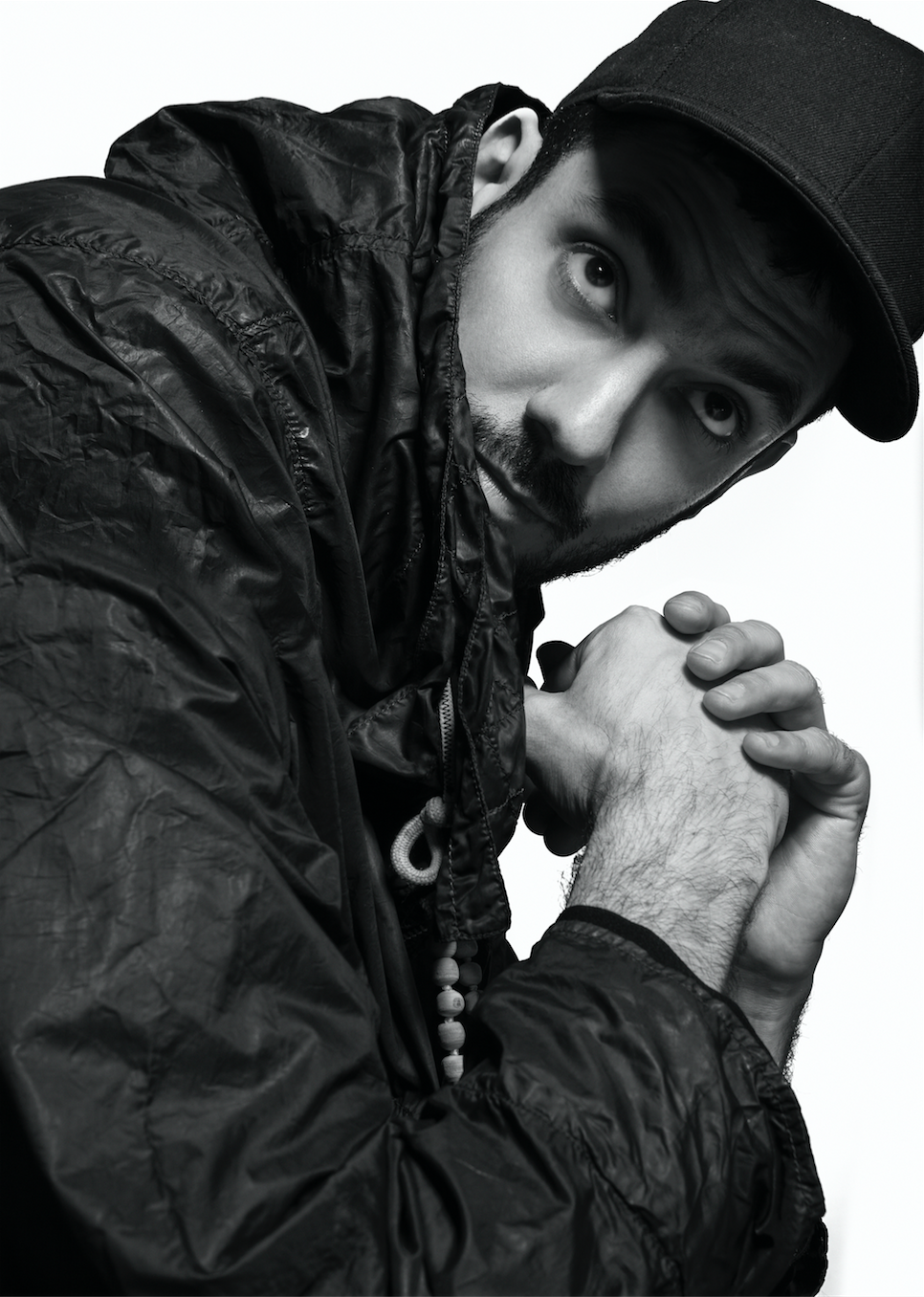
- Throup in 2017 (portrait by Meinke Klein)
- Born: 30 August 1980 (age 46); Buenos Aires, Argentina
- Education: Royal College of Art, Manchester Metropolitan University
- Website: aitorthroup.com

Aitor Throup (born 1980, Buenos Aires, Argentina) is an artist, designer and creative director.

Throup is best known for his menswear label 'New Object Research' which has shown at London Fashion Week Men's. Throup's G-Star Raw Research line is shown during Paris Fashion Week in a gallery setting. His work for, and collaborations with, Damon Albarn, Kasabian, Flying Lotus, Umbro, C.P. Company, Stone Island, and G-Star Raw are well known and often still studied.

Throup most recently debuted his modular costume designs for the 'Autobiography' dance work by Company Wayne McGregor. Aitor Throup's work is always informed by anatomy and movement.

== Early life and education ==
Born in Argentina, Throup moved first to Spain and then to Burnley, Lancashire in 1992. Growing up in Burnley influenced his interest in football culture and kit. Throup's interest in anatomy and movement came at an earlier age when his mother was training to become a medical doctor, and he would find himself surrounded by medical books and references.

After completing a BA in Fashion Design at Manchester Metropolitan University he obtained an MA in Fashion Menswear from London's Royal College of Art in 2006.

== Career ==
Throup opened his studio in east London in 2006. The following year Throup established his multi-disciplinary design house 'A.T. Studio'

=== A.T. Studio ===
A.T. Studio presented its first menswear collection at London Fashion Week titled 'The Funeral of New Orleans' (Part One) in 2007.

The following year, Throup began a two-season collaboration with Stone Island titled 'Modular Anatomy' and 'Articulated Anatomy'. Stone Island 'Modular Anatomy' and selected pieces from Throup's MA collection were presented at the 'Fashion V Sport' exhibition at the Victoria & Albert Museum in London. Throup was also commissioned to design and illustrate the cover of the December issue of Dazed & Confused Japan that year.

Throup also began working as a creative consultant for Umbro in 2008, designing the 2009 English national football team's official 'home' kit and the 2010 English national football team's 'away' kit for the World Cup. Throup later presented a third collaboration with Umbro in 2011 titled 'Archive Research Project', which launched exclusively at London's Dover Street Market.

In 2009, Throup collaborated with C.P. Company, re-designing the Goggle Jacket for the company's 20th anniversary.

In 2010, Throup presented 'Legs', a 45-piece retrospective of all Aitor Throup trouser concepts and prototypes to date at Paris Fashion Week.

In 2011, Throup was appointed as creative director of British rock band Kasabian, designing the artwork and global tour of their fourth album 'Velociraptor!'. Throup makes his first music video directorial debut for Kasabian's single 'Switchblade Smiles', and the animated TV advertisement for 'Velociraptor!' wins 'Best Music Ad' at the UK Music Video Awards.

In 2012, an ongoing series of daily sketches of musings and investigations in movement by Throup titled 'The Daily Sketchbook Archives' was published by Throup on his official website and Instagram account.

In 2014, Throup was appointed as creative director for Damon Albarn's debut solo album, Everyday Robots, resulting in designing and photographing the album and lead single artworks, as well as the direction of the lead single's video.

Also in 2014, Throup continued creative direction for Kasabian's 5th studio album titled 48:13, and direction for the transformative stage design for the band's Pyramid stage headline set at Glastonbury Festival in June of that year.

That same year, Throup directed a short film titled A Portrait of Noomi Rapace scored by Flying Lotus, and commissioned by online video portal Nowness to mark the website's re-launch.

In October 2014, Throup designed the 'Death Veil Mask' for Flying Lotus, worn during his American tour dates and one performance at London's Roundhouse.

In 2014, Throup created new designs for the District 13 and Castor & Pollux combat uniforms for the Hollywood movie The Hunger Games: Mockingjay Part 1, and in 2015 completed new designs for the District 13 and Castor & Pollux combat uniforms for the Hollywood movie The Hunger Games: Mockingjay Part 2.

In March 2017, Throup worked with long-term collaborators Kasabian again on their 6th studio album, For Crying Out Loud, album artwork, stating to journalist Bryony Stone "I really wanted to challenge how I previously approached art direction, through the deconstruction of the graphic design tools and their known formulas — which I have used in previous works with Kasabian".

In May, Throup co-directed Kasabian's single "Are You Looking For Action?" with Sing J Lee, and created a music video shot in one continuous take whilst streaming it live worldwide simultaneously. Extreme Reach commented on the music video after it was broadcast, stating: "The video was streamed live to Facebook, making it the first music video to ever be released this way, with thousands of fans watching as it was happening...Sing and Aitor worked together seamlessly to pull off the impressive feat, making music video history."

In October, Throup debuted his modular costume designs for the worldwide premier of 'Autobiography', the dance work by Wayne McGregor. In response to McGregor's 'autobiography' theme, Throup retrospectively looked into his own oeuvre to construct garments from memory fragments of his own archived identity. In an article on Dezeen, the journalist explained, "The concept of 'autobiography' also resonated with Throup, and he began his research process by looking back on his studio's 12-year archive to create a series of 'design archetypes'."

=== New Object Research ===
Throup announced a preview of his brand and product line 'New Object Research' at London Fashion Week Men's in 2012, hosted by fashion ambassadors Sarah Mower and Tim Blanks.

Throup's first complete 'New Object Research' line was presented at London Fashion Week Men's in 2013, and later that year he published his design manifesto for 'New Object Research'.

Two years later, Throup revealed his photographic series 'The Rite of Spring' in December 2015, inspired by Igor Stravinsky's The Rite of Spring which Throup stated that it "represented the death of the old me and the rebirth of the new."

In June 2016, Throup held a debut catwalk show for New Object Research titled 'The Rite of Spring / Summer / Autumn / Winter' during London Fashion Week Men's. Fashion journalist Tim Blanks explained it as, "much less fashion show than performance art piece." 'The Rite of Spring / Summer / Autumn / Winter' articulated sculptures and exclusive prototypes were then exhibited in Dover Street Market London.

=== G-Star RAW ===
In April 2014, Throup was announced as a creative consultant for G-Star Raw.

Throughout his tenure as creative consultant, Throup created the concept of the G-Star RAW flagship in London, directed the "What Is Raw?" advertising campaign, and designed the 3-D denim 'Staq' jeans.

In June 2016, Throup launched his first collection with G-Star RAW titled 'Raw Research', created in the innovation laboratory also set up by the designer.

Throup was appointed as Executive Creative Director of G-Star RAW on 25 October, after 3 years as a creative consultant for the company. WWD broke the news exclusively, with Throup explaining to journalist Lorelei Marfil, "I genuinely believe in the brand's manifesto to become the definitive denim brand of the 21st century, so I just want to facilitate that through a really focused vision and commitment to innovation".

In January 2017, Throup presented his second 'Raw Research' collection - his debut as Executive Creative Director of G-Star RAW. Raw Research II was presented in a gallery-like space during Paris Men's Fashion Week at Palais de Tokyo "true to Throup's highly artistic sensibilities" as noted by journalist Vanessa Hsieh.

In June, the third 'Raw Research' collection - Raw Research III - was presented in the raw and industrial setting of Galerie Lübeck in the 16th arrondissement, during Paris Men's Fashion Week.

In 2017, British Vogue broke the news exclusively of Aitor Throup designing womenswear in the Raw Research III collection, his first ever womenswear line. Throup explained the design process to journalist Scarlett Conlon, stating "Our approach to design is actually very instinctive from a product design perspective. In essence, we don't approach womenswear design any differently to how we approach menswear design, because we are prioritising product design values first and foremost."

== Awards ==
- 2006 Winner of the 'Collection of the Year' award and i-D Styling Award at ITS No. 5 International Talent Support.
- 2010 Goggle Jacket nominated for the 'Design of the Year' award at the Design Museum in London.
- 2012 Winner of 'XII Premi a la Moda Felicidad Duce' from the Superior Fashion School of Design in Barcelona.
- 2015 Awarded the 'Generali Special Award' at ITS No. 14 International Talent Support in Trieste, Italy.
- 2015 Awarded an Honorary Fellowship of the Royal College of Art.
- 2017 New Object Research 'The Rite of Spring/Summer/Autumn/Winter' runway show and collection nominated for the 'Beazley Design of the Year' award at the Design Museum in London.
- 2017 Awarded two The Lovie Awards after the Kasabian 'Are You Looking For Action?' music video which Throup co-directed (together with Sing J Lee) is selected in the Internet Video: Music & Entertainment Category.
