= Mkomazi, Tanzania =

Coordinates: 4°38′50″S 38°04′40″E

Mkomazi is a town in northeastern Tanzania in the Tanga Region.

== Places of Interest ==
- Mkomazi National Park- It comprises an area of over 1,000 sq miles. In 2018 Prince William spent a week there at the Rhino sanctuary.

== Transport ==
It is served by a station on the Tanga line of Tanzanian Railways.

== See also ==
- Railway stations in Tanzania
