= Kaktus Einarsson =

Icelandic musician

- Origin: Reykjavík, Iceland
- Genres: Alternative, Electronic
- Years active: 2008–present
- Website: kaktus.land

Kaktus Einarsson is an Icelandic musician. He is best known for his work in the Icelandic-band, Fufanu.

Einarsson's influences include Orchestral Manoeuvres in the Dark.
