= Pauli Lovejoy =

British musician

PAULi
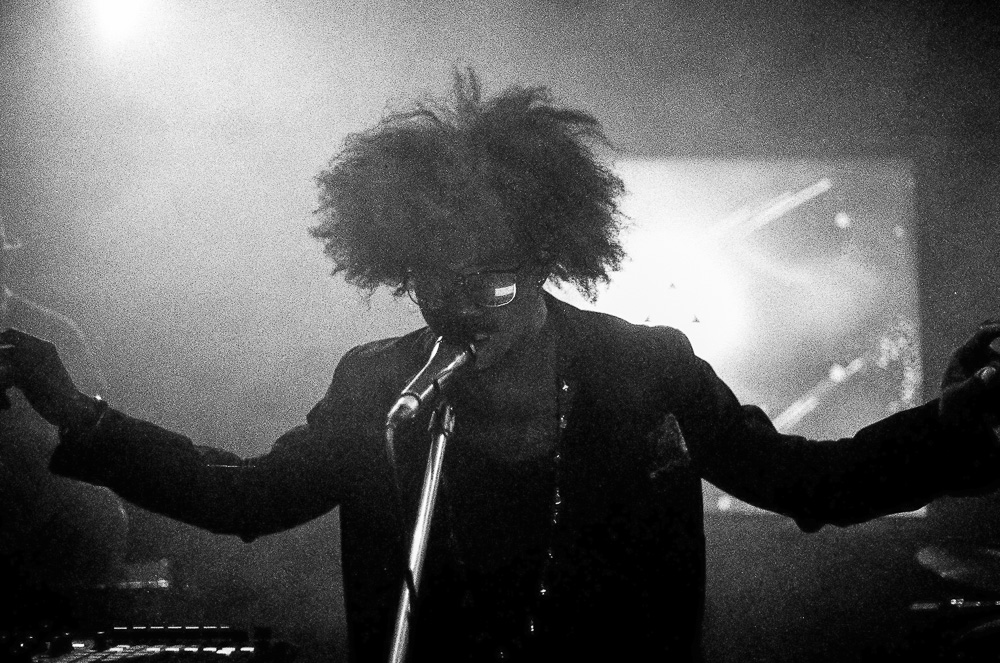
- Pauli, live at Timber Street London Showcase

Background information
- Also known as: Pauli Lovejoy, The PSM
- Born: Paul Stanley McKenzie; 8 November 1988 (age 37)
- Origin: London, England
- Genres: Pop, hip hop, R&B, alternative rock, electronica
- Occupations: Drummer, recording artist, music director, model
- Instruments: Drums, percussion, vocals, OP-1 synth
- Years active: 2005–present
- Label: Kobalt
- Website: www.paulilovejoy.net

PAULi (born 8 November) is a UK born drummer, recording artist, music director and model.

== Early stages ==
In 2005, Pauli won the Young Drummer of The Year award and performed on the BBC's Blue Peter.

In 2008, Pauli was appointed the role as music director for MOBO award-winning artist Jahaziel and platinum selling artist Eliza Doolittle. They have also appeared in acclaimed music videos for Duffy, Jordin Sparks, Shingai Shinowa (Noisettes), Raghav and Mutya Buena (Sugababes/MKS).

In 2009, at age 20, Pauli started working with Gorillaz, which features the Grammy Award-winning cartoon band's music remixed to visual effects and toured with the outfit, playing corporate club shows and headlining festivals around the world. Playing with Gorillaz Sound System introduced Stanley-McKenzie to Africa Express, which led to his contribution in the collective's international shows and the Cultural Olympiad UK train tour, playing alongside Paul McCartney, John Paul Jones, and a host of African musicians including Tony Allen, Baaba Maal and Amadou and Miriam.

In January 2014, it was announced that Stanley-McKenzie would play drums for Damon Albarn on tour in support of his debut solo album Everyday Robots, alongside Seye, Jeff Wootton and Mike Smith.

== Career ==
In December 2014, Pauli wrote "Give Me A Sign" which premiered on The Fader and championed by Stereogum as a “Protest Song” was dedicated to Mike Brown, Eric Garner, Rafael Ramos & Wenjian Liu, this was a collaboration with Brooklyn-based oil painter Amar Stewart and marked the first solo recording under the guise “Pauli Lovejoy”. The music for "Give Me a Sign" was co-produced with Brooklyn-based music producer and artist "Heavy Mellow".

In 2015, Pauli served as a music director for FKA twigs’ headline ‘Congregata’ shows in London (Roundhouse / Alexander McQueen), New York (Red Bull Music Academy), Glastonbury (West Holts Headline), LA (FYF Fest Headline) and at the MOBO Awards. Subsequently, this led to working with FKA twigs' label-mate, Jamie xx as music director for the live promo of his debut record ‘In Colour,’ which saw Pauli directing live performances on Le Grand Journal (Canal+) (Paris) and Late Night with Seth Meyers.

Still recognized as a prominent music influencer, Pauli was called upon as the primary talent for the Tanqueray "Greatness Starts at Ten" campaign.

On 24 September 2015, "i DON'T CARE" had its radio debut on Zane Lowe's Beats 1 radio show on Apple Music. The accompanying video premiered on Noisey.

On 27 October 2016, "Waiting (Getting On This Train)" the first single from his forthcoming EP, THE IDEA OF TOMORROW premiered on Zane Lowe's Apple Music Beats 1 radio show. That same week, The Fader included "Waiting" on their playlist of "11 Songs You Need in Your Life This Week.". In addition, "Waiting" was featured on Wonderland Magazine's Tracks of the Week Playlist.

"Believe in Me" the second single from THE IDEA OF TOMORROW, premiered on Complex. and had its first radio play on Annie Mac's BBC Radio 1 show. Apple Music included the single on their Best of The Week Playlist. "Believe in Me" garnered attention from Dazed and Nylon.

On 9 December 2016 Pauli released his debut EP, THE IDEA OF TOMORROW, with long-time collaborator and fellow London-producer Kwes on Kobalt.

In partnership with social media app, Vero, Pauli premiered his Visual EP, THE IDEA OF TOMORROW, an afrofuturist fairytale set on Kepler-452b, directed by Rohan Blair-Mangat. Pauli states “there is a vital synergy between my music and the visuals (as will be demonstrated with my forthcoming releases).”

In 2017 Pauli debuted his first live show as a solo artist during Paris Fashion Week at Les Bains Paris.

Their EP Secret Life of a Badman was released December 20, 2018.

Throughout the spring of 2021, Pauli released singles that culminated in the EP Secret Life of a Badman (Vol.2) which was released May 21, 2021. Later that year, they joined Harry Styles' band as a percussionist and MD for Love on Tour.

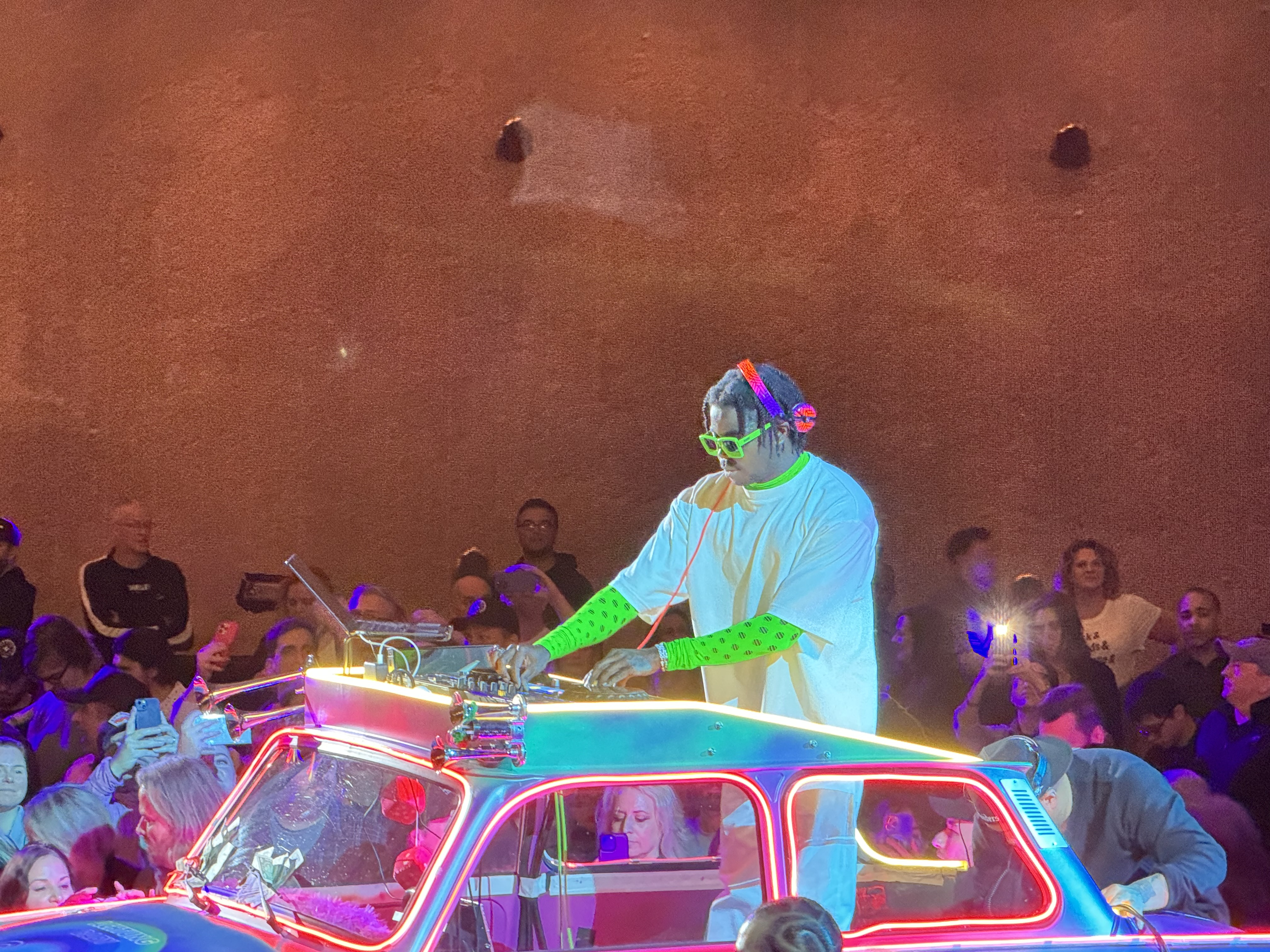
Lovejoy in 2024 DJ'ing as the opening act for U2 during their concert residency at Sphere

Lovejoy served as the opening act for Irish rock band U2 during their 2023–2024 concert residency, U2:UV Achtung Baby Live, at Sphere in the Las Vegas Valley. During the pre-show, they DJ'ed music from inside a neon Trabant that moved around the general admission area.

== Personal life ==
Pauli is non-binary and uses he/they pronouns.

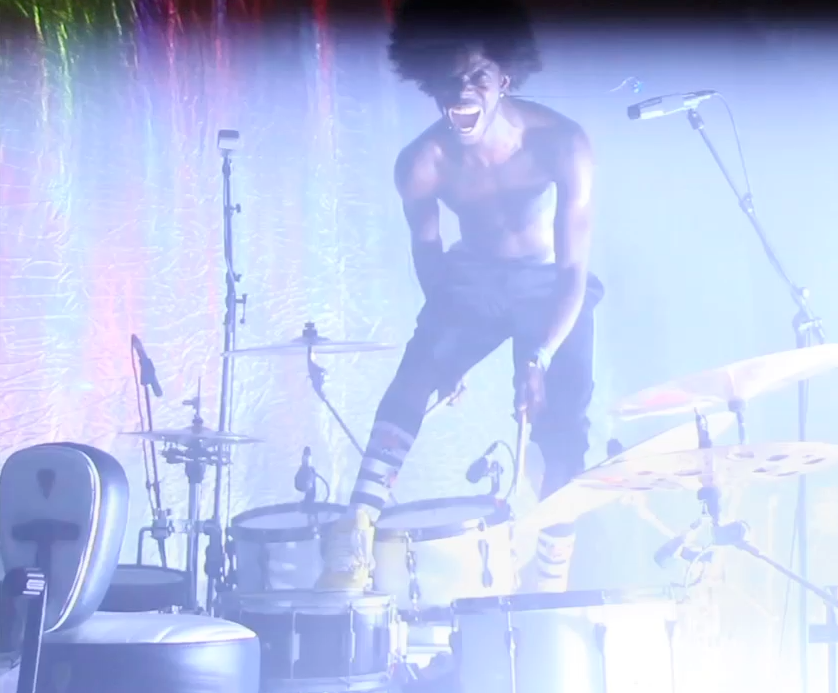
Pauli, live in Paris with Gorillaz Sound System 2012

== Discography ==
=== EP ===
- THE IDEA OF TOMORROW (2016)
- Secret Life of a Badman (2018)
- Secret Life of a Badman (Vol. 2) (2021)
- OFFAIR: The Power of your Subconscious Mind Vol 1: SPACE (2022)

=== Singles ===
- "Give Me a Sign" (2014)
- "I DON'T CARE" (2015)
- "Love TKO" (2016)
- "Big Belly Flow" (2019)
- "Buss Case" (2019)
- "Don't Hold Your Breath" (feat. Tawiah) [Kindness Edit] (2020)
- "I Got the Beat" (2021)
- "Cowgirl (Creeping)" (2021)
- "OPHIUCHUS" / "SAGGITARIUS" (2022)

== Studio recording credits ==
- Damon Albarn
- Eliza Doolittle
- Eric Lau
- Wolf Gang
- Jimmy Napes
- Markus Dravs
- Craigie Dodds
- Sampha
- Mr Jukes
