= Kinshasa One Two =

Studio album by DRC Music
- Released: 30 September 2011
- Recorded: July 2011
- Studios: Kinshasa, D.R. Congo
- Genres: Congolese; Afrobeats; trip hop; electronica; worldbeat; ndule
- Length: 51:14
- Labels: Warp, Oxfam
- Producer: Various

Damon Albarn chronology
The Fall (2010)	Kinshasa One Two (2011)	The Singles Collection 2001–2011 (2011)

Professional ratings
Aggregate scores
Source	Rating
Metacritic	(71/100)
Review scores
Source	Rating
AllMusic	3.5/5 stars
Mixmag	4/5 stars
Pitchfork	(6.8/10)
Q	4/5 stars

Kinshasa One Two is an album recorded by Damon Albarn alongside ten producers of the newly established DRC Music to benefit Oxfam's work in the Democratic Republic of the Congo.

== Background ==
Recorded in Kinshasa, Congo, within five out of nine days spent there during July 2011, the album was intended to shine a light on contemporary Congolese musicians, featuring more than 50 local performers, notably Nelly Liyemge, Jupiter Bokondji & Okwess International and Bokatola System. DRC Music is composed of producers Damon Albarn, Dan the Automator, XL Recordings managers Richard Russell & Rodaidh McDonald, Jneiro Jarel, DJ Darren Cunningham aka Actress, Marc Antoine, Alwest, Remi Kabaka Jr., Totally Enormous Extinct Dinosaurs and Kwes.

Album was released digitally by Warp Records on 3 October 2011, followed by a CD edition in digipak and a deluxe vinyl edition plus three bonus tracks later on 7 November 2011, with album artwork by Aitor Throup and Hardy Blechman.

== Song information ==
Damon Albarn himself sings on "Hallo", also the only single from the album, released promotionally on compact disc. The song "Love" is completely a cappella with no music and serves both as an interlude and prelude to "Lingala". There is a hidden track only on the CD. Also, a code to access three further bonus tracks, including a heavy version of track 6, "Lourds", is given in the CD/vinyl booklets.

== Track listing ==
No.	Title	Producer(s)	Length
1.	"Hallo" (featuring Tout Puissant Mukalo & Nelly Liyemge)	Richard Russell & Damon Albarn	3:38
2.	"K-Town" (featuring N’Gotshima & Bebson)	Dan the Automator	3:51
3.	"African Space Anthem" (featuring Ewing Sima)	Jneiro Jarel	3:06
4.	"Love" (featuring Love)	Totally Enormous Extinct Dinosaurs	1:02
5.	"Lingala" (featuring Bokatola System & Evala Litongo)	Totally Enormous Extinct Dinosaurs	4:56
6.	"Lourds" (featuring Yende Bongongo)	Yende Bongongo, Bokatola System	2:18
7.	"Respect of the Rules" (featuring Loi X Liberal)	Richard Russell	3:05
8.	"We Come from the Forest" (featuring Bokatola System)	Bokatola System	4:29
9.	"Customs" (featuring Bokatola System)	Kwes	2:32
10.	"Virginia" (featuring Magakala Virginia Yollande & Yowa Hollande)	Totally Enormous Extinct Dinosaurs	2:59
11.	"Ah Congo" (featuring Jupiter Bokondji & Bokatola System)	Rodaidh McDonald	3:59
12.	"Three Piece Sweet Part 1 & 2" (featuring Bebson)	Actress, Kwes, Remi Kabaka Jr.	3:44
13.	"If You Wish to Stay Awake" (featuring Washiba)	Kwes, Richard Russell	3:12
14.	"Departure" (featuring Bokatola System)	Kwes	7:08
Total length:			51:14

== Personnel ==
- Damon Albarn – vocals, synthesizer, bass guitar, omnichord, producer, programming
- Richard Russell – producer, engineer, programming, effects
- Dan the Automator – producer
- Jneiro Jarel – producer
- Actress – producer
- Totally Enormous Extinct Dinosaurs – producer
- Marc Antoine – producer
- Alwest – producer
- Remi Kabaka Jr. – producer
- Rodaidh McDonald – producer, engineer
- Kwes – producer
- Stephen Sedgwick – engineer, mixing
- John Foyle – assistant engineer
- Kevin Metcalfe – mastering
- Aitor Throup – art direction
- Hardy Blechman – art direction
- Simon Phipps – photography
- Gareth Pritchard – retouching
- Tout Puissant Mukalo – vocals
- Nelly Liyemge – vocals
- N’Gotshima – vocals
- Bebson – vocals
- Ewing Sima – vocals, percussion
- Love – vocals
- Bokatola System – vocals, percussion, producer
- Evala Litongo – vocals
- Yende Bongongo – vocals, producer
- Loi X Liberal – vocals
- Magakala Virginia Yollande – vocals
- Yowa Hollande – vocals
- Jupiter Bokondji – vocals
- Washiba – vocals
- Cubain Kabeya – drums, percussion
- Okwess International – percussion
- Odon Asok – percussion
- Boyo Kani – percussion
- Lionel Kizaba – percussion
- Pay Kumbi – percussion
- Bercy Makamba – percussion
- Michel Nsimi – percussion
- Bitsindou Scafio – percussion
- Pierre Sylvaine – percussion
- Djanga Weny – percussion
- Tshetshe Yenge – percussion
- Tshamala Mufubela – flute
- Padou Nkoyi – guitar

== Release history ==
Region	Date	Format	Label
Australia	30 September 2011	Digital download	Warp Records
Germany	30 September 2011	Digital download	Warp Records
Ireland	30 September 2011	Digital download	Warp Records
New Zealand	30 September 2011	Digital download	Warp Records
United Kingdom	2 October 2011	Digital download	Warp Records
France	3 October 2011	Digital download	Warp Records
Italy	3 October 2011	Digital download	Warp Records
Portugal	3 October 2011	Digital download	Warp Records
Spain	3 October 2011	Digital download	Warp Records
Canada	4 October 2011	Digital download	Warp Records
Mexico	4 October 2011	Digital download	Warp Records
United States	4 October 2011	Digital download	Warp Records

Physical release: 7 November 2011
