= Jeff Wootton =

English musician (born 1987)

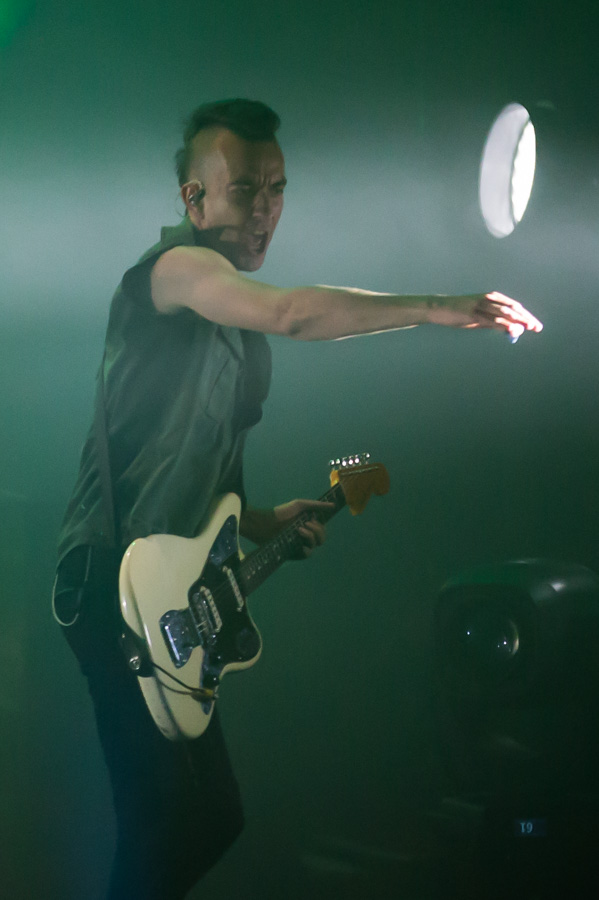
- Wootton performing with Gorillaz in 2017.

Background information
- Born: Geoffrey Wootton; 12 May 1987 (age 39); Manchester, England
- Genres: Alternative rock; electronic; experimental rock; trip hop
- Occupations: Musician; songwriter
- Instruments: Guitar; bass
- Years active: 2007–present
- Member of: Gorillaz
- Website: www.jeffwootton.net

Geoffrey Wootton (born 12 May 1987) is an English musician and songwriter from Manchester. He has been the lead guitarist in the Gorillaz live band since 2010.

A long time collaborator with Damon Albarn, he has also collaborated with Brian Eno, Massive Attack, British artist Damien Hirst, Noel Gallagher, MF Doom, Liam Gallagher, Beady Eye, Nick Zinner, Mark Ronson, and Damo Suzuki from Can.

== Gorillaz ==
Wootton joined Gorillaz as their lead guitarist in 2010 alongside Mick Jones and Paul Simonon of The Clash. Gorillaz kicked off their first ever world tour to rave reviews with performances including headlining Coachella Valley Music and Arts Festival, Glastonbury and Roskilde with guest performances by Lou Reed, Mos Def, Bobby Womack, Mark E. Smith, Mick Jones, Paul Simonon, Snoop Dogg, De La Soul and Hypnotic Brass Ensemble. They were the first British band to play a gig in Damascus, Syria

In July 2017, With the release of Humanz Gorillaz embarked upon the Humanz Tour, the band's second world tour and first since 2010. With 53 scheduled shows and lasting over 1 year, the tour was Gorillaz' longest tour in their history. The tour featured performances by Vince Staples, Pusha T, Noel Gallagher, Kilo Kish and Kali Uchis. The tour continued with the release of The Now Now into 2018 and played a string of summer festivals that finished with US tour totalling 95 shows.

== Other collaborations ==
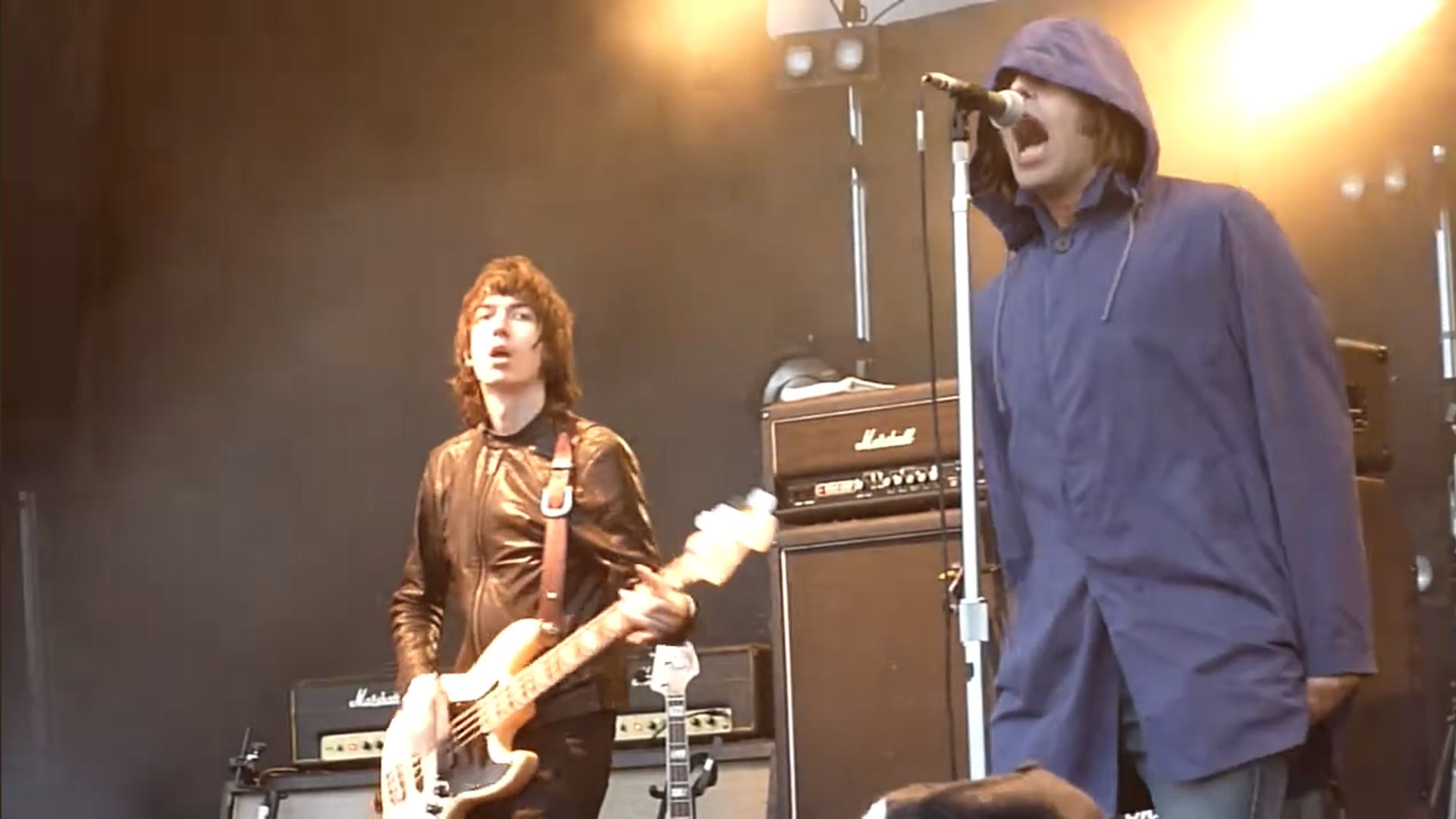
Wootton (left) performing with Beady Eye in 2011

At the age of 22, Wootton was recruited by Oasis frontman Liam Gallagher to perform in Beady Eye after the break-up of Oasis. He joined them on stage for the 2012 Summer Olympics closing ceremony, performing "Wonderwall" with the band. In 2013 after a world tour and playing on their second album, he left to pursue his own musical project.

In 2013 Wootton joined Damon Albarn, Brian Eno, Nick Zinner and several other musicians and producers on a trip to Mali, in West Africa to record an album as part of Africa Express.

On 24 November 2014, Wootton along with composer Andre de Ridder, Brian Eno and Damon Albarn released a 41-minute African version of Terry Riley's iconic 1964 minimalist piece "In C", with local Mali musicians through Transgressive Records. It was featured in Rolling Stone's '20 Best Avant Albums of 2014' They premiered it live at the Tate Modern in London.

In 2014, he joined Damon Albarn in The Heavy Seas. On 15–16 November 2014, Damon Albarn & The Heavy Seas' performances at The Royal Albert Hall were recorded to be edited into a live album. The project was released as a two-disc album called Live at the De De De Der.

In 2015, he appeared in Noel Gallagher's music video for "Ballad of the Mighty I" which was released on 12 January 2015, and joined him for a TV performance of the song "Riverman" on the Channel 4 programme, Chatty Man.

In January 2016, he contributed guitars on Massive Attack's Ritual Spirit album featuring Roots Manuva and Young Fathers.

In mid May 2017, it was revealed that Wootton had formed a collective with ex-Klaxons member Jamie Reynolds, New York rapper Young Lazarus, drummer Jay Sharrock and DJ Twiggy Garcia called YOTA : Youth of the Apocalypse.

== Solo career ==
=== The Way the Light (2016) ===
The Way the Light - a collaboration album with British artist Damien Hirst was announced in 2016. Hirst revealed he has created 10 pieces of original art for Wootton's album for a Limited Edition Vinyl.

In June 2015, Wootton supported the British rock band Blur at three dates including Glasgow Barrowland's and Blackpool Empress Ballroom.

In July 2015, he premiered his first track "The Eternal" through The FADER magazine, it became Q Magazine's Track of the Day and one of NME’S top 20 tracks you need to hear.

Wootton's first single "The Eternal" was officially released on 6 November 2015.

On 2 December 2015, Lauren Laverne from BBC Radio 6 Music premiered a new track entitled "The Eternal [Reconstruction]" featuring Nick Zinner from Yeah Yeah Yeahs and Bootie Brown of The Pharcyde.

On 26 January 2016, Vice premiered a new track, "Sonik Drips".

In March 2016, he supported The Last Shadow Puppets on Tour.

He supported Kasabian for two nights at King Power Stadium following Leicester City's triumphant Premier League Football Championship.

In September 2016, Wootton was chosen by Noel Gallagher to be his support act for the end of his tour show at Brixton Academy.

The Way the Light was released in Japan on 5 October for the only time on CD through Sympathy For Vinyl / Beatink Records.

He started the website Sympathy For Vinyl as a platform to release his more experimental compositions and collaborations.
