= Mike Smith (saxophonist) =

English musician

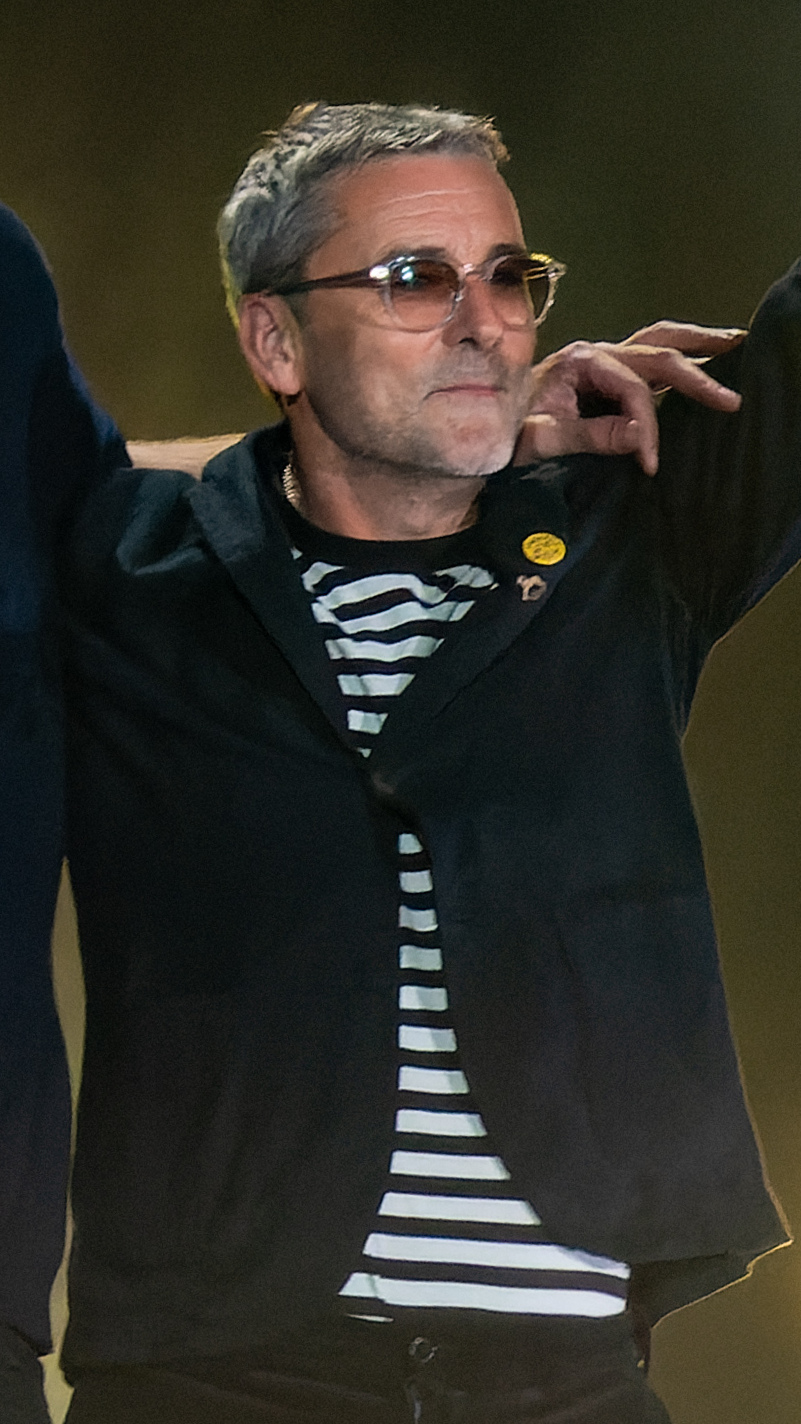
- Mike Smith on stage with Blur at Wembley Stadium 2023

Background information
- Born: Michael Smith
- Occupations: Musician; composer; arranger
- Instruments: Keyboards; saxophone
- Member of: The Ailerons Live band member of Gorillaz Blur The Good, the Bad & the Queen
- Formerly of: Touring member of The Brand New Heavies Jamiroquai
- Website: mikesmithmusic.co.uk

Michael Smith is a British musician, arranger, musical director, music producer and composer.

He is a frequent collaborator of musician Damon Albarn, having performed live with most of Albarn's projects including Blur, Gorillaz and The Good, the Bad & the Queen as well as in Albarn's solo band.

== Early life ==
Smith grew up in Bridport, Dorset and cites his music teacher Rex Trevett as the reason he took up music.

He obtained a 1st Class Degree in Jazz and Contemporary Music at the City of Leeds Leeds College of Music and a Post Graduate Degree in Jazz and Rock at Guildhall School of Music and Drama.

== Music career ==
=== Touring Musician ===
Smith gained experience as a studio musician, playing and touring with The Brand New Heavies and Jamiroquai. In 2015 he was part of PJ Harvey's live music installation at Somerset House recording her album The Hope Six Demolition Project.

=== Blur ===
Smith was originally hired as a saxophonist when Blur toured with a brass section in 1994. He later returned to Blur in the 2000s, playing saxophone on the song "Jets" from the Think Tank (2003) album and joining the Think Tank tour as musical director and keyboardist, a role he has reprised for the band on all of their tours since.

=== Gorillaz ===
Smith has been keyboardist and musical director in the Gorillaz live band since 2001. He has been the only constant member of the Gorillaz live band since the band's debut, other than Damon Albarn.

=== Film Score Arranger and Composer ===
Alongside Albarn, Smith co-composed and arranged the score for The Kid Who Would Be King as well as the award-winning Broken (2012 film) starring Tim Roth and Cillian Murphy.

Smith won a Royal Television Society regional award in 2013 for Best Music for his score to 8 Minutes Idle. He worked with Christoph Bauschinger to score The Exchange (2021 film).

Documentary film composing includes ‘Last Stop Coney Island: The Life and Photography of Harold Feinstein’, ‘Madeleine – One Year On’, and ‘Betrayal’ (Scott Calonico 2019 Tribeca Film Festival).

Smith was also a co-music producer for Aardman’s 2018 animated feature A Shaun the Sheep Movie: Farmageddon.
