= Hollow Ponds =

Single by Damon Albarn

from the album Everyday Robots
- A-side: "Lonely Press Play" (7")
- Released: 19 April 2014
- Recorded: 2013
- Studio: Studio 13, London, UK
- Genre: Indie rock
- Length: 4:59
- Label: Parlophone, Warner Bros., XL
- Songwriter(s): Damon Albarn
- Producer(s): Richard Russell

Damon Albarn singles chronology
"Lonely Press Play" (2014)	"Hollow Ponds" (2014)	"Mr. Tembo" (2014)

"Hollow Ponds" is the third single by Damon Albarn from his debut solo album, Everyday Robots. It was released as a single in digital formats on 19 April 2014, via Warner Bros. Records in the US. Hollow Ponds is the name of a lake in Leytonstone, east London, where Albarn grew up, and the song references several events from his life. The song contains a sample of a Central line train leaving Leytonstone station on the London Underground.

== Background ==
"Hollow Ponds" references key dates in Albarn's life, including the 1976 heat wave. "Read into that what you will," he said, when quizzed about its lyrical content. "And let's not talk about Australia." He also references Blur's Modern Life Is Rubbish name origin, which is from a piece of graffiti Albarn saw spray-painted on a wall in London in 1993. There are a number of years mentioned in the song, including 1976, 1979, 1991 & 1993. Also referenced in the song are the construction of the M11 link road and the former Green Man pub in Leytonstone.

The song "Hollow Ponds" was played in its full form on XFM on Thursday 20 March 2014. Albarn gave an interview with Danielle Perry where he talked about the track, and said: "1976 is a long time ago really, there's that realisation that a lot of things have been quite interesting in the way I turned out. They seemed to be worthy of some kind of meditation.That's what I'm trying to do in Hollow Ponds: go back and then realise that it's now. In a way, how do we know that we exist other than that beam of light that's our history?" Albarn also revealed that the song samples a train leaving Leytonstone on the Central line on the London Underground and also the playground of Albarn's old school.

== Release ==
The track was confirmed to be an official single via Albarn's official website and becomes a free download on 19 April with pre-ordering the album. The live performance of the track live from Fox Studios, Los Angeles is included as a bonus track from the Special Edition of the album along with "Everyday Robots", "Hostiles" & "Lonely Press Play".

Albarn released "Lonely Press Play" and "Hollow Ponds", on 7" vinyl for Record Store Day.

Albarn was the subject of a half-hour episode of The Culture Show broadcast on BBC Two in February 2014, which focused on his previous bands and his current work. In the programme he returned to his former homes in Leytonstone, east London, and Colchester, Essex. Speaking in the programme, he revealed that he found his first solo LP tough, saying: "I've spent so long in bands, playing to large groups of people, that doing a solo album is quite a difficult thing for me to do. That's why I put it off for so long." Speaking about being raised in London, he said: "Growing up in multi-cultural London in the 1970s played a big part of who I am." The documentary included clips of songs from his album as well, including 'Hollow Ponds', 'Hostiles' and 'Mr. Tembo'. It also featured a clip of Albarn's father, artist Keith Albarn, showcasing an interactive installation on a 1960s episode of Tomorrow's World.

== Official remix ==
An official remix for the song was released on Wednesday 16 April 2014, and was recorded by Remi Kabaka of the Gorillaz Soundsystem. The remix was released under the name "Hollow Ponds (Gorillaz Soundsystem Remix)". The remix itself was packaged with the single on Record Store Day 2014.

== Critical reception ==
In his track-by-track review for NME, Matthew Horton said: "One for the Blur fans perhaps – "Modern life was sprayed onto a wall in 1993" – but 'Hollow Ponds' is broader than that, building from witchy Radiohead acoustic guitar to a grand peak with a glum trumpet solo and taking in the drought of 1976 and the 21st century "dreams we share on LCDs". That's a call back to 'Everyday Robots', the dehumanising effects of technology, and the song itself finally resolves into a drone and eerie electronic excursion."

Dan Cains of The Sunday Times wrote: "The albums’s key song, this saunter back through the mists of time opens at the eponymous ponds that mark the southwestern edge of Epping Forest (near Albarn’s childhood home), in the 1976 heatwave. Like someone sticking pins in a map, Albarn revisits several staging posts, all of them full of magic, romance, loss and dislocation, blankly concluding each section with the relevant date on as a beautiful and haunting a song as he’s ever written."

== Track listing ==
No.	Title	Length
1.	"Hollow Ponds"	4:59
2.	"Hollow Ponds (Gorillaz Soundsystem Remix)"	3:20
3.	"Lonely Press Play"	3:42

== Personnel ==
- Damon Albarn - main vocals, sampling, backing vocals
- Seye - guitar
- Jeff Wootton - six string bass guitar
- Mike Smith - keyboards
- Nicholas Hougham - french horn
- Richard Russell - production, drum programming, drums
- Stephen Sedgwick – recording, engineering, mixing
