= Green Man, Leytonstone =

Pub and road junction in Leytonstone, London

Green Man
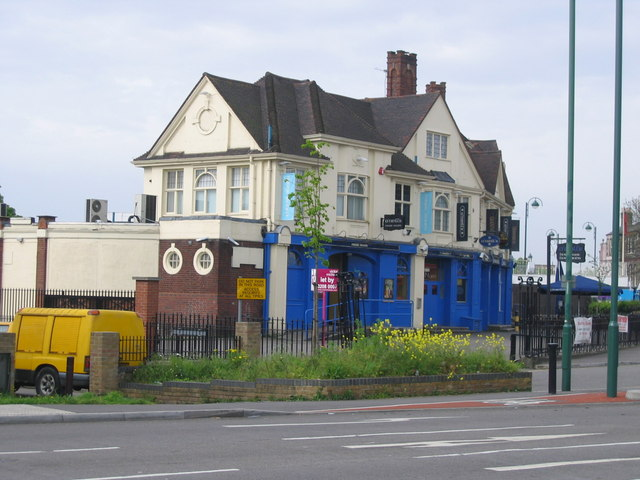
- The pub in 2008
- Interactive map of the Green Man area

General information
- Type: Public house
- Location: Leytonstone, London, England
- Coordinates: 51°34′14″N 0°0′56″E
- Construction started: 1668

The Green Man is a pub and road junction on High Road, Leytonstone, London. The pub has been rebranded as part of the O'Neill's chain. The current 1920s building replaced an earlier public house, close to the original site; which was built around 1668 and mentioned by Daniel Defoe.

A statue called Leaf Memory by Stephen Duncan was erected in 2001 at Grove Road and High Road in Bushwood depicting the Green Man sat with head lowered in his arms.

== The Green Man Public House ==
There has been a pub at this location since around 1668. On 22 August 1722, Christopher Layer and Stephen Lynch were arrested in the pub over a plot to assassinate King George I. A robbery by Dick Turpin reportedly took place outside the premises on 30 April 1737, when Turpin attacked Joseph Major and took his horse and around £7 to £8 in silver.

The pub is named by Daniel Defoe in his account "Tour through the Eastern Counties of England", published as part of A tour thro' the whole island of Great Britain in 1724: "the great road passed up to Leytonstone, a place by some known now as much by the sign of the Green Man, formerly a lodge upon the edge of the forest".

By the end of the 18th century, it had become the most important inn in the local area, as it sat on the main coaching road from London to Cambridge and Newmarket. In the early 20th century, the pub included a room known as the "Dick Turpin chamber" and was reputed to be haunted.

The current premises dates from the late 1920s. The pub has been rebranded and is now trading as part of the O'Neill's chain. It is referred to in the 2014 song "Hollow Ponds" by Damon Albarn, who grew up in Leytonstone.

== Green Man Roundabout ==
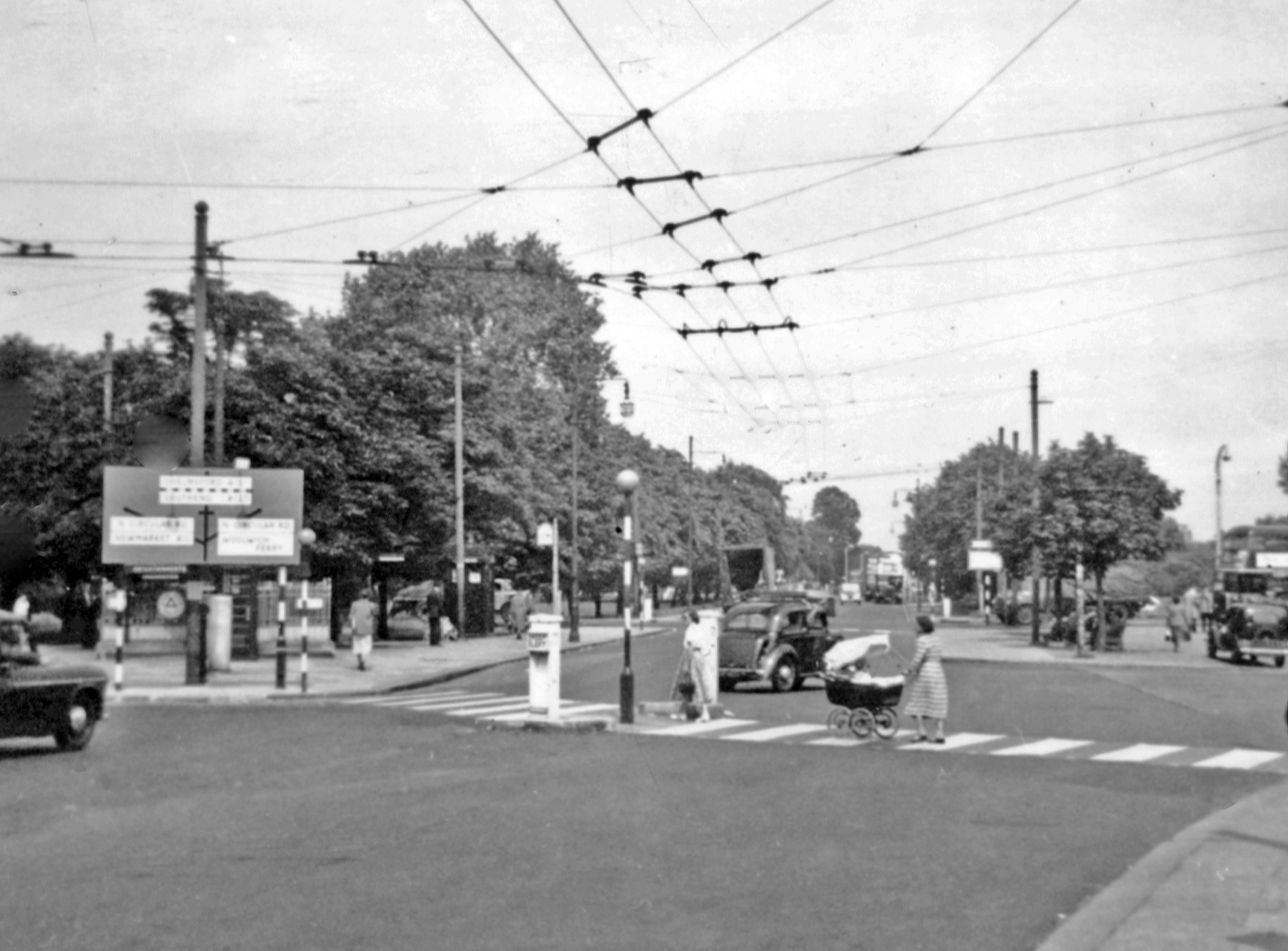
The road junction in 1955; Bush Road is on the far right, Cambridge Park Road in the centre, and the tramway terminal in between.

The junction is now a roundabout which connects the A12, a major road from London to Colchester, High Road, Leytonstone and Whipps Cross Road. There are a number of cycle lanes underneath the roundabout that provide access between Leytonstone town centre and Epping Forest. London Buses route 257 runs through the junction and has a stop marked "Green Man Roundabout".

The North Metropolitan Tramways Co constructed a tramway along High Road, Leytonstone, with the terminal junction at the Green Man opening in 1878.

The original route of the North Circular Road, planned around 1916, ended at this junction. The roundabout was constructed between 1963 and 1965; the A12 underpass opened in 1999.
