= Leytonstone tube station attack =

2015 East London knife attack

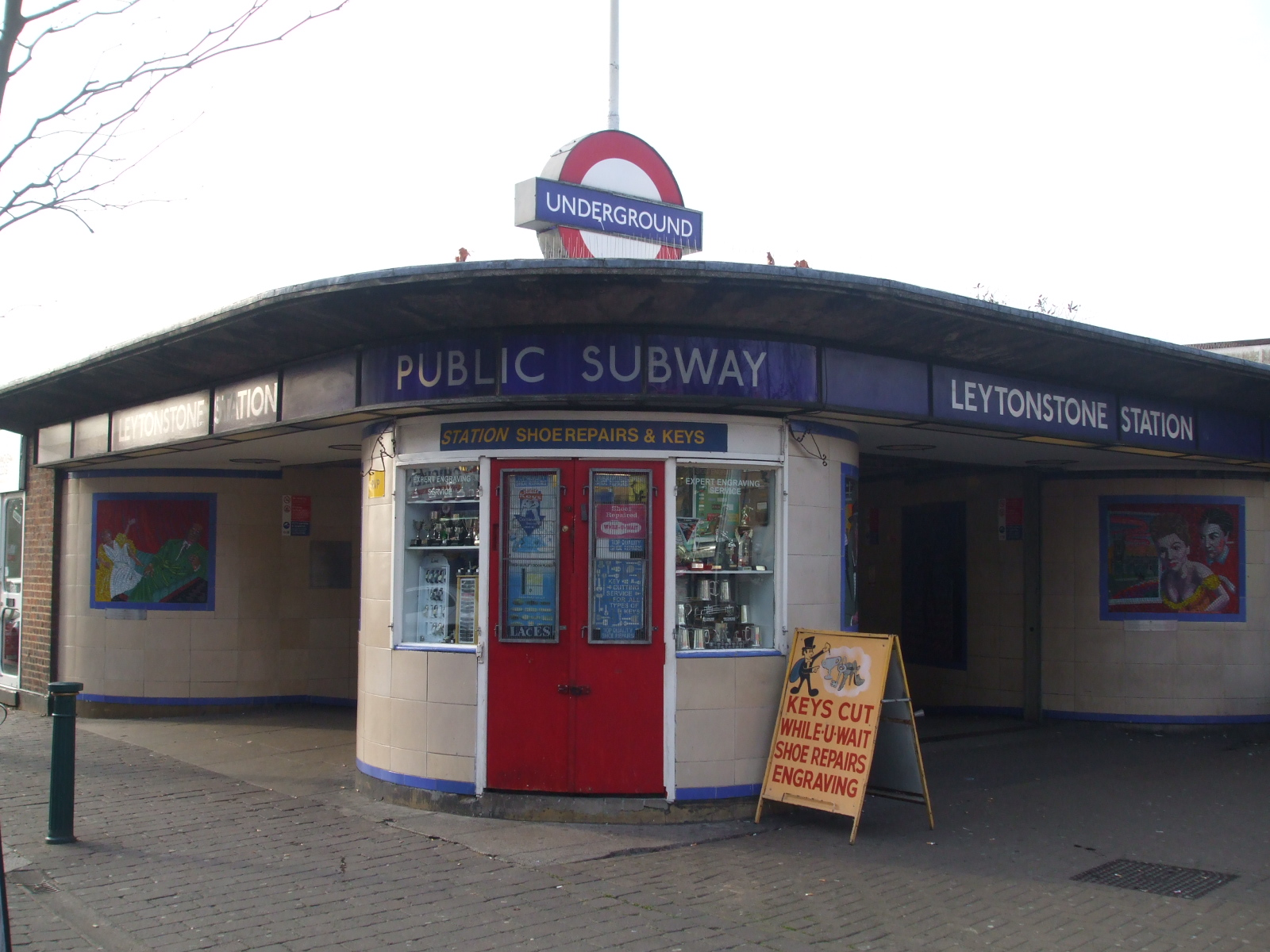
- Leytonstone tube station
- Location: 51.5683°N 0.0083°E; Leytonstone, London, United Kingdom
- Date: 5 December 2015; 19:06–19:14 (GMT)
- Target: Random individuals
- Attack type: Stabbing
- Weapon: Bread knife
- Deaths: 0
- Injuries: 3
- Perpetrator: Muhaydin Mire
- Motive: Mental illness inspired by ISIL-propaganda

On 5 December 2015, a man armed with what was described as a blunt 3-inch (7.5 cm) bread knife attacked three people at Leytonstone Underground station in East London. One of the three victims was seriously injured, and the other two sustained minor stab wounds. The attacker was named as 29-year-old Muhaydin Mire of Leytonstone, who was found guilty of attempted murder in June 2016.

After originally being classed as terrorism, the classification was later removed after the investigation concluded that the main motive was mental illness, albeit inspired by ISIL-propaganda.

== Incident ==
The Metropolitan Police were called by reports of a stabbing incident at Leytonstone station, where a male suspect was reportedly threatening other people with a bread knife. During the attack, the suspect was reported to have declared, "This is for Syria, my Muslim brothers" and shouted, "All your blood will be spilled".

Some bystanders threw bottles at the perpetrator while another shouted, "Put it down [the knife], you fool". A bystander received a cut to his neck while confronting the perpetrator. A junior doctor, who was passing the scene, tended to the wounded victim to control his bleeding, and praised the "brave people" who confronted the perpetrator.

At 19:14, the suspect was arrested and taken to a police station in east London where he was placed in custody. A Taser was twice used, once without effect, by one of the officers during the arrest. Police said that one victim had sustained serious, but not life-threatening, knife injuries, and two others were later treated for minor injuries.

== Attacker ==
Muhaydin Mire, a 29-year-old who had moved to the UK from Somalia as a child and lived in Leytonstone, appeared at the Old Bailey on 7 December 2015 and was charged with attempted murder of the 56-year-old man who was seriously injured. Mire was sectioned under the Mental Health Act for examination to determine his state of mind.

Mire's mental state became a central point in his trial and post-event evaluations. He was reported to have a history of paranoid psychotic episodes, and was in hospital for three months as a result of the first of these in 2006. After moving to Leytonstone he had to stop working "because of anxiety, panic attacks, and depression", and four days before the attack he had missed an appointment with a community mental health worker because of "delusions that he was being followed by MI5 and MI6 agents". His brother said that he had relapsed in August 2015 and that he used to telephone him with odd, delusional messages, but not with a political theme.

Around a month before the attack, Mire's family had sought urgent medical help trying to get him sectioned, but this was rejected by authorities, who found him to be of no risk to himself or others. The police later issued a statement: "The police were contacted by a family member approximately three weeks before the incident on Saturday. There was no mention of radicalisation; the conversation related entirely to health-related issues and the family were therefore correctly referred to health services for help." As a final resort, Mire's brother "decided to move him out the country [to see his mother]...I decided to book a ticket for him on this Sunday. He was okay as far as I know. He wanted to go".

In June 2016, Mire was convicted of attempted murder and admitted four counts of attempted wounding. In July he was sentenced to life imprisonment with a minimum term of eight and a half years and started his sentence at Broadmoor Hospital.

== Aftermath and responses ==
In a video of the alleged perpetrator being subdued by police, a bystander subsequently identified by the first name John shouted, "You ain't no Muslim, bruv. You ain't no Muslim. You're an embarrassment." John, whose full name has not been made public and who is not a Muslim, told The Sunday Times, "I saw the guy. I was like, well you ain't a Muslim ... That's my views, and I had to let him know that." He added, "People look at Muslims, and look at Isis, and think they're all the same. But obviously they're not".

Consequently, the hashtag #YouAintNoMuslimBruv trended on Twitter, becoming the top trending topic in the UK on the morning following the attack. The Guardian noted that it was a "perfect riposte to attempts to spread violence and terror in London." The Independent stated the "phrase has become a unifying call among people condemning the attack on social media." On 7 December, the phrase was repeated by British Prime Minister David Cameron, who said in a speech, "Some of us have dedicated speeches and media appearances and sound-bites and everything to this subject but 'you ain't no Muslim, bruv' says it all, much better than I ever could and thank you because that will be applauded all around the country."

=== Reactions ===
Local MP for Leyton and Wanstead, John Cryer of the Labour Party, described the attack as "barbaric" but stated it would be "dangerous" to directly link it to the British airstrikes against ISIS in Syria without proof.

Imam Imran Patel, of Leytonstone Mosque, said that the perpetrator was "not a member of the congregation of Leytonstone and for his actions he can only answer for himself. We strongly condemn any sort of violence and terrorism. Islam does not allow, and does not have any place for violent acts".

Kenan Malik describes the Leytonstone attack as part of "degeneration" of Islamist attacks from highly coordinated terrorism like the November 2015 Paris attacks to "low-tech" attacks with blade weapons and vehicles, a shift that brings into focus "the difficulty ... in drawing a distinction between jihadi violence and the fury of disturbed minds".
