= Wanstead Flats =

Southernmost part of Epping Forest, England

Coordinates: 51.5582°N 0.0281°E

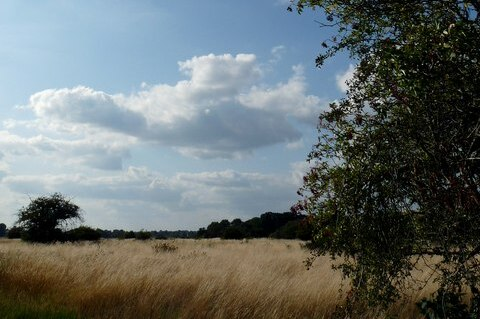
Wanstead Flats, grasslands and Epping Forest

Wanstead Flats is the southernmost portion of Epping Forest, in Leytonstone and Wanstead, London. The flats and by extension the forest ends at Forest Gate directly to the south. It now falls wholly within the boundaries of the London Boroughs of Redbridge and Waltham Forest, though until 1994 two parts of it were in the London Borough of Newham: one of these was the section between Aldersbrook Road and Capel Road east of the junction between Aldersbrook Road and St Margaret's Road, whilst the other was the strip running along Capel Road between its junctions with Centre Road (the A114) and Ridley Road. As part of Epping Forest, the Flats is managed by the City of London Corporation.

== Geography ==
Wanstead Flats is surrounded by the heavily built-up areas of Leytonstone (Waltham Forest) to the west, Wanstead (Redbridge) to the north with Manor Park (Newham) and Forest Gate (Newham) to the southeast and south respectively. To the north-west it is connected by way of Bush Wood to Leyton Flats, and to more northerly reaches of Epping Forest.

Roads and houses almost completely surround Wanstead Flats. To the east a low wall and high railing separate it from the City of London Cemetery and Crematorium. Three roads actually cross the Flats, effectively dividing it into four sections. The greater part of the whole area of some 1.35 square kilometres (334 acres) is flat, open grassland on the river gravel of the Taplow Terrace, which overlays the London Clay.

=== Bush Wood ===
In the northwestern part of Wanstead Flats, the grassland merges into a predominately oak woodland called Bush Wood, which gives its name to the Bushwood area of Leytonstone. Blake Hall Road separates Bush Wood from Wanstead Park. The northern part of Bush Wood is tenuously connected to Leyton Flats and the rest of Epping Forest by footpaths through the Green Man roundabout.

== History ==
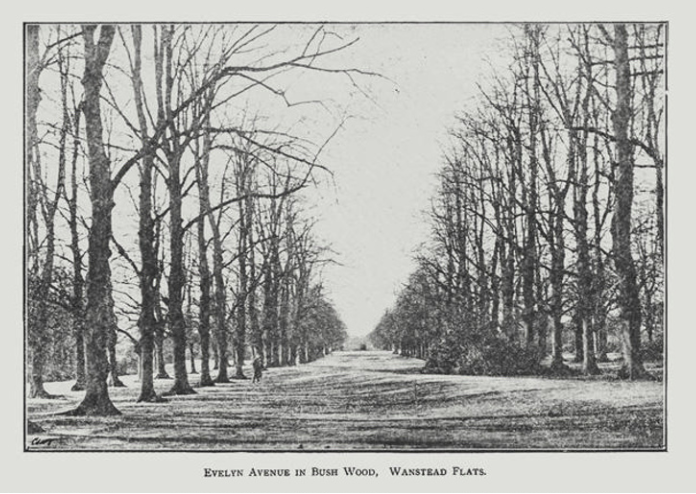
The Evelyn Avenue on Wanstead Flats in 1894

Though historically part of a royal forest, the nature of the area encouraged people to turn out cattle and other animals to graze upon this unenclosed land. This practice was enshrined in the ancient right of common pasture. Landowners within the Epping Forest area still have this right and cattle grazed freely until 1996 when the BSE crisis forced their removal. It is probable that continued grazing on this and similar areas of the Forest helped to maintain the open aspect which they have today.

At the end of the 17th century, an avenue of sweet chestnut and lime trees was laid out on the western side of the Flats into Bush Wood, leading eventually to Wanstead House; John Evelyn is believed to have been the designer. In about 1850, a house called the "Swiss Cottage" was built in Bush Wood in imitation of a Swiss chalet; it was demolished in the 1960s and replaced with a large apartment block originally owned by the Metropolitan Police but now called Belgrave Heights.

In the second half of the 19th century, the lords of the manors that owned the forest land began to enclose it. In July 1871, a large crowd gathered on Wanstead Flats to protest about fences which had been erected there by Earl Cowley. After the police had gone, the crowd broke down the fences and smashed them "to matchwood". In 1853, the City of London Corporation had purchased Aldersbrook Farm adjacent to the Flats for the construction of the City of London Cemetery. Critically, this made the City Corporation a forest commoner and enabled them to take the forest landowners to court, claiming that the enclosures impinged on their ancient grazing rights. The court ruled in the city's favour in 1874 leading to the Epping Forest Act 1878, which preserved Epping Forest, including Wanstead Flats, as a public amenity and entrusted its administration to the city.

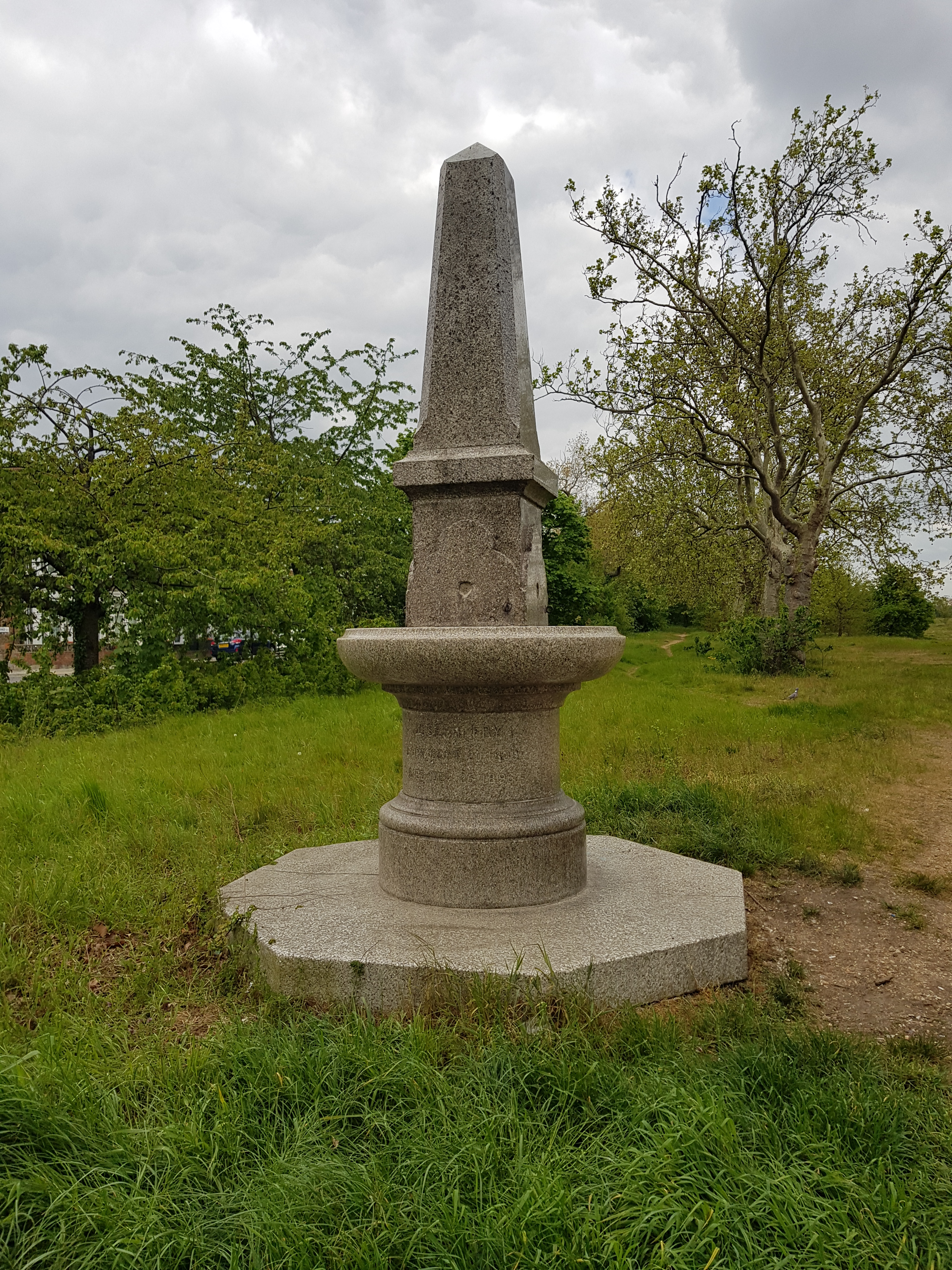
The Joseph Fry Memorial Drinking Fountain on Wanstead Flats.

A fair has been held on Wanstead Flats during the Easter holiday since the mid-19th century, following an earlier tradition of an annual cattle market. Alfred Hitchcock who grew up nearby in Leytonstone, is believed to based the fairground scene in his 1951 film, Strangers on a Train on it.

After drainage and levelling work in the 1890s, the London Playing Fields Committee approached the City authorities with a view to establishing football and cricket pitches. Originally only 25 acres (10 ha) were permitted, but this was later expanded to 60 acres (24 ha). A bandstand for concerts was constructed near Centre Road, it was demolished in 1957 but a circle of trees planted in 1903 shows its position. Nearby is Bandstand or Angell Pond which was completed in 1894 and a monument (originally a drinking fountain) to Joseph Fry who died in 1896, a supporter of the Metropolitan Drinking Fountain and Cattle Trough Association and the son of prison reformer Elizabeth Fry. Adjacent to Aldersbrook Road, the larger Alexandra Lake was excavated in 1907 as an unemployment relief scheme and named after Queen Alexandra, the wife of King Edward VII.

=== World Wars ===
On the night of 17/18 August 1915 during the First World War, German Zeppelin L10 dropped a string of bombs on the Wanstead Flats, fortunately resulting only in broken windows in 73 nearby houses. In October 1915 an emplacement for an anti-aircraft gun and searchlight with huts for their crew were built on the Flats.

During the Second World War, Wanstead Flats was used as a site for anti-aircraft guns, rocket launchers, searchlights and barrage balloons to defend against German bombers, especially during the Blitz. In 1944, a hutted camp was built on the Flats as an assembly point for troops preparing for the Normandy Landings; the same buildings were later used to house Axis prisoners of war. The effects of bombing in areas close to the London Docks led to a large number of homeless families and resulted in the construction of two estates of "prefab" temporary houses along the southern edge of the Flats adjacent to Capel Road, by East Ham and West Ham Borough Councils.

Immediately after the war, East Ham and West Ham Councils published plans for building two schools, a technical college and permanent housing for 7,400 people on Wanstead Flats. The move was strongly backed against local opposition by the Labour Government; the housing minister, Aneurin Bevan, declaring that "I regret very much that we have had to do it, but the people of East Ham must have shelter... The Commoners of Epping Forest must surrender to the overwhelming needs of the people of East Ham". A Wanstead Flats Defence Committee led by Stanley Reed, a West Ham schoolteacher, was backed by Leyton and Wanstead and Woodford Borough Councils, within whose borders the Flats actually lay. Leyton's town clerk said that "if West Ham want to build houses they might consider using a park of their own".

A public enquiry opened on 3 December 1946, the application to build on the flats being opposed by the City of London, 379 formal objections and a petition containing 60,000 signatures. Leah Manning, the MP for Epping, threatened to lie down in front of the bulldozers if the scheme was approved. Finally, in April 1947, the government announced that although the Epping Forest Act did not prevent the land from being compulsorily purchased, the scheme would not go ahead.

=== Recent events ===
In March 2010 the area surrounding Alexandra Lake was cordoned off following the deaths of more than 80 wild birds. Two men, Mark Page and Terrance Webb, were subsequently arrested on suspicion of illegally dumping chemical pesticides near the lake. The two men each admitted two counts of using a pesticide without approval and two counts of theft.

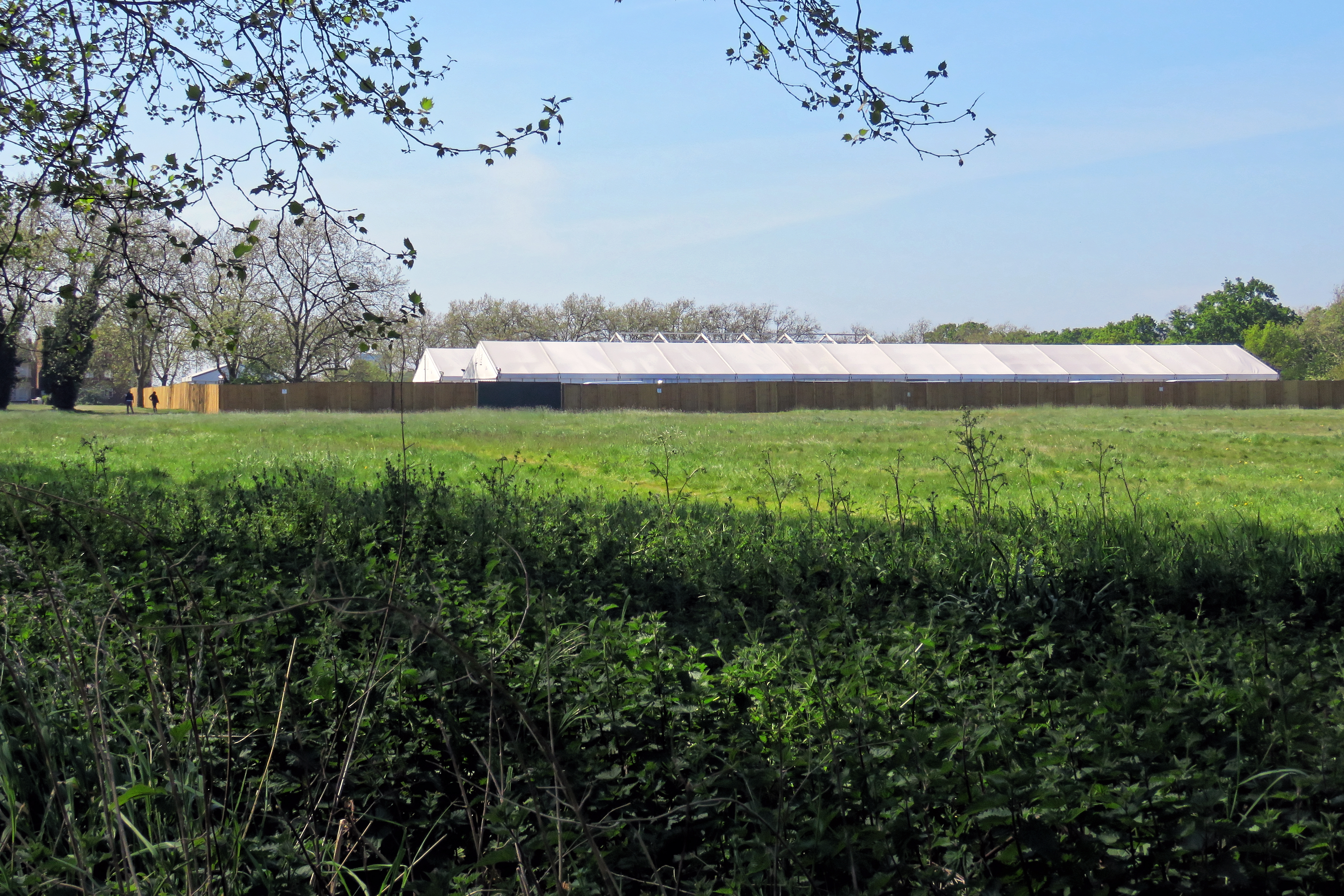
The temporary mortuary for the COVID-19 Pandemic on Wanstead Flats in 2020.

On 16 November 2010, a planning application was submitted by the Metropolitan Police to the London Borough of Redbridge to build a police hub on Wanstead Flats. This planning application was granted, and subsequently a Parliamentary Order (the Legislative Reform (Epping Forest) Order 2011) allowed the police to erect a "muster, briefing and deployment centre" on Wanstead Flats from 23 June 2012 to 20 September 2012, for the purposes of the 2012 Olympic and Paralympic Games. The centre was removed after the Games had ended. Another precaution for the security for the 2012 Summer Olympics was the siting of surface-to-air missiles on the roof of Fred Wigg Tower, Leytonstone, a residential high-rise building adjacent to and overlooking Wanstead Flats. Legal action to prevent the installation by the building's residents was rejected by the High Court of Justice shortly beforehand.

On 15 July 2018, a heatwave and dry conditions led to a huge grass fire on Wanstead Flats, which became the largest incident of its kind ever dealt with by the London Fire Brigade.

The easternmost section of the flats, between Aldersbrook Road and Forest Drive, was used to site a temporary mortuary in response to the COVID-19 pandemic. Construction started in early April 2020. The mortuary was dismantled over the summer, and the land planted with wildflowers in memory of those who died.

== Features ==
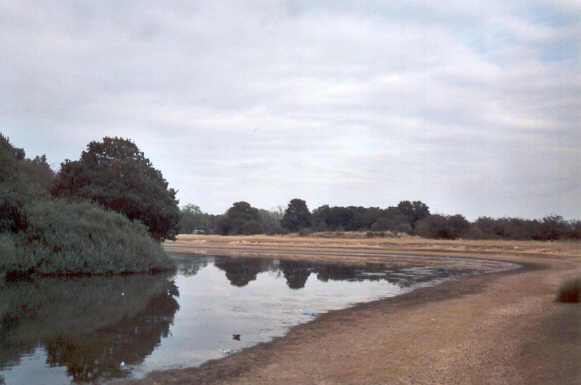
Alexandra Lake, Wanstead Flats

=== Water ===
Much of the land is liable to a degree of flooding after heavy rain, but also to considerable and quite rapid drying-out in periods of low rainfall. Drainage from the grassland should help to maintain usually three permanent open waters. The largest of these, with two islands to its credit, is Alexandra Lake. Its local name the Sandhills Pond may be attributed to the sandy nature of the low gravel mounds by its banks. The next in size is Jubilee Pond, which until 2002 was known as the Model Yacht Pond or Dames Road Pond. Until renovation in 2002 this had stone banks, and, as its name implied, was in the past used for model boating. Lack of repair and a water supply meant that for many years the pond was often dry.

The smallest water is the round pond by Capel Road, Angel Pond. This was named after Lewis Angell, the first borough engineer of West Ham, who was responsible for the construction of the pond during the winter of 1893–94. The spelling soon became corrupted, as early postcards show. This is a circular muddy hollow which can dry out completely in hot weather. The only other semi-permanent pond is that by Lake House Road known as the Cat and Dog Pond, presumably because it only exists when it has been raining 'cats and dogs'.

There are some drainage ditches, but few hold water for much time. The only running water used to be a year-round spring that was the source of one of the 'marshy' areas dominated by rushes that exist in some of the more poorly drained parts of the Flats. The spring, however, is now usually dry. During a period of lake creation at the turn of the 19th/20th century (when, for example, Alexandra Lake was created as part of a job creation scheme for the unemployed) it is said that the hollow at the junction of Aldersbrook Road and Centre Road was dug. It was supposed to have been a lake, but was not completed.

=== Plants ===
Scattered over the area are some thickets of gorse and broom, as well as a number of small woods and copses. Most of these were planted towards the end of the 19th century as a response to efforts by the Epping Forest Committee to break up what was perceived as a monotonous area of grassland. Together with the many trees lining the roadsides and some avenues, they add greatly to the diversity of tree species to be found. Older than these is an avenue of trees in the NW portion of the Flats, running from close to Ferndale Road in Leytonstone to Bush Wood. This is known as Evelyn's Avenue, planted by John Evelyn (author of Sylva, or a discourse of Forest-trees) on the instructions of Sir Josiah Child after he had purchased the estate. It formed one of a number of such avenues radiating from Wanstead House. Consisting of sweet chestnuts and forming one of the main approaches to Wanstead House, much of this is still visible after 300 years.

== Access ==
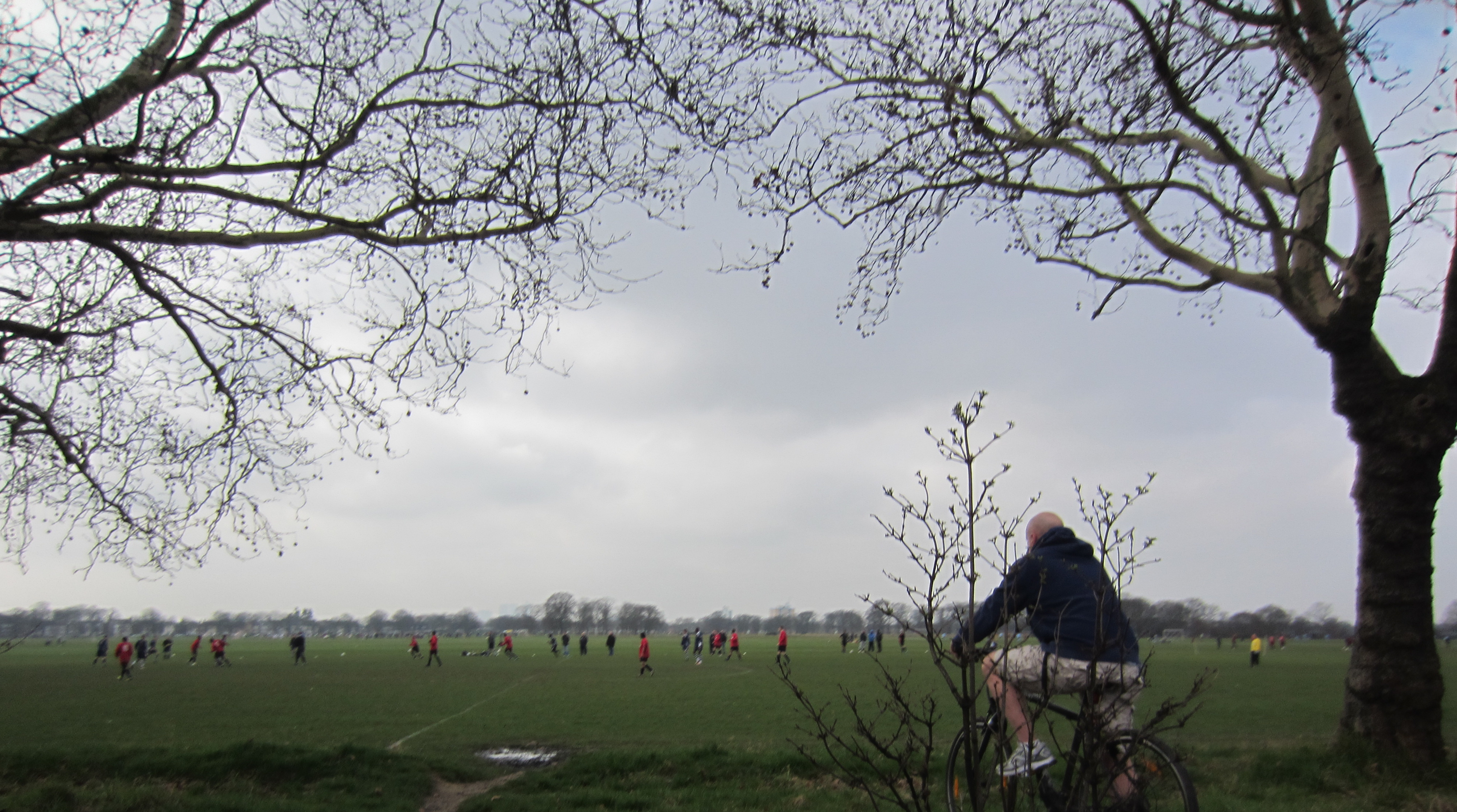
Looking south towards Forest Gate

Nearly all the perimeter of Wanstead Flats has a ditch, often with a bank, to prohibit vehicular access. The only vehicles normally allowed are service vehicles and bicycles. Horses may be taken onto the Flats and are supposed to keep to bridle paths marked by posts. There is considerable pedestrian traffic because of the number of people living nearby and the availability of the area for activities such as the flying of model aircraft and kites, bird watching, botanising and the exercising of people and dogs.

Portions of the Flats are also maintained as football pitches. Fishing in Alexandra Lake is no longer undertaken and model boating in the old Model Yacht Pond ceased when the pond no longer retained water. The area near the petrol station on Aldersbrook Road (where the sports rooms are) was used in the 1940s to house German prisoners of war. At the pointed junction of Blake Hall Road and Aldersbrook Road is a deep dip in the grass area. This was a World War II bomb crater. After the raid a wrecked United Dairies Milk lorry was found in the crater.
