= West Ham Poor Law Union =

West Ham Poor Law Union was a poor law union established on 31 May 1836. It ran the West Ham Union Workhouse. It was abolished on 1 April 1930.

It initially covered the parishes of East Ham, Leyton, Little Ilford, Walthamstow, Wanstead, West Ham and Woodford, with the addition of Cann Hall from 1894 onwards. This meant that it straddled several other urban districts, county boroughs and municipal boroughs set up later in the 19th century and early in the 20th century - West Ham (West Ham), East Ham (East Ham, Little Ilford), Wanstead (Wanstead), Woodford (Woodford), Leyton (Leyton, Cann Hall) and Walthamstow (Walthamstow).

== Registration district ==
In 1837 the area of the poor law union became a registration district. In 1935 it was reduced to coincide with the parish of West Ham and abolished in 1967.

== Rural sanitary district ==
In 1872 the area of the poor law union (excluding urban sanitary districts) became a rural sanitary district. The poor law guardians for the remaining parishes became the rural sanitary authority. Wanstead and West Ham were urban sanitary districts. Parishes left the rural sanitary district as follows: Leyton (1873), Walthamstow (1873), Woodford (1873), East Ham (1878) and Little Ilford (1886).
