= Joanne Fenn =

British musician and Olympic middle-distance runner

Jo Fenn née Mersh
Personal information
- Nationality: British (English)
- Born: 19 October 1974 (age 51) Leytonstone, London, England
- Height: 173 cm (5 ft 8 in)
- Weight: 57 kg (126 lb)

Sport
- Sport: Athletics
- Event: middle-distance
- Club: Woodford Green with Essex Ladies
- Turned pro: 2001
- Retired: 2008

Achievements and titles
- Personal best(s): 400m 54.57; 800m 1:59.50; 1500m 4:09.54

Joanne Ella Fenn (née Mersh; born 19 October 1974) is an English singer-songwriter and is a former Olympic middle-distance runner.

== Sporting career ==
Fenn attended Connaught School for Girls and was English schools 300m hurdles champion and later competed in the 400-metre hurdles and heptathlon. After a series of injuries she changed to the 800 metres and was a member of the Woodford Green with Essex Ladies athletic club.

Fenn finished third behind Kelly Holmes in the 800 metres event at the 2000 AAA Championships.

Two years later Fenn finished second behind Susan Scott at the 2002 AAA Championships and shortly afterwards represented England at the 2002 Commonwealth Games in Manchester, where she ran her first sub 2-minute performance with 1:59.86.

In 2004 Fenn won the 800m bronze medal at the World Indoor Championships in Budapest, Hungary and also broke the 1000 metres British Record before Kelly Holmes regained it later that same year. In July, she finished runner-up again to Kelly Holmes at the 2004 AAA Championships and at the 2004 Olympic Games in Athens, represented Great Britain, where Fenn finished fifth in her semi-final and did not qualify for the final.

Fenn had a serious knee injury and major operation on a grapefruit-sized cyst in 2006 and split from her longtime coach in late 2007. She then spent time in Lausanne to work with Trent Sterling a Canadian middle distance coach with a view to competing in 2008 Olympic Games but she did not qualify and subsequently retired.

Fenn is a special speaker for 21st Century Legacy, a charity set up by David Hemery as part of the 2012 legacy. In this role she visits schools up and down the country to inspire and engage with children promoting the Be the Best you can Be programme.

== Singing career ==
Fenn began her singing career in a local band, The Business, during her early career and was offered a place on the BBC talent show Fame Academy.
