= Harold Spurr =

English cricketer

Harold Spurr (17 June 1889 – 21 December 1962) was an English cricketer who played as a right-handed batsman for Essex. He was born in Leytonstone and died in Dunmow.

Spurr made a single first-class appearance during the West Indian tour of England in 1923. Batting in the upper order, he scored 13 runs across two innings and was not selected again.
