= West Ham Union Workhouse =

Building in Leytonstone, London, England

Coordinates: 51°33′18″N 0°00′14″E

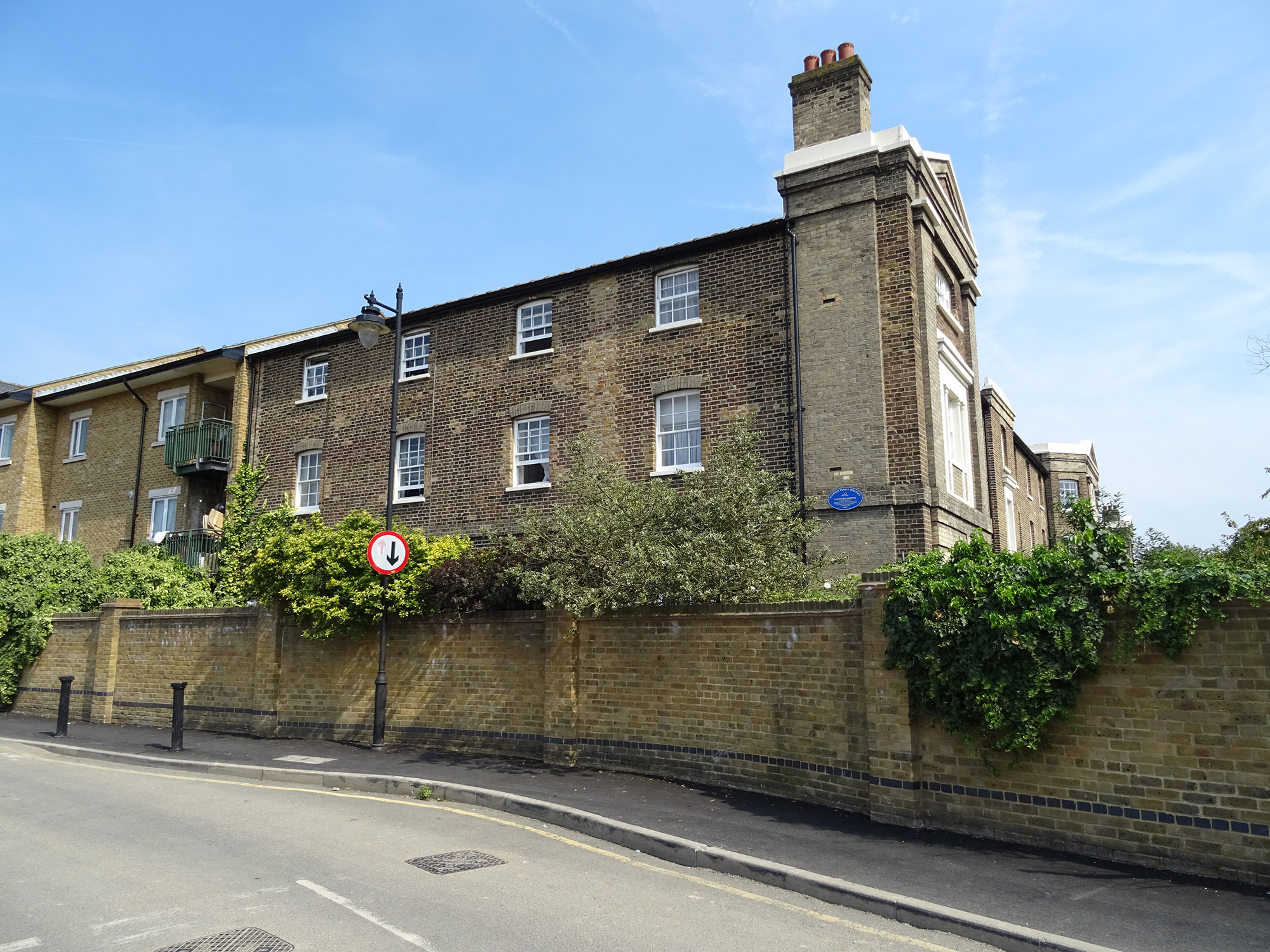
West Ham Union Workhouse buildings in 2017

West Ham Union Workhouse was a workhouse in Leytonstone, built in the village of Holloway Down between 1839 and 1841 and run by the West Ham Poor Law Union. That Union covered several parishes in what is now Newham, Redbridge and Waltham Forest. West Ham Borough Council took over its running in 1930 and renamed it the Central Home Public Assistance Institution (or Central Home for short), using it as a home for the infirm, aged and chronically sick. In 1948 it formally became a National Health Service hospital under the name of the Langthorne Hospital, which remained open until 1999.

The workhouse's main original block, its chapel and its lodge are all Grade II listed buildings, whilst the workhouse and hospital lands have been redeveloped.
