= Connaught School for Girls =

Location
- Dyers Hall Road; Leytonstone; London, E11 4AE; England; 51.56629°N 0.00461°E

Information
- Type: Academy
- Motto: Seize the day
- Established: 1932
- Department for Education URN: 139293 Tables
- Ofsted: Reports
- Head teacher: Linsey Hands
- Gender: Girls
- Age: 11 to 16
- Enrolment: 632
- Colours: Blue and gold
- Website: http://www.connaught-school.co.uk/

Connaught School for Girls is a single-sex girls' secondary school and comprehensive school situated in Leytonstone, London. It educates up to 636 girls between the ages of 11 and 16. In February 2013 it became an academy.

== History ==
The first school on the Connaught Road site was a temporary mixed school which opened in 1900 and was discontinued after four years. In 1904 the school became a high school for boys as part of the Norlington Road council school for boys, girls and infants. In 1932 the school reopened as Connaught Road senior girls' school with a junior mixed department. The reopened school was the only Leyton school to be built between the two world wars under the Leyton School Board 1929–32 reorganisation programme. The junior mixed department closed in 1948 when the school became a secondary (modern) school for girls, taking over its adjoining premises. In 1960–61 the school annexe was built on Madiera Road to accommodate the science and PE departments. In 1964 the main site was extended with a new dining room and main assembly hall. The school became a community secondary comprehensive school for girls in the 1970s. In February 2013 the school converted to become a state-funded independent academy for girls aged 11 to 16.

== Notable former pupils ==
- Dame Sharon White DBE, Chairman of the John Lewis Partnership from 2020
- Laviai Nielsen, British athlete known for 400m individual and relay sprinting
- Asha Philip, British athlete known for sprinting.
- June Sarpong, British television broadcaster
- Jo Fenn, British athlete and singer-songwriter
