= Bearmans =

Former department store in London

Coordinates: 51.5688°N 0.0112°E

Bearmans was a small department store located at 829 High Road, Leytonstone, London.

== History ==
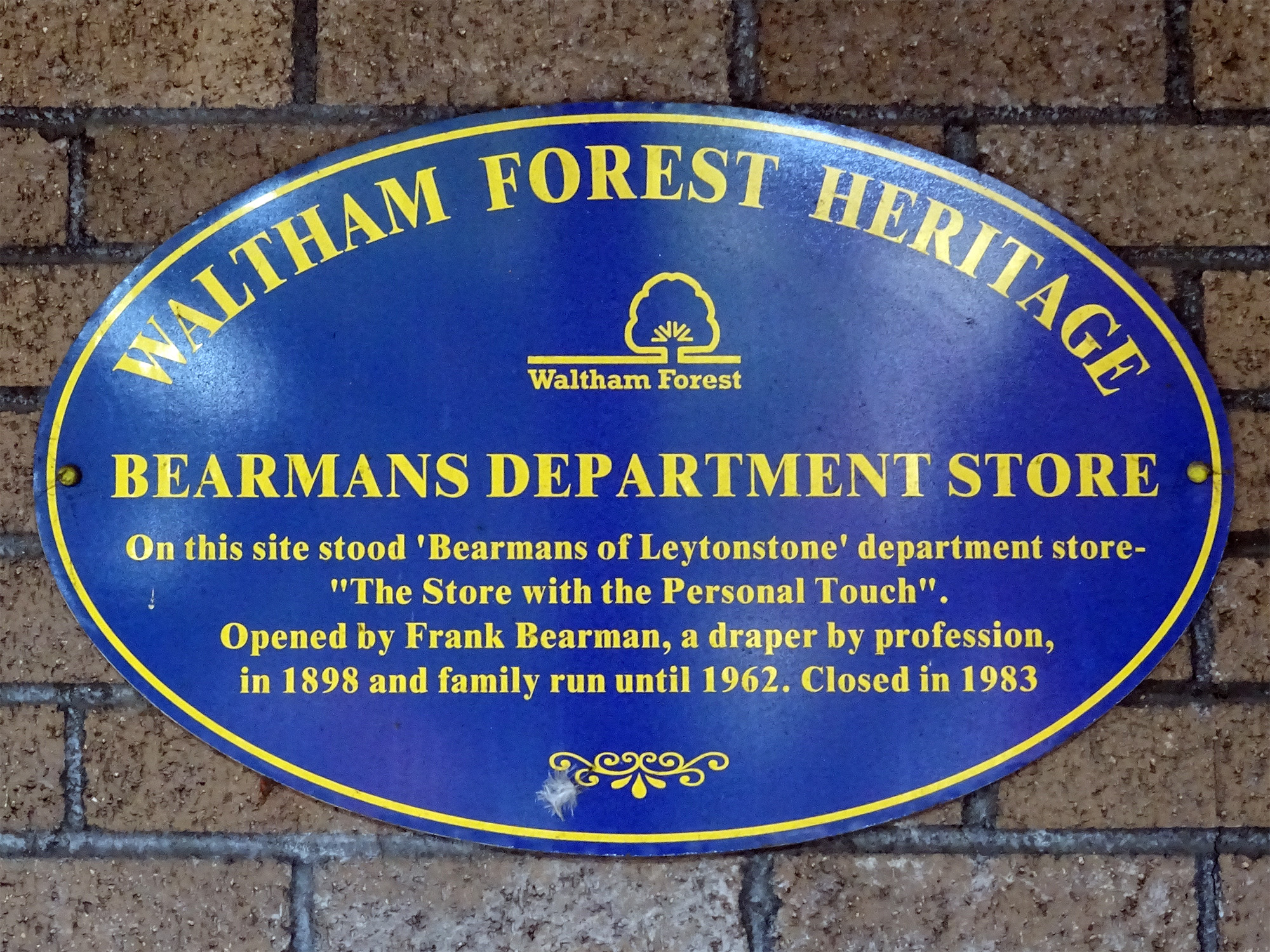
Blue plaque erected by Waltham Forest Council on 17 December 2012 at the site of Bearmans Department Store, 829-837 High Road, Leytonstone

In 1898, Frank Bearman, a 27-year-old draper, opened a shop on the north side of Leytonstone High Street on the site of a former vicarage. By 1906 the business had purchased a nearby furniture shop, and in 1910 opened an arcade to match the larger department stores in London. Between 1908 and 1921, Frank Bearman jointly owned, with J W Holdron, a store owner in Peckham, the Croydon department store Allders.

During the Second World War the store survived the Blitz, and in 1957 expanded again by building an extension in Kirkdale Road, which Bearmans claimed had the first escalators outside London.

In 1956 Frank Bearman died, and with increased competition in the area, in 1956 the Bearman store started Lord Brummell, a high-end bespoke line, to create more business. The company was sold to the London Co-operative Society for £1 million in 1962. The Co-operative continued to run the store until 1982 when they closed it. The building was demolished and replaced, the new building originally housing a Matalan between 2002 and early 2024, and then an Aldi from late 2024. The Leyton & Leytonstone Historical Society has placed a blue plaque on the outside of the new building as a memento.
