= Leytonstone =

Area of east London, England

Coordinates: 51.569°N 0.010°E

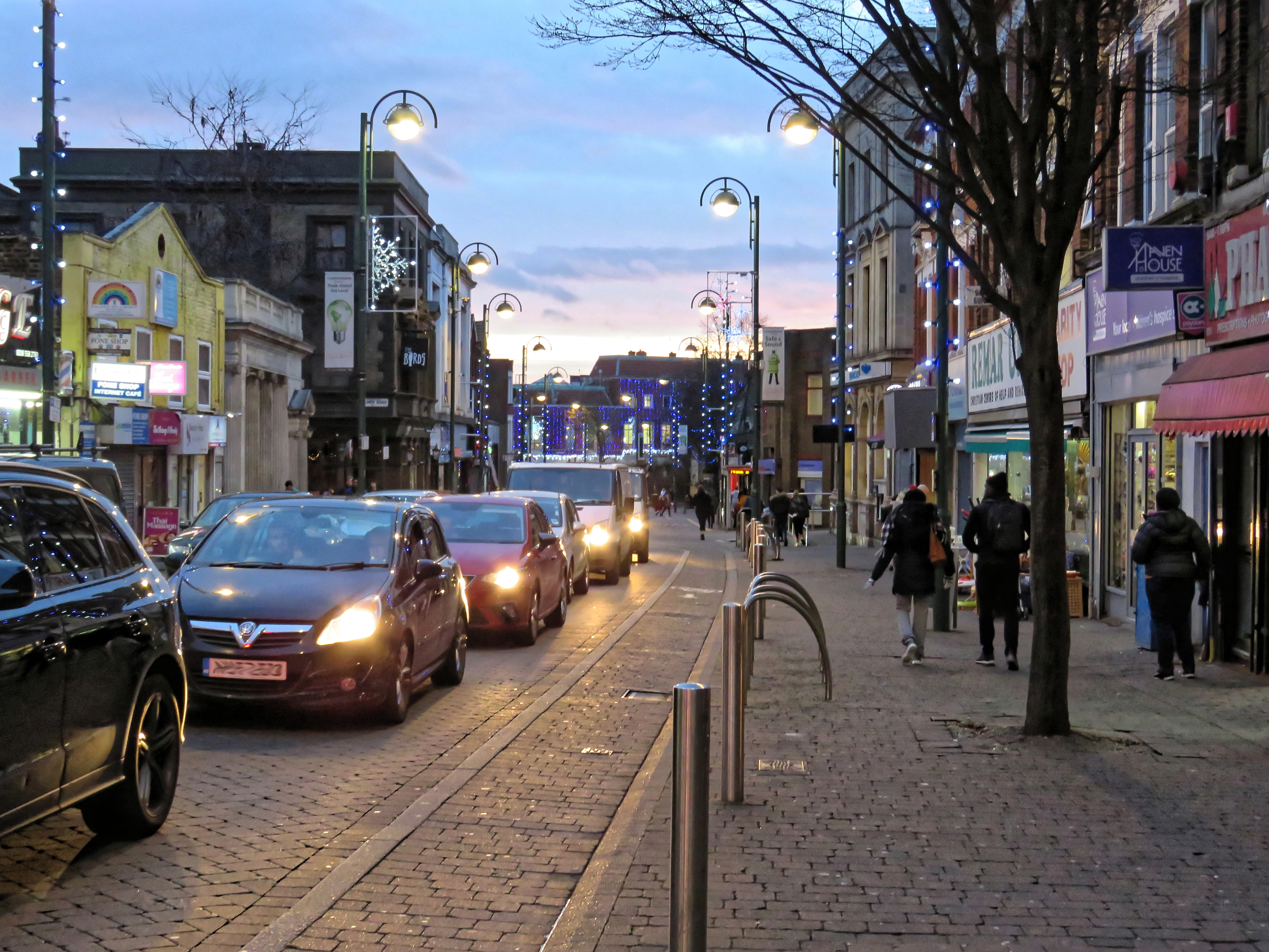
- Leytonstone High Road

- Location within Greater London
- Population: 54,696 (wards, 2011)
- OS grid reference: TQ3987
- London borough: Waltham Forest
- Ceremonial county: Greater London
- Region: London
- Country: England
- Sovereign state: United Kingdom
- Post town: LONDON
- Postcode district: E11, E15, E7
- Dialling code: 020
- Police: Metropolitan
- Fire: London
- Ambulance: London
- UK Parliament: Leyton and Wanstead
- London Assembly: North East

Leytonstone (/ˈleɪtənstoʊn/ LAY-tən-stohn) is an area in East London, England, within the London Borough of Waltham Forest. It adjoins Wanstead to the north-east, Forest Gate to the south-east, Stratford to the south-west, Leyton to the west, and Walthamstow to the north-west, and is 7 miles (11 km) north-east of Charing Cross.

Historically, it was part of the ancient parish of Leyton in the Becontree hundred of Essex. The first documented evidence of settlement is from the 14th century, describing a hamlet at 'Leyton-atte-stone'; a reference to the Roman milestone located within the area, that formed a northern boundary of the parish. It remained largely rural until the 19th century, becoming part of the London postal district in 1856, the same year its railway station was opened (now on the Central line). When Greater London was created in 1965, the Municipal Borough of Leyton merged with Chingford and Walthamstow to form the London Borough of Waltham Forest.

At the northern end of Leytonstone High Road is The Green Man, a public house, with an eponymous nearby gyratory road junction system under which the A12 runs. Leytonstone is noted for being the birthplace of Alfred Hitchcock, with a number of references to the filmmaker around the area, including painted murals, mosaics, and a hotel.

== History ==
=== Origins and Roman milestone ===
The main thoroughfare, Leytonstone High Road, is part of an ancient highway from Epping to London, on the borders of Epping Forest. A small hamlet at Leytonstone had existed since the early 14th century, when it formed part of the parish of Leyton St Mary. The name Leytonstone, originally "Leyton-atte-Stone", comes from nearby Leyton ("settlement (tun) on the River Lea") and the Roman milestone called the High Stone.

The stone and obelisk

The milestone still stands at the junction of Hollybush Hill (the A1199 road with Woodford) and New Wanstead (the A113 road with Woodford Bridge), near the eastern bounds of the parish. It is a restored 18th-century obelisk set up on an earlier stump, traditionally described as a Roman milestone, possibly marking an extension of the Roman road from Dunmow to Chigwell into London. Two of the obelisk inscriptions are still just legible, others not:

"To Epping XI Miles through Woodford, Loughton"
"To Ongar XV Miles through Woodford Bridge, Chigwell, Abridge"

Other Roman archaeological features have been found in nearby Leyton, including "a Roman cemetery south of Blind Lane, and massive foundations of some Roman building, with quantities of Roman brick... discovered in the grounds of Leyton Grange."

=== 18th and 19th century ===
In 1722, author Daniel Defoe travelled through "Layton-stone, a place by some known, now as much, by the sign of the Green-Man". Leytonstone, along with Stratford, Leyton and Woodford, was one of the villages Defoe called desirable country retreats for wealthy merchants and financiers within an easy ride of the City.

Leytonstone remained largely rural until the opening of the railway at Leytonstone station in 1856, which gave quick and easy access to Stratford and central London. This, with increased availability of office and industrial work, had transformed the area into a suburban dormitory town by the end of the 19th century.

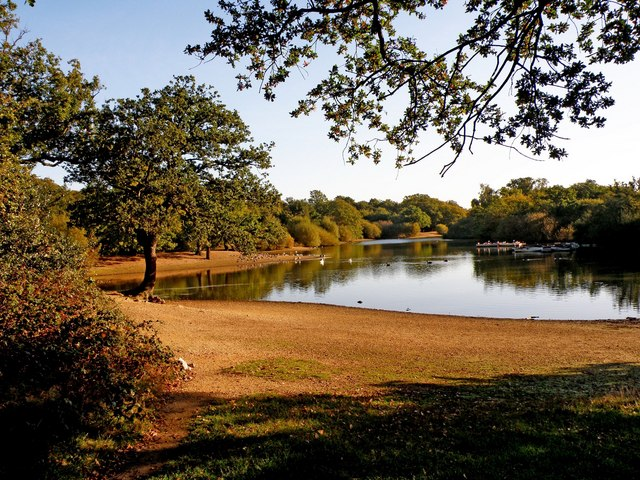
Hollow Pond in Epping Forest at Whipps Cross Road, Leytonstone

However, the forest land in the north and east of Leytonstone escaped development following a prolonged public campaign, when the Epping Forest Act 1878 preserved more than 200 acres (80 hectares) of open space for public use.

In 1898 the department store Bearmans, opened by Frank Bearman to sell furniture and clothing, was the first store outside central London with an escalator.

=== 20th century ===
In the mid-1990s, the M11 link road (A12) was built through the area, despite a long-running protest by locals and road protestors. This and other protests led to the policy, Roads for Prosperity, being abandoned. From 2001 to 2013, artists ran the 491 Gallery, a squatted social space in a building next the A12, which hosted events from exhibitions to gigs.

== Areas of Leytonstone ==
- Bushwood and Ferndale
- Browning Road Conservation Area
- Cann Hall
- Cathall
- Grove Green
- Harrow Green
- Upper Leytonstone
- Wanstead Flats
- Whipps Cross and Hollow Pond

Historic Areas

- Holloway Down

== Notable events ==
- M11 Link Road Protest between 1993 and 1995.
- The annual Leytonstone Festival was first held in 1995.
- Mosaics of Hitchcock Movies unveiled at Leytonstone tube station in May 2001.
- Leytonstone Arts Trail is an annual arts festival which started in 2008, where locals and artists display art in their windows and local venues.
- Leytonstone tube station attack in December 2015.
- The annual Leytonstone Loves Film with The Barbican was first held in 2019.

== Notable buildings and landmarks ==
- The Green Man roundabout and public house at the north edge of Leytonstone, with associated statue and mosaic; it remains a signposting-point on the A12.

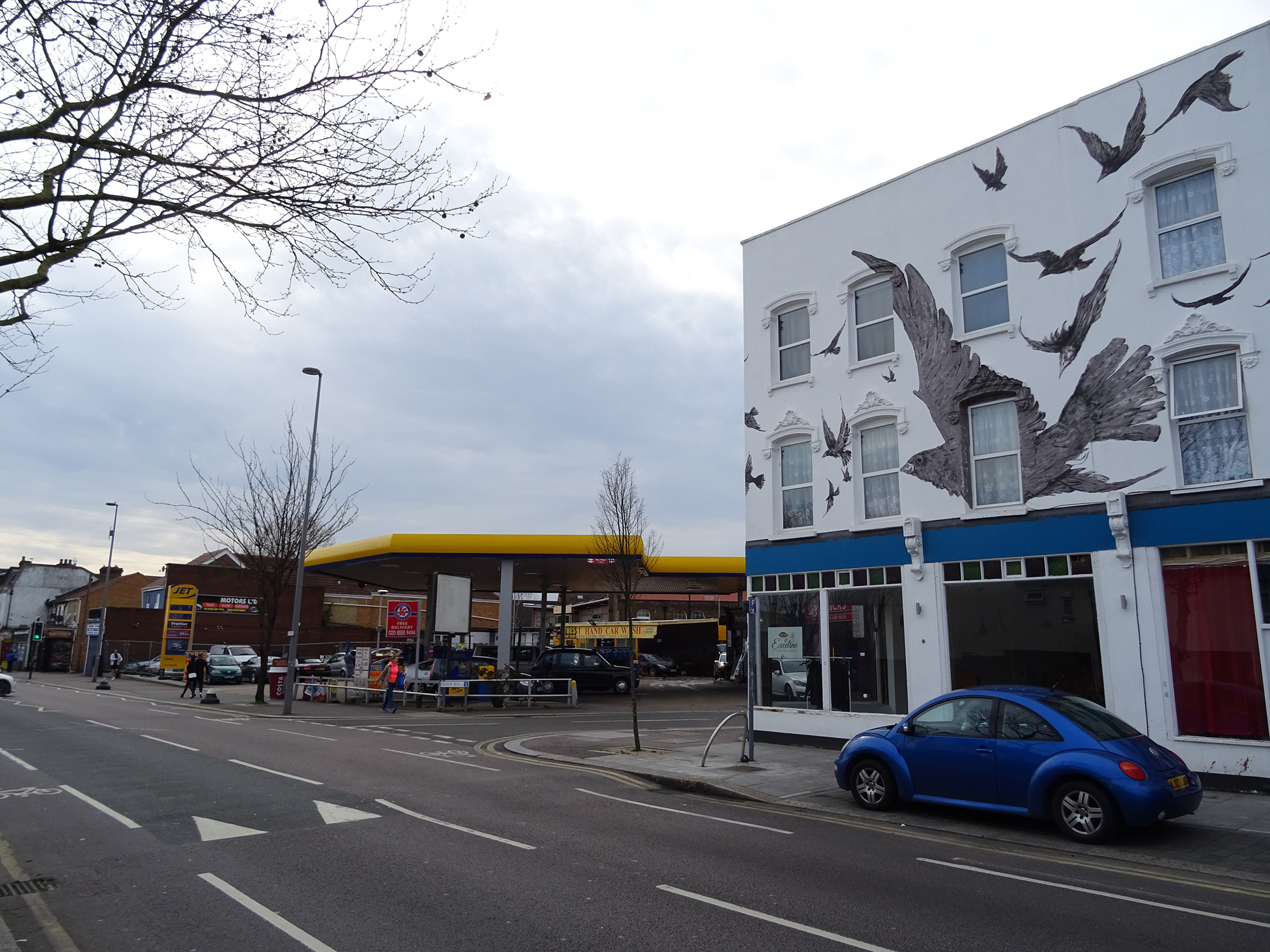
Site of 517 High Road Leytonstone, birthplace of Alfred Hitchcock

- Leytonstone is the birthplace of Alfred Hitchcock. The entrance to Leytonstone tube station has mosaics of scenes from his films. Next to his birth site at 517 Leytonstone High Road, the building has been painted with a mural of birds, repeated in the pavement outside. A pub at 692 Leytonstone High Road was renamed The Birds, in reference to his film The Birds, which was based on the novella by Daphne du Maurier.
- Leytonstone tube station, a post-war modernist building from 1947; designed by Thomas Bilbow, an architect for London Transport, as part of the Central line extension.
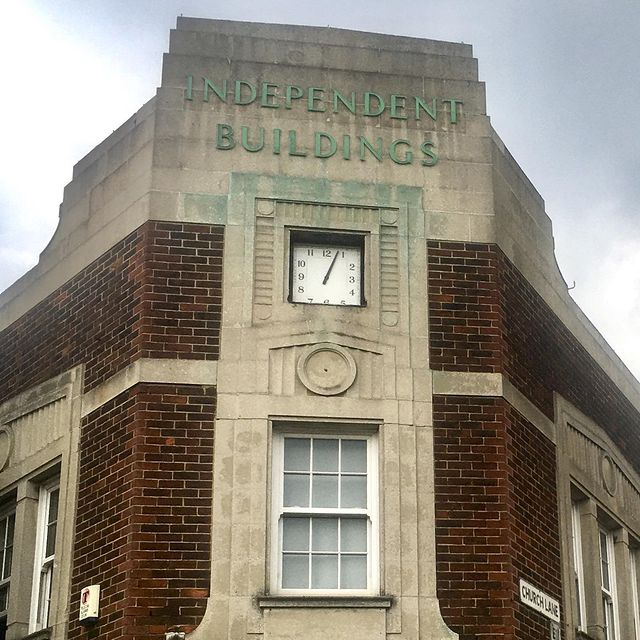
  Independent Buildings, Church Lane
- Independent Buildings on Church Lane, an art deco building and clock constructed by a local newspaper in 1934, replacing the Gaiety Cinema. The adjoining Seascape House is of matching architectural style.
- St John the Baptist's Church, Leytonstone is Grade II listed. Built in 1832 and consecrated in 1833, it is a landmark church at the junction of High Road Leytonstone and Church Lane. The churchyard is host to a vintage market and occasional screenings of Alfred Hitchcock films, as part of the annual Leytonstone Festival.Notable graves include those of the Buxton family and the Cotton family, local philanthropists.
- St Andrew's Church, Leytonstone, Grade II listed, was built in 1886–1893 as a memorial to the local philanthropist William Cotton and designed by Arthur Blomfield.
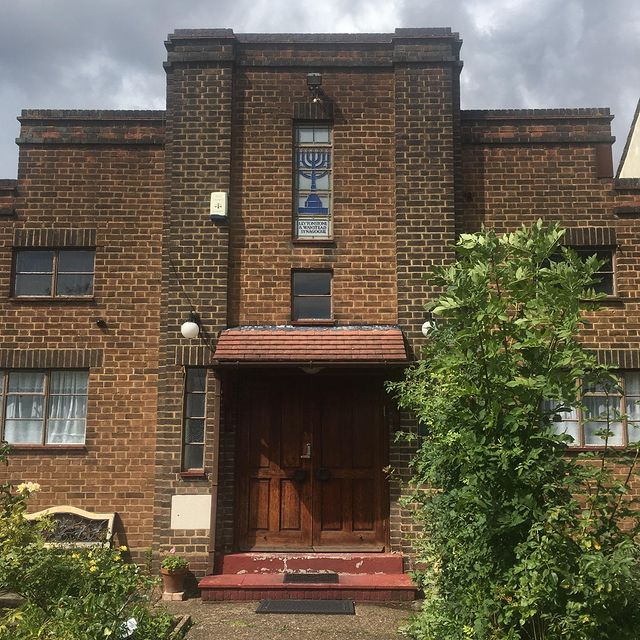
  Leytonstone and Wanstead Synagogue, Fillebrook Road
- Leytonstone and Wanstead Synagogue, a post-war building in the art deco style on the corner of Fillebrook Road and Drayton Road; built in 1954 by the local Jewish community.
- Leytonstone Mosque, a 1970s adaptation of an 1880s church hall that was originally part of St John's, provides worship for up to 1000 male Sunni Muslims and a range of religious education for young boys.

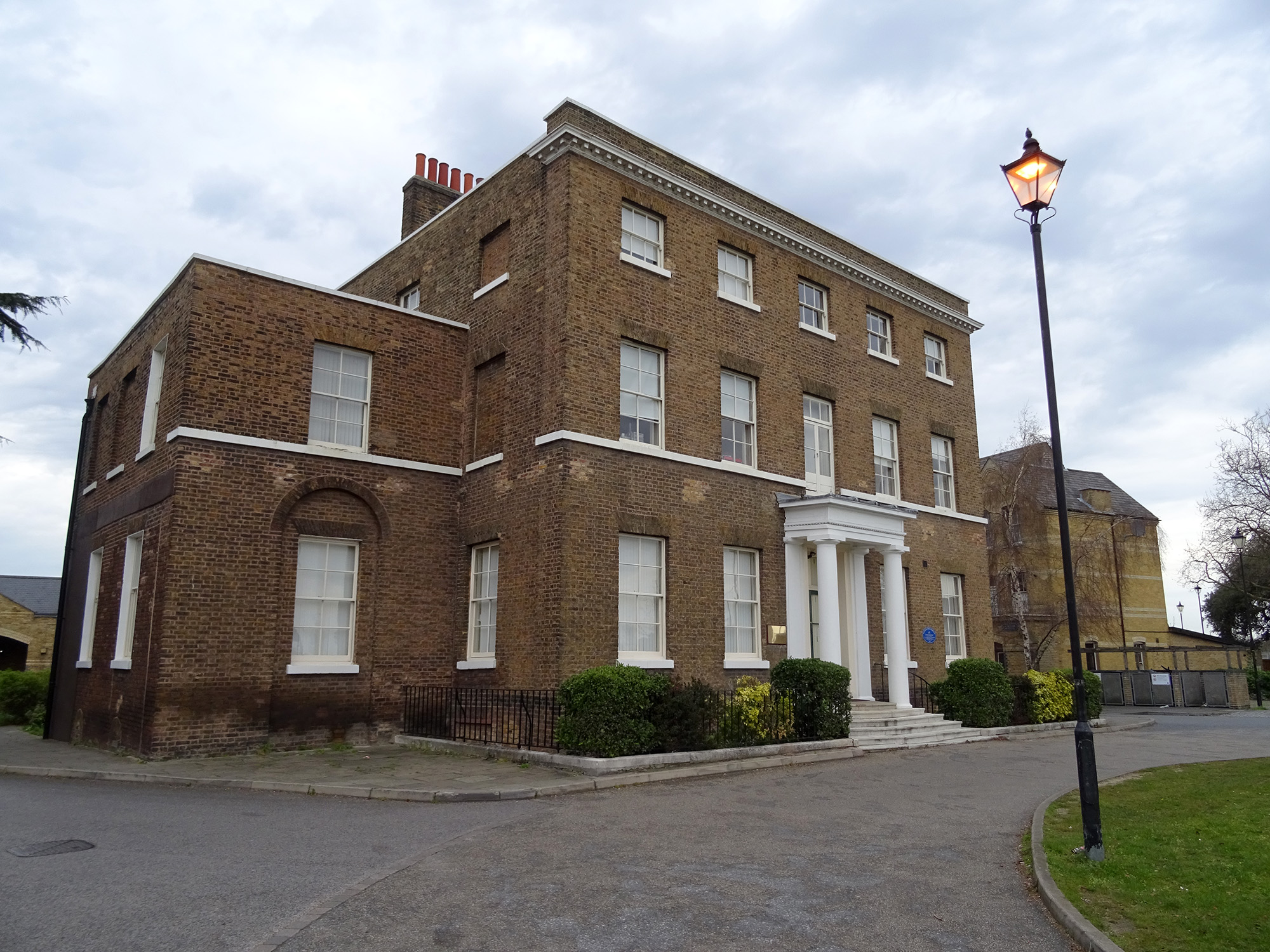
Leytonstone House

- Leytonstone House is an eighteenth century, Grade II-listed building immediately to the southwest of the Green Man Roundabout. It stands on a plot of land of approximately 3.5 hectares set back from the main road behind a long wall. A celebrated ancient black mulberry tree grows in the grounds, planted some time before 1840, which still bears fruit. The first known occupants of the house were Philip Sansom (1786- 1845), his wife Elizabeth, son Henry and daughter Elizabeth. Philip Sansom was a founding member of The Society for Effecting the Abolition of the Slave Trade (aka The Anti-Slavery Society) alongside William Wilberforce (1759–1833), Thomas Fowell Buxton (1786–1845) and others.

Between 1840 and 1867 Thomas Fowell Buxton's son, also called Thomas Fowell Buxton (1822–1908), lived in the house with his wife Rachel Jane Gurney Buxton and large family. An account of the day-to-day life of the family was written by their daughter Elizabeth Ellen Buxton (1848–1919) which includes many drawings of the house, garden, family and friends. It was also the home of the Liberal Party MP Edward North Buxton (1812–1858). His third son, also named Edward North Buxton, along with his brother Thomas, argued alongside the City of London Corporation for the preservation of nearby Epping Forest for public use, leading to the passing of the Epping Forest Act 1878. In 1867 the house was purchased by the Bethnal Green Board of Guardians to use as a workhouse school, named The Bethnal Green Schools for the Juvenile Poor, an industrial school and home for children under the age of fifteen. The original outbuildings of Leytonstone House were demolished, with the house itself retained as an administrative centre. Temporary iron school buildings were erected, which were all replaced by permanent blocks by 1889. The schools became the London County Council's in 1930, and operated until 1937 as the Leytonstone Children's Home, and then Leytonstone House Hospital until it closed in 1994. The site was subsequently redeveloped, and the house and half of the school blocks remain today as a mixture of commercial and residential use.

- Wallwood Farmhouse, near the Welsh Church on Leytonstone High Road, was built on the Wallwood Estate in the 1600s when the area was rural. it was owned in the early 19th Century by William Cotton, son of Joseph Cotton and father of Agnes Cotton, philanthropist.
- Leytonstone Library – a Grade II* listed art deco building built in 1934 to the design of James Ambrose Dartnall – underwent s £1.5 million refurbishment completed in 2015.

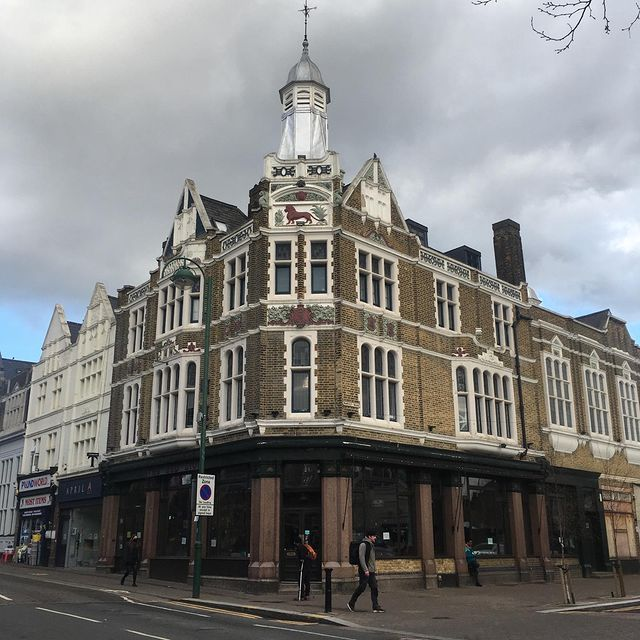
The Red Lion public house, restored in 2011

- Harrow Green Library, an art deco building opened in 1939 and closed in 2011 due to funding cuts; now run as a volunteer library in the same building, renamed The Junction.
- Leytonstone War Memorial and Gardens revealed in 1925 in remembrance of people of Leyton and Leytonstone who fought in The Great War and World War II; sited in the middle of Harrow Green, which is also the site of the modernist-style Wesleyan Christian Centre, built in 1959.
- The Red Lion, which has had a public house on the site since 1670. The current building is from 1891, having been restored as craft beer pub, ballroom and hotel; currently owned by the pub group Antic London.
- Whipps Cross University Hospital is set for redevelopment to include a brand-new hospital, along with new homes and other communal facilities. It was selected as one of six UK hospitals to receive a share of £2.7 billion of initial government funding in 2019.
- Whipps Cross Lido was a swimming pool dug in 1905, updated to a chlorinated facility in 1937 and closed in 1982. Some remains of the building and access road can be found near Hollow Pond on Leyton Flats.
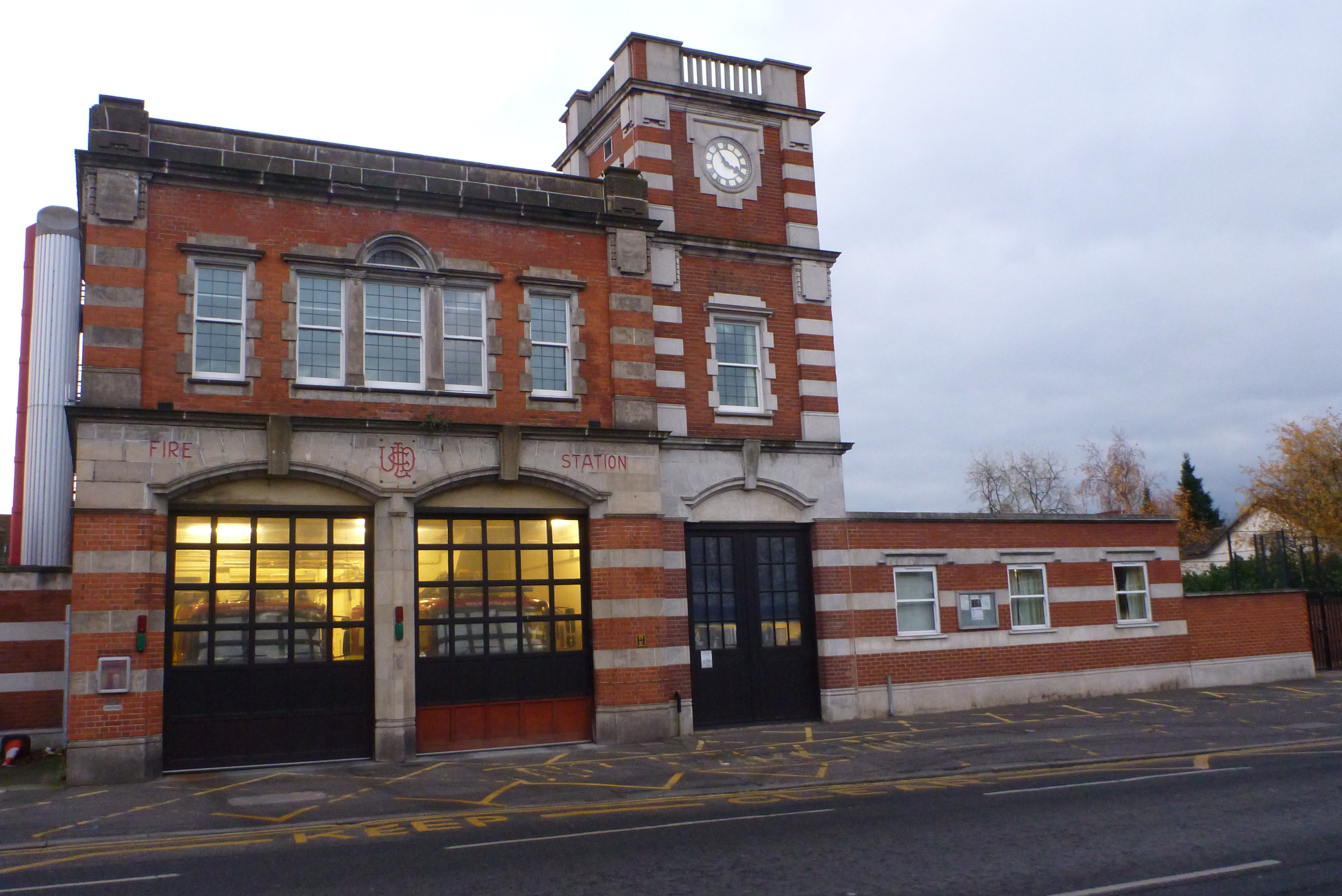
  The original Leytonstone Fire Station
- Leytonstone Fire Station, in Leytonstone High Road, was a Victorian building that was replaced in February 2016 by the current building.
- Pastures and Good Shepherd Building in Davies Lane are, respectively, the location of a 17th-century house, the home of Agnes Cotton, and a Children's Home founded by her. Both were threatened with redevelopment but saved by community protest in April 2021. The Pastures is now a Youth Centre and Sports Hall, while the Good Shepherd building is run as artists studios and a community creative space.
- West Ham Union Workhouse, whose buildings still remain in south Leytonstone, was originally part of the village of Holloway Down, located between Harrow Green and the Thatched House junction.
- Epping Forest reaches Leytonstone in heath areas called Hollow Pond and Leyton Flats, and Wanstead Flats.

== Governance ==
Leytonstone belonged originally to the ancient parish of Leyton in the Becontree Hundred of Essex. It became a separate ecclesiastical parish in 1845. The parish of Leyton formed part of the West Ham Poor law union. In 1894 it became part of Leyton Urban District, which was incorporated in 1926 as the Municipal Borough of Leyton.

Leytonstone became part of the London Borough of Waltham Forest in 1965 when Greater London was created. Within the borough, it divides into four council wards, each with three councillors: Forest ward (Whipps Cross area, parts of Upper Leytonstone as far as Grove Green), Leytonstone ward (the rest of Upper Leytonstone, the town centre, Bushwood and Ferndale areas), Cathall ward and Cann Hall ward (South Leytonstone areas).

The area forms part of the Leyton and Wanstead parliamentary constituency. As of July 2024, Calvin Bailey has held the seat for the Labour Party. For elections to the London Assembly it is part of the North East constituency and the AM is Sem Moema of the Labour Party, who succeeded Jenette Arnold in 2021.

Population Estimates 2019
Ward	Population	% Change 2001–19
Cann Hall	14,427	+27%
Cathall	13,112	+24%
Forest	13,196	+27%
Leytonstone	13,961	+31%
Total	54,696	+27%

== Transport ==
Leytonstone tube station is in London fare zones 3 and 4 on the Central line of the London Underground, and serves as the last stop before the line splits into the Fairlop Loop and the branch to Epping (Zone 6). Since 2016, night tube trains run on Friday and Saturdays on the Central line every 10 minutes between White City and Loughton (in Essex) or Hainault via Leytonstone. A series of tiled mosaics commemorating the local film director Alfred Hitchcock line the entrance passages to the station.

Leytonstone Bus Station stands either side of exits for Leytonstone tube station; key routes include the 257 to Stratford, the W15 to Hackney, and the night bus N8 to Tottenham Court Road.

Leytonstone High Road railway station is a London Overground railway station, located in the south of Leytonstone, serving the Gospel Oak to Barking line. In 2018, the line was electrified to allow for longer trains, with an additional capacity; after engineering and supply delays, these were introduced in June 2019.

Close to the southern end of Leytonstone (3/4 mile or 1.2 kilometres south of the Cann Hall Road boundary) is Maryland railway station in Stratford; which is on the Elizabeth line.

From 25 October 2021, Leytonstone will be in London's Ultra Low Emission Zone (ULEZ); which is to be expanding from central London up to the North Circular and South Circular roads.

== Education ==
Leytonstone schools include:

- Buxton School, an all-through school for ages 3–16 and Specialist Science College
- Connaught School for Girls, a specialist language school
- Davies Lane Primary School, first opened in 1901 as a board school. In 1948 it became a junior and infants school, merging into a single primary in 2004.
- George Tomlinson Primary School
- Gwyn Jones Primary School
- Leytonstone School, a specialist business and enterprise school
- Mayville Nursery and Primary School, from 2-10yo
- Norlington School, a boys' school and mixed sixth form

== Sports and fitness ==
Leytonstone Leisure Centre on Cathall Road provides a gym and 25-metre main pool, sports hall, fitness studios, and a children's soft-play area.

Wanstead Flats has 60 football pitches, including eight full size pitches. This facility is overseen by City of London Corporation and amateur football teams play every Sunday. 5K Parkruns take place in Wanstead Flats at 9am every Saturday morning, starting and finishing at Harrow Road Pavilion.

The North Star on Browning Road is home to the North Star Velo cycling club.

The association football team Wanderers F.C. was founded in Leytonstone in 1859 as Forest Football Club, playing their home matches on Leyton Flats until 1865, instead playing at various locations in London and the surrounding area. The team was a founding member of The Football Association in 1863 and would rename in 1864 and would win the inaugural Football Association Challenge Cup in 1872, winning five out of the first seven finals and won three in succession from 1876 to 1878, a feat which has been repeated only once. Despite dissolving in 1887, Wanderers are still tied with Everton and West Bromwich Albion with the sixth most FA Cups as of 2025.

Leytonstone was also home to Leytonstone F.C. before it merged with Redbridge Forest F.C. and then Dagenham & Redbridge football club.

== In drama, film and television ==
- In The Bed-Sitting Room (1969), Spike Milligan created the (fictional) closest heir to the British throne after the outbreak of nuclear war as "Mrs. Ethel Shroake" of 393A High Street, Leytonstone. She appears in the final scene of the play.
- Deep End, a 1970 British-German drama starring Jane Asher with a soundtrack by Can, was partly shot on Cann Hall Road and Cathall Road Baths (built 1906, rebuilt later in 1977).
- Small Potatoes was a 1999 TV sitcom made by Hat Trick Productions for Channel 4, about the young manager of a video shop in Leytonstone.
- I Proud to Be an Indian was a 2004 Bollywood film, about an Indian family in late 1970s Leytonstone terrorised by skinheads.
- In EastEnders, the fictional character Kim Fox is from Leytonstone.
- In Vicious, a sitcom series that ran from 2013 to 2016, the fictional character Stuart Bixby, played by Derek Jacobi, was from Leytonstone (like Jacobi in real life).

== Notable people ==
- Damon Albarn (born 1968), singer-songwriter raised in Fillebrook Road, lead singer of Blur.
- Eric Ashby, Baron Ashby (1904–1992), botanist, was born in Leytonstone.
- Roger Ashton-Griffiths (born 1957), actor
- David Bailey (born 1939), photographer, was born in Leytonstone.
- Reginald Poynton Baker (1896–1985), film producer, father of the Conservative MP Peter Baker
- Ashley Banjo (born 1988), dancer and choreographer, was born in Leytonstone.
- David Beckham (born 1975), former footballer (England, Manchester United, Real Madrid, LA Galaxy, AC Milan, Paris Saint-Germain), was born in Leytonstone and grew up in Chingford.
- James Bevan (1858–1938), captain of the Welsh rugby union team in its first international match, died in Leytonstone
- Reginald Horace Blyth (1898–1964), author and orientalist
- Alan Booth (1946–1993), travel writer
- Patrick Brill (born 1963) artist, writer and musician; known by the pseudonym Bob and Roberta Smith
- Edward North Buxton (1840–1924), conservationist and liberal politician
- Cornelius Cardew (1936–1981), composer
- Carly Cole (born 1984), model, fitness trainer and wife of footballer Joe Cole
- Agnes Cotton (1828-1899),philanthropist, founded the ‘Good Shepherd Home’ for girls in Davies Lane.
- Fanny Cradock (1909–1994), TV chef and cookery writer born in Fairlop Road, Leytonstone
- Curtis Davies (born 1985), footballer
- Cartrain (born 1991), artist
- Harris Dickinson (born 1996), actor
- Frank Dobson (1886–1963), sculptor, lived in Cobden Road as a teenager in 1901
- John Drinkwater (1882–1937), poet and dramatist, born in Leytonstone in 1882
- Charles Eade (1903–1964), journalist, born in Leytonstone
- Eamon Everall (born 1948), artist and educator
- Georgie Farmer (born 2002), actor
- Ken Farnes (1911–1941), cricketer
- Henry Charles Fehr (1867–1940), sculptor, lived and worked in Leytonstone in 1886–1891.
- Joanne Fenn (born 1974), Olympic runner
- Stuart Freeborn (1914–2013), Star Wars make-up artist who was most famous as the designer of Yoda; born in Grove Green Road, had a Blue Heritage Plaque placed on his former home in December 2015.
- Graham Gooch (born 1953), cricketer, former captain of the England cricket team
- Jimmy Hallybone (born 1962), former professional footballer
- Steve Harris (born 1956), founder and bassist of the band Iron Maiden
- Alfred Hitchcock (1899–1980), film director born and raised in the area.
- Tom Hood (1835–1874), humorist and playwright
- Sydney Horler (1888–1964), novelist
- Gavin Hoyte (born 1990), footballer
- Justin Hoyte (born 1984), footballer
- Derek Jacobi (born 1938), actor
- Jammer (born 1982), record producer
- Harry Kane (born 1993), footballer (England, Tottenham Hotspur and Bayern Munich), was born in Leytonstone and grew up in Chingford.
- Colin Kazim-Richards (born 1986), footballer
- Lucy Kirkwood (born 1983), playwright and screenwriter
- Don Law (1902–1982), record producer
- Natasha Little (born 1969), actor
- Seán Mac Stíofáin (1928–2001), chief-of-staff of the Provisional IRA
- Morell Mackenzie (1837–1892), research physician
- Colin Matthews (born 1946), composer
- Dominic McVey (born 1985), Britain's youngest self-made millionaire
- Jozef Piłsudski (1867–1935), Polish statesman, stayed with the Wasilewski family while on the run from Russia in the 1900s
- Jamie Porter (born 1993), cricketer
- Redzz (born 1987), rapper, actor, songwriter and musician
- Tony Robinson (born 1946), comedian and broadcaster
- Jonathan Ross (born 1960), broadcaster and comedian. Went to Davies Lane primary school.
- Paul Ross (born 1956), broadcaster
- Philip Samson (died 1815), prominent abolitionist, made Leytonstone House his home from 1795 until his death. A wealthy London merchant and banker, he was one of the 12 founding members of the Society for Effecting the Abolition of the Slave Trade
- June Sarpong (born 1977), television presenter
- Rita Simons (born 1977), actress, singer and model
- Talvin Singh (born 1970), composer and musician
- Adam Smith (born 1991), footballer
- Beth Shriever (born 1999), BMX racer and Olympic Gold Medalist
- Harold Spurr (1889–1962), English cricketer
- Andros Townsend (born 1991), footballer
- Halszka Wasilewska (1899–1961), soldier, daughter of Leon Wasilewski, spent her infancy here before becoming a decorated major in the Polish Armed Forces
- Leon Wasilewski (1870–1936), Polish political activist and editor lived in Leytonstone in 1898–1903
- Douglas Webb (1922–1996), dam buster and photographer
- Horace Waller (1833–1896), missionary, anti-slavery activist and campaigner
