= Holloway Down =

Coordinates: 51°33′16″N 0°00′17″E

Holloway Down was a village, historically in Essex and now part of Leytonstone in the London Borough of Waltham Forest. The village was sited at the junction of Union Lane (now Thorne Close) and Leytonstone Road (now High Road, Leytonstone) It is most notable as the location of the West Ham Union Workhouse, While the village has been replaced by Victorian terraces and shops, buildings from the workhouse remain; which have been converted into housing and part of North East London NHS Foundation Trust.

Holloway Down and the workhouses were built on land that was originally part of Stratford Langthorne Abbey estate. The name comes from the Prioress of Holywell, who was granted the land, then called Ladune in 1201. By the 15th century the area was called Holywell Down.

In 1791, Holloway Down was the location for The Old Thatched House public house before being relocated to a new building in 1875, as The Thatched House Inn; 100 yards south at the junction with Cutthroat Lane (now Crownfield Road) and Cannhall Lane (now Cann Hall Road).
