= June Sarpong =

British television presenter (born 1977)

The Right Honourable The Baroness Sarpong OBE
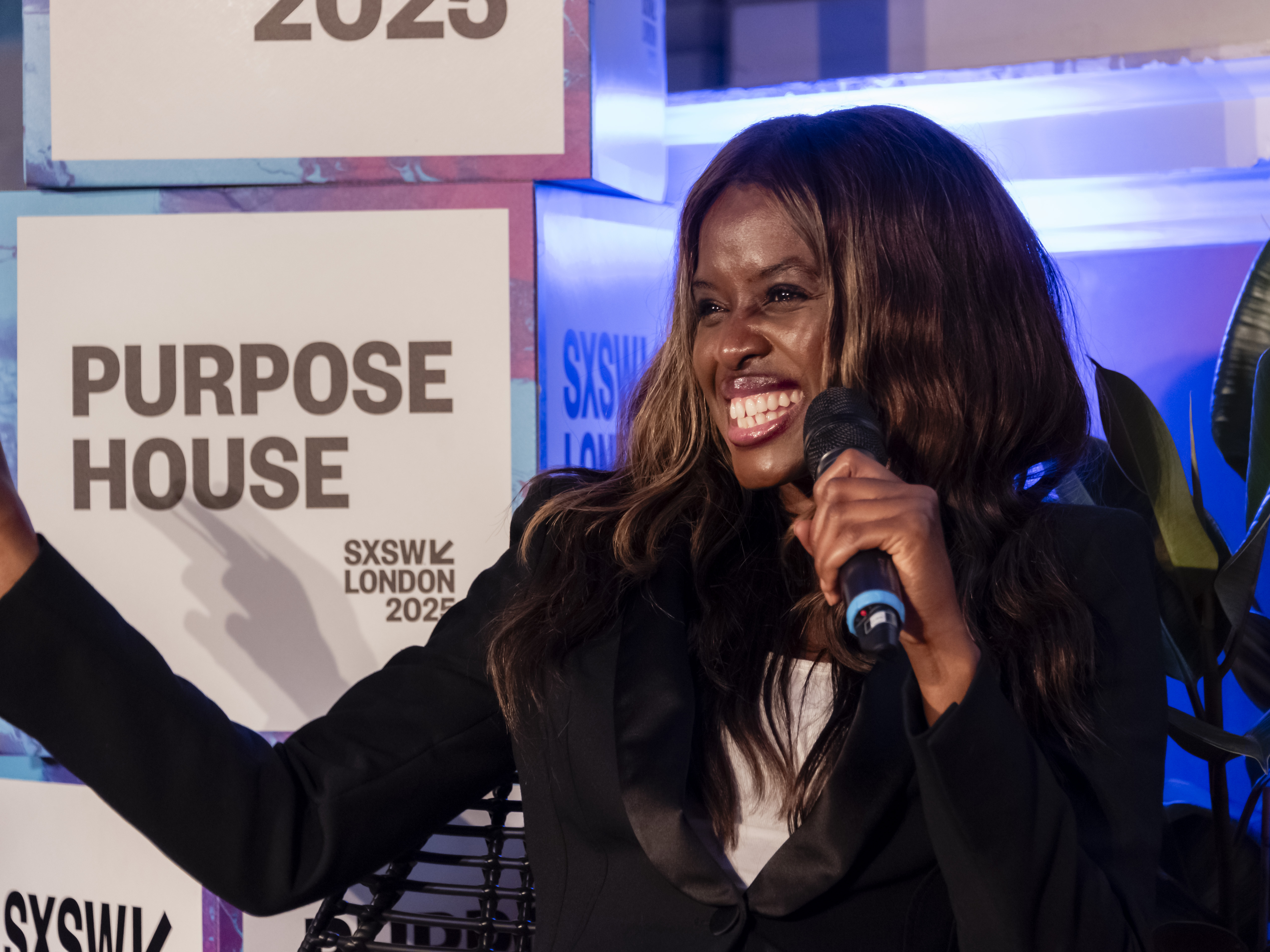
- Sarpong at the SXSW London festival in 2025
- Born: June Abena Konadu Sarpong; 31 May 1977 (age 49); Newham, London, England
- Education: Connaught School for Girls; Sir George Monoux College
- Occupation: Television presenter
- Years active: 1996–present
- Relatives: Sam Sarpong (brother)

Member of the House of Lords
- Lord Temporal
- Life peerage 21 August 2026

Personal details
- Party: Labour

June Abena Konadu Sarpong, Baroness Sarpong OBE (born 31 May 1977) is a British television presenter and executive. She was a panellist on ITV's Loose Women and is a panellist on the Sky News programme The Pledge. In November 2019, Sarpong was appointed as the BBC's first Director of Creative Diversity.

== Early life and education ==
Sarpong was born in Newham, London, to Ghanaian parents Thelma (née Amihere) and Samuel Sarpong. She was educated at Connaught School for Girls in Leytonstone and Sir George Monoux College in Walthamstow.

== Career ==
She began her media career as a DJ and presenter with the radio station Kiss 100 around 1997 and later became an MTV UK and Ireland presenter (MTV Dance Floor Chart). In 2001, she appeared on Lily Savage's Blankety Blank (ITV). As one of the female faces of Channel 4’s daytime teen-aimed strand T4 for nine years, she interviewed Tony Blair for a T4 special, When Tony Met June, which aired in January 2005. She runs her own production company, Lipgloss Productions. Projects in development include a sitcom and a programme on climate change.

In recent years, Sarpong has presented other series, including Your Face or Mine?, a game show co-hosted with Jimmy Carr for E4; Dirty Laundry, an urban talk-show that was an original idea of Sarpong's; Playing It Straight, a dating game-show filmed in Mexico for Channel 4, and Sarpong has presented the Smash Hits Poll Winners Party and the Party In The Park. She is a regular at the MOBO Awards and presented them for three years in a row. She has also appeared on BBC Television's Question Time, Channel 4's 8 Out of 10 Cats, and BBC's Have I Got News for You. She also has appeared on the programme Never Mind the Buzzcocks and introduced reports on youth culture for This Week. In 2006 she hosted ITV2's WAGs Boutique. Sarpong has also appeared on the third series of Bo' Selecta!.

Sarpong appeared in the Extras Special Series Finale with Ricky Gervais (2007). On 22 October 2007 it was announced that she had quit her presenter role on T4 after nine years. Her last show was broadcast on 23 December 2007.

Sarpong made a guest appearance in Little Miss Jocelyn series 2, episode 3 (2008). On 6 November 2009 she hosted the Sky1 programme Michael Jackson: The Search for...His Spirit, in which she went around locations pertinent to Jackson's life looking for signs of his ghost. The programme was broadcast as part of a double bill, the second part comprising a live séance conducted by Derek Acorah, for which Sarpong again played host.

Sarpong worked as an interviewer on Jesse Ventura's Conspiracy Theory show broadcast on TruTV. On the first episode she made the claim that the 2004 tsunami was not preceded by "pretremors or any warning". Journalist Peter Hadfield criticized this claim as being unsupported by seismological records and scientific papers.

In late 2013, Elton John performed a variation of his 1970 hit "Your Song" with the amended lyrics "You can tell everybody 'You're June Sarpong'" as an apparent reference to an in-joke between the pair from a charity event earlier that year.

After the "#WheresJuneSarpongGone" campaign begun by Celebrity Juice on 19 March 2015, Loose Women welcomed her to the panel as a guest panellist on 23 March. Following her first appearance back on screen, Sarpong appeared on Celebrity Juice, in Fearne Cotton's team, on 2 April.

After appearing alongside Ruth Langsford, Coleen Nolan and Janet Street-Porter on 23 March 2015, as a guest panellist, Sarpong later appeared a further three times as a guest panellist: on 16 April, 17 April and 1 May. Since appearing on the programme again on 15 May, she became a regular panellist, initially as cover for Sherrie Hewson, while Hewson was filming Benidorm, later on 21 July 2015, Sarpong became a regular. She left the show in December 2016 and made 46 appearances in total.

On 7 January 2016, Sarpong made an emotional speech live on Loose Women, following the death of her brother. The first part of the show was dedicated to him. A picture of a rainbow was re-tweeted more than 5,000 times throughout the course of the show, in his memory. She has been a panellist on two series of Debatable on BBC Two.

Since April 2016, Sarpong has made regular appearances on Sky News The Pledge.

She is the author of the books Diversify: Six Degrees of integration (2017), The Power of Women (2018), and The Power of Privilege: How white people can challenge racism (2020).

On 9 and 10 June, 2026, she moderated the 5th osapiens Sustainability summit (SoS.26) in Mannheim, Germany.

== Advocacy ==
In August 2014, Sarpong was one of 200 public figures who were signatories to a letter to The Guardian expressing their hope that Scotland would vote to remain part of the United Kingdom in the run-up to September's referendum on that issue. In October 2015, she joined the board of the Britain Stronger in Europe campaign, lobbying for the United Kingdom to remain in the European Union.

== Personal life ==
Her older brother was Sam Sarpong, an actor and host of MTV's Yo Momma. He died on 26 October 2015 at the age of 40 after jumping off a bridge in Pasadena, California.

== Honours ==
Sarpong was appointed Member of the Order of the British Empire (MBE) in the 2007 New Year Honours for services to broadcasting and to charity and Officer of the Order of the British Empire (OBE) in the 2020 New Year Honours for services to broadcasting. In the July 2026 political peerages, Sarpong was nominated for a peerage by the then Prime Minister, Keir Starmer, in recognition of her contributions to broadcasting, charity campaigning, and social equity; she was created Baroness Sarpong, of Walthamstow in the London Borough of Waltham Forest on 21 August 2026.
