= Bushwood, Leytonstone =

Coordinates: 51.5679°N 0.0147°E

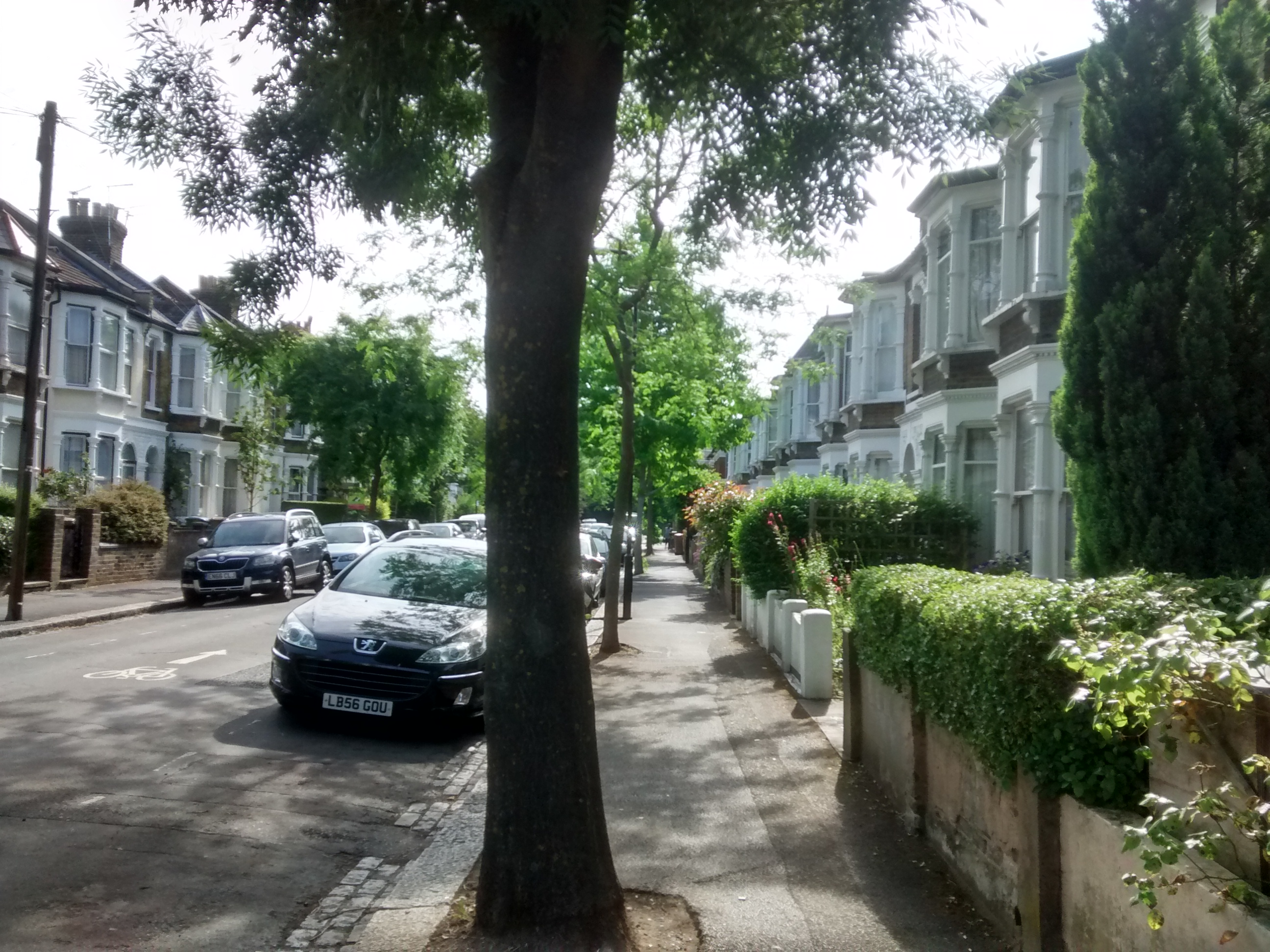
A tree-lined road in the Bushwood area of Leytonstone

Bushwood is an area in the north of Leytonstone in East London; determined by the curved boundary of the road called Bushwood along the edge of Wanstead Flats, Lister Road to the south and High Road, Leytonstone to the west. The area has the Browning Road Conservation Area, that contains what remains of the historic hamlet of Leyton-atte-stone.

The area has many tree-lined streets with Victorian and Edwardian houses, which continue to attract professionals and young families. The area is popular for its proximity to Wanstead Flats and Wanstead Park, quick access to restaurants, cafés and shops, and transport links into central London via the Central Line. Bushwood, a neighborhood with around 1,500 homes, is known for its exceptionally active and strong residents' association. This group fosters community spirit through events and innovative and creative initiatives, and also publishes a quarterly magazine called The Bush Telegraph. More information about their activities can be found on their website: www.bara.london.

== History ==
It is named after the ancient woodland of Bush Wood, which creates part of the north-east border of the area.

== Notable features ==
=== Browning Road Conservation Area ===
Bushwood includes The Browning Road Conservation Area consists of terraces of 'Georgian' cottages. These were preserved as a reminder of their special historic and architectural interest by Waltham Forest Council in March 1973.

==== The North Star ====
The North Star Public House is situated on Browning Road in the heart of the Conservation Area. Originally two cottages converted into a Public House it is thought that the name of this establishment comes as a direct result of a sailing voyage taken by the founder of the North Star, Frederick Wildsmith which involved his returning from India with a monkey and so fond was he of this memory, he decided to name the pub after the twin-masted, 253 ton Brigantine in which he had travelled. The North Star's first mention is in the 1858 Rate book with Frederick listed as a 'beer retailer' in the 1891 census.

=== Victorian keystones ===
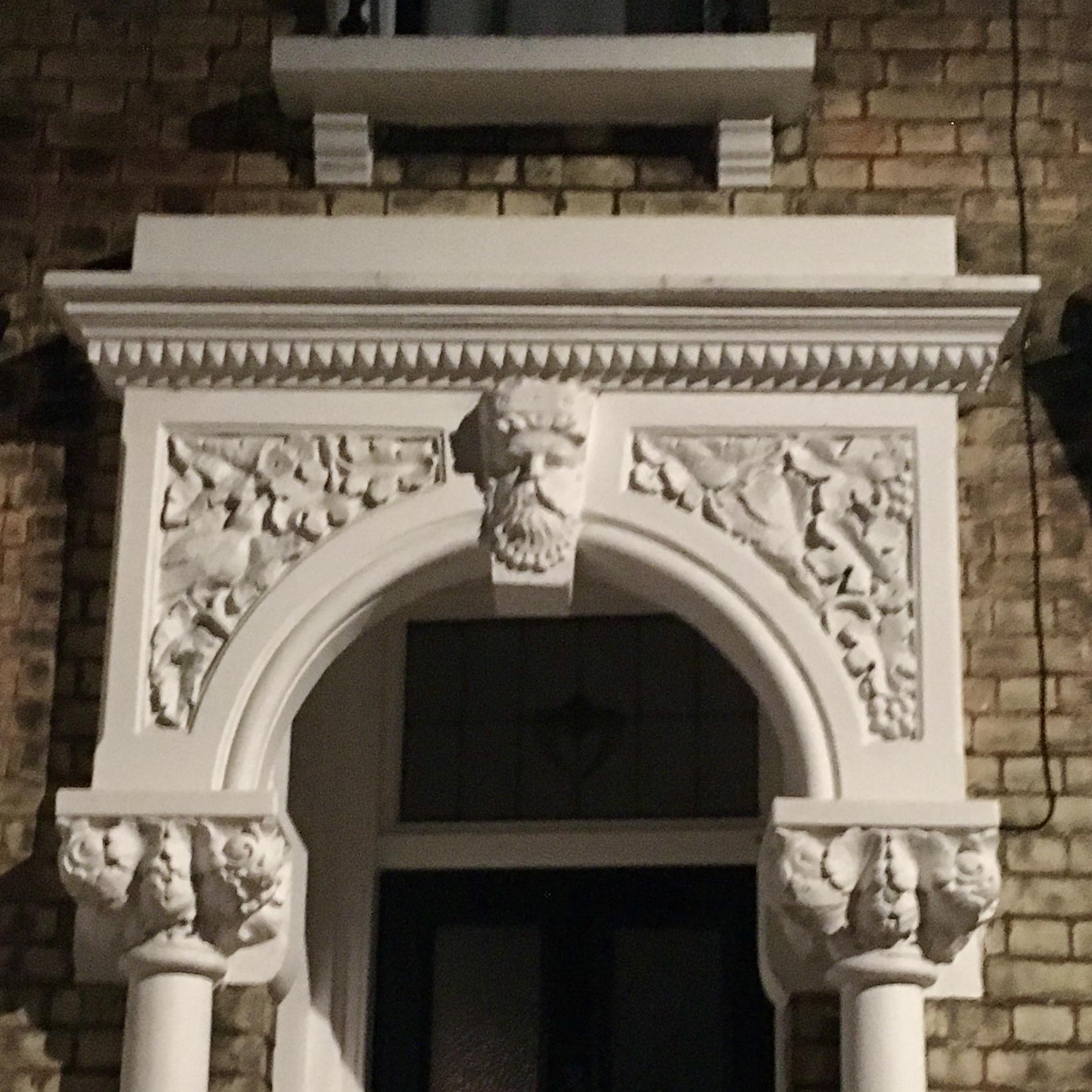
Victorian keystone in Bushwood, Leytonstone

Many Victorian houses in Bushwood have decorative keystones above their entrances in the form of faces. Mainly found in Leyspring, Leybourne, Barclay and Woodville Roads, the use of these elements was influenced by the Neoclassical architecture introduced by Romanticism in the early Victorian period (mid 1800s).

=== Henry Reynolds Park ===
At the northernmost part of Bushwood, is Henry Reynolds Park which includes a playground for children of all ages and basketball shooting practice area. Originally a gravel pit that became Green Man Pond; it was drained in the 1970s to form the present day park with its sunken gardens.

=== Leytonstone Mosque ===
Bushwood is the location of Leytonstone Mosque.

=== Ferndale area ===
Ferndale is an area of streets that adjoins the south of Bushwood; covering Davies Lane, Cotton Close, Ferndale Road, Malvern Road and Montague Road. While not formally part of Bushwood, Ferndale has a similar mix of housing and gentrification. It also has a residents' association for the area, modelled on the sister Bushwood association.

== Gallery ==
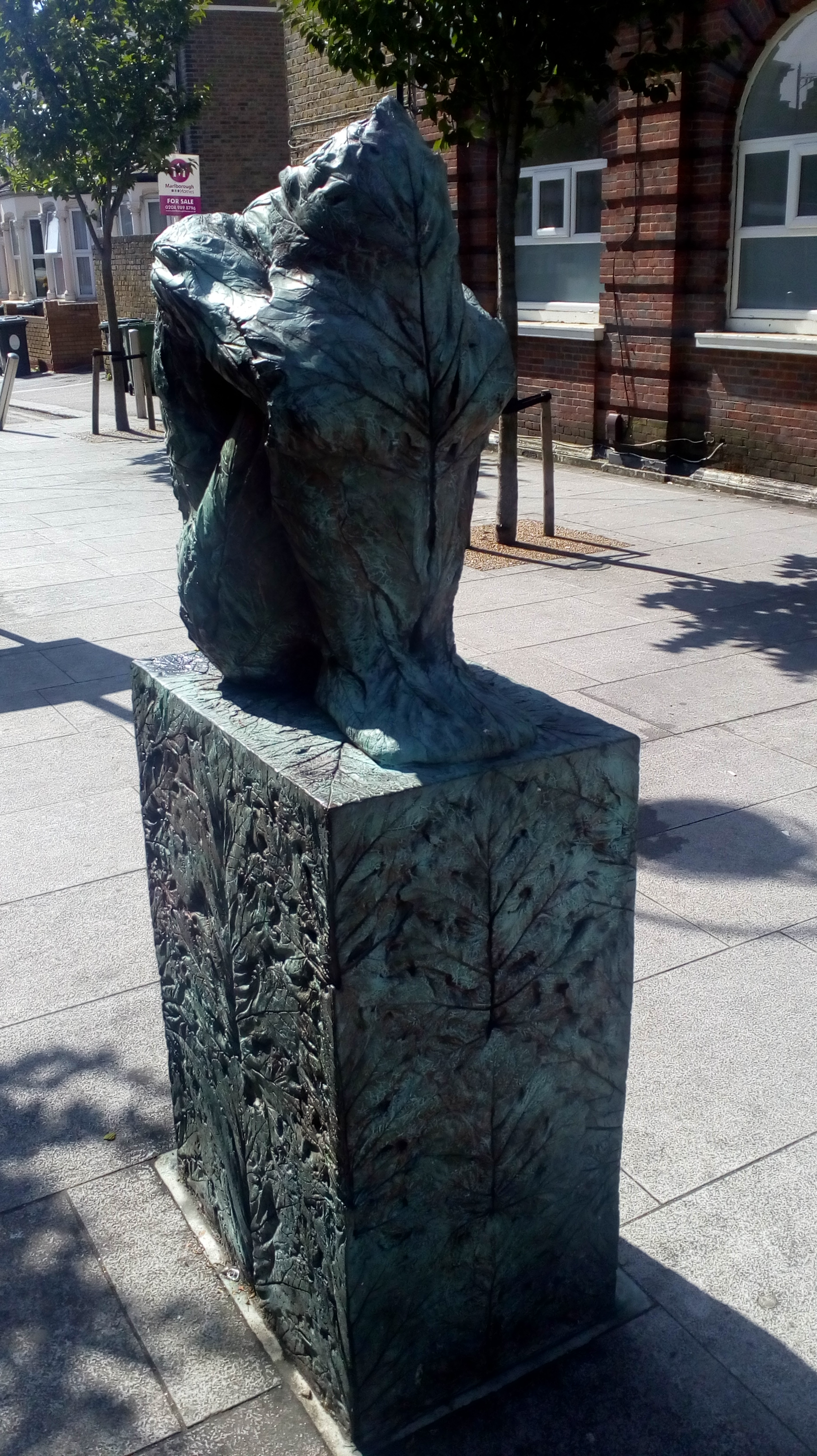
Sculpture by Stephen Duncan in Bushwood area of Leytonstone

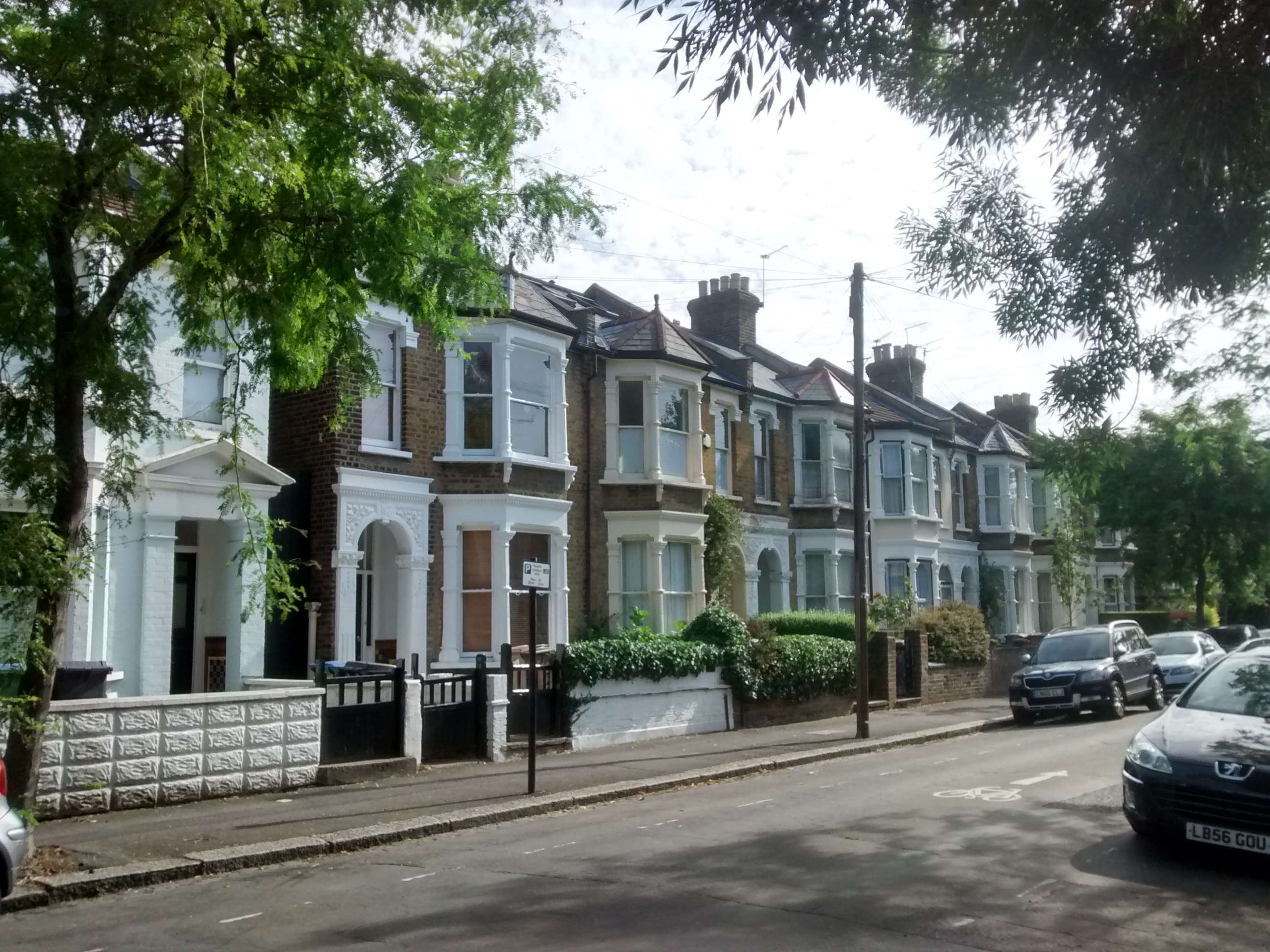
Row of Victorian houses in Bushwood area of Leytonstone
