= Leytonstone Mosque =

Mosque in London, England, United Kingdom

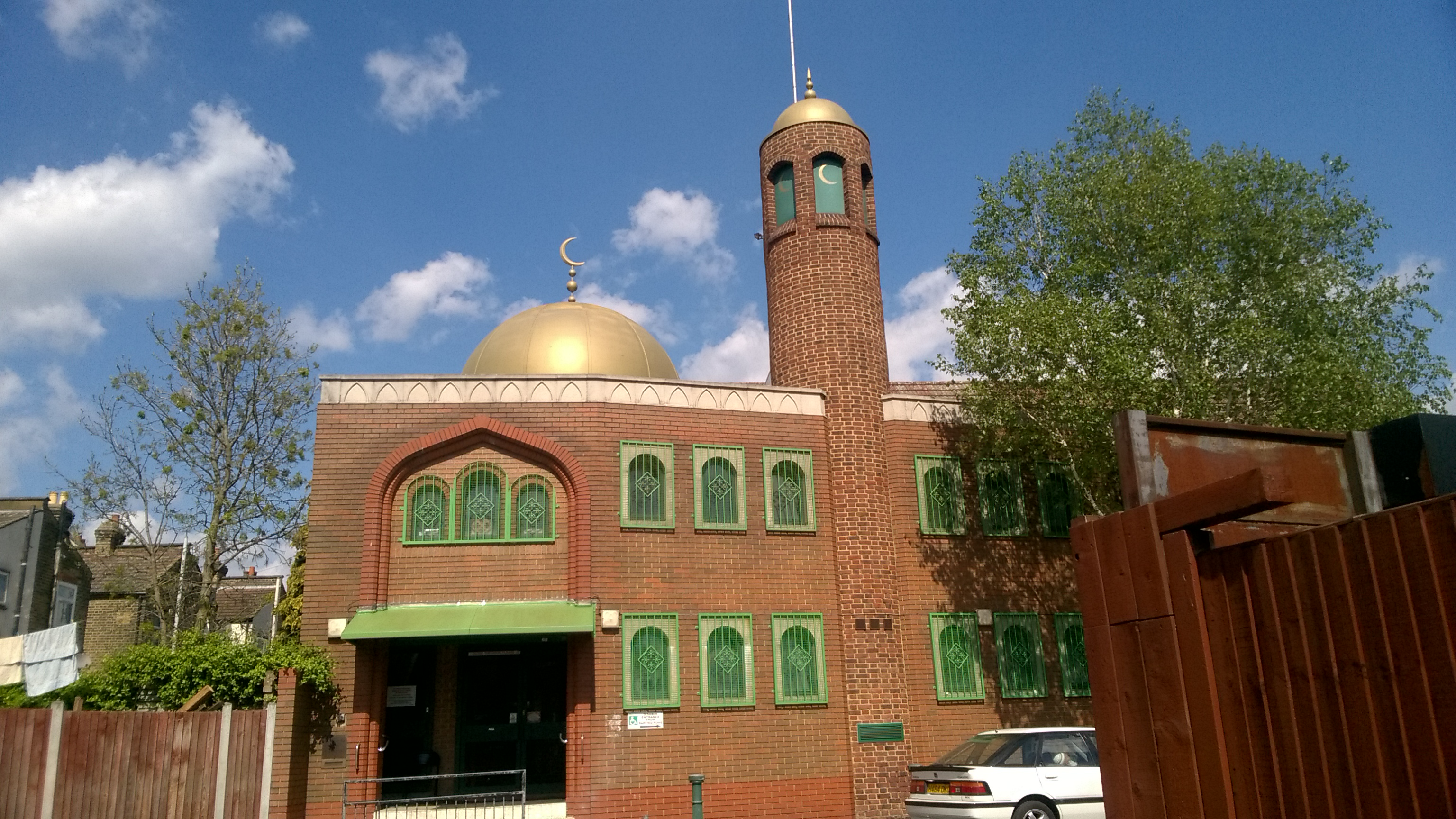

- Location within London Borough of Waltham Forest

Location
- Location: London, England, United Kingdom
- Coordinates: 51.5682°N 0.0129°E

Architecture
- Type: mosque
- Established: 1976
- Capacity: 1,000 worshippers

Website
- Leytonstone Masjid

Leytonstone Mosque, situated in Bushwood, Leytonstone, in the London borough of Waltham Forest, was opened in 1976 to cater to the local Muslim community. Since then, the mosque has grown in size and can accommodate about 1,000 (men only). The organisation 'Muslims in Britain' classifies the Leytonstone Mosque as Deobandi (a movement within Sunni Islam).

== Pre-Mosque Era ==
Prior to the Masjid's establishment, the Leytonstone Islamic Association was set up to serve the local Muslim population, and between 1969 and 1976 would do so by hiring out a hall, which would be used for prayers. Collections then took place in order to fund the purchase of a property which would later be converted into a mosque. In 1976, with donations entirely provided by the local Muslim community, a church was purchased, and subsequently converted into a mosque.

== Services ==
The Mosque provides many services, which include evening classes for 5–16-year-old boys.

- Hifz (Memorization of the Quran)
- Arabic (Quran)
- Hadith
- Fiqh
- History
- Aqeedah

== See also ==
- Islam in London
- Islamic schools and branches
- Islamism in London
- List of mosques in the United Kingdom
