= Leave-Taking =

EP by Rocket Juice & the Moon
- Released: 2012
- Recorded: 2008–2011
- Studio: Studio 13, London, UK
- Length: 7:00
- Label: Honest Jon's
- Producer: Damon Albarn, Tony Allen & Flea

Damon Albarn chronology
Rocket Juice & the Moon (2012)	Leave-Taking (2012)	Dr Dee (2012)

Leave-Taking EP is an EP by Damon Albarn, Tony Allen and Flea under the name Rocket Juice & the Moon.

== Background ==
The project was announced in mid-2008; however due to various other projects by the band members recording was repeatedly delayed. Allen had previously worked with Albarn as a drummer on the album, The Good, the Bad & the Queen. On 27 October 2011, Albarn released a statement announcing the band's name. He said that he had nothing to do with naming the band and that someone in Lagos did the sleeve design for the album and that's the name he gave it. Albarn said he is fine with the name because trying to find a name for another band is always tricky.

The band's debut album contains 18 tracks and was released on 26 March 2012. The album contains guest appearances by Erykah Badu, Hypnotic Brass Ensemble, M.anifest and many others. The EP contains three tracks, all of which appear on the band's eponymous debut album.

== Track list ==
No.	Title	Length
1.	"Leave-Taking" (featuring Hypnotic Brass Ensemble)	2:07
2.	"1-2-3-4-5-6"	3:04
3.	"Forward Sweep"	1:49

== Personnel ==
Rocket Juice & the Moon

- Damon Albarn – guitar, keyboard, vocals
- Tony Allen – drums, percussion
- Flea – bass guitar

Additional musicians

- Hypnotic Brass Ensemble – brass, horns, featured artist

Production

- Stephen Sedgwick – recording, engineer
- Jason Cox – recording
- John Foyle – assistant recording
- Boris Persikoff – recording (in Chicago)
- Abel Garibaldi – recording (in Paris)
- Jimi Bowman – recording (in New York City)
- Mark Ernestus – mixing
