= Effects of the April 2010 Eyjafjallajökull eruption =

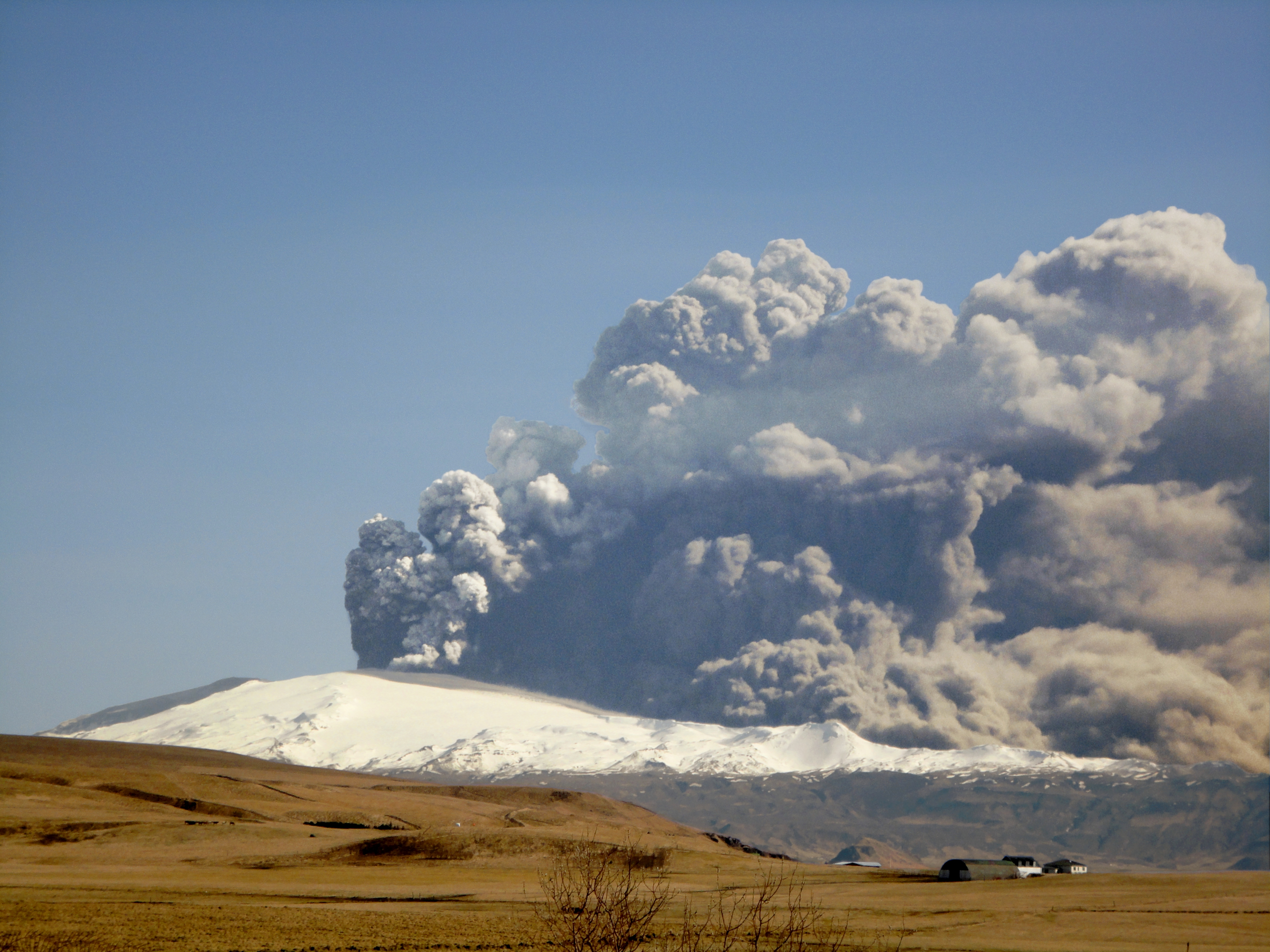
The eruption of Eyjafjallajökull

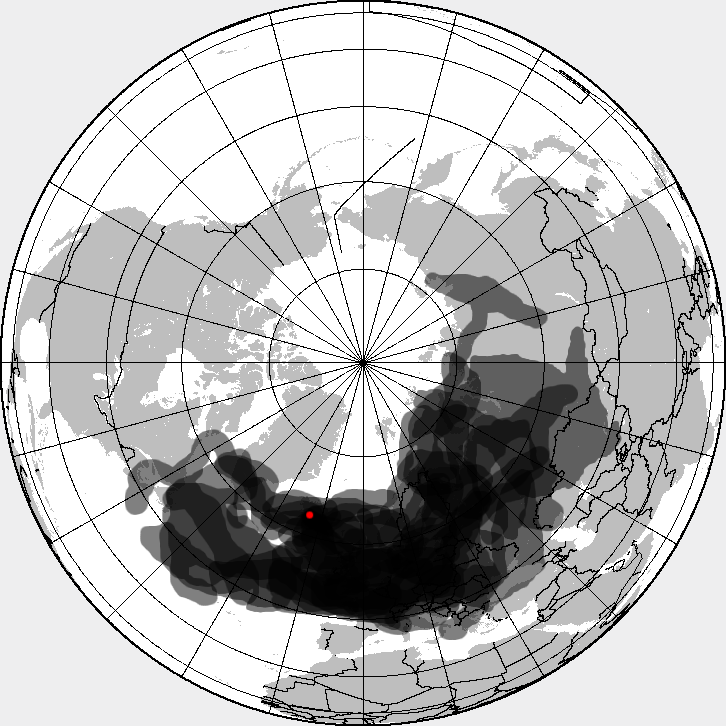
Composite map of the volcanic ash cloud spanning 20 March 2010.

The eruption of the Eyjafjallajökull volcano in Iceland on 20 March 2010 affected the economic, political and cultural activities in Europe and across the world.

There was an extensive air travel disruption caused by the closure of airspace over many countries affecting the travel arrangements of hundreds of thousands of people in Europe and elsewhere. Sporting, entertainment and many other events were cancelled, delayed or disrupted when individuals or teams were unable to travel to their destination.

The state funeral of President of Poland Lech Kaczyński and his wife Maria Kaczyńska on 18 April 2010 was affected as some national leaders were unable to attend, including Barack Obama, Stephen Harper, Angela Merkel, and Nicolas Sarkozy.

== Economic Impacts ==
=== Airline industry ===
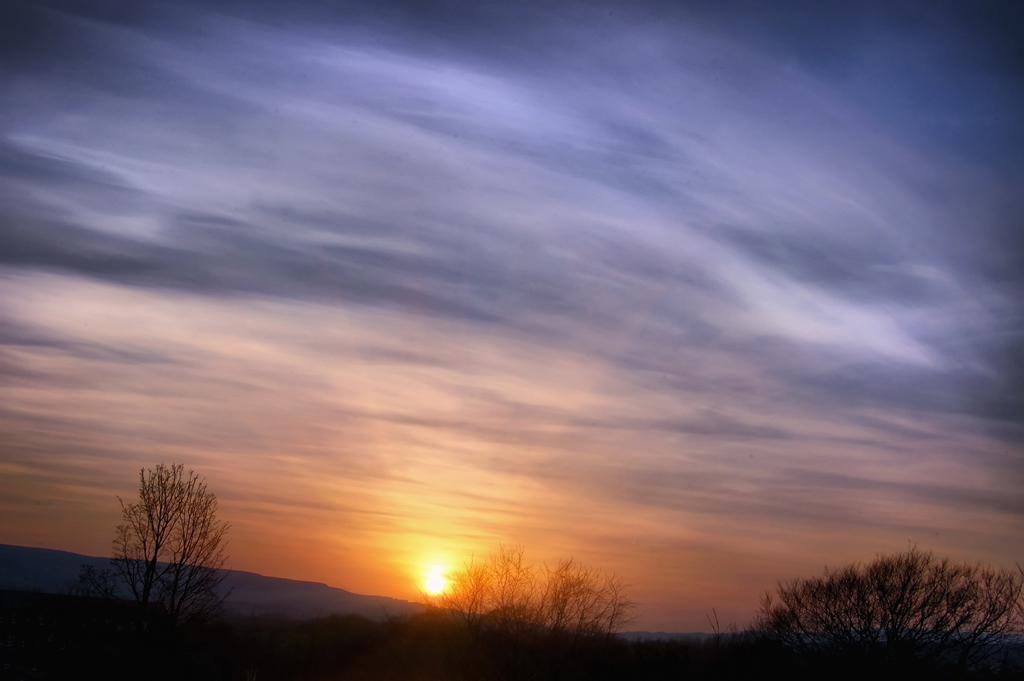
Particulate matter in the ejected dust scatters light from the setting sun, generating 'volcanic lavenders' like this one over the flight path of Leeds-Bradford Airport in England during the aviation shutdown.

Air travel and transport throughout the world was cancelled due to the airspace restrictions and the International Air Transport Association (IATA) estimated the airline industry worldwide would lose £130 million ($200 million) a day as a result. IATA stated that the total loss for the airline industry was around US$1.7 billion (£1.1 billion, €1.3 billion). The Airport Operators Association (AOA) estimated that airports lost £80 million over the six-and-a-half days. Over 95,000 flights had been cancelled all across Europe during the six-day travel ban, with later figures suggesting 107,000 flights cancelled during an 8-day period, accounting for 48% of total air traffic and roughly 10 million passengers.

Following the travel disruption, EU ministers agreed to accelerate the integration of national air traffic control systems into the Single European Sky and also to the immediate creation of a crisis coordination group to handle future transport disruptions.

=== European economies ===
Several sectors that depend on air-freighted imports and exports were badly affected by the flight disruptions.

Imports of medications were affected, and local stocks, as they expire.

Business people and officials expressed concerns about imports of fresh food and other essential goods into the United Kingdom.

FedEx, DHL Express and other logistics companies were unable to transport goods by air. Instead they had to transport packages to alternate destination (such as Istanbul or Madrid) and then ship by road to the final destination.

Travel firm TUI Travel reported losses of £5–6 million per day during the airspace closure due to travellers being unable to return home.

The carmaker BMW said it was suspending production at three of its plants in Germany, because of interruptions in the supply of parts. As waylaid travellers scrambled for other modes of transport, ferry and railway companies enjoyed an unexpected bonanza, while some car-hire firms were reportedly hiking charges.

In the United Kingdom alone thirteen travel firms collapsed during the summer of 2010. The ash cloud disruption was cited as one of the contributing factors.

=== African economies ===
Kenya is reported to have destroyed 400 tonnes of flowers it was unable to airship into the UK on 19 and 20 April 2010. As a result, their economy was estimated to be incurring losses of $3.8m each day of the disruption. Thousands of Kenyan farm workers were temporarily laid off as harvesting of flowers and vegetables was stopped by 19 April due to the grounding of flights. The Kenya Flower Council said 3,000 tonnes of flowers were destroyed and the Fresh Produce Exporters Association of Kenya called the situation "disastrous".

Zambia's flower and vegetable industry lost about $150,000 (£98,000) a day. Other African industries, such as Uganda's fish and flower export businesses, were also affected by the lack of air freight.

=== Asian economies ===
Nissan declared a suspension in the production of three models in Japan on 21 April 2010 because supply of parts has been disrupted. It stopped production of 2,000 vehicles in two plants. Honda also announced a partial halt to production. Factories in China's Guangdong province saw air shipments of clothes and jewellery delayed. In South Korea, Samsung and LG were unable to air-freight more than 20% of their daily electronics exports and the Federation of Hong Kong Industries said hotels and restaurants in Hong Kong were facing shortages of European produce.

=== New Zealand economies ===
The New Zealand fisheries economy was helped by the disruption caused to air transport in Europe. Difficulties in bringing fresh salmon to international markets normally supplied by Norway and other northern European states have substantially boosted orders for New Zealand salmon. Similarly the Netherlands is unable to supply orchids for the start of the May wedding market in North America.

== Impact on politicians and royalty ==
=== Travel disruption ===
Ash cloud on 15 April 2010

A number of world leaders and politicians had to postpone planned trips or were diverted and delayed due to the closure of airports and airspace:

- Prime Minister of Russia, Vladimir Putin postponed a trip to Murmansk on 15 April.
- Norwegian prime minister Jens Stoltenberg was in New York City for a conference and was unable to return to Oslo on schedule. Stoltenberg and his entourage flew to Madrid on Friday, and then onto Basel, Switzerland. Unable to get a train from Basel, they travelled the rest of the way by car.
- The president of Portugal, Aníbal Cavaco Silva had to extend his state visit to the Czech Republic. The president made his way from Prague to Barcelona by car and then took a Falcon of the Portuguese Air Force home to Lisbon. President Silva arrived in Portugal on the evening of 18 April. Angela Merkel, Chancellor of Germany was forced to make a "surprise" visit to Portugal as she returned from the Nuclear Security Summit in Washington DC. She was expected to return to Germany by 10 am on Saturday, but has since then flown to Rome and is also expected to return home to Germany by car.
- The ban on flights in the UK disrupted the UK general election campaign trail on 15 April. Liberal Democrat treasury spokesperson Vince Cable's visit to Dunfermline and West Fife was terminated, as was Labour Defence Secretary Bob Ainsworth's journey to Scotland. Former British prime minister, Tony Blair, got stranded in Israel during his scheduled election campaign tour.
- Emir of Qatar Hamad bin Khalifa Al Thani postponed an official two-day state visit to Germany, originally scheduled for 18–20 April.
- On 18 April, the Pakistani prime minister Yousuf Raza Gilani was forced to cancel his visit to France and a summit in Brussels.
- On 20 April, disruption to the Irish Government business occurred when nine government and six opposition members of Dáil Éireann, the lower house of the Parliament of Ireland, were stranded at various destinations around the world. The Government passed one vote by a majority of two TDs that day, narrowly avoiding defeat.

=== Funeral of Lech and Maria Kaczyńska ===
The funeral of President of Poland Lech Kaczyński and his wife, who died on 10 April 2010 in a plane crash in Smolensk, Russia, took place on 18 April. Due to the disruptions in travel, several national leaders cancelled their plans to attend, including Barack Obama, Stephen Harper, Angela Merkel, and Nicolas Sarkozy. Presidential aide Jacek Sasin initially said a postponement until later that day or even the following day was a "very serious alternative", but it was later announced that the funeral would take place as planned. On 17 April, delegations from India, Japan, South Korea, Mexico, New Zealand and Pakistan confirmed they would not attend. Obama released a statement on Saturday afternoon saying that he would not be able to attend the funeral due to the traffic disruptions. He stated, in a phone call to acting president Bronisław Komorowski, "Michelle and I continue to have the Polish people in our thoughts and prayers..."

=== Disruption to royal families ===
The travel plans of members of European royal families from countries such as the Netherlands, Norway, Sweden, and Spain were cancelled — they had intended to travel to Copenhagen to celebrate the 70th birthday of Margrethe II of Denmark. The Dutch, Norwegian, and Swedish royal families changed their plans from air to car or rail.

The British royal family's travel plans were disrupted, including the cancellation of the Prince of Wales's attendance at the state funeral of the Polish president and first lady, and the Princess Royal's plan to visit Halifax, Nova Scotia for a Canadian Forces celebration, scheduled for 21 April.

== Military and civil impact ==
The Forecasting Economic Support Group of ICAO's Committee on Aviation Environment Protection postponed a planned summit in Bern as North American and Scandinavian members would be unable to attend. It caused a huge economic failure.

The repatriation of five German Bundeswehr soldiers wounded in action on 15 April 2010 in Afghanistan had to be postponed due to the closing of the German airspace. The MEDEVAC plane carrying them from Termez Airbase was rerouted to Istanbul where they are to be treated pending further developments.

On 20 April 2010, it was reported that around 160 Irish troops, mainly from Dublin and Dundalk and from the Eastern Brigade and due to return home on a chartered plane from a peacekeeping mission in Kosovo, were stranded in the Balkans due to the travel disruption. They remained at Camp Clarke outside Pristina.

== Cultural impacts ==
=== Art ===
The disruption had effects on the arts worldwide, with many events subject to cancellations. Further, many delegations from the Eurovision Song Contest 2010 were forced to travel to Norway by boat.

One of the early widely reported incidents was the trouble of actor/comedian John Cleese, who spent 30,000 Norwegian kroner (roughly £3,300) on a taxi journey from Oslo to Brussels after his flight from Norway was cancelled. He had been appearing on Skavlan. The 1,500 kilometre journey lasted around 15 hours, and Cleese passed through Norway, Sweden, Denmark, Germany, the Netherlands and Belgium during his journey.

Robert Downey Jr., Gwyneth Paltrow, Demi Moore and American band The Drums were unable to make their scheduled appearance on Friday Night with Jonathan Ross on 23 April due to the flight disruption, The Iron Man 2 World Premiere in the UK in relation to Downey Jr. and Paltrow's appearance was also moved to LA from London.

==== Music ====
Some British musical acts scheduled to perform at the 2010 Coachella Valley Music and Arts Festival in California, including Bad Lieutenant, Gary Numan, Delphic, Frightened Rabbit, Talvin Singh and The Cribs and the American group Hypnotic Brass Ensemble (who were touring in Europe) encountered flight cancellations, jeopardizing their scheduled slots, all of them eventually cancelling their performances.

Carnegie Hall cancelled a concert of the works of Louis Andriessen because pianist Gerard Bouwhuis was stranded in Amsterdam and the Bang on a Can All-Stars were unable to leave Frankfurt.

The Yehudi Menuhin International Competition for Young Violinists, held in Oslo, Norway was also affected, it was scheduled to begin on 16 April but was postponed until 18 April due to traffic disruption.

The appearance of pop singer Annie Lennox on the special "Idol Gives Back" episode of American Idol on 21 April was affected. Originally, Lennox was to have appeared at the Pasadena Civic Auditorium, near Los Angeles, to perform "Universal Child" as part of the charity fundraiser. However, since she could not travel to LA, Lennox instead recorded the song at a television studio in London, and the tape was played back on the live broadcast. The orchestra accompanied the song live as if she was actually there.

==== Film ====
The 2013 French comedy film Eyjafjallajökull is a road movie starting when a divorced couple is forced to drive across Europe due to the cancellation of their flight.

=== Sports ===
The flight disruptions also led to a number of sporting fixtures being postponed or cancelled as teams could not fly to their fixtures.

Events which were disrupted due to participants being unable to attend include:

- The 2010 Japanese motorcycle Grand Prix, scheduled to be the second round of the Grand Prix motorcycle racing season was postponed until 2 October 2010, as the majority of teams were unable to travel to the circuit from their European bases.
- The French rugby league teams competing in the Challenge Cup
- In rugby union, the match was postponed between Switzerland and Lithuania in the third division of the European Nations Cup
- Multiple teams were delayed or were forced to withdraw from the World Mixed Doubles Curling Championship and World Senior Curling Championships due to air travel disruption.
- Several cyclists who reside in Spain were unable to make it to the Amstel Gold Race, including favorites Alejandro Valverde and Luis León Sánchez
- Professional wrestler Douglas Williams, who was to defend his TNA X Division Championship at the Total Nonstop Action Wrestling pay-per-view event Lockdown, was unable to fly out of the United Kingdom. This resulted in Williams being stripped of his title.
- Mixed martial arts fighter Jim Wallhead was due to fight in the Bellator season 2 welterweight tournament, but had to withdraw because he could not travel to the United States from England.
- The Boston Marathon, on 19 April, took place without many athletes who had been in the affected countries.
- WWE Monday Night Raw, also on 19 April, was staged almost entirely with fill-in talent from the Friday Night Smackdown brand. The only Raw-brand "superstars" who made the show were Triple H, Vladimir Kozlov, Carlito as well as Commentators Michael Cole and Jerry Lawler, as the remaining stars were in Belfast following a European tour.
- The World Chess Championship was delayed by one day because the defending World Chess Champion Viswanathan Anand was stranded in Frankfurt.
- Fans found travel to the matches extremely difficult with some teams posting significantly lower attendances during the travel disruption.
- Polish footballer Robert Lewandowski was set to transfer to Premier League club Blackburn Rovers from Lech Poznań, with Lewandowski only having to travel to England for the final negotiation. However, the transfer broke down and due to Lewandowski being unable to travel to England, soon after joining Borussia Dortmund, which is credited as having accelerated his career before moving onto Bayern Munich and Barcelona, going on to score over 700 goals for club and country.

Some events were not disrupted but the participants had to make significant alternate travel plans to fulfill the fixture. The UEFA Champions League semi-final teams FC Barcelona and Olympique Lyonnais travelled by coach to their matches with Inter Milan and Bayern Munich respectively and in the Europa League both English travelling teams, Liverpool and Fulham had to make long journeys by coach, train and Eurostar to reach their respective destinations in Madrid and Hamburg.

=== Other ===
The eruption impacted a record-breaking round-the-world flight led by Captain Riccardo Mortara. His private plane was due to land in Keflavik, Iceland, but with runways shut down was forced to abort at the last minute, costing his historic speed flight four to five hours.

== Effect on the environment ==
The volcano released approximately 150,000 tonnes of CO_{2} each day, or approximately 4.5 million tonnes of carbon dioxide by 19 April 2010. The massive reduction of air travel occurring over European skies caused by the ash cloud, saved an estimated 1.3 to 2.8 million tonnes of carbon dioxide from entering the atmosphere by 19 April 2010.

Residents of West London under the Heathrow Airport flight path have described the peace as 'bliss'. John Stewart of the Heathrow Association for the Control of Aircraft Noise said they had been inundated with emails and phone calls and said "The message is that this is what life should be like. The peace and quiet is absolutely wonderful." Christine Shilling, of the No Third Runway Action Group, who lives in nearby Harmondsworth, said: "I've lived here more than 40 years and I've never known such peace." Jenny Tonge, president of HACAN Clearskies, life peer and former Liberal Democrat MP for Richmond Park in London said "Dare we hope that it will finally lay the Third Runway at Heathrow to rest and concentrate government minds on more environmentally friendly and sustainable forms of transport?"
