= Rocket Juice & the Moon =

2012 studio album

Studio album by Rocket Juice & the Moon
- Released: 26 March 2012
- Recorded: 2008–2011
- Studios: Studio 13, London, UK
- Genres: Afrobeat; psychedelic funk
- Length: 52:32
- Label: Honest Jon's

Damon Albarn chronology
The Singles Collection 2001–2011 (2011)	Rocket Juice & the Moon (2012)	Leave-Taking EP (2012)

Rocket Juice & the Moon is the only album by the supergroup of the same name, formed in 2008. The group consisted of Damon Albarn, Flea, and Tony Allen.

== Album history ==
The project was announced in mid-2008; however due to various other projects by the band members recording was repeatedly delayed. Allen had previously worked with Albarn as a drummer on the album, The Good, the Bad & the Queen. On 27 October 2011, Albarn released a statement announcing the band's name. He said that he had nothing to do with naming the band and that someone in Lagos did the sleeve design for the album and that's the name he gave it. Albarn said he is fine with the name because trying to find a name for another band is always tricky.

The band's debut album contains 18 tracks and was released on 26 March 2012. The album contains guest appearances by Erykah Badu, Hypnotic Brass Ensemble, M.anifest and many others.

== Live performances ==
The band performed together for the first time on 29 October 2011 in London, England, as part of an Another Honest Jon's Chop Up! event as Rocketjuice and the Moon.

== Track listing ==
Professional ratings
Aggregate scores
Source	Rating
Metacritic	(71/100)
Review scores
Source	Rating
AllMusic	link
The A.V. Club	B+
The Guardian	4/5 stars
Paste	(6.3/10)
Pitchfork	(6.1/10)

No.	Title	Length
1.	"1-2-3-4-5-6"	3:04
2.	"Hey, Shooter" (featuring Erykah Badu, Hypnotic Brass Ensemble and Thundercat)	4:10
3.	"Lolo" (featuring Fatoumata Diawara, Hypnotic Brass Ensemble and M.anifest)	5:03
4.	"Night Watch"	2:12
5.	"Forward Sweep"	1:49
6.	"Follow-Fashion" (featuring Fatoumata Diawara and M.anifest)	3:57
7.	"Chop Up" (featuring M.anifest and M3NSA)	2:37
8.	"Poison"	3:24
9.	"Extinguished" (featuring Cheick Tidiane Seck)	2:39
10.	"Rotary Connection"	2:02
11.	"Check Out"	2:24
12.	"There" (featuring Cheick Tidiane Seck)	4:51
13.	"Worries"	1:16
14.	"Benko" (featuring Fatoumata Diawara and Hypnotic Brass Ensemble)	2:34
15.	"The Unfadable" (featuring M.anifest)	2:57
16.	"Dam(n)" (featuring Erykah Badu and M.anifest)	2:26
17.	"Fatherless"	3:00
18.	"Leave-Taking" (featuring Hypnotic Brass Ensemble)	2:07
Total length:		52:32

iTunes bonus tracks
No.	Title	Length
19.	"Fatala" (featuring Fatoumata Diawara)	3:51
20.	"Manuela" (featuring Erykah Badu)	5:21

== Personnel ==
Credits adapted from the album's liner notes.

=== Rocket Juice & the Moon ===
- Damon Albarn – guitar, keyboard, vocals, artwork
- Tony Allen – drums, percussion
- Flea – bass guitar

=== Production ===
- Stephen Sedgwick – recording, engineering
- Jason Cox – recording
- John Foyle – recording assistance
- Boris Persikoff – additional recording
- Abel Garibaldi – additional
- Jimi Bowman – additional recording
- Mark Ernestus – mixing

=== Additional musicians ===
- Erykah Badu – vocals (on tracks 2, 16 & 20)
- Thundercat – vocals (on track 2)
- Fatoumata Diawara – vocals (on tracks 3, 6, 14 & 19)
- M.anifest – vocals (on tracks 3, 6, 7 & 16)
- M3NSA – vocals (on track 7)
- Cheick Tidiane Seck – vocals (on tracks 9 & 12)
- Hypnotic Brass Ensemble – horns (on tracks 2, 3, 14 & 18)

=== Other personnel ===
- Demola Ogunajo – artwork
