= Dr Dee =

Opera

Original poster

Dr Dee: An English Opera is an opera created by theatre director Rufus Norris and musician and composer Damon Albarn. Its debut performance was at the Palace Theatre, Manchester in July 2011, as part of the 2011 Manchester International Festival. The opera is based on the life of John Dee, medical and scientific advisor to Elizabeth I.

== Background ==
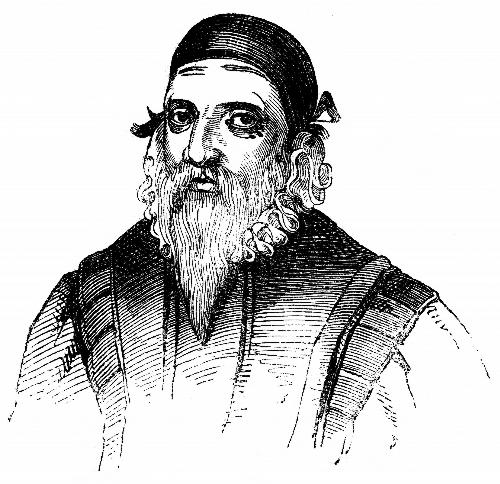
An engraving of John Dee, 1845

Damon Albarn became associated with the Manchester International Festival through a 2006 concert production by his band Gorillaz, Demon Days Live, a 2007 Chinese opera, Monkey: Journey to the West, and a 2009 immersive theatre production, It Felt Like a Kiss, for which he wrote music.

An opera titled Doctor Dee was originally planned as a collaboration between Albarn, Gorillaz partner Jamie Hewlett and comic book author Alan Moore. According to Moore, he was approached by Albarn and Hewlett to collaborate on an opera featuring superheroes, but instead he suggested John Dee as a subject. He withdrew from the project when expected contributions from Albarn and Hewlett to his magazine Dodgem Logic failed to materialise. Moore is credited for "inspiration" in the opera's official programme and his incomplete libretto was published in Strange Attractor magazine.

== Production ==
Dr Dee ran from 1 to 9 July 2011 at the Palace Theatre, Manchester. It was commissioned by the Manchester International Festival, English National Opera and the London 2012 Festival. It was subsequently performed from 26 June to 7 July 2012 at the London Coliseum, as part of the London 2012 Festival.

The opera was scored for a band combining Elizabethan English instruments (viola da gamba, shawm, dulcian, crumhorn, recorder, lute) with the African kora and the distinctive drumming of Nigerian percussionist Tony Allen. Damon Albarn played acoustic guitar and harmonium and sang on a number of songs. A twenty-piece conventional orchestra was provided by the BBC Philharmonic and conducted by André de Ridder.

John Dee, a non-singing part, was played by Bertie Carvel. Dee's wife, Katherine, was played by Anna Dennis. Francis Walsingham was played by Steven Page. Edward Kelley was played by Christopher Robson, whose singing was described as "sublime" by Albarn.

=== Reception ===
The Guardian gave the Manchester production four stars, saying that it "reaches to the heart of the tragedy of an overreaching intellect destroyed by a deal with a second-rate Mephistopheles". The Independent also awarded four stars, saying that the production was "mostly a triumph, but the opening dumb show and final song don't work". Rupert Christiansen in The Daily Telegraph gave the same star-rating, describing the opera as "fresh, original and heartfelt". The NME described it as "visually sumptuous and musically haunting".

== Soundtrack ==
Dr Dee

Soundtrack album by Damon Albarn
- Released: 7 May 2012
- Recorded: 2011
- Studios: Studio 13, London; MediaCityUK, Salford
- Genres: Folk; Renaissance; classical; opera
- Length: 48:05
- Label: Parlophone
- Producer: Damon Albarn

Damon Albarn chronology
Leave-Taking EP (2012)	Dr Dee (2012)	Blur 21 (2012)

Damon Albarn solo chronology
Democrazy (2003)	Dr Dee (2012)	Everyday Robots (2014)

Professional ratings
Review scores
Source	Rating
AllMusic	3/5 stars
Classic Rock	8/10 stars

=== Track listing ===
All tracks are written by Damon Albarn.

No.	Title	Length
1.	"The Golden Dawn"	3:56
2.	"Apple Carts"	2:37
3.	"O Spirit, Animate Us"	3:48
4.	"The Moon Exalted"	5:43
5.	"A Man of England"	3:17
6.	"Saturn"	2:05
7.	"Coronation"	1:10
8.	"The Marvelous Dream"	2:23
9.	"A Prayer"	1:33
10.	"Edward Kelley"	3:29
11.	"Preparation"	3:01
12.	"9 Point Star"	1:33
13.	"Temptation Comes in the Afternoon"	2:05
14.	"Watching the Fire that Waltzed Away"	2:37
15.	"Moon (Interlude)"	0:29
16.	"Cathedrals"	3:01
17.	"Tree of Beauty"	2:00
18.	"The Dancing King"	3:24
Total length:		48:05

=== Personnel ===
- Damon Albarn – vocals, harmony vocals, backing vocals, acoustic guitar, producer, artwork

Production

- Stephen Sedgwick – engineer, recording
- Stephen Rinker – engineer
- Andre De Ridder – conductor
- Valgeir Sigurdsson – mixing
- Alexander Overington – assistant mixing
- Einar Stefannsson – assistant mixing
- Paul Evans – assistant mixing
- Tim Young – mastering

Additional musicians

- Tony Allen – drums
- Simon Tong – guitar
- Mike Smith – organ
- Arngeir Hauksson – theorbo
- Madou Diabate – kora
- Liam Byrne – viol
- Anne Allen – wind
- Bill Lyons – wind
- David Hatcher – wind
- Anna Dennis – vocals
- Bertie Carvel – vocals
- Christopher Robson – vocals
- Melanie Pappenheim – vocals
- Stephen Page – vocals
- Victoria Couper – vocals
- BBC Philharmonic
- Palace Voices – vocals

Other personnel

- Stephen Higgins – music supervisor
- Paul Arditti – recording consultant
