= Hypnotic Brass Ensemble (album) =

Studio album by Hypnotic Brass Ensemble
- Released: May 26, 2009
- Genre: Jazz
- Length: 54:19
- Label: Honest Jon's

Hypnotic Brass Ensemble chronology
The Brothas (2008)	Hypnotic Brass Ensemble (2009)	Bulletproof Brass (2011)

Hypnotic Brass Ensemble is a studio album by Hypnotic Brass Ensemble, an American brass band consisting of the sons of Phil Cohran. It was released on May 26, 2009, through Honest Jon's. It peaked at number 30 on the UK Independent Albums Chart, as well as number 10 on the UK Jazz & Blues Albums Chart.

== Background ==
Hypnotic Brass Ensemble was formed in Chicago. They toured across the United States and Europe. While performing on the street in London, they caught the ear of Honest Jon's' Alan Scholefield.

The album includes re-recordings of the band's earlier material, as well as renditions of Phil Cohran's "Alyo" and Moondog's "Rabbit Hop". At the time, the band consisted of eight sons of Cohran: Gabriel (on trumpet), Tycho (on sousaphone), Amal (on trumpet), Uttama (on euphonium), Saiph (on trombone), Jafar (on trumpet), Seba (on trombone), and Tarik (on trumpet).

== Critical reception ==
Professional ratings
Review scores
Source	Rating
AllMusic	4/5 stars
MusicOMH	4/5 stars
PopMatters	7/10

Dan Raper of PopMatters commented that "Though Hypnotic Brass Ensemble is generally impressive, it may be in the live setting — whether that be outside on the street or on stage at a club — that the group likely has its greatest impact." He called the album "Nothing particularly innovative, but well executed." K. Ross Hoffman of AllMusic stated, "Anchored by sturdy, simple drum parts and Tycho Cohran's supple, syncopated sousaphone basslines, the Hypnotic Brass Ensemble blow dense chord clusters, indelibly soulful unison melodies, and tuneful interlocking counterlines, with only occasional focused soloing and emphasis on accessibility and groove." He added, "As a whole, it makes for an exceedingly spirited and largely unique listening experience."

== Track listing ==
Hypnotic Brass Ensemble track listing
No.	Title	Length
1.	"Alyo"	3:02
2.	"Gibbous"	3:00
3.	"War"	2:50
4.	"Ballicki Bone"	5:27
5.	"Flipside"	4:49
6.	"Marcus Garvey"	3:44
7.	"Jupiter"	6:21
8.	"Party Started"	6:02
9.	"Rabbit Hop"	3:57
10.	"Sankofa"	3:35
11.	"Hypnotic"	2:50
12.	"Satin Sheets"	3:49
13.	"Rabbit Hop (Version)"	2:21
Total length:		54:19

== Personnel ==
Credits adapted from liner notes.

Hypnotic Brass Ensemble

- Gabriel Hubert (Hudah) – trumpet
- Amal Hubert (Baji) – trumpet
- Jafar Graves (Yosh) – trumpet
- Tarik Graves (Smoov) – trumpet
- Saiph Graves (Cid) – trombone
- Seba Graves (Clef) – trombone
- Tycho Cohran (LT) – sousaphone
- Uttama Hubert (Rocco) – euphonium

Additional musicians

- Malcolm Catto – drums (1, 2, 11, 12)
- Sola Akingbola – drums (3–5, 7–10, 13)
- Flea – bass guitar (4)
- Tony Allen – drums (6)
- Damon Albarn – synthesizer (13)

Technical personnel

- Will Bankhead – photography, design
- Laurence Gascoigne – horns illustration
- Seb Monk – film

== Charts ==
Chart performance for Hypnotic Brass Ensemble
Chart (2009)	Peak position
UK Independent Albums (OCC)	30
UK Jazz & Blues Albums (OCC)	10
