= God MC (song) =

"god MC"
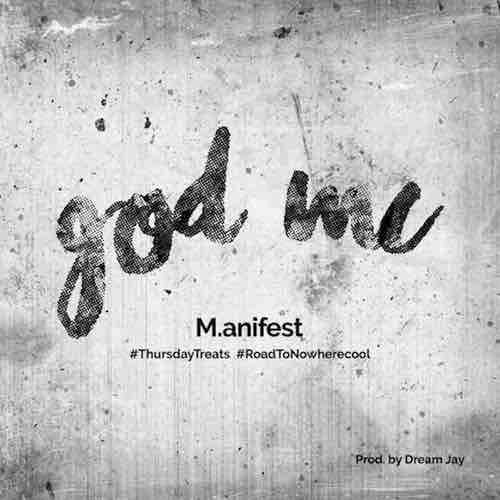

Single by M.anifest
- Released: June 30, 2016
- Recorded: June 2016
- Genre: Hip hop
- Length: 3:50
- Label: Singitdamnit Music
- Songwriter: Kwame Ametepe Tsikata
- Producer: Dream Jay

"god MC" is a hip hop song by Ghanaian artist M.anifest released on June 30, 2016. The single comes off after the Makaa Maka rapper announced his upcoming album, titled Nowhere cool. The song humorously features popular actor "Kwadwo Nkansah - Liwin"’s comedy skit "I can't think far.." It was produced by Dream Jay, mixed and mastered by Mobeats.

The song premiered on Y 102.5 FM (Kumasi) and was released later onto the Internet. Lyrically, the song addresses altercations made by several musicians claiming to be the leaders of hip hop in Ghana.

== Background and release ==
On June 27, 2016, M.anifest announced on Twitter to release new music via his SoundCloud page. “NEW music this week…” #preAlbumMadness, he added.

At the 9:30 am, the new hip hop single by M.anifest was released online.

The song follows after M.anifest's single and video "W'ani Aba" featuring Bisa Kdei.

== Controversies ==
The song was heavily publicized following its released. Fans attention was brought to the lyrics by M.anifest in which the rapper proposed several theories as why some artists are claiming to be superior in the music industry.

The song garnered many responses from fans, critics and some notable Ghanaian musicians like Shatta Wale, EL and Reggie Rockstone. "...I love beef especially ones with no spices...", Shatta Wale tweeted.

Many critics and fans applauded M.anifest for such an enviable performance on the song. Later, social media was flooded with comments that the song was targeted at EL and Sarkodie.

Their assertion is based on the lyrical content of EL's "King Without A Crown" and Sarkodie's "Bossy" - many hip hop critics also believed Sarkodie on the "Bossy" track was taking hot swipes at EL which later fumed #SARKODIEorEL trend on Twitter.

Hip hop lovers across the country have already certified that the song would go down in history as a milestone in Ghana music.

== Sarkodie's reply ==
On July 4, 2016, BET award-winning rapper, Sarkodie released "Kanta", a diss-reply to Manifest's "god MC".

In the song, the rapper unleashed personal attacks on the latter which also included defaming the brand equity of Vlisco's GTP and Woodin.

Later, Sarkodie's lawyer Moses Foh Amoaning on Adom FM apologized to GTP and the public. According to the lawyer, Sarkodie was a bit carried away because of emotions and that his client was very angry. He again apologized for the Afrocentric line Sark used.

== Personnel ==
- Written by Kwame Ametepe Tsikata
- Produced by Dream Jay
- Mixed and mastered by Mobeats
