= Death and state funeral of Lech and Maria Kaczyński =

2010 death of Polish President and his wife

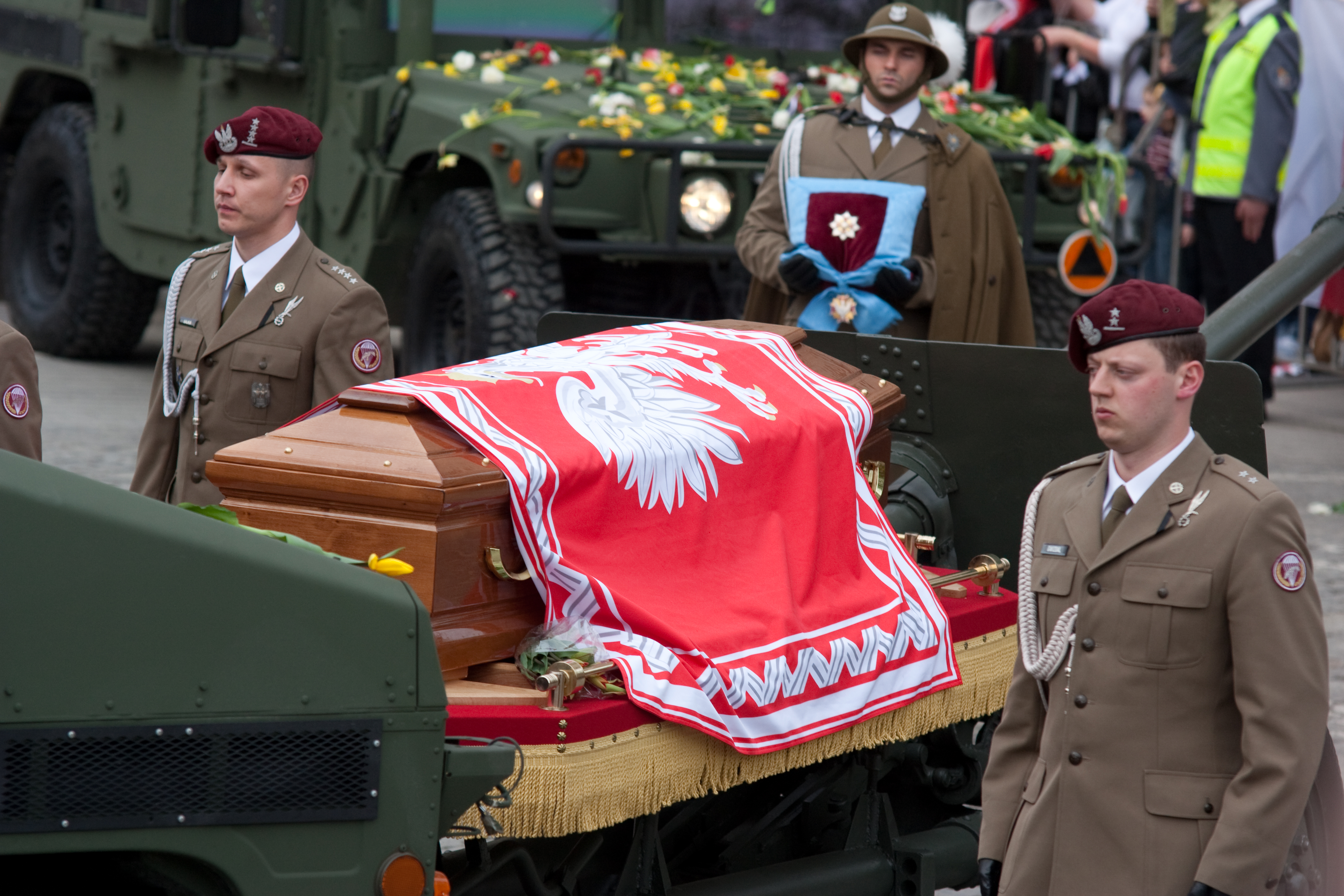
- President Lech Kaczyński's coffin in funeral procession to Wawel Cathedral, a gun carriage carrying the coffin of First Lady Maria Kaczyńska is seen in the background
- Native name: Uroczystości pogrzebowe pary prezydenckiej Lecha Kaczyńskiego i Marii Kaczyńskiej
- Date: 10 April 2010 (death); 11 April to 18 April 2010 (mourning period); 18 April 2010 (state funeral)
- Location: Smolensk Oblast, Russia (death); St. Mary's Basilica, Kraków (state funeral); Wawel Cathedral, Kraków (burial)

Lech Kaczyński, the fourth president of the Republic of Poland, died on 10 April 2010, after a Polish Air Force Tu-154 crashed outside of Smolensk, Russia, killing all 96 aboard. His wife, economist and first lady Maria Kaczyńska, was also among those killed.

After the death of Kaczyński was announced, a week of mourning was declared by the acting President of Poland, Bronisław Komorowski, spanning 11 to 18 April with a state funeral for the couple held on 18 April. Several countries observed a day of national mourning on the date of the funeral. The couple were buried together in a crypt in the Wawel Cathedral, Kraków, afterwards.

== Death ==
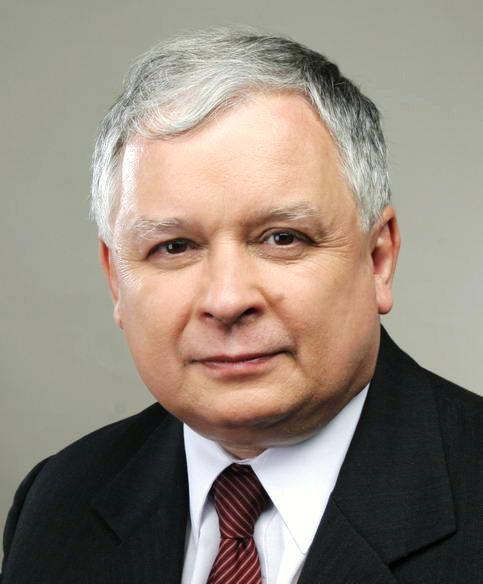
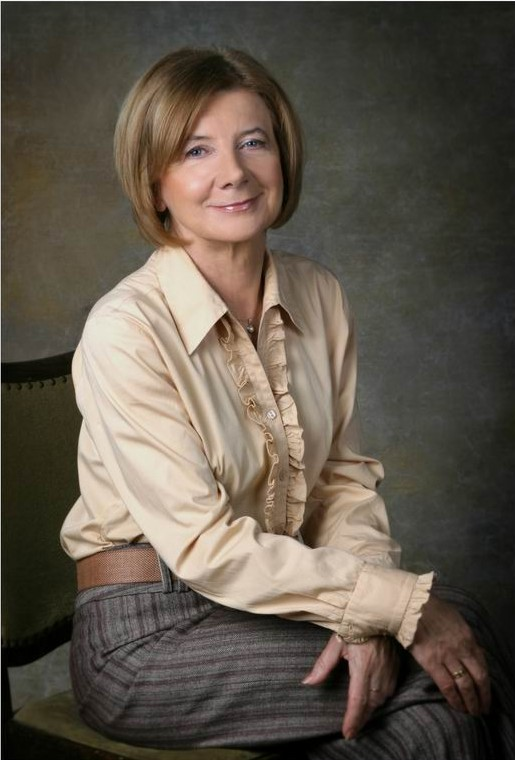
Lech Kaczyński and Maria Kaczyńska

On 10 April 2010, a Polish Air Force Tupolev Tu-154M aircraft crash landed near Smolensk, Russia, killing all 96 passengers and crew. Those killed include Kaczyński, and his wife; the chief of the Polish General Staff and other senior Polish military officers; the president of the National Bank of Poland; Poland's deputy foreign minister; Polish government officials; 12 members of the Polish parliament, including vice-speakers; senior members of the Polish clergy; and relatives of victims of the Katyn massacre. They were en route from Warsaw to attend an event to mark the 70th anniversary of the massacre. The site of the massacre is approximately 19 kilometres (12 mi) west of Smolensk.

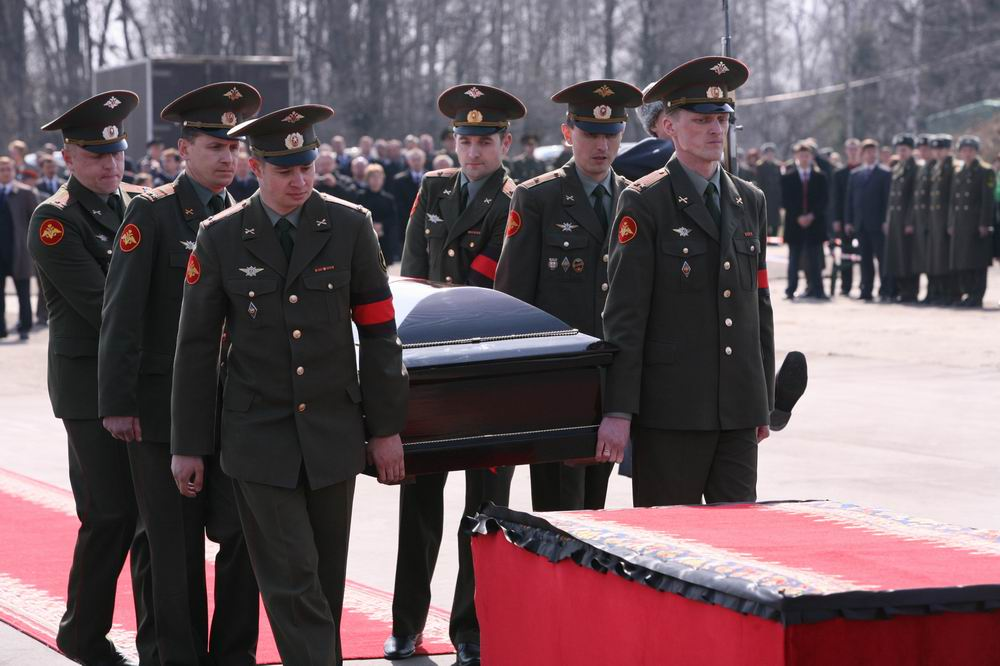
The coffin of President Lech Kaczyński in Smolensk, Russia on 11 April 2010, one day after the crash, before being transported to Warsaw

The cause of the crash was investigated. According to preliminary reports, the pilot attempted to land at Smolensk Airbase in fog which reduced visibility to about 500 metres (1,600 ft), The plane was too low as it approached the runway, striking trees in the fog, turning around and falling to the ground 200 metres (660 ft) from the airfield in a wooded area, where it broke into pieces.

Polish parliamentary speaker Bronisław Komorowski immediately became Acting President of Poland in law.

== Declarations and tributes ==
The international response to Kaczyński's death and the deaths of the other people on board saw countries and many other entities express sorrow and condolences to the people of Poland.

At least 96 countries, 13 international organizations and several other entities expressed their reaction on behalf of the incident. An official mourning was proclaimed in 22 countries other than Poland.

== Funeral events ==
=== Period of mourning ===
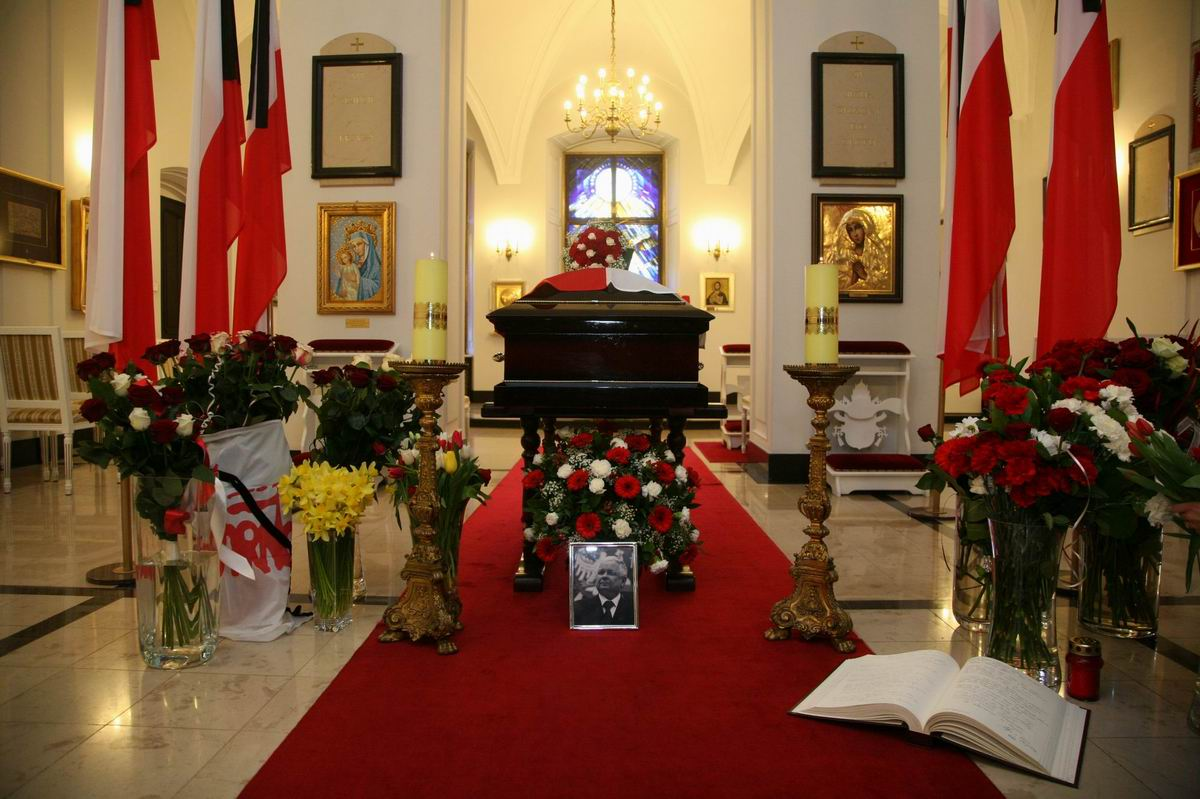
Coffin of Lech Kaczyński in the Presidential Palace's chapel in Warsaw

A week of national mourning was declared in Poland. Poles around the world mourned Kaczyński and set up shrines in the week that followed. Many wept openly. Flags flew at half staff in Poland. Sports fixtures, including women's U-17 UEFA Championship elite qualifying phase game Poland versus Republic of Ireland in Ukraine, were postponed. Concerts were cancelled, while cinemas, theatres, restaurants and shopping malls were closed. Streets emptied.

==== 11–13 April 2010 (repatriation, lying in state) ====
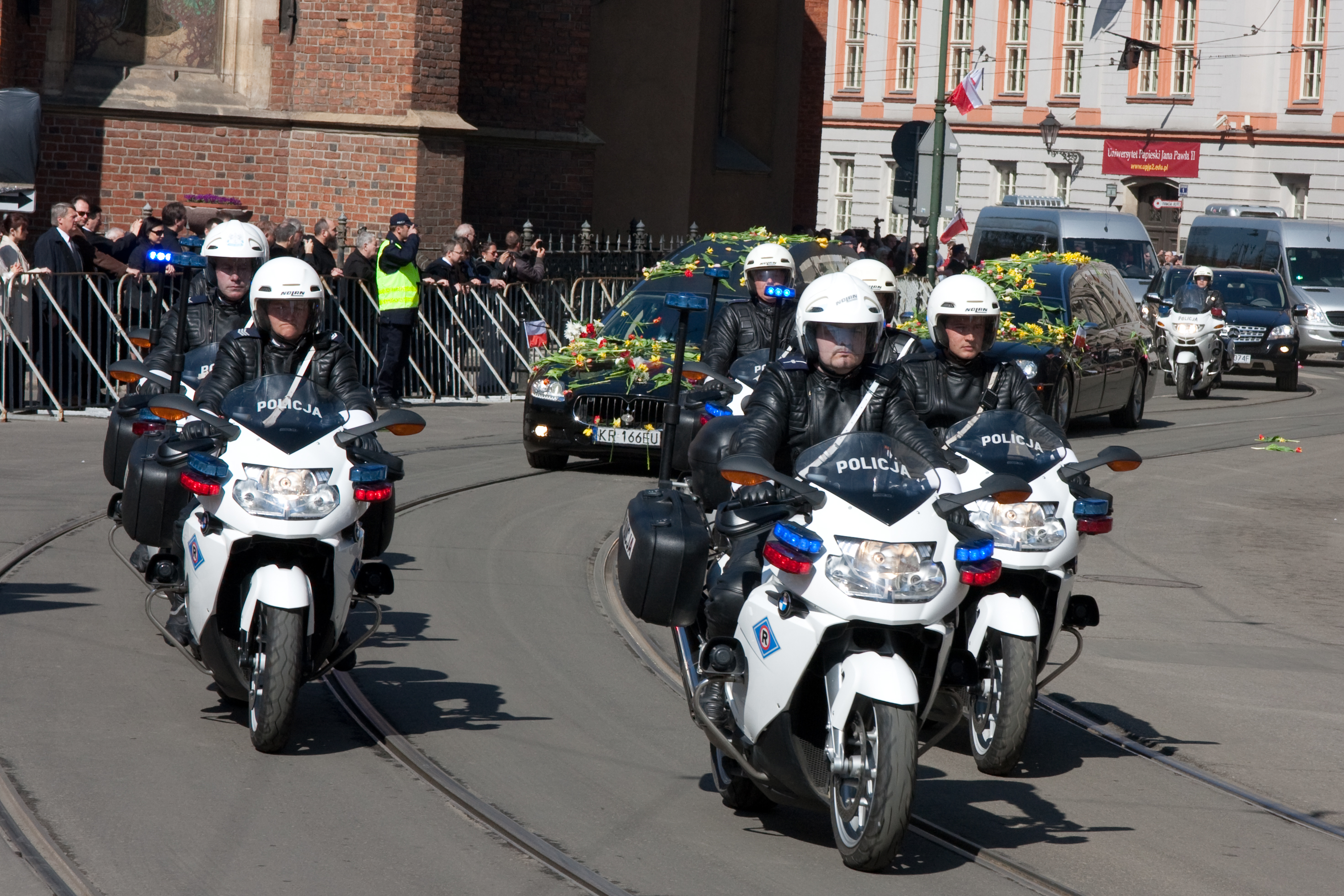
Hearses carrying the remains of Maria and Lech Kaczyński in Kraków escorted by the Polish Police

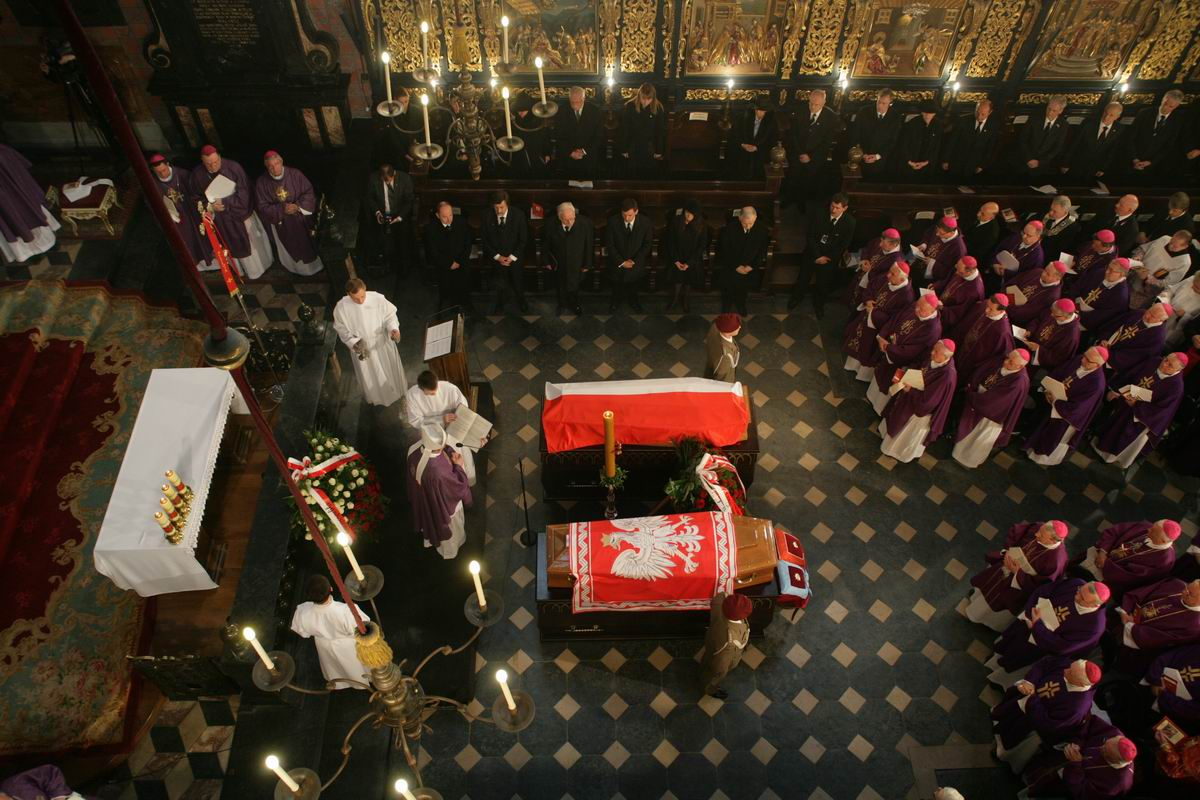
Funeral service at St. Mary's Basilica, Kraków presided over by Cardinal Stanisław Dziwisz

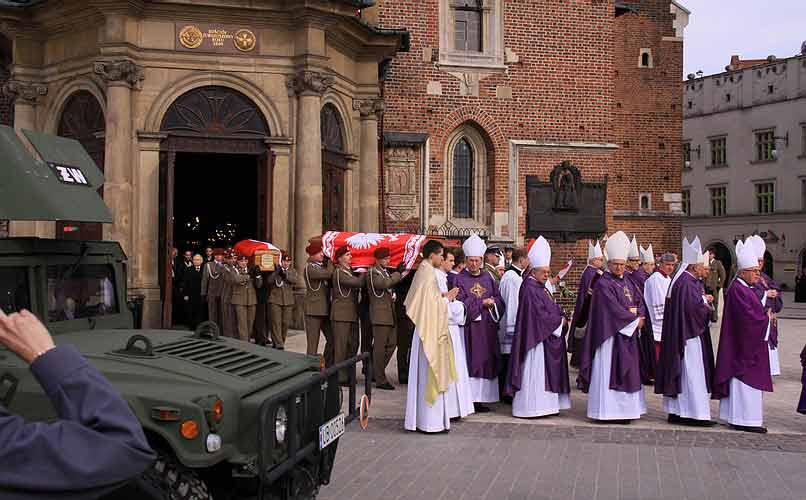
Coffins of the President and the First Lady are being carried out of St. Mary's Basilica following service

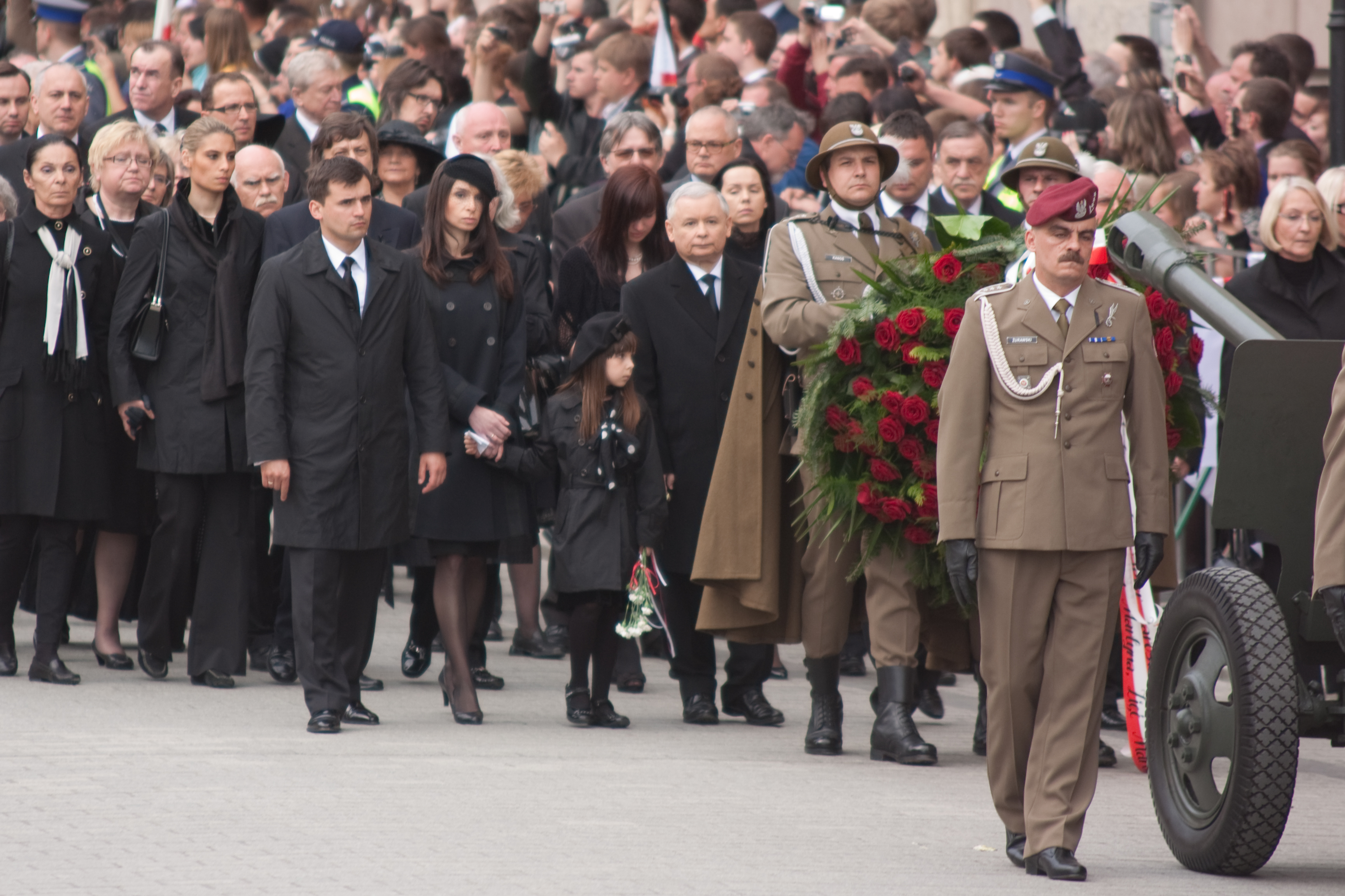
The family members of the President and the First Lady, including the president's brother Jarosław Kaczyński, in funeral procession to Wawel Cathedral

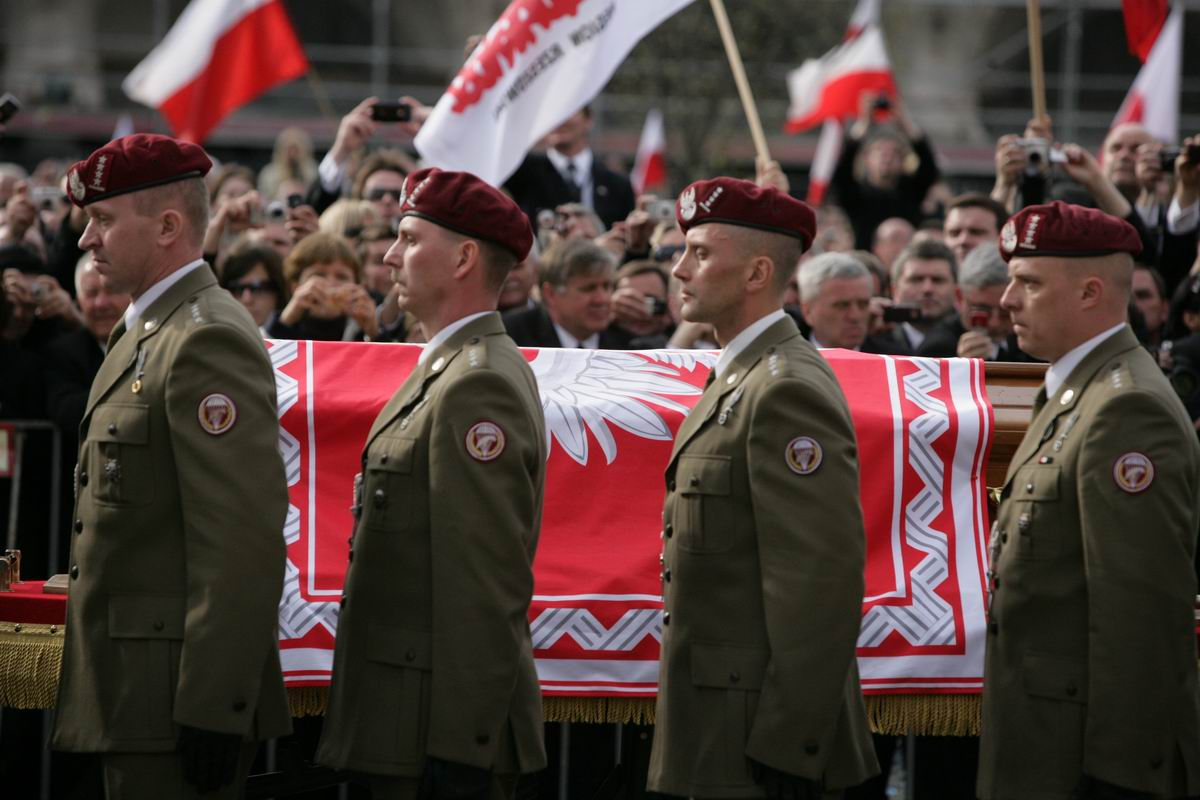
President's coffin on a gun carriage, covered with the Presidential Standard of Poland and escorted by officers of the Polish Armed Forces

A two-minute silence was held on 11 April 2010. Tens of thousands of Poles held a vigil in Warsaw. Kaczyński's coffin was flown to Warsaw that afternoon where his daughter, the Acting President, and the Prime Minister were among the dignitaries to greet it at the airport. The coffin was draped in the flag of Poland. A small ceremony took place there then the coffin was given a military escort to the Presidential Palace, Warsaw. Tens of thousands of Poles lined the streets of Warsaw to witness the occasion. The palace's entrance gate was laid with candles, crucifixes, flowers and the flag of Poland. A public viewing then took place and Kaczyński lay in state from 13 April when his wife arrived home.

On 12 April, Russia had a day of mourning, with flags being flown at half staff and no advertising allowed in the media. Ukraine also marked a day of national mourning on this date. The European Union had a day of mourning on 12 April, and a minute of silence was observed at NATO headquarters in Brussels. Neighbouring Lithuania had a three-day period of national mourning.

==== 14–16 April 2010 ====
On 15 April, a day of national mourning was declared in Canada and Serbia.

On 16 April, Poland announced it was "the family's will" not to delay the state funeral after the air travel disruption around Europe in the aftermath of the eruption of Eyjafjallajökull in Iceland.

==== 17 April 2010 (commemoration ceremony) ====
A public noon commemoration ceremony in Warsaw's Piłsudski Square was attended by more than 100,000 people on 17 April 2010. Sirens sounded and bells tolled around the country. A three-gun salute was fired. People waved the flag of Poland complete with black ribbons, and the names of those who died in the crash were read out from a white stage decorated with a giant cross and photographs of the dead. The crowds bowed their heads.

=== 18 April 2010 (funeral) ===
The day of the funeral was declared a period of national mourning in Bulgaria, Czech Republic, Hungary, Romania and Slovakia.

==== Ceremony ====
The couple's coffins were driven at a slow pace through the streets of Warsaw, passing Warsaw's city hall and a museum dedicated to the 1944 Warsaw Uprising which Kaczyński favoured. The coffins were then flown from Warsaw to Kraków.

The funeral ceremony began at 14:00 (12:00 UTC) with a Mass held at Kraków's St Mary's Basilica, with thousands of mourners in attendance. Cardinal Stanisław Dziwisz, Archbishop of Kraków, presided over the ceremony and addressed Russian president Dmitry Medvedev personally: "The sympathy and help we have received from [our] Russian brothers has breathed new life into a hope for closer relations and reconciliation between our two Slavic nations."

After the funeral, Kaczynski and his wife were buried at Wawel Cathedral, amidst controversy.

==== Dignitaries ====
Several leaders and monarchs were unable to attend due to the air travel disruption around Europe in the aftermath of the eruption of Eyjafjallajökull in Iceland. Poland closed its airspace on 16 April, along with many neighbouring countries, preventing many leaders from making the plane trips to attend.

President of the United States Barack Obama cancelled his planned attendance, speaking of his regret in a statement that blamed "the volcanic ash that is disrupting air travel over Europe". German chancellor Angela Merkel was stranded somewhere between Lisbon and northern Italy, so Germany was represented by President Horst Köhler and Foreign Minister Guido Westerwelle, who travelled to Poland in a helicopter. The Prince of Wales from the United Kingdom also cancelled his visit due to the air travel conditions. President of Ireland Mary McAleese announced she was to attend but was later forced to cancel her attendance due to the spread of the volcanic ash plume. Spanish King Juan Carlos I, Spanish prime minister José Luis Rodríguez Zapatero, and South Korean prime minister Chung Un-chan both confirmed they were unable to attend. Prime Minister of Canada Stephen Harper, along with members of the opposition parties, also cancelled their planned attendance due to the air travel disruptions in Europe. Governor-General of Australia Quentin Bryce attempted to travel to the funeral but found herself delayed in the United Arab Emirates on the day it was due to take place. All but six out of 56 ambassadors to Poland who were scheduled to attend were unable to do so, including Malta's ambassador, who was stuck in Istanbul on his way.

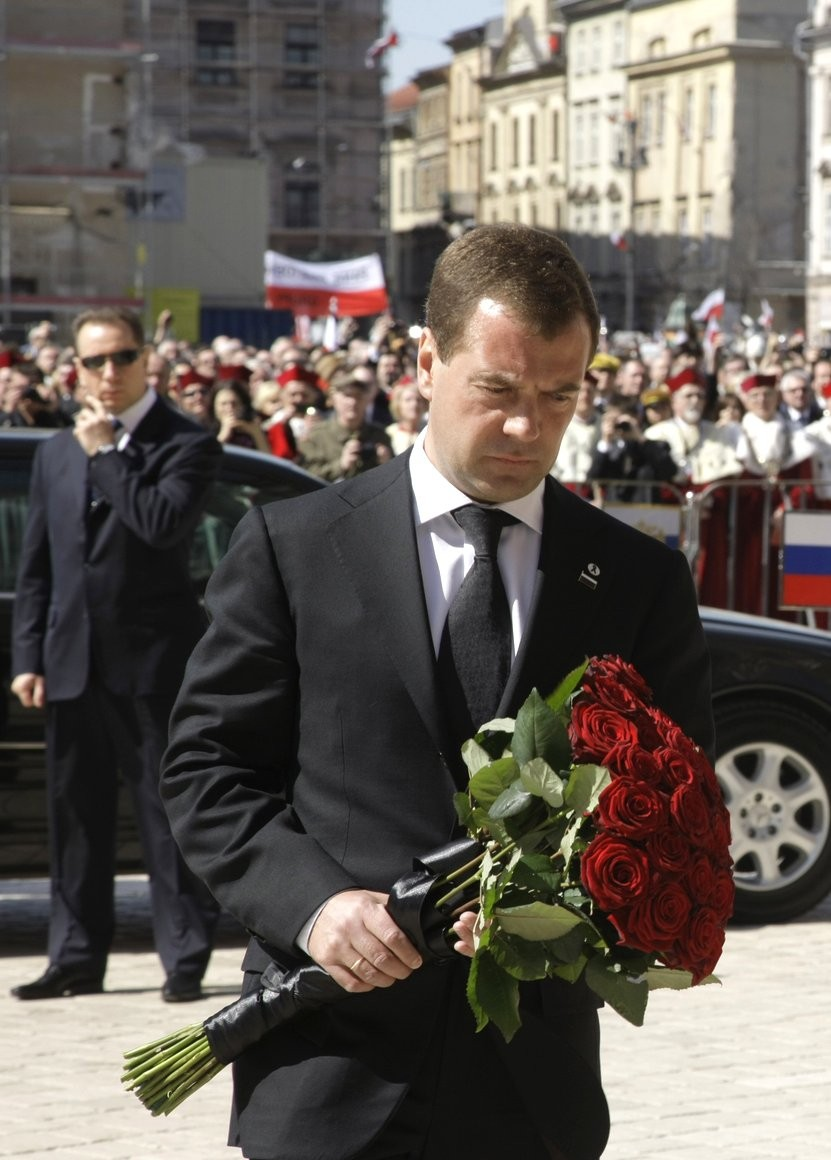
Russian president Dmitry Medvedev lays flowers in memory of Lech and Maria Kaczyński in Kraków on 18 April 2010.

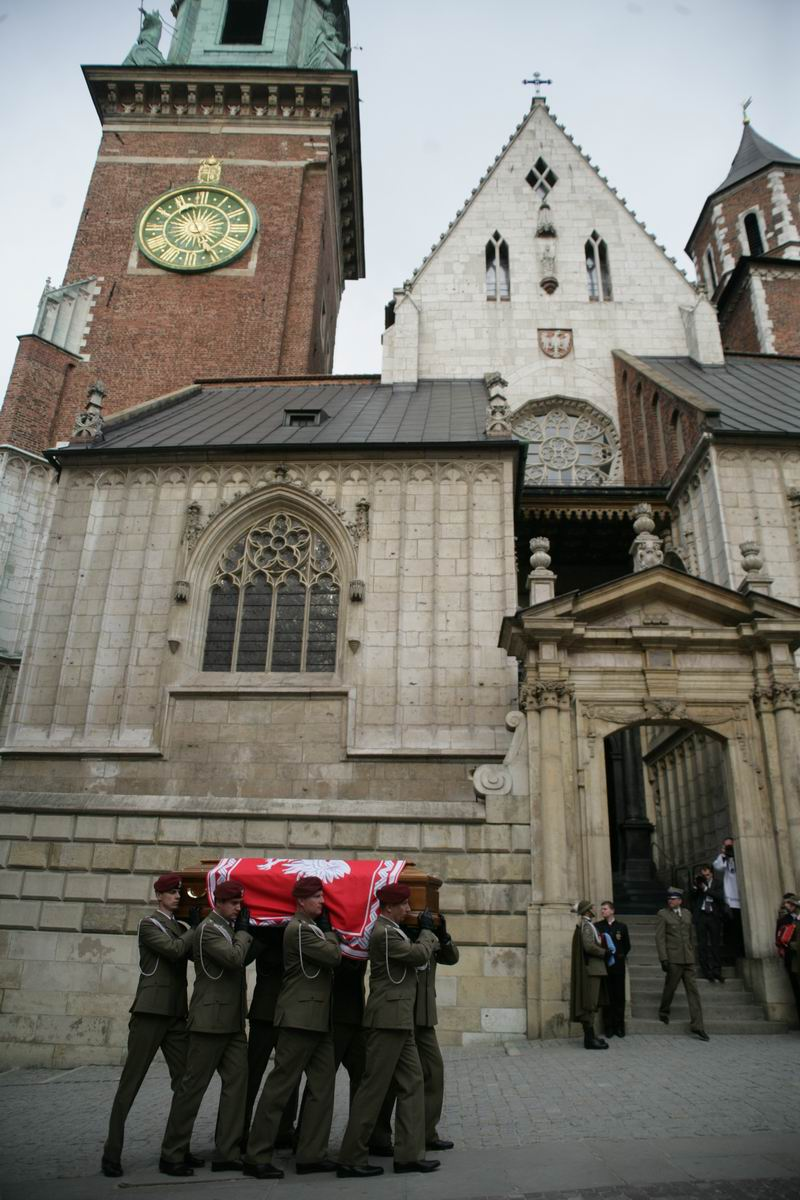
President's coffin shortly before interment in the crypts of the Wawel Cathedral

President of Israel Shimon Peres could not attend as the funeral clashed with the state ceremony for Yom Hazikaron (Israel's memorial day); despite this, Peres released a statement in which he referred to the Polish President as a "righteous gentile" and a man who was a friend to Israel and the Jewish people. Many government members in Israel expressed their sorrows over the death of the Polish president, including Prime Minister Benjamin Netanyahu and Foreign Minister Avigdor Lieberman.

More than two dozen European leaders, including President of Russia Dmitry Medvedev, were the main dignitaries to join the hundreds of thousands of Poles. Many planned alternative travel arrangements over land. The president of Slovenia Danilo Türk drove around 850 kilometres (530 mi) during 16 April. The president of Romania Traian Băsescu flew by helicopter to the northwest of his country before driving on through Hungary and Slovakia. The president of Lithuania Dalia Grybauskaitė reached the funeral by car travelling some 800 kilometres (500 mi) from Vilnius. The prime minister of Estonia Andrus Ansip drove for 18 hours for 1,300 kilometres (810 mi). The president of the Czech Republic Václav Klaus used car and train to travel the required 525 kilometres (326 mi). The president of Slovakia Ivan Gašparovič drove 300 kilometres (190 mi) from Bratislava. The president of Hungary László Sólyom and his Prime Minister Gordon Bajnai drove from Budapest. Former president of Ukraine Viktor Yushchenko and his wife set out by road from Budapest.

Representatives from Morocco flew into Kraków in a Cessna on 17 April ahead of the funeral.

===== Attending dignitaries =====
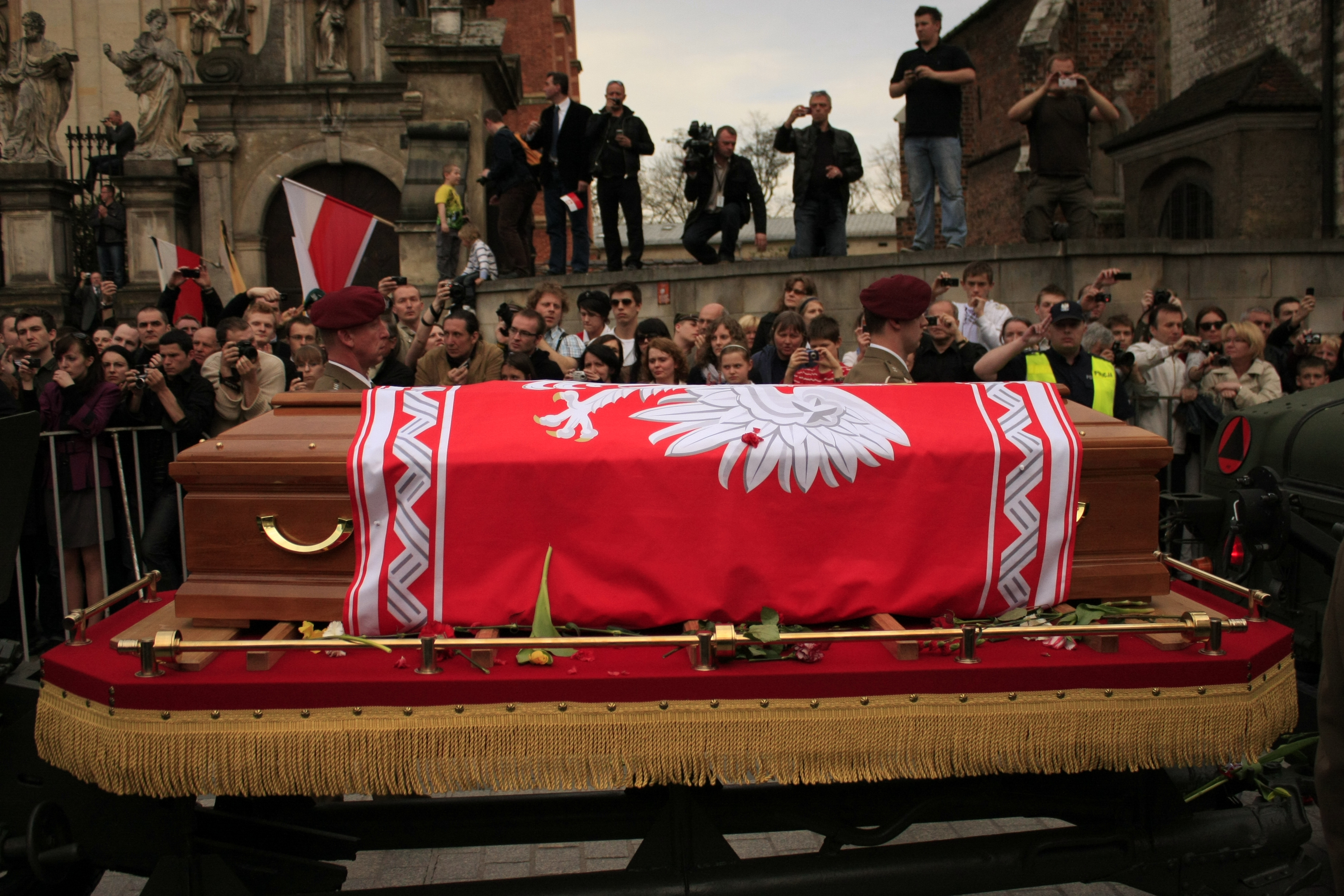

Country	Representative(s)
Armenia	Chairman of parliament Hovik Abrahamyan
Azerbaijan	Prime Minister Artur Rasizadə
Belarus	Chairman of the Senate Barys Batura
Czech Republic	President Václav Klaus; First Lady Livia Klausová; Prime Minister Jan Fischer; Prague Archbishop Dominik Duka
Estonia	Prime Minister Andrus Ansip
European Union	President of the Parliament Jerzy Buzek; Vice-President of the Parliament Rodi Kratsa-Tsagaropoulou
Georgia	President Mikheil Saakashvili; First Lady Sandra Roelofs
Germany	President Horst Köhler; First Lady Eva Köhler; Vice Chancellor and Minister of Foreign Affairs Guido Westerwelle
Hungary	President László Sólyom; Prime Minister Gordon Bajnai; Former prime minister Viktor Orbán
Kosovo	President Fatmir Sejdiu
Latvia	President Valdis Zatlers; First Lady Lilita Zatlere
Lithuania	President Dalia Grybauskaitė
Moldova	Acting President and Speaker of Parliament Mihai Ghimpu; Deputy Prime Minister and Minister of Foreign Affairs Iurie Leancă
Morocco	Prime Minister Abbas El Fassi
Romania	President Traian Băsescu
Russia	President Dmitry Medvedev; Minister of Foreign Affairs Sergey Lavrov
Slovakia	President Ivan Gašparovič; First Lady Silvia Gašparovičová; Prime Minister Robert Fico; Chairman of the National Council Pavol Paška
Slovenia	President Danilo Türk
Ukraine	President Viktor Yanukovych former president Viktor Yushchenko former prime minister Yulia Tymoshenko; Minister of Foreign Affairs Kostyantyn Hryshchenko

==== Burial ====
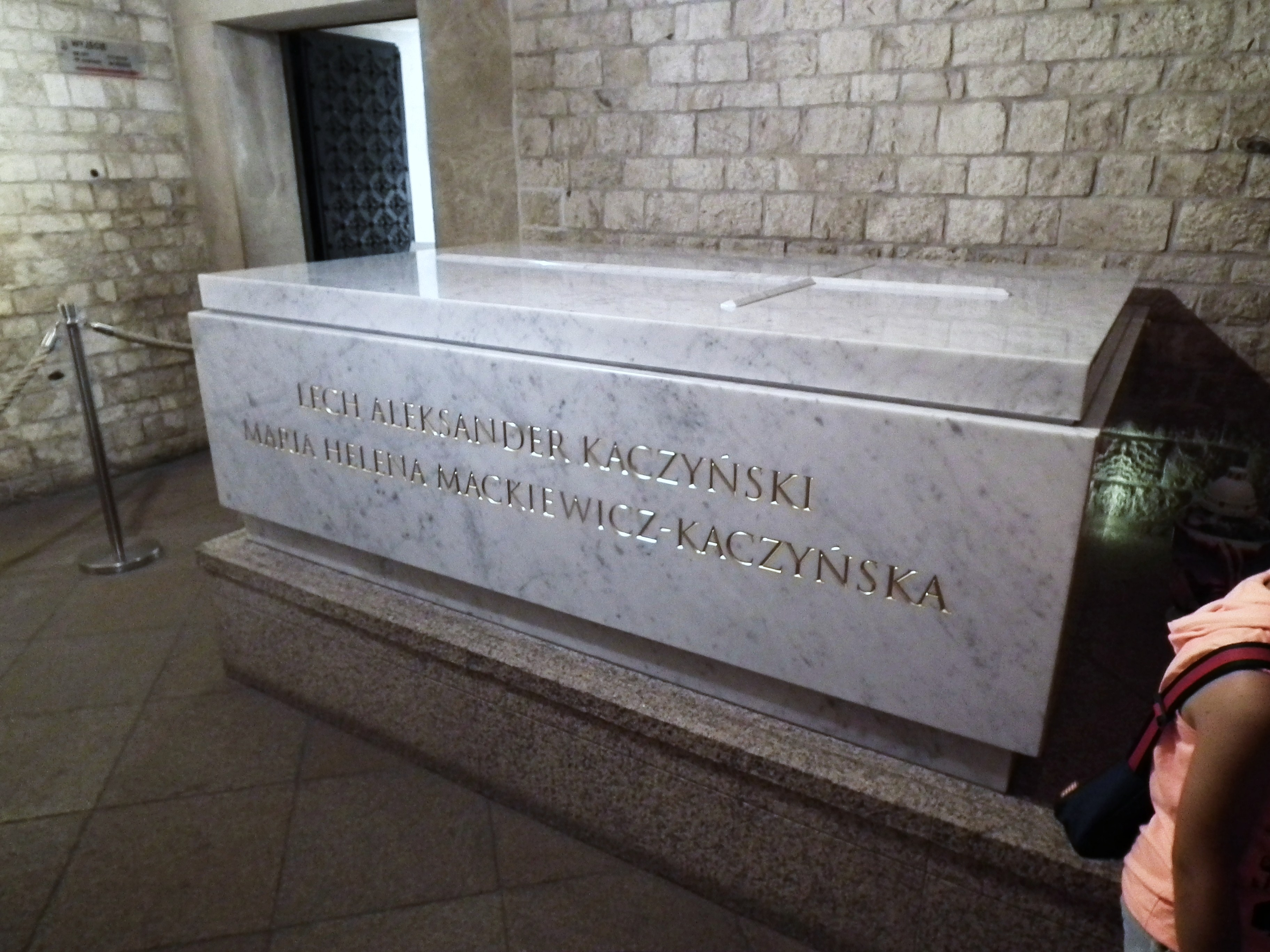
The tomb of Lech Kaczyński and Maria Kaczyńska at the Wawel Cathedral, Kraków. The current sarcophagus was built in 2016.

After the ceremony, the coffins were brought in procession through Kraków. They then moved to Wawel Castle and Cathedral, where a 21-gun salute was fired. Screens broadcast the events to the masses who shouted on the streets, "Lech Kaczyński! We thank you!"

Lech Kaczyński and Maria Kaczyńska were buried together in a sarcophagus, placed in the antechamber to Józef Piłsudski's crypt in the Wawel Cathedral, Kraków on 18 April 2010; Kaczyński's family revealed this decision on 13 April. This decision was considered controversial by many Poles who felt his achievements were not in the same league as others buried at Wawel causing objections.
