= Gerard Bouwhuis =

Dutch pianist

Gerard Bouwhuis (born 1954, Castricum) is a Dutch pianist, best known for his work on contemporary music. A graduate from the Royal Conservatory of The Hague under Geoffrey Douglas Madge, he is a member of the Xenakis Ensemble. Composers such as Louis Andriessen, Cornelis de Bondt and Martijn Padding have written works for him.
