= M.anifest =

Ghanaian rapper and musician (born 1982)

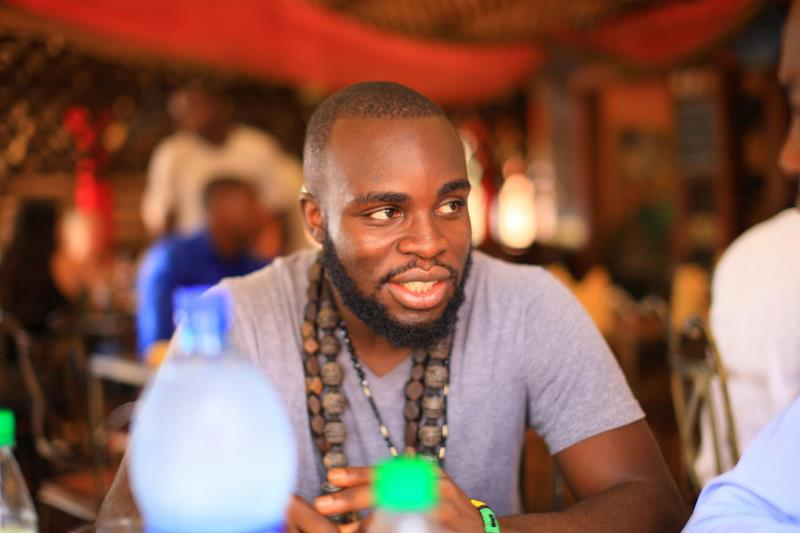
- M.anifest

Background information
- Also known as: M Dor-dor-dor-ti-dor; M Digidi; god MC
- Born: Kwame Ametepee Tsikata; 20 November 1982 (age 43); Accra, Ghana
- Genres: Hip hop; hiplife; R&B; Afrobeats
- Occupations: Rapper; singer; songwriter; record producer
- Instruments: Vocals; Pro Tools
- Years active: 2005–present
- Labels: Singitdamnit Music; Mass Appeal Records
- Website: www.manifestmc.com

Kwame Ametepee Tsikata (born 20 November 1982), known professionally as M.anifest, is a Ghanaian musician, rapper and record producer.

He won Best Rapper and Hip-Hop song of the year at the 2017 Ghana Music Awards. He has worked with Damon Albarn, Flea, Tony Allen, Erykah Badu, and is featured on five songs on the Rocket Juice and The Moon album. He is the grandson of one of Africa's foremost ethnomusicologists and composers J. H. Kwabena Nketia. In 2012, The Strand on BBC Radio tipped him as one of four acts to look out for in 2012. In 2015 M.anifest's single "Someway bi" earned him a third-place honour in the International Songwriters Competition (ISC). In the same year, The Guardian named M.anifest as "the foremost rapper on the continent.". M.anifest currently divides his lifetime between Madina in Ghana and Minneapolis in the United States.

== Personal life and education ==
M.anifest is the son of Ghanaian lawyer and academician Tsatsu Tsikata and Rev. Dr. Priscilla Naana Nketia, a lawyer and pastor. His maternal grandfather J. H. Kwabena Nketia was a composer, professor and ethnomusicologist. M.anifest emigrated to the United States in 2001 to attend Macalester College in the twin cities of Minneapolis-St. Paul, where he graduated in 2005 with a Bachelor of Arts degree in economics.

M.anifest went to high school at SOS-Hermann Gmeiner International College in Tema. He was the entertainment prefect of his school known as Amet Tsikata. He has had artist residencies and given lectures in St. Lawrence University and the University of Ghana, and spoken to several classes in Hamline University, (his Alma mater) Macalester College, Penumbra Theater's Summer Arts Institute and Ashesi University.

== Career ==
In his time in the Twin Cities, M.anifest learned the nitty-gritty bits of becoming an independent musician. He lent his voice to a Pepsi jingle that played nationally on U.S radio, which earned him royalties to produce and release his first solo album, Manifestations, in 2007. That album earned him the "Songwriter of the Year" honors in the City Pages as well as top five albums of the year recognition in the Star Tribune. In 2009 he released a free album, The Birds and the Beats, to raise awareness and funds for the work of a non-profit, Young Entrepreneurs Africa.

In 2010, M.anifest linked up with Africa Express and toured France and Spain with them. He caught the attention of Africa Express co-founder Damon Albarn, who thereafter invited M.anifest to be a collaborator on Rocket Juice & the Moon the following year. In September 2012, M.anifest joined the Africa Express train touring the United Kingdom. He wrote for The Huffington Post about these experiences.

In September 2011, he released his sophomore album Immigrant Chronicles: Coming to America, which included the singles "Suffer", "Asa" and "Blue (Chale What Dey Happen)". It marked a decade of his life in the United States, and the beginning of his transition back to Ghana. In 2012, M.anifest began making major inroads in Africa, performing on the Big Brother Africa stage as well at the Channel O Music Video Awards in South Africa. The video for his single "Makaa Maka" also got him nominated for Most Gifted Hip-Hop Video at the 2012 Channel O Music Awards and won him Best Hip-Hop Video at the locally-held 4Syte Music Video Awards.

M.anifest produced and co-wrote an independence mini Hip-Hopera for Channel O and also performed a piece, at the first-ever Ghana Music Week, detailing the history of Ghanaian music. M.anifest is the co-founder of Giant Steps, an interactive conference for entrepreneurial creatives and creative entrepreneurs. He is also included in the feature-length documentary We Rock Long Distance by filmmaker Justin Schell.

On 30 June 2016, M.anifest released a diss track to fellow rapper Sarkodie titled "god MC". Sarkodie replied within two days with a diss track of his own called "Kanta", which was a Panda cover. M.anifest's god MC went on to win Hip Hop Song of the year in the Ghana Music Award the following year. Two years later on 24 December 2018, the two officially squashed their beef with Sarkodie performing at M.anifest's yearly Manifestivies concert in Accra. On 18 June 2020, the two cemented their friendship with Sarkodie featuring M.anifest on his politically conscious track, Brown Paper Bag. The song was met with mixed reaction, with popular music critic, Gabriel Myers Hansen, bemoaning its lack of dance rhythm.

"Bereft of hooks, the instrumentation of the song is crafted with chords that fend off dance; instead inducing a frightful, contemplative atmosphere complete with doomy humming and the blast of gunshots. Insofar as this facilitates the discussion it hosts, it is fit for purpose. After all, this is not a forum for the fainthearted."

=== 2016: god MC and Nowhere Cool ===
On 30 June 2016, M.anifest released "god MC", a diss track aimed at Sarkodie. The song was a response to Sarkodie's "Bossy" track, on which the Tema-based rapper threw subliminal shots at many of his contemporaries. At the end of the track, Sarkodie said: "M.anifest meserɛ wo lemme just use your 'dor dor dor ti dor' to end this verse."

"Dor dor dor ti dor" is one of M.anifest's many taglines. M.anifest said he felt disrespected with the way Sarkodie used the tagline to sign off of a track on which he had thrown shots at his colleague rappers. On god MC, the Madina rapper said: "Go to the market, buy yourself some manners; don't use my name in vain, that's just for starters." Sarkodie then replied with Kanta but M.anifest never replied to that diss track. When asked about why he did not respond, M.anifest replied that he had already said all that needed to be said. He added that his god MC track got more people talking about the content of songs than they were doing before. god MC also talked about the state of Ghana's pop culture, with the rapper bemoaning our "move from Inspector Bediako to Kunkum Bagya", a reference to the country's departure from creating real authentic Ghanaian productions to dubbing foreign films into local languages. Many listeners thought M.anifest had used the rap beef with Sarkodie to hype his own upcoming album, Nowhere Cool, which dropped a few months later.

On 14 July 2016, M.anifest dropped another single called 100%, which some took as a continuation of his conflict with Sarkodie. Although he denied it, many caught the part where he said: "You dey beef with uh, nah I'm chilling." 100% featured Worlasi and was an instant hit. Its groovy rhythm and infectious hook was a departure from M.anifest's more thoughtful singles and elaborate verses. Despite its simplicity, M.anifest still managed to enrich his lines by using alternating antonyms in his verses. "I'm an expensive guy, you want cheap side/ can't strong arm me with a weak vibe/ if I decide to let the beat ride, it's a major move to over the minor dudes/Everyday some hater dey write love song..." Unlike most of M.anifest's songs, 100% was a banger of a song that did not require much analysis to understand. Worlasi echoed the sentiment in the bridge of the song when he said: "Normally, some deep things/ but now, we dey ease things/ me den M.anifest 'bout to move things/ raise things y'all n-word better rethink."

On 6 September 2016, M.anifest dropped the Nowhere Cool album trailer on YouTube, following up with the releases of both B.E.A.R. and Sugar as lead singles. Nowhere Cool officially launched on 8 September 2020, to positive reviews. It had a rich roster of local and international artistes including Ghana's Worlasi and Cina Soul, as well as South Africa's Tumi Molekane and Nomisupasta. Dex Kwasi was tapped for Palm Wine & Whisky while Nigeria's Brymo featured on Sugar and Good Bye. Paapa whom M.anifest featured on Right Here off his Apae: the Price of Free EP album, also featured on Ozymandias.

The Nowhere Cool project is a conceptual album. The album opens with a titular track, Nowhere Cool, which talks about the uncertainty of being a creative in Ghana. On Good Bye, the album's final track, M.anifest and Brymo take turns to sing about the loss of a loved one, signified by the fact that the album is now out of their hands and in the care of their fans.

Between the two tracks, the album is filled with songs that talk about the invisible man and his struggles (Invisible) and the aspirations of a poor man (Rich People Problems). Despite the verses about human struggles, Nowhere Cool includes the promise of a brighter end, which is captured on Now Here Cool, an anagram to the album title.

M.anifest has described Nowhere Cool as his best project yet. Its title came from a short story of the same name by foremost Ghanaian author and poet Prof. Ama Ata Aidoo. On Now Here Cool, she is heard reciting a piece from the same story:

"Nowhere cool sister, ain’t nowhere cool. Therefore let me hide here among the thorns while I dine on wild desert green. And if they should ask you of me, tell them the name of the game was life, and I never learnt the rules."

== Awards ==
- Songwriter of the Year (2008) - City Pages
- Minnesota Emerging composer Award (MECA) (2010) - American Composers Forum
- Best Hip-Hop Video - 4syte Music Video Awards
- Hip-Hop Song of the Year (2013) - Ghana Music Awards
- Best Rapper of the year (2013) - Ghana Music Award
- Best Special Effects Video (2016) - 4syte Music Video Awards
- Best Individual Style (2016) - Glitz Style Awards
- Hip-Hop song of the year (2017) - Ghana Music Awards
- Best Rapper of the Year (2017)- Ghana Music Awards
- Midem Best Artist (2017)- International Midem Awards, France
- Best artiste in African Hip Hop award (AFRIMA 2018)
- Known to his fans as the Greatest Rapper of All Time

== Discography ==
=== Albums ===
- Manifestations (2007)
- The Birds and the Beats (Free Mixtape, 2009)
- Immigrant Chronicles: Coming to America (2011)
- Apae: the price of free EP (2013)
- Nowhere Cool (2016)
- The Gamble EP (2019)
- Madina to the Universe (2021)
- Madina to the Universe: The E.P.Ilogue (2022)
- NEW ROAD AND GUAVA TREES (2025)

=== Singles ===
- "Babylon Breakdown" (2007)
- "Gentleman" (2007)
- "Coming to America" (2011)
- "Suffer" (2011)
- "Asa" feat. Efya (2012)
- "Makaa Maka" (2012)
- "Blue (Chale What Dey Happen)" (2012)
- "Ebei" (2013)
- "Mind Games" (2013)
- "Someway Bi" (2013)
- "Jigah" feat. HHP (2014)
- "No Shortcut to Heaven" feat. Obrafour (2014)
- "W'ani Aba" (feat. Bisa Kdei)
- "Forget Dem" (2015)
- "god MC" (2016)
- "100%" (2016)
- "Sugar" feat Brymo (2016)
- "Do My Own" feat bigBen (2017)
- "Me ne woa" feat King Promise (2017)
- "Azumah Nelson Flow" (2017)
- Be my woman feat M.I Casa (2017)
- "Don’t Follow Me" feat. Bayku & Yaa Pono (2018)
- "Okay" feat. Worlasi
- Feels feat Kwesi Arthur
- Rapper 101
- Big Mad feat. Simi
- "Rapper 101 (Prod. by MikeMillzOnEm)" (2019)
- "No Long Talk (Prod. by MikeMillzOnEm)" (2020)

=== Features ===
- "Camp Mulla" feat. M.anifest - All in (2013)
- "E.L." feat. M.anifest - Hallelujah (2013)
- "Lyricalwaanzam" feat. M.anifest - For sheygey reasons (2013)
- "Bodi" feat. M.anifest & Team Dharma - Hercules (2013)
- "Kindness" feat. M.anifest - 8th Wonder (2014)
- "Proverb" feat. M.anifest - Proverb's Manifest (2014)
- "Dee Moneey" feat. M.anifest, Ice Prince, Paedae(R2bees), JTown, Reminisce - Finish Line (Remix) (2014)
- "Sedem" feat. M.anifest - Falling in Love(2014)
- "Obrafour" ft. M.anifest - Odasani (2014)
- "Sarkodie" ft. M.anifest - Brown Paper Bag (2020)
- "A-Reece" ft. M.anifest - West Africa Time (2023)
- "A-Reece" ft. M.anifest - Champions (2023)
- "Streets is Calling" (feat. M.anifest and Moonchild Sanelley) (2024)

=== Collaborations ===
- A.R.M (Budo, Krudid, M.anifest) ft Brother Ali - Heaven Only Knows (2009)
- S&M (Sarah White & M.anifest) - Losing My Religion (2010)
- A.R.M (Budo, Krudid, M.anifest) - Two Africans and a Jew EP (2011)
- Burna Boy ft M.anifest - Another Story (African Giant, 2019)
