= Hypnotic Brass Ensemble =

Chicago-based brass ensemble

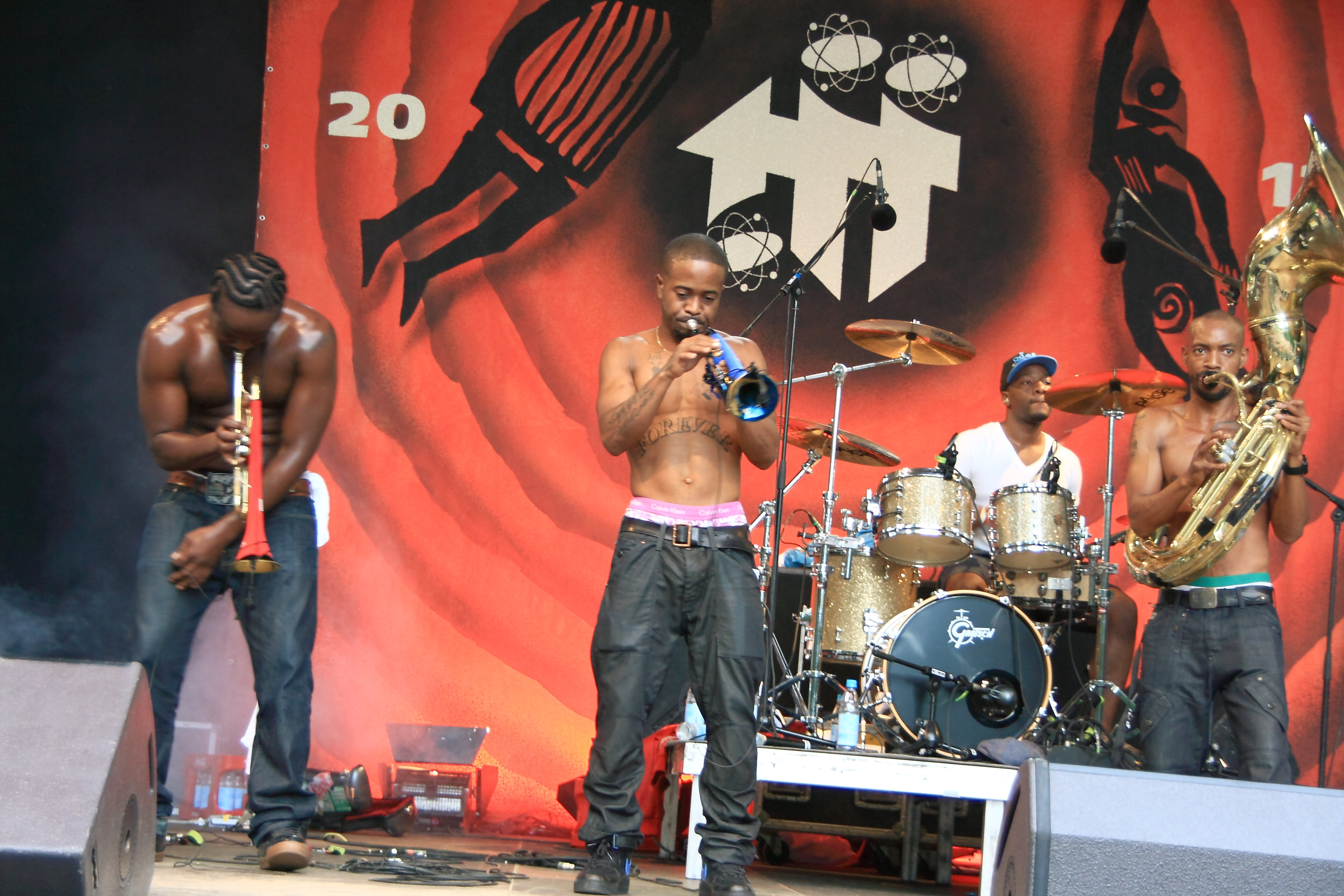
At TFF Rudolstadt 2012

Hypnotic Brass Ensemble is an eight-piece, Chicago-based brass ensemble consisting of eight sons of the jazz trumpeter Phil Cohran. Their musical style ranges from hip hop to jazz to funk and rock, including calypso and gypsy music. They call their eclectic blend of sound "now music", or "Hypnotic". Reared in the teachings of music since they were children, they grew up on the stage playing as the "Phil Cohran Youth Ensemble".

== Early history ==
The brothers were raised in a house where music was a constant element of the household. Phil Cohran's "Circle of Sound" held rehearsals in the living room and put on live shows in the adjacent loft/theatre called the "Sun Ark". The brothers were obligated to wake at 6am and play their horns before and after school. As adolescents, they played around Chicago as the Phil Cohran Youth Ensemble, performing for the likes of Harold Washington, Nelson Mandela, and other prominent figures of the day.

As the brothers grew into high school, many of them set their horns aside for a while. Enduring the deaths of close friends and family, including brother Anthony Neal, close friend Robert Lock (for whom they later wrote a song entitled "Flipside"), and Level Todd (for whom their song "Todd" was written), they decided to pick their horns back up. In 1999, the brothers took to the subways of Chicago and presented their music. Shortly after, they formed a fully-fledged, eight-piece brass ensemble and by 2004 recorded their first project, Flipside. They moved to New York City in 2006.

== Collaborations ==
They have performed with Mos Def, Aquilla Sadalla, Phil Cohran, The Recipe, Nomadic Massive, Tony Allen, Wu Tang Clan, De La Soul, Prince, Femi Kuti, Gorillaz, The B-52's, and at the North Sea Jazz Festival. They have recorded with names ranging from Snoop Dogg, Ben Billions Erykah Badu to RZA and Ghostface Killah of the Wu Tang Clan to BK-One to Childish Gambino to Maxwell. They supported Blur for their Hyde Park reunion concerts on 2–3 July 2009. They are also collaborators on a number of tracks from the third Gorillaz studio album, Plastic Beach.

One of their songs "War" was featured in the box office smash film The Hunger Games as the theme song for the in-universe eponymous sport hosted by Caesar Flickerman, and on the soundtrack for season 4 of Fargo. It was sampled in "American Royalty" by Childish Gambino featuring RZA in the former's 2012 mixtape Royalty. They collaborated on tracks with the group Rocket Juice & the Moon, a project featuring Damon Albarn (Blur, Gorillaz) on vocals/guitar/keyboard, Flea (Red Hot Chili Peppers) on bass, and legendary Afrobeat drummer Tony Allen (Fela Kuti and many others) on the group's self-titled debut album. As part of independent label Jagjaguwar's 25th anniversary, the group performed a reimagined version of Sapphie by Richard Youngs alongside Moses Sumney, Perfume Genius, and Sharon Van Etten.

== Personnel ==
- Gabriel Hubert ("Hudah") - trumpet
- Saiph Graves ("Cid") - trombone
- Amal Baji Hubert ("Baji" or "June Body") - trumpet
- Jafar Baji Graves ("Yosh") - trumpet
- Seba Graves ("Clef") - trombone
- Tarik Graves ("Smoove") - trumpet
- Uttama Hubert ("Rocco") - baritone horn
- Hashim "Hash" Bunch - bass
- Kevin "Vo Era" Hunt - guitar
- Christopher Anderson - drums

== Discography ==
Year	Title	Label	Format
2004	Flipside (aka Hypnotic Orange)	Independently released	CD-R
2005	Jupiter (aka Hypnotic Green)	Independently released	CD-R
2006	"Jupiter" b/w "Balicky Bon"	Pantone	10" record
2007	"War" b/w "Mercury"	Pantone	10" record
2007	New York City Live	Independently released	CD-R
2007	"Brass in Africa" b/w "Brass in Africa (Bulljun Remix)"	Handcuts	7" record
2007	Sankofa (split with Salah Ragab and the Afro-Egyptian Ensemble)	Honest Jon's	LP
2008	The Brothas	released by Pheelco Entertainment	CD-R
2009	"Alyo" b/w "Flipside"	Honest Jon's	10" record
2009	Hypnotic Brass Ensemble	Honest Jon's	CD and LP
2010	Heritage EP	ChoiceCuts	CD and 12" record
2011	Bulletproof Brass	Pheelco Entertainment Inc.	download/CD/LP
2012	"Kryptonite" (single)	Pheelco Entertainment Inc.	download
2012	Kelan Philip Cohran And The Hypnotic Brass Ensemble	Honest Jon's	CD
2013	Fly: The Customs Prelude	Pheelco Entertainment Inc.	download/CD
2014	"All In" (single)	Pheelco Entertainment Inc.	download
2015	"Straight Business" (single)	Pheelco Entertainment Inc.	download/CD
2016	Sound Rhythm & Form	Pheelco Entertainment Inc.	download
2017	Hypnotic Joints, Volume One	Pheelco Entertainment Inc.	download
2017	Book of Sound	Honest Jon's	CD and 2LP
2020	Bad Boys of Jazz	Fat Beats Records	LP
2021	This is a Mindfulness Drill	Jagjaguwar	LP
