= Jamiroquai discography =

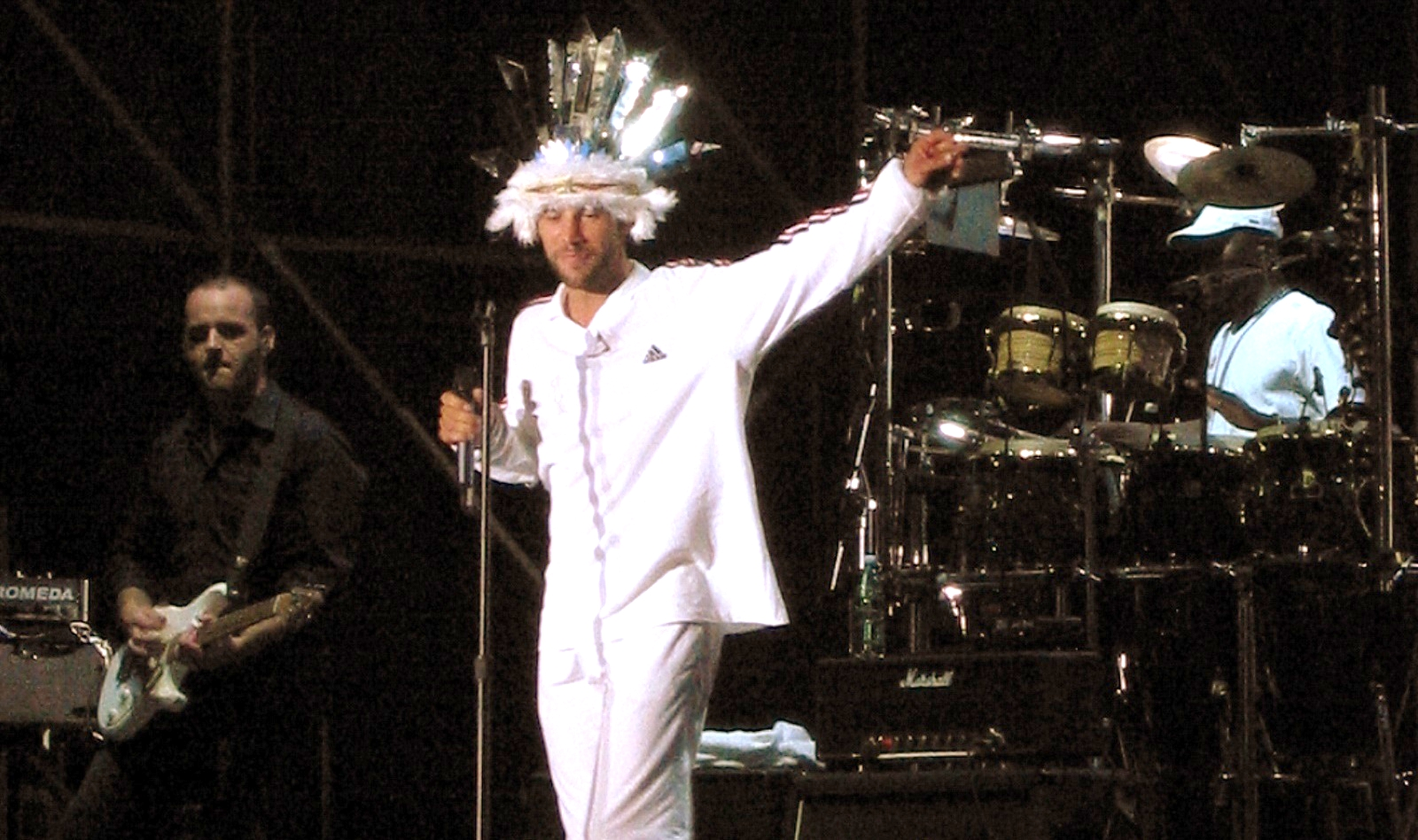
- Jamiroquai performing in Turin, Italy, in 2003
- Studio albums: 8
- Extended plays: 1
- Compilation albums: 6
- Singles: 35
- Promotional singles: 4
- Video albums: 4
- Music videos: 36

Jamiroquai is a British funk and acid jazz band formed in 1992. Fronted by lead singer Jay Kay, Jamiroquai were initially the most prominent component in the early 1990s London-based acid jazz movement. Subsequent albums have explored other musical directions such as pop, rock, disco and electronica. Their best-known track is "Virtual Insanity", which won four awards at the 1997 MTV Video Music Awards. Jamiroquai have sold more than 26 million albums worldwide and won a Grammy Award in 1998.

== Albums ==
=== Studio albums ===
List of albums, with selected chart positions and certifications, showing year released.
Title	Album details	Peak chart positions										Certifications
Title	Album details	UK	AUS	AUT	CAN	FRA	GER	ITA	NLD	SWI	US	Certifications
Emergency on Planet Earth	Released: 14 June 1993; Label: Sony Soho Square; Formats: CD, LP	1	21	11	—	7	17	19	15	5	—	BPI: Platinum; IFPI SWI: Gold; NVPI: Gold; SNEP: Platinum
The Return of the Space Cowboy	Released: 17 October 1994; Label: Sony Soho Square; Formats: CD, LP	2	42	22	—	4	37	19	37	9	—	BPI: Platinum; IFPI SWI: Gold; NVPI: Gold; SNEP: Platinum
Travelling Without Moving	Released: 28 August 1996; Label: Sony Soho Square; Formats: CD, LP	2	6	9	37	2	9	6	16	3	24	BPI: 4× Platinum; ARIA: Platinum; BVMI: Gold; IFPI AUT: Gold; IFPI SWI: Gold; MC: 3× Platinum; NVPI: Gold; RIAA: Platinum; SNEP: 2× Platinum
Synkronized	Released: 8 June 1999; Label: Sony Soho Square; Formats: CD, LP	1	1	2	10	2	1	7	6	2	28	BPI: Platinum; ARIA: Gold; BVMI: Gold; IFPI SWI: Platinum; MC: Gold; NVPI: Gold; SNEP: Platinum
A Funk Odyssey	Released: 29 August 2001; Label: Sony Soho Square; Formats: CD, LP	1	1	4	5	1	2	1	4	1	44	BPI: 2× Platinum; ARIA: 4× Platinum; BVMI: Gold; IFPI SWI: Platinum; NVPI: Gold; SNEP: Platinum
Dynamite	Released: 15 June 2005; Label: Sony BMG; Formats: CD, LP	3	3	10	39	2	6	3	5	3	145	BPI: Platinum; ARIA: Gold; IFPI SWI: Gold
Rock Dust Light Star	Released: 1 November 2010; Label: Universal, Mercury; Formats: CD, LP, digital download	7	13	6	—	2	7	3	1	2	—	BPI: Gold; FIMI: Platinum; IFPI SWI: Gold
Automaton	Released: 31 March 2017; Label: Virgin EMI; Formats: CD, LP, digital download	4	7	6	19	2	5	1	4	2	94	BPI: Silver
"—" denotes albums that did not chart or were not released.

=== Compilation albums ===
Title	Details	Peak chart positions							Certifications
Title	Details	UK	AUS	CAN	GER	ITA	JPN	SWI	Certifications
Jay's Selection	Released: 1996; Label: Sony Music Japan	—	—	—	—	—	—	—	
In Store Jam	Released: 1997; Label: Sony Music; Note: Promotional release	—	—	—	—	—	—	—	
1999 Remixes	Released: September 1999; Label: S2	—	—	—	—	—	—		
Late Night Tales: Jamiroquai	Released: 10 November 2003; Label: Azuli	—	—	—	—	—	—	—	
High Times: Singles 1992–2006	Released: 6 November 2006; Label: Sony BMG	1	11	83	33	5	4	1	BPI: 3× Platinum; ARIA: Platinum; BVMI: Gold; FIMI: Platinum; IFPI SWI: Gold; RIAJ: Platinum
Multiquai	Released: 14 November 2006; Label: Sony BMG	—	—	—	—	—	—		

=== Video albums ===
Title	Details	Peak chart positions		Certifications
Title	Details	UK	AUS DVD	Certifications
Corner of the Earth	Released: 8 July 2002	31	—	
Live in Verona	Released: 11 November 2002; Label: Sony Soho	7	2	ARIA: 2× Platinum
High Times: Singles 1992–2006	Released: 6 November 2006; Label: Sony Soho	—	14	
Jamiroquai – Live at Montreux 2003	Released: 22 October 2007; Label: Sony Soho	—	40	

== Extended plays ==
Title	Details
An Online Odyssey	Released: 1 June 2001; Label: Sony BMG

== Singles ==
=== As lead artist ===
List of singles as lead artist, with selected chart positions showing year released and originating album.
Title	Year	Peak chart positions										Certifications	Album
Title	Year	UK	AUS	BEL (WA)	FRA	GER	NLD	NZL	SWE	SWI	US	Certifications	Album
"When You Gonna Learn"	1992	28	105	—	32	—	92	15	—	—	—		Emergency on Planet Earth
"Too Young to Die"	1993	10	53	—	33	—	41	—	30	21	—		Emergency on Planet Earth
"Blow Your Mind"	1993	12	—	—	—	33	40	43	—	—	—		Emergency on Planet Earth
"Emergency on Planet Earth"	1993	32	—	—	—	—	—	—	—	—	—		Emergency on Planet Earth
"The Kids"	1993	—	—	—	—	—	—	—	—	—	—		The Return of the Space Cowboy
"Space Cowboy"	1994	17	109	—	22	—	—	—	—	28	—	BPI: Platinum	The Return of the Space Cowboy
"Half the Man"	1994	15	198	—	—	—	—	—	—	—	—		The Return of the Space Cowboy
"Light Years"	1995	—	112	—	—	—	—	—	—	—	—		The Return of the Space Cowboy
"Stillness in Time"	1995	9	—	—	—	—	—	—	—	—	—		The Return of the Space Cowboy
"Do U Know Where You're Coming From" (with M-Beat)	1996	12	—	—	—	—	—	—	58	49	—		Travelling Without Moving
"Virtual Insanity"	1996	3	75	15	16	63	—	—	32	19	—	BPI: Platinum; RMNZ: Platinum	Travelling Without Moving
"Cosmic Girl"	1996	6	33	34	23	55	78	29	45	—	—	BPI: Platinum; RMNZ: Gold	Travelling Without Moving
"Alright"	1997	6	84	38	—	98	—	—	—	—	78	BPI: Silver	Travelling Without Moving
"High Times"	1997	20	—	—	—	—	—	—	—	—	—		Travelling Without Moving
"Deeper Underground"	1998	1	46	20	24	30	18	33	44	9	—	BPI: Silver	Godzilla: The Album
"Canned Heat"	1999	4	20	39	30	28	31	26	35	9	—	BPI: Gold; RMNZ: Gold	Synkronized
"Supersonic"	1999	22	104	—	—	—	75	—	—	—	—		Synkronized
"Black Capricorn Day"	1999	—	—	—	—	—	—	—	—	—	—		Synkronized
"King for a Day"	1999	20	—	—	—	—	89	—	—	51	—		Synkronized
"I'm in the Mood for Love" (with Jools Holland)	2000	29	—	—	—	—	—	—	—	—	—		Kevin & Perry Go Large
"Little L"	2001	5	14	17	22	50	51	44	42	14	—	BPI: Gold; RMNZ: Gold	A Funk Odyssey
"You Give Me Something"	2001	16	34	43	30	—	86	—	—	61	—	BPI: Silver	A Funk Odyssey
"Love Foolosophy"	2002	14	19	44	—	82	85	—	—	32	—	BPI: Silver	A Funk Odyssey
"Corner of the Earth"	2002	31	52	—	—	—	—	—	—	94	—		A Funk Odyssey
"Feels Just Like It Should"	2005	8	27	45	—	69	88	—	60	33	—		Dynamite
"Seven Days in Sunny June"	2005	14	56	50	—	78	49	—	—	79	—	BPI: Silver	Dynamite
"(Don't) Give Hate a Chance"	2005	27	—	—	—	93	—	—	—	82	—		Dynamite
"Runaway"	2006	18	—	47	—	—	73	—	—	12	—		High Times: Singles 1992–2006
"White Knuckle Ride"	2010	39	96	34	—	49	15	—	—	20	—		Rock Dust Light Star
"Blue Skies"	2010	76	—	52	—	—	79	—	—	—	—		Rock Dust Light Star
"Lifeline"	2011	—	—	—	—	—	—	—	—	—	—		Rock Dust Light Star
"Automaton"	2017	—	—	—	39	—	—	—	—	—	—		Automaton
"Cloud 9"	2017	—	—	62	157	—	—	—	—	80	—		Automaton
"Superfresh"	2017	—	—	—	—	—	—	—	—	—	—		Automaton
"Everybody's Going to the Moon" (Note: A previously unreleased single from 2000's Titan A.E.)	2021	—	—	—	—	—	—	—	—	—	—		Non-album single
"—" denotes singles that did not chart or were not released.

=== Promotional singles ===
Title	Year	Album
"If I Like It, I Do It"	1994	Emergency on Planet Earth
"Morning Glory"	1995	The Return of the Space Cowboy
"Smile"	2011	Non-album singles
"Your Window It's a Crazy Television" (Note: Outtake from Rock Dust Light Star (exclusive vinyl release for VIP ticket holders))	2025	Non-album singles

== Music videos ==
List of music videos, showing year released and directors.
Title	Year	Director(s)
"When You Gonna Learn"	1993	Morgan Lawley
"Too Young to Die"	1993	W.I.Z.
"Blow Your Mind"	1993	Vaughan Arnell and Anthea Benton
"Emergency on Planet Earth"	1993	W.I.Z.
"If I Like It, I Do It"	1994	N/A
"Space Cowboy"	1994	Vaughan Arnell and Anthea Benton
"Half the Man"	1994	Paul Boyd
"Light Years"	1995	Christian Stevenson, Jim Wedlake and Jack Bibbo
"Stillness in Time"	1995	Earle Sebastian
"Do U Know Where You're Coming From" (with M-Beat)	1996	Steven Picks
"Virtual Insanity"	1996	Jonathan Glazer
"Cosmic Girl"	1996	Adrian Moat
"Alright"	1997	Vaughan Arnell
"High Times"	1997	Cassius Coleman
"Deeper Underground"	1998	Mike Lipscombe
"Canned Heat"	1999	Jonas Åkerlund
"Supersonic"	1999	Cassius Coleman
"Black Capricorn Day"	1999	John McFarlane
"King for a Day"	1999	Dawn Shadforth
"I'm in the Mood for Love" (with Jools Holland)	2001	Clive Arrowsmith
"Little L"	2001	Stéphane Sednaoui
"You Give Me Something"	2001	Dawn Shadforth
"Love Foolosophy"	2001	Jason Smith
"Corner of the Earth"	2002	Jason Smith
"Feels Just Like It Should"	2005	Joseph Kahn
"Seven Days in Sunny June"	2005	Mat Kirkby
"(Don't) Give Hate a Chance"	2005	Alex and Martin
"Runaway"	2006	James Hackett and Jay Kay
"White Knuckle Ride"	2010	Howard Greenhalgh
"Blue Skies"	2010	Howard Greenhalgh
"Lifeline"	2011	Charlie Lightening
"Automaton"	2017	Charlie Lightening
"Cloud 9"	2017	Charlie Lightening
"Superfresh"	2017	Charlie Lightening
"Summer Girl"	2017	Charlie Lightening
"Nights Out in the Jungle"	2017	Jason Smith
