= In-Store Jam =

In Store Jam

Compilation album by Jamiroquai
- Released: 1997 (US)
- Recorded: 1993–1996
- Genre: Funk, acid jazz, R&B, soul, pop, disco
- Length: 42:48
- Label: Sony Music
- Producer: Pete Spence

Jamiroquai chronology
Travelling Without Moving (1996)	In Store Jam (1997)	Synkronized (1999)

In-Store Jam is the second compilation album released by British funk/acid jazz band Jamiroquai. Released as a promotional album in 1997, the record features a selection of tracks from all three of the group's early studio albums, as well as an additional live recording of Kool & the Gang's "Hollywood Swinging". All of the tracks from the album have, or been considered to become, singles. The album was only released in the United States. Two versions of the release were available: a standard CD, and a cassette tape release, retitled Sampler, with the addition of an extra track.

== Track listing ==
All tracks are written by Jay Kay and Toby Smith, except where noted.

In-Store Jam track listing
No.	Title	Writer(s)	Original release	Length
1.	"Everyday"	Kay; Smith; Stuart Zender	Travelling Without Moving – Cassette Tape Only	4:28
2.	"Virtual Insanity"		Travelling Without Moving	5:40
3.	"Alright"		Travelling Without Moving	4:25
4.	"Light Years"		The Return of the Space Cowboy	5:53
5.	"Space Cowboy"	Kay	The Return of the Space Cowboy	6:25
6.	"Emergency on Planet Earth"		Emergency on Planet Earth	4:05
7.	"Too Young to Die"		Emergency on Planet Earth	6:05
8.	"Hollywood Swinging" (Live in the Chicago Riviera)	Robert Bell; Ronald Bell	Kool & the Gang cover	5:47
Total length:				42:48
