= Jamiroquai – Live at Montreux 2003 =

Live album by Jamiroquai
- Released: 1 October 2007
- Recorded: Montreux Convention Centre, 2003, aside from track 16, which was recorded on 12 July 1995, at the same place.
- Genre: Acid jazz, funk, alternative dance
- Length: ("150 minutes approx.")
- Language: English
- Label: Eagle Vision

Jamiroquai chronology
High Times: Singles 1992-2006 (2006)	Jamiroquai – Live at Montreux 2003 (2007)	Rock Dust Light Star (2010)

Jamiroquai – Live at Montreux 2003 is a DVD/Blu-ray of a concert performed by the British band Jamiroquai at the 2003 Montreux Jazz Festival. The DVD was released on 1 October 2007 through Eagle Vision, a distributor also related to other DVD releases of Montreux Jazz Festival performances, and the same distributor later published the HD Blu-ray version on 4 August 2009.

While the concert had previously been bootlegged in whole by fans, this disc is the first official release of the concert's recording. While the DVD and Blu-ray features all of the tracks from the festival (including the notoriously rare "Shoot the Moon"), it also features a 12-minute live version of "Space Cowboy", recorded at the same jazz festival, albeit in 1995.

Most of this concert's songs are extended, a prime example being "Travelling Without Moving", which lasts for 3 minutes and 40 seconds on the album but 12 minutes during the concert. Such extended performances are common for the band's live concerts.

== Track listing ==
All tracks recorded at the 2003 Montreux jazz festival unless otherwise noted.

1. Use the Force
2. Canned Heat
3. Cosmic Girl
4. Little L
5. Blow Your Mind
6. High Times
7. Travelling Without Moving
8. Butterfly
9. Shoot the Moon
10. Soul Education
11. Just Another Story
12. Mr Moon
13. Alright
14. Love Foolosophy
15. Deeper Underground
16. Space Cowboy (Recorded on 12 July 1995 at the Montreux Music & Convention Centre during the 1995 Montreux Jazz Festival)

== Personnel ==
- Jason Kay – vocals
- Matt Johnson – keyboards
- Rob Harris – guitar
- Nick Fyffe – bass
- Derrick McKenzie – drums
- Sola Akingbola – percussion, backing vocals
- Hazel Fernandez – backing vocals
- Lorraine McIntosh – backing vocals

== Charts ==
Chart (2007)	Peak position
Australian DVD chart (ARIA Charts)	40
