= Gig in the Sky =

2007 concert by Jamiroquai

Gig in the Sky was a record-breaking concert performed by the British band Jamiroquai on a private Boeing 757 operated by Titan Airways during February 2007. The concert was organised and promoted by Sony Ericsson for the band's compilation album High Times: Singles 1992–2006.

== Concert ==
The Gig in the Sky concert began as a competition held by Sony Ericsson that accepted 200 winners onto a private jet to see Jamiroquai play live. The jet was a modified Boeing 757 that contained altered lighting, staging and space for the band. Jamiroquai's unofficial logo, the Buffalo Man, was painted on the exterior.

The Gig in the Sky commenced on 27 February 2007, when the flight took off at 4:00 am; it was scheduled to fly from Munich to Athens. Midway through the flight, at an altitude of 35,000 feet, the concert commenced, with Jamiroquai playing five songs, including two new songs from their compilation album High Times: Singles 1992–2006, released in November the previous year.

After touchdown, passengers were invited to attend an after-party held at a nearby hotel in Athens before returning home.

== Records ==
As part of the concert's promotion by Sony Ericsson, Jamiroquai additionally aimed to qualify for several unique Guinness World Records. During the concert, an adjudicator from Guinness World Records was present on the plane in order to present the records to Jay Kay of Jamiroquai at the end of the performance.

The band broke six records, including the highest and fastest concert, recording, and gig in a plane. These were not the first records received by the band—Jamiroquai also held the record for the greatest-selling funk album of all time, Travelling Without Moving.

Since then, Black Eyed Peas took the world record for highest concert in an aircraft, at 41,000 ft on 9 September 2009, in conjunction with the world's highest recorded track. The event was named "Mile High Karaoke" and was awarded the Guinness World Record certificate. Since then, the altitude records have been beaten further by English pop/rock artist James Blunt in 2010, who performed a concert at the altitude of 42,080 feet, and in 2013 by Kim Wilde and Tony Hadley at 43,000 ft, where the record stands today. Jamiroquai still holds the record for the highest recording and fastest concert.

== Setlist ==
On board the plane:

1. Radio
2. Feels Just Like It Should
3. High Times
4. If I Like It, I Do It
5. Travelling Without Moving
6. Runaway

Athens:

1. Cosmic Girl
2. Space Cowboy
3. High Times
4. Black Capricorn Day
5. Little L
6. Radio
7. Feels Just Like It Should
8. Use The Force
9. If I Like It, I Do It
10. Travelling Without Moving
11. Love Foolosophy
12. Time Won't Wait
13. Deeper Underground

== See also ==
- Guinness World Records
