= High Times: Singles 1992–2006 =

Greatest hits album by Jamiroquai
- Released: 6 November 2006
- Recorded: 1992–2006
- Genres: Funk; acid jazz; R&B; pop; rock; dance; disco
- Length: 75:06
- Labels: Sony BMG; Epic

Jamiroquai chronology
Dynamite (2005)	High Times: Singles 1992–2006 (2006)	Multiquai (2006)

Singles from High Times: Singles 1992–2006
- 1. "Runaway" Released: 30 October 2006

Alternative cover
- Cover of the UK DVD video album

Professional ratings
Review scores
Source	Rating
AllMusic	4/5 stars
Okayplayer	89/100
The Skinny	2/5 stars

High Times: Singles 1992–2006 is a compilation album by the British band Jamiroquai, released on 6 November 2006 in the United Kingdom and 8 November 2006 in Japan.

The album was intended to be a collection of the group's singles, but it is more widely known as a compilation of their best-known hits, as it does not include the singles "Stillness in Time", "Half the Man" (available on both the regular and deluxe Japanese pressings), "Light Years", "Supersonic", "King for a Day", and "You Give Me Something" (available on the 2022 vinyl reissue), as well as omitting the international-only singles "The Kids" and "Black Capricorn Day".

The album also includes two newly recorded songs, "Runaway" and "Radio". High Times, which peaked at No. 1 on the UK Albums Chart, ended Jamiroquai's tumultuous contract with Sony BMG.

The sleeve art features Jay Kay's signature Silver Crown headpiece, photographed on a beach with rock formations.

== 2022 vinyl release ==
In December 2022, more than 16 years after its original release, High Times was issued on vinyl for the first time, including a standard version and a special-edition green version with a collector's booklet. The vinyl version also included the track "You Give Me Something", which had been omitted from previous releases.

== Track listing ==
No.	Title	Writer(s)	Original release	Length
1.	"When You Gonna Learn"	Jay Kay	Emergency on Planet Earth, 1993	3:49
2.	"Too Young to Die" (edit)	Kay, Toby Smith	Emergency on Planet Earth, 1993	3:23
3.	"Blow Your Mind" (edit)	Kay, Smith	Emergency on Planet Earth, 1993	3:56
4.	"Emergency on Planet Earth" (edit)	Kay, Smith	Emergency on Planet Earth, 1993	3:37
5.	"Space Cowboy" (edit)	Kay	The Return of the Space Cowboy, 1994	3:37
6.	"Virtual Insanity" (edit)	Kay, Smith	Travelling Without Moving, 1996	3:49
7.	"Cosmic Girl" (edit)	Derrick McKenzie, Kay	Travelling Without Moving, 1996	3:47
8.	"Alright" (edit)	Kay, Smith	Travelling Without Moving, 1996	3:42
9.	"High Times" (edit)	McKenzie, Kay, Smith, Stuart Zender	Travelling Without Moving, 1996	4:10
10.	"Deeper Underground"	Kay, Smith	Synkronized, 1999	4:46
11.	"Canned Heat" (edit)	Kay	Synkronized, 1999	3:48
12.	"Little L" (edit)	Kay, Smith	A Funk Odyssey, 2001	3:59
13.	"Love Foolosophy"	Kay, Smith	A Funk Odyssey, 2001	3:47
14.	"Corner of the Earth" (edit)	Kay, Rob Harris	A Funk Odyssey, 2001	3:56
15.	"Feels Just Like It Should"	Kay	Dynamite, 2005	4:33
16.	"Seven Days in Sunny June"	Matt Johnson, Kay	Dynamite, 2005	4:02
17.	"(Don't) Give Hate a Chance" (edit)	Johnson, Kay, Harris	Dynamite, 2005	3:51
18.	"Runaway"	Johnson, Kay, Harris	Previously unreleased	3:46
19.	"Radio"	Kay	Previously unreleased	4:12
Total length:				74:30

Japanese bonus tracks
No.	Title	Writer(s)	Original release	Length
20.	"Half the Man" (edit)	Kay, Smith	The Return of the Space Cowboy	3:37

- Deluxe edition bonus disc
1. "Emergency on Planet Earth" (Masters at Work Remix) – 7:10
2. "Space Cowboy" (David Morales Remix) – 7:52
3. "Love Foolosophy" (Knee Deep Remix) – 8:27
4. "Little L" (Bob Sinclar Remix) – 7:24
5. "Cosmic Girl" (Tom Belton Remix) – 7:46
6. "Dynamite" (Restless Souls Remix) – 7:40
7. "Seven Days in Sunny June" (Ashley Beedle Heavy Disco Vocal Remix) – 7:54
8. "Virtual Insanity" (Salaam Remi Remix) – 5:41
9. "You Give Me Something" (Blacksmith R&B Remix) – 4:02
10. "Supersonic" (Restless Souls Remix) – 8:26
- Japanese bonus tracks

11. "Runaway" (Tom Belton Remix) – 3:29
12. "Feels So Good" (Knee Deep Remix) – 3:44
13. "Love Foolosophy" (Mondo Grosso Love Acoustic Mix) – 4:43

- Japanese super deluxe edition bonus DVD
1. "Too Young to Die"
2. "Emergency on Planet Earth"
3. "Space Cowboy"
4. "Half the Man"
5. "Virtual Insanity"
6. "Cosmic Girl"
7. "Deeper Underground"
8. "Canned Heat"
9. "Little L"
10. "Love Foolosophy"
11. "Feels Just Like It Should"
12. "Seven Days in Sunny June"
13. "Runaway"
- UK DVD video album
1. "When You Gonna Learn" – 3:49
2. "Too Young to Die" – 3:23
3. "Blow Your Mind" – 3:56
4. "Emergency on Planet Earth" – 3:37
5. "If I Like It, I Do It" – 4:47
6. "Space Cowboy" – 3:37
7. "Half the Man" – 4:50
8. "Light Years" – 5:13
9. "Stillness in Time" – 4:15
10. "Virtual Insanity" – 3:49
11. "Cosmic Girl" – 3:47
12. "Alright" – 3:42
13. "High Times" – 4:10
14. "Deeper Underground" – 4:46
15. "Canned Heat" – 3:48
16. "Supersonic" – 5:02
17. "King for a Day" – 3:41
18. "Black Capricorn Day" – 4:02
19. "Little L" – 3:59
20. "You Give Me Something" – 3:21
21. "Love Foolosophy" – 3:47
22. "Corner of the Earth" – 3:56
23. "Feels Just Like It Should" – 4:33
24. "Seven Days in Sunny June" – 4:02
25. "(Don't) Give Hate a Chance" – 3:51
26. "The Making of Little L" – 8:16
27. 4× mini movie clips
28. "The Lost J-Wave Interview"

== Charts ==
=== Weekly charts ===
Chart (2006–2008)	Peak position
Australian Albums (ARIA)	11
Austrian Albums (Ö3 Austria)	23
Belgian Albums (Ultratop Flanders)	8
Belgian Albums (Ultratop Wallonia)	3
Dutch Albums (Album Top 100)	31
Finnish Albums (Suomen virallinen lista)	19
German Albums (Offizielle Top 100)	33
Hungarian Albums (MAHASZ)	35
Italian Albums (FIMI)	5
Japanese Albums (Oricon)	4
New Zealand Albums (RMNZ)	20
Portuguese Albums (AFP)	14
Scottish Albums (Official Charts)	5
Spanish Albums (Promusicae)	20
Swiss Albums (Schweizer Hitparade)	1
UK Albums (Official Charts)	1

=== Year-end charts ===
Chart (2006)	Position
Australian Albums (ARIA)	100
Belgian Albums (Ultratop Wallonia)	54
Italian Albums (FIMI)	73
Japanese Albums (Oricon)	68
Swiss Albums (Schweizer Hitparade)	51
UK Albums (OCC)	27

== Certifications ==
Region	Certification	Certified units/sales
Australia (ARIA)	Platinum	70,000^{^}
Belgium (BRMA)	Gold	25,000^{*}
France (SNEP)	Gold	75,000^{*}
Germany (BVMI)	Gold	100,000^{‡}
Ireland (IRMA)	Platinum	15,000^{^}
Italy (FIMI) sales since 2009	Platinum	50,000^{‡}
Japan (RIAJ)	Platinum	250,000^{^}
Mexico (AMPROFON)	Gold	50,000^{‡}
New Zealand (RMNZ)	Gold	7,500^{‡}
Russia (NFPF)	Gold	10,000^{*}
Switzerland (IFPI Switzerland)	Gold	15,000^{^}
United Kingdom (BPI)	3× Platinum	893,324
^{*} Sales figures based on certification alone.^{^} Shipments figures based on certification alone.^{‡} Sales+streaming figures based on certification alone.
