= Stillness in Time =

1995 single by Jamiroquai

Single by Jamiroquai

from the album The Return of the Space Cowboy
- B-side: "Space Cowboy" (classic radio edit)
- Released: 19 June 1995
- Length: 4:16
- Label: Sony Soho Square
- Songwriters: Jay Kay; Toby Smith
- Producer: Rick Pope

Jamiroquai singles chronology
"Light Years" (1995)	"Stillness in Time" (1995)	"Do U Know Where You're Coming From" (1996)

Music video
- "Stillness in Time" on YouTube

"Stillness in Time" is a song by British funk and acid jazz band Jamiroquai, released in 1994 on their second studio album, The Return of the Space Cowboy (1994), and the year after as a single by Sony Soho Square. The track was written by Jay Kay and Toby Smith, and peaked at number nine on the UK Singles Chart, making it the group's highest-charting release to that date. It also reached number one on the UK Dance Chart and number 14 in Scotland.

== Background ==
Three main versions of the track exist: a radio edit, which runs at 3:43; the main album version, which runs at 4:11; and the extended vinyl version, which runs at 6:13 and appears on the vinyl version of The Return of the Space Cowboy.

== Cover ==
The song was later covered by Scottish DJ Calvin Harris for Radio 1's 40th-anniversary album, Radio 1 Established 1967, which was released in 2007. This version features snippets of the Jamiroquai original; however, Jamiroquai is not credited on the release.

== Music video ==
At least two edits of the music video exist—one for a UK release, and another one for an international release; the latter is still airing on some European music television channels. The music video, directed by Earle Sebastian, prominently features the entire band throughout (unusual for Jamiroquai videos, which typically tend to focus almost exclusively on singer Jay Kay). The video takes place in the Australian outback, with Kay claiming temperatures were around 110 °F (43 °C) during filming. The video intercuts between the band dancing around and brief moments of the band playing their respective instruments. The band's didgeridoo player, Wallis Buchanan, can be seen wearing a t-shirt with the Aboriginal flag.

== Critical reception ==
Pan-European magazine Music & Media wrote, "By going retro the clock automatically stands still at '70s soul. From wine bars to chic night clubs to the more sophisticated stations, the song will be used to create ambience." A reviewer from Music Week gave it three out of five, adding, "A slightly more down tempo funky Latin tune from The Return of the Space Cowboy with Morales mixes of the album's title track on the flip. A summery jaunt." Roger Morton from NME felt its "fractal flute solos verge on cocktail bar friendliness."

== Track listing ==
- UK CD: 1 (662025 2)
1. "Stillness in Time" (radio edit) – 3:40
2. "Space Cowboy" (classic radio edit) – 4:01
3. "Space Cowboy" (classic club mix) – 7:52
4. "Stillness in Time" (vinyl version) – 6:13
- UK CD: 2
1. "Stillness in Time" (vinyl version) – 6:13
2. "Emergency on Planet Earth" – 4:04
3. "Space Cowboy" (radio edit) – 3:46
4. "Light Years" (radio edit) – 3:59
- UK 12-inch vinyl (662025 6)
1. "Stillness in Time" (vinyl version) – 6:13
2. "Space Cowboy" (classic radio edit) – 4:01
3. "Space Cowboy" (classic club mix) – 7:52

== Charts ==
Chart (1995)	Peak position
Scotland (OCC)	14
UK Singles (OCC)	9
UK Dance (OCC)	1
