= Half the Man (Jamiroquai song) =

Single by Jamiroquai

from the album The Return of the Space Cowboy
- B-side: "Space Clav"
- Released: 7 November 1994
- Genre: Jazz-funk; soul
- Length: 4:50
- Label: S2
- Songwriters: Jay Kay; Toby Smith
- Producer: Rick Pope

Jamiroquai singles chronology
"Space Cowboy" (1994)	"Half the Man" (1994)	"Light Years" (1995)

Music video
- "Half the Man" on YouTube

"Half the Man" is a song by British funk/acid jazz band Jamiroquai, released in November 1994 by S2 Records as a single from their second studio album, The Return of the Space Cowboy (1994). The song is written by band members Jay Kay and Toby Smith, and produced by Rick Pope. It peaked at number 15 on the UK Singles Chart. The accompanying music video was directed by Paul Boyd and filmed in black-and-white. "Half the Man" is in the key of D major.

== Background ==
The track was later featured on the soundtrack of cult British surf movie Blue Juice. With the exception of its inclusion on both regular and deluxe Japanese pressings, it is one of nine pre-2006 singles that do not appear on the group's greatest hits album, High Times: Singles 1992–2006. There are two different versions of the music video for the track. The first video features Jay Kay performing the song, intercut with footage of a couple kissing. The second video removes the footage of the couple kissing. The track was later released as the double A-side to "Light Years" in the United States.

According to Toby Smith's (keyboards) acknowledgments in the vinyl 2-LP reissue of The Return of the Space Cowboy, the song was inspired by a woman named Gabriella.

== Critical reception ==
In his weekly UK chart commentary, James Masterton wrote, "For Jamiroquai, operating here it seems on autopilot with another piece of jazz/funk that is so distinctively him that he is in danger of sounding formulaic." A reviewer from The Mix noted that "the ghost of Stevie Wonder lingers particularly on 'Half the Man', an appealing tune in which even J.K.'s vocal at times resembles Stevie's harmonica." Pan-European magazine Music & Media commented, "Spaced out after his first single off the new album, Jamiroquai now conjures up the rabbit out of his hat: a mildly swinging track with great radio-in-a-coffee-shop capacity."

Andy Beevers from Music Week gave it a score of four out of five and named it Pick of the Week in the category of Dance, adding that "this mid-tempo track is a real grower and underlines how Jamiroquai's songwriting has matured." John Robinson from NME said, "'Half a Man' is really rather good. Jason has his 'I Like Traffic' hat on here, and he creates a lurching, soulful vibe, before getting sidelined in his trademark ooobee-dabba-ooobee-dabba-dooo rubbish." Tony Farsides from the Record Mirror Dance Update noted that "the slow introspective 'Half the Man' is easily as good as anything Jamiroquai have done". Pete Stanton from Smash Hits wrote, "Gentle, laid-back soul that'd be at home in Ricardo's Wine Bar."

== Music video ==
The music video for "Half the Man" was directed by Scottish music video, commercial and feature film director Paul Boyd. It is made in one single take and is in black-and-white. The video was first officially published on YouTube in November 2009, and had generated more than 5.4 million views as of early 2025.

== Track listings ==
- UK CD single 1
1. "Half the Man" (Edit) – 3:35
2. "Space Clav" – 4:56 (Written by – Gary Barnacle/Toby Smith/Stuart Zender)
3. "Emergency on Planet Earth" (London Rican Mix) – 7:10
4. "Half the Man" (Album Version) – 4:48
- UK CD single 2
1. "Half the Man" (Edit) – 3:35
2. "When You Gonna Learn (Didgeridoo)" – 3:48
3. "Too Young to Die" (Edit) – 3:22
4. "Blow Your Mind" (Edit) – 3:51
- UK 12" vinyl
1. "Half the Man" (Edit) – 3:35
2. "Emergency on Planet Earth" (London Rican Mix) – 7:10
3. "Space Clav" – 4:56

== Charts ==
=== Weekly charts ===
Chart (1994–1995)	Peak position
Australia (ARIA)	198
Netherlands (Dutch Top 40 Tipparade)	13
Netherlands (Dutch Single Tip)	10
Scotland (OCC)	20
UK Singles (OCC)	15

=== Year-end charts ===
Chart (1994)	Position
UK Singles (OCC)	164
