= Multiquai =

Compilation album by Jamiroquai
- Released: 14 November 2006
- Length: 16:24
- Label: Sony BMG
- Producer: Al Stone; Jason Kay; Toby Smith

Jamiroquai chronology
High Times: Singles 1992-2006 (2006)	Multiquai (2006)	Rock Dust Light Star (2010)

Multiquai is the sixth compilation album released by British funk/acid jazz band Jamiroquai. The album was released in November 2006, as part of the "Multiply Your Jamiroquai" promotion, which involved the band, computer manufacturer Intel, and British computer retailer PC World. It was one of a selection of prizes issued to winners of a competition, with other prizes including tickets to an exclusive performance, "JK for Hugo", and a day's driving experience with the band. The album is only playable on a computer.

== Track listing ==
Multiquai track listing – Sony BMG (88697031302)
No.	Title	Writer(s)	Length
1.	"Canned Heat" (Masters at Work Remix)	Jay Kay, Sola Akingbola, Wallis Buchanan, Simon Katz, Derrick McKenzie, Toby Smith	8:25
2.	"Little L" (Blaze Shelter Mix)	Jay Kay & Toby Smith	6:18
3.	"Love Foolosophy" (Lottie's Missdemeanours Vocal Mix)	Jay Kay & Toby Smith	7:14
4.	"Emergency on Planet Earth" (video)	Jay Kay & Toby Smith	4:10
5.	"Cosmic Girl" (video)	Jay Kay & Derrick McKenzie	4:00
6.	"Virtual Insanity" (video)	Jay Kay & Toby Smith	4:01
7.	"Jamiroquai on Tour" (video)		5:09
Total length:			39:17
