= Blow Your Mind (Jamiroquai song) =

1993 single by Jamiroquai

Single by Jamiroquai

from the album Emergency on Planet Earth
- B-side: "Hooked Up" (instrumental)
- Released: 24 May 1993
- Genre: Jazz-funk
- Length: 8:35 (album version); 3:51 (radio edit)
- Label: Sony Soho Square
- Songwriters: Jay Kay; Toby Smith
- Producer: Rick Pope

Jamiroquai singles chronology
"Too Young to Die" (1993)	"Blow Your Mind" (1993)	"Emergency on Planet Earth" (1993)

Music video
- "Blow Your Mind" on YouTube

"Blow Your Mind" is the third overall single to be released from British funk/acid jazz band Jamiroquai's debut studio album, Emergency on Planet Earth (1993). It was released on 24 May 1993 through Sony Soho Square in the United Kingdom, peaking at number 12 on the UK Singles Chart. The song was written by frontman Jay Kay with Toby Smith, and produced by Rick Pope. Its accompanying music video was directed by Vaughan Arnell and Anthea Benton.

== Background ==
The single was later featured on the group's greatest hits compilation, High Times: Singles 1992–2006; however, its release was a shorter version rather than the original album-length track. Like both of the group's previous singles, two versions of the song exist: a heavily edited radio edit, running at 3:51, and the full-length album version, running at 8:35. The latter version has only ever been officially included on the group's debut album release (as well as the 2013 remaster). All other releases which include the track include the radio edit. The B-side of the single is an instrumental version of the popular Emergency on Planet Earth track "Hooked Up".

== Critical reception ==
In his weekly UK chart commentary, James Masterton wrote, "In many ways this new single is not quite as good a song [as 'Too Young to Die'] – this star still has a little way to rise." The Stud Brothers from Melody Maker viewed it as "classy, elegant and unspeakably dull." Steve Morton from Music & Media said, "Again, not unreminiscent of Mr Stevie Wonder and he does it so well. Light piano tinkles, funky guitar flutters, horns ride the controlled storm and that voice breathes each soulful note out effortlessly. Less obviously catchy than 'Too Young to Die' but it just oozes summer all over you." Another Music & Media editor stated, "On a hopping funky bass line Jay is scatting his vocals, while the horn section exhales full blast. Mind blowingly good stuff!"

Andy Beevers from Music Week gave the song a score of four out of five and named it Pick of the Week in the category of Dance, adding, "The kid can do no wrong at the moment. His third single is a breezy jazz funk track that lacks the lyrical message of its predecessors but is already turning out to be a winner on the nation's dancefloors. Its chart success is assured." Ian McCann from NME wrote, "Jamiroquai gets all smooth and mildly funky. [...] Wait for the album, wherein this silky-drawered thing belongs." Kevin L. Carter from Philadelphia Inquirer felt the "extended electric-piano showcase" recalls early Herbie Hancock. James Hamilton from the Record Mirror Dance Update named it "excellent" and "brassy" in his weekly dance column. Stuart Maconie from Select wrote that it "sounds like George Benson chilling out at the health spa".

== Music video ==
A black-and-white music video was produced to promote the single, directed by British music video directors Vaughan Arnell and Anthea Benton, and convey's a "hanging out vibe". It shows a group of people dancing in a 1970s club, where Jamiroquai are performing the song to the paying crowd. The video was produced by Adam Seward for Lewin And Watson and released on 17 May 1993. "Blow Your Mind" was later made available on the band's official YouTube channel in 2009 and had generated more than 15 million views as of July 2025.

== Track listings ==
- UK CD single (659297 2)
1. "Blow Your Mind" (Radio Edit) – 3:51
2. "Blow Your Mind" (Album Version) – 8:35
3. "Hooked Up" (Instrumental) – 4:36
4. "When You Gonna Learn" (JK Mix) – 6:20
- UK 12-inch vinyl (659297 6)
1. "Blow Your Mind" (Album Version) – 8:35
2. "Hooked Up" (Instrumental) – 4:36
- UK cassette single (659297 4)
1. "Blow Your Mind" (Part 1) – 3:51
2. "Hooked Up" – 4:36
- Japanese CD single (ESCA 5782)
1. "Blow Your Mind" (Radio Edit) – 3:51
2. "Blow Your Mind" (Parts 1 and 2) – 8:35
3. "When You Gonna Learn" (JK Mix) – 6:20

== Charts ==
Chart (1993)	Peak position
Europe (Eurochart Hot 100)	53
Europe (European Dance Radio)	5
Europe (European Hit Radio)	33
UK Singles (OCC)	12
UK Airplay (Music Week)	11
UK Dance (Music Week)	2
UK Club Chart (Music Week)	14

== Release history ==
Region	Date	Format(s)	Label(s)	Ref.
United Kingdom	24 May 1993	12-inch vinyl; CD; cassette	Sony Soho Square	
Japan	1 July 1993	CD	Epic	
Australia	8 November 1993	CD; cassette	Sony Soho Square	
