= Kids (Jamiroquai song) =

"The Kids"

Single by Jamiroquai

from the album The Return of the Space Cowboy
- Released: 12 December 1993
- Recorded: 1993
- Genre: Funk; acid jazz
- Length: 5:08
- Label: Epic
- Songwriters: Jason Kay; Toby Smith
- Producer: Jason Kay

Jamiroquai singles chronology
"Emergency on Planet Earth" (1993)	"The Kids" (1993)	"Space Cowboy" (1994)

Audio video
- "The Kids" on YouTube

"The Kids" is the first single taken from British funk/acid jazz band Jamiroquai's second studio album, The Return of the Space Cowboy (1994), though it was recorded shortly after the Emergency on Planet Earth sessions and was not a worldwide single release. The single was only released in Japan, on 12 December 1993 by Epic. "The Kids" is a song that deals with the rights of children and their social status in the world. It is written to be absurdly loud and high in tempo, to possibly represent the immaturity of children, and more generally the whole early childhood of a person, which is usually a carefree time of life.

== Background ==
After "The Kids" was recorded with drummer Nick Van Gelder, all Space Cowboy tracks except "The Kids" were re-recorded with Derrick McKenzie on drums.

== Critical reception ==
David Stubbs from Melody Maker wrote, "'The Kids' is both nifty and raunchy, with breakneck bass and a growling, lively fuzzbox chasing its own tail." Roger Morton from NME found that the track "is driven by some cool whiplash wah wah guitars". Matt Hall from Select said, "At the start of 'Kids', Kay barks "Ha, now we're getting nasty!" and the band launch into a mad, punk-funk workout the Red Hot Chilis would give their little cotton socks to have written." Siân Pattenden from Smash Hits named it the "best stuff" of the album, alongside "Space Cowboy".

== Track listing ==
- Japanese CD single
1. "The Kids" – 4:13
2. "When You Gonna Learn" (Live at Leadmill, Sheffield) – 9:51
3. "When You Gonna Learn" (Digeridoo Instrumental) – 6:31
