= Karen Kay (TV personality) =

British singer and comedian (born 1947)

- Born: Adrianne Judith Pringle; 18 July 1947 (age 79); Blackburn, Lancashire, England
- Occupations: Comedian; actress; TV impressionist; singer
- Spouse: Mervyn Kay (?–?)
- Children: Jay Kay (born 1969)

Karen Kay (born Adrianne Judith Pringle; born 18 July 1947) is a British former jazz singer, cabaret singer, comedian, and impressionist. She is the mother of jazz-funk singer-songwriter and Jamiroquai frontman Jay Kay.

== Life and career ==
Kay was born Adrianne Judith Pringle in Blackburn, England, the daughter of Ethel (Hesmondhalgh) and James S. Pringle. Her mother died when she was young, and after living briefly with her cousin's family, she was adopted by the Cheetham family of Preston, Lancashire. Karen's adoptive father Victor (Vic) Cheetham was a fighter pilot in World War II; he served in Burma with No. 113 Squadron RAF flying Hurri-bombers, supporting infantry action around Dimapur and Palel in 1944.

Kay made her professional debut in the Black and White Minstrel Show, Blackpool, when she was 16, adopting the stage name Karen Kay at around that time.

On 30 December 1969, while living in Blackburn, Lancashire, she gave birth to twin boys, Jason and David, fathered by Portuguese musician Luís Saraiva. David died a few weeks after birth. Jason went on to become the vocalist and frontman of British acid jazz group Jamiroquai in 1992, under the stage name Jay Kay.

Kay was a regular guest at the Starlight Club in Little Harwood, and was tipped as The Face of 1979. She worked with Lenny Henry and David Copperfield on a TV series entitled Six of a Kind, which was produced without her under the title Three of a Kind.

Kay appeared and acted in Lennie and Jerry (1979), Des O'Connor Tonight (1981), Max Bygraves Side by Side (1982), The Bob Monkhouse Show (1983) and Aspel and Company (1985). She had her own television series, Karen Kay, in 1983.
