= Light Years (Jamiroquai song) =

1995 single by Jamiroquai

Single by Jamiroquai

from the album The Return of the Space Cowboy
- B-side: "We Gettin' Down"
- Released: 20 February 1995
- Genre: Funk
- Length: 5:53
- Label: Sony Soho Square
- Songwriters: Jay Kay; Toby Smith
- Producer: Rick Pope

Jamiroquai singles chronology
"Half the Man" (1994)	"Light Years" (1995)	"Stillness in Time" (1995)

Music video
- "Light Years" on YouTube

"Light Years" is a song by the British funk and acid jazz band Jamiroquai, originally released in 1994 as a song from their second studio album, The Return of the Space Cowboy (1994). It is written by band members Jay Kay and Toby Smith, and produced by Rick Pope. The song was released as a single on 20 February 1995 by Sony Soho Square, but it failed to appear on the UK Singles Chart. The accompanying music video was directed by Christian Stevenson, and shows clips of snowboarding along with the band partaking in the activity.

== Background ==
In the United States, the song peaked at number six on the Billboard Hot Dance Club Play chart, mainly because the American version of the physical single features three mixes of the song by popular producer David Morales. The American release of The Return of the Space Cowboy also features a live version of "Light Years", performed in Marseille in December 1994, as a bonus track. Two main versions of the song exist: the radio edit, running at 3:59, and an album version, which lasts for 5:53. The music video for the track shows the band snowboarding down St. Anton. Whilst many of the David Morales mixes remain unreleased in the United Kingdom, an edited version of the True Power Mix was available in the region on a mini 3-inch CD, only available through the Coca-Cola Euro '96 promotion.

== Critical reception ==
Larry Flick wrote in a Billboard magazine review of the single, "Jamiroquai complements a horn-riddled funk throwdown with savvy remixes that flirt with mainstream house and hip-hop concepts without eliminating the quirky tone of the original version." Pan-European magazine Music & Media commented, "When J.K quotes his master by saying "now I get that sunshine in my life", we don't have to tell you what the best track off Space Cowboy sounds like. Wonderful, of course, and soulful." Roger Morton from NME felt it "gets its funky piano ass out to expose some sunshine-of-my-life spiritedness".

== Track listings ==
- UK CD single
1. "Light Years" (edit) – 3:59
2. "Scam" (live) – 5:13
3. "Journey to Arnhemland" (live) – 5:39
4. "We Gettin' Down" (live) – 9:31
- US 12-inch vinyl

A1. "Light Years" (Way Gone Mix)
A2. "Light Years" (True Power Mix)
B1. "Light Years" (4 to Da Floor Mix)
B2. "Light Years" (album version)
B3. "Light Years" (album instrumental)

== Charts ==
Chart (1995–1996)	Peak position
Australia (ARIA)	112
US Dance Club Songs (Billboard)	6
US Dance Singles Sales (Billboard)	38

== Release history ==
Region	Date	Format(s)	Label(s)	Ref.
United Kingdom	20 February 1995	12-inch vinyl; CD; cassette	Sony Soho Square	
Australia	20 March 1995	CD; cassette	Sony Soho Square	
Japan	21 May 1995	CD	Epic	
United States	13 February 1996	Rhythmic contemporary radio	Work	
