= Emergency on Planet Earth (song) =

1993 single by Jamiroquai

Single by Jamiroquai

from the album Emergency on Planet Earth
- B-side: "If I Like It, I Do It" (acoustic); "Revolution 1993" (demo)
- Released: 2 August 1993
- Genre: Funk
- Length: 3:34
- Label: Sony Soho Square
- Songwriters: Jay Kay; Toby Smith
- Producer: Mike Nielsen

Jamiroquai singles chronology
| "Blow Your Mind" (1993) | "Emergency on Planet Earth" (1993) | "The Kids" (1993) |

Music video
- "Emergency on Planet Earth" on YouTube

"Emergency on Planet Earth" is a song by British funk/acid jazz band Jamiroquai, released in August 1993 by Sony Soho Square as the fourth and final single from the band's debut studio album of the same name (1993). The song was written by frontman Jay Kay, and has an environmentalist tone, urging the listener to "stop modernisation going on." The track peaked at number 14 on the UK Singles Chart and at number four on the US Dance Chart.

A remix of the song, which uses a completely different bass track and intro, and includes some changes in the arrangements, was featured on the single, and in the music video for the song, which was directed by W.I.Z. This version was later released on the group's greatest hits compilation, High Times: Singles 1992–2006.

== Composition ==
"Emergency on Planet Earth" is in the key of B flat major. Kay's voice in the song ranges in pitch from F4 to B♭5.

== Critical reception ==
Larry Flick from Billboard magazine wrote, "U.K. acid jazz/funk act is given a second shot at stateside acceptance with this house-fried throwdown." He added further, "Remixer Danny Tenaglia lays a crafty groove beneath the song that will work for discerning DJs, but maintains the integrity of the song and vocal. At a time when post-production seems to mean tossing out the entire track and starting all over, this is a nice change of pace. Deserves a shot." In his weekly UK chart commentary, James Masterton deemed it "another piece of soul-funk revival". Caitlin Moran from Melody Maker said, "This is the first time I've ever listened to Jamiroquai, and blow me down with a libel writ, but it sounds exactly like Stevie Wonder."

Alan Jones from Music Week gave the song a score of four out of five, noting, "A cinematic widescreen intro ushers in a typical but slightly more uptempo retro-funk workout, complete with period electronic squelching that lopes purposefully under some fine vocal emoting." Ian McCann from NME wrote, "Far better than the last one, in that it moves along a bit, but it isn't exactly catchy." James Hamilton from the Record Mirror Dance Update described it as "another uncompromisingly late Seventies style jazz-funk burbler" in his weekly dance column. Stuart Maconie from Select complimented it as "excellent". Tony Cross from Smash Hits also gave the song four out of five, stating that "this is still strong stuff and the message is as important as the music – a green warrior that pop can be proud of."

== Music video ==
The accompanying music video for "Emergency on Planet Earth" was directed by W.I.Z. and features outer space extravaganza shot on motion control. It depicts the members of Jamiroquai on a spaceship, resembling the Sith spaceship from Star Wars: A New Hope, receiving a video message from Jay Kay, who is singing and dancing in the middle of nowhere. The video was produced by Kim Mnguni for Medialab and released on 2 August 1993. It was later made available on YouTube in 2009 and had generated more than 4.4 million views as of June 2025.

== Track listing ==
- UK CD single
1. "Emergency on Planet Earth" – 3:39
2. "Emergency on Planet Earth" (extended version) – 4:12
3. "If I Like It, I Do It" (acoustic) – 4:26
4. "Revolution 1993" (demo) – 10:19

== Charts ==
| Chart (1993–94) | Peak position |
|---|---|
| Europe (Eurochart Hot 100) | 95 |
| Europe (European Dance Radio) | 20 |
| UK Singles (OCC) | 14 |
| UK Airplay (Music Week) | 26 |
| UK Dance (Music Week) | 13 |
| UK Club Chart (Music Week) | 63 |
| US Dance Club Songs (Billboard) | 4 |
