= Laurence Grafftey-Smith =

British diplomat (1892–1989)

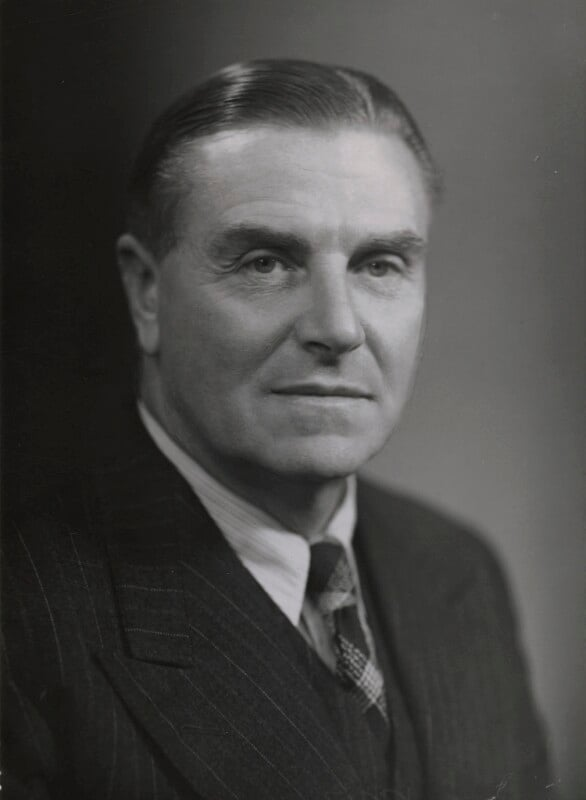
Grafftey-Smith in 1950

Sir Laurence Barton Grafftey-Smith KBE, KCMG (16 April 1892 – 3 January 1989) was a British diplomat. He was a member of the British Consular Service from 1916 to 1947.

His grandson was musician Toby Smith.

== Early life ==
Born to parents Revd. Arthur Grafftey-Smith and Mabel Grafftey-Smith (née Barton), he was educated at Clifton College, Repton School and Pembroke College, Cambridge.

== Career ==
His posts included being the British High Commissioner in Karachi, Pakistan (1947–1949). During his tenure, "he warned Pakistani Foreign Minister Sir Zafarullah Khan that an upcoming visit to Moscow (by invitation) would be seen with mistrust by Americans and the British. Prime Minister of Pakistan Liaquat Ali Khan later cancelled the visit." He was Consul-General to Madagascar, Envoy Extraordinary and Minister Plenipotentiary at Jeddah (from 20 October 1945). He was appointed Knight Commander, Order of the British Empire (K.B.E.) and Knight Commander, Order of St. Michael and St. George (K.C.M.G.). In 1970 he published his memoirs of his time in the Middle East, entitled Bright Levant, including a description of his friendship with Saudi King Ibn Saud.
