= Runaway (Jamiroquai song) =

Single by Jamiroquai

from the album High Times: Singles 1992–2006
- B-side: "Runaway" (Tom Belton remix)
- Released: 30 October 2006
- Genre: Funk; disco; pop
- Length: 3:45
- Label: Sony BMG; Columbia
- Songwriters: Jason Kay; Robert Harris; Matthew Johnson
- Producers: Jason Kay; Matthew Johnson; Mike Spencer

Jamiroquai singles chronology
"Hollywood Swinging" (2005)	"Runaway" (2006)	"White Knuckle Ride" (2010)

Music video
- "Runaway" on YouTube

"Runaway" is the only single taken from British acid jazz band Jamiroquai's greatest hits compilation High Times: Singles 1992–2006. The track was released on 30 October 2006. It was their fifth No. 1 on the US Dance Club Songs chart, and it peaked at No. 18 on the UK Singles Chart.

== Background ==
The song's lyrics relate to dispute involving group's record label, Sony BMG, who wanted to cut ties with the band six records into an eight-record deal. Jay Kay confirmed this, following a performance of the song in London's Jazz Cafe in August 2008.

== Music video ==
The video was filmed in London and it has two sections. The first features Jay Kay dancing and singing in his home studio; the second shows a man, later revealed to be Kay, wearing a space suit driving a dune buggy through London with an astronaut suit. The video ends where it starts, with the astronaut exiting at the subway station, the Piccadilly Circus tube station.

== Track listing ==
UK CD1

1. "Runaway" – 3:44
2. "Runaway" (Tom Belton remix edit) – 3:30

UK CD2

1. "Runaway" – 3:44
2. "Runaway" (Tom Belton remix) – 7:11
3. "Runaway" (Grant Nelson remix) – 6:10
4. "Runaway" (Alan Braxe & Fred Falke remix) – 6:37

== Remixes ==
Alan Braxe & Fred Falke mixes

- "Runaway" (Alan Braxe & Fred Falke remix) – 6:38
- "Runaway" (Alan Braxe & Fred Falke dub) – 5:52

Grant Nelson mixes

- "Runaway" (Grant Nelson remix) – 6:10
- "Runaway" (Grant Nelson dub) – 6:10

Tom Belton mixes

- "Runaway" (Tom Belton vocal mix) – 7:14
- "Runaway" (Tom Belton dub) – 7:16
- "Runaway" (Tom Belton remix edit) – 3:30

== Charts ==
=== Weekly charts ===
Weekly chart performance for "Runaway"
Chart (2006–2007)	Peak position
Belgium (Ultratop 50 Flanders)	52
Belgium (Ultratop 50 Wallonia)	57
Finland (Suomen virallinen lista)	19
Italy (FIMI)	4
Netherlands (Single Top 100)	76
Switzerland (Schweizer Hitparade)	12
UK Singles (OCC)	18
US Dance Club Songs (Billboard)	1

=== Year-end charts ===
Year-end chart performance for "Runaway"
Chart (2007)	Position
US Dance Club Songs (Billboard)	4
