= Deeper Underground =

1998 single by Jamiroquai

Single by Jamiroquai

from the album Godzilla: The Album
- B-side: "High Times"
- Released: 20 May 1998
- Length: 4:44 (album version); 3:33 (radio edit)
- Label: Sony Soho Square
- Songwriters: Jason Kay; Toby Smith
- Producer: Rick Pope

Jamiroquai singles chronology
"High Times" (1997)	"Deeper Underground" (1998)	"Canned Heat" (1999)

Music video
- "Deeper Underground" on YouTube

"Deeper Underground" is a single by British funk and acid jazz band Jamiroquai from the soundtrack to the 1998 film Godzilla. The song was written by group members Jason Kay and Toby Smith and was produced by Rick Pope. It was also included as a bonus track on the group's fourth studio album, Synkronized (1999), as well as on the special edition of the group's fifth album, A Funk Odyssey (2001).

Released in Japan on 20 May 1998 and in the United Kingdom two months later, "Deeper Underground" became a hit in several countries, giving Jamiroquai their only number-one single on the UK Singles Chart. As of March 2017, it has sold over 339,100 copies in the UK. This song was one of the last to feature founding bassist Stuart Zender before his departure during the recording of Synkronized.

== Music video ==
Directed by Mike Lipscombe, the music video was used as a promotional tool for the 1998 film Godzilla. Partly shot on location at Grays' State Theatre, it depicts a 3D film theatre in which the movie is being shown. However, as the screen shows Godzilla walking on the ocean floor, one of its feet breaks the screen, causing water to flood into the theatre as if the screen were made of glass and everything behind it were real. The theatre turns into chaos as the audience tries to get out alive, in the midst of which Jay Kay appears and sings and dances on top of the seats. Several other things go through the screen, including a helicopter, cars, and New York taxis. Some stills from the movie are also interspaced between various scenes. At the end of the video, the camera pans out, and it emerges that this entire flood was itself being watched by a different cinema audience on another screen.

In an interview, Jay Kay claimed that the extras were not informed beforehand about the sudden influx of water near the start of the video, so the terrified reactions as they try to escape are actually genuine.

Another version of the video replaces Godzilla with a man in the movie who smashes an aquarium, causing the theatre to flood. The rest of the video is completely identical.

== Track listings ==
UK CD1

1. "Deeper Underground" (radio edit) – 3:33
2. "Deeper Underground" (The Metro Mix) – 6:59
3. "Deeper Underground" (instrumental) – 4:44

UK CD2

1. "Deeper Underground" – 4:44
2. "Deeper Underground" (The Ummah Mix) – 5:01
3. "Deeper Underground" (S-Man Meets Da Northface Killa Dub) – 9:02

UK cassette single and European CD single

1. "Deeper Underground" (radio edit) – 3:33
2. "Deeper Underground" (The Metro Mix) – 6:59

Australian and Japanese CD single

1. "Deeper Underground" (radio edit)
2. "Deeper Underground"
3. "Deeper Underground" (The Metro Mix)
4. "High Times" (radio edit)

== Charts ==
=== Weekly charts ===
Chart (1998)	Peak position
Australia (ARIA)	46
Austria (Ö3 Austria Top 40)	28
Belgium (Ultratop 50 Flanders)	49
Belgium (Ultratop 50 Wallonia)	20
Europe (Eurochart Hot 100)	6
Finland (Suomen virallinen lista)	8
France (SNEP)	24
Germany (GfK)	30
Iceland (Íslenski Listinn Topp 40)	2
Ireland (IRMA)	9
Italy (Musica e dischi)	7
Italy Airplay (Music & Media)	1
Netherlands (Dutch Top 40)	19
Netherlands (Single Top 100)	18
New Zealand (Recorded Music NZ)	33
Scotland Singles (OCC)	1
Spain (AFYVE)	10
Sweden (Sverigetopplistan)	44
Switzerland (Schweizer Hitparade)	9
UK Singles (OCC)	1
US Dance Club Songs (Billboard)	22

=== Year-end charts ===
Chart (1998)	Position
Europe (Eurochart Hot 100)	71
Iceland (Íslenski Listinn Topp 40)	20
UK Singles (OCC)	55

== Certifications and sales ==
Region	Certification	Certified units/sales
United Kingdom (BPI)	Silver	339,100

== Release history ==
Region	Date	Format(s)	Label(s)	Ref.
Japan	20 May 1998	CD	Epic	
United Kingdom	13 July 1998	CD; cassette	Sony Soho Square	
United States	29 September 1998	Contemporary hit radio	Work	
