= Space Cowboy (Jamiroquai song) =

1994 single by Jamiroquai

Single by Jamiroquai

from the album The Return of the Space Cowboy
- B-side: "The Kids"; "Journey to Arnhemland"
- Released: 26 September 1994
- Genre: Funk
- Length: 6:24 (album version); 3:36 (radio edit); 6:32 (Stoned Again Mix/Original version)
- Label: Sony Soho Square
- Songwriter: Jay Kay
- Producer: Jay Kay

Jamiroquai singles chronology
"The Kids" (1993)	"Space Cowboy" (1994)	"Half the Man" (1994)

Music video
- "Space Cowboy" on YouTube

"Space Cowboy" is the international lead single from British funk and acid jazz band Jamiroquai's second studio album, The Return of the Space Cowboy (1994). Released on 26 September 1994, by Sony Soho Square, the single peaked at number 17 on the UK Singles Chart, number six in Italy, and number three in Iceland. In the United States, it gave the band their first number one on the Billboard Hot Dance Club Play chart. In June 2006, it re-entered the UK Dance Chart at number one. The accompanying music video was directed by Vaughan Arnell and Anthea Benton, using motion control photography with multiple versions of frontman Jay Kay and the other band members performing in a blue room. The single also contains remixes by David Morales, which further put the single in club circulation.

== Background ==
Three very distinct but relatively well-known versions of the song exist.

The original iteration was recorded with the band's regular bassist Stuart Zender and uses a slap bass technique during the chorus. This version is commonly known as the "Stoned Again Mix" and was largely the version played on radio when the single was released. The full "Stoned Again Mix" was a B-side on the 12" vinyl single, and a shorter “radio edit” based on the "Stoned Again Mix" is the version included on the band's 'Greatest Hits' album, High Times: Singles 1992–2006. A lengthy rendition of this version is usually the one performed live, sometimes extended to as much as twelve minutes with additional instrumental parts, including wind instruments not on any recorded version.

The album version is noticeably different; it is considerably longer with a different bassline played not by Stuart Zender but by an artist credited as "Mr. X" in the album sleeve notes. Years later, Zender himself revealed on Instagram that the bass player who played on the song was Paul Powell; however, he affirmed that he wrote the original ("Stoned Again Mix") bassline himself.

Thirdly, a house-style remix by David Morales, known as the 'Classic Club Remix' became popular in clubs and appears on many dance/club compilations. This appeared on the US single release and a shorter 'Classic Radio' edit was a B-side on the British CD single release of "Virtual Insanity". David Guetta's song "Stay (Don't Go Away)", featuring Raye, samples this remix.

In April 2024, nearly 30 years after its original mix, Michael Gray released an official remix of "Space Cowboy".

"Space Cowboy" is a frequently covered song, with two notable cover versions: one by Jazzamor, and one by the band Jacarandaa. Cowboy Bebop scriptwriter Keiko Nobumoto said in an interview that the song "Space Cowboy" was one of the inspirations for Cowboy Bebop.

== Critical reception ==
In his weekly UK chart commentary, James Masterton wrote that "Space Cowboy" "deviates little from that winning formula which still does not stop it sounding rather bland to these ears - but a No.17 hit first week out is not to be sniffed at." Pan-European magazine Music & Media commented, "Will the "cap-ophile" neo soul brother be wearing a Stetson for this one? More laidback–or spacy?–than before, he'll be rocketed into the unknown, yet-to-be-explored universum of ACE." It was also described as "ideal radio music". Alan Jones from Music Week noted, "A smooth and slick, downtempo piece of funk with plenty of room for ad-libs and stylish posturings. Augers well for upcoming album."

In his album review, Roger Morton from NME wrote, "Only in the wonky Everything is good/And brown/Oh I'm here again couplets of the concluding 'Space Cowboy' do things get close to bonged out originality." Tim Jeffery from the Record Mirror Dance Update said it's "a cool funky track with the emphasis much more on the lyrics than the dancefloor though its rumbling funky bass cuts through powerfully in places and there's a wild breakdown halfway through that raises the excitement level. Otherwise this is jazzy, radio friendly and very much what you'd expect." Another Record Mirror editor, Tony Farsides, named it one of the "highlights" of the album, while Siân Pattenden from Smash Hits named it the "best stuff" of the album, with "The Kids".

== Music video ==
A music video was filmed for "Space Cowboy" using the single version of the song. It was directed by Vaughan Arnell and Anthea Benton, and mainly featured Jay Kay dancing around a blue room with multiple versions of him and the other band members appearing and disappearing. Occasional breaks show the band members against a blacklight with marijuana-leaf motifs. The video makes use of motion control photography to allow a seemingly-continuous shot as the camera pans around the room. In America, another version of the video replaced the leaves with daisies, without Jay's consent. A video of the David Morales remix also exists. The video of "Space Cowboy" was A-listed on French music television channel MCM and received "buzz bin" rotation on MTV Europe in December 1994.

== Legacy ==
In 2019, the David Morales remix of "Space Cowboy" was ranked among the "17 Best Remixes Ever" by Defected Records. In 2021, British DJ and producer Waze ranked it number 10 in his "10 Best House Classics" in DMY, saying, "Another absolute classic – that riff is undeniable and it's a monster at nearly 8 minutes long. David Morales, another of the founding fathers turning in an NYC retake on a British funk artist."

== Track listings ==
- UK CD single
1. "Space Cowboy" – 3:36
2. "Journey to Arnhemland" – 5:22
3. "The Kids" – 5:01
4. "Space Cowboy" (demo version) – 4:17
- Europe 12-inch single
1. "Space Cowboy" (edit) – 3:46
2. "Journey to Arnhemland" – 5:22
3. "Space Cowboy (Stoned Again Mix)" – 6:32
- Space Cowboy (Michael Gray's Good Vibe Zone) single
1. "Space Cowboy" (Michael Gray's Good Vibe Zone - Edit) – 3:25
2. "Space Cowboy" (Michael Gray's Good Vibe Zone - Extended) – 6:23
3. "Space Cowboy" (Michael Gray's Good Vibe Zone Dub) – 5:48
- US 12-inch single
1. "Space Cowboy" (album version) – 6:24
2. "Space Cowboy" (instrumental) – 3:46
3. "Space Cowboy" (radio edit) – 3:36
4. "Space Cowboy" (Classic Club Remix) – 7:52
5. "Space Cowboy" (Babinstrumental) – 6:45
6. "Space Cowboy" (Classic Radio Remix) – 4:01
- 2006 digital EP
1. "Space Cowboy" (Mayhem & Musaphia Reconstruction Mix) – 8:50
2. "Space Cowboy" (Mayhem & Musaphia Deep Dub) – 7:18

== Charts ==
=== Weekly charts ===
Chart (1994–1995)	Peak position
Australia (ARIA)	109
Belgium (Ultratop 50 Flanders)	49
Europe (Eurochart Hot 100)	72
Europe (European Dance Radio)	3
Europe (European Hit Radio)	28
France (SNEP)	22
Iceland (Íslenski Listinn Topp 40)	3
Italy (Musica e dischi)	6
Scotland Singles (Official Charts)	21
Switzerland (Schweizer Hitparade)	28
UK Singles (Official Charts)	17
UK Airplay (Music Week)	24
UK Dance (Official Charts)	11
US Dance Club Songs (Billboard)	1
US Dance Singles Sales (Billboard)	27

Chart (2006)	Peak position
UK Dance (Official Charts)	1

=== Year-end charts ===
Chart (1994)	Position
UK Singles (OCC)	190

Chart (1995)	Position
Iceland (Íslenski Listinn Topp 40)	51
US Dance Club Play (Billboard)	39

== Certifications ==
Region	Certification	Certified units/sales
United Kingdom (BPI)	Platinum	600,000^{‡}
^{‡} Sales+streaming figures based on certification alone.

== Release history ==
Region	Date	Format(s)	Label(s)	Ref.
United Kingdom	26 September 1994	12-inch vinyl; CD; cassette	Sony Soho Square	
Australia	17 October 1994	CD; cassette	Sony Soho Square	
Japan	21 November 1994	CD	Epic	
United States	8 August 1995	Rhythmic contemporary radio	Work	
