= The Return of the Space Cowboy =

1994 studio album by Jamiroquai

Studio album by Jamiroquai
- Released: 17 October 1994
- Recorded: 1993–1994
- Studio: Townhouse; Battery; Falconer
- Genre: Acid jazz; funk; R&B; soul pop
- Length: 65:44 (CD); 67:42 (LP)
- Label: Sony Soho Square (UK); Work (US); Columbia (Canada); Epic (Japan)
- Producer: Jay Kay; Mike Nielsen

Jamiroquai chronology
Emergency on Planet Earth (1993)	The Return of the Space Cowboy (1994)	Jay's Selection (1996)

Jamiroquai studio album chronology
Emergency on Planet Earth (1993)	The Return of the Space Cowboy (1994)	Travelling Without Moving (1996)

Singles from The Return of the Space Cowboy
- 1. "The Kids" Released: 12 December 1993; 2. "Space Cowboy" Released: 26 September 1994; 3. "Half the Man" Released: 7 November 1994; 4. "Light Years" Released: 20 February 1995; 5. "Stillness in Time" Released: 19 June 1995

The Return of the Space Cowboy is the second studio album by English funk and acid jazz band Jamiroquai. The album was released on 17 October 1994 under Sony Soho Square. The album continues the musical direction of their debut, Emergency on Planet Earth (1993), and is characterised by its complex songwriting as a result of Jay Kay's creative block mid-production. Its lyrics addressed street life, hope, loss, Kay's drug use, and social matters regarding Native Americans and youth protests.

Critical reviews of the album were generally positive, with some considering it an improvement from Jamiroquai's first album. It ranked at number 2 in the UK and was certified platinum in the country, with 1,300,000 copies sold worldwide. Its singles "Half the Man" and "Stillness in Time" reached number 15 and number 9, respectively, on the UK Singles Chart, while "Space Cowboy" and "Light Years" peaked at number 1 and number 6 on the US Dance Charts, respectively. The album was reissued in 2013 in remastered form with bonus material.

== Background and composition ==
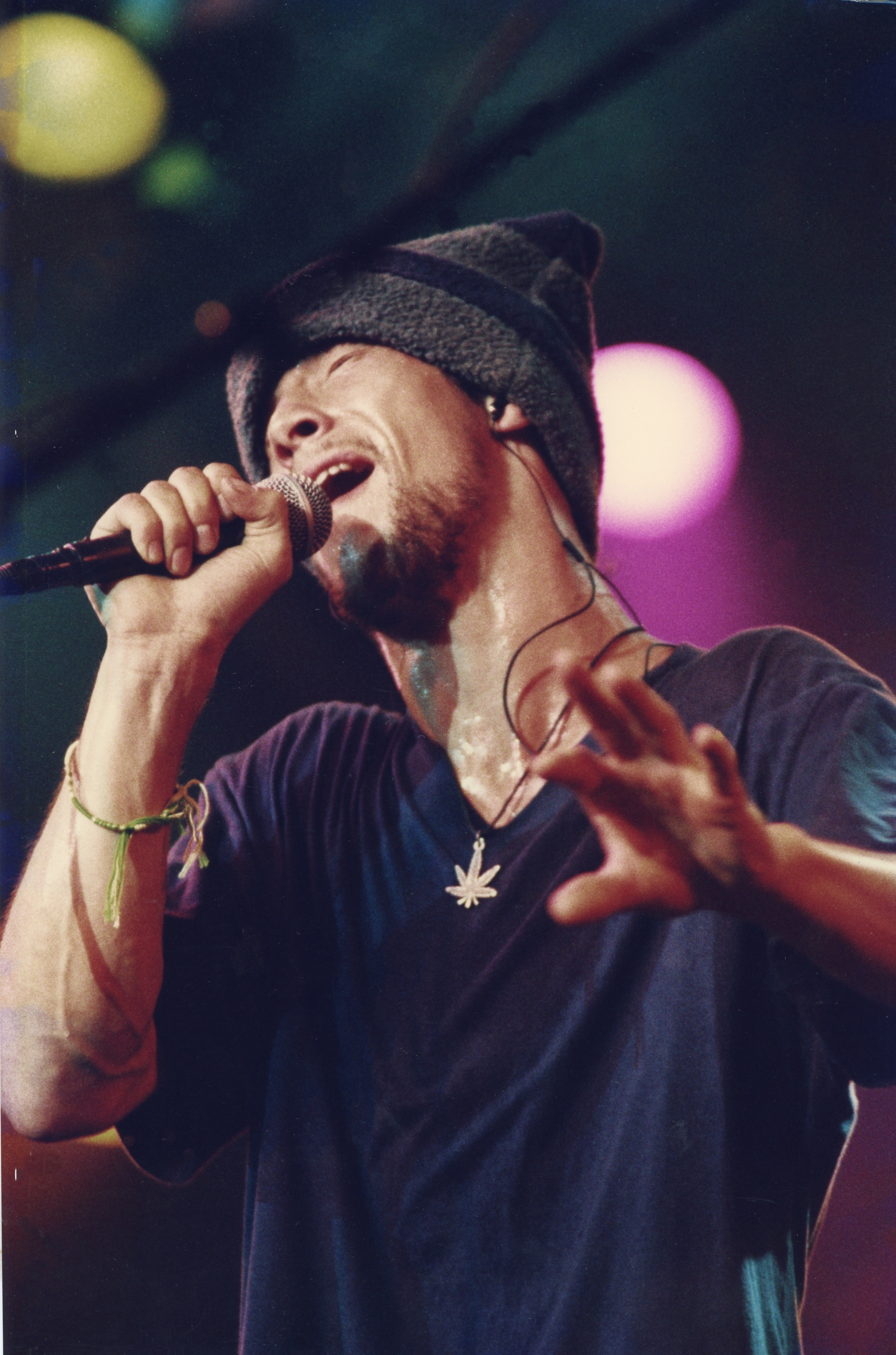
Jay Kay performing with Jamiroquai, c. 1995

Derrick McKenzie auditioned to be the drummer for Jamiroquai by recording the opening track, "Just Another Story", with the band in one take. McKenzie replaced the band's original drummer, Nick Van Gelder, who failed to return from holiday. The track has "a long, squittery, highly rhythmic intro – tight snare drum, Fender Rhodes piano, generic ('70s) synth sound, strings, galloping bass, clonking percussion". In the song, Jay Kay "extemporises a street tale ... midway between rapping and singing."

The album was recorded at Townhouse, Battery, and Falconer studios, all located in London. As the band started to record, Kay suddenly fell into a second-album syndrome worsened by his increasing drug use. The songwriting process was complex for the band, as Kay was often dissatisfied with the results, leading to songs being scrapped or rewritten. He also struggled with writing lyrics "because suddenly I wasn't homeless, I had everything I needed. So I found myself creating problems to write about." The Latin-tinged "Stillness in Time" was written when Kay was at his lowest point in recording the album. He said that "the sweetness of [the song] was really wishful thinking; a hope that things would get better." "Half the Man" is a mid-tempo track about Kay's twin brother who died shortly after birth: "[In] that sense I always have a part of me being missing, but it also doubles up really nicely as a love song".

With the band's songwriting going back and forth between harder and softer songs, they shifted to writing "Light Years", a track Kay described as having a "very heavy vibe". The fifth track, "Manifest Destiny", a mellow song with "a brass-heavy coda", was written when Kay read Bury My Heart at Wounded Knee, telling of the mistreatment and massacres of Native Americans. The sixth track, "The Kids", is an "aggressive" song with "mariachi-band trumpets and snapping bass" meant to "[capture] the feeling of the streets" and is about youth protests against the Criminal Justice and Public Order Act of 1994, a bill that outlaws unrestricted raves. It is the only track on which Van Gelder played drums.

The seventh track, "Mr. Moon", is a love song with "incredibly complex chord structure[s]" about a girl whom Kay met at a rave but ended up with the band's keyboardist Toby Smith. The following track, "Scam", is said to feature orchestral arrangements "with which Rich Tufo and Johnny Pate once draped Curtis Mayfield's soul-protest funk in stark grace". The next track, "Journey To Arnhemland", is an instrumental that features didgeridoo playing. The tenth track, "Morning Glory", is, according to BBC Music, "laid back, a blissed-out joy; perfect comedown music with percussion darting from speaker to speaker." Halfway through recording the album, Kay found his turning point when he wrote the final track, "Space Cowboy", while his drug use was "completely out of control and I was losing my mind". He further said in 2013:

Everyone thinks it's a nice song about getting stoned... but for me it went much deeper... Is it about me or someone else? Is it about marijuana or cocaine? What it was about was someone who was very lost, trying to hang on and come back before he drifted off into a blackhole never to be seen again ... ['Space Cowboy' gave us] the momentum to push on and finish what I still think is one of our most creative and accomplished albums.

== Release ==
The Return of the Space Cowboy was released on 17 October 1994 under Sony Soho Square. In the United States, it released in 1995 under the Work Group. The album reached number 2 in the UK Album Chart and was certified platinum, indicating it has sold 300,000 copies in the country. In France, it was number 4 in its SNEP Album Charts, selling 347,000 copies. In the country's year end chart, it ranked number 31. The album peaked at number 9 in the Swiss Album Charts, where it was certified gold. In Japan, it ranked number 23 in the Oricon Charts, receiving a Platinum certification. The album reached number 37 in the Dutch Album Top 100 and sold 50,000 copies, certifying it as gold. Overall, the album sold 1,300,000 copies. In 2013, The Return of the Space Cowboy was one of the first three albums to be re-issued on the band's 20th anniversary campaign, also containing a bonus disc containing remixes and b-sides.

"Space Cowboy" was released as the album's international lead single on 26 September 1994. The single peaked at number 17 on the UK Singles Chart and was their first number one on the US Dance Chart. The single contains remixes by David Morales, which further put the single in club circulation. "Half the Man" was released as the album's third overall single, on 7 November 1994. The track reached number 15 on the UK Singles Chart. "Light Years" was released as the album's fourth overall single on 20 February 1995. In the United States, the song was number six on the Dance Chart. "Stillness in Time" was the album's fifth overall single, released on 19 June 1995. The track peaked at number nine on the UK Singles Chart, making it the group's highest-charting release to that date. "The Kids" and "Morning Glory" have also been released as singles.

== Reception ==
Professional ratings
Retrospective reviews
Review scores
Source	Rating
AllMusic	4.5/5 stars
Encyclopedia of Popular Music	4/5 stars
Q	3/5 stars
The Rolling Stone Album Guide	2/5 stars
Uncut	7/10

Professional ratings
Contemporary reviews
Review scores
Source	Rating
Entertainment Weekly	B+
The Guardian	3/4 stars
NME	6/10
Orlando Sentinel	3/5 stars
Record Mirror	4/5 stars
Rolling Stone	4/5 stars
Select	4/5
Smash Hits	4/5 stars

Critics have said The Return of the Space Cowboy continues the style of Jamiroquai's 1993 album Emergency on Planet Earth, and some have considered it an improvement in comparison, with Daryl Easlea writing it "captures this first phase of Jamiroquai at their very best." John Bush of AllMusic said the album "offered a better set of songs and more ambitious musical themes ... Jason Kay's dead-on impression of Stevie Wonder and Sly Stone drives the group's blend of acid jazz and funky R&B" Paul Evans of Rolling Stone wrote, "Jamiroquai parlay jazzy soul pop so tight it crackles ... Nowadays, when most funk comes out of cans, Jamiroquai's live spark glows." Evans also said the album "recall[s] Roberta Flack and Weather Report", and a reviewer of Musician compared it to both Wonder and Mandrill: "with its vintage keyboards, jazz harmonies and fondness for rambling, jam-oriented arrangements". Entertainment Weekly described the band as "a funk-making machine with a bright future in the past", while The Source said that they "may still be light years ahead of the hip-hop world." Writing of the lyrics, Sonia Murray of The Atlanta Constitution opined that "Jamiroquai challenges our numb response to violence, the lure of material trappings, even 'the shame of [his] ancestry' with a spirit so unencumbered and personal that these searing messages feel like engaging talks over coffee."

Neil Spencer of The Guardian commented: "Most of this second album still sounds like vintage Stevie Wonder and Johnny 'Guitar' Watson, but Kay's vocals are as snappy and engaging as his extrovert persona". David Sinclair wrote that the album "combines intricate arrangements with several long, free-form workouts crammed with virtuoso performances." He also considers Stuart Zender's bass-playing "the most telling contribution to the album's relentless bustle and drive." He however wrote that "the album is marred by a tendency to substitute technique for tunes." Andy Gill of The Independent found several of the tracks too long. In a negative review, Mark Jenkins of The Washington Post described the album as "one of 1995's least digestible servings of leftovers."

== Track listing ==
All tracks are written by Jay Kay and Toby Smith, except where noted.

Standard edition (Note: US releases switch the tracks "Just Another Story" and "Space Cowboy".)
No.	Title	Writer(s)	Length
1.	"Just Another Story"		8:49
2.	"Stillness in Time"		4:15
3.	"Half the Man"		4:48
4.	"Light Years"		5:53
5.	"Manifest Destiny"		6:19
6.	"The Kids"		5:08
7.	"Mr. Moon"	Kay; Smith; Stuart Zender	5:28
8.	"Scam"	Kay; Zender; Smith	7:00
9.	"Journey to Arnhemland" (instrumental)	Kay; Wallis Buchanan; Smith	5:19
10.	"Morning Glory"	Kay; Zender	6:21
11.	"Space Cowboy"	Kay	6:25
Total length:			65:44

Japanese edition bonus track
No.	Title	Writer(s)	Length
12.	"Space Cowboy" (Stoned Again Mix)	Kay	6:32
Total length:			72:16

American edition bonus track
No.	Title	Length
12.	"Light Years" (Live at the Theatre Du Moulin, Marseille, December 1994)	5:53
Total length:		71:37

20th anniversary reissue bonus disc
No.	Title	Writer(s)	Length
1.	"Light Years" (4 to Da Floor Mix)		5:21
2.	"Space Cowboy" (David Morales Mix)	Kay	7:51
3.	"Space Cowboy" (Demo)	Kay	4:18
4.	"Morning Glory" (instrumental)	Kay	6:21
5.	"Stillness in Time" (Edit)		4:15
6.	"Space Clav"	Smith; Zender; Gary Barnacle	4:54
7.	"Light Years" (Live at the Theatre Du Moulin, Marseille, December 1994)		5:53
8.	"Scam" (Live)	Kay; Zender	5:13
9.	"Journey to Arnhemland" (Live)	Kay; Smith; Buchanan	5:19
10.	"We Gettin' Down" (Live)		9:46
Total length:			58:25

French edition bonus disc
No.	Title	Writer(s)	Length
1.	"Space Cowboy" (Classic Radio)	Kay	4:00

LP edition
No.	Title	Length
2.	"Stillness in Time" (Vinyl Version)	6:13
Total length:		67:42

== Personnel ==
Credits adapted from album liner notes.

Jamiroquai

- Jay Kay – vocals
- Toby Smith – keyboards
- Stuart Zender – bass
- Derrick McKenzie – drums
- Wallis Buchanan – didgeridoo

Additional musicians

- Nick Van Gelder – drums (track 6)
- Simon Katz – electric guitar (tracks 4, 7)
- Jeffrey Scantlebury – percussion (track 9)
- Maurizio Ravalico – percussion
- Gary Barnacle – saxophone
- Richard Edwards – trombone
- John Thirkell – trumpet
- Matthew Scrivener – violin
- Iain Mackinnon – violin
- Owen Little – viola
- Robert Bailey – cello
- Colin Davy, Sean Quinn, Komodo, DC Lee – backing vocals (track 1)

Production

- Jay Kay – production, arrangement, engineering
- Michael Nielsen – engineer, co-producer
- Al Stone – additional recording (vocals), mixing
- Adrian Bushby – engineering (track 11)
- Martin Harrison – mixing on "Light Years" (Live at the 'Theatre du Moulin', Marseille, December 1994)
- Creative Hands – design
- Eddie Monsoon – photography
- Chris Nash – photography

== Charts ==
=== Weekly charts ===
Weekly chart performance for The Return of the Space Cowboy
Chart	Position
Australian Albums (ARIA)	42
Austrian Albums (Ö3 Austria)	22
Dutch Albums (Album Top 100)	37
French Albums (SNEP)	119
German Albums (Offizielle Top 100)	37
Japanese Albums (Oricon)	23
Scottish Albums (OCC)	11
Swedish Albums (Sverigetopplistan)	17
Swiss Albums (Schweizer Hitparade)	9
UK Albums (OCC)	2

=== Year-end charts ===
Year-end chart performance for The Return of the Space Cowboy
Chart (1993)	Position
French Albums (SNEP)	31

== Certifications and sales ==
Certifications and sales for The Return of the Space Cowboy
Region	Certification	Certified units/sales
France (SNEP)	Platinum	300,000^{*}
Japan (RIAJ)	Platinum	200,000^{^}
Netherlands (NVPI)	Gold	50,000^{^}
Switzerland (IFPI Switzerland)	Gold	25,000^{^}
United Kingdom (BPI)	Platinum	300,000^{^}
Summaries
Worldwide	—	1,300,000
^{*} Sales figures based on certification alone.^{^} Shipments figures based on certification alone.
