= Toby Smith =

English musician (1970–2017)

Background information
- Born: Toby Grafftey-Smith; 29 October 1970
- Origin: London, England
- Died: 11 April 2017 (aged 46)
- Genres: Funk; pop; acid jazz; soul
- Occupations: Keyboardist; songwriter; music producer
- Instrument: Keyboards
- Years active: 1992–2017
- Labels: EMI (1993–2017)

Toby Grafftey-Smith (29 October 1970 – 11 April 2017), known professionally as Toby Smith, was an English musician, most famous for being the keyboardist and co-songwriter for Jamiroquai from 1992 to 2002.

== Background and personal life ==
Son of John Jeremy ("Jinx") Grafftey-Smith, a merchant banker, and his wife Lucy, Smith was educated at Marlborough College, where he developed his musical skills. His grandfather, Sir Laurence Grafftey-Smith, was a diplomat who served as High Commissioner for the U.K. in Pakistan from 1947 to 1951 and Ambassador to Saudi Arabia from 1945 to 1947.

Smith was married to Gabriella, daughter of David Offley Crewe-Read; they had three children.

== Career ==
While Jay Kay was forming Jamiroquai, he was encouraged by his manager to enlist Smith. Having been with the band since 1992, Smith left Jamiroquai on 29 April 2002 during the Funk Odyssey tour due to family commitments.

He was the music producer and manager for the English pop rock band The Hoosiers. Smith produced the 2009 album Caught in the Headlights for the British band Absent Elk. In 2013, he co-produced Matt Cardle's third album, Porcelain, as well as providing writing contributions to several songs.

He owned Angelic Recording Studios based near Banbury.

== Death ==
Smith died on 11 April 2017, having been diagnosed with cancer six years earlier. He was 46 years old.

== Discography ==
- Emergency on Planet Earth (1993)
- The Return of the Space Cowboy (1994)
- Travelling Without Moving (1996)
- Synkronized (1999)
- A Funk Odyssey (2001)
