= S2 Records =

Sony S2 Records
- Parent company: Sony Music Entertainment
- Founded: 1991; 35 years ago
- Founder: Lincoln Elias; Muff Winwood
- Defunct: 2004; 22 years ago
- Status: Defunct
- Genre: Various
- Country of origin: United Kingdom

Sony S2 Records, formerly named as S2 Records and Sony Soho Square (typeset as Sony Soho^{2}), was a subsidiary of Sony Music Entertainment (SME), which operated as a record label in the 1990s and early 2000s.

Sony Soho Square was named after its location at London's Soho Square, with Lincoln Elias (who went on to become the Managing Director of Virgin Records in 2006 and now works with PMR Records) being the founder of the label. It was later headed by Muff Winwood, brother of musician Steve Winwood, who had worked at CBS Records/Sony Music Entertainment since the later 1970s.

Sony S2 featured bands and singers such as Jamiroquai, Des'ree, Reef, Jimmy Ray and others.

In 2004 after SME and BMG (the original major label Bertelsmann Music Group) merged, Sony S2 was dissolved into Sony BMG Music Entertainment UK. At this point many of the bands on Sony S2 were dropped, with Jamiroquai's records going on to be released on the Sony BMG label, with marketing taken on by Columbia Records.

== See also ==
- List of record labels
