= Jamiroquai =

English acid jazz band

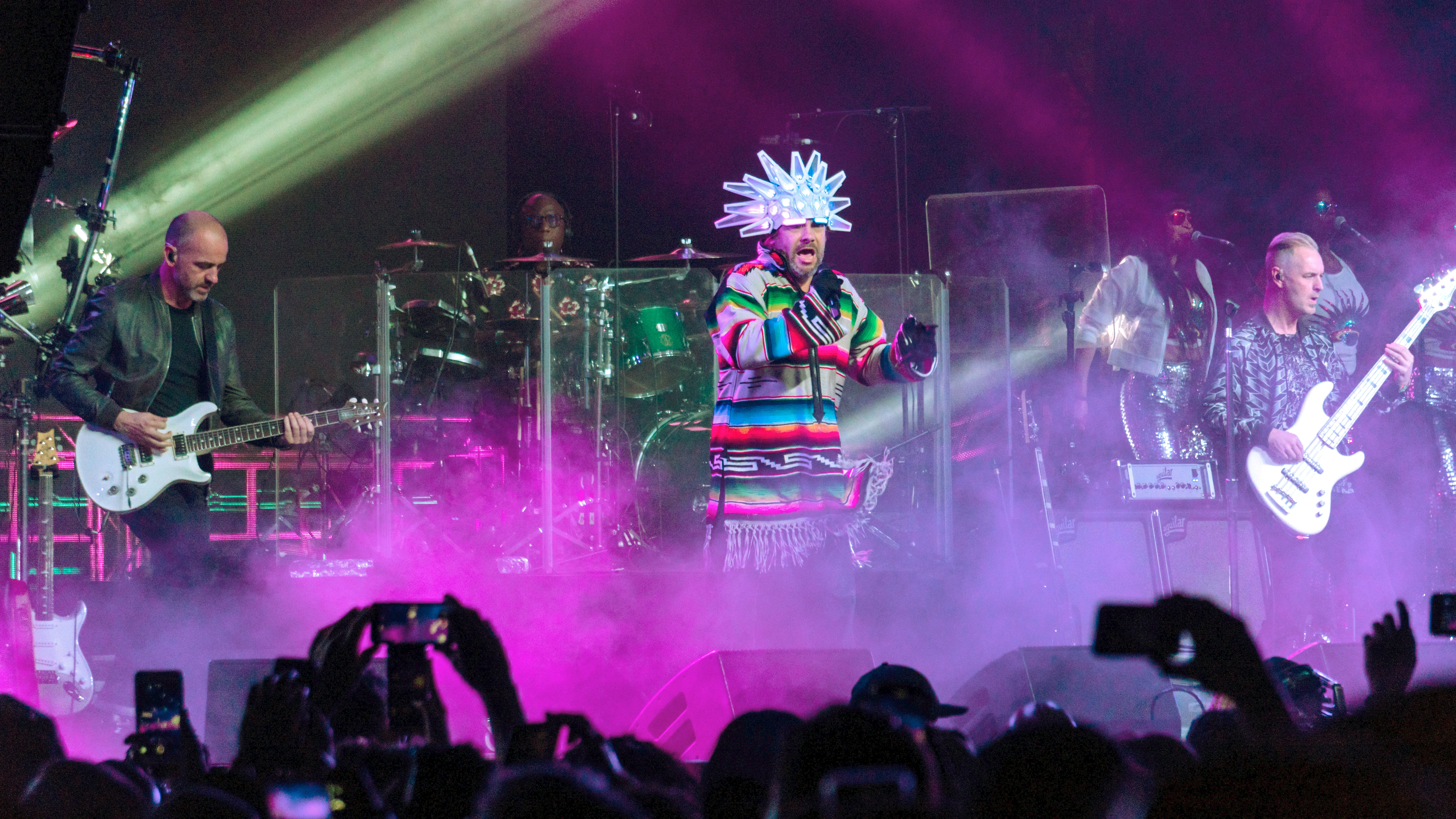
- Jamiroquai performing at Coachella 2018

Background information
- Origin: London, England
- Genres: Funk; acid jazz; soul; disco; house; R&B
- Works: Discography
- Years active: 1992–present
- Labels: Acid Jazz; Sony Soho Square; Work; Epic; Mercury; Virgin EMI; BMG
- Members: Jay Kay; Nick van Gelder; Derrick McKenzie; Rob Harris; Matt Johnson; Paul Turner; Valerie Etienne; Hazel Fernandez; Romina Johnson; Sara De Santis; Fabio De Oliveira
- Past members: Stuart Zender; Toby Smith; Wallis Buchanan; Sola Akingbola; Simon Katz; Nick Fyffe; Nate Williams; Howard Whiddett; Elle Cato
- Website: jamiroquai.com

Jamiroquai (/dʒəˈmɪrəkwaɪ/ jə-MIRR-ə-kwy) are an English acid jazz and funk band from London. Formed in 1992, they are fronted by vocalist Jay Kay, and were prominent in the London-based funk and acid jazz movement of the 1990s. They built on their acid jazz sound in their early releases and later drew from rock, disco, electronic and Latin music genres. Lyrically, the group have addressed social and environmental justice. Kay has remained the only constant member through several line-up changes.

The band made their debut under Acid Jazz Records but subsequently found mainstream success under Sony. While under the label, three of their studio albums charted at number one on the UK Albums Chart—Emergency on Planet Earth (1993), Synkronized (1999), and A Funk Odyssey (2001)—as did their compilation album High Times: Singles 1992–2006 (2006), while their single "Deeper Underground" (1998) topped the UK Singles Chart.

Jamiroquai were the third-best-selling UK act of the 1990s, after the Spice Girls and Oasis. As of 2026, Jamiroquai have sold more than 26 million albums worldwide. Their third album, Travelling Without Moving (1996), received a Guinness World Record as the best-selling funk album in history. The music video for its second single, "Virtual Insanity", (Note: "Do U Know Where You're Coming From" was technically issued first as a collaborative single with M-Beat in June 1996, making "Virtual Insanity" the album's lead solo single.) also contributed to the band's success. The song was named Video of the Year at the 1997 MTV Video Music Awards and earned the band a Grammy Award at the 40th Annual Grammy Awards in 1998.

== History ==
=== 1992–1995: Formation, Emergency on Planet Earth and The Return of the Space Cowboy ===
Before forming Jamiroquai, Jay Kay sent songs to record companies, including a hip-hop single released in 1986 under the label StreetSounds. During this time, Kay was influenced by Native American and First Nations peoples and their philosophies; this led to the creation of "When You Gonna Learn", a song covering social issues. After he had it recorded, Kay fought with his producer, who took out half of the lyrics and produced the song based on what was charting at the time. With the track restored to his preference, the experience helped Kay realise he "wanted a proper live band with a proper live sound". The band would be named "Jamiroquai", a portmanteau of the words "jam" and the slightly altered name of the Native American confederacy known as the Iroquois. Kay was signed to Acid Jazz Records in 1991 after he sent a demo tape of himself covering a song by the Brand New Heavies. Kay gradually gathered band members, including Wallis Buchanan, who played the didgeridoo. Kay's manager scouted keyboardist Toby Smith, who joined the group as Kay's songwriting partner. In 1992, Jamiroquai began their career by performing in the British club scene. They released "When You Gonna Learn" as their debut single, charting outside the UK Top 50 on its initial release. In the following year, Stuart Zender became the band's bassist by audition.

After the success of "When You Gonna Learn", the band were offered major-label contracts. Kay signed a one-million-dollar, eight-album record deal with Sony Soho Square. He was the only member under contract, but he would share his royalties with his band members in accordance with their contributions as musicians. Their US releases were issued through the Work Group. (Note: Emergency on Planet Earth was released under Columbia Records.) The band's debut album Emergency on Planet Earth entered atop the UK albums chart. Kevin L. Carter of The Philadelphia Inquirer commented that the album "is full of upbeat, multi-hued pop tunes based heavily in acid jazz, '70s fusion, funk and soul, reggae and world music". With it, the band continued to build their acid-jazz sound in the following years. The album's ecologically charged concept gave Kay press coverage, although Mark Jenkins of The Washington Post found the record's sloganeering "as crude as the music is slick".

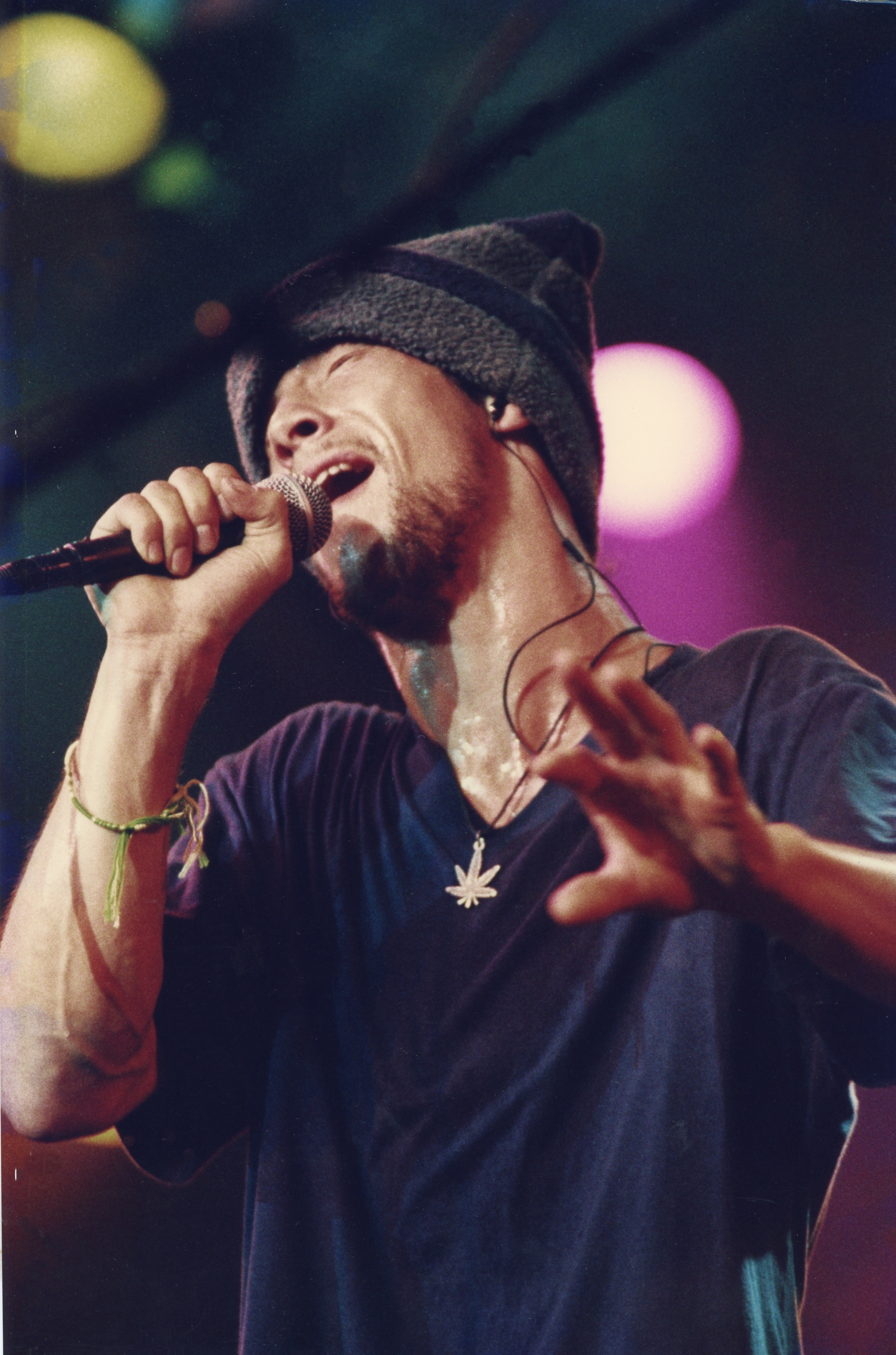
Jay Kay performing with Jamiroquai at the North Sea Jazz Festival in 1995

The band's original drummer, Nick van Gelder, was replaced in 1994 by Derrick McKenzie, who recorded with the group in one take for his audition. They issued their second album, The Return of the Space Cowboy, in 1994, which reached number two in the UK chart. During its recording, Kay was in a creative block, worsened by his increasing drug use at the time, which resulted in its complex songwriting. However, the record was said to have "capture[d] this first phase of Jamiroquai at their very best", according to Daryl Easlea of BBC Music. Josef Woodard from Entertainment Weekly wrote that its "syncopated grooves and horn-lined riffs" were "played by humans, not samplers".

=== 1996–2000: Travelling Without Moving, peak of fame and Synkronized ===
Released in 1996, Travelling Without Moving reached number 24 in the Billboard 200 and number two in the UK albums chart. With more than 8 million copies sold worldwide, it has been listed in Guinness World Records as the best-selling funk album in history since 2001. The album's lead single, "Virtual Insanity", gained popularity for its music video, which was heavily played on MTV. While the album contained symphonic and jungle elements, Kay aimed for a more accessible sound. Ted Kessler of NME saw Travelling Without Moving as an improvement from previous albums, while critic Stephen Thomas Erlewine commented that the songs were not uniformly consistent in comparison.

In 1998, the band released "Deeper Underground" as a single for the Godzilla soundtrack, reaching number one in the UK singles chart. This was the last record to include Zender in the group; he left the band, due to internal conflicts with Kay, while they were preparing their fourth album, Synkronized (1999). While Zender had not been involved in the album's songwriting, the group chose to scrap his recorded tracks to avoid lawsuits, and Nick Fyffe was recruited for new sessions. According to Alex Young of Consequence, this resulted in a "tighter, more angry collection of songs" for Synkronized, alongside a change of musical direction away from creating propulsive, long tunes speaking out against injustice. Some of the album's tracks, including "Canned Heat", display a hi-NRG and house style, while slower tempos on others were said to "ease the pressure for [Kay's] more romantic musings". The album reached number one in the UK albums chart and number 28 in the US Billboard 200.

=== 2001–2009: A Funk Odyssey, Dynamite and subsequent activities ===
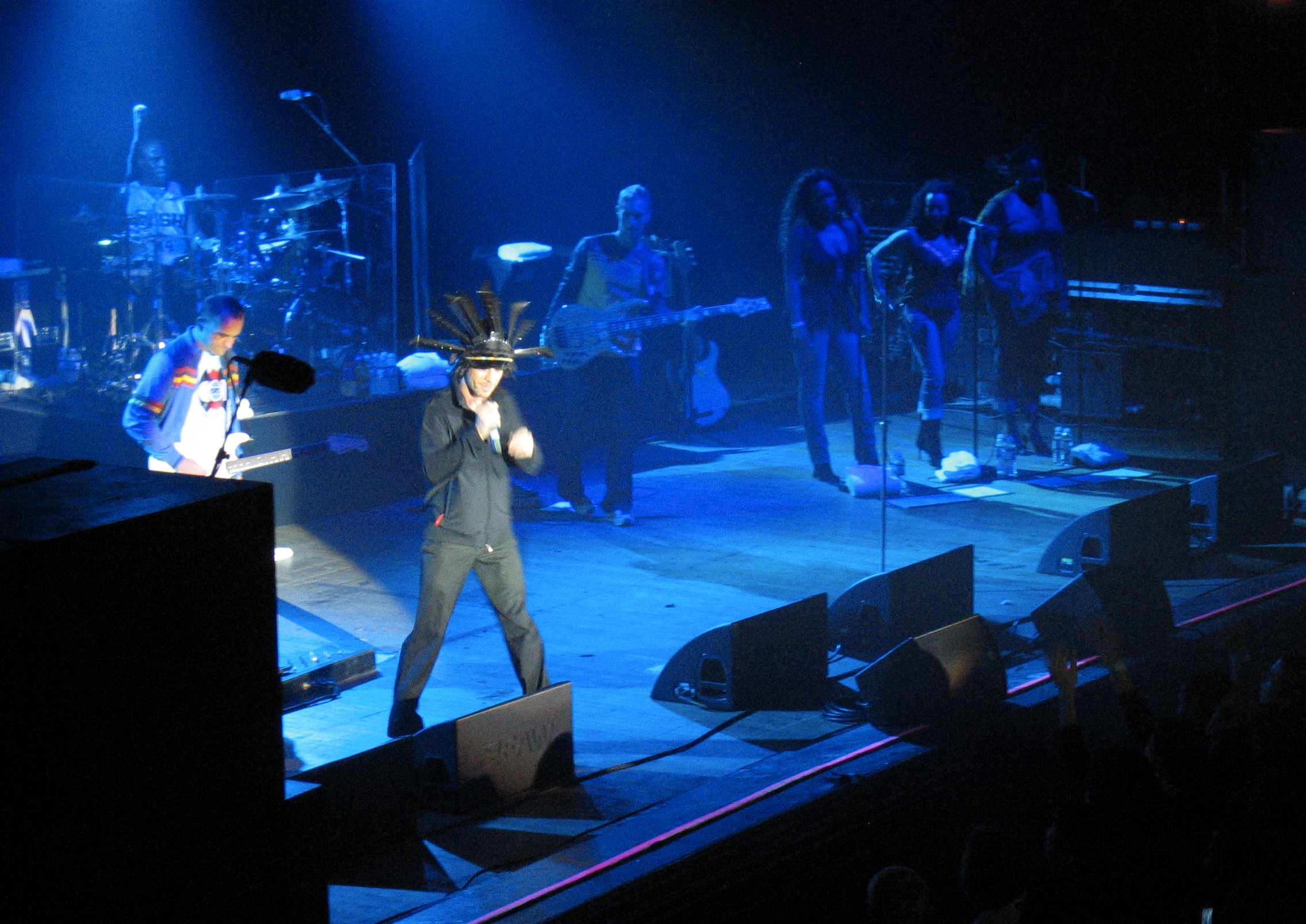
Kay, Harris, McKenzie and Paul Turner performing at the Congress Theater in Chicago, 2005

The group issued their follow-up, A Funk Odyssey, a disco record exploring Latin music influences, in 2001. It introduced guitarist Rob Harris, whose playing in the album "melts seductively into a mix that occasionally incorporates lavish orchestration", according to Jim Abbott of the Orlando Sentinel. Slant Magazine's Sal Cinquemani claimed: "Like its predecessors, Odyssey mixes self-samplage with Jamiroquai's now-signature robo-funk". The album topped the chart in the UK. In the US, under Epic Records, it reached number 44 on the Billboard 200. It was the last album to feature Smith, who left the band in the following year to spend more time with his family.

Their sixth album, Dynamite, was released in 2005 and reached number three in the UK; in the same year, Paul Turner replaced Fyffe as the band's new bassist. Rashod D. Ollison of The Baltimore Sun said the album "boasts a harder digital edge ... With heavier beats, manipulated guitar lines and odd digital textures, Dynamite is less organic than Jamiroquai's other efforts". Its tracks "Feels Just Like It Should" and "Love Blind" were characterised as having "a fatter, dirtier sound than usual". In 2006, Kay's contract with Sony ended, which led to the issue of the band's greatest hits collection, High Times: Singles 1992–2006. It charted at number one in the UK after its first week of release. The following year, Jamiroquai performed at the Gig in the Sky, a concert held on a private Boeing 757 in association with Sony Ericsson. The band thus hold the Guinness World Record for "fastest concert", performed on the aircraft whilst travelling at 1,017 km/h (632 mph).

=== 2010–2019: Rock Dust Light Star and Automaton ===
Rock Dust Light Star was released in 2010 under Mercury Records and charted at number seven in the UK. Kay considered the album a "real band record" that "capture[s] the flow of our live performances". Critics have seen this as a return to their organic funk and soul style, as it forgoes "the electro textures that followed the band into the new millennium", according to Luke Winkie of MusicOMH. It also has a sound Thomas H. Green of The Daily Telegraph described as "Californian Seventies funk rock".

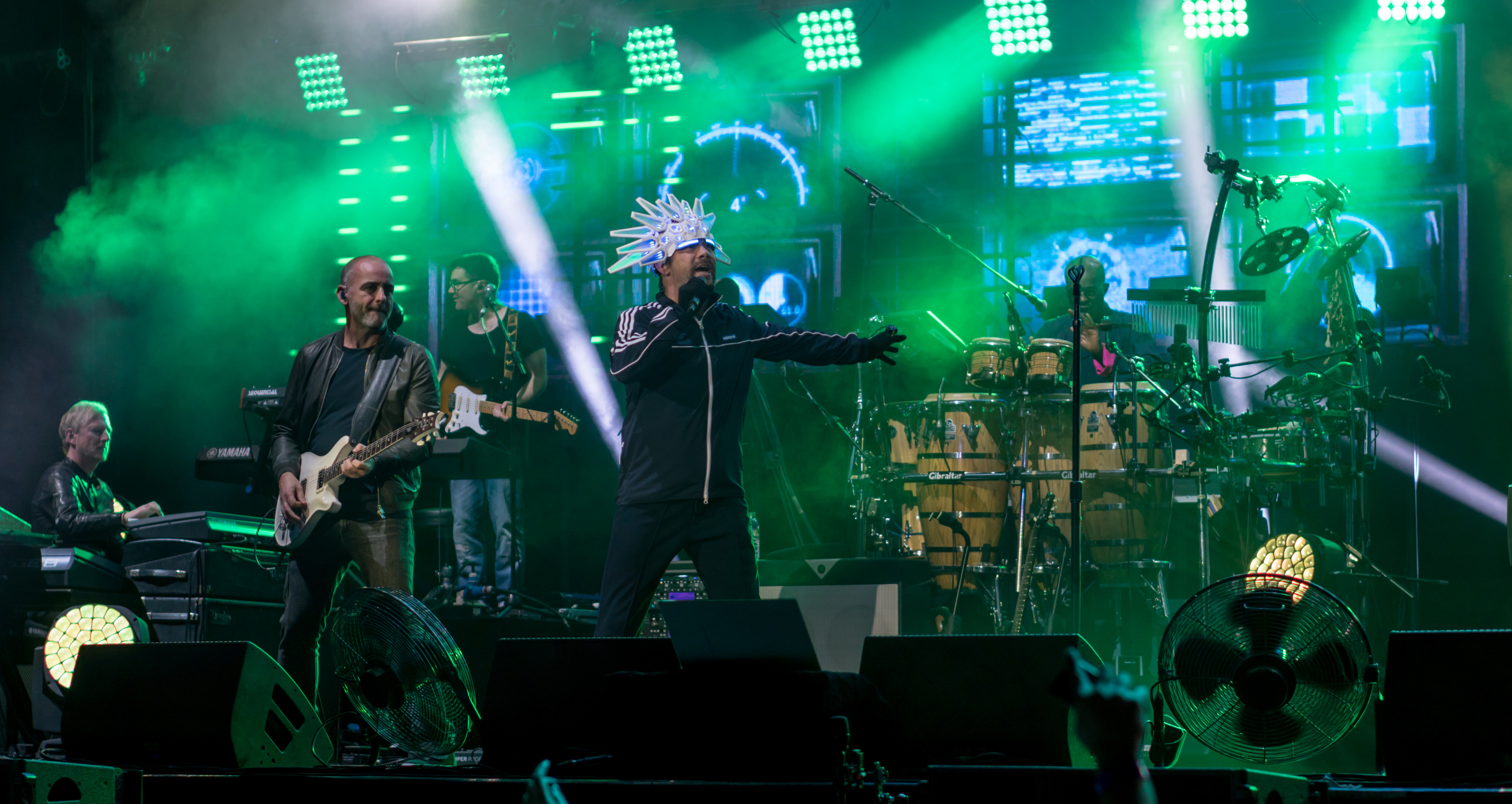
Jamiroquai performing at the O2 in London, 2017. Left to right: Johnson, Harris, Williams, Kay and Akingbola.

Jamiroquai released their 2017 album, Automaton, through Virgin EMI. It was their eighth studio album and the first in seven years, reaching number four in the UK. It was produced by Kay and band keyboardist Matt Johnson, and it "carefully balance[s] their signature sound with... EDM, soul and trap sounds", according to Ryan B. Patrick of Exclaim!. Craig Jenkins of Vulture wrote: "Arrangements that used to spill out over horn, flute, didgeridoo, and string accompaniments now lean closer to French house". By 2018, the group's line-up consisted of Kay, Harris, McKenzie, Johnson, Turner, percussionist Sola Akingbola, Nate Williams on guitar and keyboards, and Howard Whiddett on Ableton Live.

=== 2021–present: The Heels of Steel Tour and upcoming ninth studio album ===
Kay announced in the liner notes of the 2021 re-released single "Everybody's Going to the Moon" that the band were working on a new album. On 19 March 2024, Kay announced that recording sessions for the new album were underway. On 18 November 2024, Jamiroquai announced their UK and Europe 2025 tour, The Heels of Steel Tour, which lasted from 6 November to 12 December 2025. It was their first live tour since 2019.

On 25 February 2026, it was announced that Jamiroquai had signed to BMG for the release of their upcoming ninth studio album.

On 11 June 2026, Jamiroquai announced on their official Instagram page that the album was complete and entering the mastering stage. In July, Kay recreated the "Virtual Insanity" music video in partnership with Beefeater 0.0% gin to commemorate the song's 30th anniversary. In August, Kay stated in a Billboard interview that the album would be released by March 2027, describing it as "happier" and "a groove album".Pre-orders opened on 6 November 2026, without an announced title, tracklist, or release date.

== Artistry ==
=== Musical style and influences ===
"Didjital Vibrations"
Sample of "Didjital Vibrations" from the 1996 album Travelling Without Moving. This instrumental track uses ambient didgeridoo sounds.

Jamiroquai's music is generally termed acid jazz, funk, jazz-funk, disco, soul, house, and R&B. Their sound has been described by J. D. Considine as having an "anything-goes attitude, an approach that leaves the band open to anything". Tom Moon wrote that the band "embrac[es] old-school funk, Philly-soul strings, the crisp keyboard sounds of the '70s and even hints of jazz fusion", blending these with "agitated, aggressive dance rhythms to create an easygoing feel that looks both backward and forward". Ben Sisario facetiously commented that Kay and Smith as songwriters "studied Innervisions-era Stevie Wonder carefully, and just about everything the group has recorded sounds like it could in fact have been played by [Wonder] himself".

Kay is the primary songwriter of Jamiroquai. When composing, he sings melodies and beats for band members to transcribe to their instrumentation. The band rely on analogue sounds, such as running keyboards through vintage effects pedals "to get the warmth and the clarity of those instruments". Parry Gettelman of the Orlando Sentinel described Kay's vocals as "not identifiably male or female, black or white". Other writers said Smith's keyboard arrangements were "psychedelic and soulful", comparing Zender's bass playing to the work of Marcus Miller. and Buchanan on didgeridoo was met with either praise or annoyance from critics.

Kay was influenced by Roy Ayers, Herbie Hancock, Lou Donaldson, Grant Green, Sly Stone, Gil Scott-Heron, and hip-hop and its culture. He was introduced to many of these influences by British club DJs within the rare groove scene in the 1980s. "I'd been into Stevie and all that... Then I got into the JBs, Maceo Parker and the Meters... I decided around that time to try to make music built around those loose, open grooves". A 2003 compilation titled Late Night Tales: Jamiroquai under Azuli Records also contains a selection of some of the band's late 1970s R&B, disco and quiet storm influences. Kay and the group have been compared to Stevie Wonder, with some critics accusing the band of copying black artists. In response, Kay said "we never tried to hide our influences". The band referenced these artists while Kay maintained Jamiroquai's own sound: "it's about the style of music you aim for, not the exact sound. If you just sample Barry White or Sly Stone, that's one thing; to get their spirit is different".

=== Lyrics ===
'Virtual Insanity'... was a very prescient song I wrote and things like Dolly the Sheep happened right after. I think the ideas in that song are maybe even more relevant today than they were back then.

— Kay speaking about the track in regard to the group's social topics, 2013

Jamiroquai's lyrics have touched on socially charged themes. Emergency on Planet Earth (1993) revolves around environmental awareness and speaks out against war. The Return of the Space Cowboy (1994) contains themes of homelessness, Native American rights, youth protests, and slavery. "Virtual Insanity" from Travelling Without Moving (1996) is about the prevalence of technology and the replication and simulation of life. It has been cited as social commentary on technology. The lyrics of Automaton (2017) allude to dystopian films and compromised relationships within a digital landscape.

However, critics wrote that the band had focused more on "boy–girl seductions" and "having fun" rather than social justice, and that Kay's interest in sports cars contradicts his earlier beliefs. Kay was reluctant to release Travelling Without Moving (1996), as it adopted a motorcar concept, (Note: The album cover is an homage to the Ferrari logo with the band's "Buffalo Man" logo.) but he added: "just because I love to drive a fast car, that doesn't mean I believe in [destroying the environment]". He also stated in separate interviews he was tired of being a troubadour of social consciousness, and "after a while you realise that people won't boogie and dance to [politics]".

=== Stage and visuals ===
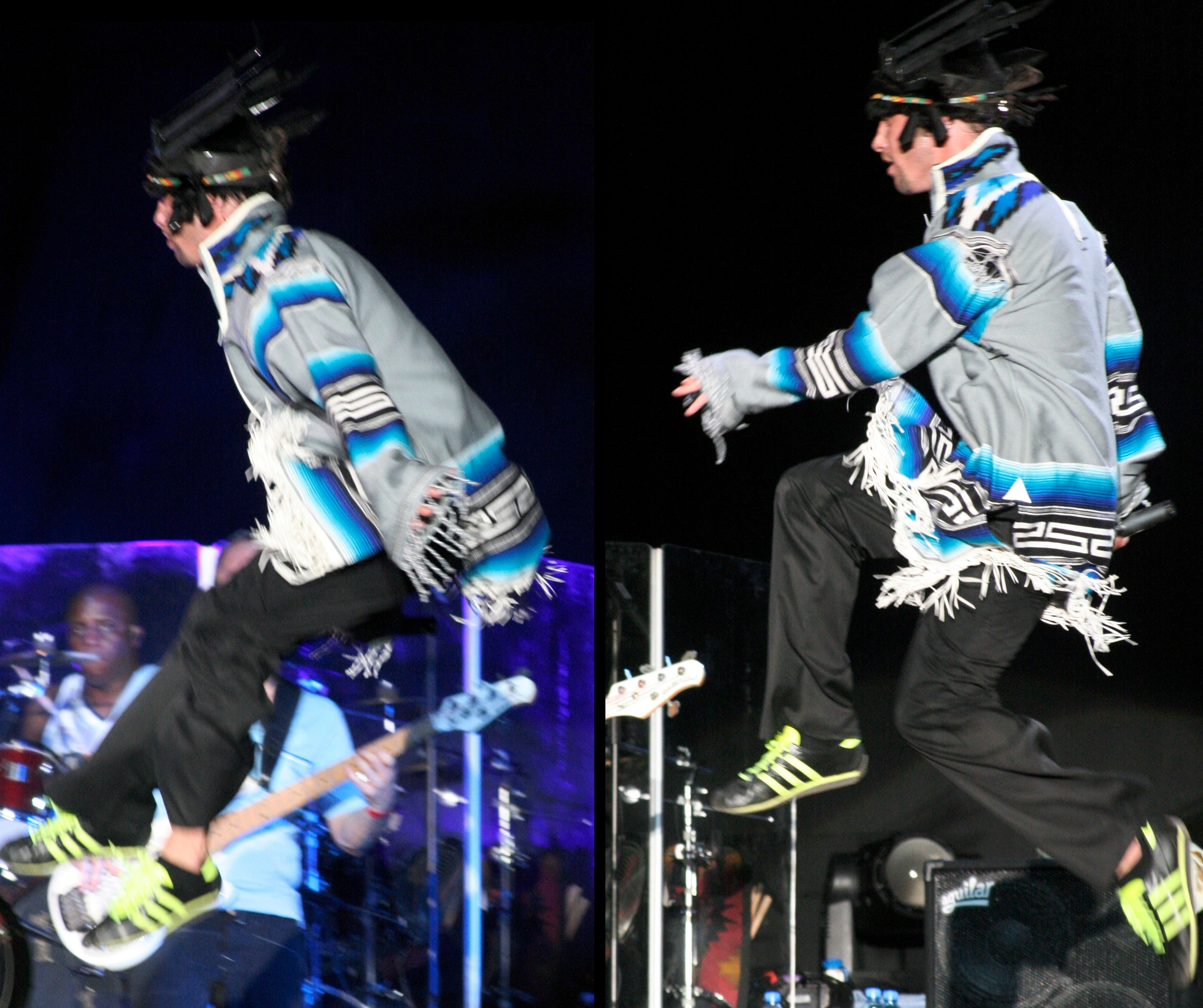
A montage of Kay dancing on stage in 2006

While critics said the group tended towards 1970s funk and soul archetypes in their performances, Kay's presence received praise, with critics noting his strong vocals and energetic dance moves on stage. Robert Hilburn said Kay established a rapport with the audience and has a "disarming sense of humor". Helen Brown of The Telegraph was more critical, writing of a 2011 concert that there was no "deeply personal emotion" in its set list or in Kay's vocals, and "much of the material is exhilarating in the moment, forgettable thereafter".

With their visual style being described as "sci-fi and futuristic", Jamiroquai's music video for "Virtual Insanity" made them "icons of the music-video format", according to Spencer Kornhaber from The Atlantic. It was directed by Jonathan Glazer and depicted Kay performing in a room where the floors, walls and furniture all moved simultaneously.

Kay has worn elaborate headgear, some of which he designed himself. He said that the headgear gives him a spiritual power described by the anthropologists who study Iroquoians as "orenda". The illuminating helmet that appears in the music video for "Automaton" was designed by Moritz Waldemeyer for Kay to control its lights and movements and to portray him as an endangered species. Kay has also worn Native American headdresses, for which he was accused by Native American journalists of culturally misappropriating Native American headwear and language.

== Legacy ==
Miraculously, Jamiroquai managed to survive the acid-jazz crash of the early 90's, when kids traded mellow sounds like the Brand New Heavies, Young Disciples and Guru for the bed-of-nails wails of Nirvana, Soundgarden and Pearl Jam.

— Paper, 1997

Jamiroquai were a prominent component of the London-based funk and acid-jazz movement of the 1990s, with writer Kenneth Prouty saying of them: "few acid jazz groups have reached the level of visibility in the pop music mainstream as London-born Jamiroquai". The success of the 1996 single "Virtual Insanity" led to the climax of "1970s soul and funk that early acid jazz artists had initiated". The band were also credited for popularising the didgeridoo. Artists who mention the group as an influence include Chance the Rapper, SZA, Kamaal Williams, the Internet, Calvin Harris, Tyler, the Creator, Doja Cat, and Dua Lipa. In June 2025, Kay made a guest appearance with Dua Lipa during the Radical Optimism Tour at Wembley Stadium, where they performed "Virtual Insanity".

According to Johnny Sharp of BBC Music, Kay "[became] one of those artists whose music seems somehow fashion-proof, because it's never been in or out of it". Ian Gittins of The Guardian said that the group "have long been shunned by music's tastemakers for a perceived naffness, and have shown their utter disregard for this critical snobbery by getting bigger and bigger". Sisario gave a negative review of the band's discography in The Rolling Stone Album Guide in 2004, finding much of their material to be identical. According to co-writer Keiko Nobumoto, "Space Cowboy" was cited as an influence for the anime Cowboy Bebop. Composer Shoji Meguro also cited Jamiroquai as an influence on the soundtrack of the video game Persona 5.

Jamiroquai were the third-best-selling UK act of the 1990s, after the Spice Girls and Oasis. As of 2026, they have sold more than 26 million albums worldwide. Despite becoming one of the most popular bands in the UK with high-charting albums, the band did not find as much success in the United States. The band's studio albums became less frequently released. Kay said in 2013: "I will only put out an album now when I am inspired to do so".

== Awards and nominations ==
Jamiroquai have received 15 Brit Awarded a nomination for Best Pop Album at the 1998 Grammy Awards and won Best Performance by a Duo or Group for "Virtual Insanity". The band were also nominated for Best Short Form Music Video for "Feels Just Like It Should" at the 48th Annual Grammy Awards in 2006. For their "Virtual Insanity" music video, Jamiroquai had ten nominations at the 1997 MTV Video Music Awards and four wins: Best Visual Effects, Best Cinematography, Best Breakthrough Video, and Video of the Year.

== Members ==
=== Current members ===
- Jay Kay – lead vocals (1992–present)
- Nick van Gelder – drums (1992–1994)
- Derrick McKenzie – drums (1994–present)
- Rob Harris – guitar (2000–present)
- Matt Johnson – keyboards (2002–present)
- Paul Turner – bass (2005–present)
- Valerie Etienne – backing vocals (2001–present)
- Hazel Fernandez – backing vocals (2001–present)
- Romina Johnson – backing vocals (2025–present)
- Sara De Santis – keyboards, Ableton Live (2025–present)
- Fabio De Oliveira – percussion (2025–present)

=== Former members ===
- Stuart Zender – bass (1992–1998)
- Toby Smith – keyboards (1992–2002; died 2017)
- Wallis Buchanan – didgeridoo (1992–2000)
- Sola Akingbola – percussion, backing vocals (1994–2025)
- Simon Katz – guitar (1995–2000)
- Nick Fyffe – bass (1998–2003)
- Nate Williams – guitar, keyboards (2017–2020)
- Howard Whiddett – Ableton Live (2017–2022)
- Elle Cato – backing vocals (2017–2025)

== Discography ==
=== Albums ===
- Emergency on Planet Earth (1993)
- The Return of the Space Cowboy (1994)
- Travelling Without Moving (1996)
- Synkronized (1999)
- A Funk Odyssey (2001)
- Dynamite (2005)
- Rock Dust Light Star (2010)
- Automaton (2017)

=== Tours ===
- Emergency on Planet Earth Tour (1993)
- The Return of the Space Cowboy Tour (1994–1996)
- Travelling Without Moving Tour (1996–1997)
- Synkronized Tour (1999–2000)
- A Funk Odyssey Tour (2001–2002)
- Dynamite Tour (2005)
- Rock Dust Light Star Tour (2010–2014)
- Automaton Tour (2017–2019)
- The Heels of Steel Tour (2025–2026)
- Latin America Tour 2026 (2026)
