= Jay Kay =

English musician (born 1969)

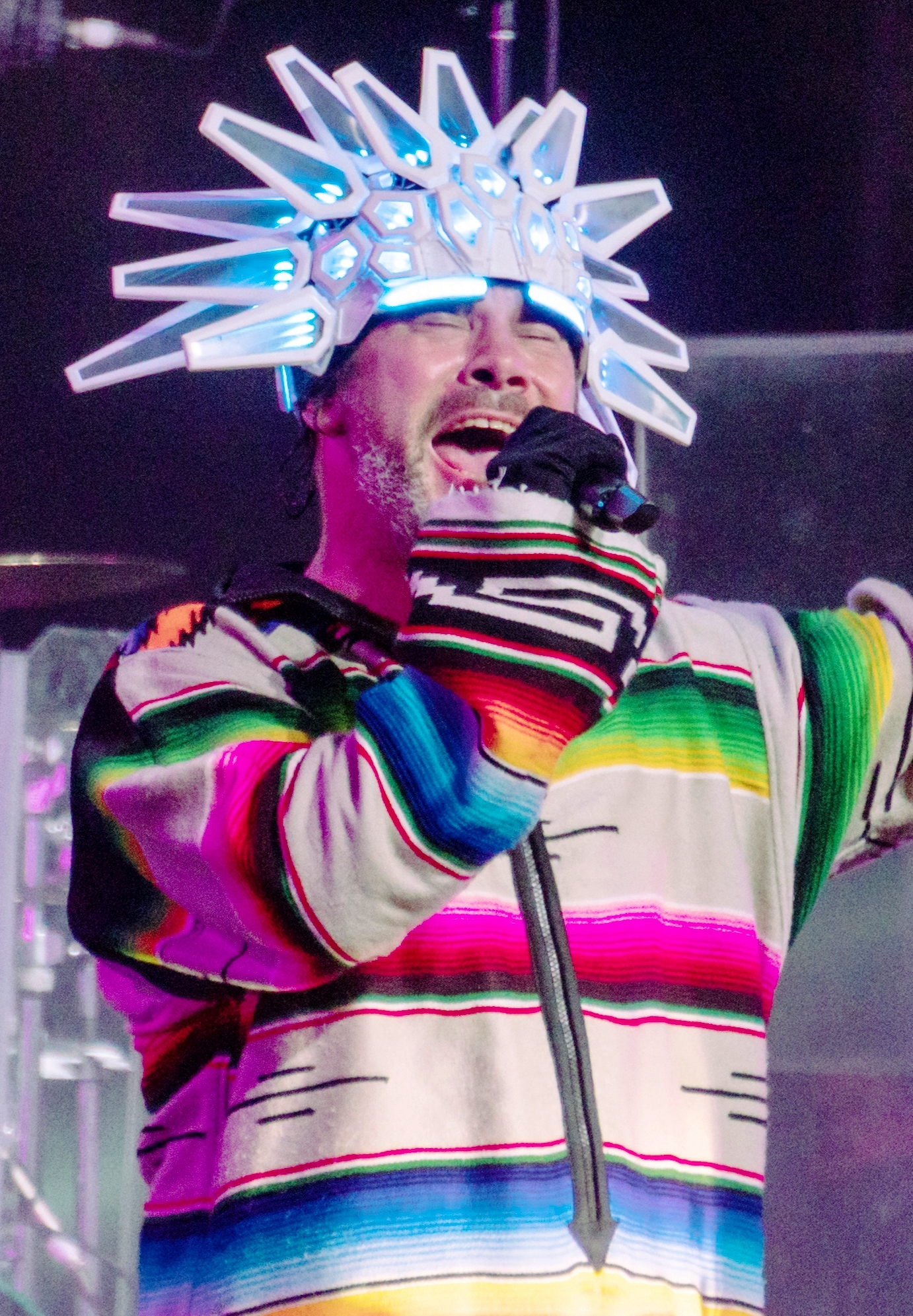
- Kay performing with Jamiroquai at the 2018 Coachella Music Festival
- Born: Jason Luís Cheetham; 30 December 1969 (age 56); Stretford, Lancashire, England
- Occupations: Singer; songwriter
- Years active: 1986–present
- Spouse: Maria Kay
- Partner: Denise van Outen (1998–2001)
- Children: 2
- Mother: Karen Kay
- Musical career
- Genres: R&B; soul; alternative rock; funk; acid jazz
- Member of: Jamiroquai

Jason "Jay" Kay (born Jason Luís Cheetham; 30 December 1969) is an English singer and songwriter who is the co-founder and lead vocalist of the acid jazz and funk band Jamiroquai. As of 2026, the band had sold more than 26 million albums internationally.

Outside music, Kay is known for his interest in luxury cars, and made appearances in the shows Top Gear and Fifth Gear. He has also contributed to environmental causes.

== Early life ==
Jay Kay was born Jason Luís Cheetham in Stretford, Lancashire, on 30 December 1969, to English cabaret singer Karen Kay and Portuguese guitarist Luís Saraiva. His parents split up, and he did not meet his biological father until he was about 28. His identical twin, David, died of brain damage a few weeks after the two were born. Kay said in a 2010 interview that his mother raised him largely alone, and being that she was a cabaret singer, he had "an itinerant childhood", half of which he spent "living in rural Suffolk". Kay attended several boarding schools throughout his childhood, including in Devon as well as in Colchester. He often accompanied his mother at her performances. He and his mother would often travel to Las Vegas, Nevada, U.S. where she would perform. He was babysat by several cabaret members. He moved back to Manchester with his mother and step-father Mervyn Kay after briefly living in Blackburn as a youngster. When he was 13, he and his family moved to West Ealing, London. He moved out at the age of 16. After a brief spell of being homeless, Kay turned to small crimes to survive; he returned home after a false arrest and near-death experience, working as a break-dancer and soon pursuing a career in music. It was reported that he failed an audition to become a singer for the Brand New Heavies before forming his own band, although the Brand New Heavies denied this.

== Career ==
=== Jamiroquai ===
Kay formed Jamiroquai in 1992. Band members included Toby Smith (keyboards), Nick Van Gelder (drums, 1992–1993), Derrick McKenzie (drums 1994–present), Stuart Zender (bass) and Wallis Buchanan (didgeridoo). After the success of Jamiroquai's first single, "When You Gonna Learn", Kay signed a US$1 million record deal with Sony Soho^{2}. The band's first album was Emergency on Planet Earth (1993). The relationship with Sony ended in 2007. Kay is occasionally referred to as 'Jamiroquai' due to the misconception that the band is a solo artist.Jamiroquai were the third-best-selling UK act of the 1990s, after the Spice Girls and Oasis. As of April 2017, they have sold more than 26 million albums worldwide.

Kay is well known for his array of elaborate hats and headgear. Professional appearances for concerts, interviews and the like have prompted descriptions of Kay as "the mad hatter" for his love of headgear. In 2005, it was announced that Kay, often referred to as "the cat in the hat", was launching a range of distinctive clothing, including his trademark hats, on his new "Quai" label. The Indian Country Media Network criticised him for wearing headdresses originating from Native American populations, including the feathered war bonnet (as seen in the music video and CD single artwork for "Corner of the Earth" as well as on the album artwork for 2010's Rock Dust Light Star).

On 9 October 2017, Kay received the BMI President's Award at the BMI London Awards. That same year, he seriously injured his spine. Requiring surgery, it led to Jamiroquai cancelling two shows in Tokyo for their Automaton Tour, which were rescheduled later that year.

=== TV appearances ===
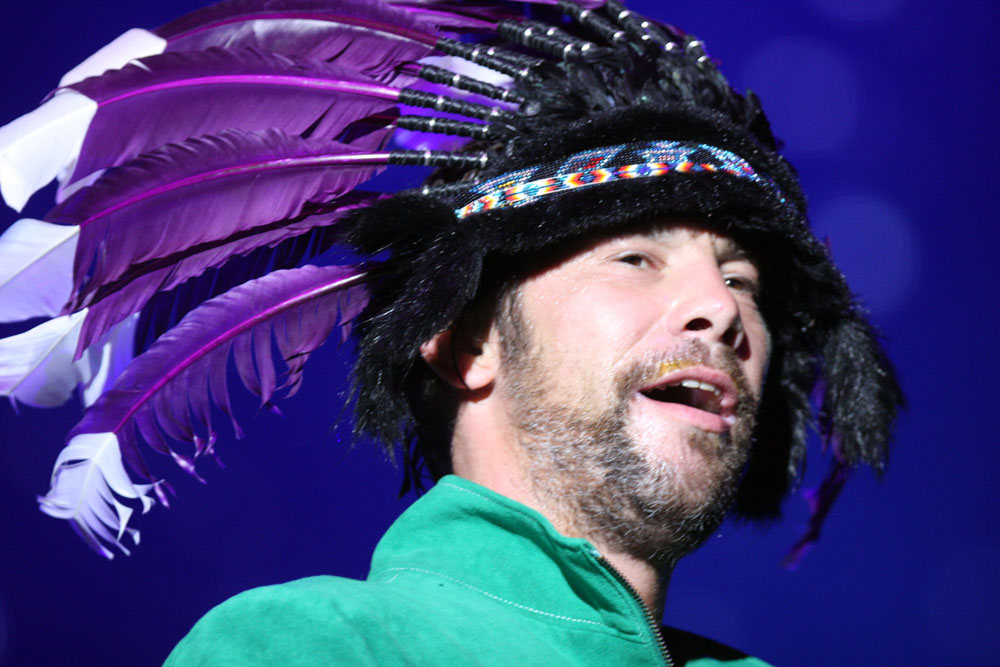
Kay in 2011

Kay appeared in an episode of the BBC series The Naked Chef with chef Jamie Oliver, and he performed on the series Strictly Come Dancing singing "Canned Heat". He has made many other TV guest appearances as either a singer, interviewee, or both, including on The Word, The Girlie Show, The Tonight Show with Jay Leno, Friday Night with Jonathan Ross, Rove, and many others.

Kay has appeared on four episodes of the BBC car show Top Gear. In series 1, episode 2, he set a lap time of 1:48.1 for the show's "Star in a Reasonably Priced Car" using the Suzuki Liana, holding the fastest lap time for all of the first series and most of the second series. In series 3, episode 4, Kay drove his Lamborghini Miura with Richard Hammond as a passenger. His third appearance was in series 11, episode 6, where his lap time of 1:45.81 using the Chevrolet Lacetti beat the top time held by Simon Cowell by one-tenth of a second; this car's record remained unbeaten throughout the entire series' run despite there being 58 drivers in total for the Chevrolet Lacetti, with AC/DC's Brian Johnson coming in second place for this car with 1:45.85. Kay won Top Gear's "John Sergeant Award" for the best dance after learning that his time on the Top Gear test track was the fastest lap time in 2008. On 24 May 2004, Kay appeared on Season 5, Episode 9 of Channel 5 series Fifth Gear. He gave the presenters a tour around his property whilst showing off his collection of cars.

In 1996, Kay appeared in a series of commercials airing in Japan for Sony's MiniDisc music format.

== Legal issues ==
In April 2001, Kay was charged with assaulting a paparazzo and damaging his camera outside the Attica nightclub in London's West End. Kay pleaded not guilty, and the charges were dropped due to lack of evidence.

In May 2002, Kay was questioned by police after an altercation at a premiere party for Star Wars: Episode II – Attack of the Clones, outside the St Martin's Lane Hotel, where it was alleged a paparazzo kicked his £70,000 Bentley after Kay had attempted to grab him as his car drove off. Kay harangued the paparazzo and his girlfriend; in response, the man gave him a severe headbutt to the nose. The pair were separated with blood streaming from Kay's shattered nose. The fight almost resumed inside the hotel, and Kay was photographed in a distressed state. He sported a black eye at his next gig. He was also reported to have got into a scuffle at an afterparty for the 2002 BRIT Awards.

In September 2006, he was again arrested outside a nightclub in West End, London for allegedly assaulting a paparazzo and damaging his camera. He was alleged to have acted erratically and was taken to Saville Police Station.

In March 2009, Kay's black Ferrari Enzo suffered nearly £10,000 worth of damage during an altercation with hotel chef Aaron Billington at the Brudenell Hotel in Aldeburgh. Billington, who was drunk and motivated by romantic interest in a woman with whom Kay was interacting, lost his job and was jailed for 20 weeks.

== Cars ==
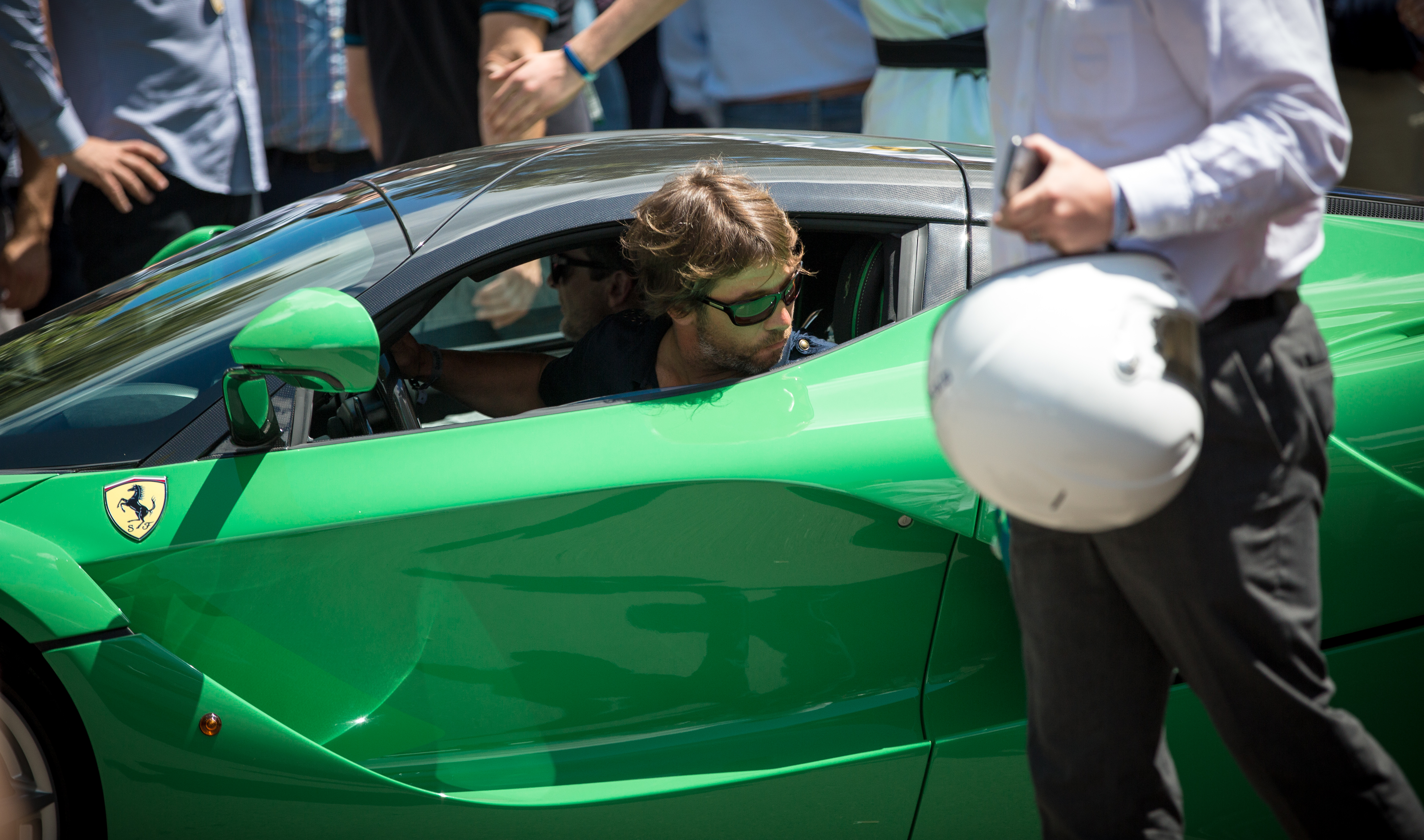
Kay in his Ferrari LaFerrari at Goodwood Festival of Speed in 2014

By 2013, Kay owned hundreds of cars—mainly sports cars. The cover of the 1996 album Travelling Without Moving features an adaptation of the "Buffalo Man" logo and the Ferrari crest. Some press coverage has negatively contrasted his strong interest in luxury cars with themes of environmental concern in Jamiroquai's lyrics. He responded in one interview, "[People] keep talking to me about cars and environment, and I reckon I do about 3,000 miles a year [...] I don't really drive that much at all any more, because I'm either on tour or doing stuff." He has also quipped that he "can only drive one at a time". Three of Kay's cars appeared in the video for the 1996 song "Cosmic Girl". One of the cars was a total loss, and the replacement was involved in an incident that destroyed the windscreen. Kay was not involved in either incident. In 2011, he visited Maranello for an exclusive viewing of the new Ferrari 458 Spider. Amongst his car collection, including what he calls "staff cars", he owned a one-off 1965 Ferrari 330 GT Vignale Shooting Brake. He decided to auction this car in 2018, selling it for $313,000.

The song "Black Devil Car" from the album Dynamite is a tribute to his black Ferrari Enzo. A die-cast 1:18 scale-model series of Kay's black Enzo from Hot Wheels was available for purchase, including a limited batch of cars with hand-signed windscreens.

Kay competed in the Celebrity Challenge race at the 2012 Silverstone Classic, finishing third behind AC/DC vocalist Brian Johnson and actor Kelvin Fletcher.

At the 2014 Goodwood Festival of Speed, Kay showcased his signal green LaFerrari, the only one of its colour in the world. He sold the car in 2019.

== Personal life ==
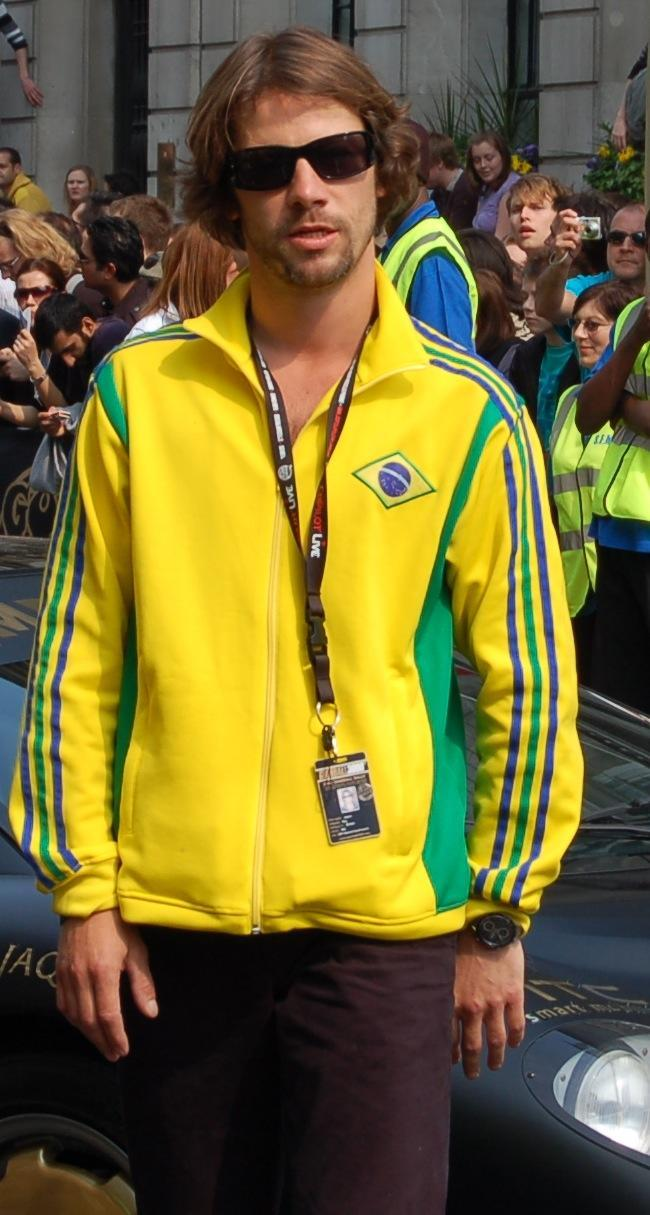
Kay in 2007

In 1997, Kay was in a brief relationship with actress Winona Ryder.From 1998 until 2001 Kay was in a relationship with Denise van Outen.

Kay is married and has two daughters. The track "Carla" from the Automaton album is a tribute to his first daughter. There is also a track called "Talullah" from Jamiroquai's 2005 album Dynamite, although the spelling on the album is different to his daughter's name.

Kay stated in 2010 that he had a "substantial" cocaine habit before quitting his drug use in 2003, said to have been triggered over his break-up with van Outen.

Kay formerly lived in the Ealing area of London, where he played some of his first gigs. Since 1995 he has owned Horsenden Manor at Horsenden, near Princes Risborough in Buckinghamshire where he has a recording studio, granary and garages. In 2020 he applied to extend the property. In another interview, he talked about how he has made his home environmentally sustainable, including tending to his own garden without pesticides, caring for livestock, creating an eco-friendly waste-removal system at great cost, and maximising his recycling. Kay and the band also put aside a significant portion of their royalties to environmental causes. He also owned a property in Gairloch, Wester Ross, Scotland until selling it in 2022.

When asked in a 1996 interview about having conventional religious beliefs, Kay responded, "I follow the religion of the trees and the greenery. I follow the religion of the moon. I believe in what people leave behind in the sense of trails and spirits, the energy which they project. I believe in vibrations, which is what the whole world runs on".

== See also ==
- List of number-one dance hits (United States)
- List of artists who reached number one on the US Dance chart
