= Clemence =

Clemence, or Clémence, is a name. It may refer to:

- Louise Michel (1830–1905), a French anarchist who used Clémence as a pseudonym

== Given name ==
- Clemence Margaret Acland (1889-1973), English nature photographer, ornithologist and researcher
- Clémence d'Aquitaine (1060–1142)
- Clemence of Austria (1262–1293 or 1295)
- Clemence of Hungary, Queen of France and Navarre
- Clemence B. Horrall (1895–1960), Los Angeles Police Chief
- Clémence Beikes, French basketball player
- Clémence Boudin (born 2008), French ice hockey player
- Clémence Boulouque, French scholar of political science and professor of Jewish studies at Columbia University
- Clémence Calvin, French runner
- Clemence Dane, English novelist and playwright
- Clémence DesRochers, Canadian performer
- Clémence de Grandval (1828–1907), French composer
- Clémence Grimal, French snowboarder
- Clémence Guetté (born 1991), French politician
- Clemence Housman, English women's rights activist
- Clémence Isaure, mythic patron of Toulousain poetry
- Clémence Matutu, Congolese handball player
- Clémence de Montagnac, French singer and salonnière
- Clémence Ollivier, French rugby union player
- Clémence Poésy, French actress and model
- Clémence Ross-van Dorp, Dutch politician
- Clémence Saint-Preux, French singer
- Clemence Sophia Harned Lozier, American physician

== Family name ==
- Chris Clemence (born 1986), bassist of the band RapScallions
- George H. Clemence, American architect
- Gerald Maurice Clemence (1908–1974), American astronomer
- Ray Clemence (1948–2020), English football goalkeeper
- Sacha Clémence, English footballer
- Stephen Clemence, English footballer

== See also ==
- Clemencia (name), list of the people
