= Warwick (guitar manufacturer) =

German bass guitar manufacturer

Warwick GmbH & Co Music Equipment KG
- Company type: Private
- Industry: Musical instruments
- Founded: Erlangen, Bavaria, Germany (1982; 44 years ago)
- Founder: Hans-Peter Wilfer
- Headquarters: Markneukirchen, Germany
- Area served: Global
- Products: acoustic & electric basses; electric upright bass; bass amplifiers
- Owner: Hans-Peter Wilfer
- Divisions: Framus
- Website: warwick.de

Warwick is a German bass guitar manufacturing company. Warwick basses were originally a premium brand offering a small range of models built from high quality and exotic tonewoods. The company also produces valve and FET amplifiers, speaker cabinets, bass guitar strings, and is the owner of the Framus trademark. Their headquarters and custom shops are located in Markneukirchen, Shanghai, and Nashville.

== History ==
Warwick was founded in 1982 in Erlangen, in the German state of Bavaria, by Hans-Peter Wilfer. In 1995 the company moved to Markneukirchen in the Saxon Vogtland to capitalize on the centuries-old tradition of instrument building in the region and to reopen the Framus trademark. In addition, the company has developed an extensive distribution network throughout Germany and Austria to represent and distribute products from musical instruments and equipment companies from Europe and the United States.

== Company specifics ==
=== Environmental protection ===
Warwick produces its instruments and amplifiers using carbon-neutral principles. Any other manufacturing process is carbon-neutral as well. The company is purchasing its wood from sustainable sources (certified by the Forest Stewardship Council) and produces all the electricity it needs through its own natural-gas-powered plant, solar roof-mounted facilities, a boiler fueled by wood waste from its guitars and wind power.

Warwick is operating according to the guidelines of European Unions Eco-Management and Audit Scheme, which is a voluntary environmental management instrument designed to continuously improve companies' environmental performance.

=== Training courses ===
In the past, the company hosted the "Warwick Bass Camp", where participants from all over the world were given the opportunity to join training courses and learn from notable bass players such as Victor Wooten, John Patitucci, Lee Sklar, Stuart Hamm, Alphonso Johnson, Dave Ellefson, Hellmut Hattler, Ryan Martinie or Gary Willis.

== Basses ==
=== Custom Shop / Masterbuilt models ===
Warwick produces a variety of different models with different woods and electronics. The original series, which are manufactured in Germany, include the Corvette, Streamer, Thumb SC, and Dolphin. The only model in the original catalog made outside of Germany is the Alien acoustic bass, built in Korea.

==== Limited Editions ====
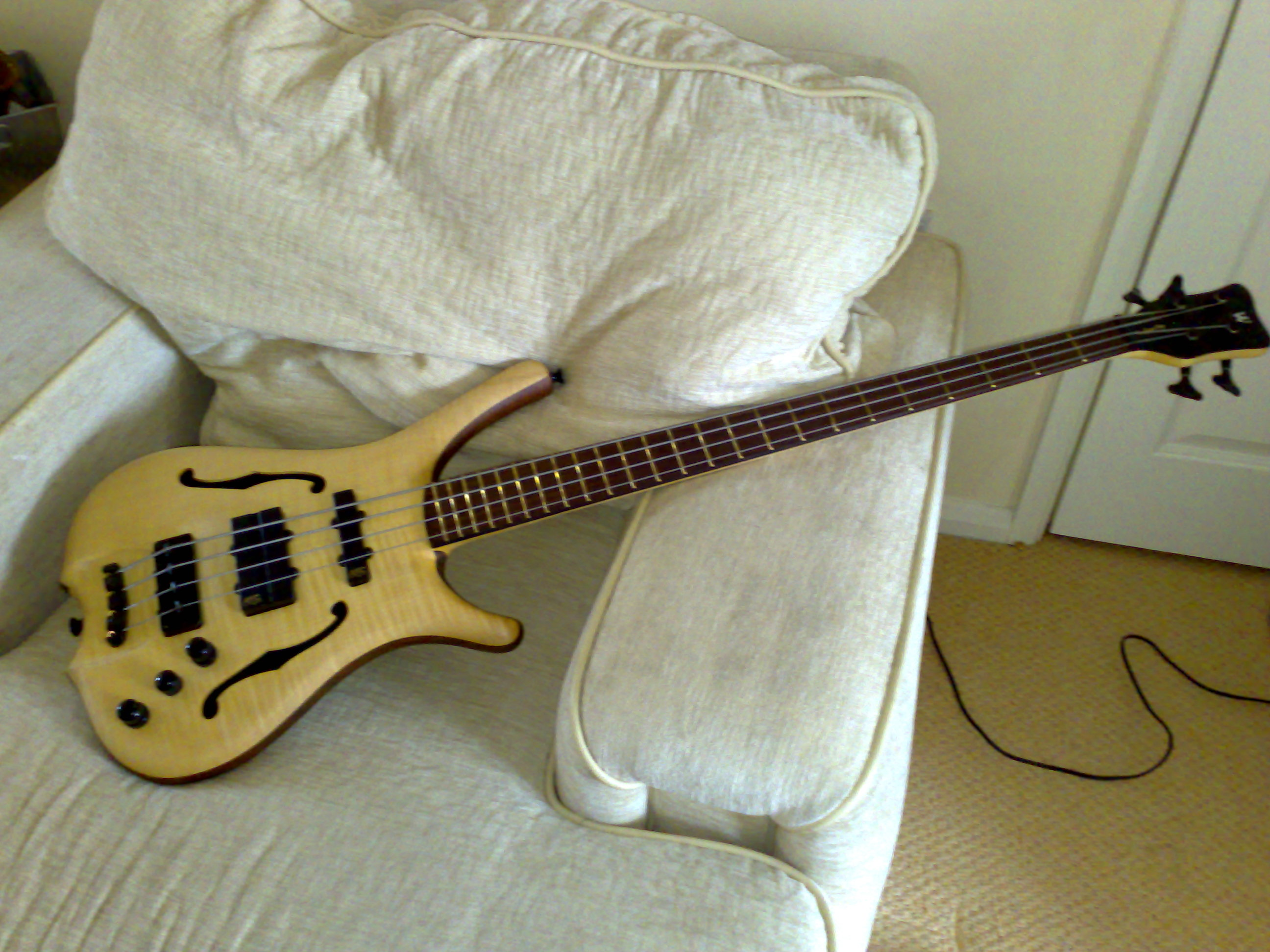
Warwick Infinity model

In 2001, Warwick began making Limited Edition instruments; every year, distinctive features are added to one production model, and built in limited quantities, starting with the Thumb BO Bass. Upgrades include exotic woods, different pickups and electronic configurations, and custom finishes.

As well, there are around forty Special Edition bass models in production. These basses are usually upgraded versions of standard models that have features otherwise unavailable.

Examples include the Thumb BO (ovangkol neck and body back and bubinga pommele top, with 2mm of swamp ash laminated between, and ebony fretboard; 150 built for 2001) and the FNA Jazzman in walnut and swirly bubinga (200 built for 2002).

==== Signature Series ====
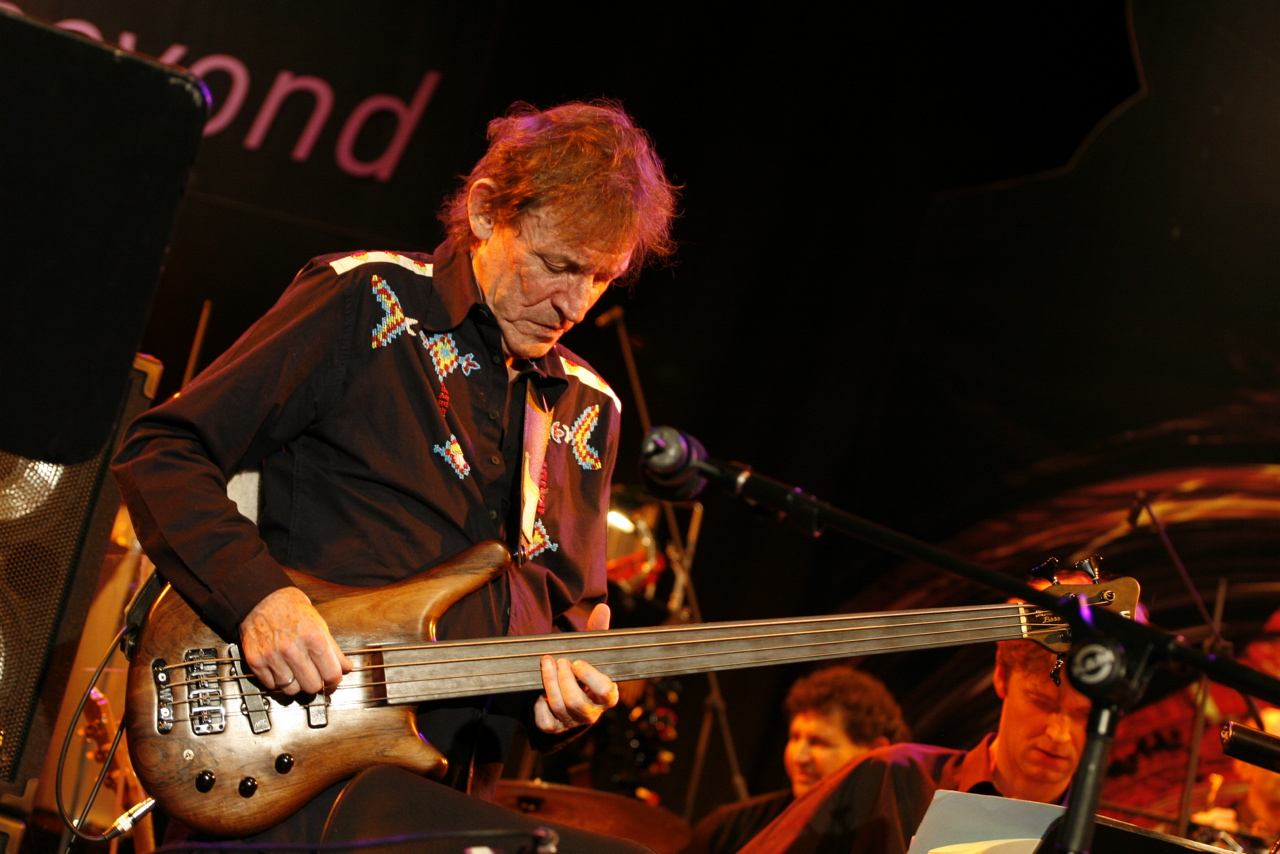
Jack Bruce playing a Warwick Thumb bass model, Frankfurt, Germany, October 2006

In 2019, Warwick produced 13 models of signature bass. Present and past models have included those for Jack Bruce (Cream), Bootsy Collins, T.M. Stevens, Robert Trujillo (Metallica), Jonas Hellborg, Adam Clayton (U2), John Entwistle (The Who) and Jäcki Reznicek (Silly).

P-Nut of 311 has three signature basses, all Streamer models.

The Stuart Zender (Jamiroquai) signature bass is designed by Zender, and features a body shape new to Warwick basses.

Warwick also built custom fretless seven-string Thumb NT basses for Jeroen Paul Thesseling.

=== Pro Series (Teambuilt) ===
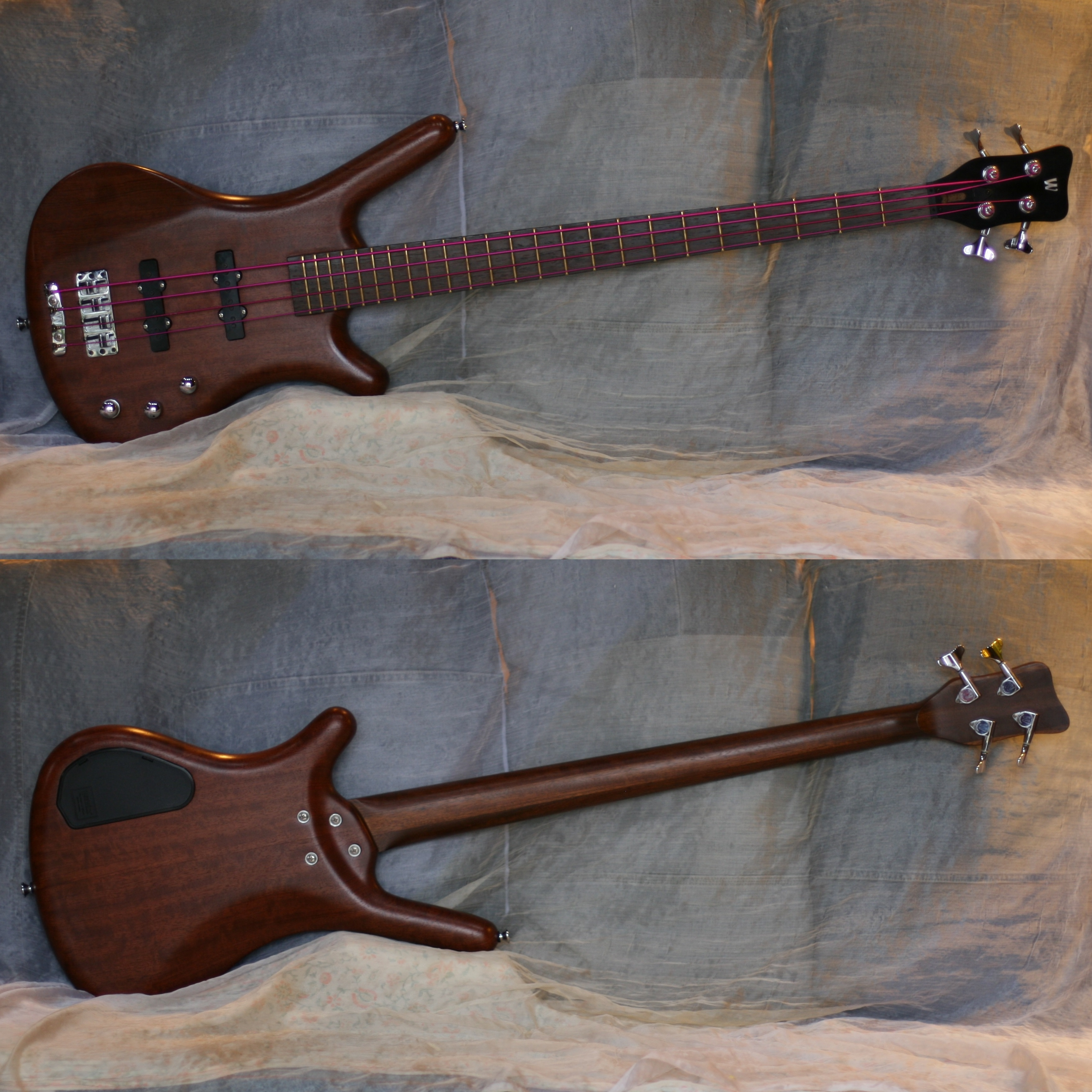
Warwick Teambuilt Pro Series Corvette Bubinga 4-String

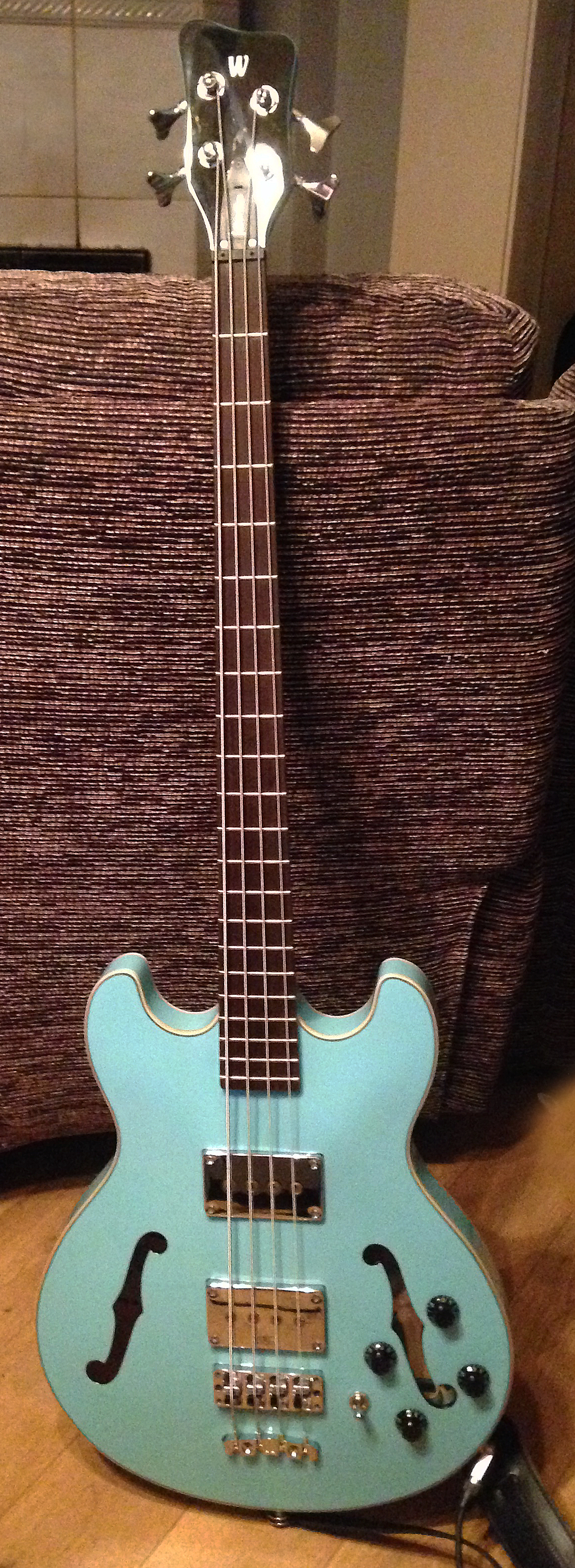
Warwick Star Bass model

The Pro Series instruments are crafted in the same German factory as the Custom Shop models. Fewer unusual woods are employed, and options for finish and hardware are more limited, keeping pricing lower. Models include the Corvette, Streamer, Thumb, and Star bass.

=== RockBass ("Standard") ===
Consumer-level RockBass models are made in China, using less exotic woods and simpler finishes. These basses are the Streamer, Corvette, Fortress, Vampyre, Star Bass, Triumph, and Alien acoustic; the Rockbass Alien is the only Rockbass model that looks different from the original.

==== RockBass Artist Line ====
The RockBass Artist Line produces affordable signature models, also made in China. These include the Robert Trujillo four- and five-string; the Bootsy Collins SpaceBass; the Steve Bailey four-, five-, and six-string; the P-Nut four- and five-string; and the Jack Bruce and Adam Clayton models.

== Strings ==
Warwick produces strings for electric, Acoustic and their own Triumph model.
Electric Bass

- Red Label Strings
  - Stainless F
  - Nickelplated
- Yellow Label Strings
  - Roundwound Nickel stringsF
- Black Label Strings
  - Black Label Long Scale
  - Black Label Medium Scale
- EMP Strings (coated)

Acoustic Bass
For Acoustic basses they only produce 2 kind of strings.

- Red Label
- Black Label

Triumph Bass For their own Reissue of the Triumph bass they have their own strings to match it.

== Amps & cabinets ==
Warwick produces a variety of bass-combos, ampheads and cabinets, including a signature Jonas Hellborg ampsystem.

In 2014, the Amps and Cabinets were this:

Combos:

- BC 10 Combo 8
- BC 20 Combo 8
- BC 40 Combo 10
- BC 80 Combo 12
- BC 150 Combo 15
- BC 300 Combo 15

Ampheads:

- WA 300 (with and without sleeve)
- WA 600 (with and without sleeve)
- LWA 1000 (with silver and black surface)
- Hellborg Mono Power 500W
- Hellborg Stereo Power 2x250W
- Hellborg Preamp

Cabinets:

- 2x10" Cabinet
- 8x10" Cabinet
- WCA 115 (with wheels or without/in 4Ω or 8Ω)
- WCA 410 (with wheels or without/in 4Ω or 8Ω)
- WCA 610 (with wheels in 4Ω or 6Ω)
- JH Club Cab 1×15"
- JH Lo Cab 1×15"
- JH HC 2×12"
- JH BC 2×15"

Discontinued amps:

- Warwick ProFet 3.x
- Warwick ProFet 5.x
- Warwick Quad IV
- Warwick Quad VI
- Warwick Tupepath 5.x
- Warwick Tupepath 10.x
- Warwick X-Treme 5.x
- Warwick X-Treme 10.x
- Warwick Blue Cab series
- Warwick Sweet series
- Warwick CCL series

== Warwick players ==
Signature Artists:

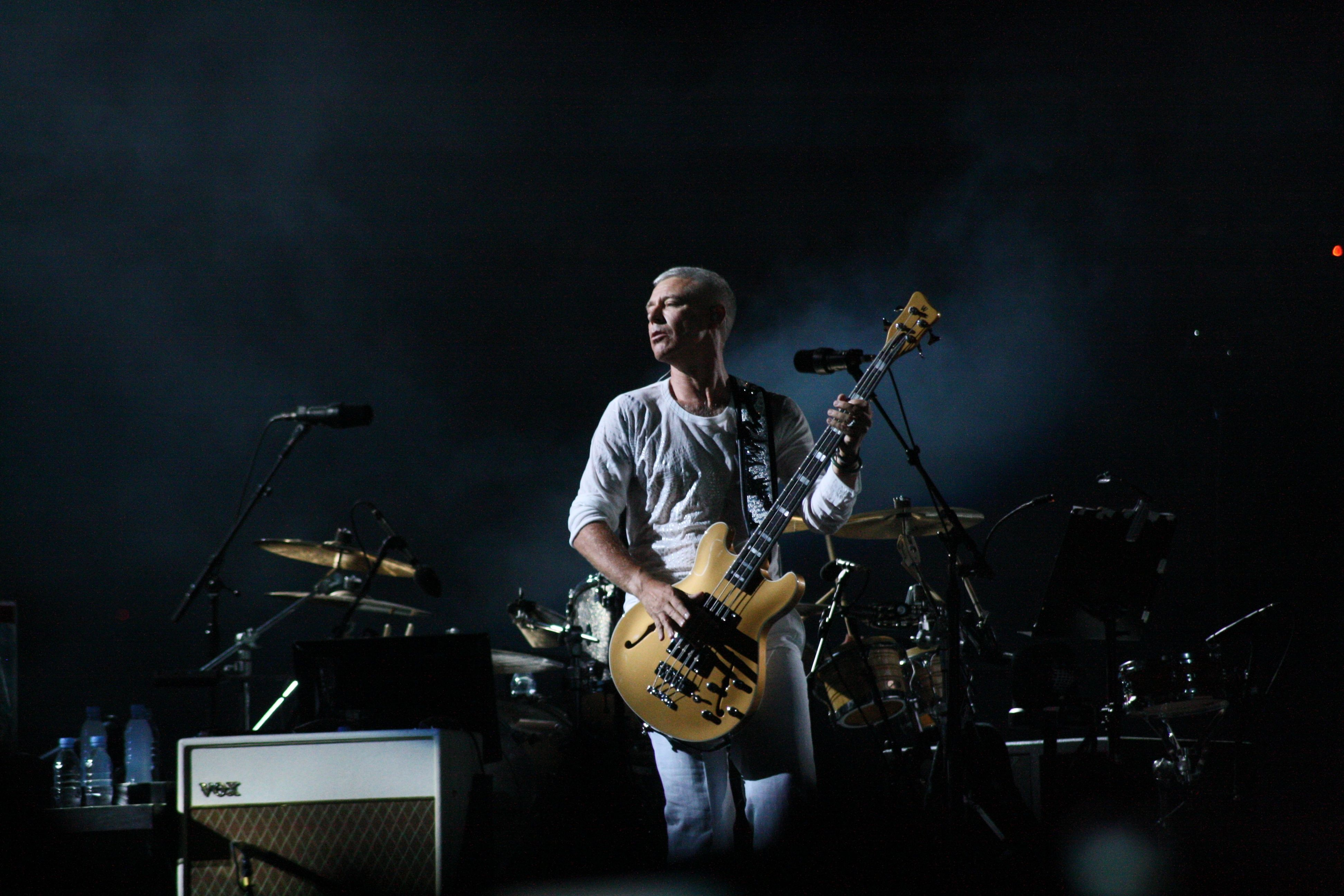
Adam Clayton with Warwick Star Bass, 2010

- Adam Clayton
- Bootsy Collins
- Jack Bruce
- Jimmy Earl
- Jonas Hellborg
- P-Nut
- Dirk Lance
- Leland Sklar
- Robert Trujillo
- Steve Bailey
- Stuart Zender
- T.M. Stevens
- Stuart Hamm

Artists:

- John Entwistle (The Who)
- Tony Garnier (Bob Dylan)
- Sonny T. (Prince, Cory Wong)
- John Norwood Fisher (Fishbone)
- Volkan Gundogdu (Balans)
- Ryan Martinie (Mudvayne, Soften the Glare)
- Mike Inez (Alice in Chains)
- Martin Eric Ain (Celtic Frost)
- Wan Gegau (Kyoji-Sky Band)
- Alphonso Johnson (Weather Report, Santana)
- Scott Reeder (Kyuss, The Obsessed)
- Guy Pratt (Pink Floyd, David Gilmour, Roxy Music, Michael Jackson, Kirsty MacColl, The Smiths)
- James LoMenzo (Megadeth, Black Label Society)
- Paul Gray (Slipknot)
- Rex Brown (Pantera, Down, Kill Devil Hill)
- Tom Jenkinson aka Squarepusher
- Jeroen Paul Thesseling (Obscura, Pestilence)
- Troy Sanders (Mastodon)
- Dick Lövgren (Meshuggah)
- Traa Daniels (P.O.D.)
- Sam Rivers (Limp Bizkit)
- Marko Hietala (Nightwish)
- Evan Brewer (The Faceless, Entheos)
- PJ Phillips (Russ Ballard, Heavy Metal Kids)
- Nick Shaw (Black Crown Initiate)
- Chris Clemence (RapScallions, Screaming At Demons)
- Kyle Sokol (Sectioned, Rude Squad, Noble Jones)
- Erlend Caspersen (Spawn of Possession)
- Ryota Kohama (One Ok Rock)
- Francis Buchholz (Scorpions, Michael Schenker Group)

- Prince
- Tor Risdal "Seidemann" Stavenes (1349)
- Ricky Kinchen (Mint Condition)
