= Warwick Dolphin =

- Manufacturer: Warwick
- Period: 1982–present

Construction
- Body type: Solid
- Neck joint: Set-in or Neck-Thru

Woods
- Body: Afzelia with TCS (Tone Chamber System) or Ovangkol
- Neck: Ovangkol
- Fretboard: Wenge

Hardware
- Bridge: Warwick 2 Piece 3D Bridge System
- Pickup(s): J/TJ (Neck - Jazz; Bridge - Twin Jazz

Colors available
- Various

Dolphin is a bass guitar manufactured by the Warwick company from Markneukirchen, Germany. The "D-bass" earned its fame for its somewhat eccentric design.

== Dolphin Pro I ==
The Dolphin Pro I is a neck-through bass with a 'hidden neck' design, specialized by Warwick. The body and the neck are made of ovangkol wood. For everything from percussive playing to fingerstyle, the Dolphin's sound still loses nothing in fullness and warmth. The "D-bass" has 26 frets, has active J/TJ pickups (MEC), a 2-band preamp, and weighs from 4.5 to 4.8 kilograms. The rhombus-inspired body design makes for a well balanced bass when playing, and has since its introduction remained a premium model in the Warwick catalogue.

== Dolphin SN ==
The Dolphin SN (TCS) is a bass patented by the company, but now discontinued. SN presented 'Set Neck', which gave it a new look and a lower price. To achieve its tonal characteristic, Afzelia was used for the body wood, the same wood used for the Streamer Stage II bass. TCS (Tone Chamber System) was inserted into the body that made the bass lighter (and thus more comfortable to play) and should have brought out Afzelia's full potential to reality. However, with all its advantages, it wasn't selling as much as its sister bass, so this model was discontinued.

== Dolphin Pro 2 ==
Another discontinued Dolphin model was a more affordable model called the Pro 2 with bolt-on necks made of maple. It had two J-pickups in a more standard position and did not feature the Dolphin inlays on the fingerboard. It was introduced around 1990 and discontinued in 1999. After an attempt at making these basses in Germany in which 2-300 basses were deemed not worthy of the Warwick logo, the production was moved to Japan (Morris "Morridaira" - MMI) which had experience crafting quality instruments at a more affordable price than was possible for Warwick in Germany. The Japanese instruments were highly regarded as a quality, affordable version of the Dolphin with the real W for Warwick on the headstock.

== History ==
The earliest Dolphin Pro 1 models from 1989 and 1990 were equipped with a Bartolini single coil pickup at the neck- and Bartolini humbucker at the bridge position. Since 1991 Warwick switched to the then available MEC Twinjazz at bridge position and a MEC single coil at neck position, drastically changing the tone of the Pro 1 model to a more modern and growly one.

In 1991 there was also a limited run of broad neck five string Dolphin Pro 1 models which had Bartolini soapbar switchable coil pickups at both neck and bridge positions, of which only the bridge pickup coil mode can be switched.

The woods of the Dolphin also has changed over the years. Earlier the Dolphins had hand shaped boiré (since 2006 on the IUCN Red List of Threatened Species) bodies with wenge necks with laminated zebrano stripes and a wenge fingerboard. Also some were made with maple in the bodies. The bass could be ordered in 4 and 5-string models, a 6 string model wasn't introduced until 2012.

== Notable players ==
- Dick Lövgren, the bass player of extreme metal band Meshuggah since 2004 owns five Dolphin five-string basses (four SN and one Pro I model). Although he owns a wide selection of fretted and fretless Warwick basses, his black custom Dolphin SN five-string is his favoured bass and is his main bass for studio recordings and live performances.
- Kayleigh Marchant, bass player of the celtic folk rock band The Dolmen. Her favorite bass on stage is a Warwick Dolphin Pro I.
- Stefan Lessard, bassist for the Dave Matthews Band played a Warwick Dolphin Pro 1 in the early 90s as his main bass with the band.

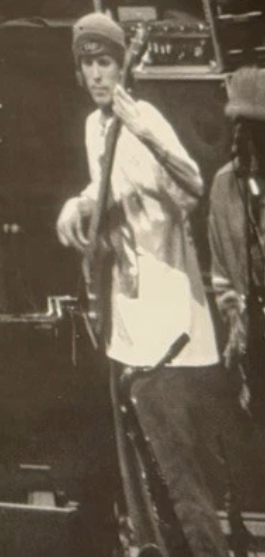
Stefan Lessard playing a Warwick Dolphin Pro I at an early Dave Matthews Band show.
