= Can You Feel It =

Can You Feel It may refer to:

== Albums ==
- Can You Feel It, a 1989 album by Angel
- Can You Feel It? (EP) by Highlight, 2017
- Can You Feel It, a 1972 album by S.O.U.L.
- Can You Feel It, a 1973 album by Lighthouse

== Songs ==
- "Can You Feel It" (The Jacksons song), 1981
- "Can You Feel It" (Larry Heard song), 1986
- "Can You Feel It" (Ross Lynch song), 2012
- "Can You Feel It" (Timomatic song), 2012
- "Can You Feel It" (DNCE song), 2017
- "Can You Feel It", a 1977 song by Angel from their album On Earth as It Is in Heaven
- "Can You Feel It", a 2004 song by Jean-Roch
- "Can You Feel It", a 2014 song by RapScallions
- "Can You Feel It", a 2016 song by Pentagon from the EP Five Senses
- "Can U Feel It", a 1997 song by 3rd Party
- "Can U Feel It", a 2017 song from My Little Pony: The Movie
- "Can You Feel It?", a 2024 song by BoyWithUke
