= Stuart Zender =

British bass guitarist

- Also known as: Stu, SZ
- Born: Stuart Patrick Jude Zender; 18 March 1974 (age 52); London, England
- Origin: Sheffield, England
- Genres: Acid jazz; funk; pop; hard rock; alternative dance
- Occupation: Musician
- Instrument: Bass
- Years active: 1993–present
- Formerly of: Jamiroquai (1993–1998)

Stuart Patrick Jude Zender (born 18 March 1974) is an English bassist. He is best known as a former member of the band Jamiroquai.

== Biography ==
=== Early life ===
Zender was born in Sheffield, England. He comes from a family with a musical background: Zender's father was a musician, his uncle was a flamenco guitarist, and his older sister participated in punk bands. His family relocated to Norristown, Pennsylvania, when Zender was seven years old. He moved back to England at age 15, where he attended Leighton Park School in Reading, UK, for a year in 1988–89 before being expelled. Zender played the snare drums for his school's marching band before he started to play bass at age 16. He practiced the instrument playing by ear to Black Market by Weather Report, and he was able to play all of the bass parts in two weeks. Before leaving his home at age 17, Zender's mother had saved for him £2,000 (equivalent to £4,600 in 2025) for the occasion. Zender initially played in pubs with a punk rock band, but he had creative differences with the band. He recalled being "stuck onstage, playing these little four-chord songs. I would always jazz the whole thing up and start doing solos and things like that, and they would just tell me to shut up."

Zender admitted that he never had good business acumen, so instead of investing his mother's parting cash gift in a traditional way, he visited a music store and bought a Warwick Streamer bass guitar, which cost nearly the whole amount given to him by his mother. Before picking up a Warwick, Zender played a Music Man Stingray bass guitar. Of his early bands, the most famous was the prank rock group Fabulous, a 1991 outfit chiefly made up of NME writers and photographers.

=== Jamiroquai (1993–1998) ===
Zender met Jamiroquai's original drummer Nick van Gelder through his sister. He auditioned for the band in 1993 as the band's bassist, and he played on studio albums from Emergency on Planet Earth (1993) to Travelling Without Moving (1996). From there, Zender was asked to become an official Warwick basses endorser. He received a number of unique customised Streamer models.

Zender left Jamiroquai in 1998 during the recording of their fourth album, Synkronized, primarily because of conflicts with the band leader Jay Kay. A spokesperson for the band said that Zender also expressed his desire to spend more time with his then-girlfriend Melanie Blatt and their new baby.

=== 1998–present ===
After Jamiroquai, Zender had his own project with the British soul artist Don-E called AZUR, which signed a record deal with D'Angelo's label. However, the project was shelved and was then available on the Internet for a short time. He has also played bass guitar with other artists, including All Saints, Omar, Lauryn Hill, D'Angelo, Gorillaz, Samuel Purdey, Ms. Dynamite and Stevie Wonder.

In summer 2006, Zender became the musical director and bass guitar player for Mark Ronson. The release of the album Version in 2007 proved to be a larger success than first expected. He has played bass guitar for Ronson at events such as BBC Radio 1's Big Weekend, Wireless Festival, Global Gathering, and Glastonbury, and festivals all over Europe, including Montreux Jazz Festival in Switzerland and North Sea Jazz Festival in Rotterdam. They were also special guests on Jay-Z's UK tour.

Having left the Mark Ronson band in 2011, Zender started his own record label, White Buffalo Recordings, and formerly ran the music publishing company Made Youth Inc.

Some of Zender's most recent work was with the band Leroi. Zender explained they were signed to Geffen Records in Los Angeles but that the deal fell through after the heads of the company, Polly Anthony and Jordan Shurr, who signed them, were made redundant.

In March 2023, Zender released the song "Happy Feelings", featuring Omar and Ana Tijoux, on all major streaming platforms.

In November 2024, Zender released the song "Run" (originally recorded in 2000) on all major streaming platforms under the alias LeRoi74.

== Artistry ==
Zender has cited players such as Nathaniel Phillips, Stanley Clarke, Alphonso Johnson, Chuck Rainey, Larry Graham, Bootsy Collins, Verdine White, James Jamerson, Bernard Edwards, Paul Jackson, Hellmut Hattler as his influences.

== Personal life ==
From 1998 to 2006, Zender and All Saints singer Melanie Blatt were in a relationship. They had one child together, born on 20 November 1998. Their relationship ended in 2006. In 2026, it was reported by BBC News that Zender had met his half-brother, singer Peter Cunnah of D:Ream, following Cunnah’s search for his biological father. The two subsequently spent time together discussing their respective musical careers. His half-sister is singer and songwriter Philippa Hanna.

== Equipment ==
- 1x Warwick SZ Signature Bass 4-string.
- 1x Warwick SZ Signature Bass 4-string (Red one, saw live in Paris and Amsterdam for Mark Ronson).
- 1x Warwick SZ Signature Bass 4-string (White one, Zender posted the picture on Facebook).
- 1x Warwick "Iroquai Rug Bass" Streamer 5-string.
- 1x Warwick "The Chrome Ender Bass" Streamer Stage I 4-string.
- 1x Fender 1964 Precision Bass.
- 1x Warwick Streamer Stage II 5-string (used in 1995 live).
- 1x Alembic Epic 4-string (onstage backup bass guitar).
- 1x Warwick Streamer Stage I 4-string.
- Ashdown Engineering ABM Amplification.
- Ashdown Engineering SZ Funk Face Twin Dynamic Filter Pedal – Stuart Zender Signature Auto-Wah Pedal

== Discography ==
Release	Accompanying artist	Role	Membership	Year
Emergency on Planet Earth (except "When You Gonna Learn (Digeridoo)")	Jamiroquai	Bass	Ex-Member	1993
"Serengeti"	Jessica Lauren	Bass	Guest	1993
In Concert-582	Jamiroquai	Bass	Ex-Member	1994
The Return of the Space Cowboy	Jamiroquai	Bass, Composer	Ex-Member	1994
"Lost Souls" – Jazzmatazz, Vol. 2: The New Reality / Feel The Music	Guru	Bass	Guest	1995
Travelling Without Moving	Jamiroquai	Bass guitar, Writer	Ex-Member	1996
19 ("Cold Shoulder")	Adele	Bass guitar	Guest	2008
Live from 6A – Late Night with Conan O'Brien	Various	Bass guitar	Guest	(unknown)
The Miseducation of Lauryn Hill	Lauryn Hill	Bass guitar	Guest	1998
Black Angel	Mica Paris	Bass guitar	Guest	1998
Signs of a Struggle	Mattafix	Bass guitar, Keyboards	Guest	2005
Best by Far	Omar	Bass guitar, Percussion, Electric guitar, Keyboards, Programming, Co-writer, Producer	Guest	2000
Saints and Sinners	All Saints	Writer, Producer, Mixer, Keyboards, Bass guitar, Percussion, Strings, Programming	Guest	2000
Laika Come Home	Spacemonkeyz vs. Gorillaz	Bass guitar	Guest	2002
Version	Mark Ronson	Bass guitar	Guest	2007
Record Collection ("Somebody To Love Me")	Mark Ronson & The Business Intl.	Bass guitar	Guest	2010
In Search of Better Days	Incognito	Bass guitar	Guest	2016
