= Warwick Thumb SC =

Bass guitar

- Manufacturer: Warwick
- Period: 1990–present

Construction
- Body type: Solid
- Neck joint: Set-in

Woods
- Body: Mahogany (often with a maple top),
- Neck: Mahogany, maple
- Fretboard: Rosewood, ebony, maple

Hardware
- Bridge: Usually hardtail (Tune-O-Matic)
- Pickup(s): Usually J

Colors available
- Burst, Natural, Satin

The Thumb SC is a bass guitar manufactured by the Warwick company. It is the first Warwick bass with the single cut design.

== History ==
Following the increasing popularity of the "Single Cut" bass design, Warwick decided to keep up with the other companies and build their own single cut bass. This idea was initially started within the Warwick Official Forum, with one user making a SC Thumb mockup that looked promising for the rest of the members. This gave the idea to Florin Barbu, the forum host, to contact Hans-Peter Wilfer, to see if there was a way for this initial idea to be realized. Peter Wilfer gave him the idea to organize a forum contest, in which users would create a "Warwick-like" SC bass using modern Warwick specifications. In a tournament-like fashion, the contest began in January 2008. On 7 July 2009, Florin announced that the users Zsolt Ferenczi and Laszlo Demeter were the winning team. The winning model became a real bass in the Warwick line-up. The Thumb SC was officially presented on NAMM 2010.

== Concept ==
The Thumb SC's shape is based on the original design of the Warwick Thumb NT. The woods it is constructed out of, however, make it different from the Thumb NT. The Thumb SC is constructed with a US Swamp Ash body and a Bubinga Pommelé top, a Tigerstripe Ebony fingerboard, and a Flame Maple neck.

== Hardware/pickups & Electronics ==
The Thumb SC uses the black standard Warwick hardware. Like the Thumb NT 6-string, the Thumb SC has two active MEC humbuckers nestled near the bridge, and a 3-band active EQ. However, the Thumb SC has two mini toggle switches for coil splitting, where the Thumb NT does not.
