= Warwick Corvette =

Bass guitar line

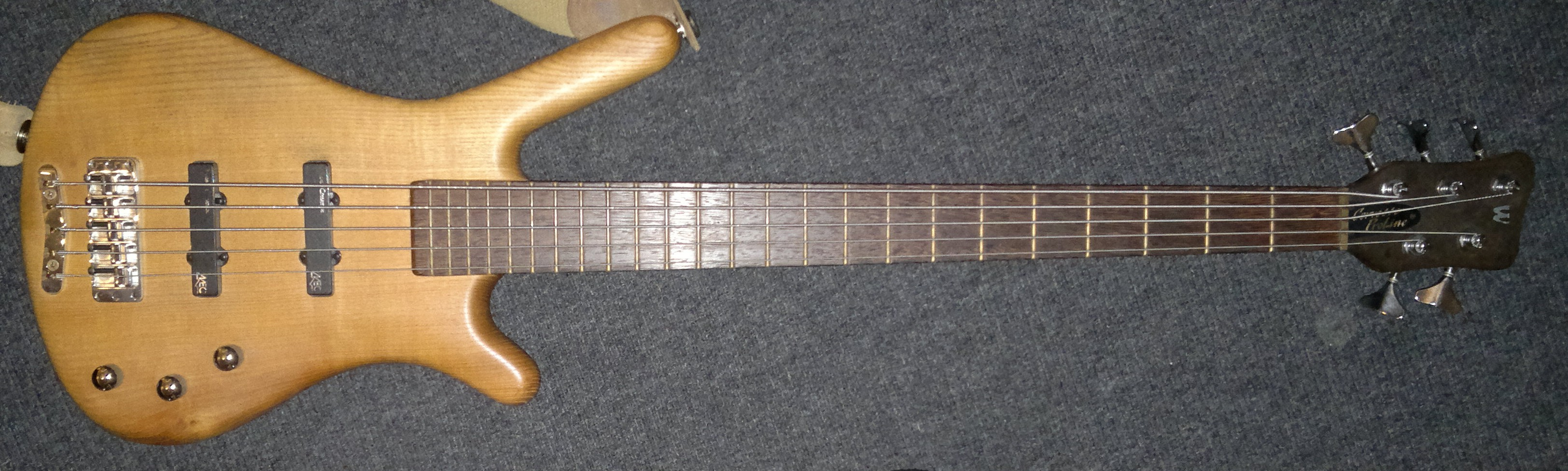
- 1992 Corvette Proline
- Manufacturer: Warwick
- Period: 1992–present

Construction
- Body type: Solid
- Neck joint: Bolt on

Woods
- Body: Ash
- Neck: Ovangkol
- Fretboard: Wenge

Hardware
- Bridge: Usually hardtail (Tune-O-Matic)
- Pickup(s): Usually J

Colors available
- Burst, Natural, Satin

Warwick Corvette is a line of bass guitars manufactured by the German Warwick bass company. The Corvette is one of the most popular Warwick basses. Among the more distinctive Corvette players are Erlend Caspersen and Hansford Rowe. Despite its similarity in woods and aesthetics to the Thumb bass, it has a drastically different feel, tone, and ergonomics. It is one of the most distinctive Warwick basses.

== Corvette Proline ==
Initially produced from 1992 onwards the first Corvette models were called Corvette Proline and made in Germany. Later these configurations became the Corvette Standard. The early versions had strap locks that were recessed into the body and two strap locks on the bridge side of the body. The picture below shows a 5-String Corvette Proline (Ser.: G 000122 92) from 1992 (according to Warwick) with Wenge neck and fingerboard combined with a 2-piece ash body and passive electronics with MEC pickups. It features bronze frets and an adjustable brass nut.

== Corvette Standard ==
First Corvette Standard were produced 1995. However, a recent rise in popularity for the Corvette Standard's variant, Corvette $$, has caused a very steep fall in popularity for the Corvette Standard models. The Corvette Standard is no longer made in Germany, but is now being made with the same specs in Korea since the company was losing money on each bass built. (The bass cost more to build than what they were selling it for.) Corvette Standard's distinctive sound is recognized as very raw and bright, especially being a favorite among rock/metal bass players.

== Corvette $$, Corvette $$ NT Bubinga and Corvette $$ NT Ash ==
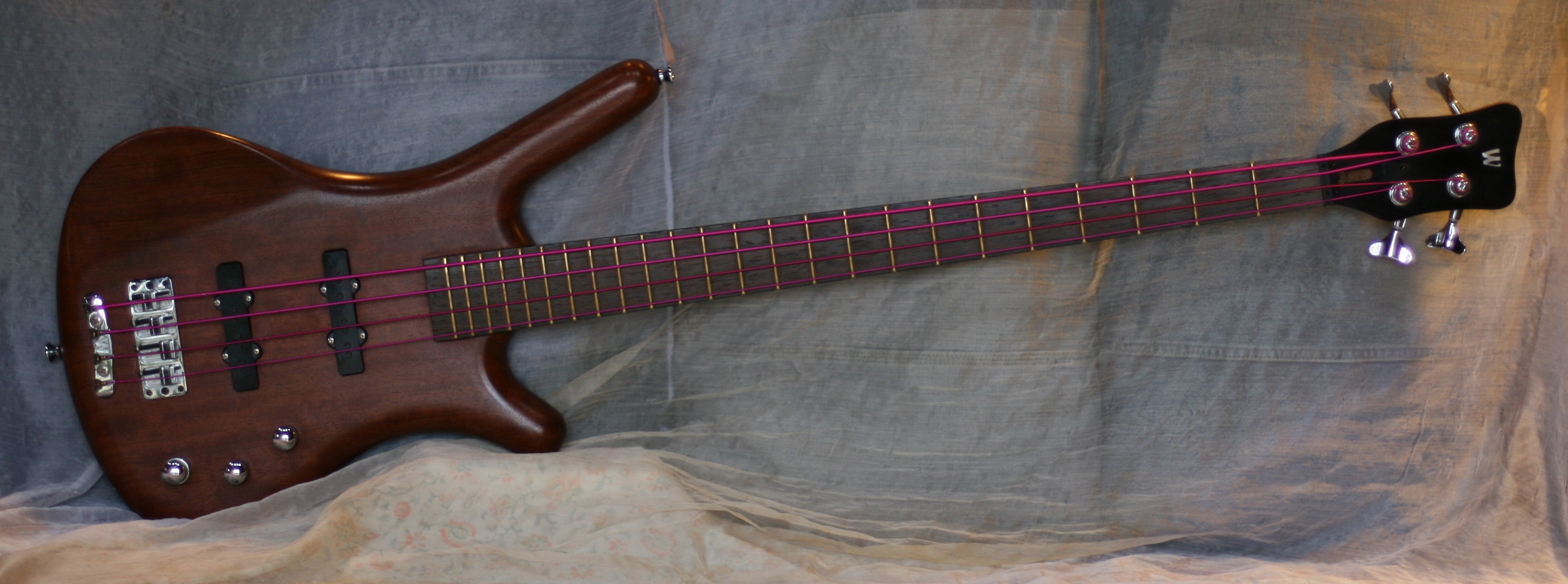
Warwick Teambuilt Pro Series Corvette Bubinga 4-String front

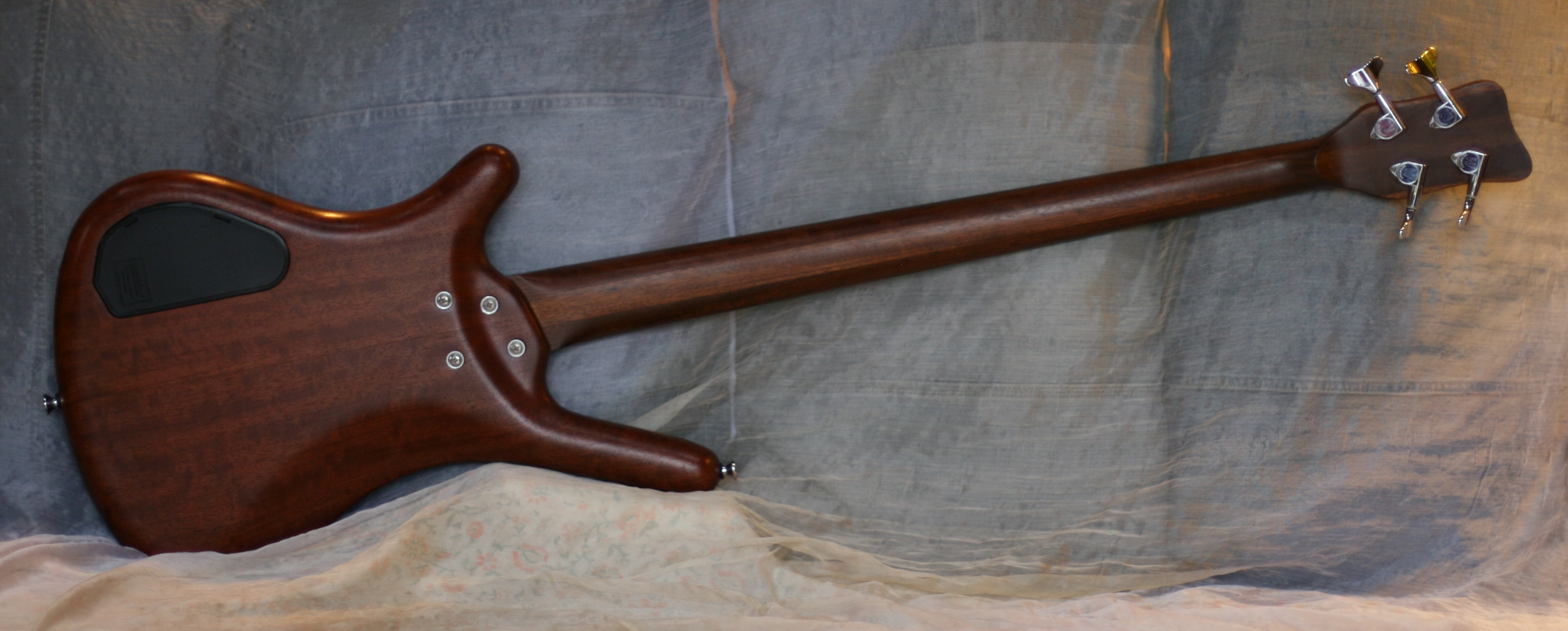
Warwick Teambuilt Pro Series Corvette Bubinga 4-String back

As an upgrade to Corvette Standard models, Warwick brought three new models: Corvette $$ (double Humbucker pickups) and Corvette $$ NT (Neck Through) (ash/bubinga). Even though they cosmetically resemble previous Corvette models, the Corvette $$ gets its identity from its unique pickup and electronics package that is different from its predecessor, the Corvette Standard.

Corvette $$ NT, Swamp Ash or Bubinga are available as a selection for the body wood. The durable Bubinga causes an aggressive sound with significant attack. In contrast, the Swamp Ash version delivers a growling rock sound, stable and with low-mid sustain. Both versions are equipped with the two separately configurable MM-style humbuckers by MEC with large open pole-pieces, thus being usable in a very flexible way.

== Special Edition & LTD Corvettes ==
There are number of custom shop, limited, and special edition Corvette models, made from many different exotic woods mostly uncommon to the standard models. Some of the Limited and Special Edition basses come with Bartolini electronics/pickups or Seymour Duncan pickups instead of MEC, the Warwick's default. There are approximately 30 Special Edition Corvettes made and three Limited Edition Corvettes.
