= Greg James (tattoo artist) =

American tattoo artist (1954–2026)

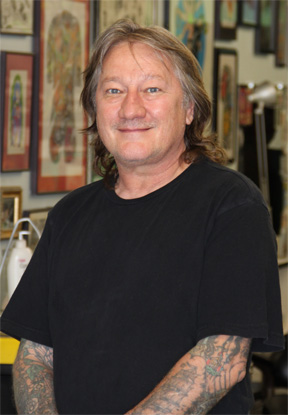
James in 2012

Gregory James Schulthies (December 18, 1954 – June 4, 2026) was an American tattoo artist. Greg's tattoo designs and original artwork have appeared in magazines, books, documentaries, and at the Hard Rock Cafe.

== Background ==
Gregory James Schulthies was born in Chicago, Illinois, on December 18, 1954, to George Roland Schulthies and Margaret Hendricks Schulthies. He had one sister and two brothers. James had three children; two daughters and a son. He died in Elizabeth City, North Carolina on June 4, 2026, at the age of 71.

== Career ==
At the age of 14, James began drawing flash for his brother, Tennessee Dave, and eventually apprenticed with him in 1976. From single-needle black-and-gray work to classic Americana tattoos and ultimately the large, custom Japanese artwork for which he has become well-known, James tattooed continuously in Los Angeles (on Main Street in downtown L.A. and also the Pike, in Long Beach) for nine years as he continued to hone his craft.

=== Sunset Strip ===
"I wanted to do superlative work. So, I made a choice. I would either quit tattooing or try to get in with Cliff Raven at Sunset Strip Tattoo. Cliff hired me. That's the beginning of the story."

In 1985, James joined Sunset Strip Tattoo in Hollywood. Originally opened by Lyle Tuttle in the 1960s, the shop was then owned by Cliff Raven and subsequently Robert Benedetti, pioneers and innovators in the Japanese style of tattooing.

During his almost 40 year career, James also apprenticed numerous other tattoo artists, notably Chris Clemence of Montauk Tattoo.

=== Notable clients ===
Russell Mitchell, CEO of Exile Cycles with tattoos by Greg James: full sleeves and two hikae, or chest panels, featuring a blue dragon and orange koi.

- Pat Badger, of Extreme
- Frankie Banali, of Quiet Riot
- Nuno Bettencourt, of Extreme
- Bobby Blotzer, of Ratt
- John Corabi, of Mötley Crüe
- Sarah Michelle Gellar, actress
- Tracii Guns, of L. A. Guns
- Jesse James, West Coast Choppers
- Joan Jett
- Tommy Lee, of Mötley Crüe
- Mick Mars, of Mötley Crüe
- Vince Neil, of Mötley Crüe
- Keith Nelson, of Buckcherry
- Ozzy Osbourne
- Ashley Purdy, of Black Veil Brides
- Denise Richards
- Charlie Sheen
- Nikki Sixx, of Mötley Crüe
- Rick Stratton, makeup/special effects artist
- Joshua Todd, of Buckcherry

=== Tattoos Deluxe ===
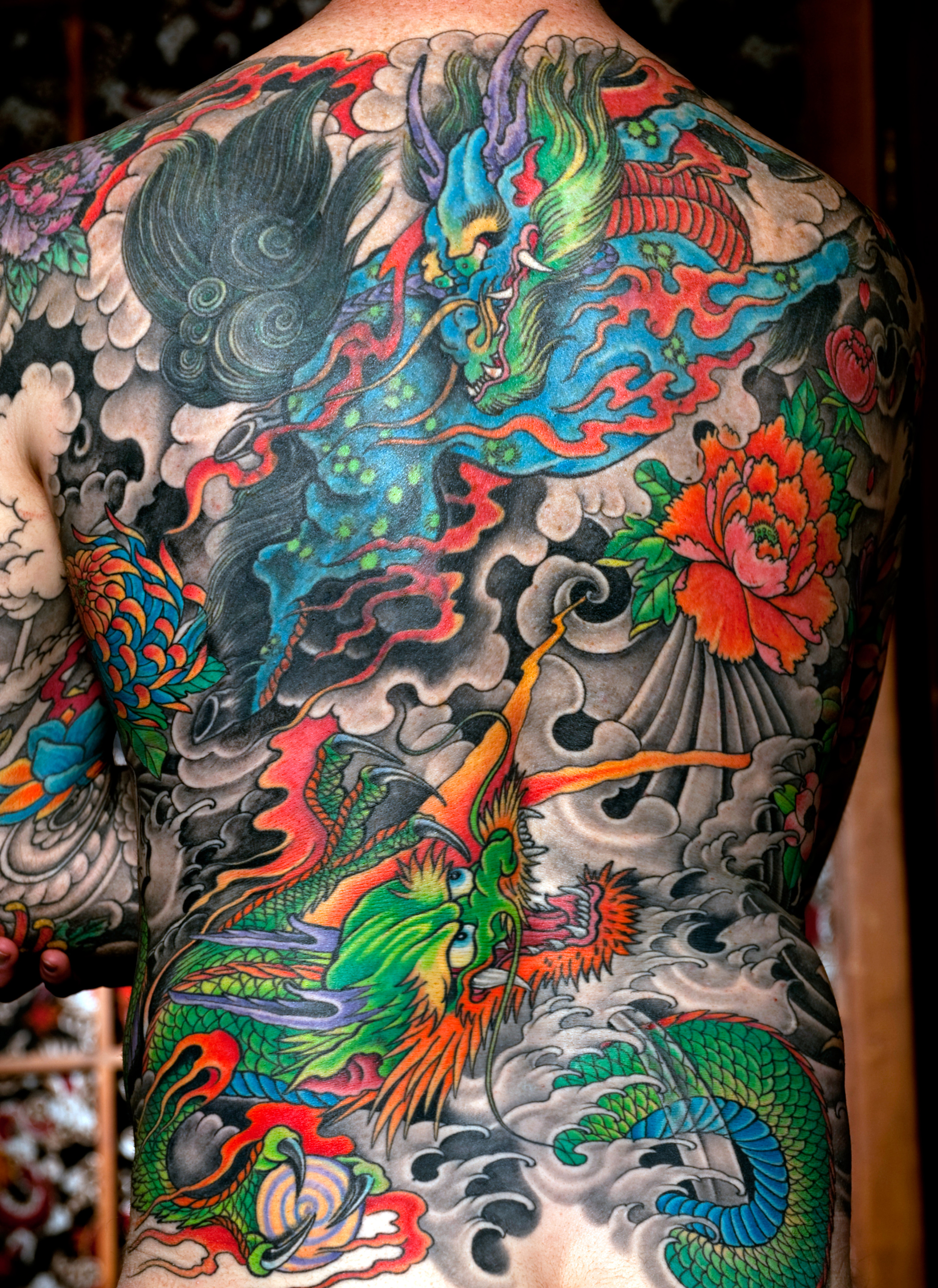
Custom Japanese backpiece tattoo by Greg James of Tattoos Deluxe.

In September 2012, James opened his own tattoo studio, Tattoos Deluxe, in Sherman Oaks, California.

Of tattooing, Greg says that "So much of what we do is really a personal thing between two people. It's not about the art so much, or the craft, or being the cool guy." "Tattooing to me is like welding. You have to lay the lines down. You're using tools. It [the tattoo] should look like it's always been there. Like it's part of your body." "You know, the average person today thinks tattoo artists nowadays are rock stars. But we go through a lot. We really put a lot effort, time, and communication into what we do. And it's permanent. You can't tear it up and throw it away when you're done with it. All these tattoos that I've done for thirty years--I carry those around in my head with me."

== Documentaries ==
- Skin Deep: Sunset Strip Tattoo
- Tattoo! Beauty, Art, and Pain on the Discovery Channel.
- Tattooed by Brandon Green, an independent film currently in production by Evergreenimages.

== Featured artwork ==
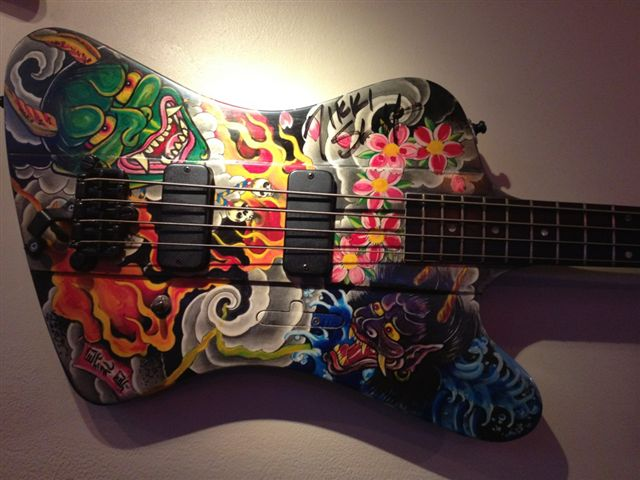
Custom bass at the Hard Rock Cafe in Tampa, Florida, hand-painted by Greg James for Nikki Sixx of Mötley Crüe.

- Greg hand-painted a custom bass for Nikki Sixx of Mötley Crüe after tattooing the band while on tour with them. It's installed as Memorabilia in the Hard Rock Cafe of Tampa, Florida.
- The Tattoo Encyclopedia: A Guide to Choosing Your Tattoo (with Terisa Green, published by Simon & Schuster, 2003) - Greg illustrated hundreds of tattoo designs for this popular book, sold globally in four languages with 50,000 copies in print. It is perennially an Amazon Top 100 bestseller in Education & Reference > Encyclopedias > Art.
- Skin & Ink Magazine (2003 - 2005) - Featured column "What Tattoos Mean" with Dr. Green.
- Ink: The Not-Just-Skin-Deep Guide to Getting a Tattoo (published by Penguin, 2005) - Contributing tattoo artist.
- Tattoo Savage Magazine - Black Veil Brides: Day of the Dead
- Tattoo Magazine - The Art of Greg James.
- Tattoo Planet Magazine
