= Too Young to Die (song) =

1993 single by Jamiroquai

Single by Jamiroquai

from the album Emergency on Planet Earth
- B-side: "Too Young to Die" (instrumental)
- Released: 1 December 1992
- Genre: Funk; acid jazz; soul jazz
- Length: 6:05: 3:12 (radio edit)
- Label: Sony Soho Square
- Songwriters: Jason Kay; Toby Smith
- Producer: Jason Kay

Jamiroquai singles chronology
"When You Gonna Learn" (1992)	"Too Young to Die" (1992)	"Blow Your Mind" (1993)

Audio sample
- file; help

Music video
- "Too Young to Die" on YouTube

"Too Young to Die" is a song by British funk and acid jazz band Jamiroquai, released in December 1992 by Sony Soho Square as the second single from their debut studio album, Emergency on Planet Earth (1993). The song was written by lead singer Jason Kay and Toby Smith, and produced by Kay. The original version of the track runs at 10:18; however, both the single and album versions were cut, running at 3:22 and 6:05, respectively. The single received positive reviews from music critics, who compared Jay Kay to Stevie Wonder.

Commercially, "Too Young to Die" peaked at number 10 on the UK Singles Chart and reached the top 50 in France, Iceland, the Netherlands, Sweden, and Switzerland. Its accompanying music video was directed by Earl Sebastion and filmed in New Mexico. The track's stems were made available to the public in March 2013 as part of a remix competition for the song; as such, there is an abundance of bootleg remixes to the song in addition to the official remixes. The competition was won by Australian DJ and music producer Late Nite Tuff Guy.

== Background ==
The commercial single includes all three versions of the track. The song's lyrics are about the fear of war and death due to political machinations. The single's cover art depicts Jay Kay in the background, looking into the camera, with a sky-blue "grill" of the Buffalo Man in the left, as hollow spots, which are slowly morphing into solid blue crosses (specifically, headstones), which are the polar opposites to the meaning of the buffalo man. This morphing happens as one moves their eyes from left to right over the cover of the single. There is also a banner near the bottom of the sleeve which has several images on it, including a picture of a baby with a caption beside it reading "Too Young to Die", an image of the mushroom cloud, and a Swastika, with the latter having a red "X" over it. The violin from the song was sampled in the drum & bass D'Cruze song "Lonely" in 1994 on Suburban Base Records.

== Critical reception ==
Peter Paphides from Melody Maker named "Too Young to Die" Single of the Week, along with "When You Gonna Learn", adding that it "takes the mood down a touch and sees Jamiroquai daubing a rudimentary batch of anti-war sentiments with an invigorating joie de vivre. [...] 'Too Young to Die' complements its predecessor as wonderfully as an Irish coffee after a steak platter." Pan-European magazine Music & Media noted its "uplifting strings intro" and "Jay's "Stevie Wonder"-ful voice [that] grabs the melody and envelopes itself in a warm overcoat of horns, funky guitar and intricate percussion accompaniment worthy of a Roy Ayers set. "Real" music for the acid jazzed amongst you." Alan Jones from Music Week described the song as a "loose and attractive retro-funk workout that owes more to the Seventies than the Nineties." Sam Steele from NME wrote, "'Jam-ir-o-kwai' ... got it? Good. Remember it, because the big voice and even bigger hats are unlikely to go away. Jay, the wearer of the wholly tea-cosy (and son of jazz singer Mary Kay), has one of the most powerful and impressive soul voices to slide across the dance spectrum in a long while."

Kevin L. Carter from Philadelphia Inquirer commented, "Jamiroquai is a big Stevie Wonder fan. His vocal flourishes and hooks on 'Too Young to Die' are obvious borrowings, but they're done so earnestly, and the song is so deftly arranged, it just about gets over." Dr Bob Jones from the Record Mirror Dance Update stated, "This is pure soul jazz with the funky bassline. A simple worldly message is scattered over a tight rhythm section with horn stabs Seventies-style. Pure class — one to raise some dust!" Stuart Maconie from Select said, "Full of twitching syncopation and that scat singing line that should have Mr Wonder on the phone to his lawyers." Tony Cross from Smash Hits gave it a score of four out of five, writing, "Led by the young (but still Stevie Wonder sounding) lead singer Jay, Jamiroquai have updated dark and dirty '70s funk. This is a stylish anti-war song that has really got what it takes. The obscenely talented Jamiroquai will go from strength to strength." Another Smash Hits editor, Pete Stanton, noted that it "feature a multitude of enticing grooves (plus plenty of do-do-do-dad-dos)."

== Music video ==
A music video was shot for "Too Young to Die". It was directed by Earl Sebastion and filmed in New Mexico, consisting mainly of Jay Kay singing in what appears to be a desert military installation. The video was produced by Paul McPadden for M-Ocean and was released on 1 March 1993.

== Track listings ==
- UK 12-inch vinyl
1. "Too Young to Die" (extended version) – 10:18
2. "Too Young to Die" (original) – 6:05
3. "Too Young to Die" (instrumental) – 6:22
- UK CD single
1. "Too Young to Die" (7-inch edit) – 3:22
2. "Too Young to Die" (extended version) – 10:18
3. "Too Young to Die" (original) – 6:05
4. "Too Young to Die" (instrumental) – 6:22
- Japanese CD single
1. "Too Young to Die" (7-inch edit) – 3:22
2. "When You Gonna Learn" (Digeridoo) – 3:48
3. "Too Young to Die" (original) – 6:05
4. "When You Gonna Learn" (Cante Hondo mix) – 5:49

== Charts ==
=== Weekly charts ===
Chart (1993)	Peak position
Australia (ARIA)	53
Europe (Eurochart Hot 100)	31
Europe (European Dance Radio)	3
Finland (Suomen virallinen lista)	15
France (SNEP)	33
Iceland (Íslenski Listinn Topp 40)	25
Netherlands (Dutch Top 40 Tipparade)	9
Netherlands (Single Top 100)	41
Sweden (Sverigetopplistan)	30
Switzerland (Schweizer Hitparade)	21
UK Singles (Official Charts)	10
UK Airplay (Music Week)	7
UK Dance (Music Week)	1

=== Year-end charts ===
Chart (1993)	Position
Europe (European Dance Radio)	23

== Release history ==
Region	Date	Format(s)	Label(s)	Ref.
United Kingdom	1 March 1993	12-inch vinyl; CD; cassette	Sony Soho Square	
Australia	5 April 1993	CD; cassette	Sony Soho Square	
Japan	21 April 1993	CD	Epic	

== See also ==
- List of anti-war songs
