= Emergency on Planet Earth =

Studio album by Jamiroquai
- Released: 14 June 1993
- Recorded: 1992–1993
- Genres: Acid jazz; soul; funk
- Length: 64:03 (original) (Note: The original double LP release of Emergency on Planet Earth runs about nine minutes longer than all subsequent releases, as the following three tracks were shortened: "When You Gonna Learn (Digeridoo)" (6:22, cut to 3:47); "Too Young to Die" (10:08, cut to 6:04); "If I Like It, I Do It" (6:58, cut to 4:53)); 55:01
- Labels: Sony Soho Square (UK); Columbia (US); Epic (Japan)
- Producers: Jay Kay; Toby Smith; Stuart Zender; Mike Nielsen

Jamiroquai chronology
Emergency on Planet Earth (1993)	The Return of the Space Cowboy (1994)

Singles from Emergency on Planet Earth
- 1. "When You Gonna Learn" Released: 19 October 1992; 2. "Too Young to Die" Released: 1 March 1993; 3. "Blow Your Mind" Released: 24 May 1993; 4. "Emergency on Planet Earth" Released: 2 August 1993

Emergency on Planet Earth is the debut studio album by English funk and acid jazz band Jamiroquai, released on 14 June 1993 under Sony Soho Square. Prior to its release, the band debuted in 1992 with "When You Gonna Learn" under Acid Jazz Records, and front-man Jay Kay was given a major-label deal with Sony Music. The album was produced as Toby, Stuart and Kay formed the band and is characterised by its acid jazz foundations, layers of instrumentation and socially charged lyrics.

Critical reviews of the album were generally positive and noted its 1970s stylings. It reached number one in the UK Albums Chart and sold over 1,200,000 copies worldwide. Its single "Too Young to Die" peaked at number 10 in the UK Singles Chart. A remastered version of the album was released in 2013 to coincide with the 20th anniversary of the album's release, including a new vinyl release.

== Background and composition ==
"I wanted this to be an album, not a collection of three minute songs. I didn't want tracks to be rigid, stuck in that verse, chorus, verse, chorus thing. All the people I'd been listening to were jazz-fusion bands, they didn't do three minute tracks, they just played."

— Kay, 2013

While Jay Kay was sending songs to record companies, he wrote the first track "When You Gonna Learn" after taking inspiration from Native American and First Nation peoples and their philosophies, and from his anger towards the shooting of elephants in a television programme. The song also "takes on everything from racism to corporate greed," according to Interview. Kay said the track laid down "the sound, the flavor [and] the concept" of the album. After he had it recorded, Kay fought with his producer, who took out half the lyrics and produced the song based on what was charting at the time. With the track restored to his preference, the experience helped Kay realise he "wanted a proper live band with a proper live sound". The band would be named "Jamiroquai", a blend of the words "jam" and the name of a Native American confederacy, the Iroquois.

Kay gradually gathered band members, including Wallis Buchanan, who played the didgeridoo, and Stuart Zender, who became the band's bassist by audition. Kay's manager scouted keyboardist Toby Smith, who joined the group as Kay's songwriting partner. Together, they wrote the second track, "Too Young to Die", a song also inspired by Kay's anger towards the wars he had seen on television. Regarding how the track was written, Kay said in 2013: "I have a very limited musical ability in terms of playing", so he would sing the instruments as Smith would work out the chords. The two tracks would shape up the album, which are followed up by the "high-kicking" funk track "Hooked Up". With the fourth track "If I Like It I Do It" Kay said it reminded him of "Harvest for the World" by Isley Brothers. The former song's lyrics have been described as anarchist: "The kids want the system breaking down/Not higher education/If it ain't no natural law/Then you can keep your regulations". "Music of the Mind" is a laid-back Latin fusion track that takes inspiration from Flora Purim's song "Moon Dreams".

With the title track, Kay said that it ultimately defined the concept of the album: "The whole groove of it, all the syncopation, the strings gliding over the top... and the lyrics were hammer to the nail: 'The kids need education/and the streets are never clean/... is that life that I am witnessing/or just another wasted birth'". Kay wanted to re-create the Headhunters' song "God Made Me Funky" with his own track "Whatever It Is, I Just Can't Stop", and he credits having "a real drummer" for its "funky feel". "Blow Your Mind" is a soft track intended to last eight and half minutes long. The track was recorded in one take; Kay said: "the brass was feeling so nice that when we got to the end I didn't want it to stop, so I motioned to the guys to go again, which is why there's the reprise." For the ten-minute track "Revolution 1993", the track has "paramilitary drums" and a Minimoog played underneath the bass. With the lyrics, Kay said "it rounded off all the other things I've been saying on the album". It also has "crisscrossed ascending and descending lines, James Brown-like brass punches, a female rhythm and blues choir, Mitch Mitchellesque drums, African percussion, up-front funk bass and elements of hip hop, fusion, acid jazz, technopop and ragamuffin." The album ends with the "didgeridoo workout" track "Didgin' Out".

== Release ==
Emergency on Planet Earth was released on 17 June 1993 under Sony Soho Square. In the United States, it was released under Columbia. Its inner sleeve contains a manifesto by Kay regarding the environment. The album reached number 1 in the UK albums chart and was certified Platinum, indicating it has sold 300,000 copies in the country. It became the fastest-selling album in the country since Faith (1987) by George Michael. In France, it ranked number 7 in its SNEP Album Charts. In the country's year-end chart, it ranked number 14. The album ranked number 5 in the Swiss Album Charts, where it was certified Gold. In Japan, it ranked number 40 in the Oricon Charts, receiving a Platinum certification. The album reached number 15 in the Dutch Album Top 100 and sold 50,000 copies, certifying it as Gold. It also reached number 84 on its year-end chart. Overall, the album sold 1,200,000 copies. In 2013, Emergency on Planet Earth was one of the first three albums to be re-issued on the band's 20th anniversary campaign, also containing a bonus disc with remixes, demos, live performances and B-sides.

"When You Gonna Learn" was released as the lead single from the album on 19 October 1992 via Acid Jazz Records. The band were offered major label contracts after its release and Kay signed with Sony. (Note: Kay was the only member under contract.) The single charted at number 52 in the UK Singles Chart. The music video for the song "mix[es] images of cruelty, blight, disaster and genocide". Because it featured the Holocaust, it was banned in American MTV. "Too Young to Die" was released as the second single from the album on 1 March 1993, reaching number 10 in the UK. "Blow Your Mind" was released as the third single from the album on 24 May 1993. The single peaked at #12 on the UK Singles Chart. "Emergency on Planet Earth" was released as the fourth single from the album on 2 August 1993. The track peaked at number 32 on the UK Singles Chart. "When You Gonna Learn" was re-released by Sony Records as the fifth and final single from the album on 13 September 1993. The re-release was slightly more successful than the original, peaking at number 28 on the UK Singles Chart.

The gatefold art by James Marsh helps highlight the band's affinity for nature and shows artistic depictions of the band's members at the time: L–R: Nick Van Gelder, Wallis Buchanan, Stuart Zender, Toby Smith, and Jay Kay.

== Reception ==
Professional ratings
Review scores
Source	Rating
AllMusic	4/5 stars
Encyclopedia of Popular Music	3/5 stars
Entertainment Weekly	B+
MusicHound	3/5
Music Week	4/5 stars
The Philadelphia Inquirer	.
Q	4/5 stars
The Rolling Stone Album Guide	2/5 stars
Select	4/5
Smash Hits	4/5 stars
Uncut	8/10

Critics have noted the layers of instrumentation on Emergency on Planet Earth, including its horn and string arrangements and the digeridoo, which "few '70s soul artists employed", according to J.D. Considine. Praising Kay's vocals, Christopher Dawes of Melody Maker said "Stevie Wonder and Aaron Neville were the instant reference points." Entertainment Weekly described the album as helping the band "turn out gritty organic grooves with enthusiasm." Q magazine gave the album 4 out of 5 stars, describing it as "A funky and beautiful record, a contender for best British soul album of the '90s, and frankly better than anything Stevie Wonder has made since Hotter Than July." BBC Music claims – "it laid the foundations for an acid-jazz sound that the band would continue to build upon for the next decade and a half." Mike Zwerin of The New York Times called the album "a rare treasure, contemporary pop music with mass potential worth a detour". Tony Parsons of The Daily Telegraph stated that the band "take[s] every cliche in the soul handbook and somehow turn it into a thing of beauty. [Kay] calls women 'sexy ladies' and says things like 'you blow my mind' and 'no more wars,' yet somehow these stale sentiments are rendered fresh and fragrant and really rather wonderful."

A Billboard Magazine reviewer argued that "although Kaye [sic] tries to bring a modern vibe to his music, mostly he operates within '70s parameters." David Sinclair of The Times wrote that the band "have recorded a debut which combines youthful brio with musicianship of the very highest order. And, so long as one takes the absurdly earnest, politically correct tone of the lyrics with a sizable pinch of salt, it's a lot of fun too." Mark Jenkins of The Washington Post questioned the band's socially charged lyrics, and further wrote of the album: "Derived from the lush, silky '70s funk and soul of Philadelphia International and Stevie Wonder, Jamiroquai's sound is about as revolutionary as a nonreturnable bottle of Pepsi."

=== Accolades ===
A year after the album's release, Jamiroquai were nominated for Brit Award for Best New Artist, Best British Group and Best British Dance Act. Emergency on Planet Earth was nominated for Best British Album and the music video for "Too Young to Die" was nominated for Best British Video. In 1996, Mixmag placed the album at number 17 in its The 50 Best Dance Albums of All Time list. Fnac ranked the album at 229 in its 1000 Best Albums of All Time and listed it as a Key album in The Ideal Discography: 823 Indispensables Albums (2015). In their year-end lists, The Face ranked it at number 14, while Musikexpress ranked it at number 34. The album also was listed in the book 1001 Albums You Must Hear Before You Die.

== Track listing ==
All tracks are written by Jay Kay and Toby Smith, except where noted.

No.	Title	Writer(s)	Length
1.	"When You Gonna Learn (Digeridoo)"	Kay	3:47
2.	"Too Young to Die"		6:04
3.	"Hooked Up"		4:37
4.	"If I Like It, I Do It"	Kay; Nick Van Gelder	4:53
5.	"Music of the Mind" (instrumental)		6:22
6.	"Emergency on Planet Earth"		4:04
7.	"Whatever It Is, I Just Can't Stop"	Kay	4:07
8.	"Blow Your Mind"		8:33
9.	"Revolution 1993"		10:17
10.	"Didgin' Out" (instrumental)	Kay; Wallis Buchanan	2:35
Total length:			55:01

20th Anniversary Reissue Bonus Disc
No.	Title	Writer(s)	Length
1.	"When You Gonna Learn" (Cante Hondo Mix)	Kay	5:47
2.	"When You Gonna Learn" (Live at the Leadmill)	Kay	9:49
3.	"Too Young to Die" (Extended Mix)		10:12
4.	"If I Like It, I Do It" (Acoustic)	Kay; Van Gelder	4:24
5.	"Emergency on Planet Earth" (London Rican Mix)		7:14
6.	"Revolution 1993" (Original Demo)		10:20
7.	"Didgin' Out" (Live at the Milky Way, Amsterdam)	Kay; Buchanan	3:25
8.	"Brothers Like You" (Live at Glastonbury)	Kay	4:32
9.	"God Make Me Funky" (Live at Glastonbury)	Bennie Maupin; Bill Summers; Paul Jackson; Mike Clark; DeWayne McKnight	4:25
10.	"Music of the Mind" (Live at Glastonbury)		6:19
Total length:			66:08

== Personnel ==
Credits for Emergency on Planet Earth adapted from album liner notes.

Jamiroquai

- Jay Kay – vocals, production
- Wallis Buchanan – didgeridoo
- Toby Smith – keyboard, string arrangements, production
- Stuart Zender – bass
- Nick Van Gelder – drums
- John Thirkell – trumpet, flugelhorn
- Gary Barnacle – flute, saxophone
- Peter Thoms - trombone
- Andrew Levy – bass (track 1)
- Gavin Dodds – guitar
- Simon Bartholomew – guitar
- Glen Nightingale – guitar
- DJ D-Zire – turntables
- Kofi Kari Kari – percussion
- Maurizio Ravalico – percussion (tracks 2, 5, 9)

Additional musicians

- Linda Lewis – additional background vocals
- Vanessa Simon – additional background vocals
- Mike Smith – additional saxophone, flute
- Mike Nielsen – production
- The Reggae Philharmonic Strings – strings
- Jono Podmore – String Arrangements

Technical personnel

- James Marsh – Illustrator

== Charts ==
=== Weekly charts ===
Weekly chart performance for Emergency on Planet Earth
Chart	Position
Australian Albums (ARIA)	21
Austrian Albums (Ö3 Austria)	11
Dutch Albums (Album Top 100)	15
French Albums (SNEP)	7
German Albums (Offizielle Top 100)	17
Japanese Albums (Oricon)	40
New Zealand Albums (RMNZ)	27
Scottish Albums (Official Charts)	28
Swedish Albums (Sverigetopplistan)	13
Swiss Albums (Schweizer Hitparade)	5
UK Albums (Official Charts)	1

=== Year-end charts ===
Year-end chart performance for Emergency on Planet Earth
Chart (1993)	Position
Dutch Albums (Album Top 100)	84
French Albums (SNEP)	14

== Certifications and sales ==
Region	Certification	Certified units/sales
France (SNEP)	Platinum	300,000^{*}
Japan (RIAJ)	Platinum	200,000^{^}
Netherlands (NVPI)	Gold	50,000^{^}
Switzerland (IFPI Switzerland)	Gold	25,000^{^}
United Kingdom (BPI)	Platinum	300,000^{^}
Summaries
Worldwide	—	1,200,000
^{*} Sales figures based on certification alone.^{^} Shipments figures based on certification alone.
