= Balans =

Slovenian post-punk band

balans
- Origin: Ljubljana, Slovenija
- Genres: Post-punk, art punk
- Years active: 2013–today
- Labels: KAPA Records; ŠOP Records
- Members: Kristin Čona; Andrej Pervanje
- Past members: Alessandro di Giampietro; Jan Kmet

balans (stylized in lowercase) is a Ljubljana-based bunkerpop/art punk music group formed in 2013 by Andrej Pervanje and Kristin Čona. The group positions itself within the contemporary musical avant-garde, blending elements of Yugoslav punk with various modern performative approaches. It is known for its distinctly artistic approach to music creation and visual presentation, regularly collaborating with artists, fashion designers, and photographers.

== History ==
Their debut physical album, titled Bunkerpop, was released in 2017 by the independent label ŠOP Records.

In February 2018, ŠOP Records released their second physical album titled Kva je s tabo... to critical acclaim. The same year, they were chosen to perform on the 18th tour of Club Marathon, which Radio Študent organises in order to support and promote the domestic musical scene.

In January 2019, they were invited to perform at the 5th edition of the MENT festival in Ljubljana. On May 13, their next physical album A vam je jasno was released, which they promoted with a concert tour from Vienna to Skopje. In that time, they were chosen as one of the INES Talent 2020 and got more positive reviews regarding their work.

After their tour, they were invited to an art residency at Layer House in Kranj, free to pick the collaborator(s) of their choice. Balans invited members of Belgrade independent label Krava 22, of the art space Kvaka 22, and recorded an album under the name New Balkan Wife.

In January 2020, they recorded their sixth studio album, Sam pravm, at Radio Študent Ljubljana. It was released later in the year at the independent label KAPA Records. The album was nominated for IMPALA’s European Independent Album of the Year Award 2020. In January 2021, the single Dežuje was ranked the third-best single in the Balkan region by the regional association of independent record labels RUNDA, while the album placed sixth in the best album category, making it the highest-ranked Slovenian release.

In November 2020, balans released a live session in collaboration with the MENT festival and the UK festival Liverpool Sound City. The session featured four tracks recorded by the Diskont Films production team during a performance at the Rutar department store.

In 2021, the group contributed three tracks to the feature film Prasica, slabšalni izraz za žensko, which received the Vesna Award for Best Feature Film that same year.

In May 2023, balans released their seventh album, Nima smisla, through KAPA Records, issued both on vinyl and in digital format. Contributors to the album included Jan Kmet (drums), Jan Bajc Funa (recording engineer), Jan Brovč (costume design), Mario Zupanov (photography), and Primož Zorko (visual design). The music video for the track Ti si ogenj, created by artist Petra Korent, received the award for Best Music Video of 2024 at the Tresk Festival's visual competition.

In June 2025, the group performed at the 17th edition of the InMusic Festival in Zagreb. In 2023, they performed alongside the English post-punk band Dry Cleaning at the Sexto ’Nplugged festival in Italy.

== Members ==
- Andrej Pervanje – bass guitar, vocals, drum machine (2013–)
- Kristin Čona – vocals, electric guitar, bass guitar (2013–)
- Jan Kmet – drums, synthesiser, drum machine (2020–2025)
- Alessandro di Giampietro – visual representation of the band (2016–2020)

== Discography ==
=== Albums ===
- Praske na parketu (self-released, 2015)
- LPT (self-released, 2016)
- Bunkerpop (ŠOP Records, 2017)
- Kva je s tabo ... včer sm šou na bus, voznik ni hotu, da grem, brez da plačam urbano, pa mu rečem sori, k ta mesec nisem dobil plače, pa mi reče jz tud ne, pol me on gleda kva je s tabo pa ga jz gledam kva je s tabo, pol grem na bus pa je vse v redu (ŠOP Records, 2018)
- A vam je jasno (ŠOP Records, 2019)
- Sam pravm (KAPA Records, 2020)
- Nima smisla (KAPA Records, 2023)

=== Compilations ===
- Klubski maraton 2018 (ZARŠ, 2018)
- Sounds from Slovenian Bedroom (ŠOP Records, 2018)
- Slovenian moMENT 2019 (MENT, 2019)
- Sounds from Slovenian Bedrooms II (ŠOP Records, 2019)
- Sounds from Slovenian Bedrooms III α & Ω (ŠOP Records, 2020)
- ŠOP xmas (s)hits (ŠOP Records, 2020)
