= Streamer bass =

Bass guitar produced by the Warwick company

Warwick Streamer Bass
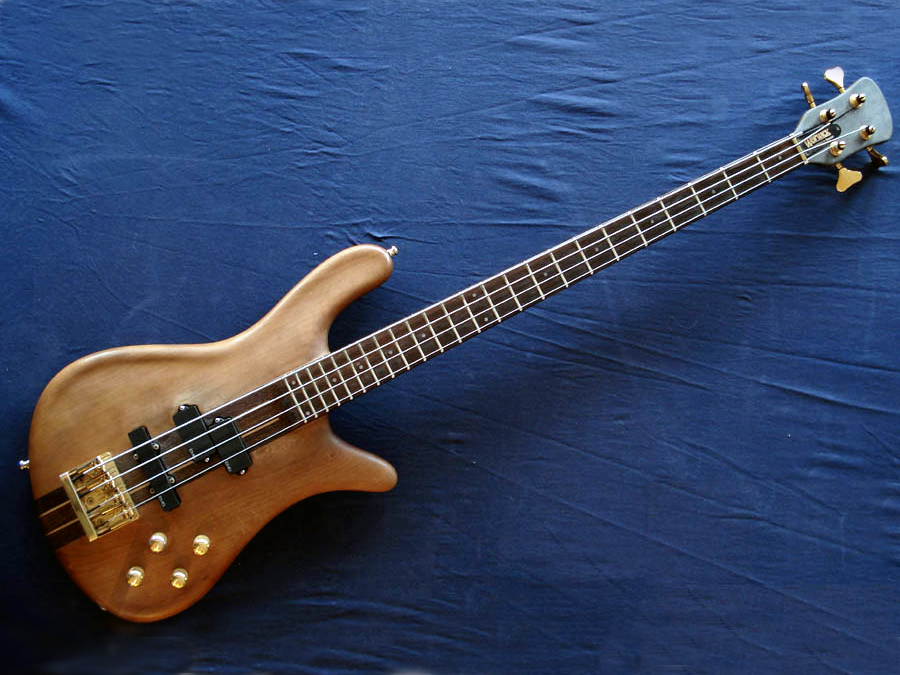
- Streamer from 1983
- Manufacturer: Warwick
- Period: 1982–present

Construction
- Body type: Solid
- Neck joint: neck through body & bolt on

Woods
- Body: maple
- Neck: Wenge
- Fretboard: Wenge ebony, maple

Hardware
- Bridge: Two piece
- Pickup: Usually J

Colors available
- Burst, Natural, Satin

The Streamer bass is a bass guitar manufactured by the Warwick company and launched in 1982.

The headstock design was changed around 1985 to be replaced with the current style headstock, and the original one piece bridge was later changed to the two piece style seen in current Warwick basses. Since the 1990s, Streamer basses have used MEC pickups and electronics (on certain models, most often on Limited and Special Edition series, Seymour Duncan and Bartolinis are used).

== Streamer LX ==
The Streamer LX was added to the Warwick roster in 1996. The 4-string Streamer LX is equipped with a P/J-pickup configuration, the 5-string it equipped with a J/J-configuration and the 6-string is equipped with a dual humbucker setup. Like most Warwicks, the Streamer LX is constructed with some unusual woods - a Maple, Cherry or Swamp ash body, a bolt on Wenge or Ovangkol neck and a Wenge fingerboard.

== Streamer Jazzman ==
The Streamer Jazzman was created in 2000. After the Warwick FNA Jazzman was created in 1999, Warwick decided it was necessary to make the Streamer version. The Streamer Jazzman earned its name because of its pickup configuration; a slanted Jazz Bass pickup near the neck and a Music Man humbucking pickup near the bridge.

== Notable players ==
- P-Nut
- Robert Trujillo
- Mike Inez
- Stuart Zender
- Dougie "D-Funk" Ryniker
- Dan Lilker
- Kyle Sokol
- Troy Sanders
- T.M. Stevens
- Paul Gray
- Dirk Lance
- Shavo Odadjian
- Justin Chancellor
- Doug Wimbish
- Chris Wolstenholme

== Design similarity to Spector NS-Basses ==
It was well documented that the first versions of the Streamer were near exact copies of the NS-Bass. The Spector NS-Bass was designed by Ned Steinberger for Stuart Spector in 1977, five years before Warwick was formed.

In the May 2012 article titled "Meet Your Maker: Hans Peter Wilfer of Warwick", an interview with Warwick founder and CEO in Bass Player, the following history is given explaining Wilfer's decision to make copies of the highly sought-after Spector NS-Bass: "'We didn’t see any reason to build Fender copycats, which players could get easily and cheaply from Asia, so we decided to focus only on high-end, innovative instruments.' In the mid ’80s, the Spector NS was tracking well in the U.S., but these basses proved hard to come by in Europe. H.P. saw that problem as a potential solution for the direction of his company and took up the task of designing his own version of this popular, ergonomically friendly instrument. That venture resulted in Warwick’s first widely successful instrument: the Streamer Stage I."

At the annual Musikmesse Show (Frankfurt, Germany) in 1985, Stuart Spector became aware that a new German-based company was producing exact copies of his now famous NS-Bass. Spector, along with Ned Steinberger, confronted Hans Wilfer and he agreed to pay a licensing fee to both Spector Guitars and Ned Steinberger in return for being able to continue to produce the Streamer without legal action.

Shortly after this agreement was reached, Spector was sold to Kramer Guitars. The new owners had no interest in pursuing Warwick to enforce the licensing agreement and Warwick continued to make the Streamer without any consequence.

In 1990, Kramer became insolvent and filed for bankruptcy. In the wake of their financial failure, Stuart Spector formed Stuart Spector Design, LTD. in 1992. In 1997 after a lengthy court battle, Stuart Spector was awarded the trademark and copyrights to Spector and threatened to sue Warwick to enforce the 1985 license agreement.

The pending litigation was eventually dropped because Warwick had changed the Streamer design and it was no longer an exact copy of the NS-Bass. In time, Warwick has evolved the design of the Streamer while Spector has sought to preserve the classic elements of the NS-Bass.

== Words from Spector side ==
This was from PJ Rubal's email, National Product Manager and Artist Relations for Spector.

"The truth is that Ned designed the NS curved body shape for Spector in March 1977. This was Ned’s first musical instrument design, and an instant hit. Warwick came on to the scene in 1984 with their Streamer bass, a different version of the now very popular Spector NS. When approached by Spector, Warwick did agree to and did pay royalties (for a while) to Spector for their error. Stuart sold Spector to Kramer after that. Warwick stopped paying, Kramer chose not to pursue them."

== External links & references ==
- The Official Stuart Spector Design, LTD. Website - Company History
- Warwick Official Website
