= When You Gonna Learn =

1992 single by Jamiroquai

Single by Jamiroquai

from the album Emergency on Planet Earth
- B-side: "Didgin' Out" (Live)
- Released: October 1992
- Genre: Funk; acid jazz
- Length: 3:50 (album version); 6:20 (JK mix)
- Label: Acid Jazz Records; Epic Records; S2
- Songwriter: Jay Kay
- Producers: Mike Neilsen; Jason Kay

Jamiroquai singles chronology
| "When You Gonna Learn" (1992) | "Too Young to Die" (1993) |

Audio sample
- file; help

Music video
- "When You Gonna Learn" on YouTube

"When You Gonna Learn" (sometimes rendered as "When You Gonna Learn?") is a song by British funk/acid jazz band Jamiroquai, released as their debut single. It was originally released in October 1992 by Acid Jazz Records (as an act of goodwill to the label and to give the record "street cred") before being re-released on Sony Records in September 1993 as the lead single from the band's debut studio album, Emergency on Planet Earth (1993). The lyrical themes, like many of Jamiroquai's early songs, speak of environmental awareness and unfettered capitalism. Its music video was directed by Morgan Lawley and was banned from MTV in its original edit.

== Recording ==
The demo was recorded without didgeridoo player Wallis Buchanan. While the most commonly known version of the song lasts for 3:50 (and can be found on the band's CD version and digital copies), another, longer version exists. Known as the "JK mix", it lasts for 6:20 and appears on the vinyl version of the Emergency on Planet Earth album as well as on the "When You Gonna Learn" and "Blow Your Mind" singles. The Brand New Heavies played on a demo.

== Samples ==
"When You Gonna Learn" was not actually the first single written and issued by Jay Kay, although it is the first single as Jamiroquai. Kay's first single was a white-label acetate called "Natural Energy", which was pressed only in three copies.

Kiss 100 FM was the first radio station to play the single, in the summer of 1992. The chord progressions of the song bear a striking resemblance to the chord progressions of a Johnny "Hammond" Smith track called "Los Conquistadores Chocolatés", taken from his 1975 album Gears. The booklet of the Acid Jazz Records release of the single bears a "special thanks" note to Smith, who gave permission to Kay to use the composition's structure. It is unknown whether Hammond received any royalties. A high-quality rip of "Natural Energy" can be found on YouTube.

When you Gonna Learn (Canté Hondo mix) (1992)
Cante Hondo Mix

The chord progressions of the Cantè Hondo Mix of the song bear even more resemblance to "Los Conquistadores Chocolatés". The Cantè Hondo Mixes also uses the wind sound effect from Hammond's song. The cover used by Acid Jazz Records is completely different from the cover on Sony's release, although a Spanish promo issued by Sony bears the Acid Jazz Records cover. There have been legal disputes between Acid Jazz Records and Epic Records because Epic re-released the single without Acid Jazz Records' consent.

== Lyrics ==
A protest song, the band does not hold back from criticising a cavalcade of social, political, humanitarian, racial, and environmental injustices, including greed at the expense of the planet. Some of the lyrics may be open to interpretation.

Lyrics such as "The hypocrites, we are their slaves" may be interpreted as Thomas Jefferson writing "All men are created equal" while simultaneously enslaving over 600 African Americans for his own personal use, hypocrisy which itself was latched on very early by American slaves and their defenders and further propagated by abolitionists and social reformers such as Frederick Douglass. Supporting this interpretation are lyrics from the song "Manifest Destiny", which appears on Jamiroquai's follow-up album, The Return of the Space Cowboy. On the other hand, it could also be interpreted that many people are slaves to a corrupt capitalist system.

Kay also references the song "River Deep – Mountain High" during the chorus with the lyrics:

Mountain high and river deep,

Stop it goin' on

We gotta wake this world up from its sleep

Oh, people, Stop it goin' on

== Critical reception ==
Larry Flick from Billboard magazine felt the UK nouveau-soul artist "kicks a hearty vocal performance, amid a stack of brassy horns and jiggly funk guitars. Comparisons to Simply Red are in the offing, even though J's composition has a more jazz-injected tone." He also wrote that he thought it was a "wonderfully creative and accessible shoulder-shaker". Dave Sholin from the Gavin Report said, "Music with a message can be exciting. Woven into this retro-melody are some disturbing yet thought-provoking lyrics about the state of our environment." Peter Paphides from Melody Maker named it Single of the Week, along with "Too Young to Die", adding: "'When You Gonna Learn' freewheels into view with a hypnotic didgeridoo rumble, imploding instantly when Jay Kay open his mouth to reveal a joyous set of pipes last seen with the plot that Stevie Wonder lost in 1981." Another Melody Maker music critic, Push, praised it as "absolutely glorious".

Pan-European magazine Music & Media commented, "Hats off for J.K.'s original idea to introduce a digeridoo to '70s soul. Even better are the intelligent anti-war lyrics. Perhaps Arafat and Rabin have received a copy." Andy Beevers from Music Week gave "When You Gonna Learn" a top score of five out of five, stating that "this is arguably his best song". James Hamilton from the Record Mirror Dance Update described it as a "Stevie Wonder-ish "Johannesburg"-style jogger with strange didgeridoo and strings woven rare groove-type [song]". Stuart Maconie from Select wrote that it "combine[s] chamber strings with bar-room funk sweatiness to brilliant effect." Tom Doyle from Smash Hits rated it four out of five, naming it a "brilliant eco-friendly dance tune", noting "its lazy rare groovy feel and top lyrics about the mindless exploitation of the planet". Another editor from Smash Hits, Pete Stanton, also gave it four out five, remarking that it "feature[s] a multitude of enticing grooves (plus plenty of do-do-do-dad-dos)."

== Music video ==
A music video directed by Morgan Lawley was shot for "When You Gonna Learn". It has symbolic shots of lead singer Jay Kay being restrained and suffering as an allusion to the suffering of animals. This is accentuated by intercut graphic stock footage of animals being experimented on, seals being clubbed, and whaling operations. Other consequential historical events such as Nazism and the Fall of the Berlin Wall are also included. The original version was banned from MTV because of the confronting imagery; it was replaced with a "cleaner" edit. The uncut video can be viewed on YouTube. When Kay talked about the video in an interview, he stated that it had been his intention to make an intense 'shock video', depicting various experiments done on animals, whaling operations, and the Nazis, all in the most negative light: "I remember I did the video in America, and I remember the video got banned—you know, the video got banned. Well, because I just went to Greenpeace and just took loads of footage of stuff... stuff that I just didn't think was right. So, well, they [the American censors] said, 'Hey, we can't play that; it's got, like, the Nazi party in there—we can't play that'". He also said in 1993 that "I wasn't trying to compare it to environmental issues. But I put in those images of the Holocaust because if you can't see that Nazism is on the rise, if you don't remind people, then it's just going to come back."

== Impact and legacy ==
In 1994, NME featured "When You Gonna Learn" in their "Top ten vibin' modern soul-jazz masterstrokes that every 'face' should own", writing: "It would all go horribly wrong later of course (post Acid jazz, bien sur), but here Jason Kaye [sic] is marvellous, warbling about hearing the news and predicting imminent nuclear destruction like the half-hatted, honey-voiced Ealing Nostradamus he unquestionably was. For a bit."

== Track listing ==
- Acid Jazz Records CD single
1. "When You Gonna Learn" (Digeridoo) – 3:47
2. "When You Gonna Learn" (Digeridon't) – 3:55
3. "When You Gonna Learn" (JK Extended Mix) – 6:20
4. "When You Gonna Learn" (Canté Hondo Mix) – 5:47
5. "When You Gonna Learn" (Original Demo) – 4:50
6. "When You Gonna Learn" (Canté Hondo Instrumental) – 5:47
- Acid Jazz Records 12" vinyl
1. "When You Gonna Learn" (JK Extended Mix) – 6:20
2. "When You Gonna Learn" (JK Instrumental) – 6:20
3. "When You Gonna Learn" (Canté Hondo Mix) – 5:47
4. "When You Gonna Learn" (Original Demo) – 4:50
5. "When You Gonna Learn" (Digeridoo Instrumental) – 6:28
- Acid Jazz Records 7" vinyl
1. "When You Gonna Learn" (Digeridoo) – 3:47
2. "When You Gonna Learn" (Digeridon't) – 3:55
- Sony Records CD single
1. "When You Gonna Learn" (Digeridoo) – 3:47
2. "Didgin' Out" (Live at the Milky Way, Amsterdam) – 3:27
3. "Too Young to Die" (Live at Leadmill, Sheffield) – 5:25
4. "When You Gonna Learn" (Canté Hondo Mix) – 5:47
- Sony Records Cassette single
1. "When You Gonna Learn" (Digeridoo) – 3:47
2. "Didgin' Out" (Live at the Milky Way, Amsterdam) – 3:27
- Sony Records 12" vinyl
1. "When You Gonna Learn" (JK Extended Mix) – 6:20
2. "When You Gonna Learn" (JK Instrumental) – 6:20
3. "When You Gonna Learn" (Live at Leadmill, Sheffield) – 9:50
4. "When You Gonna Learn" (Canté Hondo Mix) – 5:47
5. "When You Gonna Learn" (Original Demo) – 4:50
6. "When You Gonna Learn" (Digeridoo Instrumental) – 6:28
- Australian CD single / American CD single / American 12" vinyl
1. "When You Gonna Learn" (Digeridoo) – 3:47
2. "When You Gonna Learn" (Digeridon't) – 3:55
3. "When You Gonna Learn" (JK Extended Mix) – 6:20
4. "When You Gonna Learn" (Canté Hondo Mix) – 5:47
5. "When You Gonna Learn" (Original Demo) – 4:50
6. "When You Gonna Learn" (Digeridoo Instrumental) – 6:28
- American promotional CD single
1. "When You Gonna Learn" (Digeridoo Edit) – 2:57
2. "When You Gonna Learn" (Digeridon't Edit) – 3:01
- Japanese CD single
1. "When You Gonna Learn" (Digeridoo) – 3:47
2. "Too Young To Die" (7" Edit) – 3:22
3. "When You Gonna Learn" (Canté Hondo Mix) – 5:47
4. "Too Young To Die" (12" Version) – 6:04

== Charts ==
| Chart (1992–1993) | Peak position |
|---|---|
| Australia (ARIA) | 105 |
| Europe (Eurochart Hot 100) | 89 |
| Europe (European Dance Radio) | 23 |
| UK Singles (OCC) | 52 |
| UK Airplay (Music Week) | 30 |
| UK Dance (Music Week) | 1 |
| UK Club Chart (Music Week) | 21 |

== Credits ==
=== Jamiroquai ===
- Jay Kay – vocals
- Toby Smith – keyboard, string arrangements, production
- Stuart Zender – bass on "Too Young to Die", & "Didgin' Out
- John Thirkell – flugelhorn, trumpet
- Gary Barnacle – flute, saxophone
- Mike Smith – flute, saxophone
- Peter Thoms - trombone
- Kofi Kari Kari – percussion
- Maurizio Ravalico – percussion
- Nick Van Gelder – drums

=== Additional personnel ===
- Wallis Buchanan – didgeridoo
- Andrew Levy – bass
- The Reggae Philharmonic Strings – strings
- Jono Podmore – string arrangements
