= Clemencia (name) =

Clemencia is used as a given name and a surname. Notable people with the name include:

== Given name ==
- Clemencia Coetzee, Namibian politician
- Clemencia López (c. 1876 – 1963), Filipina activist
- Clemencia Rodriguez, Colombian US-based media and communication scholar

== Surname ==
- Joceline Clemencia (1952–2011), Afro-Curaçaoan writer and linguist
