= Chris Clemence =

American musician and tattoo artist

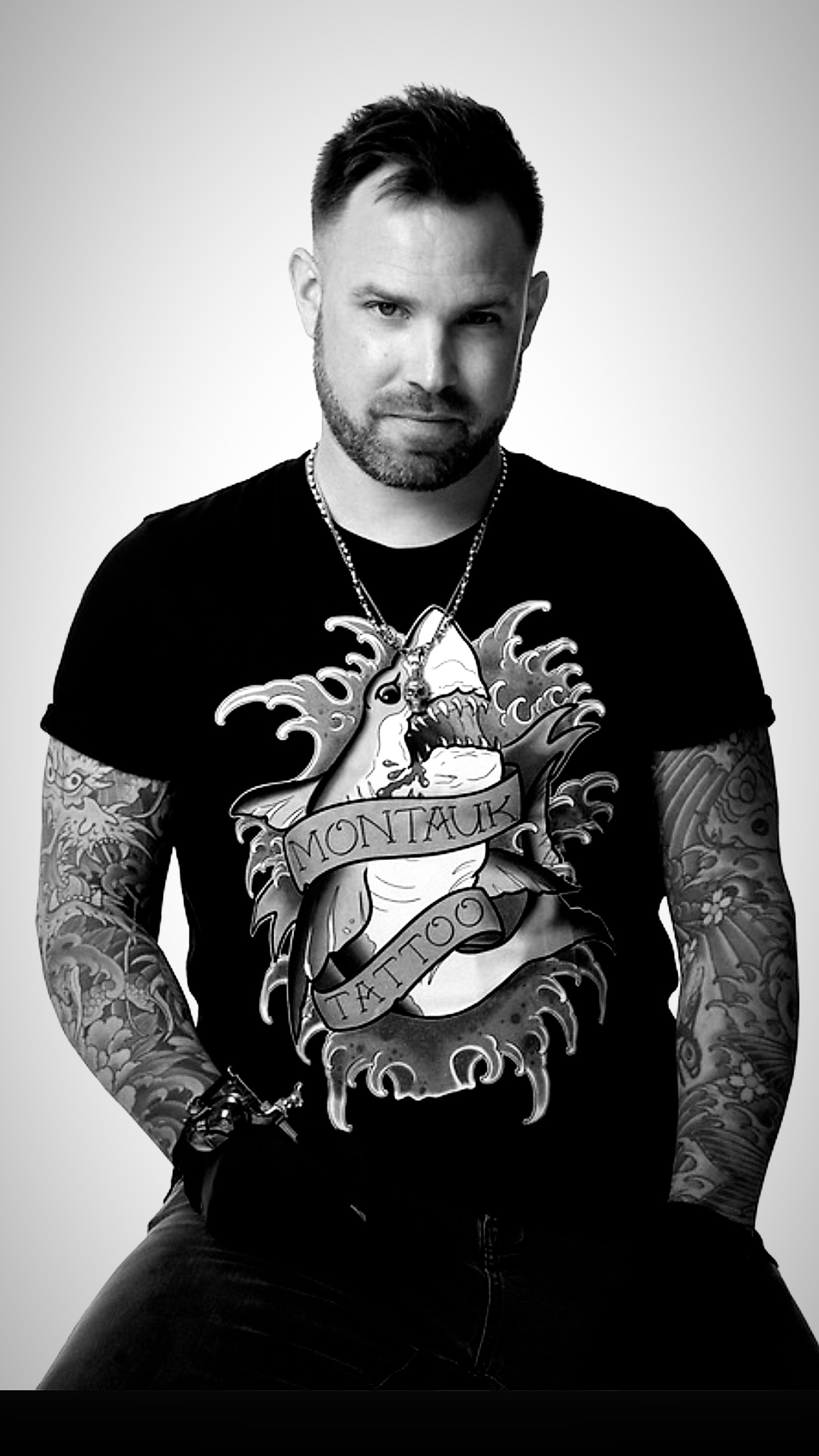
Chris Clemence in 2023.

Chris Clemence (born March 17, 1986) is an American tattoo artist. He is also a songwriter, bassist, and fashion designer. As a musician he is best known for his work as a solo artist and as a member of RapScallions. Clemence is currently the owner of Montauk Tattoo located in Montauk, New York as well as his stylized shoe brand Tattshoos.

== Biography ==
Clemence grew up in East Hampton, New York.

== Music career ==
Chris has co-written several hit songs including "California Brain" off of RapScallions first self-titled EP released in 2011. "California Brain" was featured in Ubisoft's "Rocksmith" on Xbox and PlayStation. Clemence and the band earned a Platinum Video Game Award for "California Brain" selling over 5 million copies worldwide in Rocksmith. "California Brain" charted at #70 and was listed as #10 in the Top Songs about California in 2011 among Rihanna, Britney Spears, and Death Cab For Cutie.

In 2013 RapScallions released "Got Your Love Comin'". The single was featured as iHeart Radio's "Music You Should Know" on over 65 Clear Channel radio stations nationwide.

In 2014 RapScallions released "Can You Feel It". The single became a sports anthem, airing in the stadiums of many NHL, NFL, NBA, and MLB teams during their games. "Can You Feel It" was also aired at the World Cup 2014, The Stanley Cup Finals 2015, and Super Bowl XLIX. The song was also featured in Carl's Jr. All Natural Burger campaign "Can You Feel It" was licensed by Harley-Davidson for a radio ad campaign.

As a solo artist Clemence wrote the New York anthem "Let's Go" that was an official song for the NY Rangers, NY Giants, and NY Knicks with Cro Mags founder Harley Flanagan, and Madison Square Garden DJ Ray Castoldi that was released in 2016. The song was played during games at Madison Square Garden and Giants Stadium. The song also aired at NRG Stadium in Houston during Super Bowl LI.

In 2017 Clemence co-wrote "Revolution" with Dead Kennedy's DH Peligro.

Clemence has been featured in several brand collaborations for advertisements including Bentley Motors and William Henry Jewelry.

== Tattoo career ==
Chris completed a traditional tattoo apprenticeship under legendary tattoo artist Greg James in Los Angeles and worked at Tattoos Deluxe before opening Montauk Tattoo in Montauk, New York. He regularly tours across the United States, tattooing in Los Angeles, Las Vegas, Scottsdale, New York City and Detroit.

In 2020 Clemence organized a partnership with the Los Angeles Kings to do hockey style flash tattoos for LA King's fans.

Clemence is also the owner of Tattshoos, a stylized shoe brand featuring his custom hand painted designs. In 2021 ePlay Digital announced a collaboration with Tattshoos and Howie Mandel to create an exclusive line of digital and physical sneakers for mobile games, NFT marketplaces, in the Klocked app.

=== Notable clients ===
- Stephen Pearcy of Ratt
- DH Peligro of Dead Kennedys
- Steve Johnson
- Stuart Hamm
- Chris Iorio of Adelitas Way
- Chad Cherry of The Last Vegas
- Kat Nestel
- Cameron Noori
