= RapScallions =

American rock band

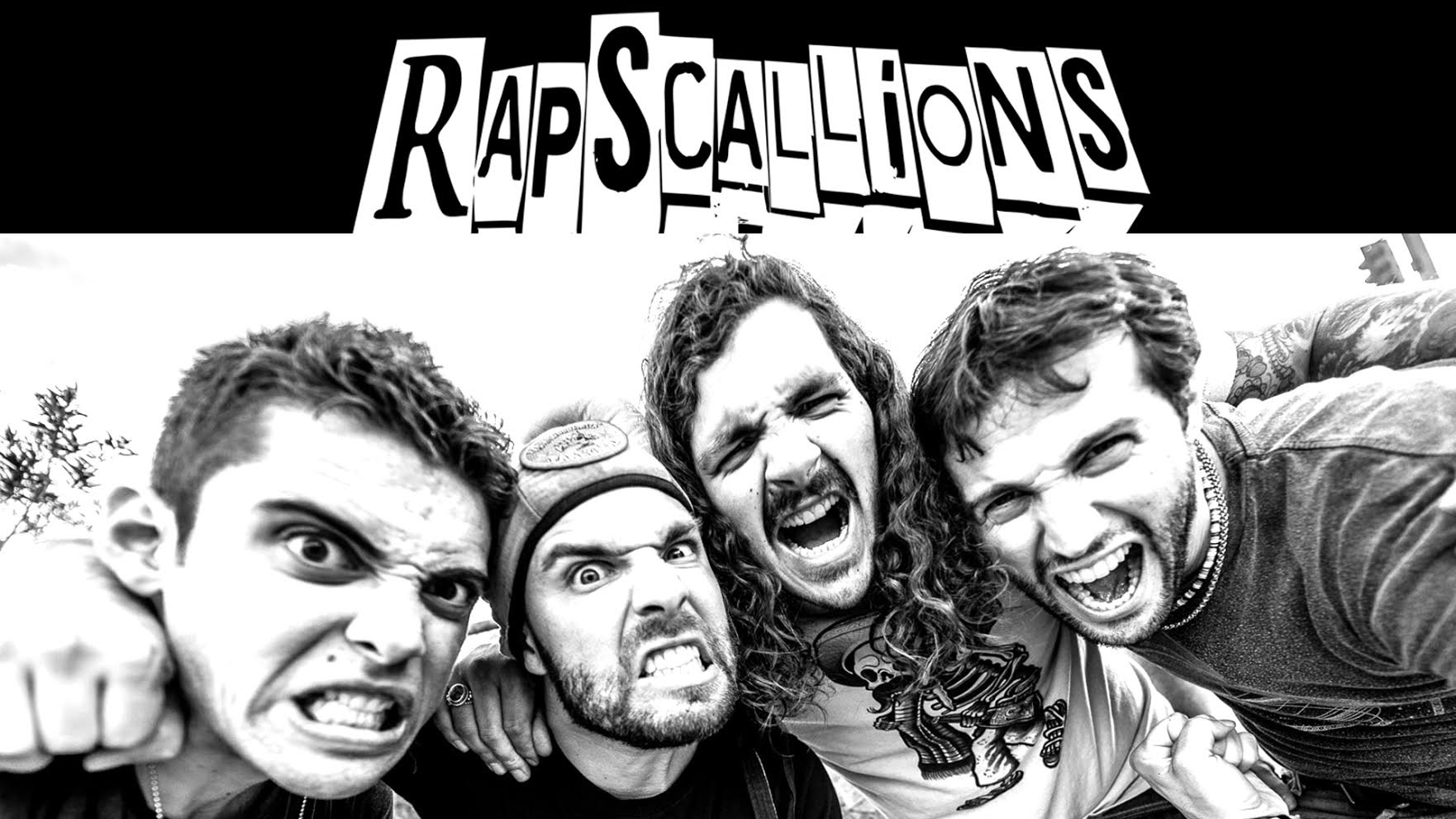
- Los Angeles, 2015

Background information
- Origin: Hollywood, California
- Genres: Rock, alternative rock
- Years active: 2011–present
- Members: Sergio Ochoa; Chris Clemence; Dario Forzato; James Forsberg

RapScallions is an American rock band formed in Hollywood, California in 2011 by Chris Clemence. The band is made up of bassist Chris Clemence, guitarist Dario Forzato, drummer James Forsberg, and vocalist Sergio Ochoa.

== Mainstream Success ==
In 2011 RapScallions released their first self-titled EP. The first single off the EP, "California Brain" helped the band gain mainstream recognition via the Ubisoft video game, Rocksmith, on Xbox and PlayStation 3 and earned the band their first platinum video game award. "California Brain" charted at #70 on the iTunes charts in Europe. California Brain was #10 in the Top 25 Songs about California in 2011 among Rihanna, Britney Spears, and Death Cab For Cutie.

In 2013, RapScallions released their second album, "In My Head". The single, "Got Your Love Comin", was in rotation on 65 Clear Channel radio stations nationwide by way of iHeart Radio and was selected as iHeart Radio’s "Music You Should Know.”

In 2014, RapScallions released "Can You Feel It" as the first single to their upcoming record. "Can You Feel It" was produced by Wendy Starland. The song quickly gained recognition in the sports world and was licensed to FOX Sports for the NHL and NBA as well as by teams such as, the Los Angeles Kings, New York Rangers, Colorado Avalanche, St. Louis Blues, Denver Broncos, Kansas City Chiefs, New York Giants, Indiana Pacers, Minnesota Twins and San Diego Padres for their in-game entertainment at their stadiums. "Can You Feel It", also received international radio play airing on radio stations such as, Q103.3 KTMQ, 94.5 KYMT, on KIIS FM Brazil during the 2014 World Cup and was the kickoff song for the NFL International game in London. "Can You Feel It" also aired during Super Bowl XLIX and the 2015 Stanley Cup Playoffs.

RapScallions made their American television debut with a live performance of "Can You Feel It" on FOX Sports San Diego for the San Diego Padres opening day of their MLB season and have since performed the song on CBS for the Mercedes-Benz Music Minute during David Letterman. "Can You Feel It" was also licensed by Harley-Davidson for a radio ad campaign airing on stations in California, Denver, Kansas City, and Boston.

RapScallions are featured performing "Can You Feel It" in the Spring 2015 Carl's Jr. commercial that aired on CBS and KCAL.

On March 11, 2015 the mobile video game SongArc was released on iOS and Android. RapScallions are the featured artist of the game with their songs, "Can You Feel It", "Got Your Love Comin'" and "California Brain".

The band has shared the stage with Chad Smith of Red Hot Chili Peppers, Chris Cornell, Scorpions, The Red Jumpsuit Apparatus, Warrant, Fishbone, English Beat, and Mike Posner among others, playing in venues including the Staples Center, Mandalay Bay Events Center and the Detroit Speedway of Michigan. RapScallions third studio record, produced by Matt Wallace and Wendy Starland, and mixed by Chris Lord-Alge will be released in 2015.

On May 1, 2015, RapScallions performed before 100,000 fans at the Chang Jiang International Music Festival in China on the main stage.
