= Live in Verona (Jamiroquai album) =

Live album by Jamiroquai
- Released: 11 November 2002
- Recorded: 8 June 2002
- Venues: Verona Arena (Verona, Italy)
- Genres: Acid jazz, funk
- Length: 95:18
- Label: Sony

Jamiroquai chronology
A Funk Odyssey (2001)	Live in Verona (2002)	Late Night Tales: Jamiroquai (2003)

Live in Verona is a DVD of a concert performed by the British band Jamiroquai in Verona on 8 June 2002, when the band toured in support of their 2001 album A Funk Odyssey.

== Track listing ==
1. Twenty Zero One
2. Canned Heat
3. Bad Girls (Donna Summer cover)
4. Corner of the Earth
5. Virtual Insanity
6. Little L
7. High Times
8. Cosmic Girl
9. Main Vein – with Beverley Knight
10. Deeper Underground
11. Alright
12. Love Foolosophy – with Beverley Knight

== Personnel ==
- Jason Kay – vocals
- Matt Johnson – keyboards
- Simon Carter – keyboards
- Rob Harris – guitar, backing vocals
- Nick Fyffe – bass guitar
- Derrick McKenzie – drums
- Sola Akingbola – percussion, backing vocals
- Hazel Fernandez – backing vocals
- Dee Lewis – backing vocals
- Valerie Etienne – backing vocals

== Charts ==
=== Weekly charts ===
Chart (2002–04)	Peak position
Australian DVD chart (ARIA Charts)	2

=== Year-end charts ===
Chart (2002)	Position
Australian DVD chart (ARIA Charts)	40
Chart (2003)	Position
Australian DVD chart (ARIA Charts)	29

== Certifications ==
Region	Certification	Certified units/sales
Argentina (CAPIF)	Platinum	8,000^{^}
Australia (ARIA)	2× Platinum	30,000^{^}
France (SNEP)	2× Platinum	40,000^{*}
Portugal (AFP)	Gold	4,000^{^}
^{*} Sales figures based on certification alone.^{^} Shipments figures based on certification alone.
