= Black Capricorn Day =

1999 single by Jamiroquai

Single by Jamiroquai

from the album Synkronized
- Released: 3 November 1999
- Length: 5:43 (album version); 3:42 (radio edit)
- Label: Epic
- Songwriters: Jay Kay; Toby Smith; Wallis Buchanan; Simon Katz; Derrick McKenzie
- Producers: Jay Kay: Al Stone; Jay Kay

Jamiroquai singles chronology
"Supersonic" (1999)	"Black Capricorn Day" (1999)	"King for a Day" (1999)

Music video
- "Black Capricorn Day" on YouTube

"Black Capricorn Day" is a song by British funk and acid jazz band Jamiroquai, released as the third single from their fourth studio album, Synkronized. The single was released in November 1999 in Japan only. Despite the single never being available in the UK, the music video was included on the British version of the High Times: Singles 1992–2006 DVD.

The single contained remixes of previous hits "Canned Heat" and "Supersonic" but no remixes of "Black Capricorn Day". However, the song would later be remixed by French DJ Alex Gopher, titled "Black Capricorn Day (White Knights Remix)", on An Online Odyssey, a promotional album released in the summer of 2001 to promote the then-upcoming release of their next album, A Funk Odyssey.

== Music video ==
The video is influenced by Martin Scorsese's 1985 film After Hours. Lead character Jay Kay finds himself looking at a poster with his picture on which is written "BURGLAR STOP HIM". He is chased through the backstreets of Glasgow by a mob, eventually carjacking a moped and then a BMW 320 to escape them. He is then chased by the police, evading capture until he picks up Jamiroquai drummer Derrick McKenzie under a bridge. The two are found by a police helicopter and run into a warehouse, now chased by both the mob and the police. Jay runs up the stairs, following Derrick. Once they reach the roof, Derrick launches himself over a gap between buildings. With the mob after him, Jay sizes up the jump, and the last shot is of him leaping over the gap. Derrick's name is misspelled as "Derick" in the opening credits.

One version of the video included on the High Times DVD is the version as described above; however, the version broadcast on television in Japan and included on An Online Odyssey is slightly different: one five-second shot, which focuses in on the logo of the third Jamiroquai album, Travelling Without Moving, painted on a wooden panel lying on the ground in an alleyway, is cut.

== Track listing ==
1. "Black Capricorn Day" (radio edit) – 3:42
2. "Canned Heat" (MAW Remix) – 8:26
3. "Supersonic" (Restless Soul Main Vocal) – 7:35
4. "Supersonic" (Sharp Razor Remix) – 7:05

== Credits ==
=== Jamiroquai ===
- Jay Kay – vocals
- Simon Katz – guitar
- Nick Fyffe – bass
- Toby Smith – keyboards, keyboard programming
- Derrick McKenzie – drums

=== Session member ===
- Sola Akingbola – percussion
