= King for a Day (Jamiroquai song) =

1999 single by Jamiroquai

Single by Jamiroquai

from the album Synkronized
- B-side: "Planet Home" (remix)
- Released: 29 November 1999
- Length: 3:38
- Label: Sony Soho Square
- Songwriters: Jay Kay; Toby Smith; Sola Akingbola; Wallis Buchanan; Derek McKenzie
- Producer: Rick Pope

Jamiroquai singles chronology
"Black Capricorn Day" (1999)	"King for a Day" (1999)	"I'm in the Mood for Love" (2000)

Music video
- "King for a Day" on YouTube

"King for a Day" a song by British funk and acid jazz band Jamiroquai, released as the fourth and final single from their fourth studio album, Synkronized (1999). The song was written by Jay Kay. Upon its release on 29 November 1999, the song reached number 20 on the UK Singles Chart and number two in Iceland. The video features Jay Kay walking around an old mansion in a regal costume, where each room has a member of the band.

== Track listings ==
UK CD1

1. "King for a Day" – 3:38
2. "Planet Home" (Trabant Brothers Inc. remix) – 7:20
3. "Supersonic" (Dirty Rotten Scoundrels Ace Klub mix) – 6:58

UK CD2

1. "King for a Day" – 3:38
2. "Canned Heat" (Shanks & Bigfoot extended Master mix) – 6:29
3. "Supersonic" (radio edit) – 3:40
4. "Supersonic" (multimedia video version) – 3:56

UK cassette single and European CD single

1. "King for a Day" – 3:38
2. "Planet Home" (Trabant Brothers Inc. remix) – 7:20

European maxi-CD single

1. "King for a Day" – 3:38
2. "Planet Home" (Trabant Brothers Inc. remix) – 7:20
3. "Supersonic" (Dirty Rotten Scoundrels Ace Klub mix) – 6:58

== Charts ==
Chart (1999–2000)	Peak position
Belgium (Ultratip Bubbling Under Flanders)	16
Europe (Eurochart Hot 100)	68
Iceland (Íslenski Listinn Topp 40)	2
Netherlands (Single Top 100)	89
Scottish Singles Sales (Official Charts)	18
Switzerland (Schweizer Hitparade)	51
UK Singles (Official Charts)	20
