= Covers & Rarities =

Compilation album by The Temperance Movement
- Released: 26 November 2021
- Recorded: 2013–2016, 2018
- Studios: Fish Factory, Willesden, London (tracks 6–11); Metropolis Studios, London (track 1)
- Length: 42:46
- Label: Earache Records
- Producer: The Temperance Movement

The Temperance Movement chronology
A Deeper Cut (2018)	Covers & Rarities (2021)

Professional ratings
Review scores
Source	Rating
Classic Rock	3.5/5 stars

Covers & Rarities is a compilation album by the British rock band the Temperance Movement. It contains five covers recorded by the group and six bonus tracks from their first two albums.

== Background ==
=== Recording ===
The album was announced and released following an almost two year long hiatus by the Temperance Movement, brought about after their original frontman and songwriter Phil Campbell announced he was leaving the group. The album features no new recordings, except for "You Fool No One".

Tracks 6 to 11 were recorded during sessions for the group's first two albums between 2013 and 2015, and were included as bonus tracks on various different formats. "Up in the Sky" and "Tender" were recorded in 2014 at Abbey Road studios and were released on Record Store Day of that year. "Houses of the Holy" was recorded in 2015 for Mojo magazine's Physical Graffiti tribute album. "Ziggy Stardust" was recorded live on 27 January 2016 at O2 Forum Kentish Town, London and was released as a limited edition single on Record Store Day 2017.

"You Fool No One" was recorded as part of an unaired TV special on the group that was released onto the internet in November 2018.

=== Release ===
On 18 August 2021, Earache Records released a music video for "You Fool No One" to their YouTube channel, announcing the album's upcoming release, with a pre-order link in the description. The album was released on 26 November 2021. The following week, it entered the UK Albums Chart at number 38. Two months prior to the album's release, a second compilation titled Caught on Stage: Live & Acoustic was announced.

== Track listing ==
All tracks are written by The Temperance Movement except where noted. Songwriting credits taken from release.

No.	Title	Writer(s)	Length
1.	"You Fool No One" (featuring Ian Paice)	Deep Purple	3:46
2.	"Up in the Sky"	Noel Gallagher	3:45
3.	"Tender"	Blur	4:19
4.	"Houses of the Holy"	Jimmy Page; Robert Plant	3:51
5.	"Ziggy Stardust" (Live)	David Bowie	3:23
6.	"Already Know" (The Temperance Movement digital bonus track)		2:53
7.	"Mother's Eyes" (The Temperance Movement bonus track)		5:26
8.	"Turn" (The Temperance Movement LP bonus track)		3:53
9.	"Centrefold" (White Bear Deezer bonus track)		4:10
10.	"Do the Revelation" (White Bear bonus track)		3:24
11.	"Time Won't Leave" (White Bear CD bonus track)		3:51

Digital bonus track
No.	Title	Length
12.	"Long Run"	4:09

== Personnel ==
Adapted from album liner notes

- Ian Paice – Drums on "You Fool No One"

== Charts ==
Chart (2021)	Peak position
UK Albums (Official Charts)	38
