= Dynamite (Jamiroquai album) =

Studio album by Jamiroquai
- Released: 15 June 2005
- Recorded: 2003–2005
- Studios: Jam Studios, London, UK
- Genres: Nu-funk; R&B; soul; acid jazz; post-disco; soft rock; Electronica
- Length: 54:59
- Labels: Sony BMG; Epic
- Producers: Jay Kay; Mike Spencer

Jamiroquai chronology
Late Night Tales: Jamiroquai (2003)	Dynamite (2005)	High Times: Singles 1992–2006 (2006)

Jamiroquai studio album chronology
A Funk Odyssey (2001)	Dynamite (2005)	Rock Dust Light Star (2010)

Singles from Dynamite
- 1. "Feels Just Like It Should" Released: 6 June 2005; 2. "Seven Days in Sunny June" Released: 15 August 2005; 3. "(Don't) Give Hate a Chance" Released: 7 November 2005

Dynamite is the sixth studio album by English funk and acid jazz band Jamiroquai. It was released on 15 June 2005 in Japan, 20 June 2005 in the United Kingdom, 21 July 2005 in Australia, and 20 September 2005 in the United States. It is the band's first album to feature keyboardist Matt Johnson, who joined the band in 2002. This is also Jamiroquai's only album without an official bassist, as Nick Fyffe left the band prior to the recording sessions, while Paul Turner joined the band following the album's completion and release.

== Album information ==
The album was released after the 2004 film Napoleon Dynamite featured the Jamiroquai song "Canned Heat" in its climactic dance scene. "Feels Just Like It Should" was the first single, reaching No. 8 in its first week on the UK charts. It has since become a No. 1 hit on the Billboard dance charts in the United States. The single was also certified Gold in Japan for selling 100,000 copies. The second single, "Seven Days in Sunny June", was released in the UK in August 2005, peaking at No. 14 on the UK Singles Chart. The song also features in the film The Devil Wears Prada. On 7 November 2005, "(Don't) Give Hate A Chance" was released as the third single from the album. The politically driven video for the track was Jamiroquai's first animated clip; it features a Buffalo Man, complete with buffalo-horned hat, sunglasses, and tracksuit. The clip helped the track score Top 20 showings in UK charts such as the Smash Hits and Hit40UK charts, both of which take in radio and video airplay as well as sales. The track reached No. 27 on the official UK Singles Chart. The album was recorded in many locations, including singer Jay Kay's personal Chillington Studios.

== Reception ==
Professional ratings
Aggregate scores
Source	Rating
Metacritic	61/100
Review scores
Source	Rating
AllMusic	4/5 stars
Encyclopedia of Popular Music	3/5 stars
Entertainment Weekly	C−
Entertainment.ie	3/5 stars
The Guardian	3/5 stars
NME	1/5 stars
PopMatters	4/10
Q	4/5 stars
Uncut	3/5 stars
Urb	4/5 stars

The album peaked at No. 3 in the United Kingdom, becoming the first Jamiroquai album to chart outside the top two spots. Uncut gave the album 3 out of 5 stars, claiming "Jay Kay returns with another blast of super-slick soul". Vibe wrote that "The space cowboys return with a vengeance, sounding funky as ever."

== Track listing ==
No.	Title	Writer(s)	Length
1.	"Feels Just Like It Should"	Jay Kay	4:34
2.	"Dynamite"	Kay; Matt Johnson	4:57
3.	"Seven Days in Sunny June"	Kay; Johnson	3:59
4.	"Electric Mistress"	Kay; Johnson; Rob Harris	3:56
5.	"Starchild"	Kay; Harris	5:13
6.	"Love Blind"	Kay; Johnson; Harris	3:35
7.	"Talullah"	Kay; Harris	6:04
8.	"(Don't) Give Hate a Chance"	Kay; Johnson; Harris	5:02
9.	"World That He Wants"	Kay; Johnson	3:14
10.	"Black Devil Car"	Kay; Harris	4:45
11.	"Hot Tequila Brown"	Kay; Johnson; Harris	4:40
12.	"Time Won't Wait"	Kay; Johnson; Harris	5:01
Total length:			55:00

- Japanese bonus track

13. "Feels So Good" (Knee Deep Remix Edit) – 3:42

- DualDisc
1. "Dynamite in Enhanced Stereo" – 54:59
2. "Feels Just Like It Should" (video) – 4:34
3. "Seven Days in Sunny June" (video) – 3:59
4. "Feels Just Like It Should" (The Making Of) – 22:59
- Australian tour edition bonus disc
1. "Don't Give Hate a Chance" (Steve Mac Classic Remix)
2. "Don't Give Hate a Chance" (Freemasons Remix)
3. "Don't Give Hate a Chance" (Freemasons Dub)
4. "Seven Days in Sunny June" (Ashley Beedle Heavy Disco Dub)
5. "Seven Days in Sunny June" (Kraak & Smaak Remix)
6. "Seven Days in Sunny June" (Blackbeard Remix)
7. "Feels Just Like It Should" (Mark Ronson Remix 2)
8. "Feels Just Like It Should" (Timo Maas Remix)

Note: "Time Won't Wait" was not on the initial European and Australian release; in most regions, it was later added as a standard track. Additionally, some CD-r promos of the album include the track "Beatbox" (0:34) as Track 12.

== Personnel ==
Adapted credits from the liner notes of Dynamite.
Jamiroquai

- Jay Kay – lead vocals (all tracks), backing vocals (tracks 1–3, 6, 10–11), synthetic bass vocals (1), backing vocal arrangements (2, 4–8, 12)
- Rob Harris – guitar (tracks 1–8, 10–12)
- Matt Johnson – keyboards (1–6, 8, 10–12), piano (tracks 5, 8–9, 12), synthesizer bass (6), Fender Rhodes piano (7)
- Derrick McKenzie – drums (tracks 1, 3, 5–6, 8, 10–12), additional hi-hat percussion (2)
- Sola Akingbola – percussion (tracks 1, 3, 5, 10, 12)

Additional musicians

- Alex Meadows – bass (tracks 2, 10)
- Derrick McIntyre – bass (tracks 3, 5, 8, 12) additional bass (11)
- Randy Hope-Taylor – bass (track 7), additional bass (8)
- Miaer Lloyd aka DJ Snare – scratch DJ (track 6)
- Nathan Haines – flute, saxophone (track 7)
- Benjamin Wright – string section leader (tracks 5, 7–9, 12), string arrangements (5, 7–9, 12), brass section leader (12), brass arrangements (12)
- Mike Spencer – music programming (tracks 1–8, 10–12)
- Bridgette Blades – backing vocals (tracks 2, 5, 11–12)
- Alexandra Brown – backing vocals (tracks 2, 5, 11–12)
- Vann Johnson – backing vocals (tracks 2, 5, 11–12)
- Samantha Smith – backing vocals (track 4)
- Valerie Etienne – backing vocals (tracks 5, 7, 10)
- Hazel Fernandez – backing vocals (tracks 5, 7, 10)
- Audrey Martells – backing vocals (tracks 8)

Technical

- Mike Spencer – producer (all tracks), engineer (tracks 1, 3, 5, 7–10, 12), audio mixing (all tracks)
- Jay Kay – producer (2, 6, 8), artwork
- Rick Pope – recording engineer (tracks 1, 3, 5, 8, 10, 12)
- Reginald Dozier – recording engineer (tracks 7, 9)
- Nick Ferrero – recording engineer (track 9)
- Pablo Arraya – additional recording engineer (all tracks)
- Richard Bignell – additional recording engineer (all tracks)
- Tom Coyne – mastering
- Charlie Lightening – photography

== Charts ==
=== Weekly charts ===
Weekly chart performance for Dynamite
Chart (2005)	Peak position
Australian Albums (ARIA)	3
Austrian Albums (Ö3 Austria)	10
Belgian Albums (Ultratop Flanders)	15
Belgian Albums (Ultratop Wallonia)	10
Danish Albums (Hitlisten)	22
Dutch Albums (Album Top 100)	5
European Albums (Billboard)	2
Finnish Albums (Suomen virallinen lista)	6
French Albums (SNEP)	2
German Albums (Offizielle Top 100)	6
Hungarian Albums (MAHASZ)	9
Italian Albums (FIMI)	3
Japanese Albums (Oricon)	8
New Zealand Albums (RMNZ)	18
Portuguese Albums (AFP)	14
Spanish Albums (Promusicae)	18
Swedish Albums (Sverigetopplistan)	25
Swiss Albums (Schweizer Hitparade)	3
UK Albums (Official Charts)	3
US Billboard 200	145

=== Year-end charts ===
Year-end chart performance for Dynamite
Chart (2005)	Position
Australian Albums (ARIA)	59
Dutch Albums (Album Top 100)	60
European Albums (Billboard)	53
French Albums (SNEP)	111
German Albums (Offizielle Top 100)	87
Italian Albums (FIMI)	52
Japanese Albums (Oricon)	98
Swiss Albums (Schweizer Hitparade)	36
UK Albums (OCC)	68

== Certifications ==
Region	Certification	Certified units/sales
Australia (ARIA)	Gold	35,000^{^}
Ireland (IRMA)	Gold	7,500^{^}
Japan (RIAJ)	Gold	100,000^{^}
Switzerland (IFPI Switzerland)	Gold	20,000^{^}
United Kingdom (BPI)	Platinum	300,000^{^}
^{^} Shipments figures based on certification alone.
