= You Give Me Something (Jamiroquai song) =

2001 single by Jamiroquai

Single by Jamiroquai

from the album A Funk Odyssey
- B-side: "Do It Like We Used to Do"; "Main Vein" (live)
- Released: 12 November 2001
- Length: 3:24
- Label: Sony Soho Square
- Songwriters: Jay Kay; Rob Harris; Nick Fyffe
- Producer: Rick Pope

Jamiroquai singles chronology
"Little L" (2001)	"You Give Me Something" (2001)	"Love Foolosophy" (2002)

Music video
- "You Give Me Something" on YouTube

"You Give Me Something" is a song from British funk and acid jazz band Jamiroquai's fifth studio album, A Funk Odyssey (2001). Written by Jay Kay, Rob Harris, and Nick Fyffe, the song was released in November 2001 as the second single from the album. The track peaked at 16 on the UK Singles Chart, number 17 in Spain, and number 30 in France. It also charted number 2 on the Billboard Hot Dance Chart in the U.S. The song was the group's first single to be released on the DVD single format.

== Music video ==
When asked what he thought of the music video for the song, Jay Kay said, "That video is crap [...] My original idea had been tampered with by everyone from the record company to the management." He proposed the video to be shot in Ibiza, then changed to New York City, but his flight there scheduled on 11 September 2001 had to be cancelled. "We ended up doing it in the Docklands in London in the pissing rain. I wasn't very happy with it."

== Track listings ==
UK CD1

1. "You Give Me Something" (commercial edit)
2. "You Give Me Something" (Blacksmith RnB remix)
3. "You Give Me Something" (Full Intention remix)
4. "You Give Me Something" (Cosmos edit)
5. "You Give Me Something" (King Unique edit)
6. "You Give Me Something" (video)

UK CD2

1. "You Give Me Something" (commercial edit)
2. "You Give Me Something" (Full Intention remix)
3. "Do It Like We Used to Do"
4. "Main Vein" (live)
5. "Main Vein" (video live at Knebworth)

UK DVD single

1. "You Give Me Something" (video)
2. "Do It Like We Used to Do" (audio)
3. "Main Vein" (live audio)
4. "Virtual Insanity" (video clip)
5. "Cosmic Girl" (video clip)
6. "Deeper Underground" (video clip)
7. "Canned Heat" (video clip)

UK cassette single

1. "You Give Me Something"
2. "Do It Like We Used to Do"

European CD single

1. "You Give Me Something" (commercial edit)
2. "You Give Me Something" (Full Intention club mix)

US CD single

1. "You Give Me Something" (Mike City remix) – 3:44
2. "You Give Me Something" (Full Intention club mix) – 7:11
3. "You Give Me Something" (Full Intention dub mix) – 7:22
4. "You Give Me Something" (Blacksmith R&B remix) – 4:01

Australian CD single

1. "You Give Me Something"
2. "You Give Me Something" (King Unique Saki Session)
3. "You Give Me Something" (Cosmos Deep Space Mix)
4. "You Give Me Something" (Full Intention club mix)
5. "You Give Me Something" (Blacksmith R&B 12-inch rub)

== Charts ==
=== Weekly charts ===
Weekly chart performance for "You Give Me Something"
Chart (2001–2002)	Peak position
Australia (ARIA)	34
Belgium (Ultratip Bubbling Under Flanders)	8
Belgium (Ultratip Bubbling Under Wallonia)	3
Europe (Eurochart Hot 100)	49
France (SNEP)	30
Ireland (IRMA)	40
Italy (FIMI)	20
Netherlands (Dutch Top 40 Tipparade)	11
Netherlands (Single Top 100)	86
Scottish Singles Sales (Official Charts)	21
Spain (Promusicae)	17
Switzerland (Schweizer Hitparade)	61
UK Singles (Official Charts)	16
UK Hip Hop/R&B (Official Charts)	6
US Dance Club Songs (Billboard)	2

=== Year-end charts ===
Year-end chart performance for "You Give Me Something"
Chart (2002)	Position
US Dance Club Play (Billboard)	12

== Certifications ==
Certifications for "You Give Me Something"
Region	Certification	Certified units/sales
Mexico (AMPROFON)	Gold	30,000^{‡}
United Kingdom (BPI) Sales since 2004	Silver	200,000^{‡}
^{‡} Sales+streaming figures based on certification alone.

== Release history ==
Release dates and formats for "You Give Me Something"
Region	Date	Format(s)	Label(s)	Ref(s).
United States	6 November 2001	Rhythmic contemporary radio	Epic	
Germany	12 November 2001	CD	Sony Soho Square	
Austria	12 November 2001	CD	Sony Soho Square	
Switzerland	12 November 2001	CD	Sony Soho Square	
United States	13 November 2001	Contemporary hit radio	Epic	
United Kingdom	19 November 2001	CD; cassette; DVD	Sony Soho Square	
Australia	26 November 2001	CD	Sony Soho Square; Columbia	
Japan	5 December 2001	CD	Epic	
