= Lil' Dub Chefin' =

2002 single by Spacemonkeyz vs Gorillaz

Single by Spacemonkeyz vs Gorillaz

from the album Laika Come Home
- B-side: "Spacemonkeyz Theme"
- Released: 22 July 2002 (UK); 13 August 2002 (US)
- Recorded: 2000–2002
- Genre: Dub; ska; reggae
- Length: 4:41 (album version); 3:02 (radio edit)
- Label: Parlophone; Astralwerks
- Songwriters: Damon Albarn; Jamie Hewlett; Darren Galea · Richie Stevens · Gavin Dodds; John Harrison
- Producers: Spacemonkeyz; Gorillaz; Dan the Automator; Jason Cox; Tom Girling

Gorillaz singles chronology
"Tomorrow Comes Today" (2002)	"Lil' Dub Chefin'" (2002)	"Feel Good Inc." (2005)

Music video
- "Lil' Dub Chefin'" (reupload) on YouTube

"Lil' Dub Chefin'" is a single by Spacemonkeyz vs Gorillaz, from the 2002 Gorillaz remix album Laika Come Home. It is sung by Damon Albarn and Terry Hall of the UK ska band the Specials with the song itself being a remix of the Gorillaz song "M1 A1". The song's title is reference to the UK restaurant chain Little Chef. The music video features the Spacemonkeyz. On Phase One: Celebrity Take Down, the video had an alternative intro and credits. The single peaked at No. 73 on the UK Singles Chart.

This track was only performed once on the band's first tour, Gorillaz Live, in 2002 with Terry Hall returning to sing it. Later, it was played live regularly during the last leg of The Now Now Tour as an outro to the original song it remixes, "M1 A1".

== Track listings ==
European and UK CD maxi-single

1. "Lil' Dub Chefin'" (Album Version) – 4:41
2. "Lil' Dub Chefin'" (Radio Edit) – 3:02
3. "Spacemonkeyz Theme" – 5:19
4. "Lil' Dub Chefin'" (Video) – 3:31

UK 10-inch vinyl single

1. "Lil' Dub Chefin'" (Album Version) – 4:41
2. "Lil' Dub Chefin'" (Radio Edit) – 3:02
3. "Spacemonkeyz Theme" – 5:19

== Personnel ==
- Damon Albarn – vocals
- Terry Hall – vocals
- Mike Smith – horn, horn arrangement
- Dennis Rollins – horn
- Dominic Glover – horn
- Phil Soul – bass
- Dubversive – keyboards, bass guitar, guitar
- D-Zire – sampled loops, drum programming
- Gavva – drum programming
- Simon Katz – organ
- Jeff Scantlebury – percussion
- Jason Cox – engineering
- Tom Girling – engineering, Pro Tools

== Charts ==
Chart performance for "Lil' Dub Chefin'"
Chart (2002)	Peak position
UK Singles (OCC)	73
