= Live in Verona =

Live in Verona may refer to:

- Live in Verona (Jamiroquai album)
- Live in Verona (Deep Purple album)
