= Love Foolosophy =

2002 single by Jamiroquai

Single by Jamiroquai

from the album A Funk Odyssey
- B-side: "Black Crow" (live); "Picture of My Life" (live)
- Released: 25 February 2002
- Length: 3:45
- Label: Sony Soho Square
- Songwriters: Jay Kay; Toby Smith
- Producer: Rick Pope

Jamiroquai singles chronology
"You Give Me Something" (2001)	"Love Foolosophy" (2002)	"Corner of the Earth" (2002)

Music video
- "Love Foolosophy" on YouTube

"Love Foolosophy" is the third single from British funk and acid jazz band Jamiroquai's fifth studio album, A Funk Odyssey (2001). The song was written by Jason Kay and Toby Smith. The song's title is a play on words, using a made-up portmanteau of "fool" and "philosophy" to express how he is a fool for love. The song peaked at number 14 on the UK Singles Chart and reached the top 20 in Australia, Italy, and Spain.

== Music video ==
The song's music video features a man (Jay Kay) and his girlfriend (Heidi Klum) driving in a car and having a party in a garden of Jay Kay's mansion with other women. The garden is also featured in the video for "Seven Days in Sunny June" (2005). The car in the video was Jay Kay's own 1958 Bentley S1 Continental, which he had bought in January 2001. The car was shipped to Marbella, in southern Spain, for the video shoot.

== Track listings ==
UK CD single

1. "Love Foolosophy"
2. "Love Foolosophy" (Knee Deep re-edit)
3. "Love Foolosophy" (Twin club mix)
4. "Love Foolosophy" (video)

UK 12-inch single

A1. "Love Foolosophy" (Bini & Martini Ocean remix) – 8:27
B1. "Little L" (Blaze Shelter mix) – 7:43
B2. "Love Foolosophy" (Bini's Ocean dub) – 3:46

UK DVD single

1. "Love Foolosophy" (video)
2. "Picture of My Life" (Radio 1 acoustic session audio)
3. "Black Crow" (Radio 1 acoustic session audio)
4. "Little L" (video clip)
5. "You Give Me Something" (video clip)
6. "Alright" (video clip)
7. "Space Cowboy" (video clip)

Australian CD single

1. "Love Foolosophy"
2. "Love Foolosophy" (Bini & Martini Ocean remix)
3. "Love Foolosophy" (Knee Deep re-edit)
4. "Black Crow" (live)
5. "Picture of My Life" (live)

Japanese CD single

1. "Love Foolosophy" – 3:47
2. "Love Foolosophy" (Mondo Grosso Love Acoustic mix) – 4:42
3. "Love Foolosophy" (Knee Deep remix) – 8:29
4. "Little L" (Blaze remix) – 6:21
5. "Black Crow" (Radio 1 acoustic session) – 3:39
6. "Picture of My Life" (Radio 1 acoustic session) – 3:30

== Charts ==
Chart (2002)	Peak position
Australia (ARIA)	19
Belgium (Ultratip Bubbling Under Flanders)	9
Belgium (Ultratip Bubbling Under Wallonia)	4
Europe (Eurochart Hot 100)	55
Germany (GfK)	82
Ireland (IRMA)	35
Italy (FIMI)	14
Netherlands (Single Top 100)	85
Romania (Romanian Top 100)	59
Scottish Singles Sales (Official Charts)	12
Spain (Promusicae)	19
Switzerland (Schweizer Hitparade)	32
UK Singles (Official Charts)	14

== Certifications ==
Region	Certification	Certified units/sales
Mexico (AMPROFON)	Gold	30,000^{‡}
United Kingdom (BPI)	Silver	200,000^{‡}
^{‡} Sales+streaming figures based on certification alone.

== Release history ==
Region	Date	Format(s)	Label(s)	Ref.
United Kingdom	25 February 2002	CD	Sony Soho Square	
Japan	6 March 2002	CD	Epic	
Australia	25 March 2002	CD	Sony Soho Square; Columbia	
