= An Online Odyssey =

EP by Jamiroquai
- Released: 1 June 2001
- Recorded: 1999–2001
- Genre: Funk, R&B
- Length: 11:16
- Label: Sony Soho Square
- Producer: Jay Kay

Jamiroquai chronology
1999 Remixes (1999)	An Online Odyssey (2001)	A Funk Odyssey (2001)

An Online Odyssey is a promotional-only EP released by British funk/acid jazz band Jamiroquai, released exclusively on 1 June 2001 for the United Kingdom, for free, to promote the launch of A Funk Odyssey as well as the band's new website. Around 10,000 copies of the album were pressed, with most being distributed in Britain. British copies of the album also featured a membership postcard for the group's official fan club at the time, "A Club Odyssey".

== Track listing ==
1. "Black Capricorn Day" (White Knights Remix) – 7:38
2. "Snooze, You Lose" – 3:55
3. "Black Capricorn Day" (Video) – 3:42
