= The Temperance Movement (band) =

Blues rock band

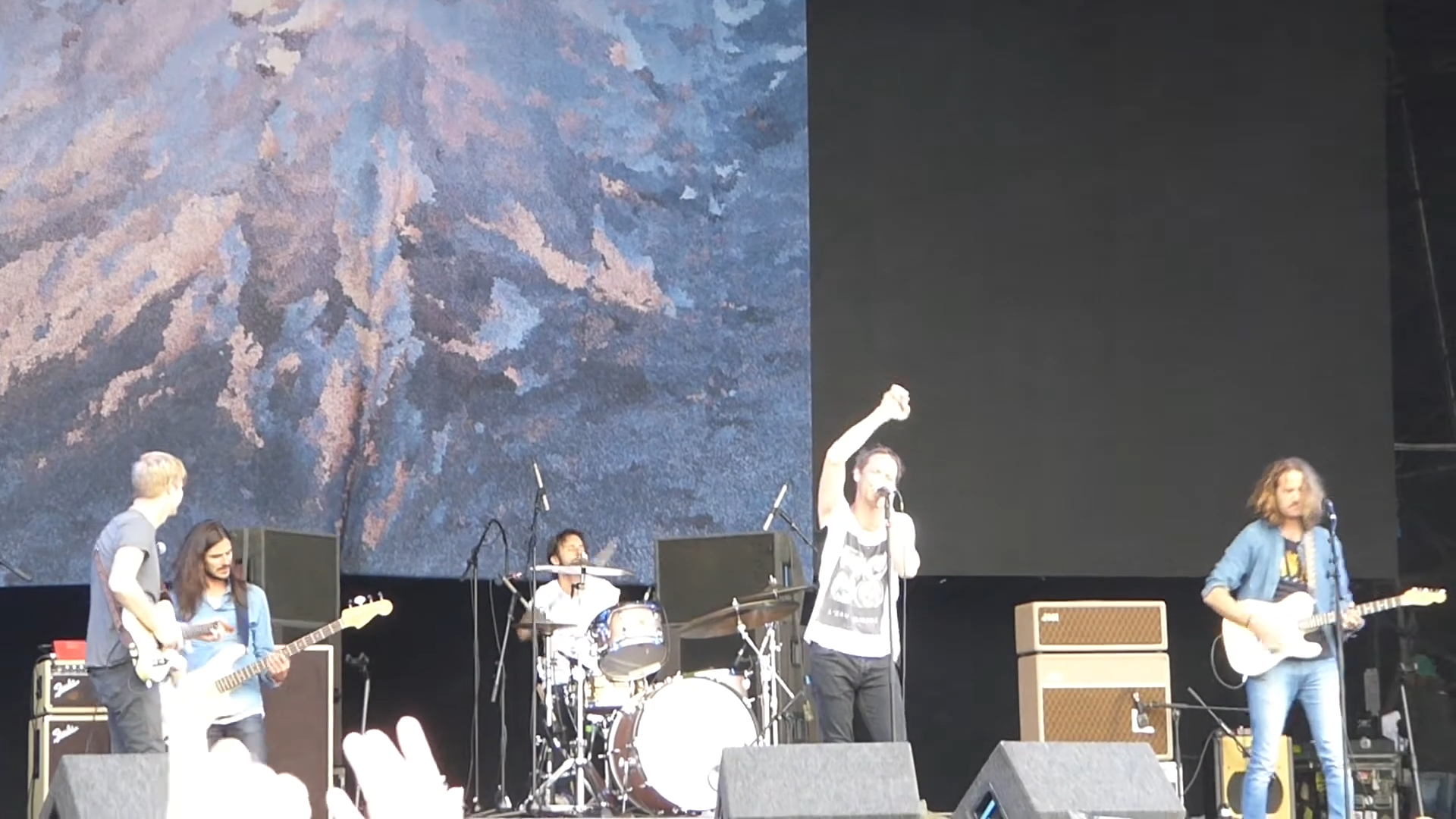
- The Temperance Movement in 2015

Background information
- Origin: Bishopbriggs, Scotland
- Genres: Blues rock, hard rock, Southern rock
- Years active: 2011–present
- Labels: Earache Records ex-US/Canada, Concord Music Group US/Canada
- Members: Phil Campbell; Luke Potashnick; Paul Sayer; Nick Fyffe; Simon Lea
- Past members: Damon Wilson; Matt White
- Website: Official website

The Temperance Movement are a British blues rock supergroup formed in 2011 by Glasgow-born vocalist Phil Campbell (formerly of the rock band White Buffalo) and guitarists Luke Potashnick and Paul Sayer. The rhythm section consists of bassist Nick Fyffe and drummer Simon Lea. The band released their Pride EP in 2012, and their eponymous debut studio album was released on 16 September 2013. Collectively the band have a rich history of experience, having previously played with Rooster, Ben's Brother, Jamiroquai, Ray Davies, The Waterboys and Feeder.

== History ==
The Temperance Movement's first release was their Pride EP, which came out on 10 September 2012, and featured five tracks: "Ain't No Telling", "Only Friend", "Pride", "Be Lucky" and "Lovers & Fighters". The following week, the band appeared at the 2012 edition of the Sunflower Jam SuperJam at the Royal Albert Hall, where, as the opening act, they played the first two tracks from their EP. The band also played at Futurerock at the 100 Club (Oxford Street, London) on 9 November 2012, and they embarked on a UK tour from late April to early May 2013. The band's debut studio album, The Temperance Movement, was released on 16 September 2013 on Earache Records. The album features the five tracks from the Pride EP alongside seven new songs, with an extra two songs included with purchases from the iTunes store ("Mother's Eyes" and "Already Know").

In June 2014, the Temperance Movement was the guest band before the Rolling Stones' concerts in Berlin (Waldbühne), Düsseldorf (Esprit Arena) and Vienna (Ernst Happel Stadion).

In 2015, the band toured with Blackberry Smoke in the United States on the Holding All the Roses Tour. In January 2015, it was announced by Planet Rock Radio that The Temperance Movement would be appearing at Planet Rockstock that June in Marrakech. On 26 September 2015, Luke Potashnick left the band to fully dedicate himself to a career as a songwriter/producer. A long time friend of the band, Matt White, joined as the replacement as the band finished work on their second album. On 15 January 2016, the band released White Bear. Produced by Sam Miller, the album was preceded by lead single "Three Bulleits" and reached #18 in the UK albums chart.

On 30 November 2016, it was announced that Damon Wilson had amicably left the band to spend more time with his wife and family.

In January 2020, frontman and principal songwriter Phil Campbell announced that he was leaving The Temperance Movement. Campbell would go on to form The Byson Family, who released an album called Kick The Traces in January 2021.

On 18 August 2021, it was announced that The Temperance Movement would be releasing Covers & Rarities via Earache Records - a collection of rare tracks and covers, including the unheard track "Long Run" and the unheard cover of Deep Purple's "You Fool No One" featuring Deep Purple's Ian Paice and recorded at London's Metropolis Studios. The album was released on 26 November 2021 and achieved #38 in the UK Album Chart, making it the band's fourth UK Top 40 album. It also placed at #2 in both the UK Rock Chart and the UK Independent Chart.

On 29 September 2021, a second compilation album, Caught On Stage: Live & Acoustic, was announced for release on 14 January 2022. Caught On Stage: Live & Acoustic was released on various formats via Earache Records, including limited edition colour vinyl, black vinyl, CD and digital formats.

On 2 December 2024 The Temperance Movement announced a UK and Europe Tour commencing 17 March 2025 with members Paul, Nick, Phil, Simon and Luke.

== Band members ==
Current members

- Phil Campbell – vocals (2011–2020, 2024–present)
- Luke Potashnick – guitars (2011–2015, 2024–present)
- Paul Sayer – guitars (2011–2020, 2024–present)
- Nick Fyffe – bass (2011–2020, 2024–present)
- Simon Lea – drums (2016–2020, 2024–present)

Former members

- Damon Wilson – drums (2011–2016)
- Matt White – guitars (2015–2020)

Timeline

== Discography ==
=== Studio albums ===
- The Temperance Movement (2013)
- White Bear (2016)
- A Deeper Cut (2018)
- New Promise Land Incorporated (2026)

=== Compilation albums ===
- Covers & Rarities (2021)
- Caught On Stage: Live & Acoustic (2022)

=== EPs ===
- Pride EP (2012)
- Live in Session (2013)
