= Laika Come Home =

2002 remix album by Spacemonkeyz vs Gorillaz

Remix album by Spacemonkeyz and Gorillaz
- Released: 1 July 2002
- Recorded: 2000–2002
- Genres: Dub; reggae
- Length: 75:44
- Labels: Parlophone/EMI (UK); Astralwerks/Caroline/Virgin/EMI Records (US)
- Producers: Spacemonkeyz; Gorillaz; Dan the Automator

Gorillaz chronology
G-Sides (2001)	Laika Come Home (2002)	Demon Days (2005)

Damon Albarn chronology
Mali Music (2002)	Laika Come Home (2002)	Think Tank (2003)

Singles from Laika Come Home
- 1. "Lil' Dub Chefin'" Released: 22 July 2002

Professional ratings
Review scores
Source	Rating
AllMusic	3/5 stars
Encyclopedia of Popular Music	3/5 stars
NME	7/10

Laika Come Home is a remix album by a British virtual band Gorillaz, released in July 2002. Unlike a typical remix album, it is done by just one group, Spacemonkeyz. It contains most of the songs from Gorillaz' first album, Gorillaz, but remixed in dub and reggae style. The album features Terry Hall, U Brown, Earl Sixteen and 2-D. One single, "Lil' Dub Chefin'", was released from the album on 22 July 2002, with moderate success. The limited edition was packed in digipak, featuring two hidden tracks. In 2004, the album was packaged with 2001's Gorillaz in a box set as part of EMI's "2CD Originals" collection. The album's title is a reference to Laika, the Soviet space dog, and the film Lassie Come Home. The album contains mixes of every song on the original album except "Double Bass", "Latin Simone (¿Que Pasa Contigo?)", and "Rock the House".

== Background ==
The Spacemonkeyz appear to be first referenced before the album in the "Tomorrow Comes Today" video. During the video, in the background, a poster can be seen with three pictures of monkeys with spacesuits and the caption "Laugh now but one day we'll be in charge". The artwork is a famous piece of artwork by Banksy, the visual artist who worked with Damon Albarn for Think Tank's artwork and Demon Days producer Danger Mouse in an attack against Paris Hilton. Before the release of the album, the remix of "Tomorrow Comes Today" ("Bañana Baby") was released on the "Tomorrow Comes Today" single in February 2002.

== Track listing ==
Laika Come Home – Standard edition
No.	Title	Gorillaz original	Length
1.	"Jungle Fresh"	"19-2000"	5:28
2.	"Strictly Rubbadub"	"Slow Country"	3:41
3.	"Bañana Baby"	"Tomorrow Comes Today"	5:29
4.	"Monkey Racket"	"Man Research (Clapper)"	5:57
5.	"De-Punked"	"Punk"	5:20
6.	"P.45"	"5/4"	4:26
7.	"Dub Ø9"	"Starshine"	5:17
8.	"Crooked Dub"	"Sound Check (Gravity)"	5:31
9.	"Mutant Genius"	"New Genious (Brother)"	5:02
10.	"Come Again"	"Re-Hash"	6:04
11.	"A Fistful of Peanuts"	"Clint Eastwood"	5:53
12.	"Lil' Dub Chefin'"	"M1 A1"	4:28
Total length:			62:36

Laika Come Home – Hidden tracks
No.	Title	Gorillaz original	Length
12.	"Lil' Dub Chefin'" (with interlude)	"M1 A1"	5:43
13.	"Strictly Rubbadub" ("More Rubbadub" Version)	"Slow Country"	5:14
14.	"A Fistful of Peanuts" ("More Peanuts" Version)	"Clint Eastwood"	6:39
Total length:			75:44

== Personnel ==
=== Musicians ===
- Damon Albarn – vocals (all tracks), piano (tracks 2–3), stylophone (track 2), melodica (tracks 3–4, 11), guitar (tracks 7–8, 10)
- Spacemonkeyz – instrumentation, programming, guitar, bass, drum programming
- Miho Hatori – additional vocals (tracks 1, 10)
- Tina Weymouth – additional vocals (track 1)
- Michael Smith – horn, horn arrangements (tracks 1–3, 5–6, 10–12), flute (track 11)
- Martin Shaw – horn (track 1)
- Dan Left Hand – bass (track 1)
- Jeff Scantlebury – percussion (tracks 1–3, 5–8, 10–12)
- Jaques Shythé – castanets (track 1)
- U Brown – vocals (tracks 2, 11)
- Dennis Rollins – horn (tracks 2–3, 5–6, 10–12)
- Dominic Glover – horn (tracks 2–3, 5–6, 10–12)
- Phil Soul – bass (tracks 2–4, 8, 10, 12)
- Earl Sixteen – vocals (tracks 3, 11)
- Stuart Zender – bass (tracks 3–4), clavinet (track 4)
- Pete Collins – incendiary device (track 5)
- Simon Katz – guitar (track 6), organ (track 12)
- Brian Pisce – strings (track 8)
- Terry Hall – vocals (track 12)

=== Technical ===
- Gorillaz – production
- Tom Girling – co-production, engineering, Pro Tools
- Jason Cox – co-production, engineering
- Dan Nakamura – production (tracks 1–6, 8–12)
- Spacemonkeyz – additional production, re-mixing
- Pete Collins – assistance

=== Artwork ===
- J.C. Hewlett – illustration
- Mat Wakeham – art direction
- Kate McLauchlan – design
- Roland Hamilton – monkey photos

== Charts ==
Chart (2002)	Peak position
French Albums (SNEP)	118
UK Albums (OCC)	108
US Billboard 200	156
US Top Dance Albums (Billboard)	6

== Release details ==
The album was released in various countries in July 2002.

Country	Date	Label	Format	Catalogue
United Kingdom	1 July 2002	Parlophone	CD	540 3622
United Kingdom	1 July 2002	Parlophone	2×LP	539 9821
Japan	3 July 2002	Toshiba-EMI	CD	TOCP-66045
United States	16 July 2002	Astralwerks	CD	ASW 40362
United States	16 July 2002	Astralwerks	CD digipak	ASW 40522
