= Feels Just Like It Should (Jamiroquai song) =

2005 single by Jamiroquai

Single by Jamiroquai

from the album Dynamite
- B-side: "Feels So Good" (remix)
- Released: 6 June 2005
- Genre: Funk; funk rock
- Length: 4:34
- Label: Sony BMG; Epic
- Songwriters: Jay Kay; Sola Akingbola; Rob Harris; Matt Johnson; Derrick McKenzie
- Producers: Mike Spencer; Jay Kay

Jamiroquai singles chronology
| "Corner of the Earth" (2002) | "Feels Just Like It Should" (2005) | "Seven Days in Sunny June" (2005) |

Music video
- "Feels Just Like It Should" on YouTube

"Feels Just Like It Should" is the first single from British funk and acid jazz band Jamiroquai's sixth studio album, Dynamite (2005). Mike Spencer and Jay Kay produced the song. The track was built on a bass line created by Kay while beatboxing. This bassline initially formed part of an interlude intended to feature on the band's 2001 album, A Funk Odyssey. Still, it was dropped for the album's final version, only appearing on the test pressing. The song was their fourth number-one on the US Dance Chart and peaked at eight on the UK Singles Chart. It was nominated for a Grammy Award for Best Short Form Music Video at the 48th Grammy Awards.

== Music video ==
Directed by Joseph Kahn, and filmed in the Skid Row neighborhood of Los Angeles. The video shows a nerd (played by Jay Kay) entering an elevator. The elevator takes him to a strange area (the number bar reads "hell"), where the nerd turns into Jay Kay. He walks down a street and into an alley, where he meets a pimp (also played by Kay), who is the "candyman" mentioned in the lyrics. He plays several mind tricks on Kay. Kay's reactions almost precisely fit in with the lyrics; for example, with the line I'm throwing out my laser beams, he shoots lasers at a laser-shooting woman, and with I pick a little free agent, he picks up a dwarf secret agent (Jason Acuña) who shoots the woman but gets thrown away. As the video progresses, Kay rides down the street on a skateboard and sees the candyman (a pimp) driving the car, with a prostitute wearing a red dress as a passenger. He goes into a phone booth and presumably calls his wife or someone else. Then he transforms back into the nerd, who enters a room with the prostitute, and she tries having sex with him. The prostitute is then revealed to be Kay dressed up for a brief moment. The nerd however is abruptly kicked out of the building by another pimp. The video ends with the nerd lying in an alley, in the pouring rain, crying.

== Track listings ==
UK CD1

1. "Feels Just Like It Should" – 4:34
2. "Feels So Good" (Knee Deep Remix) – 3:44

UK CD2

1. "Feels Just Like It Should" – 4:34
2. "Feels Just Like It Should" (Mark Ronson Remix) – 3:49
3. "Feels Just Like It Should" (Timo Maas Remix) – 9:31

== Charts ==
=== Weekly charts ===
| Chart (2005) | Peak position |
|---|---|
| Australia (ARIA) | 27 |
| Austria (Ö3 Austria Top 40) | 71 |
| Belgium (Ultratip Bubbling Under Flanders) | 4 |
| Belgium (Ultratip Bubbling Under Wallonia) | 5 |
| Finland (Suomen virallinen lista) | 19 |
| Germany (GfK) | 69 |
| Ireland (IRMA) | 29 |
| Italy (FIMI) | 8 |
| Netherlands (Dutch Top 40 Tipparade) | 9 |
| Netherlands (Single Top 100) | 88 |
| Scotland Singles (OCC) | 10 |
| Spain (Promusicae) | 6 |
| Sweden (Sverigetopplistan) | 60 |
| Switzerland (Schweizer Hitparade) | 33 |
| UK Singles (OCC) | 8 |
| UK Hip Hop/R&B (OCC) | 1 |
| US Dance Club Songs (Billboard) | 1 |

=== Year-end charts ===
| Chart (2005) | Position |
|---|---|
| UK Singles (OCC) | 153 |
| US Dance Club Play (Billboard) | 45 |

== Release history ==
| Region | Date | Format(s) | Label(s) | Ref. |
|---|---|---|---|---|
| Australia | 6 June 2005 | CD | Sony BMG | |
| Denmark | 6 June 2005 | CD | Sony BMG | |
| United Kingdom | 6 June 2005 | CD | Sony BMG | |

== See also ==
- List of number-one dance singles of 2005 (U.S.)
