= (Don't) Give Hate a Chance =

2005 single by Jamiroquai

Single by Jamiroquai

from the album Dynamite
- Released: 7 November 2005
- Length: 5:03 (album version); 3:46 (video version)
- Label: Sony BMG
- Songwriter(s): Jason Kay; Robert Harris; Matthew Johnson; Sola Akingbola; Derek McKenzie
- Producer(s): Jason Kay; Mike Spencer

Jamiroquai singles chronology
"Seven Days in Sunny June" (2005)	"(Don't) Give Hate a Chance" (2005)	"Hollywood Swinging" (2005)

Music video
- "(Don't) Give Hate a Chance" on YouTube

"(Don't) Give Hate A Chance" is the third and final single from British funk and acid jazz band Jamiroquai's sixth studio album, Dynamite (2005). The title is a reference to the song "Give Peace a Chance" by John Lennon, and was written by Jason Kay, Rob Harris and Matt Johnson. It was produced by Kay and Mike Spencer. The single was released on 7 November 2005, peaking on the UK Singles Chart at number 27.

== Music video ==
The animated Jay Kay in the video.

The video for "(Don't) Give Hate a Chance" is Jamiroquai's only computer-animated music video and pays homage to the Italian cartoon La Linea. In the video, an animated version of Jay Kay himself (resembling Mr. Linea from the aforementioned show) sings and dances as it cuts to scenes with humanoids (who also resemble the same character) make war references. It also feature the hand from said show and even animated gorillas.

To promote the release of the video, Sony BMG organised the video to be projected on a number of outdoor venues around central London, including the walls of the Chelsea Barracks military grounds and a car park in the Soho district. An alternate video released in late October, which included the ground being replaced by plants and rocks and significant changes to the final minute of the video.

== Track listing ==
UK CD1

1. "(Don't) Give Hate A Chance" – 3:50
2. "(Don't) Give Hate A Chance" (Steve Mac Classic Mix) – 5:04
3. "(Don't) Give Hate A Chance" (Freemasons Remix) - 9:56
4. "(Don't) Give Hate A Chance" (Freemasons Radio Edit) - 4:07
5. "(Don't) Give Hate A Chance" (Freemasons Dub Mix) - 7:34
6. "(Don't) Give Hate A Chance" (Steve Mac Dub Mix) - 9:10

== Charts ==
Chart (2006)	Peak position
Hungary (Rádiós Top 40)	34
