= A Deeper Cut =

Studio album by the Temperance Movement
- Released: 16 February 2018
- Studio: Monnow Valley Studios
- Genres: Blues rock, hard rock
- Length: 43:17
- Label: Earache
- Producers: Sam Miller and The Temperance Movement

The Temperance Movement chronology
White Bear (2016)	A Deeper Cut (2018)	Covers & Rarities (2021)

A Deeper Cut is the third studio album by British rock band the Temperance Movement.

== Track listing ==
No.	Title	Length
1.	"Caught in the Middle"	2:40
2.	"Built-In Forgetter"	4:21
3.	"Love and Devotion"	3:23
4.	"A Deeper Cut"	3:44
5.	"Backwater Zoo"	3:54
6.	"Another Spiral"	3:28
7.	"Beast Nation"	3:23
8.	"The Way It Was and the Way It Is Now"	3:17
9.	"Higher Than the Sun"	3:21
10.	"Children"	4:08
11.	"There's Still Time"	3:31
12.	"The Wonders We've Seen"	4:00

== Personnel ==
The Temperance Movement

- Phil Campbell – vocals
- Paul Sayer – guitars
- Nick Fyffe – bass
- Matt White – guitars
- Simon Lea – drums

Production

- The Temperance Movement — production
- Sam Miller — production, recording, mixing
- Geoff Pesche — mastering

Design

- Stewart Chown — design & layout

== Charts ==
Chart (2018)	Peak position
Austrian Albums (Ö3 Austria)	43
German Albums (Offizielle Top 100)	44
Scottish Albums (Official Charts)	2
Swiss Albums (Schweizer Hitparade)	34
UK Albums (Official Charts)	6
UK Rock & Metal Albums (Official Charts)	1
