= Synkronized =

Studio album by Jamiroquai
- Released: 8 June 1999
- Recorded: 1998–1999
- Studios: Chillington (Buckinghamshire, England)
- Genres: Funk; soul; R&B; disco; acid jazz
- Length: 53:06
- Label: Sony Soho Square
- Producers: Al Stone; Jason Kay

Jamiroquai chronology
In-Store Jam (1997)	Synkronized (1999)	1999 Remixes (1999)

Jamiroquai studio album chronology
Travelling Without Moving (1996)	Synkronized (1999)	A Funk Odyssey (2001)

Singles from Synkronized
- 1. "Canned Heat" Released: 24 May 1999; 2. "Supersonic" Released: 13 September 1999; 3. "Black Capricorn Day" Released: 3 November 1999 (Japan only); 4. "King for a Day" Released: 29 November 1999

Synkronized is the fourth studio album by English funk and acid jazz band Jamiroquai. It was released on 8 June 1999 by Work Group in the United States, and on 14 June 1999 by S2 Records in the United Kingdom. Bassist Stuart Zender left the band during recording, and Nick Fyffe was hired as a replacement. The album contains funk, acid jazz and disco elements.

The album reached number one in the UK Albums Chart and number 28 in the US Billboard 200. The UK version of the album includes the bonus track "Deeper Underground", which was released as a single the previous year and became Jamiroquai's only number-one single in the UK.

== Background ==
The album's recording sessions began at Jay Kay's Buckinghamshire home studio, Chillington, in 1998. About nine tracks were recorded, but the band's bassist, Stuart Zender, left partway through the recording in late 1998. Jay Kay hired a replacement, Nick Fyffe, who was originally looking to audition for a Jamiroquai tribute band, and the album was re-recorded. The revised album was finished and released within six months. Synkronized is the band's last album to feature didgeridoo player Wallis Buchanan. Kay said that he was dissatisfied with Synkronized in a 2001 interview, "I never really locked into that album, lyrically. I wasn't there. I listen to it now, and I shake my head."

== Composition ==
The opening track, "Canned Heat", has "svelte Chic Organisation strings, a percolating bassline and a stomping four-on-the-floor rhythm". The second track, "Planet Home", is a "straight, bass-driven funk" track that has techno influences from "ghostly ambient harmonies to bone-shaking synth bass," and an "out-of-nowhere Latin hustle breakdown". The next track, "Black Capricorn Day", has a "driving funk groove with sassy horn interjections" which tend to "stutte[r] like a record on a turntable", with its lyrics about being depressed. The lyrics of the fourth track "Soul Education" is about having an "instinctive understanding of universal truths", as Kay confirmed in an interview with Muzik, "A soul education is what we're all born with, and the [song's] lyrics say, 'Life information – it's on the breeze.'"

"Falling" is a "bass driven" acid-jazz ballad track with its lyrics dedicated to Kay's then-girlfriend Denise Van Outen, which is followed by "Destitute Illusions", an instrumental track "swamped in layer upon layer of antique analogue synthesizers", and has the "scratching of DJ D-Zire". The seventh track, "Supersonic", has a "didgeridoo and dobro drone against electronic percussion and a squiggling synth bass, all of which builds to an hallucinogenic mid-song samba break." The "breezy" track "Butterfly" has "a wobbly bassline that rises up and swamps the chorus." The "multirhythmic" track "Where Do We Go From Here", has an "energetic progression broken by catchy and uplifting choruses with staccato interplay between the horn section and guitarist Simon Katz". The album closes with "King for a Day", which has "dramatic piano and sympathetic strings", and lyrics referencing Zender's departure.

== Release ==
Synkronized was first released on 8 June 1999 on the Work Group label in the United States, then on 14 June in the United Kingdom on Sony Soho Square. The album reached number 28 in the US Billboard 200, where it sold 310,000 shipments. The album peaked at number 2 in the UK chart. In Japan, it reached number 2, and in the year end charts there it ranked number 32 in 1999. It peaked at number 2 in the French SNEP Album charts and number 30 in the year end chart in 1999. In Switzerland, it reached number 2 in the Swiss Albums Charts, and number 25 in the year end chart in 1999. It ranked number 1 in the German Media Control Albums Chart, and it ranked at number 23 in the German year end charts. In Belgium, it ranked 4 in the Ultratop Flanders chart and number 6 in the Wallonia chart. In their year end charts, the album ranked at 42 and 36 respectively. In the Netherlands, in peaked at 6 in the album chart, and number 50 in the year end chart in 1999. In the Australian ARIA Albums chart, it ranked at 1 and 63 at the end of the year. The album was certified platinum in the UK, Switzerland and France. In Japan, it had a quadruple platinum certification. The album was certified gold in Germany, Belgium, the Netherlands, and Australia. It was Platinum in Europe by the IFPI denoting sales of 1,000,000 copies. The album overall sold 3,000,000 copies worldwide.

"Canned Heat" was released as the album's lead single on 24 May 1999 and was the group's second number one on the US Billboard Dance Club Songs Chart. It also ranked at number 4 in the UK. "Supersonic", released 13 September 1999, is the group's third US Dance Club number 1, also ranking at number 22 in the UK. "Black Capricorn Day" was released only in Japan on 3 November 1999. "King for a Day" is the last song to be released on 29 November 1999, where it peaked at number 20 in the UK.

== Reception ==
Professional ratings
Review scores
Source	Rating
AllMusic	4/5 stars
Encyclopedia of Popular Music	4/5 stars
Entertainment Weekly	B−
The Guardian	3/5 stars
Los Angeles Times	3/4 stars
NME	6/10
Q	4/5 stars
Rolling Stone	3/5 stars
Spin	6/10
The Village Voice	C−

The album received positive reviews from critics. According to John Bush of AllMusic: "Kay [continues his] fascination with club-bound music of the 1970s -- from disco to jazz-funk to rare groove to later Motown -- but also shows signs of maturity." Tony Farsides of The Guardian remarked that Synkronized's "hard and nervy uptempo disco feel reflects the frantic atmosphere surrounding its creation." Farsides called it "Jamiroquai's best record to date. It is more consistent than its three predecessors. Both critics have noted the band's new use of electronic textures. Rolling Stone gave the album three out of five stars, claiming "Synkronized is fifty minutes of sleek, sexy fun; a party album delivered with something like conviction. It's not exactly irresistible, but, really, what's the point of resisting it?" Spin gave the album the same rating, claiming "...redirects the band's British tendency toward smoothed-out old black jams....soaring strings, gyrating congas, hell-bent wah-wah's, and an undeniably live rhythm section that'll hustle your muscles and make you freak to the beat..." Entertainment Weekly claimed: "Imagine if [Stevie] Wonder had made a disco album in 1977!....Synkronized is a hat trick done with the sharpest chapeau in the store." College Music Journal claimed: "This incessantly upbeat expedition travels into the regions of Travolta-era disco...feverish funk...and instrumental iridescence...keeping your ears tuned to their funktastic audio adventures." Troy Carpenter of Nude as the News called the track "King for a Day", "the band's best-ever album closer". Q magazine claimed the album was one of the "50 Best Albums of 1999".

David Kendrick of Hartford Courant wrote that "Kay and Co. walk a tightrope between homage and derivation. They stay aloft with songs that are light and breezy", and that its lyrics "hold a carefree optimism". Prasad Bidaye of Exclaim! called the album, "Jamiroquai's most sophisticated production... The songs don't come anywhere close to the smooth balance of funk and environmentalism in their earlier material, but their philosophy of pre-millennial escapism makes this one of the most energetic recordings Jamiroquai has released in years." Edna Gundersen of USA Today wrote that "while the band's fourth album does boast a few jamming grooves, especially the brassy Black Capricorn Day, most of the tracks are to funk what Pop Tarts are to soul food." Writing for Las Vegas Review-Journal, Tom Moon wrote that "the liquid, slippery grooves are paramount, though they're sometimes buried under mountains of strings and arrangements that are a tad too busy." He also said that "Canned Heat" and several other tracks are "thinly veiled rewrites of 'Virtual Insanity' and the other radio songs from Traveling Without Moving." In his consumer guide for The Village Voice, critic Robert Christgau gave the album a C− rating in his annual "Turkey Shoot", indicating "a bad record of some general import".

== Track listing ==
All tracks are written by Jay Kay and Toby Smith, except where noted.

No.	Title	Writer(s)	Length
1.	"Canned Heat"	Kay	5:31
2.	"Planet Home"		4:44
3.	"Black Capricorn Day"	Kay	5:41
4.	"Soul Education"		4:15
5.	"Falling"		3:45
6.	"Destitute Illusions"	Kay; Smith; Derrick McKenzie	5:40
7.	"Supersonic"		5:15
8.	"Butterfly"		4:28
9.	"Where Do We Go from Here?"	Kay	5:13
10.	"King for a Day"		3:40
Total length:			48:12

UK bonus track
No.	Title	Length
11.	"Deeper Underground"	4:46

Japanese bonus track
No.	Title	Writer(s)	Length
11.	"Getinfunky" (instrumental)	Kay; Wallis Buchanan	5:35

Australian bonus disc
No.	Title	Writer(s)	Length
1.	"Deeper Underground"		4:46
2.	"Getinfunky" (instrumental)	Kay; Buchanan	5:35
3.	"Wolf in Sheep's Clothing" (instrumental)	Kay; Buchanan	4:00
Total length:			14:21

== Personnel ==
Credits for Synkronized adapted from album liner notes.

Jamiroquai

- Jay Kay – vocals, arrangements, string arrangements, producer, artwork concept
- Toby Smith – keyboards, keyboard programming (tracks 1–9)
- Derrick McKenzie – drums
- Nick Fyffe – bass
- Simon Katz – guitar (except track 1)
- Sola Akingbola – percussion
- Wallis Buchanan – didgeridoo
- DJ D-Zire – turntables

Additional musicians

- Erwin Keiles – guitar (track 1)
- John Thirkell – trumpet, flugel
- Katie Kissoon & Beverley Skeet – backing vocals
- Kick Horns – horns
- Simon Hale – string arrangements, keyboard programming (track 10)

Production

- Al Stone – producer, recording, mixing
- Paul Stoney – assistant engineering
- Mike Marsh – mastering
- David Malone – artwork concept
- Midori Tsukagoshi – photography

== Charts ==
=== Weekly charts ===
Chart	Position
Australian Albums (ARIA)	1
Austrian Albums (Ö3 Austria)	2
Belgian Albums (Ultratop Flanders)	4
Belgian Albums (Ultratop Wallonia)	6
Canada Top Albums/CDs (RPM)	8
Dutch Albums (Album Top 100)	6
European Albums Chart	1
Finnish Albums (Suomen virallinen lista)	4
French Albums (SNEP)	2
German Albums (Offizielle Top 100)	1
Hungarian Albums (MAHASZ)	6
Japanese Oricon Albums Chart	2
New Zealand Albums (RMNZ)	12
Norwegian Albums (VG-lista)	8
Swedish Albums (Sverigetopplistan)	9
Swiss Albums (Schweizer Hitparade)	2
UK Albums (Official Charts)	1
US Billboard 200	28

=== Year-end charts ===
Chart (1999)	Position
Australian Albums Chart	63
Austrian Albums Chart	42
Belgian Albums Chart (Flanders)	42
Belgian Albums Chart (Wallonia)	36
Dutch Albums Chart	50
French Albums Chart	30
German Albums Chart	23
Japanese Albums Chart	32
Swiss Albums Chart	25

== Certifications and sales ==
Region	Certification	Certified units/sales
Australia (ARIA)	Gold	35,000^{^}
Belgium (BRMA)	Gold	25,000^{*}
Canada (Music Canada)	Gold	50,000^{^}
France (SNEP)	Platinum	300,000^{*}
Germany (BVMI)	Gold	250,000^{^}
Japan (RIAJ)	4× Platinum	800,000^{^}
Netherlands (NVPI)	Gold	50,000^{^}
New Zealand (RMNZ)	Gold	7,500^{^}
Spain (Promusicae)	Gold	50,000^{^}
Switzerland (IFPI Switzerland)	Platinum	50,000^{^}
United Kingdom (BPI)	Platinum	300,000^{^}
United States	—	310,000
Summaries
Europe (IFPI)	Platinum	1,000,000^{*}
Worldwide	—	3,000,000
^{*} Sales figures based on certification alone.^{^} Shipments figures based on certification alone.
