= A Funk Odyssey =

Studio album by Jamiroquai
- Released: 29 August 2001
- Studios: Chillington (Buckinghamshire, England)
- Genre: Nu-disco
- Length: 48:17
- Label: Sony Soho Square
- Producer: Rick Pope

Jamiroquai chronology
| An Online Odyssey (2001) | A Funk Odyssey (2001) | Late Night Tales: Jamiroquai (2003) |

Jamiroquai studio album chronology
| Synkronized (1999) | A Funk Odyssey (2001) | Dynamite (2005) |

Singles from A Funk Odyssey
- 1. "Little L" Released: 8 August 2001; 2. "You Give Me Something" Released: 12 November 2001; 3. "Feel So Good" Released: January 13, 2002; 4. "Love Foolosophy" Released: 25 February 2002; 5. "Corner of the Earth" Released: 8 July 2002

A Funk Odyssey is the fifth studio album by English funk band Jamiroquai. The album was released on 29 August 2001 in Japan, 3 September 2001 in the United Kingdom by Sony Soho Square and 11 September 2001 by Epic Records in the United States.

== Background ==
Combining elements of funk, disco and electronica, the release of the album represented the peak of international commercial success for Jamiroquai, and in the ensuing world tour the group became a household name in many countries. The sleeve art of A Funk Odyssey is the first Jamiroquai album not to prominently feature the "buffalo man" logo on its cover.

In a 2001 interview with Billboard magazine, Kay said he wrote the deliberately simple first single "Little L" in 25 minutes, "It would have been so easy to overthink and overwrite that song, because it's so incredibly simple. But that would've killed it." He described the fourth single, "Corner of the Earth", as a "spiritual song" that "speaks for anyone who's in a place or a moment where they're happy." For the tenth track, "Picture of My Life", Kay said, "I cried throughout the process of writing [the song]. It was an act of looking at some major personal issues and understanding their lingering effects."

== Reception ==
Professional ratings
Aggregate scores
| Source | Rating |
|---|---|
| Metacritic | 58/100 |
Review scores
| Source | Rating |
| AllMusic | 4/5 stars |
| Encyclopedia of Popular Music | 3/5 stars |
| Entertainment Weekly | B |
| The Guardian | 3/5 stars |
| The Indianapolis Star | 3/4 stars |
| New Musical Express | 2.5/5 stars |
| Q | 4/5 stars |
| Request Magazine | 74/100 |
| Slant Magazine | 3/5 stars |
| Us Weekly | 3.5/5 stars |
| Vibe | 2.5/5 stars |

Initial critical response to A Funk Odyssey was generally mixed to positive. At Metacritic, which assigns a normalised rating out of 100 to reviews from mainstream critics, the album has received an average score of 58, based on 13 reviews. Q magazine gave the album 4 out of 5 stars, claiming "A certified thoroughbred. This time, there's a bankable chorus or barbed sentiment for every mirror-ball moment....demonstrating that no-one does sci-fi boogie quite as well as he does sci-fi boogie." They also listed it as one of the best 50 albums of 2001. CMJ described the album as "The perfect mixtape to snap your fingers to on your way to another universe." A.D. Amorosi of The Indianapolis Star wrote that "'Corner of the Earth', with its swirling strings and sunlit happiness, may be Kay's finest moment, matching organic ambience with pure emotion." Tom Moon said that the album recalls the band's interest in "the swooping strings and thumping beats" from Earth Wind & Fire and later disco music, but concludes that "Kay never merely appropriates those devices... he goes back to the future, by Juxtaposing old-school guitars against sizzling house beats."

== Track listing ==
| No. | Title | Writer(s) | Length |
|---|---|---|---|
| 1. | "Feel So Good" | Jay Kay; Toby Smith | 5:21 |
| 2. | "Little L" | Kay; Smith | 4:55 |
| 3. | "You Give Me Something" | Kay; Rob Harris; Nick Fyffe | 3:23 |
| 4. | "Corner of the Earth" | Kay; Harris | 5:40 |
| 5. | "Love Foolosophy" | Kay; Smith | 3:45 |
| 6. | "Stop Don't Panic" | Kay; Harris; Fyffe | 4:34 |
| 7. | "Black Crow" | Kay; Harris; Fyffe | 4:02 |
| 8. | "Main Vein" | Kay | 5:05 |
| 9. | "Twenty Zero One" | Kay | 5:15 |
| 10. | "Picture of My Life: So Good to Feel Real (Note: The song "Picture of My Life" ends at 3:45. After 30 seconds of silence (3:45–4:15), begins the hidden song "So Good to Feel Real".)" | Kay, Harris, Smith | 6:20 |
| Total length: | | | 48:15 |

Japanese edition bonus tracks
| No. | Title | Writer(s) | Length |
|---|---|---|---|
| 11. | "Do It Like We Used to Do" | | 7:32 |
| 12. | "Deeper Underground" | Kay; Smith | 4:44 |

Australian bonus disc
| No. | Title | Length |
|---|---|---|
| 1. | "Do It Like We Used to Do" | 7:32 |
| 2. | "Everybody's Going to the Moon" | 5:22 |
| 3. | "Little L" (Music video) |

Australian tour edition bonus disc
| No. | Title | Writer(s) | Length |
|---|---|---|---|
| 1. | "Space Cowboy" (Classic Club Mix) | | 7:52 |
| 2. | "Supersonic" (Dirty Rotten Scoundrels Vocal) | Kay, Smith | 7:00 |
| 3. | "Deeper Underground" | Kay; Smith | 4:43 |
| 4. | "Little L" (Bob Sinclair Remix) | Kay; Smith | 7:28 |
| 5. | "You Give Me Something" (Full Intention Remix) | Kay; Harris; Fyffe | 3:03 |
| 6. | "Main Vein" (live) | Kay | 5:14 |

Asian tour edition bonus disc
| No. | Title | Writer(s) | Length |
|---|---|---|---|
| 1. | "Everybody's Going to the Moon" | | 5:22 |
| 2. | "Do It Like We Used to Do" | | 7:32 |
| 3. | "Deeper Underground" | Kay; Smith | 4:44 |
| 4. | "Little L" (Bob Sinclair Remix) | Kay; Smith | 7:28 |
| 5. | "You Give Me Something" (Full Intention Remix) | Kay; Harris; Fyffe | 3:03 |
| 6. | "Main Vein" (live) | Kay | 5:14 |

South African tour edition bonus disc
| No. | Title | Writer(s) | Length |
|---|---|---|---|
| 1. | "Main Vein" (live) | | 5:14 |
| 2. | "Do It Like We Used to Do" | | 7:32 |
| 4. | "You Give Me Something" (Full Intention Remix) | Kay; Harris; Fyffe | 3:03 |
| 5. | "Little L" (Blaze Remix) | Kay; Smith | 5:55 |
| 6. | "Love Foolosophy" (Mondo Grosso Love Acoustic Version) | Kay; Smith | 4:44 |
| 7. | "Corner of the Earth" (Milk & Sugar Short Club Mix) | Kay; Harris | 4:13 |

French tour edition bonus disc
| No. | Title | Writer(s) | Length |
|---|---|---|---|
| 1. | "Everybody's Going to the Moon" | | 5:22 |
| 2. | "Do It Like We Used To Do" | | 7:32 |
| 3. | "Main Vein" (live) | Kay | 5:14 |
| 4. | "Titan" (Live at Telewest Arena) | | 3:15 |
| 5. | "Feels So Good" (Knee Deep Vocal Dub) | Kay; Harris; Fyffe | 7:34 |
| 6. | "Love Foolosophy" (Mondo Grosso Love Acoustic Version) | Kay; Smith | 4:44 |

Original test pressing
| No. | Title | Writer(s) | Length |
|---|---|---|---|
| 1. | "Feel So Good" (uncut) | Kay; Smith | 6:24 |
| 2. | "Little L" (extra percussion) | Kay; Smith | 4:55 |
| 3. | "You Give Me Something" (uncut) | Kay; Harris; Fyffe | 5:16 |
| 4. | "interlude #1" | | 0:35 |
| 5. | "Main Vein" (no vocal cut) | Kay | 4:51 |
| 6. | "Corner of the Earth" (vocal variation) | Kay; Harris | 5:40 |
| 7. | "Twenty Zero One" (uncut) | Kay | 8:29 |
| 8. | "Black Crow" (vocal variation) | Kay; Harris; Fyffe | 4:02 |
| 9. | "interlude#2" | | 1:22 |
| 10. | "Do It Like We Used To Do" (edited) | | 6:49 |
| 11. | "Stop Don't Panic" (uncut) | Kay; Harris; Fyffe | 5:31 |
| 12. | "interlude#3" | | 0:20 |
| 13. | "Picture of My Life" | Kay; Harris; Smith | 3:46 |
| 14. | "So Good to Feel Real" | Kay; Harris; Smith | 2:14 |

== Personnel ==
=== Jamiroquai ===
- Jay Kay – vocals
- Rob Harris – guitar
- Toby Smith – keyboards
- Nick Fyffe – bass
- Sola Akingbola – percussion
- Derrick McKenzie – drums

=== Additional personnel ===
- Beverley Knight – guest vocals on "Love Foolosophy" and "Main Vein"
- Dee Lewis – backing vocals
- Simon Hale – string arrangements
- John Thirkell – trumpet, flugel and horn arrangements
- Paul Stoney – programming

== Charts ==
=== Weekly charts ===
| Chart (2001) | Peak position |
|---|---|
| Australian Albums (ARIA) | 1 |
| Austrian Albums (Ö3 Austria) | 4 |
| Belgian Albums (Ultratop Flanders) | 6 |
| Belgian Albums (Ultratop Wallonia) | 3 |
| Canadian Albums (Billboard) | 5 |
| Danish Albums (Hitlisten) | 9 |
| Dutch Albums (Album Top 100) | 4 |
| Finnish Albums (Suomen virallinen lista) | 4 |
| French Albums (SNEP) | 1 |
| German Albums (Offizielle Top 100) | 2 |
| Hungarian Albums (MAHASZ) | 9 |
| Irish Albums (IRMA) | 3 |
| Italian Albums (FIMI) | 1 |
| Japanese Albums (Oricon) | 2 |
| New Zealand Albums (RMNZ) | 17 |
| Norwegian Albums (VG-lista) | 12 |
| Scottish Albums (Official Charts) | 1 |
| Spanish Albums (PROMUSICAE) | 3 |
| Swedish Albums (Sverigetopplistan) | 13 |
| Swiss Albums (Schweizer Hitparade) | 1 |
| UK Albums (Official Charts) | 1 |
| UK R&B Albums (Official Charts) | 6 |
| US Billboard 200 | 44 |

=== Year-end charts ===
| Chart (2001) | Position |
|---|---|
| Australian Albums (ARIA) | 40 |
| Belgian Albums (Ultratop Flanders) | 88 |
| Belgian Albums (Ultratop Wallonia) | 87 |
| Canadian Albums (Nielsen SoundScan) | 154 |
| Dutch Albums (Album Top 100) | 77 |
| French Albums (SNEP) | 47 |
| German Albums (Offizielle Top 100) | 51 |
| Italian Albums (FIMI) | 22 |
| Japanese Albums (Oricon) | 90 |
| Swiss Albums (Schweizer Hitparade) | 24 |
| UK Albums (OCC) | 28 |
| Worldwide Albums (IFPI) | 42 |
| Chart (2002) | Position |
| Australian Albums (ARIA) | 6 |
| UK Albums (OCC) | 50 |

=== Decade-end chart ===
| Chart (2000–2009) | Position |
|---|---|
| Australian Albums (ARIA) | 56 |

== Certifications and sales ==
| Region | Certification | Certified units/sales |
|---|---|---|
| Australia (ARIA) | 4× Platinum | 280,000^{^} |
| Belgium (BRMA) | Gold | 25,000^{*} |
| France (SNEP) | 2× Gold | 200,000^{*} |
| Italy (FIMI) | Platinum | 100,000^{*} |
| Japan (RIAJ) | Platinum | 255,000 |
| Netherlands (NVPI) | Gold | 40,000^{^} |
| Spain (Promusicae) | Gold | 50,000^{^} |
| Switzerland (IFPI Switzerland) | Platinum | 40,000^{^} |
| United Kingdom (BPI) | 2× Platinum | 871,000 |
| United States | — | 186,000 |
Summaries
| Europe (IFPI) | Platinum | 1,000,000^{*} |
^{*} Sales figures based on certification alone.^{^} Shipments figures based on certification alone.
