= Corner of the Earth =

2002 single by Jamiroquai

Single by Jamiroquai

from the album A Funk Odyssey
- B-side: "Main Vein" (remix); "Bad Girls" (live); "Titan" (live)
- Released: 8 July 2002
- Length: 5:40 (album version); 3:56 (radio edit)
- Label: Sony Soho Square
- Songwriters: Jay Kay; Rob Harris
- Producer: Rick Pope

Jamiroquai singles chronology
"Love Foolosophy" (2002)	"Corner of the Earth" (2002)	"Feels Just Like It Should" (2005)

Music video
- "Corner of the Earth" on YouTube

"Corner of the Earth" is the fourth and final single from British funk and acid jazz band Jamiroquai's fifth studio album, A Funk Odyssey (2001). Written by Jason Kay and Rob Harris, the song was released on 8 July 2002 and peaked at number 31 on the UK Singles Chart. It was the last Jamiroquai single to use the DVD format. The video consists of Jay Kay sitting and dancing in a forest, wearing his trademark feather headdress. He does several other things, such as creating balls of light and making the moon come out.

== Track listings ==
UK 12-inch single

1. "Corner of the Earth" (Radio Edit) – 3:55
2. "Main Vein" (Deep Swing's Jazzy Thumper Mix) – 7:51
3. "Main Vein" (Knee Deep Classic Mix) – 6:50
4. "Main Vein" (Knee Deep Vocal Dub) – 6:57

Australia CD single

1. "Corner of the Earth" (Radio Edit) – 3:55
2. "Bad Girls" (Live at The Brits 2002; featuring Anastacia) – 4:13
3. "Love Foolosophy" (Mondo Grosso Love Acoustic Mix) – 4:43
4. "Titan" (Live at Telewest Arena) – 3:25

== Charts ==
Weekly chart performance for "Corner of the Earth"
Chart (2002)	Peak position
Australia (ARIA)	52
Europe (Eurochart Hot 100)	90
Italy (FIMI)	21
Scotland Singles (OCC)	36
Switzerland (Schweizer Hitparade)	94
UK Singles (OCC)	31

== Release history ==
Release dates and formats for "Corner of the Earth"
Region	Date	Format(s)	Label(s)	Ref.
United Kingdom	8 July 2002	CD	Sony Soho Square	
Australia	15 July 2002	CD	Sony Soho Square; Columbia	
