= Spacemonkeyz =

British dub and reggae trio

- Illustration of the virtual band members alongside Gorillaz by Jamie Hewlett

Background information
- Also known as: Space Monkeyz
- Genres: Dub, reggae
- Years active: 2001-2002, 2010, 2017, 2021-2023
- Labels: Parlophone, Virgin
- Members: Darren Galea; Richie Stevens; Gavin Dodds

Spacemonkeyz are a musical group consisting of Darren Galea (DJ D-Zire), Richie Stevens and Gavin Dodds. They came together when Galea created a dub remix of the Gorillaz' "Tomorrow Comes Today" ("Tomorrow Dub", which was released as a B-side on the "Tomorrow Comes Today" single), which Gorillaz founder Damon Albarn liked so much that he asked Galea to remix the whole album Gorillaz. The resulting album, Laika Come Home, was released in July 2002. The album's first and only single "Lil' Dub Chefin'" reached #73 on the UK Singles Chart.

Spacemonkeyz also released a single with Taiwanese singer Stanley Huang and rapper The Last Emperor, "Spacemonkeyz Theme", which appeared as a B-side on "Lil' Dub Chefin'". They also remixed the Herbert Grönemeyer single "Mensch". Darren Galea performed turntables as part of the Gorillaz live band on all of the 'Gorillaz' & 'Demon Days' Live dates between 2000 and 2006.

Spacemonkeyz is a virtual band. According to the fictional Gorillaz biography Rise of the Ogre, the group is an actual team of monkeys used in space tests who had stolen the tracks from an unattended Kong Studios and remixed them without Gorillaz's permission.

Since the release of Laika Come Home, the band has not released any new albums. On the Hallelujah Monkeyz podcast on September 4, 2017, Richie Stevens that a new independent extended play was in the making, and that Spacemonkeyz was trying to get a label to help them distribute the project. On 26th May 2023, Space Monkeyz released the single "Honest Racket", containing the artists Richie Stevens and Dubversive.

== Discography ==
=== Albums ===
- 2002: Spacemonkeyz vs Gorillaz – Laika Come Home

=== Singles ===
- 2002: Spacemonkeyz vs Gorillaz – "Lil' Dub Chefin'"
- 2002: Herbert Grönemeyer – "Mensch" (Spacemonkeyz Remix)
- 2023: Spacemonkeyz, Richie Stevens & Dubversive - "Honest Racket"
