= The Temperance Movement (album) =

Studio album by The Temperance Movement
- Released: 16 September 2013
- Recorded: Fish Factory, Willesden, London; Submarine Studios, London
- Genres: Blues rock, hard rock
- Length: 51:31
- Label: Earache
- Producers: The Temperance Movement and Sam Miller

The Temperance Movement chronology
The Temperance Movement (2013)	White Bear (2016)

The Temperance Movement is the debut studio album by British rock band The Temperance Movement. The album, which was released on 16 September 2013, was recorded in the space of just four days at the Fish Factory, Willesden, North West London. The album is available on three formats: CD, cassette and vinyl. The standard edition vinyl is black, while there are limited edition white, blue and clear LPs. It was also made available to download via iTunes.

According to guitarist Luke Potashnick, The Temperance Movement "is about friendship, good times and redemption – losing your way, then finding it – over and over." He describes the album as "very song-driven", and he insists that the band had "no commercial agenda" in mind when making the album — they merely wanted "to write and perform good music that was real."

As of January 2016, the album has sold 31,645 copies.

== Track listing ==
All songs written by Phil Campbell, Luke Potashnick and Paul Sayer, except "Midnight Black" and "Lovers and Fighters", written by Phil Campbell.

No.	Title	Length
1.	"Only Friend"	4:29
2.	"Ain't No Telling"	3:52
3.	"Pride"	5:39
4.	"Be Lucky"	3:23
5.	"Midnight Black"	3:46
6.	"Chinese Lanterns"	3:21
7.	"Know for Sure"	4:12
8.	"Morning Riders"	3:40
9.	"Lovers and Fighters"	4:39
10.	"Take It Back"	3:04
11.	"Smouldering"	5:47
12.	"Serenity"	5:39

Vinyl bonus tracks
No.	Title	Length
13.	"Turn"
14.	"Mother's Eyes"

iTunes bonus tracks
No.	Title	Length
13.	"Mother's Eyes"
14.	"Already Know"

== Personnel ==
The Temperance Movement

- Phil Campbell — vocals
- Luke Potashnick — guitars
- Paul Sayer — guitars
- Nick Fyffe — bass
- Damon Wilson — drums

Production

- The Temperance Movement — production
- Sam Miller — production, recording, mixing
- Christian Wright — mastering

Other

- Russ Gilbert — artwork
- Caroline Perjesi — photography (front cover)
- Dominic Greensmith — photography (back cover)
- Jamie Wagg — photography (inside cover)
