= Simon Katz =

English songwriter and musician

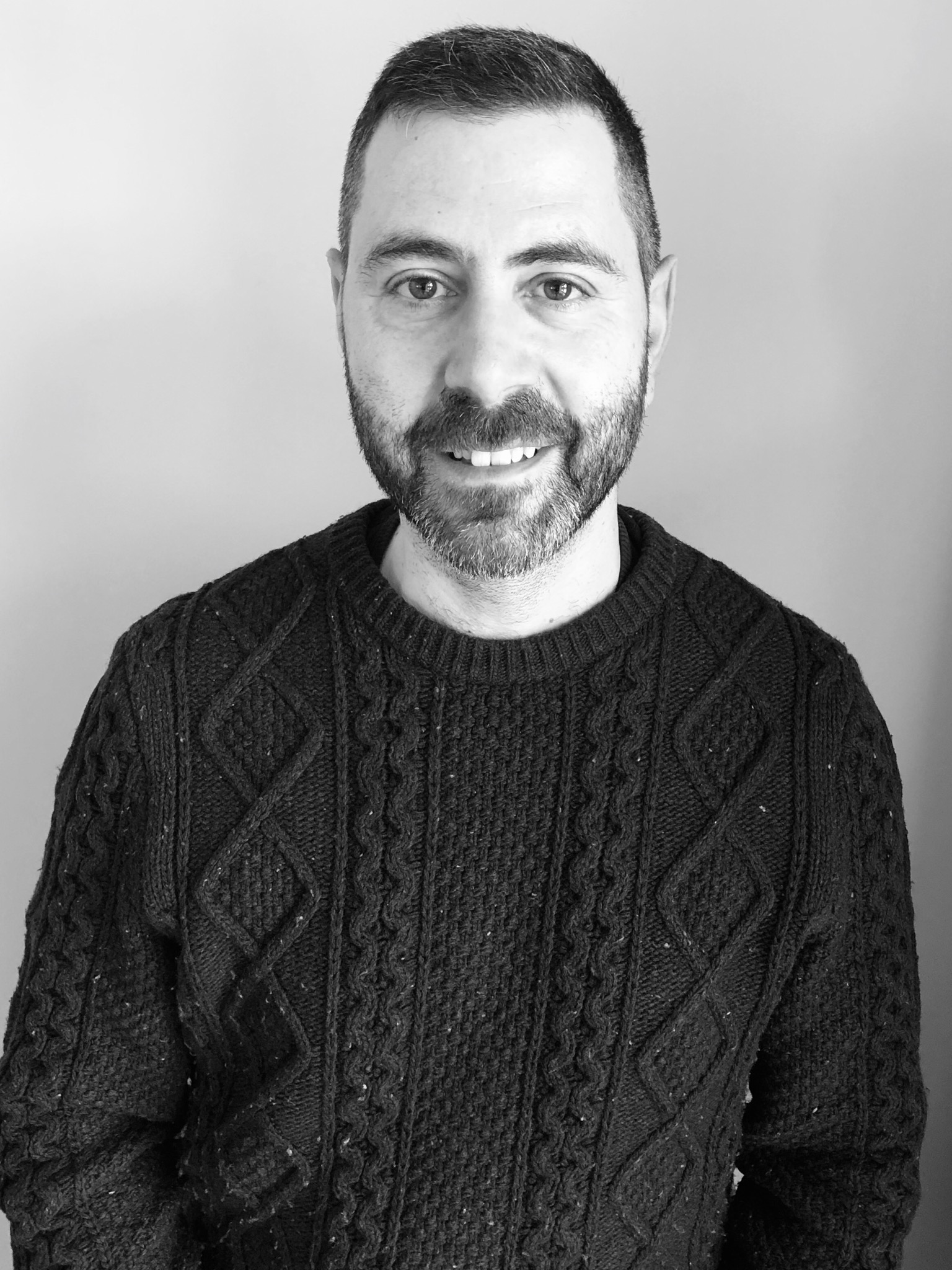
- Katz in 2019

Background information
- Born: Simon Laurence Katz; 16 May 1971 (age 55); Nottingham, England
- Genres: Acid jazz, funk rock, R&B, trip hop, pop
- Occupations: Musician, songwriter, producer
- Instruments: Guitar, bass, keyboards
- Years active: 1994–present
- Website: simonkatz.us

Simon Katz (born 16 May 1971) is an English songwriter and multi-instrumentalist, best known for his work with the bands Jamiroquai and Gorillaz. Katz has been nominated for 2 Grammy Awards and was a recipient of the Grammy Award for Best Pop Performance by a Duo Or Group With Vocal for Jamiroquai's "Virtual Insanity" in 1997, and the Ivor Novello Award for Outstanding Song Collection with Jamiroquai in 1999.

== Career ==
=== Jamiroquai, 1995–2000 ===
Katz joined Jamiroquai in 1995, remaining as a member until 2000. He was the band's guitarist on Travelling Without Moving (1996), which won a Grammy Award and four MTV Video Music Awards, and its follow-up, Synkronized (1999).

=== Gorillaz, 2001–2002 ===
In 2001, Katz joined Damon Albarn's group Gorillaz, an animated quartet with actual musicians providing the voice and instruments for the animated "band members." During live performances and on the 2002 remix album Laika Come Home, he played guitar as the character of Noodle, a 14-year-old Japanese schoolgirl and guitar prodigy. Katz was featured in the 2008 film Bananaz, which documents the development of the Gorillaz band from 2000 to 2006.

For Mali Music, Albarn's project exploring the music of West Africa, Katz performed with Albarn in Mali alongside kora player Toumani Diabaté and guitarist Afel Bocoum.

=== Other work ===
From 2002 to 2003, Katz served as musical director for Ms. Dynamite, during which time she won the Mercury Prize for her debut album, A Little Deeper; two Brit Awards, including Best British Female Artist, and three MOBO Awards.

In 2010, Katz co-wrote the ballad "Be Good to Me" for Sia's fifth studio album, We Are Born.

Katz occasionally works in film. He has been featured on the scores for the 2002 film City of God working alongside Brazilian Film Composer Antonio Pinto and the 2006 documentary ...More Than 1000 Words, and served as music supervisor on the 2008 film Ball Don't Lie.

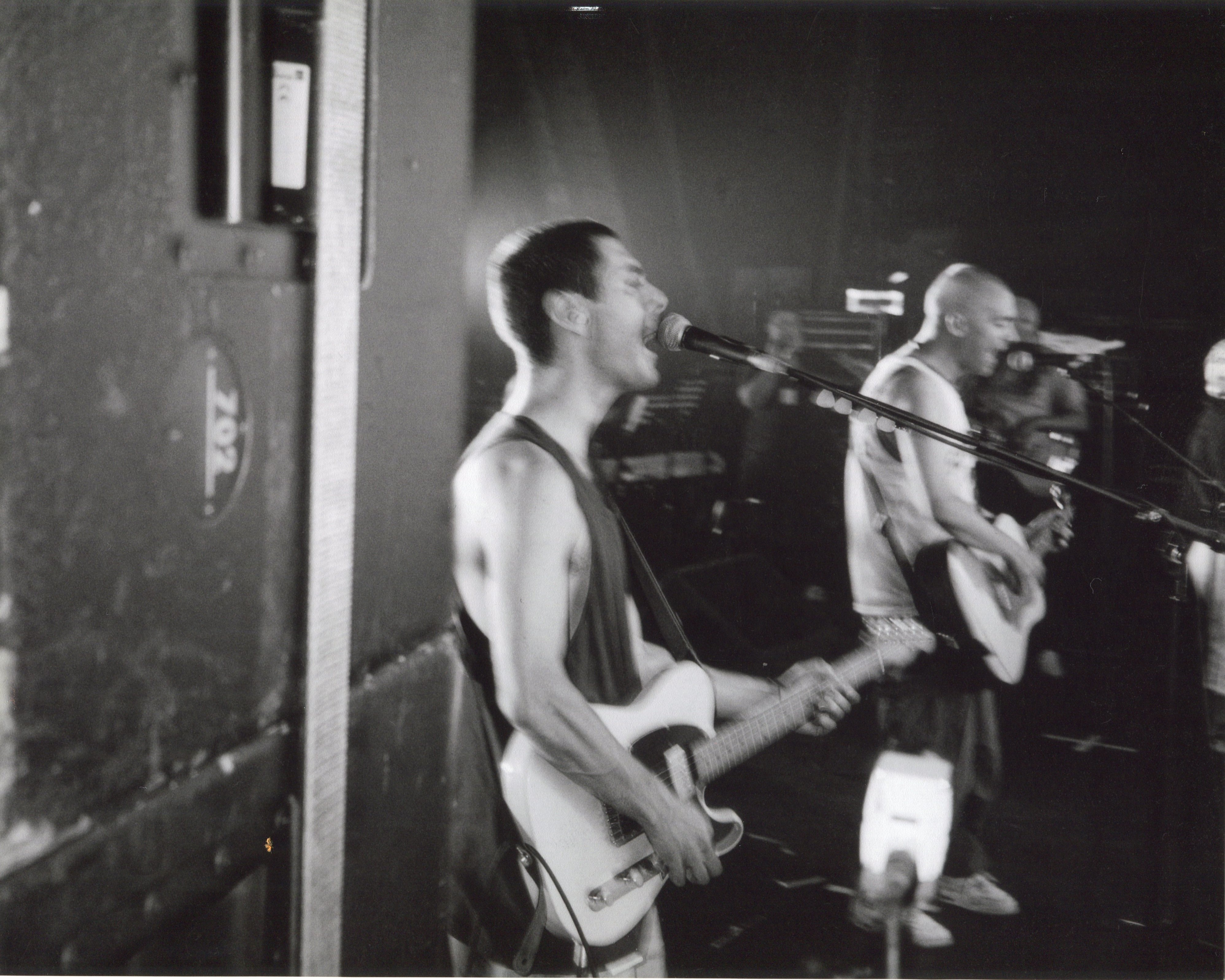
Katz (left) on stage with Gorillaz (Damon Albarn) at La Cigale in Paris, 2001.

Katz has also worked with Lana Del Rey, Diana Ross, Omar, Ronnie Wood, Tony Allen

== Personal life ==
Katz was born and raised in Nottingham, and raised in North London England. He currently resides between New York and London.

== Discography ==
=== Albums ===
- Jamiroquai – The Return of the Space Cowboy (1994, Sony)
- Jamiroquai – Travelling Without Moving (1996, Sony)
- Jamiroquai – Synkronized (1999, Sony)
- HKB FiNN – Vitalistics (2002, Son Records)
- Spacemonkeyz vs. Gorillaz – Laika Come Home (2002, Parlaphone)
- E2K – If Not Now (2003, Topic)
- Gemma Fox – Messy (2004, Polydor)
- Mad Professor – Method to the Madness (2005, Sanctuary)
- Jamiroquai – High Times: Singles 1992-2006 (2006, Sony)
- Platinum Pied Pipers – Abundance (2009, Ubiquity)
- Sia – We Are Born (2010, Sony)
- Dazzled Kid – Fire Needs Air (2011, Dazzled Kid Records)
- Sambismo – The Birth Of... (2012)
