= Seven Days in Sunny June =

2005 single by Jamiroquai

"Seven Days In Sunny June"

Single by Jamiroquai

from the album Dynamite
- Released: 15 August 2005
- Length: 4:02
- Label: Sony BMG; Epic
- Songwriters: Jay Kay; Matt Johnson
- Producer: Mike Spencer

Jamiroquai singles chronology
"Feels Just Like It Should" (2005)	"Seven Days In Sunny June" (2005)	"(Don't) Give Hate a Chance" (2005)

Music video
- "Seven Days in Sunny June" on YouTube

"Seven Days in Sunny June" is the second single from British funk and acid jazz band Jamiroquai's sixth studio album, Dynamite (2005). Written by lead singer Jay Kay and new keyboardist Matt Johnson, the track is considered to be a throwback to the old acid jazz sound upon which Jamiroquai made their name. The song peaked at number 14 on the UK Singles Chart.

== Music video ==
The video features the band having a pool party in a garden, where they do random things such as playing with a beach ball, riding minibikes, throwing confetti, as well as having ketchup lowered from a helicopter, as Jay Kay sings the lyrics. However, the word "bomb" in "drop the bomb on me" is cut out, as it—alongside the radio edit—released a month after the 7/7 terrorist attacks in London. Kay changes his clothing seven times, representing the 7 days of the week, with one of the garments being a Peru-national-football-team-inspired jacket. The video ends with Kay on the ground, laughing.

== Track listings ==
UK CD1

1. "Seven Days in Sunny June"
2. "Seven Days in Sunny June" (Steve Mac Classic Remix)

UK CD2 & Australian CD single

1. "Seven Days in Sunny June"
2. "Seven Days in Sunny June" (Steve Mac Classic Remix)
3. "Seven Days in Sunny June" (Oliver Lang remix)
4. "Seven Days in Sunny June" (Blackbeard remix)

== Charts ==
Chart (2005)	Peak position
Australia (ARIA)	56
Belgium (Ultratip Bubbling Under Flanders)	5
Belgium (Ultratip Bubbling Under Wallonia)	10
Germany (GfK)	78
Hungary (Rádiós Top 40)	37
Ireland (IRMA)	38
Italy (FIMI)	15
Netherlands (Single Top 100)	49
Scotland Singles (OCC)	24
Switzerland (Schweizer Hitparade)	79
UK Singles (OCC)	14
UK Hip Hop/R&B (OCC)	4

Chart (2025)	Peak position
Japan Hot Overseas (Billboard Japan)	17

== Release history ==
Region	Date	Format(s)	Label(s)	Ref.
United Kingdom	15 August 2005	CD	Sony BMG	
Denmark	29 August 2005	CD	Sony BMG	
Australia	5 September 2005	CD	Sony BMG	
