= White Bear (album) =

Studio album by the Temperance Movement
- Released: 15 January 2016
- Studios: Fish Factory, Willesden, London; Angelic Studio, Northamptonshire; Rockfield Studios, Monmouth
- Genres: Blues rock, hard rock
- Length: 35:42
- Label: Earache
- Producers: The Temperance Movement and Sam Miller

The Temperance Movement chronology
The Temperance Movement (2013)	White Bear (2016)	A Deeper Cut (2018)

White Bear is the second studio album by British rock band the Temperance Movement. The album was produced in 2015 and released on 15 January 2016.

== Track listing ==
All songs written by the Temperance Movement.

No.	Title	Length
1.	"Three Bulleits"
2.	"Get Yourself Free"
3.	"A Pleasant Peace I Feel"
4.	"Modern Massacre"
5.	"Battle Lines"
6.	"White Bear"
7.	"Oh Lorraine"
8.	"Magnify"
9.	"The Sun and Moon Roll Around Too Soon"
10.	"I Hope I'm Not Losing My Mind"

== Personnel ==
The Temperance Movement

- Phil Campbell — vocals
- Luke Potashnick — guitars
- Paul Sayer — guitars
- Nick Fyffe — bass
- Damon Wilson — drums

Production

- The Temperance Movement — production
- Sam Miller — production, recording, mixing
- John Davis — mastering

Design

- Steven Sebring — cover image and photography
- Graham Erickson — art direction
