= Little L =

2001 single by Jamiroquai

Single by Jamiroquai

from the album A Funk Odyssey
- Released: 8 August 2001
- Length: 4:55 (album version); 3:57 (single edit)
- Label: Sony Soho Square
- Songwriters: Jay Kay; Toby Smith
- Producer: Rick Pope

Jamiroquai singles chronology
"I'm in the Mood for Love" (2000)	"Little L" (2001)	"You Give Me Something" (2001)

Music video
- "Little L" on YouTube

"Little L" is the lead single from British funk and acid jazz band Jamiroquai's fifth studio album, A Funk Odyssey (2001). The song was written by Jay Kay and Toby Smith and was inspired by the break-up between Kay and his former girlfriend Denise van Outen, which occurred due to conflicting work commitments and which led to Kay's cocaine problem.

"Little L" was released on 8 August 2001 in Japan and on 13 August 2001 in the United Kingdom. The song reached number one in Spain, number two in Italy, and number five in the United Kingdom, Finland, and Portugal. In the United States, the song peaked at number two on the Billboard Dance Club Play chart.

== Music video ==
Directed by Stéphane Sednaoui, the video features Jay Kay dancing in a futuristic nightclub. It features scenes depicting Kay dancing in a black background with a colorful dance floor, with special effects of holograms. During the breakdown, Kay’s outfit glows and sports black lit Native American makeup. Sofia Boutella can also be seen.

== Track listings ==
UK CD single

1. "Little L" (single edit)
2. "Little L" (Wounded Buffalo remix)
3. "Little L" (Bob Sinclar remix)
4. "Little L" (Boris Dlugosch mix)
5. "Little L" (video)

UK 12-inch single

A1. "Little L" (single edit)
A2. "Little L" (Wounded Buffalo remix)
B1. "Little L" (Bob Sinclar remix)
B2. "Little L" (Boris Dlugosch mix)

UK cassette single

1. "Little L" (single edit)
2. "Little L" (Wounded Buffalo remix)

Australian CD single

1. "Little L" (single edit)
2. "Little L" (Bob Sinclar remix)
3. "Little L" (Boris Dlugosch mix)
4. "Little L" (Boris Dlugosch dub)

Japanese CD single

1. "Little L" (radio edit) – 3:57
2. "Little L" (Boris Dlugosch mix) – 6:11
3. "Little L" (Boris Dlugosch dub) – 6:16
4. "Little L" (Bob Sinclar remix) – 7:27

US CD single

1. "Little L" (single edit) – 3:57
2. "Little L" (Bob Sinclar remix) – 7:26
3. "Little L" (Boris Dlugosch mix) – 6:14
4. "Little L" (Blaze Shelter mix) – 6:18
5. "You Give Me Something" (Full Intention club mix) – 7:11

== Charts ==
=== Weekly charts ===
Chart (2001–2002)	Peak position
Australia (ARIA)	14
Australian Club Chart (ARIA)	2
Austria (Ö3 Austria Top 40)	53
Belgium (Ultratop 50 Flanders)	40
Belgium (Ultratop 50 Wallonia)	17
Canada (Nielsen SoundScan)	7
Europe (Eurochart Hot 100)	12
Finland (Suomen virallinen lista)	5
France (SNEP)	22
Germany (GfK)	56
Hungary (Mahasz)	6
Ireland (IRMA)	16
Ireland Dance (IRMA)	7
Italy (FIMI)	2
Netherlands (Dutch Top 40)	40
Netherlands (Single Top 100)	51
New Zealand (Recorded Music NZ)	44
Norway (VG-lista)	20
Portugal (AFP)	5
Scottish Singles Sales (Official Charts)	6
Spain (Promusicae)	1
Sweden (Sverigetopplistan)	42
Switzerland (Schweizer Hitparade)	17
UK Singles (Official Charts)	5
UK Dance (Official Charts)	6
US Dance Club Songs (Billboard)	2
US Dance Singles Sales (Billboard)	24

=== Year-end charts ===
Chart (2001)	Position
Australian Club Chart (ARIA)	17
Canada (Nielsen SoundScan)	92
UK Singles (OCC)	97
US Dance Club Play (Billboard)	9

== Certifications ==
Region	Certification	Certified units/sales
Mexico (AMPROFON)	Gold	30,000^{‡}
New Zealand (RMNZ)	Gold	15,000^{‡}
United Kingdom (BPI)	Gold	400,000^{‡}
^{‡} Sales+streaming figures based on certification alone.

== Release history ==
Region	Date	Format(s)	Label(s)	Ref.
United Kingdom	July 2001	Promotional	Sony Soho Square	
Continental Europe	July 2001	Promotional	Sony Soho Square	
Japan	8 August 2001	CD	Epic	
United Kingdom	13 August 2001	12-inch vinyl; CD; cassette	Sony Soho Square	
Australia	13 August 2001	CD	Sony Soho Square; Columbia	
United States	28 August 2001	Contemporary hit radio	Sony Soho Square; Epic	
