= Supersonic (Jamiroquai song) =

1999 single by Jamiroquai

Single by Jamiroquai

from the album Synkronized
- B-side: "Supersonic" (remix)
- Released: 13 September 1999
- Length: 5:14 (album version); 3:40 (radio edit)
- Label: Sony Soho Square
- Songwriters: Jay Kay; Toby Smith; Derrick McKenzie; Sola Akingbola; Wallis Buchanan; Simon Katz
- Producers: Jay Kay; Al Stone

Jamiroquai singles chronology
| "Canned Heat" (1999) | "Supersonic" (1999) | "Black Capricorn Day" (1999) |

Music video
- "Supersonic" on YouTube

"Supersonic" is the second single from British funk/acid jazz band Jamiroquai's fourth studio album, Synkronized (1999). The song was written by Jay Kay, Toby Smith, Derrick McKenzie, Sola Akingbola, Wallis Buchanan, and Simon Katz while Jay Kay and Al Stone produced it. The track peaked at No. 22 on the UK Singles Chart and became Jamiroquai's third No. 1 on the US Dance Club Play chart.

== Critical reception ==
Jon Barnsley from News of the World commented, "Yet another winner from Jay Kay, Supersonic is one of the most mesmerising tracks from the Synkronized LP. The original's didgeridoo sounds and super-funky bass have really been given the treatment with fantastic mixes from Pete Heller, Restless Soul and the Sharp Boys. Overall it has a darker, moodier feel than recent hit Canned Heat, but it's just as addictive. And it's available not only on CD and cassette but on 12-inch vinyl too!"

== Music video ==
The accompanying music video for "Supersonic" begins with the message "ru ready for a supersonic synkronized audio and visual experience?" on the screen, flashing red. The camera zooms into an "orb" and Jay Kay appears. The orb moves around him while he is dancing the robot and it flashes along with the song's tune. A yellow one appears along with a green, orange and purple one. More orbs are seen behind the first five. The camera itself changes angle. It then zooms into a red orb and Jay Kay is seen within it.

The second part of the video features a tunnel-like stage with LED-covered walls. Jay Kay and other bandmembers are seen "hovering" across the stage. A large audience appears. The LEDs form a sneaking man animation. Finally, the stage explodes and Jay Kay falls on the floor, the sneaking man LED animation is seen leaving from under him, stage right.

== Track listings ==
- UK CD1
1. "Supersonic" (radio edit) – 3:41
2. "Supersonic" (Pete Heller – The Love mix) – 9:35
3. "Supersonic" (Harvey's Fuel Altered mix) – 6:35
- UK CD2
1. "Supersonic" – 5:15
2. "Supersonic" (Restless Soul main vocal) – 7:35
3. "Supersonic" (Sharp Razor remix) – 7:04
- UK cassette single
1. "Supersonic" (radio edit) – 3:41
2. "Supersonic" – 5:15

== Charts ==
=== Weekly charts ===
| Chart (1999–2000) | Peak position |
|---|---|
| Belgium (Ultratip Bubbling Under Flanders) | 16 |
| Europe (Eurochart Hot 100) | 75 |
| Iceland (Íslenski Listinn Topp 40) | 3 |
| Netherlands (Single Top 100) | 75 |
| Scotland Singles (OCC) | 26 |
| UK Singles (OCC) | 22 |
| US Dance Club Songs (Billboard) | 1 |

=== Year-end charts ===
| Chart (2000) | Position |
|---|---|
| US Dance Club Play (Billboard) | 25 |
