= Canned Heat (song) =

1999 single by Jamiroquai

Single by Jamiroquai

from the album Synkronized
- B-side: "Wolf in Sheep's Clothing"; "Deeper Underground" (Chillington mix)
- Released: 24 May 1999
- Genre: Disco
- Length: 5:30 (album version); 3:19 (radio edit); 3:46 (7-inch edit)
- Label: Sony Soho Square
- Songwriters: Jay Kay; Sola Akingbola; Wallis Buchanan; Simon Katz; Derrick McKenzie; Toby Smith
- Producers: Toby Smith; Al Stone

Jamiroquai singles chronology
"Deeper Underground" (1998)	"Canned Heat" (1999)	"Supersonic" (1999)

Audio sample
- file; help

Music video
- "Canned Heat" on YouTube

"Canned Heat" is the lead single from British funk group Jamiroquai's fourth studio album, Synkronized (1999). Released on 24 May 1999, it became their second number-one single on the US Dance Club Play chart and peaked at number four on the UK Singles Chart. The music video was directed by Jonas Åkerlund. The song is notably used in Napoleon Dynamite (2004).

== Release ==
Over the numerous releases of the "Canned Heat" single, two B-sides exist. "Wolf in Sheep's Clothing" is a funky instrumental that features an intro of two drum beats that lasts about 1.5 seconds and then enters a strongly bass-driven, repetitive melody (which is very reminiscent of "Stayin' Alive" by the Bee Gees). Many keyboard effects are used throughout the song's 4-minute duration. The song enters a percussion section at 3:07 and lasts for the remainder of the song, slowly fading out from 3:45. The song was originally released as part of the charity album No Boundaries: A Benefit for the Kosovar Refugees in 1998 before being included on this single. It is also available on some editions of the Synkronized album, the Australian double disc release being an example.

The Chillington mix of "Deeper Underground" is included on the second release of "Canned Heat". Chillington is not the name of an artist or DJ but instead the name of the studios at Jay's Home in Buckinghamshire. The Chillington mix heavily samples the Jamiroquai song "Getinfunky", which is found on some special releases of Synkronized, including the Japanese release, where it replaced "Deeper Underground" as the bonus track, and alongside "Wolf in Sheep's Clothing" on the Australian double disc. On the High Times: The Singles DVD, Jay comments on a bonus feature that the original Godzilla song was just made of "Ominous noises" which strongly matches the sound of "Getinfunky". When the song's "ominous noises" are pared away, it strongly suggests that "Getinfunky" is an early version of the Godzilla song which later evolved into "Deeper Underground".

== Critical reception ==
Daily Record wrote, "Cat in the hatster, Jay Kay[,] returns with another distinctive and clever funk tune". Sunday Mirror said, "Seventies funk, expensive video, silly hat. Well, it worked last time didn't it? And the time before that." Howard Cohen from The Miami Herald called it "a buzzed mirror-ball escapee from Studio 54".

== Music video ==
A music video was made to accompany the song. It was directed by Swedish director Jonas Åkerlund. In the video, Jay Kay is in his London apartment awake on his bed, and he decides to get up and put his shoes on. Once he does, he then talks to one of his walls and then phases through the wall into a living room. He then does a bit of dancing around before leaping through another wall into a dining room as he dances on the table, messing up the setup as he swings on a chandelier through another wall into a room where a party is going on. He dances about and inexplicably starts floating around, defying gravity. He then floats off and emerges into a bathroom, continuing to dance, and then goes into a couple's room and continues to dance and mess around before going back to the party room and doing more dancing there. He then goes to the corridor and jumps through a door into a bedroom where a pair of sweethearts are engaged in acts of desire as he keeps dancing and goofing around before flying into a TV. He sings as he flies while shifting positions before making it back to the party room. He then goes to a kitchen and trashes it, turning a table over and knocking the chairs over, before leaping back to the party room again. After that, he leaps to a room where a slumber party is being held as he slides and dances about on the ceiling in the room. Next, he goes back to the party room and phases outside the room, leaping around a corridor and merging at some stairs before going through a door and going back down another corridor back to his apartment, where he collapses back on the bed and falls asleep where he started.

== Track listings ==
UK CD1 and Japanese CD single

1. "Canned Heat" (7-inch edit) – 3:46
2. "Canned Heat" (radio edit) – 3:19
3. "Wolf in Sheep's Clothing" – 4:00

UK CD2

1. "Canned Heat" (7-inch edit) – 3:46
2. "Canned Heat" (album version) – 5:30
3. "Deeper Underground" (Chillington mix) – 6:56

UK and US cassette single; US CD and 7-inch single

1. "Canned Heat" (7-inch edit) – 3:46
2. "Wolf in Sheep's Clothing" – 4:00

European CD single

1. "Canned Heat" (7-inch edit) – 3:46
2. "Canned Heat" (radio edit) – 3:19

Australian CD single; US maxi-CD and maxi-cassette single

1. "Canned Heat" (7-inch edit) – 3:46
2. "Canned Heat" (radio edit) – 3:19
3. "Wolf in Sheep's Clothing" – 4:00
4. "Canned Heat" (album version) – 5:30
5. "Deeper Underground" (Chillington mix) – 6:56

US 12-inch single

A. "Canned Heat" – 5:30
B. "Deeper Underground" (Chillington mix) – 6:56

== Charts ==
=== Weekly charts ===
Chart (1999)	Peak position
Australia (ARIA)	20
Belgium (Ultratop 50 Flanders)	43
Belgium (Ultratop 50 Wallonia)	39
Canada (Nielsen SoundScan)	7
Canada Dance/Urban (RPM)	7
Europe (Eurochart Hot 100)	9
Finland (Suomen virallinen lista)	3
France (SNEP)	30
Germany (GfK)	28
Hungary (Mahasz)	2
Iceland (Íslenski Listinn Topp 40)	2
Ireland (IRMA)	14
Italy (Musica e dischi)	7
Italy Airplay (Music & Media)	1
Netherlands (Dutch Top 40)	29
Netherlands (Single Top 100)	31
New Zealand (Recorded Music NZ)	26
Norway (VG-lista)	15
Scottish Singles Sales (Official Charts)	3
Spain (Promusicae)	2
Sweden (Sverigetopplistan)	35
Switzerland (Schweizer Hitparade)	9
UK Singles (Official Charts)	4
US Dance Club Songs (Billboard)	1
US Dance Singles Sales (Billboard)	17

Chart (2026)	Peak position
Japan Hot Overseas (Billboard Japan)	14

=== Year-end charts ===
Chart (1999)	Position
UK Singles (OCC)	101
UK Airplay (Music Week)	7
US Dance Club Play (Billboard)	12

== Certifications ==
Region	Certification	Certified units/sales
Mexico (AMPROFON) album version	Gold	30,000^{‡}
New Zealand (RMNZ)	Gold	15,000^{‡}
United Kingdom (BPI)	Gold	400,000^{‡}
^{‡} Sales+streaming figures based on certification alone.

== Release history ==
Region	Date	Format(s)	Label(s)	Ref.
United Kingdom	24 May 1999	CD; cassette	Sony Soho Square	
Japan	2 June 1999	CD	Epic	
United States	28 June 1999	Hot adult contemporary radio	Work	
