= Nick Fyffe =

English bassist (born 1972)

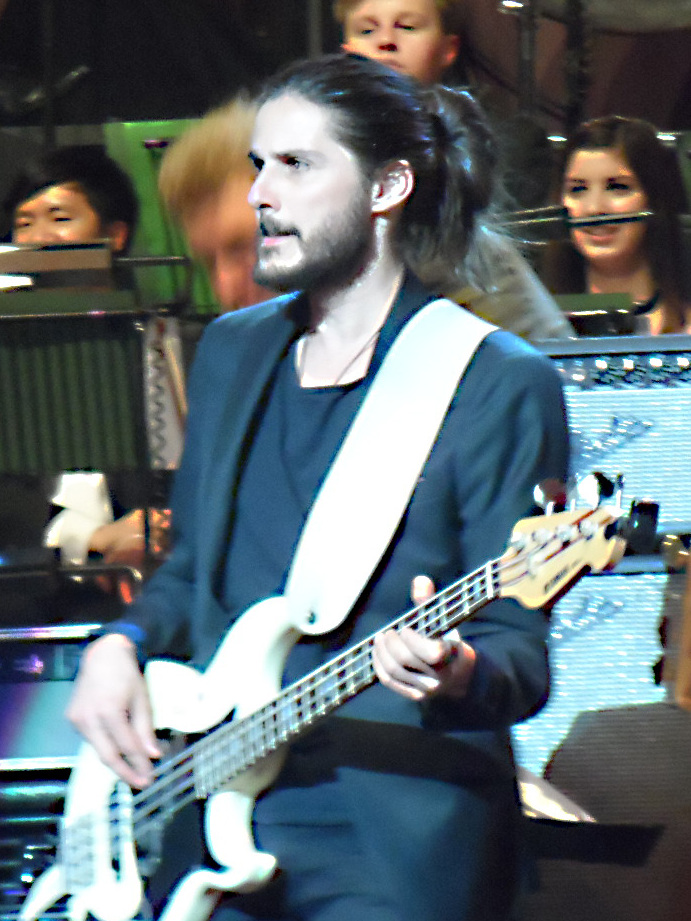
- Fyffe in 2012

Background information
- Born: 14 October 1972 (age 53); Reading, England
- Genres: Pop; electronic; rock
- Occupation: Bassist
- Instrument: Bass
- Years active: 1999–present
- Member of: The Temperance Movement
- Formerly of: Jamiroquai; Hard-Fi; Deep Purple; Thenewno2

Nick Fyffe (born 14 October 1972) is an English bassist, currently performing with The Temperance Movement and best known for being an ex-bassist of English funk group Jamiroquai. He replaced Stuart Zender in 1998, for the recording of their 1999 album Synkronized. He was in the process of applying to a Jamiroquai tribute band when he got the offer to join Jamiroquai. Fyffe recorded and toured with the band until his departure in 2003.

Since his departure from Jamiroquai, Fyffe has been lecturing at various colleges and playing with the English electronic group The Shapeshifters as well as blues rock band The Temperance Movement, whose self-titled first album was released on 16 September 2013. Subsequent albums with The Temperance Movement include White Bear (2016) and A Deeper Cut (2018).

Fyffe regularly takes part in 'The Sunflower Jam', an annual live music event intended to raise money to provide alternative medicine in National Health Service hospitals. Since the first event in 2006, he has played alongside Robert Plant, Deep Purple, Status Quo, and Bruce Dickinson .

He is an alumnus from Chichester College. He is related to the early-20th-century entertainer Will Fyffe.

In October 2009, Fyffe was picked to join Thenewno2—which includes members Dhani Harrison, the son of Beatle George Harrison; Jeremy Faccone; Jonathan Sadoff; and touring drummer Frank Zummo, who would go on to drum for Sum 41 in 2015—on their US tour with the Australian rock band Wolfmother.

Fyffe played on Thenewno2's first album, You Are Here, along with Harrison and fellow founding member Oliver Hecks.

In May 2011, he played a series of concerts with Deep Purple while Roger Glover was on paternity leave.
