= List of awards and nominations received by Jamiroquai =

Jamiroquai awards and nominations
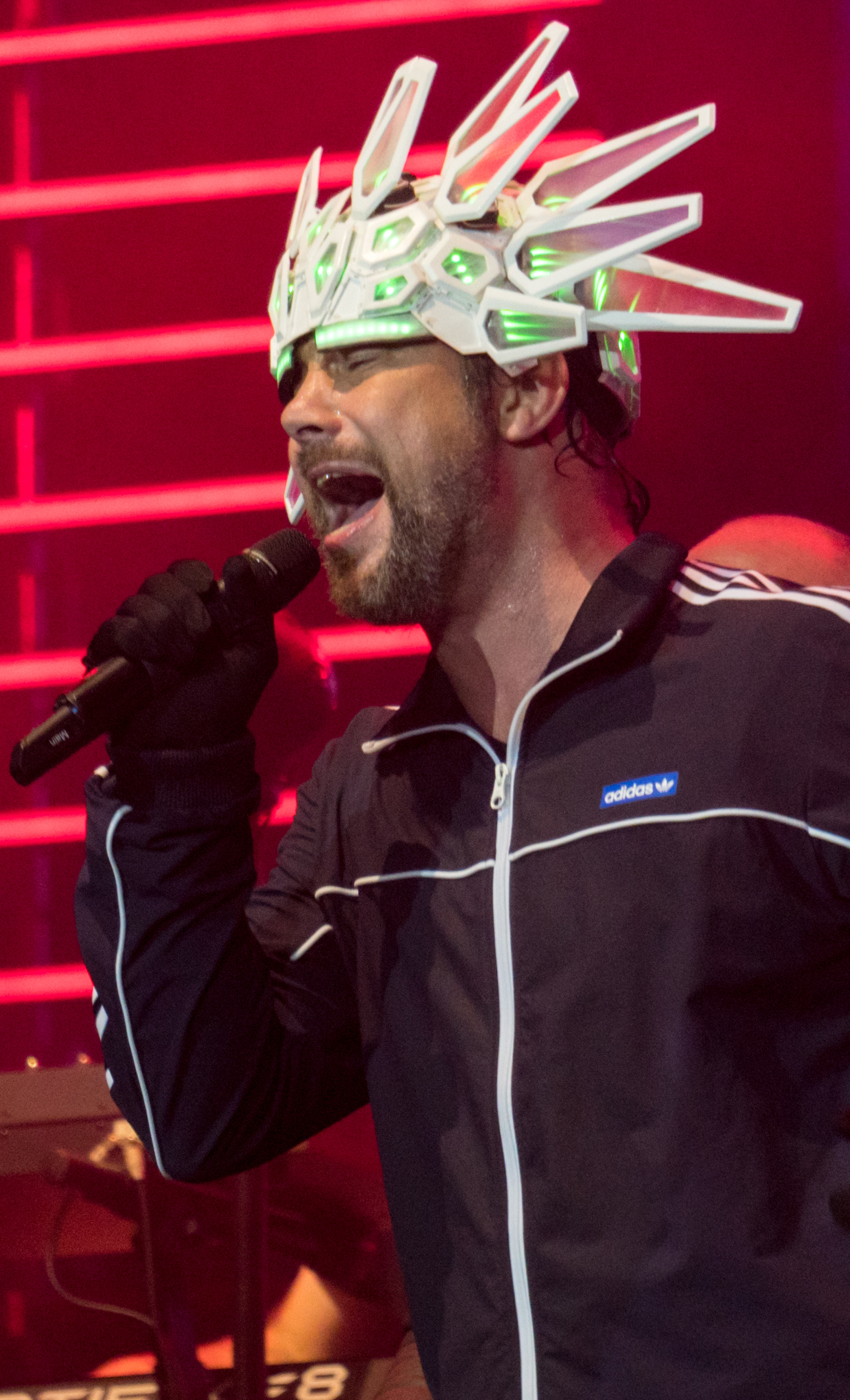
- Front-man Jay Kay (pictured in 2017) won a BMI Presidents Award "in recognition of his profound influence on songwriting within the music industry."
Awards and nominations
Award	Wins	Nominations
Billboard Music Awards	2	0
Brit Awards	0	15
Grammy Awards	1	2
Hungarian Music Awards	1	4
Japan Gold Disc Awards	2	0
IFPI Platinum Europe Awards	5	0
MTV Europe Music Awards	0	3
MTV Video Music Awards	2	2
Žebřík Music Awards	2	8

Totals (Note: Certain award groups do not simply award one winner. They acknowledge several different recipients, have runners-up, and have third place. Since this is a specific recognition and is different from losing an award, runner-up mentions are considered wins in this award tally. For simplification and to avoid errors, each award in this list has been presumed to have had a prior nomination.)
- Wins: 18
- Nominations: 40

This is a list of music awards and award nominations received by the English funk and acid jazz band Jamiroquai, When front-man Jay Kay signed with Sony Music, the band released Emergency on Planet Earth in 1993. The following year, the album was nominated for Best British Album at the Brit Awards and for the band Best British Breakthrough and Best British Group. The band received an additional 12 Brit Awards nominations during the course of their career. The group has won an Ivor Novello Award for Outstanding Song Collection from the British Academy of Songwriters, Composers, and Authors, as well as one Grammy Award, two MTV Video Music Awards, with "Virtual Insanity", being named Video of the Year at the 1997 MTV Video Music Awards, and two Billboard Music Awards.

== Awards and nominations ==
Award	Year	Nominee(s)	Category	Result	Ref.
Billboard Music Awards	1997	"Virtual Insanity"	Alternative/Modern Rock Clip of the Year	Won	
Billboard Music Awards	1997	"Virtual Insanity"	Maximum Vision Award	Won	
BMI Awards	2017	Jay Kay	BMI Presidents Award	Won	
Best Art Vinyl	2006	"Space Cowboy"	Best Vinyl Art	Nominated	
Brit Awards	1994	Themselves	Best British Breakthrough	Nominated	
Brit Awards	1994	Themselves	Best British Group	Nominated	
Brit Awards	1994	Themselves	Best British Dance Act	Nominated	
Brit Awards	1994	Emergency on Planet Earth	Best British Album	Nominated	
Brit Awards	1994	Too Young To Die	Best British Video	Nominated	
Brit Awards	1995	"Space Cowboy"	Best British Video	Nominated	
Brit Awards	1997	"Virtual Insanity"	Best British Video	Nominated	
Brit Awards	1997	Travelling Without Moving	Best Pop Album	Nominated	
Brit Awards	1998	Themselves	Best British Dance Act	Nominated	
Brit Awards	1998	"Alright"	Best British Video	Nominated	
Brit Awards	1999	"Deeper Underground"	Best British Video	Nominated	
Brit Awards	1999	Themselves	Best British Dance Act	Nominated	
Brit Awards	2000	Themselves	Best British Dance Act	Nominated	
Brit Awards	2002	Themselves	Best British Group	Nominated	
Brit Awards	2003	Themselves	Best British Dance Act	Nominated	
Grammy Awards	1998	"Virtual Insanity"	Best Performance By A Duo Or Group	Won	
Grammy Awards	1998	Travelling Without Moving	Best Pop Album	Nominated	
Grammy Awards	2005	"Feels Just Like It Should"	Best Short Form Music Video	Nominated	
Hungarian Music Awards	1998	Travelling Without Moving	Best Foreign Album	Won	
Hungarian Music Awards	2000	Synkronized	Best Foreign Dance Album	Nominated	
Hungarian Music Awards	2002	A Funk Odyssey	Best Foreign Dance Album	Nominated	
Hungarian Music Awards	2011	Rock Dust Light Star	Modern Pop / Rock Album of the Year	Nominated	
Hungarian Music Awards	2018	Automaton	Pop / Rock Album of the Year	Nominated	
IFPI Platinum Europe Awards	1996	Travelling Without Moving	Award Level 1	Won	
IFPI Platinum Europe Awards	1997	Travelling Without Moving	Award Level 2	Won	
IFPI Platinum Europe Awards	1999	Synkronized	Award Level 1	Won	
IFPI Platinum Europe Awards	2000	Travelling Without Moving	Award Level 3	Won	
IFPI Platinum Europe Awards	2001	A Funk Odyssey	Award Level 1	Won	
International Dance Music Award	2007	"Runaway"	Best Breaks / Electro Track	Nominated	
Ivor Novello Award	1999	Themselves	Outstanding Song Collection	Won	
Japan Gold Disc Awards	1997	Travelling Without Moving	Best Album of the Year – Rock / Folk	Won	
Japan Gold Disc Awards	2000	Synkronized	Rock Album of the Year	Won	
Kiss Awards	2005	Themselves	Best Male Artist	Nominated	
MOBO Awards	1997	Travelling Without Moving	Best Album	Won	
MOBO Awards	2005	"Feels Just Like It Should"	Best Video	Nominated	
MTV Europe Music Awards	1996	"Virtual Insanity"	MTV Select	Nominated	
MTV Europe Music Awards	1999	Themselves	Best Group	Nominated	
MTV Europe Music Awards	1999	Themselves	Best Dance	Nominated	
MTV Video Music Awards	1997	Themselves	Best New Artist	Nominated	
MTV Video Music Awards	1997	"Virtual Insanity"	Video of the Year	Won	
MTV Video Music Awards	1997	"Virtual Insanity"	Breakthrough Video	Won	
MTV Video Music Awards	1997	"Virtual Insanity"	Best Choreography	Nominated	
MTV Video Music Awards	1997	"Virtual Insanity"	Viewers Choice	Nominated	
Silver Clef Award	1998	Themselves	Silver Clef Award	Won	
Žebřík Music Awards	1996	Themselves	Best International Group	Nominated	
Žebřík Music Awards	1996	Themselves	Best International Surprise	Nominated	
Žebřík Music Awards	1996	Travelling Without Moving	Best International Album	Nominated	
Žebřík Music Awards	1996	"Cosmic Girl"	Best International Song	Nominated	
Žebřík Music Awards	1996	"Virtual Insanity"	Best International Video	Nominated	
Žebřík Music Awards	1999	Themselves	Best International Group	Nominated	
Žebřík Music Awards	1999	Synkronized	Best International Album	Nominated	
Žebřík Music Awards	1999	"Canned Heat"	Best International Song	Won	
Žebřík Music Awards	2005	Jay Kay	Best International Male	Nominated	
Žebřík Music Awards	2017	"Automaton"	Best International Video	Nominated	
