= Mandidextrous =

English electronic music DJ and producer

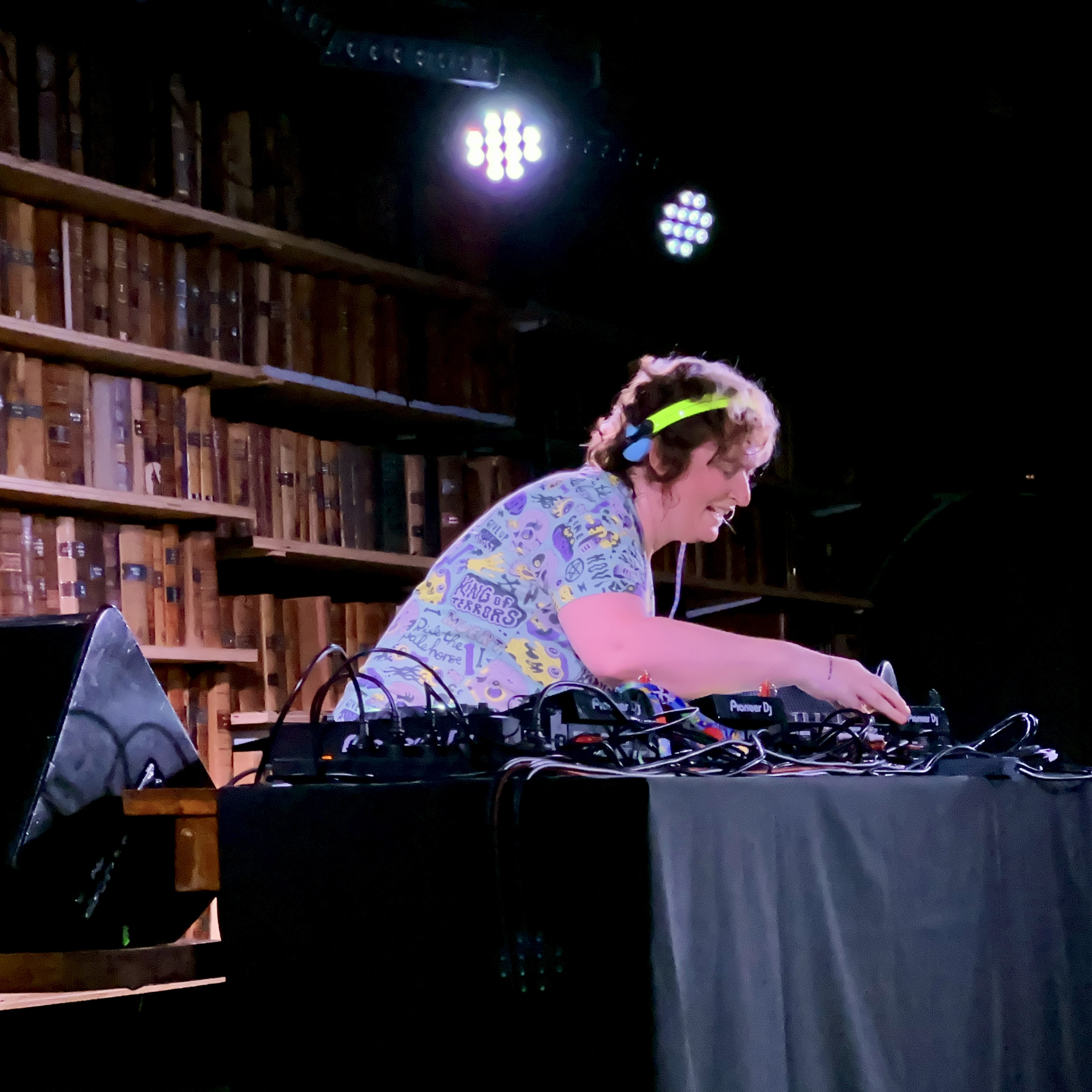
- Mandidextrous playing Meow in Wellington, January 2026

Background information
- Also known as: Mastral
- Genres: Tekno; drum and bass
- Occupations: DJ, record producer
- Years active: 2000–present
- Labels: Amen4tekno, Speedbass

Mandi Gordon better known by their stage name Mandidextrous is a DJ and record producer based in Bristol, England.

They are best known for being a pioneer of free tekno as well as speed bass, a subgenre of drum and bass with a 4x4 beat, influenced by tekno.

== Early life ==
Gordon first discovered rave music through jungle records in the 1990s, specifically General Levy and M-Beat's "Incredible". After being kicked out of their home at age 15, Gordon spent their adolescence living in squats. It's during this time where they started performing at various raves across Buckinghamshire and Oxford.

== Career ==
Early in Gordon's career, they were highly active in the illegal rave scene, starting to DJ in the year 2000. In around 2008, they shifted their focus from promoting raves to establishing their own career. They originally performed under the name Mastral, however changed their stage name following their gender transition.

As a prominent figure in the emerging tekno scene, Gordon established Amen4Tekno, a record label which showcased raggatek, hardtek and jungletek. The label was established in the early 2000s and has featured prominent artists including Dolphin, Hellfish and The Teknoist.

In 2025, Gordon launched a second record label, Speedbass Recordings. The label and subgenre of the same name focusses on bass music in the 170-180bpm range. Gordon has stated that their aim is to provide an open space for diversity on the label.

== Personal life ==
Gordon previously transitioned as a transgender woman, and felt that the rave scene was generally an accepting space for this. They have since described their gender identity as trans non-binary, and uses they/them pronouns.
