= Heartless Crew Presents Crisp Biscuit Vol 1 =

Compilation album by Heartless Crew
- Released: May 2002
- Genre: UK garage, jungle, drum and bass, R&B
- Label: EastWest

Heartless Crew Presents Crisp Biscuit Vol 1 is a compilation album by the Heartless Crew, released in 2002 featuring the MC members of Heartless Crew toasting on several of the tracks.

== Track listing ==
=== Disc: 1 ===
1. Earth, Wind & Fire - "Let's Groove" featuring Specialist Moss, Pickins, Spee, Sweetie Irie, MC Melody, Bushkin, Mighty Moe
2. George Morel - "Morel's Groove" (Morel's Groove Dub)
3. The Ant'ill Mob - "Burning"
4. Big Bird - "Flava"
5. Reel 2 Real - "I Like to Move It"
6. Tina Moore - "Never Gonna Let You Go"
7. Missy Elliott - "Lick Shots"
8. Tables Have Turned - "Tables Have Turned"
9. Pretty Boys - "Brass Pocket"
10. Ice Rider - "Riddim Track"
11. Mr Reds - "Closer"
12. Roy Davis Jr. - "Gabrielle"
13. Pretty Boys - "Sexy Boy"
14. Heartless Crew - "The Heartless Theme"
15. Urban Myths - "Makin' Me Feel"
16. Dave Kelly - "Show Time"
17. DEA - "Circles"
18. Menta - "Sounds of da Future"
19. Smooth - "Undercover Lover"
20. The Jam Experience - "Feel My Love"
21. M-Dubs - "Over You"
22. Donell Jones - "Playa's in the Hood"
23. Jammin - "Hold On"
24. DJ Hatcha - "Bashment"

=== Disc: 2 ===
1. Brandy - "I Wanna Be Down"
2. Shy FX - "Nothing Gonna Stop"
3. Shy FX - "The Message"
4. Origin Unknown - "Truly One"
5. Leftside & Esco - "Double Jeopardy"
6. DJ SS - "MA2"
7. Pascal - "P-Funk"
8. Richard Brownie - "Grass Cyaat"
9. Dope Skills - "6 Million Ways"
10. Andy C - "Roll On"
11. Rohan Fuller - "Rice & Peas Version"
12. Shy FX - "Funkin Dem Up"
13. DJ Hype - "Peace Love & Unity"
14. DJ Stretch & DJ Ride - "Selector"
15. Nate Dogg - "I Got Love"
16. Adina Howard - "Freak" (Jungle Mix)
17. Danny Breaks - "Easy"
18. Tweet - "Oops Oh My"
19. The X - "New Dawn"
20. Shy FX - "Wolf" (Remix)
21. Kang - "Scatter"
22. Sunshine Anderson - "Heard It All Before"
