= Ali G Indahouse Da Soundtrack =

2002 soundtrack album hosted by Ali G

Soundtrack album by Ali G and various artists
- Released: 18 March 2002
- Genre: UK garage; hip hop; grime; 2-step; R&B; reggae
- Label: Universal Island Records
- Producer: Dan Mazer (exec.); Nick Angel (exec.); Sacha Baron Cohen (exec.); Dave Kelly; Shaggy

Sacha Baron Cohen film soundtracks chronology
Ali G Indahouse Da Soundtrack (2002)	Stereophonic Musical Listenings That Have Been Origin in Moving Film "Borat: Cultural Learnings of America for Make Benefit Glorious Nation of Kazakhstan" (2006)

Singles from Ali G Indahouse
- 1. "Me Julie" Released: 11 March 2002

Professional ratings
Review scores
Source	Rating
laut.de	3/5 stars
NME	3.5/5 stars

Ali G Indahouse Da Soundtrack is the soundtrack to 2002 Mark Mylod's film Ali G Indahouse. The enhanced CD was released on 18 March 2002 through Universal Island Records, and consists of a variety of styles of hip hop music. Executively produced by Dan Mazer, Nick Angel and Sacha Baron Cohen, the album features film star Ali G hosting a pirate radio broadcast on his "Drive By FM".

The soundtrack peaked at number 29 in New Zealand, at number 33 in Australia, and at number 49 in the Netherlands. It spawned the only single "Me Julie", which was charted at the top 10 in the UK, Belgium, the Netherlands and Norway.

== Track listing ==
No.	Title	Performer(s)	Length
1.	"Drive By" (Skit)	Ali G	1:18
2.	"Stand Clear"	Adam F & M.O.P.	3:58
3.	"Straight Outta Compton"	N.W.A	4:51
4.	"Incredible"	M-Beat & General Levy	4:05
5.	"Swallow Back" (Skit)	Ali G	0:31
6.	"Me Julie"	Ali G & Shaggy	3:32
7.	"Yo!"	Ali G	1:25
8.	"Dynamite"	Ms. Dynamite	2:58
9.	"Ride wid Us" (AC's Dark Dub Edit)	So Solid Crew	3:50
10.	"Baddest Ruffest" (Radio Edit)	Backyard Dog	3:44
11.	"Oh Yeah"	Foxy Brown & Spragga Benz	4:19
12.	"Put It on Me"	Ja Rule & Vita	4:19
13.	"This Is How We Do It" (Rishi Rich Mix)	Mis-Teeq	4:11
14.	"Freak Me"	Another Level	4:47
15.	"Hold Tight" (Skit)	Ali G	0:10
16.	"E.I."	Nelly	4:04
17.	"Legalise" (Skit)	Ali G	0:28
18.	"Shoot 2 Kill"	Oxide & Neutrino	4:30
19.	"Mad Props" (Skit)	Ali G	0:23
20.	"Fight the Power"	Public Enemy	4:37
21.	"Planet Rock"	Afrika Bambaataa & Soulsonic Force	6:21
22.	"Spread the Love" (Skit)	Ali G	1:12
23.	"Me Julie" (Video)	Ali G & Shaggy

Notes

- Tracks 1, 5, 7, 15, 17, 19 and 22 did not appear in the film.

=== Other songs ===
The following songs did appear in the film but were not released on the soundtrack:

- "One Minute Man", written by Melissa Elliott, Christopher Bridges, Timothy Mosley and David Pomeranz, and performed by Missy Elliott & Ludacris
- "Fresh from Yard", written by Moses Davis, Kimberly Jones, Ernesto Shaw and Ken "Duro" Ifill, and performed by Beenie Man & Lil' Kim
- "We Right Here", written by Earl Simmons and Mickey Davis, and performed by DMX
- "Tease Me", written by John Taylor, Everton Bonner, Joseph Bonner, Lloyd Willis, Sly Dunbar and Robbie Shakespeare, and performed by Chaka Demus & Pliers
- "Three Times a Lady", written by Lionel Richie, and performed by the Commodores
- "Where Are You Baby?", written by Alison Clarkson, and performed by Betty Boo
- "Breakdancing Electric Boogie", written by Joey Robinson and Sylvia Robinson, and performed by West Street Mob
- "Reggae Ambassador", written by William Clark, Michael Cooper, Steven Coore, Richie Daley and Willie Stewart, and performed by Third World
- "This Is How We Do It", written by Montell Barnett, Ricky Walters and Oji Pierce, and performed by Montell Jordan

== Charts ==
Chart (2002)	Peak position
Australian Albums (ARIA)	33
Dutch Albums (Album Top 100)	49
New Zealand Albums (RMNZ)	29
UK Compilation Albums (OCC)	5
UK Soundtrack Albums (OCC)	1
