= Roy Davis =

Roy Davis may refer to:

- Roy B. Davis (1887–1960), American politician from Virginia
- Roy T. Davis (1889–1975), American diplomat
- Roy Elonza Davis (1890–1966), Imperial Wizard of the Original Knights of the Ku Klux Klan
- Peaches Davis (Roy Thomas Davis, 1905–1995), American baseball player
- Roy Eugene Davis (1931–2019), American spiritual teacher and author
- Roy Davis Jr. (fl. 1980s), recording artist specializing in house music
- Roy Davis (writer), comic writer of Wonder Wellies

== See also ==
- Roy Davies (disambiguation)
