= Y2K FM =

England
- Broadcast area: London
- Frequency: 90.6 FM

Programming
- Format: UK garage, jungle music, dancehall, hip-hop

History
- First air date: 2000–2008 as a pirate station

Y2K FM (standing for "Yours 2 Keep") was a Pirate Radio Station based in London. It was known to broadcast a variety of music relating to UK underground music, such as garage music.

It began broadcasting in the early 2000s on the 90.6 frequency modulation which was formerly occupied by Pulse FM.

== History ==
London-based Y2K FM (standing for "Yours 2 Keep") began broadcasting in the early 2000s on the 90.6 frequency modulation which was formerly occupied by Pulse FM (jungle music), Chicago FM (house and garage), Cyndicut FM (drum and bass) and its predecessor Mission FM. The station transmitted from North London as a pirate radio station to inner London city and the Greater London area. They won joint first place for "The Best Radio Station" with Freek FM in the UK Garage Awards 2000, at Camden Palace.

The station played a wide range of UK underground music, with broadcasts primarily covering UK garage music, while also showcasing DJs, MCs and performers from the UK hip-hop, dancehall, and jungle drum and bass scenes. The Heartless Crew also had station airtime, alongside DJ Naughty, Scotti Dee, DJ Tiny, LJ Influence, MC Skanker, DJ Steady, Donae'o, Super Raggo Crew, Outlaws, DJ Pioneer, Tony TNT and Tj and Bass Inject Crew.
