= List of UK R&B Singles Chart number ones of 2002 =

The UK R&B Chart is a weekly chart that ranks the 40 biggest-selling singles and albums that are classified in the R&B genre in the United Kingdom. The chart is compiled by the Official Charts Company, and is based on physical and other physical formats. This is a list of the UK's biggest R&B hits of 2002.

== Number ones ==
Key
| † | Best-selling R&B single of the year |

| Issue date | Single | Artist |
|---|---|---|
| 6 January ^{[a]} | "Gotta Get Thru This" | Daniel Bedingfield |
| 13 January ^{[a]} | "More Than a Woman" | Aaliyah |
| 20 January | "Get the Party Started" | Pink |
| 27 January | "Get the Party Started" | Pink |
| 3 February | "Get the Party Started" | Pink |
| 10 February | "Get the Party Started" | Pink |
| 17 February | "What About Us?" | Brandy |
| 24 February | "The World's Greatest" | R. Kelly |
| 3 March | "Shoulda Woulda Coulda" | Beverley Knight |
| 10 March | "Caramel" | City High featuring Eve |
| 17 March | "Me Julie" | Ali G featuring Shaggy |
| 24 March | "Me Julie" | Ali G featuring Shaggy |
| 31 March | "4 My People" | Missy Elliott featuring Eve |
| 7 April | "4 My People" | Missy Elliott featuring Eve |
| 14 April | "4 My People" | Missy Elliott featuring Eve |
| 21 April | "Girlfriend" | NSYNC featuring Nelly |
| 28 April ^{[a]} | "Freak Lke Me" | The Sugababes |
| 5 May | "Freak Lke Me" | The Sugababes |
| 12 May | "Freak Lke Me" | The Sugababes |
| 19 May | "What's Luv?" | Fat Joe featuring Ashanti |
| 26 May ^{[a]} | "Without Me" | Eminem |
| 2 June | "Without Me" | Eminem |
| 9 June | "Without Me" | Eminem |
| 16 June | "Without Me" | Eminem |
| 23 June | "Hot in Herre" | Nelly |
| 30 June | "Hot in Herre" | Nelly |
| 7 July | "I'm Gonna Be Alright" | Jennifer Lopez featuring Nas |
| 14 July | "Foolish" | Ashanti |
| 21 July | "Foolish" | Ashanti |
| 28 July | "Livin' It Up" | Ja Rule featuring Case |
| 4 August | "Black Suits Comin' (Nod Ya Head)" | Will Smith Introducing Trā-Knox |
| 11 August | "Oh Boy" | Cam'ron |
| 18 August | "Rainy Dayz" | Mary J Blige |
| 25 August | "Addictive" | Truth Hurts featuring Rakim |
| 1 September | "Addictive" | Truth Hurts featuring Rakim |
| 8 September | "Addictive" | Truth Hurts featuring Rakim |
| 15 September | "Nothin'" | N.O.R.E. |
| 22 September | "Cleanin' Out My Closet" | Eminem |
| 29 September | "Gangsta Lovin'" | Eve featuring Alicia Keys |
| 6 October | "Down 4 U" | Irv Gotti featuring Ja Rule, Ashanti, Vita and Charli Baltimore |
| 13 October | "Down 4 U" | Irv Gotti featuring Ja Rule, Ashanti, Vita and Charli Baltimore |
| 20 October ^{[a]} | "Dilemma" † | Nelly featuring Kelly Rowland |
| 27 October ^{[a]} | "Dilemma" † | Nelly featuring Kelly Rowland |
| 3 November | "Dilemma" † | Nelly featuring Kelly Rowland |
| 10 November | "Dilemma" † | Nelly featuring Kelly Rowland |
| 17 November ^{[a]} | "Dirrty" | Christina Aguilera featuring Redman |
| 24 November ^{[a]} | "Dirrty" | Christina Aguilera featuring Redman |
| 1 December | "Dirrty" | Christina Aguilera featuring Redman |
| 8 December ^{[a]} | "Lose Yourself" | Eminem |
| 15 December | "Lose Yourself" | Eminem |
| 22 December | "Lose Yourself" | Eminem |
| 29 December | "Lose Yourself" | Eminem |

== Notes ==
- ^{a} - The single was simultaneously number one on the UK Singles Chart.

== See also ==
- List of UK Dance Singles Chart number ones of 2002
- List of UK Independent Singles Chart number ones of 2002
- List of UK Rock & Metal Singles Chart number ones of 2002
- List of UK R&B Albums Chart number ones of 2002
