= Alright (Jamiroquai song) =

1997 single by Jamiroquai

Single by Jamiroquai

from the album Travelling Without Moving
- Released: 28 April 1997
- Genre: Disco; funk
- Length: 4:25 (album version); 3:39 (radio edit)
- Label: Sony Soho Square
- Songwriters: Jay Kay; Toby Smith
- Producers: Jay Kay; Al Stone

Jamiroquai singles chronology
"Cosmic Girl" (1996)	"Alright" (1997)	"High Times" (1997)

Audio sample
- file; help

Music video
- "Alright" on YouTube

"Alright" is a song by British funk and acid jazz band Jamiroquai, released as the third single from their third studio album, Travelling Without Moving (1996). The song, written by Jamiroquai, contains samples from Eddie Harris' "It's All Right Now" and Idris Muhammad's "Could Heaven Ever Be Like This". "Alright" was released on 28 April 1997 via Sony Soho Square in the United Kingdom, peaking at number six on the UK Singles Chart and at number two in Iceland. It is the group's only single to chart on the US Billboard Hot 100, peaking at number 78. The music video, directed by Vaughan Arnell, features the band performing the song at a party.

== Critical reception ==
Shaun Carney from The Age stated that "speedier workouts" such as 'Alright' "succeed". J.D. Considine from The Baltimore Sun commented, "So when the bassline in 'Alright' slips into a pattern reminiscent of the Yarbrough and Peoples oldie 'Don't Stop the Music', the reference comes across less as theft than as a "gosh, that sounds familiar" reminder. Obviously, credit for some of that belongs with the band itself, which clearly has enough ideas of its own not to need to borrow." Paul Verna of Billboard magazine named 'Alright' a highlight of the album, describing it as "upbeat". Dennis Kelly from The Morning Call felt the band's "mimicking of '70s disco, funk, soul and jazz fusion is well executed" on tracks like 'Alright'.

A reviewer from Music Week gave it four out of five, constating that "with its delicious retro funky grooves and pleasing chorus, this latest gem from Travelling Without Moving will land Jay Kay and co with one of their biggest hits to date." Ted Kessler from NME declared it as a "bittersweet" gem, with Kay's "fairy-lit disco". He added further that We'll spend the night together/Wake up and live forever is "the epitome of Jay's romantic lyrical vision." Sam Taylor from The Observer remarked its "effortless swank". Aidin Viziri from Salon said the singer "keeps the party alive with unbridled enthusiasm" exploring lust.

== Music video ==
The accompanying music video for "Alright" was directed by British director Vaughan Arnell, and takes place at a luxury party. Jay Kay is filmed singing in an elevator with the rest of Jamiroquai. Then, they perform the song, and at the end of the clip, the crowd were singing the chorus taken from live footage in Argentina. The video starts as a sequel of "Cosmic Girl", with Jamiroquai appearing in sports cars, and Kay was driving the same Lamborghini while parking it at the entrance of the party.

== Legacy ==
In a 2016 retrospective review, Justin Chadwick from Albumism named 'Alright' the "strongest song" on Travelling Without Moving, describing it as "headnod-inducing" and a "bass-fueled reverie that celebrates the myriad possibilities of newfound love", with a "refreshingly optimistic" Jay Kay proclaiming to the object of his affection". He added, "Without question, it's still my personal favorite, not just from Travelling, but across the band's entire recorded repertoire." In 2017, Billboard magazine ranked it number 73 in their list of "The 100 Greatest Pop Songs of 1997". Billboard editor Andrew Unterberger wrote, "Sure, 'Virtual Insanity' is the Jamiroquai hit people remember, but that's 80% because of the brilliant domestic suffocation and dope-ass choreography of the music video; real Jay Kay heads know that the disco-funk of follow-up single 'Alright' was really where it's at. Sadly, the song's popping bass and squelching synths got it stuck somewhere in between Top 40 and alternative radio at the time; a half-decade later, it would prove the falsetto-laden model for any number of watered-down Maroon 5 smashes."

== Track listings ==
- UK CD1
1. "Alright" (radio edit) – 3:40
2. "Alright" (version – vocal) – 6:04
3. "Alright" (dub – vocal) – 5:34
4. "Alright" (D.J. – Version Excursion) – 6:47
- UK CD2
1. "Alright" (full-length version) – 4:23
2. "Alright" (Tee's in House Mix) – 7:20
3. "Alright" (Tee's Digital Club) – 7:15
4. "Alright" (Tee's Radio Jay) – 3:27
- 2006 digital EP
1. "Alright" (Fred Falke & Alan Braxe Remix) – 6:10
2. "Alright" (Todd Terry's in House Remix) – 7:20

== Charts ==
=== Weekly charts ===
Chart (1997)	Peak position
Australia (ARIA)	84
Belgium (Ultratip Bubbling Under Flanders)	8
Belgium (Ultratop 50 Wallonia)	38
Canada Dance/Urban (RPM)	13
Europe (Eurochart Hot 100)	35
Finland (Suomen virallinen lista)	13
Germany (GfK)	98
Iceland (Íslenski Listinn Topp 40)	2
Italy (Musica e dischi)	6
Italy Airplay (Music & Media)	6
Scottish Singles Sales (Official Charts)	8
UK Singles (Official Charts)	6
UK Dance (Official Charts)	3
UK Hip Hop/R&B (Official Charts)	1
UK Club Chart (Music Week)	1
US Billboard Hot 100	78
US Dance Club Songs (Billboard)	7
US Dance Singles Sales (Billboard)	39
US Hot R&B/Hip-Hop Songs (Billboard)	84

=== Year-end charts ===
Chart (1997)	Position
Iceland (Íslenski Listinn Topp 40)	24
Italy (Musica e dischi)	74
UK Club Chart (Music Week)	25

== Release history ==
Region	Date	Format(s)	Label(s)	Ref.
United Kingdom	28 April 1997	12-inch vinyl; CD	Sony Soho Square	
Japan	28 May 1997	CD	Epic	
United States	21 July 1997	Alternative radio	Work	
