= Me Julie =

2002 single by Ali G

Single by Ali G and Shaggy

from the album Ali G Indahouse Da Soundtrack
- Released: 11 March 2002
- Studio: The Box
- Length: 3:34
- Label: Island
- Songwriters: Orville Richard Burrell; Dave Kelly; Sacha Baron Cohen; Dan Mazer
- Producers: Dave Kelly; Orville Richard Burrell

Shaggy singles chronology
"Dance & Shout / Hope" (2001)	"Me Julie" (2002)	"Hey Sexy Lady" (2002)

Official audio
- "Me Julie" on YouTube

"Me Julie" is a song by British comedian Sacha Baron Cohen (performing as his Ali G character) and Jamaican musician Shaggy, released as a single from the soundtrack to the 2002 film Ali G Indahouse. The single was written in reference to the love interest in the film, Julie. "Me Julie" peaked at number two on the UK Singles Chart and sold 200,000 copies in the United Kingdom, as stated by the British Phonographic Industry (BPI).

== Track listings ==
UK and Australasian CD single

1. "Me Julie"
2. "Me Julie" (Big League remix)
3. "Me Julie" (instrumental)

UK 12-inch and cassette single; European CD single

1. "Me Julie"
2. "Me Julie" (Big League remix)

== Credits and personnel ==
Credits are lifted from the UK CD single liner notes.

Studios

- Recorded at The Box
- Mixed at Big Yard Studios (New York City)

Personnel

- Orville Richard Burrell (Shaggy) – writing, production
- Dave Kelly – writing, production, recording
- Sacha Baron Cohen – writing
- Dan Mazer – writing
- Sting International – mixing
- Robert Livingston – mixing

== Charts ==
=== Weekly charts ===
Chart (2002)	Peak position
Australia (ARIA)	13
Australian Urban (ARIA)	8
Austria (Ö3 Austria Top 40)	11
Belgium (Ultratop 50 Flanders)	3
Belgium (Ultratop 50 Wallonia)	39
Denmark (Tracklisten)	13
Europe (Eurochart Hot 100)	14
France (SNEP)	71
Germany (GfK)	12
Ireland (IRMA)	6
Netherlands (Dutch Top 40)	5
Netherlands (Single Top 100)	6
New Zealand (Recorded Music NZ)	37
Norway (VG-lista)	6
Scottish Singles Sales (Official Charts)	4
Switzerland (Schweizer Hitparade)	33
UK Singles (Official Charts)	2
UK Hip Hop/R&B (Official Charts)	1

=== Year-end charts ===
Chart (2002)	Position
Belgium (Ultratop 50 Flanders)	26
Europe (Eurochart Hot 100)	85
Ireland (IRMA)	48
Netherlands (Dutch Top 40)	67
Netherlands (Single Top 100)	45
UK Singles (OCC)	20

== Certifications ==
Region	Certification	Certified units/sales
Australia (ARIA)	Gold	35,000^{^}
United Kingdom (BPI)	Silver	200,000^{^}
^{^} Shipments figures based on certification alone.

== Release history ==
Region	Date	Format(s)	Label(s)	Ref.
United Kingdom	11 March 2002	12-inch vinyl; CD; cassette	Island	
Australia	20 May 2002	CD	Island	

== See also ==
- List of UK R&B Singles Chart number ones of 2002
