= Roy Davies =

Roy Davies may refer to:

- Roy Davies (bishop) (1934–2013), Bishop of Llandaff 1985–99
- Roy Davies (cricketer) (1928–2013), Welsh cricketer
- Roy Davies (soccer) (1924–73), South African football player
- R. W. Davies (1925–2021), British Sovietologist
- Roy W. Davies (1942–1977), British classicist

== See also ==
- Roy Davis (disambiguation)
