= High Times (song) =

1997 single by Jamiroquai

- UK 12-inch single artwork

Single by Jamiroquai

from the album Travelling Without Moving
- Released: 1 December 1997
- Length: 6:00 (album version); 4:08 (radio edit)
- Label: Sony Soho Square
- Songwriters: Jay Kay; Toby Smith; Stuart Zender; Derrick McKenzie
- Producer: Rick Pope

Jamiroquai singles chronology
"Alright" (1997)	"High Times" (1997)	"Deeper Underground" (1998)

Music video
- "High Times" on YouTube

"High Times" is a song by British funk and acid jazz band Jamiroquai, released as the fourth and final single from their third studio album, Travelling Without Moving (1996). Issued on 1 December 1997, the song peaked at number 20 on the UK Singles Chart and reached the top 10 on both the US and Canadian dance charts.

== Background ==
The song was written by Jason Kay. It opens with the line, "You don't need a name in bright lights, you're a rock star. In some tinfoil, with a glass pipe, is your guitar," a reference to crack cocaine. While cocaine and other drugs are mentioned negatively throughout the song, the chorus primarily addresses jet lag: "Last night, turned to daylight, and a minute became a day," describing the desynchronosis often experienced during world tours.

The radio edit is often criticized by fans for its poor editing, featuring abrupt cuts and truncated words, such as the word "this" from the line "This twisted, crystal kingdom." This edited version was included on the band's greatest hits compilation, High Times: Singles 1992-2006. Some releases of Travelling Without Moving omit the "Last Night Changed It All" sample, written by Joe Wheeler and performed by Esther Williams.

== Critical reception ==
Larry Flick of Billboard wrote, "If you're a fan Jamiroquai's recent MTV hits, ya ain't heard nothin' yet. 'High Times' shows the band at its funky best. The track jiggles with a classic soul sound, juiced with enough electronic flavor to keep it from sounding quaint. Frontman Jay Kay has perfected his Stevie Wonder inflections while also honing an individual style that demands to be heard in a live setting."

== Music video ==
The accompanying music video is filmed in a documentary style by the band's manager during their Latin American tour. It features candid scenes of the band arriving at airports, relaxing in their hotel rooms watching television, and performing at live shows. Throughout the video, lead singer Jay Kay wears various national football shirts, including those of Chile and Brazil. The video's conclusion was censored in some countries for its depiction of cannabis use.

== Track listings ==
- UK CD single
1. "High Times" (radio edit) – 4:08
2. "High Times" (Bionic Supachronic mix) – 8:38
3. "High Times" (Doobie dub) – 6:46
4. "High Times" (album version) – 5:57
- UK 12-inch single
1. "High Times" (Bionic Supachronic mix) – 8:38
2. "High Times" (Jamiroquai mix) – 4:00
3. "High Times" (Doobie dub) – 6:46
4. "High Times" (Jamiroquai dub) – 5:30

== Charts ==
=== Weekly charts ===
Chart (1997–1998)	Peak position
Canada Dance/Urban (RPM)	9
Europe (Eurochart Hot 100)	55
Iceland (Íslenski Listinn Topp 40)	19
Scottish Singles Sales (Official Charts)	23
UK Singles (Official Charts)	20
UK Dance (Official Charts)	5
UK Hip Hop/R&B (Official Charts)	4
UK Club Chart (Music Week)	1
US Dance Club Songs (Billboard)	9

=== Year-end charts ===
Chart (1997)	Position
UK Club Chart (Music Week)	44
