= Gabriel (Roy Davis Jr. song) =

Single by Roy Davis Jr. and Peven Everett
- Released: 1996 (U.S.); October 1997 (UK)
- Genre: Garage; house
- Label: Large; XL
- Songwriters: Roy Davis Jr.; Peven Everett
- Producers: Roy Davis Jr.; Peven Everett

Roy Davis Jr. singles chronology
| "House Inferno" (1995) | "Gabriel" (1996) | "This Is for You" (1996) |

"Gabriel" is a song by American electronic musician Roy Davis Jr. and Peven Everett, first released in the US in 1996 on Large Records, titled "Gabrielle". It originally states on the record that the track was produced by Davis Jr., with Everett providing vocals and performing trumpet on the song.

In 1997, UK label XL Recordings licensed and released "Gabriel" with Peven Everett credited as a 'featured artist'. On this release, both Davis Jr. and Everett are credited as having written and produced the song, with Everett also credited as having provided lead and backing vocals, as well as having performed trumpet and keyboards. The XL release featured more mixes of the track by UK duos Basement Jaxx and R.I.P. Productions as well as a mix by M-Beat on the CD single.

The song was Single of the Week in NME. It peaked at number 22 on the UK Singles Chart and remained on the chart for five weeks. It also reached No. 5 on the UK Dance Singles Chart.

== Impact and legacy ==
In November 2016, UK duo Gorgon City compiled a list of their top UK garage songs for Billboard magazine, with "Gabriel" at number 26. The Guardian listed the song at number three in their list of "The Best UK Garage Tracks - Ranked!" in 2019. In December 2017 for Dummy Mag, UK duo Original Dodger, formerly known as Artful Dodger, included "Gabriel" in their list of the "10 Best UK Garage Tracks" and in March 2019, the Heartless Crew included "Gabriel" in their list of the "10 Best UK Garage Tunes". Mixmag included "Gabriel" in their list of "40 of the Best UK Garage Tracks Released from 1995 to 2005", and in their list of "16 of the Best Uplifting Vocal Garage Tracks". Capital Xtra included the song in their list of "The Best Old-School Garage Anthems of All Time". Gemtracks included the song in their list of the "Top UK Garage Songs Between 1995–2005". In July 2022, Rolling Stone ranked it number 122 in their list of "200 Greatest Dance Songs of All Time".

== Remixes and covers ==
A 2-step remix was released in 2000 by Mike Millrain (under the alias Large Joints) on the Locked On compilation Sound of the Pirates.

Sampha covered the song in BBC Radio 1xtra's Live Lounge session in 2017.

In 2019, DJ Spoony together with Katie Chatburn and the Ignition Orchestra featuring Lifford on vocals recorded an orchestral version of the song for the UK garage covers album Garage Classical.

== Track listings ==
- US 12" (1996)

A1. "Gabrielle" (The Scroll Mix)
A2. "Gabrielle" (Tamborine Dub)
B1. "Gabrielle" (Words to Give By)
B2. "Gabrielle" (Live Garage)

- UK 12" (1997)

A1. "Gabriel" (Live Garage Version) - 7:24
A2. "Gabriel" (Basement Jaxx Mix) - 7:42
B1. "Gabriel" (R.I.P. Mix) - 6:36
B2. "Gabriel" (Victor Imbres Mix) - 8:11

- UK CD single (1997)
1. "Gabriel" (Live Garage Edit) - 3:53
2. "Gabriel" (M-Beat Edit) - 3:58
3. "Gabriel" (Path to Heaven Mix) - 7:52
4. "Gabriel" (Live Garage Version) - 7:24
5. "Gabriel" (M-Beat Mix) - 4:56
- UK CD2 single "Gabriel Remixes" (1997)
1. "Gabriel" (Basement Jaxx Mix) - 7:42
2. "Gabriel" (R.I.P. Mix) - 6:36
3. "Gabriel" (Victor Imbres Mix) - 8:10
4. "Gabriel" (Jaxx Nite Beats) - 6:08

== Certifications ==
| Region | Certification | Certified units/sales |
|---|---|---|
| United Kingdom (BPI) | Gold | 400,000^{‡} |
^{‡} Sales+streaming figures based on certification alone.
