= Travelling Without Moving =

Studio album by Jamiroquai
- Released: 28 August 1996
- Studios: Great Linford Manor (Milton Keynes, England)
- Genres: Funk; acid jazz; R&B; soul; disco; dance
- Length: 67:22
- Labels: Sony Soho Square (UK); Work (US); Columbia (Canada); Epic (Japan)
- Producers: Jason Kay; Al Stone

Jamiroquai chronology
Jay's Selection (1996)	Travelling Without Moving (1996)	In-Store Jam (1997)

Jamiroquai studio album chronology
The Return of the Space Cowboy (1994)	Travelling Without Moving (1996)	Synkronized (1999)

Singles from Travelling Without Moving
- 1. "Do U Know Where You're Coming From" Released: 20 May 1996; 2. "Virtual Insanity" Released: 19 August 1996; 3. "Cosmic Girl" Released: 25 November 1996; 4. "Alright" Released: 28 April 1997; 5. "High Times" Released: 1 December 1997

Travelling Without Moving is the third studio album by English funk and acid jazz band Jamiroquai, released on 28 August 1996 in Japan, then on 9 September 1996 in the United Kingdom under Sony Soho Square. Front-man Jay Kay intended for the album to have a more universal style, revolving around "cars, life and love". Critics have generally praised the album for being more focused and refined than the band's previous work, while others panned its lyrics and found the album too derivative. Its visual concept of sports cars received backlash from press, as it contradicted Kay's professed environmental beliefs.

The album was Jamiroquai's American breakthrough. It marked the band's first entry in the US Billboard 200 chart at number 24. In the UK, it peaked at number two. Its singles "Virtual Insanity", "Cosmic Girl" and "Alright" entered the top-ten in the UK singles chart. In the US, "Alright" entered the Billboard Hot 100 at number 78, while "Cosmic Girl" and "High Times" were in the top-ten in the Dance Club Songs charts. The music video for "Virtual Insanity" contributed to the album's success. Travelling Without Moving sold over 8 million copies worldwide, holding the Guinness World Records as the best-selling funk album in history. The album was reissued in 2013 in remastered form with bonus material.

== Background ==
After experiencing a stressful period while recording The Return of the Space Cowboy, Kay sought to make the next album more focused and universal. He also did not want to remain as a semi-underground act "that stuck to its little niche and sold one and a half million albums every time. I wanted to breakout and be something bigger, more international." Speaking of the album's general mood, Kay said: "[With Emergency on Planet Earth], people weren't cheering in the streets or anything, and [The Return of the Space Cowboy] was quite sad. With [Travelling Without Moving], I decided it was important to show people we could enjoy ourselves. That's why it's cars, life and love". Kay booked the band into the residential studio Great Linford Manor so that they could work at their own pace.

== Composition ==
The first song composed for the album was "Virtual Insanity". It was recorded as a rough demo and was not fully realised until the album's final recording stage. The song has a piano opening with "buoyant keyboards and soaring strings." Its lyrics are about the prevalence of technology and the replication and simulation of life. The second track "Cosmic Girl" is a disco song with "spacey" lyrics, based on rhythmic "looped beats" "to give it an off-center, otherworldly" sound. For the next track "Use The Force" the group channels "that real vintage football vibe", filled with horns, wah-wah guitar and a rippling barrage of Latin percussion". The fourth track "Everyday" is described "as seductive as any Maxwell ballad" and has "over aching strings and a come-hither bass line". The fifth song, "Alright", was described as an "easy-going disco-funk" track.

"High Times", a song with "razor-edged funky guitars", references Kay's drug use during the recording of The Return of the Space Cowboy: "'High Times' was admitting the truth of the matter, of where I'd been and how lucky I was to be coming out of the other side." This is followed by the reggae track, "Drifting Along". The tracks "Didjerama" and "Didjital Vibrations" are instrumental tracks containing ambient didgeridoo. The title track is next on the album and samples Kay's purple Lamborghini in the intro. It features a "driving groove" and after two minutes, it "transitions into a bassline-paced, heavy workout". The album ends with the dance track, "You Are My Love", and the soul ballad, "Spend a Lifetime".

== Release ==
Travelling Without Moving was first released on 28 August 1996 in Japan, then on 9 September 1996 in the United Kingdom on Sony Soho Square. Released on the Work record label in January 1997, it was the band's first US Billboard 200 entry, where it reached number 24 and it sold 1,400,000 shipments. The album peaked at number 2 in the UK chart and sold 1,219,197 copies. In Japan, it reached number 6, and in the year end chart there, it ranked number 87 in 1996 and number 58 in 1997. It peaked at number 2 in the French SNEP albums chart and number 6 in the year end chart in 1996. In Switzerland, it reached number 3 in the Swiss Albums Chart, and number 37 in the year end chart in 1996. It ranked number 9 in the German Media Control Albums Chart, and It ranked at number 69 in 1996 and number 38 in 1997 in the German year-end chart. In the Netherlands, in peaked at 16 in the album chart, and number 48 in the year end chart in 1997. In the Australian ARIA Albums Chart, it ranked at 6 and in 1997 47 at the end of the year. The album was certified platinum in these countries, except in Germany where it was certified gold. It was also triple platinum in Europe by the IFPI denoting sales of 3,000,000 copies. The album has overall sold more than 8 million copies worldwide. In 2013, Travelling Without Moving was one of the first three albums to be re-issued on the band's 20th anniversary campaign, also containing a bonus disc of remixes, demos, live performances and B-sides.

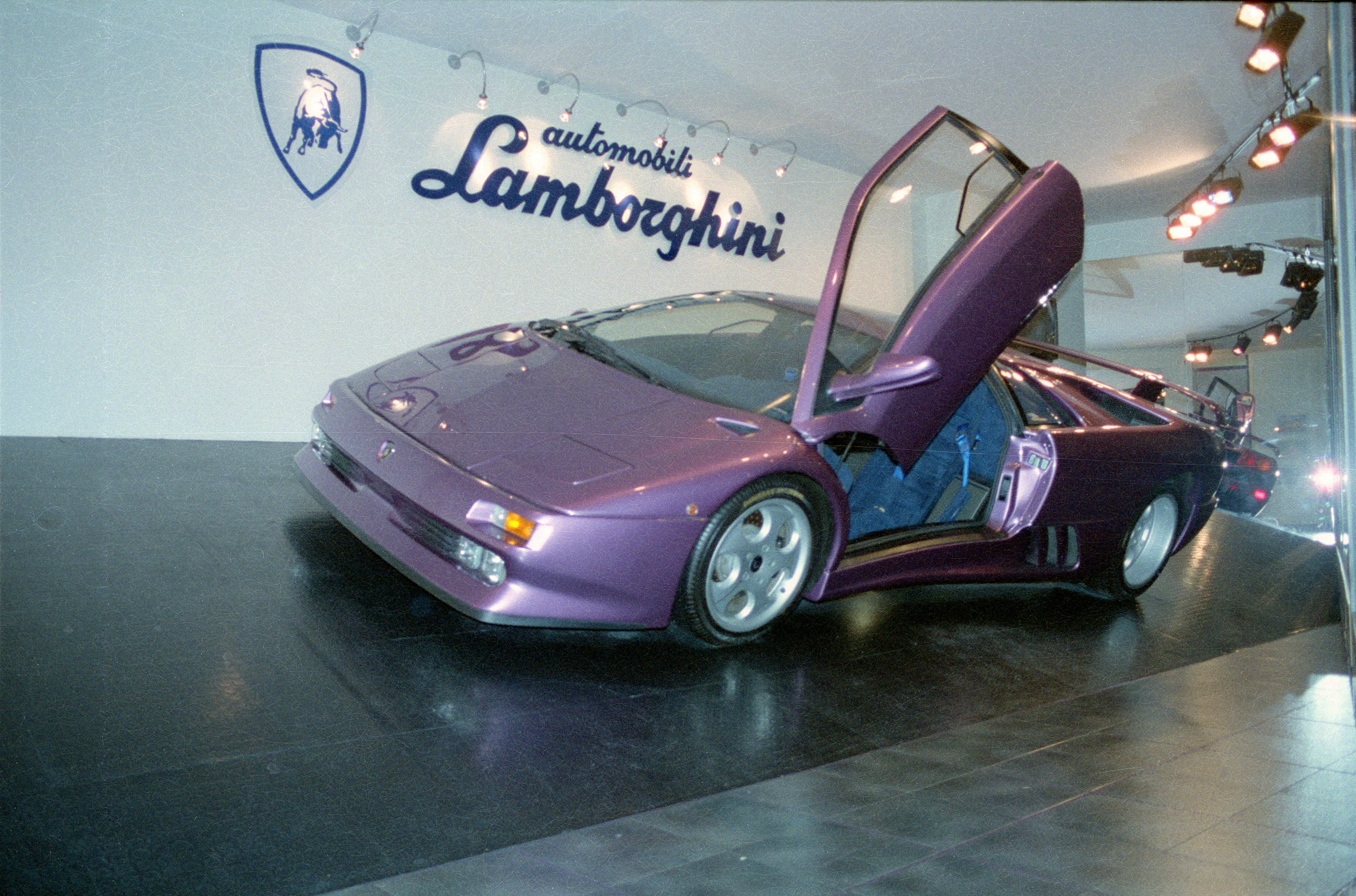
A purple Lamborghini Diablo SE30, similar to the one featured in the "Cosmic Girl" music video

"Do U Know Where You're Coming From" was the first single to be released on 20 May 1996, where it peaked at number 12 in the UK. It is a drum and bass song by M-Beat which features vocals by Kay. The second single "Virtual Insanity" was released on 19 August 1996, reached number 3 in the single and number 1 the R&B charts in the UK. Its music video, directed by Jonathan Glazer, played heavily on MTV, which depicted Kay "perform[ing] in a room where the floors, walls and furniture all moved simultaneously.""Cosmic Girl" was released as its third single on 20 November 1996, reaching number 6 in the UK and number 7 in the US Dance Club Songs charts. Its music video features a Ferrari F355 Berlinetta, a red Ferrari F40 and a purple Lamborghini Diablo SE30 "on mountain roads and across a desert." "Alright" was issued on 28 April 1997, ranking number 6 in the UK and number 78 in their only Billboard Hot 100 appearance. "High Times" was the final single, released on 1 December 1997, and peaked at number 9 the US Dance Club charts.

=== Controversy ===
After the album was released, Kay received backlash from the press for his interest in sports cars, because it contradicted his environmental beliefs on Emergency on Planet Earth. The album's visual concept revolved around sports cars, with the Ferrari logo being recreated within the band's Buffalo Man logo. Paper magazine also pointed out this contradiction with the music video for "Alright", writing "when Kay rolls up in his purple Lamborghini to party on the dance floor with a bevy of bodacious babes, concerns about seals, whales, rain forests and the revolution are checked at the door." He said that he was hesitant to release the album as he expected the backlash, but added "Just because I love to drive a fast car, that doesn't mean I believe in chopping trees down. It doesn't mean I think they should build more roads for my car". Keyboardist Toby Smith also said, "We all want to be an ecologically conscious band, but we like cars [...] We're hypocrites like the rest of the world. But then again, you can only drive one car at a time."

== Reception ==
"Even when the band seems to be playing off an existing hit, it doesn't borrow the past so much as jog the listener's memory. So when the bassline in "Alright" slips into a pattern reminiscent of the Yarbrough and Peoples oldie "Don't Stop the Music," the reference comes across less as theft than as a 'gosh, that sounds familiar' reminder."

— J.D. Considine, 1997

Professional ratings
Review scores
Source	Rating
AllMusic	4/5 stars
Encyclopedia of Popular Music	4/5 stars
Entertainment Weekly	C+
The Guardian	3/5 stars
Music Week	5/5 stars
NME	6/10
Pitchfork	7.2/10
Q	4/5 stars
The Rolling Stone Album Guide	2.5/5 stars
Uncut	6/10

Critics have generally praised Travelling Without Moving for its focused and refined sound, as it deepened the acid-jazz and soul styles that were informed from their first two albums. Linton Chiswick of Q magazine said that this resulted in "a fat, squishy disco feel." Parry Gettelman also wrote that Kay had "evolved into quite a writer." The Source also gave the album 4 out of 5: "Travelling is essentially about the metaphysics of having a good time... Jamiroquai have a thousand musical tricks up their sleeves; edgy horns laced with jazz intricacies, energetic bass lines and disco rhythms, and a wider variety of tempos than usual in British funk." Tom Moon remarked that: "There are no digital samples on Traveling Without Moving. In fact, just about every sound comes from a vintage analog instrument."

Stephen Thompson of The A.V. Club said that the album "sounds an awful lot like its predecessor", but he concluded: "It's a tribute to Jamiroquai that more of the same still sounds pretty damned good." A Music Week reviewer wrote: "Jamiroquai still wear their influences firmly on their sleeve but this is their most accomplished and satisfying offering yet." Matt Diehl of Entertainment Weekly writes, "when it comes to Stevie Wonder, frontman Jason Kay still gets imitation confused with homage." In a 2004 discography review by Ben Sisario, Travelling Without Moving is the only Jamiroquai album rated slightly higher than others, with Sisario singling out "Virtual Insanity" and "Cosmic Girl" for being radio-friendly, but criticising the album's use of the didgeridoo. David Bennun of Muzik considered it "tepid funk" in an unfavorable review. The album's lyrics have also been criticised, with Matt Diehl writing they "ultimately strip away the soul."

=== Accolades ===
Their music video for "Virtual Insanity" won Video of the Year and Breakthrough Video at the Video Music Awards; additionally, it won Alternative/Modern Rock Clip of the Year and the Maximum Vision at the Billboard Music Awards. The song also earned the band a Grammy Award for Best Performance by a Duo Or Group and the album was nominated for Best Pop Vocal Album. Travelling Without Moving has won three best album awards at the MOBO and Japan Gold Disc Awards in 1997, and at the Hungarian Music Awards in 1998. Pause & Play ranked the album at number 11 in The 90s Top 100 Essential Albums in 1999. Vibe called Travelling Without Moving "the most infectious dance record since the 70's disco revolution", and ranked it at number 42 in its 2013 list The 50 Greatest Albums Since '93.

== Legacy ==
The high album sales of Travelling Without Moving earned the band a Guinness World Record for the best-selling funk album in history. Paul Sexton of Billboard magazine credits this period of Jamiroquai as their American breakthrough: "Long a European success story for the Sony S2 label, the group once accused of being a mere Stevie Wonder soundalike has grown into its own style and added a substantial American audience in the process." However, the band were unable to replicate their success in America since then. The music video of "Virtual Insanity" was described as "one of the most famous music videos ever", making them "icons of the music-video format", according to Spencer Kornhaber from The Atlantic. The song also led to the climax of "1970s soul and funk that early acid jazz artists had initiated", according to writer Kennith Prouty. The Lamborghini Diablo SE30 was also considered a "Nineties icon" in part of the "Cosmic Girl" music video, according to The Daily Telegraph.

== Track listing ==
Standard edition^{[a]}
No.	Title	Writer(s)	Length
1.	"Virtual Insanity"	Jay Kay; Toby Smith	5:40
2.	"Cosmic Girl"	Kay; Derrick McKenzie	4:03
3.	"Use the Force"	Kay; Smith; McKenzie; Sola Akingbola	4:00
4.	"Everyday"	Kay; Smith; Stuart Zender	4:28
5.	"Alright"	Kay; Smith	4:25
6.	"High Times"	Kay; Smith; McKenzie; Zender	5:58
7.	"Drifting Along"	Kay; McKenzie; Simon Katz; Zender	4:06
8.	"Didjerama" (Instrumental)	Kay; Wallis Buchanan; McKenzie; Zender	3:50
9.	"Didjital Vibrations" (Instrumental)	Kay; Buchanan; Zender	5:49
10.	"Travelling Without Moving"	Kay	3:40
11.	"You Are My Love"	Kay	3:55
12.	"Spend a Lifetime"	Kay; Smith	4:14
13.	"Do You Know Where You're Coming From" (M-Beat featuring Jamiroquai, bonus track)	Kay; Smith; M-Beat	5:02
14.	"Funktion" (Hidden track)	Kay; Smith; Buchanan; McKenzie; Zender; David Paich; David Foster; Cheryl Lynn	8:28
Total length:			67:07

Australian bonus disc: "Alright" Remixes EP
No.	Title	Length
1.	"Alright" (Radio Mix)
2.	"Alright" (Tee's Radio Jay)
3.	"Alright" (Tee's in House Mix)
4.	"Alright" (DJ Version Excursion)
5.	"Alright" (Tee's Digital Club)
6.	"Alright" (D&C Human Mix)
7.	"Alright" (D&C Electro Groove Mix)

Australian bonus remix disc
No.	Title	Writer(s)	Length
1.	"Virtual Insanity" (Single Edit)	Kay; Smith	4:07
2.	"Virtual Insanity" (Unreality Mix)	Kay; Smith	3:57
3.	"High Times" (Sanchez Radio Edit)	Kay; Smith; Zender; McKenzie; Wheeler	3:53
4.	"Space Cowboy" (Classic Club)	Kay	7:51
5.	"Alright" (Tee's in House Mix)	Kay; Smith; Harris	7:20
6.	"Cosmic Girl" (Classic Mix)	Kay; McKenzie	9:23
Total length:			36:29

20th anniversary reissue bonus disc
No.	Title	Writer(s)	Length
1.	"Virtual Insanity" (Salaam Remi Remix)	Kay; Smith
2.	"Cosmic Girl" (Quasar Mix)	Kay; McKenzie
3.	"Alright" (Alan Braxe and Fred Falke Remix)	Kay; Smith
4.	"High Times" (Sanchez Radio Edit)	Kay; Smith; Zender; McKenzie
5.	"Do U Know Where You're Coming From"	Kay; Smith; M-Beat
6.	"Bullet"	Kay
7.	"Slipin' N' Slidin'"	Kay; McKenzie
8.	"Hollywood Swinging" (Live on the Chicago Riviera)	Robert "Kool" Bell; Ronald Bell; George M. Brown; Robert "Spike" Mickens; Claydes Charles Smith; Dennis R. Thomas; Rick A. Westfield
9.	"Alright" (Live at the Verona Amphitheatre)	Kay; Smith
10.	"Virtual Insanity" (Live at the Verona Amphitheatre)	Kay; Smith

25th anniversary reissue bonus track
No.	Title	Length
15.	"Cosmic Girl" (Dimitri from Paris Remix Radio Edit)	4:28
Total length:		72:06

30th anniversary reissue
No.	Title	Writer(s)	Length
1.	"Virtual Insanity"	Kay; Smith	5:40
2.	"Cosmic Girl"	Kay; McKenzie	4:03
3.	"Use the Force"	Kay; Smith; McKenzie; Akingbola	4:00
4.	"Everyday"	Kay; Smith; Zender	4:28
5.	"Alright"	Kay; Smith	4:25
6.	"High Times"	Kay; Smith; McKenzie; Zender	5:58
7.	"Drifting Along"	Kay; McKenzie; Katz; Zender	4:06
8.	"Didjerama"	Kay; Buchanan; McKenzie; Zender	3:50
9.	"Didjital Vibrations"	Kay; Buchanan; Zender	5:49
10.	"Travelling Without Moving"	Kay	3:40
11.	"You Are My Love"	Kay	3:55
12.	"Spend a Lifetime"	Kay; Smith	4:14
13.	"Do You Know Where You're Coming From" (with M-Beat)	Kay; Smith; M-Beat	5:02
14.	"Funktion" (Ruff Mix)	Kay; Smith; Buchanan; McKenzie; Zender; Paich; Foster; Lynn	8:28
15.	"Cosmic Girl" (Dimitri from Paris Remix Radio Edit)	Kay; McKenzie	4:28
Total length:			72:06

=== Notes ===
- ^a Some editions contain either "Do U Know Where You're Coming From" or "Funktion" as a bonus track. Others have both tracks.

== Personnel ==
Credits adapted from album liner notes.

Jamiroquai

- Jay Kay – vocals
- Toby Smith – keyboards
- Stuart Zender – bass
- Simon Katz – guitar
- Derrick McKenzie – drums
- Wallis Buchanan – didgeridoo
- Sola Akingbola – percussion

Additional musicians

- DJ D-Zire – turntables
- Simon Hale – string arrangements and conductor
- Gavyn Wright and the London Philharmonic Orchestra – strings
- Max Beesley – vibraphone (Funktion)
- Gary Barnacle – saxophone
- John Thirkell – trumpet
- Katie – backing vocals
- Beverly – backing vocals

Production

- Al Stone – production, engineering
- Blue – design and art direction
- Lorenzo Agius – photography

== Charts ==
=== Weekly charts ===
Weekly chart performance for Travelling Without Moving
Chart (1996–2026)	Peak position
Australian Albums (ARIA)	6
Austrian Albums (Ö3 Austria)	9
Belgian Albums (Ultratop Flanders)	14
Belgian Albums (Ultratop Wallonia)	5
Canada Top Albums/CDs (RPM)	37
Dutch Albums (Album Top 100)	16
Finnish Albums (Suomen virallinen lista)	6
French Albums (SNEP)	2
German Albums (Offizielle Top 100)	9
Greek Albums (IFPI)	30
Hungarian Albums (MAHASZ)	1
Italian Albums (FIMI)	64
Japanese Albums (Oricon)	6
New Zealand Albums (RMNZ)	7
Norwegian Albums (VG-lista)	16
Polish Albums (ZPAV)	41
Portuguese Albums (AFP)	38
Scottish Albums (Official Charts)	3
Spanish Albums (Promusicae)	23
Swedish Albums (Sverigetopplistan)	4
Swiss Albums (Schweizer Hitparade)	3
UK Albums (Official Charts)	2
US Billboard 200	24

=== Year-end charts ===
1996 year-end chart performance for Travelling Without Moving
Chart (1996)	Position
French Albums (SNEP)	6
German Albums (Offizielle Top 100)	69
Japanese Albums (Oricon)	87
Swiss Albums (Schweizer Hitparade)	37

1997 year-end chart performance for Travelling Without Moving
Chart (1997)	Position
Australian Albums (ARIA)	47
Belgian Albums (Ultratop Wallonia)	32
Canadian Albums (Nielsen Soundscan)	68
Dutch Albums (Album Top 100)[	48
German Albums (Offizielle Top 100)	38
Japanese Albums (Oricon)[	58
US Billboard 200	84

== Certifications and sales ==
Region	Certification	Certified units/sales
Argentina (CAPIF)	Platinum	60,000^{^}
Australia (ARIA)	Platinum	70,000^{^}
Austria (IFPI Austria)	Gold	25,000^{*}
Belgium (BRMA)	Platinum	50,000^{*}
Canada (Music Canada)	3× Platinum	300,000^{^}
France (SNEP)	2× Platinum	600,000^{*}
Germany (BVMI)	Gold	250,000^{^}
Italy (FIMI)	2× Platinum	200,000^{*}
Japan (RIAJ)	3× Platinum	600,000^{^}
Netherlands (NVPI)	Platinum	100,000^{^}
Poland (ZPAV)	Gold	50,000^{*}
Spain (Promusicae)	Gold	50,000^{^}
Switzerland (IFPI Switzerland)	Platinum	50,000^{^}
United Kingdom (BPI)	4× Platinum	1,219,197
United States (RIAA)	Platinum	1,400,000
Summaries
Europe (IFPI)	3× Platinum	3,000,000^{*}
Worldwide	—N/a	8,000,000
^{*} Sales figures based on certification alone.^{^} Shipments figures based on certification alone.
