= Do U Know Where You're Coming From =

Single by M-Beat featuring Jamiroquai

from the album Travelling Without Moving
- Released: 20 May 1996
- Genre: Drum and bass
- Length: 4:59
- Label: Sony Soho Square; Renk
- Songwriters: Jay Kay; M-Beat; Toby Smith
- Producer: M-Beat

Jamiroquai singles chronology
"Stillness in Time" (1995)	"Do U Know Where You're Coming From" (1996)	"Virtual Insanity" (1996)

Music video
- "Do You Know Where You're Coming From?" on YouTube

"Do U Know Where You're Coming From" is a song by British jungle musician M-Beat featuring British acid jazz and funk band Jamiroquai. It was included as a bonus track on the third Jamiroquai album, Travelling Without Moving (1996) (spelled "Do You Know Where You're Coming From") and was released on 20 May 1996 as the album's first single, by labels Sony Soho Square and Renk. The song peaked at number 12 on the UK Singles Chart. It later appeared as a B-side to the group's following single, "Virtual Insanity".

== Track listing ==
- UK CD single
1. "Do U Know Where You're Coming From" (radio edit – original mix) – 3:41
2. "Do U Know Where You're Coming From" (radio edit – Touch of Horn mix) – 3:38
3. "Do U Know Where You're Coming From" (extended mix) – 5:00
4. "Do U Know Where You're Coming From" (Full Horns mix) – 4:55
5. "Do U Know Where You're Coming From" (Intelligent Groove mix) – 5:17
6. "Do U Know Where You're Coming From" (Dextrous remix) – 3:53

== Charts ==
Chart (1996)	Peak position
Europe (Eurochart Hot 100)	67
Europe (European Dance Radio)	17
Finland (Suomen virallinen lista)	14
Scotland Singles (Official Charts)	35
Sweden (Sverigetopplistan)	58
Switzerland (Schweizer Hitparade)	49
UK Singles (Official Charts)	12
UK Indie (Music Week)	1
