= Incredible (M-Beat song) =

1994 single by M-Beat featuring General Levy

Single by M-Beat featuring General Levy

from the album Knowledge
- Released: June 1994 / 29 August 1994 (re-issue)
- Genre: Jungle; ragga; breakbeat
- Length: 4:56 (original mix); 4:28 (album mix); 4:12 (radio edit)
- Label: Renk
- Songwriter: General Levy
- Producer: M-Beat

M-Beat singles chronology
"Style" (1994)	"Incredible" (1994)	"Sweet Love" (1994)

Music video
- "Incredible" on YouTube

"Incredible" is a song by British jungle producer M-Beat featuring General Levy on vocals. It was first released as a single in 1994, by Renk Records, and reached number 39 on the UK Singles Chart. A re-release a few months later featuring new mixes was much more successful, peaking at number eight, and remaining on the chart for 12 weeks. "Incredible" was the first jungle track to reach the top 10 in the UK.

General Levy's vocals on "Incredible" were adapted from a song he had previously written, titled "The Wickedest General". "Incredible" uses lyrics from Levy's song "Mad Them" as well as the beat from M-Beat's song "Style". In response to General Levy's remark, following the runaway success of "Incredible", that he was "runnin' jungle", an ad hoc "Committee" of DJs and others influential in the jungle community launched a campaign against the song.

The song was featured in the 2002 British comedy film Ali G Indahouse and appears on the film's soundtrack.

== Critical reception ==
Upon the release, Andy Beevers from Music Week gave the single a score of four out of five, noting that "this combination of hardcore jungle beats and rapid-fire toasting from UK reggae star General Levy has been generating a huge buzz and could well crossover." Maria Jimenez from Music & Media remarked that "jungle is the energy supplier" to "Incredible". Ben Willmott from NME said, "Poppy and infectious, it's totally uncompromising on the new style jungle beats but has a breathtaking ragga rap from veteran General Levy. A huge hit too". Another NME editor, Dele Fadele, wrote, "This is the first proper sign of an underground music – which rules pirate radio in London – going overground. Speed is of the essence as a sampled breakbeat gets sped-up and superimposed over a start/stop ragga rhythm".

Paul Ablett from the Record Mirror Dance Update stated, "From dub plate to a rumoured London Records release, this live voiced cut will undoubtedly go all the way, proving that jungle can be voiced with some confidence by ragga DJs without them tripping over themselves while chasing the breakneck riddim." James Hamilton wrote in his weekly RM dance column, "Eagerly awaited 'jungle' breakthrough smash in frantically ragga rapped 165.5bpm original mix and more, the week's hottest hit, actually reviewed over the 'phone as not sent to me in time!"

== Legacy ==
"Incredible" received a nomination for Tune of the Year at the 1994 International Dance Awards in London.

== Track listing ==
- UK 12" (first release)

A1. "Incredible" (original mix)
B1. "Incredible" (Booyaka mix)
B2. "Incredible" (instrumental)

- UK 12" (re-release)

A1. "Incredible" (original mix)
A2. "Incredible" (Rhino mix)
B1. "Incredible" (underground mix – drum & bass)
B2. "Incredible" (underground mix – deep bass)

- UK CD single
1. "Incredible" (original mix) – 4:56
2. "Incredible" (Jungle Steppers mix) – 5:02
3. "Incredible" (underground mix – deep bass) – 4:54
4. "Style" (Sweet Girl mix) – 4:23

== Charts ==
=== Weekly charts ===
Chart (1994)	Peak position
Europe (European Dance Radio)	4
Netherlands (Single Top 100)	13
UK Singles (OCC)	39
UK Singles (OCC) (reissue)	8
UK Dance (OCC)	2
UK Indie (Music Week)	1

=== Year-end charts ===
Chart (1994)	Position
UK Singles (OCC)	68

== Certifications ==
Region	Certification	Certified units/sales
United Kingdom (BPI)	Gold	400,000^{‡}
^{‡} Sales+streaming figures based on certification alone.
