= Cosmic Girl (song) =

1996 single by Jamiroquai

Single by Jamiroquai

from the album Travelling Without Moving
- B-side: "Slipin 'N' Slidin"; "Didjital Vibrations"
- Released: 25 November 1996
- Genre: Space disco
- Length: 4:03 (album version); 3:45 (radio edit)
- Label: Sony Soho Square
- Songwriters: Jay Kay; Derrick McKenzie
- Producers: Jay Kay; Al Stone

Jamiroquai singles chronology
"Virtual Insanity" (1996)	"Cosmic Girl" (1996)	"Alright" (1997)

Audio sample
- file; help

Music video
- "Cosmic Girl" on YouTube

"Cosmic Girl" is the second single from British funk and acid jazz band Jamiroquai's third studio album, Travelling Without Moving (1996). The song was released in the United Kingdom on 25 November 1996 via Sony Soho Square. It was written by Jay Kay and Derrick McKenzie and produced by Kay and Al Stone.

The song charted in several countries, peaking at No. 6 on the UK Singles Chart and reaching No. 3 in Italy, No. 4 in Iceland, and No. 10 in Finland. In the United States, it peaked at No. 7 on the Billboard Dance Club Play chart. The accompanying music video was directed by Adrian Moat and filmed in Spain. The B-side to the single is an instrumental, "Slipin' 'N' Slidin'", a song originating from another Jamiroquai track called "Mr Boogie", which was a live-only song. "Slipin 'N' Slidin'", like "Mr Boogie", also has a vocal version.

== Composition ==
"Cosmic Girl" is a disco song, based on rhythmic "looped beats" "to give it an off-centre, otherworldly" sound. The syncopated rhythm contains 10 pulses which occur inside a 32-beat pattern, with pulses on beats 4, 7, 10, 13, 16, 19, 22, 25, 27, and 30. Coincidentally, the first four beats of this pattern are the same as the George Gershwin song "I Got Rhythm". Jamiroquai's psychedelic lyric evokes a spacey environment, using terms such as "zero gravity", "hyperspace", "galaxy" and "quasar". A disco-era aura is achieved by incorporating early electronic synthesizers along with disco-style string parts also produced by synthesizers.

== Performance ==
The song has become one of the better-known tracks of the band, and a concert staple. Live versions usually last for 7–8 minutes, nearly double the duration of the album version. In 2006, it was reissued as part of the "Classic Club Mixes" series, which also included "Space Cowboy", "Deeper Underground", "Love Foolosophy" and "Alright". In 2019, it was remixed by French DJ Dimitri From Paris.

In the United Kingdom alone, the song has sold 250,580 copies as of March 2017, and is also their second-most-streamed track, with more than 110 million plays on Spotify and a further 75 million views on YouTube.

== Critical reception ==
Justin Chadwick from Albumism wrote, "Replete with synth and string-blessed rhythms, the propulsive, disco-tinged "Cosmic Girl" finds Jay Kay serenading an irresistible, otherworldly woman akin to 'some baby Barbarella'." J.D. Considine from The Baltimore Sun called it "delightfully loopy". Larry Flick from Billboard magazine described the song as "dreamy" and "more radio-friendly". He noted that here, Jamiroquai "craftily combines classic soul nuggets with the disco-soaked house music that has everyone gleefully twirling these days. The album version sparks with live instrumentation that breathes considerable depth into the chorus, while David Morales' remix has a more glossy tone that will sound awesome on a crowded club floor." Caroline Sullivan from The Guardian stated that "Cosmic Girl", "which employs buoyant Earth, Wind and Fire-style harmonies, is fine". Everett True from Melody Maker said, "Stale jazz-funk. Acid Jazz devotees wil probably love it."

Daisy & Havoc from Music Week's RM Dance Update praised the track, giving it a full score of five out of five. They wrote, "Sends me into hyperspace when I see her pretty face... – and it's not just the lyrics that are harping back to some of disco's more amusing space-age phases on this Jamiroquai single. The band's own mixes are totally groovy – combining some very funky sounds with some top disco strings and swirls and dusted lightly with the aforementioned silly but excellent vocals. With Morales mixes and the single mix still to come, this far north 'Cosmic Girl' is already a massive hit and bound to get bigger and bigger." Ted Kessler from NME named it a "bittersweet" gem, noting the singer's "fairy-lit disco". A reviewer from People Magazine declared it as a "mind-tripping rump-shaker", that "wrap up in all of four minutes and actually leave you wanting more."

== Music video ==
Screenshot from the video

The music video for the song was directed by Adrian Moat and was filmed at the Cabo de Gata, Spain. It depicts three famous supercars driving and racing each other through several highways and mountain roads across a desert landscape from clear daylight to dawn. The cars on the video are a black Ferrari F355 GTS, a purple Lamborghini Diablo SE30 and a red Ferrari F40. Jay Kay appears to be driving the purple Lamborghini with Stuart Zender on the co-pilot seat, but the driver of the black Ferrari is not shown in detail. It has four different edits: Versions 1–3, and the so-called 'Jay's cut' version.

In a Top Gear interview, Jay Kay said that, before filming, one car had been totalled during transportation, and the windscreen of the second was smashed after one of the so-called precision drivers knocked the camera off the cliff.

Jay stated, "They made three of those special-edition 30th-anniversary Diablos, and one was a Jota, so it was a car with 600 brake horsepower that was not really road legal, so there were only two. So I had mine in storage, and the guy goes to stick it on the car transporter, and then I got word that he'd just totalled this car. There it is! [Points to picture on screen.] And we kind of had to have a purple one, because it was the purple—the cosmic—you know, it's just one of those things. So we got the other one, and I said: 'Look, wait until I get there. I'm flying in. Just nobody drive it until I get there, please. We can't afford to smash it.' So I came off the plane, and everybody looked really downtrodden, looking at the floor, and I went, 'Why are you looking so sad?', and they said, 'One of the precision drivers has knocked the camera off the cliff and taken out the front windscreen, so there's no windscreen. Lamborghini can't send one for another day or so.' So for most of the video, it had to be done with no windscreen; that's why you see me squinting, and actually trying to sing the song as well, while driving the mountain road". The F40 was provided by the Pink Floyd drummer Nick Mason, who drove in the video as well.

To celebrate 25 years since the release of Travelling Without Moving, the music video was remastered in HD for YouTube in 2021.

== Track listings ==
- UK CD1
1. "Cosmic Girl" (radio edit) – 3:45
2. "Slipin' 'N' Slidin'" – 3:36
3. "Didjital Vibrations" – 5:47
4. "Cosmic Girl" (classic radio mix) – 4:02
- UK CD2
1. "Cosmic Girl" – 4:03
2. "Cosmic Girl" (Quasar mix) – 7:41
3. "Cosmic Girl" (classic mix) – 9:22
4. "Cosmic Girl" (Cosmic dub) – 6:47
- UK cassette single
1. "Cosmic Girl" – 4:03
2. "Slipin' 'N' Slidin'" – 3:36
- European CD single
1. "Cosmic Girl" (radio edit) – 3:45
2. "Slipin' 'N' Slidin'" – 3:36
- Australian CD and cassette single
1. "Cosmic Girl" (radio edit) – 3:45
2. "Cosmic Girl" (classic radio mix) – 4:02
3. "Cosmic Girl" (Quasar mix) – 7:41
4. "Cosmic Girl" (classic mix) – 9:22
- US maxi-CD single
1. "Cosmic Girl" (album version) – 4:03
2. "Cosmic Girl" (classic mix) – 9:22
3. "Cosmic Girl" (Quasar mix) – 7:40
4. "Cosmic Girl" (Cosmic dub) – 6:48
5. "Cosmic Girl" (Quasar dub) – 7:17
- US 12-inch single

A1. "Cosmic Girl" (classic mix) – 9:22
A2. "Cosmic Girl" (Quasar mix) – 7:40
B1. "Cosmic Girl" (Cosmic dub) – 6:48
B2. "Cosmic Girl" (Quasar dub) – 7:17
B3. "Cosmic Girl" (album version) – 4:03

- Japanese CD single
1. "Cosmic Girl" (radio edit)
2. "Slipin' 'N' Slidin'"
3. "Cosmic Girl" (classic radio mix)
4. "Cosmic Girl" (classic mix)
5. "Cosmic Girl" (Quasar mix)

== Charts ==
=== Weekly charts ===
Weekly chart performance for "Cosmic Girl"
Chart (1996–1997)	Peak position
Australia (ARIA)	33
Belgium (Ultratip Bubbling Under Flanders)	2
Belgium (Ultratop 50 Wallonia)	34
Czech Republic (IFPI CR)	10
Europe (Eurochart Hot 100)	11
Europe (European Dance Radio)	5
Finland (Suomen virallinen lista)	10
France (SNEP)	23
France Airplay (SNEP)	1
Hungary (Mahasz)	6
Iceland (Íslenski Listinn Topp 40)	4
Ireland (IRMA)	12
Israel (Israeli Singles Chart)	18
Italy (Musica e dischi)	3
Italy Airplay (Music & Media)	1
Netherlands (Single Top 100)	78
New Zealand (Recorded Music NZ)	29
Poland Airplay (Music & Media)	1
Scottish Singles Sales (Official Charts)	9
Spain (AFYVE)	3
Spain Airplay (Music & Media)	2
Sweden (Sverigetopplistan)	45
UK Singles (Official Charts)	6
UK Airplay (Music Week)	2
UK Club Chart (Music Week)	1
UK Pop Tip Club Chart (Music Week)	6
US Dance Club Songs (Billboard)	7
US Dance Singles Sales (Billboard)	18

=== Year-end charts ===
1996 Year-end chart performance for "Cosmic Girl"
Chart (1996)	Position
UK Singles (OCC)	99
UK Club Chart (Music Week)	7
UK Pop Tip Club Chart (Music Week)	44

1997 Year-end chart performance for "Cosmic Girl"
Chart (1997)	Position
Italy (Musica e dischi)	69

== Certifications ==
Certifications for "Cosmic Girl"
Region	Certification	Certified units/sales
Mexico (AMPROFON)	Platinum	60,000^{‡}
New Zealand (RMNZ)	Gold	15,000^{‡}
United Kingdom (BPI)	Platinum	600,000^{‡}
^{‡} Sales+streaming figures based on certification alone.

== Release history ==
Release dates and formats for "Cosmic Girl"
Region	Date	Format(s)	Label(s)	Ref.
United Kingdom	25 November 1996	CD; cassette	Sony Soho Square	
Japan	4 December 1996	CD	Epic	
United States	14 January 1997	Rhythmic contemporary radio	Work	
