= Heartless Crew =

British UK Garage crew

- Origin: London, England
- Genres: UK garage, grime, R&B, dancehall, hip hop, jungle
- Years active: 1992–2010, 2016–present
- Labels: East West Records, Bush Bash Records
- Members: MC Bushkin; MC Mighty Moe; DJ Fonti
- Website: heartlesscrew.com

The Heartless Crew are a UK garage crew from North London. The group has been credited for paving the way for grime music, alongside So Solid Crew and Pay As U Go.

Its original members are MCs Bushkin and Mighty Moe and DJ Fonti.

== Career ==
Bushkin and Fonti are of West Indian heritage, whilst Mighty Moe's mother is Palestinian and his father is from Iraq.

The group were established in 1992 when Bushkin and Fonti met at North London's Holloway Boys School. Fonti would meet up with Mighty Moe at college. Originally, the crew had more members. The crew has stated their inspirations include Rory from Stonelove, Shabba Ranks, KRS-One, Stevie Hyper D, Inspector Longman and New Dimensions sound system, Sky Juice - Metro Media, Buju Banton, R. Kelly, DJ Brockie and MC Det. They started off playing at house parties and small clubs, moving through to a residency at Chimes nightclub in Hackney in 1996. Their first performance at Chimes nightclub was in 1994. Prior to becoming a UK garage crew, the collective ran a mobile sound system, where they would play various genres such as hip hop, R&B and ragga, before eventually specialising in UK garage due to their popularity in the genre.

By 1998, they had joined the pirate radio station Mission 90.6 FM, pioneering a mix of R&B, hip-hop, jungle and dancehall derived sounds, taking its cues straight from the Jamaican sound system tradition, while adding fresh and modern elements from UK garage. They also featured on London pirates Freek FM 101.8 and Y2K FM 90.6. In 2001, Heartless Crew had a notable clash with fellow UKG crew Pay As U Go.

In 2002, they signed to BBC Radio 1Xtra, where they presented their Sunday evening programme. They also released a debut compilation album, Heartless Crew presents Crisp Biscuit Vol 1 on the East West record label, closely followed by their debut single, "The Heartless Theme a.k.a 'The Superglue Riddim'". The single reached number 21 on the UK Singles Chart in May 2002. The music video for "The Heartless Theme" was directed by Andy Hylton. The crew were nominated at the MOBO Awards in 2002. They left 1Xtra in 2006.

It was announced in 2010 that the Heartless Crew split up, to pursue solo careers whilst still remaining friends. MC Bushkin and DJ Fonti went on to present the F.A.B. (Fonti & Bushkin) show together on Rinse FM on Friday evenings between 7-9pm, however they left the station in late 2012/early 2013, with Bushkin pursuing a career as a recording artist. MC Bushkin announced he was quitting MCing in 2014.

In 2016, the trio returned as a group, headlining the sold out Garage Nation Festival to critical acclaim online. They have since appeared at Notting Hill Carnival, headlined the o2 Academy in Leicester and performed as special guests at Eskimo Dance in Bristol. They were also set to appear at Birmingham's notorious club night 0231 at Rainbow Venues and alongside Kurupt FM at a sold out Brixton Academy show before the end of the year. In 2017, they continued performing at in demand events, appearing at the Snowbombing festival in Austria and at Annie Mac's Lost & Found Festival in Malta.

== Discography ==
=== Albums ===
- Heartless Crew presents Crisp Biscuit Vol 1 (May 2002) - #10 UK Compilation Album Chart

=== Singles ===
Year	Single	Peak chart positions	Album
Year	Single	UK	Album
2002	"The Heartless Theme"	21	Heartless Crew presents Crisp Biscuit Vol 1
2003	"Why (Looking Back)"	50	Singles only
2003	"Hearts in the Music"	—	Singles only
"—" denotes single that did not chart or was not released.
