= Virtual Insanity =

1996 single by Jamiroquai

Single by Jamiroquai

from the album Travelling Without Moving
- B-side: "Do You Know Where You're Coming From"; "Bullet"
- Released: 19 August 1996
- Genre: Acid jazz; trip hop; alternative rock; funk rock
- Length: 5:40 (album version); 4:04 (single version); 3:46 (radio edit)
- Label: Sony Soho Square
- Songwriters: Jay Kay; Toby Smith
- Producer: Al Stone

Jamiroquai singles chronology
"Do U Know Where You're Coming From" (1996)	"Virtual Insanity" (1996)	"Cosmic Girl" (1996)

Audio sample
- file; help

Music video
- "Virtual Insanity" on YouTube

"Virtual Insanity" is a song by English funk and acid jazz band Jamiroquai, released on 19 August 1996 by Sony Soho Square as the second single from their third studio album, Travelling Without Moving (1996). The song was written by Jay Kay and Toby Smith, and produced by Al Stone. Its music video, directed by Jonathan Glazer, was released in September 1996, garnering 10 nominations and winning four, including for Video of the Year, at the 1997 MTV Video Music Awards. The music video has since become an Internet meme.

"Virtual Insanity" was a number-one hit in Iceland and reached number three on the UK Singles Chart. As well as becoming a top-10 hit in Finland, Ireland, and Italy, the song also climbed to number 38 on the US Billboard Modern Rock Tracks chart and became one of their biggest US hits. The song also earned the band a Grammy Award for Best Pop Vocal Performance by a Duo or Group.

== Composition ==
The song's lyrics took inspiration from a walk in an underground city in Sapporo, Japan, by singer Jay Kay and the band's didgeridoo player, Wallis Buchanan, with Kay writing: Vocalist Jay Kay was inspired by a visit to Sapporo, Japan, and spoke about how "everything was covered in snow and there was absolutely no one about. The song's title is a play off virtual reality.

Initially recorded as a rough demo, it was only after the label requested a single for Travelling Without Moving that the song was fully realised and was the last track to be properly recorded. The song has a piano opening with "buoyant keyboards and soaring strings." The riff continues throughout the song.

Thematically, the lyrics are concerned with issues like overpopulation, human genetic enhancement, artificial intelligence uprising, eugenics, and ecological collapse.

The first B-side of the single is the song "Do U Know Where You're Coming From", in collaboration with M-Beat. It was released as a single earlier in 1996. The second B-side of the single is "Bullet".

In the beginning of the song's album version, a sound that is sampled from the 1979 sci-fi horror film Alien appears. It is the sound sequence when the S.O.S. signal appears on the screens of the spaceship Nostromo at the start of the film. The album version is longer, including the addition of extra vocals and a bridge.

== Critical reception ==
The song received favorable reviews from music critics. Scottish Aberdeen Press and Journal viewed it as "cool if lyrically trite". Justin Chadwick from Albumism said that the "midtempo, piano-driven groove" finds the singer "lamenting the proliferation of technology at the expense of human connection and preservation of our planet", as best evidenced in the chorus with lines such as, "Always, seem to, be governed by this love we have / For useless, twisting, of our new technology / Oh, now there is no sound—for we all live underground". He added, "While the song itself reflected Jamiroquai's more mature and polished sound at the time, it was the accompanying video unveiled the following month that became the band's transformative, watershed moment."

Larry Flick from Billboard magazine described it as "wriggling" and "funk-fortified". In 2023, the magazine ranked "Virtual Insanity" number 68 in their list of "The 100 Best Pop Songs Never to Hit the Hot 100", writing, "An infectiously groovy bit of future-fearing Stevie Wonder pastiche from a British funk band — with one of the all-time great music videos, featuring singer Jay Kay getting down with his bad self on a magically-moving dancefloor while wearing a somewhat ridiculous, now-iconic furry hat." A reviewer from Liverpool Echo noted, "If you stop dancing, and listen to the lyrics, you see a whole new side to singer Jay Kay." Music Week gave it a score of four out of five, adding, "From its simple piano opening onwards, this gorgeous, immaculately-recorded track doesn't put a note wrong. Further evidence that Jay Kay is maturing musically." Ted Kessler from NME named it a "bittersweet" gem and a "fine" single. Sam Taylor from The Observer remarked its "effortless swank". Aidin Viziri from Salon felt the singer "keeps the party alive with unbridled enthusiasm", "exploring the chaos of modern life".

== Music video ==
A screenshot from the beginning of the music video for "Virtual Insanity", with singer Jay Kay balancing still as he appears to be propelled towards the camera

The music video for "Virtual Insanity" was directed by English filmmaker Jonathan Glazer. It was filmed on 12 August 1996 at Academy Films studio in London. Glazer was specifically chosen to direct the video due to his work on Radiohead's music video for "Street Spirit (Fade Out)". At the 1997 MTV Video Music Awards in September 1997, it earned ten nominations and won four awards: Breakthrough Video, Best Special Effects, Best Cinematography, and the highly coveted Video of the Year. In 2006, it was voted ninth by MTV viewers in a poll on music videos that "broke the rules". At the 1997 MTV Video Music Awards, Jamiroquai performed the song on travelators (which Kay had originally intended for the music video), recreating the famous floor-moving concept with two moving walkways on the stage floor that went in opposite directions. Kay danced on the walkways, with the two bugs crawling through the hall, a bird flying, and red blood all over the floor.

The music video consists mainly of Jamiroquai's singer, Jay Kay, dancing and singing the song in a bright white room with a grey floor. Throughout the video, there are several combinations of plastic-wrapped leather couches and chairs seemingly moving around the room on their own accord, which are the only pieces of furniture in the room, and Kay is seen using a sequence of elaborate dance manoeuvres to avoid being hit by them. The video earned recognition from critics for its special effects, ultimately winning an MTV Video Music Award for Best Visual Effects. The floor appears to move while the rest of the room stays still; in fact, this was the original idea but was later determined by one of Glazer's team that it would cost about £280,000 (equivalent to £562,026 in 2025; ~US$810,000 in 2024 terms) for the rig alone; the final cost for the entire video was about £150,000 (equivalent to £301,085 in 2025; ~US$452,000 in 2024 terms). Instead, it is the walls that move, an idea from one of Jonathan Glazer's crew which was initially seen as comically ridiculous by most of Glazer's team but was immediately recognised as brilliant by Glazer, who called Kay at about 1am to inform him of the idea. Kay, possibly half asleep, did not understand the idea until he arrived at the set and understood Glazer's intention and saw the rig in action.

"No computer trickery was used," Glazer said. "What we did was put the whole set on wheels and attach the camera to one wall. The furniture also had little wheels, and we had guys moving the set and the furniture [outside of the frame]. The floor never moved. It was like a magician's trick."

At some points, the camera tilts up or down to show the floor or ceiling for a few seconds, and when it returns to the central position, the scene has completely changed; this was done to mask the cuts and make it look like a continuous take (when in fact there were a total of four takes). Other scenes show a crow flying across the room, a cockroach on the floor, the couches bleeding, and the other members of Jamiroquai in a corridor being blown away by wind.

In a short making-of documentary, Glazer describes how the walls move on a stationary grey floor with no detail, which give the illusion that objects on the floor are moving. In several shots, chairs or couches are fixed to the walls so that they appear to be standing still when in fact they are moving. In other shots, the furniture remain stationary on the floor, but the illusion is such that they appear to be moving. Parts of the floor had tape markings as a reference point for Kay, which had to be digitally deleted in post-production, but Kay said he had to improvise parts such as where he does a blind 180-degree spin on his knees to avoid hitting a wall or when he tiptoes past an incoming couch that was about to pin him against the wall; in both cases, it was only upon playing the footage back that he realised how finely he had avoided danger.

In September 2021, a remaster of the video in 4K was premiered on YouTube to promote a new vinyl release of Travelling Without Moving.

=== Popularity ===
In 2011, the "Virtual Insanity" video was listed on The 30 All-Time Best Music Videos by Time magazine and was also listed in Forbes 25 Greatest Music Videos of All Time. Music Week included the video in its "25 Videos That Changed The World" list in 2006.

=== In popular culture ===
The music video for "Virtual Insanity" has been parodied, referred to, remixed, or imitated in countless music videos, television shows, and internet memes. A TV promo by comedian Chris Rock was made for the 1997 MTV Video Music Awards, whereby Rock imitates Jay Kay in a comedic fashion through digital superimposition. In 2007, the video's original director, Jonathan Glazer, uploaded a parody of the video whereby the room was digitally turned into a bathroom and had Jay Kay appear to interact with patrons in a comedic fashion, again using digital superimposition.

Austin Mahone and Pitbull took inspiration from it in the video for their 2014 single "Mmm Yeah", and it is one of the many songs parodied in the video for FIDLAR's 2015 single "40oz. on Repeat". Other notable parodies include a cutaway from the season 14 Family Guy episode "Scammed Yankees", which went viral as an internet meme in 2023 under the portmanteau "Cartermiroquai". It was also referenced in the season 11 Robot Chicken episode "May Cause the Exact Thing You're Taking This to Avoid". The music video also inspired a video game entitled Jamiroquai Game, wherein the player must avoid the various objects in the scene, akin to the video.

Junya Watanabe of Comme des Garçons presented a men's fall/winter 2022 mini fashion show in tribute to Jamiroquai's "Virtual Insanity" music video.

In July 2026, gin brand Beefeater launched a global advertising campaign titled "Get More With 0.0" to promote its alcohol-free Beefeater 0.0% expression, partnering with Jamiroquai to coincide with the 30th anniversary of the "Virtual Insanity" music video. Created by agency Lucky Generals and directed by Julien & Quentin, the commercial recreated the original video's shifting-floor concept using practical in-camera effects rather than computer-generated imagery. It also included treadmills in a possible reference to the music video for the OK Go song "Here It Goes Again". The advertisement humorously reveals that Jay Kay's iconic reaching gesture toward the camera in the original 1996 video was actually him reaching for a bottle of Beefeater 0.0%.

=== Accolades ===
Year	Organization	Award	Result
1997	MTV Video Music Award	Video of the Year	Won
1997	MTV Video Music Award	Best New Artist	Nominated
1997	MTV Video Music Award	Breakthrough Video	Won
1997	MTV Video Music Award	Best Direction (Directors: Jonathan Glazer)	Nominated
1997	MTV Video Music Award	Best Choreography (Choreographers: Jason Kay)	Nominated
1997	MTV Video Music Award	Best Visual Effects (Visual Effects: Jonathan Glazer and Sean Broughton)	Won
1997	MTV Video Music Award	Best Art Direction (Art Director: John Bramble)	Nominated
1997	MTV Video Music Award	Best Editing (Editor: Jonathan Glazer and John McManus)	Nominated
1997	MTV Video Music Award	Best Cinematography (Cinematographer: Stephen Keith-Roach)	Won
1997	MTV Video Music Award	International Viewer's Choice Award for MTV Europe	Nominated

== Track listings ==
- UK CD1 and Australian CD single
1. "Virtual Insanity" – 4:04
2. "Do You Know Where You're Coming From" (original mix) – 4:59
3. "Bullet" – 4:19
4. "Virtual Insanity" (album version) – 5:40
- UK CD2
1. "Virtual Insanity" – 4:04
2. "Space Cowboy" (classic radio) – 4:01
3. "Emergency on Planet Earth" (London Rican Mix) – 7:10
4. "Do You Know Where You're Coming From" – 4:59
- UK cassette single
1. "Virtual Insanity" – 4:04
2. "Virtual Insanity" (album version) – 5:40
3. "Virtual Insanity" (Unreality Mix) – 3:54
- European CD single
1. "Virtual Insanity" – 4:04
2. "Do You Know Where You're Coming From" (original mix) – 4:59

== Charts ==
=== Weekly charts ===
Chart (1996–1997)	Peak position
Australia (ARIA)	75
Belgium (Ultratip Bubbling Under Flanders)	15
Belgium (Ultratop 50 Wallonia)	15
Canada Top Singles (RPM)	64
Europe (Eurochart Hot 100)	8
Europe (European Dance Radio)	1
Finland (Suomen virallinen lista)	7
France (SNEP)	16
Germany (GfK)	63
Iceland (Íslenski Listinn Topp 40)	1
Ireland (IRMA)	7
Israel (Israeli Singles Chart)	11
Italy (Musica e dischi)	5
Italy Airplay (Music & Media)	2
Netherlands (Dutch Top 40 Tipparade)	9
Netherlands (Single Top 100 Tipparade)	7
Scottish Singles Sales (Official Charts)	4
Sweden (Sverigetopplistan)	32
Switzerland (Schweizer Hitparade)	19
UK Singles (Official Charts)	3
UK Hip Hop/R&B (Official Charts)	1
UK Airplay (Music Week)	1
US Adult Pop Airplay (Billboard)	37
US Alternative Airplay (Billboard)	38
US Dance Club Songs (Billboard)	34
US Pop Airplay (Billboard)	39

Chart (2012)	Peak position
Japan Hot 100 (Billboard)	91

=== Year-end charts ===
Chart (1996)	Position
Belgium (Ultratop 50 Wallonia)	81
Europe (Eurochart Hot 100)	84
France (SNEP)	70
Iceland (Íslenski Listinn Topp 40)	5
Israel (Israeli Singles Chart)	35
UK Singles (OCC)	39
UK Airplay (Music Week)	19

== Certifications ==
Region	Certification	Certified units/sales
Italy (FIMI)	Gold	25,000^{‡}
Japan (RIAJ) Full-length ringtone	Gold	100,000^{*}
Mexico (AMPROFON)	2× Platinum	120,000^{‡}
New Zealand (RMNZ)	Platinum	30,000^{‡}
Spain (Promusicae)	Gold	30,000^{‡}
United Kingdom (BPI)	Platinum	600,000^{‡}
^{*} Sales figures based on certification alone.^{‡} Sales+streaming figures based on certification alone.

== Release history ==
Region	Date	Format(s)	Label(s)	Ref.
United Kingdom	19 August 1996	CD; cassette	Sony Soho Square	
Japan	11 September 1996	CD	Epic	
United States	20 May 1997	Rhythmic contemporary; contemporary hit radio	Work	
Various	19 June 2026	12-inch vinyl	Sony Music	
