= General Levy =

British recording artist

- Born: Paul Scott Levy; 28 April 1971 (age 55); Park Royal, London, England
- Genres: Ragga; jungle; reggae
- Occupation: Musician
- Instrument: Vocals
- Years active: 1988–present

Paul Scott Levy (born 28 April 1971), also known as General Levy, is an English ragga deejay, regularly employed on studio tracks by drum and bass DJs. He is best known for the track "Incredible" which he recorded with M-Beat. A remixed version of this reached number eight on the UK singles chart in 1994.

== Biography ==
General Levy was born in Central Middlesex Hospital in Park Royal, London on 28 April 1971. He is of Trinidadian descent. Levy's formative years were spent in Harlesden and Wembley in the London Borough of Brent in northwest London. Levy's musical influence was developed in the area, collecting dancehall tapes, beginning in 1981. At the age of 12, General Levy began writing lyrics and went on to form his first sound system with friends, two years later, named Third Dimension.

General Levy's first major releases were with the independent record label Fashion Records, who signed a distribution deal with London Records for the re-releases of the tracks he had recorded. He had earlier releases with the record producers Lloydy Crucial and Robbo Ranx (later of BBC 1xtra), but these were mainly tracks that were hits on the underground dancehall scene. General Levy was ostracized by the UK jungle scene in 1994, due to mis-reported comments he made relating to his collaboration with M-Beat on "Incredible". He had claimed in an interview with The Face that "I run jungle at the moment". This controversy has since died down and he is now being cited as one of the 25 UK MCs "who changed the game".

"Incredible" was featured in the film Ali G Indahouse, and as a TV advertising campaign by Honda.

General Levy briefly collaborated with Rocco Barker of Flesh for Lulu in the band The Space Police. Levy also featured on the song "Only God Can Judge Me" by R&B singer Mark Morrison.

He collaborated with Madness singer Suggs on his 1998 album The Three Pyramids Club, on the track "Girl".

Levy featured on many sound systems in the late 1980s and early 1990s, such as Java One Love, Java and Tippertone Sound.

His collaborations with dub producer Joe Ariwa appear on several releases including "In the Ghetto" and "Be Conscious & Wise: Dub Showcase".

In 2018, he collaborated with artists such as Chase & Status, Fedde Le Grand and Spragga Benz.

== Discography ==
=== Albums ===
- Double Trouble (1991, Gussie P Records) – Capleton & General Levy
- The Wickeder General (1992, Fashion Records)
- Wickedness Increase (1993, FFRR/London)
- Rumble in the Jungle Volume One (1994, Jungle Fashion Records) – Top Cat & General Levy
- New Breed (1999, Arts Records)
- Spirit & Faith (2008, BoombamMuzik)
- We Progressive (feat The PSB Family) (2011, X-Ray Records)
- In the Chamber of Dub (2012, Ariwa Sounds) – Joe Ariwa & General Levy
- 4ward (2014) – DJ Bonnot & General Levy
- Be Conscious and Wise – General Levy & Joe Ariwa

=== Singles ===
Year	Song	UK	Certifications
1992	"Heat"	—	
1992	"Champagne Body"	—	
1992	"Sceeming"	—	
1993	"Mr. Push It Good"	—	
1993	"Monkey Man" (with Junior Dan)	75	
1994	"Ready for the World"	—	
1994	"Weh Dem a Watch We For" (with Cutty Ranks)	—	
1994	"Incredible" (with M-Beat)	39	
1994	"Incredible" (remix) (with M-Beat)	8	BPI: Gold
2004	"Shake (What Ya Mama Gave Ya)" (General Levy vs Zeus featuring Bally Jagpal)	51	
2007	"Bring It On" (Dancehall Party Riddim) (with Ragga Meridional Crew)	—	
2012	"Blaze the Fire" (with Danny Byrd)	—	
2014	"Pull Up" (with Sticky)	—	
2017	"Move" (featuring Toni Toolz)	—	
2018	"Flex" (with Fedde Le Grand & Funk Machine)	—	
2018	"Are You Ready" (with Spragga Benz)	—	
2018	"Heater" (with Chase & Status)	—	
2020	"Good Love" (with Reggae Roast)	—	
2023	"We Run the Area" (with Idris Elba, Toddla T & Naomi Cowan)	—	
2024	"Good Mourning" (with Shaznay Lewis & Shola Ama)	—	
2024	"Old Days" (with Leanne Louise & DJ Illatek)	—	
"—" denotes releases that did not chart.

== Book ==
On 13 November 2022 Levy self published his autobiography entitled Incredible exploring his life and career to date.
