= Roy Davis Jr. =

American electronic musician (born 1970)

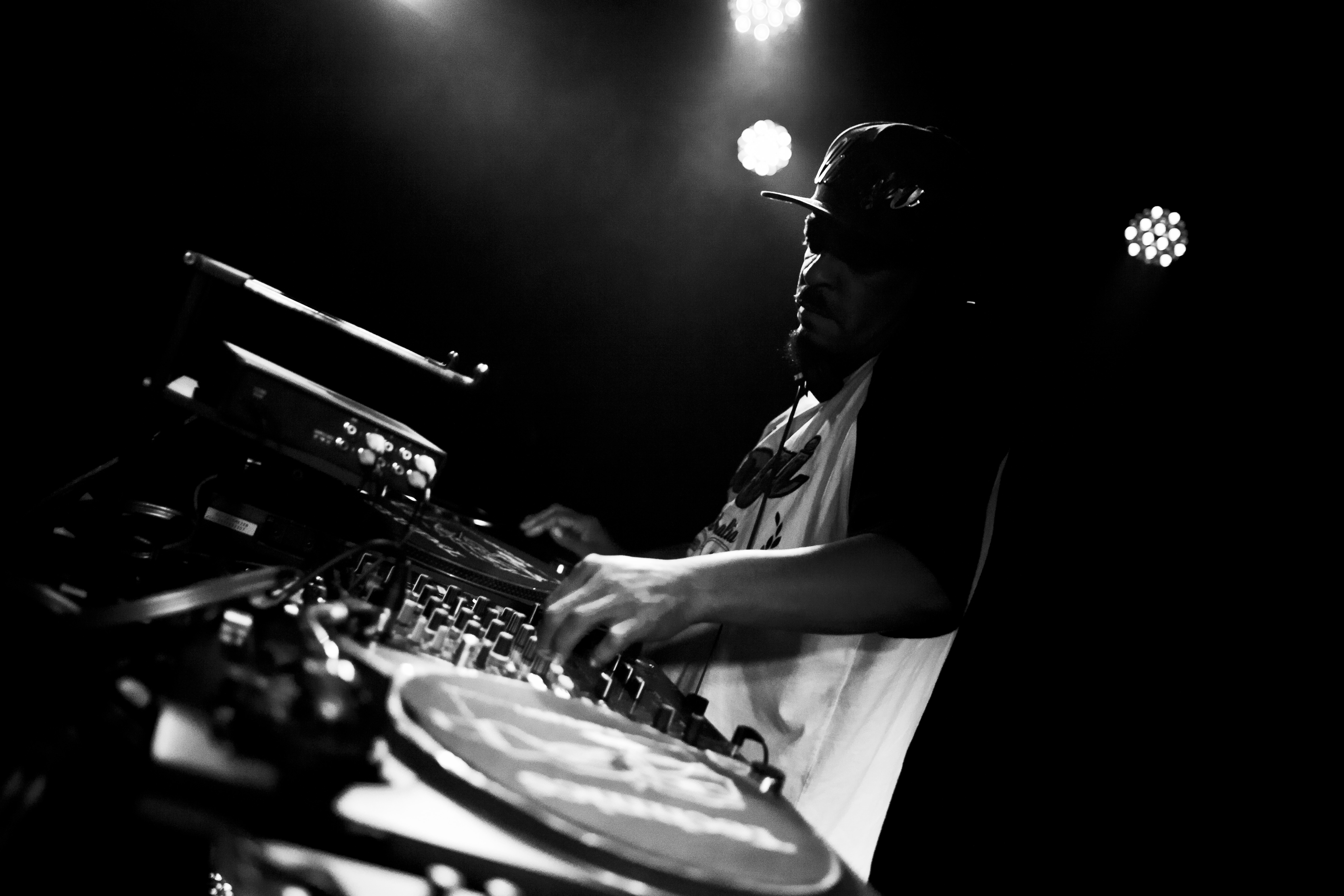
- Roy Davis Jr. by Sean Delahay

Background information
- Born: Roy Davis Earl Jr. February 27, 1970 (age 56); Van Nuys, California, U.S.
- Genres: House, garage house
- Occupations: Musician, DJ, remixer
- Years active: 1986–present
- Labels: XL Recordings, Defected Records, Strictly Rhythm, Undaground Therapy Muzik, Peacefrog
- Website: https://www.facebook.com/roydavisjrofficial

Roy Davis Jr. (born February 27, 1970) is an American electronic musician from Chicago, Illinois, specialising in house music.

== Biography ==
Davis was born in Van Nuys, California, and grew up in Chicago, Illinois, United States, and became interested in house music at an early age by the likes of Lil' Louis, DJ Pierre, Farley Keith (Farley Jackmaster Funk) and Marshall Jefferson. Davis began his own production company named Phuture in the late 1980s and went on to become an A&R scout for record label Strictly Rhythm in New York City, whilst also running his Chicago founded record label Undaground Therapy Muzik. A few years later, Davis and singer-songwriter Peven Everett wrote and produced the single "Gabriel" which was released on Large Records in 1996, and later licensed and released on XL Recordings in 1997. The track garnered international airplay, and was played in nightclubs around the world. It peaked at No. 22 on the UK Singles Chart in November 1997. The single sold over 200,000 copies and has appeared on numerous of compilation albums including Desert Island Mix from Gilles Peterson. In 2004, Davis' track "About Love" reached No. 70 in the UK, adding to the list of previous chart success with records such as "Who Dares to Believe in Me" under alias The Believers which was released on New York label Strictly Rhythm, and "All I Do" released on Omar-S' artist-run label FXHE.

Davis Jr. has also been known for his work for Thomas Bangalter's label Roulé which operated out of Paris in the early '90s and his production work for artists such as Eric Benet, Faith Evans, Mary J. Blige, Seal, Patti LaBelle, Christina Milian and Morcheeba. Under Roulé, Bangalter contributed a remix of Davis Jr.'s track "Rock Shock", entitled "Rock Shock (Thomas Bangalter's 'Start-Stop' Mix). Davis Jr.'s father, Roy Davis, was also mentioned on Daft Punk's track "Teachers" which was essentially a compiled list of their influences in music.

In 2011, he produced a record with J. Noize and Kaye Fox called "Enjoy the Ride".

In April 2016, Davis announced that he had been diagnosed with multiple sclerosis, and was to cancel some planned shows but planned to return to performing live and producing music as his health would allow him.

== Discography ==
=== Albums ===
- The Secret Mission
- Traxx from the Nile
- Chicago Forever
- Water for Thirsty Children
- God Life Music
- Destroy & Rebuild

==== Compilation albums ====
- Midnight Passion / Looking for Excitement
- Soul Electra

=== Singles ===
- "Rock Shock"
- "I Got the Music"
- "Galactic Disco"
- "Gabriel" (feat. Peven Everett) - UK No. 22
- "About Love" - UK No. 70
- "All I Do"
