= M-Beat =

British musician (born 1975)

- Born: Marlon Hart; 1975 (age 49–50)
- Origin: London, England
- Genres: Jungle
- Occupations: Musician; record producer
- Years active: 1990s
- Labels: Renk
- Member of: Bagatune

Marlon Hart (born 1975), known professionally as M-Beat, is a jungle musician and record producer. The nephew of Sly Dunbar, Hart scored three top 20 hit singles on the UK singles chart: "Incredible" (featuring General Levy) at number eight, "Sweet Love" (a cover of the Anita Baker song featuring Nazlyn) at number 18 (both from 1994), and "Do U Know Where You're Coming From" (featuring Jamiroquai) at number 12 in 1996. He has also produced remixes for re-releases of Soul II Soul's "Keep On Movin'" (1996) and Roy Davis Jr.'s "Gabriel" (1997), which respectively peaked at numbers 31 and 22 on the chart. In 2023, Willow Kayne cited Hart as an inspiration.

== Life and career ==
=== Early life and "Incredible" ===
Marlon Hart was born in 1975 to Jamaican parents, and is from the East End of London. His father is Junior Hart, who staged parties for a living, and set up H Jam Productions in 1988; his cousin, and Marlon's uncle, is Sly Dunbar. In February 1995, Music Week reported that Junior had "first encountered M Beat [sic] towards the end of 1989 after seeing him drum in a school group", that he responded by giving Marlon an audio workstation, that he decided to set up Renk Records in March 1990 as an outlet for Marlon's works after being impressed by them, and that both Marlon's and Renk's first release was "Let's Pop an E" that month. His works constituted jungle music, a genre noted for its self-sufficiency.

One of Hart's works sampled General Levy, a then-reggae vocalist, who then collaborated with Marlon for "Incredible"; recollections vary as to how the collaboration came about, with Levy using a March 1995 interview with Billboard to state that he contacted Marlon after hearing his voice sampled on a jungle track, and Junior using a March 2021 interview with Test Pressing to state that he contacted Levy after being played his track "Heat" by Dunbar's employer Fashion Records. Upon release, the track charted at No. 39 on the UK Singles Chart in June 1994; the track was then deleted and then re-released, upon which it charted at No. 8. Comments made by Levy to The Face after he and Marlon performed at a concert at Waltham Forest Town Hall caused a group of jungle musicians to form the "Jungle Committee", a group of DJs formed to deal with Levy's perceived insubordination; DJ Rap, who defied the ban, later told a Channel 5 documentary that she had received a month of death threats over her playlisting of the track. Hart and Levy would later work together on "Unique", which appeared on Levy's album New Breed, released in 1999.

=== Later releases ===
In September 1994, after Hart and Levy later played "Incredible" on Top of the Pops, Hart met Sinéad O'Connor, who invited him to remix her single "Fire on Babylon". Later that year, Hart released "Sweet Love", a cover of the Anita Baker song which featured Nazlyn, a London-based vocalist, and Kenny Wellington from Light of the World on trumpet, which charted at No. 18 on the UK Singles Chart. In 1996, he collaborated with Jamiroquai on their single "Do U Know Where You're Coming From", which charted at No. 12, and later that year he contributed remixes for a re-release of Soul II Soul's "Keep On Movin'", which charted at No. 31 on the UK Singles Chart. His final release on Renk was "Morning Will Come", a collaboration with Junior Giscombe; shortly after which he signed to XL Recordings, and produced a remix of Roy Davis Jr.'s "Gabriel", which appeared on XL's 1997 re-release, which charted at No. 22 on the UK Singles Chart.

Subsequent M-Beat releases and reissues were released without Hart's permission; according to a January 2022 DJ Mag article, Hart was given pocket money instead of royalties, was made homeless aged 21 "within months" of releasing "Do You Know Where You're Coming From" after being thrown out of the family home following an argument with his father, took a job as a taxi driver, and then later took up posts as an IT consultant for McLaren and Lloyds Bank, returning to making music after finding his consultancy jobs unfulfilling. In 2019, he formed Bagatune with the jungle musician Missing, as part of which he released the single "On/Off" with TeeZandos on 20 September 2024 and the mixtape Fusion Without Formula on 15 November 2024. In May 2023, in a press release for her track "Mr Universe" featuring General Levy and Toddla T, Willow Kayne cited Hart as an influence.
